= Horacio Arruda =

Canadian physician

Quebec National Director of Public Health
- In office May 9, 2012 – Jan 10, 2022
- Succeeded by: Luc Boileau

Personal details
- Born: 1960 (age 65–66) Sainte-Thérèse, Quebec, Canada
- Spouse: Nicole Mercier (m. 1985)
- Children: 3
- Education: Université de Sherbrooke
- Occupation: Physician

Horacio Arruda is a Canadian physician specialized in community health who formerly served as National Director of Public Health and Assistant Deputy Minister at the Ministry of Health and Social Services for Quebec under Premier François Legault.

== Biography ==
Born in 1960 in Sainte-Thérèse to parents from the Azores, Portugal, who immigrated to Quebec in the late 1950s, Arruda obtained his Doctor of Medicine degree from the Université de Sherbrooke in 1983. In 1988, he also obtained a certificate in community health and preventive medicine at the Université de Sherbrooke.

During his first years of practice, Arruda worked at the Public Health Department in Laval. From 1998 to 2012, he was an assistant clinical professor in the Department of Social and Preventive Medicine at the Université de Montréal. He was director of public health protection at the Quebec Ministry of Health and Social Services from 2000 to 2012. In May 2012, he was appointed National Director of Public Health. While working for this ministry, he has been involved in the management of the SARS outbreak in 2003, the H1N1 pandemic in 2009, and in public health measures during the Lac-Mégantic rail disaster in 2013.

In 2020, he became more widely known to the public during the COVID-19 pandemic in Quebec. Premier François Legault, Minister of Health Danielle McCann and Arruda took part in daily press conferences which attracted a lot of media attention. Arruda gave advice during the COVID-19 pandemic and became a subject of internet memes on social media. In early May, Justin Trudeau disapproved of his advice to re-open Quebec's elementary schools and daycares.

On January 10, 2022, Arruda resigned from his position as National Director of Public Health in Quebec and admitted to an "erosion" of public trust. On January 11, Premier François Legault named Luc Boileau Quebec's interim National Director of Public Health.

=== Personal life ===
Arruda is married to Nicole Mercier, a family physician in Blainville, Québec. They have three adult children.
