= Danielle McCann =

Canadian politician

The Honourable Danielle McCann

Member of the National Assembly of Quebec for Sanguinet
- In office October 1, 2018 – August 28, 2022
- Preceded by: Alain Therrien
- Succeeded by: Christine Fréchette

Minister of Higher Education
- In office June 22, 2020 – October 20, 2022
- Preceded by: Jean-François Roberge
- Succeeded by: Pascale Déry

Minister of Health and Social Services
- In office October 18, 2018 – June 22, 2020
- Preceded by: Gaétan Barrette
- Succeeded by: Christian Dubé

Personal details
- Party: Coalition Avenir Québec
- Cabinet: Minister of Higher Education Minister of Health and Social Services

Danielle McCann is a Canadian politician, who was elected to the National Assembly of Quebec in the 2018 provincial election. She represents the electoral district of Sanguinet as a member of the Coalition Avenir Québec and is the former Minister of Health.

McCann's responsibilities as Minister of Health and Social Services included the COVID-19 pandemic in Quebec. In June 2020 during cabinet shuffle she was assigned to the Ministry of Higher Education. After the Controversy over academic freedom at the University of Ottawa McCann as Minister of Higher Education pushed for Bill 32 an bill on Academic freedom in universities. which passed in June 2022. She decided not to run in the 2022 provincial election and retired from politics.

== Electoral record ==
2018 Quebec general election: Sanguinet
Party	Candidate	Votes	%	±%
Coalition Avenir Québec	Danielle McCann	12,986	43.54	+11.77
Parti Québécois	Alain Therrien	7,389	24.77	-10.29
Québec solidaire	Maya Fréchette-Bonnier	4,390	14.72	+11.25
Liberal	Marcelina Jugureanu	4,169	13.98	-11.38
Green	Antonino Geraci	456	1.53	
Conservative	Nikolai Grigoriev	355	1.19	+0.45
Marxist–Leninist	Hélène Héroux	81	0.27	-0.13
Total valid votes		29,826	97.98	
Total rejected ballots		616	2.02	
Turnout		30,442	72.45	
Eligible voters		42,016		
Coalition Avenir Québec gain from Parti Québécois		Swing		+11.03
Source(s) "Rapport des résultats officiels du scrutin". Élections Québec.

== Cabinet posts ==
Quebec provincial government of François Legault
Cabinet post (1)
Predecessor	Office	Successor
Gaetan Barrette	Minister of Health and Social Services; October 18, 2018–June 22, 2020	Christian Dubé
