= Rémy Trudel =

Canadian politician and professor

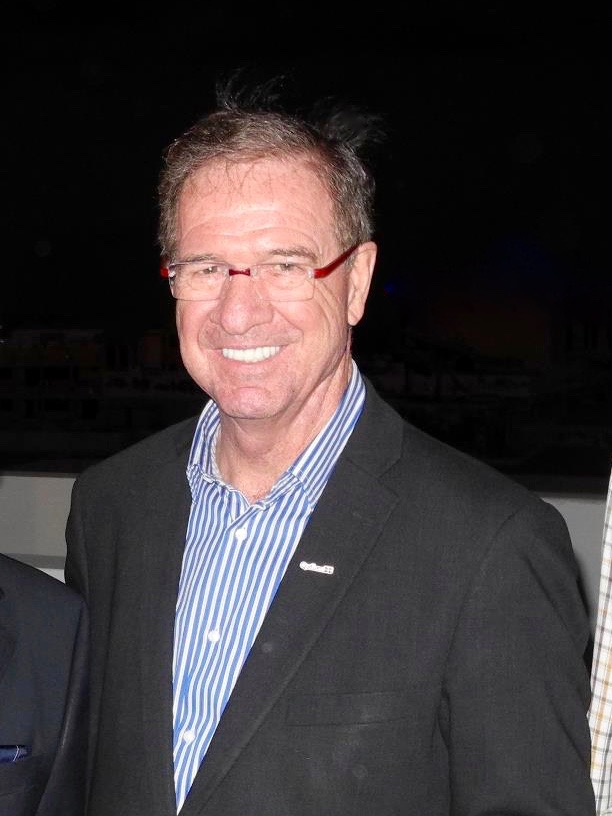

Rémy Trudel (born April 20, 1948) is a university professor and a former Quebec politician. A member of the Parti Québécois, he served as Member of the National Assembly for Rouyn-Noranda–Témiscamingue from 1989 to 2003. In 1988, he was one of the star candidates for the New Democratic Party in the riding of Témiscamingue. He lost the election by about 3,500 votes.

Trudel was born in Sainte-Thècle. He has a bachelor's degree in pedagogy from Université Laval, a bachelor's degree in education sciences from the Université du Québec à Trois-Rivières and a doctor's degree in education administration from the University of Ottawa.

He served in a number of ministerial posts in the governments of Lucien Bouchard and Bernard Landry including agriculture, aboriginal affairs, and immigration. He was Minister of Health and Social Services in the government of Bernard Landry from 2001 to 2002. He currently teaches at the University of Quebec in Abitibi-Témiscamingue.

| Preceded by Pauline Marois | Minister of Health and Social Services; 2001–2002 | Succeeded by François Legault |
