= Quebec family reunification delays =

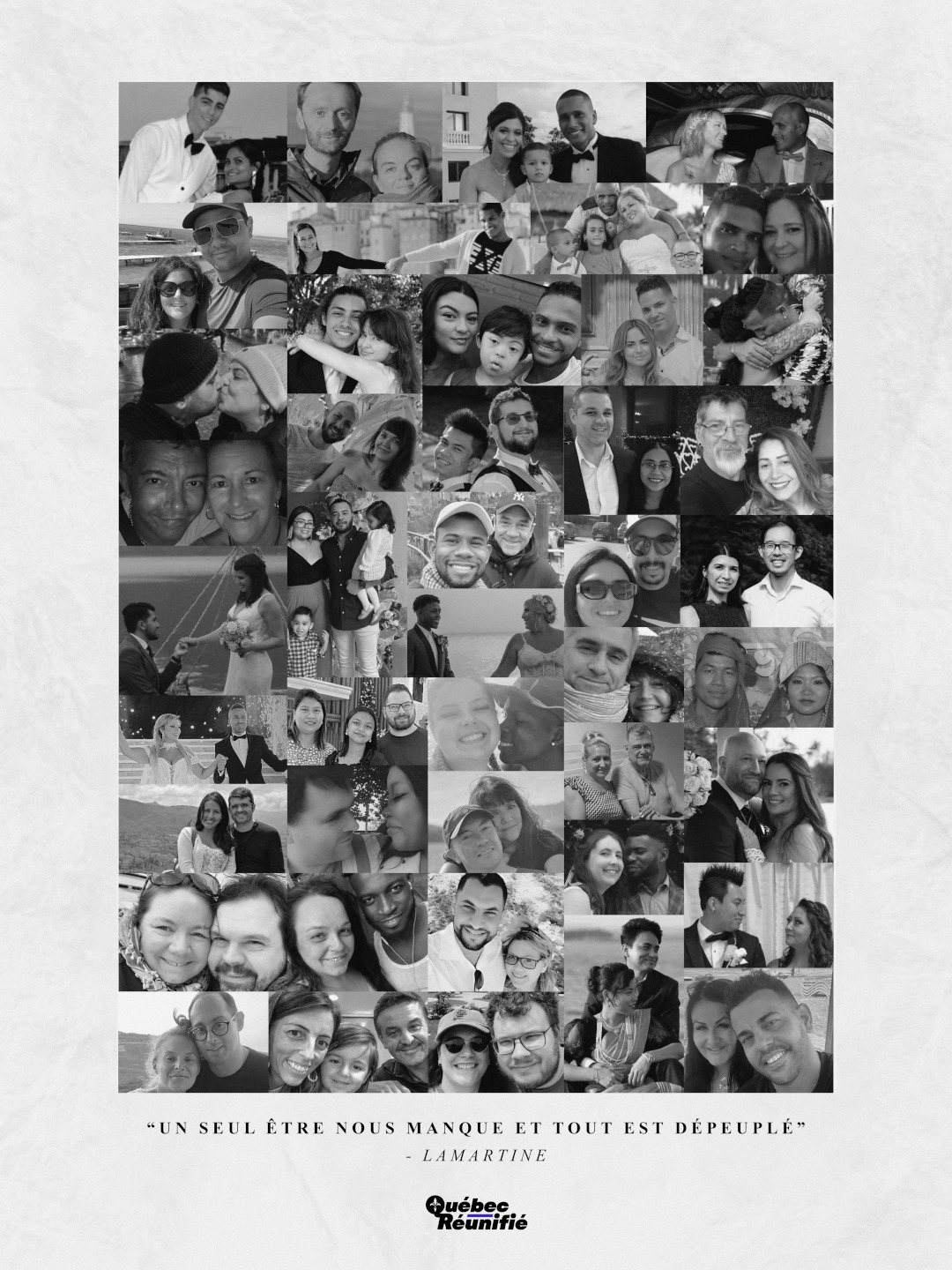
Poster with families affected by delays of three years or more

Quebec family reunification delays refer to Quebec immigration policies that have resulted in a delay between the demand for family reunification and the fulfilment of such requests. Marked by quantitative restrictions and wait times that have more than tripled, families face a prolonged process to reunite with their family members. By 2024, this increase in wait times of more than three years contrasts with other Canadian provinces, where the process usually takes 13 months. The family reunification policy adopted by the Coalition Avenir Québec (CAQ) government was described by the Canadian Broadcasting Corporation as causing "enormous distress among the families affected".

The lengthy wait period for family reunification has exposed many couples to intense emotional stress, amplifying concerns related to fertility, parenthood, and testing the stability of their marital unions. Being in the midst of administrative delays while processing their applications, these couples face the difficult situation of living apart for years. This circumstance has put so much pressure on some relationships that some have contemplated separation as a solution to the emotional wear and tear experienced. Moreover, it has contributed to difficult decisions such as unwanted abortion.

A study conducted by the Institut Universitaire Jeunes en Difficulté (IUJD), involving 146 families who experienced reunification in Quebec, showed how repeated relational disruptions can have significant psychosocial consequences for children both in the short and long term. The traumatic effects of family separation on children are well-documented, including higher rates of PTSD and depressive disorders that can persist into adulthood, negatively impacting academic performance, relationship formation, and mental health. The family separation policy has been actively opposed by health professionals and medical organizations, being described by the American Academy of Pediatrics as "government-sanctioned child abuse" and by Physicians for Human Rights as consistent with the legal definition of torture and temporary enforced disappearance under international human rights law.

The website of Québec Réunifié has published a report showing how Quebec is the only government that imposes quotas. Wait times for family reunification are the longest in the world, noting that even far-right European governments do not implement measures comparable to the quotas mentioned. Multiple authoritative sources have classified the situation as a critical humanitarian crisis.

== Context ==
Family reunification in Canada is one of the main immigration categories, allowing Canadian citizens or permanent residents to sponsor their close relatives to join them in Canada and obtain permanent residency. Sponsorship is generally limited to spouses, common-law partners, conjugal partners, and their dependent children, although under exceptional circumstances, other family members may be eligible under specific conditions. To be a valid sponsor, one must meet certain financial requirements set by Immigration, Refugees and Citizenship Canada (IRCC), including the commitment to provide for the basic needs of the sponsored without resorting to government assistance, the duration of which varies depending on the age of the sponsored.

There are various myths surrounding immigration through family reunification, such as the misconception that it contributes to housing shortages, economic recession, or overburdens the Canadian healthcare system. Sponsored individuals must be financially supported by their sponsors and pass health and background checks. Additionally, the importance of verifying the authenticity of relationships to prevent marriage fraud is emphasized.

The notion of family reunification as an immigration category has held a "strong and enduring" position in the context of Canadian immigration. The variety of individuals who could be included in the family reunification category has varied from only spouses and direct relatives to any relative regardless of degree. For most of the 20th century, the range of relatives who could be sponsored remained quite stable, except for brief periods of change.

=== Historical background ===
Canadian immigration policy, from the Immigration Act of 1910 to 1978, demonstrated explicit and implicit discriminatory and racist practices against various ethnic groups. This legislation granted Cabinet the power to prohibit entry to Canada for immigrants from any race it deemed undesirable, based on their customs, habits, modes of living, methods of owning property, and their supposed inability to assimilate easily. A notable example of the exercise of this power was the Council Order of March 14, 1919, which prohibited the entry of immigrants of German, Austrian, Hungarian, Bulgarian, or Turkish races, except with the permission of the Minister of Immigration. Additionally, in 1919, this power was invoked to ban the landing in Canada of Dukhobors, Hutterites, and Mennonites.

The Asian race was subjected to an entry ban in 1923, with certain exceptions that were removed in 1930, leaving only the possibility of entry for immediate family, until this ban was lifted in 1956. The immigration regulations of 1954 and 1956 limited admissions to citizens of specifically listed countries, maintaining implicit discrimination until 1962, when a general entry requirement was applied to all, giving preference to those with extended family in Canada. The Immigration Act also included powers to impose financial requirements based on race, as evidenced in 1908 and 1914, when Asian immigrants were required to possess a significantly larger minimum amount of money than other immigrants. Additionally, a continuous journey regulation was imposed which, in practice, excluded immigrants from certain regions, such as India, due to the impossibility of making a direct journey to Canada.

Discrimination also specifically extended to individuals of Chinese and Japanese origin, with acts and regulations that severely restricted their entry and residence in Canada, including elevated entry fees and, in the case of Canadian citizens of Japanese descent, deportation during and after World War II. Discrimination against Jews, although not codified in specific laws, was executed through the abuse of discretion by immigration authorities, effectively denying entry to Canada to Jews fleeing Nazi persecution and the Holocaust. A period in which laws and regulations were used explicitly and implicitly to exclude individuals and groups based on their race, nationality, or ethnicity, until legislative changes began to remove these discriminatory practices in the 1960s and 1970s, seeking to establish admission criteria that did not discriminate on the basis of race, national or ethnic origin, color, religion, or sex.

=== Two-tier immigration system ===
The "two-tier immigration system" refers to how immigration policy proposals in the province of Quebec result in preferential treatment for economic immigrants (those selected based on their ability to contribute to the economy, such as skilled workers) at the expense of other categories, such as those seeking family reunification. Under such a system:

- First tier: Economic immigrants who would be admitted more quickly due to the perception that they fill an immediate labor gap or meet economic needs. These immigrants might have access to more resources, a faster application process, or more flexible rules.
- Second tier: Other immigrants, such as those coming through family reunification programs or as refugees. These immigrants might face longer waiting times, fewer resources, or stricter criteria.

The use of the term "two-tier immigration system" carries a negative connotation, suggesting it is unfair or discriminatory by granting preferential treatment to one group over another. The creation of such systems can generate political and social tensions and is a subject of debate in many nations struggling to balance economic needs with humanitarian and familial considerations.

While this new approach would benefit businesses by providing them with the necessary talent, it is anticipated to prolong waiting times for those seeking family reunification. Currently, the waiting time in Quebec to process a family reunification application is about 34 months. The proportion of economic immigrants rises to 65%, this time increases to three years, according to federal sources. This has an unintended side effect, as skilled immigrants whom Quebec opts for may move to other provinces or territories of Canada, instead of facing long periods of separation from their families.

=== Immigration policies and quotas ===
Unlike other Canadian provinces, Quebec has the autonomy to decide the number of permanent residents it accepts annually, including those selected for family reunification. This implies obtaining the Quebec Selection Certificate (CSQ) in addition to federal approval by Immigration, Refugees and Citizenship Canada (IRCC). This dual-layered processing has resulted in significant delays, particularly evidenced in the processing times for family reunification, which currently triple the average deadlines compared to the rest of Canada, exceeding 34 months.

In Quebec, there is a tensioned system due to the discrepancy between the number of applications and the available spaces for family reunification. The province of Quebec has set admission caps for family reunification, which have practically been reached for the current year.

These delays are largely attributed to the annual quotas imposed by the government of the Coalition Avenir Québec (CAQ), establishing a limit of 10,400 family reunification cases that can be processed annually, a figure that falls short of the demand, evidenced by the 38,600 files waiting.

The Quebec government has decided to halve the capacity for processing family reunification applications over the next two years. According to the Gazette Officielle du Québec published on June 26, 2024, up to June 2026, a maximum of 13,000 applications will be processed, compared to the 26,416 applications processed between 2021 and 2023. This measure has raised concerns among Quebec residents who wish to reunite with their foreign family members, now facing an average waiting time of 34 months, in contrast to the 10 months in the rest of Canada. Premier François Legault justified the decision, arguing that it is necessary to limit the number of immigrants to ensure the government's ability to provide services and protect the French language. Immigration Minister Christine Fréchette indicated that priority will be given to pending files before accepting new applications, except in specific cases such as the sponsorship of minors under 18. The Quebec government explained that instead of processing new applications, it will focus on files that have been pending for months or even years. This measure has been criticized for its significant impact on families, who will now have to wait even longer to reunite. The Quebec Association of Immigration Lawyers has requested that the federal Immigration Minister ensure family reunification applicants in Quebec receive the same processing times as the rest of the country.

==== Sponsorship of parents and grandparents ====
The Federal Court of Appeal of Canada ruled that immigration processes for family reunification must be equitable for all relatives, including parents, grandparents, spouses, and children, following a complaint by Amir Attaran, a Law professor at the University of Ottawa. Attaran argued that there was discrimination against his parents, elderly U.S. citizens, who faced delays in their immigration process after applying for sponsorship in 2009. This case highlights criticism towards Immigration Canada for the slow handling of sponsorship applications for parents and grandparents, compared to other more agile immigration processes. Attaran took his case to the Canadian Human Rights Commission in 2010, accusing age discrimination due to his parents' prolonged 37-month wait, though initially, his complaint was dismissed. The Court, however, found Attaran's concern to be reasonable, noting that while age discrimination was not confirmed, the significant and differentiated delays did constitute a discriminatory practice. This underscores an unequal allocation of resources within Immigration Canada, primarily affecting the family reunification processes of parents and grandparents. The Court's decision questions the initial dismissal of the complaint by the human rights commission and emphasizes the need for equitable treatment in family reunification procedures.

Despite the Super Visa not requiring to go through a lottery and being available throughout the year, criticisms point to the need to meet income requirements according to the Low-Income Cut Off (LICO), obtain an invitation letter that includes financial support, and secure Canadian medical coverage for a year, which can be a costly and excluding process for some. This situation in Quebec highlights tensions between federal and provincial policies and raises questions about the effectiveness and equity of family reunification programs. The underlying critique of this process focuses on the complexity and prolonged waiting that affects families and undermines the intention of promoting cultural and familial integration in the province.

=== Increase in waiting times and emotional effects ===
In Quebec, there is a tensioned system due to the discrepancy between the number of applications and the available spaces for family reunification. The province of Quebec has set maximum admission limits for family reunification, which have practically been reached for the current year. This has caused the federal government to be unable to speed up the processing of applications without exceeding the quotas set by the Legault government. Waiting times to sponsor a spouse living abroad have doubled compared to other Canadian provinces, increasing from 27 to 34 months, almost three years, while in other provinces it remains at 13 months. This increase in waiting times is due to a limit on the number of spaces available for family reunification in Quebec, causing the number of waiting families to grow, reaching 38,800 in July. Behind this scenario is a quota policy set by the government of François Legault, which limits the number of annual admissions and has generated a backlog of nearly 40,000 pending cases, highlighting not only bureaucratic difficulties but also the emotional and social impact on the involved families.

The Quebec Ministry of Immigration has expressed understanding of the stress these delays cause to families and has attributed the responsibility to the federal government. The handling of cases after the issuance of Quebec selection certificates is the responsibility of the federal government, which admits individuals according to the goals set by Quebec. The federal government, for its part, faces its own challenges with significant delays in its programs, as highlighted in the report by the Auditor General of Canada. Opposition critics argue that the Legault government has the capacity to act to reduce the wait for thousands of families. However, with the maximum admission nearly reached, the federal government has difficulty speeding up applications without exceeding quotas. This has led to criticism from opposition immigration spokespeople, who suggest that delays will continue to increase and raise the risk of legal action for excessive delays.

Monsef Derraji, spokesperson for the Quebec Liberal Party on immigration matters, describes the situation as inhumane, highlighting the emotional difficulty of separated families and questioning the insistence of the provincial government. Additionally, members of groups like Québec Réunifié emphasize the importance of the public understanding that family reunification could affect anyone in the future. Experts suggest that the Quebec government could modify the percentages of its immigration thresholds, decreasing the proportion of economic immigrants and increasing that of family reunification, a category considered to have been overlooked in the immigration plan but essential for society.

== Causes ==
=== Racism in the Immigration system ===
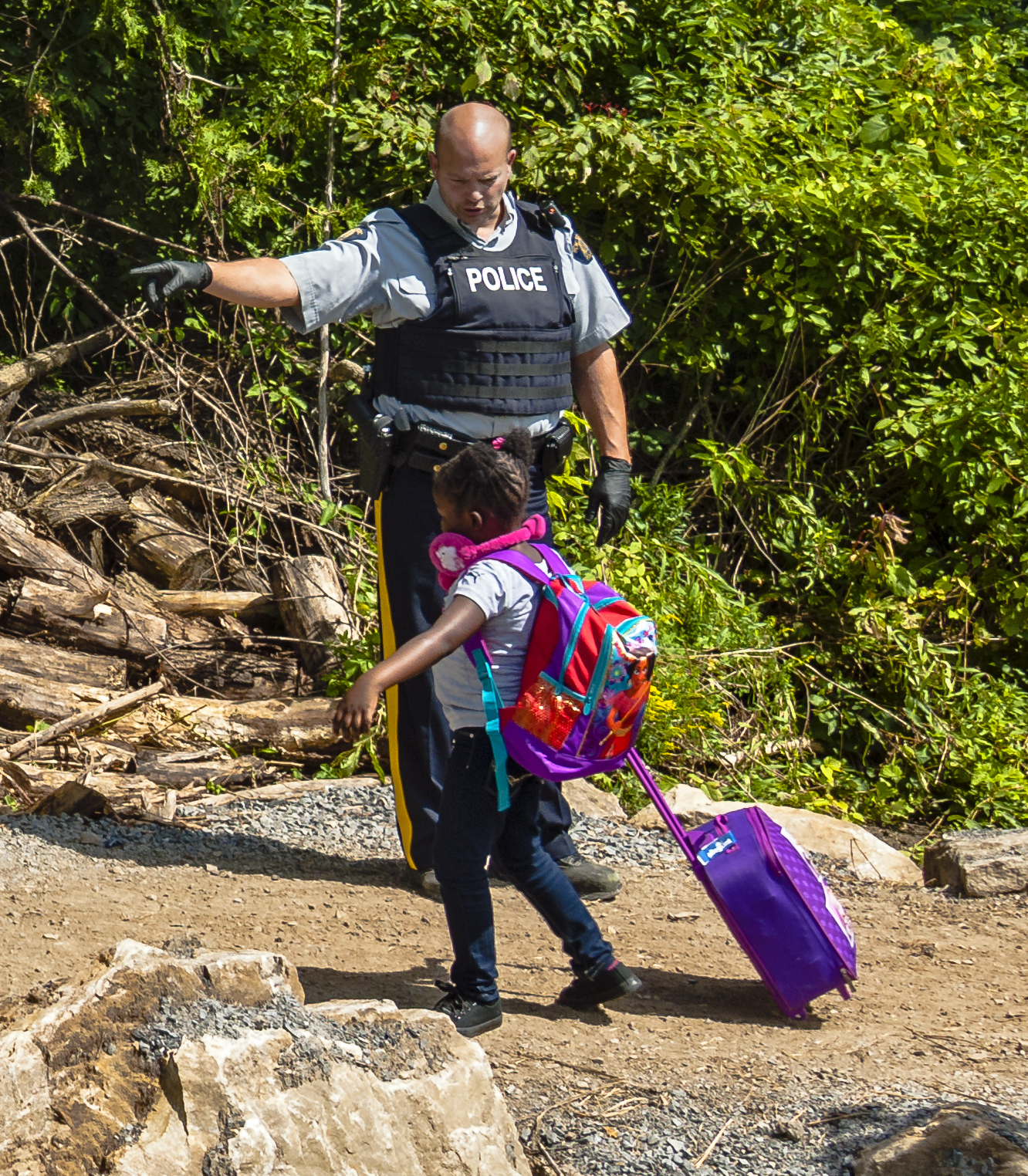
Official guiding a girl entering the Canadian border

In response to a report by the Standing Committee on Citizenship and Immigration of the House of Commons, the Department of Immigration, Refugees and Citizenship Canada (IRCC) has acknowledged the existence of systemic racism within its immigration system. This acknowledgment comes after the presentation of the report "Differential Treatment in the Recruitment and Acceptance Rates of Foreign Students in Quebec and the Rest of Canada," which highlighted rejection rates of up to 80% for Francophone immigrants from African countries. IRCC published a report in 2021, in which employees complained about repeated instances of offensive language towards racialized colleagues and limited advancement opportunities for racialized minorities. The investigations did not surprise two federal officials who, fearing workplace retaliation, spoke with CBC News under the condition of anonymity, describing a work environment where staff are constantly monitored and pressured to handle as many calls as possible, even affecting bathroom breaks. They also reported racist attitudes towards immigration applicants from certain countries and a reluctance to promote employees of color within the department.

Immigration, Refugees and Citizenship Canada (IRCC) has initiated an investigation into potential cultural biases among its employees regarding the processing of visa applications at the country's entry points. This investigation is a response to a previous study that revealed multiple reports of racist "microaggressions" by employees and supervisors. Interviews suggested that both overt and subtle racism, observed among employees and decision-makers in IRCC, "can and probably does affect case processing." Jasraj Singh Hallan, an MP from the Calgary area and shadow immigration minister of the Conservative Party, expressed concern about IRCC's inability to address racist behavior in the workplace and its effect on massive delays in visa applications and refugee processing times.

The investigation, conducted from February to June of this year at a cost of $59,000, included focus groups with both racialized and non-racialized employees, aiming to understand current experiences of racism and perceptions of how racism is managed by the administration, gathering suggestions for future changes in policies and practices. Findings reveal microaggressions, discrimination in hiring practices and access to professional growth opportunities, as well as racial biases in the application of programs, policies, and customer services at IRCC. Additionally, a lack of clear guidelines or training for management on how to handle reports of racism, a history of inadequately addressed racism, and an imbalance in racial representation in management were found. Despite initiatives, study participants remain skeptical, believing the problem is deeply rooted in organizational culture and the values of those in power. They consider that proposed solutions, such as establishing an Anti-Racism Secretariat or requiring intercultural competence to become an executive, could have little concrete impact against systemic racism. Workers also noted that resources deployed so far are "temporary and insufficient," and initiatives are "underfunded".

==== Differential treatment among Visa Offices ====
On March 16, 2022, an article by Susan Korah highlighted criticisms towards the Canadian government for differential treatment in its programs, depending on geographical origin. While aid to Ukrainian refugees has been widely praised, refugee rights advocates and Canadians from the Global South have pointed out an apparently discriminatory policy towards other groups. Despite the shared belief that an immigrant deserves protection regardless of their race, ethnicity, or the political dynamics that forced them to flee, these communities observe with mixed emotions the reception of more than a million Ukrainians, reflecting preferential treatment in contrast to their own experiences marked by obstacles to safety.

A study, conducted in Quebec, Canada, between April 1, 2002, and March 31, 2011, examined family reunification outcomes for 1,395 Black children. The results indicated that these children were less likely to experience family reunification compared to other children. The discretion given to immigration officers and the preference in the points system for highly educated candidates proficient in French or English, more likely to be from predominantly white and "developed" countries, indicated that discrimination persisted. The introduction of a non-discriminatory policy was also seen as a result of Canada's growing need for labor and skills that traditional European countries could no longer provide. Criticism of Canada's immigration policies, particularly from Caribbean countries, showed the continued preference for immigrants from countries that historically had supplied immigrants, despite the formal abolition of racial discrimination. The use of derogatory stereotypes to describe potential immigrants from the Caribbean and the justification of discrimination in the administrative application of regulations revealed a persistence of racism and discrimination in Canada's immigration policies.

The following chart presents data on temporary resident visa applications for spouses and partners abroad, processed up to November 7, 2020. It provides a breakdown by the top ten nationalities of applicants, indicating the number of approved and rejected applications, as well as the corresponding rejection rate.

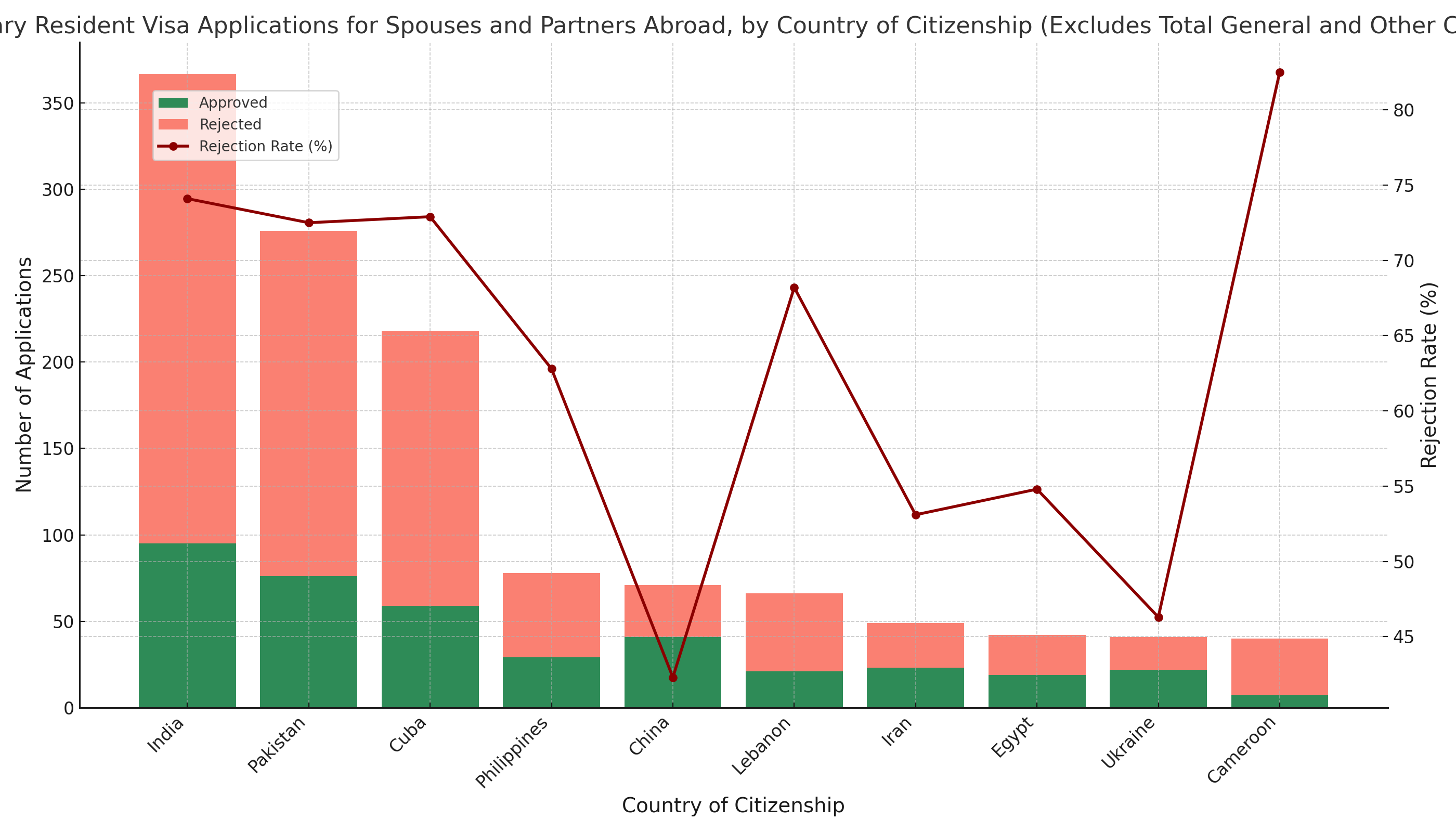
Number of Temporary Resident Visa Applications Approved and Rejected for Spouses and Partners Abroad in Processing Inventory, Broken Down by the Top 10 Countries of Citizenship as of November 7, 2020, in Persons. Source: Steven Meurrens @smeurrens. Tweets about Canadian immigration law and policy.

=== Inconsistencies in the family sponsorship process ===
The Quebec immigration system, an integral part of Canada's immigration policies, exhibits certain inconsistencies that affect citizens and permanent residents interested in sponsoring their family members, including spouses, children, or parents. Although sponsoring loved ones is allowed, the associated processes can extend for more than three years, leading many to apply for visitor visas as an interim measure to facilitate family reunion during the wait. However, these visitor visa applications are often denied due to the perception of a strong family tie in Canada, which is considered a risk factor for unplanned permanent immigration, thereby exacerbating family isolation and estrangement. Immigration lawyer, Yves Martineau, warns that waiting times could extend even further, highlighting the discrepancy between current policies and the family reunification objectives established in Quebec's immigration law.

For spouses of citizens or residents, there is the possibility of obtaining a temporary work visa while waiting for the sponsorship process to complete. However, this option is only viable if the applicant is already within Canadian territory. The paradox arises when those seeking to enter Canada to reunite with their spouse face denial of their visitor visa due to their marriage to a Canadian resident or citizen, which in practice prevents them from accessing the offered temporary work visa. This set of circumstances creates a difficult situation where, despite provisions for family reunification, current policies can force families to remain separated for extended periods.

Family reunification immigration in Quebec has significantly decreased, dropping from 13,896 in 2021 to 12,904 in 2022, and is projected to remain between 10,200 and 10,600 for 2023 and 2024. This reduction indicates a possible prioritization of other immigration categories and adjustments in provincial immigration policies, stabilizing at lower but consistent levels with those of 2022.

Number of people admitted to Quebec
Regular Admissions	2021	2022	PLAN 2023 MIN.	PLAN 2023 MAX.	FORECAST 2023 MIN.	FORECAST 2023 MAX.	PLAN 2024 MIN.	PLAN 2024 MAX.
Economic Immigration	26,854	45,532	32,000	33,900	31,700	34,500	31,000	32,900
Skilled Workers	25,042	40,055	28,000	29,500	27,400	30,100	29,800	31,500
Entrepreneurs	1,686	5,196	4,000	4,300	4,300	4,300	1,200	1,300
Other Economic Categories	126	281	0	100	0	100	0	100
Family Reunification	13,896	12,904	10,200	10,600	10,600	11,000	10,200	10,600
Refugees and Similar Situations	7,284	7,809	6,900	7,500	5,300	6,600	6,900	7,500
Refugees Selected Abroad	1,600	3,755	4,400	4,700	2,400	2,800	3,500	3,800
State-Sponsored Refugees	963	1,744	1,650	1,700	1,300	1,400	1,650	1,700
Sponsored Refugees	637	2,017	2,500	3,000	1,100	1,400	1,850	2,100
Refugees Recognized on Site	5,684	4,054	2,350	2,800	2,900	3,000	3,400	3,700
Other Immigrants	2,241	2,459	400	500	800	1,000	400	500
Total	50,275	68,704	49,500	52,500	48,400	53,100	48,500	51,500
Statistics
Part of Quebec Selection	61 %	75 %	74 %	74 %	72 %	72 %	72 %	72 %
Part of Economic Immigration	53 %	66 %	65 %	65 %	65 %	65 %	64 %	64 %
Proportion of Immigrants Knowing French	69 %	68 %	66 %	66 %	66 %	66 %	67 %	67 %
Proportion of Adult Immigrants Knowing French	73 %	75 %			69 %	69 %	71 %	71 %
Proportion of French Knowledge in Economic Immigration (Principal Applicants)	93 %	88 %			81 %	81 %	89 %	89 %
Proportion of On-Site Persons	58 %	49 %			42 %	42 %	47 %	47 %
Admissions Outside Regular Targets (Estimation)
Skilled Workers Selected in the Quebec Experience Program, "Quebec Graduates" Component							6,500	
Processing of Entrepreneur Applications					1,400	1,900	5,400	6,600

Analyzing the table as a whole, immigration to Quebec has experienced a significant increase from 50,275 people admitted in 2021 to 68,704 in 2022. This increase is mainly due to a rise in economic immigration, which nearly doubled from 26,854 to 45,532, reflecting a priority focus on attracting skilled workers and entrepreneurs. On the other hand, the category of refugees and similar situations remained relatively stable, while family reunification showed a reduction. The forecasts and plans for 2023 and 2024 suggest a stabilization of total numbers in the range of 48,500 to 53,100, with a continued focus on economic immigration. The statistics also indicate a high percentage of immigrants with knowledge of French, especially in the economic category, highlighting the importance of language in Quebec's immigration policies.

Spousal Sponsorship Canada Application Flowchart

=== Quebec selection process ===
In Quebec, the leader of the CAQ, Francois Legault, has controversially linked immigration with "violence" and "extremism." He has also expressed concern about the threat posed by immigration of non-French speakers to the "national cohesion" of the province. Despite Legault's apologies for his comments, the debate on immigration has been described as superficial, focused on numbers and ambiguous concepts such as the province's integration capacity. Experts and academics offer varied opinions on the issue. Pierre Fortin, Professor Emeritus of Economics at the Université du Quebec à Montréal, calls the figure proposed by Blackburn "unreasonable," warning it could lead to administrative chaos and foster xenophobic and racist attitudes towards immigrants. On the other hand, Mireille Paquet, Professor of Political Science at Concordia University, questions this theory, indicating that research does not provide definitive answers and that adverse reactions against immigrants are not so much due to their numbers but to feelings of insecurity among the non-immigrant population, feelings that can be exacerbated by public policies such as cuts in social services.

Various human rights and immigrant support organizations have expressed their alarm at statements made by members of the Coalition Avenir Québec government, accusing them of contributing to a climate of anxiety by attributing the public services crisis to immigrants. This situation has been compared by some critics to an "extremely worrying trend of xenophobic populism" observed in Europe and other parts of the world. France-Isabelle Langlois, director of Amnesty International Canada, expressed her outrage, especially at comments made by the Minister of the French Language, Jean-François Roberge, who claimed that the "Quebecois identity" is threatened by immigrants, which was interpreted as a discourse inciting hatred and xenophobia.

==== Government quota policy of François Legault ====
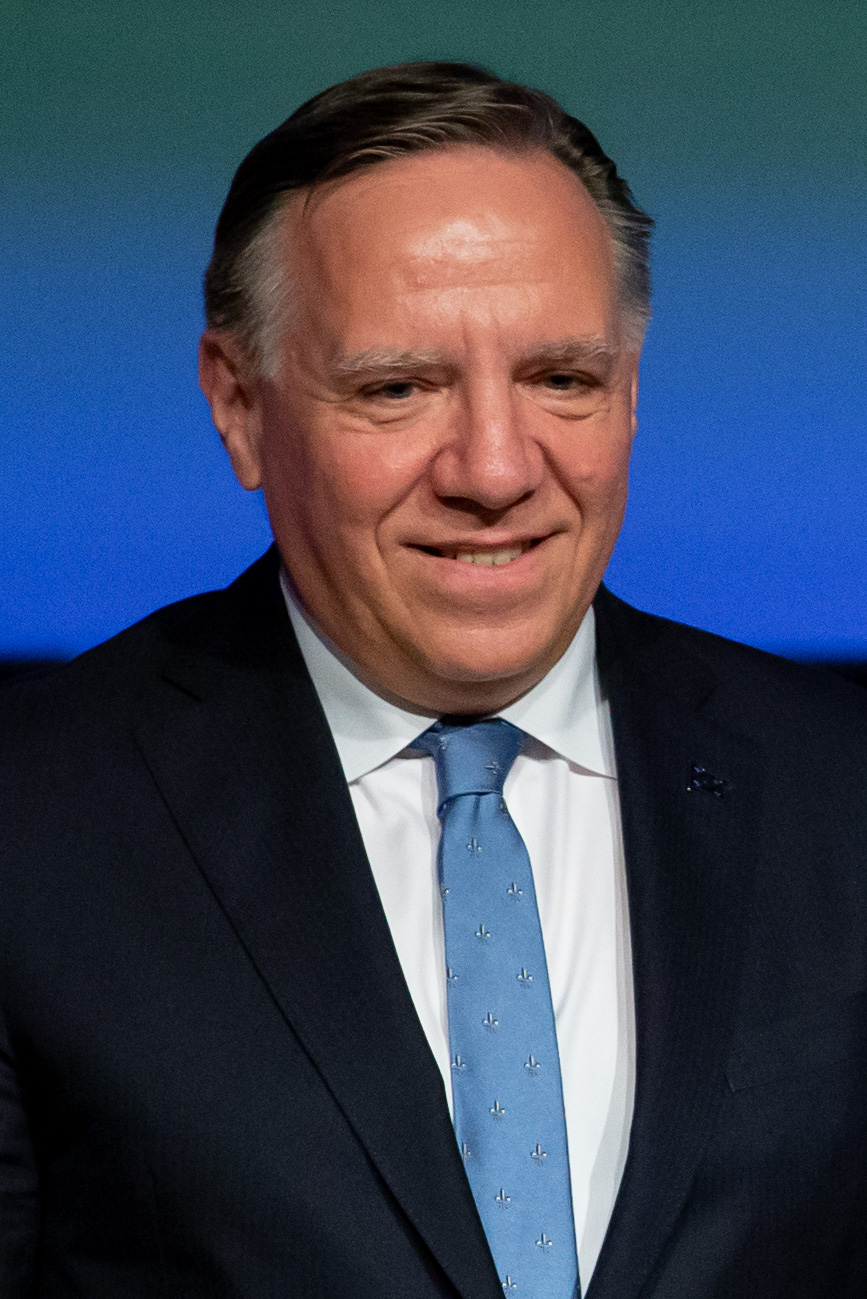
François Legault, leader of the CAQ

The most critical aspect of this situation is the limited number of annual admissions set by the government of François Legault, approximately 10,400, despite an inventory of nearly 40,000 pending cases. This limitation creates a bottleneck, leading to a backlog of cases and great distress among affected couples. According to Me Lapointe, the provincial government, under the Canada-Quebec Agreement specifying each level of government's role in immigration matters, does not have the authority to impose a quota in the family reunification category. However, by processing only the number of cases desired by the Legault government, Ottawa would also be violating the terms of this agreement.

==== Discrepancy in applications and admissions ====
This has caused the federal government to be unable to speed up the processing of applications without exceeding the quotas set by the Legault government. Waiting times to sponsor a spouse living abroad have doubled compared to other Canadian provinces, increasing from 33 to 41 months, almost three years, while in other provinces they remain at 13 months. This increase in waiting times is due to a limit on the number of spaces available for family reunification in Quebec, causing the number of waiting families to grow, reaching 38,800 in July 2023.

The immigration policy of the Quebec government for the period 2024-2027 has deprioritized the family reunification category, raising concerns due to restrictive quotas and long processing times. According to revealed data, there is a notable disparity between the annual quotas set (between 10,400 and 11,000) and the current number of pending applications (38,400, according to Radio-Canada), managed both by Immigration, Refugees and Citizenship Canada (IRCC) and the Ministère de l'Immigration, de la Francisation et de l'Intégration du Québec (MIFI). As of December 5, processing times for applications to Quebec showed a significant increase, with 41 months for external applications, compared with 12 months for the rest of Canada.

A survey commissioned by Québec Réunifié aimed to identify the demographic characteristics of individuals involved in the family reunification process for spouses or partners, providing detailed insight to MIFI authorities. The survey was conducted online, from December 2 to 5, 2023, with the participation of 230 respondents who had spouse or partner reunification requests in process, all over the age of 18. The survey, lasting 10 minutes, was written and analyzed by Nathalie Coursin, with a decade of experience in market research in France and Quebec. The results of the survey, although not probabilistic due to its online invitation nature, suggest variability in waiting times, with the longest for external applications, averaging 42 months as of December 6, 2023. This condition affects the majority of the sponsorship applications in the study, with 65% of the total. Waiting times for internal applications in Quebec reach 26 months, in contrast to 10 to 12 months for the rest of Canada.

Most sponsors are Canadian citizens wishing to bring exclusively their partners, not including descendants or ancestors in most cases. Additionally, a strong desire to learn French among the sponsored was observed, with a significant proportion already speaking the language or interested in learning it before and after their arrival in Quebec. Regarding housing, nearly all sponsors reported having sufficient capacity in their homes to accommodate their partners. The geographic distribution of the partners indicates dispersion across various regions of Quebec, not limited solely to Montreal. Finally, the professional profile of the sponsored shows a diversity that promises to significantly contribute to Quebec's economy, underscoring the beneficial potential of this immigration category for the strengthening of the French language in the province.

=== Political theater between Quebec and Ottawa ===
The political situation in Quebec seems to follow a global trend where leaders like Matteo Salvini, Viktor Orbán, and Donald Trump have popularized xenophobic discourses in regions where they previously lacked influence. It's a reminder that Quebec, a land traditionally welcoming to immigrants, faces new challenges in the contemporary political landscape. While Canada seeks to reinforce its commitment to immigration, planning to welcome a record number of new immigrants, adding 1.45 million to its population of 39 million by 2023. Even though immigration has generated divisions and the rise of political extremism in other Western countries, Canada generally maintains a widespread consensus on its value. However, Quebec has been a notable exception, with politicians exacerbating anti-immigrant sentiments, leveraging the fears of Franco-Quebecois voters over the loss of their cultural identity.

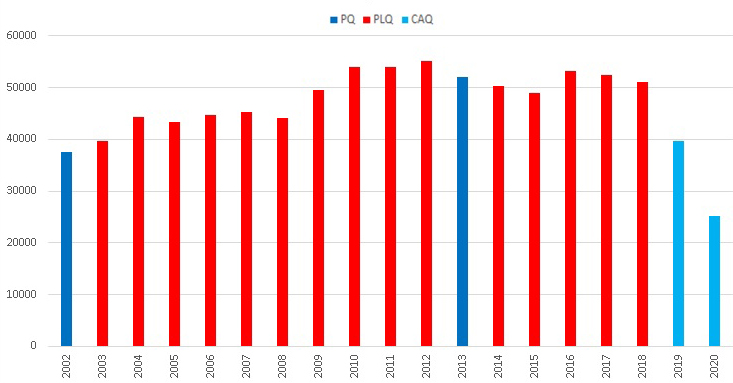
Number of immigrants received in Quebec according to the government in place from 2002 to 2020

The government of Quebec deploys a complex strategy aimed at winning the favor of voters and consolidating the support of different population sectors. This strategy is manifested in the dynamic interaction between political discourses, administrative decisions, and legal actions, all aimed at addressing citizen concerns and shaping public opinion. In this scenario, politicians and political parties strive to present themselves as defenders of citizen interests, whether by advocating for greater autonomy in immigration policy decisions, as in the case of Quebec, or seeking to accelerate family reunification processes to alleviate humanitarian situations, as done by the Federal Government. Both levels of government use these issues as vehicles to demonstrate their commitment to the needs and desires of their electorates, often resulting in a balancing act between asserting their authority and competencies, and effectively responding to social demands.

The dispute between the Quebec government and the federal government of Canada over immigration targets has escalated to the point where some voices have suggested holding a referendum on the matter. This situation was triggered following Ottawa's announcement to process approximately 20,500 pending permanent residence applications in Quebec's family reunification program. Quebec has responded by alleging that the federal government is exceeding its competencies.

Quebec's Immigration Minister, Christine Fréchette stating that Ottawa must respect Quebec's independence

Quebec's Minister of Immigration, Christine Fréchette, has accused her federal counterpart, Marc Miller, of engaging in "a confrontation with Quebec's competencies" by threatening to exceed the limits set by Quebec in the area of family reunification. This accusation arises in response to Miller's decision to increase, if necessary, the threshold for this immigration category, in order to accelerate the processing of applications in Quebec, where delays are almost three times longer than in the rest of Canada for sponsoring a spouse living abroad.

Miller has justified his decision citing "a moral duty to find a solution to this problem" and has announced his decision to instruct his ministry to process the permanent residence applications of family reunification applicants who have received a Certificat de sélection du Québec (CSQ), amounting to approximately 20,500 applications as of January 31, 2024. This move has been criticized by Fréchette as unacceptable, arguing that Quebec alone determines its permanent immigration targets and that such a decision would have a significant impact on Quebec's permanent immigration limits. Conversely, Miller's decision has been met with relief by thousands of waiting families, who have been facing long delays in family reunification. Affected organizations and individuals have expressed their hope that this measure may lead to concrete results and a final resolution of the crisis. Meanwhile, political figures of various inclinations have shared their perspectives, criticizing or supporting the actions of both ministers.

=== Anti-Immigrant sentiment ===
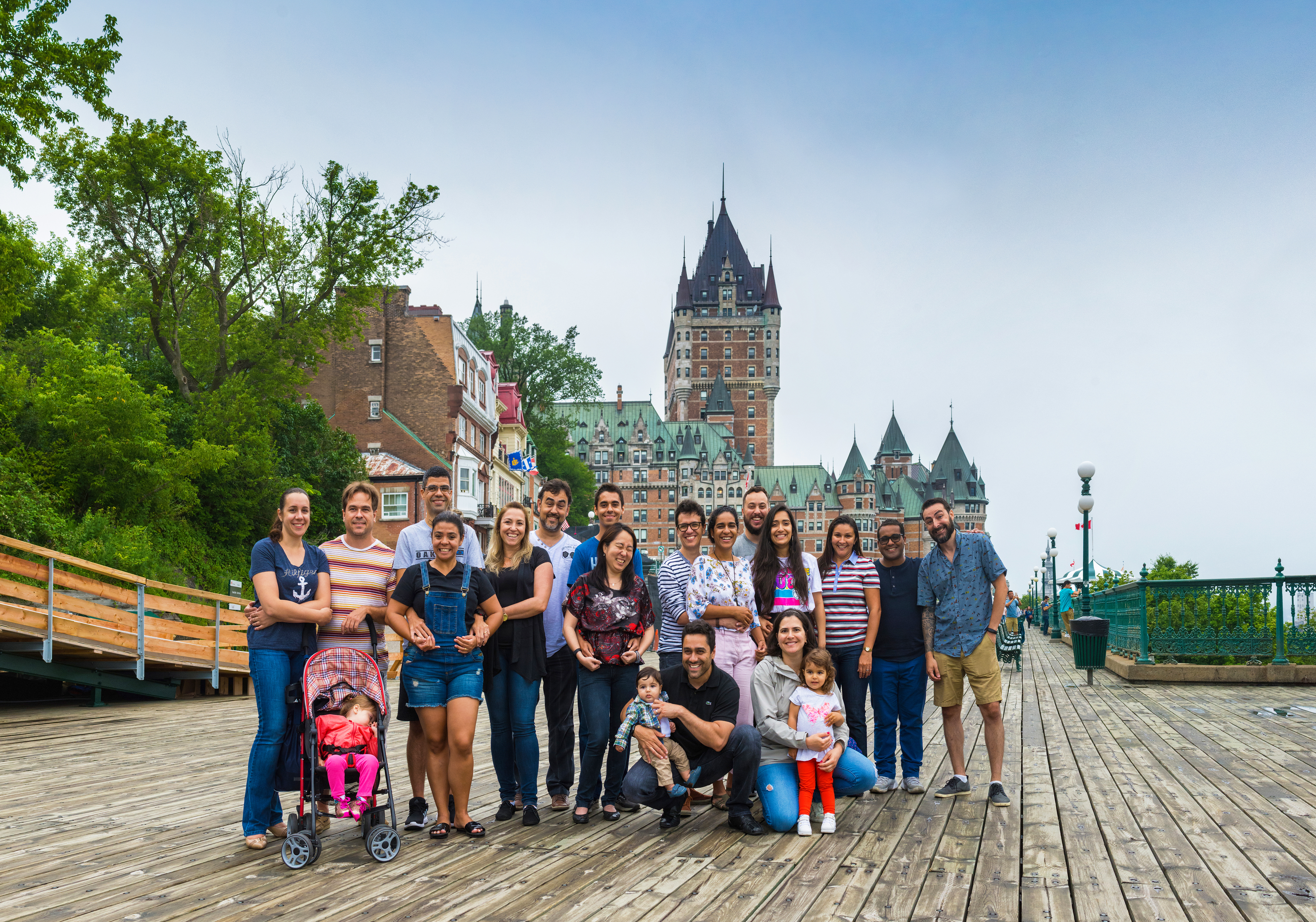
Immigrant families from Brazil, who settled in Quebec City, Canada, after being selected for their qualification for occupations requiring knowledge of French.

Over the past five years, Quebec has witnessed a noticeable rise in anti-immigrant sentiment, which has been further intensified by the actions and policies of the Coalition Avenir Québec (CAQ) government. This government has been criticized for its approach to immigration, frequently portraying it as a potential threat to Quebec's cultural identity and the French language. This stance persists despite Quebec's limited racial diversity outside Montreal and the overwhelming predominance of French as the primary language across most of the province.

The CAQ has attempted to discard 18,000 skilled worker applications without evaluating their potential contributions, and has been reluctant to increase annual immigration quotas, citing political reasons, alongside an increase in temporary workers, has adversely affected family reunification efforts and resulted in processing delays significantly longer than those in the rest of Canada. The Quebec government's opted out of a Canadian government program aimed at welcoming 11,000 people from Colombia, Haiti, and Venezuela with family ties in Canada.

== Consequences ==
=== Backlog of pending cases ===
The Quebec Ministry of Immigration has expressed understanding for the stress these delays cause to families and has attributed the responsibility to the federal government. The handling of cases after the issuance of Quebec selection certificates is the responsibility of the federal government, which admits individuals according to the goals set by Quebec. The federal government, on its part, faces its own issues with significant delays in its programs, as highlighted in the report of the Auditor General of Canada. Opposition critics argue that the government of Legault has the capacity to act to reduce the wait for thousands of families. However, with the maximum admission nearly reached, the federal government struggles to expedite applications without exceeding quotas. This has led to criticism from opposition immigration spokespersons, who suggest that delays will continue to increase and pose the risk of legal actions due to excessive delays.

=== Impact on mental health ===
The prolonged wait for family reunification has subjected numerous Iranian couples to significant psychological stress, exacerbating concerns about fertility and testing the solidity of their marriages. Caught in bureaucratic delays in processing their applications for permanent residence in Canada, these couples face the harsh reality of living apart for years, leading some to even consider divorce as a result of the strain on their relationships. The distance between loved ones during the family reunification process is linked with negative consequences on psychological well-being, causing an increase in symptoms of post-traumatic stress and depression. Moreover, those who experienced separation face more significant issues after migrating compared to individuals who did not go through a separation.

A study conducted by the Institut Universitaire Jeunes en Difficulté (IUJD), under the direction of Vanessa Lecompte, Katherine Pascuzzo, and Sonia Hélie, and published in 2023, covered the study of 146 families in Quebec that underwent reunification processes. The study highlighted how continuous disruptions in relationships can have significant psychosocial repercussions on children, both in the short and long term. The researchers pointed out that a considerable number of children show attachment issues due to the breaks or lack of stability in their primary attachment bonds, making reunification an especially sensitive stage.

The emotional impact of this forced separation is profound, with reports of individuals resorting to antidepressants to manage psychological distress. The uncertainty and wait have not only affected the mental health of those involved but also had a negative impact on their careers and financial stability, hindering their ability to concentrate and function effectively in their daily lives. The communication between couples, often reduced to video chats or text messages filled with emoticons to express their love and longing, cannot replace the intimacy and emotional support of being physically together.

The collective Québec réunifié, which groups more than 1800 families and is supported by a wide range of sympathizers, has issued an open letter addressed to Madame Christine Fréchette, Minister of Immigration, requesting her attention and action regarding the prolonged situation faced by thousands of Quebecois families in the realm of family reunification. This collective represents a diversity of citizens and permanent residents from all regions of Quebec. As of December 2023, 38,600 families were reported to be affected by the extended waiting times in the family reunification processes, where the sponsors are Canadian citizens or permanent residents. The letter highlights the alarming disparity in waiting times for family reunification in Quebec, which can reach up to 42 months, in contrast to the 10 to 12 months observed in other Canadian provinces. This delay, according to the collective, has devastating consequences on the emotional and physical well-being of the affected families, including prolonged family separation and significant deterioration of mental health. A mental health survey conducted by the collective on 408 families in the sponsorship process in Quebec, supported by Drs. Sacha Sidani and David Edward-Ooi Poon and using the INSPQ mental health index, revealed that 97% of respondents show symptoms of clinical depression and 73% exhibit anxiety.

=== Unwanted abortion ===
A situation that has highlighted tensions in Canada's immigration systems and potential allegations of discrimination centers around the experience of Laurianne Lachapelle. This Quebecois citizen has been waiting for more than a year for her husband, originally from Guatemala, to arrive in Canada through a sponsorship program. Due to prolonged waiting times, Laurianne found herself reconsidering her residency in Québec and facing extremely difficult personal decisions, including abortion.

Lachapelle married a Guatemalan in January 2022. In August of the same year, she submitted an application as part of the program to sponsor a spouse or partner living abroad. Originally, the estimated waiting time was 13 months, but a year later, this period doubled, reaching at least 24 months.

According to data provided by the Journal de Montréal in July, approximately 37,000 sponsorship applications previously approved by Québec were pending processing. This contrasts with an annual admission goal of about 10,600 people. Faced with the delay and uncertainty of her husband's arrival, and after becoming pregnant, Lachapelle made the painful decision to abort. She explained: "It was not my choice, because if my husband had the opportunity to come to Québec, our family would have started now. I could not imagine living my pregnancy alone. It's something we wanted to experience together. I think about it every day and it hurts. It was a terrible choice I had to make."

=== Risk to LGBTQ+ couples ===
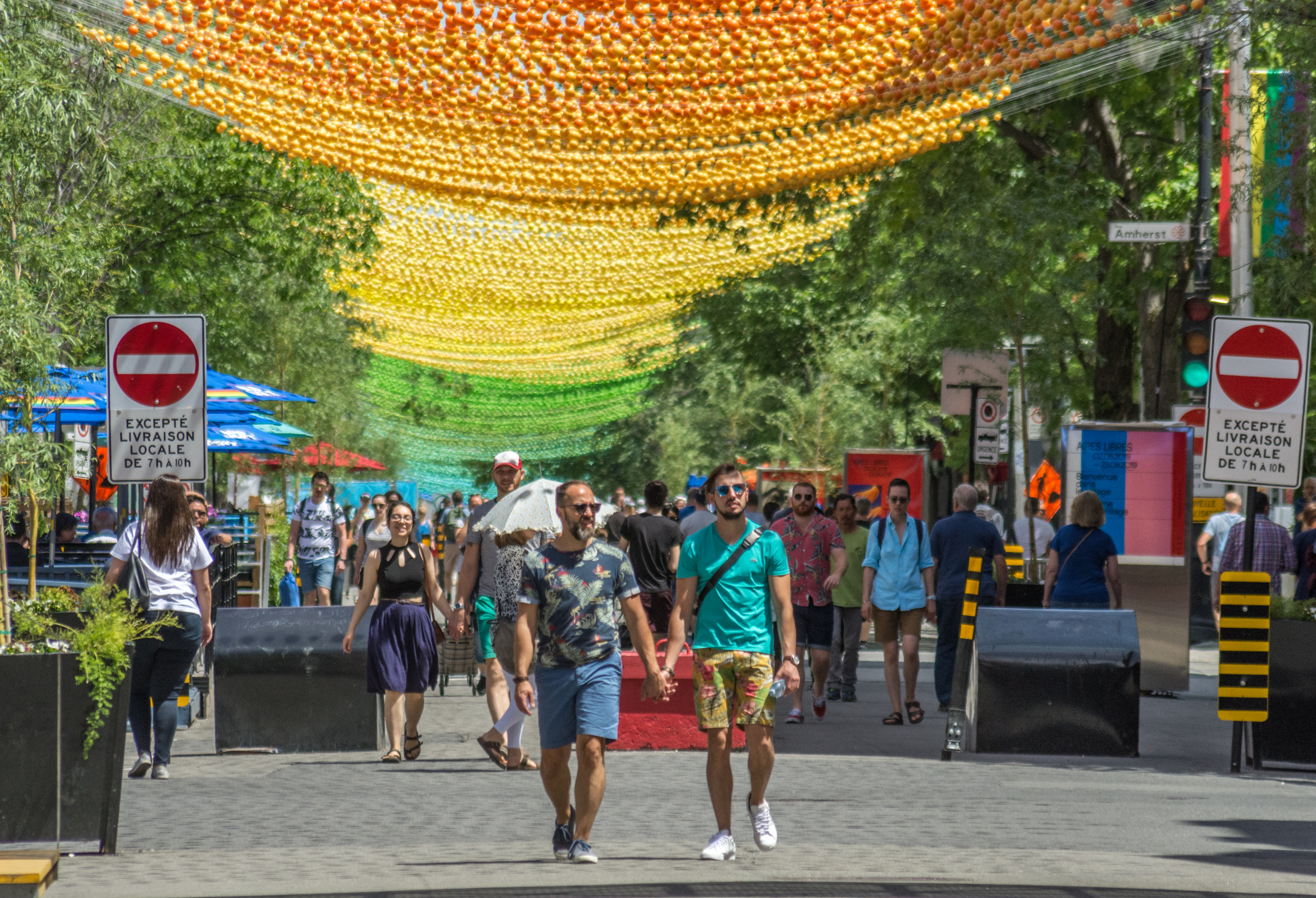
Saint Catherine Street, a haven for the LGBT community in Montreal

The complications in family reunification processes in Quebec disproportionately affect LGBTQ+ couples, exposing them to greater risks. Studies and reports have highlighted specific cases that illustrate the additional barriers and discrimination these couples face, underscoring the urgent need to adapt reunification procedures to ensure their safety and well-being. Some LGBTQ+ couples, opt to keep a low profile due to the risk their foreign partners face, who live in countries with hostile laws and attitudes towards LGBTQ+ relationships. This phenomenon has been highlighted by Québec Réunifié campaign coordinator Marie-Gervaise Pilon, who points out that these couples are "invisible victims" due to the dangers they face. An example is Aly and Sandy (fictional names), a married couple consisting of a Franco-Quebecoise citizen and her Russian spouse. They met in 2019 and married in 2021, deciding to move to Quebec to continue their studies. Both work in the health sector and have contributed to Quebec society, facing significant stress due to delays in processing their sponsorship application, complicating their ability to travel and increasing their uncertainty about the future.

Another case is that of Xavier (fictitious name), who is in a relationship with Frank (fictitious name), a resident of Morocco, where consensual sexual activities between same-sex individuals are prohibited and criminalized. The prolonged separation and associated anxiety have deeply affected Xavier's emotional well-being, leading him to consider the possibility of moving to another province to expedite the reunification process.

Immigration lawyer Maxime Lapointe has filed a lawsuit against the Quebec government for excessive delays in processing the family reunification applications of LGBTQ+ couples, arguing that the Canada-Quebec Accord on Immigration does not allow Quebec to impose a quota in this category, which is under federal jurisdiction, and criticizing the government for playing with people's lives. Additionally, the experience of Jean-Sébastien Gervais and his husband Paolo, who lives in the Philippines, is recounted. Despite legal barriers and logistical challenges, the couple married in Costa Rica and now await the processing of their permanent residency application, while Gervais works remotely to be with his spouse.

=== Compromised safety for applicants in conflict zones ===
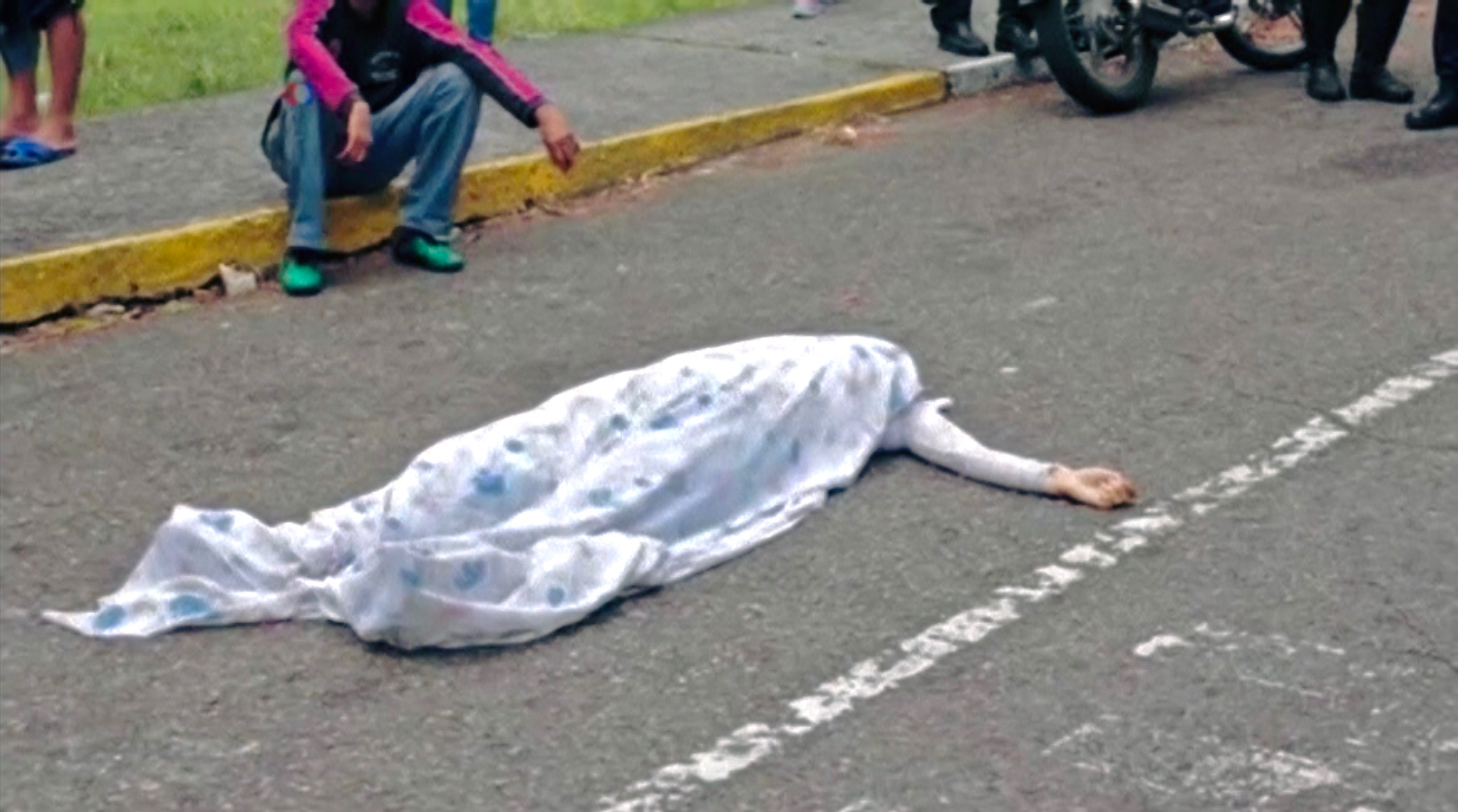
The body of Paola Ramírez after being killed during the 2017 protests in Venezuela.

Applicants from countries in conflict or dangerous situations face significant challenges in the family reunification process in Quebec. The story of individuals like Joanne Alexandre in Haiti highlights the critical intersection between forced migration and reunification policies, evidencing a clear risk to the safety and life of applicants under these extreme conditions. Applicants, both those in Canada and their family members abroad, must undergo medical exams whose results are valid for one year. If there are additional delays in processing, these exams may expire and need to be redone, adding further delays to the process. This situation is evidenced in the case of Subha, who had to wait more than five years to reunite with her husband, during which he had to undergo the medical exam on three occasions. Another critical aspect in processing permanent residency is the need to establish the family relationship between the family member in Canada and their relatives abroad. Sometimes, family members cannot provide the birth and marriage certificates that CIC wishes to see due to document destruction during armed conflicts or the refusal of persecuting authorities to issue such documents. While CIC needs to verify the family relationship, there are other types of evidence that can be used when documents are missing or considered unsatisfactory.

In some cases, Citizenship and Immigration Canada (CIC) requests DNA tests to establish the family relationship, even though its official policy is to resort to these tests only as a last resort. DNA testing represents a costly, time-consuming, and intrusive process, the cost of which must be borne by the family, representing a significant obstacle for those who have recently arrived in Canada and are possibly sending money to their family members abroad to help them survive.

=== Internal migration due to frustrations in the process ===
Dissatisfaction with the family reunification process has led to an increasing number of residents in Quebec considering the possibility of moving to other provinces or territories in Canada. Testimonies like that of Amandine, published in media outlets such as Le Devoir, and reports documenting cases of public servants in this situation, demonstrate the socioeconomic and personal consequences of deficiencies in the reunification process. This problem is compounded by Lachapelle's statement, which suggests that the real threat to the French language in Quebec is not immigration itself, but the potential emigration of Quebecers due to the rigidity of immigration policies.

The testimony of Amandine, a Frenchwoman whose last name is kept anonymous for fear of jeopardizing her immigration process, goes through a similar situation. Despite having actively contributed to Quebec society, Amandine and her Canadian partner face long waits and the uncertainty of not being able to travel freely, which has led them to consider the possibility of moving to another Canadian province to escape these restrictions. Quebec's policy, which imposes a slower admission process compared to other regions of Canada, has caused many like Amandine to contemplate leaving the province in search of a more favorable solution to their circumstances.

=== Prolonged family separation ===
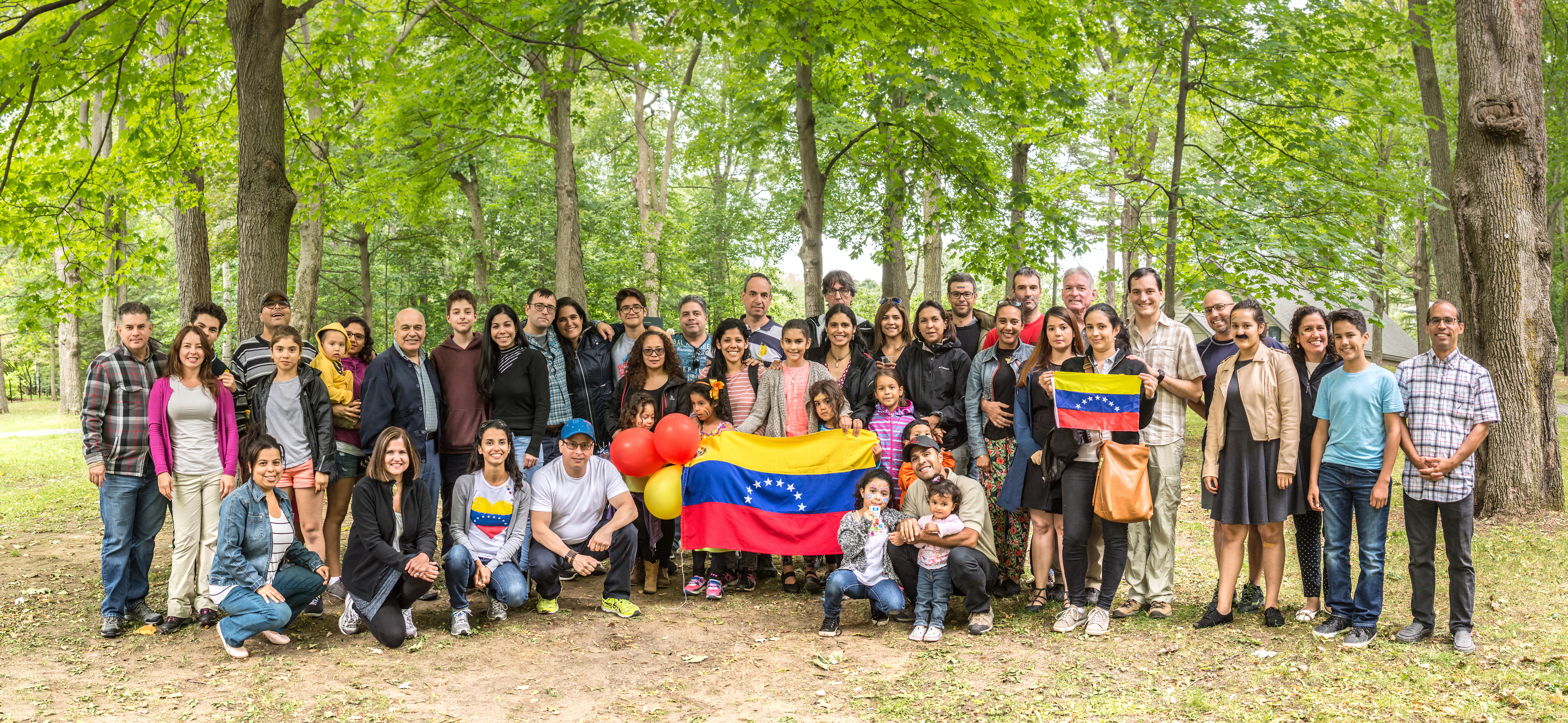
Venezuelan immigrant families in Quebec City, some waiting for reunification

Delays and obstacles in the family reunification process in Quebec result in prolonged periods of separation between children and their parents. This situation, highlighted in testimonies to media outlets such as La Presse, underscores the emotional and developmental repercussions for the affected children, highlighting the importance of streamlining reunification processes to mitigate these negative impacts.

Shirin, an immigrant from Afghanistan in April 1998, applied for permanent residence for herself, her husband, and her five children, experiencing a prolonged wait of more than six years for family reunification due to her husband's inadmissibility and the subsequent request for DNA tests by CIC, which questioned her maternity. Despite complying with this costly and emotionally burdensome request, Shirin continued to face obstacles in reunification with her children. This situation demonstrates the additional financial problems and emotional stress faced by refugees in similar processes, like Mana, who escaped from her home country in Central Africa and had to overcome significant financial and bureaucratic barriers to reunite with her children after more than four years of separation. The delays and confusing or unnecessary requests by CIC, along with long waiting times for security verifications and the difficulty in obtaining clear information about the status of applications, further complicate these processes, exacerbating the emotional and psychological suffering of the family members.

These prolonged separations are not only a bureaucratic problem but also have profound emotional and security implications for the family members left behind, often in risk situations. The story of Mindondo and the tragic loss of his son in the Democratic Republic of the Congo show the potentially fatal consequences of delays in family reunification. Similarly, the experience of Shambuyi, whose son died while waiting for family reunification, highlights the critical need to process these applications more efficiently and with greater sensitivity towards individual circumstances. The situation of Joane Alexandre, caught in a long family reunification process with her husband Ralph Alcide and her son Marveen in Quebec, showcases the reality of thousands of families affected by extensive delays in immigration procedures in Canada. With more than 18 months immersed in this process, Alexandre has not seen her 6-year-old son in two years, underlining the profound emotional and psychological consequences of such delays, which have been exacerbated up to 42 months of waiting. This scenario is worsened by Quebec's establishment of a quantitative limit for family reunification in 2023, approximately 10,600 people, creating what has been described as an "artificial backlog." Unlike Quebec, the rest of Canada experiences significantly shorter waiting times, around 12 months.

=== The case of Alexandre and Alcide ===
The case of Alexandre and Alcide is just one example among many, showing the desperation and uncertainty that families face amid increasingly tense security issues in Haiti. The insecurity situation has reached such a point that the risk of kidnapping has prevented their son from visiting his mother. Additionally, the family reunification process is complicated by the criteria for issuing visitor visas, which have resulted in repeated rejections for Alexandre due to her strong ties to Canada. This regulatory framework and significant delays have generated criticism of the government policies of Quebec and the Canadian federal government. Experts, like immigration lawyer Maxime Lapointe, have pointed out the need for greater transparency and efficiency in handling these cases. Despite promises to facilitate visa applications for family reunification, many families continue to face denials, contributing to an already distressing situation.

=== Non-compliance with international obligations ===
Internationally, the concept of protecting family unity is inferred from international human rights instruments, such as the Universal Declaration of Human Rights of 1948, which states that the family is the natural and fundamental unit of society and is entitled to protection by society and the State. Furthermore, the International Covenant on Economic, Social and Cultural Rights of 1966 underscores that the family should be given the widest possible protection and assistance. Canadian legislation introduced the term "family reunification" in 1976, and although the concept of family reunion as a method of immigration has existed since 1908, the Immigration Act of 1976 articulated this concept as a measure to facilitate the reunion in Canada of Canadian citizens and permanent residents with close relatives from abroad. The Immigration and Refugee Protection Act of 2002 has a similar goal in its text: "to ensure that families are reunited in Canada."

The idea that family class immigration is based on humanitarian considerations is demystified, clarifying that it actually rests on the importance of family reunification based on familial relationships. In Canada's family reunification policy, two main themes emerge: the tension between immigration purely based on familial relationship and immigration for other reasons, and the debate over how to define "family."

The issues surrounding family reunification processes in Quebec have implications not only at a national level but also raise concerns regarding Canada's compliance with international conventions, particularly the Convention on the Rights of the Child. This non-compliance highlights deficiencies in Quebec's migration policies and the need for reforms that align these practices with international human rights standards and child protection.

The issue of forced family separation in Quebec, particularly within the context of prolonged family reunification processes, touches on fundamental aspects of international law, especially those concerning international treaties on human rights. The Convention on the Rights of the Child (CRC), adopted by the United Nations General Assembly in 1989 and ratified by Canada in 1991, states in its Article 9 that States Parties shall ensure that a child shall not be separated from his or her parents against their will, except when competent authorities subject to legal procedure and international standards determine that such separation is necessary for the best interests of the child. Additionally, Article 10 emphasizes the rights of children and their parents to leave any country, including their own, and to enter their own country for the purpose of family reunification.

In this context, the prolongation of family reunification processes in Quebec and the province's migration policies must be analyzed in light of these international commitments. Involuntary and prolonged family separation contravenes the fundamental principles of the CRC, especially regarding protection against separation from parents without due legal process and the right to family reunification. This aspect is crucial, as family separation not only disrupts the relationship between parents and children but also exposes those affected to greater risks of exploitation, abuse, and neglect, leading to adverse psychosocial consequences both in the short and long term. Another relevant treaty is the Convention on the Protection of the Rights of All Migrant Workers and Members of Their Families (1990), which, although not ratified by Canada, sets international standards on the protection of the rights of migrant workers and the importance of family reunification. This instrument underscores the need to take appropriate measures to ensure the protection of the right of migrant workers and their relatives to live together.

=== Workforce loss ===
A report prepared by Nathalie Coursin for Québec Réunifié reveals the sponsored individuals' desire to fully integrate into Quebec society, demonstrated by their willingness to learn French and by the diversity of their professional profiles. These characteristics not only advocate for their ability to adapt and integrate but also suggest an untapped potential that could benefit Québec's economy and social fabric. Moreover, it is observed that most sponsors have adequate housing for their relatives, underscoring the existence of a support infrastructure to facilitate this transition. However, the considerable number of applicants contemplating moving to other Canadian provinces, where processes are more agile, reflects a growth and enrichment opportunity that Québec could be missing.

The study not only addresses the operational and bureaucratic problems of family reunification but also offers a window into the diversity and richness that applicants are ready to bring to Québec. Thus, it suggests a reflection on the need to streamline and optimize immigration processes to not only prevent the loss of valuable individuals and families but also to enhance the socioeconomic development of the province. This approach proposes a forward-looking perspective, considering how Québec can fully leverage the potential of those seeking to make this province their home, thereby strengthening its dynamism and cultural diversity.

== Government Response ==
=== Proposed Solutions ===
Me Lapointe has requested Ottawa to finalize all family reunification cases destined for Quebec that exceed the 12-month period currently in effect in the rest of the country, within the next 60 days. Additionally, he urges the Quebec government to completely clear the backlogs of family reunification and to abolish its target of 10,400 admissions per year in this category. Should Minister Christine Fréchette fail to comply, Me Lapointe suggests another solution: create a dynamic admission target that adjusts according to supply and demand, to always respect the average processing time of 12 months. Me Lapointe orders both levels of government to reopen the Canada-Québec Agreement to renegotiate each party's roles and responsibilities. If the two governments do not act within the allotted 60 days, Me Lapointe intends to file a request for a declaratory judgment before the Superior Court.

=== Government Actions and Reactions ===
Christine Fréchette, Minister of Immigration, Francization, and Integration, responded to concerns about immigration delays by highlighting that a parliamentary commission on the subject was underway. However, she avoided referring to individual cases and emphasized the importance of overall data. The government's response was perceived by Lachapelle as lacking in humanity, suggesting a possible detachment of the government from the real issues faced by people. Before a cabinet meeting, Minister Fréchette chose not to comment on this situation to reporters. Monsef Derraji, spokesperson for the Quebec Liberal Party on immigration, and Guillaume Cliche-Rivard, spokesperson for Québec solidaire on the same issue, have also expressed their concern about the current situation and the need for a solution.

=== Legal Action Against the Government of Quebec for Discrimination in Immigration ===
In March 2024, a lawsuit was filed against the government of Quebec, led by Premier François Legault, over the management of immigration applications in the realm of family reunification. The legal action, spearheaded by immigration lawyer Maxime Lapointe, focused on Christine Fréchette, the Quebec Minister of Immigration, who was formally notified in December 2023 to resolve the prolonged delays in processing such applications. The lawsuit argues that the province of Quebec has intentionally created obstacles and discredited the family reunification program, resulting in an average delay of 34 months for these applications, compared to 12 months in the rest of Canada. The litigation seeks to have the Superior Court declare inapplicable, invalid, or inoperative Legault's immigration plan and compel Minister Fréchette to adjust the admission thresholds to expedite family reunification procedures in Quebec. Discrimination based on national origin is alleged, disadvantaging Quebecers compared to families destined for other Canadian provinces. This case is exemplified by the situation of Kaba Keita, a Guinean threatened with deportation, whose family reunification process would have concluded in another province. Despite the pressure, the federal government, represented by Immigration Minister Marc Miller, has not been sued, given its apparent willingness to resolve the matter, unlike the provincial government that insists on maintaining a limit on admissions.

Minister Fréchette defended Quebec's stance, claiming a balanced approach to immigration, attempting to reconcile humanitarian commitments, family reunification, and economic immigration, despite criticisms and significant delays in processing applications. The situation underscores the tensions between government levels in Canada regarding immigration policy and the treatment of families seeking to reunite in Quebec.

== Criticisms ==
"On average, Australia manages to process its applications, all immigration categories included, within 3 to 6 months. We do it in 3 to 6 years. Find the error!".

— Jason Kenney

=== Voices of Opposition ===
Monsef Derraji, spokesperson for the Quebec Liberal Party on immigration matters, describes the situation as inhumane, highlighting the emotional difficulty of separated families and questioning the provincial government's insistence. Likewise, members of groups like Québec réunifié emphasize the importance for the population to understand that family reunification could affect anyone in the future. Experts suggest that the Quebec government could modify the percentages of its immigration thresholds, decreasing the proportion of economic immigrants and increasing that of family reunification, a category considered to have been overlooked in the immigration plan but essential to society. André A. Morin, a well-known Liberal critic on immigration issues, has urged for increased communication between the two levels of government. He underscored the urgent need for the Coalition Avenir Québec (CAQ) government to adopt a solution-oriented approach and engage in effective dialogue with the federal government in Ottawa, highlighting the impossibility of the latter acting alone on immigration matters. Morin expressed these views through a written statement, emphasizing the importance of intergovernmental collaboration to effectively address immigration issues.

=== Support and Requests from Organizations ===
The group Québec réunifié urges the government to reconsider the current admission limits in family reunification, arguing that these should not prevail, similar to other Canadian provinces, and underlines the importance of aligning waiting times with the Canadian standard of 12 months to facilitate the integration of family members into Québec society. Furthermore, the letter highlights the fundamental role of the family in society and the economy, arguing that investing in family welfare is investing in the vitality and resilience of society. The letter is supported by a wide range of organizations and personalities, including parliamentary support from André Albert Morin Ad. E and Guillaume Cliche-Rivard, municipal support such as the Ville de Prévost, union support from the CSN, FTQ, and FIQ, as well as various organizations, chambers of commerce, law firms, immigration consultants, private companies, citizen groups, and members of the Barreau du Québec. This collective expresses the voice of thousands of people affected by current immigration policies and calls for an urgent review to alleviate the suffering of separated families.

Organizations and groups like Québec Réunifié have raised their voices, sending open letters to government authorities, imploring actions to mitigate these unacceptable delays. Despite calls for action, there has been little evidence of an effective governmental response to address this crisis. Additionally, financial responsibility is imposed on sponsors, who must bear the living costs of the sponsored for periods of up to 10 years.

== See also ==
- Politics of Canada
- Right of asylum
