= François Legault =

Premier of Quebec from 2018 to 2026

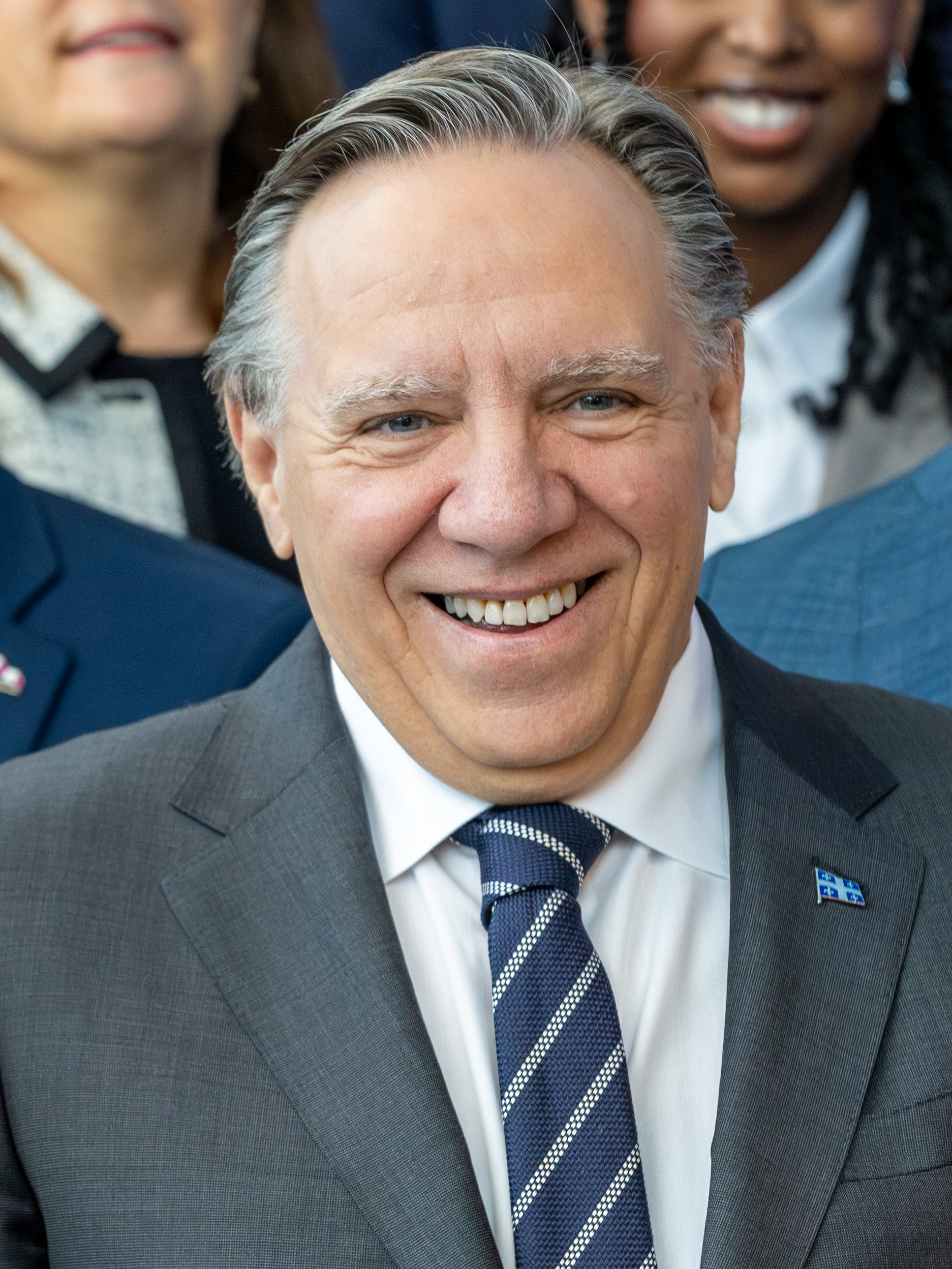
- Legault in 2025

32nd Premier of Quebec
- In office October 18, 2018 – April 15, 2026
- Monarchs: Elizabeth II; Charles III
- Lieutenant Governor: J. Michel Doyon; Manon Jeannotte
- Deputy: Geneviève Guilbault (2018–2025)
- Preceded by: Philippe Couillard
- Succeeded by: Christine Fréchette

Leader of the Coalition Avenir Québec
- In office November 4, 2011 – April 12, 2026
- President: Dominique Anglade; Maud Cohen; Stéphane Le Bouyonnec; Sarah Beaumier
- Preceded by: Position established
- Succeeded by: Christine Fréchette
Quebec Executive Council
Minister of Health and Social Services
In office January 30, 2002 – April 29, 2003
| Premier | Bernard Landry |
| Preceded by | Rémy Trudel |
| Succeeded by | Philippe Couillard |
Minister of Education
In office December 15, 1998 – January 30, 2002
| Premier | Lucien Bouchard; Bernard Landry |
| Preceded by | Pauline Marois |
| Succeeded by | Sylvain Simard |
Parliamentary constituencies
Member of the National Assembly
In office September 4, 2012 – August 27, 2026
| Preceded by | Scott McKay |
| Succeeded by | Maxime Laporte |
| Constituency | L'Assomption |
In office November 30, 1998 – June 25, 2009
| Preceded by | Lévis Brien |
| Succeeded by | Nicolas Marceau |
| Constituency | Rousseau |

Personal details
- Born: May 26, 1957 (age 69) Lachine, Quebec, Canada
- Party: Coalition Avenir Québec (since 2011)
- Other political affiliations: Parti Québécois (1998–2009)
- Spouse: Isabelle Brais (m. 1992)
- Children: 2
- Education: HEC Montréal (BBA, MBA)
- Occupation: Accountant; executive; politician
- Cabinet: Legault ministry

François Legault (French: [fʁɑ̃swa ləɡo]; born May 26, 1957) is a Canadian politician and businessman who served as the 32nd premier of Quebec from 2018 to 2026. A founding member of the Coalition Avenir Québec (CAQ), he led the party from its inception in 2011 until his resignation in 2026. Legault sat as a member of the National Assembly (MNA) from 2012 to 2026, and previously from 1998 to 2009.

Prior to entering politics, he was the co-founder of the Canadian airline Air Transat. He was a MNA from 1998 to 2009—serving in the governments of former premiers Lucien Bouchard and Bernard Landry—as the minister of education from 1998 to 2003 and as the minister of health from 2002 to 2003. He was a member of the Parti Québécois (PQ), first elected in the 1998 provincial election in the riding of Rousseau. He was re-elected in 2003, 2007, and 2008 but resigned his seat on June 25, 2009. He returned to the National Assembly following his victory in the 2012 provincial election as the MNA for L'Assomption, a suburb of Montreal. He was reelected in 2014.

Legault led the CAQ to majority governments in the 2018 and 2022 provincial elections; the first government not of the Quebec Liberal Party or the Parti Québécois (PQ) since Jean-Jacques Bertrand's 1970 Union Nationale government. During his premiership, Legault responded to the COVID-19 pandemic, passed legislation promoting the French language, Quebec Secularism and Quebec identity (including amendments to the Charter of the French Language), and pursued increased autonomy from the federal government. Amid poor opinion polling, Legault announced his pending resignation on January 14, 2026, ahead of the 2026 election.

== Early life and education ==
François Legault was born on May 26, 1957, at the Lachine Hospital and grew up in Sainte-Anne-de-Bellevue, Quebec. His father, Lucien Legault, was a postmaster. His mother, Pauline Schetagne, was a housewife who also worked as a cashier at the local A&P grocery store.

Legault has a bachelor's and master's degree in business administration from HEC Montréal. He is also a member of the Canadian Institute of Chartered Accountants.

== Business career ==
Legault worked as an administrator for Provigo and an auditor for Ernst & Young until 1984. In 1985, Legault became the director of finance and administration at Nationair Canada and then marketing director at Quebecair. He then co-founded Air Transat in 1986, and was until 1997 its chief executive officer. The airline quickly became one of the largest airline companies in Canada offering charter flights. From 1995 to 1998, Legault sat on the boards of various companies, including Provigo Inc., Culinar, Sico, Technilab Inc. and Bestar Inc., and the Marc-Aurèle Fortin private museum.

== Early political career ==
=== Parti Québécois ===
Legault was recruited to politics by Lucien Bouchard, and was elected to the National Assembly at the 1998 election for the off-island suburban riding of Rousseau. He was immediately promoted to cabinet as minister for industry and commerce. He was later named the minister of education.

When Bouchard resigned, Legault supported Bernard Landry.

Landry appointed Legault as minister of education and later as minister of health and social services. He was re-elected in 2003 while the PQ lost to the Quebec Liberal Party. He remained on the PQ front bench as the critic for economics, economic development, and finances.

Legault endorsed Richard Legendre in the 2005 PQ leadership election, which was won by André Boisclair. After his re-election in 2007, Legault was renamed the PQ critic for economic development and finances.

Legault was re-elected in the 2008 election but announced on June 25, 2009, that he would retire from politics. He was seen by some political analysts at the time as a potential contender in a future leadership election. However, some Liberals thought that he could replace Jean Charest, then premier.

=== Leader of the Coalition Avenir Québec ===
In February 2011, Legault co-founded with Charles Sirois a new political movement called the "Coalition pour l'avenir du Québec" ("Coalition for the Future of Quebec"). In November 2011 it became an official party under the name Coalition Avenir Québec (CAQ). The CAQ aims to bring together like-minded voters in a single party regardless of their views on Quebec nationalism, Quebec federalism and Quebec autonomism. In a break with his sovereigntist past, Legault promised that a CAQ government would never hold a referendum on sovereignty. Soon after retiring from politics, he became disenchanted with sovereigntism and resigned from the PQ. He eventually came to believe that the decades-long debate over sovereignty had hindered Quebec's economic progress, and founded the CAQ as a party focused on developing the economy first. While he now believed Quebec belongs within Canada, he vowed that a CAQ government would "explore all options" to defend Quebec's interests and demand greater power.

The party finished third in the 2012 general election, winning 19 seats and 27.05 percent of the vote. At that election, Legault returned to the National Assembly as the member for the off-island suburban riding of L'Assomption.

In the 2014 general election, the CAQ finished third again, but increased their seat count to 22.

==== 2018 election ====
In late 2017, the CAQ began leading in most opinion polling, with the party holding a small lead during the campaign period. During the campaign, he stated that he would run a "government of accountants". In the 2018 general election on October 1, Legault led the CAQ to an unexpected gain of 53 seats for a total of 74, vaulting the CAQ from third place to a majority of 11 and making Legault the premier of Quebec.

== Premier of Quebec (2018–2026) ==
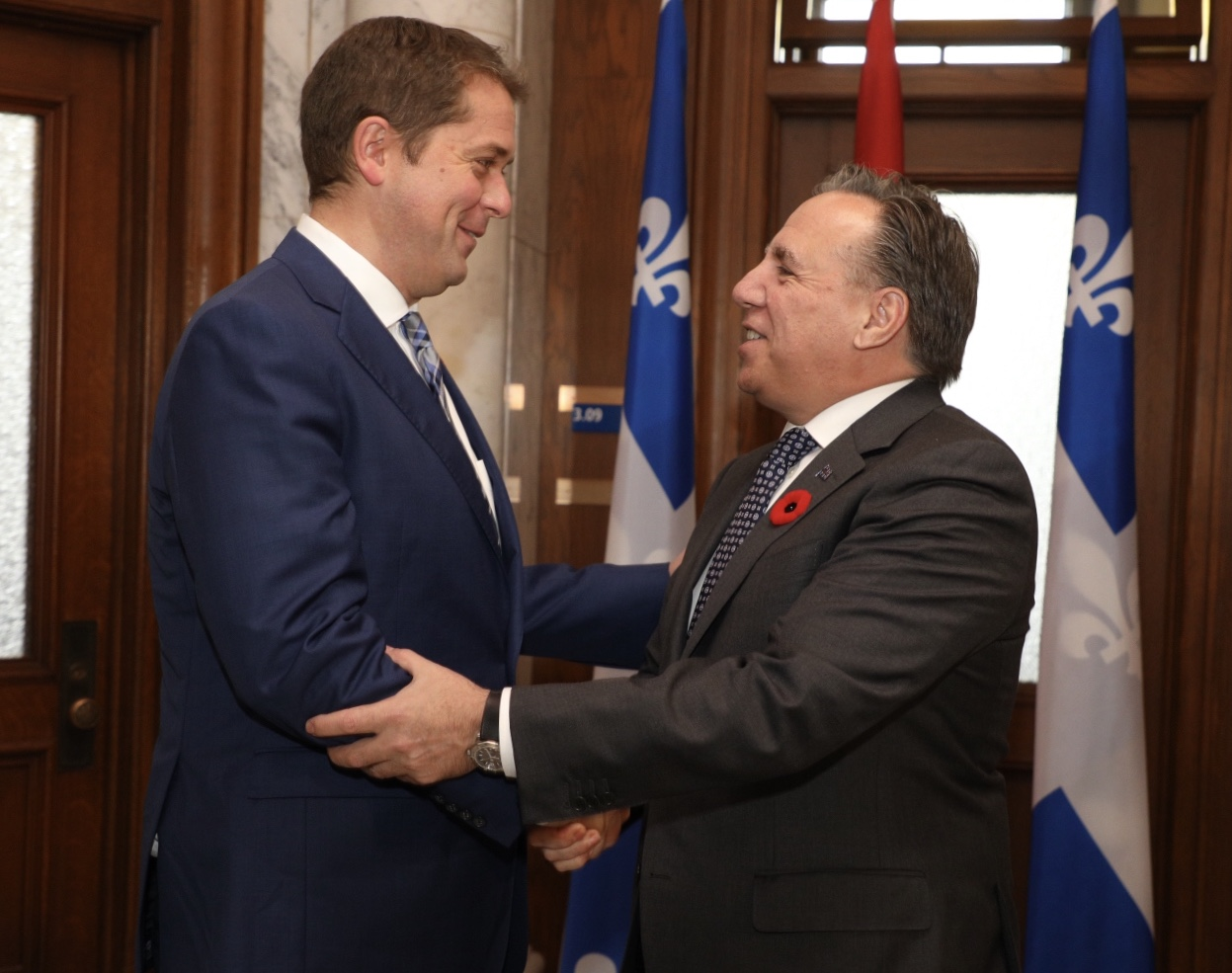
Andrew Scheer with Legault in 2018

On October 18, 2018, Legault was sworn in as Premier of Quebec, marking the end of nearly 50 years of Liberal and Parti Québécois rule in the province.

=== Social issues ===
Legault apologized to First Nations and Inuit in October 2019 for discrimination they suffered in dealing with the state, noting the Government of Quebec had failed in its duty to them. He acknowledged that apologies are but a first step, and more work needs to be done to break down barriers and rectify long-standing problems.

In May 2024, Legault criticized pro-Palestinian protests on university campuses, saying police should dismantle an "illegal" pro-Palestinian encampment at Montreal’s McGill University.

In October 2025, his government tabled Bill 1, which proposes a draft constitution for the province. It modifies many provincial laws, including the Quebec Charter of Human Rights and Freedoms.

In 2026, the Musée national de l’histoire du Québec will open, focusing on the history of the "French-speaking Québécois nation".

==== Secularism ====
Having run on the platform during the 2018 election, on March 28, 2019, the Quebec government tabled its long-awaited secularism bill. Bill 21, entitled "An Act respecting the laicity of the State", if made law, would ban public workers in positions of authority from wearing religious symbols. This would include any public employee who carries a weapon, including police officers, courthouse constables, bodyguards, prison guards and wildlife officers, as well as Crown prosecutors, government lawyers and judges, school principals, vice-principals and teachers. The bill invoked notwithstanding clause of the Canadian Charter of Rights and Freedoms to prevent it from being overturned by the courts.

The bill passed on June 17 by a 73–35 vote, with backing of the Parti Québécois while the Liberals and Quebec Solidaire were opposed. The Coalition Avenir Quebec government also introduced a last-minute amendment toughening the law, making provisions for a minister to verify that it is being obeyed and to demand corrective measures if necessary.

Legault said the bill was moderate and that by having a law like this, it would prevent a party like France's Marine Le Pen National Rally in Quebec.

On May 2, 2024, The bill was renewed by using the notwithstanding clause for five more years until 2029.

In 2026, the government passed legislation that banned street prayers and prayer rooms in universities and CEGEPs.

Despite his support of secularism, Legault has made numerous pro-Catholic statements throughout his premiership, leading some pro-secularist politician in Quebec to accuse him of having double standards in regards to his policies on secularism. In 2019, during a conversation with California governor Gavin Newsom, Legault declared that "All French Canadians are Catholic". Despite opposition member of Québec Solidaire Gabriel Nadeau-Dubois calling Legault's statement "embarrassing", Legault doubled down and defended his prior statement about all French-Canadians being Catholics, stating that he was talking about "the shared origins of Irish and French Catholics." In 2023 on Easter Monday, Legault made a quote Tweet on Twitter in response to a column in the Journal de Montréal titled "Praise of our old Catholic background" where he said, "Catholicism has also engendered in us a culture of solidarity that distinguishes us on a continental scale." This led several Twitter users and politicians to criticize Legault's post. He later made a follow up post stating, "It is necessary to distinguish between secularism and our heritage." Premier officer employee Martin Plante defended Legault stating, "Secularism in no way implies an obligation to deny our heritage nor a duty to erase our religious heritage. We can be proud of it, while defending the secularism of the state." Despite calls for Legault to delete his post, he did not.

==== Language ====
In May 2022, The CAQ government of Legault passed Bill 96, with 78 MNAs in favour (from the CAQ and Québec solidaire) and 29 against (from the Liberal Party and Parti Québécois). The bill strengthens the 1970s Charter of the French Language bill.

In that same year Legault caused some controversy when he stated that Quebec risked losing French as an official language if Quebec did not have more control over immigration policy. He compared it to the U.S. state of Louisiana which once spoke French as a majority.

=== Immigration ===
In Quebec, the leader of the CAQ, François Legault, controversially linked immigration to "violence" and "extremism." He also expressed concern about the threat that immigration of non-French speakers poses to the province's "national cohesion." Despite Legault's apologies for his comments, the immigration debate has been described as superficial, focusing on numbers and ambiguous concepts such as the province's capacity for integration. Experts and academics offer varied opinions on the matter. Pierre Fortin, Professor Emeritus of Economics at UQAM, describes the figure proposed by Blackburn as "unreasonable," warning that it could lead to administrative chaos and encourage xenophobic and racist attitudes toward immigrants. On the other hand, Mireille Paquet, Professor of Political Science at Concordia University, questions this theory, indicating that research does not provide definitive answers and that negative reactions against immigrants are more due to feelings of insecurity among the non-immigrant population, feelings that can be exacerbated by public policies such as cuts to social services.

Various human rights and immigrant support organizations have expressed alarm over statements made by members of the Coalition Avenir Québec government, accusing them of contributing to a climate of anxiety by attributing the public services crisis to immigrants. This situation has been compared by some critics to an "extremely concerning trend of xenophobic populism" observed in Europe and other parts of the world. France-Isabelle Langlois, director of Amnesty International Canada, expressed her outrage, particularly in response to comments made by the Minister of the French Language, Jean-François Roberge, who stated that the "Québécois identity" is threatened by immigrants, which was interpreted as hate speech and xenophobic rhetoric.

Under Legault's CAQ government, he has decreased immigration numbers to 40,000 in 2019, and in 2019 also introduced a values test for immigrants. The most critical aspect of this situation is the limited number of annual admissions set by François Legault's government, approximately 10,400, despite an inventory of nearly 40,000 pending cases. This limitation creates a significant bottleneck, resulting in a backlog of cases and great distress among the affected couples. According to Me Lapointe, the provincial government, under the Canada-Quebec Agreement specifying the role of each level of government in immigration, does not have the authority to impose a quota in the family reunification category. However, by processing only the number of cases desired by the Legault government, Ottawa would also be violating the terms of this agreement.

In 2019, during a European trip to France, Legault said he wanted more French and other European immigrants to come to Quebec with the overall immigration numbers cut.

In August 2019, Legault told businesses who called for an increase in immigration that they needed to boost wages if they wanted to find workers.

In December 2019, during a meeting with Governor of California Gavin Newsom, Legault declared that all French-Canadians are Catholic.

Legault asked the federal government to close the Roxham Road crossing in May 2022, saying Quebec's public and private social resources to take care of them were being stressed. Advocates for refugees disputed that. "The refugee organizations in Montreal have said very clearly that they do have capacity," said Wendy Ayotte, one of the founders of Bridges Not Borders, a local organization that assists asylum seekers at Roxham, who lives near the crossing. She and other advocates warned that if Roxham were to be closed, smuggling and its attendant risks to asylum seekers would increase.

In June 2022, Legault stated he was against multiculturalism, in favor of supporting interculturalism and integration, which would include immigrants assimilating into Quebec and learning French.

In 2022, Legault raised the idea of having referendum on getting more immigration powers from federal government. In 2024, Legault repeated his calls on Quebec might hold a referendum on immigration powers if Prime Minister Justin Trudeau did not give the province more immigration powers.

Legault is opposed to a plan by Century Initiative lobby group which wants to increase immigration in Canada, saying that "it constitutes a threat to Quebec".

=== COVID-19 pandemic ===
During the 2020 COVID-19 outbreak, Legault organized daily press conferences with Director of Public Health Horacio Arruda and Minister of Health Danielle McCann, starting March 12, to encourage the population to stay home and keep hygiene measures that would help suppress the spread of the virus. In May, Canada's chief science adviser, Mona Nemer, criticized Quebec for its lack of testing and tracing strategy. However, his government saw high approval ratings during the pandemic. His government's handling of long-term care homes during the pandemic was criticized in a report by the province's ombudswoman.

=== Environment ===
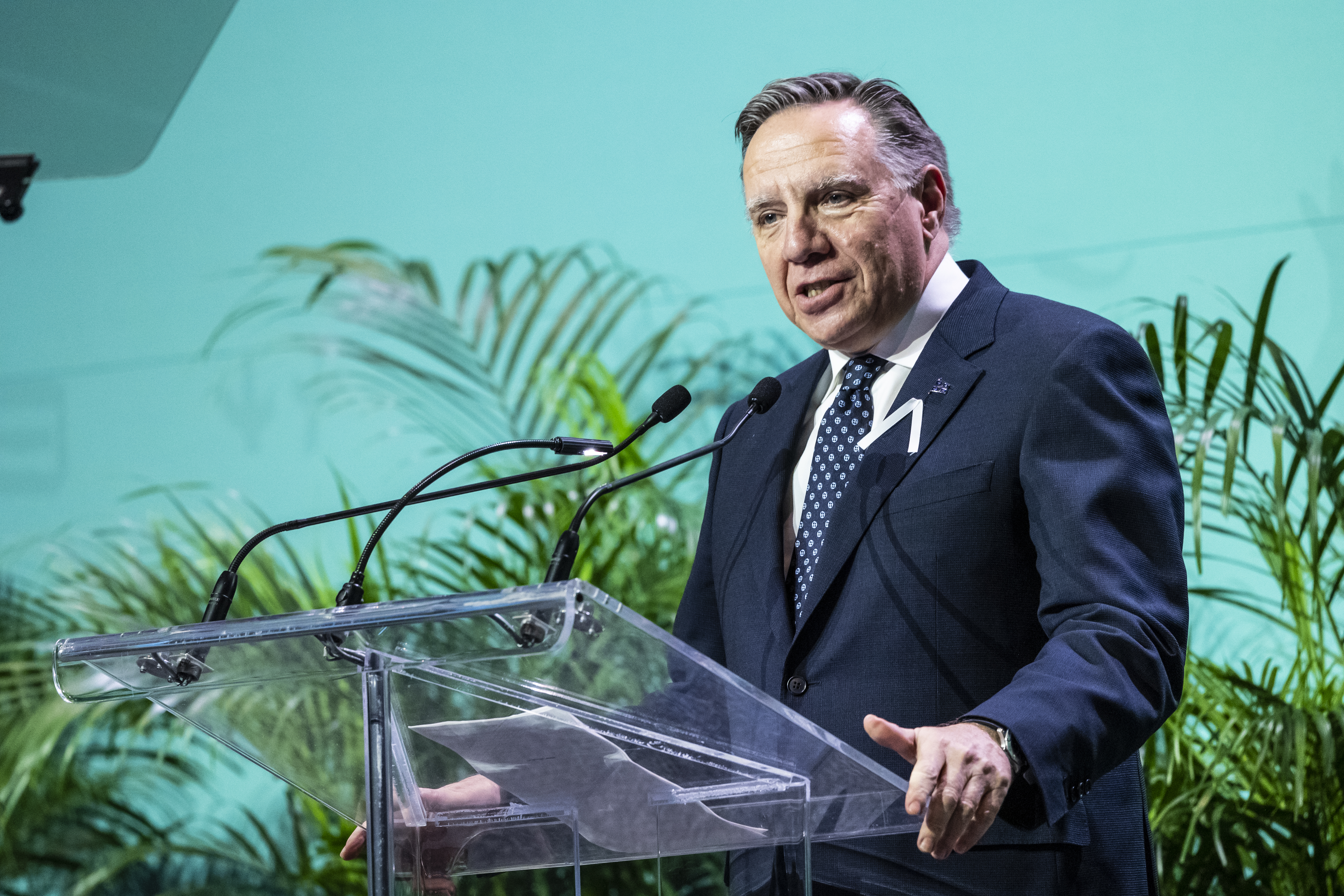
Legault during the opening ceremony of the COP15 in Montreal (2022)

In November 2020, Legault announced the government's plan to tackle climate change, which would involve a ban on the sale of new gas-powered vehicles from 2035 (commercial vehicles and second-hand cars would be exempt). Some experts have said that rather than focusing on electric vehicles, more funds should be committed to public transit and climate change mitigation.

=== Education ===
The Legault government passed Bill 40 on February 8, 2020. This expropriated the province's 60 French school boards, turning them into school service centres.

Bill 40 was passed to expropriate school boards that have been running in English style for 175 years. This did not include nine English school boards. But the move is seen as further undermining English-language education in the province.

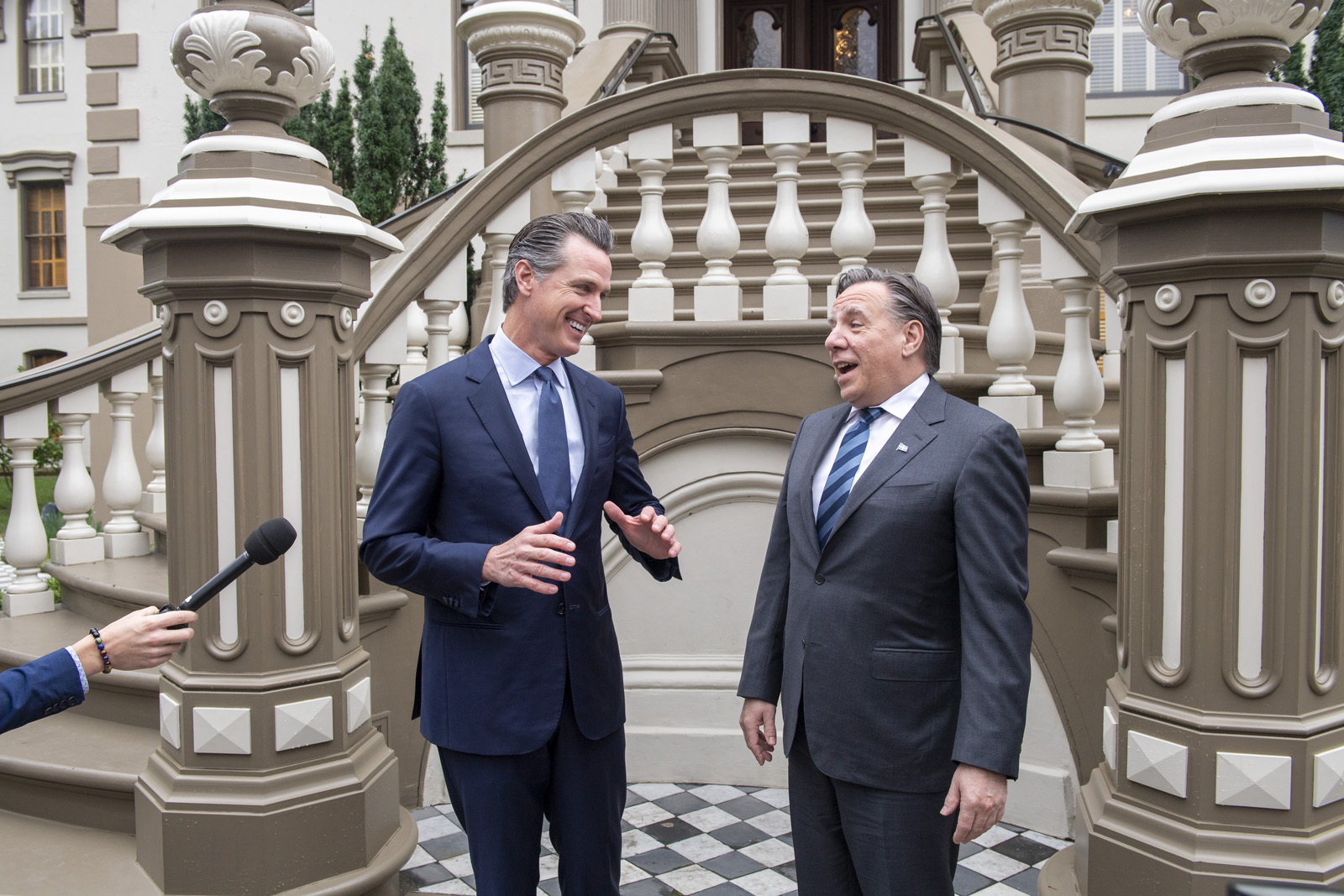
Legault with California Governor Gavin Newsom in Sacramento, December 2019

In 2020, it was reported that the (CAQ) government was going to replace the (Ethics and religious culture (ERC) with a new curriculum which would shift the focus from religion toward culture and citizenship. It would be replaced by 2024 with a new course, Culture et citoyenneté québécoise.

In April 2022, following a controversy over academic freedom at the University of Ottawa, the Legault government tabled Bill 32, a bill on Academic freedom in universities. The bill passed in June 2022.

In December 2023, half a million public sector workers went on strike. This included the Fédération autonome de l'enseignement teachers' union, which impacted over 350,000 students; they later reached an agreement.

=== Economy ===
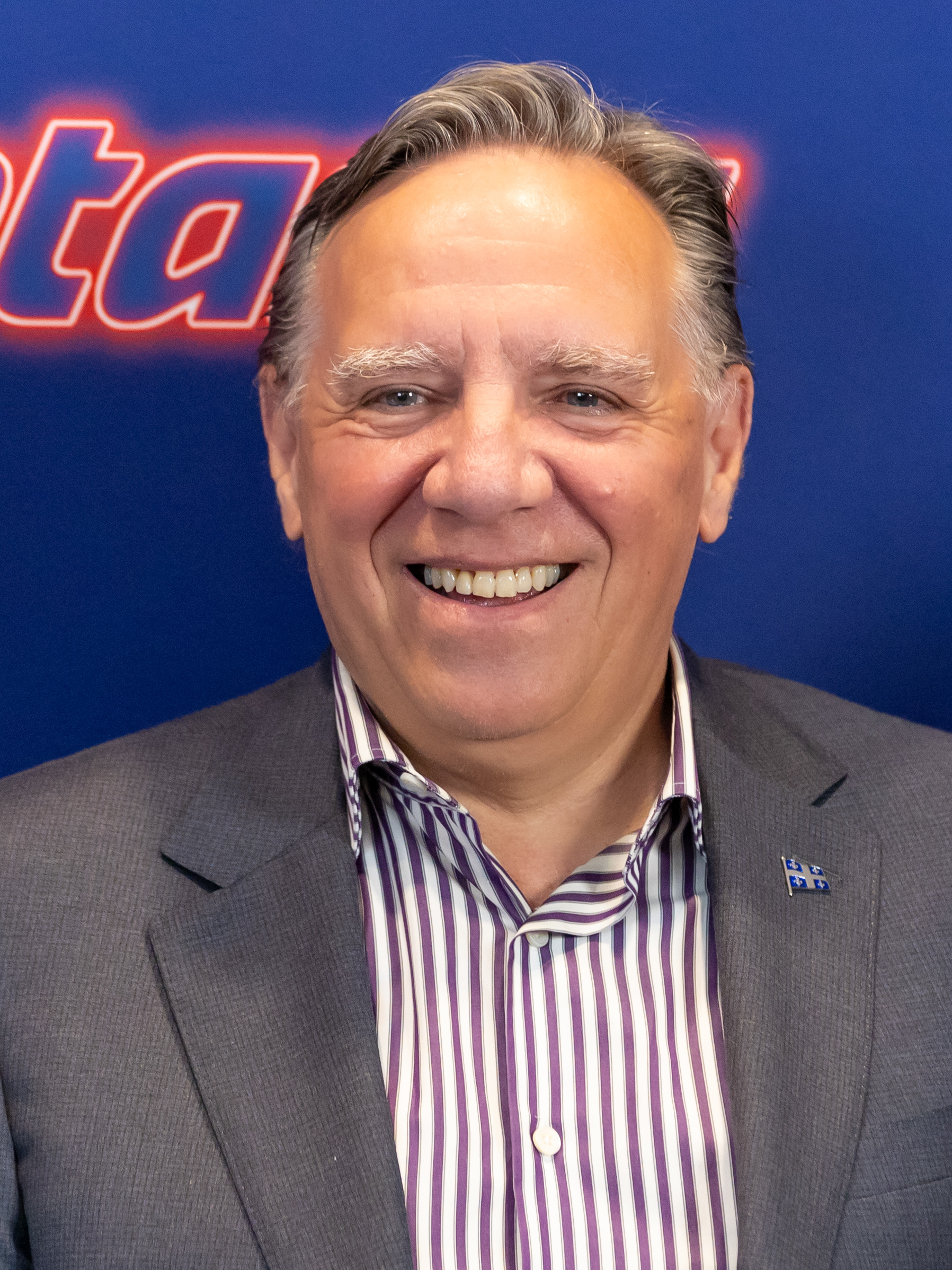
Legault in 2024

Legault and his government has promoted a buy local campaign. His government in early 2020 formed an online directory of local Quebec retailers in a website called Le Panier Bleu — or Blue Basket. The aim of Le Panier Bleu is to be a local version and a competitor to Amazon to sell Quebec products. As early as November 2019 Legault supported calls for the creation of a Quebec version of Amazon, which his economy minister described as a way to serve nationalist customers. In 2025, his government tabled legislation to reduce interprovincial trade barriers in the midst of the United States trade war with Canada.

=== 2022 election ===
Legault led the CAQ again in the 2022 general election to a second straight majority. Legault gained 14 seats in the election, expanding his caucus.

=== Other events ===
Legault endorsed the Conservative Party of Canada in the 2021 Canadian federal election. The Conservative party would see gains in the election in Quebec.

In December 2022, the government passed into law a bill that makes the Oath of Allegiance to the King optional for MNAs. This came after PQ MNAs refused the oath and were stopped from entering the legislature.

In April 2023, the government cancelled plans for a third link for vehicles between Quebec City and Lévis. After a by-election defeat and a dip in popularity, Legault's government announced a bridge and a tunnel for the project. That same year, the government passed Bill 24, which raised the salaries of MNAs and Cabinet ministers.

In the fall of 2023, Swedish battery manufacturer Northvolt announced a new battery gigafactory to be built near Montreal. Initially the factory intended to start production in 2026, but the timeline was delayed by 12 to 18 months according to CAQ minister Pierre Fitzgibbon. In March 2025, Northvolt declared bankruptcy; the CAQ government had invested millions in the proposed $7 billion factory.

In 2024, the government announced that it would fund a new roof for the Montreal Olympic Stadium.

In April 2025, an inquiry began into the Société de l'assurance automobile du Québec (SAAQ)'s digitalization attempts, which ran $500 million over budget. On September 10, 2025, Legault conducted a major Cabinet reshuffle.

In 2024, the government invested millions in bringing two National Hockey League exhibition games to Québec City.

In December 2024, Legault and Newfoundland and Labrador premier Andrew Furey signed a 50-year agreement renegotiating the 1969 Churchill Falls Generating Station agreement. If ratified by both provinces, Quebec would pay Newfoundland and Labrador Hydro $3.5 billion for co-development rights for two anticipated Churchill River energy projects. However, the memorandum of understanding was scrapped and later changed in August 2026 following a change in Newfoundland and Labrador's governing party in 2025.

His government's Bill 2, which linked physicians' compensation to performance targets and prohibited physicians from using labour pressure tactics that could interfere with access to care, caused protests and legal challenges in 2025. Legault himself negotiated with the doctors' union, reaching an agreement that rolled back many of the bill's measures.

In December 2025, his government passed legislation that banned vote buying in municipal and provincial leadership elections.

=== Resignation ===
Opinion polling since the 2022 election

From the 2018 general election until 2023, the Legault government enjoyed one of the highest approval ratings in Canada. However, from late 2023, the situation reversed; the Legault government become one of the most unpopular provincial governments in Canada, suffering from poor opinion polling throughout the 43rd Quebec Legislature. The party also lost the Jean-Talon, Terrebonne, and Arthabaska by-elections, while losing 8 other MNAs due to either expulsions or resignations from caucus. In particular, Cabinet ministers Lionel Carmant, Maïté Blanchette Vézina, Christian Dubé, Pierre Fitzgibbon, and Andrée Laforest all resigned due to various reasons since the 2022 election.

Despite saying he would lead the CAQ into the 2026 election in December 2025, on January 14, 2026, Legault announced his pending resignation as Premier and leader of the CAQ. His party was sitting in either third or fourth place behind the PQ, Liberals, and the Conservative Party of Quebec, with the last poll before Legault's resignation showing the party tied for fourth with Québec solidaire. During his resignation speech, Legault stated that "I can see that, right now, a lot of Quebecers want change first and foremost, and among other things, a change in premier." His final CAQ caucus meeting and Question Period as party leader were on April 2.

In the 2026 Coalition Avenir Québec leadership election, Christine Fréchette defeated Bernard Drainville, becoming party leader and premier-designate. She was sworn in as premier on April 15. He did not seek re-election in the 2026 general election, retiring as the dean of the National Assembly of Quebec. The CAQ would face an electoral wipeout in the election.

== Personal life ==
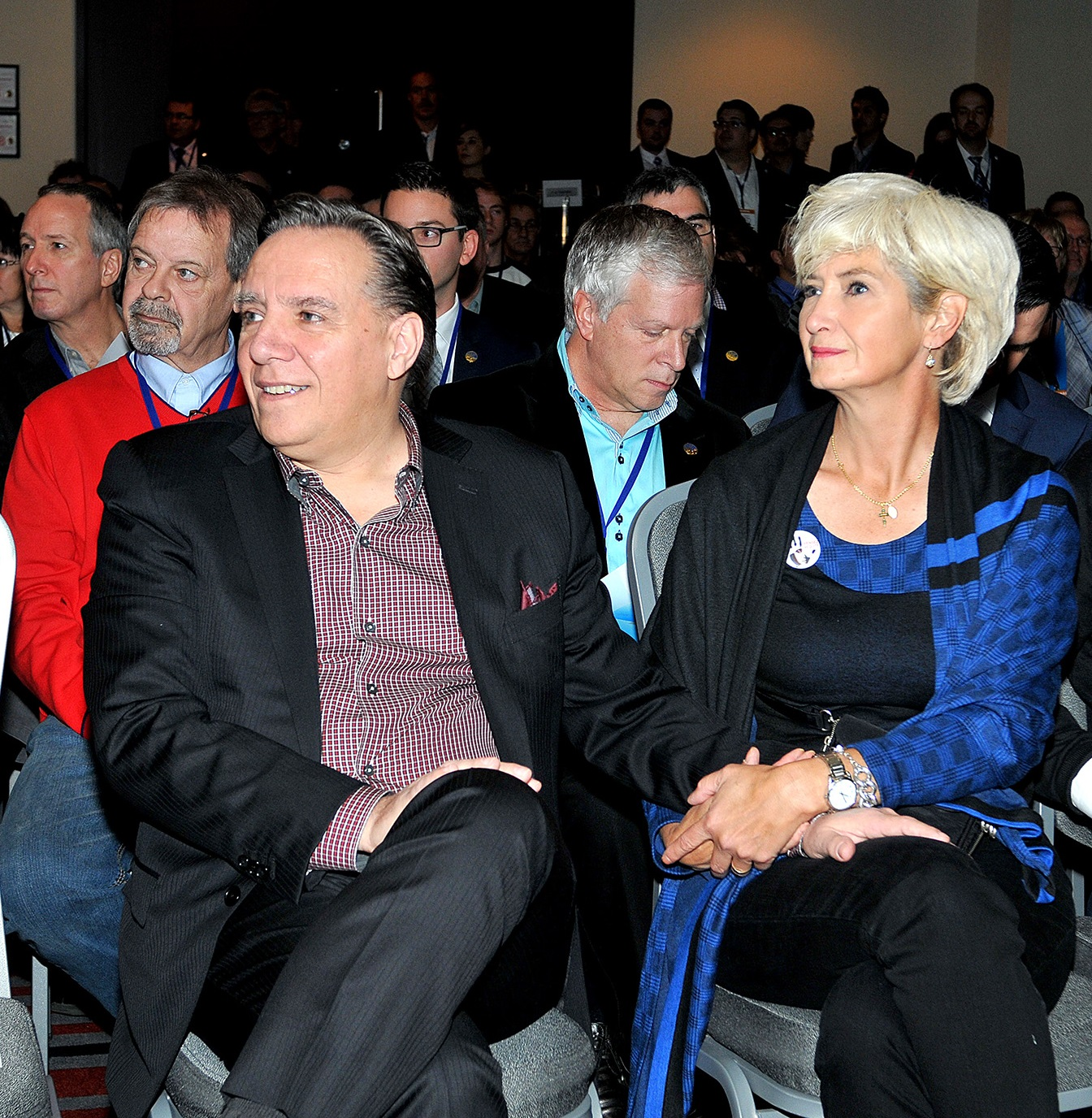
Legault and Brais in 2014

Legault married Isabelle Brais on March 7, 1992, in Mont-Saint-Hilaire, Quebec. They have two children, Xavier and Victor. During Legault's tenure as premier, Brais regularly accompanied him to political and international events and she also carries out official engagements without him, a rare practice among her predecessors.

Legault is baptised Catholic, but non-practising.

== Awards and honours ==
Legault has been a Fellow of the Ordre des comptables agréés du Québec (Order of Chartered Accountants of Québec) since 2000.

== Publications ==
- (2013) Cap sur un Québec gagnant: le projet Saint-Laurent

== Electoral record ==
2022 Quebec general election: L'Assomption
| Party | Candidate | Votes | % | ±% |
|---|---|---|---|---|
| Coalition Avenir Québec | François Legault | 18,637 | 58.63 | +1.60 |
| Québec solidaire | Martin Lefebvre | 4,553 | 14.32 | -2.64 |
| Parti Québécois | Catherine Provost | 4,370 | 13.75 | -0.71 |
| Conservative | Ernesto Almeida | 2,424 | 7.63 | +7.08 |
| Liberal | Thomas Ano-Dumas | 1,806 | 5.68 | -2.32 |
| Total valid votes | | 31,790 | 98.57 | – |
| Total rejected ballots | | 462 | 1.43 | – |
| Turnout | | 32,252 | 70.75 | -1.20 |
| Electors on the lists | | 45,587 | – | – |
| Coalition Avenir Québec hold | | Swing | | |

2018 Quebec general election: L'Assomption
| Party | Candidate | Votes | % | ±% |
|---|---|---|---|---|
| Coalition Avenir Québec | François Legault | 18,237 | 57.03 | +7.65 |
| Québec solidaire | Marie-Claude Brière | 5,425 | 16.96 | +11.16 |
| Parti Québécois | Sylvie Langlois Brouillette | 4,625 | 14.46 | -15.98 |
| Liberal | Virginie Bouchard | 2,558 | 8 | -5.34 |
| Green | Eve Bellavance | 596 | 1.86 | |
| Citoyens au pouvoir | Sylvie Tougas | 363 | 1.14 | |
| Conservative | Charles-Etienne Everitt-Raynault | 175 | 0.55 | +0.1 |
| Total valid votes | | 31,979 | 98.23 | |
| Total rejected ballots | | 575 | 1.77 | |
| Turnout | | 32,554 | 71.95 | |
| Eligible voters | | 45,248 | | |
| Coalition Avenir Québec hold | | Swing | | -1.76 |
Source(s) "Rapport des résultats officiels du scrutin". Élections Québec.

2014 Quebec general election
| Party | Candidate | Votes | % | ±% |
|---|---|---|---|---|
| Coalition Avenir Québec | François Legault | 18,719 | 49.38 | +7.17 |
| Parti Québécois | Pierre Paquette | 11,541 | 30.44 | -9.12 |
| Liberal | Jean-Marc Bergevin | 5,057 | 13.34 | +1.80 |
| Québec solidaire | Sylvain Fournier | 2,198 | 5.80 | +2.20 |
| Option nationale | Gabriel Gauthier | 226 | 0.60 | -1.04 |
| Conservative | Charles-Étienne Raynault | 169 | 0.45 | – |
| Total valid votes | | 37,910 | 98.37 | – |
| Total rejected ballots | | 666 | 1.73 | – |
| Turnout | | 38,576 | 73.38 | -7.05 |
| Electors on the lists | | 52,567 | – | – |
| Coalition Avenir Québec hold | | Swing | | +8.14 |

2012 Quebec general election
| Party | Candidate | Votes | % | ±% |
|---|---|---|---|---|
| Coalition Avenir Québec | François Legault | 17,166 | 42.21 | +23.69 |
| Parti Québécois | Lizabel Nitoi | 16,088 | 39.56 | -7.78 |
| Liberal | Lise Hébert | 4,694 | 11.54 | -16.21 |
| Québec solidaire | Sylvain Fournier | 1,465 | 3.60 | +0.54 |
| Option nationale | Evelyne Marcil | 667 | 1.64 | – |
| Green | Christine Lebel | 588 | 1.45 | -1.28 |
| Total valid votes | | 40,668 | 98.74 | – |
| Total rejected ballots | | 519 | 1.26 | – |
| Turnout | | 41,187 | 80.43 | +17.22 |
| Electors on the lists | | 51,210 | – | – |
| Coalition Avenir Québec gain from Parti Québécois | | Swing | | +15.74 |

2008 Quebec general election
| Party | Candidate | Votes | % | ±% |
|---|---|---|---|---|
| Parti Québécois | François Legault | 16,513 | 56.77 | +14.99 |
| Liberal | Michel Fafard | 6,494 | 22.33 | +6.95 |
| Action démocratique | Jean-Pierre Parrot | 4,774 | 16.41 | -21.35 |
| Québec solidaire | Francois Lépine | 709 | 2.44 | +0.19 |
| Green | J. Michel Popik | 595 | 2.05 | -0.78 |
| Total valid votes | | 29,085 | 98.44 | – |
| Total rejected ballots | | 461 | 1.56 | – |
| Turnout | | 29,546 | 54.02 | -15.01 |
| Electors on the lists | | 54,695 | – | – |

2007 Quebec general election
| Party | Candidate | Votes | % | ±% |
|---|---|---|---|---|
| Parti Québécois | François Legault | 14,670 | 41.78 | -6.07 |
| Action démocratique | Jean-Pierre Parrot | 13,260 | 37.76 | +18.57 |
| Liberal | Yves Prud'Homme | 5,402 | 15.38 | -15.64 |
| Green | Richard Chatagneau | 992 | 2.83 | – |
| Québec solidaire | Alex Boisdequin-Lefort | 789 | 2.25 | +1.15 |
| Total valid votes | | 35,113 | 98.78 | – |
| Total rejected ballots | | 435 | 1.22 | – |
| Turnout | | 35,548 | 69.03 | +4.06 |
| Electors on the lists | | 51,494 | – | – |

2003 Quebec general election
| Party | Candidate | Votes | % | ±% |
|---|---|---|---|---|
| Parti Québécois | François Legault | 14,079 | 47.85 | -7.50 |
| Liberal | Michel F. Brunet | 9,127 | 31.02 | +1.83 |
| Action démocratique | François Girouard | 5,645 | 19.19 | +4.48 |
| UFP | Alex Boisdequin-Lefort | 324 | 1.10 | – |
| Christian Democracy | Gérard Gauthier | 249 | 0.85 | – |

1998 Quebec general election
| Party | Candidate | Votes | % | ±% |
|---|---|---|---|---|
| Parti Québécois | François Legault | 18,076 | 55.35 | +1.49 |
| Liberal | John A. Redmond | 9,533 | 29.19 | -2.84 |
| Action démocratique | Clément Lévesque | 4,805 | 14.71 | +3.00 |
| Socialist Democracy | Francis Martin | 243 | 0.74 | -1.32 |

Political offices
| Preceded by Pauline Marois | Minister of Education (Quebec); 1998–2002 | Succeeded by Sylvain Simard |
| Preceded by Rémy Trudel | Minister of Health and Social Services (Quebec); 2002–2003 | Succeeded by Philippe Couillard |
| Preceded by Roger Bertrand | Minister of Industry and Commerce; 1998 | Succeeded by Bernard Landry |
| Preceded by Rita Dionne-Marsolais | Minister of Science and Technology; 1998 | Succeeded by Jean Rochon |
| Preceded by Gilles Taillon (ADQ) | Official Opposition's Shadow Minister of Finance; 2008–2009 | Succeeded by Nicolas Marceau |
| Preceded by First leader | Leader of Coalition Avenir Québec; 2011–2026 | Succeeded by Christine Fréchette |
| Preceded by Philippe Couillard | Premier of Quebec; 2018–present | Succeeded by Christine Fréchette; Designate |
