= Controversy over academic freedom at the University of Ottawa =

2020 controversy in Canada

The controversy over academic freedom at the University of Ottawa was sparked in September 2020, after a professor used the word "nigger" during a lecture to illustrate how certain groups reclaimed words or phrases traditionally used against them. The professor's use of the word and the ensuing outrage was first reported by Charley Dutil and Paige Holland in the university's anglophone student news outlet, Fulcrum. The university suspended the teacher after an offended student filed a complaint. The debate about whether the suspension was justified and about academic freedom then flared up. The controversy was lively, and generated a lot of media coverage in Canada, and also attracted some attention in Europe. It prompted reactions from the federal government of Canada: the Bloc Québécois defended full academic freedom, while the New Democratic Party and the Green Party of Canada were against it.

A survey suggests that the majority of Canadians agree that freedom of expression should be protected in universities, including the use of offensive language in certain contexts. However, in Quebec, the predominance of the academic freedom to offend by mentioning the N-word seems more strongly or unanimously defended, whereas in English Canada the very mention of the word is more frequently associated with a racist act: thus, according to some professors, the University of Ottawa case reveals the cultural gap between Anglophones and Francophones in Canada. In Quebec, the controversy led to the creation of an independent commission, headed by Alexandre Cloutier, to examine the question of academic freedom. According to the Premier of Quebec, François Legault, who made his statement on February 13, 2021, events like the one at the University of Ottawa are caused by a handful of radical activists who are trying to engage in censorship.

In April 2022, the Quebec CAQ government tabled Bill 32 a bill on academic freedom in universities. The bill passed in June 2022.
