= Ministry of Health and Social Services (Quebec) =

Quebec government ministry

The Ministry of Health, Prevention and Seniors (French: Ministère de la Santé, de la Prévention et des Aînés) is a government ministry in Quebec responsible for developing and implementing provincial policies relating to health and social services. Its responsibilities include public health, disease prevention, the organization of health services and the provision of social services.

The ministry's statutory predecessor, the Ministry of Social Affairs (Ministère des Affaires sociales), was established in 1970. Its name was changed to the Ministry of Health and Social Services in 1985, when the Act respecting the Ministère de la Santé et des Services sociaux replaced the previous statutory title.

In October 2026, the ministry adopted the name Ministry of Health, Prevention and Seniors. As of October 2026, it is headed by Marie-Karlynn Laflamme, while Camille Pellerin-Forget serves as Minister Delegate for Mental Health and Social Services.

== Ministers ==
Name	Took office	Left office	Party
Guy Chevrette	June 21, 1985	December 12, 1985	Parti Québécois
Thérèse Lavoie-Roux	December 12, 1985	October 11, 1989	Liberal
Marc-Yvan Côté	October 11, 1989	January 11, 1994	Liberal
Lucienne Robillard	January 11, 1994	September 26, 1994	Liberal
Jean Rochon	September 26, 1994	December 15, 1998	Parti Québécois
Pauline Marois	December 15, 1998	March 8, 2001	Parti Québécois
Rémy Trudel	March 8, 2001	January 30, 2002	Parti Québécois
François Legault	January 30, 2002	April 29, 2003	Parti Québécois
Philippe Couillard	April 29, 2003	June 25, 2008	Liberal
Yves Bolduc	June 25, 2008	September 19, 2012	Liberal
Réjean Hébert	September 19, 2012	April 23, 2014	Parti Québécois
Gaétan Barrette	April 23, 2014	October 18, 2018	Liberal
Danielle McCann	October 18, 2018	June 22, 2020	Coalition Avenir Québec
Christian Dubé	June 22, 2020	December 18, 2025	Coalition Avenir Québec
Sonia Bélanger	December 19, 2025	October 21, 2026	Coalition Avenir Québec
Marie-Karlynn Laflamme	October 21, 2026		Parti Québécois
