= 37th Quebec Legislature =

Legislative term of the National Assembly of Quebec (2003–2007)

The 37th National Assembly of Quebec, Canada, was elected in the 2003 Quebec general election, and sat from June 4, 2003 to March 10, 2006 (first session) and March 14, 2006 to February 21, 2007 (second session).

At dissolution, the 125 seats of the National Assembly were distributed as follows:

Affiliation	Members	Female Members
Parti libéral du Québec	72	22
Parti Québécois	45	15
Action démocratique du Québec	5	1
Independent	1	0
Vacant	2	-
Total	125	38
Government Majority	21	

- Liberal member Daniel Bouchard (Megantic-Compton) sat as an independent after March 16, 2004.
- Liberal member Russell Williams (Nelligan) resigned on March 9, 2004. Yolande James (PLQ) won the by-election with 52.6% of the vote.
- Liberal member Marc Bellemare (Vanier) resigned on April 28, 2004. Sylvain Légaré (ADQ) won the by-election with 46.8% of the vote.
- Liberal member Christos Sirros (Laurier-Dorion) resigned on June 17, 2004. Elsie Lefebvre (PQ) won the by-election with 46.1% of the vote.
- Parti Québécois member André Boisclair (Gouin) resigned on August 17, 2004. Nicolas Girard (PQ) won the by-election with 57.8% of the vote.

By-elections were held in these four districts on September 20, 2004.

- Libéral member Yves Séguin (Outremont) resigned on May 26, 2005. Raymond Bachand (PLQ) won the by-election with 48.8% of the vote.
- Leader of the Opposition and Former Premier Bernard Landry (Verchères) resigned on June 6, 2005. Stéphane Bergeron (PQ) won the by-election with 69.2% of the vote.

By-elections were held in these two districts on December 12, 2005.

- Parti Québécois member André Boulerice (Sainte-Marie-Saint-Jacques) resigned on September 12, 2005. Martin Lemay (PQ) won the by-election with 41,2% of the vote.

A by-election was held in this district on April 10, 2006.

- Parti Québécois member Pauline Marois (Taillon) resigned on March 20, 2006. Marie Malavoy (PQ) won the by-election with 43,6% of the vote.
- Parti Québécois member Nicole Léger (Pointe-aux-Trembles) resigned on June 1, 2006. André Boisclair (PQ) won the by-election with 70,9% of the vote.

By-elections were held in these two districts on August 14, 2006.

- Parti Québécois member Jean-Pierre Charbonneau (Borduas) resigned on November 15, 2006.
- Liberal member Diane Legault (Chambly) resigned on November 15, 2006.

== Member list ==
Cabinet Ministers are in bold, Leaders are in italics and the President of the National Assembly has a dagger next to his name.

Name	Party	Riding	First elected / previously elected	No. of terms
**Pierre Corbeil**	Libéral	Abitibi-Est	2003	1st term
François Gendron	Parti Québécois	Abitibi-Ouest	1976	7th term
Yvan Bordeleau	Libéral	Acadie	1989	4th term
**Lise Thériault**	Libéral	Anjou	2002	2nd term
David Whissell	Libéral	Argenteuil	1998	3rd term
Claude Bachand	Libéral	Arthabaska	2003	1st term
Janvier Grondin	ADQ	Beauce-Nord	2003	1st term
Diane Leblanc	Libéral	Beauce-Sud	1997	3rd term
Serge Deslières	Parti Québécois	Beauharnois	1994	3rd term
Dominique Vien	Libéral	Bellechasse	2003	1st term
Alexandre Bourdeau	Parti Québécois	Berthier	2003	1st term
Claude Cousineau	Parti Québécois	Bertrand	1998	2nd term
Richard Legendre	Parti Québécois	Blainville	2001	2nd term
**Nathalie Normandeau**	Libéral	Bonaventure	1998	2nd term
Jean-Pierre Charbonneau	Parti Québécois	Borduas	1976, (Note: Verchères) 1994	6th term*
**Line Beauchamp**	Libéral	Bourassa-Sauvé	1998	2nd term
Diane Lemieux	Parti Québécois	Bourget	1998	2nd term
Pierre Paradis	Libéral	Brome-Missisquoi	1980	7th term
Diane Legault	Libéral	Chambly	2003	1st term
Noëlla Champagne	Parti Québécois	Champlain	2003	1st term
**Benoît Pelletier**	Libéral	Chapleau	1998	2nd term
Éric Mercier	Libéral	Charlesbourg	2003	1st term
Rosaire Bertrand	Parti Québécois	Charlevoix	1994	3rd term
**Jean-Marc Fournier**	Libéral	Châteauguay	1994	3rd term
Sarah Perreault	Libéral	Chauveau	2003	1st term
Stéphane Bédard	Parti Québécois	Chicoutimi	1998	2nd term
Thomas Mulcair	Libéral	Chomedey	1994	3rd term
Marc Picard	ADQ	Chutes-de-la-Chaudière	2003	1st term
Michèle Lamquin-Éthier	Libéral	Crémazie	1997	3rd term
**Lawrence Bergman**	Libéral	D'Arcy-McGee	1994	3rd term
Hélène Robert	Parti Québécois	Deux-Montagnes	1994	3rd term
Normand Jutras	Parti Québécois	Drummond	1994	3rd term
Jacques Côté	Parti Québécois	Dubuc	1998	2nd term
Lorraine Richard	Parti Québécois	Duplessis	2003	1st term
**Michelle Courchesne**	Libéral	Fabre	2003	1st term
Laurent Lessard	Libéral	Frontenac	2003	1st term
Guy Lelièvre	Parti Québécois	Gaspé	1994	3rd term
Réjean Lafrenière	Libéral	Gatineau	1989	4th term
André Boisclair	Parti Québécois	Gouin	1989	4th term
Nicolas Girard (2004)	Parti Québécois	Gouin	2004	1st term
Pierre Descoteaux	Libéral	Groulx	2003	1st term
Louise Harel	Parti Québécois	Hochelaga-Maisonneuve	1981	6th term
Roch Cholette	Libéral	Hull	1998	2nd term
André Chenail	Libéral	Huntingdon	1989	4th term
Jean Rioux	Libéral	Iberville	2003	1st term
Maxime Arseneau	Parti Québécois	Îles-de-la-Madeleine	1998	2nd term
**Geoffrey Kelley**	Libéral	Jacques-Cartier	1994	3rd term
**Michel Després**	Libéral	Jean-Lesage	1985, 1998	4th term*
**Margaret Delisle**	Libéral	Jean-Talon	1994	3rd term
Michel Bissonnet †	Libéral	Jeanne-Mance–Viger	1981	6th term
Claude Boucher	Parti Québécois	Johnson	1994	3rd term
Jonathan Valois	Parti Québécois	Joliette	2003	1st term
**Françoise Gauthier**	Libéral	Jonquière	2001	2nd term
**Claude Béchard**	Libéral	Kamouraska-Témiscouata	1997	3rd term
Jean-Claude St-André	Parti Québécois	L'Assomption	1996	3rd term
France Hamel	Libéral	La Peltrie	2003	1st term
Fatima Houda-Pepin	Libéral	La Pinière	1994	3rd term
Jean Dubuc	Libéral	La Prairie	2003	1st term
Sylvain Pagé	Parti Québécois	Labelle	2001	2nd term
Stéphan Tremblay	Parti Québécois	Lac-Saint-Jean	2002	2nd term
Tony Tomassi	Libéral	LaFontaine	2003	1st term
**Michel Audet**	Libéral	Laporte	2003	1st term
Christos Sirros	Libéral	Laurier-Dorion	1981	6th term
Elsie Lefebvre (2004)	Parti Québécois	Laurier-Dorion	2004	1st term
Alain Paquet	Libéral	Laval-des-Rapides	2003	1st term
**Julie Boulet**	Libéral	Laviolette	2001	2nd term
**Carole Théberge**	Libéral	Lévis	2003	1st term
Sylvie Roy	ADQ	Lotbinière	2003	1st term
Sam Hamad	Libéral	Louis-Hébert	2003	1st term
**Monique Jérôme-Forget**	Libéral	Marguerite-Bourgeoys	1998	2nd term
Pierre Moreau	Libéral	Marguerite-D'Youville	2003	1st term
Cécile Vermette	Parti Québécois	Marie-Victorin	1985	5th term
François Ouimet	Libéral	Marquette	1994	3rd term
Francine Gaudet	Libéral	Maskinongé	2003	1st term
Luc Thériault	Parti Québécois	Masson	2003	1st term
Nancy Charest	Libéral	Matane	2003	1st term
Danielle Doyer	Parti Québécois	Matapédia	1994	3rd term
Daniel Bouchard	Libéral	Mégantic-Compton	2003	1st term
Daniel Bouchard	Independent	Mégantic-Compton	2003	1st term
Daniel Turp	Parti Québécois	Mercier	2003	1st term
Maurice Clermont	Libéral	Mille-Îles	2003	1st term
Denise Beaudoin	Parti Québécois	Mirabel	2003	1st term
**Philippe Couillard**	Libéral	Mont-Royal	2003	1st term
Norbert Morin	Libéral	Montmagny-L'Islet	2003	1st term
Raymond Bernier	Libéral	Montmorency	2003	1st term
Russell Williams	Libéral	Nelligan	1989	4th term
Yolande James (2004)	Libéral	Nelligan	2004	1st term
Michel Morin	Parti Québécois	Nicolet-Yamaska	1994	3rd term
Russell Copeman	Libéral	Notre-Dame-de-Grâce	1994	3rd term
Pierre Reid	Libéral	Orford	2003	1st term
Yves Séguin	Libéral	Outremont	1985, (Note: Montmorency) 2003	3rd term*
**Raymond Bachand** (2005)	Libéral	Outremont	2005	1st term
Norman MacMillan	Libéral	Papineau	1989	4th term
Nicole Léger	Parti Québécois	Pointe-aux-Trembles	1996	3rd term
André Boisclair (2006)	Parti Québécois	Pointe-aux-Trembles	1989, (Note: Gouin) 2006	5th term*
Charlotte L'Écuyer	Libéral	Pontiac	2003	1st term
Jean-Pierre Soucy	Libéral	Portneuf	2003	1st term
Lucie Papineau	Parti Québécois	Prévost	1997	3rd term
Marjolain Dufour	Parti Québécois	René-Lévesque	2003	1st term
Sylvain Simard	Parti Québécois	Richelieu	1994	3rd term
**Yvon Vallières**	Libéral	Richmond	1973, 1981	6th term*
Solange Charest	Parti Québécois	Rimouski	1994	3rd term
Mario Dumont	ADQ	Rivière-du-Loup	1994	3rd term
Pierre Marsan	Libéral	Robert-Baldwin	1994	3rd term
Karl Blackburn	Libéral	Roberval	2003	1st term
Rita Dionne-Marsolais	Parti Québécois	Rosemont	1994	3rd term
François Legault	Parti Québécois	Rousseau	1998	2nd term
Daniel Bernard	Libéral	Rouyn-Noranda–Témiscamingue	2003	1st term
**Monique Gagnon-Tremblay**	Libéral	Saint-François	1985	5th term
Nicole Loiselle	Libéral	Saint-Henri–Sainte-Anne	1989	4th term
Léandre Dion	Parti Québécois	Saint-Hyacinthe	1994	3rd term
Jean-Pierre Paquin	Libéral	Saint-Jean	2003	1st term
**Jacques Dupuis**	Libéral	Saint-Laurent	1998	2nd term
Claude Pinard	Parti Québécois	Saint-Maurice	1994	3rd term
André Boulerice	Parti Québécois	Sainte-Marie–Saint-Jacques	1985	5th term
Martin Lemay (2006)	Parti Québécois	Sainte-Marie–Saint-Jacques	2006	1st term
Bernard Brodeur	Libéral	Shefford	1994	4th term
**Jean Charest**	Libéral	Sherbrooke	1998	2nd term
Lucie Charlebois	Libéral	Soulanges	2003	1st term
Pauline Marois	Parti Québécois	Taillon	1981, (Note: La Peltrie) 1989	5th term*
Marie Malavoy (2006)	Parti Québécois	Taillon	1994, (Note: Sherbrooke) 2006	2nd term*
Agnès Maltais	Parti Québécois	Taschereau	1998	2nd term
Jocelyne Caron	Parti Québécois	Terrebonne	1989	4th term
André Gabias	Libéral	Trois-Rivières	2003	1st term
Michel Létourneau	Parti Québécois	Ungava	1994	3rd term
Camil Bouchard	Parti Québécois	Vachon	2003	1st term
Marc Bellemare	Libéral	Vanier	2003	1st term
Sylvain Légaré (2004)	ADQ	Vanier	2004	1st term
**Yvon Marcoux**	Libéral	Vaudreuil	1998	2nd term
Bernard Landry	Parti Québécois	Verchères	1976, (Note: Fabre) 1994	5th term*
Stéphane Bergeron (2005)	Parti Québécois	Verchères	2005	1st term
**Henri-François Gautrin**	Libéral	Verdun	1989	4th term
William Cusano	Libéral	Viau	1981	6th term
Vincent Auclair	Libéral	Vimont	2003	1st term
Jacques Chagnon	Libéral	Westmount–Saint-Louis	1985	5th term

== Cabinet Ministers ==
- Prime Minister and Executive Council President: Jean Charest
- Deputy Premier: Monique Gagnon-Tremblay (2003–2005), Jacques P. Dupuis (2005–2007)
- Agriculture, Fisheries and Food: Françoise Gauthier (2003–2005) Yvon Vallières, (2005–2007)
- Employment, Social Solidarity and Family: Claude Béchard (2003–2005)
- Family (Delegate): Carole Théberge (2003–2005)
  - Employment and Social Solidarity: Michelle Courchesne (2005–2007)
  - Family, Seniors and Status of Women: Carole Théberge (2005–2007)
- Labor: Michel Després (2003–2005), Laurent Lessard (2005–2007)
- Government Administration and President of the Treasury Board: Monique Jérôme-Forget
- Information Access:Benoît Pelletier (2005–2007)
- Government online: Henri-François Gautrin (2005–2006)
- Government Services:Pierre Reid (2005–2006), Henri-François Gautrin (2006–2007)
- Culture and Communications: Line Beauchamp
- International Relations: Monique Gagnon-Tremblay
- Indian Affairs: Benoît Pelletier (2003–2005), Geoffrey Kelley (2005–2007)
- Canadian Francophonie: Benoît Pelletier (2005–2007)
- Health and Social Services: Philippe Couillard
- Health and Status of Seniors (Delegate): Julie Boulet (2003–2005)
- Health, Social Services and Status of Seniors (Delegate): Julie Boulet (2003)
- Education: Pierre Reid (2003–2005), Jean-Marc Fournier (2005–2007)
- Relations with the Citizens and Immigration: Michelle Courchesne (2003–2005)
  - Immigration and Cultural Communities: Lise Thériault (2005–2007)
- Youth Protection and Rehabilitation: Margaret Delisle
- Transportation: Yvon Marcoux (2003–2005), Michel Després (2005–2007)
- Transportation (Delegate): Julie Boulet (2003–2007)
- Canadian Intergovernmental Affairs: Benoît Pelletier
- Municipal Affairs and Regions: Nathalie Normandeau (2005–2007)
- Democratic Institutions Reform: Jacques P. Dupuis (2003–2005), Benoît Pelletier (2005–2007)
- Sport and Recreation: Jean-Marc Fournier
- Environment: Thomas J.Mulcair (2003–2005)
  - Sustainable Development and Parks: Thomas J.Mulcair (2005)
    - Sustainable Development, Environment and Parks: Thomas J. Mulcair (2005–2006), Claude Bechard (2006–2007)
- Natural Resources, Wildlife and Parcs: Sam Hamad (2003–2005)
  - Natural Resources and Wildlife: Pierre Corbeil (2005–2007)
- Forests, Wildlife and Parks: Pierre Corbeil (2003–2005)
- Justice: Marc Bellemare (2003–2004), Jacques P. Dupuis (2004–2005), Yvon Marcoux (2005–2007)
- Public Safety: Jacques Chagnon (2003–2005), Jacques P. Dupuis (2005–2007)
- Finances: Yves Seguin (2003–2005), Michel Audet (2007)
- Revenue: Lawrence Bergman
- Regional development and Tourism (Delegate): Nathalie Normandeau (2003–2005)
  - Tourism: Françoise Gauthier (2005–2007)
- Interior Commerce Accord: Benoît Pelletier (2005–2007)
- Economic and Regional Development: Michel Audet (2003–2004)
  - Economic and Regional Development and Research: Michel Audet (2004–2005)
    - Economic Development, Innovation and Export Trade : Claude Béchard (2005–2006), Raymond Bachand (2006–2007)
