= Véronyque Tremblay =

Canadian politician

Member of the National Assembly of Quebec for Chauveau
- In office June 8, 2015 – August 29, 2018
- Preceded by: Gérard Deltell
- Succeeded by: Sylvain Lévesque

Personal details
- Born: January 27, 1974 (age 52) Saint-Ambroise, Quebec, Canada
- Party: Quebec Liberal Party

Véronyque Tremblay (born January 27, 1974) is a Canadian journalist and politician. She represented the electoral district of Chauveau as a member of the Quebec Liberal Party.

Born in Saint-Ambroise, Quebec, Tremblay was a television and radio journalist for TQS, TVA, Le Canal Nouvelles and CJMF-FM, prior to becoming a politician.

== Electoral record ==
Quebec provincial by-election, June 8, 2015 On the resignation of Gérard Deltell
Party	Candidate	Votes	%	±%
Liberal	Véronyque Tremblay	10,330	41.32	+11.48
Coalition Avenir Québec	Jocelyne Cazin	8,392	33.57	-18.73
Parti Québécois	Sébastien Couture	3,844	15.38	+3.20
Conservative	Adrien D. Pouliot	1,239	4.96	+3.91
Québec solidaire	Marjolaine Bouchard	863	3.45	-0.51
Parti des sans Parti	Frank Malenfant	171	0.68	–
Option nationale	Stéphanie Grimard	125	0.50	-0.17
Équipe Autonomiste	Manuel Mathieu	34	0.14	–
Total valid votes		24,998	99.13	
Total rejected ballots		219	0.87	
Turnout		25,217	43.11	
Electors on the lists		58,501	–	
Liberal gain from Coalition Avenir Québec		Swing		+15.11
