= Adrien D. Pouliot =

Canadian politician (born 1957)

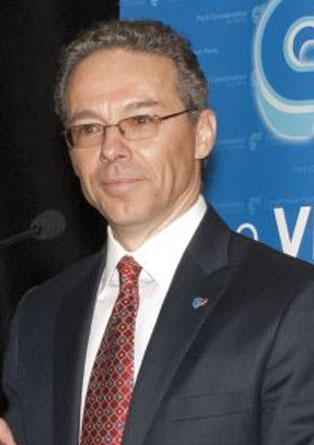
- Pouliot in 2013.

Leader of Conservative Party of Quebec
- In office February 23, 2013 – April 17, 2021
- Preceded by: Luc Harvey
- Succeeded by: Éric Duhaime

Personal details
- Born: February 27, 1957 (age 69) Sainte-Foy, Quebec
- Citizenship: Canadian
- Party: Conservative Party of Quebec
- Parent: Jean Pouliot (father)
- Relatives: Adrien Pouliot (grandfather)
- Education: Université de Sherbrooke

Adrien D. Pouliot (born February 27, 1957, in Sainte-Foy, Quebec) is a Quebec lawyer, businessman and politician.

He is the son of Jean Pouliot, a pioneer of Canadian broadcasting, and the grandson of the mathematician and Université Laval Dean of Science Adrien Pouliot.

He served as the Leader of the Conservative Party of Quebec from 2013 to 2021. Under his leadership, the party gained notoriety and was positioned on the right of the Quebec political spectrum.

== Early life and education ==
Adrien Denys Pouliot was raised in Sainte-Foy (Québec), where his family moved when he was 3 months old.

Educated at the Petit Séminaire de Québec, Pouliot studied law and received the Bar Award from the Université de Sherbrooke in 1978. He successfully completed the Bar of Quebec exam in 1979 at Quebec City and was entered on the Roll of the Order the same year.

== Early career ==
From 1980 to 1984, he practised corporate and commercial law, in particular the law relating to companies mergers and acquisitions as well as to public–private partnerships, within the firm Ogilvy Renault, Montreal.

In 1984, he joined CFCF, the family business broadcasting and cable television firm, as the Assistant to the President. In 1986, the company was listed and secured a licence to open Télévision Quatre Saisons. In 1987, he became President of CFCF-12 station and then President of CFCF Inc. in 1991. Under his direction, the company evolved to become the fourth largest cable distributor in Canada with more than 425,000 subscribers and nearly 1,200 employees before being sold to Vidéotron in 1996 for $687 million. He remained at the helm until the transition of the company was complete in 1997.

In October 1999, he acquired 75% of Entourage Solutions technologiques, a technical services company specializing in the installation and maintenance of telecommunication and computer networks and equipment. During the six years he was the majority shareholder, the company doubled its revenues and its profitability increased by a factor of 20. In 2005, Bell Canada repurchased its shares in the company.

In 2005, he became co-owner and the first Chairman of the First National AlarmCap Income Trust, a Toronto-listed company that would become the third largest residential and commercial security company in Canada in 2014.

He currently owns the investment firm Capital Draco Inc..

Pouliot has been a board member of the Montreal Children's Hospital, as well as the Montreal Heart Institute Research Foundation. For nearly 10 years, he served as a governor of McGill University. He also contributed to this institution as the Chair of the Audit Committee, a member of the Finance Committee, a member of the Pension Administration Committee, and a member of the endowment fund. He is now a Governor Emeritus of this institution. He has been a member of the Ville-Marie Economic Development Corporation, a government agency promoting Montreal's economic development. He was also Chairman of the Board of Governors of the Junior Chamber of Commerce of Montreal. He has supported the training and education of young business people by actively participating in the Young Presidents' Organization and its sister organization, World Presidents' Organization, which combined bring together nearly 25,000 business executives in 130 countries, and by serving on its International Board of Directors and its Audit Committee.

== Political and social career ==
In 1999, Pouliot participated in the launch of the Montreal Economic Institute. He was chairman for 8 years and was a member of the Board of Directors for 12 years. He was President of the Ligue des contribuables, an organization founded in 2006 that is designed to inform taxpayers about how their tax dollars are spent by governments. Pouliet also appears as a regular columnist on the Jeff Fillion show at the radio station CHOI Radio X.

=== Action démocratique du Québec ===
In 2011, the Action démocratique du Québec recruited him as Vice-Chair of the Policy Commission.

During the campaign for the merger of the ADQ in the Coalition Avenir Québec, Adrien Pouliot spoke out against the merger publicly and participated in a tour of Quebec in order to convince the members of the ADQ to reject the merger with the president of the political commission of the ADQ, Claude Garcia.

Disappointed with the merger, Adrien Pouliot did not join the Coalition Avenir Québec and declared himself publicly as "political orphan".

=== 2013 Conservative Party of Quebec leadership election ===
Following the Quebec general election of 2012, where the party obtained 0.18% of the votes cast, Luc Harvey resigned as leader and a leadership race was organized.

After the merger of the Action démocratique du Québec in the Coalition Avenir Québec, after several months of reflection, and after considering running for the leadership of the Quebec Liberal Party in the purpose of pushing this party to the right on economic issues, Pouliot decided in January 2013 to run for the Conservative Party of Quebec.

After the withdrawal of the candidacy of the other candidate, Daniel Brisson, February 23, 2013, at the General Council of the party, Pouliot was sworn in as leader of the Conservative Party of Quebec.

=== Redesign of the party platform ===
At the October 2013 National Congress, members adopted a new official platform for the party under the verbatim of the "Ideological Compass":

- Individual rights and freedoms;
- Personal responsibility;
- Market economy;
- A smaller state serving Quebecers;
- Quebecers confident of success in Canada and around the world.

=== Resignation as CPQ Leader ===
On October 16, 2020, Pouliot announced his resignation as leader of the Conservative Party to focus on his business ventures. He was succeeded by radio columnist Éric Duhaime.

== Electoral record ==
2018 Quebec general election: Chauveau
Party	Candidate	Votes	%	±%
Coalition Avenir Québec	Sylvain Lévesque	18,424	47.06	+13.37
Liberal	Véronyque Tremblay	8,797	22.47	-18.9
Québec solidaire	Francis Lajoie	4,052	10.35	+6.95
Parti Québécois	Jonathan Gagnon	3,603	9.2	-6.22
Conservative	Adrien D. Pouliot	3,371	8.61	+3.69
Green	Sabir Isufi	613	1.57	–
New Democratic	Mona Belleau	286	0.73	–
Total valid votes		39,146	98.03	–
Total rejected ballots		787	1.97	–
Turnout		39,933	70.8	+27.51
Electors on the lists		56,405	–	–

Quebec provincial by-election, June 8, 2015: Chauveau Resignation of Gérard Deltell
Party	Candidate	Votes	%	±%
Liberal	Véronyque Tremblay	10,330	41.32	+11.48
Coalition Avenir Québec	Jocelyne Cazin	8,392	33.57	-18.73
Parti Québécois	Sébastien Couture	3,844	15.38	+3.20
Conservative	Adrien D. Pouliot	1,239	4.96	+3.91
Québec solidaire	Marjolaine Bouchard	863	3.45	-0.51
Parti des sans Parti	Frank Malenfant	171	0.68	–
Option nationale	Stéphanie Grimard	125	0.50	-0.17
Équipe Autonomiste	Manuel Mathieu	34	0.14	–
Total valid votes		24,998	99.13	
Total rejected ballots		219	0.87	
Turnout		25,217	43.11	
Electors on the lists		58,501	–	
Liberal gain from Coalition Avenir Québec		Swing		+15.11

Quebec provincial by-election, October 20, 2014: Lévis Resignation of Christian Dubé
Party	Candidate	Votes	%	±%
Coalition Avenir Québec	François Paradis	10,110	46.79	+6.30
Liberal	Janet Jones	7,014	32.46	-2.46
Parti Québécois	Alexandre Bégin	1,788	8.28	-8.34
Québec solidaire	Yv Bonnier Viger	1,654	7.66	+1.50
Conservative	Adrien D. Pouliot	503	2.33	+1.54
Green	Alex Tyrrell	238	1.10	–
Option nationale	François Thériault	168	0.78	+0.06
Independent	Maxime Lapointe	60	0.28	–
Unité Nationale	Daniel Lachance	30	0.14	-0.17
Parti indépendantiste	Grégoire Bonneau-Fortier	27	0.12	–
Équipe Autonomiste	Guy Boivin	13	0.06	–
Total valid votes		21,605	99.24	–
Total rejected ballots		165	0.76	–
Turnout		21,770	46.31	-29.12
Electors on the lists		47,006	–	–
Coalition Avenir Québec hold		Swing		+4.38

2014 Quebec general election: Montmorency
Party	Candidate	Votes	%
Liberal	Raymond Bernier	17,113	40.42
Coalition Avenir Québec	Michelyne St-Laurent	14,323	33.83
Parti Québécois	Michel Guimond	7,242	17.11
Québec solidaire	Jean-Pierre Duchesneau	1,981	4.68
Conservative	Adrien D. Pouliot	1,015	2.40
Green	Marielle Parent	407	0.96
Option nationale	Jean Bouchard	255	1.51
Total valid votes		42,336	98.89
Total rejected ballots		476	1.11
Turnout		42,812	77.00
Electors on the lists		55,950	–

== Publications ==
- Des idées pour débloquer le Québec, Éditions Accent grave, 223 p. (ISBN 9782924151150).
