= Raymond Brouillet =

Canadian politician (born 1933)

Member of the Quebec National Assembly for Chauveau
- In office 1981–1985
- Preceded by: Louis O'Neill
- Succeeded by: Rémy Poulin
- In office 1994–2003
- Preceded by: Rémy Poulin
- Succeeded by: Sarah Perreault

Personal details
- Born: September 17, 1933 (age 92) Montreal, Quebec
- Party: Parti Québécois
- Occupation: Professor

Raymond Brouillet (born September 17, 1933) was a Canadian politician. Brouillet served as a three-term Member of the National Assembly of Quebec.

== Early life ==
Brouillet was born in Montreal, Quebec in 1933 to Gustave Brouillet, a local businessman, and Dorina Moisan. He was educated at parish schools in Repentigny, before enrolling at Collège de l'Assomption in 1947. In 1955, he moved to Université de Montreal and became an officer in the Canadian Army's Armoured Corps. Brouillet was ordained as a secular priest in 1959,

Brouillet studied philosophy, serving as a professor of philosophy at College de l'Assomption, Cégep de Maisonneuve and Université Laval. He would later serve as the vice-president and president of the Société de philosophie de Québec

== Member of the National Assembly ==
Brouillet joined the Parti Québécois in 1971 and worked behind the scenes before he was elected to the National Assembly in the 1981 election, in which the Parti Québécois formed the government. He was defeated in the next election and was defeated in the 1989 election as well. During this period, he served as the party's head representative in Chauveau and the larger Chaudiere-Appalaches region.

Brouillet would return to office in the 1994 election, in which the Parti Québécois swept back into power. He would serve in office until 2003, when he decided to step down.

== Later life ==
In retirement, Brouillet remained involved in several causes. He became a member of the Order of La Pléiade in 2003, and remains a member of the Knights of Columbus.

He married Ghislaine Villeneuve, a native of Chicoutimi, in 1970, in Sainte-Rose-du-Nord. The couple raised three daughters, Eugenie, Marie-Odile and Catherine. He is the grandfather of four grandchildren, Philip, Matthew, Simone and Etienne.
