= Émilie Foster =

Canadian politician

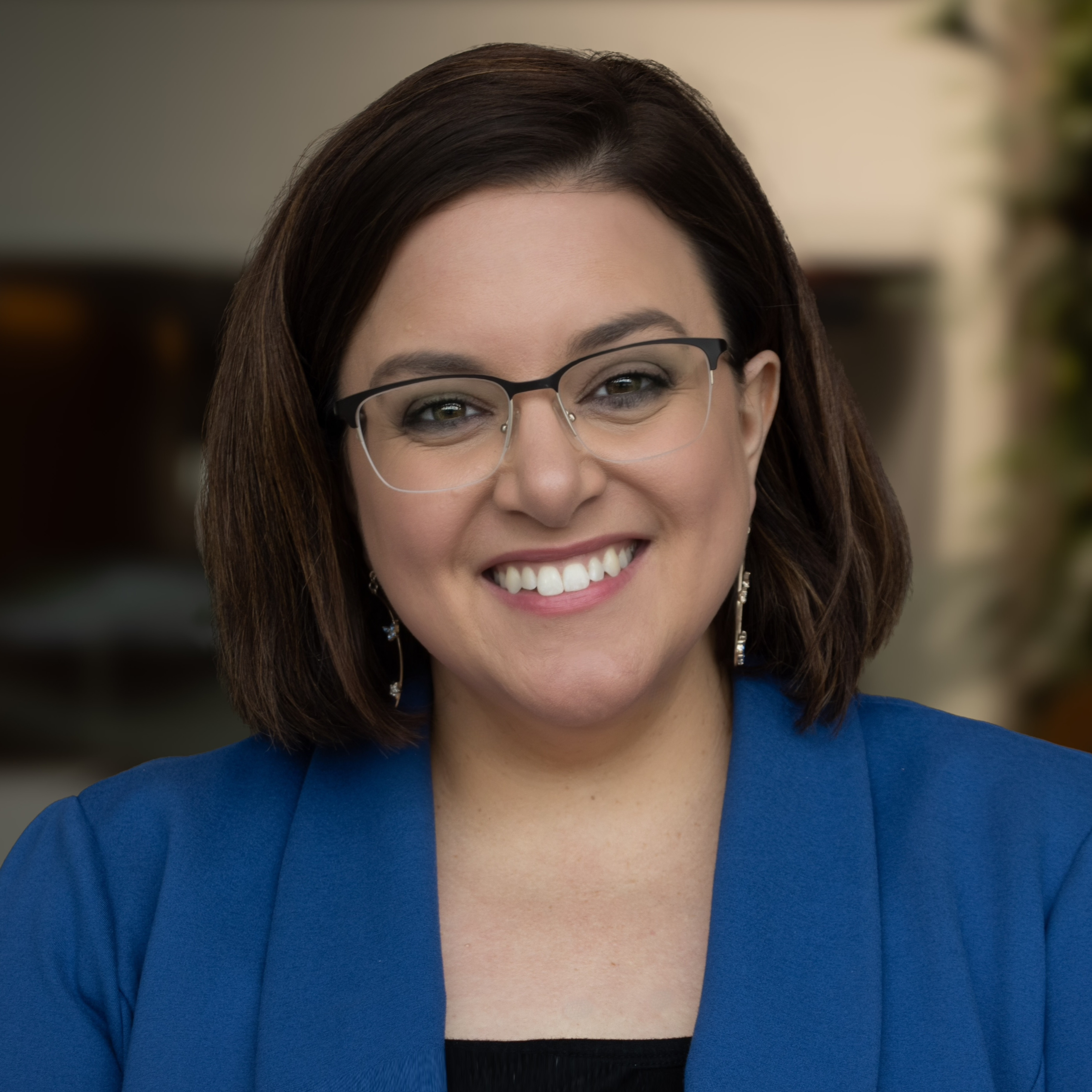

Member of the National Assembly of Quebec for Charlevoix–Côte-de-Beaupré
- In office October 1, 2018 – August 28, 2022
- Preceded by: Caroline Simard
- Succeeded by: Kariane Bourassa

Personal details
- Party: Coalition Avenir Québec

Émilie Foster is an academic and former Canadian politician, who was elected to the National Assembly of Quebec in the 2018 provincial election. She represented the electoral district of Charlevoix–Côte-de-Beaupré as a member of the Coalition Avenir Québec. She did not run for re-election in the Quebec 2022 provincial election. Foster is currently an associate professor of applied politics at Carleton University.

== Electoral record ==
2018 Quebec general election: Charlevoix–Côte-de-Beaupré
Party	Candidate	Votes	%	±%
Coalition Avenir Québec	Émilie Foster	15,761	45.37	+19.29
Liberal	Caroline Simard	7,871	22.66	-12.58
Parti Québécois	Nathalie Leclerc	6,012	17.31	-15.56
Québec solidaire	Jessica Crossan	4,472	12.87	+8.72
New Democratic	Andréanne Bouchard	330	0.95	-
Citoyens au pouvoir	Albert Chiasson	292	0.84	-
Total valid votes		34,738	98.29	
Total rejected ballots		605	1.71	
Turnout		35,343	68.48	
Eligible voters		51,608		

2014 Quebec general election: Jean-Lesage
Party	Candidate	Votes	%
Liberal	André Drolet	11,645	37.27
Coalition Avenir Québec	Émilie Foster	7,431	23.78
Parti Québécois	Pierre Châteauvert	6,998	22.40
Québec solidaire	Sébastien Bouchard	3,626	11.60
Option nationale	Sol Zanetti	782	2.50
Parti nul	Sébastien Dumais	384	1.23
Conservative	Andréas Garcia	77	0.24
Independent	José Breton	93	0.30
Marxist–Leninist	Claude Moreau	43	0.14
Total valid votes		31,248	98.65
Total rejected ballots		427	1.35
Turnout		31,675	68.00
Electors on the lists		46,643	–
