= Saint-Pierre-de-l'Île-d'Orléans =

- Municipality
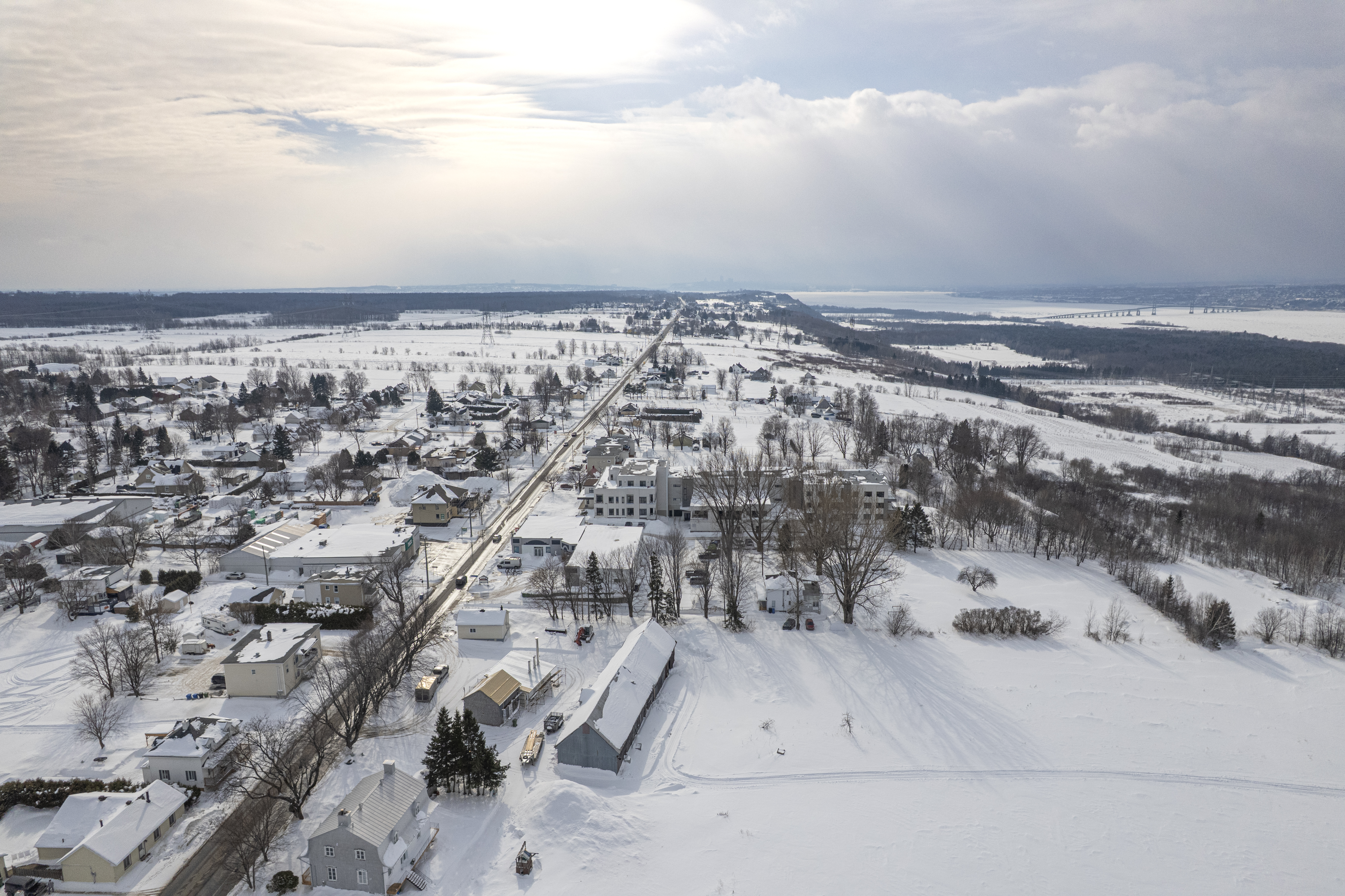

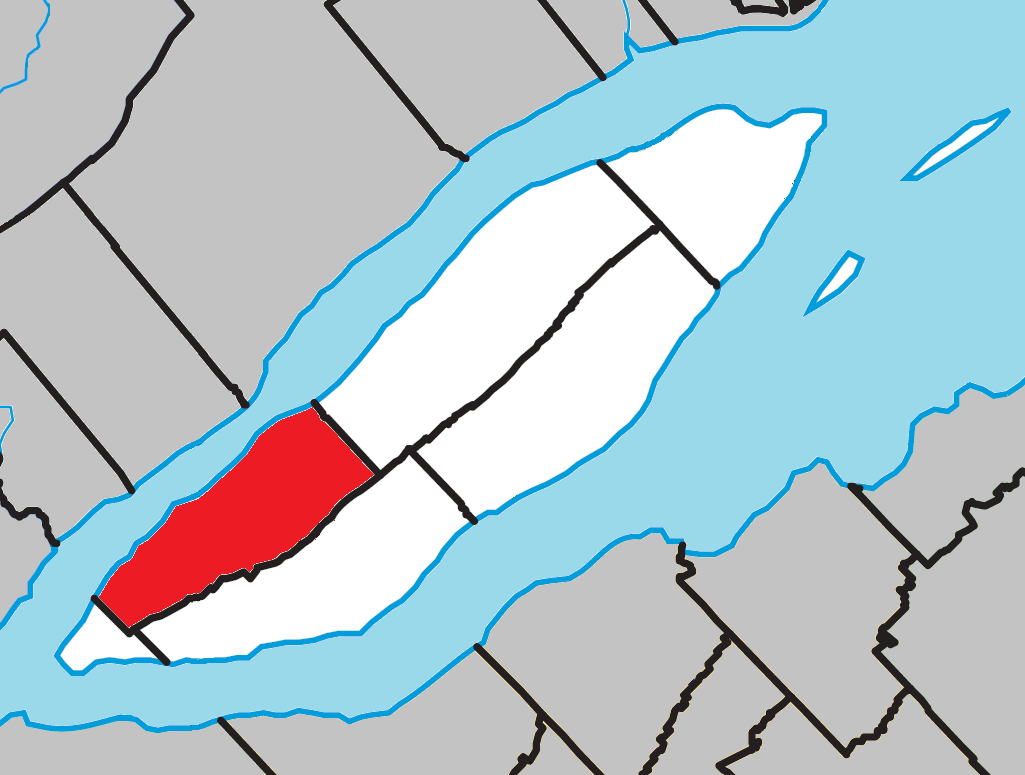
- Location within L'Île-d'Orléans RCM

- Location in central Quebec
- Coordinates: 46°53′N 71°04′W
- Country: Canada
- Province: Quebec
- Region: Capitale-Nationale
- RCM: L'Île-d'Orléans
- Settled: c. 1660
- Constituted: July 1, 1855

Government
  - Mayor: Sylvain Bergeron
  - Federal riding: Montmorency—Charlevoix
  - Prov. riding: Charlevoix–Côte-de-Beaupré

Area
  - Total: 32.20 km^{2} (12.43 sq mi)
  - Land: 31.64 km^{2} (12.22 sq mi)

Population (2021)
  - Total: 1,743
  - Density: 55.1/km^{2} (143/sq mi)
  - Pop 2016-2021: ▼12.5%
  - Dwellings: 811
- Time zone: UTC−5 (EST)
  - Summer (DST): UTC−4 (EDT)
- Postal code(s): G0A 4E0
- Area codes: 418 and 581
- Highways: R-368
- Website: st-pierre.iledorleans.com

Saint-Pierre-de-l'Île-d'Orléans (French pronunciation: [sɛ̃ pjɛʁ də lil dɔʁleɑ̃], lit. 'Saint-Pierre of the Orléans Island') is a municipality in the Capitale-Nationale region of Quebec, Canada, part of the L'Île-d'Orléans Regional County Municipality. It is situated on the west side of Orléans Island, and accessible by Quebec Route 368 and the Île d'Orléans Bridge which connects Saint-Pierre with the Beauport borough of Quebec City. Until 1997, it was known simply as Saint-Pierre.

The Quebec poet and songwriter Félix Leclerc (1914-1988) is buried in this town, having lived there from 1958 to his death.

== Geography ==
Saint-Pierre-de-l'Île-d'Orléans is located on the west side of Orléans Island, downstream from Quebec City, in the estuary of the St. Lawrence River.

Since the northern slope of the island is conducive to the cultivation of grapes, apples and berries, several agri-food companies are located there, including vineyards, orchards and cider factories, a blackcurrant liqueur factory, pick-your-own small fruit and more.

== History ==
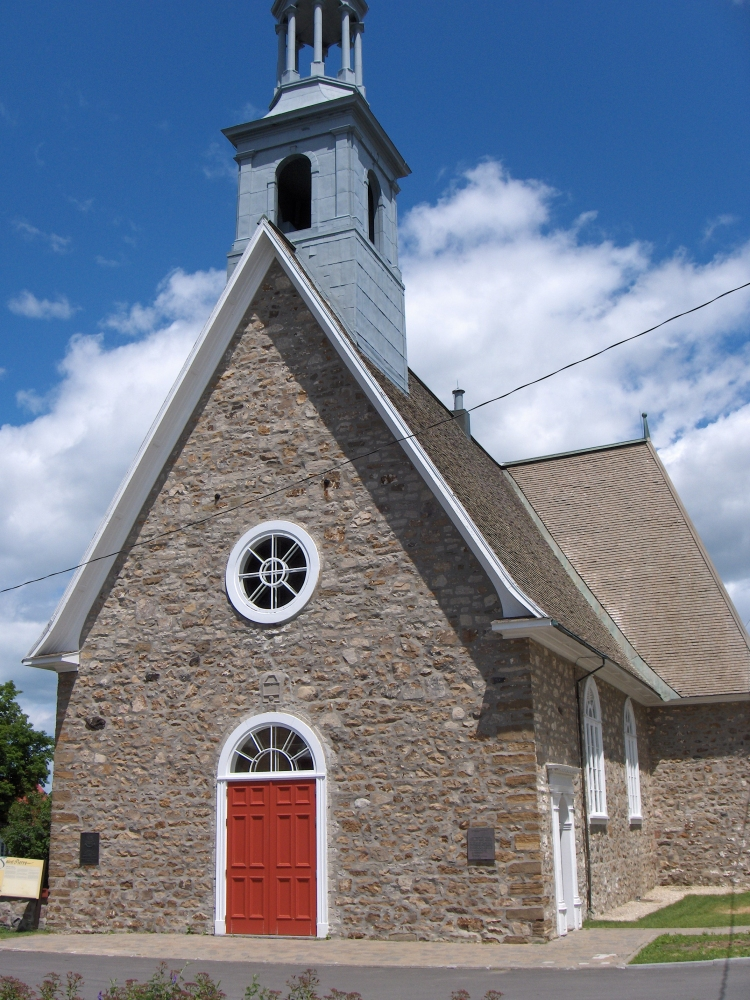
Église St-Pierre

The first European settlers came to the area around 1660. They constructed the first chapel in 1662 and by 1679 the Parish of Saint-Pierre-et-Saint-Paul was formed which at that time also included the territory of Sainte-Pétronille. Between 1716 and 1718, one of the oldest churches in Quebec was built (since 1954 classified as a historic monument and occasionally used as a concert hall). In 1722, the civil parish was established. For 54 years from 1734 to 1788, the first bishop of Quebec born in Canada, Louis-Philippe Mariauchau d'Esgly (1710-1788), served there as the resident priest.

In 1845, the Parish Municipality was formed under the name of Saint-Pierre-Isle-d'Orléans, probably in honour of Apostle Peter. It was abolished two years later in 1847 when it became part of the County Municipality, but restored again in 1855 as Saint-Pierre-et-Saint-Paul. In 1874, it lost a portion of its territory when Sainte-Pétronille separated and became a municipality. Over time, only the "Saint-Pierre" part of the name was retained.

In 1935, the Île d'Orléans Bridge was built, leading to a steady increase of residential development and making Saint-Pierre now the most populated municipality on the island. In 1997, the Parish Municipality of Saint-Pierre was renamed to Saint-Pierre-de-l'Île-d'Orléans to better distinguish the town from other namesake municipalities.

== Demographics ==
=== Population ===
Canada census – Saint-Pierre-de-l'Île-d'Orléans, Quebec community profile

| | 2021 | 2016 | 2011 |
| Population | 1,743 (-12.5% from 2016) | 1,993 (11.4% from 2011) | 1,789 (-1.5% from 2006) |
| Land area | 31.64 km^{2} (12.22 sq mi) | 31.38 km^{2} (12.12 sq mi) | 31.34 km^{2} (12.10 sq mi) |
| Population density | 55.1/km^{2} (143/sq mi) | 63.5/km^{2} (164/sq mi) | 57.1/km^{2} (148/sq mi) |
| Median age | 51.6 (M: 51.6, F: 51.6) | 48.9 (M: 48.9, F: 48.9) | 46.3 (M: 46.6, F: 45.8) |
| Private dwellings | 770 (total) | 871 (total) | 748 (total) |
| Median household income | $84,000 | $69,803 | $54,829 |

References: 2021 2016 2011

Historical Census Data - Saint-Pierre-de-l'Île-d'Orléans, Quebec

| Year | Pop. | ±% |
|---|---|---|
| 1976 | 1,416 | — |
| 1981 | 1,666 | +17.7% |
| 1986 | 1,892 | +13.6% |
| 1991 | 1,992 | +5.3% |
| 1996 | 1,982 | −0.5% |

| Year | Pop. | ±% |
|---|---|---|
| 2001 | 1,891 | −4.6% |
| 2006 | 1,816 | −4.0% |
| 2011 | 1,789 | −1.5% |
| 2016 | 1,993 | +11.4% |
| 2021 | 1,743 | −12.5% |

Source: Statistics Canada

=== Language ===
Canada Census Mother Tongue - Saint-Pierre-de-l'Île-d'Orléans, Quebec
| Census | Total | French | | | English | | | French & English | | | Other | | |
| Year | Responses | Count | Trend | Pop % | Count | Trend | Pop % | Count | Trend | Pop % | Count | Trend | Pop % |
| 2021 | 1,705 | 1,680 | ▼12.3% | 98.5% | 5 | ▼50.0% | 0.3% | 5 | 0.0% | 0.3% | 10 | 0.0% | 0.6% |
| 2016 | 1,940 | 1,915 | ▲12.0% | 98.2% | 10 | ▼33.3% | 0.5% | 5 | 0.0% | 0.3% | 10 | ▲ n/a | 0.5% |
| 2011 | 1,730 | 1,710 | ▲0.9% | 98.84% | 15 | ▲50.0% | 0.87% | 5 | ▼50.0% | 0.29% | 0 | ▼100.0% | 0.00% |
| 2006 | 1,760 | 1,695 | ▼6.4% | 96.31% | 10 | ▲ n/a% | 0.57% | 10 | ▼33.3% | 0.57% | 45 | ▲350.0% | 2.56% |
| 2001 | 1,835 | 1,810 | ▼5.7% | 98.64% | 0 | 0.0% | 0.00% | 15 | ▲ n/a% | 0.82% | 10 | 0.0% | 0.54% |
| 1996 | 1,930 | 1,920 | n/a | 99.48% | 0 | n/a | 0.00% | 0 | n/a | 0.00% | 10 | n/a | 0.52% |

== Tourism and attractions ==
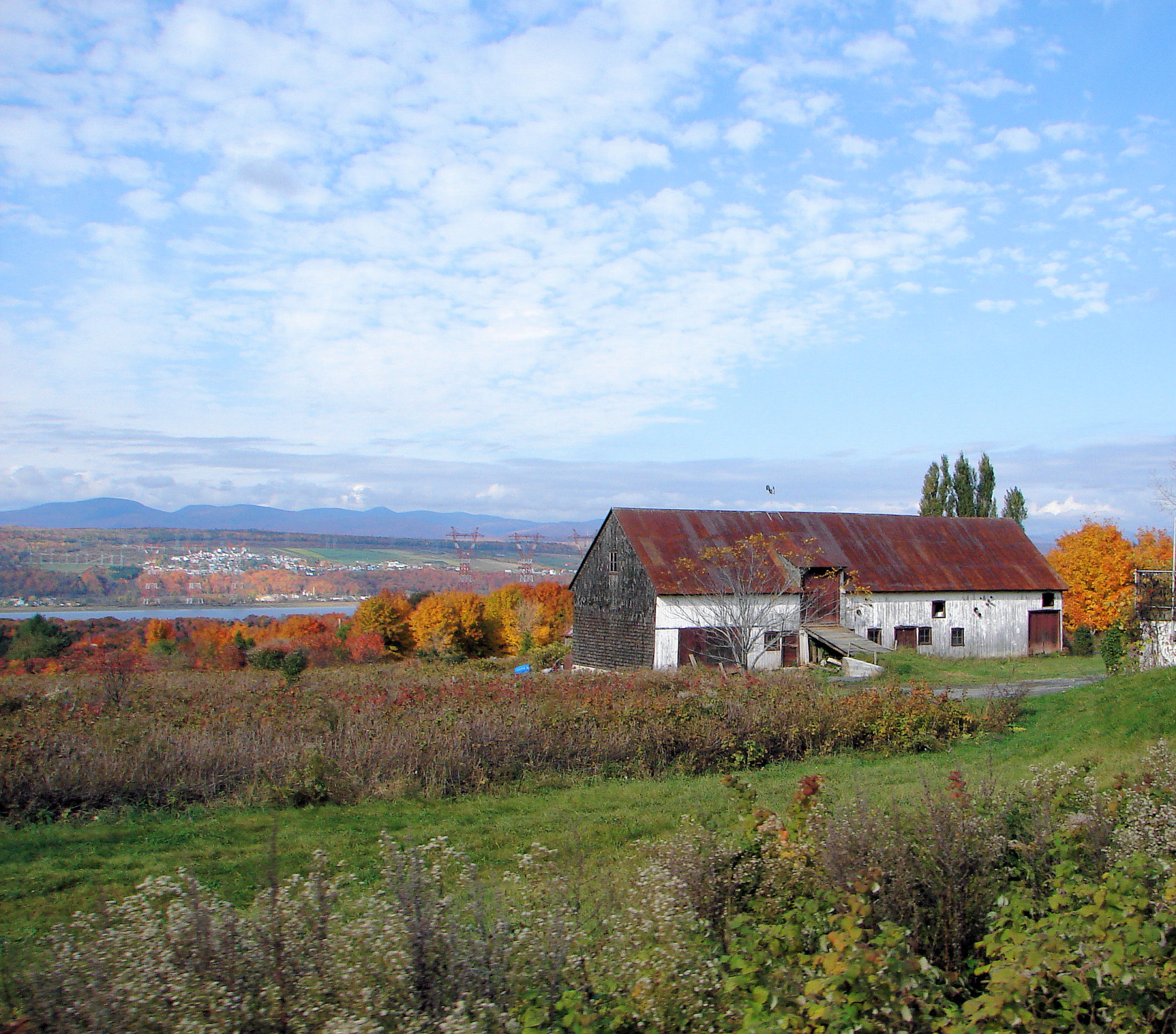
Île d'Orléans pastoral character is well preserved in Saint-Pierre.

Orleans Island, known as the "Garden of Quebec", attracts many vacationers and daytrippers with its pastoral character and cultural heritage. Since they enter the island through Saint-Pierre, it is home to many businesses catering to tourism, such as bed-and-breakfast accommodations, restaurants, art galleries, and sugar houses.

Local attractions include:

- Espace Félix-Leclerc - a museum and art gallery in a historic building dedicated to the works of poet and songwriter Félix Leclerc, as well as showcasing other Quebec folk singers
- Wineries and vineyards - offering tours and tasting local wines

== Local government ==
Saint-Pierre-de-l'Île-d'Orléans federal election results
| Year | Liberal | | Conservative | | Bloc Québécois | | New Democratic | | Green | |
|---|---|---|---|---|---|---|---|---|---|---|
| 2021 | 19% | 175 | 36% | 336 | 38% | 356 | 3% | 28 | 1% | 12 |
| 2019 | 16% | 157 | 34% | 342 | 35% | 347 | 6% | 57 | 2% | 23 |

Saint-Pierre-de-l'Île-d'Orléans provincial election results
| Year | CAQ | | Liberal | | QC solidaire | | Parti Québécois | |
|---|---|---|---|---|---|---|---|---|
| 2018 | 50% | 547 | 19% | 204 | 12% | 127 | 18% | 193 |
| 2014 | 38% | 399 | 38% | 396 | 5% | 51 | 18% | 190 |

Saint-Pierre-de-l'Île-d'Orléans forms part of the federal electoral district of Montmorency—Charlevoix and has been represented by Gabriel Hardy of the Conservative Party since 2025. Provincially, Saint-Pierre-de-l'Île-d'Orléans is part of the Charlevoix–Côte-de-Beaupré electoral district and has been represented by Kariane Bourassa of the Coalition Avenir Québec since 2022.

List of former mayors:

- Roger Deblois (2003–2009)
- Jacques Trudel (2009–2013)
- Sylvain Bergeron (2013–present)

== See also ==
- Chenal de l'Île d'Orléans
- Île d'Orléans
- List of municipalities in Quebec
