= Sylvain Lévesque =

Canadian politician

Member of the National Assembly of Quebec for Chauveau
- In office 1 October 2018 – 27 August 2026
- Preceded by: Véronyque Tremblay
- Succeeded by: Karim Elayoubi

Member of the National Assembly of Quebec for Vanier-Les Rivières
- In office 4 September 2012 – 5 March 2014
- Preceded by: Riding established
- Succeeded by: Patrick Huot

Personal details
- Born: November 30, 1973 (age 52) Lac-Mégantic, Quebec, Canada
- Party: Coalition Avenir Québec
- Occupation: Columnist

Sylvain Lévesque (born November 30, 1973, in Lac-Mégantic, Quebec) is a Canadian politician, who served as a member of the National Assembly of Quebec. First elected for the riding of Vanier-Les Rivières in the 2012 election, he was defeated in the 2014 election. He was elected to the National Assembly in the 2018 election, representing the district of Chauveau. He did not seek re-election in the 2026 general election.

Lévesque was a columnist with Le Journal de Québec publication from 2016 to 2018 where he blogged under the title "spin doctor". After being announced as a candidate for Chauveau; the Le Journal de Montreal kept his blog because his positions "can be disputable, his analyzes of political strategies are worth the detour".

== Electoral record ==
2022 Quebec general election: Chauveau
Party	Candidate	Votes	%	±%
Coalition Avenir Québec	Sylvain Lévesque	20,292	46.84	-0.22
Conservative	Éric Duhaime	13,794	31.84	+23.23
Québec solidaire	Jimena Ruiz Aragon	3,816	8.81	-1.54
Parti Québécois	Charles-Hubert Riverin	3,307	7.63	-1.57
Liberal	Igor Pivovar	1,651	3.81	-18.66
Parti nul	Renaud Blais	213	0.49	–
Climat Québec	Christine Lepage	201	0.46	–
Équipe Autonomiste	Nicolas Bouffard Savoie	44	0.10	–
Total valid votes		43,318	98.59	
Total rejected ballots		619	1.41	
Turnout		43,937	75.68	
Eligible voters		58,059		
Source(s) electionsquebec.qc.ca

2018 Quebec general election: Chauveau
Party	Candidate	Votes	%	±%
Coalition Avenir Québec	Sylvain Lévesque	18,424	47.06	+13.37
Liberal	Véronyque Tremblay	8,797	22.47	-18.9
Québec solidaire	Francis Lajoie	4,052	10.35	+6.95
Parti Québécois	Jonathan Gagnon	3,603	9.2	-6.22
Conservative	Adrien D. Pouliot	3,371	8.61	+3.69
Green	Sabir Isufi	613	1.57	
New Democratic	Mona Belleau	286	0.73	
Total valid votes		39,146	98.03	
Total rejected ballots		787	1.97	
Turnout		39,933	70.80	
Eligible voters		56,405		
Coalition Avenir Québec gain from Liberal		Swing		+16.14
Source(s) "Rapport des résultats officiels du scrutin". Élections Québec.

2014 Quebec general election: Vanier-Les Rivières
Party	Candidate	Votes	%
Liberal	Patrick Huot	18,398	43.64
Coalition Avenir Québec	Sylvain Lévesque	14,535	34.48
Parti Québécois	Marc Dean	6,337	15.03
Québec solidaire	Monique Voisine	1,920	4.55
Conservative	Jean-Alex Martin	564	1.34
Option nationale	Mathieu Fillion	400	0.95
Total valid votes		42,154	98.74
Total rejected ballots		539	1.26
Turnout		42,693	76.00
Electors on the lists		56,404	–

2012 Quebec general election: Vanier-Les Rivières
Party	Candidate	Votes	%
Coalition Avenir Québec	Sylvain Lévesque	16,333	37.92
Liberal	Patrick Huot	15,002	34.83
Parti Québécois	Marc Dean	8,038	18.66
Québec solidaire	Monique Voisine	1,371	3.18
Option nationale	Mathieu Filion	924	2.15
Green	Jean-François Morency	569	1.32
Conservative	Daniel Brisson	362	0.84
Independent	Carl Côté	322	0.75
Équipe Autonomiste	Jean-François Morency	146	0.34
Total valid votes		43,067	98.85
Total rejected ballots		504	1.15
Turnout		43,570	78.67
Electors on the lists		55,380	–
