= Mario Asselin =

Canadian politician

Member of the National Assembly of Quebec for Vanier-Les Rivières
- In office October 1, 2018 – August 27, 2026
- Preceded by: Patrick Huot
- Succeeded by: Patrick Paquet

Personal details
- Party: Coalition Avenir Québec

Mario Asselin is a Canadian politician, who was elected to the National Assembly of Quebec in the 2018 provincial election. He represented the electoral district of Vanier-Les Rivières as a member of the Coalition Avenir Québec. He did not seek re-election in the 2026 general election.

== Electoral record ==
2022 Quebec general election: Vanier-Les Rivières
Party	Candidate	Votes	%	±%
Coalition Avenir Québec	Mario Asselin	20,812	47.39	+2.29
Conservative	Donald Gagnon	8,572	19.52	+15.93
Parti Québécois	William Duquette	5,741	13.07	+3.12
Québec solidaire	Karoline Boucher	5,337	12.15	-0.06
Liberal	Karl Filion	2,760	6.28	-19.28
Independent	Mathieu Guillemette	282	0.64	–
Green	Kadidia Mahamane Bamba	266	0.61	-1.04
Climat Québec	Jean Cloutier	148	0.34	–
Total valid votes		43,918	98.86	
Total rejected ballots		506	1.14	
Turnout		44,424	73.54	
Electors on the lists		60,404		

2018 Quebec general election: Vanier-Les Rivières
Party	Candidate	Votes	%	±%
Coalition Avenir Québec	Mario Asselin	18,267	45.1	+10.62
Liberal	Patrick Huot	10,351	25.56	-18.08
Québec solidaire	Monique Voisine	4,946	12.21	+7.66
Parti Québécois	William Duquette	4,028	9.95	-5.08
Conservative	Alain Fortin	1,454	3.59	+2.25
Green	Samuel Raymond	668	1.65	
Independent	Carl Côté	299	0.74	
Parti nul	Carl-André Poliquin	245	0.60	
Citoyens au pouvoir	David Dallaire	242	0.60	
Total valid votes		40,500	98.33	
Total rejected ballots		688	1.67	
Turnout		41,188	71.82	
Eligible voters		57,345		
Coalition Avenir Québec gain from Liberal		Swing		+14.35
Source(s) "Rapport des résultats officiels du scrutin". Élections Québec.
