= Félix Leclerc =

Quebecer singer-songwriter

Félix Leclerc OC GOQ
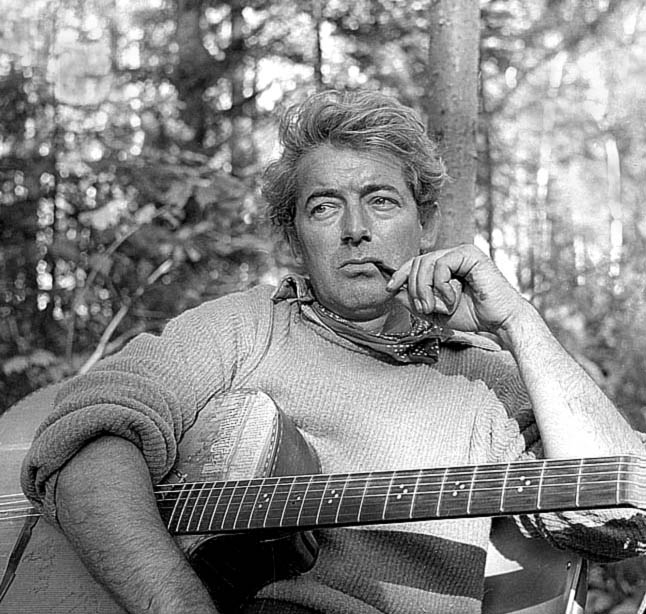
- Leclerc in July 1957

Background information
- Born: August 2, 1914; La Tuque, Quebec, Canada
- Origin: Quebec City, Quebec, Canada
- Died: August 8, 1988 (aged 74) Saint-Pierre-de-l'Île-d'Orléans, Quebec, Canada
- Labels: Polydor, Philips

Félix Leclerc OC GOQ (August 2, 1914 – August 8, 1988) was a Québécois singer-songwriter, poet, writer, actor and political activist. He was made an Officer of the Order of Canada on December 20, 1968. Leclerc was posthumously inducted into the Canadian Songwriters Hall of Fame for his songs "Moi, mes souliers", "Le P'tit Bonheur" and "Le Tour de l'île" in 2006.

== History ==
Félix Leclerc was born in La Tuque, Quebec, Canada in 1914, the sixth in a family of eleven children. He began his studies at the University of Ottawa but was forced to stop because of the Great Depression.

Leclerc worked at several jobs before becoming a radio announcer in Québec City and Trois-Rivières from 1934 to 1937. In 1939, he began working as a writer at Radio-Canada in Montreal, developing scripts for radio dramas, including Je me souviens. He performed some of his earliest songs there. He also acted in various radio dramas, including Un homme et son péché. He published a number of scripts and founded a performing company which presented plays throughout Québec.

In 1950, he was discovered by Paris impresario, Jacques Canetti, and performed in France to great success. He signed a recording contract with Polydor Records. He returned to Québec in 1953. In 1958, he received the top award of the Académie Charles Cros in France for his second album. He was invested into the Order of Canada in 1971, the National Order of Québec and became a Chevalier of the French Légion d'honneur in 1986.

Leclerc was the father of three children: the photographer and cameraman Martin Leclerc, film director Francis Leclerc and Nathalie Leclerc, general and artistic director of l’Espace Félix-Leclerc and vice-president of the Fondation Félix-Leclerc.

He died in his sleep in Saint-Pierre-de-l'Île-d'Orléans, Quebec, in 1988. A monument in his memory was constructed there in 1989. A house which he occupied from 1946 to 1967 (and where his son Martin stayed with his mother for another year) is also a museum in his honour in Vaudreuil-Dorion, west of Montréal.

Leclerc played a major role in revitalising the Québec folk song ("chanson") tradition. He also was a strong voice for Quebec nationalism.

Several parks, roads, and schools in Québec have been named in his honour. The Félix Awards, given to Quebec recording artists, are named after him. In 2000, the Government of Canada honored him with a postage stamp.

His semi-autobiographical novel Pieds nus dans l'aube was adapted by his son, filmmaker Francis Leclerc, as the 2017 film Barefoot at Dawn.

== Recordings ==
- Chante ses derniers succès sur disques (1951)
- Félix Leclerc chante (1957)
- Félix Leclerc et sa guitare (1958)
- Félix Leclerc et sa guitare Vol. 2 (1959)
- Félix Leclerc et sa guitare Vol. 3 (1959)
- Le roi heureux (1962)
- Félix Leclerc (1964)
- Mes premières chansons (1964)
- Moi mes chansons (1966)
- La vie (1967)
- L'héritage (1968)
- Mes Longs Voyages (1968)
- Félix Leclerc dit pieds nus dans l'aube (1969)
- J'inviterai l'enfance (1969)
- L'alouette en colère (1972)
- Le tour de l'île (1975)
- Mon fils (1978)
- Le bal (1979)
- Mouillures (1979)
- Prière bohémienne (1979)
- La légende du petit ours gris (1979)

== Writings ==
- Adagio (tales, 1943)
- Allegro (fables, 1944)
- Andante (poems, 1944)
- Pieds nus dans l'aube (novel, 1946)
- Dialogue d'hommes et de bêtes (theater, 1949)
- Le hamac dans les voiles (anthology, 1952)
- Moi, mes souliers (autobiography, 1955)
- Le fou de l'île (novel, 1958)
- Le calepin d'un flâneur (short texts, 1961)
- L'auberge des morts subites (theater, 1963)
- Chansons pour tes yeux (poems, 1968)
- Cent chansons (songs, 1970)
- Carcajou ou le diable des bois (novel, 1973)
- Qui est le père? (theater, 1977)
- Le petit livre bleu de Félix ou Le nouveau calepin du même flâneur (short texts, 1978)
- Rêves à vendre (poems, 1978)
- Le dernier calepin (short texts, 1988)

== See also ==
- Autoroute 40 (Autoroute Félix-Leclerc)
- Culture of Quebec
- Le train du nord
- List of musicians from Quebec
- List of French-language poets
- Music of Quebec
