= Patrick Huot =

Canadian politician

Member of the National Assembly of Quebec for Vanier-Les Rivières
- In office April 7, 2014 – August 29, 2018
- Preceded by: Sylvain Lévesque
- Succeeded by: Mario Asselin

Member of the National Assembly of Quebec for Vanier
- In office December 8, 2008 – September 4, 2012
- Preceded by: Sylvain Légaré
- Succeeded by: Sylvain Lévesque

Personal details
- Born: April 9, 1975 (age 51) Quebec City, Quebec, Canada
- Party: Liberal
- Spouse: Marie-France Boulay

Patrick Huot (born April 9, 1975) is a Canadian politician in the province of Quebec, who was elected to represent the riding of Vanier in the National Assembly of Quebec in the 2008 provincial election. He is a member of the Quebec Liberal Party.

Huot has a bachelor's degree in political sciences and a master's degree in political analysis. He was elected as a city councillor for Duberger district in Quebec City Council, and was also a member of the Youth and Municipality Commission of the Union des municipalités du Québec.
