= Patrick Paquet =

Quebec politician

Patrick Paquet MNA

Member of the National Assembly for Vanier-Les Rivières
- Incumbent
- Assumed office October 5, 2026
- Preceded by: Mario Asselin

Personal details
- Party: Conservative

Patrick Paquet is a Canadian politician who is a candidate for the National Assembly of Quebec for Vanier-Les Rivières in the 2026 Quebec general election as a member of the Conservative Party of Quebec.

== Electoral record ==
2026 Quebec general election: Vanier-Les Rivières
** Preliminary results — Not yet official **
Party	Candidate	Votes	%	±%
Conservative	Patrick Paquet	16,502	36.97	
Parti Québécois	Stéphanie Martin	10,650	23.86	
Liberal	Charles Hudon	7,520	16.85	
Coalition Avenir Québec	Françoise Faverjon-Fortin	5,727	12.83	
Québec solidaire	Karoline Boucher	3,730	8.36	
Parti nul	Marjorie Villeneuve	276	0.62	
Climat Québec	Marjolaine Pépin	172	0.39	
Démocratie directe	Kathia Poliquin	56	0.13	
Total valid votes				
Total rejected ballots				
Turnout			75.65	
Electors on the lists			–	–
Conservative gain from Coalition Avenir Québec		Swing		+
Source: Élections Québec
