= Gérard Deltell =

Canadian politician

Gérard Deltell MP
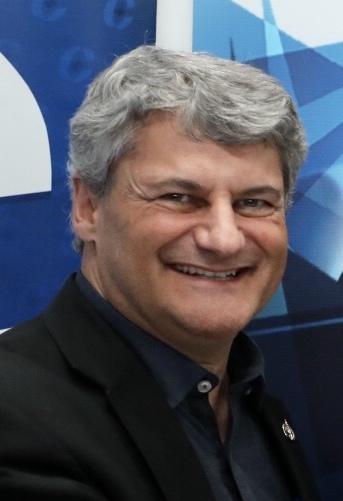
- Deltell in 2018

Opposition House Leader
- In office September 2, 2020 – February 4, 2022
- Leader: Erin O'Toole
- Preceded by: Candice Bergen
- Succeeded by: John Brassard

Leader of the Action démocratique du Québec
- In office November 19, 2009 – January 22, 2012
- Preceded by: Gilles Taillon
- Succeeded by: Party dissolved

Member of Parliament for Louis-Saint-Laurent—Akiawenhrahk Louis-Saint-Laurent (2015–2025)
- Incumbent
- Assumed office October 19, 2015
- Preceded by: Alexandrine Latendresse
- Succeeded by
Shadow cabinet posts
2026–present	Intergovernmental Affairs, One Canadian Economy and Interprovincial Trade
2025–2026	Revenue
2022–2025	Environment and Climate Change
Feb–Oct 2022	Innovation, Science and Industry
2020–2022	Opposition House Leader
2019–2020	Intergovernmental Affairs
2017–2019	Treasury Board
2016–2017	Finance
2015–2016	Employment, Labour and Workforce Development

Member of the National Assembly of Quebec for Chauveau
- In office December 8, 2008 – April 7, 2015
- Preceded by: Gilles Taillon
- Succeeded by: Véronyque Tremblay

Personal details
- Born: August 8, 1964 (age 62) Quebec City, Quebec, Canada
- Party: Conservative
- Other political affiliations: Coalition Avenir Québec; Action démocratique du Québec (2008–2012); Progressive Conservative (1980s)
- Children: Jean-Philippe, Béatrice
- Education: Université Laval
- Occupation: Politician; journalist
- Profession: Journalist

Gérard Deltell MP (born August 8, 1964) is a Canadian politician who has served as the member of Parliament (MP) for Louis-Saint-Laurent since 2015. A member of the Conservative Party, Deltell was Opposition House Leader from 2020 to 2022 under Erin O'Toole and held a number of opposition critic positions. Prior to entering federal politics, he represented Chauveau in the National Assembly of Quebec from 2008 to 2015 and was the leader of the Action démocratique du Québec (ADQ) from 2009 until it merged with the Coalition Avenir Québec (CAQ) in 2012. He served as the CAQ's house leader until 2014.

== Early life, education and career ==
Deltell was born and raised in Quebec City. He held party membership in the Progressive Conservative Party of Canada in the 1980s.

Deltell's parents are both Pied-Noirs born in Algeria at a time when this country was part of France. As his parents are French citizens Deltell also holds French citizenship by virtue of his birth (jus sanguinis). Deltell is a Spanish Catalan name, his father's family were of Spanish descent who settled in Algeria by 1840 and his maternal family's roots are both French and Italian. His parents immigrated to Canada and settled in Montreal in 1958, but relocated later in the year to Loretteville, near Quebec City. His father, Guy, served in a Moroccan regiment of the French Army of the Second World War and was awarded the French Legion of Honour on October 26, 2011.

Deltell studied social science at Cégep de Sainte-Foy, graduating in 1984. He majored in history at Université Laval and graduated in 1989. He also received training as an announcer at the Collège des annonceurs radio télévision in 1982 and at École de radio et de télévision Promédia in 1993. He received a pilot's license for ultralight aircraft in 2005.

=== Journalism career ===
Before he entered politics, Deltell worked as a TV correspondent with TQS. He also worked for the TVA and Radio-Canada stations in Quebec City, as well as the CIRO-FM radio station as a radio show host. Overall, he worked as a journalist for a total of over 20 years.

== Political career ==
=== Provincial politics ===
Deltell ran as the Action démocratique du Québec candidate in the district of Chauveau in the 2008 provincial election. He won the seat with 44% of the vote and succeeded Gilles Taillon, who ran and lost in Chapleau.

On November 19, 2009, Deltell replaced Taillon as leader of the ADQ.

During his tenure as ADQ leader, Deltell was noted as a stabilizing factor inside the party after the 2009 leadership race caused a power vacuum. He improved the fortunes of the ADQ in the polls, bringing them back to 20% in the polls. The ADQ were also polling well in the Quebec City region and other noted Conservative areas.

He ceased being leader of the ADQ upon the dissolution of the party into the new movement established by François Legault, the Coalition Avenir Québec. Deltell initially served as parliamentary leader of the CAQ caucus until the 2012 Quebec general election. From 2012 to 2014 he served as house leader for the CAQ.

=== Federal politics ===
Following much speculation, Deltell announced on April 7, 2015, that he would be running for the Conservative Party of Canada in the riding of Louis-Saint-Laurent in the upcoming federal election. His resignation as MNA for Chauveau took effect the same day. Deltell was elected MP on October 19, 2015. The Conservative Party saw a resurgence in support in the Quebec City region, with Deltell receiving credit for the party's increased support.

Since going to Ottawa, Deltell has been considered a rising star within the Conservative caucus. Opposition leader Rona Ambrose named Deltell the party's Quebec lieutenant and critic for Employment, Workforce and Labour, and he has been noted for his strong performances during Question Period. Despite being a newcomer to federal politics, Deltell was mentioned as a possible leadership candidate to replace former leader Stephen Harper. While he brushed aside the idea, Deltell received support from within the Conservative caucus to run, but he announced his support for Erin O'Toole. Globe and Mail columnist Jefferey Simpson wrote that "he ticks off a number of Conservative/conservative boxes." Deltell was a critic of the legalization of marijuana and vowed to prevent the legalization from happening. Cannabis was legalized in 2018.

Deltell was one of three Conservatives named to the membership of the Special Committee on Electoral Reform.

On October 16, 2016, Deltell was appointed Official Opposition Finance Critic by Rona Ambrose, interim leader of the Conservative Party of Canada. Conservative Leader Andrew Scheer announced his shadow cabinet on August 30, 2017, and named Deltell as critic for the Treasury Board. On September 2, 2020, Conservative leader Erin O'Toole announced that Deltell would serve as Opposition House Leader, succeeding Candice Bergen.

== Electoral record ==
=== Federal ===
2025 Canadian federal election: Louis-Saint-Laurent—Akiawenhrahk
Party	Candidate	Votes	%	±%	Expenditures
Conservative	Gérard Deltell	29,525	44.86	–7.17	$84,376.94
Liberal	Rhode-Malaure Pierre	21,693	32.96	+15.62	$6,095.81
Bloc Québécois	Martin Trudel	12,465	18.94	–1.19	$8,036.40
New Democratic	Colette Ducharme	1,607	2.44	–2.84	$0.00
People's	Anthony Leclerc	527	0.80	–1.33	$0.00
Total valid votes/expense limit		65,817	98.61	–	$137,574.21
Total rejected ballots		928	1.39		
Turnout		66,745	72.80		
Eligible voters		91,687			
Conservative notional hold		Swing		–11.40	
Source: Elections Canada
Note: number of eligible voters does not include voting day registrations.

2021 Canadian federal election: Louis-Saint-Laurent
Party	Candidate	Votes	%	±%	Expenditures
Conservative	Gérard Deltell	33,098	51.64	+6.98	$58,431.61
Bloc Québécois	Thierry Bilodeau	13,609	20.39	-1.99	$5,282.09
Liberal	Nathanielle Morin	11,228	17.52	-3.18	$13,078.75
New Democratic	Yu-Ti Eva Huang	3,370	5.26	-1.36	$305.95
People's	Guillaume Côté	1,337	2.09	-0.27	$100.00
Free	Mélanie Fortin	1,089	1.70	–	$416.51
Green	Daniel Chicoine	907	1.42	-1.87	$661.11
Total valid votes/expense limit		64,098	–	–	$123,881.08
Total rejected ballots					
Turnout			66.52	-4.06	
Registered voters		96,352			
Conservative hold		Swing		+4.49	
Source: Elections Canada

2019 Canadian federal election: Louis-Saint-Laurent
Party	Candidate	Votes	%	±%	Expenditures
Conservative	Gérard Deltell	29,279	44.66	-5.80	$47,164.29
Bloc Québécois	Jeanne-Paule Desgagnés	14,674	22.38	+12.04	$1,905.18
Liberal	Jean-Christophe Cusson	13,571	20.70	-0.72	none listed
New Democratic	Colette Amram Ducharme	4,339	6.62	-9.30	$1,469.48
Green	Sandra Mara Riedo	2,155	3.29	+1.42	$2,280.42
People's	Guillaume Côté	1,543	2.35		none listed
Total valid votes/expense limit		65,561	97.93		
Total rejected ballots		1,389	2.07		
Turnout		66,950	70.58		
Eligible voters		94,851			
Conservative hold		Swing		-17.82	
Source: Elections Canada

2015 Canadian federal election: Louis-Saint-Laurent
Party	Candidate	Votes	%	±%	Expenditures
Conservative	Gérard Deltell	32,637	50.46	+12.58	$74,381.15
Liberal	Youri Rousseau	13,852	21.42	+15.05	$26,310.43
New Democratic	G. Daniel Caron	10,296	15.92	-23.96	$48,765.46
Bloc Québécois	Ronald Sirard	6,688	10.34	-4.02	$12,115.99
Green	Michel Savard	1,210	1.87	+0.37	–
Total valid votes/Expense limit		64,683	100.0		$234,522.60
Total rejected ballots		852	–	–	
Turnout		65,535	–	–	
Eligible voters		91,332			
Conservative gain from New Democratic		Swing		+18.27	
Source: Elections Canada

=== Provincial ===
2014 Quebec general election: Chauveau
Party	Candidate	Votes	%	±%
Coalition Avenir Québec	Gérard Deltell	22,679	52.31	-0.88
Liberal	Bernard Chartier	12,940	29.84	+5.10
Parti Québécois	Christian Robitaille	5,279	12.18	-4.26
Québec solidaire	Jean-Claude Bernheim	1,717	3.96	+0.93
Conservative	Julie Plamondon	455	1.05	+0.51
Option nationale	Sophie Leblanc	289	0.67	-0.87
Total valid votes		43,269	98.72	
Total rejected ballots		560	1.28	
Turnout		43,829	76.02	
Electors on the lists		57,651	–	
Coalition Avenir Québec hold		Swing		-2.99

2012 Quebec general election: Chauveau
Party	Candidate	Votes	%	±%
Coalition Avenir Québec	Gérard Deltell	23,449	52.99	+10.47
Liberal	Marie-Ève Bédard	10,907	24.65	-9.47
Parti Québécois	Marie-Eve D'Ascola	7,247	16.38	-4.42
Québec solidaire	Sébastien Bouchard	1,337	3.02	+0.46
Option nationale	Ariane Grondin	677	1.53	
Conservative	Gaétan Roy	238	0.54	
Middle Class	Sylvain Rancourt	232	0.52	
Équipe Autonomiste	Normand Michaud	85	0.19	
Quebec Citizens' Union	Noémie Rocque	78	0.18	
Total valid votes		44,250	98.77	
Total rejected ballots		550	1.23	
Turnout		44,800	78.93	
Electors on the lists		56,759	–	
Coalition Avenir Québec notional hold		Swing		+9.97
Change is from redistributed results. CAQ change is from ADQ.

2008 Quebec general election: Chauveau
Party	Candidate	Votes	%	±%
Action démocratique	Gérard Deltell	14,029	42.75	-12.84
Liberal	Sarah Perreault	11,424	34.82	+12.47
Parti Québécois	François Aumond	6,559	19.99	+2.32
Québec solidaire	Catherine Flynn	801	2.44	+0.42
Total valid votes		32,813	100.0	
Action démocratique hold		Swing		+12.66
