= Vanier (electoral district) =

Former provincial electoral district in Quebec, Canada

Coordinates: 46.83°N 71.30°W

Quebec electoral district

Defunct provincial electoral district
- Legislature: National Assembly of Quebec
- District created: 1972
- District abolished: 2011
- First contested: 1973
- Last contested: 2008

Demographics
- Electors (2008): 55,662
- Area (km²): 54.55
- Census division: Quebec City (part)
- Census subdivision: Quebec City (part)

Vanier is a former provincial provincial electoral district in the Capitale-Nationale region of Quebec, Canada, which elected members to the National Assembly of Quebec. As of its final election, it included mostly western and central portions of Quebec City west of Quebec Autoroute 73.

It was created for the 1973 election from parts of the riding of Saint-Sauveur. Its final election was in 2008. It disappeared in the 2012 election and the successor electoral district was Vanier-Les Rivières.

== Members of the National Assembly ==
Legislature	Years	Member	Party
Riding created from Saint-Sauveur (electoral district)
30th	1973–1976	Fernand Dufour	Liberal
31st	1976–1981	Jean-François Bertrand	Parti Québécois
32nd	1981–1985	Jean-François Bertrand	Parti Québécois
33rd	1985–1989	Jean-Guy Lemieux	Liberal
34th	1989–1994	Jean-Guy Lemieux	Liberal
35th	1994–1998	Diane Barbeau	Parti Québécois
36th	1998–2003	Diane Barbeau	Parti Québécois
37th	2003–2004	Marc Bellemare	Liberal
37th	2004–2007	Sylvain Légaré	Action démocratique
38th	2007–2008	Sylvain Légaré	Action démocratique
39th	2008–2012	Patrick Huot	Liberal
Dissolved into Vanier-Les Rivières

== Election results ==
2008 Quebec general election
Party	Candidate	Votes	%	±%
Liberal	Patrick Huot	13,077	38.33	+14.14
Action démocratique	Sylvain Légaré	12,599	36.93	-14.51
Parti Québécois	Eric Boucher	7,512	22.02	+2.90
Québec solidaire	Monique Voisine	931	2.73	+0.60

2007 Quebec general election
Party	Candidate	Votes	%	±%
Action démocratique	Sylvain Légaré	20,699	51.44	
Liberal	Jean-Claude L'Abbée	9,733	24.19	
Parti Québécois	Sylvain Lévesque	7,694	19.12	
Green	Lucien Gravelle	1,149	2.86	–
Québec solidaire	Marie Dionne	859	2.13	
Christian Democracy	Louis Casgrain	103	0.26	

== See also ==
- List of Quebec provincial electoral districts
- Canadian provincial electoral districts
