= Vanier-Les Rivières =

Provincial electoral district in Quebec, Canada

Coordinates: 46.83°N 71.30°W

Quebec electoral district
- Location in Quebec

Provincial electoral district
- Legislature: National Assembly of Quebec
MNA
Patrick Paquet
Conservative
- District created: 2011
- First contested: 2012
- Last contested: 2026

Demographics
- Electors (2014): 56,404
- Area (km²): 49.0
- Census division: Quebec City (part)
- Census subdivision: Quebec City (part)

Vanier-Les Rivières (French pronunciation: [vanje le ʁivjɛʁ]) is a provincial electoral district in the Capitale-Nationale region of Quebec, Canada, that elects members to the National Assembly of Quebec. It consists of the entire territory of the Les Rivières borough of Quebec City.

It was created for the 2012 election from a light modification to the former Vanier electoral district.

In 2026, it lost its territory in the Des Châtels neighbourhood and the Place-Duclos neighbourhood.

== Members of the National Assembly ==
Legislature	Years	Member	Party
Riding created from Vanier
40th	2012–2014	Sylvain Lévesque	Coalition Avenir Québec
41st	2014–2018	Patrick Huot	Liberal
42nd	2018–2022	Mario Asselin	Coalition Avenir Québec
43rd	2022–2026	Mario Asselin	Coalition Avenir Québec
44th	2026–Present	Patrick Paquet	Conservative

== Election results ==
2026 Quebec general election
** Preliminary results — Not yet official **
Party	Candidate	Votes	%	±%
Conservative	Patrick Paquet	16,502	36.97	
Parti Québécois	Stéphanie Martin	10,650	23.86	
Liberal	Charles Hudon	7,520	16.85	
Coalition Avenir Québec	Françoise Faverjon-Fortin	5,727	12.83	
Québec solidaire	Karoline Boucher	3,730	8.36	
Parti nul	Marjorie Villeneuve	276	0.62	
Climat Québec	Marjolaine Pépin	172	0.39	
Démocratie directe	Kathia Poliquin	56	0.13	
Total valid votes				
Total rejected ballots				
Turnout			75.65	
Electors on the lists			–	–
Conservative gain from Coalition Avenir Québec		Swing		+
Source: Élections Québec

2022 Quebec general election redistributed results
Party	Vote	%
Coalition Avenir Québec	19,224	47.91
Conservative	7,714	19.23
Parti Québécois	5,283	13.17
Québec solidaire	4,771	11.89
Liberal	2,506	6.25
Others	625	1.56

2022 Quebec general election
Party	Candidate	Votes	%	±%
Coalition Avenir Québec	Mario Asselin	20,812	47.39	+2.29
Conservative	Donald Gagnon	8,572	19.52	+15.93
Parti Québécois	William Duquette	5,741	13.07	+3.12
Québec solidaire	Karoline Boucher	5,337	12.15	-0.06
Liberal	Karl Filion	2,760	6.28	-19.28
Independent	Mathieu Guillemette	282	0.64	–
Green	Kadidia Mahamane Bamba	266	0.61	-1.04
Climat Québec	Jean Cloutier	148	0.34	–
Total valid votes		43,918	98.86	
Total rejected ballots		506	1.14	
Turnout		44,424	73.54	
Electors on the lists		60,404		

2018 Quebec general election
Party	Candidate	Votes	%	±%
Coalition Avenir Québec	Mario Asselin	18,267	45.1	+10.62
Liberal	Patrick Huot	10,351	25.56	-18.08
Québec solidaire	Monique Voisine	4,946	12.21	+7.66
Parti Québécois	William Duquette	4,028	9.95	-5.08
Conservative	Alain Fortin	1,454	3.59	+2.25
Green	Samuel Raymond	668	1.65	
Independent	Carl Côté	299	0.74	
Parti nul	Carl-André Poliquin	245	0.60	
Citoyens au pouvoir	David Dallaire	242	0.60	
Total valid votes		40,500	98.33	
Total rejected ballots		688	1.67	
Turnout		41,188	71.82	
Eligible voters		57,345		
Coalition Avenir Québec gain from Liberal		Swing		+14.35
Source(s) "Rapport des résultats officiels du scrutin". Élections Québec.

2014 Quebec general election
Party	Candidate	Votes	%
Liberal	Patrick Huot	18,398	43.64
Coalition Avenir Québec	Sylvain Lévesque	14,535	34.48
Parti Québécois	Marc Dean	6,337	15.03
Québec solidaire	Monique Voisine	1,920	4.55
Conservative	Jean-Alex Martin	564	1.34
Option nationale	Mathieu Fillion	400	0.95
Total valid votes		42,154	98.74
Total rejected ballots		539	1.26
Turnout		42,693	76.00
Electors on the lists		56,404	–

2012 Quebec general election
Party	Candidate	Votes	%
Coalition Avenir Québec	Sylvain Lévesque	16,333	37.92
Liberal	Patrick Huot	15,002	34.83
Parti Québécois	Marc Dean	8,038	18.66
Québec solidaire	Monique Voisine	1,371	3.18
Option nationale	Mathieu Filion	924	2.15
Green	Jean-François Morency	569	1.32
Conservative	Daniel Brisson	362	0.84
Independent	Carl Côté	322	0.75
Équipe Autonomiste	Jean-François Morency	146	0.34
Total valid votes		43,067	98.85
Total rejected ballots		504	1.15
Turnout		43,570	78.67
Electors on the lists		55,380	–

== See also ==
- List of Quebec provincial electoral districts
- Canadian provincial electoral districts
