= Diane Barbeau =

Canadian politician

Member of the National Assembly of Quebec for Vanier
- In office September 12, 1994 – April 14, 2003
- Preceded by: Jean-Guy Lemieux
- Succeeded by: Marc Bellemare

Personal details
- Born: March 23, 1961 Hauterive, Quebec
- Died: November 6, 2021 (aged 60) Quebec City
- Party: Parti Québécois

Diane Barbeau (March 23, 1961 – November 6, 2021) was a Quebec politician. She represented Vanier in the National Assembly of Quebec from 1994 to 2003, as a member of the Parti Québécois (PQ).

Barbeau worked as an aide to François Beaulne, the PQ member for Bertrand.

She ran for the Parti Québécois in the open seat of Vanier in the 1994, she easily won the seat by almost double the votes than her opponent and was re-elected in the 1998 election.

Barbeau served in the government of Lucien Bouchard as a Deputy Whip and as a Parliamentary Secretary to the Minister of Social Solidarity from January 27, 1999 to March 8, 2001 when Bernard Landry took over as Premier. She served in his government as Parliamentary Secretary to the Minister of Employment and Social Solidarity, from 2001 until 2002, and then for the Minister of State for Human Resources until the end of the government.

She abruptly ended her political career in 2003, a month before that year's elections were called, after she was diagnosed with kidney cancer while pregnant, forcing an early birth a month later and eventually leading to the loss of both kidneys.
