= Caroline Simard =

Canadian politician

Caroline Simard MNA
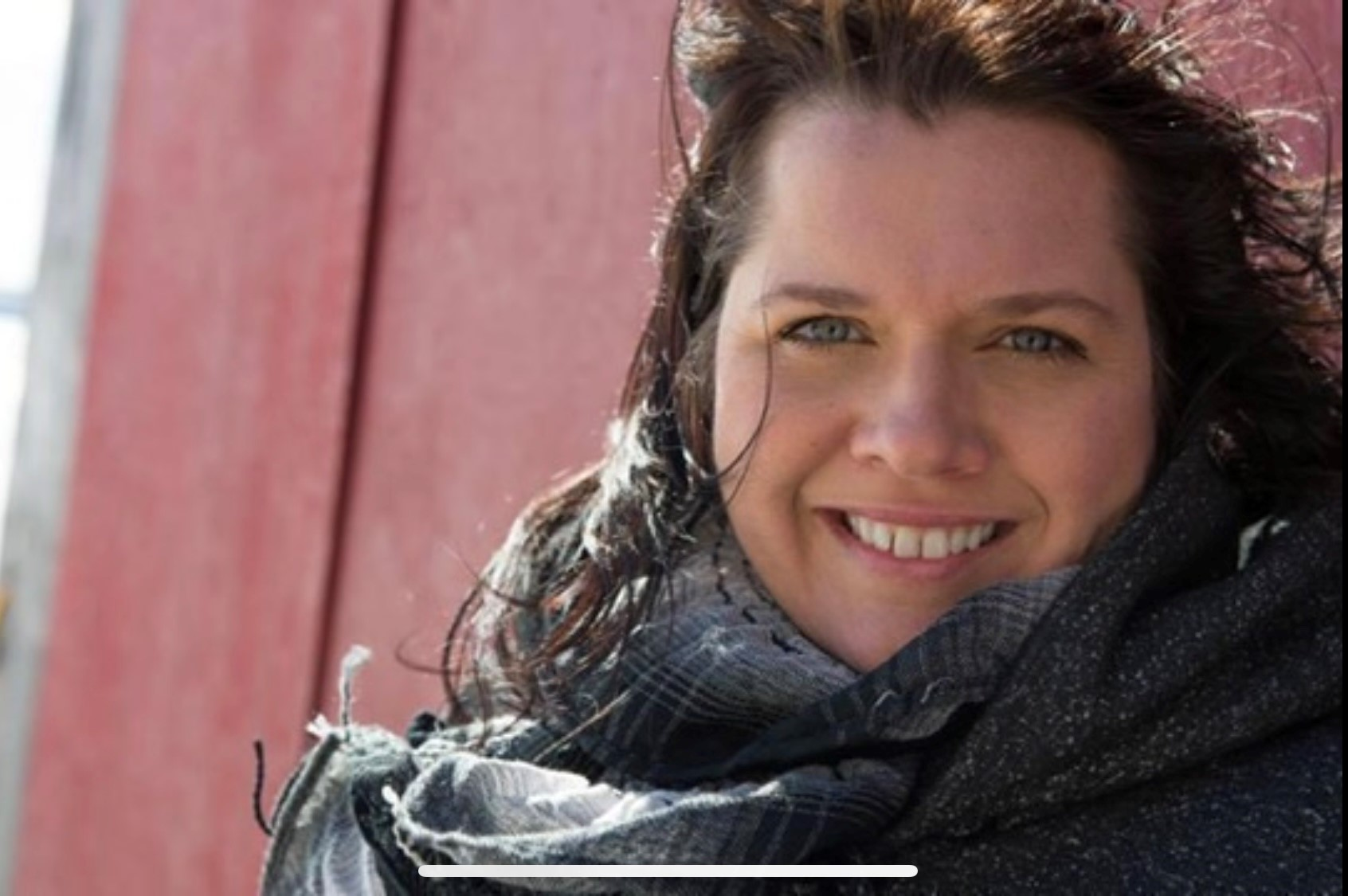
- Simard in 2024

Member of the National Assembly for Charlevoix–Côte-de-Beaupré
- Incumbent
- Assumed office October 5, 2026
- Preceded by: Kariane Bourassa
- In office April 7, 2014 – August 29, 2018
- Preceded by: Pauline Marois
- Succeeded by: Émilie Foster

Personal details
- Born: 1974 (age 51–52) Baie-Saint-Paul, Quebec, Canada
- Party: Conservative
- Other political affiliations: Liberal (until 2026)
- Education: Collège François-Xavier-Garneau (DCS); Université de Sherbrooke (BA)

Caroline Simard (born 1974) is a Canadian politician in Quebec. She was the Member of the National Assembly for Charlevoix–Côte-de-Beaupré from 2014 to 2018 as a member of the Quebec Liberal Party. Simard is now a member of the Conservative Party of Quebec and is running again in Charlevoix–Côte-de-Beaupré in the 2026 Quebec general election.

== Political career ==
Simard's candidacy in the 2014 Quebec election was her first time running for public office. Although she was sometimes accused during the campaign of being the Quebec Liberal Party's paper candidate in Charlevoix–Côte-de-Beaupré, she defeated incumbent Premier Pauline Marois by 882 votes. Upon taking office, Simard was disappointed to discover that the staff of the former Premier had emptied Marois' constituency offices in the riding of all files, forcing Simard's staff to start from zero recreating files on local issues.

== Personal life ==
Simard is originally from Baie-Saint-Paul. She obtained her DCS from the Collège François-Xavier-Garneau in Quebec City, and graduated with a B.A. in French language studies (writing and communication) at the Université de Sherbrooke.

Prior to her election to the legislature, Simard worked in marketing research. She started her professional career at Statistics Canada in 1996. After periods working at Tenor Marketing in Sherbrooke, Léger Marketing in Montreal and the Impact-Recherche division of Groupe Cossette Communication in Quebec City, she started her own firm, Doxa Focus, in December 2006.
