= François-Eugène Mathieu =

Canadian politician

Member of the Legislative Assembly of Quebec for Chauveau
- In office 1966–1970
- Preceded by: District created in 1965
- Succeeded by: André Harvey

Personal details
- Born: March 11, 1908 L'Ange-Gardien, Quebec, Canada
- Died: June 13, 1992 (aged 84) Sillery, Quebec, Canada
- Party: Union Nationale

François-Eugène Mathieu (March 11, 1908 – June 13, 1992) was a Canadian politician and a Member of the Legislative Assembly of Quebec.

Mathieu was born on March 11, 1908, in L'Ange-Gardien in the Greater Quebec City Area and became an accountant. He was married to Lucienne Laberge in 1934.

Mathieu served as Mayor of Charlesbourg from 1950 to 1953 and of Charlesbourg-Ouest from 1953 to 1969. He ran as a Union Nationale candidate to the Legislative Assembly of Quebec in the provincial district of Chauveau in the 1966 election. He was appointed to the Cabinet in the same year and served as Minister without Portfolio until his defeat against Liberal candidate André Harvey in the 1970 election.

Mathieu died on June 13, 1992, in Sillery.
