= Karim Elayoubi =

Canadian politician

Karim Elayoubi MNA

Member of the National Assembly for Chauveau
- Incumbent
- Assumed office October 5, 2026
- Preceded by: Sylvain Lévesque

Personal details
- Party: Conservative

Karim Elayoubi is a Canadian politician who is a candidate for the National Assembly of Quebec for Chauveau in the 2026 Quebec general election as a member of the Conservative Party of Quebec.
