= Charlevoix–Côte-de-Beaupré =

Provincial electoral district in Quebec, Canada

Quebec electoral district

Provincial electoral district
- Legislature: National Assembly of Quebec
MNA
Caroline Simard
Conservative
- District created: 2011
- First contested: 2012
- Last contested: 2026

Demographics
- Population (2011): 62,460
- Electors (2012): 50,662
- Area (km²): 12,848.2
- Pop. density (per km²): 4.9
- Census division(s): L'Île-d'Orléans, La Côte-de-Beaupré, Charlevoix, Charlevoix-Est
- Census subdivision(s): Baie-Sainte-Catherine, Baie-Saint-Paul, Beaupré, Boischatel, Château-Richer, Clermont, La Malbaie, L'Ange-Gardien, Les Éboulements, L'Isle-aux-Coudres, Notre-Dame-des-Monts, Petite-Rivière-Saint-François, Saint-Aimé-des-Lacs, Sainte-Anne-de-Beaupré, Sainte-Famille-de-l'Île-d'Orléans, Saint-Ferréol-les-Neiges, Saint-François-de-l'Île-d'Orléans, Saint-Hilarion, Saint-Irénée, Saint-Jean-de-l'Île-d'Orléans, Saint-Joachim, Saint-Laurent-de-l'Île-d'Orléans, Saint-Louis-de-Gonzague-du-Cap-Tourmente, Sainte-Pétronille, Saint-Pierre-de-l'Île-d'Orléans, Saint-Siméon, Saint-Tite-des-Caps, Saint-Urbain; Lac-Jacques-Cartier, Lac-Pikauba, Mont-Élie, Sagard, Sault-au-Cochon

Charlevoix–Côte-de-Beaupré (French pronunciation: [ʃaʁləvwa kot də bopʁe]) is a provincial electoral district in the Capitale-Nationale region of Quebec, Canada, that elects members to the National Assembly of Quebec. It consists of the entire territory of the following regional county municipalities: L'Île-d'Orléans, La Côte-de-Beaupré, Charlevoix, Charlevoix-Est. It notably includes the municipalities of La Malbaie, Boischatel, Baie-Saint-Paul, L'Ange-Gardien, Château-Richer, Beaupré, Saint-Ferréol-les-Neiges, and Clermont.

It was created for the 2012 election by combining the entire former Charlevoix electoral district with most of the territory (though not most of the population) of the Montmorency electoral district, along with the part of the unorganized territory of Lac-Jacques-Cartier that Charlevoix did not already have, which was taken from Chauveau electoral district.

== Members of the National Assembly ==
Legislature	Years	Member	Party
Riding created from Charlevoix, Montmorency and Chauveau
40th	2012–2014	Pauline Marois	Parti Québécois
41st	2014–2018	Caroline Simard	Liberal
42nd	2018–2022	Émilie Foster	Coalition Avenir Québec
43rd	2022–2026	Kariane Bourassa	Coalition Avenir Québec
44th	2026–Present	Caroline Simard	Conservative

== Election results ==
2026 Quebec general election
** Preliminary results — Not yet official **
Party	Candidate	Votes	%	±%
Conservative	Caroline Simard	15,997	38.99	+20.87
Parti Québécois	François Gariépy	10,506	25.60	+9.41
Coalition Avenir Québec	Kariane Bourassa	7,287	17.76	–30.41
Québec solidaire	Dulce Vivar	3,778	9.21	–3.32
Liberal	Michel Bureau	3,260	7.95	+3.25
Démocratie directe	James Collins	124	0.30	+0.02
Parti accès propriété et équité	Mario Desjardins Pelchat	80	0.19	N/A
Total valid votes		41,032	98.88	+0.02
Total rejected ballots		466	1.12	–0.02
Turnout		41,498	74.04	+3.84
Electors on the lists		56,046		
Conservative gain from Coalition Avenir Québec		Swing		+5.73
Source: Élections Québec

2022 Quebec general election
Party	Candidate	Votes	%	±%
Coalition Avenir Québec	Kariane Bourassa	17,979	48.17	+2.80
Conservative	Odré Lacombe	6,763	18.12	New
Parti Québécois	Lucien Rodrigue	6,041	16.19	–1.12
Québec solidaire	Myriam Fortin	4,677	12.53	–0.34
Liberal	Michel Bureau	1,756	4.70	–17.96
Démocratie directe	Stefany Tremblay	106	0.28	New
Total valid votes		37,322	98.86	
Total rejected ballots		430	1.14	–0.57
Turnout		37,752	70.20	+1.72
Electors on the lists		53,780		
Coalition Avenir Québec hold		Swing		–7.66
Source: Élections Québec

2018 Quebec general election
Party	Candidate	Votes	%	±%
Coalition Avenir Québec	Émilie Foster	15,761	45.37	+19.29
Liberal	Caroline Simard	7,871	22.66	-12.58
Parti Québécois	Nathalie Leclerc	6,012	17.31	-15.56
Québec solidaire	Jessica Crossan	4,472	12.87	+8.72
New Democratic	Andréanne Bouchard	330	0.95	
Citoyens au pouvoir	Albert Chiasson	292	0.84	
Total valid votes		34,738	98.29	
Total rejected ballots		605	1.71	
Turnout		35,343	68.48	
Eligible voters		51,608		
Coalition Avenir Québec gain from Liberal		Swing		+15.94
Source(s) "Rapport des résultats officiels du scrutin". Élections Québec.

2014 Quebec general election
Party	Candidate	Votes	%	±%
Liberal	Caroline Simard	13,083	35.24	+8.18
Parti Québécois	Pauline Marois	12,201	32.87	-7.78
Coalition Avenir Québec	Ian Latrémouille	9,682	26.08	-0.72
Québec solidaire	Jean-Yves Bernard	1,539	4.15	+0.93
Conservative	Chantal Mélançon	332	0.89	–
Option nationale	François Thériault	287	0.77	-0.86
Total valid votes		37,124	98.74	–
Total rejected ballots		472	1.26	–
Turnout		37,596	73.48	-2.47
Electors on the lists		51,165	–	–
Liberal gain from Parti Québécois		Swing		+7.98

2012 Quebec general election
Party	Candidate	Votes	%
Parti Québécois	Pauline Marois	15,472	40.65
Liberal	Claire Rémillard	10,301	27.06
Coalition Avenir Québec	Ian Latrémouille	10,203	26.80
Québec solidaire	André Jacob	1,227	3.22
Option nationale	Pierre Tremblay	619	1.63
Coalition pour la constituante	Daniel Laforest	243	0.64
Total valid votes		38,065	98.82
Total rejected ballots		456	1.18
Turnout		38,521	75.95
Electors on the lists		50,717	–

== See also ==
- List of Quebec provincial electoral districts
- Canadian provincial electoral districts
