= Chauveau (electoral district) =

Provincial electoral district in Quebec, Canada

Coordinates: 47.165°N 71.442°W

Quebec electoral district

Provincial electoral district
- Legislature: National Assembly of Quebec
MNA
Karim Elayoubi
Conservative
- District created: 1965
- First contested: 1966
- Last contested: 2026

Demographics
- Population (2006): 66,441
- Electors (2014): 57,651
- Area (km²): 2,644.0
- Pop. density (per km²): 25.1
- Census division(s): Quebec City (part), La Jacques-Cartier (part)
- Census subdivision(s): Quebec City (part), Lac-Beauport, Lac-Delage, Stoneham-et-Tewkesbury; Wendake; Lac-Croche

Chauveau (French pronunciation: [ʃovo]) is a provincial electoral district in the Capitale-Nationale region of Quebec, Canada. It includes portions of the Charlesbourg and La Haute-Saint-Charles boroughs of Quebec City and the eastern portion of the La Jacques-Cartier Regional County Municipality.

It was created for the 1966 election from part of Québec-Comté electoral district.

In the change from the 2001 to the 2011 electoral map, it lost Saint-Gabriel-de-Valcartier to La Peltrie and the unorganized territory of Lac-Jacques-Cartier to Charlevoix–Côte-de-Beaupré.

In the change from the 2011 to the 2018 electoral map, the riding will lose some territory (roughly the area between Rivère des Roches to Rue George-Muir) to Charlesbourg.

It is named after the first Premier of Quebec, Pierre-Joseph-Olivier Chauveau who was in power from 1867 to 1873.

== Members of the Legislative Assembly / National Assembly ==
Legislature	Years	Member	Party
Riding created from Québec-Comté
28th	1966–1970	François-Eugène Mathieu	Union Nationale
29th	1970–1973	André Harvey	Liberal
30th	1973–1976	Bernard Lachapelle	Liberal
31st	1976–1981	Louis O'Neill	Parti Québécois
32nd	1981–1985	Raymond Brouillet	Parti Québécois
33rd	1985–1989	Rémy Poulin	Liberal
34th	1989–1994	Rémy Poulin	Liberal
35th	1994–1998	Raymond Brouillet	Parti Québécois
36th	1998–2003	Raymond Brouillet	Parti Québécois
37th	2003–2007	Sarah Perreault	Liberal
38th	2007–2008	Gilles Taillon	Action démocratique
39th	2008–2012	Gérard Deltell	Action démocratique
39th	2012–2012	Gérard Deltell	Coalition Avenir Québec
40th	2012–2014	Gérard Deltell	Coalition Avenir Québec
41st	2014–2015	Gérard Deltell	Coalition Avenir Québec
41st	2015–2018	Véronyque Tremblay	Liberal
42nd	2018–2022	Sylvain Lévesque	Coalition Avenir Québec
43rd	2022–2026	Sylvain Lévesque	Coalition Avenir Québec
44th	2026–Present	Karim Elayoubi	Conservative

== Election results ==
2026 Quebec general election
** Preliminary results — Not yet official **
Party	Candidate	Votes	%	±%
Conservative	Karim Elayoubi	22,026	47.88	+16.04
Parti Québécois	Mathieu Foltz	9,474	20.59	+12.96
Liberal	John McGrath	5,825	12.66	+8.85
Coalition Avenir Québec	Christian Lachance	4,497	9.77	–37.07
Québec solidaire	Émilie Couture	3,860	8.39	–0.42
Parti nul	William Beaudry	325	0.71	+0.22
Total valid votes		46,007	98.87	+0.28
Total rejected ballots		526	1.13	–0.28
Turnout		46,533	77.52	+1.84
Electors on the lists		60,028		
Conservative gain from Coalition Avenir Québec		Swing		+1.54
Source: Élections Québec

2022 Quebec general election
Party	Candidate	Votes	%	±%
Coalition Avenir Québec	Sylvain Lévesque	20,292	46.84	-0.22
Conservative	Éric Duhaime	13,794	31.84	+23.23
Québec solidaire	Jimena Ruiz Aragon	3,816	8.81	-1.54
Parti Québécois	Charles-Hubert Riverin	3,307	7.63	-1.57
Liberal	Igor Pivovar	1,651	3.81	-18.66
Parti nul	Renaud Blais	213	0.49	–
Climat Québec	Christine Lepage	201	0.46	–
Équipe Autonomiste	Nicolas Bouffard Savoie	44	0.10	–
Total valid votes		43,318	98.59	
Total rejected ballots		619	1.41	
Turnout		43,937	75.68	
Eligible voters		58,059		
Source(s) electionsquebec.qc.ca

2018 Quebec general election
Party	Candidate	Votes	%	±%
Coalition Avenir Québec	Sylvain Lévesque	18,424	47.06	+13.37
Liberal	Véronyque Tremblay	8,797	22.47	-18.9
Québec solidaire	Francis Lajoie	4,052	10.35	+6.95
Parti Québécois	Jonathan Gagnon	3,603	9.2	-6.22
Conservative	Adrien D. Pouliot	3,371	8.61	+3.69
Green	Sabir Isufi	613	1.57	
New Democratic	Mona Belleau	286	0.73	
Total valid votes		39,146	98.03	
Total rejected ballots		787	1.97	
Turnout		39,933	70.80	
Eligible voters		56,405		
Coalition Avenir Québec gain from Liberal		Swing		+16.14
Source(s) "Rapport des résultats officiels du scrutin". Élections Québec.

Quebec provincial by-election, June 8, 2015 Resignation of Gérard Deltell
Party	Candidate	Votes	%	±%
Liberal	Véronyque Tremblay	10,385	41.37	+11.53
Coalition Avenir Québec	Jocelyne Cazin	8,456	33.69	-18.62
Parti Québécois	Sébastien Couture	3,870	15.42	+3.24
Conservative	Adrien D. Pouliot	1,236	4.92	+3.87
Québec solidaire	Marjolaine Bouchard	854	3.40	-0.56
Parti des sans Parti	Frank Malenfant	142	0.57	–
Option nationale	Stéphanie Grimard	125	0.50	-0.17
Équipe Autonomiste	Manuel Mathieu	34	0.14	–
Total valid votes		25,102	99.12	
Total rejected ballots		222	0.88	-0.40
Turnout		25,324	43.29	-32.89
Electors on the lists		58,501	–	
Liberal gain from Coalition Avenir Québec		Swing		+15.07

2014 Quebec general election
Party	Candidate	Votes	%	±%
Coalition Avenir Québec	Gérard Deltell	22,679	52.31	-0.88
Liberal	Bernard Chartier	12,940	29.84	+5.10
Parti Québécois	Christian Robitaille	5,279	12.18	-4.26
Québec solidaire	Jean-Claude Bernheim	1,717	3.96	+0.93
Conservative	Julie Plamondon	455	1.05	+0.51
Option nationale	Sophie Leblanc	289	0.67	-0.87
Total valid votes		43,359	98.72	
Total rejected ballots		560	1.28	
Turnout		43,919	76.18	
Electors on the lists		57,651	–	
Coalition Avenir Québec hold		Swing		-2.99

2012 Quebec general election
Party	Candidate	Votes	%	±%
Coalition Avenir Québec	Gérard Deltell	23,449	52.99	+10.47
Liberal	Marie-Ève Bédard	10,907	24.65	-9.47
Parti Québécois	Marie-Eve D'Ascola	7,247	16.38	-4.42
Québec solidaire	Sébastien Bouchard	1,337	3.02	+0.46
Option nationale	Ariane Grondin	677	1.53	
Conservative	Gaétan Roy	238	0.54	
Middle Class	Sylvain Rancourt	232	0.52	
Équipe Autonomiste	Normand Michaud	85	0.19	
Quebec Citizens' Union	Noémie Rocque	78	0.18	
Total valid votes		44,250	98.77	
Total rejected ballots		550	1.23	
Turnout		44,800	78.93	
Electors on the lists		56,759	–	
Coalition Avenir Québec notional hold		Swing		+9.97

^ Change is from redistributed results. CAQ change is from ADQ.

2008 Quebec general election redistributed results
Party	Vote	%
Action démocratique	13,990	42.52
Liberal	11,225	34.12
Parti Québécois	6,843	20.80
Québec solidaire	842	2.56

2008 Quebec general election
Party	Candidate	Votes	%	±%
Action démocratique	Gérard Deltell	14,029	42.75	-12.84
Liberal	Sarah Perreault	11,424	34.82	+12.47
Parti Québécois	François Aumond	6,559	19.99	+2.32
Québec solidaire	Catherine Flynn	801	2.44	+0.42
Total valid votes		32,813	100.0	
Action démocratique hold		Swing		+12.66

2007 Quebec general election
Party	Candidate	Votes	%	±%
Action démocratique	Gilles Taillon	22,013	55.59	+21.52
Liberal	Sarah Perreault	8,849	22.35	-17.75
Parti Québécois	Robert Miller	6,680	16.87	-6.22
Green	Mathilde Lavoie Morency	1,255	3.17	-
Québec solidaire	Nathalie Brochu	800	2.02	+0.97*

* Increase is from UFP

2003 Quebec general election
Party	Candidate	Votes	%	±%
Liberal	Sarah Perreault	14,774	40.10	+2.76
Action démocratique	Hélène Napert	12,555	34.07	+16.44
Parti Québécois	Nathalie Samson	8,506	23.09	-20.33
No designation	Christian Légaré	624	1.69	-
UFP	Marie-Noëlle Béland	387	1.05	-

1998 Quebec general election
Party	Candidate	Votes	%
Parti Québécois	Raymond Brouillet	20,204	43.42
Liberal	Hélène McLean	17,374	37.34
Action démocratique	Martin Valois	8,203	17.63
Socialist Democracy	Josée Larouche	519	1.12
Natural Law	Lisette Proulx	235	0.50
Total valid votes		46,535	98.91
Total rejected ballots		515	1.09
Turnout		47,050	78.60
Electors on the lists		59,862	–

1995 Quebec referendum
Side	Votes	%
Oui	28,574	54.50
Non	23,855	45.50

1994 Quebec general election
Party	Candidate	Votes	%
Parti Québécois	Raymond Brouillet	20,106	46.52
Liberal	Rémy Poulin	17,374	37.34
Action démocratique	Gérard Sénécal	5,427	12.56
Independent	Maurice Allard	2,229	5.16
Independent	Jocelyn Boudreau	1,052	2.44
Natural Law	Lisette Proulx	596	1.38
Total valid votes		43,197	97.94
Total rejected ballots		908	2.06
Turnout		44,105	81.15
Electors on the lists		54,351	–

1992 Charlottetown Accord referendum
Side	Votes	%
Non	30,629	67.49
Oui	15,028	32.91

1989 Quebec general election
Party	Candidate	Votes	%
Liberal	Rémy Poulin	19,021	53.76
Parti Québécois	Raymond Brouillet	13,399	37.87
Green	Richard Domm	2,961	8.37
Total valid votes		35,381	97.13
Total rejected ballots		1,046	2.87
Turnout		36,427	74.12
Electors on the lists		49,146	–

1985 Quebec general election
Party	Candidate	Votes	%
Liberal	Rémy Poulin	19,850	58.23
Parti Québécois	Raymond Brouillet	11,337	33.26
New Democratic	Céline Charbonneau	1,720	5.05
Union Nationale	Paul Poulin	1,031	3.02
Christian Socialism	Nelson Marceau	149	0.44
Total valid votes		34,087	98.32
Total rejected ballots		582	1.68
Turnout		34,669	77.14
Electors on the lists		44,945	–

1981 Quebec general election
Party	Candidate	Votes	%
Parti Québécois	Raymond Brouillet	18,991	55.97
Liberal	Réne Dussault	14,073	41.48
Union Nationale	Jean-Pierre Villeneuve	866	2.55
Total valid votes		33,930	98.88
Total rejected ballots		383	1.12
Turnout		34,313	82.93
Electors on the lists		41,378	–

1980 Quebec referendum
Side	Votes	%
Non	28,134	52.14
Oui	25,829	47.86

1976 Quebec general election
Party	Candidate	Votes	%
Parti Québécois	Louis O'Neill	21,472	47.48
Liberal	Bernard Lachapelle	16,418	36.30
Union Nationale	Madeline Parent Barrette	4,829	10.68
Ralliement créditiste	Mathieu Tremblay	2,507	5.54
Total valid votes		45,226	97.91
Total rejected ballots		965	2.09
Turnout		46,191	88.87
Electors on the lists		51,975	–

1976 Quebec general election
Party	Candidate	Votes	%
Parti Québécois	Louis O'Neill	21,472	47.48
Liberal	Bernard Lachapelle	16,418	36.30
Union Nationale	Madeline Parent Barrette	4,829	10.68
Ralliement créditiste	Mathieu Tremblay	2,507	5.54
Total valid votes		45,226	97.91
Total rejected ballots		965	2.09
Turnout		46,191	88.87
Electors on the lists		51,975	–

1973 Quebec general election
Party	Candidate	Votes	%
Liberal	Bernard Lachapelle	18,510	55.22
Parti Québécois	Cécilien Pelchat	9,955	29.70
Parti créditiste	Louis Tardivel	3,726	11.12
Union Nationale	Noël Moisan	1,328	3.96
Total valid votes		33,519	97.98
Total rejected ballots		690	2.02
Turnout		34,209	83.07
Electors on the lists		41,181	–

1970 Quebec general election
Party	Candidate	Votes	%
Liberal	André Harvey	18,469	36.61
Parti créditiste	Ramond Gagné	13,348	26.46
Parti Québécois	Henri Laberge	9,399	18.63
Union Nationale	François-Eugène Mathieu	9,235	18.30
Total valid votes		50,451	98.36
Total rejected ballots		842	1.64
Turnout		51,239	85.94
Electors on the lists		59,688	–

1966 Quebec general election
Party	Candidate	Votes	%
Union Nationale	François-Eugène Mathieu	17,462	47.40
Liberal	Jean-Jacques Bédard	16,420	44.84
RIN	Michel-Guy Huot	1,921	5.21
Ralliement national	Jean-Yves Roy	940	2.55
Total valid votes		36,843	97.64
Total rejected ballots		890	2.36
Turnout		37,733	79.55
Electors on the lists		47,434	–

== See also ==
- List of Quebec provincial electoral districts
- Canadian provincial electoral districts
