= Kariane Bourassa =

Canadian politician

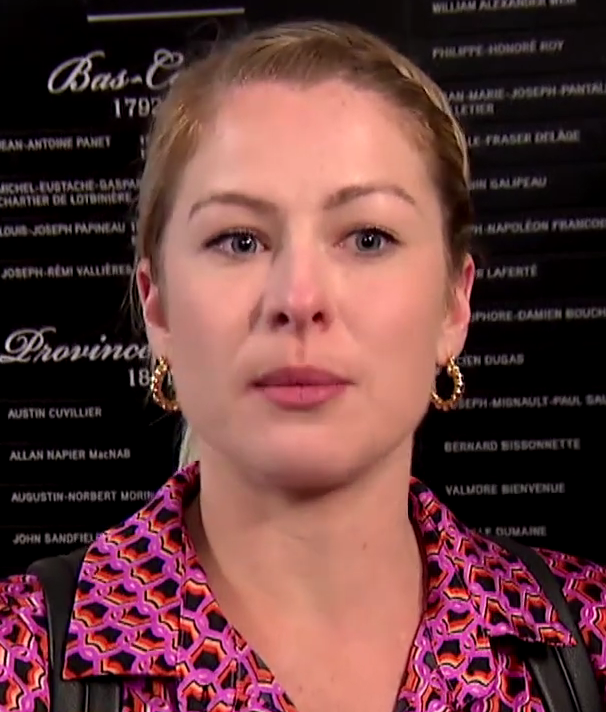
- Bourassa in 2023

Member of the National Assembly of Quebec for Charlevoix–Côte-de-Beaupré
- In office October 3, 2022 – October 5, 2026
- Preceded by: Émilie Foster
- Succeeded by: Caroline Simard

Personal details
- Born: 1991 (age 34–35) Drummondville, Quebec
- Party: Coalition Avenir Québec

Kariane Bourassa is a Canadian politician, who was elected to the National Assembly of Quebec in the 2022 Quebec general election. She represented the riding of Charlevoix–Côte-de-Beaupré as a member of the Coalition Avenir Québec.

== Electoral record ==
2022 Quebec general election: Charlevoix–Côte-de-Beaupré
| Party | Candidate | Votes | % | ±% |
|---|---|---|---|---|
| Coalition Avenir Québec | Kariane Bourassa | 17,979 | 48.17 | +2.80 |
| Conservative | Odré Lacombe | 6,763 | 18.12 | New |
| Parti Québécois | Lucien Rodrigue | 6,041 | 16.19 | –1.12 |
| Québec solidaire | Myriam Fortin | 4,677 | 12.53 | –0.34 |
| Liberal | Michel Bureau | 1,756 | 4.70 | –17.96 |
| Démocratie directe | Stefany Tremblay | 106 | 0.28 | New |
| Total valid votes | | 37,322 | 98.86 | |
| Total rejected ballots | | 430 | 1.14 | –0.57 |
| Turnout | | 37,752 | 70.20 | +1.72 |
| Electors on the lists | | 53,780 | | |
| Coalition Avenir Québec hold | | Swing | | –7.66 |
Source: Élections Québec
