= Louis O'Neill (politician) =

Canadian politician

Louis O'Neill (April 25, 1925 – October 23, 2018) was a Canadian university professor, writer, priest and politician. O'Neill was a member of the National Assembly of Quebec from 1976–1981 and held two cabinet posts.

== Early life ==
Born in Sainte-Foy, Quebec, O'Neill is the son of Thomas O'Neill and Alexandrine Lafontaine. O'Neill studied at the Séminaire de Québec, Université Laval, Angelicum in Rome, and at the University of Strasbourg, in the fields of philosophy and theology. He was ordained a priest on June 3, 1950.

== Career ==
He was a professor at various institutions, including Université Laval and the National University of Rwanda. He wrote for various newspapers including Le Devoir and Le Jour, and various magazines including L'Actualité. He co-wrote various works with Gérard Dion, including the 1956 manifesto L'immoralité politique dans la Province de Québec, a denunciation of "Duplessism".

He ran unsuccessfully for the Parti Québécois in Mercier in the 1973 Quebec general election, but won a seat in Chauveau in 1976. He was Minister of Cultural Affairs from 1976 to 1978, and Minister of Communications from 1976 to 1979. He did not run for re-election in 1981.

He returned to teaching in the department of theology at Université Laval and became professor emeritus in 1999. He was a member of the board of directors for that university, as well as serving as president of the Association of Professors of Laval University.

O'Neill died in October 2018 at the age of 93.
