= Sylvain Légaré =

Canadian politician

MNA for Vanier
- In office September 20, 2004 – November 5, 2008
- Preceded by: Marc Bellemare
- Succeeded by: Patrick Huot

Personal details
- Born: October 22, 1970 (age 55) Quebec City, Quebec
- Party: Action démocratique du Québec

Sylvain Légaré (born October 22, 1970) is a politician in Quebec, Canada. He was an Action démocratique du Québec (ADQ) Member of the National Assembly of Quebec (MNA) for the Vanier riding from 2004 to 2008.

Born in Quebec City, Quebec, Légaré studied financial planning at the Université Laval and TELUQ, graduating in 2000, and has worked as a financial advisor since 1999. He owned a financial service firm in 2003. He also worked at Environment Canada as a weather observer from 1997 to 1999.

He was president of the Charlesbourg Arts Society, co-founder and member of the ADQ's riding association in Vanier, ADQ regional advisor for the Greater Québec region September 2003 to 2004, a logistics adviser for Biathlon Canada (2002–2004), and was a reservist in the 58th Air Defence Battalion of the Canadian Forces for a very short time. He was also a coach and referee in hockey and soccer for local minor leagues

Before his jump to provincial politics, Légaré was a candidate for city council in Quebec City in 2001 but was not elected. He was elected as the MNA for Vanier in the by-election held on September 20, 2004. He has been a member of the National Assembly's committee on labour and the economy since October 20, 2004. He was re-elected in the 2007 elections and named the critic for leisure and sport by Mario Dumont. He was defeated in the 2008 election. On November 1, 2009, Légaré was elected as a city councillor in the Quebec City district of Val-Bélair as a member of the team of Mayor Régis Labeaume for the Quebec City Council.
