= Sarah Perreault =

Canadian politician

MNA for Chauveau
- In office 2003–2007
- Preceded by: Raymond Brouillet
- Succeeded by: Gilles Taillon

Personal details
- Born: September 17, 1962 (age 63) Chicoutimi, Quebec
- Party: Liberal Party of Quebec

Sarah Perreault (born September 17, 1962) is a former political figure in Quebec. She represented Chauveau in the Quebec National Assembly as a Liberal from 2003 to 2007.

She was born in Chicoutimi, Quebec, the daughter of Jean-Guy Perreault and Jacqueline Allard, and was educated at the Université Laval. She worked as an aide for John Crosbie in 1988 and 1989 and was a researcher for the Quebec Liberal Party from 1999 to 2002. She was elected in the 2003 Quebec election but defeated in 2007 and 2008.
