= Marc Bellemare =

Canadian politician

Marc Bellemare (born 3 May 1956) is a lawyer and politician from Canada.

== Background ==
He was born in Saint-Hyacinthe, Quebec, studied Law at the Université de Montréal and was admitted to the Bar of Quebec in 1979.

== Provincial politics ==
Bellemare ran as a star candidate with the Liberal Party in the Quebec election of 2003. He was elected to the National Assembly of Quebec and represented the Quebec City electoral district of Vanier.

He was appointed to Premier Jean Charest's Cabinet on 29 April 2003 and served as Minister of Justice and Attorney General. Bellemare pushed for harsher sentences for organized crime. He was criticized several times by Justice Fraser Martin for the way he handled a juvenile prostitution case which took place in Quebec City and involved talk show host Robert Gillet.

For several years, Bellemare has been a strong advocate of abolishing Quebec's car insurance law. He tried to convince his colleagues to abolish the provincial no fault car insurance plan that had been established in 1978. The Liberals, who had made the proposed change part of their platform, soon abandoned the idea. Disappointed, Bellemare resigned from his cabinet post on 27 April 2004 and relinquished his seat the next day, lasting less than a year in office.

== Mayoral candidate ==
After months of rumors, Bellemare announced that he would be candidate for Mayor of Quebec City. His announcement was made on 11 March 2004. He also founded a political party, Vision Quebec, which was registered on 22 February 2005. Bellemare ended up finishing a distant third. (See 2005 Quebec municipal elections) Originally leading the 2004 polls with over 80% support in the City of Quebec his support disappeared because when asked about his party finances he stated " I do not know where the funds are coming from I don't concern myself with questions of money." This gave citizens concern and he was resoundingly rejected in the election. He also put forward proposals to save the Agora, an outdoor concert venue in the old port of Quebec city.

An early mayoral election was called in 2007, after the death of incumbent Mayor Andrée Boucher. Bellemare ran and finished a distant third again. He resigned as party leader on 26 December 2007. In 2008, Bellemare unsuccessfully petitioned the Papal Nuncio to Canada for an eventual visit of Pope Benedict XVI in Quebec City. Nonetheless, Bellemare was still listed as party leader on the Quebec Chief Election Officer's web site as of June 2008.

== Footnotes ==
National Assembly of Quebec
Preceded by Diane Barbeau (PQ)	MNA, District of Vanier; 2003–2004	Succeeded by Sylvain Légaré (ADQ)
Party political offices
Preceded by None	Leader of Vision Quebec; 2005–2007	Succeeded by Jean-Paul Gravel (Interim Leader)
