= Conservative Party of Quebec =

Provincial political party in Canada

Conservative Party of Quebec Parti conservateur du Québec
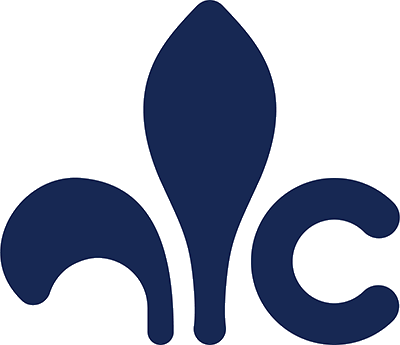
- Abbreviation: PCQ; CPQ
- Leader: Éric Duhaime
- President: Chantal Dauphinais
- Founder(s): Serge Fontaine; Bertrand Goulet
- Founded: 25 March 2009; 17 years ago
- Headquarters: 400-1020 Bouvier Road; Quebec City, Quebec; G2K 0K9
- Membership (2026): ▲65,000
- Ideology: Conservatism (Canadian); Economic liberalism; Factions: Quebec federalism; Quebec nationalism; Quebec autonomism
- Political position: Right-wing
- Seats in the National Assembly: 19 / 127

Website
- www.conservative.quebec

The Conservative Party of Quebec (CPQ; French: Parti conservateur du Québec [paʁti kɔ̃sɛʁvatœʁ dy kebɛk], PCQ) is a provincial political party in Quebec, Canada. It was authorized on 25 March 2009 by the Chief Electoral Officer of Quebec. The CPQ has gradually run more candidates in successive elections, with 27 in the 2012 general election and 125 (all seats contested) in 2022. In 2026, the party won seats in the National Assembly of Quebec for the first time under leader Éric Duhaime, claiming about 20% of the popular vote and 19 seats, a considerable increase from 2022 when the CPQ won about 12.9% of the popular vote. Previously on 18 June 2021 Claire Samson crossed the floor to join the party after having won election in 2018 as a candidate of the governing Coalition Avenir Québec (CAQ).

For the 2014 provincial election, the party used the name "Équipe Adrien Pouliot – Parti conservateur du Québec" (English: Team Adrien Pouliot – Conservative Party of Quebec). For the 2022 provincial election, the party used the name "Parti conservateur du Québec – Équipe Éric Duhaime" (English: Conservative Party of Quebec – Team Éric Duhaime).

== History ==
=== Early history ===
In 2009, former Union Nationale Members of the National Assembly of Quebec (MNAs) Serge Fontaine and Bertrand Goulet announced the formation of a new Conservative Party of Quebec.

In November 2009, Fontaine offered Éric Caire, who at the time sat with the Action démocratique du Québec (ADQ), the opportunity to join the party and become its leader, with the goal of attracting disaffected ADQ supporters. This did not materialize and Caire sat as an independent before joining the Coalition Avenir Québec in November 2011.

In January 2012, the party, which still existed on paper, was taken over by the former federal Conservative Member of Parliament (MP) for the Louis-Hébert riding, Luc Harvey, who became its leader.

In contrast to the newly formed CAQ, which is neutral on the sovereignty issue, Harvey said the Conservatives will be federalist, promote a social conservative agenda and a flat tax.

In March 2012, the party's website announced that former Action démocratique du Québec (ADQ) MNAs Monique Roy Verville and Albert De Martin would run for the party in the upcoming election.

On 10 September 2012, it was announced that Harvey was stepping down as party leader. De Martin was named interim leader on 21 September.

In December 2012, De Martin launched a leadership election. As a result, two contenders, Daniel Brisson and Adrien D. Pouliot, declared their intention to run.

In mid-February 2013, Brisson withdrew from the leadership election, leaving Pouliot as the sole candidate.

Pouliot was acclaimed the new leader on 23 February 2013 and immediately put a new constitution forward for the members present at its convention. It was immediately ratified by all the members and refocused the stance of the party to more of a centre-right value system. Later that day, he took a stance against the proposed Parti Québécois laws 14 and 20.

In the 2014 provincial election, the party nominated 60 candidates, who won 16,429 votes, 0.4 percent of the total votes cast in the province. In the 2018 election, these numbers increased to 101 nominated candidates winning 59,055 votes, or 1.5 percent of the total votes.

=== Rise under Éric Duhaime ===
On 16 October 2020, Adrien Pouliot announced he would be resigning as leader of the party to pursue further business ventures, but opted to stay on until a new leader was elected in the 2021 leadership election, which was won by columnist Éric Duhaime who handily defeated repeat candidate Brisson in a two-way contest.

On 18 June 2021, Claire Samson became the first member of the modern Conservative Party of Quebec to sit in the Quebec legislature. (Note: Samson was the first member of the National Assembly of Quebec to identify as a Conservative since 1936.) This followed her expulsion from the CAQ three days prior, after she donated $100 to the Conservative Party of Quebec.

The Conservative Party of Quebec nominated candidates in all 125 ridings for the 2022 provincial election. The party won 12.91% of the popular vote, placing fifth in the popular vote and winning no seats despite four opposition parties being closely matched in the popular vote, but performing strongly in many ridings, especially in the Capitale-Nationale and Chaudière-Appalaches regions with a strong conservative tradition. However, the party made gains throughout the province at the expense of Liberals, reducing the Liberal vote share in its traditional strongholds such as Montreal. Party leader Duhaime expressed his opposition to Bill 96, a French language law.

On 24 March 2026, independent MNA Maïté Blanchette Vézina joined the party; she was previously a member of the Legault ministry. That same year, the party rose considerably in popularity; winning 19 seats in the 2026 provincial election, particularly in the Quebec City area, and winning 20.7% of the popular vote.

== Executive ==
The Conservative Party of Quebec's executive consists of its leader, its president, its secretary-general, an official agent, an executive director, committee chairs, and regional vice-presidents.

- Leader: Éric Duhaime
- President: Chantal Dauphinais
- Vice-president: Donald Gagnon
- Official Agent: Patrice Raza
- Interim Executive Director: Eric Tetrault
- Secretary-General & Chairperson of the Constitution Committee: Konstantinos Merakos
- Chairperson of the Communications Committee: Eric Tetrault
- Chairperson of the Organizational & Finance Committee: Olivier Dumais
- Chairperson of the Policy Committee: Karim Elayoubi
- Regional Vice-presidents:
  - Bas-Saint-Laurent, Gaspésie-Îles-de-la-Madeleine and Côte-Nord: Louise Moreault
  - Montreal and Laval: Marie-France Lemay
  - Capitale-Nationale and Chaudière-Appalaches: Christian Gauthier
  - Mauricie, Centre-du-Québec and Saguenay-Lac-Saint-Jean: Jessy Comtois
  - Montérégie and Estrie: Marylaine Bélair
  - Nord-du-Québec, Abitibi-Témiscamingue, Outaouais, Laurentides and Lanaudière: Ange Claude Bigilimana

== Leaders ==
Leader		Term start	Term end	Notes
1st	Serge Fontaine	25 March 2009	November 2011	Inaugural leader, later defected to the Coalition Avenir Québec.
—	Vacant	November 2011	18 January 2012	The position of leader was left vacant from November 2011 to January 2012. No interim leader was appointed.
2nd	Luc Harvey	18 January 2012	11 September 2012	Previously served as the federal MP for Louis-Hébert. Resigned shortly after the 2012 election.
—	Albert De Martin	21 September 2012	23 February 2013	Interim leader.
3rd	Adrien D. Pouliot	23 February 2013	17 April 2021	Longest serving leader. Resigned to pursue further business ventures.
4th	Éric Duhaime	17 April 2021	Incumbent	Led the party to 12.9% of the popular vote in the 2022 general election from 1.5% in 2018. Led the party to winning 19 seats in the 2026 general election.

== Conservative MNAs ==
Member	District	Tenure	Notes
Marcos Archambault	Louis-Hébert	2026–present	
Maïté Blanchette Vézina	Rimouski (2022–2026); La Peltrie (2026–present)	2026–present	Served as a CAQ MNA from 2022 to 2025.
Marcel Bouchard	Portneuf	2026–present	
Éloïse Coulombe	Charlesbourg	2026–present	
Patricia Drouin	Beauce-Nord	2026–present	
Éric Duhaime	Bellechasse	2026–present	Party leader.
Dominique Dumas	Chutes-de-la-Chaudière	2026–present	
Karim Elayoubi	Chauveau	2026–present	
Jimmy Gagnon	Mégantic	2026–present	
Marie-Josée Hélie	Montmorency	2026–present	
Tarek Henoud	Arthabaska–L'Érable	2026–present	
Renaud Labrecque	Lotbinière-Frontenac	2026–present	
Karine Laflamme	Lévis	2026–present	
Guillaume Langlois	Nicolet-Bécancour	2026–present	
Patrick Paquet	Vanier-Les Rivières	2026–present	
Frédéric Poulin	Côte-du-Sud	2026–present	
Jonathan Poulin	Beauce-Sud	2026–present	
Claire Samson	Iberville	2021–2022	Served as a CAQ MNA from 2014 to 2021.
Caroline Simard	Charlevoix–Côte-de-Beaupré	2026–present	Served as a Liberal MNA from 2014 to 2018.
Adriana Szalontai	Champlain	2026–present	

== Election results ==
Election	Leader	Seats contested	Seats won	±	Votes	%	Rank	Status/Gov.
2012	Luc Harvey	27 / 125	0 / 125	Steady	7,652	0.2%	7th	Extra-parliamentary
2014	Adrien D. Pouliot	60 / 125	0 / 125	Steady	▲16,429	▲0.4%	7th	Extra-parliamentary
2018	Adrien D. Pouliot	101 / 125	0 / 125	Steady	▲59,053	▲1.5%	▲6th	Extra-parliamentary
2022	Éric Duhaime	125 / 125	0 / 125	Steady	▲530,804	▲12.9%	▲5th	Extra-parliamentary
2026	Éric Duhaime	127 / 127	19 / 127	▲18	▲885,164	▲20.6%	▲3rd	Third party
