= Action démocratique du Québec candidates in the 2008 Quebec provincial election =

The Action démocratique du Québec (ADQ) party ran a full slate of 125 candidates in the 2008 provincial election and elected seven members to emerge as the third-largest party in the legislature.

== Candidates ==
=== Argenteuil: Michael Perzow ===
Michael Perzow is a clothing manufacturer, racehorse owner, and horse breeder. He has been president of a clothing supplier group and has operated Oka Valley Standardbreds. In 2008, he blamed a bad privatization process for a decline in Quebec's commercial horse breeding sector. He received 2,457 votes (11.24%) in the 2008 election, finishing third against Liberal incumbent David Whissell.

=== Brome—Missisquoi: Mario Charpentier ===
Mario Charpentier was born in Saint-Hyacinthe, Quebec. He has a Bachelor of Laws degree from the Université de Sherbrooke (1985) and was called to the Bar of Quebec in 1986. He helped found the firm BCF LLP in 1995 and remains a partner as of 2010. Before joining the ADQ, he was a member of the Quebec Liberal Party.

He was the ADQ's vice-president in the buildup to the 2008 election and helped draft the party's economic platform. In November 2008, he contradicted party leader Mario Dumont on a proposed increase to Quebec's minimum wage. (Dumont had said the ADQ would likely support an increase, while Charpentier said that it was not appropriate policy during an economic downturn. Charpentier later nuanced his position.) He received 5,073 votes (16.65%) in the election, finishing third against Liberal Party incumbent Pierre Paradis.

Charpentier became ADQ party president in December 2008, when Tom Pentefountas resigned the position after the party's disappointing performance in the 2008 election. He resigned from the position in November 2009 following reports that he offered to donate money to Gilles Taillon in the party's 2009 leadership contest when he was supposed to have remained neutral. Taillon announced his own resignation shortly thereafter.

=== Fabre: Tom Pentefountas ===
Tom Pentefountas (born November 28, 1964) has a Bachelor of Arts degree in political science from Concordia University and a Bachelor of Laws degree (1994) from the University of Ottawa. He a defense lawyer in Quebec.

He has represented several high-profile clients, including a person accused in early 2000 of plotting to bomb Israeli diplomatic buildings in Canada. (The Royal Canadian Mounted Police later acknowledged that they may have arrested the wrong person, and the defendant was acquitted in November 2000.) Pentefountas also represented the man who ultimately pleaded guilty to murdering actress Denise Morelle.

Pentefountas first ran for the ADQ in a 2004 by-election in the west Montreal division of Nelligan, focusing his campaign on improving public transit. He finished fourth against Liberal Party candidate Yolande James.

He was elected as ADQ president in September 2007, replacing Gilles Taillon. In this capacity, he was commissioned with improving the party's fortunes in Montreal. He resigned the position in December 2008, after the party's disappointing performance in the 2008 election. Pentefountas himself was defeated in a Laval division.

Pentefountas is of Greek background and is fluent in English, French, and Greek.

Electoral record
Election	Division	Party	Votes	%	Place	Winner
provincial by-election, September 20, 2004	Nelligan	Action démocratique	1,039	6.99	4/7	Yolande James, Liberal
2008 provincial	Fabre	Action démocratique	4,024	11.93	3/5	Michelle Courchesne, Liberal

=== Gatineau: Serge Charette ===
Serge Charette has been a dairy farmer in the Gatineau area since 1989. He has diplomas in professional management (1981) and dairy farm management (1998) and has been active in the Union des producteurs agricoles (UPA) and the Fédération des producteurs de lait du Québec. He is a member of the Knights of Columbus.

Charette joined the ADQ in 1997 and has run for the party four provincial elections. He has also sought election at the municipal level. Thirty-nine years old in 2003, he called in that year's election for private medical clinics that could remain open twenty-four hours a day.

He supported Éric Caire in the 2009 ADQ leadership election.

Electoral record
Election	Division	Party	Votes	%	Place	Winner
1998 provincial	Chapleau	Action démocratique	3,617	8.81	3/6	Benoît Pelletier, Liberal
2003 provincial	Papineau	Action démocratique	3,833	12.40	3/5	Norman MacMillan, Liberal
2007 provincial	Papineau	Action démocratique	9,115	26.25	3/5	Norman MacMillan, Liberal
2008 provincial	Gatineau	Action démocratique	2,318	9.52	3/4	Stéphanie Vallée, Liberal
2009 municipal	Gatineau council, Ward 14	n/a	424	10.52	3/3	Sylvie Goneau

=== Orford: Pierre Harvey ===
Pierre Harvey was born in Sherbrooke and has a Master's degree from Long Island University. He began working in international trade in 1992. In 2004, he wrote a lengthy public letter calling for the Canadian government to decentralize its authority into five regions: the Maritimes, Quebec, Ontario, the west, and British Columbia. He has also written against the Canadian Firearms Registry.

Harvey ran for a Sherbrooke City Council seat in 2005, without success. Forty-one years old during the 2008 election, he worked as chief development officer of the Musée de la Nature et des Sciences de Sherbrooke and was president of a private elementary school. His provincial campaign was based, in part, around a plan to decentralize Quebec's education system. He also made an effort to reach out to anglophone voters.

He is not to be confused with a different Pierre Harvey who ran for the ADQ in a Montreal riding in the 2007 provincial election.

Electoral record
Election	Division	Party	Votes	%	Place	Winner
2005 municipal	Sherbrooke council, Forest-Saint-Elie-Deauville Seat Four	n/a	856	34.50	2/2	Julien Lachance
2008 provincial	Orford	Action démocratique	4,516	13.32	3/5	Pierre Reid, Liberal

=== Richelieu: Patrick Fournier ===
Patrick Fournier was born in Saint-Hyacinthe, Quebec. He moved to Saint-Denis-sur-Richelieu in 2006 and joined the ADQ in January 2007. He was thirty-two years old at the time of the election, with experience as a salesman of electrical materials. He received 3,126 votes (12.67%), finishing third against Parti Québécois incumbent Sylvain Simard.
