= France Hamel =

Canadian politician

France Hamel (born August 7, 1952 in Quebec City, Quebec) was a member of the National Assembly of Quebec for the Quebec Liberal Party in La Peltrie from 2003 to 2007.

From 1997 to 2001 she was a municipal councilor in Saint-Augustin-de-Desmaures, whose successful 2006 demerger from Quebec City she strongly supported.

She was elected in the 2003 election, succeeding Michel Côté as Member of the National Assembly for La Peltrie. She was defeated in 2007 by Éric Caire of the ADQ.
