= Le Québécois Libre =

Former Canadian online libertarian magazine

Le Québécois Libre (or QL) was an online libertarian magazine, or webzine published in Quebec, Canada. The QL, owned and published by Martin Masse since February 1998. It published a classical liberal point of view on numerous topics, particularly related to current affairs in Quebec, or, to a lesser extent, France and the United States.In 2016 the magazine ceased publication.

== Etymology ==
The name Le Québécois Libre is a pun on "Québec Libre", a sovereigntist slogan, as the magazine aimed to promote the freedom of those living in Quebec rather than the nationalist aim of promoting the state.

== History ==
In 1995, in Saint-Eustache Quebec, Masse met with four friends Éric Duhaime, Michel Kelly-Gagnon, Pierre Lemieux and Pierre Desrochers, a professor of geography at the University of Toronto Mississauga. These five friends agreed on three priorities to advance the libertarian movement in Quebec: to revive the Montreal Economic Institute (MEI), create Les amis de la liberté (Friends of Liberty), an association serving as a meeting place and to present conferences and to found a magazine which would be Le Québécois Libre.

Masse, who worked for MEI, was the editor-in-chief of the magazine. Masse, who met Maxime Bernier in MEI, later became an political advisor to Bernier and co-founded the People's Party of Canada with him. Both Masse, who joined the Reform Party of Canada before 1995 referendum on Quebec independence, and Bernier consider themselves paleolibertarians.

The principal language of the magazine was French, but a quarter of the articles were written in English. Le Québécois Libre accommodated all liberal views including minarchism and anarcho-capitalism. Articles have been featured on National Post and C2C journals.

It featured articles by Masse, Duhaime, Scott Reid and Pascal Salin, among others. In 2016 the magazine ceased publication.

== Reception and criticism ==
In 2008, Macleans Journalist Paul Wells noticed that Masse came to Bernier defense on the Le Québécois Libre blog after he resigned as minister of foreign affairs due to the Couillard Affair.

In 2019, Jewish-Canadian group B’nai Brith Canada released findings of Masse arguing that he fomented “antisemitism, misogyny, and racism” in his past writings. The group found out in 2000 that Masse called them "ethnic barons", that he defended Jean-Marie Le Pen, who was convicted of Holocaust denial, critical of French gay rights movement, Quebec feminists and opinions about the Israeli-Palestinian conflict that were antisemitic. La Presse pointed out Masse in his writing also called that former Austrian leader Jörg Haider as not a neo-Nazis and called environmental activist as "green fascists".

Journalist Thomas Laberge, writing in his book, En rupture avec l’État, which documents the libertarian movement in Quebec, noted ties between several members of MEI and Le Québécois Libre as either readers or contributors.
