= 2009 Action démocratique du Québec leadership elections =

2009 Action démocratique du Québec leadership election
- Date: October 18, 2009
- Resigning leader: Mario Dumont
- Won by: Gilles Taillon
- Ballots: 2
- Candidates: 3

2009 Action démocratique du Québec leadership election
- Date: November 19, 2009
- Resigning leader: Gilles Taillon
- Won by: Gérard Deltell
- Ballots: None
- Candidates: 1

The first 2009 Action démocratique du Québec leadership election took place on October 18, 2009 electing Gilles Taillon on the second ballot by a margin of two votes over Éric Caire. On November 19, 2009, Gérard Deltell was chosen to replace Taillon after a leadership vacuum.

== Background ==
After the results of the 2008 Quebec election, in which the ADQ went from being the official opposition, and 39 seats (41 MNA's had been elected in 2007, but two crossed the floor to the Liberals) to the traditional third-party role and seven seats, longtime leader Mario Dumont stepped down from the leadership of the party.

== Candidates ==
=== Éric Caire ===
Éric Caire, 43 the MNA for La Peltrie. He was elected in 2007, and has served as the Official Opposition's Shadow Minister of Health.

- MNAs who are supporters: Marc Picard, MNA for Chutes-de-la-Chaudière
- Federal MPs who are supporters:
- Senators who are supporters:
- Other high-profile supporters: Film-maker Denis Julien and Joanne Marcotte, former MNA's Richard Merlini, François Benjamin, François Desrochers, Pascal Beaupré, Éric Laporte, Sylvain Légaré, Jean-François Roux, Martin Camirand, Hubert Benoit and Catherine Morissette, former ADQ candidates Ian Senechal, Luigi Verrelli, Guy Boutin, Serge Charette, Marc Jomphe, Martin Briand, Jean Nobert, Bruno Lemieux and Matthew Conway withdrawn leadership candidate, Myriam Taschereau, President of the CDJ Martin-Karl Bourbonnais, President of Marquette Louis-Charles Fortier, founding member of the ADQ Patrick Robitaille,

=== Christian Lévesque ===
Christian Lévesque, 39, the former MNA for Lévis. He was elected in 2007 and served as Official Opposition's Shadow Minister for the Treasury Board.

- MNAs who are supporters:
- Federal MPs who are supporters:
- Senators who are supporters:
- Other high-profile supporters: Raymond Bréard, the former director-general of the Parti Québécois, Raynald Bernier, former PQ advisor, former MNA's Albert De Martin, Monique Roy Verville, Eric Charbonneau, Jean Damphousse, Claude L'Écuyer

=== Gilles Taillon ===
Gilles Taillon, 63, former MNA for Chauveau, and former President of the ADQ and the Conseil du patronat du Québec. He served as Deputy Leader and the Official Opposition's Shadow Minister of Finance.

- MNAs who are supporters (1): François Bonnardel, MNA for Shefford
- Federal MPs who are supporters:
- Senators who are supporters:
- Other high-profile supporters: Former MNA's Linda Lapointe, Pierre Gingras, Lucille Méthé, Lucie Leblanc

== Potential candidates who did not enter ==
- Maxime Bernier, 46, Conservative MP for Beauce, and former Minister of Foreign Affairs, said he would not run despite a "Draft Bernier" movement.
- François Bonnardel, MNA for Shefford, was considered a potential candidate, but instead endorsed and became a campaign chair for Gilles Taillon.
- Gérard Deltell, MNA for Chauveau. Many grassroots supporters had urged him to run, but he declined.
- Paul Daniel Muller, former President of the Montreal Economic Institute.
- Myriam Taschereau, 38, former Conservative Party of Canada candidate for Québec and Director of Communications for Quebec in the Prime Minister's Office. Declared she would run but then withdrew due to lack of support. She now supports Eric Caire.

== Rejected candidates ==
=== Jean-François Plante ===
Jean-François Plante, former Montreal City Councillor (1998–2005) for the Vision Montreal Party, ADQ candidate and owner and host of Radio XTRM, an internet radio show. His campaign was rejected on the grounds the 1,000 signatures he had collected were not valid.

== Rules and deadlines ==
The new leader was elected by all party members through a preferential ballot cast electronically the new leader being announced in early October 2009. Interested parties must collect 1,000 signatures, including at least 60 in a dozen different regions of Quebec. They must also pay a deposit of $15,000.

== Results ==
First Ballot

- Caire 41%
- Taillon 40%
- Lévesque 19%

(Lévesque eliminated)

Second Ballot

- Taillon 50.03% (1,957 votes)
- Caire 49.97% (1,955 votes)

Turnout: 29%

== Polls ==
CROP Poll, May 26.

- Gilles Taillon-21%
- Éric Caire-10%
- Myriam Taschereau-4%
- Christian Lévesque-3%

No favoured candidate-12% No answer/Don't know-50%

== Aftermath ==
On November 6, 2009, Caire and supporter Marc Picard left the party, alleging that the party organization lacked transparency and that Taillon had a dictatorial style of leadership. They resigned from caucus to sit as independents. This reduced the size of the ADQ caucus to four seats in the National Assembly.

On November 10, 2009, 23 days after his election as party leader, Taillon announced a new leadership election, citing the party infighting and alleging irregularities in the party's financial affairs, dating back to 2003, which he had called in the Sûreté du Québec to investigate. It was later revealed that he never contacted the Sûreté du Québec. He then explained that he would remain the leader until the results of a new leadership election, in which he would not be a candidate. Caire said he would not run again for the party leadership, adding "Mr. Taillon has done irreparable damage to the ADQ... I don't know how the party will recover from this. I can't see the party going through a second leadership race. The last one almost destroyed us."

=== Second leadership election ===
On November 19, 2009, the party executive acclaimed Gérard Deltell as the party's leader. After Deltell assumed the leadership, the party enjoyed a modest rebound, rising from 5% in the polls in spring 2010 to 15% by the end of the year, and enjoying a substantial lead in the Quebec City region. The party maintained the level of support it had had in the 2008 election in the by-elections held in Saint-Laurent and Kamouraska-Temiscouata in fall 2010. The ADQ held a convention on November 13, 2010, adopting a number of proposals dealing with democratic reform and anti-corruption measures. Deltell received a 97% vote of confidence from the party membership and received considerable attention when, in his opening address, he referred to Premier Jean Charest as the "godfather of the Liberal family". Charest threatened legal action if the statement was not retracted. Deltell refused to apologize or issue a retraction and no action was taken.
