= 2001 Sherbrooke municipal election =

The 2001 Sherbrooke municipal election was held on November 4, 2001, to elect a mayor and city councillors in Sherbrooke, Quebec. The communities of Brompton and Lennoxville also elected borough councillors, who do not serve on the city council.

== Results ==
=== Mayor ===
2001 Sherbrooke election, Mayor of Sherbrooke
Candidate	Total votes	% of total votes
(incumbent)Jean Perrault	25,277	56.52
Richard Gingras	18,476	41.31
Leon Paquette	967	2.16
Total valid votes	44,720	100.00

=== Councillors ===
2001 Sherbrooke election, Brompton Councillor
Candidate	Total votes	% of total votes
Clement Nault	1,888	73.24
Claude Belhumeur	690	26.76
Total valid votes	2,578	100.00

2001 Sherbrooke election, Brompton Borough Councillor One
Candidate	Total votes	% of total votes
Nicole Bergeron	accl.	.

2001 Sherbrooke election, Brompton Borough Councillor Two
Candidate	Total votes	% of total votes
Michel Lamontagne	433	39.08
Solange Morisette	354	31.95
Germain Parenteau	321	28.97
Total valid votes	1,108	100.00

2001 Sherbrooke election, Fleurimont Councillor One
Candidate	Total votes	% of total votes
Mariette Fugère	1,094	43.43
Raymond Fillion	777	30.85
Jean De Francesco	648	25.72
Total valid votes	2,519	100.00

2001 Sherbrooke election, Fleurimont Councillor Two
Candidate	Total votes	% of total votes
Roger Labrecque	1,242	56.38
Serge Blais	961	43.62
Total valid votes	2,203	100.00

2001 Sherbrooke election, Fleurimont Councillor Three
Candidate	Total votes	% of total votes
Francis Gagnon	accl.	.

2001 Sherbrooke election, Fleurimont Councillor Four
Candidate	Total votes	% of total votes
Louida Brochu	1,536	54.03
Johanne Marcil	740	26.03
Michel Lemay	567	19.94
Total valid votes	2,843	100.00

2001 Sherbrooke election, Fleurimont Councillor Five
Candidate	Total votes	% of total votes
Bernard Tanguay	1,600	64.94
Michel Carrier	864	35.06
Total valid votes	2,464	100.00

2001 Sherbrooke election, Lennoxville Councillor
Candidate	Total votes	% of total votes
Douglas MacAulay	860	48.70
Pierre H. Masse	719	40.71
Edward Henson	187	10.59
Total valid votes	1,766	100.00

2001 Sherbrooke election, Lennoxville Borough Councillor One
Candidate	Total votes	% of total votes
William Smith	575	60.08
Robert Passmore	382	39.92
Total valid votes	957	100.00

2001 Sherbrooke election, Lennoxville Borough Councillor Two
Candidate	Total votes	% of total votes
Thomas Allen	547	75.76
Bernard Rodrigue	175	24.24
Total valid votes	722	100.00

2001 Sherbrooke election, Mont-Bellevue Councillor One
Candidate	Total votes	% of total votes
Serge Paquin	1,177	86.29
Richard Hubert	187	13.71
Total valid votes	1,364	100.00

2001 Sherbrooke election, Mont-Bellevue Councillor Two
Candidate	Total votes	% of total votes
Robert Y. Pouliot	1,312	63.94
Denis Demers	740	36.06
Total valid votes	2,052	100.00

2001 Sherbrooke election, Mont-Bellevue Councillor Three
Candidate	Total votes	% of total votes
Pierre Boisvert	1,851	71.11
Gilles Quenneville	599	23.01
Cherif B. N'doye	153	5.88
Total valid votes	2,603	100.00

2001 Sherbrooke election, Mont-Bellevue Councillor Four
Candidate	Total votes	% of total votes
Jean-François Rouleau	accl.	.

2001 Sherbrooke election, Rock-Forest-Saint-Elie-Deauville Councillor One
Candidate	Total votes	% of total votes
Diane Délisle	536	35.01
Leonard Laplante	466	30.44
Anne-Josee Ferland	421	27.50
Marcel Chenard	77	5.03
Jean-Marc Nadeau	31	2.02
Total valid votes	1,531	100.00

2001 Sherbrooke election, Rock-Forest-Saint-Elie-Deauville Councillor Two
Candidate	Total votes	% of total votes
Bernard Sevigny	921	37.78
Benoit Charland	684	28.06
Sonya Vanier	471	19.32
Daniel Chasse	362	14.85
Total valid votes	2,438	100.00

2001 Sherbrooke election, Rock-Forest-Saint-Elie-Deauville Councillor Three
Candidate	Total votes	% of total votes
Serge Forest	1,619	67.85
Alain Demers	767	32.15
Total valid votes	2,386	100.00

2001 Sherbrooke election, Rock-Forest-Saint-Elie-Deauville Councillor Four
Candidate	Total votes	% of total votes
Julien Lachance	1,508	61.80
Marie-Paule Samson	932	38.20
Total valid votes	2,440	100.00

- Marie-Paule Samson served on council for four years before her defeat in 2001. She worked with the Societe de Developpement Economique de la Region Sherbrookoise, the regional police. and the CLD.

2001 Sherbrooke election, Jacques-Cartier Councillor One
Candidate	Total votes	% of total votes
Jacques Testulat	accl.	.

2001 Sherbrooke election, Jacques-Cartier Councillor Two
Candidate	Total votes	% of total votes
Chantal L'Espérance	accl.	.

2001 Sherbrooke election, Jacques-Cartier Councillor Three
Candidate	Total votes	% of total votes
Marc Denault	1,459	56.40
Anne Boutin	1,128	43.60
Total valid votes	2,587	100.00

2001 Sherbrooke election, Jacques-Cartier Councillor Four
Candidate	Total votes	% of total votes
Dany Lachance	accl.	.

Source: "Election 2001 Sherbrooke & Townships," Sherbrooke Record, 6 November 2001, p. 4.
