= Michel Côté =

Michel Côté may refer to:

- Michel Côté (actor) (1950–2023), an actor in Quebec
- Michel Côté (MP) (born 1942), Canadian Member of Parliament and cabinet minister for the Progressive Conservative Party of Canada
- Michel Côté (MNA) (born 1937), member of the National Assembly of Quebec for the Liberal Party of Quebec
