= Joanne Marcotte =

Canadian activist

Joanne Marcotte is a Canadian libertarian political activist and one of the founding members of the Réseau Liberté-Québec. She made a documentary, L'illusion tranquille, and wrote an essay criticizing Quebec's social democratic economic system. She was active in the Action démocratique du Québec (ADQ) from 2003 to 2009.

She holds a degree in Computer Engineering from Université Laval and is pursuing a master's degree in public affairs.

== Political activism ==
- From 2004 to 2006, in coproduction with Denis Julien, Joanne Marcotte realized L'Illusion Tranquille a political essay criticizing Quebec's economic system, in which advocates of libertarianism are interviewed. The film was released to Quebec theatres in November 2006.
- In 2007, she represented the ADQ within the working group to redirect funding from Quebec's public health system in favour of privatization. Chaired by Claude Castonguay, this working group has seen its main conclusions rejected by the Quebec minister of health at the time, Philippe Couillard.
- Since 2009, she is featured in a special segment on Wednesdays at noon on the Dupont le midi show on CHOI-FM.
- In fall 2009, she advised ADQ leadership candidate Éric Caire.
- In the summer of 2010, she participated in the creation of Réseau Liberté-Québec, a nonprofit libertarian organization aiming to network and consolidate the right-wing in Quebec. She is one of the spokespeople of this movement since its founding.
- In November 2011, she released her first essay, Pour en finir avec le Gouvernemaman. This essay is, according to Marcotte, a continuation of l'Illusion Tranquille.

== Publications ==
- L'Illusion Tranquille, 72 minute long documentary criticizing the "Quebec model";
- Pour en finir avec le Gouvernemaman, a 198 page long political essay.
