= Mathieu Bock-Côté =

Canadian academic, columnist, and essayist (born 1980)

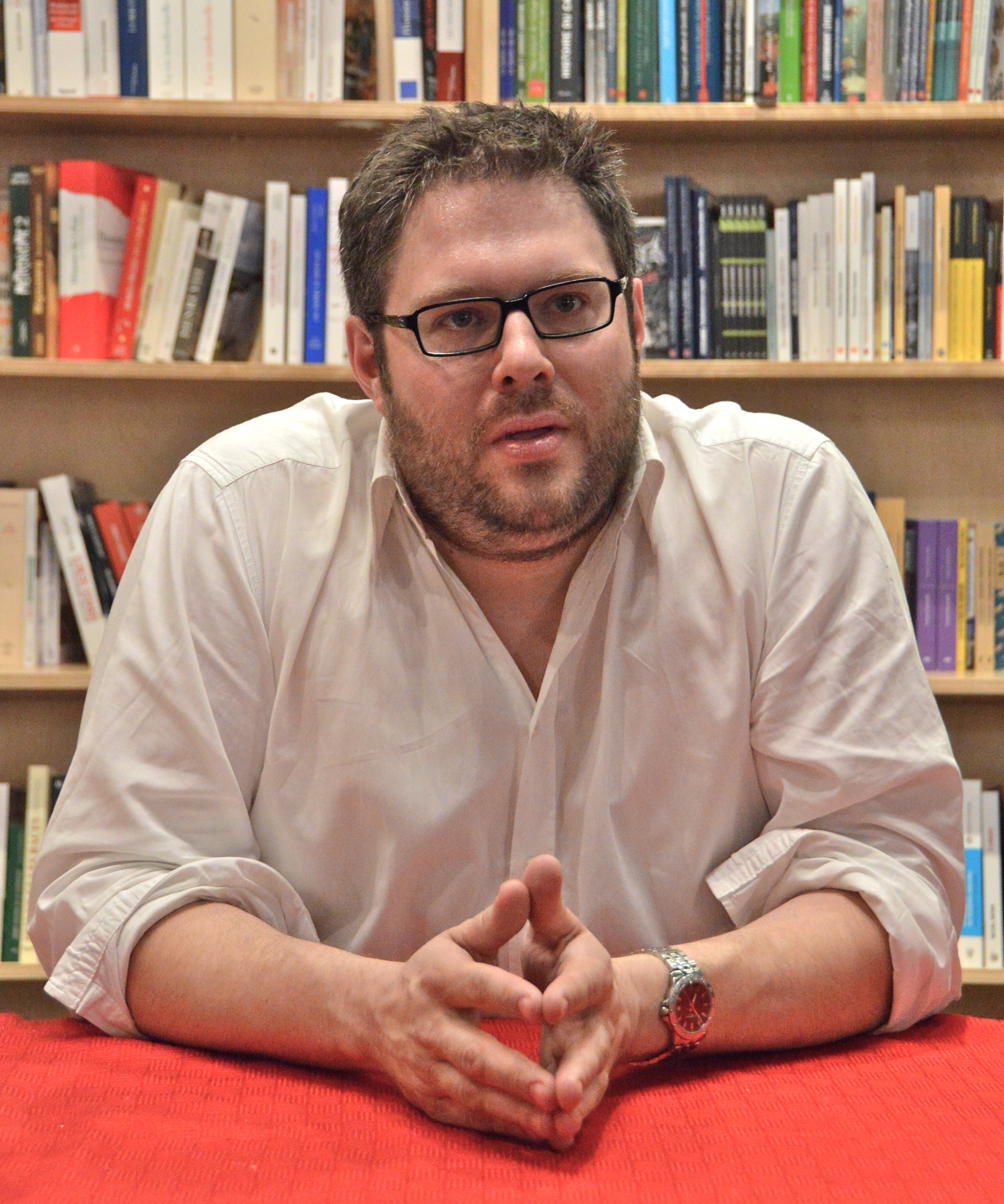
- Bock-Côté in Quebec City, 2017
- Born: August 20, 1980 (age 46); Lorraine, Quebec, Canada
- Education: Université de Montréal (BA); Université du Québec à Montréal (MA, PhD)
- Known for: Quebec nationalism, Quebec sovereignty movement, cultural conservatism, social conservatism, free speech, criticism of multiculturalism
- Scientific career
- Fields: Philosophy; Sociology
- Thesis: La mutation de la gauche et la recomposition du champ politique occidental : 1968–2010 (2013)
- Doctoral advisor: Jacques Beauchemin

Mathieu Bock-Côté (French: [matjø bɔk kote]; born August 20, 1980), often referred to by his initials MBC, is a Canadian sociologist, essayist, public intellectual, and conservative political commentator who resides in Paris, where he appears as a television and radio personality.

Bock-Côté, a noted columnist at Le Journal de Montréal, is known for his work on and criticism of multiculturalism and immigration. He strongly supports the Quebec sovereignty movement.

== Career ==
=== Academic career ===
An alumnus of the Université de Montréal (UdeM) and Université du Québec à Montréal (UQAM), from which he received his PhD, Bock-Côté worked at the Université de Sherbrooke (UdeS) as a chargé de cours (lecturer), a position he holds at UdeM's HEC Montréal.

=== Media career ===
Bock-Côté worked as a columnist for 24 Hours before being hired by Le Journal de Montréal by his friend and owner Pierre Karl Péladeau. His open letters have been published in newspapers such as La Presse and Le Devoir. When he resided in Montreal, he was a frequent guest on television shows on Télé-Québec and Le Canal Nouvelles. In France, his columns are published by Le Figaro.

In 2021, Bock-Côté moved to Paris as he was recruited by CNews to participate in a Saturday weekly political show hosted by Thomas Lequertier, in which he debates about public affairs with a guest. In parallel, he appeared as a guest on some of the channel's other programs. Bock-Côté also has a ten-minute morning radio column on Europe 1 four times a week titled "La Carte blanche de Mathieu Bock-Côté". He has become an attentive follower of French politics, stating: "France is a fascinating intellectual and political laboratory."

=== Political activism ===
Best known for his advocacy of Quebec nationalism and free speech, Bock-Côté is a prominent critic of multiculturalism, anationalism, and political correctness. Politically a sovereignist and nationalist, Bock-Côté identifies as a conservative and is a critic of cancel culture. He has been described as a "conservative republican". His approach on Quebec independence differs from previous Parti Québécois politicians such Rene Levesque and Gerald Godin in that his approach on Quebec Nationalism has been described as not civic or inclusive. He alongside Jean Francois Lisee are cited for influencing the PQ from moving away from their history towards identity nationalism. In April 2012, he participated in Réseau Liberté-Québec conference located in Levis which was organized by Eric Duhaime. In 2016, he publicly clashed with then Parti Quebecois leadership candidate Paul St-Pierre Plamondon, who told Bock Cote that systemic racism was an long-time issue in Quebec. In 2019, the Quebec premier François Legault was said to be a reader of his book The Empire of Political Correctness. He also was invited by the CAQ youth wing to address them that same year. In 2026, Bock-Côté was critical of an report from the pro-independence group United Organizations for Independence advocating for the separatist movement to be inclusive by arguing that it undermine separatist cause. He stated that those who disagree with his views on immigration and identity issues should not be part of the coalition while targeting progressivism former PQ cabinet minister Louise Harel.

Bock-Côté has been criticized for twisting information on multiple occasions to push his viewpoints. In Quebec, his critics see him as a radical conservative, and he has frequently been accused by them of trying to mainstream the Great Replacement conspiracy theory and of miscontextualizing former Quebec Premier René Lévesque's view on immigration.

== Personal life ==
Bock-Côté is married to journalist, animator, and producer Karima Brikh. He met her on the show she was hosting.

== Works ==
- The Identity City (2007)
- The Quiet Denationalization (2007)
- End of cycle (2012)
- Political exercises (2013)
- Multiculturalism as a political religion (2016)
- The New Regime (2017)
- The Empire of Political Correctness (2019)
- The Racialist Revolution, and Other Ideological Viruses (2021)
