= Réseau Liberté-Québec =

Non-Profit Organization in Quebec, Canada

The Réseau Liberté-Québec (English: Québec Freedom Network) is a non-profit organization aiming to promote libertarian views and ideals in the Canadian province of Quebec. The group, founded during the summer of 2010 by Joanne Marcotte, Éric Duhaime, Roy Eappen, Gérard Laliberté, Ian Sénéchal and Guillaume Leduc, has been compared to the American conservative advocacy movement Tea Party. It disappeared after 2013.

== History ==
In 2010, Joanne Marcotte, Éric Duhaime, Roy Eappen, Gérard Laliberté, Ian Sénéchal founded Réseau Liberté-Québec as way to promote libertarian views and debate the end of Quebec model. Marcotte explained that the intention was not to be a political party but a think tank modelled by the Manning Center for Building Democracy. The founders agree that they do not want to promote the social, moral, or religious right.

From 2010 to 2013, they held conferences in Quebec City in 2010, Montreal in 2011 , Lévis in 2012, and a final one in Trois-Rivières in 2013. Some of the presenters were radio host Jeff Fillion, columnist Mathieu Bock-Côté, founder of the far-right media outlet Rebel News Ezra Levant, economists, Martin Coiteux and Nathalie Elgrably, co-founder of the Montreal Economic Institute (MEI) Adrien Pouliot, politicians Maxime Bernier ,Parti Québécois minister Jacques Brassard, and Gérard Deltell. They tried to invite François Legault and Joseph Facal but were rebuffed. They discussed intergenerational equity, climate change denial, redefining nationalism, the role of the media, and freedom.

Duhaime biographer Frédérick Têtu explained that the group disappeared due to the fact that membership was below 5000 members and division over the Quebec Charter of Values. In the 2021 Conservative Party of Quebec leadership election, the members of the organization played a major role in Duhaime's victory and the ideas expressed during the conference helped shaped the Conservative Party of Quebec platform.
