= Gilles Taillon =

Canadian politician (born 1945)

Leader of the Action démocratique du Québec
- In office October 18, 2009 – November 19, 2009
- Preceded by: Sylvie Roy
- Succeeded by: Gérard Deltell

MNA for Chauveau
- In office April 25, 2007 – November 5, 2008
- Preceded by: Sarah Perreault
- Succeeded by: Gérard Deltell

Personal details
- Born: August 11, 1945 (age 80) Saint-Jérôme, Quebec
- Party: Action démocratique du Québec
- Profession: teacher, businessman

Gilles Taillon (born August 11, 1945) is the former leader of the Action démocratique du Québec (ADQ). A politician, teacher and businessman in Quebec, Canada; he was the ADQ Member of the National Assembly of Quebec (MNA) for the district of Chauveau in the Quebec City area from the 2007 to the 2008 elections.

He was not sitting as an MNA when he was selected as the party's new leader in the Action démocratique du Québec leadership election on October 18, 2009. However, he announced his resignation from that position less than a month later following a caucus revolt.

== Background ==
Taillon was born in Saint-Jérôme, Quebec. He studied at the Université de Montréal from 1967 to 1974 and received a bachelor's degree in arts and literature and a diploma in industrial relations.

Taillon was a teacher in secondary school for 5 years before being an adviser in working relations. He was a director for the Ministry of Education. He was also the operations vice-president for the Commission de la santé et de la sécurité au travail. Taillon also worked as a lecturer at the Université de Sherbrooke.

== Conseil du patronat du Québec ==
Taillon was the president of the Conseil du patronat du Québec from 1998 to 2006. The Conseil du Patronat is the main association for businesspeople across the province. Taillon was also heavily involved in the education sector, serving as general manager for the Sherbrooke school board, the human resources director for the defunct Gamelin school board in Gatineau and vice-president of the Federation des commissions scolaires du Quebec.

== Provincial politics ==
In 2005 Taillon, who had previously been a Liberal supporter, joined the ADQ and served as president of the party from 2006 to 2007.

=== 2007 election ===
In September 2006, Taillon decided to run for provincial politics in the 2007 election as one of the ADQ's star candidates. He was easily elected in the Quebec City area riding of Chauveau with 56% of the vote. Liberal incumbent Sarah Perreault finished second with 22% of the vote.

While Taillon focussed on issues sensitive to the education system, he was among several candidates in favor of abolishing school boards across the province and giving the responsibility to municipalities.

On March 29, 2007, Taillon was appointed deputy leader of the Official Opposition. On April 19, 2007, he was selected to be the Official Opposition's Shadow Minister of Finance.

On April 25, 2008, Parti Québécois leader Pauline Marois tabled a $900,000 lawsuit against Taillon after comments he made in which he linked Marois to the Norbourg financial scandal.

=== 2008 election ===
On October 31, 2008, Taillon announced that he would vacate his Chauveau seat and run for the riding of Chapleau, in the Outaouais region. According to La Presse, Taillon indicated that he was disappointed about politics and wanted to move to Outaouais for personal reasons. Initially, it was rumoured he would run in the riding of Papineau against Liberal Chief Whip Norman MacMillan, before he decided to run in Chapleau, where former provincial Liberal cabinet minister Benoît Pelletier had announced that he did not intend to seek reelection. Taillon lost his bid for election in Chapleau, finishing in third place behind the victorious Liberal, Marc Carrière, and Parti Québécois candidate Yves Morin.

== Leadership campaign ==
Following the resignation of ADQ leader Mario Dumont after the 2008 general election, Taillon announced his candidacy for the leadership. His campaign manager was MNA François Bonnardel.

Taillon was elected leader by two votes cast, over rival Éric Caire. The election result was very controversial, as it was later reported that a television personality, in an on-air stunt, voted in the election under the name of recently deceased Gabonese strongman Omar Bongo. Later reports also revealed that the party president, who was supposed to be neutral in the race, helped raise money and organize for Taillon. Following the narrow victory, Taillon named a new shadow cabinet that did not include a critic's role for his leadership rival, Caire. Caire later resigned from the party to sit as an independent MNA, joined by caucus colleague and supporter Marc Picard.

On November 10, 2009, just 23 days after his election as party leader, Taillon announced a new leadership race, citing the party infighting and alleging irregularities in the party's financial affairs, dating back to 2003, which he had called in the Sûreté du Québec to investigate.

Political offices
Preceded by Sylvie Roy	Leader of the Action démocratique du Québec; 2009	Succeeded by Gérard Deltell
Preceded by François Legault (PQ)	Official Opposition's Shadow Minister of Finance; 2007–2008	Succeeded by François Legault (PQ)
Preceded by Yvon Picotte	President of Action démocratique du Québec; 2006–2007	Succeeded by Tom Pentefountas
Business positions
Preceded by Denis Beauregard	President of Conseil du patronat du Québec; 1998–2006	Succeeded by Michel Kelly-Gagnon
