= Moncef Guitouni =

Canadian sociologist

- Born: 1939; Tunis
- Died: 2011
- Occupation: Psycho-sociologist

Moncef Guitouni (1939–2011, Arabic: المنصف القيطوني) was a psycho-sociologist in Quebec, Canada. He was the president of the ADQ in 1994.

== Early life and education ==
Born and raised in Tunis, French protectorate of Tunisia, he studied in France and moved to Canada in 1968.

== Career ==
Guitouni supported the Liberals in the 1980s and became president of the ADQ in 1994.

During the provincial election campaign of 1994, Radio Canada’s news program Le Point claimed that he had a faked resume, questioned his business practices and likened him to a con artist.

Guitouni was fired on the spot by the ADQ, and many of his customers walked away from his clinics.

The accusations made against him turned out to be wrong. On 2 February 1998, ADQ leader Mario Dumont offered a public apology for having made a rushed decision concerning Guitouni.

On October 10, 2000, the Superior Court of Quebec condemned Radio-Canada for defamation against Guitouni. The broadcaster had to pay $635,355 to the plaintiff.

== Personal life ==
He was married to Agnes Guitouni and never had any children.

On August 19, 2011, Moncef Guitouni died at the age of 72 years.

Party political offices
Preceded by Mario Dumont	President of Action démocratique du Québec; 1994–1994	Succeeded by Hubert Meilleur
