= Tom Pentefountas =

Canadian politician

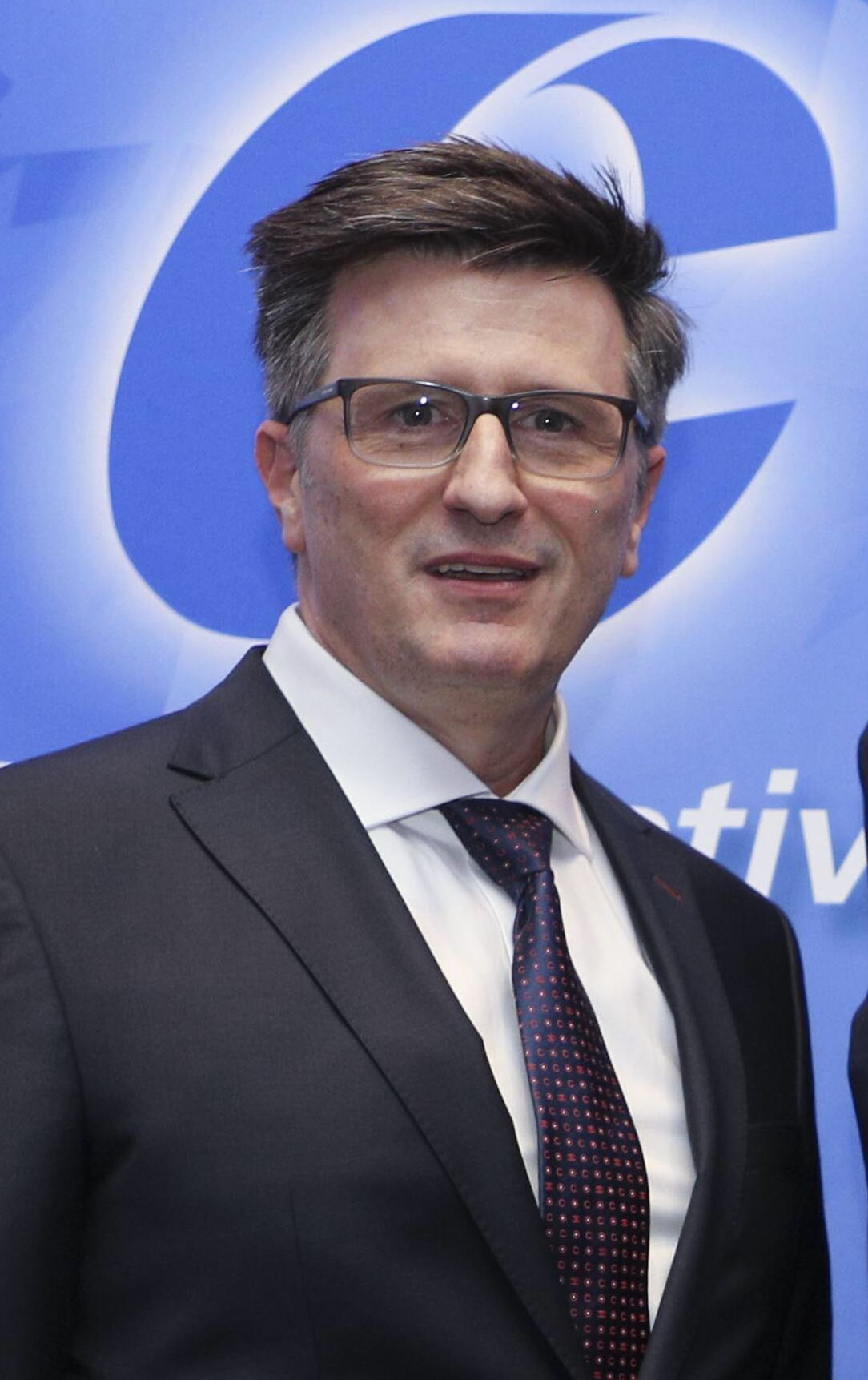

President of the ADQ
- In office September 2007 – December 2008
- Preceded by: Gilles Taillon
- Succeeded by: Mario Charpentier

Personal details
- Party: Conservative (federal); ADQ/CAQ (provincial)
- Occupation: Lawyer, businessperson

Tom Pentefountas was vice-chair of Broadcasting of the CRTC (Canadian Radio-television and Telecommunications Commission), having taken up the post on April 4, 2011 and resigning in November 2015, prior to the end of his five-year term. He served as President of the National Executive Committee of the political party Action démocratique du Québec from September 2007 to December 2008.

== Early life ==
Pentefountas was born and raised in Montréal in the province of Québec. He is of Greek descent and is fluent in English, French, and Greek.

Pentefountas holds a Bachelor of Laws from the University of Ottawa and a Bachelor of Arts (Honours) in Political Science with a minor in Philosophy from Concordia University, where he received the Jean H. Picard Award for Academic Excellence and Leadership and the Thomas H Moore Prize for Academic Excellence. He also earned a certificate in Entertainment Law from Osgoode Hall Law School of York University and a mini MBA from McGill Executive Institute.

He is a member of the Quebec Bar Association.

== Career ==
Pentefountas is a criminal lawyer by trade. From 1996 to 2011, he was with the firm Silver Sandiford and represented clients in Quebec, Ontario, New Brunswick and Nova Scotia. For two years, he hosted a radio show on CKDG-FM Montreal, providing his expertise on human rights, criminal law and the Canadian Charter of Rights and Freedoms. He was also a regular contributor to the "Gang of Four" on CJAD Montreal.

Pentefountas is a member of the Montreal Hellenic Board of Trade since 1998, serving as Vice-President from 2005 to 2007, and of the American Hellenic Educational Progressive Association since 2007.

Pentefountas ran in the Québec provincial by-election on September 20, 2004 in Nelligan for Action démocratique du Québec where he gathered 6.99% of the votes, reaching 4th place.

He was elected President of Action démocratique du Québec in September 2007 and resigned in December 2008 following disastrous results for the party in the provincial election, citing other priorities in life and his wish to return to law practice. During that tenure he ran in the 2008 Quebec general election in Fabre where he gathered 11.93% of the votes, reaching 3rd place.

Pentefountas' appointment as Vice-Chairman of Broadcasting of the CRTC in April 2011 was criticized by the NDP because he lacked broadcasting experience, a requirement for the job, and was a friend of Stephen Harper's spokesman Dimitri Soudas. He resigned his position in November 2015 ahead of the end of his five-year term.

== Electoral record ==
=== Federal ===
2019 Canadian federal election: Laval—Les Îles
| Party | Candidate | Votes | % | ±% | Expenditures |
|---|---|---|---|---|---|
| Liberal | Fayçal El-Khoury | 26,031 | 48.2 | +0.50 | $93,691.28 |
| Bloc Québécois | Nacera Beddad | 11,120 | 20.6 | +8.18 | $1,900.53 |
| Conservative | Tom Pentefountas | 8,816 | 16.3 | -1.80 | none listed |
| New Democratic | Noémia Onofre De Lima | 4,803 | 8.9 | -10.87 | none listed |
| Green | Sari Madi | 2,306 | 4.3 | +2.61 | none listed |
| People's | Marie-Louise Beauchamp | 885 | 1.7 | | $0.00 |
| Total valid votes/expense limit | | 53,961 | 100.0 | | |
| Total rejected ballots | | 840 | | | |
| Turnout | | 54,801 | 65.8 | | |
| Eligible voters | | 83,233 | | | |
| Liberal hold | | Swing | | -3.84 | |
Source: Elections Canada

=== Provincial ===
==== Fabre ====
2008 Quebec general election
| Party | Candidate | Votes | % | ±% |
|---|---|---|---|---|
| Liberal | Michelle Courchesne | 15,349 | 45.50 | |
| Parti Québécois | François-Gycelain Rocque | 12,425 | 36.83 | |
| Action démocratique | Tom Pentefountas | 4,024 | 11.93 | |
| Green | Erika Alvarez | 1,021 | 3.03 | – |
| Québec solidaire | Pierre Brien | 918 | 2.72 | |

==== Nelligan ====
Quebec provincial by-election, September 20, 2004
| Party | Candidate | Votes | % | ±% |
|---|---|---|---|---|
| Liberal | Yolande James | 7,812 | 52.58 | -25.02 |
| Independent | Michel Gibson | 4,038 | 27.18 | – |
| Parti Québécois | Sahar Hawili | 1,538 | 10.35 | -2.46 |
| Action démocratique | Tom Pentefountas | 1,039 | 6.99 | -0.45 |
| Green | Ryan Young | 251 | 1.69 | +0.19 |
| UFP | Josée Larouche | 120 | 0.81 | – |
| Bloc Pot | Blair Longley | 58 | 0.39 | – |
| Total valid votes | | 14,856 | 99.58 | – |
| Total rejected ballots | | 62 | 0.42 | – |
| Turnout | | 14,918 | 28.60 | -41.05 |
| Electors on the lists | | 52,163 | – | – |
