= Montreal Economic Institute =

Canada-based think tank

- Founder: Michel Kelly-Gagnon
- Established: 1987
- CEO: Daniel Dufort
- Staff: 17 (2025)
- Budget: $3.5 million (2024)
- Location: Montreal, Quebec, Canada
- Website: iedm.org

The Montreal Economic Institute (MEI) is a non-profit research organization (or think tank) based in Montreal, Quebec, Canada. It aims at promoting economic liberalism through economic education of the general public and what it regards as efficient public policies in Quebec and Canada via studies and conferences. Its research areas include topics such as health care, education, taxation, labour, agriculture and the environment.

It was founded in 1987 and relaunched in 1998 by Michel Kelly-Gagnon and Adrien D. Pouliot. It has been noted for having ties to Quebec's political right.

== History ==
The MEI was incorporated in July 1987, after being created by a group of Québec intellectuals and businessmen as the continuation of the Institut économique de Paris à Montréal by co-founder economist Pierre Lemieux.

In 1995 in Saint-Eustache, Quebec, Michel Kelly-Gagnon met with four friends: Éric Duhaime, Martin Masse, Lemieux and Pierre Desrochers, a professor of geography at the University of Toronto Mississauga. These five friends agreed on three priorities to advance the libertarian movement in Quebec: to revive the MEI, create Les amis de la liberté (Friends of Liberty), an association serving as a meeting place and to present conferences and to found a magazine which would be Le Québécois Libre.

Kelly-Gagnon alongside Adrien D. Pouliot, who also served as president of MEI and leader of Conservative Party of Quebec from 2013-2020, helped relaunch it in 1998. MEI's activities soared in the late 1990s with the nomination of Kelly-Gagnon as executive director. Kelly-Gagnon served from 1999 to 2006 and from 2009 to 2023 after a brief stint as head of the Quebec Employers Council.

Maxime Bernier served as its vice president, from May to November 2005, before he became federal Minister of Industry. Bernier explained that his role at the Institute was mainly fundraising and act as an advisor to Kelly-Gagnon. MEI is where Bernier met Masse, who worked at MEI while editing Le Québécois Libre. Masse later became an political advisor to Bernier and co-founded the People's Party of Canada with him. Duhamie, who later co-founded Réseau Liberté-Québec and currently is the leader of Conservative Party of Quebec, also worked there.

Several members of its board of directors and many of its fellows play a significant role in Quebec's economy as entrepreneurs or intellectuals. Tasha Kheiriddin also briefly occupied this position from March to September 2006, before moving to the Quebec branch of the Fraser Institute. From February 2007 to October 2009, the vice president was Marcel Boyer, professor of economics at the University of Montreal. The vice president is currently Jasmin Guénette, former director of public affairs who came back after spending two years at the Institute for Humane Studies in Virginia.

Paul Muller was president of the MEI from 2006 to 2012 and former policy adviser to the leader of Action démocratique du Québec, Mario Dumont.

During the 2012 Quebec student protests, the MEI's office was vandalized by militants who disapproved of their positions. The MEI recruited Joe Oliver, the former Minister of Finance in Stephen Harper's Conservative Party of Canada government, as a Distinguished Senior Fellow in 2016.

Youri Chassin, the MEI's research director from 2012 to 2017, was elected as MNA for Saint-Jérôme for the CAQ. Pascale Déry, who worked for MEI became minister of higher education in 2023. In 2026, Florence Plourde, communication director of communications advisor to premier Francois Legault was hired by MEI.

== Description ==
The MEI states that it does not participate in partisan activities. Its public interventions are meant only to analyze the relevance of public policies, their costs and benefits, and their impact on individuals and on private and public organizations.

While it rejects characterizations such as "right-wing" and "libertarian," the MEI advocates policies in line with economic liberalism, such as loosening Quebec’s labour laws, increasing the transparency of labour union financing, merit pay for teachers, and ending Canada Post's monopoly on letter delivery, as well as a general downsizing of the state.

The MEI states that it maintains a separation between its researchers and its donors. According to the MEI's website, publications and videos are not submitted to donors or their representatives for approval or editing before they are released.

== Reputation ==
Commentators often characterize the MEI as Quebec's equivalent to the Fraser Institute and a voice of fiscal conservatism in Quebec. Former MEI vice president Tasha Kheiriddin placed it in the same group as the Fraser Institute as well as the National Citizens Coalition, Frontier Centre for Public Policy, the Canadian Taxpayers Federation, and the Atlantic Institute for Market Studies. An analysis of social networks on Twitter by the Institute for Research on Public Policy found that MEI is one of the Canadian think tanks with the highest "right-wing" scores, along with the Manning Centre, the Frontier Centre for Public Policy, the Canadian Taxpayers Federation, the C.D. Howe Institute, the Canada West Foundation, and the Atlantic Institute for Market Studies.

Another former MEI vice president, Bernier stated the institute influenced him as an Industry Minister by giving him the experience to learn about public policies and how to implement good public policies. While running the Conservative Party of Quebec, both Pouilot and Duhaime has cited information from MEI when developing policies for their party.

The MEI's reasoning was also questioned on several occasions by the Institut de recherche et d'informations socio-économiques,. Ethan Cox, a political organizer and writer, has said that "MEI is part of the same problem they have with money in the U.S. political process: corporate interests who can outspend critics have too much influence in our political process."

Journalist Thomas Laberge, writing En rupture avec l’État, which documents the libertarian movement in Quebec, noted ties between several members of the institute and Le Québécois Libre as either readers or contributors.

== Fellows and associate researchers ==
- James M. Buchanan – Senior Fellow honoraire
- Vernon L. Smith – Senior Fellow honoraire
- Nathalie Elgrably-Lévy – Senior Economist
- Pierre Lemieux – Senior Fellow
- Adam Daifallah – Fellow
- Marie-Josée Loiselle – Fellow
- Etienne Bernier
- Sylvain Charlebois
- J. Edwin Coffey
- Pierre Desrochers
- André Duchesne
- Claude Garcia
- Vincent Geloso
- F. Pierre Gingras
- Ian Irvine
- Pierre J. Jeanniot
- Robert Knox
- Patrick Dery
- Valentin Petkantchin
