= 2005 Sherbrooke municipal election =

The 2005 Sherbrooke municipal election was held on November 6, 2005, to elect a mayor and city councillors in Sherbrooke, Quebec. The communities of Brompton and Lennoxville also elected borough councillors, who do not serve on the city council.

== Results ==
=== Mayor ===
2005 Sherbrooke election, Mayor of Sherbrooke
Candidate	Total votes	% of total votes
(incumbent)Jean Perrault	25,867	54.11
Helene Gravel	20,892	43.70
Hubert Richard	1,047	2.19
Total valid votes	47,806	100.00

=== Councillors ===
2005 Sherbrooke election, Brompton Councillor
Candidate	Total votes	% of total votes
(incumbent)Nicole Bergeron	1,780	69.50
Bernard Guay	781	30.50
Total valid votes	2,561	100.00

2005 Sherbrooke election, Brompton Borough Councillor One
Candidate	Total votes	% of total votes
Benoit Dionne	accl.	.

2005 Sherbrooke election, Brompton Borough Councillor Two
Candidate	Total votes	% of total votes
(incumbent)Michel Lamontagne	accl.	.

2005 Sherbrooke election, Fleurimont Councillor One
Candidate	Total votes	% of total votes
(incumbent)Mariette Fugere	1,484	57.97
Michel Carrier	1,076	42.03
Total valid votes	2,560	100.00

2005 Sherbrooke election, Fleurimont Councillor Two
Candidate	Total votes	% of total votes
(incumbent)Roger Labrecque	accl.	.

2005 Sherbrooke election, Fleurimont Councillor Three
Candidate	Total votes	% of total votes
(incumbent)Francis Gagnon	2,397	90.62
David Lenneville	248	9.38
Total valid votes	2,645	100.00

2005 Sherbrooke election, Fleurimont Councillor Four
Candidate	Total votes	% of total votes
(incumbent)Louida Brochu	1,940	69.86
Noel Richard	837	30.14
Total valid votes	2,777	100.00

2005 Sherbrooke election, Fleurimont Councillor Five
Candidate	Total votes	% of total votes
(incumbent)Bernard Tanguay	accl.	.

2005 Sherbrooke election, Lennoxville Councillor
Candidate	Total votes	% of total votes
(incumbent)Douglas MacAulay	accl.	.

2005 Sherbrooke election, Lennoxville Borough Councillor One
Candidate	Total votes	% of total votes
(incumbent)William Smith	accl.	.

2005 Sherbrooke election, Lennoxville Borough Councillor Two
Candidate	Total votes	% of total votes
(incumbent)Thomas A. Allen	accl.	.

2005 Sherbrooke election, Mont-Bellevue Councillor One
Candidate	Total votes	% of total votes
(incumbent)Serge Paquin	993	71.34
Guillaume Cloutier	399	28.66
Total valid votes	1,392	100.00

2005 Sherbrooke election, Mont-Bellevue Councillor Two
Candidate	Total votes	% of total votes
(incumbent)Robert Y. Pouliot	1,202	60.68
Alexandre Lavallee	460	23.22
Moustapha Saboun	319	16.10
Total valid votes	1,981	100.00

2005 Sherbrooke election, Mont-Bellevue Councillor Three
Candidate	Total votes	% of total votes
(incumbent)Pierre Boisvert	1,852	74.05
Guy Couture	649	25.95
Total valid votes	2,501	100.00

2005 Sherbrooke election, Mont-Bellevue Councillor Four
Candidate	Total votes	% of total votes
(incumbent)Jean-Francois Rouleau	2,149	63.54
Sebastien Aube	1,233	36.46
Total valid votes	3,382	100.00

2005 Sherbrooke election, Forest-Saint-Elie-Deauville Councillor One
Candidate	Total votes	% of total votes
(incumbent)Diane Delisle	1,034	48.87
Laurent Boudreau	622	29.40
Vincent Roselli	460	21.74
Total valid votes	2,116	100.00

2005 Sherbrooke election, Forest-Saint-Elie-Deauville Councillor Two
Candidate	Total votes	% of total votes
(incumbent)Bernard Sevigny	1,307	56.93
Benoit Charland	989	43.07
Total valid votes	2,296	100.00

2005 Sherbrooke election, Forest-Saint-Elie-Deauville Councillor Three
Candidate	Total votes	% of total votes
(incumbent)Serge Forest	1,663	64.13
Alain Demers	690	26.61
Gustavo Atencio	240	9.26
Total valid votes	2,593	100.00

2005 Sherbrooke election, Forest-Saint-Elie-Deauville Councillor Four
Candidate	Total votes	% of total votes
(incumbent)Julien Lachance	1,625	65.50
Pierre Harvey	856	34.50
Total valid votes	2,481	100.00

2005 Sherbrooke election, Jacques-Cartier Councillor One
Candidate	Total votes	% of total votes
(incumbent)Jacques Testulat	2,776	83.49
Geoffrey Bruneau	549	16.51
Total valid votes	3,325	100.00

2005 Sherbrooke election, Jacques-Cartier Councillor Two
Candidate	Total votes	% of total votes
(incumbent)Chantal L'Esperance	1,823	75.18
Jean Chenay	602	24.82
Total valid votes	2,425	100.00

2005 Sherbrooke election, Jacques-Cartier Councillor Three
Candidate	Total votes	% of total votes
(incumbent)Marc Denault	2,427	84.15
Olivier Bergeron	457	15.85
Total valid votes	2,884	100.00

2005 Sherbrooke election, Jacques-Cartier Councillor Four
Candidate	Total votes	% of total votes
(incumbent)Dany Lachance	2,214	72.80
Pierre Tardif	827	27.70
Total valid votes	3,041	100.00

Source: "Meet your new municipal councils," Sherbrooke Record, 7 November 2005, p. 9.
