= 2009 Sherbrooke municipal election =

The 2009 Sherbrooke municipal election was held on November 11, 2009, to elect a mayor and city councillors in Sherbrooke, Quebec. The communities of Brompton and Lennoxville also elected borough councillors, who do not serve on the city council.

== Results ==
=== Mayor ===
2009 Sherbrooke election, Mayor of Sherbrooke
Candidate	Total votes	% of total votes
Bernard Sévigny	17,173	34.42
Hélène Gravel	17,051	34.18
François Godbout	14,190	28.44
Moustapha Saboun	882	1.77
Denis Pellerin	596	1.19
Total valid votes	49,892	100.00

=== Councillors ===
==== Brompton ====
2009 Sherbrooke election, Brompton Councillor
Candidate	Total votes	% of total votes
(incumbent)Nicole Bergeron	accl.	.

2009 Sherbrooke election, Brompton Borough Councillor One
Candidate	Total votes	% of total votes
(incumbent)Benoît Dionne	accl.	.

2009 Sherbrooke election, Brompton Borough Councillor Two
Candidate	Total votes	% of total votes
(incumbent)Michel Lamontagne	accl.	.

==== Fleurimont ====
2009 Sherbrooke election, Fleurimont Councillor One
Candidate	Total votes	% of total votes
(incumbent)Mariette Fugère	1,348	47.57
Hélène Dauphinais	714	25.19
Michel Carrier	645	22.76
Caroline Vohl	127	4.48
Total valid votes	2,834	100.00

2009 Sherbrooke election, Fleurimont Councillor Two
Candidate	Total votes	% of total votes
(incumbent)Roger Labrecque	1,027	40.23
Guy Hardy	773	30.28
Vincent Boutin	617	24.17
Dany Gagné	136	5.33
Total valid votes	2,553	100.00

2009 Sherbrooke election, Fleurimont Councillor Three
Candidate	Total votes	% of total votes
Jean-Guy Demers	1,653	59.85
Carroll Lauzon	878	31.79
Valérie Roy	231	8.36
Total valid votes	2,762	100.00

2009 Sherbrooke election, Fleurimont Councillor Four
Candidate	Total votes	% of total votes
(incumbent)Louida Brochu	1,549	52.37
Marc Bellemare	730	24.68
Martin Langlois	490	16.57
Nicole Grondin-Gaumond	143	4.83
Nick Watson	46	1.56
Total valid votes	2,958	100.00

2009 Sherbrooke election, Fleurimont Councillor Five
Candidate	Total votes	% of total votes
Rémi Demers	1,541	60.24
Bianca Battistini	1,017	39.76
Total valid votes	2,558	100.00

==== Lennoxville ====
2009 Sherbrooke election, Lennoxville Councillor
Candidate	Total votes	% of total votes
David Price	1,203	62.43
Tom Allen	372	19.30
Louise Brisson	295	15.31
Steve A. Côté	57	2.96
Total valid votes	1,927	100.00

2009 Sherbrooke election, Lennoxville Borough Councillor One
Candidate	Total votes	% of total votes
(incumbent)William Smith	565	52.41
Robert Salesse	513	47.59
Total valid votes	1,078	100.00

2009 Sherbrooke municipal election: Lennoxville Borough Councillor Two
Candidate	Votes	%
Mark McLaughlin	298	37.48
Alan L. Ansell	149	18.74
Heather Keith	118	14.84
Norman Green	95	11.95
Mohamed Adjel	69	8.68
Bernard Rodrigue	66	8.30
Total valid votes	795	100.00

- Mark McLaughlin is a former vice-president of finance and administration of Bishop's University. He supported a tuition fee increase in April 2007, and in July of the same year he submitted a report that the institution was facing "an exceptional financial crisis." He moved to Lennoxville in 2002 and has served on the board of the Townshippers' Association. In the 2009 election, he promised that he would work to preserve his community's anglophone character and maintain its bilingual status. He wrote a public letter in 2010, opposing suggestions that the Brompton and Lennoxville borough councils should be eliminated; rather, he argues, they should be a model for other boroughs throughout the city.
- Alan L. Ansell moved to Lennoxville in 1972. He worked for thirty-two years at Bishop's University, where he was coordinator of athletic facilities and chair of the environment and land-use committee; at the time of the 2009 election, he was retired. He highlighted sustainability and transport issues and said that he would work to defend Lennoxville's linguistic character.
- Norman Green is a customer service agent. He called for greater diligence in the delivery of municipal services, noting that his family did not receive timely warnings about a water boiling advisory. He also highlighted safety issues and said that he would revive the community's moribund Neighbourhood Watch program.
- Mohamed Adjel is a technician. He arrived in Sherbrooke in 1987 and moved to Lennoxville from the Sherbrooke East borough in 1996. In the 2009 campaign, he promised to uphold the community's anglophone character.
- Bernard Rodrigue is an entrepreneur born in Lennoxville. He ran for the second borough seat in 2001 and 2009, losing both on both occasions. Fifty years old in 2001, he said that he would extend his community's infrastructure and protect its community's bilingual status.

==== Mont-Bellevue ====
2009 Sherbrooke election, Mont-Bellevue Councillor One
Candidate	Total votes	% of total votes
(incumbent)Serge Paquin	1,008	65.84
Mariame Cissé	314	20.51
Hubert Richard	209	13.65
Total valid votes	1,531	100.00

2009 Sherbrooke election, Mont-Bellevue Councillor Two
Candidate	Total votes	% of total votes
(incumbent)Robert Y. Pouliot	accl.	.

2009 Sherbrooke election, Mont-Bellevue Councillor Three
Candidate	Total votes	% of total votes
(incumbent)Pierre Boisvert	1,621	68.63
Colette Bernier	528	22.35
Benoit Bergeron	213	9.02
Total valid votes	2,362	100.00

2009 Sherbrooke election, Mont-Bellevue Councillor Four
Candidate	Total votes	% of total votes
(incumbent)Jean-François Rouleau	2,352	71.49
Jean-Marc Rozon	667	20.27
Isabelle Morin	271	8.24
Total valid votes	3,290	100.00

==== Rock Forest–Saint-Élie–Deauville ====
2009 Sherbrooke election, Rock-Forest-Saint-Elie-Deauville Councillor One
Candidate	Total votes	% of total votes
(incumbent)Diane Délisle	1,539	75.78
Kévin Côté	492	24.22
Total valid votes	2,031	100.00

2009 Sherbrooke election, Rock-Forest-Saint-Elie-Deauville Councillor Two
Candidate	Total votes	% of total votes
Bruno Vachon	1,669	62.44
Denis Veilleux	796	29.78
Guy Bissonnette	208	7.78
Total valid votes	2,673	100.00

2009 Sherbrooke election, Rock-Forest-Saint-Elie-Deauville Councillor Three
Candidate	Total votes	% of total votes
(incumbent)Serge Forest	1,795	54.94
André Proulx	1,351	41.35
Antoine Hellebuyck	121	3.70
Total valid votes	3,267	100.00

2009 Sherbrooke election, Rock-Forest-Saint-Elie-Deauville Councillor Four
Candidate	Total votes	% of total votes
(incumbent)Julien Lachance	1,891	71.22
Alexandre Blanchette	764	28.78
Total valid votes	2,655	100.00

- Julien Lachance was born on March 7, 1959, in Sherbrooke. He has a Bachelor's degree in finance and an Executive Master of Business Administration degree, and has worked as an insurance broker and financial advisor. He was first elected to the Sherbrooke city council in 2001, defeating incumbent councillor Marie-Paule Samson. In February 2002, he was appointed to Mayor Jean Perrault's executive committee. He opposed efforts to de-amalgamate Sherbrooke in 2004. Re-elected over Pierre Harvey in 2005, Lachance was the only incumbent re-appointed to Perrault's executive committee after the campaign. He supported a new mall in his community in 2009. After being elected to a third term in 2009, Lachance was chosen as borough president for Rock-Forest-St-Elie-Deauville.

==== Jacques-Cartier ====
2009 Sherbrooke election, Jacques-Cartier Councillor One
Candidate	Total votes	% of total votes
Nathalie Goguen	1,309	39.22
Marcel Fabi	1,101	32.98
Denis Beaudoin	812	24.33
Sébastien Côrriveau	116	3.48
Total valid votes	3,338	100.00

2009 Sherbrooke election, Jacques-Cartier Councillor Two
Candidate	Total votes	% of total votes
(incumbent)Chantal L'Espérance	1,620	59.38
Maryse Ruel	901	33.03
Samuel Pépin	207	7.59
Total valid votes	2,728	100.00

2009 Sherbrooke election, Jacques-Cartier Councillor Three
Candidate	Total votes	% of total votes
(incumbent)Marc Denault	2,426	78.06
Marc Boulianne	328	10.55
André Larkin	202	6.50
Dominique Baert	97	3.12
Benjamin Zielinski	55	1.77
Total valid votes	3,108	100.00

2009 Sherbrooke election, Jacques-Cartier Councillor Four
Candidate	Total votes	% of total votes
Pierre Tardif	964	32.47
Gaston Leroux	874	29.44
Sylvie Proulx	787	26.51
Charles Tardif	225	7.58
Sébastien Fortin	119	4.01
Total valid votes	2,969	100.00

Source: Résultants 2009, Élections municipales 2009, Le Directeur général des élections du Québec.
