= Hubert Meilleur =

Canadian politician

Hubert Meilleur is a politician from Quebec, Canada. Meilleur was the mayor of Mirabel.

== Mayor ==
He was first elected as mayor in 1987 and was re-elected in 1991, 1995, 1999, 2003 and 2007. Under his tenure, Mirabel's population increased, going from 15,000 to 34,000. As mayor, Meilleur opposed the decision, announced in December 2006 by the government of Prime Minister Stephen Harper, to return 4,450 hectares of farmland expropriated in 1969 to build Mirabel airport.

== Provincial politics ==
Meilleur and his wife Ritha Cossette each served as president of the ADQ.

Meilleur ran for a seat at the National Assembly in 1994 in the district of Argenteuil. He finished third with 18% of the vote. Liberal candidate Régent Beaudet won the election with 43% of the vote.

Meilleur ran again in 2003 in the new district of Mirabel. He finished second with 34% of the vote. PQ candidate Denise Beaudoin won with 38%.

Around 2004, Meilleur and Cossette left the ADQ and joined the Liberals. In 2007, they expressed disappointment over the fact that the Liberals lost their majority in the legislature and claimed that they had made the decision to stay out of provincial politics.

However, Cossette ran in the district of Mirabel in the 2007 and 2008 elections. She was defeated both times, finishing a distant third with only 16% of the vote the first time and ending second with 23% of the vote on her second attempt.

== Footnotes ==
Party political offices
| Preceded by Moncef Guitouni | President of Action démocratique du Québec; 1994–1996 | Succeeded by Jean Dion |
