= Action démocratique du Québec =

- Founders: Jean Allaire; Mario Dumont
- Founded: January 6, 1994
- Dissolved: January 21, 2012
- Split from: Quebec Liberal Party
- Merged into: Coalition Avenir Québec
- Headquarters: 740 rue Saint-Maurice, Suite 108, Montreal, Quebec, H3C 1L5
- Ideology: Quebec nationalism; Quebec autonomism; Conservatism (Canadian); Economic liberalism; Right-wing populism
- Political position: Centre-right to right-wing
- Colours: Blue and red (unofficial)

The Action démocratique du Québec ([aksjɔ̃ demɔkʁatik dy kebɛk], lit. 'Democratic Action of Quebec'), commonly referred to as the ADQ, (Note: While some journalists have translated the name into English as Democratic Action of Quebec, it has no official English name; it is normally referred to by its French name in the English-language media, or simply as "the ADQ".) was a right-wing populist and conservative provincial political party in Quebec, Canada. On the sovereignty question, it defined itself as autonomist; it had support from nationalists and federalists. Its members were referred to as adéquistes, a name derived from the French pronunciation of the initials 'ADQ'.

The party was founded by dissidents of the Quebec Liberal Party who did not accept the Charlottetown Accord, and first contested the 1994 provincial election, electing Mario Dumont to the National Assembly. Under longtime leader Dumont, the ADQ had a strong showing in the 2007 provincial election, reducing the ruling Quebec Liberal Party (PLQ) to a minority government and relegating the Parti Québécois (PQ) to third place. The ADQ won 41 seats with 31% of the popular vote to serve as the Official Opposition in the National Assembly. However, the ADQ's popularity declined significantly soon afterward and in the 2008 provincial elections, the party failed to secure at least twenty percent of the popular vote or twelve Members of the National Assembly (MNAs) in the last election, and consequently lost official party status, though in early 2009 it was recognised as an official party by the PLQ and the PQ.

On 21 January 2012, the membership approved a merger with the Coalition Avenir Québec. The merger was recognised by the Directeur général des élections du Québec on 14 February 2012.

== History ==
=== Foundation and first decade: 1994–2002 ===
Action démocratique du Québec logo (1994–98)

The party was formed in 1994 by a group of nationalists, known as les allairistes, that supported the Allaire Report, a document that advocated a decentralized federal system in which the provincial Government of Quebec would have significantly increased powers.

After the failure of the Meech Lake Accord, which made many Québécois feel rejected by the rest of Canada, the Liberals adopted the Allaire Report as their constitutional policy. However, the party later chose the Charlottetown Accord over the Allaire Report in 1992. The Charlottetown Accord would have recognized Quebec as a "distinct society" within Canada, but consisted of a much milder reform of the Canadian federal system. While most Liberals supported the Charlottetown Accord, a number of them opposed it and quit the party.

Led by Jean Allaire, an attorney from Laval and author of the Allaire Report, and Mario Dumont, a rising political star who had been President of the Liberal Youth Commission, the dissidents founded the ADQ. Allaire became the first party leader, but resigned within a few months for health reasons. He was succeeded by Mario Dumont, who retained the leadership until early 2009.

Shortly before the 1994 provincial election, Yvon Lafrance, a one-term Liberal backbencher who served under Premier Robert Bourassa, switched parties to join the ADQ, becoming the party's first sitting member of the legislature. In the ensuing election campaign, Dumont took part in the televised leaders debate and was elected as an MNA, but could not expand his electoral support significantly enough to get other party members elected. For the next eight years, he was the ADQ's lone MNA.

In the 1995 Quebec referendum on the Parti Québécois government's proposals for sovereignty, Dumont campaigned for the "Yes" side, in favour of the sovereignty option. However, in subsequent election campaigns, he has promised a moratorium on the sovereignty question, which earned him accusations of not having a clear and honest stand on the constitution question.

Although Dumont was a very popular leader, support for the ADQ always lagged well behind him. In fact, for many years, the ADQ tried to capitalize on Dumont's personal popularity by using the official name Action démocratique du Québec-Équipe Mario Dumont (Action démocratique du Québec-Team Mario Dumont).

=== Rise: 2002 ===
In April and June 2002, voter dissatisfaction with both the Parti Québécois (PQ) government of Bernard Landry and the Liberal alternative presented by Jean Charest led the ADQ to an unexpected victory in a series of by-elections, bringing the party caucus to five members.

After the by-election wins, the ADQ soared in popularity, leading the established parties in public opinion polling for the first time in its existence. For a brief period, a number of political analysts predicted that the ADQ could gather as much as 42% of the vote and more than 80 seats in the National Assembly, which would have been enough for a strong majority.

The increased popularity of the party provided the ADQ with larger grassroots support, more money and star candidates for the subsequent election. Dumont, who was able to recruit Beauce businessman Marcel Dutil, chairman of Groupe Canam Inc. as director of the ADQ's fund-raising activities, was considered as a serious candidate for the office of Premier of Quebec for the first time.

=== Retreat: 2002–2003 ===
As a result of the ADQ attaining greater popular support, its political opponents conducted negative campaigning against the ADQ for the first time. Those efforts were successful in damaging the public perception of the party. Moreover, the party's repeated backtracking on its various policies, including a flat rate income tax of 20 per cent, may have appeared opportunist and harmed the party's image as a viable alternative. It was also revealed that a close advisor of Mario Dumont had a criminal record, which prompted the media to question Dumont's judgment.

The popularity of the ADQ declined. Dumont did not make any major mistake during the televised leaders' debate, but did not deliver the outstanding performance he needed to gain momentum. By contrast, Quebec Liberal leader Jean Charest was able to put Bernard Landry of the Parti Québécois on the defensive.

The ADQ received 18% of the vote at the 2003 provincial election. All ADQ incumbents and star candidates, except Dumont, were defeated. The losses were compensated by the election of three new ADQ MNAs, who were still unknown at the provincial level but were well established in their communities. The ADQ drew enough votes from previous PQ supporters to give the victory to Jean Charest's Liberals, but did not make a significant breakthrough in the National Assembly.

=== Resurgence: 2003–2007 ===
In the months that followed the election, the ADQ benefited from anger over the decision of the Canadian Radio-television and Telecommunications Commission (CRTC) not to renew the license of Quebec City radio station CHOI-FM. Radio host Jeff Fillion urged listeners to vote for ADQ candidate Sylvain Légaré in a by-election for the local district of Vanier. Légaré defended the station's freedom of speech and was elected on September 20, 2004, which raised the number of ADQ seats back to five.

A few days later, the ADQ held a convention in Drummondville, where its members adopted the new constitutional position of the ADQ, which was labeled as autonomist without much precision on what it actually means. ADQ members also elected ex-Liberal minister Yvon Picotte as President of the ADQ, a job previously held by political analyst Guy Laforest.

In the January 2006 federal election, ten Conservative Members of Parliament were elected in Quebec, at the federal level. Four of those newly elected federal Members of Parliament – Maxime Bernier, Steven Blaney, Jacques Gourde and Josée Verner – came from districts represented by ADQ members at the provincial level. All except Bernier were at one point ADQ activists. Blaney was ADQ candidate in Beauce-Nord in 1998. This breakthrough prepared the ground the subsequent growth of the ADQ, which could rely on a number of supporters from the modest Conservatives' organization in Quebec.

In May 2006, the ADQ held a general council (French: conseil général) in Granby, where Dumont brought up the subject of having the current federal Conservative government broach the subject of a new round of constitutional talks in order to get Quebec to finally sign the Constitution.

Embarrassing comments were made by party president Yvon Picotte about PQ Leader André Boisclair. Boisclair had decided not to run in a by-election for the district of Sainte-Marie–Saint-Jacques in Montreal, the district where he lives and which includes Montreal's Gay Village. Accusing Boisclair of being a coward, Picotte jokingly said that the riding would fit Boisclair, who is openly gay, like a glove (comme un gant). Many journalists criticized Picotte, saying his comment sounded homophobic. Within days, Picotte apologized.

In November 2006, the ADQ held its sixth party convention. The next month, it adopted its platform for the 2007 election, entitled "A Plan A for Quebec" ("Un plan A pour le Québec") and defined its stance on the controversial reasonable accommodation debate, which was well received by a substantial number of voters.

=== 2007 provincial election ===
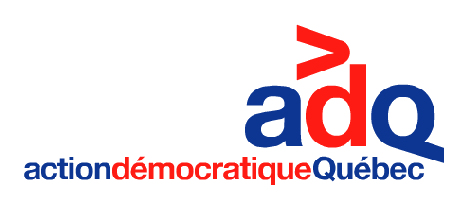
Action démocratique du Québec logo, (2007-2009)

When the 2007 election campaign started, the ADQ was running only a few candidates with widespread name recognition and lacked the financial resources its rivals (especially the Liberals) had. Marcel Dutil announced that even though he likes Dumont, he would vote strategically in favour of the Liberals.

However, polls showed that the ADQ had the potential to significantly increase its representation in the National Assembly. Dumont ran an effective campaign, unveiling one plank from his electoral platform every day and therefore benefiting from sustained attention from his opponents and the media.

Dumont's performance had its own setbacks, however, as it led to more scrutiny of the ADQ.

The Liberals criticized the ADQ's financial plan as vague and unrealistic, accusing Dumont of underestimating its total cost. According to them, the ADQ's promises totaled $6.3 billion rather than the $1.7 billion announced by Dumont.

Besides, many journalists accused the ADQ of being a one-man show. Two candidates, who had made inappropriate comments, were dropped by the party from the election.

On election day, the ADQ made a surprisingly strong showing. It took 21 seats from the Quebec Liberal Party and 15 seats from the PQ. All five ADQ incumbents were re-elected, for a total of 41 seats. (The election of so many legislators without prior parliamentary experience led cartoonist Serge Chapleau to portray the ADQ MNAs as elementary school kids with Dumont as their teacher.) The reigning Liberals were reduced to a minority government, with only 48 MNAs.

For the first time, the ADQ received a plurality of the popular vote among Francophones and formed the official opposition.

Nonetheless, it failed to take a single seat on the island of Montreal, but it did come second in many of the city's ridings.

=== Official Opposition ===
The ADQ MNAs and supporters met in Victoriaville in late September 2007 to detail the party's environmental policy. Former PQ Cabinet Member Jean Garon, former Hydro-Québec CEO André Caillé and environmental activist Steven Guilbeault attended the convention. Tom Pentefountas, a former ADQ candidate in the district of Nelligan in a 2004 by-election, succeeded Gilles Taillon as President of the party. Pentefountas enjoys little name recognition among voters in general, but he is a member of the Greek community and lives in Montreal. ADQ supporters hope that his profile might facilitate the party's attempts to connect with these constituencies.

During the year that followed the 2007 election, a number of ADQ members such as Éric Caire, Gilles Taillon and especially Sébastien Proulx emerged as effective and articulate legislators. Nonetheless, according to journalist Gilbert Lavoie, the more experienced PQ caucus was better able to position itself as the best alternative to Jean Charest's Liberals. Political observers made unflattering comments about the ADQ's performance, and political support for the party seemed to lose momentum again. The ADQ suffered a major setback in 2008, losing four consecutive by-elections by substantial margins. Its support did not exceed 15% in any of the districts at stake. Furthermore, MNAs Pierre-Michel Auger and André Riedl, as well as power broker Yvon Picotte, switched political affiliation from ADQ to Liberal in October 2008.

==== 2008 federal election ====
ADQ Leader Mario Dumont made no official endorsement in the 2008 federal election. He said that he would vote Conservative, but claimed that his colleagues and party's supporters were free to support whoever they wanted. MNAs Pierre Gingras, Ginette Grandmont, Linda Lapointe, Lucie Leblanc and Sébastien Proulx campaigned on behalf of the Conservative Party of Canada's candidates. Yet, the election provided no increase in membership for Quebec's Conservative delegation to Parliament.

=== 2008 provincial election ===
Quebec premier Jean Charest subsequently called a snap election for December 8, 2008. Polls indicated that the ADQ entered the campaign far behind the governing Liberals and the PQ.

The party was routed in this election, falling to seven seats, six of whom were incumbents. This was five seats short of official status in the legislature. While giving his concession speech, Dumont announced that he would not be the leader of his party for the subsequent election.

While political commentators wondered whether the ADQ would survive Dumont's departure, there were three candidates for the 2009 leadership election. On February 27, 2009, Sylvie Roy was named the interim leader of the party.

=== By-election loss of Dumont's seat ===
The ADQ candidate came in third place in a June 21, 2009 by-election to fill the Rivière-du-Loup seat that Dumont vacated when he resigned from the National Assembly. Dumont had held the seat for 14 years; he had carried it in the 2008 provincial election with over 50% of the vote, compared to the less than 15% garnered by ADQ candidate Gilberte Côté. The loss reduced the ADQ to six seats in the National Assembly.

=== 2009 leadership elections ===
In 2009, MNA Éric Caire, former MNA and former party president Gilles Taillon, and former MNA Christian Lévesque ran for the party leadership to succeed Dumont. MNA François Bonnardel also considered entering the contest, but decided to manage Taillon's campaign. Myriam Taschereau, a former federal Conservative candidate, and director of communications in the Prime Minister's Office, had also declared she would run, but later withdrew and endorsed Caire.

On October 18, 2009, Taillon was elected leader on the second ballot by the slim margin of 50.03% of ballots cast, two votes more than runner-up Caire. Lévesque had been eliminated after finishing third on the first ballot.

On November 6, 2009, Caire and supporter Marc Picard left the party, alleging that the party organization lacked transparency and that Taillon had a dictatorial style of leadership. They resigned from caucus to sit as independents. This reduced the size of the ADQ caucus to four seats in the National Assembly.

On November 10, 2009, 23 days after his election as party leader, Taillon announced a new leadership election, citing the party infighting and alleging irregularities in the party's financial affairs, dating back to 2003, which he had called in the Sûreté du Québec to investigate. It was later revealed that he never contacted the Sûreté du Québec. He then explained that he would remain the leader until the results of a new leadership election, in which he would not be a candidate. Caire said he would not run again for the party leadership, adding "Mr. Taillon has done irreparable damage to the ADQ... I don't know how the party will recover from this. I can't see the party going through a second leadership race. The last one almost destroyed us."

On November 19, 2009, the party executive acclaimed Gérard Deltell as the party's leader. After Deltell assumed the leadership, the party enjoyed a modest rebound, rising from 5% in the polls in spring 2010 to 15% by the end of the year, and enjoying a substantial lead in the Quebec City region. The party maintained the level of support it had had in the 2008 election in the by-elections held in Saint-Laurent and Kamouraska-Temiscouata in fall 2010. The ADQ held a convention on November 13, 2010, adopting a number of proposals dealing with democratic reform and anti-corruption measures. Deltell received a 97% vote of confidence from the party membership and received considerable attention when, in his opening address, he referred to Premier Jean Charest as the "godfather of the Liberal family". Charest threatened legal action if the statement was not retracted. Deltell refused to apologize or issue a retraction and no action was taken.

=== 2012 dissolution and merger ===
After Deltell took over the leadership, the party recovered from its precarious position, to a solid 18 percent of support in the opinion polls. The ADQ recovery was at the expense of the Liberals because of Charest's unpopularity; after that, Charest recovered, but the ADQ benefited from a loss of support for the PQ following the collapse of the Bloc Québécois on the federal stage and internal dissent.

After former PQ minister François Legault established a new movement called the Coalition pour l'avenir du Québec in February 2011, as an alternative to the sovereignty movement, there were calls for the ADQ to merge with it because of their similar policies. Polls suggested the new movement would win a plurality of seats at the next election with 35 percent, with the ADQ taking eight percent if they did not merge. On 14 November 2011, Legault officially launched the movement as a new political party under the slightly modified name of Coalition Avenir Québec (CAQ).

On December 14, 2011, the ADQ announced it had agreed to merge with the CAQ, pending final approval from the party membership. On January 21, 2012, the ADQ membership approved the merger of their party with the CAQ, with 70% of the party membership voting to merge. The remaining ADQ MNAs, all of which supported the merger, were expected to join the larger CAQ caucus in the National Assembly, increasing the CAQ caucus size to nine members and increasing the pressure on Charest to call an election. On 22 January 2012, the results of the mail-in vote were announced, with 70% of ADQ members approving the merger with the CAQ. In mid-December, after the parties had agreed in principle to merge, two former ADQ MNAs who had left to sit as independents joined the CAQ.

The four MNAs where were still members of the ADQ at the party's dissolution–Deltell, Sylvie Roy, Janvier Grondin and Francois Bonnardel–joined the existing five person CAQ caucus which was made up of other former ADQ and PQ MNAs.

Deltell served as the CAQ's parliamentary leader until Legault returned to the legislature in 2012.

As of 2025, Bonnardel & Caire are the last parliamentary survivors of the ADQ; Bonnardel was elected in the ADQ's 2007 surge and joined Legault's cabinet when the CAQ won government at the 2018 election, while Caire joined the CAQ in 2011 after two years as an independent. Caire will retire from the National Assembly at the 2026 election.

== Ideology ==
The ADQ advocated liberal economics reforms, or neoliberalism, coupled with support for increased autonomy for Quebec deriving from Quebec nationalism. On the political spectrum of Quebec, the ADQ was to the political right of the Quebec Liberal Party and the Parti Québécois. The ADQ advocated the autonomy of individuals, the autonomy of municipal governments, and the autonomy of Quebec within Canada.

- Fiscal Responsibility: reducing government spending by scaling back Quebec's civil service, in order to balance the budget and pay the provincial debt;
- Education: lifting freezes on college tuition and abolishing school boards;
- Electoral reform: implementing an election reform in which the Premier of Quebec would be elected by popular vote (i.e., a presidential government) and 50 of Quebec's 125 legislature seats would be determined by proportional representation;
- Health care: encouraging private healthcare delivery, in order to reduce the burden on Quebec's public healthcare system;
- Immigration: "reasonable accommodation" granted to immigrants, preventing cultural communities from interfering with a number of mainstream values of the Quebec society, such as women's rights;
- Labour: erasing mandatory dues for nonmembers of trade union and forcing the secret vote;
- Relations with the Federal Government: re-opening constitutional talks and increasing Quebec's autonomy within Canada, without holding another Quebec referendum;
- Tax Reform: extensively restructuring the Quebec tax system, and lowering taxes overall.

In later years, the ADQ abandoned a number of radical free market proposals, including issuing school vouchers to give parents the ability to pay for the education of their children at a school of their choice. Furthermore, the ADQ's conservatism was not based on religious values.

== Electoral support ==
Socially and geographically, the core support of the ADQ was similar to that of the Ralliement créditiste, the provincial wing of the Social Credit Party in the 1962, and 1963 federal elections and the 1970 provincial election, the Union Nationale in the 1976 provincial election and the Conservative Party of Canada in 2006 federal election.

Its strongest base was provided by Chaudière-Appalaches and Québec, the most conservative regions of Quebec. The party's popularity also reached other predominantly French-speaking areas of the province, including Mauricie, Bas-Saint-Laurent, Centre-du-Québec and even Montérégie in the 2007 provincial election.

However, the ADQ had more difficulty breaking through in Gaspésie–Îles-de-la-Madeleine, Outaouais and the more cosmopolitan urban districts of the Montreal area.

Because of the polarization of the debate over constitution from 1970 to 1995, conservative voters often limited their choice between the Quebec Liberal Party or the Parti Québécois. However, a number of commentators claim that resentment of the rest of Quebec against Montreal's perceived hegemony, general mistrust towards current office holders, taxpayers' frustration and constitutional fatigue let a cultural gap in Quebec society become more apparent and provided a window of opportunity for the ADQ to grow.

== Leaders ==
Leader	Home region	Years of service	Background
Jean Allaire	Laval	1994	Lawyer
Mario Dumont	Bas-Saint-Laurent	1994–2009	Economist
Sylvie Roy (interim)	Chaudière-Appalaches	2009	Lawyer
Gilles Taillon	Laurentides	2009	Teacher and businessperson
Gérard Deltell	Capitale-Nationale	2009–2012	Television correspondent

== Presidents ==
President	Years
Mario Dumont	1994
Moncef Guitouni	1994
Hubert Meilleur	1994–1996
Jean Dion	1996–1998
Ritha Cossette	1998–2000
Isabelle Marquis	2000–2002
Guy Laforest	2002–2004
Yvon Picotte	2004–2006
Gilles Taillon	2006–2007
Tom Pentefountas	2007–2008
Mario Charpentier	2008–2009
Christian Lévesque	2009–2012

== Presidents of Youth Commission ==
The Youth Commission of the ADQ was created in August 1995.

President	Years	
1	Éric Boisselle	1994–1996
2	Patrick Robitaille	1996
3	Sylvain Frenette	1996–1997
4	Jean-François Tétrault	1997
5	Jean-Sébastien Brault	n/a
6	Marie-Ève Bonneville	1999–2000
7	Stéphanie Deslandes	n/a
8	Keven Tremblay	n/a
9	Jean-François Sylvestre	2001–2002
10	Stéphane Laforest	2002–2003
11	Micaël Bérubé	2003–2004
12	Simon-Pierre Diamond	2004–2007
13	Catherine Goyer	2007–2009
14	Martin-Karl Bourbonnais	2009–2010
15	Denis Claveau	2010–2012

== Members of the National Assembly ==
MNA	District	Region	Years of service Within Caucus	Background
Pierre-Michel Auger	Champlain	Mauricie	2007–2008	Teacher
Pascal Beaupré	Joliette	Lanaudière	2007–2008	Lawyer
François Benjamin	Berthier	Lanaudière	2007–2008	Mayor of Mandeville, Quebec
Hubert Benoît	Montmorency	Québec	2007–2008	Financial adviser
François Bonnardel	Shefford	Montérégie	2007–2012	Businessperson
Éric Caire	La Peltrie	Québec	2007–2009	Computer programmer and analyst
Martin Camirand	Prévost	Laurentides	2007–2008	Council member in Saint-Jérôme, Quebec
Éric Charbonneau	Johnson	Eastern Townships	2007–2008	Scheduler in a manufacturing business
François Corriveau	Saguenay	Côte-Nord	2002–2003	Sculptor and assistant clerk of court
Jean Damphousse	Maskinongé	Mauricie	2007–2008	Business consultant and mayor of Sainte-Ursule, Quebec
Gérard Deltell	Chauveau	Québec	2008–2012	Television correspondent
Albert De Martin	Huntingdon	Montérégie	2007–2008	Farmer and councillor in Godmanchester, Quebec
Robert Deschamps	Saint-Maurice	Mauricie	2007–2008	Safety manager
François Desrochers	Mirabel	Laurentides	2007–2008	Teacher
Simon-Pierre Diamond	Marguerite-D'Youville	Montérégie	2007–2008	Law student
Jean Domingue	Bellechasse	Chaudière-Appalaches	2007–2008	Project manager
Éric Dorion	Nicolet-Yamaska	Centre-du-Québec	2007–2008	Director of an addiction intervention centre
Mario Dumont	Rivière-du-Loup	Bas-Saint-Laurent	1994–2009	Economist
Raymond Francœur	Portneuf	Québec	2007–2008	Mayor of Sainte-Christine-d'Auvergne, Quebec
François Gaudreau	Vimont	Laval	2002–2003	Realtor and coffee merchant
Pierre Gingras	Blainville	Laurentides	2007–2008	Mayor of Blainville, Quebec
Jean-François Gosselin	Jean-Lesage	Québec	2007–2008	Sales and development manager
Ginette Grandmont	Masson	Lanaudière	2007–2008	Business manager
Marie Grégoire	Berthier	Lanaudière	2002–2003	Marketing consultant
Janvier Grondin	Beauce-Nord	Chaudière-Appalaches	2003–2012	Mayor of Saint-Jules, Quebec
Yvon Lafrance	Iberville	Montérégie	1994–1994	Army officer
Linda Lapointe	Groulx	Laurentides	2007–2008	Business owner
Éric Laporte	L'Assomption	Lanaudière	2007–2008	Financial adviser
Lucie Leblanc	Deux-Montagnes	Laurentides	2007–2008	Mayor of Sainte-Marthe-sur-le-Lac, Quebec
Claude L'Écuyer	Saint-Hyacinthe	Montérégie	2007–2008	Lawyer
Sylvain Légaré	Vanier	Québec	2004-2008	Financial Consultant
Sylvie Lespérance	Joliette	Lanaudière	2002–2003	Nurse and health provider
Christian Lévesque	Lévis	Chaudière-Appalaches	2007-2008	Businessperson and president of the Lévis Chamber of Commerce
Richard Merlini	Chambly	Montérégie	2007–2008	Project manager
Lucille Méthé	Saint-Jean	Montérégie	2007–2008	Development officer
Claude Morin	Beauce-Sud	Chaudière-Appalaches	2007–2008	Financial adviser
Catherine Morissette	Charlesbourg	Québec	2007–2008	Lawyer
Marc Picard	Chutes-de-la-Chaudière	Chaudière-Appalaches	2003–2009	Tax audit technician, finance officer and tax research officer with Revenu Québec
Sébastien Proulx	Trois-Rivières	Mauricie	2007–2008	Lawyer and political consultant
André Riedl	Iberville	Montérégie	2007–2008	Project manager
Jean-François Roux	Arthabaska	Centre-du-Québec	2007–2008	Project manager
Claude Roy	Montmagny-L'Islet	Chaudière-Appalaches	2007–2008	Businessperson and television host
Sylvie Roy	Lotbinière	Chaudière-Appalaches	2003–2012	Lawyer and mayor of Sainte-Sophie-de-Lévrard, Quebec
Monique Roy Verville	La Prairie	Montérégie	2007–2008	Pharmaceutical representative
Sébastien Schneeberger	Drummond	Centre-du-Québec	2007–2008	Factory worker
Gilles Taillon	Chauveau	Québec	2007–2008	President of the Conseil du patronat du Québec
Jean-François Therrien	Terrebonne	Lanaudière	2007–2008	Researcher

== Defeated ADQ star candidates ==
Candidate	District	Region	Year	Background
Diane Bellemare	Blainville; Pointe-aux-Trembles; Bertrand	Laurentides; Montreal East; Laurentides	2003 by-election, 2007; 2008	Senior Vice-President and Chief Economist of the Conseil du patronat du Québec
Pierre Bourque	Bourget	Montreal	2003	Mayor of Montreal
Pierre Brien	Rouyn-Noranda–Témiscamingue; Vimont	Abitibi; Laval	2003; 2008	Bloc Québécois Member of Parliament
Mario Charpentier	Brome-Missisquoi	Eastern Townships	2008	Lawyer
Guy Laforest	Louis-Hébert	Québec	2003	Teacher
Joëlle Lescop	Vachon	Montérégie	2003	Pediatrician
Hubert Meilleur	Argenteuil; Mirabel	Laurentides	1994; 2003	Mayor of Mirabel
Denis Mondor	Bourget	Montreal	by-election, 2007	Former President of the Quebec Bar

== Prominent members ==
Member	Region	Years	Background
Léon Courville	Montreal	2002–2003	Executive of National Bank of Canada
Yvon Cyrenne	Montreal	2003–2006	Economist
Marcel Dutil	Chaudière-Appalaches	2002–2003	Business leader
Yvon Picotte	Mauricie	2002–2008	Liberal MNA and cabinet minister

== Election results ==
General election	# of candidates	# of seats before election	# of seats won	% of popular vote
1994	80	1*	1 / 125	6.46%
1998	125	1	1 / 125	11.81%
2003	125	5	4 / 125	18.18%
2007	125	5	41 / 125	30.80%
2008	125	39	7 / 125	16.38%

- - The ADQ did not exist during the 1989 election, but Liberal backbencher Yvon Lafrance joined the party on March 2, 1994, six months before the 1994 election, becoming their first member to sit in the National Assembly.

== General conventions ==
General conventions (French: congrès généraux) were open to all card-carrying supporters.

#	Date	Location	Turnout
1st	March 1994	Laval	n/a
2nd	October 1996	Saint-Jean-sur-Richelieu	n/a
3rd	April 2000	Saint-Hyacinthe	n/a
4th	October 2002	Drummondville	n/a
5th	September 2004	Drummondville	n/a
6th	November 2006	Trois-Rivières	300
7th	March 2008	Laval	1,000

== Sources ==
- Julien Béliveau, Mario Dumont — Le pouvoir de l'image

== See also ==
- Politics of Quebec
- List of Quebec general elections
- List of Quebec premiers
- List of Quebec leaders of the Opposition
- National Assembly of Quebec
- Timeline of Quebec history
- Political parties in Quebec
- Jean-François Plante
