= Nathalie Elgrably-Lévy =

Canadian economist

Nathalie Elgrably-Lévy is a Canadian economics teacher and writer. She holds an M.Sc. in Commerce from HEC Montréal, with a specialization in applied Economics and a thesis on the federal budget deficit. Elgrably-Lévy is primarily interested by the evaluation of public policy.

== Career ==
Elgrably-Lévy is a full-time lecturer at HEC Montréal since 1992. She also taught economics for several years at the University of Montreal and at UQAM. She is a Senior Economist at the Montreal Economic Institute. She is the author of La face cachée des politiques publiques, published in 2006 by Les Éditions Logiques. Elgrably-Lévy produced a Quebec adaptation of the 6th edition of Microeconomics by Pyndick and Rubinfeld. She is also a columnist for Le Journal de Montréal and Le Journal de Québec. In 2008, she worked as a Senior Economist at the Fraser Institute. One of Elgrably-Levy paper on the minimum wage was criticized by Sylvain Sauvé over ideological neutrality.

== Positions and controversies ==
In her chronicles, Nathalie Elgrably-Lévy questions global warming and defends the climate skeptics which, according to her, of the ambient dogmatism: "Environmentalism has become the religion of 21st Century! As it is impossible to make scientific predictions, you must have faith and never question dogmas.”

Regarding the distribution of income, Nathalie Elgrably-Lévy accused Statistics Canada of publishing "tendentious information" which, according to her, underestimates the income of poor Canadian families, in order to justify redistribution policies. The deputy chief statistician of Canada, Richard Barnabé, replied that she was wrong: the study she had criticized reports on all the sources of income of the families.

She condemns subsidies to artists and cultural enterprises, saying: "There are only two reasons why an artist lives in poverty. The first is that his talent may not be in demand. The second is that he may simply be devoid of talent. In either case, the public is not willing to spend its money on the purchase of the cultural product offered. So, why put taxpayers' money into it?"

She also denounces the political orientations of the unions, incentive campaigns to encourage voters to vote She denounces student associations that reject tuition fees, the principle of pay-as-you-go retirement, and the labor code.
