= Pierre Lemieux (economist) =

Canadian economist

- Born: Sherbrooke, Quebec
- Education: University of Toronto (MA); Université de Sherbrooke (MA)
- Occupations: Economist, Author

Pierre Lemieux is a Canadian and French economist whose writings straddle economic and political theory, public choice, public finance, and public policy. He lives in Maine.

== Early life and education ==
Lemieux was born in Sherbrooke, Quebec in 1947. He earned a Master of Arts in economics from the University of Toronto and another in Philosophy from the Université de Sherbrooke.

== Career ==
Lemieux is a professor in the Department of Management Sciences at the University of Québec in Outaouais. He is also currently a senior fellow at the Montreal Economic Institute. During the winter of 2009, he was a visiting scholar in the Department of Economics at San Jose State University. Lemieux is also a senior affiliated scholar at the Mercatus Center, a non-profit think tank associated with George Mason University.

He has been a columnist for the Western Standard and has published pieces in several financial newspapers, including The Wall Street Journal, The National Post, the Le Figaro Économie, and La Tribune.

Lemieux is the founder of the Iconoclastes book series published by Les Belles Lettres.

He has also been an occasional consultant for a few national and international corporations. He is a frequent contributor to Regulation, Econlib.org, The Hill, and The Maine Wire.

== Scholarship ==
His first books, published in Paris in the 1980s, were on the economics and political philosophy of anarcho-capitalism and classical liberalism: Du libéralisme à l'anarcho capitalisme (From Liberalism to Anarcho-Capitalism), La souveraineté de l'individu (The Sovereignty of the Individual), and L'anarcho-capitalisme (Anarcho-Capitalism).

He went on in the early 1990s to publish Apologie des sorcières modernes (Apology of Modern Witches), in defense of insider trading, and Le droit de porter des armes (The Right to Keep and Bear Arms), in defense of this right. In late 1990, he published, in Montréal, a little book, in both an English and French version, in favor of the liberty to smoke tobacco: Smoking and Liberty: Government as a Public Health Problem.

His 2008 book Comprendre l'économie. Ou comment les économistes pensent (Understanding Economics: Or How Economists Think), published by the Belles Lettres foundation in Paris, is an introduction to economics for the layman. The book was awarded a Turgot Prize by the Institut Turgot.

In another book published by Les Belles Lettres (Paris) in 2009, Une crise peut en cacher une autre, Lemieux argued that the 2008 financial crisis was a consequence of mounting state intervention.

In 2013, he published The Public Debt Problem: A Comprehensive Guide.

== Published books ==
- Du libéralisme à l'anarcho-capitalisme (Paris: Presses Universitaires de France, 1983). Japanese translation: Tokyo, Shunju Sha, 1990.
- La souveraineté de l'individu (Paris: Presses Universitaires de France, 1987). Spanish translation: Madrid, Union Editorial, 1992.
- L'anarcho-capitalisme (Paris: Presses Universitaires de France [collection "Que sais-je?"], 1988). Turkish translation: Istanbul, Iletisim Yayincilik AS, 1994.
- Apologie des sorcières modernes (Paris: Belles Lettres, 1991).
- Le droit de porter des armes (Paris: Belles Lettres, 1993).
- Smoking and Liberty: Government as a Public Health Problem (Montréal: Varia Press, 1997). French version: *Tabac et liberté. L'État comme problème de santé publique (Montréal: Varia, 1997).
- Confessions d'un coureur des bois hors-la-loi (Montréal: Varia, 2001).
- Comprendre l'économie. Ou comment les économistes pensent (Paris: Belles Lettres, 2008).
- Une crise peut en cacher une autre (Paris: Belles Lettres, 2010).
- Somebody in Charge: A Solution to Recessions? (New York: Palgrave Macmillan, 2011).
- The Public Debt Problem: A Comprehensive Guide (New York: Palgrave Macmillan, 2013).
- Who Needs Jobs? Spreading Poverty or Increasing Welfare (New York: Palgrave Macmillan, 2014).
- What's Wrong with Protectionism? Answering Common Objections to Free Trade (Lanham: Rowman & Littlefield, 2018).

=== Other publications ===
Pierre Lemieux has published a number of academic articles and several op-eds. His academic articles include:

- "From Lemonade Stands to 2065", The Independent Review 20-3 (Winter 2016), pp. 335–342.
- "The State and Public Choice", The Independent Review 20-1 (Summer 2015), pp. 23–31.
- "Public Health Insurance under a Nonbenevolent State", Journal of Medicine and Philosophy 33-5 (2008), pp. 416–426.
- The Underground Economy (Montréal: Montréal Economic Institute, 2007).
- "Social Welfare, State Intervention, and Value Judgments", The Independent Review 11-1 (Summer 2006), pp. 19–36.
- "The Public Choice Revolution", Regulation 27-3 (Fall 2004), pp. 22–29.
- "Following the Herd", Regulation 26-4 (Winter 2003–04), pp. 16–21.
- "Les droits de propriété", with Ejan Mackaay, Dictionnaire des Sciences Économiques (Paris: Presses Universitaires de France, 2001).
- "The World Bank’s Tobacco Economics ", Regulation 24-3 (Fall 1981), pp. 16–19.
- "L'avenir du tabac", Futuribles 261 (February 2001).
- "Heil Health," The Independent Review 4-2 (Fall 1999).
- "Chaos et Anarchie," in Alain Albert (Ed.), Chaos and Society (Amsterdam: IOS Press, 1995).

He was also co-translator of two books:

- James M. Buchanan, Les limites de la liberté (The Limits of Liberty) (Paris : Litec, 1993).
- Murray N. Rothbard, L'éthique de la liberté (The Ethics of Liberty) (Paris : Belles Lettres, 1991).
