= Organisations unies pour l'indépendance =

Canadian non-governmental organization

Organisations unies pour l'indépendance (OUI) is a non-governmental organization promoting Quebec sovereignty in the Canadian province of Quebec. The council was started in 2003 at the initiative of the province's Parti Québécois government. Before December 2014, it was known as the Conseil de la souveraineté du Québec (CSQ)

An earlier organization of the same name existed in 1995 and played a prominent role in the 1995 Quebec referendum on sovereignty.

== 1995 organization ==
The original council was established in May 1995, with former Parti Québécois cabinet minister Yves Duhaime as its first president and prominent Quebec nationalist Louise Laurin was its first vice-president. While it had only a small membership, it was regarded a serious force in influencing public opinion. During the buildup to the referendum, it ran full-page advertisements in English-language newspapers arguing that the government of Canada was wasting millions in taxpayer dollars by promoting Canadian federalism in Quebec.

Quebec's Parti Québécois government authorized payments to the council amounting to four million dollars in August and October 1995; this money was not subject to campaign finance limits, as it was all spent before the referendum campaign officially started. Duhaime argued that the money was well spent in countering Canadian federalist advertising. The council also raised and spent a further one million dollars in the same period.

== 2003 organization ==
The new council was launched in early 2003, at the urging of former Quebec premier Jacques Parizeau. It was designated with charitable tax status and was assured of regular financial support from both the Parti Québécois and Bloc Québécois; both parties also nominated one member to its eleven-member governing board. The new council's first leader was Gerald Larose, who continues to hold this position as of 2011. The council has urged the Parti Québécois to maintain an openly sovereigntist ideology.

In 2006, the council introduced a book, Parlons de souveraineté à l'école ("Let's talk about sovereignty at school") intended to be taught in classrooms for children of kindergarten age upwards. Premier Jean Charest dismissed the book as "exploit[ing] children for political ends," while Parti Québécois leader André Boisclair agreed that the book was not appropriate.

As of 2011, the council's governing board includes representatives of the Parti Québécois, the Bloc Québécois, and Québec solidaire.

== 2014 organisation ==
In December 2014, CSQ renamed to OUI (Organisations unies pour l'indépendance), a.k.a. OUI Québec, and adopted a major revision of their mission.

In 2026, OUI held extensive consultations starting in January with 50 civil society organizations, chambers of commerce, unions about the state of sovereignty in Quebec. It found out that 77% of respondents called for a comprehensive societal project, 71% felt a very strong sense of powerlessness, and 64% believed that Quebec had regressed on the issue of living together with immigrants. Former ministers and Parti Québécois MNAs: Louise Harel, Louise Beaudoin, and Monique Simard shared the observations with Harel and Beaudoin also advocated for the PQ leader Paul St Pierre Plamondon to accept the results.
