= La Peltrie =

Provincial electoral district in Quebec, Canada

Quebec electoral district

Provincial electoral district
- Legislature: National Assembly of Quebec
MNA
Maïté Blanchette Vézina
Conservative
- District created: 1980
- First contested: 1981
- Last contested: 2026

Demographics
- Population (2006): 69,837
- Electors (2012): 53,726
- Area (km²): 774.1
- Pop. density (per km²): 90.2
- Census division(s): Quebec City (part), La Jacques-Cartier (part)
- Census subdivision(s): Quebec City (part), L'Ancienne-Lorette, Saint-Gabriel-de-Valcartier, Shannon

La Peltrie (French pronunciation: [la pɛltʁi]) is a provincial electoral district in the Capitale-Nationale region of Quebec, Canada, that elects members to the National Assembly of Quebec. It notably includes parts of Quebec City as well as the city of L'Ancienne-Lorette.

It was created for the 1981 election from a part of Chauveau electoral district.

In the change from the 2001 to the 2011 electoral map, it lost Saint-Augustin-de-Desmaures to Louis-Hébert and parts of Quebec City to Louis-Hébert and Chauveau, but gained some cities and municipalities from Chauveau and Portneuf.

In 2026, it gained the remainder of the Des Châtels neighbourhood and the Place-Duclos neighbourhood from Vanier-Les Rivières, while losing Sainte-Catherine-de-la-Jacques-Cartier, Fossambault-sur-le-Lac and Lac-Saint-Joseph.

== Members of the National Assembly ==
Legislature	Years	Member	Party
Riding created from Chauveau
32nd	1981–1985	Pauline Marois	Parti Québécois
33rd	1985–1989	Lawrence Cannon	Liberal
34th	1989–1994	Lawrence Cannon	Liberal
35th	1994–1998	Michel Côté	Parti Québécois
36th	1998–2003	Michel Côté	Parti Québécois
37th	2003–2007	France Hamel	Liberal
38th	2007–2008	Éric Caire	Action démocratique
39th	2008–2009	Éric Caire	Action démocratique
39th	2009–2011	Éric Caire	Independent
39th	2011–2012	Éric Caire	Coalition Avenir Québec
40th	2012–2014	Éric Caire	Coalition Avenir Québec
41st	2014–2018	Éric Caire	Coalition Avenir Québec
42nd	2018–2022	Éric Caire	Coalition Avenir Québec
43rd	2022–2026	Éric Caire	Coalition Avenir Québec
44th	2026–Present	Maïté Blanchette Vézina	Conservative

== Election results ==
2026 Quebec general election
** Preliminary results — Not yet official **
Party	Candidate	Votes	%	±%
Conservative	Maïté Blanchette Vézina	21,826	48.17	+19.63
Parti Québécois	Julie Vignola	8,541	18.85	+8.54
Liberal	Alain Chandonnet	7,112	15.70	+9.76
Coalition Avenir Québec	Véronique Laprise	4,157	9.17	–35.31
Québec solidaire	Frédéric Aubé	3,220	7.11	–2.36
Parti nul	Emilie Roberge-Boily	302	0.67	+0.33
Climat Québec	Martin Grand'Maison	153	0.34	+0.18
Total valid votes		45,311	98.88	–0.17
Total rejected ballots		512	1.12	+0.17
Turnout		45,823	76.61	+2.91
Electors on the lists		59,815		
Conservative notional gain from Coalition Avenir Québec		Swing		+5.55
Source: Élections Québec

2022 Quebec general election redistributed results
Party	Vote	%
Coalition Avenir Québec	18,329	44.48
Conservative	11,759	28.54
Parti Québécois	4,247	10.31
Québec solidaire	3,902	9.47
Liberal	2,448	5.94
Others	522	1.27

2022 Quebec general election
Party	Candidate	Votes	%	±%
Coalition Avenir Québec	Éric Caire	19,714	44.35	-13.38
Conservative	Stéphane Lachance	13,291	29.90	+25.15
Parti Québécois	Martin Trudel	4,415	9.93	+2.40
Québec solidaire	Lucie Villeneuve	3,954	8.90	-0.97
Liberal	Frédéric Doumalin	2,517	5.66	-10.95
Green	Sandra Mara Riedo	289	0.65	-1.08
Parti nul	Olivier Grondin	151	0.34	-0.41
Climat Québec	Alain Fortin	71	0.16	–
Démocratie directe	Martin Grand'Maison	46	0.10	–
Total valid votes		44,448	98.71	–
Total rejected ballots		579	1.29	–
Turnout		45,027	73.70	
Electors on the lists		61,092		

2018 Quebec general election
Party	Candidate	Votes	%	±%
Coalition Avenir Québec	Éric Caire	23,389	57.73	+7.4
Liberal	Stéphane Lacasse	6,729	16.61	-17.19
Québec solidaire	Alexandre Jobin-Lawler	4,000	9.87	+6.47
Parti Québécois	Doni Berberi	3,050	7.53	-2.54
Conservative	Julie Plamondon	1,926	4.75	+3.43
Green	Sandra Mara Riedo	700	1.73	
Parti nul	Kevin Bouchard	305	0.75	
Citoyens au pouvoir	Yohann Dauphinais	266	0.66	
Équipe Autonomiste	Josée Mélanie Michaud	85	0.21	-0.23
Parti 51	Stephen Wright	67	0.17	
Total valid votes		40,517	98.16	
Total rejected ballots		760	1.84	
Turnout		41,277	70.77	
Eligible voters		58,329		
Coalition Avenir Québec hold		Swing		+12.295
Source(s) "Rapport des résultats officiels du scrutin". Élections Québec.

2014 Quebec general election
Party	Candidate	Votes	%
Coalition Avenir Québec	Éric Caire	21,386	50.33
Liberal	France Gagnon	14,362	33.80
Parti Québécois	Paule Desgagnés	4,281	10.07
Québec solidaire	Alexandre Jobin-Lawler	1,444	3.40
Conservative	Thomas Pouliot	561	1.32
Option nationale	Éric Belleau	274	0.64
Équipe Autonomiste	Camille Dion-Garneau	185	0.44
Total valid votes		42,493	98.90
Total rejected ballots		473	1.10
Turnout		42,966	77.00
Electors on the lists		55,695	–

2012 Quebec general election
Party	Candidate	Votes	%	±%
Coalition Avenir Québec	Éric Caire	21,871	51.88	+10.99
Liberal	Jean-François Gosselin	11,747	27.86	-9.69
Parti Québécois	Jean-Luc Jolivet	6,069	14.40	-4.50
Québec solidaire	Brigitte Hannequin	1,069	2.54	-0.13
Option nationale	Alexandre Desmeules	690	1.64	
Independent	Anthony Leclerc	552	1.31	
Équipe Autonomiste	Charlotte Cyr	162	0.38	
Total valid votes		42,160	98.84	–
Total rejected ballots		495	1.16	–
Turnout		42,655	79.03	
Electors on the lists		53,974	–	–
Coalition Avenir Québec hold		Swing		+10.34

^ Change is from redistributed results. CAQ change is from ADQ.

2008 Quebec general election
Party	Candidate	Votes	%	±%
Action démocratique	Éric Caire	13,461	39.17	-11.89
Liberal	France Hamel	13,025	37.91	+10.82
Parti Québécois	France Gagné	6,988	20.34	+3.28
Québec solidaire	Guillaume Boivin	888	2.58	+0.71

2007 Quebec general election
Party	Candidate	Votes	%
Action démocratique	Éric Caire	21,055	50.33
Liberal	France Hamel	11,171	27.09
Parti Québécois	Robert Beauregard	7,033	17.06
Green	Priscilla Schafer	1,203	2.92
Québec solidaire	Guillaume Boivin	772	1.87
Total valid votes		41,234	99.24
Total rejected ballots		316	0.76
Turnout		41,550	79.76
Electors on the lists		52,097	–

2003 Quebec general election
Party	Candidate	Votes	%
Liberal	France Hamel	16,462	41.47
Action démocratique	Éric Caire	13,421	33.81
Parti Québécois	Claude Gendreau	8,711	21.94
Independent	Deny Hamel	586	1.48
UFP	Guillaume Boivin	515	1.30
Total valid votes		39,695	99.10
Total rejected ballots		359	0.90
Turnout		40,054	79.01
Electors on the lists		50,692	–

1998 Quebec general election
Party	Candidate	Votes	%
Parti Québécois	Michel Côté	20,996	46.44
Liberal	Pierre-Roland Mercier	16,134	41.47
Action démocratique	Jean-François Paquet	7,382	16.33
Socialist Democracy	Guillaume Boivin	492	1.09
Natural Law	Bruno Paquet	206	0.46
Total valid votes		45,210	99.01
Total rejected ballots		451	0.99
Turnout		45,661	84.37
Electors on the lists		54,119	–

1995 Quebec referendum
Side	Votes	%
Oui	26,426	54.75
Non	21,844	45.25

1994 Quebec general election
Party	Candidate	Votes	%
Parti Québécois	Michel Côté	20,475	49.27
Liberal	Raymond Bernier	11,906	28.65
Action démocratique	Richard Domm	6,003	14.44
Independent	Denis Noreau	1,418	3.41
Independent	Marcel Paquin	742	1.79
Independent	Mario Valoy	541	1.30
Natural Law	Anne Royer	475	1.14
Total valid votes		41,560	97.98
Total rejected ballots		857	2.02
Turnout		42,417	85.51
Electors on the lists		49,607	–

1992 Charlottetown Accord referendum
Side	Votes	%
Non	32,598	67.69
Oui	15,563	32.31

1989 Quebec general election
Party	Candidate	Votes	%
Liberal	Lawrence Cannon	20,528	52.17
Parti Québécois	Monique Cloutier	16,250	41.30
New Democratic	Claude Pelletier	2,567	6.52
Total valid votes		39,345	97.15
Total rejected ballots		1,155	2.85
Turnout		40,500	80.16
Electors on the lists		50,526	–

1985 Quebec general election
Party	Candidate	Votes	%
Liberal	Lawrence Cannon	19,819	55.93
Parti Québécois	Pauline Marois	13,462	37.99
New Democratic	Denis Jeffrey	1,968	5.55
Christian Socialism	Gilles Bertrand	189	0.53
Total valid votes		35,438	98.55
Total rejected ballots		520	1.45
Turnout		35,958	82.83
Electors on the lists		43,410	–

1981 Quebec general election
Party	Candidate	Votes	%
Parti Québécois	Pauline Marois	17,975	57.31
Liberal	Jean-Guy Carignan	12,638	40.30
Union Nationale	Laval Tardif	749	2.39
Total valid votes		31,362	98.95
Total rejected ballots		333	1.05
Turnout		31,695	86.78
Electors on the lists		36,522	–

== See also ==
- List of Quebec provincial electoral districts
- Canadian provincial electoral districts
