= Conseil du patronat du Québec =

The Conseil du patronat du Québec or CPQ (English: Quebec Council of Employers) is an institution that promotes business interests in Quebec, Canada.

It was established on January 20, 1969 and plays a significant role in the politics of Quebec by issuing opinions on the impact of the governments' decisions on the economy of Quebec.

Its positions often favour a corporate-friendly governance, fiscal conservatism, and constitutional stability or status quo; for example, it supported Bill 78.

Michelle LLambias Meunier is its current president.

Denis Deschamps is now the President of the Board of Administration.

== Presidents of the CPQ ==
Rank	Name	From	To
1	Charles Perrault	January 1969	May 1976
2	Pierre Des Marais, II	May 1976	May 1978
3	Pierre Côté	May 1978	May 1982
4	Sébastien Allard	May 1982	June 1986
5	Ghislain Dufour	June 1986	February 1997
6	Denis Beauregard	February 1997	June 1998
7	Gilles Taillon	June 1998	January 2006
8	Michel Kelly-Gagnon	April 2006	March 2009
9	Yves-Thomas Dorval	March 2009	June 2020
10	Karl Blackburn	June 2020	April 2025
11	Michelle LLambias Meunier	October 2025	current

== Presidents of the Board of Administration of the CPQ ==
- Marcel Bundock (1986 - 1988)
- Jeannine Guillevin Wood (1988 - 1990)
- Guy Laflamme (1990 - 1994)
- Jim Hewitt (1994 - 1996)
- Ghislain Dufour (1996 - 1997)
- André Y. Fortier (1998 - 2002)
- Guy G. Dufresne (2002 - 2006)
- John LeBoutillier (2006 - 2010)
- Jean-Yves Leblanc (2010 - 2014)
- Louis-Marie Beaulieu (2014 - 2017)
- Marc-André Roy (2017 - 2020)
- Yves-Thomas Dorval (2020-2022)
- Émilie Dussault (2022-2024)
- Denis Deschamps (2024-2026)
