= Michel Côté (MNA) =

Canadian politician (1937–2023)

Michel Côté (12 August 1937 – 9 March 2023) was a member of the National Assembly of Quebec for the Parti Québécois in La Peltrie from 1994 to 2003.

First elected in the 1994 election, he was re-elected in 1998. He did not run for re-election in 2003.

Michel died in Quebec City on 9 March 2023, at the age of 85.
