= Éric Caire =

Canadian politician (born 1965)

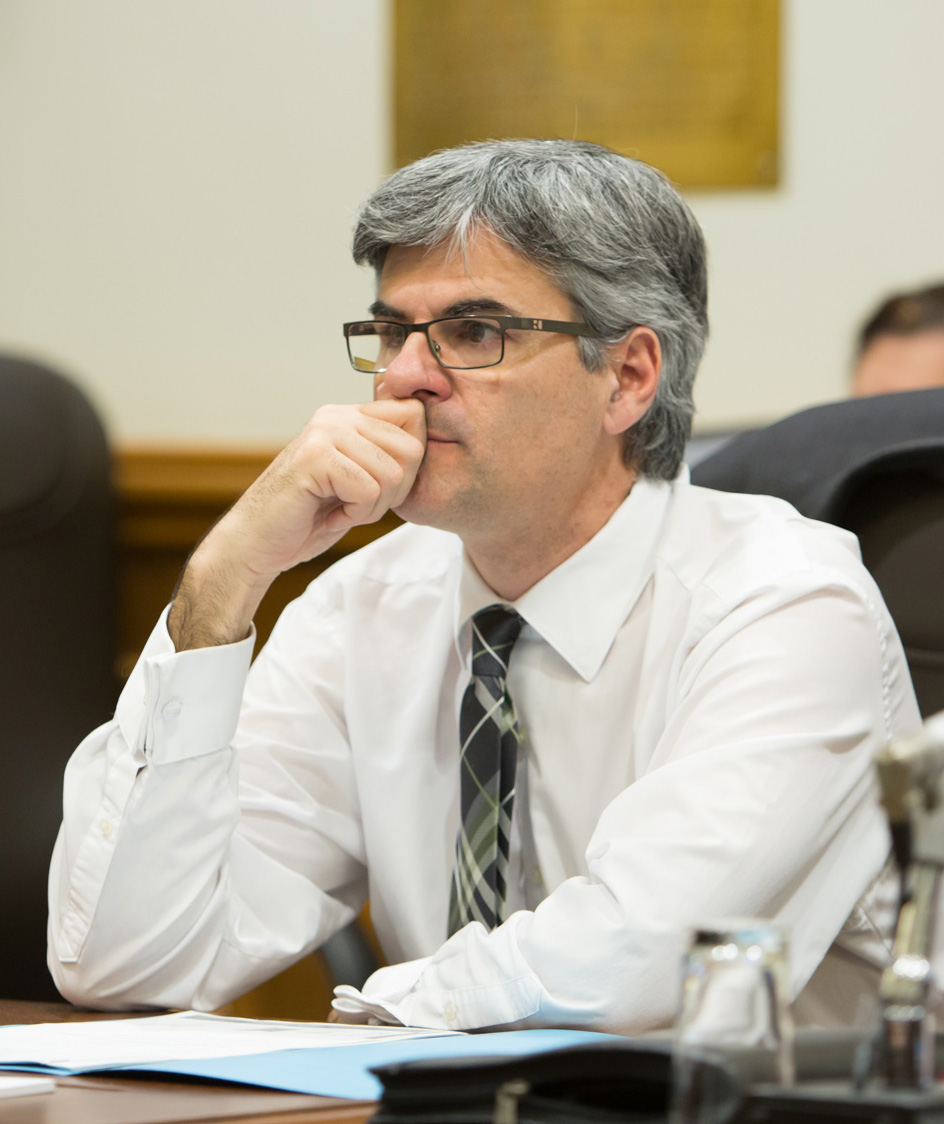
- Caire in 2015

Minister of Cybersecurity and Digital Affairs
- In office January 1, 2022 – February 27, 2025
- Premier: François Legault
- Preceded by: Position established
- Succeeded by: Gilles Bélanger

Member of the National Assembly of Quebec for La Peltrie
- In office March 26, 2007 – August 27, 2026
- Preceded by: France Hamel
- Succeeded by: Maïté Blanchette Vézina

Personal details
- Born: May 21, 1965 (age 61) Sorel-Tracy, Quebec, Canada
- Party: CAQ (since 2011)
- Other political affiliations: Independent (2009–2011); ADQ (2007–2009)
- Spouse: Marie-Ève Lemay

Éric Caire (French pronunciation: [eʁik kɛʁ]; born May 21, 1965) is a Canadian politician who served as a member of the National Assembly for the electoral district of La Peltrie from 2007 to 2026.

== Early career ==
Caire was born in Sorel-Tracy, Quebec. He was the owner of a local business for one year and taught computer science at Collège François-Xavier-Garneau in Quebec City. Before his election, he was a computer-analyst for eight years including two with Cognicase. In 2004, he was also the host of a local community radio show at CIMI-FM.

== Political career ==
Caire first attempted to enter politics in 2001 with a failed independent candidacy at the Quebec municipal elections in 2001. Caire first ran for a provincial seat at the National Assembly for the Action démocratique du Québec (ADQ) in the 2003 election but finished second with 34% of the vote. Liberal candidate France Hamel won with 41% of the vote.

In the 2007 election, Caire was easily elected with 51% of the vote. Hamel, who was running for re-election, finished second with 27% of the vote. Caire took office on April 12, 2007. On April 19, 2007, he was selected to be the Official Opposition's Shadow Minister of Health.

Caire was among the first ADQ supporters to back the abolition of public school boards, an idea inspired by the OECD reforms on school choice (notably charter schools and school vouchers education models) as they exist notably in England, Sweden, Netherlands, Australia and some Canadian provinces (notably Alberta), that is now part of the party's platform as of 2007.

In the 2008 election, Caire won re-election with 39% of the vote, even though his party's support sharply declined.

He was a candidate for the 2009 Action démocratique du Québec leadership election and lost by two votes to Gilles Taillon. He subsequently left the party, alleging that the party organization lacked transparency and that Taillon had a dictatorial style of leadership.

On December 19, 2011, he joined the CAQ. He was re-elected in the 2012, 2014, 2018, and 2022 provincial elections. In 2022, he was appointed to the Legault ministry as a Cabinet minister for Cybersecurity and Digital Affairs. Caire was first appointed as Deputy Minister for Government Digital Transformation in 2018. He was minister during Société de l'assurance automobile du Québec's digitalization efforts, which received criticism for being over budget; he eventually resigned from the post in February 2025. In 2026, Caire announced that he would not seek re-election in that year's provincial election.
