= Michel Kelly-Gagnon =

Canadian lawyer and businessman (born 1971)

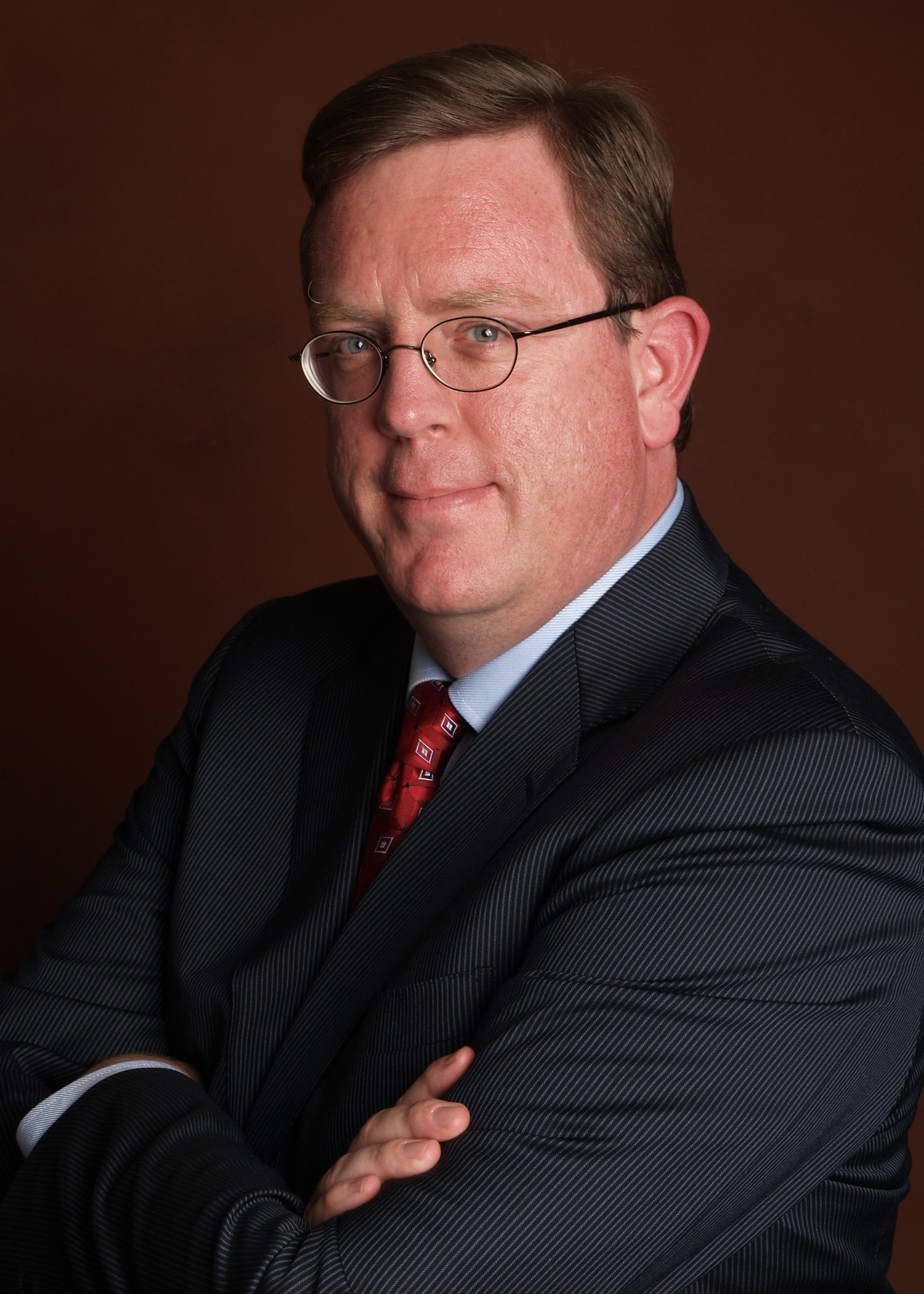

Michel Kelly-Gagnon is a Canadian lawyer and businessman born in 1971. He graduated in law from the Université de Montréal and was admitted to the Quebec Bar in 1994. He is currently the president and CEO of the Montreal Economic Institute.

== Career ==
After practicing law with Colas & Associates, Kelly-Gagnon went into business as an associate of Formatrad, an in-house employee training firm. In 1998, he assumed leadership of the Montreal Economic Institute (MEI). The annual budget was $15,000 in 1998 and rose to $1 400 393 by 2005. To achieve this growth, he explained that he raised funds from corporations and wealthy individuals in Canada and the US by offering to represent their interests.

In 2006, he became the president of the Quebec Employers Council where he changed an operational deficit of $110,196 the year before his arrival, into a $205,804 surplus after his first year. In 2009, he returned to the MEI as president and moved the organisation from a $269,342 deficit for financial year ending December 31, 2008 to a $153,188 surplus (as of December 31, 2009) in the context of a severe recession. From 2006 to 2009, he also served on the board of directors of Quebec Workers Compensation Board (CSST). He is also member of the Mont Pelerin Society, president of the advisory committee of Global Ressources Humaines, and he is in the board of directors of the Fondation universitaire Pierre Arbour, the John W. Dobson Foundation, and the Canadian Youth Business Foundation (CYBF).

Kelly-Gagnon was a 2008 honoree for the Canada's Top 40 Under 40 awards, a project from Caldwell Partners, an executive search firm.

== Published books ==
- Chroniques économiques : Des idées pour démystifier les politiques publiques (Montreal: Varia, 2004).

=== Other ===
- Un budget assorti à la réalité politique, Montreal Economic Institute (April 2010).
- Un dialogue crucial – Le Québec aurait tort de maintenir une attitude négative envers l’Alberta, Montreal Economic Institute (January 2010).
- Trust the owners - Companies need flexibility in choosing how much to pay their executives, Montreal Economic Institute (January 2010).
- Business elite deserves big bucks: Executive pay should concern only shareholders – nobody else, Montreal Economic Institute (January 2010)
- Le Point sur l'explosion des dépenses du gouvernement fédéral américain, Montreal Economic Institute (March 2009).
