= Jean Perrault =

Canadian politician

Mayor of Sherbrooke
- In office 1994 – November 12, 2009
- Preceded by: Paul Gervais
- Succeeded by: Bernard Sévigny

Personal details
- Born: May 28, 1945 (age 81)

Jean Perrault (born May 28, 1945) is a Canadian politician, who served as mayor of Sherbrooke, Quebec from 1994 to 2009, and as president of the Federation of Canadian Municipalities.

In his capacity as president of the FCM, he was one of the most outspoken Canadian opponents of the "Buy American" provisions in the American Recovery and Reinvestment Act of 2009.

He was first elected to the mayoralty of Sherbrooke in 1994. He announced in 2009 that he would not stand for re-election in the 2009 municipal election.
