= Le Petit Bras =

Le Petit Bras (French for the little arm) may refer to:

- Le Petit Bras (Le Gros Bras tributary), Capitale-Nationale, Quebec, Canada
- Le Petit Bras (Amédée River tributary), Côte-Nord, Quebec, Canada

== See also ==
- Le Gros Bras
