= Urbain Boiret =

Urbain Boiret (6 September 1731 – 5 November 1774) was a priest born in France who came to Canada and became a pivotal superior of the Séminaire de Québec.

Boiret came to Canada in 1755 with another priest, Henri-François Gravé de La Rive. His intention was to be part of the mission to the Tamaroa tribe in Illinois but his services were needed at the Séminaire de Québec. There he was to fill a number of offices, including that of bursar and professor of theology. He was appointed a director of the seminary in 1759. This also marked the beginning of the Siege of Quebec. Only Urbain and one other priest, Joseph-André-Mathurin Jacrau, remained at the seminary to manage the affairs of the seminary. However, almost everything was destroyed and Boiret, as bursar of the seminary, moved to Saint-Joachim to take stock of the situation and regroup.

Boiret returned to Québec in 1761, and by 1764 he had been elected superior of the Séminaire de Québec. It was during his tenure as superior that the reconstruction of the seminary took place. He served briefly as superior again before his death.

A 19th-century priest, Bishop Edmond Langevin discovered documentation regarding Boiret. The Holy See had conferred on him a Protonotary apostolic which he had not revealed to his fellow priests. The honour would have entitled him to be addressed as “Monseigneur”. Various place names are part of his legacy such as Saint-Urbain.
