= 2007 Charlevoix provincial by-election =

- September 24, 2007

Riding of Charlevoix
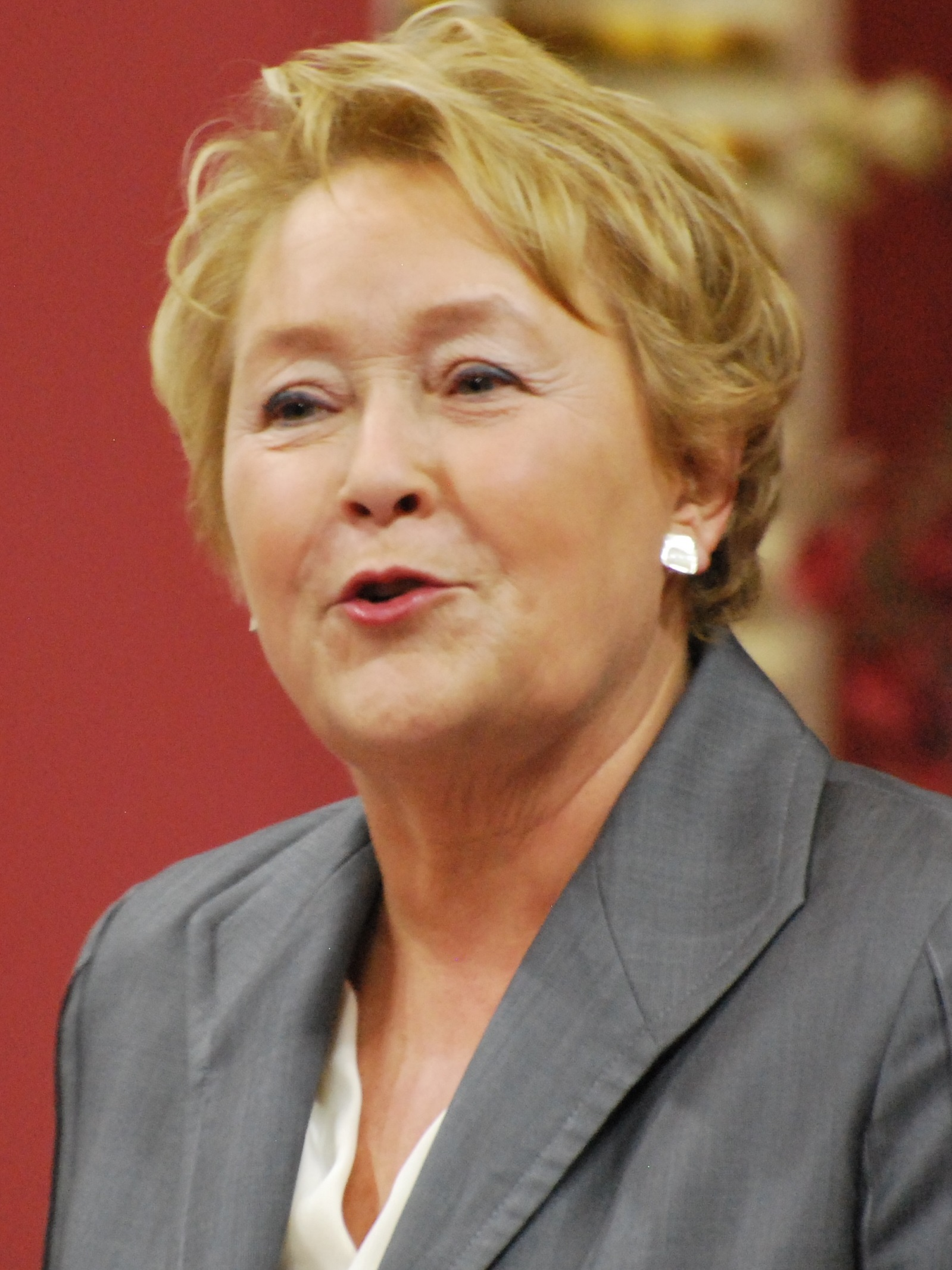
	First party	Second party
		ADQ
Candidate	Pauline Marois	Conrad Harvey
Party	Parti Québécois	Action démocratique
Popular vote	11,400	7,125
Percentage	59.20%	37.00%
Swing	▲21.53pp	▲6.22pp
MNA before election
Rosaire Bertrand
Parti Québécois
Elected MNA
Pauline Marois
Parti Québécois

A provincial by-election was held in Quebec on 24 September 2007 to fill the vacancy in the National Assembly riding of Charlevoix.

The by-election was caused by the decision of PQ MNA Rosaire Bertrand to stand down to offer the new Parti Québécois leader Pauline Marois a way to become an MNA. The Liberal Party of Quebec stated that it would not stand a candidate against Marois so that all three party leaders would be represented in the National Assembly, but the Action démocratique du Québec did run a candidate. The ADQ accused the Liberals and the PQ of a lack of democratic principles, claiming that it was not necessary for a third-party leader to be represented in the National Assembly.

== Results ==
Charlevoix by-election, September 24, 2007
Party	Candidate	Votes	%	±%
Parti Québécois	Pauline Marois	11 400	59.20	+21.53
Action démocratique	Conrad Harvey	7 125	37.00	+6.22
Green	David Turcotte	403	2.09	-0.20
Parti démocratie chrétienne	Paul Biron	135	0.70	+0.7
Independent	Claude Gagnon	77	0.40	+0.4
Independent (F4J)	Daniel Laforest	64	0.33	+0.33
Parti république	François Robert Lemire	52	0.27	+0.27
