= Remy River =

Location
- Country: Canada
- Province: Quebec
- Region: Capitale-Nationale
- Regional County Municipality: Charlevoix Regional County Municipality
- City: Baie-Saint-Paul

Physical characteristics
- Source: Remy Lake
  - location: Saint-Urbain
  - coordinates: 47.52346°N 70.62884°W
  - elevation: 401 m (1,316 ft)
- Mouth: Rivière du Gouffre
  - location: Saint-Urbain
  - coordinates: 47.49361°N 70.5125°W
  - elevation: 20 m (66 ft)
- Length: 13.6 km (8.5 mi)

Basin features
- Tributaries
  - left: (from the mouth) Little Rat stream, discharge from a small lake, discharge from a group of small lakes, discharge from two small lakes, Red stream, stream.
  - right: (from the mouth) Stream.

The Rémy River is a tributary of the west bank of the lower part of the rivière du Gouffre, flowing in the municipality of Saint-Urbain, in the Charlevoix Regional County Municipality, in the administrative region of Capitale-Nationale, in the province of Quebec, in Canada.

The lower part of this valley is mainly served by the route 381 (boulevard de Monseigneur-De Laval) which goes up the course of the Rivière du Gouffre by the west bank. The intermediate part is served by Chemin Saint-Thomas which runs on the south side of the river, as well as by Chemin du rang Saint-Jérôme which crosses the river. The upper part of this valley is served by a few secondary forest roads. Forestry is the main economic activity in this valley; recreational tourism, second.

The surface of the lower Rémy River is generally frozen from the beginning of December until the beginning of April; however, safe circulation on the ice is generally done from mid-December to the end of March. The water level of the river varies with the seasons and the precipitation; the spring flood generally occurs in April.

== Geography ==
The Rémy River rises at the mouth of Rémy Lake (length: 0.27 kilometres (0.17 mi); altitude: 401 metres (1,316 ft)) which is surrounded by mountains. This source of the river is located at:

- 4.4 kilometres (2.7 mi) south of the course of Le Petit Bras;
- 7.7 kilometres (4.8 mi) south-west of the village center of Saint-Urbain;
- 9.3 kilometres (5.8 mi) east of the mouth of the Rémy river (confluence with the Gouffre river);
- 13.0 kilometres (8.1 mi) north-west of Baie-Saint-Paul town center.

From its source, the course of the Rémy river descends on 13.6 kilometres (8.5 mi) in a generally deep valley, with a drop of 381 metres (1,250 ft), according to the following segments:

- 0.7 kilometres (0.43 mi) north, to a stream (coming from the south-west);
- 3.5 kilometres (2.2 mi) first towards the north on 0.4 kilometres (0.25 mi), then towards the east by forming a small loop towards the south-east, and collecting a stream (coming from the south), to a stream (coming from the west);
- 3.0 kilometres (1.9 mi) to the east, forming small streamers, then crossing a lake (length: 0.6 kilometres (0.37 mi); altitude: 328 metres (1,076 ft)) and collecting a stream (coming from the north), up to another stream (coming from the northwest);
- 3.0 kilometres (1.9 mi) towards the south-east in an increasingly steep valley down the mountain, to a stream (coming from the north-west);
- 2.5 kilometres (1.6 mi) to the south-east in an increasingly steep valley down the mountain, then north-east to route 138;
- 0.9 kilometres (0.56 mi) towards the east in the agricultural zone by forming two loops towards the south, until its mouth.

The Rémy River flows on the southwest bank of Le Gros Bras, in the municipality of Saint-Urbain. This mouth is located at:

- 0.5 kilometres (0.31 mi) east of route 138;
- 2.4 kilometres (1.5 mi) south-east of the summit of the Florent mountain;
- 7.3 kilometres (4.5 mi) south-east of the village center of Saint-Urbain;
- 5.9 kilometres (3.7 mi) north-west of Baie-Saint-Paul town center.

From the mouth of the Rémy river, the current descends on 11.5 kilometres (7.1 mi) with a drop of 16 metres (52 ft) following the course of the Rivière du Gouffre which flows into Baie-Saint-Paul in the St. Lawrence River.

== Toponymy ==
The oldest written mention of this hydronym dates from 1743, during an act of attribution of lot 218 by the Séminaire de Québec to Antoine and Michel Tremblay; this mention in the act proves an element of boundary. This toponymic designation also appears on a map drawn in 1751 by the royal surveyor of the time, Ignace Plamondon.

In La petite histoire de Charlevoix (1987), Léo Simard notes "La Rémie: double appellation and with a mill and a row, a few miles from Baie-Saint-Paul (route 138)". Despite several researches by historians, the origin of the toponym "Rémy river" remains uncertain. Some researchers, notably Nérée Tremblay, author of St-Pierre and St-Paul de la Baie St-Paul (p. 269), the name evokes the memory of Pierre Rémy (Paris, 1636 - Montreal, 1726), a Sulpician who arrived in New -France in 1672 and first priest to receive ordination in Montreal from the hands of Mgr Laval in 1676. This hypothesis seems the most probable according to the Commission de toponymie du Québec. For Father Jean-Paul Tremblay, author of La Baie-Saint-Paul and his pioneers (p. 11), land is known by familiar names including "La Rhémy, named after a former resident, Rémi Tremblay". Note that Father Tremblay mentions land and not a river.

The Rémy flour mill was built on two floors by the Séminaire de Québec during the years 1826 and 1827. Several generations of a Fortin family, millers from father to son, continue to operate this mill for more a century and a half.

Main variants of the official name: Rivière de la Rémi, Rivière la Rémi, Rivière Rémi, Ruisseau Rémi (name approved on April 3, 1959), Ruisseau Rémy and Ruisseau Renay.

The toponym “Rémy River” was formalized on August 29, 1972 at the Place Names Bank of the Commission de toponymie du Québec.

== Appendices ==
=== Related articles ===
- Charlevoix Regional County Municipality
- Saint-Urbain, a municipality
- Rivière du Gouffre
- St. Lawrence River
- List of rivers of Quebec
