= Adolphe Gagnon =

Canadian politician

Member of the Legislative Assembly of Quebec for Charlevoix
- In office 1871–1875
- Preceded by: Léon-Charles Clément
- Succeeded by: Onésime Gauthier

Personal details
- Born: May 20, 1810 Baie-Saint-Paul, Lower Canada
- Died: August 28, 1885 (aged 75) Baie-Saint-Paul, Quebec
- Party: Liberal

Adolphe Gagnon (May 20, 1810 – August 28, 1885) was a merchant and political figure in Quebec. He represented Charlevoix in the Legislative Assembly of the Province of Canada from 1861 to 1866 and in the Legislative Assembly of Quebec from 1871 to 1875 as a Liberal member.

He was born in Baie-Saint-Paul, Quebec, the son of Louis-Joseph Gagnon and Marguerite Durette, (a.k.a. Marguerite Durette dit Rochefort). Gagnon was a justice of the peace and a lieutenant in the militia for Charlevoix County. He served as mayor of the parish of Saint-Pierre-et-Saint-Paul from 1845 to 1857 and as county warden. Gagnon was married twice: to Ursule Garneau in 1833 and to Adelphine Huot in 1855. He was an unsuccessful candidate for a seat in the Legislative Council in 1856 and 1857. In 1867, he ran unsuccessfully for a seat in the Canadian House of Commons. Gagnon died in the parish of Saint-Pierre-et-Saint-Paul at the age of 75.

His daughter Justine married Henry Simard who later served in the House of Commons.
