= Pauline Marois =

Premier of Quebec from 2012 to 2014

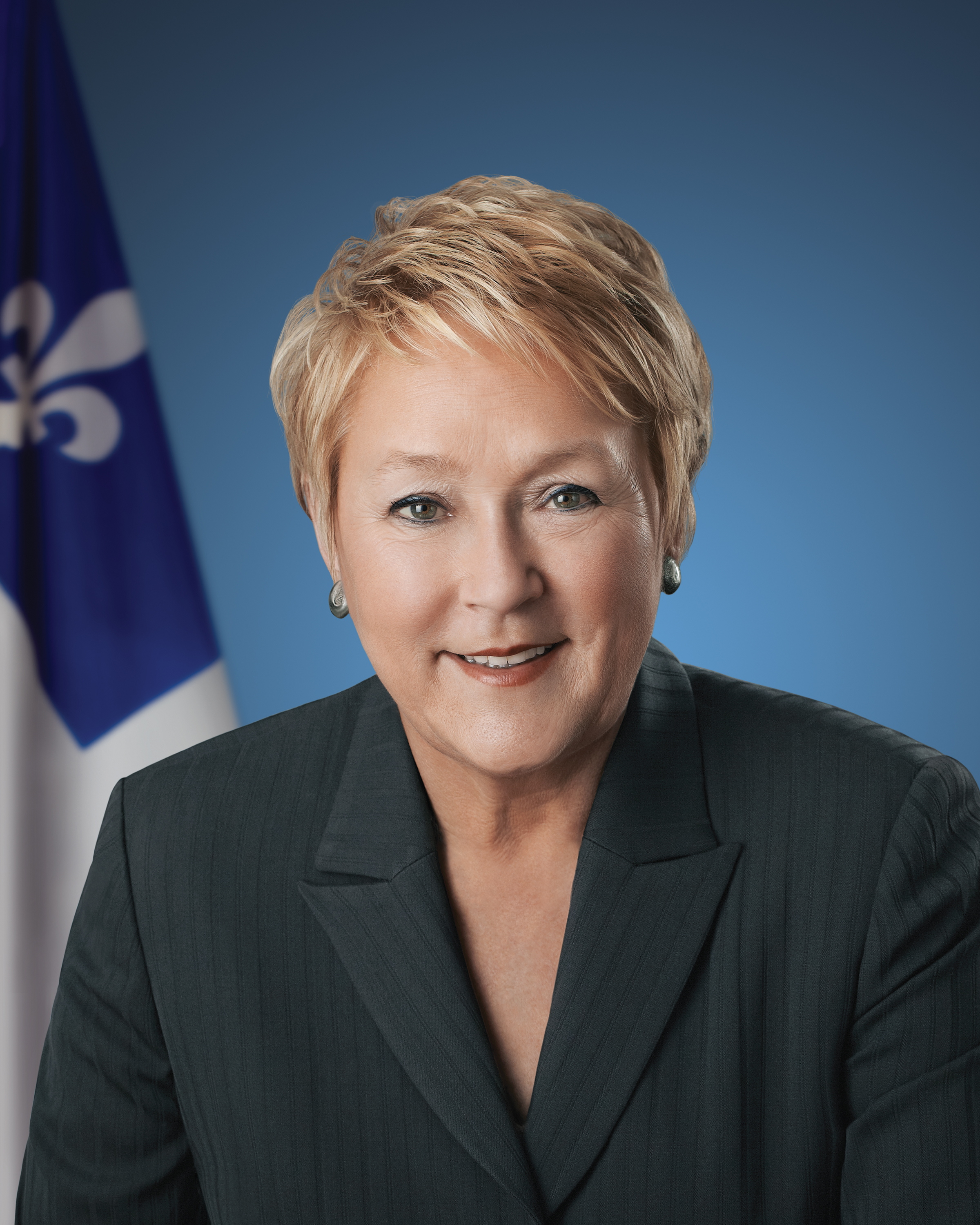
- Official portrait, 2013

30th Premier of Quebec
- In office September 19, 2012 – April 23, 2014
- Monarch: Elizabeth II
- Lieutenant Governor: Pierre Duchesne
- Deputy: François Gendron
- Preceded by: Jean Charest
- Succeeded by: Philippe Couillard

Leader of the Opposition of Quebec
- In office December 9, 2008 – September 19, 2012
- Preceded by: Mario Dumont
- Succeeded by: Jean-Marc Fournier

Leader of the Parti Québécois
- In office June 27, 2007 – June 7, 2014
- President: Monique Richard; Jonathan Valois; Raymond Archambault
- Preceded by: François Gendron (interim)
- Succeeded by: Stéphane Bédard (interim)

Deputy Premier of Quebec
- In office March 8, 2001 – April 29, 2003
- Premier: Bernard Landry
- Preceded by: Bernard Landry
- Succeeded by: Monique Gagnon-Tremblay
Quebec Executive Council
Minister of Finance (Note: Office known as "Minister of State for Economy and Finance" from 2001 to 2002 and "Minister of Finance, Economy and Research" from 2002 to 2003.)
In office March 8, 2001 – April 29, 2003
| Premier | Bernard Landry |
| Preceded by | Bernard Landry |
| Succeeded by | Yves Séguin |
In office November 3, 1995 – January 29, 1996
| Premier | Jacques Parizeau |
| Preceded by | Jean Campeau |
| Succeeded by | Bernard Landry (Economy and Finance) |
Minister of Health and Social Services
In office December 15, 1998 – March 8, 2001
| Premier | Lucien Bouchard |
| Preceded by | Jean Rochon |
| Succeeded by | Rémy Trudel |
Minister of Education
In office January 28, 1996 – December 15, 1998
| Premier | Lucien Bouchard |
| Preceded by | Jean Garon |
| Succeeded by | François Legault |
President of the Treasury Board
In office September 26, 1994 – November 3, 1995
| Premier | Jacques Parizeau |
| Vice President | Jacques Léonard |
| Preceded by | Monique Gagnon-Tremblay |
| Succeeded by | Jacques Léonard |
Minister of Manpower and Income Security
In office November 29, 1983 – December 12, 1985
| Premier | René Lévesque; Pierre-Marc Johnson |
| Preceded by | Pierre Marois |
| Succeeded by | Pierre Paradis |
Parliamentary constituencies
Member of the National Assembly
In office September 24, 2007 – April 7, 2014
| Preceded by | Rosaire Bertrand |
| Succeeded by | Caroline Simard |
| Constituency | Charlevoix–Côte-de-Beaupré (Charlevoix; 2007–2012) |
In office September 25, 1989 – March 20, 2006
| Preceded by | Claude Filion |
| Succeeded by | Marie Malavoy |
| Constituency | Taillon |
In office April 13, 1981 – December 2, 1985
| Preceded by | Riding established |
| Succeeded by | Lawrence Cannon |
| Constituency | La Peltrie |

Personal details
- Born: March 29, 1949 (age 77) Quebec City, Quebec, Canada
- Party: Parti Québécois
- Occupation: Politician; Civil Servant; Social worker
- Cabinet: Marois ministry

Pauline Marois (French: [pɔlin maʁwa]; born March 29, 1949) is a retired Canadian politician who served as the 30th premier of Quebec from 2012 to 2014. Marois had been a member of the National Assembly in various ridings since 1981 as a member of the Parti Québécois (PQ), serving as party leader from 2007 to 2014. She was the first female premier of Quebec.

Born in a working-class family, Marois studied social work at Université Laval, married businessman Claude Blanchet and became an activist in grassroots organizations and in the Parti Québécois (a social democratic party advocating Quebec's independence). After accepting political jobs in ministerial offices, she was first elected as a member of the National Assembly in 1981. At age 32, she was appointed to the cabinet for the first time as a junior minister in the René Lévesque government.

After being defeated as a PQ candidate in La Peltrie in the 1985 general election and in a by-election in 1988, she was elected as the member of the Quebec National Assembly for Taillon in the 1989 general election. With the return of the PQ to government in 1994, premiers Parizeau, Bouchard and Landry appointed Marois to senior positions in the Quebec cabinet. She was instrumental in crafting policies to end confessional school boards in the public education system, she restructured the tuition system in post-secondary education, implemented a subsidized daycare program, instituted pharmacare and parental-leave plans and slashed the Quebec deficit under Premier Bouchard's "deficit zero" agenda. In 2001, Premier Landry appointed her Deputy Premier of Quebec, becoming the third woman after Lise Bacon and Monique Gagnon-Tremblay to assume the second-highest role in the provincial government.

Following two failed leadership runs in 1985 and 2005, Marois briefly left political life in 2006. A year later, she stood unopposed to become the seventh leader of the Parti Québécois on June 26, 2007. From 2008 to 2012, she served as leader of the Official Opposition. In spite of internal strife in 2011 and early 2012, where she survived several challenges to her leadership from prominent members of her caucus – earning her the nickname Dame de béton, "Concrete Lady" – she led the Parti Québécois to victory with a minority government in the 2012 Quebec general election, thus becoming the first female premier in the province's history.

As Premier, Marois closed down Quebec's only nuclear reactor and ended asbestos production in Quebec. Her government's highest profile initiative was the proposal of a controversial Quebec Charter of Values which would have banned the province's 600,000 government employees from wearing religious symbols including turbans, Islamic veils and Jewish kippahs. However, the crucifix (notably, the one hung by above the speaker's chair in the provincial legislature) would not have been banned under the Quebec Charter of Values. Her party was defeated 19 months later in the 2014 Quebec general election, an election that she herself had called. Marois was personally defeated in the riding of Charlevoix–Côte-de-Beaupré and announced thereafter her resignation as PQ leader. Her electoral defeat marked the shortest stay of any Quebec provincial government since the Canadian Confederation and the lowest showing for the PQ since its first general election in 1970.

== Youth and early career ==
=== Early life ===
Marois was born at Saint-François d'Assise Hospital in Limoilou, a working-class neighborhood of Quebec City. A daughter of Marie-Paule (née Gingras) and Grégoire Marois, a heavy machinery mechanic, she is the oldest of five children. She was raised in a small two-story brick house built by her father in Saint-Étienne-de-Lauzon, a village now amalgamated with the city of Lévis, facing the provincial capital on the south shore of the Saint Lawrence River.

According to Marois, her parents were nationalists and devout Catholics, but remained rather uninvolved politically. Her mother's efforts to have the family recite the Holy Rosary at night generally lasted for two or three days. Marois has recalled that her father was sympathetic to the ideas of the Social Credit and the Union Nationale party; he kept current with the news and even bought the family a television set in the early 1950s.

During her youth, Marois recalls in her autobiography, published in 2008, her parents had "profound intuitions", and although her father regretted his own lack of status and education, he was ready to sacrifice to get a decent education for his children. Her three brothers, Denis, Robert and Marc, and her sister, Jeannine, would all graduate with university degrees.

She first attended the small parish school in nearby Saint-Rédempteur, where Marois recalls that she excelled in French, history and geography, developed an interest for reading and received numerous books as prizes for her academic achievements. At the age of 12, she was enrolled at Collège Jésus-Marie de Sillery, an exclusive, all-girl, Catholic private school attended by the offspring of the local bourgeoisie, an episode she describes as a "culture shock", leaving a permanent mark on her outlook and future choices.

According to her autobiography, Marois became aware of her lower social status in school and in the affluent houses of Sillery, where she sometimes gave a hand to her mother, who did housecleaning jobs to pay tuition. She was active in school clubs and describes herself as a good student, although she failed her English and Latin classes, momentarily putting her place in school in jeopardy.

=== Education ===
In 1968, she enrolled in the social work undergraduate program at Quebec City's Université Laval. At the time, Marois recalls, she was more interested in the condition of the poor and in international issues than other issues such as the status of the French language or the Quebec independence movement. According to her autobiography, she participated in a study on housing in the city's Lower Town and demonstrated against the Vietnam War.

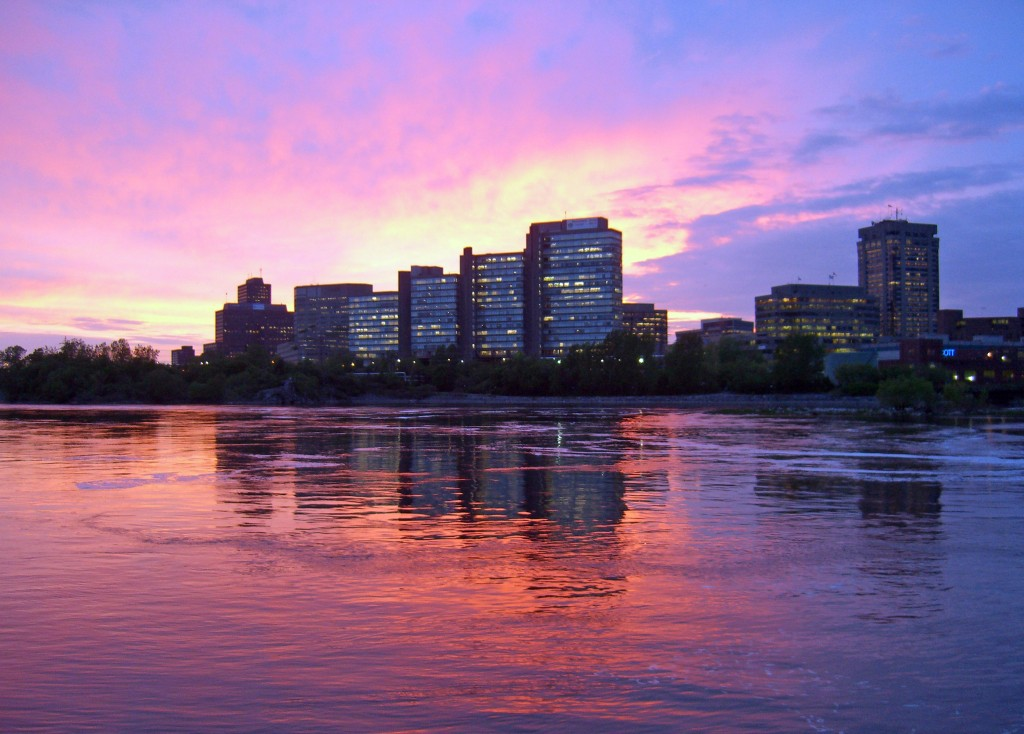
The construction of federal office buildings in Hull in the early 1970s.

The next year, she married Claude Blanchet, a young man from a nearby village and her high school sweetheart. Despite their differences – Blanchet was a budding entrepreneur who bought his first gas station at the age of 17, while a student in business administration — the young couple began a lifelong relationship.

In September 1970, she got an internship in Hull, where she helped with the creation of a local chapter of the Association coopérative d'économie familiale (ACEF) — a consumer advocacy group — while her husband was hired by Campeau Corporation, a real estate developer part of Power Corporation. At the time, the region was rapidly expanding due to the growth of the federal bureaucracy and the construction of administrative buildings on the Quebec side of the Ottawa River was met with opposition, according to Marois, because it did not take "into account the needs and the housing conditions of the local population."

This internship, which coincided with the October Crisis and her return to Quebec City to graduate at the spring of 1971, had a profound impact on Marois. "I arrived in the Outaouais as a French Canadian. I left the region identifying forever as a Quebecer", she declared in her 2008 autobiography, Québécoise!.

=== Early career ===
While gaining experience with several community organizations including launching CFVO-TV, a community television station in the Outaouais region, she lectured for some time in social work at the Cégep de Hull, and took a job as CEO of a CLSC. She also volunteered with the Parti Québécois, delivering barbecue chicken to election workers on election day in 1973. After moving to Montreal in July, she pursued a master of business administration (MBA) degree from HEC Montréal, where she took two classes with economist Jacques Parizeau. After graduating, she was hired as the head of the childhood services division at the Centre des services sociaux du Montréal Métropolitain.

In the fall of 1978, Marois left her public service job to join her former professor's office at the Department of Finance, but she left her press job after 6 months, feeling Parizeau wasn't "utilizing her to her full potential", she told the former premier's biographer, journalist Pierre Duchesne, a future minister in her own 2012 cabinet.

In November 1979, Lise Payette, the minister responsible for the condition of women, got Marois to join her office as chief of staff. According to René Lévesque's biographer, Pierre Godin, she hesitated before taking the job because she felt she was not feminist enough. "With me, you'll become one", Payette answered back.

== First political career ==
=== Minister in the René Lévesque government ===
Seven months pregnant, Marois hesitated before entering politics. After some support, both her husband and René Lévesque convinced her to run for the PQ in the 1981 general election. After winning a contested nomination, she ran in the La Peltrie electoral district and won with a 5,337-vote majority on her Liberal opponent, as one of only eight women being elected that year. (Note: Five PQs and three Liberals were elected as MNAs in 1981.) Only 11 days after becoming a member of the National Assembly of Quebec, she gave birth to her second child, Félix, on April 24.

Less than a week later, she joined the René Lévesque government as minister for the status of women, where the 32-year-old replaced her former boss, Lise Payette, who was not running in 1981. She was appointed as vice-chair of the Treasury Board in September 1982 and was promoted to minister of labour and income security, and minister responsible for the Outaouais region at the end of 1983.

Marois played a minor role in the turmoil and infighting that shook the Lévesque cabinet after the election of Brian Mulroney as the new Canadian prime minister, in the fall of 1984. She was first approached by Pierre-Marc Johnson, the leader of the kangaroo faction – favourable to reaching some accommodations with the new Conservative government —, but finally joined the more hardline group – the caribou —, who oppose the affirmation nationale agenda and call for the respect of PQ orthodoxy.

On November 9, 1984, she was one of the 12 signatories of a letter in which half of René Lévesque ministers disavowed the beau risque strategy advocated by the Premier and called upon him to put sovereignty at the heart of the next election campaign. However, she did not resign from her position as seven of her co-signatories did by the end of the month.

After Lévesque's resignation in June 1985, Marois entered the leadership race despite unfavourable polls. (Note: PQ pollster Michel Lepage polled party faithful in June 1985. Pierre Marc Johnson finished first with 67%, Bernard Landry ran a distant second at 14% and Marois ended up third with only 4.2% of support, notes Godin (2005, p. 494).) Running on a full-employment and sovereignty platform, Marois finished in second place with 19,471 (19.7%) votes, a far cry from the 56,925 (58.7%) cast for the new leader, Pierre Marc Johnson.

=== Opposition MNA ===
After being defeated in the 1985 general election by Liberal candidate Lawrence Cannon, she joined the feminist movement and became treasurer of the Fédération des femmes du Québec and a consultant with the Elizabeth Fry Society, while lecturing at Université du Québec à Hull.

Marois remained in the party's executive until the end of her term, in the spring of 1987. After Johnson left a party in shambles six months later, (Note: The PQ lost 100,000 members from 1981 to 1987, according to Duchesne (2004, p. 79).) she decided not to run for party leader mainly for personal reasons. In an interview she gave Le Devoir in late January 1988, she took shots at the front runner and former colleague, Jacques Parizeau, criticizing his "unacceptable attitude towards women and his outdated conception of social democracy".

Less than 10 days later, Parizeau met Marois and convinced her to return to the PQ national executive as the person in charge of the party platform and asked her to run in the Anjou district, left vacant by Johnson's resignation. On June 20, 1988, Marois came second with 44.8% behind René Serge Larouche of the Liberals.

Marois ran again as a candidate in the Longueuil-based riding of Taillon, which had once been held by Lévesque. She was elected in September 1989 general election. She entered Parizeau's shadow cabinet as the Official opposition critic for industry and trade in 1989 and became Treasury Board and public administration critic in 1991. She was also a PQ representative on the Bélanger-Campeau Commission set up by Premier Robert Bourassa after the failure of the Meech Lake Accord.

=== "Minister of Everything" ===
Re-elected for a second term in 1994, Marois became one of the most important ministers in the successive PQ governments of Premiers Jacques Parizeau, Lucien Bouchard and Bernard Landry. In nine years, she dominated over the Quebec political scene. She became the only politician in Quebec history to hold the "three pillars of government" — the Finance, Education and Health portfolios.

She was first appointed as the chair of the Treasury Board and the minister of family in the Jacques Parizeau government. After the narrow defeat in the 1995 sovereignty referendum, she briefly held the finance portfolio before being reassigned to head the Department of Education by the new Premier Lucien Bouchard.

During her tenure as minister of education, she proposed lifting the two-decades-long tuition freeze on higher education in Quebec. This proposal was met with fierce resistance from students' federations who initiated the 1996 Quebec student protests. In the end, the PQ government reinstated the tuition freeze, but Marois introduced policies that would charge an out-of-province fee to non-Quebec Canadian students, and a fee for failing CEGEP courses. She also successfully piloted Bill 109, replacing of confessional school boards by language-based ones implementing a bilateral amendment to the Canadian constitution with the Jean Chrétien's Liberal government in Ottawa in 1997.

Although Marois was widely perceived as a staunch supporter of the centre-right direction of the PQ under Lucien Bouchard who promised "zero deficit" to gain winning conditions for a future referendum on Quebec sovereignty, the government's capitulation in the student protests was seen as a political move to ensure student support in the upcoming general election. Historically, students had been a key voting bloc for the PQ.

She also introduced a 5-dollar-a-day subsidized daycare program in 1997, which proved popular with working families.

In the Parti Québécois's second term, Marois became Minister of Health between 1998 and 2001. Bernard Landry named her the deputy premier and minister of finance, positions she held for two years. By 2003, she had occupied 15 different ministries and was instrumental in the legacy of the second PQ government (1994–2003).

During her years as Cabinet minister, Marois' husband, Claude Blanchet, was named president of the Société générale de financement (SGF), the investment arm of the Quebec government. His substantial personal investments in public companies doing business with the government have put Marois into an uncomfortable position as a political figure, especially during the years she was minister of finance and deputy premier.

=== Second leadership race ===
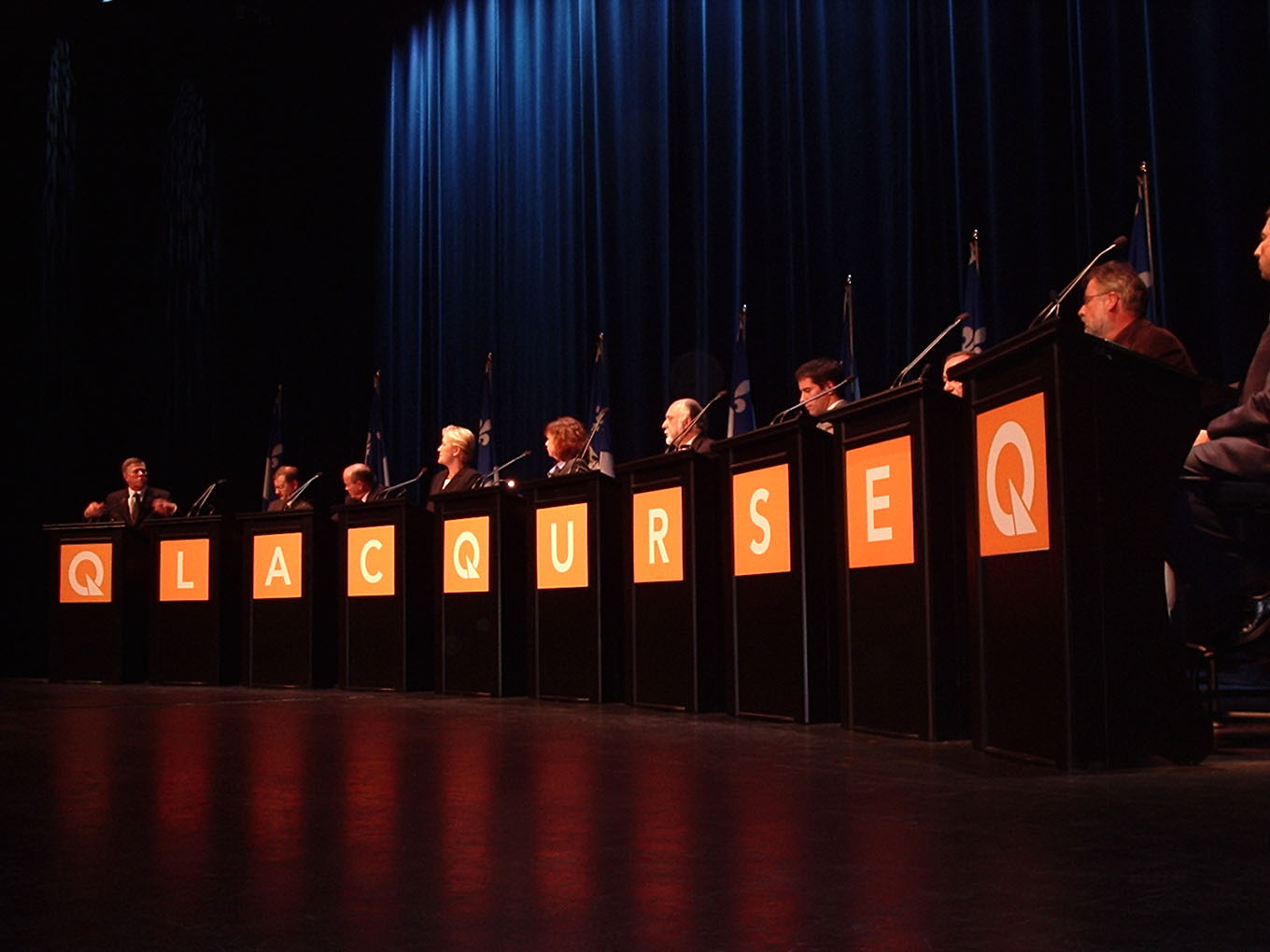
The Quebec City candidates debate during the 2005 PQ leadership campaign.

She quickly started to organize her leadership bid following the PQ electoral defeat of 2003. Her close supporters founded Groupe réflexion Québec, which served as a think tank. Her key organizers were Danielle Rioux, Nicole Léger, Nicolas Girard, Nicole Stafford, Joseph Facal and Pierre Langlois.

Marois announced her candidacy in the election for the leadership of the PQ following the sudden resignation of Landry in June 2005. She won 30.6% of the vote, placing second to André Boisclair.

Although many in the PQ saw her as one of the most influential ministers ever to serve in Quebec's history, raising expectations that she would one day lead the party back to victory, Marois retired from the National Assembly in March 2006, stating that after 25 years in elected politics, it was time for her to pursue other interests. She vowed to remain active in the PQ, and reaffirmed her confidence in Boisclair's leadership. She was succeeded as MNA for Taillon by Marie Malavoy.

== Leader of the Parti Québécois ==
=== Third leadership race ===
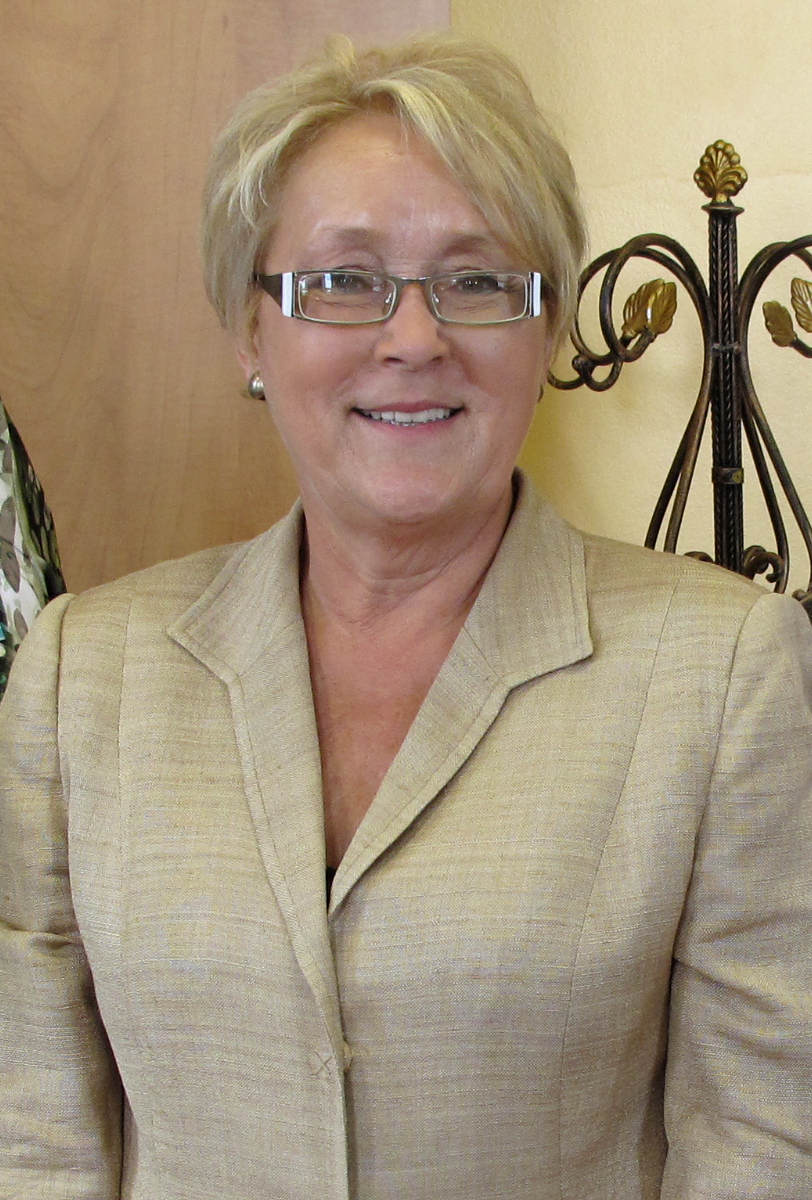
Pauline Marois, August 30, 2011

In the March 26, 2007, Quebec provincial election, the Parti Québécois was reduced to third place in the National Assembly, behind both the governing Quebec Liberal Party and the opposition Action démocratique du Québec. Following this disappointing result, PQ leader André Boisclair announced his resignation as leader on May 8, 2007. Marois was considered a leading candidate to replace Boisclair, especially following federal Bloc Québécois leader Gilles Duceppe's withdrawal from the race.

On May 11, 2007, Marois announced that she would run again for leader of the PQ for the third time.

No other candidate stepped forward to contest the election, and Marois was acclaimed leader on June 27, 2007. She led the party from outside the National Assembly until winning the Charlevoix by-election on September 24.

=== 2007 by-election ===
On August 13, 2007, Marois announced her candidacy for the riding of Charlevoix, after the incumbent, Rosaire Bertrand, retired from politics after 13 years as the MNA. The by-election was held on September 24, 2007. Marois did not compete against a candidate from the minority governing Liberal party, which chose not to present an opposing candidate, but did face Action démocratique du Québec candidate Conrad Harvey, who had been a candidate in the same riding against Bertrand in the 2007 general elections, and won with 58.2% of the popular vote.

Marois's campaign signs displayed her image on a blue-green background along with the slogan "Chez nous, c'est Pauline" in an effort to claim a return to the PQ's nationalist beginnings. This attempt to present a populist image clashed with Marois's affluent lifestyle, epitomized for many voters in the 12,000-square-foot mansion that Marois then occupied on Île-Bizard, and later sold in January 2012 for nearly seven million dollars.

Canadian tradition holds that, in a by-election, a party leader without a seat is allowed to run unopposed by other major parties. Also, the leaders of other parties are expected not to campaign in the riding where the seatless leader is seeking election. This principle was respected by the other Quebec parties during Marois's 2007 campaign. Marois herself, however, broke with tradition when she campaigned for a PQ candidate in a by-election against Liberal party leader Robert Bourassa in 1985, as did also PQ leader René Lévesque.

As in most by-elections, voter turnout in the riding won by Marois was low, with only 13.18 per cent of the 33,156 Charlevoix voters turning up at the advance poll and an overall turnout of about 58%.

Immediately after being named the new leader of the PQ, Marois conducted a major shuffle of the shadow cabinet. François Gendron was named the new house leader, replacing Diane Lemieux. Lemieux was offered the position of caucus chair by Marois, but refused to indicate her disagreement and furthermore stated her intention to resign her seat in Bourget.

Marois stated that the project of holding a referendum on sovereignty would be put on hold indefinitely, indicating that this would not be her main objective.

In September 2007, she proposed a strategic plan for helping the forestry sector, which has been hard hit in recent years by the closure of several mills in western and central Quebec. Measures proposed included an increase in protected forest space, an increase of productivity by developing the second and third transformation of wood and incentives to encourage the usage of wood from Quebec for construction projects.

In November 2007, when Mario Dumont suggested the elimination of school boards and proposed a motion to topple the government in the wake of poor voting turnouts during the school elections on November 4, 2007, the PQ and the Liberals both disagreed, stating that this reflected a lack of judgment by the ADQ leader. Marois nevertheless added that she was open to the idea of structural changes to the school boards.

=== Leader of the Opposition ===
Not long after the re-election of Stephen Harper's Conservative federal government to a second minority government, and with the 2008 financial crisis increasingly coming to the foreground of current events, Jean Charest precipitated the fall of his own minority government, arguing before the lieutenant governor of Quebec that the National Assembly was no longer functional. Obtaining the right to dissolve the parliament, an election was called in Quebec.

The PQ campaign was largely seen as lacking momentum until Marois’ performance in the televised debate against Charest and Mario Dumont brought new enthusiasm to the party. Benefiting from the collapse the Action démocratique du Québec, Marois increased the PQ representation in the National Assembly by 15 seats and increased her party's share of the popular vote by almost 7 points to 35.2% in the 2008. While the PQ did not win the election or prevent the Liberals from obtaining a majority, their return to the status of official opposition, the unexpectedly large number of seats obtained (51), and the ADQ's effective marginalization were seen as a moral victory by supporters. Marois thus became the first woman to be elected leader of the Official Opposition in Quebec.

Marois and her caucus aggressively pursued the Liberal government over allegations surfacing in the media of corruption, collusion and illegal political financing related to provincial and municipal contracts; at one point her caucus donned white scarves to demand an inquiry, forcing the government to set up a public inquiry in the fall of 2011, the Charbonneau Commission. This commission has revealed a pattern of illegal payments dating back several decades and involving all political parties.

In another scandal, after weeks of pointed questioning by PQ critic Nicolas Girard, Family minister Tony Tomassi resigned in May 2010 over allegations of improperly receiving and using a private company credit card to pay for expenses in exchanges for daycare licences.

On the French language, Marois resisted restricting admission to English-language CEGEPs, but endorsed such a measure before a leadership confidence ballot. (She later withdrew the promise after she became premier.)

But soon after winning a confidence vote of 93.6% of the delegates at the April 2011 party convention, two crises shook the PQ leader. Two weeks after her confidence vote, the Bloc Québécois lost all but four of its seats in the House of Commons of Canada in the May 2 federal election, soon followed by a confidence crisis caused by a private bill introduced by Marois loyalist Agnès Maltais facilitating the construction of a publicly funded multipurpose amphitheatre to replace the aging Colisée Pepsi in Quebec City. Marois` insistence on maintaining the party line caused a revolt. Marois had previously resisted popular initiative referendums, but supported them to retain her leadership during this crisis (but not after she won power.) One result was the resignation of four heavyweights in her caucus: Louise Beaudoin, Pierre Curzi, Lisette Lapointe and Jean-Martin Aussant.

== Premier of Quebec ==
=== 2012 general election ===
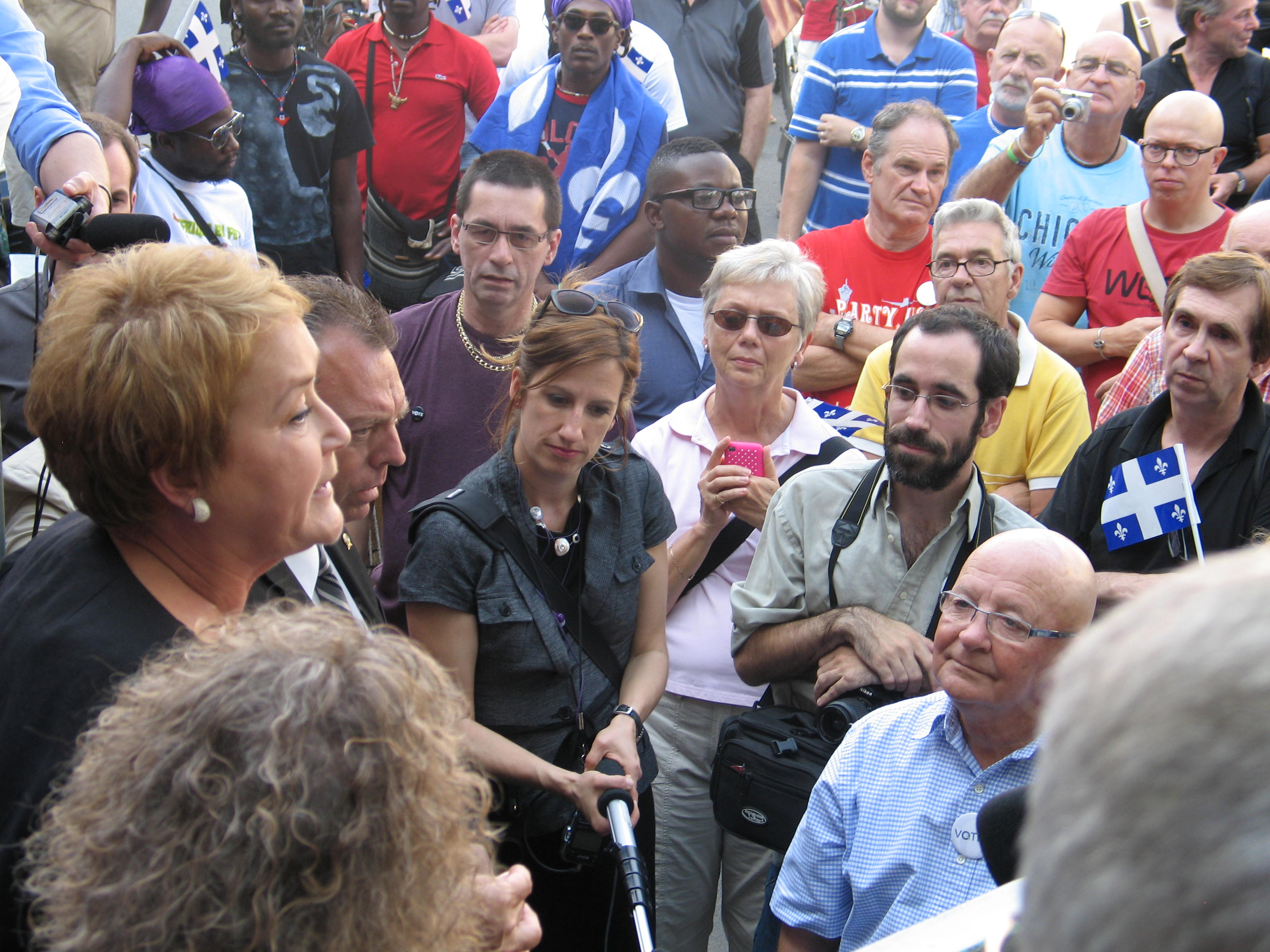
Pauline Marois addresses a crowd of supporters in Quebec City on the eve of the 2012 general election.

On September 4, 2012, Marois won the election and was elected in the riding of Charlevoix–Côte-de-Beaupré. She became the first woman to be sworn is as premier of Quebec on September 17. She is the sixth woman to serve as the premier of a Canadian province.

Her party won 54 of the 125 seats in the National Assembly, as a minority government. Marois plans to abolish the increase in student tuition fees which had paralyzed the previous government for 8 months. She also wants to abolish Hydro Quebec's 3.9% increase in electricity rates, the 200-dollar medical fee for all individuals living in Quebec, and the increase in daycare centre fees.

=== Metropolis shooting ===
While Marois was giving her victory speech, a man named as Richard Henry Bain attempted to enter from the side door of the Métropolis. A technician at the venue, Denis Blanchette, 48, attempted to prevent him from entering and was shot and killed by Richard Bain. Another technician was injured from the bullet that ricocheted off Blanchette. Richard Henry Bain, from Mont-Tremblant, had a semi-automatic rifle, type CZ-858 and a pistol. Bain's rifle became jammed, preventing further violence.

Following the shots fired, two Sûreté du Québec guards took Marois away from centre stage to the immediate hallway, and away from television cameras. A few minutes later, Marois returned to calm down the crowd and ask them to leave quietly.

On September 10, 2012, a civic funeral was held for Denis Blanchette where Marois attended along with other important political leaders from Quebec.

=== Premiership ===
Heading the third minority government in the history of Quebec – and the second in the last decade – Marois took two weeks to craft her cabinet, naming 25 ministers on September 19. At its first meeting, the new Marois government was quick to honour campaign commitments and cancelled a slew of decisions of the outgoing Charest administration. The Marois government suspended most sections of Bill 78, an emergency bill aimed at stopping the 2012 Quebec student protests, cancelled a loan guarantee to restart the Jeffrey asbestos mine in Val-des-Sources and abandoned the Gentilly-2 Nuclear Generating Station refurbishment project.

Marois laid out an agenda designed to promote "sovereigntist governance" in relations with the rest of Canada, to return Quebec to balanced budgets through higher taxes and debt reduction, to increase the use of French in public services, and to address resource development in Northern Quebec. Many aspects of these policies – such as restrictions on the use of English and on access to higher Education in English – occurred at a time when the use of French in commerce, education, and the workforce is increasing in Quebecand are widely viewed as an affront to immigrants and to citizens whose mother tongue is not French. Such measures have also been questioned by native speakers of French, who recognize the benefits of a knowledge of other languages, including English, and the fact that the knowledge of other languages will not cause them to abandon French as their primary language.

Marois then called the National Assembly into session at the end of October. Soon after, her democratic reform minister, Bernard Drainville, introduced Bills 1 and 2 to strengthen rules on contracts and banish unreputable government contractors from doing business with the Quebec government and affiliated entities. The second one establishes a new political financing framework financed almost entirely on public funding. The bill also limits political contributions to provincial parties at C$100 a year ($200 in election years). (Note: The previous limit of $1,000 was adopted under the previous Liberal government, and is much less than the $3,000 limit established in the original legislation passed by the Lévesque government in the 1970s) The new system finances from the cancellation of the political donations tax credit.

Finance and economy minister Nicolas Marceau introduced his 2013–2014 budget in the fall. The budget laid out revenues, without specifying expenditures. These were presented later, after the budget had passed. The budget projects a break-even operating balance by the end of fiscal year 2013/14 mainly by slowing down the rate of growth of public spending. The budget implemented higher taxes on tobacco and alcohol and modifies – but didn't cancel outright – the $200 health tax passed in Raymond Bachand's 2010 budget, adding an element of progressiveness to it. The Marceau budget also changed the planned increase to the low-cost heritage pool electricity sold by Hydro-Québec to every Quebecker. Instead of raising the heritage pool price from 2.79 to 3.79¢/kWh from 2014 to 2018 as set by the previous government in 2010, the PQ government chose to let the rate increase with inflation while asking government-owned Hydro-Québec to increase its dividend. The budget narrowly passed on November 30, 2012, in spite of objections by the Liberals and CAQ. Subsequent to passage of the budget, the PQ government announced increased expenditures in the area of subsidized child care, while cutting payments to universities. The latter cuts to university funding included a retroactive cut of $124 million in the 2012–2013 fiscal year, an action criticized by both university rectors and student leaders.

=== 2014 general election ===
The 41st Quebec general election pertained to the election of members to the National Assembly of Quebec. The election was announced on March 5 by Lieutenant Governor Pierre Duchesne upon the request of Marois. She ran as leader of the Parti Québécois in the seat of Charlevoix-Côte-de-Beaupré. Her primary opponents in the election were Philippe Couillard of the Quebec Liberal Party, François Legault of the Coalition Avenir Québec, and Françoise David of Québec solidaire.

At the beginning of the election, polls showed Marois having a lead over Couillard and Legault, with Marois placing at 37% support compared to a 34% support for Philippe Couillard. Contrarily, Marois also was much more favoured by French Quebecers; she held a lead of almost 20%.

Five days before the election, she saw a sudden negative backlash according to an Ipsos-Reid poll, with Liberal support sitting at 37 per cent among decided voters while support for Marois and the PQ went down four points to 28 percent. However, the polls had already turned against the PQ after media magnate Pierre Karl Péladeau joined the party ticket. Péladeau's past history as a union-buster didn't play well in a province that was 40 percent unionized, and didn't seem to mesh with the social democratic PQ. At the same time, his call for a third referendum on sovereignty turned off voters who weren't willing to vote on the issue again. According to The Globe and Mail, the PQ's polling numbers flatlined after Péladeau entered the campaign and never recovered.

After a turbulent campaign which focussed on the prospect of a referendum on sovereignty, Marois' government was defeated in the April 7 election which elected a majority Liberal government and saw the PQ suffer its worst defeat in terms of popular vote since 1970, with approximately 25% of the vote. Her defeat included the surprise loss of her own seat of Charlevoix-Côte-de-Beaupré by 882 votes to Caroline Simard, whom supporters of Marois had widely accused of being a Liberal Party paper candidate. Marois's defeat marked the end of a 20-year hold on the district.

In her concession speech, Marois resigned as Parti Québécois leader, after thanking her supporters and the people of Charlevoix-Côte-de-Beaupré.

== Issues ==
=== Identity and language ===
On October 18, 2007, Marois proposed Bill 195, the Quebec Identity Act, which included a requirement that immigrants must learn French to obtain rights, including a putative Quebec citizenship and the right to run in elections at all levels. The bill also proposed the fundamental values of Quebec should be taken into account in a future constitution, including equality between sexes and the predominance of French.

The idea was met with criticism amongst various minority groups. The Quebec Liberal Party also dismissed some of the measures as divisive and harmful. House Leader Jean-Marc Fournier also made a parallel between the proposed bill and Jacques Parizeau's "Money and the ethnic vote" speech following the 1995 referendum, while Cabinet Minister Benoit Pelletier added that it would violate the Canadian Charter of Rights and Freedoms. Many current and past members of the Parti Québécois also rejected this proposal, including Bernard Landry.

Outside Quebec, several newspapers described the bill as racist. Don Martin, columnist for the National Post, wrote that the population should try to stop the "racism" taking place in Quebec. While the vast majority of Quebec non-francophones were opposed, it was supported by a narrow majority of francophones. However, the Liberals and the ADQ stated that they would defeat Bill 195.

In April 2008, Marois proposed a major rewrite of Bill 101, the Charter of the French Language, in light of concerns of a purported decline of French language in the province—particularly in the Montreal region. Her proposals included more French courses in elementary and secondary schools, a requirement for new arrivals to learn French and for the extension of French language requirements to be applied to small businesses as well as for more power for the Office québécois de la langue française.

=== Quebec Charter of Values and claims of antisemitism and Islamophobia ===
Criticism for the Quebec charter of values have come from both academics and members within the party. Paul Bramadat, director of the Centre for Studies in Religion and Society at the University of Victoria, noted that the bill would be recognized as hypocritical by many. Mark Mercer, professor of philosophy at Saint Mary's University in Halifax, described the bill as "appalling". Louise Harel, a former interim leader of the PQ, called the policy "un repli identitaire"—an assertion of identity that would alienate and mobilize immigrant groups against the PQ. In reply to the Charter of Values, the Deputy Chief of Staff for Minister Jean-François Lisée, resigned his post with the PQ stating that her conscience would not allow her to defend the campaign. The Montreal Jewish General Hospital leadership criticized the charter of values, suggesting that a third of its staff would be forced to give up their employment because they wear kippahs, hijabs or turbans. The PQ, whose leaders have been treated at the Jewish General in the past, later added an exemption to the Charter that would apply strictly to the Hospital. In response, Dr. Lawrence Rosenberg, director of the hospital, replied that it would not apply for an exemption, and condemned the charter as discriminatory stating: "Since the bill is inherently prejudicial, there is no point in taking advantage of any clause that would grant us temporary, short-term relief. ... This bill is flawed and contrary to Quebec's spirit of inclusiveness and tolerance."

In June 2013, Marois announced her support of the Quebec Soccer Federation's ban on turbans within the federation. This ban has led to the Quebec Soccer Federation being suspended by the Canadian Soccer Federation, which resulted in Marois suggesting that the CSF has no authority over provincial organizations. Marois's stance has received significant criticism for its use of identity politics. In March 2014, Marois said on Radio Canada that "there is a risk" associated with radical Islam in Canada.

In March 2014, Marois was accused of antisemitism by The Center for Israel and Jewish Affairs (CIJA) surrounding the statements made by party member Louise Mailloux. Mailloux had written statements equating the Jewish practice of circumcision to rape and claimed that halal and kosher food prices were kept high to fund religious activities abroad. She wrote that the money went to: "For the Jews, to finance Israel's colonization in Palestinian territories? And for Muslims, to fund the Muslim Brotherhood, the Islamists who want to impose Islam worldwide?" Marois defended Mailloux, denying antisemitism within the party and stated that she had "very good relations with the leaders of this community and the leaders of all the different communities in Quebec." CIJA claimed Marois's apology and statements were inadequate and "meaningless excuses" with CIJA Quebec vice-president, Luciano Del Negro, stating: "She alleges a misunderstanding and refuses to basically recognize her views are not only offensive, but anti-Semitic in nature."

=== International affairs ===
Marois involved herself in international affairs in her first months of office. In mid-October 2012, she participated at the Francophonie Summit in Kinshasa, but declined to meet with host, Democratic Republic of the Congo's President Joseph Kabila, who was reelected in a contested general election in 2011. Marois also expressed her concerns with the withdrawal of Canadian aid agencies and funding of Africa among other places, consistent with her party agenda to increase Quebec's participation in international aid and maintain a "pacifist army" in an independent Quebec.

In December, she visited New York City and a month later attended the World Economic Forum in Davos to meet investors and political leaders, including African Union president Thomas Boni Yayi, Mexico's Finance Secretary Luis Videgaray Caso, European commissioner Michel Barnier, French Economy Minister Pierre Moscovici and the Minister-President of North Rhine-Westphalia, Hannelore Kraft.

== Personal life ==
She is married to Claude Blanchet, former head of the Fonds de solidarité FTQ and Quebec's Société générale de financement, and is the mother of four children: Catherine (born June 1979), Félix (born April 1981), François-Christophe (born October 1983) and Jean-Sébastien (born July 1985).

Marois is an atheist.

== Honours ==
In 2019, she received an honorary doctorate from the Université du Québec en Outaouais.

== Electoral record ==
2012 Quebec general election: Charlevoix–Côte-de-Beaupré
| Party | Candidate | Votes | % | ±% |
|---|---|---|---|---|
| Parti Québécois | Pauline Marois | 15,472 | 40.65 | |
| Liberal | Claire Rémillard | 10,301 | 27.06 | |
| Coalition Avenir Québec | Ian Latrémouille | 10,203 | 26.80 | |
| Québec solidaire | André Jacob | 1,227 | 3.22 | |
| Option nationale | Pierre Tremblay | 619 | 1.63 | |
| Coalition pour la constituante | Daniel Laforest | 243 | 0.64 | |
| Total valid votes | | 38,065 | 98.82 | |
| Total rejected ballots | | 456 | 1.18 | |
| Turnout | | 38,521 | 75.95 | |
| Electors on the lists | | 50,717 | – | |

2014 Quebec general election: Charlevoix–Côte-de-Beaupré
| Party | Candidate | Votes | % | ±% |
|---|---|---|---|---|
| Liberal | Caroline Simard | 13,083 | 35.24 | +8.18 |
| Parti Québécois | Pauline Marois | 12,201 | 32.87 | -7.78 |
| Coalition Avenir Québec | Ian Latrémouille | 9,682 | 26.08 | -0.72 |
| Québec solidaire | Jean-Yves Bernard | 1,539 | 4.15 | +0.93 |
| Conservative | Chantal Mélançon | 332 | 0.89 | – |
| Option nationale | François Thériault | 287 | 0.77 | -0.86 |
| Total valid votes | | 37,124 | 98.74 | – |
| Total rejected ballots | | 472 | 1.26 | – |
| Turnout | | 37,596 | 73.48 | -2.47 |
| Electors on the lists | | 51,165 | – | – |

== Works cited ==
- Bernier Arcand, Philippe (2019). “Pauline Marois’s Paradoxical Record as Quebec Premier,” in Sylvia Bashevkin, ed., Doing Politics Differently? Women Premiers in Canada's Provinces and Territories. Vancouver: UBC Press. Chap. 7. ISBN 9780774860819
- Duchesne, Pierre (2002). Jacques Parizeau. Volume 2: Le Baron, 1970–1985 (in French). Montreal: Québec Amérique. 535 p. ISBN 2-7644-0153-1.
- Duchesne, Pierre (2004). Jacques Parizeau. Volume 3: Le Régent, 1985-1995 (in French). Montreal: Québec Amérique. 601 p. ISBN 2-7644-0280-5.
- Godin, Pierre (2001). René Lévesque. Volume 3: L'espoir et le chagrin (1976-1980) (in French). Montreal: Boréal. 631 p. ISBN 2-7646-0105-0.
- Godin, Pierre (2005). René Lévesque. Volume 4: L'homme brisé (1980-1987) (in French). Montreal: Boréal. 604 p. ISBN 2-7646-0424-6.
- Marois, Pauline; Graveline, Pierre (2008). Québécoise ! (in French). Montreal: Fides. 261 p. ISBN 9782762127676.
- Mercier, Noémi (September 1, 2012). "Pauline Marois: l'étoffe d'un premier ministre?". L'actualité (in French). Montreal. pp. 29–44.
- Tardy, Évelyne (2003). Égalité hommes-femmes? Le militantisme au Québec : le PLQ et le PQ (in French). Montreal: Hurtubise-HMH. 222 p. ISBN 2-89428-643-0.

Political offices
| Preceded by Jean Campeau | Minister of Finance; 1995–1996 | Succeeded by Bernard Landry |
| Preceded by Jean Garon | Minister of Education; 1996–1998 | Succeeded by François Legault |
| Preceded by Jean Rochon | Minister of Health and Social Services; 1998–2001 | Succeeded by Rémy Trudel |
| Preceded by Bernard Landry | Minister of Finance; 2001–2003 | Succeeded by Yves Séguin |
| Preceded by Bernard Landry | Deputy Premier of Quebec; 2001–2003 | Succeeded by Monique Gagnon-Tremblay |
