= Nicole Stafford =

- Occupation: Civil Servant

Nicole Stafford is a political strategist and diplomat in Quebec.

She was director of public relations for the 1st World Outgames in 2006. She held a number of senior Quebec government positions, including chief of staff for Pauline Marois and Deputy Minister of the Executive Council, and was Quebec's delegate general (the equivalent of an ambassador) to Brussels, Belgium. Earlier, she was a vice-president of a public relations firm.
