= Rivière des Monts =

Location
- Country: Canada
- Province: Quebec
- Region: Capitale-Nationale
- Regional County Municipality: Charlevoix Regional County Municipality
- Unorganized territory and municipality: Saint-Urbain

Physical characteristics
- Source: Unidentified little lake
  - location: Lac-Pikauba
  - coordinates: 47.66371°N 70.72220°W
  - elevation: 796 m (2,612 ft)
- Mouth: Le Gros Bras
  - location: Saint-Urbain
  - coordinates: 47.62139°N 70.60139°W
  - elevation: 329 m (1,079 ft)
- Length: 8.6 km (5.3 mi)

Basin features
- Tributaries
  - left: (upstream from the mouth) outlet from Lac à Moïse
  - right: (upstream from the mouth) a wild stream, discharge from Lac Michel and Plaisant Pond.

The Rivière des Monts (English: River of the Mounts) is a tributary of the southwest bank of the lower part of the watercourse Le Gros Bras, flowing in the non organized from Lac-Pikauba and the municipality of Saint-Urbain, in the Charlevoix Regional County Municipality, in the administrative region of Capitale-Nationale, in the province of Quebec, in Canada.

The lower part of this valley is mainly served by a few forest roads which connect to the north with the Parc-des-Grands-Jardins road. The upper part of this valley is served by a few other forest roads which also serve Lac Chambers and Lac Carbonel to the south. Forestry is the main economic activity in this valley; recreational tourism, second.

The surface of the lower part of Le Petit Bras is generally frozen from the beginning of December until the beginning of April; however, safe circulation on the ice is generally done from mid-December to the end of March. The upper part of this stream has a freezing period of about an additional week. The water level of the river varies with the seasons and the precipitation; the spring flood generally occurs in April.

== Geography ==
The Rivière des Monts rises at the mouth of a small lake (altitude: 796 metres (2,612 ft)) located in a forest area in a valley between Lac Saint-Denys (located on the north side) and the Thomas-Fortin Lake (located on the southwest side). This source of the river is located at:

- 0.7 kilometres (0.43 mi) east of the limit of Lac-Pikauba and Saint-Urbain;
- 8.4 kilometres (5.2 mi) east of the course of the upper part of the Malbaie River;
- 18.1 kilometres (11.2 mi) north-west of the village center of Saint-Urbain;
- 17.2 kilometres (10.7 mi) north-west of the mouth of Le Gros Bras (confluence with the Gouffre river);
- 29.6 kilometres (18.4 mi) north-west of Baie-Saint-Paul town center.

From its source, the course of the Monts river descends on 8.6 kilometres (5.3 mi) in a generally deep valley, with a drop of 467 metres (1,532 ft), according to the following segments:

- 3.1 kilometres (1.9 mi) first towards the south-east in a plain, then towards the north-east in an increasingly deep valley, until the discharge (coming from the south-west) from Lac Michel and Plaisant Pond;
- 0.6 kilometres (0.37 mi) east in a deep valley, to the outlet (coming from the northwest) from Lac à Moïse;
- 3.0 kilometres (1.9 mi) north-east to a bend in the river; then south-east in a deep valley, to a stream (coming from the south-west);
- 1.9 kilometres (1.2 mi) towards the east, passing on the north side of Mont du Gros Ruisseau, to its mouth.

The Rivière des Monts flows on the southwest bank of the Le Gros Bras stream, in the municipality of Saint-Urbain. This mouth is located at:

- 0.1 kilometres (0.062 mi) southwest of route 381;
- 2.9 kilometres (1.8 mi) south-west of Lac des Cygnes;
- 11.6 kilometres (7.2 mi) north-west of the village center of Saint-Urbain;
- 18.5 kilometres (11.5 mi) west of the village center of Saint-Hilarion;
- 24.3 kilometres (15.1 mi) north-west of Baie-Saint-Paul town center.

From the mouth of the Monts river, the current descends on 9.5 kilometres (5.9 mi) following the course of Le Gros Bras towards the south- East; then on 25.3 kilometres (15.7 mi) with a drop of 56 metres (184 ft) following the course of the rivière du Gouffre which flows into Baie-Saint-Paul in the St. Lawrence River.

== Toponymy ==
This toponymic designation appears on a 1996 map.

The toponym “Rivière des Monts” was formalized on March 25, 1997 at the Place Names Bank of the Commission de toponymie du Québec.

== Appendices ==
=== Related articles ===
- Charlevoix Regional County Municipality
- Lac-Pikauba, an unorganized territory
- Saint-Urbain, a municipality
- Bras Nord de la rivière des Monts
- Le Gros Bras (Gouffre River tributary)
- Rivière du Gouffre
- St. Lawrence River
- List of rivers of Quebec
