= Pierre D'Auteuil =

Canadian lawyer, politician and judge (1857–1933)

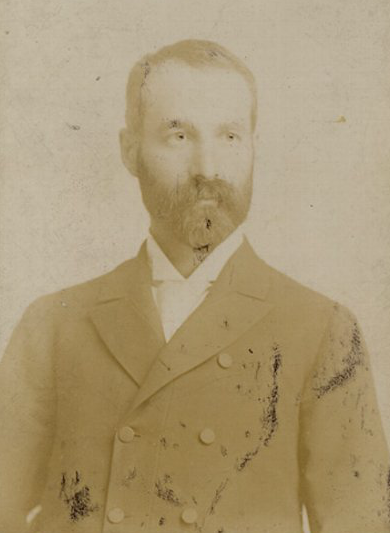

Member of the Legislative Assembly of Quebec for Charlevoix
- In office 1897–1900
- Preceded by: Joseph Morin
- Succeeded by: Joseph Morin
- In office 1904–1919
- Preceded by: Joseph Morin
- Succeeded by: Philippe Dufour

Personal details
- Born: April 2, 1857 Rivière-Ouelle, Canada East
- Died: December 11, 1933 (aged 76) Quebec City, Quebec
- Party: Conservative

Pierre D'Auteuil (April 2, 1857 – December 11, 1933) was a Canadian lawyer, politician and judge.

Born in Rivière-Ouelle, Canada East, D'Auteuil was educated at the Séminaire de Québec and at the Université Laval. He was called to the Bar of Quebec in 1881 and created a King's Counsel in 1906.

A lawyer, he was mayor of Baie-Saint-Paul, Quebec from 1897 to 1901. He was elected to the Legislative Assembly of Quebec for Charlevoix in 1897. A Conservative, he did not run in 1900. He was elected again in 1904 and 1908, and then again (in Charlevoix—Saguenay) in 1912, and 1916. He was defeated in 1919.

In 1921, he was made a judge of the Quebec Superior Court.
