= Charlevoix (provincial electoral district) =

Former provincial electoral district in Quebec, Canada

Quebec electoral district

Defunct provincial electoral district
- Legislature: National Assembly of Quebec
- District created: 1867
- District abolished: 1912
- District re-created: 1945
- District re-abolished: 2011
- First contested: 1867
- Last contested: 2008

Demographics
- Population (2006): 40,719
- Electors (2008): 33,305
- Area (km²): 7,307.9
- Census division(s): Charlevoix, Charlevoix-Est, La Côte-de-Beaupré
- Census subdivision(s): Baie-Sainte-Catherine, Baie-Saint-Paul, Beaupré, Clermont, La Malbaie, Les Éboulements, L'Isle-aux-Coudres, Notre-Dame-des-Monts, Petite-Rivière-Saint-François, Saint-Aimé-des-Lacs, Sainte-Anne-de-Beaupré, Saint-Ferréol-les-Neiges, Saint-Hilarion, Saint-Irénée, Saint-Joachim, Saint-Louis-de-Gonzague-du-Cap-Tourmente, Saint-Siméon, Saint-Tite-des-Caps, Saint-Urbain; Lac-Jacques-Cartier (part), Lac-Pikauba, Mont-Élie, Sagard, Sault-au-Cochon

Charlevoix (French pronunciation: [ʃaʁləvwa]) is a former provincial electoral district in the Capitale-Nationale region of Quebec, Canada, which elected members to the National Assembly of Quebec. As of its final election, it included the municipalities of La Malbaie, Saint-Siméon, Baie-Saint-Paul and Baie-Sainte-Catherine.

It was created for the 1867 election (and an electoral district of that name existed earlier in the Legislative Assembly of the Province of Canada). Its final election was in 1908. It disappeared in the 1912 election and its successor electoral district was Charlevoix—Saguenay.

It was recreated for the 1948 election and its final election was in 2008. It disappeared again in the 2012 election, and its successor electoral district was Charlevoix–Côte-de-Beaupré.

== Members of the Legislative Assembly / National Assembly ==
- Léon-Charles Clément, Conservative (1867–1871)
- Adolphe Gagnon, Liberal (1871–1875)
- Onésime Gauthier, Conservative (1875–1886)
- Joseph Morin, Liberal (1886–1897)
- Pierre D'Auteuil, Conservative (1897–1900)
- Joseph Morin, Liberal (1900–1904)
- Pierre D'Auteuil, Conservative (1904–1912)
- did not exist (1912–1948), see Charlevoix—Saguenay
- Arthur Leclerc, Union Nationale (1948–1962)
- Raymond Mailloux, Liberal (1962–1985)
- Daniel Bradet, Liberal (1985–1994)
- Rosaire Bertrand, Parti Québécois (1994–2007)
- Pauline Marois, Parti Québécois (2007–2012)

== Election results ==
2008 Quebec general election
| Party | Candidate | Votes | % | ±% |
|---|---|---|---|---|
| Parti Québécois | Pauline Marois | 10,510 | 52.21 | -6.99 |
| Liberal | Jean Luc Simard | 6,241 | 31.01 | - |
| Action démocratique | Mark Cardwell | 2,560 | 12.72 | -24.28 |
| Québec solidaire | André Jacob | 343 | 1.70 | - |
| Green | David Turcotte | 325 | 1.61 | -0.48 |
| No designation | Jean-Michel Harvey | 150 | 0.75 | - |

Charlevoix by-election, September 24, 2007
| Party | Candidate | Votes | % | ±% |
|---|---|---|---|---|
| Parti Québécois | Pauline Marois | 11,400 | 59.20 | +21.53 |
| Action démocratique | Conrad Harvey | 7,125 | 37.00 | +6.22 |
| Green | David Turcotte | 403 | 2.09 | -0.20 |
| Christian Democracy | Paul Biron | 135 | 0.70 | - |
| Independent | Claude Gagnon | 77 | 0.40 | - |
| Independent | Daniel Laforest | 64 | 0.33 | - |
| Republic of Quebec | François Robert Lemire | 52 | 0.27 | - |

2007 Quebec general election
| Party | Candidate | Votes | % | ±% |
|---|---|---|---|---|
| Parti Québécois | Rosaire Bertrand | 9,099 | 37.67 | -5.96 |
| Action démocratique | Conrad Harvey | 7,436 | 30.78 | +13.56 |
| Liberal | Jean-Guy Bouchard | 6,541 | 27.08 | -10.63 |
| Green | David Turcotte | 553 | 2.29 | - |
| Québec solidaire | Lucie Charbonneau | 527 | 2.18 | +1.46* |

* Increase is from UFP

2003 Quebec general election
| Party | Candidate | Votes | % | ±% |
|---|---|---|---|---|
| Parti Québécois | Rosaire Bertrand | 10,131 | 43.63 | -12.97 |
| Liberal | Denis Lavoie | 8,758 | 37.71 | +3.19 |
| Action démocratique | Daniel Bouchard | 3,998 | 17.22 | +9.75 |
| UFP | Éric Tremblay | 168 | 0.72 | - |
| Independent | Gabriel Tremblay | 105 | 0.45 | -0.21 |
| Christian Democracy | Philippe Thivierge | 62 | 0.27 | - |

1998 Quebec general election
| Party | Candidate | Votes | % | ±% |
|---|---|---|---|---|
| Parti Québécois | Rosaire Bertrand | 13,648 | 56.60 | +4.01 |
| Liberal | Claire Gagnon | 8,322 | 34.52 | -4.56 |
| Action démocratique | Kevin Tremblay | 1,800 | 7.47 | - |
| Socialist Democracy | Guillaume Tremblay | 183 | 0.76 | - |
| Independent | Gabriel Tremblay | 158 | 0.66 | - |

1995 Quebec referendum
| Side | Votes | % |
|---|---|---|
| Oui | 15,702 | 56.64 |
| Non | 12,019 | 43.36 |

1994 Quebec general election
| Party | Candidate | Votes | % | ±% |
|---|---|---|---|---|
| Parti Québécois | Rosaire Bertrand | 12,091 | 52.59 | +6.72 |
| Liberal | Daniel Bradet | 8,986 | 39.08 | -15.05 |
| Independent | Guy Fontaine | 1,915 | 8.33 | - |

1992 Charlottetown Accord referendum
| Side | Votes | % |
|---|---|---|
| Non | 14,407 | 61.95 |
| Oui | 8,849 | 38.05 |

1989 Quebec general election
| Party | Candidate | Votes | % | ±% |
|---|---|---|---|---|
| Liberal | Daniel Bradet | 11,816 | 54.13 | -7.00 |
| Parti Québécois | Rosaire Bertrand | 10,012 | 45.87 | +9.61 |

1985 Quebec general election
| Party | Candidate | Votes | % | ±% |
|---|---|---|---|---|
| Liberal | Daniel Bradet | 14,847 | 61.13 | +10.48 |
| Parti Québécois | Paul-Henri Jean | 8,808 | 36.26 | -11.21 |
| New Democrat | Robert Vigneault | 634 | 2.61 | - |

1981 Quebec general election
| Party | Candidate | Votes | % | ±% |
|---|---|---|---|---|
| Liberal | Raymond Mailloux | 12,712 | 50.65 | -3.93 |
| Parti Québécois | Paul-Henri Jean | 11,913 | 47.47 | +14.42 |
| Union Nationale | Jeannot Lavoie | 473 | 1.88 | -5.46 |

1980 Quebec referendum
| Side | Votes | % |
|---|---|---|
| Non | 13,906 | 57.58 |
| Oui | 10,244 | 42.42 |

1976 Quebec general election
| Party | Candidate | Votes | % | ±% |
|---|---|---|---|---|
| Liberal | Raymond Mailloux | 12,419 | 54.58 | -9.33 |
| Parti Québécois | Gérard Drouin | 7,520 | 33.05 | +15.76 |
| Union Nationale | Gaston Dion | 1,670 | 7.34 | +3.79 |
| Ralliement créditiste | Angelo Emond | 1,146 | 5.03 | -10.22 |

== See also ==
- List of Quebec provincial electoral districts
- Canadian provincial electoral districts
