= Joseph Morin (Charlevoix MLA) =

Canadian politician

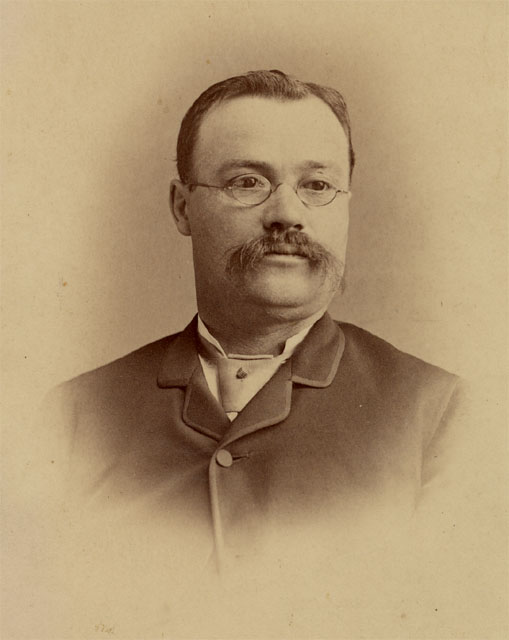
Joseph Morin, c. 1900

Joseph Morin (February 13, 1854 – June 1, 1915) was a merchant, farmer and political figure in Quebec. He represented Charlevoix in the Legislative Assembly of Quebec from 1886 to 1897 and from 1900 to 1904 as a Liberal.

He was born in Baie-Saint-Paul, Canada East, the son of Toussaint Morin and Calixte Vandal, and was educated at the Académie de Baie-Saint-Paul. He was a representative for Matthew Moddy & Son and for the Canada Life Company. In 1878, he married Georgianne Simard. Morin was secretary-treasurer for the municipality of Baie-Saint-Paul in 1879 and for the local school board from 1879 to 1903. He also served on the village council for Baie-Saint-Paul. Morin was defeated by Pierre D'Auteuil when he ran for reelection in 1897. He was governor for the prison at Quebec City from 1906 until his death in Quebec City at the age of 61. He was buried at Baie-Saint-Paul.
