= Raymond Mailloux =

Canadian politician (1918–1995)

Raymond Mailloux (May 1, 1918 – July 26, 1995) was a Quebec politician and Cabinet Minister. A member of the Quebec Liberal Party, he was the Member of National Assembly of Quebec (Legislative Assembly of Quebec from 1962 to 1968) for the Charlevoix riding from 1962 to 1985.

Born in Baie-Saint-Paul, Quebec, Mailloux worked as a ship captain from the end of his studies at the Quebec Marine Institute (in French) until 1943. He was a manager and worked an insurance company. He was also a member of the Charlevoix Chamber of Commerce in the late 1950s and early 1960s.

Prior to his entry at the National Assembly of Quebec, he also served as a municipal councillor in Baie-Saint-Paul.

He was first elected as MLA in Charlevoix in the 1962 elections and re-elected for five other terms until the 1985 elections. He served as the Minister for Roads (1970–1972), Minister of Public Works (1970–1972 and 1973–1975) and Procurement (1973–1975) and Minister of Transports (1973–1976) in the government of Robert Bourassa.
