= Léon-Charles Clément =

Canadian politician

Member of the Legislative Assembly of Quebec for Charlevoix
- In office 1867–1871
- Succeeded by: Adolphe Gagnon

Personal details
- Born: February 12, 1814 Saint-Louis-de-Terrebonne, Lower Canada
- Died: August 27, 1882 (aged 68) Les Éboulements, Quebec
- Party: Conservative

Léon-Charles Clément (February 12, 1814 – August 27, 1882) was a notary, land owner and political figure in Quebec. He represented Charlevoix in the Legislative Assembly of Quebec from 1867 to 1871 as a Conservative.

He was born in Saint-Louis-de-Terrebonne, Lower Canada, the son of Léon Clément and Élisabeth Frambs. Clément qualified as a notary in 1839 and set up practice in Les Éboulements. In 1843, he married Joséphine-Éléonore d'Estimauville, the widow of Louis-Paschal-Achille Taché. He served as lieutenant-colonel in the militia. Clément served as mayor for Les Éboulements from 1859 to 1873, when he resigned after being named an immigration and colonization agent for the province, and then again from 1878 to 1881. He was an unsuccessful candidate for Charlevoix in the legislative assembly for the Province of Canada in 1857 and 1861. He was defeated when he ran for reelection in 1871. Clément died at Les Éboulements at the age of 68.
