= Rosaire Bertrand =

Canadian politician and insurance broker

MNA for Charlevoix
- In office September 12, 1994 – August 13, 2007
- Preceded by: Daniel Bradet
- Succeeded by: Pauline Marois

Personal details
- Born: October 25, 1936 (age 89) Saint-Fabien-de-Panet, Quebec
- Party: Parti Québécois
- Profession: Insurance broker

Rosaire Bertrand (born October 25, 1936, in Saint-Fabien-de-Panet, Quebec) is an insurance broker and a former Quebec politician. He was the Member of National Assembly of Quebec for the provincial riding of Charlevoix as a member of the Parti Québécois from 1994 to 2007.

Bertrand worked for 33 years in the insurance business as a chartered life underwriter, a certified insurance and a life insurance broker and was the president of two insurance firms from 1976 to 1997. He was also an administration member of the Junior Chambers of French Canada, the Canadian Life Insurance Association, the Association of Quebec City Life underwriters, the Provincial Association of Quebec Life Underwriters and the Insurance Brokers Association of Quebec. He was also an active member of the Parti Québécois, being the president of the party in the Capitale-Nationale region.

Bertrand entered politics in 1994 and was elected for the first of four mandates in Charlevoix. During his first mandate he was the Chair of the Government Caucus from 1994 to 1996. After being re-elected in 1998, he was the Delegate Minister responsible for the Capitale-Nationale region from 2001 to 2003. Bertrand was later re-elected in 2003 and 2007. During his third mandate, he was the critic in financial institutions.

On August 13, 2007, Bertrand announced his retirement as MNA for Charlevoix, making way for PQ leader Pauline Marois to be the candidate in a by-election.
