= Onésime Gauthier =

Canadian politician

Onésime Gauthier (December 2, 1834 – June 16, 1886) was a farmer and political figure in Quebec. He represented Charlevoix as a Conservative member from 1875 to 1886.

He was born in Saint-Urbain, Charlevoix County, Lower Canada, the son of Michel Gauthier-Larouche and Marie Tremblay, and was educated there. In 1871, he married Mélanie Simard. Gauthier was also an educator, a colonization director and agent for the Canadian Titanic Iron Company Ltd. He served as mayor of Saint-Urbain for several years. Gauthier died in office at Quebec City at the age of 51.
