= Saint-Urbain, Quebec =

Saint-Urbain
- Parish municipality
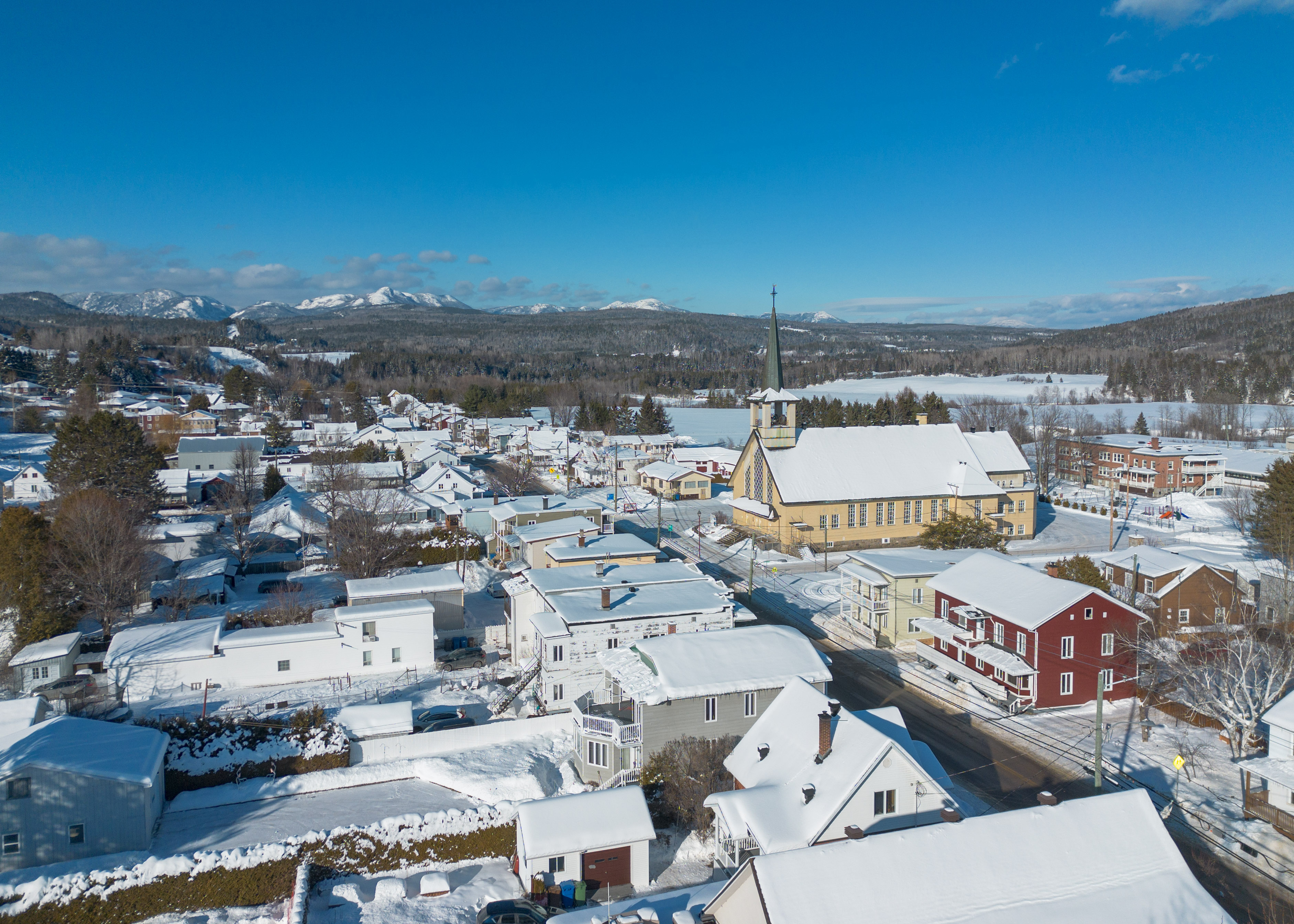
- Saint-Urbain in 2026

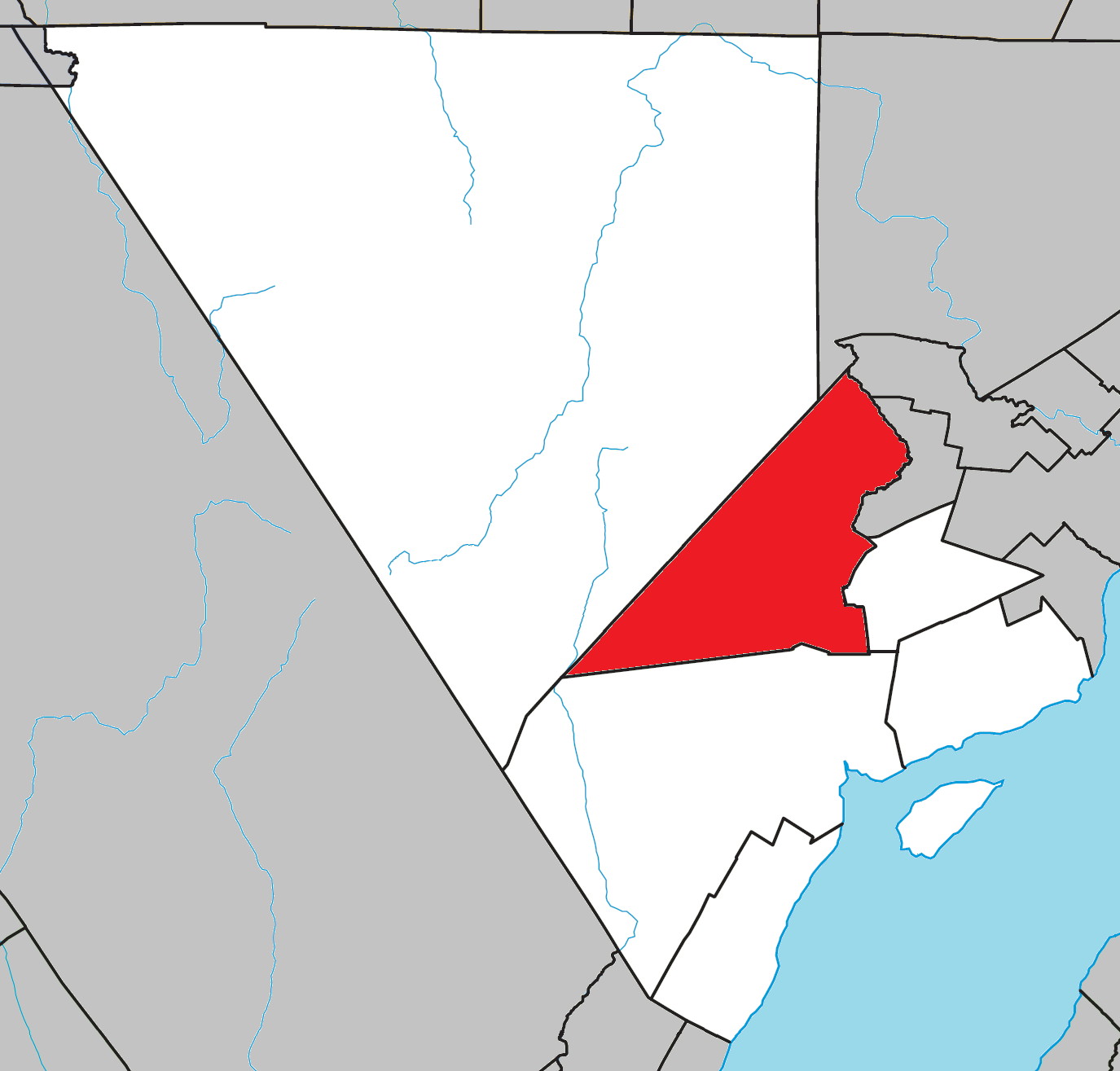
- Location within Charlevoix RCM

- Location in central Quebec
- Coordinates: 47°33′N 70°32′W
- Country: Canada
- Province: Quebec
- Region: Capitale-Nationale
- RCM: Charlevoix
- Constituted: July 1, 1855

Government
  - Mayor: Claudette Simard
  - Federal riding: Montmorency—Charlevoix
  - Prov. riding: Charlevoix–Côte-de-Beaupré

Area
  - Total: 333.39 km^{2} (128.72 sq mi)
  - Land: 330.57 km^{2} (127.63 sq mi)

Population (2021)
  - Total: 1,320
  - Density: 4/km^{2} (10/sq mi)
  - Pop (2016-21): ▼3.9%
  - Dwellings: 657
- Time zone: UTC−5 (EST)
  - Summer (DST): UTC−4 (EDT)
- Postal code(s): G0A 4K0
- Area codes: 418 and 581
- Highways: R-138 R-381
- Website: www.sainturbain.qc.ca/fr/

Saint-Urbain (French pronunciation: [sɛ̃t‿yʁbɛ̃]) is a parish municipality located in the Charlevoix Regional County Municipality, in Capitale-Nationale region, Quebec, Canada.

The municipality lies along Route 381 at the intersection with Route 138.

== History ==
In the late 18th century, the Séminaire de Québec encouraged settlers to settle in the highlands of the area. Although the name Saint-Urbain was already in use since 1815, the parish was not canonically erected until 1827 and civilly in 1835. The parish, also called Saint-Urbain-de-Beaupré, was named in honour of Urbain Boiret (1731–1774), superior of the seminary in 1762. By 1830, the place has about 300 people in 50 families.

In 1845, the Municipality of St. Urbain was created, but dissolved two years later. On July 1, 1855, it was reestablished as a parish municipality. In 1872, the Saint-Urbain Post Office opened (renamed to Saint-Urbain-de-Charlevoix in 1876).

Saint-Urbain was one of the localities affected by the 1870 Charlevoix earthquake and 1925 Charlevoix–Kamouraska earthquake.

On June 13, 1952, a fire destroyed 52 homes and businesses, or more than two-thirds of the village of Saint-Urbain, leaving more than 350 people homeless.

== Geography ==
The town is situated in the rugged landscape of the Laurentian Mountains, in the valley of the Gouffre River surrounded by high peaks. Other rivers that flow through the municipality included:

- Rivière du Gouffre Sud-Ouest
- Le Petit Bras (Le Gros Bras tributary)
- Rivière des Monts
- Le Gros Bras
- Remy River

== Demographics ==
In the 2021 Census of Population conducted by Statistics Canada, Saint-Urbain had a population of 1,320 living in 585 of its 657 total private dwellings, a change of −3.9% from its 2016 population of 1,373. With a land area of 330.57 km^{2} (127.63 sq mi), it had a population density of 4.0/km^{2} (10.3/sq mi) in 2021.

Historical census populations – Saint-Urbain, Quebec

Year	Pop.	±%
1861	761	—
1871	855	+12.4%
1881	1,057	+23.6%
1891	1,141	+7.9%
1901	1,221	+7.0%
1911	1,228	+0.6%
1921	1,062	−13.5%
1931	1,211	+14.0%

Year	Pop.	±%
1941	1,476	+21.9%
1951	1,681	+13.9%
1956	1,742	+3.6%
1961	1,707	−2.0%
1966	1,800	+5.4%
1971	1,756	−2.4%
1976	1,741	−0.9%
1981	1,765	+1.4%

Year	Pop.	±%
1986	1,656	−6.2%
1991	1,599	−3.4%
1996	1,528	−4.4%
2001	1,430	−6.4%
2006	1,448	+1.3%
2011	1,474	+1.8%
2016	1,373	−6.9%
2021	1,320	−3.9%

Source: Statistics Canada

Mother tongue (2021):

- English as first language: 0.8%
- French as first language: 98.9%
- English and French as first language: 0%
- Other as first language: 0.4%

== Education ==
Centre de services scolaires de Charlevoix operates francophone public schools:

- École Valléemont

The Central Quebec School Board operates anglophone public schools serving the community at the secondary level, including:

- St. Patrick's High School in Quebec City

== Media ==
Television :

- CIMT-DT
- CKRT-DT
- TVCO

== Notable people ==
- Onésime Gauthier (1834-1886), a Canadian politician
- Joseph-Arsène Bonnier (1879–1962), a Canadian politician
- Alice Vinette / Sister Marie-Jocelyne (1894-1989), composer

== See also ==
- List of municipalities in Quebec
