= Joseph-André-Mathurin Jacrau =

Canadian priest

Joseph-André-Mathurin Jacrau (1698 - July 23, 1772) was a Canadian priest.

Born in the diocese of Angers, in France, Jacrau arrived in Canada some time before 1725.
