= Edmond Langevin =

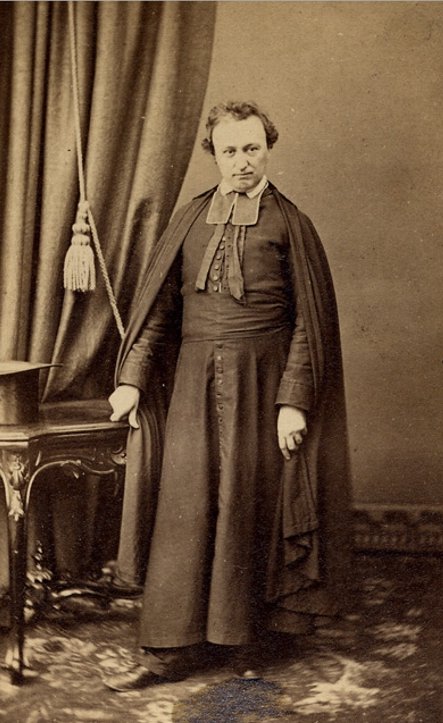
- Born: 30 August 1824; Quebec City, Lower Canada
- Died: 2 June 1889 (aged 64); Rimouski, Quebec
- Known for: priest and vicar general
- Relatives: Jean Langevin, brother Hector-Louis Langevin, brother

Edmond Langevin (30 August 1824 – 2 June 1889) was a Canadian Roman Catholic priest and vicar general.

Born in Quebec City, Lower Canada, Langevin studied at the Petit Séminaire de Québec and the Grand Séminaire. He was ordained priest in 1847. He was appointed vicar general by Charles-François Baillargeon in 1867.
