= Le Gros Bras =

Location
- Country: Canada
- Province: Quebec
- Region: Capitale-Nationale
- Regional County Municipality: Charlevoix Regional County Municipality
- Unorganized territory and municipality: Lac-Pikauba and Saint-Urbain

Physical characteristics
- Source: Confluence of forest streams
  - location: Lac-Pikauba
  - coordinates: 47.69737°N 70.65298°W
  - elevation: 710 m (2,330 ft)
- Mouth: Rivière du Gouffre
  - location: Saint-Urbain
  - coordinates: 47.57167°N 70.44194°W
  - elevation: 60 m (200 ft)
- Length: 22.4 km (13.9 mi)

Basin features
- Tributaries
  - left: (upstream from the mouth) Unidentified stream, discharge from two small lakes, discharge from a small lake, two streams, discharge from an unidentified lake, discharge from Lac Le Gros Brook, unidentified stream.
  - right: (upstream from the mouth) Unidentified stream, Le Petit Bras (Le Gros Bras), discharge from a small lake, Parent stream, Rivière des Monts, Le Gros Ruisseau, discharge from a small lake, unidentified stream.

Le Gros Bras (English: The Big Arm) is a tributary of the eastern bank of the lower part of the rivière du Gouffre, flowing through the unorganized territory of Lac-Pikauba and the municipality of Saint-Urbain, in the Charlevoix Regional County Municipality, the administrative region of Capitale-Nationale, the province of Quebec, Canada. The upper part of this watercourse begins in Grands-Jardins National Park.

This valley is mainly served by the route 138 whose segment near the Saint-Laurent river is designated boulevard Monseigneur de Laval; then consecutively going up north rue Saint-Édouard in Saint-Urbain, chemin Saint-François entering the forest zone, then "chemin du Parc-des-Grands-Jardins" further north. Forestry is the main economic activity in this valley; recreational tourism, second.

The surface of Le Gros Bras is generally frozen from the beginning of December until the beginning of April; however, safe circulation on the ice is generally done from mid-December to the end of March. The water level of the river varies with the seasons and the precipitation; the spring flood generally occurs in April.

== Geography ==
The Gros Bras rises at the confluence of two forest streams (altitude: 710 metres (2,330 ft)) located in the forest zone and encased between Mont Jean-Palardy (located 0.5 km from the west side, altitude: 956 metres (3,136 ft)) and another mountain (located 1.2 km from the northeast side, altitude: 992 metres (3,255 ft)). This source of the river is located at:

- 10.9 kilometres (6.8 mi) east of a curve of the course of the upper part of the Malbaie River;
- 17.8 kilometres (11.1 mi) north-west of the village center of Saint-Urbain;
- 16.5 kilometres (10.3 mi) north-west of the mouth of the Gros Bras (confluence with the Gouffre river);
- 30.5 kilometres (19.0 mi) north-west of Baie-Saint-Paul town center.

From its source, the course of Le Gros Bras descends on 22.4 kilometres (13.9 mi) in a generally deep valley, with a drop of 518 metres (1,699 ft), according to the following segments:

- 3.0 kilometres (1.9 mi) towards the south-east in a deep valley by collecting the discharge (coming from the south-west) of a small lake, until the discharge (coming from the north-east) of the Lake du Gros Ruisseau;
- 5.1 kilometres (3.2 mi) towards the south-east in a deep valley, by collecting the discharge (coming from the north-east) of Lake Georges, then by forming a small loop towards the south-west, that is to say on the side north of a campsite in the park, and leaving Grands-Jardins National Park at the end of the segment and passing in front of the hamlet "Le Pied-des-Monts", up to a stream (coming from the north -Where is). Note: this confluence is very close to the eastern limit of the Laurentides Wildlife Reserve;
- 4.8 kilometres (3.0 mi) towards the south-east in Saint-Urbain by collecting the discharge (coming from the west) of a small lake and by forming a loop towards the south-west where an exploitation is located mining, to the confluence of the Rivière des Monts (coming from the west);
- 2.0 kilometres (1.2 mi) to the southeast by forming a small loop to the northeast, to Parent stream (coming from the west);
- 5.6 kilometres (3.5 mi) towards the south-east by forming some isolated serpentines, in a deep valley, and by collecting the discharge (coming from the west) of a small lake, until the confluence of the Le Petit Bras (coming from the southwest);
- 1.9 kilometres (1.2 mi) towards the south-east by crossing the route 381 and forming a loop towards the south, until its mouth.

The Gros Bras flows downstream from a river loop on the west bank of the Rivière du Gouffre, in the municipality of Saint-Urbain. This mouth is located at:

- 2.5 kilometres (1.6 mi) upstream of the road bridge in the village of Saint-Urbain;
- 1.6 kilometres (0.99 mi) north-west of the village center of Saint-Urbain;
- 7.5 kilometres (4.7 mi) south-west of the village center of Saint-Hilarion;
- 14.6 kilometres (9.1 mi) north-west of Baie-Saint-Paul town center;
- 30.6 kilometres (19.0 mi) south-west of La Malbaie town center.

From the mouth of Le Gros Bras, the current descends on 25.3 kilometres (15.7 mi) with a drop of 56 metres (184 ft) following the course of the Rivière du Gouffre which flows into Baie-Saint-Paul in the St. Lawrence River.

== Toponymy ==
This toponymic designation appeared for the first time on a map in 1870. This designation is always used by local informants. The name appears on the draft of the Saint-Urbain map, 1958-12-17, item 170. The toponymic variants are: Bras Nord-Ouest, Rivière à Yves and Rivière du Gros Bras.

The toponym "Le Gros Bras" was formalized on December 5, 1968 at the Place Names Bank of the Commission de toponymie du Québec.

== Appendices ==
=== Related articles ===
- Charlevoix Regional County Municipality
- Lac-Pikauba, an unorganized territory
- Saint-Urbain, a municipality
- Grands-Jardins National Park
- Bras Nord de la Rivière des Monts
- Rivière des Monts
- Le Petit Bras (Le Gros Bras)
- Rivière du Gouffre
- St. Lawrence River
- List of rivers of Quebec
