= Le Petit Bras (Le Gros Bras tributary) =

Location
- Country: Canada
- Province: Quebec
- Region: Capitale-Nationale
- Regional County Municipality: Charlevoix Regional County Municipality
- Unorganized territory and municipality: Saint-Urbain

Physical characteristics
- Source: Lac du Bras
  - location: Saint-Urbain
  - coordinates: 47.52945°N 70.70526°W
  - elevation: 805 m (2,641 ft)
- Mouth: Le Gros Bras
  - location: Saint-Urbain
  - coordinates: 47.57167°N 70.55055°W
  - elevation: 80 m (260 ft)
- Length: 18.1 km (11.2 mi)

Basin features
- Tributaries
  - left: (upstream from the mouth) Discharge from a small lake, unidentified stream, stream at Pois, discharge from Lake Simard, stream from Monts, stream Gagnon, discharge from a group of small lakes.
  - right: (upstream from the mouth) Discharge from a small lake, discharge from a small lake, two streams, discharge from two small lakes, stream, discharge from two small lakes, stream.

Le Petit Bras is a tributary of the southwest bank of the lower part of the watercourse Le Gros Bras, flowing in the municipality of Saint-Urbain, in the Charlevoix Regional County Municipality, in the administrative region of Capitale-Nationale, in the province of Quebec, in Canada.

The lower part of this valley is mainly served by Chemin des Pointes and by Chemin du rang Saint-François which becomes Rue Saint-Édouard in the village of Saint-Urbain. The rest of the valley is served by a few forest roads. Forestry is the main economic activity in this valley; recreational tourism, second.

The surface of the lower part of Le Petit Bras is generally frozen from the beginning of December until the beginning of April; however, safe circulation on the ice is generally done from mid-December to the end of March. The upper part of this stream has a freezing period of about an additional week. The water level of the river varies with the seasons and the precipitation; the spring flood generally occurs in April.

== Geography ==
The Petit Bras rises at the mouth of Lac du Bras (length: 0.6 kilometres (0.37 mi); altitude: 805 metres (2,641 ft)) which is surrounded by mountains. This source of the river is located at:

- 7.0 kilometres (4.3 mi) east of the course of the upper part of the Sainte-Anne River (Les Chenaux);
- 12.9 kilometres (8.0 mi) south-west of the village center of Saint-Urbain;
- 12.8 kilometres (8.0 mi) south-west of the mouth of Le Petit Bras (confluence with Le Gros Bras);
- 17.9 kilometres (11.1 mi) west of downtown Baie-Saint-Paul.

From its source, the course of Le Petit Bras descends on 18.1 kilometres (11.2 mi) in a generally deep valley, with a drop of 727 metres (2,385 ft), according to the following segments:

- 1.9 kilometres (1.2 mi) towards the north-east in an increasingly deep valley, up to the outlet of Lac du Cran (coming from the north-west);
- 4.3 kilometres (2.7 mi) first towards the northeast in a deep valley by collecting a stream (coming from the south) and another stream (coming from the northwest), up to the stream at Pois ( coming from the west);
- 2.5 kilometres (1.6 mi) towards the east by collecting a stream (coming from the south), then forming a hook of 0.5 kilometres (0.31 mi) towards the north, then towards the east until to a stream (coming from the south);
- 1.9 kilometres (1.2 mi) towards the northwest by crossing a long series of rapids and by forming a hook towards the west, up to the brook of the Mountains (coming from the west);
- 2.2 kilometres (1.4 mi) north-east first by crossing a series of rapids, up to Gagnon stream (coming from the west);
- 1.5 kilometres (0.93 mi) towards the east crossing a long series of rapids and forming a hook towards the north, until the discharge (coming from the north) of small lakes;
- 3.8 kilometres (2.4 mi) to the east by crossing a series of rapids, then forming a few loops to the south and forking north at the end of the segment, to its mouth.

Le Petit Bras flows onto the southwest bank of Le Gros Bras, in the municipality of Saint-Urbain. This mouth is located at:

- 0.1 kilometres (0.062 mi) upstream from the route 381 bridge;
- 2.5 kilometres (1.6 mi) north-west of the village center of Saint-Urbain;
- 8.7 kilometres (5.4 mi) west of the village center of Saint-Hilarion;
- 15.7 kilometres (9.8 mi) north-west of Baie-Saint-Paul town center;
- 31.3 kilometres (19.4 mi) south-west of La Malbaie town center.

From the mouth of Le Petit Bras, the current descends on 1.9 kilometres (1.2 mi) following the course of Le Gros Bras towards the south-east; then on 25.3 kilometres (15.7 mi) with a drop of 56 metres (184 ft) following the course of the rivière du Gouffre which flows into Baie-Saint-Paul in the St. Lawrence River.

== Toponymy ==
The toponymic designation "Branche Sud du Gros Bras" appears in the 1969 Toponymic Directory as the official form. Considering that the name "Le Petit Bras" was used by residents of the area, the Commission de toponymie du Québec formalized the name change in July 1976. Note: A stream officially named on the sheet 21M / 07, located eight kilometers to the southeast. Toponymic variants: Rivière des Pointes, South Branch of the North-West Arm and South Branch of the Gros Bras.

The toponym "Le Petit Bras" was formalized on September 22, 1976 at the Place Names Bank of the Commission de toponymie du Québec.

== Appendices ==
=== Related articles ===
- Charlevoix Regional County Municipality
- Saint-Urbain, a municipality
- Le Gros Bras (Gouffre River tributary)
- Rivière du Gouffre
- St. Lawrence River
- List of rivers of Quebec
