= Jean D'Amour =

Canadian politician

Member of the National Assembly of Quebec for Rivière-du-Loup-Témiscouata Rivière-du-Loup (2009–2012)
- In office 22 June 2009 – 29 August 2018
- Preceded by: Mario Dumont
- Succeeded by: Denis Tardif

Personal details
- Born: 9 September 1963 (age 62) Rivière-du-Loup, Quebec
- Party: Liberal
- Spouse: Maryse Bourgoin

Jean D'Amour (born 9 September 1963) is a Canadian politician, who represented the electoral district of Rivière-du-Loup-Témiscouata in the National Assembly of Quebec. He won the riding in a by-election on 22 June 2009, and previously served as mayor of Rivière-du-Loup from 1999 to 2007.

He was previously president of the Quebec Liberal Party, and was also the party's candidate in Rivière-du-Loup for the 1994 and 2007 provincial elections.

He faced some controversy during the campaign, as he was arrested for impaired driving on 24 September 2008, and pleaded guilty on 19 December. His driver's license was suspended for one year. He has also faced allegations that he violated provincial ethics laws by lobbying the municipal government of Rivière-du-Loup less than two years after leaving office. Premier Jean Charest stood behind D'Amour, however, crediting him with being honest and forthcoming with the voters about his mistakes.

D'Amour defeated the Parti Québécois candidate, former federal Member of Parliament Paul Crête, in the by-election. Crête had been considered the likely winner at the start of the by-election campaign, but was hurt by PQ leader Pauline Marois' public statements that she planned to create a favourable climate for Quebec sovereignty by intentionally seeking to inflame political tensions between Quebec and English Canada.

He resigned the Liberal caucus to sit as an independent on 10 November 2009, following revelations that he was under investigation for allegedly accepting an envelope of money from a developer on behalf of Michel Morin, his successor as mayor of Rivière-du-Loup. An investigation by the province's chief electoral officer cleared him of wrongdoing, and he was subsequently readmitted to the Liberal caucus on 24 December.

== Electoral record ==
1994 Quebec general election: Rivière-du-Loup
Party	Candidate	Votes	%	±%
Action démocratique	Mario Dumont	13,307	54.77	–
Parti Québécois	Harold LeBel	6,608	27.20	-14.85
Liberal	Jean D'Amour	4,226	17.39	-37.09
Independent	L. Richard Cimon	99	0.41	–
Natural Law	Armand Pouliot	55	0.23	–

2007 Quebec general election: Rivière-du-Loup
Party	Candidate	Votes	%	±%
Action démocratique	Mario Dumont	15,276	58.47	+1.24
Liberal	Jean D'Amour	7,390	28.29	+4.53
Parti Québécois	Hugues Belzile	2,821	10.80	-6.88
Green	Martin Poirier	639	2.45	+1.12
Total valid votes		26,126	99.20	–
Total rejected ballots		210	0.80	–
Turnout		26,336	78.27	+5.61
Electors on the lists		33,648	–	–

Quebec provincial by-election, June 22, 2009: Rivière-du-Loup
Party	Candidate	Votes	%	±%
Liberal	Jean D'Amour	9,959	47.49	+20.50
Parti Québécois	Paul Crête	7,514	35.83	+21.63
Action démocratique	Gilberte Côté	3,089	14.73	−37.04
Green	Martin Poirier	151	0.72	−1.67
Independent	Victor-Lévy Beaulieu	93	0.44	−2.34
Québec solidaire	Benoît Renaud	89	0.42	−1.44
Finance Reform	Denis Couture	40	0.19	–
Parti indépendantiste	Éric Tremblay	37	0.18	–
Total valid votes		20,972	99.44	
Total rejected ballots		119	0.56	
Turnout		21,091	61.64	−2.34
Electors on the lists		34,219		
Called upon the resignation of Mario Dumont.

2012 Quebec general election: Rivière-du-Loup–Témiscouata
Party	Candidate	Votes	%	±%
Liberal	Jean D'Amour	15,317	40.91	-4.12
Parti Québécois	Michel Lagacé	12,870	34.37	-2.03
Coalition Avenir Québec	Gaétan Lavoie	6,949	18.56	+2.59
Québec solidaire	Stacy Larouche	1,116	2.98	+1.93
Green	Nadia Pelletier	647	1.73	+0.74
Option nationale	Jonathan St-Pierre	410	1.09	–
Coalition pour la constituante	Sylvain Potvin	135	0.36	–
Total valid votes		37,444	98.86	–
Total rejected ballots		430	1.14	–
Turnout		37,874	74.56	
Electors on the lists		50,795	–	–
^ Change is from redistributed results. CAQ change is from ADQ.
Liberal hold		Swing		-1.04

2014 Quebec general election: Rivière-du-Loup–Témiscouata
Party	Candidate	Votes	%	±%
Liberal	Jean D'Amour	18,086	51.69	+10.78
Parti Québécois	Michel Lagacé	8,378	23.95	-10.42
Coalition Avenir Québec	Charles Roy	5,794	16.56	-2.00
Québec solidaire	Louis Gagnon	2,129	6.09	+3.11
Parti des sans Parti	Frank Malenfant	354	1.01	+0.65*
Option nationale	Étienne Massé	245	0.70	-0.39
Total valid votes		34,986	98.61	–
Total rejected ballots		494	1.39	–
Turnout		35,480	70.00	-4.56
Electors on the lists		50,688	–	–
* Result compared to Coalition pour la constituante

2018 Quebec general election: Rivière-du-Loup-Témiscouata
Party	Candidate	Votes	%	±%
Coalition Avenir Québec	Denis Tardif	13,439	39.18	+22.62
Liberal	Jean D'Amour	11,477	33.46	-18.23
Parti Québécois	Vincent Couture	5,230	15.25	-8.70
Québec solidaire	Goulimine Sylvie Cadôret	3,783	11.03	+4.94
Conservative	Martin Perron	373	1.09	–
Total valid votes		34,302	98.33	
Total rejected ballots		583	1.67	
Turnout		34,885	69.41	-0.59
Eligible voters		50,261		
Coalition Avenir Québec gain from Liberal		Swing		+20.43
Source(s) "Rapport des résultats officiels du scrutin". Élections Québec.
