= Rivière-du-Loup (electoral district) =

Former provincial electoral district in Quebec, Canada

Coordinates: 47.80°N 69.42°W

Quebec electoral district

Defunct provincial electoral district
- Legislature: National Assembly of Quebec
- District created: 1930
- District abolished: 1939
- District re-created: 1944
- District re-abolished: 2011
- First contested: 1931
- Last contested: 2009 (by-election)

Demographics
- Population (2006): 42,780
- Electors (2008): 33,981
- Area (km²): 2,481.21
- Census division(s): Les Basques (all), Rivière-du-Loup (all)
- Census subdivision(s): Cacouna, L'Isle-Verte, Notre-Dame-des-Neiges, Notre-Dame-des-Sept-Douleurs, Notre-Dame-du-Portage, Rivière-du-Loup, Saint-Antonin, Saint-Arsène, Saint-Clément, Saint-Cyprien, Saint-Éloi, Saint-Épiphane, Sainte-Françoise, Saint-François-Xavier-de-Viger, Saint-Guy, Saint-Hubert-de-Rivière-du-Loup, Saint-Jean-de-Dieu, Saint-Mathieu-de-Rioux, Saint-Médard, Saint-Modeste, Saint-Paul-de-la-Croix, Sainte-Rita, Saint-Simon, Trois-Pistoles; Cacouna (Indian reserve), Whitworth; Lac-Boisbouscache

Rivière-du-Loup (French pronunciation: [ʁivjɛʁ dy lu]) is a former provincial electoral district in the Bas-Saint-Laurent region of Quebec, Canada, which elected members to the National Assembly of Quebec.

It was created for the 1931 election from a portion of the electoral district of Témiscouata. It disappeared in the 1939 election and its successor electoral district was Kamouraska–Rivière-du-Loup; however, it was re-created for the 1944 election.

Its final general election was in 2008; there was a by-election in 2009. It disappeared in the 2012 election and the successor electoral district was Rivière-du-Loup–Témiscouata.

== Members of the Legislative Assembly / National Assembly ==
1. Léon Casgrain, Liberal (1931–1939)
2. did not exist (1939–1944), see Kamouraska–Rivière-du-Loup
3. Léon Casgrain, Liberal (1944–1948)
4. Roméo Gagné, Union Nationale (1948–1956)
5. Alphonse Couturier, Liberal (1956–1966)
6. Gérard Lebel, Union Nationale (1966–1970)
7. Paul Lafrance, Liberal (1970–1976)
8. Jules Boucher, Parti Québécois (1976–1985)
9. Albert Côté, Liberal (1985–1994)
10. Mario Dumont, Action démocratique (1994–2009)
11. Jean D'Amour, Liberal (2009, 2009–2012), Independent (2009)

== Linguistic demographics ==
- Francophone: 99.5%
- Anglophone: 0.4%
- Allophone: 0.2%

== Election results ==
Quebec provincial by-election, June 22, 2009
Party	Candidate	Votes	%	±%
Liberal	Jean D'Amour	9,959	47.49	+20.50
Parti Québécois	Paul Crête	7,514	35.83	+21.63
Action démocratique	Gilberte Côté	3,089	14.73	−37.04
Green	Martin Poirier	151	0.72	−1.67
Independent	Victor-Lévy Beaulieu	93	0.44	−2.34
Québec solidaire	Benoît Renaud	89	0.42	−1.44
Finance Reform	Denis Couture	40	0.19	–
Parti indépendantiste	Éric Tremblay	37	0.18	–
Total valid votes		20,972	99.44	
Total rejected ballots		119	0.56	
Turnout		21,091	61.64	−2.34
Electors on the lists		34,219		
Called upon the resignation of Mario Dumont.

2008 Quebec general election
Party	Candidate	Votes	%	±%
Action démocratique	Mario Dumont	11,115	51.77	-6.70
Liberal	Jean-Pierre Rioux	5,795	26.99	-1.29
Parti Québécois	Stephan Shields	3,048	14.20	+3.40
Independent	Victor-Lévy Beaulieu	597	2.78	–
Green	Alain Gagnon	513	2.39	-0.06
Québec solidaire	Stacy Larouche	400	1.86	–
Total valid votes		21,468	98.74	–
Total rejected ballots		273	1.26	–
Turnout		21,741	63.98	-14.29
Electors on the lists		33,981	–	–
Action démocratique hold		Swing		-2.70

2007 Quebec general election
Party	Candidate	Votes	%	±%
Action démocratique	Mario Dumont	15,276	58.47	+1.24
Liberal	Jean D'Amour	7,390	28.29	+4.53
Parti Québécois	Hugues Belzile	2,821	10.80	-6.88
Green	Martin Poirier	639	2.45	+1.12
Total valid votes		26,126	99.20	–
Total rejected ballots		210	0.80	–
Turnout		26,336	78.27	+5.61
Electors on the lists		33,648	–	–

2003 Quebec general election
Party	Candidate	Votes	%	±%
Action démocratique	Mario Dumont	13,452	57.23	+10.89
Liberal	Jacques Morin	5,585	23.76	-1.55
Parti Québécois	Carol Gilbert	4,155	17.68	-9.15
Green	Julie Morin	312	1.33	–

1998 Quebec general election
Party	Candidate	Votes	%	±%
Action démocratique	Mario Dumont	10,897	46.34	-8.43
Parti Québécois	Lise Chouinard	6,308	26.83	-0.37
Liberal	Jean Morin	5,952	25.31	+7.92
Bloc Pot	Léo Legault	197	0.84	–
Independent	Daniel Morin	98	0.42	–
Socialist Democracy	Louis Leroux	61	0.26	–
Action démocratique hold		Swing		-4.03

1995 Quebec referendum
Side	Votes	%
Yes	14,561	54.59
No	12,114	45.41

1994 Quebec general election
Party	Candidate	Votes	%	±%
Action démocratique	Mario Dumont	13,307	54.77	–
Parti Québécois	Harold LeBel	6,608	27.20	-14.85
Liberal	Jean D'Amour	4,226	17.39	-37.09
Independent	L. Richard Cimon	99	0.41	–
Natural Law	Armand Pouliot	55	0.23	–

1992 Charlottetown Accord referendum
Side	Votes	%
Non	13,657	62.28
Oui	8,272	37.72

1989 Quebec general election: Rivière-du-Loup
Party	Candidate	Votes	%	±%
Liberal	Albert Côté	11,317	54.48	+1.16
Parti Québécois	Harold LeBel	8,736	42.05	-0.77
Marxist–Leninist	Pierre-Paul Malenfant	720	3.47	–

1985 Quebec general election
Party	Candidate	Votes	%	±%
Liberal	Albert Côté	11,690	53.32	+13.60
Parti Québécois	Denise M. Levesque	9,386	42.82	-12.50
New Democratic	Marius Tremblay	711	3.24	–
Christian Socialist	Evelyne Sévigny	136	0.62	–

1981 Quebec general election
Party	Candidate	Votes	%	±%
Parti Québécois	Jules Boucher	12,871	55.32	+16.79
Liberal	Emilien Michaud	9,242	39.72	+8.98
Union Nationale	Régent Raymond	1,154	4.96	-16.44

1980 Quebec referendum
Side	Votes	%
No	14,452	56.64
Yes	11,065	43.36

1976 Quebec general election
Party	Candidate	Votes	%	±%
Parti Québécois	Jules Boucher	9,415	38.53	+20.96
Liberal	Paul Lafrance	7,511	30.74	-19.67
Union Nationale	Réal Grondin	5,230	21.40	+11.49
Ralliement créditiste	Gérard Roy	2,281	9.33	-12.78

1973 Quebec general election
Party	Candidate	Votes	%	±%
Liberal	Paul Lafrance	10,827	50.41	+9.01
Parti créditiste	Gérard Roy	4,748	22.11	+9.77
Parti Québécois	Frank Lemieux	3,773	17.57	+7.89
Union Nationale	Réal Grondin	2,129	9.91	-26.67

1970 Quebec general election
Party	Candidate	Votes	%	±%
Liberal	Paul Lafrance	8,586	41.40	-6.42
Union Nationale	Gérard Lebel	7,585	36.58	-15.60
Ralliement créditiste	Robert Bergeron	2,558	12.34	–
Parti Québécois	Marius Milord	2,008	9.68	–

1966 Quebec general election
Party	Candidate	Votes	%	±%
Union Nationale	Gérard Lebel	9,691	52.18	+3.40
Liberal	Alphonse Courturier	8,880	47.82	-3.40

1962 Quebec general election
Party	Candidate	Votes	%	±%
Liberal	Alphonse Courturier	8,493	51.22	-0.49
Union Nationale	Gérard Lebel	8,090	48.78	+0.49

1960 Quebec general election
Party	Candidate	Votes	%	±%
Liberal	Alphonse Courturier	8,671	51.71	+0.47
Union Nationale	Maurice-Wilfrid Soucy	8,099	48.29	+0.35

1956 Quebec general election
Party	Candidate	Votes	%	±%
Liberal	Alphonse Courturier	8,623	51.24	+2.76
Union Nationale	Maurice-Wilfrid Soucy	8,067	47.94	-3.21
Independent U.N.	Pierre-Hervé Marquis	139	0.83	–

1952 Quebec general election
Party	Candidate	Votes	%	±%
Union Nationale	Roméo Gagné	8,689	51.15	-5.75
Liberal	Alphonse Courturier	8,236	48.48	+7.23
Independent U.N.	Jean-Baptiste Lavoie	62	0.36	–

1948 Quebec general election
Party	Candidate	Votes	%	±%
Union Nationale	Roméo Gagné	9,391	56.90	+12.96
Liberal	Léon Casgrain	6,809	41.25	-9.12
Union des électeurs	Marc Riou	305	1.85	–

1944 Quebec general election
Party	Candidate	Votes	%
Liberal	Léon Casgrain	7,061	50.37
Union Nationale	Roméo Gagné	6,160	43.94
Bloc populaire	Thomas Talbot	797	5.69

== See also ==
- List of Quebec provincial electoral districts
- Canadian provincial electoral districts
