= Jean Allaire =

Canadian politician (1930–2026)

Leader of the Action Démocratique du Québec
- In office 6 January 1994 – 28 April 1994
- Preceded by: Party established
- Succeeded by: Mario Dumont

Personal details
- Born: 1930
- Died: 25 August 2026 (aged 96)
- Party: Coalition Avenir Québec (2012–2026)
- Other political affiliations: Liberal (1990–1994); Action démocratique du Québec (1994–2008)
- Education: University of Montreal
- Profession: Politician, lawyer

Jean Allaire (1930 – 25 August 2026) was a Canadian politician and lawyer from Laval, Quebec, who notably authored the Allaire Report in 1991. In January 1994, he became the first leader of the fiscally conservative and autonomist Action démocratique du Québec (ADQ), a provincial political party. Allaire resigned in April 1994 for health reasons and was succeeded by Mario Dumont.

Prior to co-founding the ADQ, Allaire was an influential member of the Quebec Liberal Party. He and Dumont organized a group of Liberal dissidents called the "Network of Liberals for the No", that campaigned against the Charlottetown Accord. This faction was disillusioned with the Liberals' stance on Canadian federalism and became the future base of the ADQ.

In April 2007, Allaire signed a manifesto that urged Quebec to choose an electoral system in which a significant number of seats would be determined by mixed member proportional representation instead of plurality. In 2012, he became a member of the Coalition Avenir Québec (CAQ) after the ADQ merged with the CAQ. In 2013, he caused controversy when he described Islam as "a religion of violence."

Allaire died on 25 August 2026, at the age of 96.

Political offices
New political party	Leader of the Action démocratique du Québec; 1994	Succeeded by Mario Dumont
