= Albert Côté =

Canadian forestry engineer (1927–2020)

Member of the National Assembly of Quebec for Rivière-du-Loup
- In office 2 December 1985 – 7 January 1994
- Preceded by: Jules Boucher
- Succeeded by: Mario Dumont

Minister Delegate of Forests
- In office 12 December 1985 – 30 January 1991
- Preceded by: Jean-Pierre Jolivet
- Succeeded by: position abolished

Minister of the Quebec Ministry of Forests, Wildlife and Parks
- In office 30 January 1991 – 11 January 1994
- Preceded by: position established
- Succeeded by: Christos Sirros

Personal details
- Born: 19 January 1927 Sherbrooke, Quebec, Canada
- Died: 18 April 2020 (aged 93) Quebec City, Quebec, Canada
- Party: PLQ

Albert Côté (19 January 1927 – 18 April 2020) was a Canadian forestry engineer and politician.

== Biography ==
Côté earned degrees in surveying and forest engineering from Université Laval. He began his career working for the Quebec Ministry of Agriculture, Fisheries and Food in 1952. He then worked for the Quebec Ministry of Energy and Natural Resources until 1965. In 1965, he began directing forestry operations at Manicouagan and Aux Outardes River Basin Forest Recovery Office, then became president. He held this position until the organization was replaced by the state-owned REXFOR company in 1964. He then became president and CEO of REXFOR in 1979.

He became an assistant deputy minister at the Quebec Ministry of Energy and Natural Resources in 1979, then President of Scierie des Outardes, a joint venture between REXFOR and Quebec & Ontario Paper Co., from 1980 to 1983. He returned to the private sector of forestry engineering from 1983 to 1985.

Côté was the Quebec Liberal Party's nominee for the Rivière-du-Loup District in the 1985 Quebec general election. He was elected with a majority of votes, allocating 2304. He became Minister Delegate of Forests. He was re-elected in the 1989 Quebec general election with a slightly larger majority and retained his ministerial post. He was promoted to Minister of Forests in 1991.

In 1986, Côté implemented a new set of forestry guidelines with the Forest Act. In January 1991, he defended his forestry protection strategy with the document Aménager pour mieux protéger les forêts. This strategy was heard by the Quebec Bureau of Public Hearings on the Environment that same year.

Côté retired from politics in January 1994, when Daniel Johnson Jr. replaced Robert Bourassa as Premier of Quebec and leader of the Quebec Liberal Party.

== Publications ==
- Revue forestière française (1979)
