= Jules Boucher =

Canadian politician

Jules Boucher was a Canadian politician and a two-term Member of the National Assembly of Quebec.

== Background ==
He was born on June 8, 1933, in Sayabec, Bas-Saint-Laurent. He became a social worker in Riviere-du-Loup.

== Political career ==
Boucher ran as a Parti Québécois candidate in the 1976 election against Liberal incumbent Paul Lafrance in the provincial district of Rivière-du-Loup and won. He was re-elected in the 1981 election.

He served as Deputy House Leader from 1983 to 1984 and as parliamentary assistant from 1984 to 1985.

During the Parti Québécois Crisis of 1984, Boucher crossed the floor. He sat as an Independent by January 28, 1985. He did not run for re-election in the 1985 election.

== Death ==
Boucher died on December 31, 1999.

== Footnotes ==
National Assembly of Quebec
Preceded by Paul Lafrance (Liberal)	MNA for Rivière-du-Loup; 1976–1985	Succeeded by Albert Côté (Liberal)
