= Allaire Report =

1991 document proposing changes to the Canadian constitution

The Allaire Report was a report written by the constitutional reform committee of the Liberal Party of Quebec, chaired by lawyer and politician Jean Allaire, recommending a significant transfer of powers from Canada's federal government to the Government of Quebec. Entitled "A Quebec Free to Choose", the report was published on January 29, 1991, and adopted as party policy by the Liberal Party at their 25th convention on March 9, 1991.

== Report recommendations ==
The report recommended that the Canadian constitution be amended so that 22 areas of federal jurisdiction or jurisdictions shared between the federal and provincial governments become exclusive areas of provincial jurisdiction. These areas included social affairs, culture, health, family policy, manpower training, communications, the environment, agriculture and public security. The report recommended that the federal government no longer be allowed to spend money in these 22 areas. Because of Quebec's new proposed responsibilities, taxing powers would need to be adjusted so that the federal government collect less and the Quebec government collect more, according to the report.

As a result of its proposed changes, few areas would remain the exclusive jurisdiction of the federal government, including defence, tariffs, post, currency, equalization payments and the federal debt.

The report also made other recommendations on constitutional changes, including abolition of the Senate of Canada. The Liberal Party convention amended this proposal to call for reform of the Senate instead. The convention also approved some constitutional positions not included in the report, such as support for the Canadian Charter of Rights and Freedoms, guaranteeing anglophone rights and recognizing aboriginals as "distinct nations".

== Political significance ==
The Allaire report was adopted by the Liberal Party after the failure of the Meech Lake Accord, a proposal to make much more modest changes to the Canadian constitution. The Meech Lake Accord would have amended the constitution of Canada to recognize Quebec as a "distinct society". When the Meech Lake Accord was not ratified by the legislatures of Manitoba and Newfoundland, Quebec sovereigntists portrayed it as a rejection of French-speaking Quebec by the rest of Canada, which was English-speaking. Support for sovereignty increased significantly in Quebec in the months after the failure of the Meech Lake Accord.

The adoption of the Allaire Report as official policy by the governing Liberals was seen as the party's response to the failure of the Meech Lake Accord. It signalled a much tougher and more nationalist negotiating position for future constitutional amendment talks, which Liberal leader and Quebec Premier Robert Bourassa felt was needed to take momentum away from the Parti Québécois, the pro-sovereignty opposition party. The French title of the report, "Un Québec libre de ses choix," was evocative of "Vive le Québec libre", a rallying slogan of supporters of Quebec independence from Canada.

The next round of constitutional amendment talks with Bourassa, the other Canadian premiers, federal Prime Minister Brian Mulroney and aboriginal leaders in 1992 resulted in the Charlottetown Accord proposals. The Charlottetown Accord did not propose any transfers of power from the federal government to the provincial governments (although it did confirm that certain powers already exercised by the provinces would be recognized as their exclusive powers). The Liberal Party then held a convention which approved the Charlottetown Accord, over the objections of Jean Allaire and the Liberal Party Youth Commission president, Mario Dumont.

Both Allaire and Dumont quit the Liberal Party over this issue and subsequently formed a new political party, Action Democratique du Quebec. Its main issue in the 1994 Quebec election was support for the principles of the Allaire Report. Mario Dumont won the ADQ's first seat in the Quebec National Assembly in 1994.

== See also ==
- Bélanger-Campeau Commission
- Constitutional debate in Canada
- List of documents from the constitutional history of Canada
- Politics of Quebec
- History of Quebec
