= Mario Dumont =

Canadian politician

Mario Dumont MNA
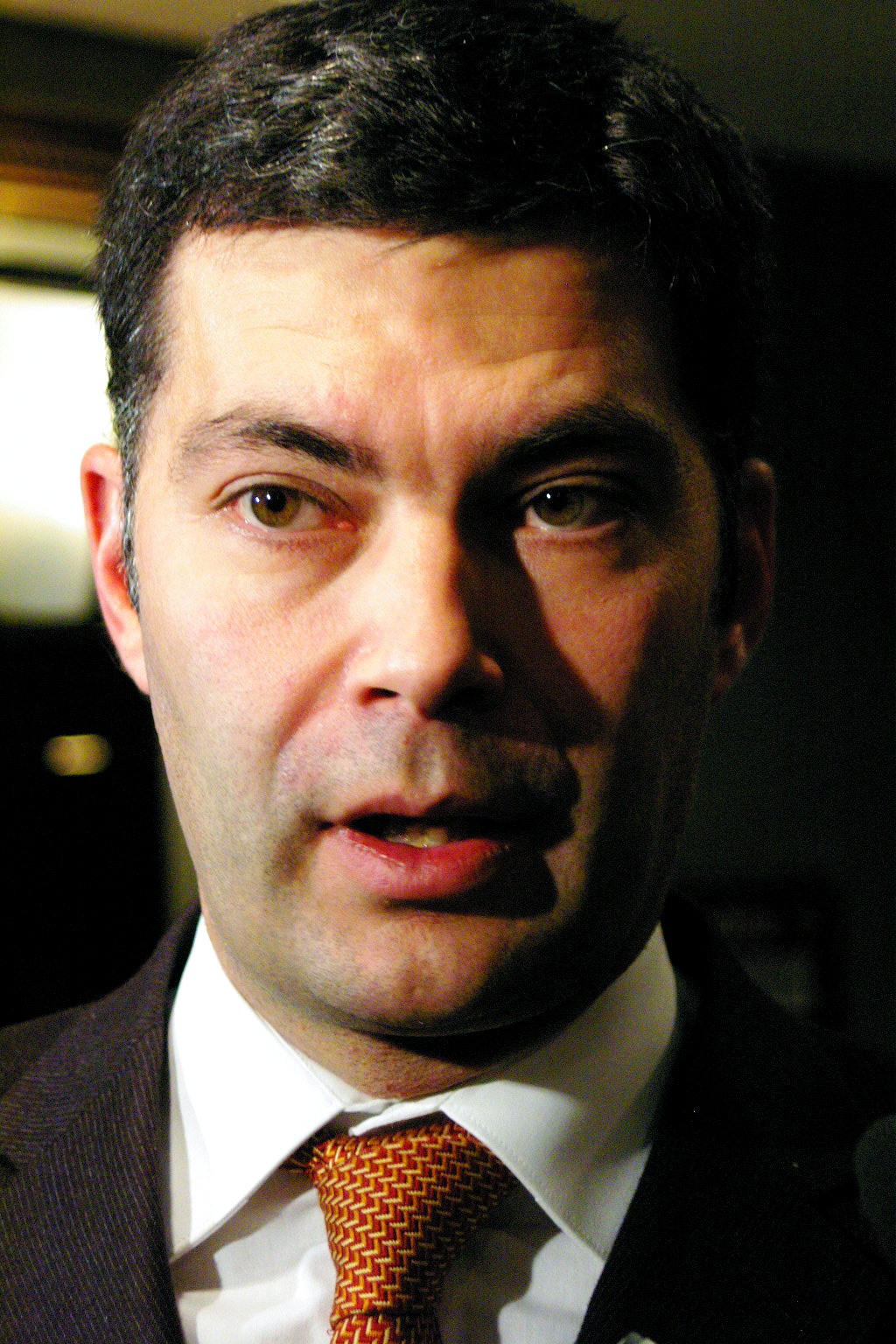
- Dumont in 2007

Leader of the Opposition of Quebec
- In office March 26, 2007 – November 5, 2008
- Preceded by: André Boisclair
- Succeeded by: Pauline Marois

Leader of the ADQ
- In office May 11, 1994 – March 6, 2009
- Preceded by: Jean Allaire
- Succeeded by: Sylvie Roy (interim)

MNA for Rivière-du-Loup
- In office September 12, 1994 – March 6, 2009
- Preceded by: Albert Côté
- Succeeded by: Jean D'Amour

Personal details
- Born: May 19, 1970 (age 56) Cacouna, Quebec, Canada
- Party: Action démocratique du Québec
- Spouse: Marie-Claude Barrette
- Children: Angela; Charles; Juliette
- Education: Concordia University (A.B.); University of Montreal
- Profession: Television presenter

Mario Dumont (born May 19, 1970) is a Canadian television personality and former politician in Quebec, Canada. He was a Member of the National Assembly of Quebec (MNA), and the leader of the Action démocratique du Québec (ADQ), from 1994 to 2009. After the 2007 Quebec election, Dumont obtained the post of Leader of the Opposition in the National Assembly.

Following his party's poor showing in the 2008 Quebec election, he announced his resignation as ADQ leader, and subsequently joined the television network V to host a daily news and talk show, Dumont, which began in 2009. He left that network in 2012 to join the all-news channel LCN.

== Biography ==
Dumont was born in Saint-Georges-de-Cacouna, Quebec. Dumont and his wife, Marie-Claude Barrette, have three children: Angela, Charles, and Juliette. Dumont obtained a Bachelor of Arts in Economics from Concordia University in 1993, and completed some graduate work at the Université de Montréal.

== Political career ==
=== Quebec Liberal Party ===
Dumont bought his first membership card in the Liberal Party of Quebec at age 15. He stated to his school friends that in the future he would be Quebec's premier. Dumont was a former President of the Liberal Party's Youth Commission, but had a falling out with the party following the rejection of the Allaire Report proposing maximalist powers for Quebec after the collapse of the Meech Lake Accord.

Dumont called himself and Michel Bissonnet, who preceded Dumont as leader of the Liberal youth wing, the first Liberal sovereigntists. This was the group that led the Liberal sovereigntist faction while Liberal premier Robert Bourassa remained unopposed.

Dumont organized the "Liberals for the No side," in the 1992 referendum on the Charlottetown Accord.

=== Action démocratique du Québec ===
Dumont and Liberal party insider Jean Allaire played a central role in the creation and development of the Action démocratique du Québec (ADQ) in 1994. He succeeded Allaire as leader after the latter resigned for health reasons.

Dumont was elected as an ADQ member of the National Assembly for Rivière du Loup in the 1994, 1998, 2003, 2007 and 2008 elections.

In the 1995 Quebec referendum, Dumont joined with Parti Québécois Premier Jacques Parizeau and Bloc Québécois leader Lucien Bouchard, who wooed him and with whom he remains close, in support of the sovereigntist campaign. Dumont revealed to Journalist Chantal Hébert and Jean Lapierre that they planned to use the 1995 Quebec referendum as a way to advocate for a new partnership between Quebec and Canada. However, Parizeau advocated for separation; so both Bouchard and Dumont followed his direction. In subsequent years, however he changed positions on the issue, arguing that the sovereignty question had been decided and that Quebecers had no desire to revisit it.

In the years that followed, the constitutional position of the ADQ changed to favour Quebec autonomism, supporting increased powers and responsibilities for Quebec while remaining within Canada. In practical terms, Dumont has supported the creation of a Quebec constitution, the change of the province's name to that of the "autonomous state of Québec", and the collection of all taxes by the provincial government, with the funds necessary for the federal government to fulfill its constitutional responsibilities being transferred to it by the province.

Since the 1998 provincial election, Dumont has distinguished himself primarily for his stances on economic issues, which are generally considered to be right of centre in the context of the predominantly social-democratic Quebec political scene. He advocates the payment of a cash allowance to parents who do not wish to make use of the province's $7 a day daycare program, changes to the provincial health system that would allow private for profit health care and private health insurance alongside the public system, the abolition of school boards, the encouragement of private education, a tougher criminal justice system, reductions in the size of the provincial bureaucracy, and the repayment of the province's $127 billion government debt.

Dumont was personally very popular, and for most of his career was far more popular than the ADQ as a whole. In fact, for many years, the ADQ tried to capitalize on Dumont's personal popularity by using the official name Action démocratique du Québec-Équipe Mario Dumont (Action démocratique du Québec-Team Mario Dumont). However, this didn't translate to support for his party; it never won much support in Montreal or the Outaouais.

==== 2007 Quebec election ====
In the 2007 Quebec election, the ADQ won 41 seats with 31% of the popular vote, and formed the Official Opposition in the National Assembly. Prior to the dissolution of the National Assembly, the ADQ had held only five seats, and as a result did not have official party status. Despite becoming the Official Opposition, the ADQ was almost nonexistent in several of the province's major cities. It won almost no seats in Montreal, Gatineau, Saguenay, Longueuil, Laval and Sherbrooke. Tasha Kheiriddin argued that his result would have given right-of-centre currents swirling in Quebec politics.

==== 2008 Quebec election ====
On October 23, 2008, two ADQ MNAs, André Riedl and Pierre-Michel Auger, crossed the floor to the governing Liberal Party, embarrassing Dumont. Quebec premier Jean Charest subsequently called a snap election for December 8, 2008. A Léger Marketing poll conducted between Friday, November 14 and Monday, November 17, showed the Liberals with 44% support, the PQ with 33%, and the ADQ with 15%.

The ADQ won a meagre seven seats (17% of the vote) in the election. Following this poor showing, Dumont retired from politics on election night.

== Television career ==
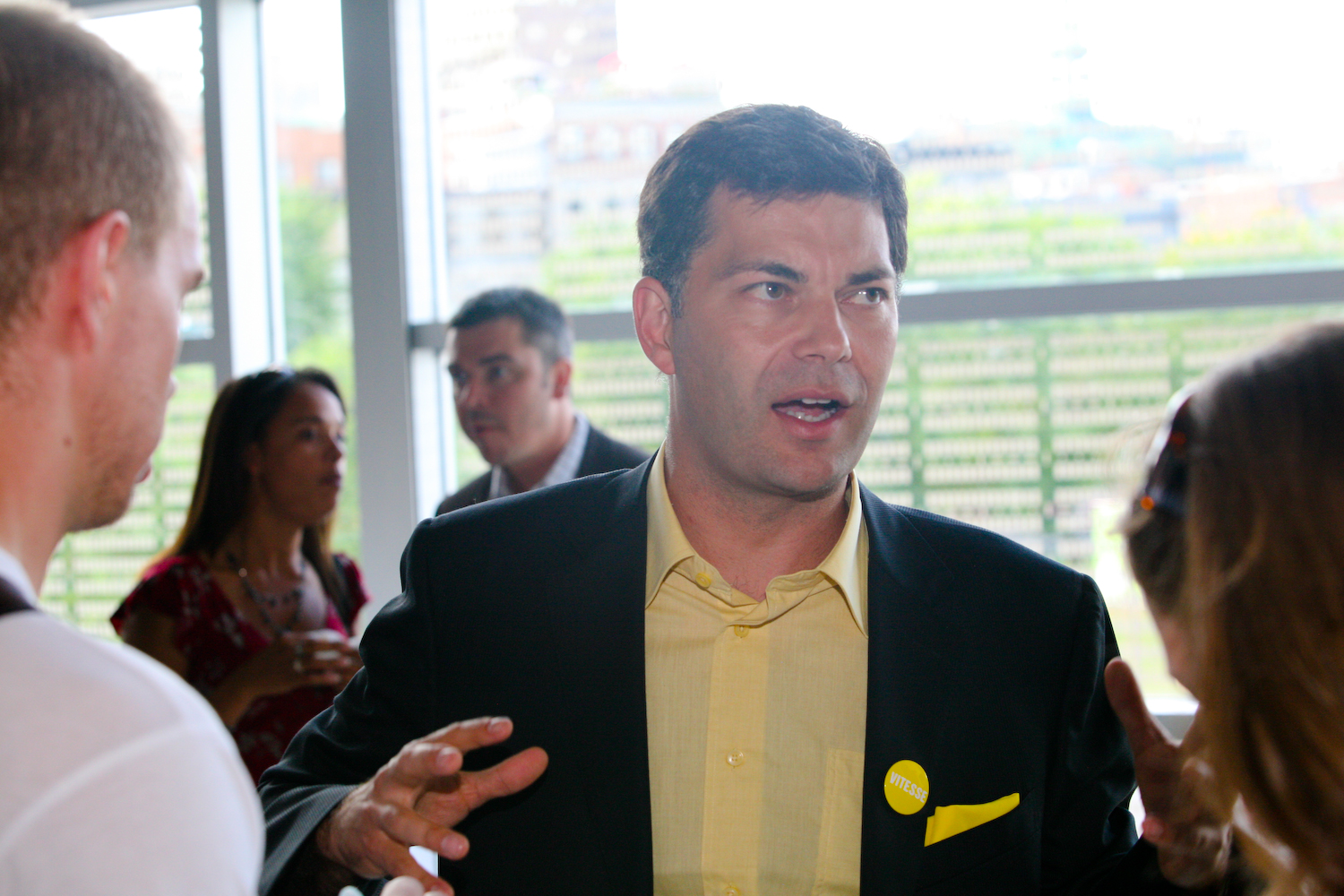
Mario Dumont at the launch party of his show Dumont 360 on V.

At TQS' 2009 upfronts presentation, it was announced that Dumont would join the network in the fall as host of a daily news and information series, Dumont 360. The series launched in September 2009, shortly after the network was rebranded as V.

In 2012, Dumont moved to LCN and began a new show called Mario Dumont.

Since 2018, he has also hosted his own radio show, Le retour de Mario Dumont, on QUB Radio.

== Votes of confidence ==
Date	Location	Result
April 2000	Saint-Hyacinthe	96.9%
September 2004	Drummondville	95.7%
March 2008	Laval	94.8%

== Bibliography ==
- Lessard, Denis (2007). L'Instinct Dumont (in French). Quebec: Voix Paralleles.

== Electoral record ==
2008 Quebec general election
Party	Candidate	Votes	%	±%
Action démocratique	Mario Dumont	11,115	51.77	-6.70
Liberal	Jean-Pierre Rioux	5,795	26.99	-1.29
Parti Québécois	Stephan Shields	3,048	14.20	+3.40
Independent	Victor-Lévy Beaulieu	597	2.78	–
Green	Alain Gagnon	513	2.39	-0.06
Québec solidaire	Stacy Larouche	400	1.86	–
Total valid votes		21,468	98.74	–
Total rejected ballots		273	1.26	–
Turnout		21,741	63.98	-14.29
Electors on the lists		33,981	–	–
Action démocratique hold		Swing		-2.70

2007 Quebec general election: Rivière-du-Loup
Party	Candidate	Votes	%	±%
Action démocratique	Mario Dumont	15,276	58.47	+1.24
Liberal	Jean D'Amour	7,390	28.29	+4.53
Parti Québécois	Hugues Belzile	2,821	10.80	-6.88
Green	Martin Poirier	639	2.45	+1.12
Total valid votes		26,126	99.20	–
Total rejected ballots		210	0.80	–
Turnout		26,336	78.27	+5.61
Electors on the lists		33,648	–	–

2003 Quebec general election
Party	Candidate	Votes	%	±%
Action démocratique	Mario Dumont	13,452	57.23	+10.89
Liberal	Jacque Morin	5,585	23.76	-1.55
Parti Québécois	Carol Gilbert	4,155	17.68	-9.15
Green	Julie Morin	312	1.33	–

1998 Quebec general election
Party	Candidate	Votes	%	±%
Action démocratique	Mario Dumont	10,897	46.34	-8.43
Parti Québécois	Lise Chouinard	6,308	26.83	-0.37
Liberal	Jean Morin	5,952	25.31	+7.92
Bloc Pot	Léo Legault	197	0.84	–
Independent	Daniel Morin	98	0.42	–
Socialist Democracy	Louis Leroux	61	0.26	–

1994 Quebec general election: Rivière-du-Loup
Party	Candidate	Votes	%	±%
Action démocratique	Mario Dumont	13,307	54.77	–
Parti Québécois	Harold LeBel	6,608	27.20	-14.85
Liberal	Jean D'Amour	4,226	17.39	-37.09
Independent	L. Richard Cimon	99	0.41	–
Natural Law	Armand Pouliot	55	0.23	–

Party political offices
Preceded by Michel Bissonnet	President of the Youth Commission of the Quebec Liberal Party; 1991–1992	Succeeded by Claude-Éric Gagné
Preceded by None	President of Action démocratique du Québec; 1994	Succeeded by Moncef Guitouni
Preceded by Jean Allaire	Leader of the Action démocratique du Québec; 1994–2009	Succeeded by Sylvie Roy (Interim)
National Assembly of Quebec
