= Nouvelle Alliance Québec-Canada =

New Quebec-Canada Alliance Nouvelle Alliance Québec-Canada
- Leader: Denis Couture
- Founded: 2009
- Dissolved: December 9, 2011
- Headquarters: 143, chemin de L'Écore Nord; Vallée-Jonction (Québec); G0S 3J0

Website
- reformefinanciere.com

The Nouvelle Alliance Québec-Canada (English: New Quebec-Canada Alliance) was a political party in Quebec. It was founded in 2009 as the "Parti de la réforme financière", and changed its name in 2010. Its main aim was for the provincial government to make more sensible choices in the way it spends the people's money. According to QuebecPolitique.com, the party also advocated "the recovery of the financial situation of Quebec by the repatriation of all taxing powers from Ottawa to Quebec." The chief electoral officer withdrew the party's authorization on December 9, 2011. The party later moved its website back to www.reformefinanciere.com.

== Platform ==
- The Government of Quebec collecting and administer all public monies
- Requesting more in equalization payments

== Electoral history ==
In the 2009 by-election in Rivière-du-Loup, leader Denis Couture ran under the Parti de la réforme financière banner, coming in 7th out of 8 candidates with 40 votes (0.19%).
