= Quebec Liberal Party =

Provincial political party in Canada

Quebec Liberal Party Parti libéral du Québec
- Abbreviation: PLQ; QLP
- Leader: Charles Milliard
- President: Rafael Primeau Ferraro
- Deputy leader: Julie White
- Parliamentary leader: André Fortin
- Founded: July 1, 1867; 159 years ago
- Headquarters: Montreal, Quebec, H2R 2Y8; Quebec City, Quebec, G1S 2P1
- Membership (2026): ▲25,000
- Ideology: Liberalism (Canadian); Canadian federalism
- Political position: Centre to centre-right; 1990s: Centre-right
- National affiliation: Liberal Party of Canada (until 1964)
- Colours: Red and blue
- Seats in the National Assembly: 39 / 127

Website
- plq.org/en/

The Quebec Liberal Party (QLP; French: Parti libéral du Québec, [paʁti libeʁal dy kebɛk], PLQ) is a provincial political party in Quebec. It has been independent of the federal Liberal Party of Canada since 1964.

The QLP has traditionally supported a form of Quebec federalist ideology with nuanced Canadian nationalist tones that supports Quebec remaining within the Canadian federation, while also supporting reforms that would allow substantial autonomism in Quebec. In the context of federal Canadian politics, it is a more centrist party when compared to Conservative and Liberal parties in other provinces, such as the former British Columbia Liberal Party.

== History ==
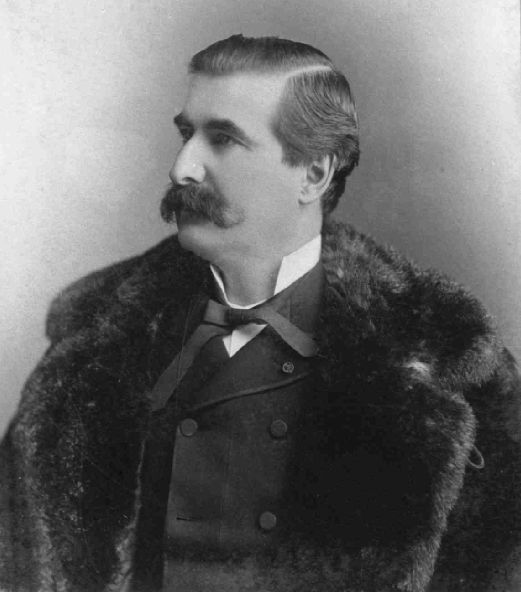
Premier Mercier.

=== Pre-Confederation ===
The Liberal Party is descended from the Parti canadien (or Parti Patriote), who supported the 1837 Lower Canada Rebellion, and the Parti rouge, which fought for responsible government and against the authority of the Roman Catholic Church in Lower Canada. The most notable figure of this period was Louis-Joseph Papineau.

=== Post-Confederation ===
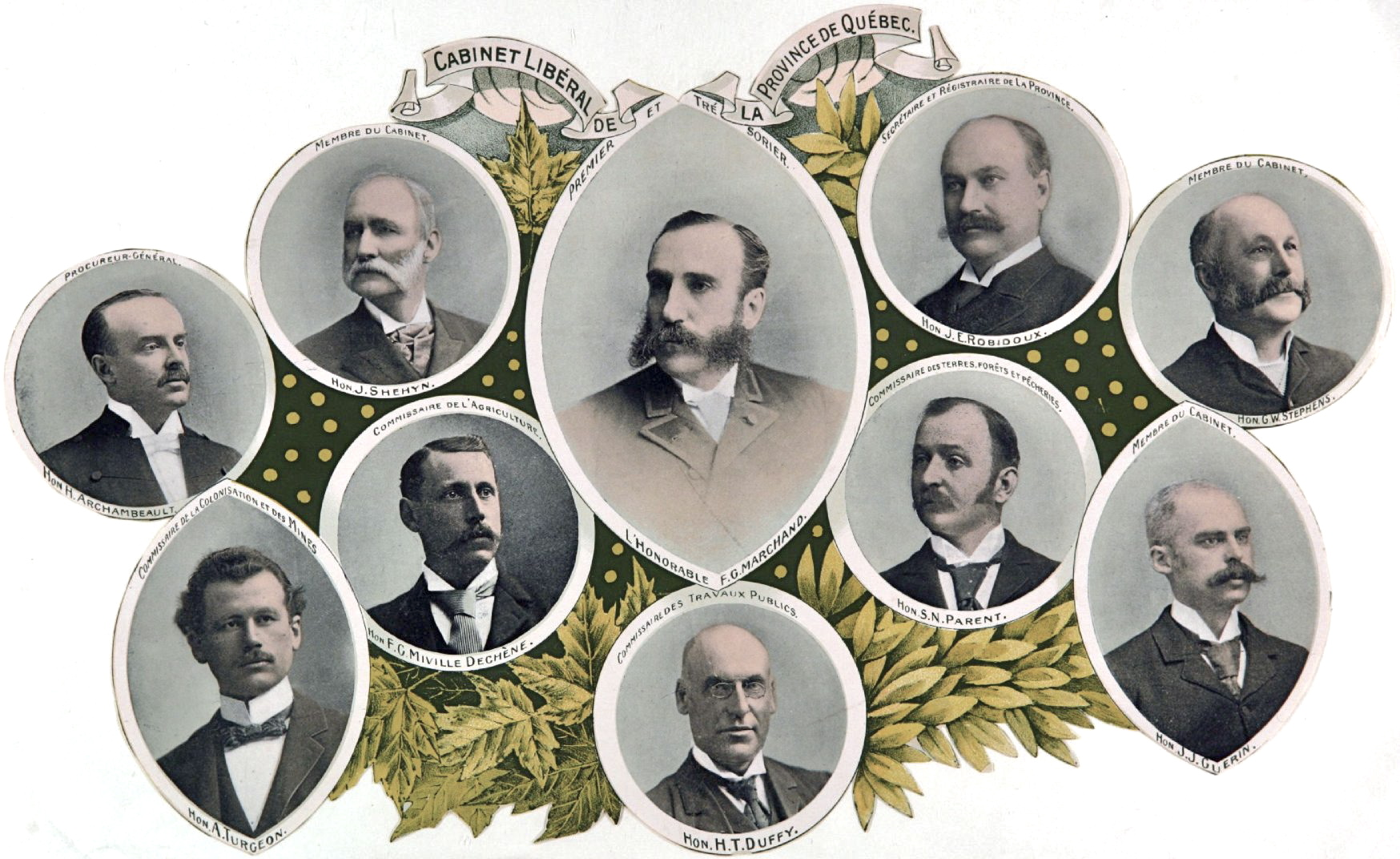
Members of Félix-Gabriel Marchand's government of 1897.

The Liberals were in opposition to the ruling Conservatives for most of the first 20 years after Canadian Confederation, except for 18 months of Liberal minority government in 1878–1879. However, the situation changed in 1885 when the federal Conservative government refused to commute the death sentence of Louis Riel, the leader of the French-speaking Métis people of western Canada. This decision was unpopular in Quebec. Honoré Mercier rode this wave of discontent to power in 1887, but was brought down by a scandal in 1891. He was later cleared of all charges. The Conservatives returned to power until 1897.

The Liberals won the 1897 election, and held power without interruption for the next 39 years; the Conservatives never held power in Quebec again. This mirrored the situation in Ottawa, where the arrival of Wilfrid Laurier in the 1896 federal election marked the beginning of Liberal Party of Canada dominance at the federal level. Notable long-serving Premiers of Quebec in this era were Lomer Gouin and Louis-Alexandre Taschereau.

By 1935, the Conservatives had an ambitious new leader, Maurice Duplessis. Duplessis merged his party with dissident ex-Liberals who had formed the Action libérale nationale. Duplessis led the new party, the Union Nationale (UN), to power in the 1936 election. The Liberals returned to power in the 1939 election, but lost it again in the 1944 election. They remained in opposition to the Union Nationale until one year after Duplessis's death in 1959.

In 1964, the QLP severed its affiliation with the Liberal Party of Canada.

=== Modern history ===
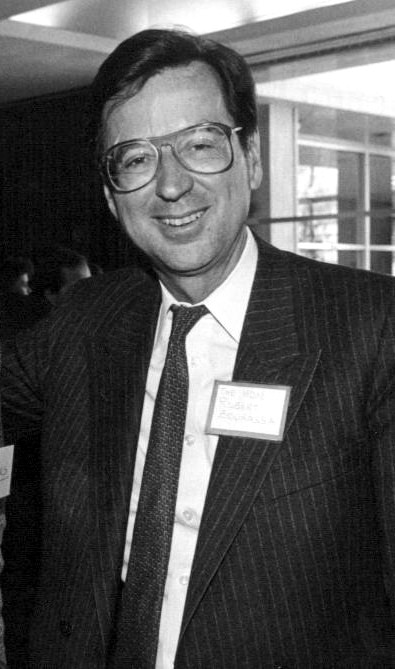
Premier Bourassa.

The Quebec Liberal Party has faced various opposing parties in its history. Its main opponent from the time of the Confederation (1867) to the 1930s was the Parti conservateur du Québec. That party's successor, the Union Nationale, was the main opposition to the Liberals until the 1970s. Since then the Liberals have alternated in power with the Parti Québécois, a Quebec sovereigntist, self-described social-democratic party and very recently with the Coalition Avenir Québec, a Quebec autonomist and conservative party.

The contemporary Quebec Liberal Party is a broad-based federalist and multiculturalist coalition, including among its members supporters of the federal Liberals, New Democratic Party, Bloc Québécois, Greens, and Conservatives.

Under Jean Lesage, the party won an historic election victory in 1960, ending sixteen years of rule by the national-conservative Union Nationale. This marked the beginning of the Quiet Revolution, which dramatically changed Quebec society. During the 1960s a social-democratic faction within the party was especially prominent and the party was seen as being on the centre-left. Under the slogans C'est l'temps qu'ça change (it's time for change) in 1960 and maîtres chez nous (masters in our own house) in 1962, the Quebec government undertook several major initiatives, including: full nationalization of the electricity industry through merger of 11 private companies with the government-owned Hydro-Québec — this major initiative of the government was led by the minister of natural resources, René Lévesque, in 1963, the creation of a public pension plan, the Régie des rentes du Québec (QPP/RRQ), separate from the Canada Pension Plan that exists in all other provinces of Canada, and creation of Caisse de dépôt et placement du Québec (CDPQ), the elimination of tuition fees for public elementary and secondary schools and creation of the Ministère de l'éducation du Québec, secularisation of schools and hospitals, creation of the Société générale de financement (SGF), creation of the first incarnation of the Office québécois de la langue française (OQLF, originally OLF), mandatory call for bids for all public works contracts above $25,000 (René Lévesque, 1960), creation of Obligations d'épargne du Québec (Quebec savings bonds) in 1963, right to strike in public service (1964), and the creation of an office in Paris, introduction of the Gérin-Lajoie doctrine, which established the foundation of Quebec 's international policy where Quebec can established its own international presence in areas that fall under its own provincial jurisdiction under the Canadian Constitution.

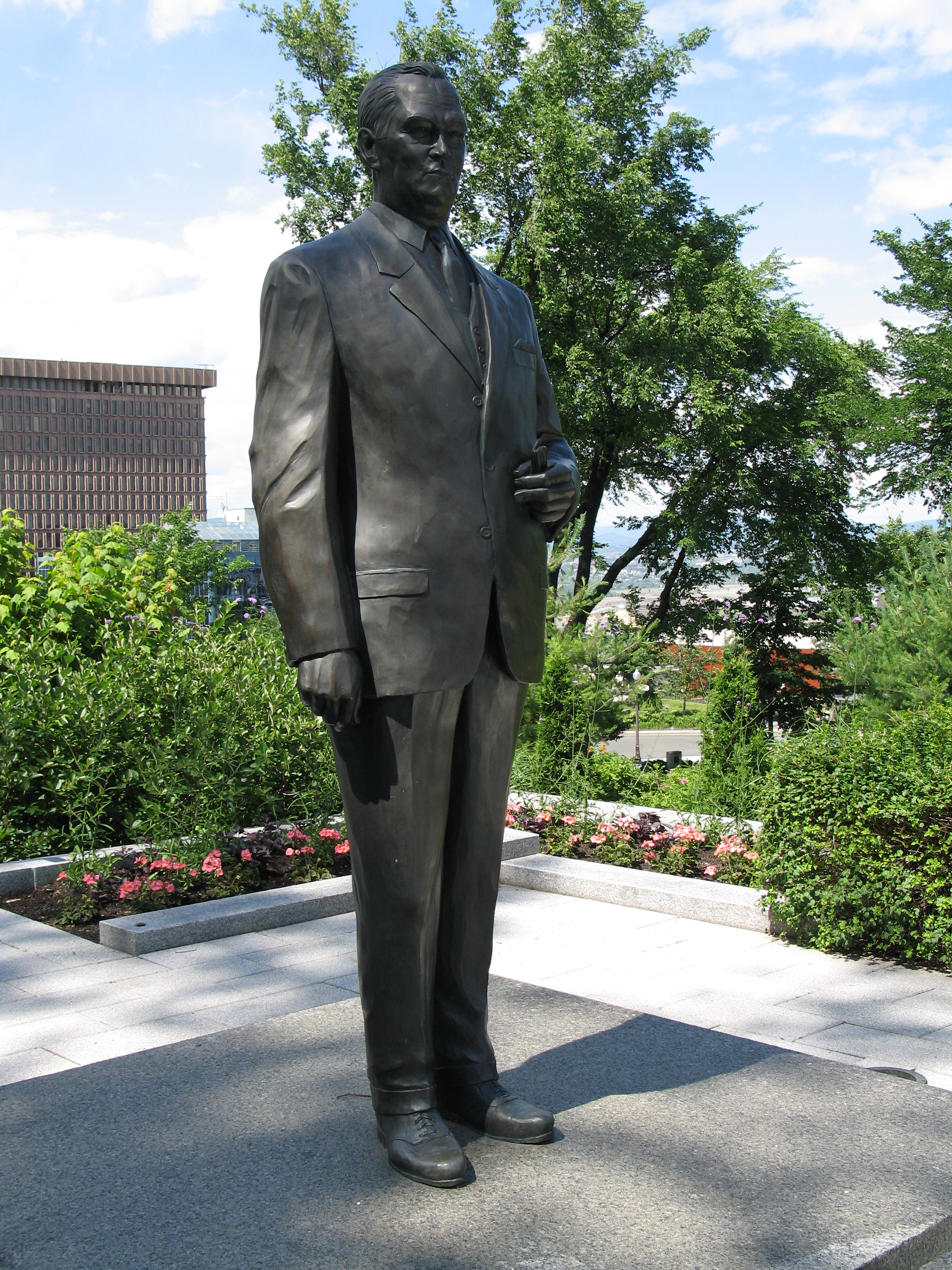
Statue of Jean Lesage in front of the Parliament Building

Under Lesage, the Liberals developed a Quebec nationalist wing. In July 1964, the Quebec Liberal Federation led by Lesage formally disaffiliated from the federal Liberal Party of Canada, making the Quebec Liberal Party a distinct organization from its federal counterpart.

In October 1967, former cabinet minister René Lévesque proposed that the party endorse his plan for sovereignty-association. The proposal was rejected and, as a result, some Liberals, including Lévesque, left the Liberals to join the sovereignty movement, participating in the founding of the Parti Québécois (PQ) under Lévesque's leadership.

Relations soured between the Quebec Liberal Party and the federal Liberal Party under Lesage, and worsened further under Robert Bourassa, who had a poor relationship with Canadian prime minister Pierre Trudeau.

First elected in 1970, Robert Bourassa instituted Bill 22 to introduce French as the official language in Quebec, and pushed Trudeau for constitutional concessions. Reelected in 1973, his government was also embarrassed by several scandals. Bourassa resigned from the party's leadership after the loss of the 1976 election to René Lévesque's Parti Québécois.

Bourassa was succeeded as Liberal leader by Claude Ryan, the former director of the respected Montreal newspaper, Le Devoir. Ryan led the successful federalist campaign in the 1980 Quebec referendum on Quebec sovereignty, but then lost the 1981 election. He resigned as Liberal leader some time later, paving the way for the return of Robert Bourassa.

When Bourassa returned as Premier in 1985, he persuaded the federal Progressive Conservative government of Brian Mulroney to recognize Quebec as a distinct society, and sought greater powers for Quebec and the other provinces. This resulted in the Meech Lake Accord and Charlottetown Accord. Both of these proposals, however, were not ratified. While a Quebec nationalist, Bourassa remained an opponent of independence for Quebec.

Daniel Johnson Jr. succeeded Bourassa as Liberal leader and Premier of Quebec in 1994, but soon lost the 1994 election to the Parti Québécois under Jacques Parizeau.

Party logo from 1994 to 2003.

In 1993, after the failure of the Charlottetown Accord, many nationalist members of the Liberal party led by Jean Allaire and Mario Dumont, including many from the party's youth wing, left to form the Action démocratique du Québec (ADQ) because the Liberal Party dropped most of its autonomist demands during the negotiation of the Charlottetown Accord. As in 1980, the QLP campaigned successfully for a "no" vote in the 1995 Quebec referendum on sovereignty.

Around the time of the 1998 Quebec general election, the party was referred to as being on the centre-right of the political spectrum.

The Liberals regained power in the 2003 election. Premier Jean Charest was a federal cabinet minister with the now-defunct Progressive Conservative Party, including a stint as Deputy Prime Minister and even serving as its leader for a time. The QLP government proposed a policy of reform of social programs and cuts to government spending and the civil service, and established a controversial health system fee for all taxpayers.

It has also softened language policies. In response to a Supreme Court of Canada decision overruling a loophole-closing stopgap measure enacted by the Bernard Landry government, the Liberals enacted Loi 104 which provides for English-language, unsubsidized private school students to transfer into the subsidized English-language system, thus receiving the right to attend English schools in Quebec for their siblings and all descendants, should the student demonstrate a bureaucratically defined parcours authentique within the English system. Meanwhile, the Office québécois de la langue française (Quebec Board of the French Language) under the Liberal provincial government has also opted for a demand-side strategy for the enforcement of language laws, using a number of publicity campaigns, including stickers which merchants may voluntarily affix on their shop windows stating that French service may be obtained within, allowing for consumers to "choose" stores which will serve them in French.

The Liberal party suffered a major setback in the 2007 election, which saw them reduced to a minority government, having lost francophone support to the surging ADQ. However, the party regained a majority in the 2008 election, which saw the collapse of ADQ support and the return of the Parti Québécois as the main opposition party. Election turnout was the lowest in Quebec since the Quiet Revolution.

Since its most recent election, the Liberal government has faced a number of scandals, including historic losses at the Caisse de dépôt et placement du Québec, the attribution of highly sought-after subsidized daycare spaces to Liberal Party donors, as well as allegations of systemic construction industry corruption which arose notably during the 2009 Montreal municipal election. After public pressure, the Liberal government eventually called for a public commission of inquiry. Jean Charest's personal approval ratings have at times been lower than those of other premiers.

In 2012, the Liberal government announced it was going to raise university tuition from $2,168 to $3,793 in increments between 2012 and 2017. This move proved controversial, leading to a significant portion of Quebec post-secondary students striking against the measures. In response to the discord the Quebec Liberal government introduced controversial emergency legislation via Bill 78 that restricted student protest activities, attacking students' right to strike and to demonstrate peacefully, and dealt with the administrative issues resulting from so many students missing classes.

After almost a decade in power, the Liberal government of Jean Charest was defeated in the 2012 provincial election by the Parti Québécois led by Pauline Marois. Charest was also personally defeated in his constituency and resigned as party leader.

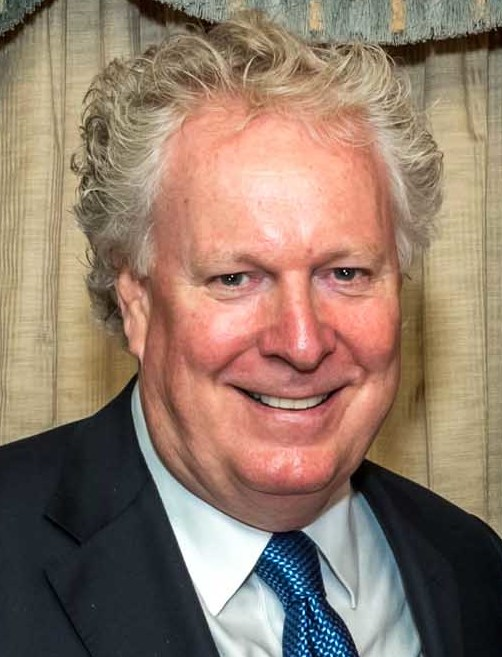
Premier Charest.

They came back into power during the 2014 election under Philippe Couillard. In the 2018 election, they became the official opposition, losing power to the Coalition Avenir Quebec.

The first Black leader of the party, Dominique Anglade, led the party into the 2022 election, coming fourth in vote share behind the CAQ, Quebec solidaire, and the PQ, but forming official opposition. The Liberals dropped to their lowest raw seat count since 1956, their lowest percentage of seats won since 1948 and their lowest share of the popular vote in their history.

In June 2025, former federal Cabinet minister Pablo Rodriguez was elected party leader. He became the first Hispanic to lead a provincial party in Quebec. In November, he removed parliamentary leader Marwah Rizqy from her post, citing that she fired her chief of staff without informing him beforehand. That same month, his leadership campaign was accused of allegedly financially rewarding voters for voting for him in the leadership race, accusations that Rodriguez denied. Amid these political crises, he resigned as party leader in December 2025, becoming the shortest-serving leader in QLP history. 2025 leadership election runner-up Charles Milliard was acclaimed to succeed Rodriguez on February 13, 2026. He led the QLP into the 2026 Quebec general election, which saw the party gain seats and remain as the official opposition.

== Party leaders ==
- Henri-Gustave Joly de Lotbinière (1867–1883) (premier 1878–1879)
- Honoré Mercier (1883–1892) (premier 1887–1891)
- Félix-Gabriel Marchand (1892–1900) (premier 1897–1900)
- Simon-Napoléon Parent (1900–1905) (premier 1900–1905)
- Lomer Gouin (1905–1920) (premier 1905–1920)
- Louis-Alexandre Taschereau (1920–1936) (premier 1920–1936)
- Adélard Godbout (1936–1949) (premier 1936, 1939–1944)
- George Carlyle Marler (interim) (1949–1950)
- Georges-Émile Lapalme (1950–1958)
- Jean Lesage (May 31, 1958 – January 17, 1970) (premier 1960–1966)
- Robert Bourassa (January 17, 1970 – 1976) (premier 1970–1976)
- Gérard D. Levesque (interim) (1976–1978)
- Claude Ryan (1978–1982)
- Gérard D. Levesque (interim) (1982–1983)
- Robert Bourassa (1983–1994) (premier 1985–1994)
- Daniel Johnson Jr. (1994–1998) (premier 1994)
- Monique Gagnon-Tremblay (interim) (1998)
- Jean Charest (1998–2012) (premier 2003–2012)
- Jean-Marc Fournier (interim) (2012–2013)
- Philippe Couillard (2013–2018) (premier 2014–2018)
- Pierre Arcand (interim) (2018–2020)
- Dominique Anglade (2020–2022)
- Marc Tanguay (interim) (2022–2025)
- Pablo Rodriguez (2025)
- Marc Tanguay (interim) (2025–2026)
- Charles Milliard (2026–present)

== Political positions ==
As per the 2026 Quebec general election.

=== Economy and employment ===
For the 2026 Quebec general election, the Quebec Liberal Party (QLP) places economic growth, productivity and job creation among its main priorities. The party proposes an industrial policy aimed at increasing the manufacturing sector's contribution to Quebec's gross domestic product from 12% to 15% by 2035, restoring funding for College Centres for the Transfer of Technologies and the Conseil de l'innovation, and reducing the tax rate for small and medium-sized businesses from 11.5% to 10%. It also proposes reducing the administrative burden on businesses through a two-for-one regulatory rule and mandatory deadlines for government approvals. In response to U.S. tariffs, the party proposes measures to support affected businesses and diversify Quebec's export markets.

=== Health care and public services ===
The QLP proposes expanding access to public health care through a province-wide telehealth platform integrated into primary care. The platform would provide patients with access to health professionals, including nurses, physician assistants and physicians, while maintaining in-person care when a physical examination is required. The party also identifies public services, particularly health care and education, as central to its economic and regional development agenda.

=== Housing ===
Housing is one of the QLP's principal campaign priorities. The party proposes eventually reaching 100,000 housing starts per year and refunding 36% of the Quebec sales tax on the purchase of a new house or condominium. It also proposes adding 40,000 social and affordable housing units over five years, including through new construction and acquisitions, with a target of 10,000 additional units per year by the end of the mandate. The party also proposes increasing the share of non-market housing to 20% of the housing market by 2050.

=== Education ===
The QLP proposes holding a national forum on Quebec's education system within the first 100 days of a Liberal government. It also proposes compensating certain currently unpaid internships in the public sector and reviewing and simplifying student financial aid, including its eligibility criteria. Other commitments include making reading a national priority, combating illiteracy, protecting funding for school books and libraries, and providing a clearer ethical framework for the use of artificial intelligence in education and public institutions.

=== Regional development and natural resources ===
The QLP proposes preserving and expanding public services in Quebec's regions and increasing regional participation in economic development and immigration planning. It proposes involving regions in determining their capacity to receive immigrants, revising the mining royalty system and creating a fund for mining communities. The party also proposes modernizing Quebec's forestry regime and improving transportation and telecommunications infrastructure in the regions.

=== Immigration and integration ===
The QLP proposes linking immigration planning more closely to regional economic needs and local capacity. Its 2026 commitments include giving the regions a role in determining their capacity to receive immigrants and strengthening French-language integration, including through increased funding for French-language training and improved French-language training in the workplace.

=== French language and culture ===
The QLP proposes an additional $380 million over four years for its French-language plan. The plan includes measures relating to reading, French-language instruction, francization, educational success, culture and the promotion of French in areas where its vitality is considered to be under pressure. The party presents French as Quebec's official and common language and emphasizes strengthening its use through education, integration and cultural initiatives.

=== Federalism and Quebec's place in Canada ===
The QLP maintains its federalist position and presents Quebec's development within the Canadian federation as part of its political vision. During the 2026 campaign, Charles Milliard has emphasized strengthening Quebec's economy while maintaining and developing its relationships with the rest of Canada, including through increased interprovincial trade and economic cooperation.

== Election results ==
Election	Leader	No. of candidates	No. of seats won	Change +/-	Standing	% of popular vote	Legislative role	Government
1867	Henri-Gustave Joly de Lotbinière	40	12 / 65	▲12	▲2nd	35.4%	Official Opposition	Conservative majority
1871	Henri-Gustave Joly de Lotbinière	38	19 / 65	▲7	2nd	39.4%	Official Opposition	Conservative majority
1875	Henri-Gustave Joly de Lotbinière	46	19 / 65	Steady	2nd	38.8%	Official Opposition	Conservative majority
1878	Henri-Gustave Joly de Lotbinière	59	31 / 65	▲12	▲1st	47.5%	Minority	Liberal minority
1881	Henri-Gustave Joly de Lotbinière	46	14 / 65	▼17	▼2nd	39.0%	Official Opposition	Conservative majority
1886	Honoré Mercier	49	33 / 65	▲19	▲1st	39.5%	Majority	Conservatives attempted to continue as a minority for three months until they resigned and were replaced by a narrow Liberal majority.
1890	Honoré Mercier	68	43 / 73	▲10	1st	44.5%	Majority	Initial Liberal Majority, became a minority due to defections and then replaced by Conservatives after the Liberal Premier was dismissed by the Lieutenant-Governor.
1892	Félix-Gabriel Marchand	62	21 / 73	▼22	▼2nd	43.7%	Official Opposition	Conservative majority
1897	Félix-Gabriel Marchand	78	51 / 74	▲30	▲1st	53.3%	Majority	Liberal majority
1900	Simon-Napoléon Parent	77	67 / 74	▲16	1st	53.1%	Majority	Liberal majority
1904	Simon-Napoléon Parent	87	68 / 74	▲1	1st	55.5%	Majority	Liberal majority
1908	Lomer Gouin	76	57 / 74	▼11	1st	54.2%	Majority	Liberal majority
1912	Lomer Gouin	83	62 / 81	▲5	1st	53.5%	Majority	Liberal majority
1916	Lomer Gouin	85	75 / 81	▲13	1st	64.0%	Majority	Liberal majority
1919	Lomer Gouin	99	74 / 81	▼1	1st	65.4%	Majority	Liberal majority
1923	Louis-Alexandre Taschereau	92	63 / 85	▼11	1st	52.9%	Majority	Liberal majority
1927	Louis-Alexandre Taschereau	86	74 / 85	▲9	1st	60.3%	Majority	Liberal majority
1931	Louis-Alexandre Taschereau	90	79 / 90	▲5	1st	54.9%	Majority	Liberal majority
1935	Louis-Alexandre Taschereau	91	48 / 89	▼31	1st	46.8%	Majority	Liberal majority
1936	Adélard Godbout	89	14 / 90	▼34	▼2nd	40.0%	Official Opposition	Union Nationale majority
1939	Adélard Godbout	87	70 / 86	▲56	▲1st	54.1%	Majority	Liberal majority
1944	Adélard Godbout	91	37 / 91	▼33	▼2nd	39.4%	Official Opposition	Union Nationale majority
1948	Adélard Godbout	93	8 / 92	▼29	2nd	36.2%	Official Opposition	Union Nationale majority
1952	Georges-Émile Lapalme	92	23 / 92	▲15	2nd	45.8%	Official Opposition	Union Nationale majority
1956	Georges-Émile Lapalme	93	20 / 93	▼3	2nd	44.9%	Official Opposition	Union Nationale majority
1960	Jean Lesage	95	51 / 95	▲31	▲1st	51.3%	Majority	Liberal majority
1962	Jean Lesage	97	63 / 95	▲12	1st	56.40%	Majority	Liberal majority
1966	Jean Lesage	108	50 / 108	▼13	▼2nd	47.29%	Official Opposition	Union Nationale majority
1970	Robert Bourassa	108	72 / 108	▲22	▲1st	45.40%	Majority	Liberal majority
1973	Robert Bourassa	110	102 / 110	▲30	1st	54.65%	Majority	Liberal majority
1976	Robert Bourassa	110	26 / 110	▼76	▼2nd	33.77%	Official Opposition	Parti Québécois majority
1981	Claude Ryan	122	42 / 122	▲16	2nd	46.07%	Official Opposition	Parti Québécois majority
1985	Robert Bourassa	122	99 / 122	▲57	▲1st	55.99%	Majority	Liberal majority
1989	Robert Bourassa	125	92 / 125	▼7	1st	49.95%	Majority	Liberal majority
1994	Daniel Johnson Jr.	125	47 / 125	▼45	▼2nd	44.40%	Official Opposition	Parti Québécois majority
1998	Jean Charest	125	48 / 125	▲1	2nd	43.55%	Official Opposition	Parti Québécois majority
2003	Jean Charest	125	76 / 125	▲28	▲1st	45.99%	Majority	Liberal majority
2007	Jean Charest	125	48 / 125	▼28	1st	33.07%	Minority	Liberal minority
2008	Jean Charest	125	66 / 125	▲18	1st	42.06%	Majority	Liberal majority
2012	Jean Charest	125	50 / 125	▼16	▼2nd	31.20%	Official Opposition	Parti Québécois minority
2014	Philippe Couillard	125	70 / 125	▲20	▲1st	41.50%	Majority	Liberal majority
2018	Philippe Couillard	125	31 / 125	▼39	▼2nd	24.82%	Official Opposition	Coalition Avenir Québec majority
2022	Dominique Anglade	125	21 / 125	▼10	2nd	14.4%	Official Opposition	Coalition Avenir Québec majority
2026	Charles Milliard	127	39 / 127	▲18	2nd	24.2%	Official Opposition	Parti Québecois minority

== See also ==
- Liberalism in Canada
- List of Quebec general elections
- List of Quebec premiers
- List of Quebec leaders of the Opposition
- Quebec Liberal Party leadership elections
