= Jacques Léonard =

Canadian politician (born 1936)

President of the Treasury Board and Minister responsible for Administration and the Public Service Also styled as Minister of State for Administration and the Public Service after December 15, 1998.
- In office November 3, 1995 – March 8, 2001
- Preceded by: Pauline Marois
- Succeeded by: Sylvain Simard

Minister of Transport
- In office March 5, 1984 – November 22, 1984
- Preceded by: Michel Clair
- Succeeded by: Guy Tardif
- In office September 26, 1994 – November 3, 1995
- Preceded by: Normand Cherry
- Succeeded by: Jean Campeau

Vice-President of the Treasury Board
- In office March 2, 1978 – November 6, 1980
- Preceded by: Denis de Belleval
- Succeeded by: Denis Vaugeois
- In office September 26, 1994 – November 3, 1995
- Preceded by: Jean Leclerc
- Succeeded by: Jacques Brassard

Minister responsible for the Laurentides
- In office January 29, 1996 – March 8, 2001
- Preceded by: Hélène Robert
- Succeeded by: François Legault

Minister of Municipal Affairs
- In office November 6, 1980 – March 5, 1984
- Preceded by: Guy Tardif
- Succeeded by: Alain Marcoux

Minister of State for Planning
- In office November 26, 1976 – November 6, 1980
- Preceded by: position created
- Succeeded by: Guy Tardif

Member of the National Assembly of Quebec for Labelle (known as Laurentides-Labelle before 1981)
- In office 1976 – May 23, 1985
- Preceded by: Roger Lapointe
- Succeeded by: Damien Hétu
- In office 1989 – March 8, 2001
- Preceded by: Damien Hétu
- Succeeded by: Sylvain Pagé

Personal details
- Born: December 2, 1936 (age 89) Saint-Jovite, Quebec, Canada
- Party: Parti Québécois
- Education: Université Laval

Jacques Léonard (French pronunciation: [ʒak leɔnaʁ]; born December 2, 1936) is a Canadian accountant, educator, and politician in the province of Quebec. He served in the National Assembly of Quebec from 1976 to 1985 and again from 1989 to 2001 and was a cabinet minister in the governments of René Lévesque, Jacques Parizeau, and Lucien Bouchard. Léonard is a Quebec sovereigntist and a member of the Parti Québécois (PQ) and Bloc Québécois (BQ).

== Early life and career ==
Léonard was born in Saint-Jovite, in the Laurentides region of Quebec. He received a diploma in accountancy in 1959 and a master's degree in commercial sciences from the Université Laval in 1962. After working for two years in the Montreal firm of Clarkson and Gordon, he continued his studies in Paris, France, from 1964 to 1966. Léonard taught at the École des hautes études commerciales and the Université national du Rwanda from 1966 to 1968, at which time he returned to Quebec. From 1968 to 1976, he was a professor and vice-dean of education at the Université de Montréal.

Léonard became a member of the sovereigntist Rassemblement pour l'Indépendance Nationale in 1962 and joined the Parti Québécois after the former party wound down in 1968. He ran unsuccessfully as a PQ candidate in Labelle in the 1970 and 1973 provincial elections. The PQ won a historic majority government in the 1976 provincial election, and Léonard was elected on his third attempt in Labelle over one-term Liberal incumbent Roger Lapointe.

== Legislator (1976–85) ==
=== Cabinet minister (1976–84) ===
Planning

Léonard was named to René Lévesque's first cabinet on November 26, 1976, as the minister of state responsible for planning. This was intended as one of five "superministry" portfolios in the cabinet; Léonard was entrusted with working on long-term strategy for land use rather than having the day-to-day administrative duties of a department. On March 2, 1978, he was also named as vice-president of the treasury board.

In May 1979, Léonard was a signatory to a deal that saw the governments of Quebec and Canada invest one hundred and fifty million dollars in Quebec's pulp and paper industry.

Municipal affairs

Léonard was reassigned as municipal affairs minister on November 6, 1980, exchanging portfolios with Guy Tardif. Shortly after his appointment, he ordered the municipal government of Aylmer to focus on basic administration after receiving a troubling audit of the city's finances.

In 1981, a representative of Montreal's municipal government requested that the Lévesque government impose a freeze on the construction of shopping centres, arguing that they often destroy traditional city centres. Léonard responded that he was reluctant to intervene, particularly as municipalities already had the power to impose a freeze themselves.

Léonard was re-elected in the 1981 general election, in which the Lévesque government was returned with a second consecutive majority, and was kept in the municipal affairs portfolio. He sought to restructure Montreal's municipal government in 1982, giving the smaller suburban communities more power in relation to the city. He faced opposition to this measure from long-standing Montreal mayor Jean Drapeau, whose power was threatened by the reform.

In 1983, Léonard attempted to pass legislation permitting the Quebec government to withhold funds from municipalities that accept federal money for job creation purposes. This bill was blocked in the legislature in December 1983, after the opposition Liberal Party threatened a filibuster. The Union des Municipalités du Québec also strongly opposed the measure, and discussions between the two levels of government reached an impasse in early 1984. After Léonard was moved to a different portfolio, the Lévesque government abandoned the legislation.

Transport

Léonard was shifted to the position of transport minister on March 5, 1984. Two months later, he said that the Quebec government would not make a bid for Nordair (which was then being sold by the federal government) but would oppose any deal under which the company would leave the province.

=== Opposition member (1984–85) ===
In late 1984, the Parti Québécois went through an internal crisis over Premier Lévesque's intention to de-emphasize Quebec sovereignty in the next provincial election. Léonard sided with the hardline indépendantiste wing of the party and resigned from cabinet on November 22. Five days later, he left the PQ caucus to sit as an independent member of the assembly. From the opposition benches, he demanded that Lévesque not make any constitutional agreement with Canadian prime minister Brian Mulroney that would result in a weakening of Quebec's Charter of the French Language.

In early 1985, Léonard joined an informal grouping of former PQ MNAs centered around the newly formed Rassemblement démocratique pour l'indépendance. He resigned his seat on May 23, 1985, to become dean of the faculty of education at the Université de Montréal, a position he held until his return to politics in 1989.

== Legislator (1989–2001) ==
=== Opposition member (1989–94) ===
Léonard returned to the Parti Québécois after Jacques Parizeau, a fellow indépendantiste and former cabinet colleague, became party leader in 1988. He was re-elected to the Quebec legislature in the 1989 provincial election over Liberal incumbent Damien Hétu, who had been elected in Labelle in 1985. The Liberals won a majority government provincially under Robert Bourassa's leadership, and Léonard re-entered the legislature as a member of the official opposition. For the next five years, he served as his party's finance critic. In 1993, he accused the Bourassa government of taking a laissez-faire approach to the economy and of having no overall vision.

=== Cabinet minister (1994–2001) ===
Transport minister

The Parti Québécois won a majority government under Parizeau's leadership in the 1994 general election. Léonard was re-elected to the legislature and rejoined cabinet on September 26, 1994, as minister of transport, ironically the same position he had resigned from ten years earlier. He was also appointed to a second term as vice-president of the treasury board.

After his appointment, Léonard argued that highways are an exclusively provincial jurisdiction and tried to postpone the government of Canada's planned national highway program. He announced increased penalties for persons driving under the influence of alcohol in 1995 and introduced legislation to require photographs on Quebec driving licenses. He also expressed scepticism about mandatory helmet laws for cyclists, saying that safety education was a better approach.

In early 1995, Léonard and industry minister Daniel Paillé announced a proposal to save the financially troubled MIL Davie Inc. shipyard with a ferry construction contract. Later in the year, he announced that the Parizeau government had no choice but to drop the plan on the grounds it had become too expensive and complex. Following protests from the shipyard workers, the government reversed itself a second time and agreed to a modified sixty-six million dollar construction program over two years.

Treasury Board president

Parizeau announced his resignation as premier after the sovereignty option's narrow defeat in the 1995 Quebec referendum. On November 3, 1995, while still leading a caretaker administration, he shuffled his cabinet and named Léonard as president of the treasury board and minister responsible for administration and the public service. In the following months, Parizeau, Léonard, and finance minister Pauline Marois worked in committee reviewing government expenses and revenues in a bid to reduce public spending.

Léonard was kept in the treasury board portfolio when Lucien Bouchard succeeded Parizeau as premier on January 29, 1996. He was also named to the priorities committee, an "inner cabinet" with significant control over the government's direction, and was named as minister responsible for the Laurentides. Over the next two years, he played a central role in the Bouchard government's ultimately successful effort to eliminate the provincial deficit.

He announced several austerity measures in March 1996, making significant spending cuts in areas such as health, education, and social assistance; the total cuts for the fiscal year amounted to $2.2 billion. In announcing these measures, Léonard said, "We have fallen behind other Canadian provinces in cleaning up public finances. Quebec must act now." He also expressed scepticism about proposed pay equity legislation later in 1996, arguing that it would put a strain on public-sector spending.

In late 1996, Léonard announced that the Bouchard government would try to achieve $1.4 billion in savings from Quebec's public-sector unions, to be achieved by unfreezing pension reserve funds rather than by taking measures that would result in significant job losses. The unions responded with a plan that focused on early retirement and employee buyouts. Negotiations continued into 1997.

Léonard introduced more severe funding cuts, amounting to $2.3 billion, in March 1997. At the same time, however, he noted that the Quebec's financial situation was improving and that no comparable cuts would be needed in the future. He also argued that the Bouchard government's austerity plan would benefit Quebec sovereignty in the long term, saying "once Quebec is much more financially solid, Quebecers will look at the future with much more confidence in themselves and their state." Ultimately, an unexpectedly high rate of voluntary retirement in the public sector allowed the government to reach its goals without difficulty. Léonard announced further cuts of one billion dollars in 1998 and noted that the province would be out of debt the following year.

Re-elected in the 1998 general election, Léonard was kept in the treasury board portfolio in Bouchard's post-election cabinet shuffle. In January 1999, he began a new round of negotiations with public-sector workers on collective agreements. After protracted discussions, the two sides agreed on a nine per cent wage increase over four years.

After years of cutbacks, Léonard projected a $1.1 billion budget surplus in March 1999 and announced new public spending in areas such as health, education, and information technology. He also introduced new hiring in the public service, with a particular focus on minority communities. The same financial trend continued the following year, and Léonard introduced more new program funding in 2000.

Lucien Bouchard resigned as premier on March 8, 2001, and was succeeded by Bernard Landry. Léonard used the occasion to announce his own resignation from both cabinet and the legislature, saying "You are witnessing a changing of the guard. My decision will allow one more young person to be promoted to cabinet." He returned to accountancy work and, in 2002, became a professor of political science at the Université du Québec à Montréal. He joined the board of governors of the Conseil de la Souveraineté du Québec in early 2003.

== Federal politics ==
In 2003–04, Léonard led a Bloc Québécois review of Canadian federal spending practices. He concluded that there had been sharp increases in some areas, including opinion polls, office furniture, and the office of the privacy commissioner of Canada.

Léonard ran as a Bloc Québécois candidate in the Montreal division of Outremont in the 2006 federal election and finished a close second against incumbent Liberal cabinet minister Jean Lapierre. Léonard later served as the Bloc's vice-president and worked on the party's campaign in the 2008 federal election.

== Electoral record ==
Federal

2006 Canadian federal election: Outremont
Party	Candidate	Votes	%	±%	Expenditures
Liberal	Jean Lapierre	14,282	35.18	−5.76	$69,816
Bloc Québécois	Jacques Léonard	11,778	29.01	−4.24	$63,590
New Democratic	Léo-Paul Lauzon	6,984	17.20	+3.14	$26,625
Conservative	Daniel Fournier	5,168	12.73	+6.76	$73,991
Green	François Pilon	1,957	4.82	+0.53	$425
Independent	Eric Roach Denis	101	0.25		$431
Progressive Canadian	Philip Paynter	94	0.23		none listed
Marxist–Leninist	Linda Sullivan	88	0.22	−0.09	none listed
Independent	Yan Lacombe	85	0.21		none listed
Independent	Xavier Rochon	34	0.08		$572
Independent	Régent Millette	22	0.05		none listed
Total valid votes		40,593	100.00		
Total rejected ballots		282	0.69		
Turnout		40,875	60.78	−4.65	
Electors on the lists		67,253			

Sources: Official Results, Elections Canada and Financial Returns, Elections Canada.

Provincial

1998 Quebec general election: Labelle
Party	Candidate	Votes	%	±%
Parti Québécois	Jacques Léonard	17,023	58.61	−7.17
Liberal	Raymond Laporte	9,024	31.07	−0.61
Action démocratique	Pierre Gauthier	2,781	9.57	
Socialist Democracy	Nicole Vallée	218	0.75	
Total valid votes		29,046	100.00	
Rejected and declined votes		397		
Turnout		29,443	76.01	−2.26
Electors on the lists		38,734		

Source: Official Results, Le Directeur général des élections du Québec.

1994 Quebec general election: Labelle
Party	Candidate	Votes	%	±%
Parti Québécois	Jacques Léonard	17,638	65.78	
Liberal	Marcel Lafleur	8,494	31.68	
Lemon	Bruno Fortier	342	1.28	–
Natural Law	Michele Turbide	340	1.27	
Total valid votes		26,814	100.00	
Rejected and declined votes		566		
Turnout		27,380	78.27	
Electors on the lists		34,980		

Source: Official Results, Le Directeur général des élections du Québec.

1989 Quebec general election: Labelle
Party	Candidate	Votes	%	±%
Parti Québécois	Jacques Léonard	16,897	54.80	
Liberal	Damien Hétu	13,938	45.20	
Total valid votes		30,835	100.00	
Rejected and declined votes		971		
Turnout		31,806	74.07	
Electors on the lists		42,938		

Source: Official Results, Le Directeur général des élections du Québec.

1981 Quebec general election: Labelle
Party	Candidate	Votes	%	±%
Parti Québécois	Jacques Léonard	17,596	57.70	
Liberal	Damien Hétu	11,822	38.76	
Union Nationale	Roger Labonté	1,079	3.54	–
Total valid votes		30,497	100.00	
Rejected and declined votes		246		
Turnout		30,743	79.93	
Electors on the lists		38,460		

Source: Official Results, Le Directeur général des élections du Québec.

1976 Quebec general election: Laurentides-Labelle
Party	Candidate	Votes	%	±%
Parti Québécois	Jacques Léonard	13,794	49.25	+17.48
Liberal	Roger Lapointe	9,725	34.72	−7.01
Union Nationale	Laurent Jetté	2,992	10.68	−1.27
Ralliement créditiste	Antonio Lemire	1,499	5.35	−9.20
Total valid votes		28,010	100.00	
Rejected and declined votes		374		
Turnout		28,384	83.32	+2.62
Electors on the lists		34,066		

Source: Official Results, Le Directeur général des élections du Québec.

1973 Quebec general election: Laurentides-Labelle
Party	Candidate	Votes	%
Liberal	Roger Lapointe	10,000	41.73
Parti Québécois	Jacques Léonard	7,612	31.77
Ralliement créditiste	Jean-Guy Sabourin	3,486	14.55
Union Nationale	Fernand Lafontaine	2,864	11.95
Total valid votes		23,962	100.00
Rejected and declined votes		275	
Turnout		24,237	80.70
Electors on the lists		30,035	

Source: Official Results, Le Directeur général des élections du Québec.

1970 Quebec general election: Labelle
Party	Candidate	Votes	%	±%
Union Nationale	Fernand Lafontaine	6,263	46.41	
Liberal	Benoît Robidoux	2,922	21.65	
Parti Québécois	Jacques Léonard	2,724	20.19	
Ralliement créditiste	Eugène Caraghiaur	1,585	11.75	
Total valid votes		13,494	100,00	
Total rejected ballots		134	0,98	
Turnout		13,628	84.83	
Eligible voters		16,066		

Source: Official Results, Le Directeur général des élections du Québec.
