= Society of Industrial and Office Realtors =

Industrial real estate association

- Abbreviation: SIOR
- Formation: 1940; 86 years ago
- Founder: Frank G. Binswanger Sr and David T. Houston Sr.
- Founded at: Philadelphia
- Type: Professional association
- Legal status: Non-profit association
- Purpose: Provide commercial real estate industry qualifications and advocate for the industry
- Professional title: SOIR
- Location: Washington D.C., United States
- Region served: North American and Europe
- Services: Membership qualifications
- Field: Commercial real estate
- Members: 4,000 (2024)
- President: Saadia Sheikh
- Funding: Member fees
- Website: www.sior.com

The Society of Industrial and Office Realtors (SIOR) is an international professional commercial and industrial real estate association based in Washington, D.C. It offers a professional designation (SIOR) to commercial brokers and other industry professionals.

As of 2018, it had 3,400 members in 686 cities and 36 countries. SIOR designees can hold the following specialty designations: industrial, office, sales manager, executive manager, or advisory service. SIOR also includes associate members, who are corporate executives, developers, educators, and others involved in the commercial real estate industry.

== History ==
SIOR was originally SIR (Society of Industrial Realtors). In 1939, the idea of forming an organization for industrial real estate brokers began. The sequence of events can be summarized as follows:

- Despite the continued growth of industrial real estate, industrial real estate specialists had little representation within the National Association of Real Estate Boards (NAREB).
- Industrial realtors Frank G. Binswanger and David T. Houston Sr. made an effort to organize and coordinate industrial realtors across the United States and Canada.
- They were able to gain sponsorship for the founding of Society of Industrial Realtors, and in the fall of 1940 at NAREB's national convention in Philadelphia, the formation of a national body of industrial realtors was approved.

One year and two months later, the US entered World War II.

The society was instrumental in locating existing, and immediately available, plant space that could be used to produce defense, and later, war material. Over 200 brokers from across the United States and Canada surveyed suitable facilities and reported their findings to the War Department (now the Department of Defense).

== Real Estate Index (CREI) ==
SIOR maintains the SIOR Commercial Real Estate Index (CREI) is a quarterly, attitudinal survey by market experts in the SIOR membership community.

It is a diffusion index, a routinely used index for economic measures.

The survey is based on the following topics in the questionnaire:

- Recent leasing activity
- Trends in asking rents
- Trends in vacancy rates
- Subleasing conditions
- Levels of concession packages in leases
- Development activity
- Site acquisition activity
- Investment pricing levels
- The impact of the local economy on the property market
- The effect of the national economy on the property market

== Structure ==
SIOR has membership chapters on a global scale.

They are the following:

- SOIR United States - United States chapters
- SIOR Canada - East, West, and Central Canada Chapters
- SIOR Mexico - Mexico Chapter and the Juarez-El Paso Chapter
- SIOR Europe - Regional Chapter

== See also ==
- International real estate
- National Association of Realtors
- US Commercial Real Estate Index
