= Ivanhoé Cambridge =

Canadian real estate company

Ivanhoé Cambridge Inc.

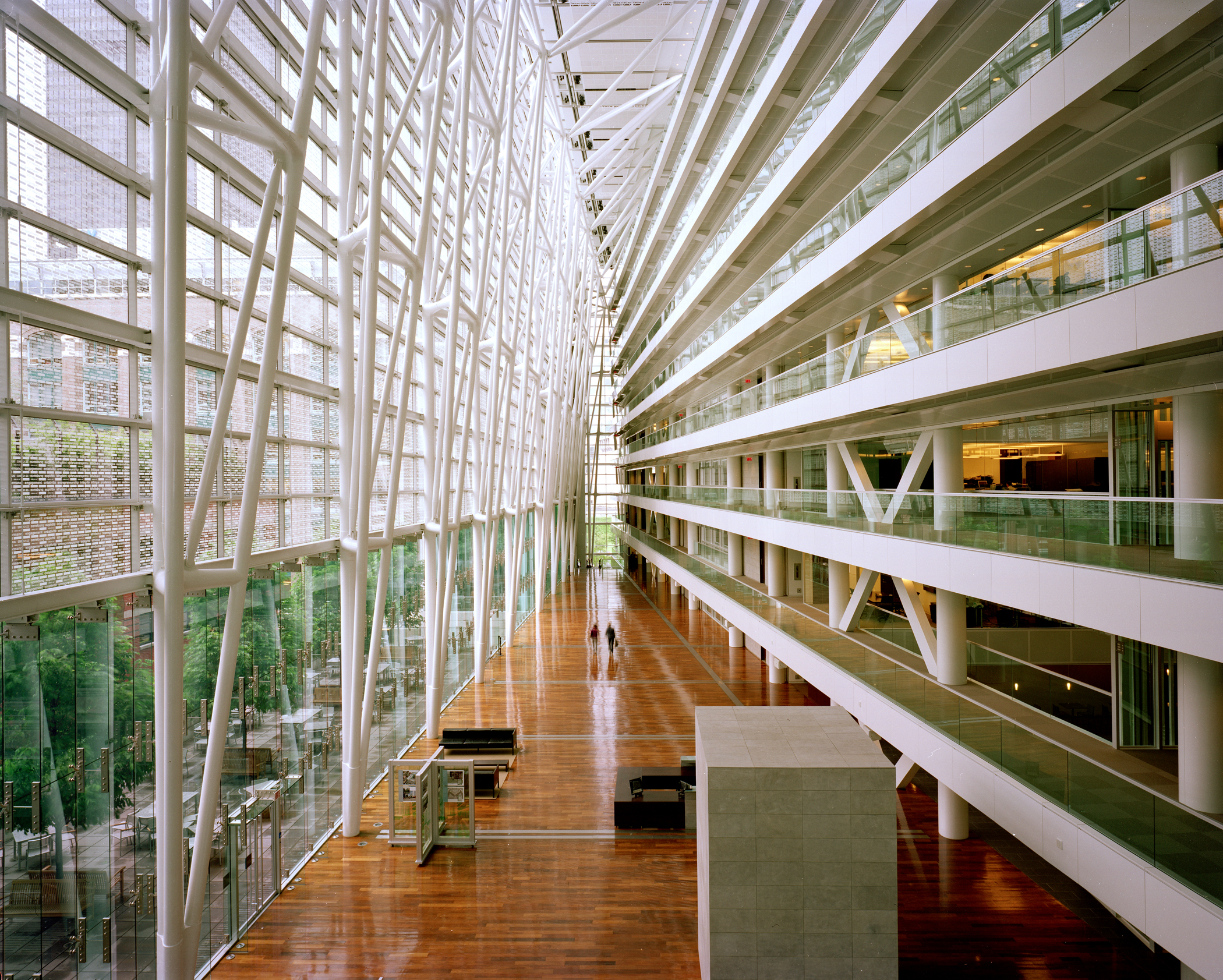
- The company's head office in Montreal
- Trade name: La Caisse
- Type: Subsidiary
- Industry: Real estate: Investment, Development, Management
- Founded: May 12, 1953; 73 years ago
- Headquarters: 1001, rue du Square-Victoria; Montreal, Quebec, Canada; H2Z 2B5
- Area served: Worldwide
- Key people: Nathalie Palladitcheff (president and CEO)
- Total assets: ▲ C$77,0 billion (2022)
- Number of employees: 1000+ (2020)
- Parent: Caisse de dépôt et placement du Québec
- Website: ivanhoecambridge.com

Ivanhoé Cambridge Inc. is a Canadian real estate company based in Montreal, Quebec. With assets around the globe, its areas of activity are investment, development, asset management, operations and leasing. The company's real estate portfolio consists primarily of multi-residential properties, industrial/logistics real estate, shopping centres and office properties. It also has ownership interests in real estate investment funds and hotels. Ivanhoé Cambridge is a subsidiary of the Caisse de dépôt et placement du Québec (CDPQ). On June 16, 2025, CDPQ announced that Ivanhoé Cambridge would operate under the name La Caisse.

The first entity in the real estate portfolio, Ivanhoe Corporation, was founded in 1953 by Sam Steinberg, a Montreal businessman who built Steinberg's grocery store chain. Ivanhoé Cambridge, headquartered in Montreal, has more than 1,000 employees worldwide. Ivanhoé Cambridge is now among the ten largest real estate companies in the world. The value of its assets, located mostly in Canada, the United States, Europe, Brazil and Asia, totalled more than C$60.4 billion on December 31, 2020.

On October 15, 2019, Daniel Fournier retired as chairman and chief executive officer. Nathalie Palladitcheff, who already held the title of President, became chief executive officer on that date.

Ivanhoé Cambridge's global investment strategy is diversified, which is why the company invests in different ways, whether through direct investing, through partnerships, by creating investment platforms or through real estate investment funds.

== History ==
=== Ivanhoe Corporation ===
The initial entity in what later became the Ivanhoé Cambridge real estate group dates to May 12, 1953, when Montreal businessman Sam Steinberg, who built the Steinberg's grocery store chain, founded Ivanhoe Corporation. In 1954, Ivanhoe opened its first shopping centre, Dorval Gardens, in the Montreal area. Ivanhoe specialized in shopping centres located in growing urban areas.

In the 1980s, Ivanhoe Corporation, which had become Ivanhoe Inc., was the largest real estate company in Quebec and the sixth-biggest in Canada.

When the Caisse de dépôt et placement du Québec acquired Ivanhoe Inc. in 1990, its portfolio consisted of 36 shopping centres, located mostly in Quebec and Ontario. The value of Ivanhoe's real estate portfolio was then about C$1 billion, making it one of Canada's largest real estate companies.

Up until the 1990s, Ivanhoe's owned-and-operated portfolio basically consisted of shopping centres built by the late Sam Steinberg. Ivanhoe made its first major acquisitions in 1995 with Les Galeries Rive Nord and Place Montréal Trust. In 2000, Ivanhoe's portfolio grew to include Centre Eaton de Montréal, a prestigious shopping centre located along the city's main commercial artery, and Place Laurier, one of the largest shopping malls in the province of Quebec.

=== Cambridge Shopping Centres Limited ===
While Ivanhoe was growing, Cambridge Leaseholds Limited was founded in Windsor, Ontario, in 1960, by members of the Tabachnik and Odette families. Two years later, the company opened its first Cambridge-branded shopping centre, Gateway Plaza in Windsor. Many other shopping centres were built by Cambridge throughout the decade in Ontario, New Brunswick and Alberta. Cambridge Leaseholds Limited became a public company, listed on the Toronto Stock Exchange, in 1969. In 1971, the company opened its first Quebec shopping centre, Les Rivières, in Trois-Rivières. One year later, it built Les Galeries de Hull, also in Quebec. In 1984, Cambridge Shopping Centres Limited was created and acquired all outstanding shares of Cambridge Leaseholds Limited. Cambridge continued to grow by building or acquiring interests in shopping centres in British Columbia, Ontario and Newfoundland as well as in California, in the United States.

At the start of the 1990s, Cambridge Shopping Centres Limited, with more than 1,000 employees, had real estate assets exceeding CA$2 billion. In 1992, two years after Ivanhoe was acquired by Caisse de dépôt et placement du Québec, it began purchasing shares in Cambridge Shopping Centres Limited. Its interest grew from 15.3% to 23.4% in 1993.

=== SITQ ===
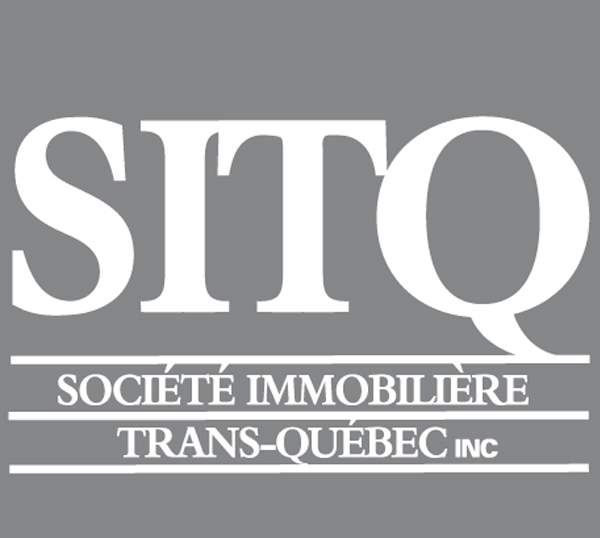

In the mid-1980s, while Ivanhoe and Cambridge were building and acquiring shopping centres in Quebec and elsewhere in Canada, the Caisse de dépôt et placement du Québec created the Société immobilière Trans-Québec (SITQ) in 1984, specializing in real estate investment, management and development. SITQ focused on three particular business sectors: office buildings and hotels, multi-residential buildings and retirement homes, and, finally, real estate investment funds. In 1991, the acquisition of the 1981 McGill College building marked a turning point in SITQ's strategy, with a growing emphasis on high-quality office buildings in the heart of major urban centres. Two years later, the company conducted its first international acquisition, the Centre de conférences Albert Borschette in Brussels, in partnership with Compagnie immobilière de Belgique. In 1996, SITQ began negotiations to acquire five office buildings in suburban Paris's La Défense business district. The transaction, completed in 1997, positioned SITQ as one of the major real estate owners in La Défense. Over the next few years, the Prisma, Friedland, Anjou and Adria office buildings, together with all land still available in La Défense, were added to the SITQ portfolio. The Tour T1 and Immeuble B would be erected there. Expansion continued in outside markets throughout the decade, and SITQ built a major portfolio of buildings. There were also acquisitions in the United States, the United Kingdom, Germany and India. At December 31, 2009, the value of SITQ's portfolio was C$17.8 billion.

=== Ivanhoé Cambridge ===
In August 1999, Ivanhoe became the majority shareholder in Cambridge following a CA$331 million investment. On October 1, 2000, Cambridge Shopping Centres Limited became a wholly owned subsidiary of Ivanhoe. Less than four months later, in February 2001, Ivanhoe and Cambridge Shopping Centres Limited were merged under the name Ivanhoé Cambridge Inc. It became one of Canada's biggest retail real estate management, development and investment companies.

Ivanhoé Cambridge disposed of its small and medium-sized shopping centres in the years following the merger. In the following decade, Ivanhoé Cambridge also divested itself of large shopping centres that no longer met its expectations. Place Sainte-Foy is the only shopping centre built by the former Ivanhoe that is still managed by its successor company, Ivanhoé Cambridge. The company still has under its management a handful of shopping centres that were developed by Cambridge Shopping Centres or its predecessor Cambridge Leaseholds Limited. Ivanhoé Cambridge also has ownership in malls that are operated by Cadillac Fairview.

On April 21, 2011, the Caisse de dépôt et placement du Québec announced it was grouping its real estate subsidiaries into a single entity, Ivanhoé Cambridge. The new company brought together its pre-existing subsidiaries in shopping centres (Ivanhoé Cambridge) and in office buildings, hotels, multi-residential buildings and retirement homes, as well as real estate investment funds (SITQ).

In 2021, Ivanhoé Cambridge transferred the operations of its Canadian shopping malls to the Chicago-based firm JLL. More than 300 workers were transferred from Ivanhoé Cambridge to JLL and another 26 positions were eliminated.

== Bibliography ==
- Gibbon, Ann; Hadekel, Peter (1990). Steinberg: The Breakup of a Family Empire. Toronto: Macmillan of Canada. ISBN 0-7715-9102-0.
- Marchand, Sarah; Linteau, Paul-André (2009). Investir, construire et habiter le monde, Les 25 ans de SITQ. Histoire et perspectives (in French). Montreal: Boréal. ISBN 978-2-7646-0666-7.
