= Roger Lapointe =

Canadian politician (born 1940)

Mayor of Mont-Saint-Michel, Quebec
- Incumbent
- Assumed office 1997

Prefect of the municipalité régionale de comté d'Antoine-Labelle
- Incumbent
- Assumed office 2005
- Preceded by: André Brunet

Member of the National Assembly of Quebec for Labelle
- In office 1973–1976
- Preceded by: Fernand Lafontaine
- Succeeded by: Jacques Léonard

Personal details
- Born: September 10, 1940 (age 85) Ferme-Neuve, Quebec, Canada

Roger Lapointe (born September 10, 1940) is a Canadian politician in the province of Quebec. He was a Liberal member of the National Assembly of Quebec from 1973 to 1976 and has been the mayor of Mont-Saint-Michel since 1997.

== Early life and career ==
Lapointe was born in Ferme-Neuve, Quebec. He has a Bachelor of Arts degree (1961) and a teaching degree (1962) from the Université Laval, and in 1971 he earned a degree in educational administration from the Université de Montréal. Lapointe taught math and sciences in Mont-Laurier in the Commission scolaire Henri-Bourassa from 1962 to 1966, was coordinator of education from 1966 to 1970, and served as director of education from 1970 to 1973.

Lapointe was founder and president of the Commission scolaire Henri-Bourassa teaching association, and from 1964 to 1966 he was a member of the provincial council of the Corporation des enseignants du Québec. He also served as president of the board of directors of the Notre-Dame-de-Sainte-Croix hospital in Mont-Laurier in the early 1970s.

== Legislator ==
Lapointe was elected to the National Assembly of Quebec in the 1973 provincial election, defeating Union Nationale incumbent Fernand Lafontaine in the division of Labelle. The Liberal Party won a landslide majority government in this election under Robert Bourassa's leadership, and Lapointe served for the next three years as a government backbencher. He was defeated by Parti Québécois candidate Jacques Léonard in the 1976 provincial election.

== Return to education ==
Lapointe was director of educational services at the Commission scolaire Henri-Bourassa from 1979 to 1982, when he was hired in the same position at the Commission scolaire Pierre-Neveu. He was promoted to director general of the latter institution in 1985 and served in this role until 1997. From 1998 to 2003, he worked as an investment broker.

== Mayor ==
Lapointe was elected as mayor of Mont-Saint-Michel in 1997 and has been re-elected without opposition in every election since. He became prefect of the municipalité régionale de comté d'Antoine-Labelle in 2005 and was re-elected in 2007 and 2009. On that latter occasion, he said that he would continue to work in areas such as road expansion, high speed internet access, and economic diversification planning. Lapointe is also active with the Fédération Québécoise des Municipalités.

In 2006, he accused the Quebec Federation of Labour of unnecessarily dragging out a strike in Ferme-Neuve.

== Electoral record ==
Municipal

2009 Mont-Saint-Michel municipal election: Mayor
Candidate	Votes	%
(x)Roger Lapointe	acclaimed	.

Source: Résultants 2009, Affaires municipales, Régions et Occupation du territoire Québec.

2005 Mont-Saint-Michel municipal election: Mayor
Candidate	Votes	%
(x)Roger Lapointe	acclaimed	.

Source: Élections municipales 2005 - Résultats des élections pour les postes de maire et de conseiller, Affaires municipales, Régions et Occupation du territoire Québec.

2001 Mont-Saint-Michel municipal election: Mayor
Candidate	Votes	%
(x)Roger Lapointe	acclaimed	.

Source: Élections municipales 2001 - Résultats des élections pour le poste de maire, Affaires municipales, Régions et Occupation du territoire Québec.

Provincial

1976 Quebec general election: Laurentides-Labelle
Party	Candidate	Votes	%	±%
Parti Québécois	Jacques Léonard	13,794	49.25	+17.48
Liberal	Roger Lapointe	9,725	34.72	−7.01
Union Nationale	Laurent Jetté	2,992	10.68	−1.27
Ralliement créditiste	Antonio Lemire	1,499	5.35	−9.20
Total valid votes		28,010	100.00	
Rejected and declined votes		374		
Turnout		28,384	83.32	+2.62
Electors on the lists		34,066		

Source: Official Results, Le Directeur général des élections du Québec.

1973 Quebec general election: Laurentides-Labelle
Party	Candidate	Votes	%
Liberal	Roger Lapointe	10,000	41.73
Parti Québécois	Jacques Léonard	7,612	31.77
Ralliement créditiste	Jean-Guy Sabourin	3,486	14.55
Union Nationale	Fernand Lafontaine	2,864	11.95
Total valid votes		23,962	100.00
Rejected and declined votes		275	
Turnout		24,237	80.70
Electors on the lists		30,035	

Source: Official Results, Le Directeur général des élections du Québec.
