= Vallerand =

Vallerand is a surname. Notable people with the surname include:

- André Vallerand (born June 9, 1940), Canadian politician
- Jean Vallerand (December 24, 1915– June 24, 1994), Canadian classical violinist, composer, conductor, music critic, educator and writer
- Marc-Olivier Vallerand (born April 17, 1989), Canadian ice hockey player

== See also ==
- Valérand Poullain (1509?–1557), French Calvinist minister
