= Jean Lapierre =

Canadian politician (1956–2016)

The Honourable Jean Lapierre PC

Minister of Transport
- In office 20 July 2004 – 5 February 2006
- Prime Minister: Paul Martin
- Preceded by: Tony Valeri
- Succeeded by: Lawrence Cannon

Member of the Canadian Parliament for Shefford
- In office 1979–1993
- Preceded by: Gilbert Rondeau
- Succeeded by: Jean H. Leroux

Member of the Canadian Parliament for Outremont
- In office 28 June 2004 – 28 January 2007
- Preceded by: Martin Cauchon
- Succeeded by: Thomas Mulcair

More...

Personal details
- Born: Jean-Charles Lapierre; 7 May 1956 Bassin, Quebec, Canada
- Died: 29 March 2016 (aged 59) Iles de la Madeleine, Quebec, Canada
- Party: Liberal; Bloc Québécois
- Spouse: Nicole Beaulieu (m. 1989)
- Profession: Broadcaster

Jean-Charles Lapierre PC (7 May 1956 – 29 March 2016) was a Canadian politician and television and radio broadcaster. After retiring from the government in 2007, he served as a political analyst in a variety of venues.

He was Paul Martin's Quebec lieutenant during the period of the Martin government. He was first elected to the House of Commons in 1978, serving from 1979 to 1993, and representing the riding of Shefford. He sat as a Liberal from 1979 to 1990, and later as an independent. He returned after an eleven-year absence when he won a seat in the 2004 federal election for the Montreal riding of Outremont. On 20 July 2004, he was appointed to the Canadian Cabinet as Minister of Transport, serving until the 2006 election. Lapierre resigned as the MP for Outremont on 28 January 2007.

In 2016, Lapierre died on a private plane that crashed on approach to Îles-de-la-Madeleine Airport. There were no survivors among the seven people on board, which included two pilots, Lapierre, his wife, and three of his siblings; Lapierre and his family were travelling to his father Raymond's funeral.

== Early life, education and marriage ==
Born 7 May 1956, Jean Lapierre was the oldest son of Raymond and Lucie Lapierre. He had younger siblings: a sister Martine and brothers Marc and Louis Lapierre.

He married and had two children: Marie-Anne and Jean-Michel Lapierre. Later, the couple divorced. Lapierre married Nicole Beaulieu in 1989.

== Early political career ==
=== Liberal ===
Lapierre was elected to the House of Commons in 1978, serving from 1979 to 1993, representing the riding of Shefford, Quebec. He sat as a Liberal from 1979 to 1990. Lapierre was a Quebec federalist; together with Pierre Trudeau, he opposed the 1980 Quebec referendum alternative to establish sovereignty for the province. In the first referendum on the place of Quebec in Canada, continued federal status won with nearly 60 per cent of the vote.

After Trudeau retired from politics in 1984, he was succeeded as Prime Minister and party leader by John Turner. Turner appointed Lapierre at age 28 to cabinet (at the time, the youngest minister to serve in a federal cabinet) as minister of state for youth and amateur sport. Lapierre's tenure was brief as Turner called an election nine days after being sworn in, and the Liberals lost.

Lapierre was a strong proponent of the Meech Lake Accord, and Turner and Martin also expressed support for it. Trudeau publicly campaigned against it, and Jean Chrétien opposed it as well.

=== Bloc Québécois ===
Upon leaving the Liberals, Lapierre sat as an independent, helping to found the Bloc Québécois and serving in their first caucus. In 1992, he retired from politics for a time and abandoned his affiliation with the Bloc. Lapierre has said that he never fully identified as a separatist and was the "red of the rainbow" in a temporary ad hoc rainbow coalition. He wanted to gain a level playing field for Quebec.

== Broadcaster ==
In private life, Lapierre was well known in Quebec as a broadcaster and talk show host for Montreal radio station CKAC. He also worked simultaneously as a TV news presenter for a time.

== Return to Liberals ==
Lapierre never fully gave up his political ambitions or his personal loyalty to Paul Martin. When the latter became liberal leader in December 2003, Lapierre returned to party politics after a decade away.

Martin appointed Lapierre as his Quebec lieutenant. He had a different style from his predecessors, most of whom were cautious, soft-spoken, and mindful of the effects of their Quebec actions on the rest of Canada. By contrast, Lapierre had what a CBC commentator described as a "rough and tumble, shoot from the hip style of politics", being known for his flamboyance, aggressiveness, toughness, rudeness and arrogance.

News analysts questioned the need for a Quebec lieutenant, as Martin was bilingual. In addition, polls showed fading support for the Bloc Québécois and Parti Québécois (who lost the 2003 provincial election), suggesting less need for a lieutenant. Others believed that Martin placed high importance on Quebec, hoping to fare significantly better than Chrétien had. He considered Lapierre to be crucial to winning over part of the nationalist vote.

=== 2004 federal election ===
In the 2004 federal election, Lapierre was expected to deliver the vote in Quebec, but this was difficult following the sponsorship scandal of the Liberal Party. The scandal severely hurt the party's support, especially in that province, while the rival Bloc Québécois gained support. Lapierre said that it would help the Liberals if the Royal Canadian Mounted Police could "lay some charges already" in the sponsorship probe.

Years later, Lapierre said the sponsorship scandal had damaged the party like getting hit by a Mack truck. When Bloc Québécois leader Gilles Duceppe tried to link Liza Frulla to the Sponsorship Scandal, saying that her 2002 by-election campaign was funded by members implicated in the scandal, Lapierre described it as "the cheapest thing you can do—try to start gossip that has no foundation".

The Liberals were able to retain a plurality of seats to continue governing, but they were reduced to a minority. In Quebec, they lost 15 of the 36 seats won in 2000, and their popular vote fell from 44 to 34 per cent, while the Bloc Québécois captured 54 of the 75 seats.

=== Minister of Transport ===
As Minister of Transport, Lapierre initiated the Pacific Gateway Strategy, signing air transport agreements with China and India and completed a formal Canada-US Open Skies Agreement. He also spearheaded a large federal investment in the Prince Rupert container terminal, saying that it improved ties to Asian markets while enhancing economic development in northern British Columbia and Alberta. Lapierre reduced the amount paid by airports to the federal government by some $5 billion over the remaining life of the leases. He announced the implementation of a No Fly List to increase security for airline passengers.

As Transport Minister, his predecessor Tony Valeri had dismissed VIA Rail chairman Jean Pelletier, who filed a lawsuit against the government charging it had failed to use due process. A federal court ruled in his favour in November 2005 after the change in administrations, ordering Pelletier to be reinstated. The government appealed the court ruling and kept the former chair off the payroll. Lapierre ensured that due process was followed in dismissing Pelletier a second time. But in March 2007, Justice Francois Lemieux ruled that the Martin government acted improperly in 2005 when it fired Pelletier a second time, immediately after a court had overturned his first dismissal, stating that Lapierre was biased and failed to follow proper procedures. On 22 November 2007, Judge Hélène Langlois of the Quebec Superior Court ruled that the government of then-Prime Minister Paul Martin had acted in a "cavalier and precipitous" fashion when it fired Pelletier. The court awarded Pelletier $235,000 in lost income and a further $100,000 in damages.

Lapierre and his department were criticized for their handling of the collapse of the carrier Jetsgo. Critics said that he should have seen warning signs after unsuccessful attempts to lower the carrier's costs. They also said he had failed to warn the public or intervene, making him indirectly responsible when thousands of travellers were stranded when the carrier stopped operations. Lapierre rejected calls to resign and denied that he had any knowledge of the collapse. He pointed out that most of the passengers had booked flights with credit cards and would be eligible for refunds.

=== Opposition ===
Lapierre retained his position as Quebec lieutenant for the 2006 election. He was personally re-elected without much difficulty, though with a reduced margin. But, the Liberals lost power in the campaign, falling from 21 to 13 seats in Quebec. They were surpassed by the Conservatives in the popular vote.

Paul Martin resigned as parliamentary leader on election night and as party leader a month later. Interim successor Bill Graham appointed Lapierre to his shadow cabinet as Industry critic.

Lapierre was neutral in the 2006 Liberal leadership election, by which Stéphane Dion was elected Liberal leader. Lapierre afterwards planned to announce that he would not run for re-election in Outremont, saying that his "commitment was to Mr. Martin for one mandate." Lapierre commented that Dion was the first leader not to have to cope with a divided party, after decades of infighting between Trudeau/Turner and Chrétien/Martin.

== Return to broadcasting ==
On 11 January 2007, Lapierre announced that he would retire from political office at the end of the month. He did so on 28 January 2007.

He started work as a political analyst with Quebec television network TVA and Montreal radio station 98.5 FM. He co-hosted a political show with reporter Paul Larocque: Larocque-Lapierre. He was also political commentator for CJAD and FM 98.5 radio in Montreal, and FM 93 in Quebec city. He contributed regularly to Power Play and Question Period on the CTV network.

In 2014, Lapierre was coauthor with Chantal Hébert of the non-fiction book The Morning After: The 1995 Quebec Referendum and the Day that Almost Was. It was a shortlisted nominee for the 2015 Shaughnessy Cohen Prize for Political Writing.

== Death ==
On 29 March 2016, Jean Lapierre died in a plane crash short of the airport in the Magdalen Islands. All seven travellers on board died, including his wife Nicole Beaulieu, sister Martine Lapierre, and brothers Marc and Louis Lapierre. The family was en route to the funeral of Lapierre's father, Raymond C. Lapierre, who had died a few days earlier. All of the Lapierre family members were honoured in a service at Les Îles-de-la-Madeleine in early April. They are survived by Marie-Anne and Jean-Michel Lapierre, children of Jean and his first wife, Gabrielle Choinière; and Lucie Lapierre, Raymond's widow.

Lapierre and Beaulieu were given a funeral at Saint-Viateur d'Outremont church in Montreal on 16 April 2016, attended by extended family, friends, political and broadcasting colleagues, and dignitaries including Prime Minister Justin Trudeau and his wife Sophie Gregoire Trudeau. His daughter Marie-Anne Lapierre gave the eulogy.

The plane was travelling faster and at a higher altitude than recommended, according to the federal Transportation Safety Board. The agency said that the plane crashed short of the airport soon after the pilot turned off the autopilot and lowered the landing gear. Almost immediately afterwards, the Mitsubishi MU-2B-60 aircraft "rolled quickly into a steep right bank and descended rapidly" before smashing to the ground.

== Honours ==

Ribbon	Description	Notes
	125th Anniversary of the Confederation of Canada Medal	1993; As a Member of Her Majesty's Privy Council for Canada, Mr. Lapierre would have been awarded with the Canada 125 medal. Canadian order of precedence.
	Queen Elizabeth II Golden Jubilee Medal for Canada	2002; As a Member of Her Majesty's Privy Council for Canada, Mr. Lapierre would have been awarded with the Golden Jubilee Medal.; http://gg.ca/honour.aspx?id=43509&t=6&ln=Lapierre
	Queen Elizabeth II Diamond Jubilee Medal for Canada	2012; As a Member of Her Majesty's Privy Council for Canada, M. Lapierre would have been awarded with the Diamond Jubilee Medal. Canadian order of precedence.; http://gg.ca/honour.aspx?id=771&t=13&ln=Lapierre

== Electoral record ==
2006 Canadian federal election: Outremont
Party	Candidate	Votes	%	±%	Expenditures
Liberal	Jean Lapierre	14,282	35.18	−5.76	$69,816
Bloc Québécois	Jacques Léonard	11,778	29.01	−4.24	$63,590
New Democratic	Léo-Paul Lauzon	6,984	17.20	+3.14	$26,625
Conservative	Daniel Fournier	5,168	12.73	+6.76	$73,991
Green	François Pilon	1,957	4.82	+0.53	$425
Independent	Eric Roach Denis	101	0.25		$431
Progressive Canadian	Philip Paynter	94	0.23		none listed
Marxist–Leninist	Linda Sullivan	88	0.22	−0.09	none listed
Independent	Yan Lacombe	85	0.21		none listed
Independent	Xavier Rochon	34	0.08		$572
Independent	Régent Millette	22	0.05		none listed
Total valid votes		40,593	100.00		
Total rejected ballots		282	0.69		
Turnout		40,875	60.78	−4.65	
Electors on the lists		67,253			

Source: Official Results, Elections Canada and Financial Returns, Elections Canada.

2004 Canadian federal election: Outremont
Party	Candidate	Votes	%	Expenditures
Liberal	Jean Lapierre	15,675	40.94	$58,392
Bloc Québécois	François Rebello	12,730	33.25	$63,640
New Democratic	Omar Aktouf	5,382	14.06	$11,371
Conservative	Marc Rousseau	2,284	5.97	$38,835
Green	Shaun Perceval-Maxwell	1,643	4.29	475
Marijuana	Yan Lacombe	452	1.18	none listed
Marxist–Leninist	Linda Sullivan	120	0.31	none listed
Total valid votes		38,286	100.00	
Total rejected ballots		359		
Turnout		38,645	56.13	
Electors on the lists		68,855		

Source: Official Results, Elections Canada.

1988 Canadian federal election: Shefford
Party	Candidate	Votes	%	±%
Liberal	Jean Lapierre	23,943	48.24	+0.73
Progressive Conservative	Danielle Coté	21,445	43.21	+0.27
New Democratic	Paul Pearson	4,242	8.55	+1.89
Total valid votes		49,630	100.00	

1984 Canadian federal election: Shefford
Party	Candidate	Votes	%	±%
Liberal	Jean Lapierre	25,483	47.51	-20.96
Progressive Conservative	Denis Loubier	23,028	42.94	+22.18
New Democratic	Denis Boissé	3,569	6.65	-1.16
Parti nationaliste	Pierre C. Boivin	1,552	2.89	
Total valid votes		53,632	100.00	

1980 Canadian federal election: Shefford
Party	Candidate	Votes	%	±%
Liberal	Jean Lapierre	32,449	68.47	+17.00
Progressive Conservative	Armand Russell	9,837	20.76	-2.79
New Democratic	Denis Boissé	3,701	7.81	+5.76
Rhinoceros	Cornélius André Brazeau	1,274	2.69	+1.12
Marxist–Leninist	Gilles Davignon	129	0.27	
Total valid votes		47,390	100.00	

1979 Canadian federal election: Shefford
Party	Candidate	Votes	%	±%
Liberal	Jean Lapierre	25,287	51.47	+12.13
Progressive Conservative	Gérald R. Scott	11,567	23.54	+6.93
Independent	Gilbert Rondeau	6,454	13.14	
Social Credit	Murielle Audette	3,922	7.98	-33.64
New Democratic	Denis Boisse	1,008	2.05	-0.37
Rhinoceros	Lyse Dumouchel	770	1.57	
Union populaire	Gilles Maille	121	0.25	
Total valid votes		49,129	100.00	

== Archives ==
There is a Jean Lapierre fonds at Library and Archives Canada.

27th Canadian Ministry (2003–2006) – Cabinet of Paul Martin
Cabinet post (1)
Predecessor	Office	Successor
Tony Valeri	Minister of Transport; 2004–2006	Lawrence Cannon
23rd Canadian Ministry (1984) – Cabinet of John Turner
Cabinet post (1)
Predecessor	Office	Successor
	Minister of State (Youth) (Fitness and Amateur Sport); 1984	
