= Ministre d'État à l'Aménagement (Quebec) =

The Ministre d'Etat à l'Aménagement (known in English as the Minister of State for Planning) is a former cabinet position in the government of Quebec. It was introduced by premier René Lévesque in 1976 and subsequently restructured under a different name after the Parti Québécois internal crisis of 1984. Ministers who held the position were responsible for overseeing long-term land-use and territorial planning.

Premier Lévesque named Jacques Léonard as Quebec's first planning minister on November 26, 1976, at the swearing in of the first Parti Québécois government following the party's historic victory in the 1976 general election. The position was intended to focus on long-term strategy, and Léonard was not entrusted with the day-to-day responsibilities of running a government department. Guy Tardif replaced Léonard in 1980 and was in turn replaced by François Gendron in 1981.

The author and journalist Graham Fraser has written that planning ministers were styled with the title, "Ministre responsable de l'Office de planification et de développement du Québec," as of February 2, 1977. Quebecpolitique.com indicates that the office was restructured as the "ministry of planning and regional development" starting on September 30, 1982.

In late 1984, the position was restructured again as the Ministre d'État à la Concertation.
