= Léo-Paul Lauzon =

Canadian politician

- Born: November 27, 1946 (age 79); Montreal, Quebec, Canada
- Education: HEC Montréal; University of Grenoble
- Occupations: author, accountant, professor, social activist
- Political party: New Democratic Party

Léo-Paul Lauzon (born November 27, 1946) is an author, researcher, accountant, professor, and social activist in Quebec. He is best known for his work in seeking corporate social accountability.

== Early life and education ==
Lauzon was raised in a low-income household in Montreal. His father abandoned the family in the late 1950s, when Lauzon was twelve, and he was forced to work as a delivery boy for a pharmaceutical company to support his mother and two sisters. Lauzon has said that the poverty of his early years helped him develop a strong social conscience, adding that he "didn't have the time or the luxury of being a political revolutionary" while attending school.

He is a chartered accountant, having placed first among all students in Quebec's 1970 examination. He also finished first among 1,778 candidates in Canada's 1974 certified management accountancy examination. This has not prevented him from criticizing his profession; in 1991, he said that "accounting is closer to the occult sciences than to exact mathematics." He has called for accounting students to be given a more humanistic learning approach, with the intent of creating independent thinkers who are effective at creating social change.

Lauzon has a Master of Business Administration degree from the HEC Montréal and a Ph.D. in management sciences from the University of Grenoble in France. He joined the accounting sciences department of the Université du Québec à Montréal in 1973 and founded the university's chair of socio-economic sciences in 2006.

== Social accounting ==
Lauzon published a book entitled Social Accounting in 1974, promoting a system of evaluating companies in terms of social responsibility. Since then, Lauzon examined several companies in areas such as environmental protection, human relations, equal opportunities and consumer interests, making extensive use of corporate annual reports.

In a 1989 interview, he said, "Being an accountant is an excellent training to criticize big business. I know how corporate executives think because I have the same mentality myself. The only difference is that I have a social conscience and most of them don't." He added that he was "blacklisted in many business circles" and said that some of his colleagues were afraid to work with him because of his reputation. Later in the same year, however, Lauzon said that his research was gaining mainstream acceptance and that Le Journal de Montréal and the Quebec Management Accounting Association were funding some of his work.

Lauzon has said that he is not anti-capitalist and supports private enterprise. He describes himself as a social democrat.

== Studies of corporate culture ==
Francophones in Quebec business

Lauzon released a report in 1986 that showed strong disparities between Quebec businesses as regards the number of francophones in key decision-making positions: most "decision makers" in some companies were francophone, while in others they represented less than ten per cent of the total. The study has been interpreted as showing the rise of a new francophone business culture in Quebec, rather than francophone integration into traditionally dominant anglophone companies.

Women in business

In 1987, Lauzon oversaw a study indicating that less than three per cent of top management jobs in Canadian companies were held by women, despite the fact that more women were entering the workforce. At the time of the report's release, he said, "If you listen to representatives of the private sector, then we're in the best possible world, and women hold important positions. [...] This research is based on facts that show clearly that reality is very different." He added that there was no valid reason for the numbers to be so low and that private sector firms were afraid of change in this field.

Follow-up studies found that female representation in top management had increased to only 6.7% in 1990 and 7.2% in 1992. Lauzon noted that even these increases were misleading, in that some female executives held positions that were created solely to give a misleading impression of gender integration.

Securities commissions

Lauzon criticized the securities commissions of Ontario and Quebec in 1989, saying that they were well-intentioned but largely ineffective and overly dependent on "self-serving" regulations developed by the Canadian Institute of Chartered Accountants.

Corporate reporting

Lauzon led an academic study in 1990 that argued most Canadian companies did not supply enough information about their financial affairs and social performance in corporate annual reports. He said that only fifty of the approximately three hundred companies his team examined had "acceptable or better than acceptable" reports, covering items such as market and regional analyses, charitable donations, environmental records, and employment statistics. Most companies, he said, reported only "the strict minimum required by law."

"Quebec Inc."

Lauzon has strongly criticized the Quebec government's track record in building a provincial corporate sector. He argued in February 1992 that the province had given away $1.5 billion in tax incentives to create a brokerage industry, with meagre results. In the same year, he accused the Caisse de dépôt et placement du Québec of propping up francophone entrepreneurs with little business experience, who in turn produced minimal financial returns. He has also accused the Caisse of being subject to political manipulation and of making decisions "without foresight or vision."

Lauzon has clarified that he is not against government support for socially beneficial business ventures. Rather, he opposes subsidies that "boost only the bank balance of government-favoured entrepreneurs." In 1993, he called on Quebec to follow Ontario's example and require public disclosure of the salaries and perks of the province's top five public sector executives.

Pulp and paper sector

Lauzon issued a report for Greenpeace in August 1992, arguing that Canada's pulp and paper industry was more prosperous than Canadians had been led to believe. As such, he argued that the sector should not be allowed to escape its financial obligations to clean its environmental pollution. The Canadian Pulp and Paper Association strongly criticized the report, saying that its language was "offensive and unfounded." In 1995, Lauzon issued another report accusing Canadian pulp and paper firms of being much less efficient than their American and Scandinavian counterparts.

Alcohol and tobacco

In 1994, Lauzon released a report arguing that privatizing provincial liquor boards would result in increased levels of alcoholism, higher prices, and more smuggling. He concluded that privatization would compromise government efforts to combat alcoholism. In another study issued the same year, he accused cigarette makers of investing record windfall profits outside of Canada as their domestic clientele died. Saying there was "no worse corporate citizen" than the tobacco industry, he called for higher tobacco taxes in both Canada and the United States of America. Imperial Tobacco responded to Lauzon's report with its own study; one of its conclusions was that the premature death of some smokers yielded savings to the Canadian health sector. Not surprisingly, this statement was widely criticized.

Municipal services

Lauzon issued a critical report about Montreal's parking services in 1996, arguing that a recent decision to privatize the sector had been beneficial for some leading executives and harmful to everyone else. Lauzon wrote that municipal revenues from privatization were less than expected, while drivers were required to pay more in parking rates. The following year, he oversaw a study that argued installing water meters in Montreal houses would be costly and not necessarily provide an environmental benefit.

Pharmaceutical drugs

In mid-1998, Lauzon and Gino Lambert issued a study indicating that brand name drug prices had increased significantly over the last decade, rising from 10.7% of Canadian health spending in 1985 to 14.4% in 1996 and resulting in windfall profits for multinational medical companies. The authors wrote that "while our governments work furiously to cut public expenses in the health sector, the brand-drug industry builds up billions in profits year after year," adding that "government must think seriously of saving money on brand drugs, allowing more for other activities of our collective health-care system that need it greatly." Lauzon and Lambert also criticized the Canadian and Quebec governments for giving extended patent protection and tax breaks to the industry. Lauzon later co-authored a follow-up study in 2002 confirming the same trends; the latter study was cited by Roy Romanow, who was then leading a national committee on the future of Canadian health care. A third study issued by Lauzon in 2006 showed that Canada's pharmaceutical companies had made an average 29% return on investments since 1995, largely due to increased prices.

Banks

In 2004, Lauzon proposed that government agencies such as the post office should provide personal banking services. He argued that this practice would be beneficial to Canadians, both because it would provide increased revenues to the state and because commercial banks were making huge profits at the expense of their customers.

In the same year, he argued that Canada's five major banks had avoided $10 billion in taxes since 1991 via offshore tax havens such as the Cayman Islands. The Montreal Gazette endorsed Lauzon's findings, if not his specific recommendations, and called for the government to close Canada's tax haven loopholes.

Oil and gas sector

In June 1998, Lauzon co-authored a study calling on governments to enforce competition laws in the retail gas sector in order to prevent price gouging. Seven years later, he argued that the Canadian government should nationalize the oil industry; he charged that oil companies were making "immoral profits on the back of this society" and said that the resource had to be repatriated.

Tax burdens

Lauzon released a report entitled "The Other Fiscal Imbalance" in 2006, drawing attention to an ongoing shift in the national tax burden from corporations to the general population.

=== Criticism of specific corporations ===
Lauzon has issued several reports targeting the practices of specific corporations. In 1988, he wrote that the Campeau Corporation had paid no income taxes on profits amounting to $243 million between 1980 and 1985. He criticized existing laws that he said favoured such companies, by allowing them to make write-offs against depreciation on office property and keep the unpaid taxes as part of their cash flow. Later in the same year, he criticized an $83.3 million Quebec government loan to Noranda on the grounds that its terms provided $62.5 million in tax savings for the company without requiring that the actual loan ever be repaid.

Lauzon issued a study for Greenpeace in 1990, arguing that Canadian Pacific Forest Products, the owner of Canada's most polluting mill, had made $550 million in profits over the last two years but was investing only $18 million to develop environmental technology.

In September 1990, Lauzon issued a seventy-two-page document on the Repap corporation, accusing it of using questionable accounting practicies to understate its debt, overstate its profits, and minimize its taxes. The company's chairman rejected the charges and said that Lauzon had used "incomplete and inaccurate" information to prepare his report. Lauzon defended his work, although he acknowledged that some of statements in the final draft were unprofessional and should have been left out. (Repap's finances were later given extremely low ratings by the Canadian Bond Rating Service, although a representative for that group said that Lauzon's study was not a factor in its decision.)

In 1991, Lauzon accused Videotron of a poor record of accomplishments in spite of extensive financial support from the provincial government. Two years later, he wrote that the Canadian Marconi Company was shifting funds and operations out of Quebec despite receiving $195 million in government aid over the previous decade.

In 1992, Lauzon issued a report accusing Audrey Resources Inc. of systematically misrepresenting its finances. Some former company representatives responded by launching a $750,000 libel suit against Lauzon and the Université du Québec à Montréal. Lauzon refused to retract his charges, although he noted that he did not accuse Audrey of breaking any laws. Newspaper reports do not indicate how the matter was resolved.

=== Praise for specific corporations ===
Lauzon offered praise for Hydro-Québec in December 1991, saying that the company had provided extensive social information in its annual report. The crown corporation won first place for four consecutive years in a financial and social disclosure competition started by Lauzon.

== Other writings ==
In 1999, Lauzon and Martin Poirier issued a report arguing that the Quebec government and the Roman Catholic Church made substantial profits by falsely certifying thousands of Quebec orphans as mentally ill during the 1940s and 1950s. The authors made a conservative estimate that religious groups received $70 million in subsidies (measured in 1999 dollars) by claiming the children as "mentally deficient", while the government saved $37 million simply by having one of its orphanages redesignated from an educational institution to a psychiatric hospital. A representative of a religious order involved with the orphanages accused the authors of making "false assertions".

== Critical assessment ==
Lauzon's work has been criticized by several business figures. In 1989, an executive of Standard Life in Montreal said that he was overly dependent on annual reports and that such documents do not always provide a full assessment of a company's social activities. As against this, a representative of the Professional Corporation of Certified Management Accountants in Quebec argued in the same period that Lauzon had played a prominent role in changing Quebec's corporate culture and forcing companies to seriously address social matters.

== Political activities ==
Lauzon has supported the principle of Quebec sovereignty but has also criticized prominent sovereigntist politicians of the Parti Québécois in very strong terms. In 2005, he said, "We are very lucky we did not become independent with Lucien Bouchard, Bernard Landry, Joseph Facal. They would have separated us from Canada and the day after we would have become a protectorate of the United States, like Puerto Rico."

He endorsed Paul Cliche, a former Parti Québécois member running as an independent, in a 2001 provincial by-election in Mercier. Cliche won support from several left-wing activists and finished a strong third.

Lauzon himself ran for the New Democratic Party in the Montreal riding of Outremont in the 2006 Canadian federal election and was considered a star candidate for the party. He argued in this campaign that he was tired of Quebec's traditional dichotomy between federalism and sovereigntism, and was quoted as saying, "What I believe first is in a federalism of compassion, of equity, of sharing. Now it's time for the independence, the sovereignty of Canada." He received 17.20% of the vote, finishing third against Liberal cabinet minister Jean Lapierre.

== Selected bibliography ==
- L'Homme d'affaires québécois des années 80 (1983, with Michel G. Bédard and Gilbert Tarrab)
- Information sur les effets des variations de prix (1984)
- Privatisations : l'autre point de vue (with others) (1998?)

== Electoral record ==
2006 Canadian federal election: Outremont
Party	Candidate	Votes	%	±%	Expenditures
Liberal	Jean Lapierre	14,282	35.18	−5.76	$69,816
Bloc Québécois	Jacques Léonard	11,778	29.01	−4.24	$63,590
New Democratic	Léo-Paul Lauzon	6,984	17.20	+3.14	$26,625
Conservative	Daniel Fournier	5,168	12.73	+6.76	$73,991
Green	François Pilon	1,957	4.82	+0.53	$425
Independent	Eric Roach Denis	101	0.25		$431
Progressive Canadian	Philip Paynter	94	0.23		none listed
Marxist–Leninist	Linda Sullivan	88	0.22	−0.09	none listed
Independent	Yan Lacombe	85	0.21		none listed
Independent	Xavier Rochon	34	0.08		$572
Independent	Régent Millette	22	0.05		none listed
Total valid votes		40,593	100.00		
Total rejected ballots		282	0.69		
Turnout		40,875	60.78	−4.65	
Electors on the lists		67,253			

Source: Official Results, Elections Canada and Financial Returns, Elections Canada.
