= Nathalie Palladitcheff =

French business executive

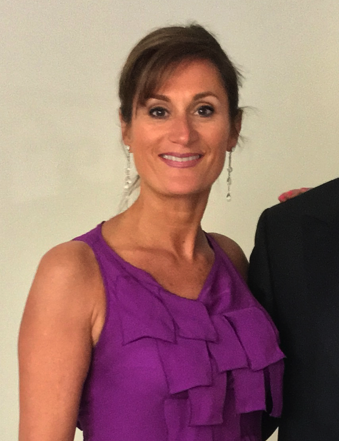
- Nathalie Palladitcheff
- Born: October 13, 1967 (age 58)
- Education: Burgundy School of Business
- Occupations: President & CEO, Ivanhoé Cambridge
- Children: 3
- Awards: Chevalier of the Ordre national du mérite (Knight of the National Order of Merit).

Nathalie Palladitcheff (born October 13, 1967) is a French business executive who was the president and the first female chief executive officer of Ivanhoé Cambridge, the real estate subsidiary of the Caisse de dépôt et placement du Québec (CDPQ), which owns C$77 billion in real estate assets.

Based in Montreal, Canada, Palladitcheff joined the firm in August 2015 as executive vice president and chief financial officer. She succeeded Daniel Fournier as president in March 2018, and as CEO in October 2019 after he retired as chairman and chief executive officer. Nathalie Palladitcheff stepped down as CEO of Ivanhoé Cambridge in April 2024, as the company merged with its parent the CDPQ.

Nathalie Palladitcheff is an active promoter of the Environmental, Social, and Governance (ESG) criteria. For example, since January 2021, Ivanhoe Cambridge has tied the remuneration of all its employees, including executives, to emissions reduction goal as it commits to cut net carbon emissions to zero by 2040. Later in February 2021, Nathalie Palladitcheff has been chosen to become Chair of FREY’s Mission Committee. FREY is France’s first "mission-driven" REIT, which has adopted a "mission statement" together with social, societal and environmental goals. She is also advocating to convert office buildings to residential, sustainably with investment in technology. As she likes to state: “The best building for the planet is the building that you don’t build”.

In June 2023, Nathalie Palladitcheff received the Pierres d’Or award in the “Professional of the Year” category, one of the most prestigious award in the real estate industry in France.
