= Damien Hétu =

Canadian politician (1926-2010)

Damien Hétu (October 24, 1926 – February 15, 2010) was a Canadian politician. Hétu served as mayor of Sainte-Agathe-des-Monts, Quebec on two occasions and was a Liberal member of the National Assembly of Quebec from 1985 to 1989.

== Early life and career ==
Hétu was born in Sainte-Agathe-des-Monts and received his early education in the town. He trained as an electrician and radio/television technician, and in 1952 he began working as an electrician and entrepreneur in his home community. He successfully campaigned for a local sports center, which was opened in the 1970s.

Hétu was a municipal councillor in Sainte-Agathe-des-Monts from 1959 to 1965 and was the community's mayor from 1970 to 1974. In the same period, he was an organizer for both the Liberal Party of Canada and the Quebec Liberal Party. He ran for the Quebec legislature in the 1981 provincial election and lost to incumbent Parti Québécois cabinet minister Jacques Léonard in Labelle.

== Legislator ==
Hétu was elected to the national assembly on his second attempt in the 1985 provincial election. The Liberal Party won a majority government in this election under Robert Bourassa's leadership, and Hétu served for the next four years as a government backbencher. A 1988 newspaper report indicates that he had one of the best attendance records in the legislature, missing fewer than one per cent of recorded votes.

He was defeated by Léonard a second time when seeking re-election in 1989.

== Return to municipal politics ==
Hétu was re-elected as mayor of Sainte-Agathe-des-Monts in 1990 and served until 1994. He presided over a water boil advisory for the community in 1992, due to concerns about contamination from lead pipes.

== Death ==
Hétu died in February 2010, after an extended illness.

== Electoral record ==
1989 Quebec general election: Labelle
Party	Candidate	Votes	%	±%
Parti Québécois	Jacques Léonard	16,897	54.80	
Liberal	Damien Hétu	13,938	45.20	
Total valid votes		30,835	100.00	
Rejected and declined votes		971		
Turnout		31,806	74.07	
Electors on the lists		42,938		

1985 Quebec general election: Labelle
Party	Candidate	Votes	%	±%
Liberal	Damien Hétu	15,197	50.36	+11.60
Parti Québécois	Yvon Cormier	12,690	42.05	−15.65
Progressive Conservative	Bernard Campeau	1,546	5.12	
Parti indépendantiste	Diane Cloutier	603	2.00	
Christian Socialist	Diane Chevrier	143	0.47	
Total valid votes		30,179	100.00	
Rejected and declined votes		347		
Turnout		30,526	73.89	−6.04
Electors on the lists		41,314		

1981 Quebec general election: Labelle
Party	Candidate	Votes	%	±%
Parti Québécois	Jacques Léonard	17,596	57.70	
Liberal	Damien Hétu	11,822	38.76	
Union Nationale	Roger Labonté	1,079	3.54	–
Total valid votes		30,497	100.00	
Rejected and declined votes		246		
Turnout		30,743	79.93	
Electors on the lists		38,460		
