= Eric Denis =

Canadian documentary film maker and activist

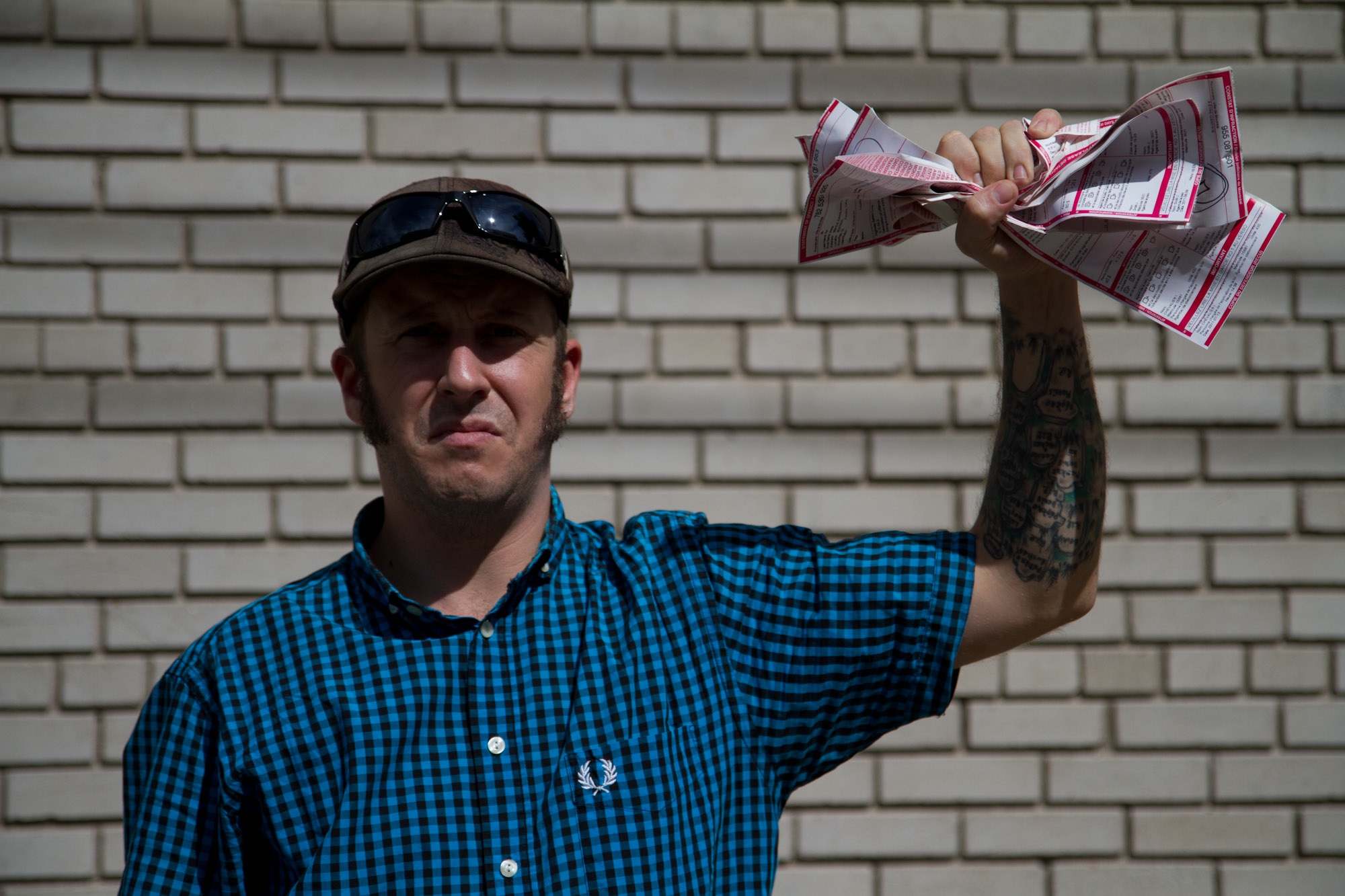
Eric Denis in Les Tickets

Eric Denis better known as Eric "Roach" Denis is a Canadian documentary film maker and activist whose films deal with social justice, and particularly homelessness.

== Earlier Life ==
Denis was born in Grenville, Quebec. At age 9, his parents divorced and he went on to live with his mother in Hawkesbury, Ontario. After a brief stay with his father, he was put in a juvenile detention centre because he had been hooked on smoking marijuana. At the age of 14, he escaped from the center he was assigned to and started living as a street kid in the streets of Montreal acquiring addiction to hard drugs in the process as a teenager.

Denis assuming the pseudonym "Roach" became a squeegee teenager sleeping in parks, abandoned cars and refuge centers and was arrested many times. It was during these troubled times that he met EyeSteelFilm's director Daniel Cross who was planning to shoot a documentary film about squeegees and Roach offered to tell his part of the story by film thus beginning his career as a documentary filmmaker and activist.

== Movie career ==
Denis began first by documenting his own life as an autobiography, entitled "RoachCam" as part of the acclaimed S.P.I.T.: Squeegee Punks in Traffic directed by Daniel Cross and Mila Aung-Thwin.

Using cinema as a motivation to get cleaned up, "Roach" has gone on to make two other films with EyeSteelFilm: RoachTrip is his directorial debut film. It is autobiographical take about the invisible punk highway from Quebec to the orchards of British Columbia. In August 2004, the film went on to win the second prize in the "Portraits" category" in Tver festival in Russia.

He recently directed Punk the Vote!, again an autobiographical documentary which saw Roach and fellow punker Starbuck run for Canadian federal elections against Liberal incumbent Jean Lapierre, in an informative, hilarious take on Canadian politics punk-rock style. Eric Denis didn't win the election. Roach had 101 votes. His main goal in this film was to give the homeless the opportunity to vote.

From his works also is the short film ZLEA: Zone Libre d'Expression Anarchiste (translated as Free Zone for Anarchist Expression) in 2005.

Denis' films have played in festivals such as Hot Docs Canadian International Documentary Festival, in Tver (Russia), DocsDF (Mexico City) and Nemo (Paris).

Tickets is about the police tactic of issuing large numbers of minor infractions against homeless people in order to “evict” them from public areas, eventually relocating them to prison. This new film examines the social, financial and human cost of criminalizing Montreal's homeless community. By following this issue from the Ministry of Justice, to the streets, and finally to prison, the film aims to investigate what is happening to the rights of society's already alienated street community. It was shown at Festival du Nouveau Cinema, FICFA, RVCQ and other festivals. Denis has also did some conferences on the subject around the province of Quebec.

== Filmography ==
- S.P.I.T.: Squeegee Punks in Traffic
- RoachTrip
- Punk the Vote!
- ZLEA: Zone Libre d'Expression Anarchiste
- Les Tickets

== See also ==
- List of youth detention incidents in Canada
- Punk the Vote!
- RoachTrip
- S.P.I.T.: Squeegee Punks in Traffic

== Electoral record ==
2006 Canadian federal election: Outremont
Party	Candidate	Votes	%	±%	Expenditures
Liberal	Jean Lapierre	14,282	35.18	−5.76	$69,816
Bloc Québécois	Jacques Léonard	11,778	29.01	−4.24	$63,590
New Democratic	Léo-Paul Lauzon	6,984	17.20	+3.14	$26,625
Conservative	Daniel Fournier	5,168	12.73	+6.76	$73,991
Green	François Pilon	1,957	4.82	+0.53	$425
Independent	Eric Roach Denis	101	0.25		$431
Progressive Canadian	Philip Paynter	94	0.23		none listed
Marxist–Leninist	Linda Sullivan	88	0.22	−0.09	none listed
Independent	Yan Lacombe	85	0.21		none listed
Independent	Xavier Rochon	34	0.08		$572
Independent	Régent Millette	22	0.05		none listed
Total valid votes		40,593	100.00		
Total rejected ballots		282	0.69		
Turnout		40,875	60.78	−4.65	
Electors on the lists		67,253			

Source: Official Results, Elections Canada and Financial Returns, Elections Canada.
