= Hélène Robert =

Hélène Robert may refer to:

- Hélène Robert (politician)
- Hélène Robert (actress)

== See also ==
- Hélène Robert-Mazel, French composer, pianist, singer and teacher
