= Quebec Liberal Party candidates in the 1970 Quebec provincial election =

The Quebec Liberal Party won seventy-two out of one hundred and eight seats in the 1970 Quebec provincial election, winning a majority government under Robert Bourassa's leadership. Information about these candidates may be found on this page.

== Candidates ==
=== Labelle: Benoît Robidoux ===
Benoît Robidoux received 2,922 votes (21.65%), finishing second against Union Nationale incumbent Fernand Lafontaine.
