= Guy Tardif =

Canadian politician (1935–2005)

Guy Tardif (French pronunciation: [ɡi taʁdif]; May 30, 1935 – May 24, 2005) was a Canadian politician. He was a Parti Québécois member of the National Assembly of Quebec from 1976 to 1985 and was a cabinet minister in the governments of René Lévesque and Pierre-Marc Johnson. He is the grandfather of professional gridiron football guard Laurent Duvernay-Tardif.

== Early life and career ==
Tardif was born in Montreal, received his early education in that city, and later studied at the University of Ottawa and the Université de Montréal. He was a Royal Canadian Mounted Police (RCMP) officer from 1955 to 1960 and was a lecturer and administrative assistant for the Montreal Police Service from 1963 to 1970.

He received a master's degree in criminology in 1966 and earned a Ph.D. from the Université de Montréal in 1974 for a thesis submission entitled Police et politique au Québec. Tardif also wrote several articles on police and prison issues and was a consultant for various government departments and commissions before launching his own career in politics.

== Legislator and cabinet minister ==
Municipal affairs minister

Tardif was elected to the Quebec legislature in the 1976 provincial election, defeating one-term Liberal incumbent Jean Bienvenue in the Montreal division of Crémazie as the Parti Québécois won a historic majority government across the province. He was appointed to René Lévesque's first cabinet as minister of municipal affairs on November 26, 1976.

In 1978, Tardif and André Ouellet, the urban affairs minister in Pierre Trudeau's federal cabinet, engaged in a public dispute as to which level of government was responsible for delays in proceeding with planned housing construction. The journalist William Johnson argued in a The Globe and Mail editorial that the Quebec Housing Corporation was at fault, notwithstanding Tardif's statements to the contrary. Tardif had a better relationship with Ouellet's successor Elmer MacKay, who was a member of Joe Clark's short-lived government in 1979–80.

Tardif ended a provincial trusteeship over the Montreal suburb of St. Leonard in 1979. The trusteeship had been imposed by the previous Liberal government in 1975, following allegations of municipal corruption. He also allowed the town of Buckingham, which had been merged into a single entity by the previous government, to dissolve itself into four distinct municipalities following a referendum.

Notwithstanding his criticism of Tardif in other respects, William Johnson also credited him with "[taking] the politics out of municipal financing by establishing formula grants."

Minister of planning and housing

Lévesque shuffled his cabinet on November 6, 1980, and appointed Tardif as the minister of state responsible for planning and the minister responsible for housing.

In December 1980, Tardif was forced to defend his hiring of Luc Cyr, two years earlier, to oversee a program of repairs for low-rent housing. Cyr, an associate of PQ organizers, later put his son and brother-in-law on the payroll; the president of the housing corporation overturned this arrangement once he discovered it. Tardif defended Cyr's appointment, saying that it was normal for such contracts not to go to tender because of the difficulties in predicting expenses. He added the government had cancelled the contract in September 1980 once officials had identified irregularities. This notwithstanding, Tardif responded to criticisms by convening a legislative committee to investigate charges of nepotism and patronage within the corporation.

Minister of housing and consumer affairs

During the 1981 provincial election, Tardif joined Premier Lévesque to promise a new housing loan program that would provide financial benefits to homeowners with one or more young children. He was narrowly re-elected in Crémazie as the PQ won a second majority across the province. After a cabinet shuffle on April 30, 1981, he retained his position as the minister responsible for housing and was given additional responsibilities as the minister responsible for consumer protection. On June 18, after enabling legislation was passed, he was officially styled as minister of housing and minister of consumer protection.

Tardif introduced the government's promised housing loan program, in a somewhat modified form, in August 1981. The opposition Liberals charged that the amended legislation did not adequately protect homeowners affected by high mortgage rates.

As consumer affairs minister, Tardif was once again in regular contact with André Ouellet, who by this time was the minister of consumer and corporate affairs in the re-elected government of Pierre Trudeau. In September 1981, he criticized Ouellet's plan to strengthen the competition laws that protected consumers and small businesses. Tardif said that he did not object to the intention of the bill, but argued that the matter fell under Quebec's jurisdiction rather than that of the federal government.

In 1982, Tardif expressed the PQ government's opposition to any transfer of flights from Dorval International Airport in Montreal to Mirabel International Airport outside of the city. He argued that the change, if imposed by the federal government, would have a devastating impact on Quebec's economy.

During the same period, Tardif convinced construction unions to make concessions and contractors to accept lower profits in order to construct fifty thousand units of low-income housing in a project called Corvée-Habitation. Many years later, PQ leader Bernard Landry cited the project as one of Tardif's greatest accomplishments.

1984 PQ crisis

In 1984, the Parti Québécois went through an internal crisis over the nature of its support for Quebec sovereignty. Some leading party figures, including René Lévesque, wanted to moderate the party's position, while others favoured a more hardline indépendantiste approach. Tardif was initially seen as close to the latter group; in early November 1984, he joined twelve other cabinet ministers in signing a manifesto that called for the party to re-affirm its commitment to Quebec independence. However, when several indépendantiste ministers quit the government later in the month, Tardif did not join them.

Lévesque shuffled his cabinet after the indépendantiste resignations and appointed Tardif as transport minister on November 27, 1984.

Transport minister

In April 1985, Tardif said that a provincial agency had purchased a twenty-two per cent interest in the Montreal-based airline Nordair. He added that his government's plan was to facilitate a merger of Nordair and Quebecair, a French-language firm owned by the same provincial agency. The company that owned a controlling interest in Nordair responded that it was opposed to the purchase, and would fight it.

Tardif also announced in August 1985 that Quebec was ending its freeway tolls, after twenty-one years of paying off the original cost of Montreal's four-lane highways.

In the fall of 1985, Tardif asked Velo Quebec to organize a cycling tour on new paths in the city's east end. The resulting event eventually became known as the Tour de l'ile de Montreal; in later years, it became the largest participatory cycling tour in the world.

Johnson ministry

René Lévesque announced his resignation as premier of Quebec and Parti Québécois leader in June 1985. There was some speculation that Tardif would be a candidate in the race to succeed him, but this did not occur. Tardif initially supported Bernard Landry's candidacy, and then declined to back another candidate after Landry withdrew from the contest. Pierre-Marc Johnson succeeded Lévesque in October 1985 and kept Tardif in the transport portfolio when he announced his cabinet. In early November, he reached a deal with the federal government to re-open Quebec City's downtown rail line.

Tardif was defeated in the 1985 provincial election, as the Liberal Party was elected with a majority government across the province. He resigned from cabinet with the rest of the Johnson ministry on December 12, 1985.

Graham Fraser has written Tardif was known for his "ferocious work habits" during his time in government, sometimes calling civil servants during the night to discuss office matters.

== After politics ==
Tardif co-founded a company called Le Clos Saint-Denis in 1989, operating a fruit orchard and vineyard. In 1999, he introduced a new brand of ice cider called Pommes de Glace. He also returned to academia in 1989, teaching criminology at the Université de Montréal. The Civic Party of Montreal tried to draft Tardif as a possible mayoral candidate in the 1990 municipal election, but he declined.

He died on May 24, 2005, of pleural mesothelioma, which was apparently caused by asbestos inhalation many years earlier.

== Electoral record ==
1985 Quebec general election: Crémazie
| Party | Candidate | Votes | % |
|---|---|---|---|
| Liberal | André Vallerand | 16,115 | 49.89 |
| Parti Québécois | Guy Tardif | 14,560 | 45.08 |
| New Democratic | Pierre Leduc | 765 | 2.37 |
| Parti indépendantiste | Louise Crépel | 276 | 0.85 |
| Progressive Conservative | Laurence Lemyre | 233 | 0.72 |
| Independent | Carole Caron | 211 | 0.65 |
| Commonwealth of Canada | Christiane Deland | 78 | 0.24 |
| Christian Socialist | Yvan Lauzon | 62 | 0.19 |
| Total valid votes | | 32,300 | |
| Rejected and declined votes | | 596 | |
| Turnout | | 32,896 | 80.03 |
| Electors on the lists | | 41,105 | |

1981 Quebec general election: Crémazie
| Party | Candidate | Votes | % | ±% |
|---|---|---|---|---|
| Parti Québécois | Guy Tardif | 16,938 | 51.46 | |
| Liberal | Gilles Perron | 15,355 | 46.65 | |
| Union Nationale | Richer M. Francoeur | 545 | 1.66 | – |
| Marxist–Leninist | Carolyn Zapf | 80 | 0.24 | |
| Total valid votes | | 32,918 | 100.00 | |
| Rejected and declined votes | | 366 | | |
| Turnout | | 33,284 | 85.85 | |
| Electors on the lists | | 38,768 | | |

1976 Quebec general election: Crémazie
| Party | Candidate | Votes | % | ±% |
|---|---|---|---|---|
| Parti Québécois | Guy Tardif | 16,463 | 50.40 | |
| Liberal | Jean Bienvenue | 11,851 | 36.28 | |
| Union Nationale | Maurice L'Écuyer | 3,449 | 10.56 | – |
| Ralliement créditiste | Léopold Mercier | 461 | 1.41 | |
| Parti national populaire | Gilles Legault | 277 | 0.85 | |
| Communist | Claire da Sylva Demers | 83 | 0.25 | |
| coalition NPDQ - RMS | André Lavallée | 80 | 0.24 | |
| Total valid votes | | 32,664 | 100.00 | |
| Rejected and declined votes | | 561 | | |
| Turnout | | 33,225 | 89.09 | |
| Electors on the lists | | 37,293 | | |
