= 2009 Mont-Saint-Michel municipal election =

The 2009 Mont-Saint-Michel municipal election took place on November 1, 2009, to elect a mayor and councillors in Mont-Saint-Michel, Quebec. Incumbent mayor Roger Lapointe was re-elected to another term without opposition.

== Results ==
2009 Mont-Saint-Michel municipal election: Mayor
Candidate	Votes	%
(x)Roger Lapointe	acclaimed	.

2009 Mont-Saint-Michel election, Councillor, District One
Candidate	Total votes	% of total votes
(incumbent)André Trudel	161	55.71
Claude de Villers	128	44.29
Total valid votes	289	100.00

2009 Mont-Saint-Michel election, Councillor, District Two
Candidate	Total votes	% of total votes
Jean-François Charron	214	73.04
(incumbent)Jean-Claude Rivest	79	26.96
Total valid votes	293	100.00

2009 Mont-Saint-Michel election, Councillor, District Three
Candidate	Total votes	% of total votes
(incumbent)Éric Lévesque	accl.	.

2009 Mont-Saint-Michel election, Councillor, District Four
Candidate	Total votes	% of total votes
(incumbent)Aurèle Cadieux	173	58.25
Oliver Lebret	124	41.75
Total valid votes	297	100.00

2009 Mont-Saint-Michel election, Councillor, District Five
Candidate	Total votes	% of total votes
Pascal Bissonnette	accl.	.

2009 Mont-Saint-Michel election, Councillor, District Six
Candidate	Total votes	% of total votes
André-Marcel Évéquoz	accl.	.

Source: Résultants 2009, Affaires municipales, Régions et Occupation du territoire Québec.
