= Punk the Vote! =

- Theatrical release poster
- Directed by: Eric "Roach" Denis
- Produced by: EyeSteelFilm and Canal D
- Starring: Roach and Starbuck
- Distributed by: EyeSteelFilm
- Release date: 2006
- Running time: 73 minutes
- Country: Canada
- Language: French

Punk the Vote! (in French Punk le vote!) is a 73-minute 2006 Canadian documentary about the Canadian elections, and a hilarious and at the same time a critical take on Canadian politics punk-rock style, when two punks decide to run as independent candidates for the Canadian elections. The film is directed by Eric "Roach" Denis of EyeSteelFilm, a Montreal-based documentary production company. It was produced by EyeSteelFilm in association with Canal D Canadian specialty channel specializing in documentaries.

The film was shown in 2006 at the Festival du Nouveau Cinéma in Montreal and in 2007 at Les Rendez-vous du cinéma québécois in Québec City and Montréal.

== Synopsis ==
Roach and Starbuck, two hardcore punks from Montreal, try to form their own political party, but run out of time due to Canada's electoral process. Instead, they decide to campaign for political office as independent candidates in a rich Montreal district called Outremont. As they hit the campaign trail in one of Canada's wealthiest communities, each wants to do it his own way. While Roach proposes to reform the "rotting electoral system" as he calls it, Starbuck's punk rock performance art is designed to shock the electorate into waking the up. Roach mounts a media campaign proposing proportional representation; Starbuck campaigns door-to-door wearing a leather cape and a dildo, telling voters: "If you like it up the a**, vote Liberal!".

== See also ==
- S.P.I.T.: Squeegee Punks in Traffic
- RoachTrip
