= Hélène Robert (politician) =

Canadian politician

Hélène Robert (born October 12, 1945) is a Canadian farmer, administrator and politician. Robert was a Parti Québécois member of the National Assembly of Quebec from 1994 to 2007.

== Early life and career ==
Robert was born in Sainte-Scholastique, Quebec. She received a teaching degree from the Collège Ignace-Bourget in 1965 and taught at the École secondaire Georges-Vanier and other Quebec schools for most of the period between 1965 and 1994. She also owned an apple farm from 1977 to 1988 and was active with local agricultural organizations. From 1990 to 1992, she chaired the administrative council of the École secondaire Georges-Vanier.

== Political career ==
Robert ran as a Parti Québécois candidate in Deux-Montagnes in the 1989 provincial election. She centered her local campaign around environmental issues while also highlighting her support for Quebec nationalism. Near the end of the election, she said, "My grandmother was a Canadian, my mother was a French-Canadian and I'm a Quebecoise. I want to make sure that my daughter, too, is a Quebecoise." On election day, she was narrowly defeated by Liberal candidate Jean-Guy Bergeron. Robert later served as president of the Parti Québécois's association in Deux-Montagnes; she offered support to party leader Jacques Parizeau in 1992 when his leadership was questioned by some in the party.

She was elected to the Quebec legislature in the 1994 provincial election as the Parti Québécois won a majority government under Parizeau's leadership. On September 26, 1994, she was appointed as the government's regional delegate for the Laurentides. This was not a ministerial position, although she had some oversight powers on regional development projects.

Lucien Bouchard succeeded Parizeau as premier on January 29, 1996, and eliminated the government's regional delegate positions. Robert was re-assigned as regional secretary for the Laurentides and parliamentary assistant to the minister responsible for the Laurentides, positions that she held until October 28, 1998. She was re-elected without difficulty in the 1998 provincial election and afterwards served as a government backbencher.

Robert was narrowly re-elected to a third term in the 2003 provincial election as the Parti Québécois was defeated by the Liberal Party under Jean Charest. She served as an opposition member for the next four years and did not seek re-election in 2007.

== After politics ==
Robert visited Benin in 2010 in a mission sponsored by UPA Développement International to support two farmers organizations in the country.

== Electoral record ==
2003 Quebec general election: Deux-Montagnes
Party	Candidate	Votes	%	±%
Parti Québécois	Hélène Robert	12,432	39.04	-7.99
Liberal	Marc Lauzon	12,099	37.99	+7.02
Action démocratique	Éric Duhaime	6,907	21.69	+0.95
UFP	Julien Demers	408	1.28	+0.98 (Note: Results taken from Socialist Democracy.)
Total valid votes		31,846	98.28	–
Total rejected ballots		557	1.72	+0.58
Turnout		32,403	74.37	-2.92
Electors on the lists		43,571	–	–

1998 Quebec general election: Deux-Montagnes
Party	Candidate	Votes	%
Parti Québécois	Hélène Robert	21,831	47.03
Liberal	Robert Fragasso	14,378	30.97
Action démocratique	Jacques Hébert	9,628	20.74
Bloc Pot	Marc-André Roy	324	0.70
Socialist Democracy	Luc Charlebois	141	0.30
Equality	Ovid da Silva	121	0.26
Total valid votes		46,423	100.00
Rejected and declined votes		529	
Turnout		46,952	81.08
Electors on the lists		57,907	

1994 Quebec general election: Deux-Montagnes
Party		Candidate	Votes	%
	Parti Québécois	Hélène Robert	20,742	48.34
	Liberal	Francine Labelle	15,053	35.08
	Action démocratique	Sylvie Allaire	6,523	15.20
}	Development	Georges Robert	305	0.71
	Natural Law	Alain Gerard Antinori	286	0.67
Total valid votes			42,909	100.00
Rejected and declined votes			932	
Turnout			43,841	83.28
Electors on the lists			52,644	

1989 Quebec general election: Deux-Montagnes
Party	Candidate	Votes	%
Liberal	Jean-Guy Bergeron	15,656	46.48
Parti Québécois	Hélène Robert	15,141	44.95
Equality	Rudolf Neumayer	2,449	7.27
United Social Credit	Georges Vaudrin	435	1.29
Total valid votes		33,681	100.00
Rejected and declined votes		1,061	
Turnout		34,742	75.98
Electors on the lists		45,723	
