= OOCRE =

Owner-occupied commercial real estate (also known as owner-occupied CRE or OOCRE) is a form of commercial real estate where an operating entity (corporations, partnerships, LLCs, etc...) will own the property with the purpose of running business operations out of it, instead of leasing from a separate entity.

== Property types ==
OOCRE is typically a commercial property of one of the following types:

- Office (office buildings and/or office condos)
- Industrial (including warehouses and manufacturing facilities)
- Retail
- Shopping center
- Agricultural
- Hotel and motel
- Senior housing / assisted living facilities
- Health care
- Special purpose

Unimproved land, multifamily homes, and residential income homes are not recognized by most banks or lending institutions as OOCRE.

== Financing ==
OOCRE is distinct from commercial investment property and is viewed differently. In investment properties, the building generates cash flow which services the debt with banks. The duration, dollar amount, and credit quality of the tenants determine in part a bank's willingness to lend. In OOCRE lending, the cash flow to service the bank debt is typically driven by the cash flow of the underlying business. Therefore, in lieu of reviewing Leases, a bank reviews the health of the business through financial analysis.

Typical bank loan terms on an OOCRE:

- Amortization Period are typically 15, 20 or 25 years.
- Term period 5 to 25 years, if it does not match the amortization period, it is considered a balloon payment mortgage
- Rates: most banks prefer to lend at variable rates (typically tied to Prime Rate or LIBOR). Some banks offer fixed rates for a term period.
- Prepayment penalties are very common, yield maintenance is one of the most typical forms of prepayment penalty. Moreover, some institutions charge flat fees and percentages that typically range from 1% to 5% of the unpaid principal if the loan is paid in full or partially by more than the scheduled payment by the amortization period.
