= Parti citron candidates in the 1994 Quebec provincial election =

The Parti citron was a novelty political party that ran ten candidates in the 1994 Quebec provincial election, none of whom were elected. Information about these candidates may be found on this page.

== Candidates ==
=== Labelle: Bruno Fortier ===
Bruno Fortier received 342 votes (1.28%), finishing third against Parti Québécois incumbent Jacques Léonard. He is not to be confused with another Bruno Fortier who later served as Quebec's envoy to New York City.
