= Frank G. Binswanger Sr =

American businessman

Frank G. Binswanger Senior was an American businessman, developer and civic leader, founder of Binswanger Real Estate, co-founder of SIOR (Society of Industrial and Office Realtors) and former chairman of the Civic Center Board of Philadelphia. He was known best for his business and charitable work.

== Personal life ==
Frank Sr. was born in Philadelphia on December 11, 1902, and had six siblings. Frank Sr. and his wife Elizabeth had three sons, Frank Jr, Robert and John. Frank Sr. died July 6, 1991, after suffering from cancer, heart disease and pneumonia.

== Career ==
Binswanger Sr. founded the now international real estate company, Binswanger, in 1931. He grew the company from a single office space in Philadelphia to span multiple countries, and the company today has stayed within the family and is led by Frank Sr's great-grandson's Frank Jr and David. Frank Sr. helped to develop Philadelphia landmarks such as the Penn Center and the Independence mall building, and also served as the Commissioner of Fairmount Park.

== Philanthropy and awards ==
Frank Sr. served as general chairman of the Federation's Allied Jewish Appeal Campaign. He was also a supporter of his alma mater, Wesleyan University, and funded the Binswanger Prize for Excellence in Teaching. The Binswanger Prize is given each year to three scholar-teachers who demonstrate and are responsible for the distinct approach of the university to liberal arts education. In 1970, Frank Sr. was named the Delaware Valley Council Citizen of the year In 1978, he was presented with the William Penn Award, for his contributions to the region to improve it, as well as his philanthropic work.
