= Laurentides-Labelle (provincial electoral district) =

Coordinates: 46.219°N 74.500°W

Quebec electoral district

Defunct provincial electoral district
- Legislature: National Assembly of Quebec
- District created: 1972
- District abolished: 1980
- First contested: 1973
- Last contested: 1976

Laurentides-Labelle (French pronunciation: [lɔʁɑ̃tid labɛl]) was a provincial electoral district in the Laurentides region of Quebec that elected members to the National Assembly of Quebec. It was created for the 1973 Quebec general election, from parts of the Labelle electoral district. Its final election was in 1976, before it was replaced by the recreated Labelle.

== Members of the National Assembly ==
1. Roger Lapointe, Liberal (1973–1976)
2. Jacques Léonard, Parti Québécois (1976–1981)
