= RoachTrip =

RoachTRip
- Directed by: Eric "Roach" Denis
- Produced by: EyeSteelFilm
- Starring: Roach and Smash
- Distributed by: EyeSteelFilm
- Release date: 2003
- Running time: 46 minutes
- Country: Canada
- Language: English

RoachTrip is a 2003 Canadian documentary about two punks, Roach and his friend Smash down the invisible punk highway across Canada. It captures their goal to escape the streets of Montreal as they cross 5,000 km (3,107 mi) to reach the "promised land" of British Columbia's Okanagan Valley.

The film is an autobiographical coming-of-age chronicle told in an intimate point-of-view style, directed by Eric "Roach" Denis of EyeSteelFilm, a Montreal-based documentary production company, as a continuation of the autobiographical journey that he had started by being portrayed as one of the main characters in Daniel Cross award-winning documentary S.P.I.T.: Squeegee Punks in Traffic where Eric Denis contributed with his RoachCam. The film RoadTrip became the directorial debut film of Eric "Roach" Denis.

== Synopsis ==
RoachTrip starts by waving the black flag in the House of Commons and ends wandering lost in the desert. In between is an odyssey down Canada's invisible punk highway in search of something pure and clean. Roach and Smash, two inseparable street buddies from Montreal introduced in 2002 documentary "S.P.I.T." earlier, ping-pong across the country. The same couple are now set loose with RoachCam and the loose mandate of filming the annual Punk migration across Canada.

Camping, fishing, and fruit-picking their way through summer, these two punks are never quite able to leave the city behind. Just beyond the paradise of the Okanagan lies the lure of the streets of Vancouver.

== Festivals ==
The documentary premiered at the FCMM Festival and also screened at the Global Visions Festivals in Edmonton, Alberta, Canada. The film is scheduled for New York Underground Film Festival (aka NYUFF) (New York) NEMO (Paris) and the Images du Nouveau Monde (Quebec City).

== See also ==
- Punk the Vote!
