= Denise Leblanc-Bantey =

Canadian politician

Denise Leblanc-Bantey, also known as Denise Leblanc, was a Canadian politician and a two-term Member of the National Assembly of Quebec.

== Background ==
She was born on December 15, 1949, in L'Étang-du-Nord, Quebec. She made her career in education.

== Member of the legislature ==
Leblanc ran as a Parti Québécois (PQ) candidate in the 1976 election against Liberal incumbent Louis-Philippe Lacroix in the provincial district of Îles-de-la-Madeleine and won. She served as a parliamentary assistant from 1976 to 1981.

== Cabinet Member ==
She was re-elected in the 1981 election. She was appointed to the Cabinet in 1981 and served as Minister of the Civil Service until 1984 and as Minister responsible for the Status of Women from 1983 to 1984.

== PQ Crisis ==
During the Parti Québécois Crisis of 1984, Leblanc resigned from the Cabinet and crossed the floor. She sat as an Independent by November 17, 1984. She did not run for re-election in the 1985 election.

She was the President of a Quebec sovereignty group known as the Rassemblement démocratique pour l'indépendance in 1985 and 1986.

== Death ==
Leblanc died on February 8, 1999, in Montreal due to natural causes.

== Footnotes ==
National Assembly of Quebec
Preceded by Louis-Philippe Lacroix (Liberal)	MNA for Îles-de-la-Madeleine; 1976–1985	Succeeded by Georges Farrah (Liberal)
