= Union Nationale candidates in the 1981 Quebec provincial election =

The Union Nationale fielded 121 candidates in the 1981 Quebec provincial election, none of whom were elected. The party, which had governed Quebec for most of the period from 1936 to 1970, dissolved shortly thereafter.

Some of the party's candidates have standalone biography pages; information about others may be found here.

== Candidates ==
=== Iberville: Yvon Boulanger ===
Yvon Boulanger received 2,498 votes (7.30%), finishing third against Parti Québécois incumbent Jacques Beauséjour.

There was a candidate named Yvon V. Boulanger in a 1995 Quebec by-election for the House of Commons of Canada, although it is not clear if this was the same person.

=== Labelle: Roger Labonté ===
Roger Labonté received 1,079 votes (3.54%), finishing third against incumbent Parti Québécois cabinet minister Jacques Léonard.
