= Hélène Robert-Mazel =

French composer

Hélène Robert-Mazel (active 1832-1857) was a French composer, pianist, singer and teacher. She composed songs, a cantata, and educational pieces for children. Her works were listed through at least opus 9.

Little is known about Robert-Mazel other than her concert appearances and publications. She performed as a pianist and singer, frequently using her own compositions, at the Strasbourg Theater; "Mrs. Long's" residence in Berkeley Square in London; and at the Salons de Pape and other venues in Paris. Contemporary reviews noted that she ". . . achieved incredible feats as a singer, as well as a piano player and composer."

Robert-Mazel set texts by several authors to music and collaborated (probably in performance) with the brothers Alexandre and Théophile Tilmant (cello and violin), the horn player Louis-François Dauprat, and the singer Laure Cinti-Damoreau. She settled in Montpellier, France, around 1850, where she taught voice and piano, mainly to children. Her textbooks for teaching children were frequently reprinted and were highly recommended by the French composer and music critic Adolphe Adam.

Robert-Mazel's works were published by Alexandre Cotelle and Schott Music. They included:

== Books ==
- Guide Musical de L'enfance

== Chamber ==
- L'etoile (arranged for guitar)

== Orchestra ==
- Le Jugement Dernier (cantata)

== Piano ==
- Album (1839)
- L'enthousiasme, opus 9
- Les Souvenirs de Bade
- Six Waltzes, opus 4
- Variations opus 1, 2 and 3

== Voice ==
- "A Mon Pere"
- Album: Ballades, Melodies et Romances (1837; text by Felix Solar)
- Children's Concerts (collection; text by Thérèse Marie Augusta Élie de Beaumont)
- Eight Romances (published as Album de Mlle. H. Robert-Mazel)
- "Garde à toi, Fleurette" (text by Mme. Du Bouchet)
- "Jeanne d'Harvilliers" (text by Felix Solar)
- "L'arabe et Xon Coursier"
- "L'aspect des Bois"
- "L'esprit de Marais" (text by Felix Solar)
- "L'etoile" (text by Felix Solar)
- "L'orage a la Grande Chartreuse" (text by Felix Solar)
- "La Luciole"
- "Le Douanier et le Dogue" (text by Felix Solar)
- "Le Duel" (text by Felix Solar)
- "Le Saule-pleureur!" (text by Paul Ferrier)
- "Les Deux Ames" (text by Felix Solar)
- "Les Deux Captifs" (soprano and alto)
- "Les Deux Etoiles ou les Yeux de Nella!" (text by Auguste Bressier)
- "Les Violettes" (text by Felix Solar)
- "Marie" (text by Felix Solar)
- "Un Souvenir"
