= US Commercial Real Estate Index =

Real estate index

The US Commercial Real Estate Index ("CREI") is an index with a number of sub-Indices that are designed to demonstrate the relative strength of the United States Commercial Real Estate market.

== History ==
In 2014, the US CREI was created by CRE Demographics, LLC, and examines eight economic drivers in order to determine relative market strength.

== Inputs ==
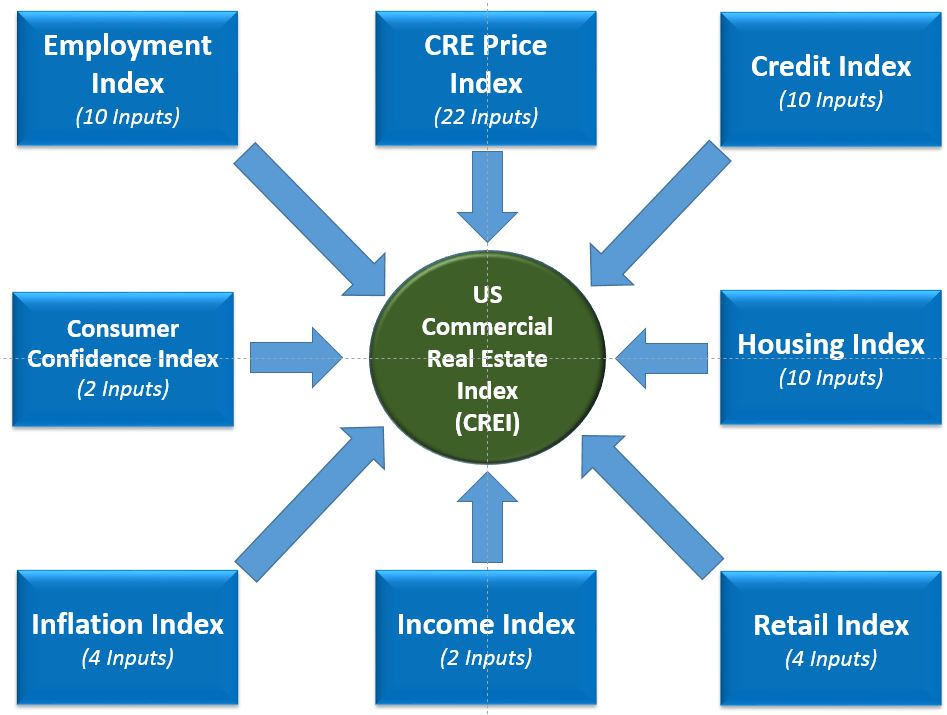
US Commercial Real Estate Index inputs diagram

The economic drivers behind the CREI are isolated into sub-indices that include the Employment Index, Commercial Real Estate Price Index, Credit Index, Consumer Confidence Index, Housing Index, Inflation Index, Income Index, and the Retail Index.

In total, there are over 60 inputs in the US Commercial Real Estate Index all of which come from publicly released data. Most of these come from public sources that are listed below.

- Automatic Data Processing (ADP)
- Bureau of Economic Analysis (BEA)
- The Conference Board
- Federal Housing Finance Authority (FHFA)
- Federal Reserve
- Mortgage Bankers Association
- Mortgage Market Survey
- National Association of Real Estate Investment Trusts (NAREIT)
- National Association of Realtors (NAR)
- New York Stock Exchange
- University of Michigan
- United States Census Bureau
- United States Department of Labor
- United States Treasury
