= Commission scolaire Henri-Bourassa =

The Commission scolaire Henri-Bourassa is a former school division that was located in the Laurentides region of the Canadian province of Quebec.
