= INREV =

Dutch non-profit association

- European Association for Investors in Non-Listed Real Estate Vehicles
- Abbreviation: INREV
- Formation: 2002; 24 years ago
- Type: Nonprofit trade association
- Legal status: Association
- Purpose: Represent members of the non-Listed Real Estate Vehicles industry
- Headquarters: Amsterdam
- Location: Netherlands, Belgium
- Region served: Europe
- Services: INREV Guidelines, Asset Level Index, Fund Level Index, Global Definitions Database
- Members: 504 (2024)
- Official language: English
- CEO: Casper Hesp
- Chair of the Management Board: Lucy Fletcher
- Staff: 35 FTEs (2025)
- Website: inrev.org

The European Association for Investors in Non-Listed Real Estate Vehicles (INREV) is a trade association that provides advocacy services and education for members of the European non-listed real estate fund market. It was incorporated in 2002 and is located in the Netherlands.

INREV states that its goals are to improve the accessibility of non-listed real estate by promoting greater transparency, accessibility, professionalism and standards of best practice. As a pan-European body it represents a platform for the sharing and dissemination of knowledge on the non-listed real estate fund market.

INREV develops research reports and snapshots on key industry topics, analytic tools for performance analysis, benchmarking, fees analysis, and comparison, guidelines and professional standards, public affairs updates on regulations affecting the industry, events, training courses and webinars, and an online members directory.

== History ==
The association was officially launched in 2003 with an event in Wiesbaden with co-founders Pieter Hendrikse, Willem de Geus, and founding Chairman Michiel Olland. In 2008, INREV launched Integrated Guidelines and the association started a full training programme.

In 2010, after the 2008 financial crisis and increases in regulation within the industry, the association stepped up its role in public affairs. In 2012, the association opened a branch office in Brussels to help lobby regulators in the European Union. That same year it initiated a global index in association with two sister bodies, the Asian Association for Investors in Non-Listed Real Estate Vehicles (ANREV) and the American National Council of Real Estate Investment Fiduciaries (NCREIF).

== Services ==
=== Research ===
INREV publishes over a dozen reports annually on topics of interest to investors, fund managers, and financial advisors. Key research publications include: Investment Intentions survey, an annual investment intentions survey to cover European non-listed real estate funds; Fund Managers Survey, which looks at the total real estate assets under management (AUM) for individual fund managers; and, Management Fees and Terms Study, which includes an overview of the fee structures and fee levels of European non-listed real estate funds, and a comparison study which compares Europe with Asia and the US.

=== Industry data ===
The INREV Index is a performance index for European non-listed real estate funds investing 90% or more in Europe, and is listed on Bloomberg. The INREV Index measures annual Net Asset Value based performance on a quarterly and annual basis.

INREV's Vehicles Universe provides an overview of all vehicles active in the three areas covered: European Direct Vehicles, Asian Direct Vehicles, and Fund of Funds for Europe and Asia. The databases comprise key characteristics for all real estate vehicles like the strategy, size, allocation and contact details as well as other characteristics.

=== Professional standards ===
The INREV Guidelines provide fund managers and institutional investors with an integrated set of principles, guidelines and recommendations (including tools and examples) for governance and information provision in relation to non-listed real estate vehicles. Supporting the INREV Guidelines are: due diligence questionnaires (DDQ) for fund managers, and for fund of funds and multi-managers, to streamline fund information ahead of a fund’s launch; corporate governance self-assessment tool, to provide guidance on corporate governance topics such as accountability, transparency and alignment of interest; and, the reporting self-assessment tool, to provide fund managers with an overview of any weaknesses within their fund, and allows investors to see how well funds are conforming to relevant guidelines.

Other professional standards tools include: Standard Data Delivery Sheet (SDDS) for quarterly reporting, which captures the most essential quantitative data investors say they would like to receive from their managers on a quarterly basis; and, a standard non-disclosure agreement (NDA) to replace the wide variety of NDAs currently being used in the industry, decreasing the time required to review the various NDAs and increase overall efficiency.

=== Public affairs ===
INREV prepares briefing papers on a range of regulatory issues affecting the non-listed real estate industry, such as the EU Alternative Investment Fund Managers Directive (AIFMD) and Solvency II. It makes available consultation papers from the European Commission and other regulators, and also collaborates with other agencies to develop industry responses to public consultations, and more.
