= Rassemblement démocratique pour l'indépendance =

The Rassemblement démocratique pour l'indépendance (RDI) was a short-lived political movement promoting the cause of Quebec independence. It was started in February 1985 by disgruntled former members of the Parti Québécois (PQ) who objected to the party's decision the previous month to de-emphasize its support for Quebec sovereignty.

== Formation ==
The RDI was initially an informal alliance of Quebec sovereigntists. Former PQ cabinet minister Camille Laurin was chosen as its first president on an interim basis, while other important members and supporters included Gilbert Paquette and Jacques Parizeau. Some RDI members wanted the movement to become a full-fledged political party, while others, including Parizeau, regarded it as simply a temporary organization for supporters of Quebec independence. Those in the latter camp expected that the PQ would be defeated in the 1985 provincial election and expressed hope that the party could later be returned to a sovereigntist focus.

The RDI held its official founding convention at the end of March 1985 and chose former PQ cabinet minister Denise Leblanc-Bantey as its full-time president. The convention did not decide whether or not the RDI would field candidates in the 1985 election, and Parizeau openly argued against this possibility. Leblanc-Bantey announced in May 1985 that the RDI would not field candidates, noting that some of its members had still not severed their ties to the PQ.

Five independent members of the Quebec National Assembly (MNAs) affiliated with the RDI in 1985, although they were not recognized as an official party caucus. The RDI did not support a candidate in the 1985 Parti Québécois leadership election that followed René Lévesque's resignation, although Jean Garon sought to bring RDI members into his leadership campaign.

== Decline ==
The PQ was defeated by the Quebec Liberal Party in the 1985 election. Parizeau argued the following year that the RDI should not become a full-fledged political party, as he anticipated the PQ could become an openly separatist entity again.

Notwithstanding Parizeau's comments, two hundred delegates to a June 1986 RDI convention in Montreal voted almost unanimously to turn the movement into a party. New president Lyne Marcoux said that the RDI would no longer "play a phantom role in politics" and would hold negotiations with other sovereigntist organizations. A leadership convention was tentatively scheduled for the spring of 1987. Bernard Landry attended the conference as an observer, but later said that he would remain a member of the PQ rather than joining the RDI.

In the event, the RDI never fielded a candidate in an election. Pierre-Marc Johnson resigned as PQ leader in 1987, and Parizeau was chosen as his successor. The PQ subsequently re-confirmed its support for Quebec sovereignty, and most RDI members returned to the fold. The RDI was largely dormant by this time, and by 1988 it was described by the Montreal Gazette as defunct.
