= Commercial property =

Buildings or land intended to generate a profit

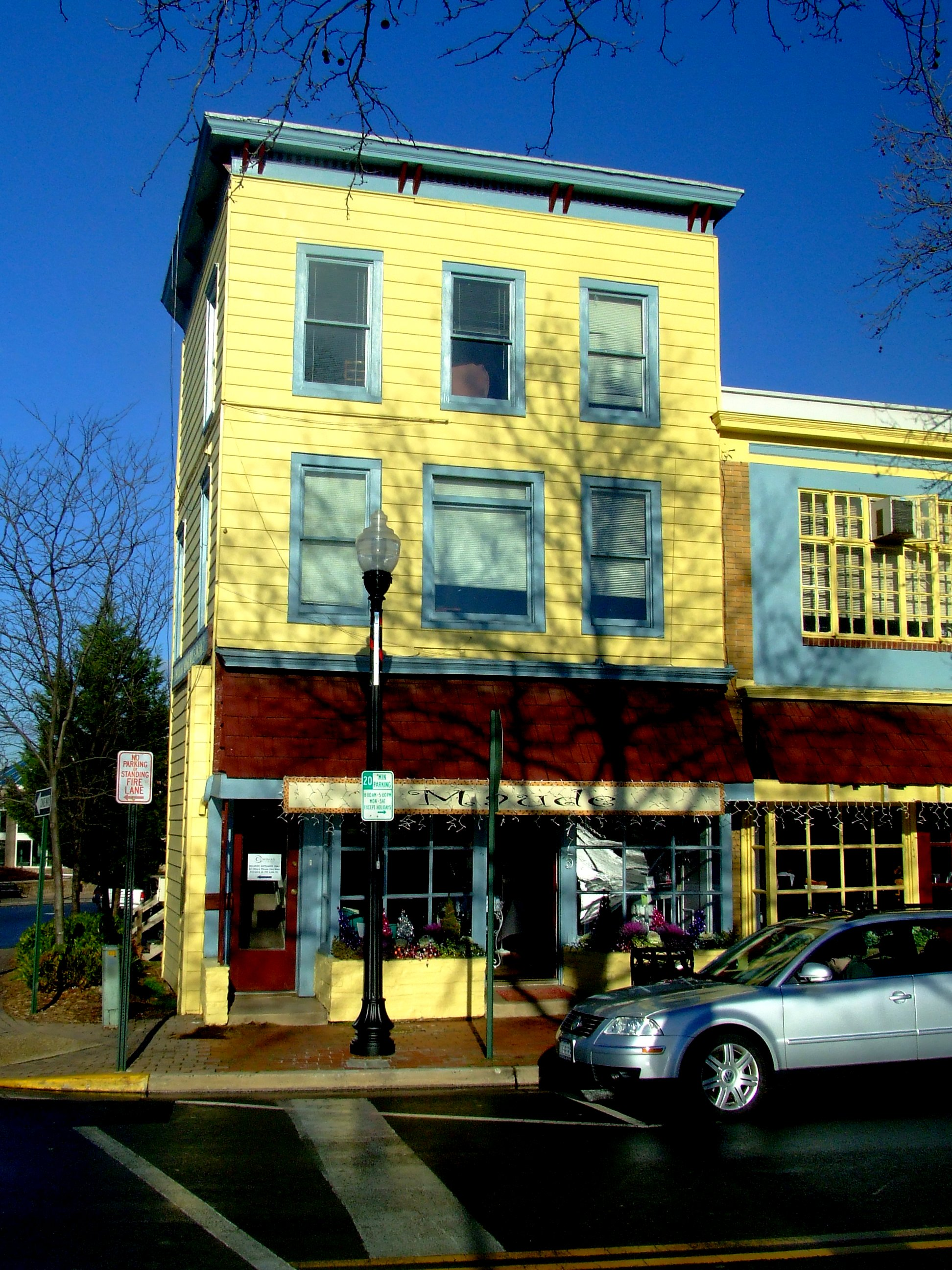
A commercial office/retail building

Commercial property, also called commercial real estate, is real estate (buildings or land) used for conducting commerce, such as selling products or providing services, and intended to generate a profit through business operations, capital gains or rental income. Commercial property includes office buildings, medical centers, hotels, malls, retail stores, multifamily housing buildings, farm land, warehouses, and garages. In many U.S. states, residential property containing more than a certain number of units qualifies as commercial property for borrowing and tax purposes.

Commercial buildings are buildings that are used for commercial purposes, and include office buildings, warehouses, and retail buildings (e.g. convenience stores, 'big box' stores, and shopping malls). In urban locations, a commercial building may combine functions, such as offices on levels 2–10, with retail on floor 1. When space allocated to multiple functions is significant, these buildings can be called multi-use. Local authorities commonly maintain strict regulations on commercial zoning, and have the authority to designate any zoned area as such; a business must be located in a commercial area or area zoned at least partially for commerce.

== Types of commercial property ==
Commercial real estate is commonly divided into six categories:

1. Office buildings – This category includes single-tenant properties, small professional office buildings, downtown skyscrapers, and everything in between.
2. Retail Shops/Restaurants – This category includes pad sites on highway frontages, single tenant retail buildings, inline multi-tenant retail, small neighborhood shopping centers, larger community centers with grocery store anchor tenants, lifestyle centers that blend both indoor and outdoor shopping, "power centers" with large anchor stores such as Best Buy, PetSmart, OfficeMax, and Shopping Malls that usually house many indoor stores.
3. Multifamily residential – This category includes apartment complexes or high-rise apartment buildings. Generally, anything larger than a fourplex is considered commercial real estate.
4. Land – This category includes investment properties on undeveloped, raw, rural land in the path of future development. Or, infill land with an urban area, pad sites, and more.
5. Industrial - This category includes warehouses, large R&D facilities, cold storage or cold chain properties, and distribution centers.
6. Miscellaneous – This catch all category would include any other nonresidential properties such as hotel, hospitality, medical, and self-storage developments, as well as many more.

Categories of Commercial Real Estate
Category	Examples
Hospitality	hotels, motels, public houses, bars, restaurants, cafes, diners, stadiums, sports venues, truck stops, nightclubs, amusement parks, movie studios, movie theaters
Retail	retail stores, convenience stores, big-box stores, grocery stores, supermarkets, shopping malls, shops, showrooms
Office	office buildings, serviced offices
Healthcare	medical centers, hospitals, nursing homes, clinics, dispensaries
Multifamily (apartments)	multifamily residential housing buildings, student housing or dormitory
Educational	cram schools, schools, colleges, universities
Industrial	factories, machine shops, warehouses, workshops, automobile repair shops
Agricultural	farms, fields, orchards, ranches, barns, stables, dairy farms, pig farms, poultry farms, fish farms

Of these, only the first five are classified as being commercial buildings. Residential income property may also signify multifamily apartments.

== Investment ==
The basic elements of an investment are cash inflows, outflows, timing of cash flows, and risk. The ability to analyze these elements is key in providing services to investors in commercial real estate.

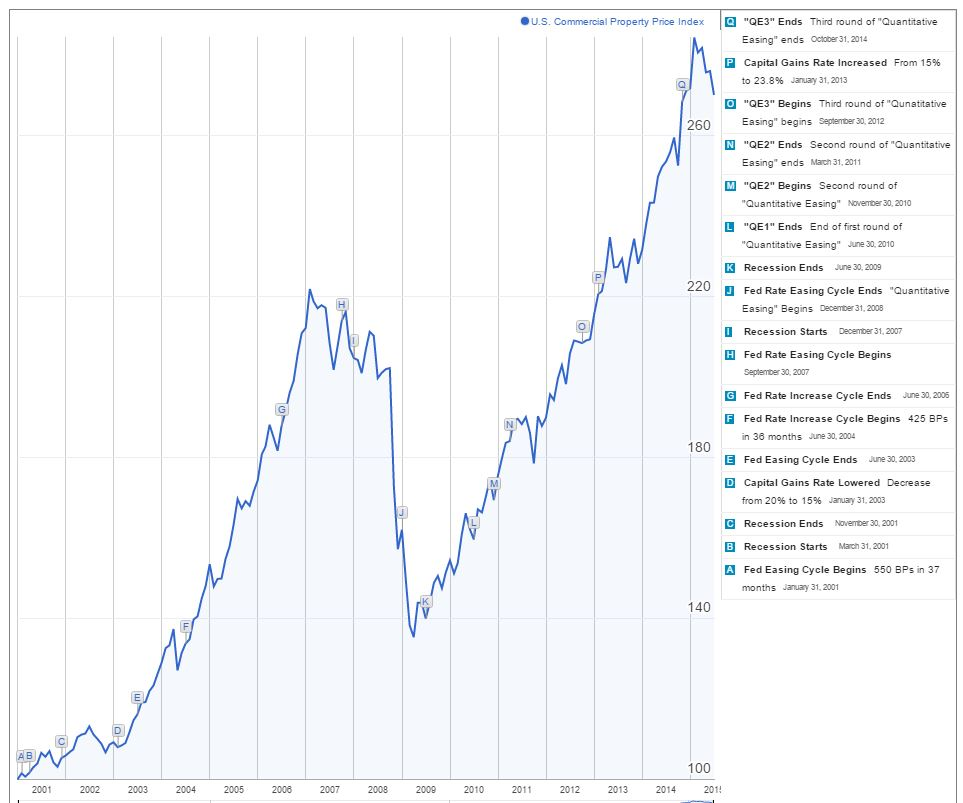
Graph showing the increase in price of commercial real estate in the US.

Cash inflows and outflows are the money that is put into, or received from, the property including the original purchase cost and sale revenue over the entire life of the investment. An example of this sort of investment is a real estate fund.

Cash inflows include the following:

- Rent
- Operating expense recoveries
- Fees for car parking, vending, services, etc.
- Proceeds from sale
- Tax benefits
- Depreciation
- Tax credits (e.g., historical)

Cash outflows include:

- Initial investment (down payment)
- All operating expenses and taxes
- Debt service (mortgage payment)
- Capital expenses and tenant leasing costs
- Costs upon sale

The timing of cash inflows and outflows is important to know in order to project periods of positive and negative cash flows. Risk is dependent on market conditions, current tenants, and the likelihood that they will renew their leases year-over-year. It is important to be able to predict the probability that the cash inflows and outflows will be in the amounts predicted, what is the probability that the timing of them will be as predicted, and what the probability is that there may be unexpected cash flows, and in what amounts they might occur.

The total value of commercial property in the United States was approximately $6 trillion in 2018. The relative strength of the market is measured by the US Commercial Real Estate Index which is composed of eight economic drivers and is calculated weekly.

According to Real Capital Analytics, a New York real estate research firm and subsidiary of MSCI, more than $160 billion of commercial properties in the United States are now in default, foreclosure, or bankruptcy. In 2024, office leasing volume rose to its highest level since 2020, but roughly 60% of active office leases went into effect prior to the pandemic. In Europe, approximately half of the €960 billion of debt backed by European commercial real estate is expected to require refinancing in the next three years, according to PropertyMall, a UK‑based commercial property news provider. Additionally, the economic conditions surrounding future interest rate hikes; which could put renewed pressure on valuations, complicate loan refinancing, and impede debt servicing could cause major dislocation in commercial real estate markets.

However, the contribution to Europe's economy in 2012 can be estimated at €285 billion according to EPRA and INREV, not to mention social benefits of an efficient real estate sector. It is estimated that commercial property is responsible for securing around 4 million jobs across Europe.

As of April 2025, commercial real estate confidence experienced its sharpest drop since the COVID-19 pandemic amid the Trump Administration's latest tariff policies, with positive sentiment falling from 126.5% in the latter half of 2024 to 87.9%, according to the 1Q 2025 Board of Governors Sentiment Index.

== Commercial property transaction process (deal management) ==
Typically, a broker will market a property on behalf of the seller. Brokers representing buyers or buyers' representatives identify property meeting a set of criteria set out by the buyer. Types of buyers may include an owner-user, private investor, acquisitions, capital investment, or private equity firms. The buyer or its agents will perform an initial assessment of the physical property, location and potential profitability (if for investment) or adequacy of property for its intended use (if for owner-user).

If it is determined the prospective investment meets the buyer's criteria, they may signal their intent to move forward with a letter of intent (LOI). Letters of Intent are used to outline the major terms of an offer in order to avoid unnecessary costs of drafting legal documents in the event the parties do not agree to the terms as drafted. Once a Letter of Intent is signed by both parties, a purchase and sale agreement (PSA) is drafted. Not all commercial property transactions utilize a Letter of Intent although it is common. A PSA is a legal agreement between the seller and a single interested buyer which establishes the terms, conditions and timeline of the sale between the buyer and seller. A PSA may be a highly negotiated document with customized terms or may be a standardized contract similar to those used in residential transactions.

Once a PSA is executed, the buyer is commonly required to submit an escrow deposit, which may be refundable under certain conditions, to a title company office or held by a brokerage in escrow. The transaction moves to the due diligence phase, where the buyer makes a more detailed assessment of the property. Purchase and sale agreements will generally include clauses which require the seller to disclose certain information for buyer's review to determine if the terms of the agreement are still acceptable. The buyer may have the right to terminate the transaction and/or renegotiate the terms, often referred to as "contingencies". Many purchase agreements are contingent on the buyer's ability to obtain mortgage financing and buyer's satisfactory review of specific due diligence items. Common due diligence items include property financial statements, rent rolls, vendor contracts, zoning and legal uses, physical and environmental condition, traffic patterns and other relevant information to the buyer's purchase decision specified in the PSA. In competitive real estate markets, buyers may waive contingencies in order to make an offer more appealing to a buyer. The PSA will usually require the seller to provide due diligence information to the seller in a timely manner and limit the buyer's time to terminate the deal based on its due diligence review findings. If the buyer terminates the transaction within the due diligence timeframe, the escrow deposit is commonly returned to the buyer. If the buyer has not terminated the agreement pursuant to the PSA contingencies, the escrow deposit becomes non-refundable and failure to complete the purchase will result in the escrow deposit funds to be transferred to the seller as a fee for failure to close. The parties will proceed to close the transaction in which funds and title are exchanged.

When a deal closes, post-closing processes may begin, including notifying tenants of an ownership change, transferring vendor relationships, and handing over relevant information to the asset management team.

== Empty commercial property ==
In April 2009, the UK government established a form of non-commercial leasing for empty commercial properties known as a "meanwhile lease", also referred to as a "meanwhile use lease" (MUL), which aims "to encourage the temporary occupation of empty town centre retail premises by non-commercial occupiers". A set of template leases was made available to enable property owners and tenants to agree a form of lease for temporary occupation. Rents are not charged, or they are low, so that charities, voluntary organisations, learning providers and local artists can occupy the property. No security of tenure is provided so the property can easily be returned to commercial use when the opportunity arises. Loan covenants and debt overhang can contribute to rental vacancy rates.

== See also ==
- Corporate real estate
- Class A office space
- Commercial Information Exchange
- Estoppel certificate, a document used in
- International real estate
- Owner Occupied Commercial Real Estate
- Real estate
- Real estate investing
- Real estate economics
