= André Vallerand =

Canadian politician (1940–2026)

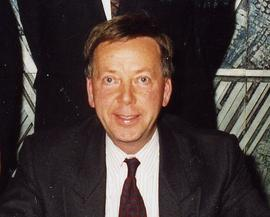
Vallerand in 1991

André Vallerand (French pronunciation: [ɑ̃dʁe valʁɑ̃]; June 9, 1940 – August 3, 2026) was a Canadian administrator, businessman and politician. Vallerand served in the National Assembly of Quebec from 1985 to 1994 and was a cabinet minister in the governments of Robert Bourassa and Daniel Johnson.

== Early life and career ==
Vallerand was born in Quebec City. He held a bachelor's degree (1967) and a master's degree (1970) in economic sciences from Concordia University and lectured in economics at several Quebec universities from 1970 to 1981. He was an economic consultant at A. Vallerand et Associés Inc. from 1971 to 1977 and subsequently worked for the group SNC from 1977 to 1979. Between 1979 and 1985, he was president of the Montreal Chamber of Commerce and executive vice-president and director-general of the Montreal District Chamber of Commerce. In the latter capacity, he supported Montreal's candidacy to host the United Nations's international centre for genetics and biotechnology and lobbied for improvements to the city's telecommunications sector.

He offered qualified support for the Quebec government's white paper on taxation in January 1985, describing it as a "step in the right direction" but calling for further structural changes in favour of the corporate sector. He supported the government's proposal to eliminate family allowances. Later in the year, he announced the Chamber of Commerce's support for a large-scale hydro-electricity scheme proposed by Robert Bourassa, then the leader of Quebec's opposition Liberal Party.

== Provincial politics ==
Vallerand was a star candidate for the Quebec Liberal Party in the 1985 Quebec provincial election and was narrowly elected in the northern Montreal division of Crémazie over incumbent Parti Québécois cabinet minister Guy Tardif. The Liberal Party won a majority government in this election, and Vallerand was appointed to Bourassa's cabinet on December 12, 1985, as minister responsible for small and medium-sized businesses.

Minister responsible for small business

Shortly after his appointment, Vallerand said that his priorities would include simplifying government regulations, ensuring easier access for Quebec businesses to capital markets, and increasing aid for export ventures. In February 1986, he estimated that small businesses were creating two-thirds of new jobs in Quebec City and Montreal, and called for an "enterprise zone" to be created in Montreal's east end to compensate for job losses in the industrial sector. The following month, Premier Bourassa appointed Vallerand and fellow minister Daniel Johnson to draft a plan for an industrial zone in the region.

He organized a conference in Quebec City in March 1987 that was designed to improve ties between the government and Quebec's small businesses. Later in the year, he announced that Quebec would work toward streamlining some aspects of its existing business regulations. Generally, he argued for changes in Quebec's labour laws to reflect a more pro-business position.

Minister responsible for international affairs

Following a cabinet shuffle on June 23, 1988, Vallerand was appointed minister responsible for international affairs. This was a junior portfolio; Vallerand worked under Paul Gobeil, Quebec's minister of international relations.

Vallerand did not serve in this position for very long. In December 1988, several Anglophone members of Bourassa's cabinet resigned to protest the government's handling of Quebec's language laws. Vallerand was promoted to a full cabinet portfolio to fill one of the resulting vacancies, becoming minister of supply and services on December 21, 1988.

Minister of Supply and Services

Vallerand held the supply and services portfolio for just under one year. In August 1989, he announced that Laval, Quebec's second-largest city, would finally receive its own courthouse by May 1991. He later indicated that Montreal's Velodrome would be closed due to a poor economic performance and replaced by a natural museum. Shortly before the 1989 provincial election, he announced a three million dollar initiative for a new Sûreté du Québec building on Montreal's South Shore.

He was re-elected in the 1989 election. On October 11, 1989, he was reassigned as Quebec's minister of tourism.

Minister of Tourism

Vallerand served as tourism minister during the economic downturn of the early 1990s, a time when tourism revenues were further weakened by a strong Canadian dollar and strong promotional efforts from Quebec's regional competitors. He secured one of the few funding increases in Quebec's 1990 austerity budget, increasing the province's funds for tourism advertising from fourteen to twenty million dollars. In the same period, he worked with other provincial ministers to request that the Canadian government exempt tourism packages from Canada's new Goods and Services Tax (GST), a tax that Vallerand opposed in principle. In September 1990, he announced that Quebec would issue a GST rebate on lodging for tourists travelling from outside the province. Vallerand and federal minister Benoît Bouchard agreed on a one hundred million dollar plan to boost the tourism sector in January 1992, though revenues remained low throughout the year.

In late 1990, Vallerand was the Quebec cabinet's primary representative in discussions to keep the financially struggling Montreal Expos baseball team in the city. He initially said that he would prefer the private sector to invest in the team without direct government support, though he added that he would not rule out the latter possibility. Ultimately, Quebec provided an eighteen million dollar low-interest loan to prevent the Expos from moving.

Vallerand ordered the indefinite closure of Olympic Stadium in September 1991, after the collapse of a concrete beam in one of the building's public spaces (the building was almost empty at the time, and no one was injured). He allowed the building to re-open in December, after the government had spent twenty-five million dollars on repairs and compensation for cancelled events.

He was a vocal proponent of public casinos during his tenure as tourism minister, and in April 1992 he helped convince a divided cabinet to approve the Casino de Montréal and another casino project at the Manoir Richelieu in Pointe-au-Pic.

Vallerand supported an initiative to re-launch a train line between Hull and Wakefield in January 1990. The line was officially re-launched in November of the same year.

Minister of Revenue

Vallerand supported Daniel Johnson's successful bid to succeed Robert Bourassa as premier in 1993. When Johnson became premier on January 12, 1994, he appointed Vallerand as minister of revenue.

He worked with the government of Canada to reduce tobacco taxes in early 1994, in a bid to target Quebec's contraband cigarette trade. He also sought to reform Revenu Québec's tax collection practices, which many critics had described as abusive.

In mid-1994, Vallerand imposed sanctions against service stations in the Mohawk communities of Kahnawake and Kanesatake and required that they pay almost four million dollars in back taxes. The communities refused to pay the taxes, and a standoff ensued. In June 1994, a Quebec Superior Court justice ordered the government to lift the sanctions, but also ruled that the communities were required to collect sales tax from non-native customers. Some commentators criticized Vallerand's actions, accusing the Johnson government of exploiting ethnic divisions to increase their popular support. Vallerand rejected this accusation, saying that he was simply trying to prevent unfair competition and recover lost revenues.

Vallerand was not a candidate in the 1994 general election, which the Liberals lost, and formally resigned from cabinet with the rest of the Johnson ministry on September 26, 1994.

== Canadian politics ==
Unlike some of his cabinet colleagues, Vallerand supported the Liberal Party of Canada at the federal level in the 1980s. In the 1988 Canadian federal election, he endorsed Liberal Party incumbent Marcel Prud'homme's bid for re-election. During the constitutional debates of the early 1990s, he supported greater autonomy for Quebec within Canadian federalism.

== After politics ==
In late 1994, Vallerand became president of the EDI World Institute, which specialized in electronic data interchange. In 1997, he was commissioned by the government of Canada to lead a task force studying taxation policy for online businesses. Vallerand's report recommended that Canada provide a clear regulatory framework and not impose additional taxes on electronic commerce.

Vallerand later served as president of the Canadian Institute of Tourism and Electronic Commerce (CITEC), though he was ousted from this position after a fractious board meeting in January 2000. Shortly thereafter, Vallerand contacted the Prime Minister's Office to report allegations that some federal funds granted to CITEC via Human Resources Development Canada had been misappropriated by two other board members; he went public with the controversy later in the same month, saying that it had not been properly addressed by the government. Prime Minister Jean Chrétien rejected this accusation, responding that his office had informed the Royal Canadian Mounted Police (RCMP) "within minutes" of receiving Vallerand's information. In July 2000, following an RCMP investigation, the two board members named by Vallerand were formally charged with theft and fraud.

He was appointed chairman of the board for Advantage Link Inc., a publicly traded computer services company, in August 2001. He was later appointed chairman of the Destination Council of the United Nations World Tourism Organization and as president of the World Centre of Excellence for Destinations. In 2011, he was appointed special advisor on destination management to Taleb Rifai, the secretary-general of the United Nations World Tourism Organization.

Vallerand died on August 3, 2026, at the age of 86.

== Electoral record ==
1989 Quebec general election: Crémazie
Party	Candidate	Votes	%	±%
Liberal	André Vallerand	15,100	50.20	+1.31
Parti Québécois	Lise Dagenais	12,736	42.34	-2.74
Green	Hélène Deschênes	1,385	4.60	–
New Democratic	Jean Denis	496	1.65	-0.72
Commonwealth of Canada	Christiane Deland-Gervais	143	0.48	+0.24
Workers	Claudya Kutowsky	115	0.38	–
Marxist–Leninist	Christine Dandenault	103	0.34	–
Total valid votes		30,078	97.69	–
Total rejected ballots		710	2.31	–
Turnout		30,788	79.13	-0.90
Eligible voters		38,910	–	–
Liberal hold		Swing		+2.04
Source: Official Results, Le Directeur général des élections du Québec.

1985 Quebec general election: Crémazie
Party	Candidate	Votes	%
Liberal	André Vallerand	16,115	49.89
Parti Québécois	Guy Tardif	14,560	45.08
New Democratic	Pierre Leduc	765	2.37
Parti indépendantiste	Louise Crépel	276	0.85
Progressive Conservative	Laurence Lemyre	233	0.72
Independent	Carole Caron	211	0.65
Commonwealth of Canada	Christiane Deland	78	0.24
Christian Socialist	Yvan Lauzon	62	0.19
Total valid votes		32,300	
Rejected and declined votes		596	
Turnout		32,896	80.03
Electors on the lists		41,105	
