= Ralliement créditiste du Québec candidates in the 1976 Quebec provincial election =

The Ralliement créditiste du Québec fielded 109 candidates in the 1976 Quebec provincial election, one of whom, party leader Camil Samson, was elected. Information about these candidates may be found on this page.

== Candidates ==
=== Laurentides-Labelle: Antonio Lemire ===
Antonio Lemire received 1,499 votes (5.35%), finishing fourth against Parti Québécois candidate Jacques Léonard.
