= International real estate =

Cross-border purchase and sale of property

The term international real estate describes a phenomenon that started in the 1980s and kept pace with globalization. The term encompasses real property development, sales and leasing transactions across national borders. International real estate could be viewed as one of the most dynamic branches of real estate although it is, by definition, influenced by fluctuating market value in various sectors between countries, as evidenced by the 2008 financial crisis.

== Types ==
International real estate is best subdivided into two categories: international commercial real estate and international residential real estate. Some examples of international real estate transactions are:

- a citizen of one country purchases a house in another country
- a corporation headquartered in one country purchases or leases an office building in another country
- a corporation or investment group in one country builds a hotel in another country

== International commercial real estate ==
Most international commercial real estate transactions take place between corporations and may involve, lead to, or be a consequence of legal, design, urban planning, engineering, financing, and construction work. From a national government perspective, attracting foreign investment into real estate development projects can be a key priority for increasing country revenue and a key strategy for increasing the availability of national infrastructure and amenities.

Some of the factors leading to the growth in the international commercial real estate sector are:

- the post-war growth in urban development and infrastructure in both developed and developing nations;
- business' evolution toward multi-national business operations;
- the growth in international investment practices enabling investors to look outside their own countries for above average performing investments.

=== The Institutions of Globalization ===
International capital market integration requires institutional help, both through the emergence of investment products catering to international investors, and through reliable information sources that make markets more transparent. The development of public equity and debt real estate market makes it much easier for investors to allocate significant amount of money outside their home market.

The overall growth of the global property share market is helped by the proliferation of tax pass-through structures all over the world. The success of the U.S. REIT market has prompted regulators in many countries to introduce similar-but different named structures. REITs are an important development in the internationalization of property markets.

== International residential real estate ==
Most international residential real estate transactions are generated by individuals purchasing lots or built units (including family homes, apartments, and condominium units). These purchases form the bulk of what is sometimes referred to as the vacation/second home market or residential tourism market.

If a person wishes to initiate international real estate investment for the individual’s or the institution’s portfolio, the person or financial manager may consider multiple avenues. The indirect method of entering international real estate investment may involve passive investment in securities that are based on international real estate collateral or passive investment in international real estate service firms and offices. The direct method of entering international real estate investment may involve total acquisition or partial acquisition of the foreign property.

For developed countries whose GDP per capita is above threshold level, it is calculate the value of institutional-grade real estate is 45% of national GDP, which is consistent with data gathered. However, to determine the size of institutional-grade real estate markets in developing countries adjustments are made because only the more affluent segments of the population in those countries have the wherewithal to use such real estate.

Some of the factors leading to the growth in the international residential real estate sector are:

- the rise in international tourism and travel;
- the baby boomer generation reaching retirement age and looking for more flexible retirement options;
- the increase in available information on the World Wide Web regarding property listings in countries around the world.

== Recent Increase in Chinese Real Estate Investing in the United States ==
In the U.S., the Chinese are now the largest foreign buyers of homes, accounting for $28.6 billion of sales in the 12 months ended March 2015, according to the National Association of Realtors.

There are three major reasons why Chinese are investing in the US real estate market: investment diversification, overseas education of their child and immigration. The Chinese real estate website Juwai.com, part of Juwai IQI, estimates that Chinese real estate holdings abroad totaled $80 billion in 2015 and are expected to balloon to $220 billion by 2020. Chinese investors are interested in commercial projects, residential properties, hotels, golf courses, clubs, land, industrial warehouses, office buildings, and shopping centers. Chinese investors initially were focused mostly on the major gateway cities such as New York City, San Francisco, Los Angeles but are now moving into other cities as well.

== See also ==
- Urban development
