= Minister responsible for the Laurentides =

The Minister responsible for the Laurentides is a ministerial designation in the government of Quebec. The minister who holds this position is responsible for overseeing government matters in the Laurentides region, to the northwest of Montreal, Quebec. It is not a full ministerial portfolio, and it is generally held by a minister who also has other cabinet responsibilities.

The current minister is Nadine Girault, she is also Minister of International Relations and Francophonie; and

Minister of Immigration, Francization and Integration.
