= 1984 Parti Québécois crisis =

The Parti Québécois Crisis of 1984 was one of the most severe internal party crises in Quebec politics.

== Origins ==
In September 1984, Progressive Conservative politician Brian Mulroney became Prime Minister of Canada, with the backing of many Parti Québécois (PQ) supporters. Tensions erupted between the more radical supporters of the PQ–including most of the so-called purs et durs, or hardliners–and the more moderate ones over Premier René Lévesque’s decisions to:

- shift toward a more conciliatory approach with the federal government over constitutional issues (a policy known as beau risque);
- put the promotion of sovereignty on the back burner.

In November 1984, six PQ Members of the National Assembly of Quebec (MNAs) resigned from the Cabinet. They were soon followed by other legislators who crossed the floor to sit as Independents.

== Consequences ==
The PQ's majority in the National Assembly almost completely vanished. It had started the term with 80 MNAs. By the end of the term, it was reduced to only 60 MNAs.

On June 3, 1985, the PQ lost a series of four by-elections, managing to finish third in the district of L'Assomption, behind Progressive Conservative Party of Quebec Leader André Asselin, with only 20% of the vote.

Eventually, the incident resulted in the resignation of Premier René Lévesque. In September 1985, a party leadership election chose Pierre-Marc Johnson, another moderate, as his successor.

However, the PQ lost the 1985 election and by 1987, the party's radical wing pressured Johnson into quitting. Radicals were able to get Jacques Parizeau, one of their own, to take over the leadership of the party.

== Defectors ==
MNA	District	Resignation from Cabinet	Decision to sit as an Independent	Resignation from Legislature	Status following 1985 Election
Pierre de Bellefeuille	Deux-Montagnes	n/a	November 20, 1984	n/a	Defeated as a Parti indépendantiste candidate
Jules Boucher	Rivière-du-Loup	n/a	January 28, 1985	n/a	Did not run for re-election
Louise Harel	Maisonneuve	November 27, 1984	n/a	n/a	Re-elected as a PQ candidate
Camille Laurin	Bourget	November 26, 1984	n/a	January 25, 1985	Did not run for re-election
Denis Lazure	Bertrand	December 4, 1984	n/a	December 4, 1984	Did not run for re-election
Denise Leblanc-Bantey	Îles-de-la-Madeleine	November 26, 1984	November 27, 1984	n/a	Did not run for re-election
Jacques Léonard	Labelle	November 22, 1984	November 27, 1984	May 23, 1985	Did not run for re-election
Gilbert Paquette	Rosemont	November 26, 1984	February 4, 1985	n/a	Did not run for re-election
Jacques Parizeau	L'Assomption	November 22, 1984	n/a	November 27, 1984	Did not run for re-election
Jérôme Proulx	Saint-Jean	n/a	November 22, 1984	n/a	Defeated as a PQ candidate

Members of the Cabinet are indicated with bold fonts.
