= Fernand Lafontaine =

Canadian politician (1922–2010)

Fernand-Joseph Lafontaine

Member of the Legislative Assembly of Quebec for Labelle
- In office 1959–1973
- Preceded by: Pierre Bohémier
- Succeeded by: Roger Lapointe

Personal details
- Born: November 14, 1922 Montreal, Quebec
- Died: June 21, 2010 (aged 87) Sainte-Véronique, Quebec
- Party: Union Nationale

Fernand-Joseph Lafontaine (November 14, 1922 – June 21, 2010) was a Canadian politician and a member of the Legislative Assembly of Quebec.

He was born in Montreal, Quebec and became an engineer.

Lafontaine ran as a Union Nationale candidate in a by-election held on September 16, 1959 in the provincial district of Labelle and won. He was re-elected in the 1960, 1962, 1966 and 1970 elections.

He served as his party's campaign manager from 1963 to 1970.

He was appointed to the cabinet in 1966 and served as minister of public works until 1967 and as minister of highways until 1970. Lafontaine was defeated against Liberal candidate Roger Lapointe in the 1973 election.

He died in Sainte-Véronique, Quebec.
