= Daniel Fournier =

Daniel Fournier is a Canadian businessman in the province of Quebec. He was chairman and chief executive officer of Ivanhoé Cambridge, a real estate subsidiary of Caisse de dépôt et placement du Québec, from June 2010 to October 2019. He has also run for the Canadian House of Commons and written on Canadian federalism.

In 2023 it was announced that OMERS appointed Fournier as executive chairman of the pension plans real estate arm, Oxford Properties Group.

== Early life and education ==
Fournier was raised in Pierrefonds, a suburban community of the Island of Montreal. He has a Bachelor of Arts degree in history from Princeton University and a Bachelor of Arts degree in jurisprudence from Oxford University, where he studied as a Rhodes Scholar. While studying at Oxford, he took a term off to play for the Ottawa Rough Riders football team. He returned to Canada after graduating and became a successful figure in Montreal's real estate sector.

== Private career ==
During the 1980s, Fournier was prominent among a group of young French Canadian entrepreneurs who were very influential in changing the real estate landscape in Montreal. He started his career at leading developer Canderel where he became vice-president. He subsequently launched his own real estate investment firm which redeveloped numerous properties in Quebec, including downtown Montreal's Windsor Hotel, the Ogilvy store and the Ritz-Carlton Montreal.

Prior to joining CDPQ, he was chairman of engineering consulting firm Genivar, now WSP Global, and a member of the board of directors of national retailer Canadian Tire. He was also a Director of the Summit Industrial Income REIT.

In July 2008, he was named executive vice-president and chief investment officer of SITQ, which was then the office real estate subsidiary of the Caisse. In June 2010, he was appointed executive vice-president and president of the Caisse's global real estate group. In 2011, Fournier merged all of the Caisse's real estate subsidiaries and assets into Ivanhoé Cambridge. During his tenure, Ivanhoé Cambridge completed C$100 billion in transactions and delivered an average annual return of 11.8% as at Dec. 31, 2019. Ivanhoé Cambridge grew into one of the world's largest and most respected institutional investors with a globally diversified portfolio, doubling the company's total assets from 31 to 65 Billion C$.

He retired from CDPQ in November 2019, following the successful implementation of his succession plan. Fournier then joined several boards and advisory committees of Quebec-based companies, including Claridge, Simons, Groupe Maurice and BTB REIT.

In 2023, it was announced Fournier would come out of retirement to assumed the role of executive chairman for OMERS real estate arm, Oxford Properties Group.

== Philanthropic career ==
In recent years, he chaired the fundraising campaigns for La Maison du Père, the Lighthouse Children and Families and the Institute for Research in Immunology and Cancer (IRIC). He also co-chaired the $40 million Leading the Way fundraising campaign for Bishop's University and until February 2020, he served as chairman of the board of trustees of McCord Museum Foundation in Montreal. In August 2020, he was appointed Bishop's University's 20th Chancellor.

== Political career ==
In 2006, Fournier ran for office in the Quebec riding of Outremont as a member of the Conservative Party. He finished fourth and gathered about 15% of the vote in an 11-candidate contest.

In 2007, Fournier contributed a chapter to Reconquérir le Canada: Un nouveau projet pour la nation québécoise, a book defending Canadian federalism within Quebec.
