= 31st Quebec Legislature =

The 31st National Assembly of Quebec was the provincial legislature in Quebec, Canada that was elected in the 1976 Quebec general election. It sat for six sessions from 14 December 1976 to 23 December 1976; from 8 March 1977 to 22 December 1977; from 21 February 1978 to 20 February 1979; from 6 March 1979 to 18 June 1980; on 24 October 1980 (one day); and from 5 November 1980 to 12 March 1981. The Parti Québécois led by René Lévesque came to power for the first time, and organized the 1980 Quebec sovereignty referendum, which resulted in a win for the "no" side. The Quebec Liberal Party opposition was led by interim leader Gérard D. Levesque and later by Claude Ryan.

== Seats per political party ==
- After the 1976 elections

Affiliation	Members
Parti Québécois	71
Parti libéral du Québec	26
Union Nationale	11
Ralliement créditiste du Québec	1
Parti national populaire	1
Total	110
Government Majority	45

== Member list ==
This was the list of members of the National Assembly of Quebec that were elected in the 1976 election:

Name	Party	Riding	First elected / previously elected	No. of terms
Jean-Paul Bordeleau	Parti Québécois	Abitibi-Est	1976	1st term
François Gendron	Parti Québécois	Abitibi-Ouest	1976	1st term
Pierre-Marc Johnson	Parti Québécois	Anjou	1976	1st term
Zoel Saindon	Libéral	Argenteuil	1966	4th term
Claude Ryan (1979)	Libéral	Argenteuil	1979	1st term
Jacques Baril	Parti Québécois	Arthabaska	1976	1st term
Adrien Ouellette	Parti Québécois	Beauce-Nord	1976	1st term
Fabien Roy	Parti national populaire (Note: First elected as a Ralliement créditiste)	Beauce-Sud	1970	3rd term
Hermann Mathieu (1979)	Libéral	Beauce-Sud	1979	1st term
Laurent Lavigne	Parti Québécois	Beauharnois	1976	1st term
Bertrand Goulet	Union Nationale	Bellechasse	1976	1st term
Jean-Guy Mercier	Parti Québécois	Berthier	1976	1st term
Gérard D. Levesque	Libéral	Bonaventure	1956	7th term
Patrice Laplante	Parti Québécois	Bourassa	1976	1st term
Camille Laurin	Parti Québécois	Bourget	1970, 1976	2nd term*
Armand Russell	Union Nationale	Brome-Missisquoi	1956, (Note: Shefford) 1976	6th term*
Pierre Paradis (1980)	Libéral	Brome-Missisquoi	1980	1st term
Denis Lazure	Parti Québécois	Chambly	1976	1st term
Marcel Gagnon	Parti Québécois	Champlain	1976	1st term
Denis de Belleval	Parti Québécois	Charlesbourg	1976	1st term
Raymond Mailloux	Libéral	Charlevoix	1962	5th term
Roland Dussault	Parti Québécois	Châteauguay	1976	1st term
Louis O'Neill	Parti Québécois	Chauveau	1976	1st term
Marc-André Bédard	Parti Québécois	Chicoutimi	1973	2nd term
Guy Tardif	Parti Québécois	Crémazie	1976	1st term
Victor Goldbloom	Libéral	D'Arcy-McGee	1966	4th term
Herbert Marx (1979)	Libéral	D'Arcy-McGee	1979	1st term
Pierre de Bellefeuille	Parti Québécois	Deux-Montagnes	1976	1st term
Lise Payette	Parti Québécois	Dorion	1976	1st term
Michel Clair	Parti Québécois	Drummond	1976	1st term
Hubert Desbiens	Parti Québécois	Dubuc	1976	1st term
Denis Perron	Parti Québécois	Duplessis	1976	1st term
Bernard Landry	Parti Québécois	Fabre	1976	1st term
Gilles Grégoire	Parti Québécois	Frontenac	1976	1st term
Michel Le Moignan	Union Nationale	Gaspé	1976	1st term
Michel Gratton	Libéral	Gatineau	1972	3rd term
Rodrigue Tremblay	Parti Québécois	Gouin	1976	1st term
Rodrigue Tremblay	Independent	Gouin	1976	1st term
Jocelyne Ouellette	Parti Québécois	Hull	1976	1st term
Claude Dubois	Union Nationale	Huntingdon	1976	1st term
Claude Dubois	Libéral	Huntingdon	1976	1st term
Jacques Beauséjour	Parti Québécois	Iberville	1976	1st term
Denise Leblanc	Parti Québécois	Îles-de-la-Madeleine	1976	1st term
Noël Saint-Germain	Libéral	Jacques-Cartier	1966	4th term
Henri E. Laberge	Parti Québécois	Jeanne-Mance	1976	1st term
Raymond Garneau	Libéral	Jean-Talon	1970	3rd term
Jean-Claude Rivest (1979)	Libéral	Jean-Talon	1979	1st term
Maurice Bellemare	Union Nationale	Johnson	1944, (Note: Champlain) 1974	9th term*
Camille Picard (1980)	Libéral	Johnson	1980	1st term
Guy Chevrette	Parti Québécois	Joliette-Montcalm	1976	1st term
Claude Vaillancourt	Parti Québécois	Jonquière	1976	1st term
Léonard Lévesque	Parti Québécois	Kamouraska-Témiscouata	1976	1st term
Thérèse Lavoie-Roux	Libéral	L'Acadie	1976	1st term
Jacques Brassard	Parti Québécois	Lac-Saint-Jean	1976	1st term
Marcel Léger	Parti Québécois	LaFontaine	1970	3rd term
Pierre Marois	Parti Québécois	Laporte	1976	1st term
Gilles Michaud	Parti Québécois	La Prairie	1976	1st term
Jacques Parizeau	Parti Québécois	L'Assomption	1976	1st term
Jacques Léonard	Parti Québécois	Laurentides-Labelle	1976	1st term
André Marchand	Libéral	Laurier	1970	3rd term
Jean-Noël Lavoie	Libéral	Laval	1960	6th term
Jean-Pierre Jolivet	Parti Québécois	Laviolette	1976	1st term
Jean Garon	Parti Québécois	Lévis	1976	1st term
Raymond Gravel	Parti Québécois	Limoilou	1976	1st term
Rodrigue Biron	Union Nationale	Lotbinière	1976	1st term
Rodrigue Biron	Independent	Lotbinière	1976	1st term
Rodrigue Biron	Parti Québécois	Lotbinière	1976	1st term
Claude Morin	Parti Québécois	Louis-Hébert	1976	1st term
Robert Burns	Parti Québécois	Maisonneuve	1970	3rd term
Georges Lalande (1979)	Libéral	Maisonneuve	1979	1st term
Fernand Lalonde	Libéral	Marguerite-Bourgeoys	1973	2nd term
Yvon Picotte	Libéral	Maskinongé	1973	2nd term
Yves Bérubé	Parti Québécois	Matane	1976	1st term
Léopold Marquis	Parti Québécois	Matapédia	1976	1st term
Fernand Grenier	Union Nationale	Mégantic-Compton	1966, (Note: Frontenac) 1976	2nd term*
Fabien Bélanger (1980)	Libéral	Mégantic-Compton	1980	1st term
Gérald Godin	Parti Québécois	Mercier	1976	1st term
Guy Joron	Parti Québécois	Mille-Îles	1970, (Note: Gouin) 1976	2nd term*
Julien Giasson	Libéral	Montmagny-L'Islet	1970	3rd term
Clément Richard	Parti Québécois	Montmorency	1976	1st term
John Ciaccia	Libéral	Mont-Royal	1973	2nd term
Serge Fontaine	Union Nationale	Nicolet-Yamaska	1976	1st term
Bryce Mackasey	Libéral	Notre-Dame-de-Grâce	1976	1st term
Reed Scowen (1978)	Libéral	Notre-Dame-de-Grâce	1978	1st term
Georges Vaillancourt	Libéral	Orford	1960	6th term
André Raynauld	Libéral	Outremont	1976	1st term
Pierre Fortier (1980)	Libéral	Outremont	1980	1st term
Jean Alfred	Parti Québécois	Papineau	1976	1st term
Jean Alfred	Independent	Papineau	1976	1st term
Jean Alfred	Parti Québécois	Papineau	1976	1st term
William Shaw	Union Nationale	Pointe-Claire	1976	1st term
William Shaw	Independent	Pointe-Claire	1976	1st term
Jean-Guy Larivière	Libéral	Pontiac-Témiscamingue	1970	3rd term
Michel Pagé	Libéral	Portneuf	1973	2nd term
Jean-Guy Cardinal	Parti Québécois	Prévost	1968, (Note: Bagot (First elected as a Union Nationale)) 1976	3rd term*
Solange Chaput-Rolland (1979)	Libéral	Prévost	1979	1st term
Maurice Martel	Parti Québécois (Note: First elected as a Union Nationale)	Richelieu	1966, 1976	2nd term*
Yvon Brochu	Union Nationale	Richmond	1970, 1976	2nd term*
Alain Marcoux	Parti Québécois	Rimouski	1976	1st term
Jules Boucher	Parti Québécois	Rivière-du-Loup	1976	1st term
John O'Gallagher	Libéral	Robert-Baldwin	1976	1st term
Robert Lamontagne	Libéral	Roberval	1970	3rd term
Gilbert Paquette	Parti Québécois	Rosemont	1976	1st term
Camil Samson	Ralliement créditiste	Rouyn-Noranda	1970	3rd term
Camil Samson	Les Démocrates	Rouyn-Noranda	1970	3rd term
Camil Samson	Libéral	Rouyn-Noranda	1970	3rd term
Lucien Lessard	Parti Québécois	Saguenay	1970	3rd term
Jean-Marc Lacoste	Parti Québécois	Saint-Anne	1976	1st term
Guy Bisaillon	Parti Québécois	Sainte-Marie	1976	1st term
Réal Rancourt	Parti Québécois	Saint-François	1976	1st term
Jacques Couture	Parti Québécois	Saint-Henri	1976	1st term
Fabien Cordeau	Union Nationale	Saint-Hyacinthe	1976	1st term
Claude Charron	Parti Québécois	Saint-Jacques	1970	3rd term
Jérôme Proulx	Parti Québécois	Saint-Jean	1966, 1976	2nd term*
Claude Forget	Libéral	Saint-Laurent	1973	2nd term
Harry Blank	Libéral	Saint-Louis	1960	6th term
Yves Duhaime	Parti Québécois	Saint-Maurice	1976	1st term
Jacques-Yvan Morin	Parti Québécois	Sauvé	1973	2nd term
Richard Verreault	Libéral	Shefford	1973	2nd term
Gérard Gosselin	Parti Québécois	Sherbrooke	1976	1st term
René Lévesque	Parti Québécois	Taillon	1960, (Note: Montréal-Laurier (First elected as a Liberal)) 1976	4th term*
Richard Guay	Parti Québécois	Taschereau	1976	1st term
Élie Fallu	Parti Québécois	Terrebonne	1976	1st term
Denis Vaugeois	Parti Québécois	Trois-Rivières	1976	1st term
Jean-François Bertrand	Parti Québécois	Vanier	1976	1st term
Louise Sauvé-Cuerrier	Parti Québécois	Vaudreuil-Soulanges	1976	1st term
Jean-Pierre Charbonneau	Parti Québécois	Verchères	1976	1st term
Lucien Caron	Libéral	Verdun	1970	3rd term
Charles A. Lefebvre	Parti Québécois	Viau	1976	1st term
George Springate	Libéral	Westmount	1970	3rd term

== Other elected MNAs ==
Other MNAs were elected in by-elections during this mandate

- Reed Scowen, Quebec Liberal Party, Notre-Dame-de-Grâce, July 5, 1978
- Claude Ryan, Quebec Liberal Party, Argenteuil, April 30, 1979
- Jean-Claude Rivest, Quebec Liberal Party, Jean-Talon, April 30, 1979
- Hermann Mathieu, Quebec Liberal Party, Beauce-Sud, November 14, 1979
- Georges Lalande, Quebec Liberal Party, Maisonneuve, November 14, 1979
- Solange Chaput-Rolland, Quebec Liberal Party, Prévost, November 14, 1979
- Herbert Marx, Quebec Liberal Party, D'Arcy-McGee, November 26, 1979
- Pierre Paradis, Quebec Liberal Party, Brome-Missisquoi, November 17, 1980
- Camille Picard, Quebec Liberal Party, Johnson, November 17, 1980
- Fabien Bélanger, Quebec Liberal Party, Mégantic-Compton, Megantic-Compton, November 17, 1980
- Pierre Fortier, Quebec Liberal Party, Outremont, November 17, 1980

== Cabinet Ministers ==
- Prime Minister and Executive Council President: René Lévesque
- Deputy Premier: Jacques-Yvan Morin
- Agriculture: Jean Garon (1976–1979)
  - Agriculture, Fisheries and Food: Jean Garon (1979–1981)
- Labour and Workforce: Jacques Couture (1976–1977), Pierre-Marc Johnson (1977-1980), Pierre Marois (1980–1981)
  - Public Works and Provisioning: Lucien Lessard (1976–1977), Jocelyne Ouellette (1977–1981)
- Public Office: Denis De Belleval (1976–1979), François Gendron (1979–1981)
- Cultural Affairs: Louis O'Neill (1976–1978), Denis Vaugeois (1978–1981)
- Cultural Development: Camille Laurin (1977–1980)
  - Cultural and Science Development: Camille Laurin (1980–1981)
- Immigration: Jacques Couture (1976–1980), Gérald Godin (1980–1981)
- Social Affairs: Denis Lazure
- Social Development: Pierre Marois (1977–1980), Lise Payette (1980–1981)
- Status of Women : Lise Payette (1976–1981)
- Education: Jacques-Yvan Morin (1976–1980), Camille Laurin (1980–1981)
- Youth, Recreation and Sports: Claude Charron (1977–1979)
- Tourism, Hunting and Fishing: Lucien Lessard (1976–1979)
  - Recreation, Hunting and Fishing: Lucien Lessard (1979–1981)
- Transportation: Lucien Lessard (1976–1979), Denis De Belleval (1979–1981)
- Communications: Louis O'Neill (1976–1979), Denis Vaugeois (1979–1980), Clément Richard (1980–1981)
- Municipal Affairs: Guy Tardif (1976–1980), Jacques Léonard (1980–1981)
- Environment: Marcel Léger (1977–1981)
- Energy: Guy Joron (1977–1979)
- Lands, Forests and Natural Resources: Yves Bérubé (1976–1979)
  - Energy and Resources: Yves Bérubé (1979–1981)
- Intergovernmental Affairs: Claude Morin
- Parliamentary and electoral reform: Robert Burns (1977–1979)
  - Electoral reform: Marc-André Bedard (1979–1981)
  - Parliamentary Affairs: Claude Charron (1979–1981)
- Industry and Commerce: Rodrigue Tremblay (1976–1979)
  - Industry, Commerce and Tourism: Yves Duhaime (1979–1981)
- Planning: Jacques Leonard (1977–1980), Guy Tardif (1980–1981)
- Consumers, Cooperatives and Financial: Lise Payette (1976–1979), Guy Joron (1979–1980), Pierre Marc Johnson (1980)
  - Housing: Guy Tardif (1980–1981)
- Justice: Marc-André Bedard
- Finances and President of the Treasury Board: Jacques Parizeau
- Revenu: Jacques Parizeau (1976–1979), Michel Clair (1979–1981)
- Economic Development: Bernard Landry (1977–1981)

== New electoral districts ==
A significant electoral map reform took place in 1980 and was effective for the 1981 general elections. The number of seats went from 110 to 122.

The following electoral districts were created:

- Bertrand (in Montérégie; not the modern Bertrand, which is in Laurentides)
- Chapleau
- Chomedey
- Groulx
- Joliette
- La Peltrie
- Laval-des-Rapides
- Marie-Victorin
- Marquette
- Nelligan
- Nicolet
- Pontiac
- Rousseau
- Rouyn-Noranda–Témiscamingue
- Ungava
- Vachon
- Viger
- Vimont

The following electoral districts disappeared:

- Joliette-Montcalm
- Laurentides-Labelle
- Laval
- Pointe-Claire
- Pontiac-Témiscamingue
- Rouyn-Noranda
