= 33rd Quebec Legislature =

Quebec provincial legislature (1985-1988)

The 33rd National Assembly of Quebec was the provincial legislature in Quebec, Canada that was elected in the 1985 Quebec general election and sat from December 16, 1985, to March 8, 1988 (first session) and from March 8, 1988, to August 9, 1989 (second session). The Quebec Liberal Party led by Robert Bourassa was the governing party, while the Parti Québécois, led by Pierre-Marc Johnson and later Jacques Parizeau, was the official opposition.

== Seats per political party ==
- After the 1985 elections

Affiliation	Members
Parti libéral du Québec	99
Parti Québécois	23
Total	122
Government Majority	76

== Member list ==
This was the list of members of the National Assembly of Quebec that were elected in the 1985 election:

Name	Party	Riding	First elected / previously elected	No. of terms
Raymond Savoie	Libéral	Abitibi-Est	1985	1st term
François Gendron	Parti Québécois	Abitibi-Ouest	1976	3rd term
Pierre-Marc Johnson	Parti Québécois	Anjou	1976	3rd term
René Serge Larouche (1988)	Libéral	Anjou	1988	1st term
Claude Ryan	Libéral	Argenteuil	1979	3rd term
Laurier Gardner	Libéral	Arthabaska	1985	1st term
Jean Audet	Libéral	Beauce-Nord	1985	1st term
Robert Dutil	Libéral	Beauce-Sud	1985	1st term
Serge Marcil	Libéral	Beauharnois	1985	1st term
Louise Bégin	Libéral	Bellechasse	1985	1st term
Albert Houde	Libéral	Berthier	1981	2nd term
Jean-Guy Parent	Parti Québécois	Bertrand	1985	1st term
Gérard D. Levesque	Libéral	Bonaventure	1956	9th term
Louise Robic	Libéral	Bourassa	1985	1st term
Claude Trudel	Libéral	Bourget	1985	2nd term
Pierre Paradis	Libéral	Brome-Missisquoi	1980	3rd term
Gérard Latulippe	Libéral	Chambly	1985	1st term
Pierre A. Brouillette	Libéral	Champlain	1985	1st term
John J. Kehoe	Libéral	Chapleau	1981	2nd term
Marc-Yvan Côté	Libéral	Charlesbourg	1973, (Note: Matane) 1983	3rd term*
Daniel Bradet	Libéral	Charlevoix	1985	1st term
Pierrette Cardinal	Libéral	Châteauguay	1985	1st term
Rémy Poulin	Libéral	Chauveau	1985	1st term
Jeanne L. Blackburn	Parti Québécois	Chicoutimi	1985	1st term
Lise Bacon	Libéral	Chomedey	1973, (Note: Bourassa) 1981	3rd term*
André Vallerand	Libéral	Crémazie	1985	1st term
Herbert Marx	Libéral	D'Arcy-McGee	1979	3rd term
Yolande D. Legault	Libéral	Deux-Montagnes	1985	1st term
Violette Trépanier	Libéral	Dorion	1985	1st term
Jean-Guy St-Roch	Libéral	Drummond	1985	1st term
Hubert Desbiens	Parti Québécois	Dubuc	1976	3rd term
Denis Perron	Parti Québécois	Duplessis	1976	3rd term
Denis Perron	Independent	Duplessis	1976	3rd term
Denis Perron	Parti Québécois	Duplessis	1976	3rd term
Jean A. Joly	Libéral	Fabre	1985	1st term
Roger Lefebvre	Libéral	Frontenac	1985	1st term
André Beaudin	Libéral	Gaspé	1985	1st term
Michel Gratton	Libéral	Gatineau	1972	5th term
Jacques Rochefort	Parti Québécois	Gouin	1981	2nd term
Jacques Rochefort	Independent	Gouin	1981	2nd term
Madeleine Bleau	Libéral	Groulx	1985	1st term
Gilles Rocheleau	Libéral	Hull	1981	2nd term
Robert LeSage (1989)	Libéral	Hull	1989	1st term
Claude Dubois	Libéral (Note: First elected as a Union Nationale)	Huntingdon	1976	3rd term
Jacques Tremblay	Libéral	Iberville	1985	1st term
Georges Farrah	Libéral	Îles-de-la-Madeleine	1985	1st term
Joan Dougherty	Libéral	Jacques-Cartier	1981	2nd term
Michel Bissonnet	Libéral	Jeanne-Mance	1981	2nd term
Gil Rémillard	Libéral	Jean-Talon	1985	1st term
Carmen Juneau	Parti Québécois	Johnson	1981	2nd term
Guy Chevrette	Parti Québécois	Joliette	1976	3rd term
Francis Dufour	Parti Québécois	Jonquière	1985	1st term
France Dionne	Libéral	Kamouraska-Témiscouata	1985	1st term
Damien Hétu	Libéral	Labelle	1985	1st term
Thérèse Lavoie-Roux	Libéral	L'Acadie	1976	3rd term
Jacques Brassard	Parti Québécois	Lac-Saint-Jean	1976	3rd term
Jean-Claude Gobé	Libéral	LaFontaine	1985	1st term
Lawrence Cannon	Libéral	La Peltrie	1985	1st term
André Bourbeau	Libéral	Laporte	1981	2nd term
Jean-Pierre Saintonge	Libéral	La Prairie	1981	2nd term
Jean-Guy Gervais	Libéral	L'Assomption	1985	2nd term
Christos Sirros	Libéral	Laurier	1981	2nd term
Guy Bélanger	Libéral	Laval-des-Rapides	1985	1st term
Jean-Pierre Jolivet	Parti Québécois	Laviolette	1976	3rd term
Jean Garon	Parti Québécois	Lévis	1976	3rd term
Michel Després	Libéral	Limoilou	1985	1st term
Lewis Camden	Libéral	Lotbinière	1985	1st term
Réjean Doyon	Libéral	Louis-Hébert	1982	2nd term
Louise Harel	Parti Québécois	Maisonneuve	1981	2nd term
Gilles Fortin	Libéral	Marguerite-Bourgeoys	1984	2nd term
Cécile Vermette	Parti Québécois	Marie-Victorin	1985	1st term
Claude Dauphin	Libéral	Marquette	1981	2nd term
Yvon Picotte	Libéral	Maskinongé	1973	4th term
Claire-Hélène Hovington	Libéral	Matane	1985	1st term
Henri Paradis	Libéral	Matapédia	1985	1st term
Madeleine Bélanger	Libéral	Mégantic-Compton	1983	2nd term
Gérald Godin	Parti Québécois	Mercier	1976	3rd term
Jean-Pierre Belisle	Libéral	Mille-Îles	1985	1st term
Réal Gauvin	Libéral	Montmagny-L'Islet	1985	1st term
Yves Séguin	Libéral	Montmorency	1985	1st term
John Ciaccia	Libéral	Mont-Royal	1973	4th term
Clifford Lincoln	Libéral	Nelligan	1981	2nd term
Maurice Richard	Libéral	Nicolet	1985	1st term
Reed Scowen	Libéral	Notre-Dame-de-Grâce	1978	3rd term
Harold Thuringer (1987)	Libéral	Notre-Dame-de-Grâce	1987	1st term
Georges Vaillancourt	Libéral	Orford	1960	8th term
Pierre Fortier	Libéral	Outremont	1980	3rd term
Mark Assad	Libéral	Papineau	1970, 1981	4th term*
Norman MacMillan (1989)	Libéral	Papineau	1989	1st term
Robert Middlemiss	Libéral	Pontiac	1981	2nd term
Michel Pagé	Libéral	Portneuf	1973	4th term
Paul-André Forget	Libéral	Prévost	1985	1st term
Albert Khelfa	Libéral	Richelieu	1985	1st term
Yvon Vallières	Libéral	Richmond	1973, 1981	3rd term*
Michel Tremblay	Libéral	Rimouski	1985	1st term
Albert Côté	Libéral	Rivière-du-Loup	1985	1st term
Pierre MacDonald	Libéral	Robert-Baldwin	1985	1st term
Michel Gauthier	Parti Québécois	Roberval	1981	2nd term
Gaston Blackburn (1988)	Libéral	Roberval	1988	1st term
Guy Rivard	Libéral	Rosemont	1985	1st term
Robert Thérien	Libéral	Rousseau	1985	1st term
Gilles Baril	Libéral	Rouyn-Noranda–Témiscamingue	1985	1st term
Ghislain Maltais	Libéral	Saguenay	1983	2nd term
Maximilien Polak	Libéral	Saint-Anne	1981	2nd term
Michel Laporte	Libéral	Sainte-Marie	1985	1st term
Monique Gagnon-Tremblay	Libéral	Saint-François	1985	1st term
Roma Hains	Libéral	Saint-Henri	1981	2nd term
Roma Hains	Independent	Saint-Henri	1981	2nd term
Charles Messier	Libéral	Saint-Hyacinthe	1985	1st term
André Boulerice	Parti Québécois	Saint-Jacques	1985	1st term
Pierre Lorrain	Libéral	Saint-Jean	1985	1st term
Germain Leduc	Libéral	Saint-Laurent	1982	2nd term
Robert Bourassa (1986)	Libéral	Saint-Laurent	1966, (Note: Mercier) 1985, (Note: Bertrand) 1986	5th term*
Jacques Chagnon	Libéral	Saint-Louis	1985	1st term
Yvon Lemire	Libéral	Saint-Maurice	1985	1st term
Marcel Parent	Libéral	Sauvé	1984	2nd term
Roger Paré	Parti Québécois	Shefford	1981	2nd term
André J. Hamel	Libéral	Sherbrooke	1985	1st term
Claude Filion	Parti Québécois	Taillon	1985	1st term
Jean Leclerc	Libéral	Taschereau	1985	1st term
Yves Blais	Parti Québécois	Terrebonne	1981	2nd term
Paul Philibert	Libéral	Trois-Rivières	1985	2nd term
Christian Claveau	Parti Québécois	Ungava	1985	1st term
Christiane Pelchat	Libéral	Vachon	1985	1st term
Jean-Guy Lemieux	Libéral	Vanier	1985	1st term
Daniel Johnson Jr.	Libéral	Vaudreuil-Soulanges	1981	2nd term
Jean-Pierre Charbonneau	Parti Québécois	Verchères	1976	3rd term
Paul Gobeil	Libéral	Verdun	1985	1st term
William Cusano	Libéral	Viau	1981	2nd term
Cosmo Maciocia	Libéral	Viger	1981	2nd term
Jean-Paul Théorêt	Libéral	Vimont	1985	1st term
Richard French	Libéral	Westmount	1981	2nd term

== Other elected MNAs ==
Other MNAs were elected in by-elections in this mandate

- Robert Bourassa, Quebec Liberal Party, Saint-Laurent, January 20, 1986
- Harold Thuringer, Quebec Liberal Party, Notre-Dame-de-Grâce, September 14, 1987
- René Serge Larouche, Quebec Liberal Party, Anjou, June 20, 1988
- Gaston Blackburn, Quebec Liberal Party, Roberval, June 20, 1988
- Robert Lesage, Quebec Liberal Party, Hull, May 29, 1989
- Norman MacMillan, Quebec Liberal Party, Papineau, May 29, 1989

== Cabinet Ministers ==
- Prime Minister and Executive Council President: Robert Bourassa
- Deputy Premier: Lise Bacon
- Agriculture, Fisheries and Food: Michel Pagé
- Labor: Pierre Paradis (1985–1988), Yves Séguin (1988–1989)
- Workforce and Revenue Security: Pierre Paradis (1985–1988), André Bourbeau (1988–1989)
- Administration and President of the Treasury Board: Paul Gobeil (1985–1988), Daniel Johnson Jr. (1988–1989)
- Provisioning and Services: Gilles Rocheleau (1985–1988), Richard French (1988), Andre Vallerand (1988–1989)
- Cultural Affairs: Lise Bacon, Guy Rivard (Delegate Minister) (1988–1989)
- Cultural Communities and Immigration: Louise Robic (1985–1989), Monique Gagnon-Tremblay (1989)
- Cultural Communities (Delegate): Violette Trépanier (1989)
- Health and Social Services: Thérèse Lavoie-Roux, Robert Dutil (Delegate) (1987–1988), Louise Robic (1989)
- Family, Health and Social Services (Delegate): Robert Dutil (1987–1988)
- Status of Women: Monique Gagnon-Tremblay
- Education, Superior education and Science: Claude Ryan
- Recreation, Hunting and Fishing: Yvon Picotte
- Mines: Raymond Savoie (1985–1986)
  - Mines and Indian Affairs: Raymond Savoie (1986–1989)
- Fisheries (Delegate):Robert Dutil (1985–1987), Yvon Picotte (1987–1989)
- Transportation: Marc-Yvan Côté
- Communications: Richard French (1985–1988), Robert Dutil (1988–1989)
- Municipal Affairs: André Bourbeau (1985–1988), Pierre Paradis (1988–1989)
- Environment: Clifford Lincoln (1985–1988), Lise Bacon (1988–1989), Gaston Blackburn (Delegate) (1989)
- Energy and Resources: John Ciaccia
- Forests: Albert Côté
- Canadian Intergovernmental Affairs: Gil Rémillard
- International Relation: Gil Rémillard (1985–1988)
  - International Affairs: Paul Gobeil (1988–1989) André Vallerand (Delegate) (1988),
- Electoral reform: Michel Gratton
- Tourism: Yvon Picotte (1985–1987), Michel Gratton (1987–1989)
- Justice: Herbert Marx (1985–1988), Gil Rémillard (1988–1989)
- Solicitor General: Gerard Latulippe (1985–1987), Herbert Marx (1987–1988)
  - Public Safety: Herbert Marx (1988), Gil Rémillard (1988–1989)
- Finances: Gérard D. Levesque
  - Finances and Privatization (Delegate): Pierre Fortier (1986–1989)
    - Privatization (Delegate): Pierre Fortier (1985–1986)
- Revenue: Michel Gratton (1985–1987), Yves Séguin (1987–1989)
- Small and Medium Companies: André Vallerand (1985–1988)
- Foreign Trade and Technology Development: Pierre MacDonald (1985–1988)
- Industry and Commerce: Daniel Johnson Jr (1985–1988)
  - Industry, Commerce and Technology Development: Pierre MacDonald (1988)
    - Industry, Commerce and Technology: Pierre MacDonald (1988)
    - Technology Development (Delegate): Richard French (1988)
      - Technology (Delegate):Richard French (1988–1989), Guy Rivard (1989)

== New electoral districts ==
An electoral map reform was made in 1988 and the changes were implemented in the 1989 elections.

- Beauharnois and Huntingdon were merged to form Beauharnois-Huntingdon
- Chutes-de-la Chaudière was formed from parts of Lévis.
- La Pinière was formed from parts of La Prairie.
- Masson was formed from parts of L'Assomption and Terrebonne.
- Pointe-aux-Trembles was formed from parts of LaFontaine.
- Sainte-Marie and Saint-Jacques merged to form Sainte-Marie–Saint-Jacques.
- Vaudreuil-Soulanges was split in two ridings: Vaudreuil and Salaberry-Soulanges.
