= 1976 Quebec general election =

Canadian provincial election

- November 15, 1976

110 seats in the 31st National Assembly of Quebec 56 seats were needed for a majority
- Turnout: 85.27% (▲4.88%)
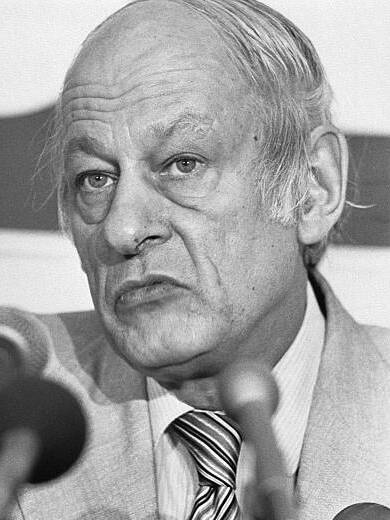

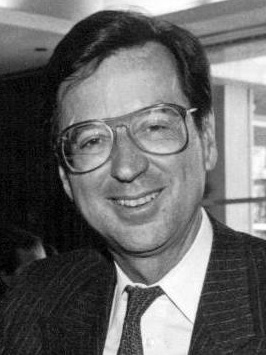
	First party	Second party	Third party
			UN
Leader	René Lévesque	Robert Bourassa	Rodrigue Biron
Party	Parti Québécois	Liberal	Union Nationale
Leader since	October 14, 1968	January 17, 1970	May 22, 1976
Leader's seat	Taillon	Mercier (lost re-election)	Lotbinière
Last election	6 seats, 30.22%	102 seats, 54.65%	0 seats, 4.92%
Seats won	71	26	11
Seat change	▲65	▼76	▲11
Popular vote	1,390,351	1,135,056	611,666
Percentage	41.37%	33.78%	18.20%
Swing	▲11.15%	▼20.87%	▲13.28%
	Fourth party	Fifth party
	RC	PNP
Leader	Camil Samson	Jérôme Choquette
Party	Ralliement créditiste	Parti national populaire
Leader since	May 11, 1975	October 24, 1976
Leader's seat	Rouyn-Noranda	Outremont (lost re-election)
Last election	2 seats, 9.92%	pre-creation
Seats won	1	1
Seat change	▼1	▲1
Popular vote	155,451	31,043
Percentage	4.63%	0.92%
Swing	▼5.29%	▲0.92%
- Popular vote by riding. As this is an FPTP election, seat totals are not determined by popular vote, but instead via results by each riding. Click the map for more details.
Premier before election
Robert Bourassa
Liberal
Premier after election
René Lévesque
Parti Québécois

The 1976 Quebec general election was held on November 15, 1976, to elect members to National Assembly of the province of Quebec, Canada. It was one of the most significant elections in Quebec history, rivalled only by the 1960 general election, and caused major repercussions in the rest of Canada. The Parti Québécois, led by René Lévesque, defeated the incumbent Quebec Liberal Party, led by Premier Robert Bourassa.

The Parti Québécois's campaign focused on providing good government, in contrast to the many scandals that had plagued the Liberals since 1973. The PQ's stated goal of achieving independence for Quebec from Canada was portrayed as only secondary, but the election of a sovereigntist government in Quebec caused great upset in the rest of Canada and led to extensive discussions about reforming the Canadian Confederation and finding ways of accommodating Quebec.

The Parti Québécois used its term in office to introduce numerous bills to implement its agenda. The first bill introduced in the new session of the National Assembly was legislation to confirm French as the sole official language of Quebec, and to implement measures to make this a social reality. The legislative number of this bill, "Bill One", was intended to signify the importance of the bill for the new government. The bill was withdrawn and significantly altered, however, and was eventually re-introduced as "Bill 101" (or la Loi 101 in French), also known as the Charter of the French Language. With some modifications, the Charter of the French Language remains in effect today and has shaped modern Quebec society in far-reaching ways.

The 1976 election also set the stage for the 1980 Quebec referendum on the PQ's proposal for political independence in an economic union with the rest of Canada called sovereignty-association. The proposal was soundly defeated in the referendum.

Bourassa had called the election after only three years, well before the maximum possible term of five years. It is possible that he may have counted on a boost from his successful rescue of the 1976 Summer Olympics in Montreal after cost overruns and construction delays by the Montreal municipal government of Mayor Jean Drapeau. If so, he badly miscalculated. He not only lost the election, but was resoundingly defeated in his own riding by a PQ challenger. Bourassa resigned as Liberal leader, and his political career appeared to be over. He left Quebec and took up teaching positions in the United States and Europe. However, he later made a remarkable comeback in the 1985 general election.

The once-powerful Union Nationale made a modest comeback after being shut out from the legislature three years earlier. It won 11 seats under Rodrigue Biron and, for the first time, won significant support from some anglophone voters. An anglophone UN member, William Shaw was elected to the National Assembly. However, this proved to be the party's last hurrah. Successive floor-crossings, retirements, and resignations reduced the UN to only five members during the term. The party lost all of those remaining seats five years later, never to return; it would continue to exist nominally until 1989.

== Campaign ==
The Liberals and péquistes both fielded full slates. The Unionists and the créditistes decided not to nominate candidates in Beauce-Sud, in order to clear the way for the pénépiste Fabien Roy to hold the riding. The Unionists did not have a candidate in Outremont. Otherwise, all other constituencies experienced at least four-way contests.

The election also saw the emergence of two other political groups. The Democratic Alliance, led by Nick Auf der Maur, ran 13 candidates in the anglophone areas of the Island of Montreal, while the Parti national populaire (founded by Fabien Roy and Jérôme Choquette) had 36 candidates provincewide but ran a less-organized campaign. The PNP had attempted to merge with the UN earlier in August, but the effort was called off in September because of a falling-out between Choquette and the UN leader Rodrigue Biron.

Riding contests, by number of candidates (1976)
Candidates	PQ	Lib	RC	UN	PNP	Ind	NDP-RMS	Comm	DA	Lab	LSO	Total
3	1	1			1							3
4	49	49	49	49								196
5	24	24	24	24	16	3	3		1	1		120
6	20	20	20	19	9	9	8	3	5	7		120
7	12	12	12	12	7	6	7	8	5	2	1	84
8	3	3	3	3	2	3	2	2	2	1		24
9	1	1	1	1	1	1	1	1		1		9
Total	110	110	109	108	36	22	21	14	13	12	1	556

== Results ==
Elections to the Legislative Assembly of Quebec (1976)
Political party	Party leader	MNAs				Votes			
Political party	Party leader	Candidates	1973	1976	±	#	±	%	± (pp)
Parti Québécois	René Lévesque	110	6	71	65▲	1,390,351	492,542▲	41.37%	11.15▲
Liberal	Robert Bourassa	110	102	26	76▼	1,135,056	488,678▼	33.78%	20.87▼
Union Nationale	Rodrigue Biron	108	–	11	11▲	611,666	465,457▲	18.20%	13.28▲
Ralliement créditiste	Camil Samson	109	2	1	1▼	155,451	139,255▼	4.63%	5.29▼
Parti national populaire	Jérôme Choquette	36	–	1	1▲	31,043	31,043▲	0.92%	New
Democratic Alliance	Nick Auf der Maur	13	–	–	–	17,762	17,762▲	0.53%	New
Independent		22	–	–	–	12,984	6,023▲	0.39%	0.16▲
New Democratic-RMS coalition	Henri-François Gautrin	21	–	–	–	3,080	3,080▲	0.09%	New
Communist	Sam Walsh	14	–	–	–	1,776	1,612▲	0.05%	0.04▲
Labour		12	–	–	–	1,249	1,249▲	0.04%	New
Ligue socialiste-ouvrière		1	–	–	–	88	88▲	–	New
Total		556	110	110		3,360,506		100.00%	
Rejected ballots						70,446	15,686▲		
Voter turnout						3,430,952	405,214▲	85.27	4.89▲
Registered electors						4,023,743	259,132▲		

=== Vote and seat summaries ===
Ternary plots - shift of electoral support (1973-1976)
1973

1976
Electoral districts identified by colours of winning parties

Seats and popular vote by party
Party	Seats	Votes	Change (pp)
█ Parti Québécois	71 / 110	41.37%	11.15
█ Liberal	26 / 110	33.78%	-20.87
█ Union Nationale	11 / 110	18.20%	13.28
█ Parti créditiste	1 / 110	4.63%	-5.29
█ Parti national populaire	1 / 110	0.92%	0.92
█ Independent	0 / 110	0.39%	0.16
█ Other	0 / 110	0.71%	0.65

=== Synopsis of results ===
Results by riding - 1976 Quebec general election
Riding	Winning party						Turnout (Note: including spoilt ballots)	Votes								
Name	1973	Party	Votes	Share	Margin #	Margin %	Turnout	PQ	Lib	UN	Cr	PNP	DA	Ind	Oth	Total
Abitibi-Est	Lib	PQ	11,265	40.15%	3,881	13.83%	69.47%	11,265	6,338	3,067	7,384	–	–	–	–	28,054
Abitibi-Ouest	Lib	PQ	8,533	36.51%	1,224	5.24%	80.57%	8,533	5,456	2,073	7,309	–	–	–	–	23,371
Anjou	Lib	PQ	19,440	56.15%	8,324	24.04%	88.99%	19,440	11,116	2,938	744	233	–	–	151	34,622
Argenteuil	Lib	Lib	9,452	34.89%	1,275	4.71%	82.34%	8,177	9,452	6,660	2,803	–	–	–	–	27,092
Arthabaska	Lib	PQ	12,465	38.95%	3,474	10.86%	89.36%	12,465	8,991	7,536	3,009	–	–	–	–	32,001
Beauce-Nord	Lib	PQ	10,974	37.12%	412	1.39%	85.29%	10,974	10,562	6,412	830	786	–	–	–	29,564
Beauce-Sud	Cr	PNP	17,238	68.24%	11,573	45.82%	83.62%	2,356	5,665	–	–	17,238	–	–	–	25,259
Beauharnois	Lib	PQ	15,508	46.29%	3,936	11.75%	90.09%	15,508	11,572	5,224	1,195	–	–	–	–	33,499
Bellechasse	Lib	UN	8,501	36.85%	798	3.46%	81.68%	5,881	7,703	8,501	692	294	–	–	–	23,071
Berthier	Lib	PQ	8,673	34.27%	402	1.59%	85.00%	8,673	8,271	6,907	1,454	–	–	–	–	25,305
Bonaventure	Lib	Lib	9,771	48.63%	3,603	17.93%	80.87%	6,168	9,771	3,836	318	–	–	–	–	20,093
Bourassa	Lib	PQ	14,465	44.94%	2,162	6.72%	88.04%	14,465	12,303	4,457	601	249	–	–	109	32,184
Bourget	Lib	PQ	17,122	54.85%	7,047	22.58%	87.99%	17,122	10,075	3,250	573	–	–	–	195	31,215
Brome-Missisquoi	Lib	UN	11,380	49.27%	5,930	25.67%	82.93%	4,772	5,450	11,380	1,087	262	–	147	–	23,098
Chambly	Lib	PQ	21,029	47.32%	5,201	11.70%	90.62%	21,029	15,828	6,776	811	–	–	–	–	44,444
Champlain	Lib	PQ	12,514	40.73%	4,428	14.41%	87.67%	12,514	8,086	7,882	2,240	–	–	–	–	30,722
Charlesbourg	Lib	PQ	19,985	48.92%	4,785	11.71%	89.20%	19,985	15,200	4,078	1,301	285	–	–	–	40,849
Charlevoix	Lib	Lib	12,419	54.58%	4,899	21.53%	83.27%	7,520	12,419	1,670	1,146	–	–	–	–	22,755
Châteauguay	Lib	PQ	15,600	43.00%	5,261	14.50%	88.30%	15,600	10,339	9,262	851	–	–	229	–	36,281
Chauveau	Lib	PQ	21,472	47.48%	5,054	11.17%	88.87%	21,472	16,418	4,829	2,507	–	–	–	–	45,226
Chicoutimi	PQ	PQ	20,638	62.51%	13,742	41.62%	88.55%	20,638	6,896	4,429	1,053	–	–	–	–	33,016
Crémazie	Lib	PQ	16,463	50.40%	4,612	14.12%	89.09%	16,463	11,851	3,449	461	277	–	–	163	32,664
D'Arcy-McGee	Lib	Lib	21,248	68.03%	14,190	45.43%	83.86%	1,476	21,248	7,058	83	–	950	417	–	31,232
Deux-Montagnes	Lib	PQ	13,449	41.42%	2,466	7.59%	86.17%	13,449	10,983	6,431	1,352	256	–	–	–	32,471
Dorion	Lib	PQ	15,486	52.36%	5,343	18.06%	84.55%	15,486	10,143	2,661	798	390	–	–	100	29,578
Drummond	Lib	PQ	14,605	42.45%	6,394	18.58%	89.05%	14,605	7,778	8,211	3,601	211	–	–	–	34,406
Dubuc	Lib	PQ	11,337	44.67%	3,661	14.42%	85.23%	11,337	7,676	4,442	1,926	–	–	–	–	25,381
Duplessis	Lib	PQ	20,100	58.60%	11,324	33.01%	78.85%	20,100	8,776	3,050	461	–	–	1,916	–	34,303
Fabre	Lib	PQ	24,067	51.94%	9,078	19.59%	89.24%	24,067	14,989	5,658	1,156	463	–	–	–	46,333
Frontenac	Lib	PQ	11,047	38.86%	1,558	5.48%	88.16%	11,047	6,395	9,489	1,494	–	–	–	–	28,425
Gaspé	Lib	UN	8,305	34.53%	420	1.75%	82.01%	7,630	7,885	8,305	233	–	–	–	–	24,053
Gatineau	Lib	Lib	13,444	48.98%	6,148	22.40%	78.30%	7,296	13,444	5,285	1,425	–	–	–	–	27,450
Gouin	Lib	PQ	14,360	53.53%	5,345	19.92%	84.45%	14,360	9,015	2,482	797	–	–	–	172	26,826
Hull	Lib	PQ	12,031	40.57%	2	0.01%	79.05%	12,031	12,029	4,193	1,402	–	–	–	–	29,655
Huntingdon	Lib	UN	9,465	42.31%	2,728	12.19%	84.21%	5,428	6,737	9,465	743	–	–	–	–	22,373
Iberville	Lib	PQ	11,740	35.71%	1,533	4.66%	87.38%	11,740	9,129	10,207	1,802	–	–	–	–	32,878
Îles-de-la-Madeleine	Lib	PQ	3,387	47.89%	60	0.85%	87.16%	3,387	3,327	298	60	–	–	–	–	7,072
Jacques-Cartier	Lib	Lib	10,390	35.34%	1,255	4.27%	84.86%	8,666	10,390	9,135	523	–	683	–	–	29,397
Jean-Talon	Lib	Lib	14,339	49.46%	2,807	9.68%	88.54%	11,532	14,339	2,706	417	–	–	–	–	28,994
Jeanne-Mance	Lib	PQ	22,891	45.48%	4,606	9.15%	86.39%	22,891	18,285	7,732	905	275	–	–	245	50,333
Johnson	Lib	UN	11,184	45.33%	4,805	19.48%	86.65%	6,379	5,348	11,184	1,761	–	–	–	–	24,672
Joliette-Montcalm	Lib	PQ	15,807	42.41%	5,311	14.25%	88.14%	15,807	10,496	9,612	1,172	–	–	89	97	37,273
Jonquière	Lib	PQ	20,373	58.23%	9,511	27.18%	89.26%	20,373	10,862	2,220	1,535	–	–	–	–	34,990
Kamouraska-Témiscouata	Lib	PQ	7,862	33.88%	310	1.34%	79.37%	7,862	7,552	4,957	2,837	–	–	–	–	23,208
L'Acadie	Lib	Lib	14,082	45.50%	4,406	14.24%	86.08%	9,676	14,082	6,434	276	–	327	–	152	30,947
L'Assomption	Lib	PQ	26,449	54.49%	14,439	29.74%	89.24%	26,449	12,010	8,155	1,724	205	–	–	–	48,543
Lac-Saint-Jean	Lib	PQ	14,744	50.91%	6,911	23.86%	86.97%	14,744	7,833	3,971	2,414	–	–	–	–	28,962
LaFontaine	PQ	PQ	20,627	61.79%	12,469	37.35%	86.95%	20,627	8,158	3,082	1,039	283	–	191	–	33,380
Laporte	Lib	PQ	23,129	56.56%	11,086	27.11%	87.64%	23,129	12,043	4,561	1,027	–	–	–	133	40,893
La Prairie	Lib	PQ	17,122	38.13%	647	1.44%	87.88%	17,122	16,475	10,375	930	–	–	–	–	44,902
Laurentides-Labelle	Lib	PQ	13,794	49.25%	4,069	14.53%	83.32%	13,794	9,725	2,992	1,499	–	–	–	–	28,010
Laurier	Lib	Lib	11,858	41.68%	2,275	8.00%	82.79%	9,583	11,858	4,962	678	–	921	–	446	28,448
Laval	Lib	Lib	17,605	42.94%	2,285	5.57%	88.42%	15,320	17,605	6,629	1,129	319	–	–	–	41,002
Laviolette	Lib	PQ	11,003	39.32%	2,174	7.77%	86.41%	11,003	6,074	8,829	1,603	357	–	–	115	27,981
Lévis	Lib	PQ	17,227	48.49%	5,887	16.57%	88.81%	17,227	11,340	5,585	1,375	–	–	–	–	35,527
Limoilou	Lib	PQ	14,424	45.33%	3,707	11.65%	86.09%	14,424	10,717	4,656	1,723	176	–	52	74	31,822
Lotbinière	Lib	UN	12,355	52.23%	6,713	28.38%	87.55%	4,605	5,642	12,355	1,055	–	–	–	–	23,657
Louis-Hébert	Lib	PQ	22,850	58.22%	9,543	24.31%	90.80%	22,850	13,307	2,705	386	–	–	–	–	39,248
Maisonneuve	PQ	PQ	15,390	62.15%	9,074	36.64%	80.89%	15,390	6,316	2,040	652	220	–	22	123	24,763
Marguerite-Bourgeoys	Lib	Lib	14,551	36.65%	806	2.03%	84.91%	13,745	14,551	10,492	603	–	–	–	312	39,703
Maskinongé	Lib	Lib	9,124	35.84%	403	1.58%	88.24%	8,721	9,124	6,561	1,055	–	–	–	–	25,461
Matane	Lib	PQ	11,042	48.79%	2,684	11.86%	82.23%	11,042	8,358	2,319	598	316	–	–	–	22,633
Matapédia	Lib	PQ	10,741	56.27%	5,458	28.59%	81.76%	10,741	5,283	1,552	1,512	–	–	–	–	19,088
Mégantic-Compton	Lib	UN	8,539	39.58%	2,502	11.60%	82.63%	4,809	6,037	8,539	2,188	–	–	–	–	21,573
Mercier	Lib	PQ	13,450	51.38%	3,736	14.27%	81.76%	13,450	9,714	1,975	647	–	–	58	332	26,176
Mille-Îles	Lib	PQ	25,134	53.80%	10,070	21.55%	90.84%	25,134	15,064	4,687	1,290	342	–	–	204	46,721
Mont-Royal	Lib	Lib	18,408	62.23%	13,295	44.94%	83.36%	4,776	18,408	5,113	153	–	885	–	247	29,582
Montmagny-L'Islet	Lib	Lib	9,220	37.44%	2,370	9.62%	81.84%	6,849	9,220	6,850	1,710	–	–	–	–	24,629
Montmorency	Lib	PQ	17,300	50.42%	5,190	15.13%	88.23%	17,300	12,110	3,187	1,713	–	–	–	–	34,310
Nicolet-Yamaska	Lib	UN	8,763	34.62%	750	2.96%	87.93%	7,195	8,013	8,763	1,340	–	–	–	–	25,311
Notre-Dame-de-Grâce	Lib	Lib	13,161	43.88%	4,429	14.77%	84.26%	4,100	13,161	8,732	167	119	3,497	117	103	29,996
Orford	Lib	Lib	8,321	32.90%	636	2.51%	81.40%	7,685	8,321	6,979	2,077	228	–	–	–	25,290
Outremont	Lib	Lib	13,219	45.30%	2,387	8.18%	84.31%	10,832	13,219	–	350	4,129	–	380	270	29,180
Papineau	Lib	PQ	12,967	36.32%	67	0.19%	79.55%	12,967	12,900	7,483	1,947	409	–	–	–	35,706
Pointe-Claire	Lib	UN	15,610	44.96%	3,431	9.88%	85.51%	3,284	12,179	15,610	127	164	943	2,412	–	34,719
Pontiac-Témiscamingue	Lib	Lib	8,149	43.57%	3,581	19.14%	74.98%	3,209	8,149	4,568	2,141	–	–	638	–	18,705
Portneuf	Lib	Lib	10,362	40.47%	2,783	10.87%	89.04%	7,579	10,362	3,815	3,741	106	–	–	–	25,603
Prévost	Lib	PQ	20,075	49.59%	7,569	18.70%	84.94%	20,075	12,506	5,707	2,195	–	–	–	–	40,483
Richelieu	Lib	PQ	16,141	51.98%	4,274	13.76%	90.28%	16,141	11,867	2,189	854	–	–	–	–	31,051
Richmond	Lib	UN	7,778	39.15%	1,907	9.60%	86.17%	5,294	5,871	7,778	925	–	–	–	–	19,868
Rimouski	Lib	PQ	15,232	53.04%	5,146	17.92%	86.34%	15,232	10,086	1,664	1,651	–	–	87	–	28,720
Rivière-du-Loup	Lib	PQ	9,415	38.53%	1,904	7.79%	84.49%	9,415	7,511	5,230	2,281	–	–	–	–	24,437
Robert-Baldwin	Lib	Lib	14,476	36.11%	3,947	9.84%	86.95%	7,430	14,476	10,529	410	–	2,188	5,060	–	40,093
Roberval	Lib	Lib	11,767	39.67%	932	3.14%	80.90%	10,835	11,767	3,139	3,923	–	–	–	–	29,664
Rosemont	Lib	PQ	15,455	51.07%	5,380	17.78%	85.25%	15,455	10,075	3,547	596	309	–	–	283	30,265
Rouyn-Noranda	Cr	RC	9,009	37.90%	1,456	6.13%	83.77%	7,553	4,923	2,283	9,009	–	–	–	–	23,768
Saguenay	PQ	PQ	15,491	69.16%	11,212	50.06%	78.48%	15,491	4,279	2,054	575	–	–	–	–	22,399
Saint-François	Lib	PQ	11,115	41.60%	3,623	13.56%	84.96%	11,115	7,492	6,114	1,996	–	–	–	–	26,717
Saint-Henri	Lib	PQ	14,246	47.72%	4,142	13.87%	83.78%	14,246	10,104	4,549	701	–	–	–	253	29,853
Saint-Hyacinthe	Lib	UN	10,002	33.63%	58	0.20%	86.38%	9,944	7,694	10,002	1,753	350	–	–	–	29,743
Saint-Jacques	PQ	PQ	13,058	60.31%	7,180	33.16%	75.34%	13,058	5,878	1,686	579	–	–	–	451	21,652
Saint-Jean	Lib	PQ	14,570	45.73%	3,695	11.60%	87.87%	14,570	10,875	5,439	977	–	–	–	–	31,861
Saint-Laurent	Lib	Lib	14,837	46.18%	6,297	19.60%	84.76%	8,540	14,837	7,409	294	327	719	–	–	32,126
Saint-Louis	Lib	Lib	9,628	42.07%	1,776	7.76%	75.22%	7,852	9,628	3,460	422	–	1,151	–	371	22,884
Saint-Maurice	Lib	PQ	12,836	45.77%	4,788	17.07%	88.64%	12,836	8,048	4,749	2,005	405	–	–	–	28,043
Saint-Anne	Lib	PQ	9,059	38.62%	689	2.94%	75.67%	9,059	8,370	3,783	497	121	649	896	79	23,454
Sainte-Marie	Lib	PQ	13,617	54.97%	5,043	20.36%	81.54%	13,617	8,574	1,711	674	–	–	–	197	24,773
Sauvé	PQ	PQ	23,647	58.60%	13,372	33.14%	84.99%	23,647	10,275	5,204	977	–	–	123	129	40,355
Shefford	Lib	Lib	9,662	31.81%	384	1.26%	87.20%	8,134	9,662	9,278	3,085	217	–	–	–	30,376
Sherbrooke	Lib	PQ	12,440	42.51%	3,895	13.31%	84.69%	12,440	8,545	6,255	1,872	–	–	150	–	29,262
Taillon	Lib	PQ	34,098	62.65%	22,345	41.06%	85.32%	34,098	11,753	6,189	2,129	–	–	–	256	54,425
Taschereau	Lib	PQ	9,929	45.14%	1,832	8.33%	80.05%	9,929	8,097	2,531	1,179	151	–	–	107	21,994
Terrebonne	Lib	PQ	21,298	50.61%	7,899	18.77%	89.48%	21,298	13,399	5,723	1,661	–	–	–	–	42,081
Trois-Rivières	Lib	PQ	13,821	43.79%	3,182	10.08%	85.26%	13,821	10,639	5,662	1,437	–	–	–	–	31,559
Vanier	Lib	PQ	16,640	49.80%	5,063	15.15%	87.41%	16,640	11,577	3,372	1,827	–	–	–	–	33,416
Vaudreuil-Soulanges	Lib	PQ	11,524	35.85%	534	1.66%	86.69%	11,524	10,990	8,548	905	–	–	–	174	32,141
Verchères	Lib	PQ	16,796	48.24%	4,990	14.33%	88.89%	16,796	11,806	5,224	992	–	–	–	–	34,818
Verdun	Lib	Lib	13,201	44.09%	3,261	10.89%	83.60%	9,940	13,201	5,833	499	–	315	–	150	29,938
Viau	Lib	PQ	13,513	43.44%	1,932	6.21%	84.67%	13,513	11,581	4,892	760	361	–	–	–	31,107
Westmount	Lib	Lib	14,724	50.74%	8,744	30.13%	82.23%	3,483	14,724	5,980	90	210	4,534	–	–	29,021

= open seat
= turnout is above provincial average
= winning candidate was in previous Legislature
= incumbent had switched allegiance
= previously incumbent in another riding
= not incumbent; was previously elected to the Legislature
= incumbency arose from byelection gain
= other incumbents renominated
= previously an MP in the House of Commons of Canada
= multiple candidates

=== MNAs elected by region and riding ===
Party designations are as follows:

PQ
Liberal
UN
Créditiste
Parti national populaire

Gaspésie–Îles-de-la-Madeleine and Bas-Saint-Laurent

- Bonaventure: Gérard D. Levesque
- Gaspé: Michel Le Moignan
- Îles-de-la-Madeleine: Denise Leblanc
- Kamouraska-Témiscouata: Léonard Lévesque
- Matane:Yves Bérubé
- Matapédia: Léopold Marquis
- Rimouski: Alain Marcoux
- Rivière-du-Loup: Jules Boucher

Côte-Nord and Saguenay–Lac-Saint-Jean

- Chicoutimi: Marc-André Bédard
- Dubuc: Hubert Desbiens
- Duplessis: Denis Perron
- Jonquière: Claude Vaillancourt
- Lac-Saint-Jean: Jacques Brassard
- Roberval: Robert Lamontagne
- Saguenay: Lucien Lessard

Capitale-Nationale

- Charlesbourg: Denis de Belleval
- Charlevoix: Raymond Mailloux
- Chauveau: Louis O'Neill
- Jean-Talon: Raymond Garneau
- Limoilou: Raymond Gravel
- Louis-Hébert: Claude Morin
- Montmorency: Clément Richard
- Portneuf: Michel Pagé
- Taschereau: Richard Guay
- Vanier: Jean-François Bertrand

Mauricie

- Champlain: Marcel Gagnon
- Laviolette: Jean-Pierre Jolivet
- Maskinongé: Yvon Picotte
- Saint-Maurice: Yves Duhaime
- Trois-Rivières: Denis Vaugeois

Chaudière-Appalaches and Centre-du-Québec

- Arthabaska: Jacques Baril
- Beauce-Nord: Adrien Ouellette
- Beauce-Sud: Fabien Roy
- Bellechasse: Bertrand Goulet
- Drummond: Michel Clair
- Frontenac: Gilles Grégoire
- Johnson: Maurice Bellemare
- Lévis: Jean Garon
- Lotbinière: Rodrigue Biron
- Montmagny-L'Islet: Julien Giasson
- Nicolet-Yamaska: Serge Fontaine

Estrie

- Mégantic-Compton: Fernand Grenier
- Orford: Georges Vaillancourt
- Richmond: Yvon Brochu
- Saint-François: Réal Rancourt
- Sherbrooke: Gérard Gosselin

Montérégie

- Beauharnois: Laurent Lavigne
- Brome-Missisquoi: Armand Russell
- Chambly: Denis Lazure
- Châteauguay: Roland Dussault
- Huntingdon: Claude Dubois
- Iberville: Jacques Beauséjour
- Laporte: Pierre Marois
- Laprairie: Gilles Michaud
- Richelieu: Maurice Martel
- Saint-Hyacinthe: Fabien Cordeau
- Saint-Jean: Jérôme Proulx
- Shefford: Richard Verreault
- Taillon: René Lévesque
- Vaudreuil-Soulanges: Louise Sauvé Cuerrier
- Verchères: Jean-Pierre Charbonneau

Montreal East

- Anjou: Pierre-Marc Johnson
- Bourassa: Patrice Laplante
- Bourget: Camille Laurin
- Crémazie: Guy Tardif
- Dorion: Lise Payette
- Gouin: Rodrigue Tremblay
- Jeanne-Mance: Henri-E. Laberge
- LaFontaine: Marcel Léger
- Laurier: André Marchand
- Maisonneuve: Robert Burns
- Mercier: Gérald Godin
- Rosemont: Gilbert Paquette
- Saint-Jacques: Claude Charron
- Sainte-Marie: Guy Bisaillon
- Sauvé: Jacques-Yvan Morin
- Viau: Charles-A. Lefebvre

Montreal West

- L'Acadie: Thérèse Lavoie-Roux
- D'Arcy-McGee: Victor Charles Goldbloom
- Jacques-Cartier: Noël Saint-Germain
- Marguerite-Bourgeoys: Fernand Lalonde
- Mont-Royal: John Ciaccia
- Notre-Dame-de-Grâce: Bryce Mackasey
- Outremont: André Raynauld
- Pointe-Claire: William Shaw
- Robert-Baldwin: John O'Gallagher
- Sainte-Anne: Jean-Marc Lacoste
- Saint-Henri: Jacques Couture
- Saint-Laurent: Claude Forget
- Saint-Louis: Harry Blank
- Verdun: Lucien Caron
- Westmount: George Springate

Laval

- Fabre: Bernard Landry
- Laval: Jean-Noël Lavoie
- Mille-Îles: Guy Joron

Laurentides

- Argenteuil: Zoël Saindon
- Deux-Montagnes: Pierre de Bellefeuille
- Laurentides-Labelle: Jacques Léonard
- Prévost: Jean-Guy Cardinal

Lanaudière

- Berthier: Jean-Guy Mercier
- Joliette-Montcalm: Guy Chevrette
- L'Assomption: Jacques Parizeau
- Terrebonne: Élie Fallu

Outaouais

- Gatineau: Michel Gratton
- Hull: Jocelyne Ouellette
- Papineau: Jean Alfred
- Pontiac-Témiscamingue: Jean-Guy Larivière

Abitibi-Témiscamingue and Nord-du-Québec

- Abitibi-Est: Jean-Paul Bordeleau
- Abitibi-Ouest: François Gendron
- Rouyn-Noranda: Camil Samson

=== Analysis ===
Party candidates in 2nd place
Party in 1st place	Party in 2nd place				Total
Party in 1st place	PQ	Lib	UN	RC	Total
Parti Québécois		65	4	2	71
Liberal	17		9		26
Union Nationale	2	9			11
Ralliement créditiste	1				1
Parti national populaire		1			1
Total	20	75	13	2	110

Candidates ranked 1st to 5th place, by party
Parties	1st	2nd	3rd	4th	5th
█ Parti Québécois	71	20	18	1	
█ Liberal	26	75	9		
█ Union Nationale	11	13	80	4	
█ Parti créditiste	1	2	1	91	8
█ Parti national populaire	1		1		31
█ Democratic Alliance			1	8	4
█ Independent				5	5
█ New Democratic-RMS coalition					7
█ Labour					4
█ Communist					1

Resulting composition of the 31st Quebec Legislative Assembly
Source		Party					
Source		PQ	Lib	UN	RC	PNP	Total
Seats retained	Incumbents returned	6	21		1		28
Seats retained	Open seats held		3				3
Seats retained	Ouster of incumbent changing allegiance		1				1
Seats retained	Previous incumbent from other riding		1				1
Seats changing hands	Incumbents defeated	52		9			61
Seats changing hands	Open seats gained	13		1			14
Seats changing hands	Byelection gain held			1			1
Seats changing hands	Incumbent changed allegiance					1	1
Total		71	26	11	1	1	110

== See also ==
- List of Quebec premiers
- Politics of Quebec
- Timeline of Quebec history
- List of Quebec political parties
- 31st National Assembly of Quebec
