= Coalition New Democratic Party of Quebec – Regroupement des militants syndicaux candidates in the 1976 Quebec provincial election =

The Coalition New Democratic Party of Quebec - Regroupement des militants syndicaux fielded twenty-one candidates in the 1976 Quebec provincial election, none of whom were elected.

== Electoral divisions ==
Riding	Candidate's name	Gender	Votes	%	Rank	Notes
Anjou	John Penner	M	151	0.44	6th	
Bourget	Micheline Ruelland	F	103	0.33	5th	
Crémazie	André Lavallée	M	80	0.25	7th	
Dorion	Lorraine de Repentigny Vaillancourt	F	100	0.34	6th	
Gouin	Wilbray Thiffault	M	78	0.29	6th	
L'Acadie	Pierre Lemaire	M	152	0.49	6th	
Laurier	Pierre Bastien	M	206	0.73	7th	
Laviolette	Robert Deschamps	M	115	0.41	6th	
Maisonneuve	Louis Cauchy	M	58	0.23	6th	
Marguerite-Bourgeoys	Thomas Rufh	M	312	0.78	5th	
Mercier	Henri-François Gautrin	M	139	0.53	5th	NDPQ leader
Mille-Îles	Ghislain Hallé	M	72	0.16	7th	
Mont-Royal	Monroe Dolman	M	143	0.48	6th	
Notre-Dame-de-Grâce	Cyril Durocher	M	103	0.34	8th	
Rosemont	Luc Bégin	M	145	0.48	6th	
Saint-Henri	Denis Poulin	M	136	0.45	5th	
Saint-Jacques	Michel Bourdouxhe	M	256	1.18	5th	
Saint-Louis	Jean-Pierre Bourdouxhe	M	211	0.92	6th	
Sainte-Marie	René Denis	M	90	0.36	6th	
Taillon	Jacques Beaudoin	M	256	0.47	5th	
Vaudreuil-Soulanges	Lawrence Arthur Brown	M	174	0.54	5th	
