= Parti marxiste–léniniste du Québec candidates in the 1989 Quebec provincial election =

The Parti marxiste–léniniste du Québec fielded thirty candidates in the 1989 Quebec provincial election, none of whom were elected. Information about these candidates may be found on this page.

== Candidates ==
=== Dorion: Francine Tremblay ===
Francine Tremblay ran for the Marxist-Leninist Party in four federal elections and two provincial elections.

Electoral record
| Election | Division | Party | Votes | % | Place | Winner |
|---|---|---|---|---|---|---|
| 1974 federal | Quebec East | Marxist-Leninist | 210 | 0.65 | 5/5 | Gérard Duquet, Liberal |
| 1979 federal | Rosemont | Marxist-Leninist | 115 | 0.29 | 9/9 | Claude-André Lachance, Liberal |
| 1980 federal | Rosemont | Marxist-Leninist | 91 | 0.26 | 9/9 | Claude-André Lachance, Liberal |
| 1981 provincial | Rosemont | Marxist-Leninist | 42 | 0.13 | 6/6 | Gilbert Paquette, Parti Québécois |
| 1988 federal | Papineau—Saint-Michel | N/A (Marxist-Leninist) | 193 | 0.49 | 7/9 | André Ouellet, Liberal |
| 1989 provincial | Dorion | Marxist-Leninist | 137 | 0.60 | 6/6 | Violette Trépanier, Liberal |

=== Viger: Catherine Commandeur ===
Catherine Commandeur was a physician who specialized in environmental workplace health. Her name is listed on the Marxist-Leninist party's Ottawa memorial. Commandeur was presumably related to Caroline Commandeur-Laloux, who has also sought election as a Marxist-Leninist candidate in Montreal.

Electoral record
| Election | Division | Party | Votes | % | Place | Winner |
|---|---|---|---|---|---|---|
| 1988 federal | Anjou—Rivière-des-Prairies | N/A (Marxist-Leninist) | 483 | 0.91 | 5/5 | Jean Corbeil, Progressive Conservative |
| 1989 provincial | Viger | Marxist-Leninist | 111 | 0.40 | 5/5 | Cosmo Maciocia, Liberal |
