= Maciocia =

Maciocia is a surname. Notable people with the surname include:

- Cosmo Maciocia (born 1942), Canadian politician
- Danny Maciocia (born 1967), Canadian football coach
