= Outremont (disambiguation) =

Outremont may refer to:

- Outremont, Quebec - a borough and former town in Montreal
- Outremont (electoral district) - a Canadian federal electoral district
- Outremont (provincial electoral district) - a Quebec provincial electoral district
