= Jean-Jacques Croteau =

Canadian politician (1930–2025)

Member of the National Assembly of Quebec for Sainte-Marie
- In office 8 October 1969 – 29 April 1970
- Preceded by: Edgar Charbonneau
- Succeeded by: Charles-Henri Tremblay

Personal details
- Born: 18 January 1930 Montreal, Quebec, Canada
- Died: 3 December 2025 (aged 95)
- Party: UN
- Education: Université de Sherbrooke
- Occupation: Lawyer

Jean-Jacques Croteau (18 January 1930 – 3 December 2025) was a Canadian politician of the Union Nationale (UN).

== Life and career ==
Born in Montreal on 18 January 1930, Croteau was the son of transport authority manager William Croteau and his wife, Jeanne Girouard. He studied at the École Saint-Louis-de-Gonzague, the Collège Sainte-Marie de Montréal, McGill University and the Université de Sherbrooke. In 1960, he was admitted to the Bar of Quebec. He practiced law in Montreal and joined Kiwanis before his 1969 election to the National Assembly of Quebec, representing Sainte-Marie. He was defeated in 1970 and was nominated by the Progressive Conservative Party in 1984 federal election in Richmond—Wolfe, but was defeated again. In 1985, he was nominated for the Superior Court of Quebec.

Croteau died on 3 December 2025 at the age of 95.
