= Iraca (disambiguation) =

Iraca may refer to:

- Iraca, priest and ruler of the Muisca
  - The Iraca Valley, where the seat of the iraca; Sugamuxi is situated
- Iraca (Incan god), god of the Incas
- Iraca (crater), crater on Saturn's Moon Rhea, named after the Incan god
- Carludovica palmata, called palma de iraca in Spanish
- Alexandre Iracà, Canadian politician
