= Cordeau =

Cordeau is a French language surname. Notable people with the surname include:

- Amélie Cordeau (born 2005), French archer
- Fabien Cordeau (1923–2007), Quebec politician
