= Charles-Henri Tremblay =

Canadian politician (1919–1982)

Charles-Henri Tremblay (1919–1982) was a politician in Quebec, Canada.

== Background ==
He was born on March 14, 1919, in Jonquière, Quebec (now Saguenay, Quebec). He was a technician with Hydro-Québec.

== Political career ==
Tremblay successfully ran as a Parti Québécois candidate to the National Assembly of Quebec in the district of Sainte-Marie in the 1970 election. He was defeated in the 1973 election by Liberal candidate Jean-Claude Malépart and in the district of Saint-Hyacinthe in the 1976 election by Union Nationale candidate Fabien Cordeau.

== Death ==
He died on March 31, 1982.

== Footnotes ==
National Assembly of Quebec
Preceded by Jean-Jacques Croteau (Union Nationale)	MNA for Sainte-Marie; 1970–1973	Succeeded by Jean-Claude Malépart (Liberal)
