= Pontiac–Témiscamingue =

Pontiac–Témiscamingue may refer to:

- Pontiac–Témiscamingue (provincial electoral district)
- Pontiac–Témiscamingue (federal electoral district)
