= Democratic Alliance (Quebec) =

Defunct political party in Quebec, Canada

Democratic Alliance (Alliance démocratique, AD) was a short-lived political party in Quebec, Canada, founded by the Montreal journalist and politician Nick Auf der Maur. This left-of-centre political party was mainly based among the anglophone communities in Montreal.

The Democratic Alliance was closely linked with the Montreal Citizens' Movement, a political party at the municipal level. Bob Keaton, the DA’s candidate in Notre-Dame-de-Grâce riding had served as an MCM councilor on Montreal City Council. The DA presented a center-left platform that was described by the Montreal Gazette as being "complementary to that of the PQ though diametrically opposed on the issue of secession".

After the election, the DA was enthusiastic despite not winning any seats in the National Assembly and were planning to meet to discuss strategy for the next phase. The party’s best result was in Notre-Dame-de-Grâce riding where Bob Keaton placed a close third behind the Liberals and the Union Nationale.

The party was disbanded shortly after the 1976 Quebec general election, in which it won 0.53% of the popular vote.

== Election results ==
Election	Party leader	# of candidates nominated	# of seats won	standing	# of total votes	% of popular vote
1976	Nick Auf der Maur	13	0 / 110	6th	17,762	0.53%

== See also ==
- Politics of Quebec
- List of Quebec general elections
- List of Quebec premiers
- List of Quebec leaders of the Opposition
- National Assembly of Quebec
- Timeline of Quebec history
- Political parties in Quebec
