= Nick Auf der Maur =

Canadian journalist and politician (1942–1998)

Montreal City Councillor

Personal details
- Born: April 10, 1942
- Died: April 7, 1998 (aged 55) Montreal
- Party: Various
- Spouse: Linda Gaboriau (1977-1978)
- Children: Melissa Auf der Maur
- Awards: Ruelle Nick Auf De Maur

Nikolaus Erik Auf der Maur (April 10, 1942 – April 7, 1998) was a Canadian journalist and politician from Montreal, Quebec. He was the father of rock musician Melissa Auf der Maur.

== Early life ==
Auf der Maur was born in 1942, the youngest of four children of Swiss German immigrants J. Severin and Theresa Auf der Maur.

== Journalist ==
Auf der Maur was on the staff of the Montreal Gazette as a regular columnist. When the Montreal Star ceased operation in 1977, most of the staff of the Gazette moved into the Star building on Saint-Jacques Street. His daughter Melissa Auf der Maur was a frequent subject of his newspaper columns as she was growing up. Melissa once observed that she had been known her whole life as Nick Auf der Maur's daughter, until she became the bassist for Hole, whereupon he became known as Melissa Auf der Maur's father.

Auf der Maur was also a television personality, serving as co-host of the Canadian Broadcasting Corporation's Quelque-Show with Les Nirenberg during the early 1970s. He worked for CJAD-AM radio.

== Politician ==
As a young man, Auf der Maur participated in left-wing politics. While working as a story editor at the Canadian Broadcasting Corporation, he and his producer were arrested under the War Measures Act during the October Crisis. His cell was across from that of future Parti Québécois cabinet minister Gérald Godin. He was not charged.

In 1974, he was elected a city councillor for Montreal for the Montreal Citizens' Movement. His campaign manager in his first election campaign was Stuart McLean. In 1976, he formed the Alliance démocratique (Democratic Alliance) party and ran as a candidate in the 1976 provincial election; the party won no seats and soon disbanded. In 1978 and 1982, he was again elected city councillor for the Municipal Action Group, and in 1986 was re-elected as an independent candidate. In the 1984 federal election, he ran as a Progressive Conservative candidate in Notre-Dame-de-Grâce, and although the Conservatives won that election in a landslide, including many Quebec seats, Auf der Maur failed to win his seat.

Auf der Maur was a frequent candidate in provincial and federal elections in Quebec, never successfully. He changed political affiliation often. He accurately predicted the massive cost overruns and deficits of the 1976 Summer Olympics held in Montreal, and was a sharp critic of longtime mayor Jean Drapeau. In 1987 Auf der Maur controversially supported the Overdale development, which saw nearly 100 of his constituents evicted from their homes, which were then demolished in 1989.

In 1988, he briefly joined the Civic Party of retired former mayor Jean Drapeau, to whom he had previously been bitterly opposed. He left that party a year later, eventually joining the Montreal Municipal Party, an evolution of the Municipal Action Group. Following a merger of the Montreal Municipal Party and the old Civic Party in 1992, he again became part of the new Civic Party, but again left a year later. In 1994, he ran in his final election as an independent, and was defeated. Columnist Allan Fotheringham wrote that half the voters in Montreal thought Auf der Maur was a joke and the other half thought he was a legend.

== Personal life and death ==
In 1972, he had a child with dramaturg Linda Gaboriau. He did not meet his daughter, Melissa Auf der Maur, until she was three. He married Gaboriau when Melissa was five, and they were divorced in less than a year.

Auf der Maur was a regular at various downtown Montreal bars, and often transacted official and unofficial business there.

In November 1996, Courtney Love's estranged father Hank Harrison was in Montreal to promote a film that made veiled accusations against Love's alleged involvement in the death of Kurt Cobain. While Harrison was speaking at a press conference, Auf der Maur took the microphone away and denounced Harrison causing a scene in his hometown.

Known for his smoking, drinking, and fighting, he was diagnosed with throat cancer in December 1996 and died in 1998. His funeral at St. Patrick's Basilica was attended by nearly 3,000 people. He was interred in the Cimetière Notre-Dame-des-Neiges in Montreal, Quebec.

He was strongly opposed to the practice of renaming streets after well-known individuals. Therefore, after his death, when it was decided to honour him with a street name, it was necessary to find a street with no name. A small alley off of Rue Crescent, at whose bars Auf der Maur was a regular, was therefore renamed Ruelle Nick-Auf der Maur.

== Books ==
He wrote the book The Billion-Dollar Game: Jean Drapeau and the 1976 Olympics (ISBN 0-88862-106-X). He was a co-author, along with Robert Chodos and Rae Murphy, of the 1984 book Brian Mulroney: The Boy from Baie Comeau, a biography of the new Canadian prime minister Brian Mulroney. He edited Quebec: A Chronicle 1968-1972 (ISBN 0-88862-025-X) along with Robert Chodos, which is a collection of articles from the Last Post, a short-lived left-leaning English publication in Quebec during the 1970s.

He is the subject of the book Nick: A Montreal Life (ISBN 1-55065-114-5), a collection of his columns published posthumously by the Montreal Gazette. The introduction was written by his long-time friend Mordecai Richler, and contains over 20 caricatures of Auf der Maur drawn by political cartoonist Aislin.

Ruelle Nick-Auf der Maur

Close up
