= Guy Bisaillon =

Canadian politician

- Born: July 21, 1939; Montreal, Quebec, Canada
- Died: March 21, 2017 (aged 77); Montreal, Quebec, Canada
- Education: Université de Montréal
- Occupations: Teacher, Politician, Administrator

Guy Bisaillon (July 21, 1939 - March 21, 2017) was a Canadian politician. Bisaillon served in the National Assembly of Quebec from 1976 to 1985, initially as a member of the Parti Québécois (PQ) and later as an independent.

== Early life and private career ==
Bisaillon was born in Montreal and studied at the Collège Saint-Paul, the École normale Jacques-Cartier, and the Université de Montréal. He has a teaching diploma and a master's degree in public administration from the École nationale d'administration publique (ENAP). He worked as a teacher for seven years and, during this time, became an active member of the labour movement. From 1971 to 1973, he was an administrator with the Centrale d'enseignement du Québec (CEQ).

In August 1976, Bisaillon led a high-profile campaign in support of the Gens de l'Air du Québec, an organization of francophone air traffic controllers who were fighting a federal regulation restricting the use of French in their workplace.

== Political career ==
Bisaillon became politically active as a member of the radical Rassemblement pour l'Indépendance Nationale (RIN), a precursor to the Parti Québécois. He later became a prominent figure on the PQ's indépendantiste left-wing and often quarreled with its more moderate and gradualist leadership. He first ran for office in the 1973 Quebec provincial election in the division of Taillon, where he was narrowly defeated by Liberal incumbent Guy Leduc.

=== PQ legislator ===
Bisaillon agreed to stand aside to permit PQ leader René Lévesque to run in Taillon in the 1976 provincial election. Running instead in Sainte-Marie, he was elected with a convincing victory over Liberal incumbent Jean-Claude Malépart. There was some speculation that Lévesque might appoint Bisaillon to cabinet as a means of restricting his political independence, though ultimately this did not occur.

As a government backbencher, Bisaillon campaigned for the Lévesque administration to strengthen its anti-scab legislation in 1977. In 1978, he and fellow PQ representative Guy Chevrette worked as mediators to end a strike by editorial support workers at the newspaper Le Soleil.

Bisaillon wrote a critical status review of the Parti Québécois in 1979; while this was intended as a private document for internal circulation, it was soon leaked to the media and caused a storm of controversy. Bisaillon criticized the party for downplaying its support of Quebec independence and accused the PQ leadership of stifling debate within the party. Journalist William Johnson noted that Bisaillon's review represented the concerns of many within the party.

In early 1980, Bisaillon and fellow PQ legislator Denise Leblanc launched a committee to raise money in support of the Parti acadien in New Brunswick. This initiative was not supported by the PQ leadership. In October 1980, Bisaillon was the only member of the Quebec legislature to vote against back to work legislation for the province's striking teachers.

In 1981, Bisaillon took part in a civic committee that recommended parole for former Front de libération du Québec (FLQ) militant Paul Rose.

Bisaillon was re-elected for a second term in the 1981 provincial election. Later in the same year, he organized a gathering of various left-wing movements in Montreal and openly speculated about leaving the PQ, charging that it had drifted from its original goals. He initially chose to remain within the party but, ultimately, resigned to serve as an independent legislator on June 21, 1982. In making this decision, he cited his opposition to the PQ's labour policies and its downplaying of sovereignty.

=== Independent legislator ===
In late 1982, Bisaillon voted against a government bill imposing new contracts and wage rollbacks on Quebec's public sector workers. He called for the abolition of Quebec's inheritance taxes in 1984, saying they caused more harm than benefits. In 1985, he introduced a motion to permit injured workers to receive full compensation in disputed cases until such time as all appeals were exhausted.

Bisaillon strongly criticized the PQ government in a debate over a motion of non-confidence in March 1985, charging that Lévesque's administration had demonstrated "a total lack of vision and rigor when dealing with the economy, constitutional negotiations, or the public service" and had "accomplished virtually nothing for more than four years." Shortly after this time, he moved a separate non-confidence motion that charged the government with "inability to implement a policy of full employment." The government narrowly survived both motions. During this period, Bisaillon became the unofficial leader of a group of seven former Péquiste legislators who formed a de facto opposition party in the legislature.

In May 1985, Bisaillon and three other party dissidents sponsored a private member's bill to recognize Quebec's right to self-determination. The bill was unsuccessful. The following month, the National Assembly of Quebec approved a bill to restrict the franchise in school board elections, such that only Catholics and Protestants would be able to vote in elections for the Montreal Catholic School Commission and the Protestant School Board of Greater Montreal, respectively. A practical consequence of the bill was to withdraw the franchise from Jews, Muslims, and other non-Catholics and non-Protestants. The only representatives to vote against the bill were members of the Quebec Liberal Party and Bisaillon.

Bisaillon did not seek re-election in 1985.

== Later career ==
Bisaillion worked with ENAP between 1985 and 1987 and later became active in radio and as a labour relations consultant. He became director-general of the Coopérative de développement régional de Montréal-Laval in 1997 and was chosen as its president in 2004.

Bisaillon considered running for the House of Commons of Canada as a supporter of Quebec independence in a 1990 by-election in Laurier—Sainte-Marie. He chose not to run after Gilles Duceppe declared his candidacy, so as not to split the sovereigntist vote.

== Electoral record ==
1981 Quebec general election: Sainte-Marie
| Party | Candidate | Votes | % |
|---|---|---|---|
| Parti Québécois | Guy Bisaillon (incumbent) | 13,667 | 61.35 |
| Liberal | Jacques Dion | 7,600 | 34.12 |
| Union Nationale | Paul-Émile Gélinas | 493 | 2.21 |
| Workers Communist | Lorraine Rondeau | 147 | 0.66 |
| Independent | Jacques Lavoie | 101 | 0.45 |
| Marxist–Leninist | Claude Brunelle | 85 | 0.38 |
| Workers | Maurice Gohier | 63 | 0.28 |
| United Social Credit | René Paré | 43 | 0.19 |
| Communist | Gaétan Trudel | 43 | 0.19 |
| Independent | Stéphane Verdier | 34 | 0.15 |
| Total valid votes | | 22,276 | 98.58 |
| Rejected and declined votes | | 322 | 1.42 |
| Turnout | | 22,598 | 75.11 |
| Electors on the lists | | 30,087 | |
Source: Official Results, Le Directeur général des élections du Québec.

1976 Quebec general election: Sainte-Marie
| Party | | Candidate | Votes | % | ±% |
|---|---|---|---|---|---|
| | Parti Québécois | Guy Bisaillon | 13,617 | 54.97 | |
| | Liberal | Jean-Claude Malépart (incumbent) | 8,574 | 34.61 | |
| | Union Nationale | André Roy | 1,711 | 6.91 | |
| | Ralliement créditiste | Roger Hébert | 674 | 2.72 | |
| } | Workers | André Rousseau | 107 | 0.43 | |
| | NDP - RMS coalition | René Denis | 90 | 0.36 | |
| Total valid votes | | | 24,773 | 100.00 | |
| Rejected and declined votes | | | 795 | | |
| Turnout | | | 25,568 | 81.54 | |
| Electors on the lists | | | 31,355 | | |
Source: Official Results, Le Directeur général des élections du Québec.

1973 Quebec general election: Taillon
| Party | Candidate | Votes | % | ±% |
|---|---|---|---|---|
| Liberal | Guy Leduc (incumbent) | 18,346 | 46.67 | |
| Parti Québécois | Guy Bisaillon | 17,769 | 45.20 | |
| Parti créditiste | Bernard-E. Laplante | 2,546 | 6.48 | |
| Union Nationale | Marcel Marcoux | 550 | 1.40 | |
| Independent | Jean-Paul Paré | 103 | 0.26 | |
| Total valid votes | | 39,314 | 100.00 | |
| Rejected and declined votes | | 1,333 | | |
| Turnout | | 40,647 | 78.88 | |
| Electors on the lists | | 51,529 | | |
Source: Official Results, Le Directeur général des élections du Québec.
