= Isabelle Millette =

Canadian politician

Isabelle Millette MNA

Member of the National Assembly for Papineau
- Incumbent
- Assumed office October 5, 2026
- Preceded by: Mathieu Lacombe

Personal details
- Party: Parti Québécois

Isabelle Millette MNA is a Canadian politician who served as a member of the National Assembly of Quebec representing the electoral district of Papineau since 2026. She is a member of the Parti Québécois.

Millette is a former entrepreneur.

== Electoral record ==
2026 Quebec general election: Papineau
** Preliminary results — Not yet official **
Party	Candidate	Votes	%	±%
Parti Québécois	Isabelle Millette	11,181	30.17	
Liberal	Isabelle Sabourin	10,625	28.67	
Conservative	Michel Kadri	8,143	21.97	
Coalition Avenir Québec	Linda Gauthier	4,167	11.24	
Québec solidaire	Benoit Renaud	2,625	7.08	
Independent	Julie Gomez	316	0.85	
Total valid votes				
Total rejected ballots				
Turnout			61.65	
Electors on the lists			–	–
Source: Élections Québec
