= Mathieu Lacombe =

Canadian politician

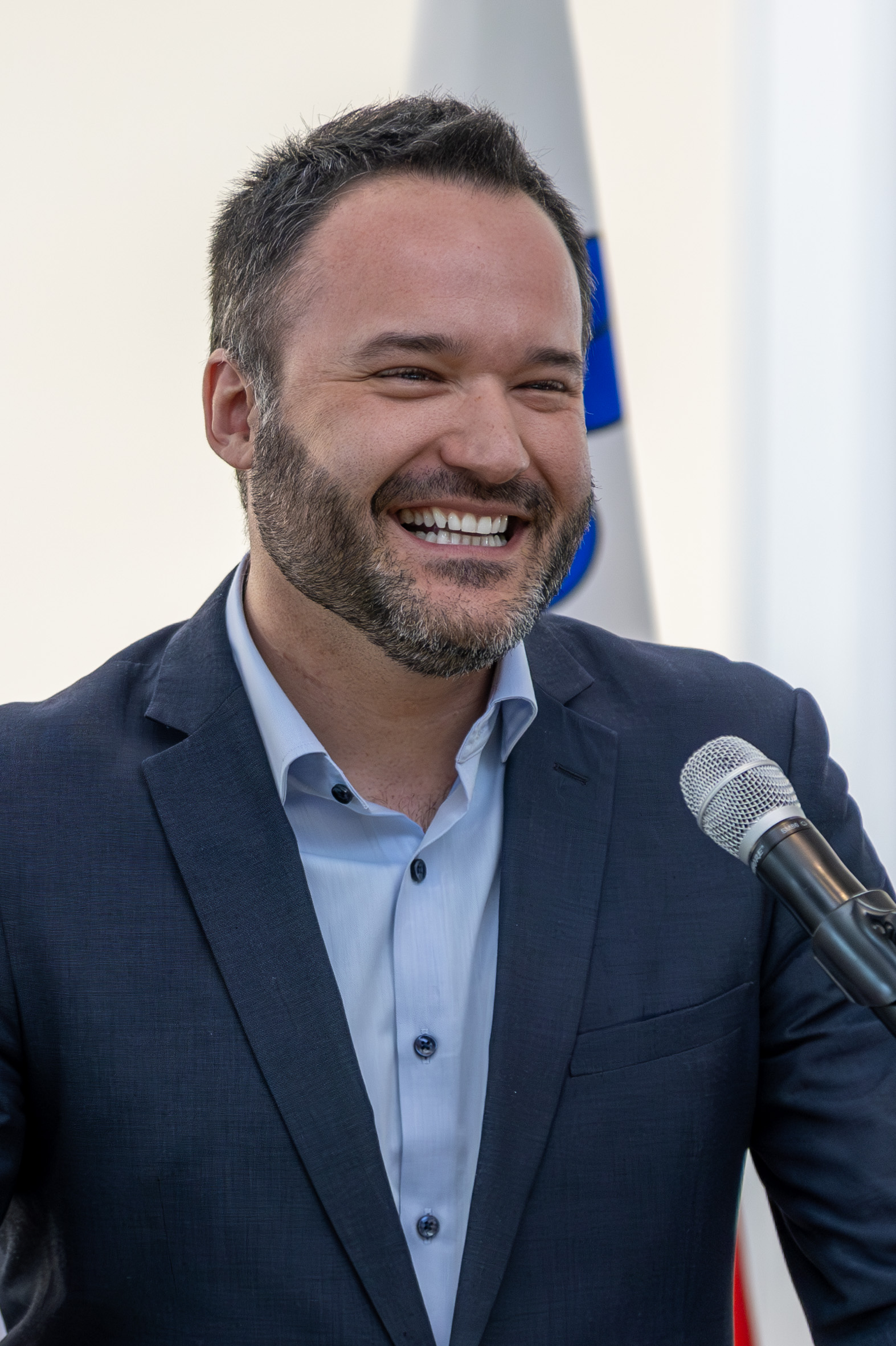
- Lacombe in 2024

Member of the National Assembly of Quebec for Papineau
- In office October 1, 2018 – August 27, 2026
- Preceded by: Alexandre Iracà
- Succeeded by: Isabelle Millette

Minister of Culture and Communications
- In office October 20, 2022 – October 9, 2026
- Preceded by: Nathalie Roy
- Succeeded by: Martine Biron

Minister of Families
- In office October 18, 2018 – October 20, 2022
- Preceded by: Luc Fortin
- Succeeded by: Suzanne Roy

Personal details
- Born: 1988 (age 37–38) Repentigny, Quebec, Canada
- Party: Independent (since 2026); Coalition Avenir Québec (until 2026)
- Profession: News anchor

Mathieu Lacombe is a Canadian politician who was elected to the National Assembly of Quebec in the 2018 provincial election. He represented the electoral district of Papineau as a member of the Coalition Avenir Québec and was the former Minister of Families. He was re-elected in the 2022 provincial election. He did not seek re-election in the 2026 general election. Following the 2026 election, Lacombe was removed from the CAQ caucus and as a Cabinet minister after attending a Parti Québécois victory rally.

Prior to his election to the National Assembly, he was the spokesperson for the Société de transport de l'Outaouais, and before that he was a television news anchor for TVA Nouvelles on TVA affiliate CHOT-DT.

== Electoral record ==
2022 Quebec general election: Papineau
| Party | Candidate | Votes | % | ±% |
|---|---|---|---|---|
| Coalition Avenir Québec | Mathieu Lacombe | 19,791 | 52.83 | +5.9 |
| Québec solidaire | Marie-Claude Latourelle | 5,164 | 13.78 | -1.24 |
| Conservative | Marc Carrière | 4,970 | 13.27 | +11.99 |
| Parti Québécois | Audrey-Ann Chicoine | 3,834 | 10.23 | -0.35 |
| Liberal | Wittlyn Kate Semervil | 3,151 | 8.41 | -14.70 |
| Green | Melissa Arbour | 450 | 1.20 | -0.31 |
| Démocratie directe | Cédric Brazeau | 104 | 0.28 | – |
| Total valid votes | | 37,464 | 98.99 | – |
| Total rejected ballots | | 383 | 1.01 | – |
| Turnout | | 37,847 | 59.44 | |
| Electors on the lists | | 63,674 | | |

2018 Quebec general election: Papineau
| Party | Candidate | Votes | % | ±% |
|---|---|---|---|---|
| Coalition Avenir Québec | Mathieu Lacombe | 16,975 | 46.93 | +22.28 |
| Liberal | Alexandre Iracà | 8,358 | 23.11 | -27.24 |
| Québec solidaire | Mélanie Pilon-Gauvin | 5,434 | 15.02 | +8.34 |
| Parti Québécois | Yves Destroismaisons | 3,828 | 10.58 | -14.07 |
| Green | Michel Tardif | 547 | 1.51 | |
| Conservative | Joanne Godin | 463 | 1.28 | |
| Citoyens au pouvoir | Lynn Boyer | 252 | 0.7 | |
| Parti nul | Isabelle Yde | 227 | 0.63 | -0.74 |
| Parti 51 | Claude Flaus | 84 | 0.23 | |
| Total valid votes | | 36,168 | 98.78 | |
| Total rejected ballots | | 446 | 1.22 | |
| Turnout | | 36,614 | 60.88 | |
| Eligible voters | | 60,137 | | |
| Coalition Avenir Québec gain from Liberal | | Swing | | +24.76 |
Source(s) "Rapport des résultats officiels du scrutin". Élections Québec.

D'Arcy-McGee

2008 Quebec general election
| Party | Candidate | Votes | % | ±% |
|---|---|---|---|---|
| Liberal | Lawrence Bergman | 14,087 | 88.75 | +4.54 |
| Green | Jean-Christophe Mortreux | 666 | 4.20 | -2.52 |
| Parti Québécois | Marie-Aude Ardizzon | 564 | 3.55 | +0.30 |
| Action démocratique | Mathieu Lacombe | 292 | 1.84 | -2.43 |
| Québec solidaire | Abraham Weizfeld | 264 | 1.66 | +0.11 |
| Total valid votes | | 15,873 | 99.22 | – |
| Total rejected ballots | | 125 | 0.78 | – |
| Turnout | | 15,998 | 38.89 | -14.21 |
| Electors on the lists | | 41,132 | – | – |

Quebec provincial government of François Legault
Cabinet post (1)
| Predecessor | Office | Successor |
|---|---|---|
| Luc Fortin | Minister of Families; October 18, 2018 – October 20, 2022 | Suzanne Roy |
