= Jérôme Choquette =

Canadian lawyer and politician

MNA for Outremont
- In office 1966–1976
- Preceded by: first member
- Succeeded by: André Raynauld

Personal details
- Born: January 25, 1928 Montreal, Quebec, Canada
- Died: September 1, 2017 (aged 89)
- Party: Liberal

Jérôme Choquette (French pronunciation: [ʒeʁom ʃɔkɛt]; January 25, 1928 – September 1, 2017) was a lawyer and politician in Quebec, Canada. Choquette ran a private law practice, representing various claimants in a wide range of cases from his office on Avenue du Parc, downtown Montreal.

== Early life ==
Choquette was born in Montreal, Quebec, and studied at the Notre-Dame-de-Grâce Academy and Collège Stanislas in Montreal, a Roman Catholic private school considered an elite institution in Quebec. He graduated from McGill University with a law degree in 1949, and was called to the Bar of Quebec in the same year. In 1951, he obtained a doctorate in economics from the Paris Law School in Paris, France. He also studied at the School of Business Administration at Columbia University in New York City.

He practised law in Montreal beginning in 1951 and was given the honorary title of Queen's Counsel in 1963.

== Career ==
=== Member of the National Assembly ===
In the 1966 provincial election, he was elected to the provincial legislature of Quebec from the riding of Outremont in Montreal as a member of the Quebec Liberal Party. He was re-elected in the 1970 and 1973 elections.

=== Cabinet member ===
In the Liberal government of Robert Bourassa, he served as Minister of Financial Institutions from May to October 1970, Minister of Justice from May 1970 to July 1975, and Minister of Education from July to September 1975, when he resigned from the Liberal Party.

Choquette was the Minister of Justice during the October Crisis and one of the targets of the Front de libération du Québec (FLQ) terrorists who kidnapped and murdered Pierre Laporte, his fellow cabinet member and then-Deputy Premier. Seen as a decisive and strong Cabinet Minister, Choquette took the position during the Crisis that the government of Quebec could not give in to the FLQ demands without compromising its responsibility as the democratically elected government. Choquette openly carried a revolver during the crisis, he said, so that he could not be harassed. He also suggested that Bourassa name a minister of social peace. In a memorandum of John Starnes dated of October 29, 1970, he writes : "It appeared that the municipal authorities in Montreal had information which appeared to implicate the Quebec minister of Justice, Mr. Choquette, in the FLQ conspiracy." Following the resolution of the Crisis and expiration of the War Measures Act, Choquette brought in the services of the Quebec Ombudsman and provided the vehicle by which anyone unjustly treated had their case reviewed and given proper compensation. During the October Crisis, Choquette reportedly reluctantly supported the suspension of civil liberties under the War Measures Act.

Until he was removed from the portfolio, Choquette was deeply involved and interested in prosecuting Henry Morgentaler.

Choquette was the Cabinet Minister who helped create the Quebec Charter of Human Rights and Freedoms, introduced it into the National Assembly in 1975 and established Quebec's legal aid system.

=== Parti National Populaire ===
In September 1975, Choquette resigned as Minister of Education over differences in language policy. He wanted stricter enforcement of the requirement that children whose parents were not educated in English be educated in French. He repeatedly refused the entreaties of Maurice Bellemare that he take over the leadership of the Union Nationale party.

On December 14, 1975, he founded the Parti National Populaire with Fabien Roy, a member of the National Assembly who had been expelled from the Ralliement créditiste du Québec. Choquette was confirmed as leader of the party at a party congress on October 24, 1976. He was defeated in Outremont in the November 1976 Quebec election.

Choquette resigned from the PNP on March 29, 1977, and rejoined the Liberal Party on January 16, 1978.

=== Municipal politics ===
Choquette restarted his law career in 1976. From 1983 to 1991, he served as mayor of the Montreal suburb of Outremont.

In 1993, he began a campaign for the leadership of the Civic Party of Montreal, a municipal political party in Montreal, but later withdrew from the race and founded the Parti des Montréalais (Montrealers’ Party). As leader of that party, he was an unsuccessful candidate for mayor of Montreal in 1994, placing third with 13% of the vote.

== See also ==
- Politics of Quebec
- List of Quebec general elections
- List of Quebec leaders of the Opposition
- National Assembly of Quebec
- List of Quebec political parties
