= Alexandre Iracà =

Canadian politician

Member of the National Assembly of Quebec for Papineau
- In office September 4, 2012 – August 29, 2018
- Preceded by: Norman MacMillan
- Succeeded by: Mathieu Lacombe

Personal details
- Born: July 7, 1970 (age 55) Val-d'Or, Quebec, Canada
- Party: Liberal

Alexandre Iracà is a Canadian politician in Quebec, who served in the National Assembly of Quebec for the riding of Papineau from 2012 to 2018. He was first elected in the 2012 election.
