= Mark Assad =

Canadian politician

Mark Joseph Assad

Member of the Canadian Parliament for Gatineau
- In office June 2, 1997 – June 28, 2004
- Preceded by: The electoral district was created in 1996.
- Succeeded by: Françoise Boivin

Member of the Canadian Parliament for Gatineau—La Lièvre
- Preceded by: The electoral district was created in 1987.
- Succeeded by: The electoral district was abolished in 1996.

Member of the National Assembly of Quebec for Papineau
- In office 1981–1988
- Preceded by: Jean Alfred
- Succeeded by: Norman MacMillan

Member of the National Assembly of Quebec for Papineau
- In office 1970–1976
- Preceded by: Roland Théorêt
- Succeeded by: Jean Alfred

Personal details
- Born: Mark Joseph Assad; June 14, 1940 (age 85) Buckingham, Quebec, Canada
- Party: Liberal
- Other political affiliations: Quebec Liberal Party
- Committees: Standing Committee on Public Accounts - Chairman (1997-1999) & Vice-Chairman (1994-1996)
- Portfolio: Parliamentary Secretary to the Minister of Citizenship and Immigration (2000-2003)

Mark Joseph Assad (born June 14, 1940) is a Canadian politician who is a member of the Liberal Party of Canada. He was a member of the House of Commons of Canada representing Gatineau from 1997 to 2004, and represented Gatineau—La Lièvre from 1988 to 1997. He was born in Buckingham, Quebec and is an administrator, and a teacher. He served as the chair of the Standing Committee on Public Accounts. He did not run for re-election in 2004.

== Other political experience ==
Assad was a Liberal Party of Quebec member of the National Assembly of Quebec from 1970 to 1976, and from 1981 to 1988.

== Electoral record (partial) ==
2000 Canadian federal election: Gatineau
| Party | Candidate | Votes | % | ±% | Expenditures |
|---|---|---|---|---|---|
| Liberal | Mark Assad | 25,960 | 51.45 | – | $57,951 |
| Bloc Québécois | Richard Nadeau | 12,817 | 25.40 | | $47,009 |
| Alliance | Stéphany Crowley | 5,069 | 10.05 | | $10,153 |
| Progressive Conservative | Michael F. Vasseur | 3,619 | 7.17 | | $2,547 |
| New Democratic | Carl Hétu | 1,763 | 3.49 | | $13,105 |
| Natural Law | Jean-Claude Pommet | 472 | 0.94 | | none listed |
| Independent | Ronald Bélanger | 389 | 0.77 | | none listed |
| Christian Heritage | Samantha Demers | 228 | 0.45 | | none listed |
| Marxist–Leninist | Françoise Roy | 139 | 0.28 | | none listed |
| Total valid votes/expenditure limit | | 50,456 | 100.00 | – | $ 75,911 |
| Total rejected ballots | | 970 | | | |
| Turnout | | 51,426 | 56.49 | | |
| Electors on the lists | | 91,031 | | | |
Sources: Official Results, Elections Canada and Financial Returns, Elections Canada.

1997 Canadian federal election: Gatineau
| Party | Candidate | Votes | % | Expenditures |
|---|---|---|---|---|
| Liberal | Mark Assad | 25,298 | 46.42 | $59,779 |
| Progressive Conservative | Richard Côté | 15,786 | 28.97 | $54,763 |
| Bloc Québécois | Christian Picard | 11,391 | 20.90 | $27,240 |
| New Democratic | Michelle Bonner | 982 | 1.80 | $0 |
| Natural Law | Jean-Claude Pommet | 448 | 0.82 | $729 |
| Christian Heritage | Claude Grant | 445 | 0.82 | $4,997 |
| Marxist–Leninist | Françoise Roy | 150 | 0.28 | $0 |
| Total valid votes/expenditure limit | | 54,500 | 100.00 | $69,003 |
| Total rejected ballots | | 1,493 | | |
| Turnout | | 55,993 | 66.61 | |
| Electors on the lists | | 84,066 | | |
Sources: Official Results, Elections Canada and Financial Returns, Elections Canada.
