= Norman MacMillan (politician) =

Canadian politician, businessman, and insurance agent

Member of the National Assembly of Quebec for Papineau
- In office September 25, 1989 – September 4, 2012
- Preceded by: Mark Assad
- Succeeded by: Alexandre Iracà

Personal details
- Born: December 14, 1947 (age 78) Buckingham, Quebec
- Party: Quebec Liberal Party
- Spouse: Marie-Laure Chenier
- Profession: businessman, insurance agent
- Cabinet: Delegate Minister for Transportation

Normand MacMillan (born December 14, 1947, in Buckingham, Quebec) is a Quebec politician, businessman and insurance agent. He was the MNA for the riding of Papineau in the Outaouais region between 1989 and 2012, representing the Quebec Liberal Party. He was the government's Chief Whip from 2005 to 2012, and President of the Caucus Chair from 2003 to 2005.

== Career ==
Prior to his political career, MacMillan worked as an insurance agent between 1969 and 1972. He was also the owner of a hotel from 1972 to 1983 and the co-owner of Nord MacMillan Inc. in 2003 which operates the same hotel business. He was also the Chair of the Economic Development Committee for the region and also a city councillor for the former city of Buckingham in the 1980s.

In addition to being involved in the economic development of the Buckingham and La Lievre region, MacMillan was involved in the community as he is a member of the Knights of Columbus Buckingham Division since 1968 and the member of the Lions Club since 1973. He also founded a Junior A hockey club, les Castors de Buckingham, in 1973. MacMillan entered provincial politics as he was elected MNA for Papineau in a by-election in 1989 although he was a member of the Liberal Party since 1980. He was re-elected in 1994, 1998, 2003 and 2007. After being briefly the president of the government's caucus, he was named the government's chief whip in 2005.

On December 7, 2007, MacMillan was diagnosed with prostate cancer after multiple tests and received treatment during the first quarter of 2008. He said that he had no plans to retire from politics.

Following his win in 2008, MacMillan was named the Delegate Minister for Transportation, an assistant position to the main minister Julie Boulet.

MacMillan is married and has two children.

He announced in July 2012 that he would not run in the general election in September 2012.

MacMillan is also known for having called his political opponent Sylvie Roy "grosse crisse".

== Electoral record (partial) ==
2007 Quebec general election: Papineau
Party	Candidate	Votes	%	±%
Liberal	Norman MacMillan	13,559	39.05	
Parti Québécois	Gilles Hébert	9,353	26.94	
Action démocratique	Serge Charette	9,115	26.25	
Green	Patrick Mailloux	1,654	4.76	–
Québec solidaire	Marie-Élaine Rouleau	1,039	2.99	
Total valid votes		34,720	100.00	
Rejected and declined votes		320		
Turnout		35,040	64.62	
Electors on the lists		54,221		

2003 Quebec general election: Papineau
Party	Candidate	Votes	%	±%
Liberal	Norman MacMillan	17,933	58.02	
Parti Québécois	Gilles Hébert	8,279	26.79	
Action démocratique	Serge Charette	3,833	12.40	
Green	Nathalie Gratton	576	1.86	–
UFP	Dominique Marceau	286	0.93	–
Total valid votes		30,907	100.00	
Rejected and declined votes		342		
Turnout		31,249	61.03	
Electors on the lists		51,202		

Political offices
Preceded by Yvon Vallieres	Chief Whip of the Quebec Liberal Party; 2005–2008	Succeeded by Pierre Moreau
Preceded by Benoit Pelletier	Minister responsible for Outaouais region 2008–2012	Succeeded by Stéphane Bergeron
