= Pontiac–Témiscamingue (provincial electoral district) =

Coordinates: 47.1°N 78.8°W

Pontiac-Témiscamingue
Quebec electoral district

Defunct provincial electoral district
- Legislature: National Assembly of Quebec
- District created: 1972
- District abolished: 1980
- First contested: 1973
- Last contested: 1976

Pontiac-Témiscamingue was a former provincial electoral district in Quebec, Canada that elected members to the National Assembly of Quebec.

It was created for the 1973 election, from parts of the existing Pontiac and Témiscamingue electoral districts. Its final election was in 1976. It disappeared in the 1981 election and its successor electoral district was the re-created Pontiac.

== Members of the National Assembly ==
Legislature	Years	Member	Party
Riding created from Pontiac and Témiscamingue
30th	1973–1976	Jean-Guy Larivière	Liberal
31st	1976–1981	Jean-Guy Larivière	Liberal
Dissolved into Pontiac and Rouyn-Noranda–Témiscamingue

== Electoral results ==
1980 Quebec referendum
Side	Votes	%
Non	16,476	74.66
Oui	5,591	25.34

1976 Quebec general election
Party	Candidate	Votes	%	±%
Liberal	Jean-Guy Larivière	8,149	43.57	-17.82
Union Nationale	Jean-Rock Bernard	4,568	24.42	+16.21
Parti Québécois	Jean-Robert Seguier	3,209	17.15	+8.83
Ralliement créditiste	Emmanuel Pétrin	2,141	11.45	-10.63
Independent	Richard Bowie	638	3.41	–
Total valid votes		14,601	–	–
Liberal hold		Swing		-17.02

1973 Quebec general election
Party	Candidate	Votes	%
Liberal	Jean-Guy Larivière	10,269	61.39
Parti créditiste	Emmanuel Pétrin	3,693	22.08
Parti Québécois	Simone Dénommé-Denis	1,392	8.32
Union Nationale	Éric Bélanger	1,373	8.21
Total valid votes		16,727	–
