= Parti national populaire =

Defunct political party in Quebec

Popular National Party Parti National Populaire
- Founded: 1975
- Dissolved: 1979
- Ideology: Liberalism; Populism
- Colours: Gray and Red

The Parti national populaire (French pronunciation: [paʁti nɑsjɔnal pɔpylɛːʁ]; PNP; English: "Popular National Party") was a minor political party in Quebec, Canada that operated in the 1970s.

The PNP was created by a split in the Ralliement créditiste du Québec after Fabien Roy was expelled from the party. Roy was one of the two créditiste Members of the National Assembly (MNAs) that were elected in the 1973 Quebec general election.

On December 14, 1975, Roy teamed up with former Liberal minister Jérôme Choquette to form the Parti national populaire under Choquette's leadership. In August 1976, the PNP and the conservative Union Nationale party, led by Rodrigue Biron, announced the merger of their two parties, but the idea was abandoned by the Union Nationale one month later.

In the November 15, 1976 general elections, Fabien Roy was the only PNP candidate elected, while Choquette was defeated, placing third in his riding with 14.2% of the vote, behind the Liberal and Parti Québécois candidates. Choquette resigned as party leader on March 29, 1977, and was succeeded by Roy.

Roy was appointed leader of the federal Social Credit Party of Canada on March 30, 1979, and resigned his National Assembly seat on April 5, 1979.

The PNP ceased its activities in 1980, and its status as an authorized political party was revoked by the Director-General of Elections for Québec on 31 December 1983.

== Proposed merger with Union Nationale ==
On August 3, 1976, the UN leader in the National Assembly, Maurice Bellemare, leaked to the media that the UN and the PNP had been holding secret negotiations for several weeks to create a single regrouping of conservative, federalist forces. The negotiations were aimed at developing a new name, policy, party structures and financing. Bellemare had suggested "Union Nationale Populaire". Bellemare told reporters that Jérôme Choquette would serve as parliamentary leader of the new party, and UN party leader Rodrigue Biron would serve as party leader.

Choquette's PNP movement had failed to catch on, and Biron's leadership of the UN had not been successful. Choquette was described by the Montreal Gazette as a “leader without a party”, while the UN was described as “a party without a leader”.

The next day, the Montreal Gazette reported that Choquette would be named “interim leader”, responsible for developing the new party's policy and program, while Biron would be responsible for administrative and organizational issues. Officially, the two leaders would be considered equals, and each would continue to lead his own party until the new party's leadership convention, scheduled for October 1976, but it had become clear that Choquette had the support of Bellemare. Choquette was described as Quebec's third most popular political leader in a Montreal Gazette editorial Bellemare was the UN's sole Member of the National Assembly. The party's $750,000 election fund was controlled by Mario Beaulieu, a Bellemare loyalist. Bellemare was seen as using Choquette to push Biron out of the UN leadership without getting blood on his own hands.

A dispute between Biron and Choquette emerged quickly. Biron favoured eliminating Bill 22, the language law that established French as the sole official language of Quebec, and required that children whose parents were not educated in English be educated in French. Choquette, on the other hand, had quit the Liberal Cabinet because he wanted stricter enforcement of the education rules. The dispute erupted, however, when Choquette changed his position, and spoke out in favour of allowing parents to have the choice of language of instruction, saying that it would be impossible to regulate parents’ choices. Biron, who favoured applying the rule only to non-Anglophone immigrants, said that Choquette “went too far” and that he would seek a revision to Choquette's statement. Biron went further, and stated that as he had been elected leader of the UN “with a great majority”, he would continue in that role into the election and past it and that the new party would be called the Union Nationale, indicating that the PNP would be absorbed by the UN, rather than a merger creating a new party.

The merger attempt was called off in September 1976.

== 1976 election ==
The 1976 election caught the PNP by surprise, and it lacked local organization, money and a platform. The party quickly assembled a mainstream platform by drawing heavily from those of other parties, especially the Union Nationale. Choquette presented the party as being a liberal party: “The present government has forgotten the principles of liberalism for which it stands. The new party that I represent becomes the true liberal party, not in name, but in deeds.”

Of the PNP's candidates, only two won more than 1,000 votes: Fabien Roy who was re-elected with 17,600 (69% of the total) in Beauce-Sud, and Choquette, who won only 3,726 votes (14% of the total) in his former riding of Outremont.

== Leaders ==
- Jérôme Choquette - December 14, 1975 to March 29, 1977
- Fabien Roy - March 1977 - April 5, 1979

== Election results ==
General election	# of candidates	# of seats won	% of popular vote
1976	36	1	0.92%

== See also ==
- Ralliement créditiste du Québec
- Politics of Quebec
- List of Quebec general elections
- List of Quebec premiers
- List of Quebec leaders of the Opposition
- National Assembly of Quebec
- Timeline of Quebec history
- Political parties in Quebec
