= Regroupement des militants syndicaux =

The Regroupement des militants syndicaux or RMS (in English: Trade-Union Militants Grouping) was a political organization founded in 1974 by members of the Groupe socialiste des travailleurs du Québec involved in the three main trade-unions in Quebec (FTQ, CSN and CEQ) to rally trade unionists into political action.

On the political scene, the RMS was deeply involved in the creation of a left-of-centre political party in Montreal, the Rassemblement des citoyens de Montréal (Montreal Citizens Movement) in 1974. It also initiated with the Nouveau Parti démocratique du Québec a coalition that contested seats in the 1976 Quebec general election.

The RMS ended its activities in 1981.

== See also ==
- Coalition New Democratic Party of Quebec - Regroupement des militants syndicaux candidates, 1976 Quebec provincial election
- Politics of Quebec
- List of political parties in Canada#Quebec
