= Jean Alfred =

Canadian politician (1940–2015)

Member of the National Assembly of Quebec for Papineau
- In office 1976–1981
- Preceded by: Mark Assad
- Succeeded by: Mark Assad

Personal details
- Born: March 10, 1940 Ouanaminthe, Haiti
- Died: July 20, 2015 (aged 75) Gatineau, Quebec, Canada
- Party: Parti Québécois

Jean Alfred, Ph.D. (March 10, 1940 – July 20, 2015) was a politician in Quebec, Canada. He was the first Black person to be elected to the National Assembly of Quebec as a member of the Parti Québécois from 1976 to 1981.

Alfred was born in Ouanaminthe, Haiti, to Oracius Alfred and Prunelie Occean. He completed his college studies and some university courses at Port-au-Prince before moving to Ottawa, where he obtained a degree in philosophy from the University of Ottawa. He also received a master's degree in psycho-pedagogy as well as a Ph.D. in education.

Prior to his entry into politics, he taught for several years in Haiti and in the Outaouais region. He taught again after his political career and was a school board commissioner for the Commission Scolaire des Draveurs.

In 1975, he was elected as a councillor for Gatineau City Council and later entered provincial politics where he was elected in Papineau as a Parti Québécois candidate, becoming the first Black person to be elected to the National Assembly of Quebec. He served a full term as a PQ and Independent member but was defeated in the newly formed riding of Chapleau which portions were split from Gatineau and Papineau. He was a candidate again in 1989, but lost to the Liberal, John Kehoe. He made a brief attempt at federal politics but failed to become a Bloc Québécois prior to the 1997 elections.

== Electoral record (partial) ==
1976 Quebec general election: Papineau
Party	Candidate	Votes	%
Parti Québécois	Jean Alfred	12,967	36.32
Liberal	Normand Racicot	12,900	36.16
Union Nationale	Sylvio Huneault	7,483	20.96
Rassemblement Créditiste Populaire	Herbert Carriere	1,974	5.45
National populaire	Gilbert Dupuis	409	1.14
Source: Résultats des élections générales du 15 novembre 1976, Élections du Québec.

1981 Quebec general election: Chapleau
Party	Candidate	Votes	%
Liberal	John Kehoe	15,364	53.44
Parti Québécois	Jean Alfred	12,880	44.80
Union Nationale	André Lortie	413	1.44
Marxist–Leninist	Christine Dandenault	95	0.33
Total valid votes		28,752	100.00
Rejected and declined votes		237	
Turnout		28,989	76.41
Electors on the lists		37,937	
Source: Official Results, Le Directeur général des élections du Québec.
