= John Kehoe (Quebec politician) =

Canadian politician

John J. Kehoe (October 20, 1934 – February 4, 2024) was a lawyer and politician in Quebec. He represented Chapleau in the National Assembly of Quebec from 1981 to 1994 as a Liberal member.

He was born in Gatineau, the son of William Kehoe and Mary Murphy, and was educated at the University of Ottawa and at McGill University, where he received at BCL in 1959. He was called to the Quebec bar in 1960 and entered practice with Roy Fournier, opening his own office the following year. From 1960 to 1966, he was crown lawyer for the social welfare court at Hull. He was solicitor for the city of Gatineau from 1964 to 1981. Kehoe was crown lawyer for the Hull district court from 1971 to 1974. He was also a member of the Gatineau Chamber of Commerce and of the Knights of Columbus.

Kehoe served as parliamentary assistant to the Quebec Minister of Justice from 1991 to 1994. He did not run for reelection in 1994.

== Electoral record (partial) ==
1981 Quebec general election: Chapleau
Party	Candidate	Votes	%
Liberal	John Kehoe	15,364	53.44
Parti Québécois	Jean Alfred	12,880	44.80
Union Nationale	André Lortie	413	1.44
Marxist–Leninist	Christine Dandenault	95	0.33
Total valid votes		28,752	100.00
Rejected and declined votes		237	
Turnout		28,989	76.41
Electors on the lists		37,937	
Source: Official Results, Le Directeur général des élections du Québec.
