= Papineau (provincial electoral district) =

Provincial electoral district in Quebec, Canada

Coordinates: 45°45′N 75°10′W

Quebec electoral district

Provincial electoral district
- Legislature: National Assembly of Quebec
MNA
Isabelle Millette
Parti Québécois
- District created: 1922
- First contested: 1923
- Last contested: 2026

Demographics
- Electors (2012): 56,601
- Area (km²): 3,648.1
- Census subdivision(s): Gatineau (part), Boileau, Bowman, Chénéville, Duhamel, Fassett, Lac-des-Plages, Lac-Simon, L'Ange-Gardien, Lochaber, Lochaber-Partie-Ouest, Mayo, Montebello, Montpellier, Mulgrave-et-Derry, Namur, Notre-Dame-de-Bonsecours, Notre-Dame-de-la-Paix, Notre-Dame-de-la-Salette, Papineauville, Plaisance, Ripon, Saint-André-Avellin, Saint-Émile-de-Suffolk, Saint-Sixte, Thurso, Val-des-Bois

Papineau (French pronunciation: [papino]) is a provincial electoral district located in the Outaouais region of Quebec, Canada, which elects members to the National Assembly. It notably includes part of the City of Gatineau as well as the municipalities of L'Ange-Gardien, Saint-André-Avellin, Thurso and Papineauville.

It was created for the 1923 election from part of Labelle.

In the change from the 2001 to the 2011 electoral map, it lost Val-des-Monts to Gatineau electoral district but gained some territory in the city of Gatineau from Chapleau electoral district.

The constituency or “riding” was named after Louis-Joseph Papineau, Canadian politician and leader of the Quebec Patriotes in the 19th century.

== Members of the Legislative Assembly / National Assembly ==
Legislature	Years	Member	Party
Riding created from Labelle
16th	1923–1927	Désiré Lahaie	Liberal
17th	1927–1931	Désiré Lahaie	Liberal
18th	1931–1935	Désiré Lahaie	Liberal
19th	1935–1936	Roméo Lorrain	Action libérale nationale
20th	1936–1939	Roméo Lorrain	Union Nationale
21st	1939–1944	Roméo Lorrain	Union Nationale
22nd	1944–1948	Roméo Lorrain	Union Nationale
23rd	1948–1952	Roméo Lorrain	Union Nationale
24th	1952–1956	Roméo Lorrain	Union Nationale
25th	1956–1960	Roméo Lorrain	Union Nationale
26th	1960–1962	Roméo Lorrain	Union Nationale
27th	1962–1966	Roméo Lorrain	Union Nationale
28th	1966–1970	Roland Théorêt	Union Nationale
29th	1970–1973	Mark Assad	Liberal
30th	1973–1976	Mark Assad	Liberal
31st	1976–1981	Jean Alfred	Parti Québécois
32nd	1981–1985	Mark Assad	Liberal
33rd	1985–1988	Mark Assad	Liberal
33rd	1989–1989	Norman MacMillan	Liberal
34th	1989–1994	Norman MacMillan	Liberal
35th	1994–1998	Norman MacMillan	Liberal
36th	1998–2003	Norman MacMillan	Liberal
37th	2003–2007	Norman MacMillan	Liberal
38th	2007–2008	Norman MacMillan	Liberal
39th	2008–2012	Norman MacMillan	Liberal
40th	2012–2014	Alexandre Iracà	Liberal
41st	2014–2018	Alexandre Iracà	Liberal
42nd	2018–2022	Mathieu Lacombe	Coalition Avenir Québec
43rd	2022–2026	Mathieu Lacombe	Coalition Avenir Québec
44th	2026–Present	Isabelle Millette	Parti Québécois

== Election results ==
2026 Quebec general election
** Preliminary results — Not yet official **
Party	Candidate	Votes	%	±%
Parti Québécois	Isabelle Millette	11,181	30.17	
Liberal	Isabelle Sabourin	10,625	28.67	
Conservative	Michel Kadri	8,143	21.97	
Coalition Avenir Québec	Linda Gauthier	4,167	11.24	
Québec solidaire	Benoit Renaud	2,625	7.08	
Independent	Julie Gomez	316	0.85	
Total valid votes				
Total rejected ballots				
Turnout			61.65	
Electors on the lists			–	–
Source: Élections Québec

2022 Quebec general election
Party	Candidate	Votes	%	±%
Coalition Avenir Québec	Mathieu Lacombe	19,791	52.83	+5.9
Québec solidaire	Marie-Claude Latourelle	5,164	13.78	-1.24
Conservative	Marc Carrière	4,970	13.27	+11.99
Parti Québécois	Audrey-Ann Chicoine	3,834	10.23	-0.35
Liberal	Wittlyn Kate Semervil	3,151	8.41	-14.70
Green	Melissa Arbour	450	1.20	-0.31
Démocratie directe	Cédric Brazeau	104	0.28	–
Total valid votes		37,464	98.99	–
Total rejected ballots		383	1.01	–
Turnout		37,847	59.44	
Electors on the lists		63,674		

2018 Quebec general election
Party	Candidate	Votes	%	±%
Coalition Avenir Québec	Mathieu Lacombe	16,975	46.93	+22.28
Liberal	Alexandre Iracà	8,358	23.11	-27.24
Québec solidaire	Mélanie Pilon-Gauvin	5,434	15.02	+8.34
Parti Québécois	Yves Destroismaisons	3,828	10.58	-14.07
Green	Michel Tardif	547	1.51	
Conservative	Joanne Godin	463	1.28	
Citoyens au pouvoir	Lynn Boyer	252	0.7	
Parti nul	Isabelle Yde	227	0.63	-0.74
Parti 51	Claude Flaus	84	0.23	
Total valid votes		36,168	98.78	
Total rejected ballots		446	1.22	
Turnout		36,614	60.88	
Eligible voters		60,137		
Coalition Avenir Québec gain from Liberal		Swing		+24.76
Source(s) "Rapport des résultats officiels du scrutin". Élections Québec.

2014 Quebec general election
Party	Candidate	Votes	%	±%
Liberal	Alexandre Iracà	18,330	50.35	+15.59
Parti Québécois	Jean-François Primeau	8,975	24.65	–9.66
Coalition Avenir Québec	René Langelier	5,860	16.10	–5.88
Québec solidaire	Marc Sarazin	2,432	6.68	+1.43
Parti nul	Christine Gagné	498	1.37	+0.18
Option nationale	Jonathan Beauchamp	309	0.85	–0.69
Total valid votes		36,404	100.0	
Total rejected ballots		455	1.23	
Turnout		36,859	63.55	
Eligible voters		57,999		
Liberal hold		Swing		+12.62
Source: Élections Québec

2012 Quebec general election
Party	Candidate	Votes	%	±%
Liberal	Alexandre Iracà	12,966	34.76	-16.60
Parti Québécois	Jean-François Primeau	12,829	34.31	+2.46
Coalition Avenir Québec	Chantal Dubé	8,218	21.98	+11.44
Québec solidaire	Katia Gagnon	1,963	5.25	+2.33
Option nationale	Jonathan Beauchamp	574	1.54	
Parti nul	Christine Gagné	446	1.19	
Independent	Mario Parent	246	0.66	
People's Front	Alexandre Deschênes	115	0.31	-0.02
Liberal hold		Swing		-9.53

2008 Quebec general election
Party	Candidate	Votes	%	±%
Liberal	Normand MacMillan	13,786	50.94	
Parti Québécois	Gilles Hebert	8,674	32.05	
Action démocratique	Bruno Lemieux	2,825	10.44	
Québec solidaire	Francois Breault	805	2.97	
Green	Patrick Mailloux	790	2.92	–
People's Front	Christian-Simon Ferlatte	92	0.34	

2007 Quebec general election
Party	Candidate	Votes	%	±%
Liberal	Normand MacMillan	13,559	39.05	-18.97
Parti Québécois	Gilles Hebert	9,353	26.94	+0.15
Action démocratique	Serge Charette	9,115	26.25	+13.85
Green	Patrick Mailloux	1,654	4.76	+2.93
Québec solidaire	Marie-Elaine Rouleau	1,039	2.99	

2003 Quebec general election
Party	Candidate	Votes	%	±%
Liberal	Normand MacMillan	17,933	58.02	+3.24
Parti Québécois	Gilles Hebert	8,279	26.79	-11.42
Action démocratique	Serge Charette	3,833	12.40	+6.92
Green	Nathalie Gratton	576	1.86	–
UFP	Dominique Marceau	286	0.93	–

1998 Quebec general election
Party	Candidate	Votes	%	±%
Liberal	Normand MacMillan	16,025	54.78	+1.11
Parti Québécois	Benoit Campeau	11,177	38.21	-3.43
Action démocratique	Gheorghe Irimia	1,604	5.48	+2.51
Natural Law	Richard Lauzon	128	0.44	-0.19
PDS	Patrick Aube	126	0.43	
Lemon	Denis Patenaude	114	0.39	-0.69
People's Front	Jose Bazin	81	0.28	

1995 Quebec referendum
Side	Votes	%
Non	21,517	63.49
Oui	12,371	36.51

1994 Quebec general election
Party	Candidate	Votes	%	±%
Liberal	Normand MacMillan	15,084	53.67	+2.99
Parti Québécois	Paul-Andre David	11,703	41.64	-6.29
Action démocratique	Gaetan Lavoie	836	2.97	
Lemon	Sylvie Gregoire	303	1.08	
Natural Law	Claude Cote	178	0.63	
People's Front	Jose Bazin	81	0.28	-1.11

1989 Quebec general election
Party	Candidate	Votes	%	±%
Liberal	Normand MacMillan	11,313	50.68	-1.50
Parti Québécois	Paul-Andre David	10,701	47.93	+2.64
People's Front	Nicole Leblanc	310	1.39	+0.52

By-election – May 29, 1989
Party	Candidate	Votes	%	±%
Liberal	Normand MacMillan	7,758	52.18	-6.41
Parti Québécois	Paul-Andre David	6,733	45.29	+7.32
Lemon	Denis Patenaude	248	1,67	
People's Front	Nicole Leblanc	129	0.87	

== See also ==
- List of Quebec provincial electoral districts
- Canadian provincial electoral districts
