= André Raynauld =

Canadian politician

MNA for Outremont
- In office 1976–1980
- Preceded by: Jérôme Choquette
- Succeeded by: Pierre Fortier

Personal details
- Born: October 20, 1927 Sainte-Anne-de-la-Pocatière, Quebec
- Died: April 11, 2011 (aged 83) Montreal, Quebec, Canada
- Party: Liberal

André Raynauld, OC (October 20, 1927 – April 11, 2011) was a Canadian politician, who represented the electoral district of Outremont in the National Assembly of Quebec from 1976 to 1980. He was a member of the Quebec Liberal Party.

Prior to his election, he was an economics professor at the Université de Montréal.
