= Fabien Cordeau =

Canadian politician

Member of the National Assembly of Quebec for Saint-Hyacinthe
- In office 1976–1981
- Preceded by: Fernand Cornellier
- Succeeded by: Maurice Dupré

Personal details
- Born: March 24, 1923 Saint-Pie, Quebec
- Died: September 27, 2007 (aged 84) Saint-Hyacinthe, Quebec
- Party: Union Nationale

Fabien Cordeau (March 24, 1923 – September 27, 2007) was a politician in Quebec, Canada.

== Background ==
He was born on March 24, 1923, in Saint-Pie, Quebec.

== City Councillor ==
Cordeau served as a city councillor in Saint-Hyacinthe from 1973 to 1988.

== Member of the legislature ==
He ran as a Union Nationale candidate to the provincial legislature in the district of Saint-Hyacinthe in the 1976 election and won against both Liberal incumbent Fernand Cornellier and Parti Québécois (PQ) candidate Charles-Henri Tremblay. He lost the 1981 election against PQ candidate Maurice Dupré.

== Death ==
Cordeau died on September 27, 2007.
