= Outremont (provincial electoral district) =

Quebec electoral district

Defunct provincial electoral district
- Legislature: National Assembly of Quebec
- District created: 1965
- First contested: 1966
- Last contested: 2014

Demographics
- Population (2006): 64,528
- Electors (2014): 39,580
- Area (km²): 9.4
- Census division(s): Montreal (part)
- Census subdivision(s): Montreal (part)

Outremont (French pronunciation: [utʁəmɔ̃]) was a provincial electoral district in the city of Montreal in Quebec, Canada. It comprised all of the borough of Outremont and parts of the boroughs of Le Plateau-Mont-Royal (part of Mile End), Côte-des-Neiges–Notre-Dame-de-Grâce (part of Côte-des-Neiges) and a very small part of Ville-Marie.

It was created for the 1966 election from parts of Montréal-Outremont and Westmount–Saint-Georges electoral districts.

In the change from the 2001 to the 2011 electoral map, its territory was unchanged. A by-election took place on December 9, 2013, in which Philippe Couillard, leader of the Quebec Liberal Party, won over 50 percent of votes.

Following the change in the 2017 electoral map, the riding was dissolved into D'Arcy-McGee, Mercier and the new riding of Mont-Royal–Outremont.

== Members of the Legislative Assembly / National Assembly ==
Legislature	Years	Member	Party
Riding created from Montréal-Outremont and Westmount–Saint-Georges
28th	1966–1970	Jérôme Choquette	Liberal
29th	1970–1973	Jérôme Choquette	Liberal
30th	1973–1975	Jérôme Choquette	Liberal
30th	1975–1975	Jérôme Choquette	Independent
30th	1975–1976	Jérôme Choquette	Parti national populaire
31st	1976–1980	André Raynauld	Liberal
31st	1980–1981	Pierre Fortier	Liberal
32nd	1981–1985	Pierre Fortier	Liberal
33rd	1985–1989	Pierre Fortier	Liberal
34th	1989–1994	Gérald Tremblay	Liberal
35th	1994–1996	Gérald Tremblay	Liberal
35th	1996–1998	Pierre-Étienne Laporte	Liberal
36th	1998–2003	Pierre-Étienne Laporte	Liberal
37th	2003–2005	Yves Séguin	Liberal
37th	2005–2007	Raymond Bachand	Liberal
38th	2007–2008	Raymond Bachand	Liberal
39th	2008–2012	Raymond Bachand	Liberal
40th	2012–2013	Raymond Bachand	Liberal
40th	2013–2014	Philippe Couillard	Liberal
41st	2014–2018	Hélène David	Liberal
Dissolved into Mont-Royal–Outremont

== Election results ==
2014 Quebec general election
Party	Candidate	Votes	%	±%
Liberal	Hélène David	15,368	56.34	+14.83
Québec solidaire	Édith Laperle	4,621	16.94	−1.07
Parti Québécois	Roxanne Gendron	3,993	14.64	−8.56
Coalition Avenir Québec	Rebecca McCann	2,252	8.26	−5.74
Green	Théo Brière	615	2.25	
Parti nul	Mathieu Marcil	192	0.70	-0.22
Option nationale	Galia Vaillancourt	154	0.56	−1.15
Conservative	Simon Pouliot	80	0.29	
Total valid votes		27,275	99.21	–
Total rejected ballots		218	0.79	-0.13
Turnout		27,493	69.46	+1.25
Electors on the lists		39,580	–	–
Liberal hold		Swing		+7.95
Source: Official Results, Le directeur général des élections du Québec. The percentage changes are in relation to the 2012 Quebec general election.

Quebec provincial by-election, December 9, 2013
Party	Candidate	Votes	%	±%
Liberal	Philippe Couillard	5,582	55.11	+13.59
Québec solidaire	Édith Laperle	3,264	32.23	+14.21
Option nationale	Julie Surprenant	677	6.68	+4.97
Green	Alex Tyrrell	384	3.79	–
Conservative	Pierre Ennio Crespi	145	1.43	–
Parti nul	Mathieu Marcil	59	0.58	−0.34
Équipe Autonomiste	Guy Boivin	17	0.17	–
Total valid votes		10,128	99.13	–
Total rejected ballots		89	0.87	–
Turnout		10,217	26.42	−41.79
Electors on the lists		38,671	–	–
Liberal hold		Swing		−0.41

2012 Quebec general election
Party	Candidate	Votes	%	±%
Liberal	Raymond Bachand	10,949	41.52	−12.69
Parti Québécois	Roxanne Gendron	6,119	23.20	−2.03
Québec solidaire	Édith Laperle	4,751	18.02	+6.59
Coalition Avenir Québec	Claude Michaud	3,691	14.00	+11.04*
Option nationale	Luc Séguin	451	1.71	–
Parti nul	Mathieu Marcil	243	0.92	–
Quebec Citizens' Union	Jonathan Moffatt	120	0.46	–
Coalition pour la Constituante	Olga Sharonova	47	0.18	–
Total valid votes		26,371	99.08	–
Total rejected ballots		245	0.92	–
Turnout		26,616	68.21	+19.72
Electors on the lists		39,022	–	–
Liberal hold		Swing		−5.33

* Result compared to Action démocratique

2008 Quebec general election
Party	Candidate	Votes	%	±%
Liberal	Raymond Bachand	10,569	54.21	+7.18
Parti Québécois	Sophie Fréchette	4,920	25.23	+1.73
Québec solidaire	May Chiu	2,228	11.43	+2.30
Green	Maxime Simard	1,204	6.17	−4.63
Action démocratique	Christian Collard	577	2.96	−5.91
Total valid votes		19,498	98.96	–
Total rejected ballots		204	1.04	–
Turnout		19,702	48.49	−14.20
Electors on the lists		40,627	–	–

2007 Quebec general election
Party	Candidate	Votes	%	±%
Liberal	Raymond Bachand	11,861	47.03	
Parti Québécois	Salim Laaroussi	5,928	23.50	
Green	Luc Côté	2,725	10.80	–
Québec solidaire	Sujata Dey	2,303	9.13	
Action démocratique	Pierre Harvey	2,236	8.87	
Independent	Romain Angeles	101	0.40	
Marxist–Leninist	Yvon Breton	68	0.27	
Total valid votes		25,222	99.35	
Total rejected ballots		166	0.65	
Turnout		25,388	62.69	
Electors on the lists		40,498		
Source: Official Results, Le Directeur général des élections du Québec.

Quebec provincial by-election, December 12, 2005
Party	Candidate	Votes	%	±%
Liberal	Raymond Bachand	8,172	48.79	
Parti Québécois	Farouk Karim	6,242	37.27	
UFP	Omar Aktouf	1,212	7.24	–
Green	Christopher Coggan	750	4.48	–
Action démocratique	Raya Mileva	338	2.02	
Independent	Régent Millette	35	0.21	
Total valid votes		16,749	100.00	
Rejected and declined votes		89		
Turnout		16,838	40.28	
Electors on the lists		41,799		
