= Pierre Fortier =

Canadian politician (1932–2019)

MNA for Outremont
- In office 1980–1989
- Preceded by: André Raynauld
- Succeeded by: Gérald Tremblay

Personal details
- Born: November 15, 1932 Montreal, Quebec
- Died: June 22, 2019 (aged 86) Montreal, Quebec
- Party: Liberal

Pierre Fortier (French pronunciation: [pjɛʁ fɔʁtje]; November 15, 1932 – June 22, 2019) was a Canadian politician, who represented the electoral district of Outremont in the National Assembly of Quebec from 1980 to 1989. He was a member of the Quebec Liberal Party.
