= Viger (electoral district) =

Coordinates: 45.55°N 73.57°W

Quebec electoral district

Defunct provincial electoral district
- Legislature: National Assembly of Quebec
- District created: 1980
- District abolished: 2001
- First contested: 1981
- Last contested: 2002 (by-election)

Demographics
- Census division: Montreal (part)
- Census subdivision: Montreal (part)

Viger was a provincial electoral district in Quebec, Canada.

It consisted of part of the then city of Saint-Léonard later turned borough, Rosemont and Mercier-Est neighbourhoods in Montreal.

It was created for the 1981 election. Its final general election was in 1998; there was also a by-election in 2002. It disappeared in the 2003 election as its territory was carved up and distributed among the new electoral district of Jeanne-Mance–Viger and the existing electoral districts of Anjou, Rosemont and Viau .

It was named jointly for Denis-Benjamin Viger and Jacques Viger, who were prominent politicians in the 1830s and 1840s.

== Members of the National Assembly ==
Legislature	Years	Member	Party
Riding created from Jeanne-Mance and Viau
32nd	1981–1985	Cosmo Maciocia	Liberal
33rd	1985–1989	Cosmo Maciocia	Liberal
34th	1989–1994	Cosmo Maciocia	Liberal
35th	1994–1998	Cosmo Maciocia	Liberal
36th	1998–2001	Cosmo Maciocia	Liberal
36th	2002–2003	Anna Mancuso	Liberal
Dissolved into Jeanne-Mance–Viger, Rosemont, Anjou-Louis-Riel, Viau

== Election results ==
2002 Viger By-election
Party	Candidate	Votes	%	±%
Liberal	Anna Mancuso	8353	72.26	+7.46
Parti Québécois	Claude Villeneuve	1741	15.06	-10.89
Action démocratique	Gaetano Giumento	1245	10.77	+2.57
Green	Adam Jastrzebski	221	1.91	-

1998 Quebec general election
Party	Candidate	Votes	%	±%
Liberal	Cosmo Maciocia	18715	64.80	+0.53
Parti Québécois	Marie Di Corpo	7496	25.95	-3.29
Action démocratique	Jacques Gauthier	2369	8.20	-
Socialist Democracy	Alain Bernatchez	168	0.58	-
Parti innovateur du Québec	Tommy Audet	135	0.47	-

1995 Quebec referendum
Side	Votes	%
Non	23,209	67.88
Oui	10.982	32.12

1994 Quebec general election
Party	Candidate	Votes	%	±%
Liberal	Cosmo Maciocia	18743	64.27	+3.54
Parti Québécois	Umberto Di Genova	8529	29.24	+0.13
New Democratic	Jean-Guy Couture	1485	5.09	-
Natural Law	Denis Lacroix	223	0.76	-
Parti des travailleurs du Québec	Roberto Barba	100	0.34	-
Marxist–Leninist	Claude Brunelle	85	0.29	-

1989 Quebec general election
Party	Candidate	Votes	%	±%
Liberal	Cosmo Maciocia	16847	60.73	-7.66
Parti Québécois	Michel Dupont	8075	29.11	+2.04
Equality	David De Santis	1831	6.60	-
Green	Rolf Bramann	877	3.16	+2.15
Marxist–Leninist	Catherine Commandeur	111	0.40	-

1985 Quebec general election
Party	Candidate	Votes	%	±%
Liberal	Cosmo Maciocia	20060	68.28	+8.83
Parti Québécois	André Normandeau	7954	27.07	-11.71
New Democratic	Renée Sigouin	617	2.10	-
Green	Marius Henry	295	1.01	-
Parti indépendantiste	Jacques Binette	235	0.80	-
Independent	Amin Hachem	131	0.45	-
Christian Socialist	Christian Rivest	86	0.29	-

1981 Quebec general election
Party	Candidate	Votes	%	±%
Liberal	Cosmo Maciocia	18794	59.37	
Parti Québécois	Paul Doyon	12266	38.74	
Union Nationale	J. François Emond	598	1.89	
