= Sainte-Marie (provincial electoral district) =

Coordinates: 45.531°N 73.554°W

Quebec electoral district

Defunct provincial electoral district
- Legislature: National Assembly of Quebec
- District created: 1965
- District abolished: 1988
- First contested: 1966
- Last contested: 1985

Demographics
- Census division(s): Montreal (part)
- Census subdivision(s): Montreal (part)

Sainte-Marie (French pronunciation: [sɛ̃t maʁi]) was a provincial electoral district in the Montreal region of Quebec, Canada.

It corresponded to the Sainte-Marie neighbourhood and eastern Ville-Marie in Montreal.

It was created for the 1966 election from parts of Montréal–Sainte-Marie, Montréal–Saint-Jacques and Maisonneuve electoral districts. Its final election was in 1985. It disappeared in the 1989 election and its successor electoral district was Sainte-Marie–Saint-Jacques.

== Members of the Legislative Assembly / National Assembly ==
Legislature	Years	Member	Party
Riding created from Montréal–Sainte-Marie, Montréal–Saint-Jacques and Maisonneuve
28th	1966–1969	Edgar Charbonneau	Union Nationale
28th	1969–1970	Jean-Jacques Crôteau	Union Nationale
29th	1970–1973	Charles-Henri Tremblay	Parti Québécois
30th	1973–1976	Jean-Claude Malépart	Liberal
31st	1976–1981	Guy Bisaillon	Parti Québécois
32nd	1981–1982	Guy Bisaillon	Parti Québécois
32nd	1982–1985	Guy Bisaillon	Independent
33rd	1985–1989	Michel Laporte	Liberal
Dissolved into Sainte-Marie–Saint-Jacques

== Election results ==
1985 Quebec general election
Party	Candidate	Votes	%	±%
Liberal	Michel Laporte	8,855	47.03	+12.91
Parti Québécois	Yves Dufour	8,400	44.61	-16.74
New Democratic	Louise Boucher	711	3.78	–
Union Nationale	Pierre Desrochers	213	1.13	-1.08
Parti indépendantiste	Christian Dupuy	212	1.13	–
Humanist	Anne Farrell	169	0.90	–
Socialist Movement	Bertrand Des Aulniers	88	0.47	–
Non-Affiliated	Luc Proulx	74	0.39	–
Commonwealth of Canada	Daniel Côté	68	0.36	–
Christian Socialist	Serge Belzile	39	0.21	–
Total valid votes		18,829	97.7	–
Rejected and declined votes		444	2.30	–
Turnout		19,273	67.12	-7.99
Electors on the lists		28,715	–	–
Liberal gain from Parti Québécois		Swing		+14.83
Source: Official Results, Le Directeur général des élections du Québec.

1981 Quebec general election
Party	Candidate	Votes	%
Parti Québécois	Guy Bisaillon (incumbent)	13,667	61.35
Liberal	Jacques Dion	7,600	34.12
Union Nationale	Paul-Émile Gélinas	493	2.21
Workers Communist	Lorraine Rondeau	147	0.66
Independent	Jacques Lavoie	101	0.45
Marxist–Leninist	Claude Brunelle	85	0.38
Workers	Maurice Gohier	63	0.28
United Social Credit	René Paré	43	0.19
Communist	Gaétan Trudel	43	0.19
Independent	Stéphane Verdier	34	0.15
Total valid votes		22,276	98.58
Rejected and declined votes		322	1.42
Turnout		22,598	75.11
Electors on the lists		30,087	
Source: Official Results, Le Directeur général des élections du Québec.
