= Cosmo Maciocia =

Canadian politician

Borough mayor for Rivière-des-Prairies–Pointe-aux-Trembles and Montreal City Counciller
- In office 2005–2009
- Succeeded by: Joe Magri

Member of the National Assembly of Quebec for Viger
- In office 1981–2001
- Preceded by: District was established in 1980
- Succeeded by: Anna Mancuso

Personal details
- Born: February 2, 1942 (age 84) Cantalupo nel Sannio, Italy
- Party: Liberal; Union Montréal
- Children: Alessia

Cosmo Maciocia (born February 2, 1942) is a Canadian politician. He was a member of the National Assembly of Quebec and a city councillor in Montreal, Quebec.

== Background ==
He was born in Cantalupo nel Sannio, Molise, Italy, on February 2, 1942, and arrived in Canada in 1964.

== City councillor in Saint-Léonard ==
He was a city councillor in Saint-Léonard in 1978.

== Member of the legislature ==
He successfully ran as a Liberal candidate to the provincial legislature for the district of Viger in 1981. He was re-elected in 1985, 1989, 1994 and 1998.

He was Parliamentary Assistant from 1985 to 1994.

== Back in city politics ==
In the wake of the province-wide municipal merger of 2001, Maciocia gave up his seat and ran as a candidate of Gérald Tremblay's Montreal Island Citizens Union (French: Union des citoyens et des citoyennes de l'Île de Montréal or UCIM) in the district of Marc-Aurèle-Fortin. The party is now known as Union Montréal.

In 2005, he was elected as borough mayor for Rivière-des-Prairies-Pointe-aux-Trembles-Montréal-Est, and retained his position as mayor of Rivière-des-Prairies–Pointe-aux-Trembles following the 2006 demerger of Montréal-Est.

Maciocia is a member of Montreal's executive committee.

He did not choose to run again in the 2009 Montreal municipal election, but his seat was retained for Union Montréal by Joe Magri.

== Provinical electoral record ==
1998 Quebec general election
Party	Candidate	Votes	%	±%
Liberal	Cosmo Maciocia	18715	64.80	+0.53
Parti Québécois	Marie Di Corpo	7496	25.95	-3.29
Action démocratique	Jacques Gauthier	2369	8.20	-
Socialist Democracy	Alain Bernatchez	168	0.58	-
Parti innovateur du Québec	Tommy Audet	135	0.47	-

1994 Quebec general election: Viger
Party	Candidate	Votes	%	±%
Liberal	Cosmo Maciocia (incumbent)	18,743	64.27	
Parti Québécois	Umberto di Genova	8,529	29.24	
New Democratic	Jean-Guy Couture	1,485	5.09	
Natural Law	Denis Lacroix	223	0.76	
Innovator	Roberto Barba	100	0.34	
Marxist–Leninist	Claude Brunelle	85	0.29	
Total valid votes		29,165	10.00	–
Total rejected ballots		527	2.32	–
Turnout		29,692	84.12	
Electors on the lists		35,299	–	–
Source: Official Results, Le Directeur général des élections du Québec.

1989 Quebec general election: Viger
Party	Candidate	Votes	%
Liberal	Cosmo Maciocia	16,847	60.73
Parti Québécois	Michel Dupont	8,075	29.11
Equality	David De Santis	1,831	6.60
Green	Rolf Bramann	877	3.16
Marxist–Leninist	Catherine Commandeur	111	0.40
Total valid votes		27,741	100.00
Rejected and declined votes		690	
Turnout		28,431	76.27
Electors on the lists		37,275	
Source: Official Results, Le Directeur général des élections du Québec.

1985 Quebec general election
Party	Candidate	Votes	%	±%
Liberal	Cosmo Maciocia	20060	68.28	+8.83
Parti Québécois	André Normandeau	7954	27.07	-11.71
New Democratic	Renée Sigouin	617	2.10	-
Green	Marius Henry	295	1.01	-
Parti indépendantiste	Jacques Binette	235	0.80	-
Independent	Amin Hachem	131	0.45	-
Christian Socialist	Christian Rivest	86	0.29	-

1981 Quebec general election
Party	Candidate	Votes	%	±%
Liberal	Cosmo Maciocia	18794	59.37	
Parti Québécois	Paul Doyon	12266	38.74	
Union Nationale	J. François Emond	598	1.89	

== Municipal ==
2005 Montreal municipal election: Borough Mayor Rivière-des-Prairies–Pointe-aux-Trembles
Party	Candidate	Votes	%	±%
Union Montreal	Cosmo Maciocia	14,113	50.30	
Vision Montreal	Colette Paul	12,189	43.44	
ÉVM	Marius Minier	1,757	6.26	
Total valid votes/expense limit		28,059	100.00	–
Total rejected ballots		N/A	–	–
Turnout		–	–	–
Eligible voters		–	–	–
