= Clifford Lincoln =

Canadian politician (born 1928)

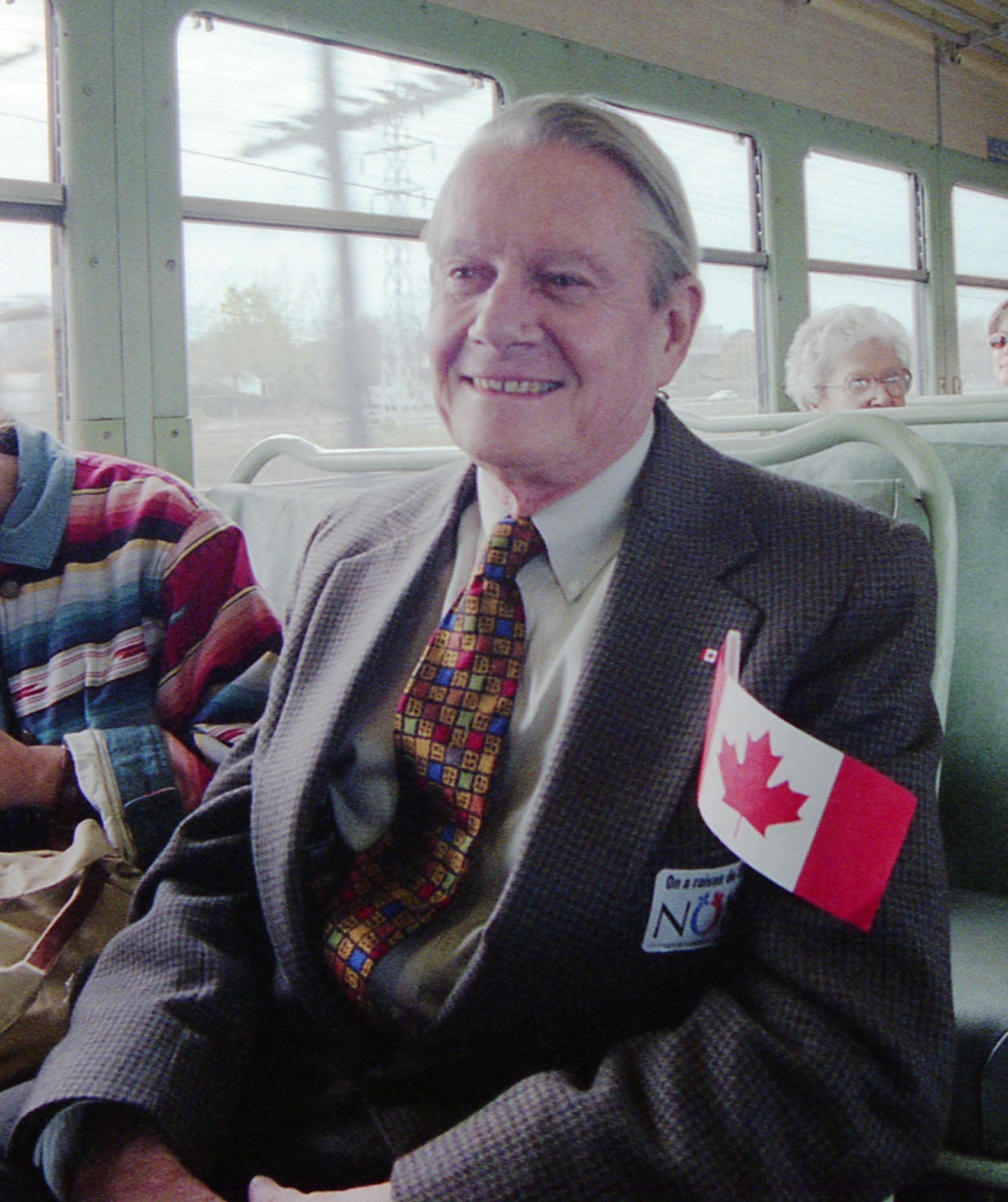
- Lincoln travelling to the Canada Unity Rally in Montreal, October 27, 1995

Member of Parliament for Lac-Saint-Louis Lachine—Lac-Saint-Louis (1993–1997)
- In office October 25, 1993 – June 28, 2004
- Preceded by: Robert Layton
- Succeeded by: Francis Scarpaleggia

Quebec Minister of the Environment
- In office December 12, 1985 – December 21, 1988
- Premier: Robert Bourassa
- Preceded by: Adrien Ouellette
- Succeeded by: Lise Bacon

Member of the National Assembly of Quebec for Nelligan
- In office April 13, 1981 – September 25, 1989
- Preceded by: Riding established
- Succeeded by: Russell Williams

Personal details
- Born: Clifford Albert Lincoln; September 1, 1928 (age 97) Curepipe, British Mauritius
- Party: Liberal (federal); Quebec Liberal (provincial)
- Occupation: Businessman; insurance executive; environmental consultant

Clifford Albert Lincoln (born September 1, 1928) is a Canadian former politician and businessman. He represented Nelligan in the National Assembly of Quebec from 1981 to 1989 and served as Quebec's minister of the environment in the government of Premier Robert Bourassa from 1985 until his resignation from cabinet in 1988. He subsequently represented the Montreal-area ridings of Lachine—Lac-Saint-Louis and Lac-Saint-Louis in the House of Commons of Canada from 1993 to 2004.

== Early life and business career ==
Lincoln was born in Curepipe, Mauritius, in 1928, the son of Francis Lincoln, an administrator, and Régina De Baize. He pursued post-secondary studies in Mauritius and studied insurance through the Insurance Institute of Southern Rhodesia and South Africa in Cape Town. After living for several years in South Africa and Southern Rhodesia, he immigrated to Canada in 1958.

Lincoln initially settled in Montreal and later moved to Vancouver, where he developed a business specializing in international insurance, before returning to Montreal. He became a fellow of the Insurance Institute of Canada in 1961, the Chartered Insurance Institute in London in 1962 and the Chartered Institute of Arbitrators in 1970.

His business career included serving as president of Linkman Ltd. and Lincoln Manson Inc., vice-president of Dominican International Insurance Consultants, and vice-president and a board member of Tomenson Saunders Whitehead Ltd. From 1978 to 1980, he was president of the disciplinary board of the Association des courtiers d'assurance du Québec. He was also a lecturer with the American Management Association and Canadian Management Centre from 1970 to 1980.

Before entering politics, Lincoln was involved with organizations assisting people with intellectual disabilities. He served as president of Promotions sociales Taylor Thibodeau and was a former president of the Lakeshore Association for Retarded Citizens and West Island Adaptation Services.

== Provincial politics ==
Lincoln was first elected to the National Assembly of Quebec as the Liberal member for Nelligan in the 1981 Quebec general election. He was re-elected in the 1985 Quebec general election, when the Liberals under Robert Bourassa returned to government.

Bourassa appointed Lincoln minister of the environment on December 12, 1985. During his tenure, the government introduced measures dealing with pesticides, agricultural pollution, waste management and the protection and development of waterways. Lincoln was also responsible for establishing the snowy owl as Quebec's official bird emblem.

In 1988, Lincoln was involved in the provincial response to the Saint-Basile-le-Grand PCB fire. That year, he also participated in negotiations leading to the federal–provincial agreement establishing the St. Lawrence Action Plan for pollution reduction and environmental restoration of the Saint Lawrence River.

On December 21, 1988, Lincoln resigned from cabinet along with fellow anglophone ministers Richard French and Herbert Marx in protest against the Bourassa government's adoption of Bill 178, which invoked the notwithstanding clause to maintain restrictions on the use of languages other than French on outdoor commercial signs. Lincoln remained an MNA for the remainder of the legislature but did not seek re-election in 1989.

== Federal politics ==
After leaving provincial politics, Lincoln became an environmental consultant. He was appointed president of the Great Lakes Foundation in 1992.

In 1990, he sought the leadership of the Liberal Party of Canada and simultaneously contested a federal by-election in Chambly. He was defeated by Phil Edmonston of the New Democratic Party and withdrew from the Liberal leadership contest on February 27, 1990.

Lincoln returned to elected office in the 1993 Canadian federal election, winning Lachine—Lac-Saint-Louis for the Liberal Party. Following redistribution, he was elected in Lac-Saint-Louis in 1997 and again in 2000.

From December 1993 until February 1996, Lincoln served as parliamentary secretary to Sheila Copps in her capacities as deputy prime minister and minister of the environment.

Lincoln later chaired the Standing Committee on Canadian Heritage. Under his chairmanship, the committee conducted a major review of Canada's broadcasting system, resulting in the 2003 report Our Cultural Sovereignty: The Second Century of Canadian Broadcasting, commonly known as the Lincoln Report.

Lincoln did not seek re-election in the 2004 Canadian federal election. He was succeeded in Lac-Saint-Louis by his former political aide Francis Scarpaleggia.

Following his retirement from Parliament, the federal government appointed Lincoln chair of the Panel on Access to Third-language Public Television Services.

== Environmental and community work ==
Lincoln has had a long association with the Algonquins of Barriere Lake. By 1992, he was serving as the community's special representative in negotiations concerning the Barriere Lake Trilateral Agreement, an agreement involving the First Nation and the federal and Quebec governments concerning management of its traditional territory.

Lincoln continued to represent the community after leaving elected office. In 2017, testimony before the House of Commons Standing Committee on Indigenous and Northern Affairs identified him as the Algonquins' negotiator with the Quebec government over the Barriere Lake agreement. In December 2021, Indigenous Services Canada recorded a ministerial briefing concerning a meeting request from Lincoln about the agreement.

Lincoln served as president of the English-Speaking Catholic Council of Quebec from 2007 to 2010.

In 2012, Lincoln participated in the Quebec National Assembly's Mémoires de députés oral-history series. His political memoir, Toward New Horizons, was published by Shoreline Press in 2013.

Lincoln has remained publicly active in political, environmental and community affairs in his later years. In May 2026, at the age of 97, he appeared on the Montreal Gazette podcast The Corner Booth alongside constitutional lawyer Frédéric Bérard to discuss the threshold required for a province to separate from Canada. In August 2026, the Gazette published an opinion article by Lincoln in which he called for greater protection of Canada's freshwater resources from climate change, pollution and increasing demands for water. On August 22, he attended the dedication of the William-Bill-McMurchie Pier in Pointe-Claire, honouring the city's former mayor Bill McMurchie.

== Electoral record ==
1993 Canadian federal election: Lachine—Lac-Saint-Louis
Party	Candidate	Votes	%	±%
Liberal	Clifford Lincoln	39,732	67.45	
Bloc Québécois	Guy Amyot	12,014	20.40	
Progressive Conservative	Nick di Tomaso	4,717	8.01	
New Democratic	Val Udvarhely	822	1.40	
Independent	Bill Shaw	618	1.05	
Natural Law	Ronald Bessette	559	0.95	
Libertarian	Jim Wiebe	191	0.32	
Commonwealth of Canada	Claude Brosseau	169	0.29	
Abolitionist	Michael Robinson	81	0.14	
Total valid votes		58,903	100.00	
Source: Parliament of Canada. Bill Shaw was a candidate of the unregistered Equality Party of Canada. Source:

By-election on 12 February 1990 Chambly: Resignation of Richard Grisé, 30 May 1989
Party	Candidate	Votes	%	±%
New Democratic	Phil Edmonston	26,998	67.63	+36.11
Liberal	Clifford Lincoln	7,000	17.54	-2.33
Progressive Conservative	Serge Bégin	3,819	9.57	-37.07
Green	Jocelyne Décarie	1,846	4.62	–
Independent	Gilles Maillé	160	0.40	–
Social Credit	Emilien Martel	96	0.24	–
Total valid votes		39,919	100.00	

1985 Quebec general election: Nelligan
Party	Candidate	Votes	%	
Liberal	Clifford Lincoln	24,112	75.42	+1.57
Parti Québécois	François Landry	5,939	18.58	-4.09
New Democrat	Joan Eyolfson Cadham	1,123	3.51	–
Progressive Conservative	Richard K. Kendall	798	2.49	–

1981 Quebec general election: Nelligan
Party	Candidate	Votes	%
Liberal	Clifford Lincoln	23,168	73.85
Parti Québécois	Denise Cypihot	7,113	22.67
Libertarian	Irena Bubniuk	392	1.25
Union Nationale	Clément Guimond	375	1.20
Freedom of Choice	Donovan James Carter	324	1.03
