= Pierre Marsan =

Canadian politician

MNA for Robert-Baldwin
- In office September 12, 1994 – April 23, 2014
- Preceded by: Sam Elkas
- Succeeded by: Carlos Leitão

Personal details
- Born: June 29, 1948 (age 77) Montreal, Quebec
- Party: Quebec Liberal Party
- Portfolio: Immigration, cultural communities

Pierre Marsan (born June 29, 1948 in Montreal, Quebec) is a Quebec politician. He was the member of National Assembly of Quebec for the riding of Robert-Baldwin for the Quebec Liberal Party.

Marsan went to the Université du Québec à Montréal and obtained a bachelor's degree in business administration and would add a master's degree in health administration at Université de Montréal. He was a guest teacher in the faculty of administration at the Université de Montréal and was a director in hospital services at the Hotel-Dieu's Saint-Jérôme Hospital. He was the general manager at the Montreal Heart Institute and the Hôpital du Sacré-Coeur. He was an assistant director at Santa Cabrini Hospital. He was also a board member for several institutions including the Montreal Heart Institute, the Epic Foundation, the Hôpital du Sacré Coeur Foundation and the president of the Association of Canadian Teaching Hospitals.

Marsan was first elected in Robert-Baldwin in 1994 and was in charge of the electoral campaign program Pour un Quebec en Santé in 1998. He was re-elected for a third term in 2003 and was the parliamentary secretary to the Minister of Health and Social Services and then the Secretary to Jean Charest. He was re-elected for a fourth term in 2007 and named the Parliamentary Secretary to the Minister of Immigration and Cultural Communities.

== Political career ==
=== Fundraising controversy ===
On September 16, 2013, a journalist revealed a letter circulating in the Association sépharade de la banlieue ouest de Montréal signed by Pierre Marsan and his chief electoral officer, Aimé Bensoussan. The letter solicited contributions from members of the association, reminding them that the local Jewish community benefited from generous contributions, including a daycare permit, while the Liberals were in power.

The Parti québécois and the Coalition Avenir Québec strongly reacted to the event, claiming that this added to a long list of recent instances of corruption within the Quebec Liberal Party, which has favoured Liberal contributors in daycare permit attributions and other types of financial compensations.

Pierre Marsan formally apologised for his "clumsy" gesture. Party leader Philippe Couillard qualified the incident as "unacceptable", declaring that such practices will never again take place in the party.

On September 17, 2013, the Chief Electoral Officer of Quebec, Jacques Drouin, declared that there would be an inquiry in the constituency of Robert-Baldwin following these events, upon which Pierre Marsan and Aimé Bensoussan would be called.

== Electoral record (partial) ==
1994 Quebec general election: Robert-Baldwin
Party	Candidate	Votes	%	±%
Liberal	Pierre Marsan	29,865	82.98	+36.93
Parti Québécois	Nicolas Tétrault	3,541	9.84	−3.09
Equality	Bart Sellitto	969	2.69	−38.33
Action démocratique	Mario Pilote Jr.	909	2.53	–
CANADA!	Harry Polansky	364	1.01	–
Natural Law	Ruby Finkelstein	123	0.34	–
Republic of Canada	Robert Charles	120	0.33	–
Innovator	Martin Leduc	99	0.28	–
Total valid votes		35,990	99.20	–
Rejected and declined votes		291	0.80	–
Turnout		36,281	85.17	+10.50
Electors on the lists		42,600	–	–
Source: Official Results, Le Directeur général des élections du Québec.
