= Pointe-Claire (electoral district) =

Quebec electoral district

Defunct provincial electoral district
- Legislature: National Assembly of Quebec
- District created: 1972
- District abolished: 1980
- First contested: 1973
- Last contested: 1976

Pointe-Claire was a former provincial electoral district in the Montreal region of Quebec, Canada that elected members to the National Assembly of Quebec.

It was created for the 1973 election, from parts of the existing Jacques-Cartier and Robert-Baldwin electoral districts. Its final election was in 1976. It disappeared in the 1981 election and its successor electoral district was Nelligan.

== Members of the National Assembly ==
| Legislature | Years | Member | Party |
|---|---|---|---|
Riding created from Jacques-Cartier and Robert-Baldwin
| 30th | 1973–1970 | Arthur-Ewen Seguin | Liberal |
| 31st | 1976–1978 | William Shaw | Union Nationale |
| 31st | 1978–1981 | William Shaw | Independent |
Riding dissolved into Nelligan
