= Nelligan (electoral district) =

Provincial electoral district in Quebec, Canada

Quebec electoral district
- Location in Montreal

Provincial electoral district
- Legislature: National Assembly of Quebec
MNA
Monsef Derraji
Liberal
- District created: 1980
- First contested: 1981
- Last contested: 2026

Demographics
- Population (2011): 80,510
- Electors (2014): 58,147
- Area (km²): 70.3
- Pop. density (per km²): 1,145.2
- Census division: Montreal (part)
- Census subdivision(s): Montreal (part), Kirkland

Nelligan is a provincial electoral district in the Montreal region of Quebec, Canada, that elects members to the National Assembly of Quebec. It comprises most of the Pierrefonds-Roxboro borough and all of the L'Île-Bizard–Sainte-Geneviève borough of Montreal, and the city of Kirkland.

It was created for the 1981 election from parts of Pointe-Claire and Robert-Baldwin electoral districts.

In the change from the 2001 to the 2011 electoral map, it lost Senneville to the Jacques-Cartier electoral district but gained from it the part of Kirkland that it did not already have. It also lost a small part of Pierrefonds-Roxboro to the Robert-Baldwin electoral district.

It was named after the noted Quebec poet Émile Nelligan.

== Linguistic demographics ==
- Anglophone: 34.5%
- Francophone: 33.5%
- Allophone: 32.1%

== Members of the National Assembly ==
Legislature	Years	Member	Party
Riding created from Pointe-Claire and Robert-Baldwin
32nd	1981–1985	Clifford Lincoln	Liberal
33rd	1985–1989	Clifford Lincoln	Liberal
34th	1989–1994	Russell Williams	Liberal
35th	1994–1998	Russell Williams	Liberal
36th	1998–2003	Russell Williams	Liberal
37th	2003–2004	Russell Williams	Liberal
37th	2004–2007	Yolande James	Liberal
38th	2007–2008	Yolande James	Liberal
39th	2008–2012	Yolande James	Liberal
40th	2012–2014	Yolande James	Liberal
41st	2014–2018	Martin Coiteux	Liberal
42nd	2018–2022	Monsef Derraji	Liberal
43rd	2022–2026	Monsef Derraji	Liberal
44th	2026–Present	Monsef Derraji	Liberal

== Election results ==
2026 Quebec general election
** Preliminary results — Not yet official **
Party	Candidate	Votes	%	±%
Liberal	Monsef Derraji	21,690	63.70	
Conservative	Gary Charles	4,872	14.31	
Parti Québécois	Martine Dubois	2,563	7.53	
Québec solidaire	Dominique Naud	2,301	6.76	
Coalition Avenir Québec	Tom Tang	1,663	4.88	
Canadian	Michael Wilkinson	493	1.45	
Green	Alex Di Pardo	470	1.38	
Total valid votes				
Total rejected ballots				
Turnout			58.97	
Electors on the lists			–	–
Source: Élections Québec

2022 Quebec general election
Party	Candidate	Votes	%	±%
Liberal	Monsef Derraji	17,454	52.03	-13.09
Coalition Avenir Québec	Cynthia Lapierre	5,584	16.65	-0.52
Conservative	Gary Charles	5,061	15.09	+12.08
Québec solidaire	Maxime Larue-Bourdages	1,766	5.26	-0.26
Parti Québécois	Jocelyn Caron	1,399	4.17	-0.42
Canadian	Jean Marier	1,014	3.02	–
Bloc Montreal	Neena Hanif	610	1.82	–
Green	Daniel Reiniger	558	1.66	-1.36
Démocratie directe	Michael Hennawy	100	0.30	–
Total valid votes		33,546	99.23	
Total rejected ballots		261	0.77	
Turnout		33,807	58.76	-0.82
Electors on the lists		57,537		

2018 Quebec general election
Party	Candidate	Votes	%	±%
Liberal	Monsef Derraji	22,421	65.12	-15.22
Coalition Avenir Québec	Angela Rapoport	5,911	17.17	+7.7
Québec solidaire	Simon Tremblay-Pepin	1,902	5.52	
Parti Québécois	Chantal Legendre	1,580	4.59	-2.35
Green	Giuseppe Cammarrota	1,040	3.02	+0.69
Conservative	Mathew Levitsky-Kaminski	1,038	3.01	+2.64
New Democratic	Leslie Eric Murphy	537	1.56	
Total valid votes		34,429	99.21	
Total rejected ballots		274	0.79	
Turnout		34,703	59.58	
Eligible voters		58,249		
Liberal hold		Swing		-11.46
Source(s) "Rapport des résultats officiels du scrutin". Élections Québec.

2014 Quebec general election
Party	Candidate	Votes	%	±%
Liberal	Martin Coiteux	36,494	80.34	+14.03
Coalition Avenir Québec	Albert Bitton	4,303	9.47	-9.01
Parti Québécois	Louis-David Bénard	3,153	6.94	-2.03
Green	Charles Bourassa	1,060	2.33	-0.66
Option nationale	François Landry	245	0.54	-0.16
Conservative	Trevor Pinto	167	0.37	–
Total valid votes		45,424	99.38	–
Total rejected ballots		284	0.62	–
Turnout		45,708	78.61	+5.40
Electors on the lists		58,147	–	–

2012 Quebec general election
Party	Candidate	Votes	%	±%
Liberal	Yolande James	27,470	66.31	-5.88
Coalition Avenir Québec	Philippe Boileau	7,654	18.48	+12.81*
Parti Québécois	Marcos Archambault	3,716	8.97	-5.49
Green	Kristianne Brunet	1,238	2.99	-3.19
Québec solidaire	Elahé Machouf	966	2.33	+0.83
Option nationale	François Landry	292	0.70	–
Quebec Citizens' Union	Jean-Dominic Lévesque-René	89	0.21	–
Total valid votes		41,425	99.43	
Total rejected ballots		237	0.57	
Turnout		41,662	73.21	+26.17
Electors on the lists		56,909	–	–

* Result compared to Action démocratique

2008 Quebec general election
Party	Candidate	Votes	%	±%
Liberal	Yolande James	18,251	72.19	+8.37
Parti Québécois	Anaïs Valiquette-L'Heureux	3,656	14.46	+5.61
Green	Jonathan Théorêt	1,562	6.18	-1.43
Action démocratique	François Savard	1,434	5.67	-12.46
Québec solidaire	Elahé Machouf	379	1.50	-0.08
Total valid votes		25,282	99.04	–
Total rejected ballots		244	0.96	–
Turnout		25,526	47.04	-17.12
Electors on the lists		54,259	–	–

2007 Quebec general election
Party	Candidate	Votes	%	±%
Liberal	Yolande James	21,458	63.82	+11.24
Action démocratique	Jean Lecavalier	6,096	18.13	+11.14
Parti Québécois	Dorothée Morin	2,977	8.85	-1.50
Green	Jonathan Théorêt	2,560	7.61	+5.92
Québec solidaire	Elahé Machouf	532	1.58	+0.77*
Total valid votes		33,623	99.33	–
Total rejected ballots		226	0.67	–
Turnout		33,849	64.16	+35.56
Electors on the lists		52,758	–	–

* Increase is from UFP

Quebec provincial by-election, September 20, 2004
Party	Candidate	Votes	%	±%
Liberal	Yolande James	7,812	52.58	-25.02
Independent	Michel Gibson	4,038	27.18	–
Parti Québécois	Sahar Hawili	1,538	10.35	-2.46
Action démocratique	Tom Pentefountas	1,039	6.99	-0.45
Green	Ryan Young	251	1.69	+0.19
UFP	Josée Larouche	120	0.81	–
Bloc Pot	Blair Longley	58	0.39	–
Total valid votes		14,856	99.58	–
Total rejected ballots		62	0.42	–
Turnout		14,918	28.60	-41.05
Electors on the lists		52,163	–	–

2003 Quebec general election
Party	Candidate	Votes	%	±%
Liberal	Russell Williams	27,934	77.60	+1.93
Parti Québécois	Micaël Poirier	4,611	12.81	-3.07
Action démocratique	Sabrina Duguay	2,680	7.44	+1.40
Green	Peter Graham	541	1.50	–
Equality	Giuliana Pendenza	233	0.65	-1.13
Total valid votes		35,999	99.33	–
Total rejected ballots		241	0.67	–
Turnout		36,240	69.65	-10.26
Electors on the lists		52,033	–	–

1998 Quebec general election
Party	Candidate	Votes	%	±%
Liberal	Russell Williams	35,698	75.67	-1.49
Parti Québécois	André Tremblay	7,492	15.88	-2.40
Action démocratique	Martin Brunet	2,848	6.04	–
Equality	John Novak	840	1.78	-0.21
Socialist Democracy	Érik Cossette	156	0.33	–
Independent	Serge Tétreault	140	0.30	–
Total valid votes		47,174	99.38	–
Total rejected ballots		295	0.62	–
Turnout		47,469	79.91	-6.33
Electors on the lists		59,403	–	–

1995 Quebec referendum
Side	Votes	%
Non	42,494	81.82
Oui	9,443	18.18

1994 Quebec general election
Party	Candidate	Votes	%	±%
Liberal	Russell Williams	33,804	77.16	+30.13
Parti Québécois	Denise Cypihot	8,010	18.28	-2.12
Equality	Bill Shaw	871	1.99	-27.61
CANADA!	Paul Daoussis	447	1.02	–
Economic	Claudette Benoit	292	0.67	–
Natural Law	Michael Oliver	276	0.63	–
Republic of Canada	Glenford Charles	111	0.25	–

1992 Charlottetown Accord referendum
Side	Votes	%
Oui	33,394	73.81
Non	11,849	26.19

1989 Quebec general election
Party	Candidate	Votes	%	±%
Liberal	Russell Williams	16,284	47.03	-28.39
Equality	Jean-Pierre Isoré	10,249	29.60	–
Parti Québécois	Marc Boudreau	7,063	20.40	+1.82
New Democrat	Jean-Paul Rioux	664	1.92	-1.59
Independent	Alexandre Kisak	367	1.06	–

1985 Quebec general election
Party	Candidate	Votes	%	±%
Liberal	Clifford Lincoln	24,112	75.42	+1.57
Parti Québécois	François Landry	5,939	18.58	-4.09
New Democrat	Joan Eyolfson Cadham	1,123	3.51	–
Progressive Conservative	Richard K. Kendall	798	2.49	–

1981 Quebec general election
Party	Candidate	Votes	%
Liberal	Clifford Lincoln	23,168	73.85
Parti Québécois	Denise Cypihot	7,113	22.67
Libertarian	Irena Bubniuk	392	1.25
Union Nationale	Clément Guimond	375	1.20
Freedom of Choice	Donovan James Carter	324	1.03

== See also ==
- List of Quebec provincial electoral districts
- Canadian provincial electoral districts
