= Pierre MacDonald =

Canadian politician

Member of the National Assembly of Quebec
- In office 1985–1989
- Preceded by: John O'Gallagher
- Succeeded by: Sam Elkas
- Constituency: Robert-Baldwin

Personal details
- Born: 19 June 1936 Quebec City, Quebec
- Died: 7 July 2015 (aged 79)
- Party: Quebec Liberal Party

Pierre MacDonald (19 June 1936 – 7 July 2015) was a Quebec politician and the Liberal Party of Quebec Industry Minister under Premier Robert Bourassa's second government. He was the member for the majority non-francophone riding of Robert-Baldwin.

Twelve years after Bill 101 made French Quebec's official language in 1977, MacDonald claimed that Eaton's department store had been staffed by "grosses maudites anglaises" ("damn fat English women") who did not speak French.
