= Lac-Saint-Louis =

Federal electoral district in Quebec, Canada

Coordinates: 45°26′N 73°53′W

Quebec electoral district
- Interactive map of riding boundaries from the 2015 federal election

Federal electoral district
- Legislature: House of Commons
MP
Francis Scarpaleggia
Liberal
- District created: 1996
- First contested: 1997
- Last contested: 2025
- District webpage: profile, map

Demographics
- Population (2016): 108,579
- Electors (2019): 83,788
- Area (km²): 81
- Pop. density (per km²): 1,340.5
- Census division: Montreal
- Census subdivision(s): Montreal (part), Pointe-Claire, Kirkland, Beaconsfield, Sainte-Anne-de-Bellevue, Baie-d'Urfé, Senneville

Lac-Saint-Louis (French pronunciation: [laksɛ̃lwi]) is a federal electoral district in Quebec, Canada, which has been represented in the House of Commons since 1997.

It is on the southwestern tip of the Island of Montreal, encompassing a small part of the city of Montreal. Its population was 108,579 at the 2016 Canadian census.

Since 2004, its Member of Parliament (MP) has been Francis Scarpaleggia of the Liberal Party.

== Demographics ==
According to the 2021 Canadian census, 2023 representation order

Racial groups: 68.9% White, 7.5% Chinese, 5.0% South Asian, 4.8% Arab, 4.2% Black, 2.0% Latin American, 2.0% West Asian, 1.9% Filipino
Languages: 48.2% English, 25.6% French, 4.9% Mandarin, 3.4% Arabic, 3.3% Italian, 2.3% Spanish, 1.8% Persian, 1.0% Romanian
Religions: 60.1% Christian (37.3% Catholic, 6.6% Christian Orthodox, 3.0% Anglican, 1.8% United Church, 11.5% Other), 5.5% Muslim, 2.3% Hindu, 2.0% Jewish, 28.2% None
Median income: $44,000 (2020)
Average income: $66,200 (2020)

== Geography ==
The district includes the cities of Beaconsfield and Pointe-Claire; the towns of Baie-d'Urfé, Kirkland and Sainte-Anne-de-Bellevue; the municipality of Senneville; and the western part of the borough of Pierrefonds-Roxboro of the city of Montreal.

The neighbouring ridings are Pierrefonds—Dollard, Dorval—Lachine—LaSalle, Châteauguay—Les Jardins-de-Napierville, Vaudreuil and Mirabel.

== History ==
The electoral district was created in 1996 from Lachine—Lac-Saint-Louis and Vaudreuil ridings.

This riding was largely untouched by the 2012 electoral redistribution, gaining a small territory from Notre-Dame-de-Grâce—Lachine.

=== Members of Parliament ===
This riding has elected the following members of Parliament:

Parliament	Years	Member	Party
Lac-Saint-Louis; Riding created from Lachine—Lac-Saint-Louis and Vaudreuil
36th	1997–2000	Clifford Lincoln	Liberal
37th	2000–2004	Clifford Lincoln	Liberal
38th	2004–2006	Francis Scarpaleggia	Liberal
39th	2006–2008	Francis Scarpaleggia	Liberal
40th	2008–2011	Francis Scarpaleggia	Liberal
41st	2011–2015	Francis Scarpaleggia	Liberal
42nd	2015–2019	Francis Scarpaleggia	Liberal
43rd	2019–2021	Francis Scarpaleggia	Liberal
44th	2021–2025	Francis Scarpaleggia	Liberal
45th	2025–present	Francis Scarpaleggia	Liberal

== Election results ==
2025 Canadian federal election
Party	Candidate	Votes	%	±%	Expenditures
Liberal	Francis Scarpaleggia	43,446	67.63	+11.37	$96,372.78
Conservative	Matthew Rusniak	15,203	23.67	+4.76	$42,736.59
Bloc Québécois	Tommy Fournier	2,330	3.63	–1.71	$3,221.59
New Democratic	Gregory Evdokias	1,877	2.92	–10.38	$485.11
Green	Raymond Frizzell	915	1.42	–1.81	$0.00
People's	Mathieu Dufort	471	0.73	–2.23	$1,318.50
Total valid votes		64,242	99.32	–	$131,928.23
Total rejected ballots		437	0.68	-0.22	
Turnout		64,679	75.06	+5.48	
Eligible voters		86,164			
Liberal hold		Swing		+3.30	
Source: Elections Canada

2021 Canadian federal election
Party	Candidate	Votes	%	±%	Expenditures
Liberal	Francis Scarpaleggia	32,477	56.3	-1.9	$82,540.53
Conservative	Ann Francis	10,911	18.9	+3.6	$6,039.07
New Democratic	Jonathan Gray	7,679	13.3	+1.1	$2,178.95
Bloc Québécois	Rémi Lebeuf	3,078	5.3	±0.0	$2,242.01
Green	Milan Kona-Mancini	1,868	3.2	-3.8	$0.00
People's	Afia Lassy	1,712	3.0	+1.6	$4,594.81
Total valid votes/expense limit		57,725	99.1	–	$113,303.53
Total rejected ballots		524	0.9		
Turnout		58,249	69.7		
Registered voters		83,616			
Liberal hold		Swing		-2.8	
Source: Elections Canada

2019 Canadian federal election: Lac-Saint-Louis
Party	Candidate	Votes	%	±%	Expenditures
Liberal	Francis Scarpaleggia	34,622	58.16	-5.97	$79,198.20
Conservative	Ann Francis	9,083	15.26	-2.16	$47,678.03
New Democratic	Dana Chevalier	7,263	12.20	-0.63	$1,823.39
Green	Milan Kona-Mancini	4,176	7.02	+4.11	$11,504.53
Bloc Québécois	Julie Benoît	3,169	5.32	+2.63	$1,149.75
People's	Gary Charles	805	1.35	–	$10,581.28
Animal Protection	Victoria de Martigny	379	0.64	–	none listed
Canadian Nationalist	Ralston Coelho	28	0.05	–	$0.00
Total valid votes/expense limit		59,525	99.26		TBD
Total rejected ballots		445	0.74	+0.23	
Turnout		59,970	71.33	-1.61	
Eligible voters		84,074			
Liberal hold		Swing		-1.90	
Source: Elections Canada

2015 Canadian federal election
Party	Candidate	Votes	%	±%	Expenditures
Liberal	Francis Scarpaleggia	39,965	64.14	+30.03	$119,096.00
Conservative	Eric Girard	10,857	17.42	-11.02	$74,550.48
New Democratic	Ryan Young	7,997	12.83	-17.23	$30,673.16
Green	Bradford Dean	1,812	2.91	-1.36	–
Bloc Québécois	Gabriel Bernier	1,681	2.70	-0.42	$4,317.92
Total valid votes/expense limit		62,312	99.49		$224,522.81
Total rejected ballots		321	0.51	-0.02	
Turnout		62,633	72.94	+6.81	
Eligible voters		85,870			
Liberal hold		Swing		+23.63	
Source: Elections Canada

2011 federal election redistributed results
Party	Vote	%
Liberal	18,502	34.10
New Democratic	16,312	30.06
Conservative	15,434	28.44
Green	2,319	4.27
Bloc Québécois	1,693	3.12

2011 Canadian federal election
Party	Candidate	Votes	%	±%	Expenditures
Liberal	Francis Scarpaleggia	18,457	34.11	-12.27	
New Democratic	Alain Ackad	16,253	30.04	+14.28	
Conservative	Larry Smith	15,394	28.45	+4.94	
Green	Bruno Tremblay	2,315	4.28	-4.30	
Bloc Québécois	Éric Taillefer	1,689	3.12	-2.62	
Total valid votes/expense limit		54,108	100.00	–	
Rejected ballots		287	0.53	-0.01	
Turnout		54,395	66.13	+2.10	
Liberal hold		Swing		-13.28	

2008 Canadian federal election
Party	Candidate	Votes	%	±%	Expenditures
Liberal	Francis Scarpaleggia	23,842	46.38	-1.8	$71,566
Conservative	Andrea Paine	12,085	23.51	-3.2	$54,850
New Democratic	Daniel Quinn	8,105	15.76	+5.1	
Green	Peter Graham	4,415	8.58	+1.8	$7,679
Bloc Québécois	Maxime Clément	2,953	5.74	-2.0	$6,931
Total valid votes/expense limit		51,400	100.00	–	
Rejected ballots		277	0.54		
Turnout		51,677	64.03		
Liberal hold		Swing		-2.5	

2006 Canadian federal election
Party	Candidate	Votes	%	±%	Expenditures
Liberal	Francis Scarpaleggia	25,588	48.2	-15.7	$46,751
Conservative	Andrea Paine	14,164	26.7	+14.6	$74,919
New Democratic	Daniel Quinn	5,702	10.7	+5.6	$8,129
Bloc Québécois	Anne-Marie Guertin	4,064	7.7	-2.5	$9,298
Green	Peter Graham	3,605	6.8	+1.6	$1,340
Total valid votes/expense limit		53,123	100.0	$80,616	
Liberal hold		Swing		-215.15	

2004 Canadian federal election
Party	Candidate	Votes	%	±%	Expenditures
Liberal	Francis Scarpaleggia	32,122	63.9	-10.3	$41,498
Conservative	Jeff Howard	6,082	12.1	-2.6	$15,262
Bloc Québécois	Maxime Côté	5,106	10.2	+3.5	$7,084
New Democratic	Daniel Quinn	3,789	7.5	+5.0	$6,036
Green	Peter Graham	2,584	5.1	–	$1,808
Marijuana	Patrick Cardinal	578	1.1	-0.6	
Total valid votes/expense limit		50,261	100.0	$79,772	
Liberal hold		Swing		-6.45	

Note: Conservative vote is compared to the total of the Canadian Alliance vote and Progressive Conservative vote in the 2000 election.

2000 Canadian federal election
Party	Candidate	Votes	%	±%
Liberal	Clifford Lincoln	43,515	74.2	+5.2
Progressive Conservative	Daniel Gendron	4,411	7.5	-10.8
Alliance	William F. Shaw	4,218	7.2	+4.7
Bloc Québécois	Guy Amyot	3,913	6.7	-0.4
New Democratic	Erin Sikora	1,464	2.5	0.0
Marijuana	Elena D'Apollonia	1,031	1.8	
Marxist–Leninist	Garnet Colly	119	0.2	
Total valid votes		58,671	100.0	

Note: Canadian Alliance vote is compared to the Reform vote in 1997 election.

1997 Canadian federal election
Party	Candidate	Votes	%
Liberal	Clifford Lincoln	42,613	69.0
Progressive Conservative	Nick Di Tomaso	11,293	18.3
Bloc Québécois	Guy Amyot	4,347	7.0
Reform	William Bill Haines	1,556	2.5
New Democratic	Chris Florence	1,548	2.5
Natural Law	Ruby Finkelstein	386	0.6
Total valid votes		61,743	100.0

== See also ==
- List of Canadian electoral districts
- Historical federal electoral districts of Canada

Parliament of Canada
Preceded by Hull—Aylmer	Constituency represented by the speaker of the House of Commons; 2025–present	Incumbent
