= William Shaw (Quebec politician) =

Canadian politician

Member of the National Assembly of Quebec for Pointe-Claire
- In office 1976–1981
- Preceded by: Arthur-Ewen Seguin
- Succeeded by: District abolished in 1980

Personal details
- Born: Frederick William Shaw; October 13, 1932 Montreal, Quebec, Canada
- Died: May 26, 2018 (aged 85) Port Perry, Ontario, Canada
- Party: Union Nationale; Les Démocrates; Independent; Equality Party; Canadian Alliance
- Education: McGill University
- Occupation: Politician, Dentist

Frederick William "Bill" Shaw (October 13, 1932 – May 26, 2018) was a Canadian politician from Quebec.

== Background ==
He was born on October 13, 1932, in Montreal and was a dentist. He served in the Canadian Army in the 1950s. He graduated as an oral surgeon from McGill University in 1958.

Before he ran for office, he was a Progressive Conservative activist. He co-authored Partition, The Price of Quebec's Independence in 1980. He moved to Ontario in 2010 after retiring and died in Port Perry on May 26, 2018.

== Provincial politics ==
Shaw unsuccessfully ran as a Union Nationale candidate to the National Assembly of Quebec in the 1970 election in the district of Robert-Baldwin, finishing a distant third.

He was a leadership candidate for the party convention, held on May 22 and 23, 1976. He lost to Rodrigue Biron.

Shaw ran again for a seat in the legislature and won in the 1976 election in the district of Pointe-Claire, with 45% of the vote. By February 18, 1978, he sat as an Independent. He also briefly supported Les Démocrates in 1978.

He was defeated in the district of Jacques-Cartier as an Independent in the 1981 election and as an Equality Party candidate in the 1998 election.

Shaw was the leader of the Freedom of Choice Party until it ceased to exist in 1985.

== Federal politics ==
Shaw ran as an independent candidate in the federal district of Lachine—Lac-Saint-Louis in the 1993 federal election and as a Canadian Alliance candidate in the riding of Lac-Saint-Louis in the 2000 election. Both times, he lost to the Liberal candidate Clifford Lincoln, finishing in fifth place in 1993 and in third place in 2000.
