= Yolande James =

Canadian politician

Member of the National Assembly of Quebec for Nelligan
- In office September 20, 2004 – April 7, 2014
- Preceded by: Russell Williams
- Succeeded by: Martin Coiteux

Personal details
- Born: November 21, 1977 (age 48) Montreal, Quebec
- Party: Quebec Liberal Party
- Cabinet: Minister of Immigration and Cultural Communities & Minister Of Family

Yolande James (born November 21, 1977, in Montreal, Quebec) is a former Quebec provincial politician. She was the first black female MNA, the youngest, and the first black cabinet minister in Quebec history. A member of the Quebec Liberal Party, she represented the multicultural riding of Nelligan in the Island of Montreal from 2004 to 2014.

== Biography ==
James's father and mother are Canadian citizens who emigrated from St. Lucia and St. Vincent, respectively. She grew up in Montreal's West Island area and went to a francophone primary school. James says she first got involved in politics and with the Quebec Liberal Party during the 1995 Quebec sovereignty referendum campaign.

James received a Bachelor's degree in civil law in 2000 from Université de Montréal and a Bachelor's degree in common law from Queen's University in 2003. She was called to the Bar of Quebec in 2004.

She was a political adviser at the Ministry of Health and Social Services and was the political aid of a former MNA for the Nelligan riding. She also collaborated in a local program which helped youths with learning difficulties.

== Political career ==
She was first elected to the National Assembly of Quebec for the riding of Nelligan in a by-election held on September 20, 2004. She was re-elected in the 2007, 2008, and 2012 general elections.

She was appointed Minister of Immigration and Cultural Communities in the minority government cabinet of Quebec Premier Jean Charest in 2007 following the initiative of Jean Charest to represent Anglophones and Cultural Communities in his Cabinet. After Tony Tomassi's sudden resignation in 2010, she was given an additional role in cabinet as Family Minister. In August 2010, she retained the Family portfolio in a cabinet shuffle but lost her culture and immigration duties to Kathleen Weil.

When Parti Québécois leader Pauline Marois demanded that the province of Quebec have full control over its immigration, James replied that under a bilateral agreement with the national government, Quebec already has all the power it needs to select the economic immigrants it wants.

James publicly entered the controversy over reasonable accommodation by stating that she stood by her decree to bar students from covering their faces with niqabs or burqas in French-language classes. She claimed that "There is no ambiguity about this question. If you want to assist in [attend] our classes and integrate into Quebec society, here are our values. We want to see your face." James's department decreed that Naema Ahmed leave CEGEP St. Laurent when Ahmed declined to remove her niqab during lessons.

However, after James left provincial politics, she stated that her thinking on the niqab had evolved. The district of Saint Laurent, QC, where she sought a federal candidacy in a by-election, was 17 percent Muslim in the 2011 Census of Canada. On February 24, 2014, James announced she was leaving politics and would not seek re-election in the 2014 election.

On February 12, 2017, James confirmed on Twitter that she would seek the Liberal Party of Canada's nomination for the Saint-Laurent federal electoral district. However, a 26-year-old high school teacher defeated James for the Liberal nomination in that riding. Emmanuella Lambropoulos beat James and tax law professor Marwah Rizqy to secure the nomination.

== Political commentator ==
James currently provides commentary to several CBC political programs, including as one of four former National Assembly ministers on the noonhour CBC Radio Canada and as a member of the "Power Panel" on Power & Politics, an English-language political program on CBC News Network.

== Electoral record ==
Quebec provincial by-election, September 20, 2004: Nelligan
Party	Candidate	Votes	%	±%
Liberal	Yolande James	7,812	52.58	
Independent	Michel Gibson	4,038	27.18	
Parti Québécois	Sahar Hawili	1,538	10.35	
Action démocratique	Tom Pentefountas	1,039	6.99	
Green	Ryan Young	251	1.69	–
UFP	Josée Larouche	120	0.81	–
Bloc Pot	Blair Longley	58	0.39	
Total valid votes		14,856	100.00	
Rejected and declined votes		62		
Turnout		14,918	28.60	
Electors on the lists		52,163		
Sources: Official Results, Government of Quebec

Political offices
Preceded by Lise Theriault	Minister of Immigration and Cultural Communities; 2007–2010	Succeeded by Kathleen Weil
Preceded by Tony Tomassi	Minister of Family; 2010–present	Succeeded by Incumbent
