= Martin Coiteux =

Canadian politician (born 1962)

Member of the National Assembly of Quebec for Nelligan
- In office April 23, 2014 – August 29, 2018
- Preceded by: Yolande James
- Succeeded by: Monsef Derraji

Minister of Municipal Affairs
- In office January 28, 2016 – October 18, 2018
- Premier: Philippe Couillard
- Preceded by: Pierre Moreau
- Succeeded by: Andrée Laforest

Minister of Public Safety
- In office January 28, 2016 – October 18, 2018
- Premier: Philippe Couillard
- Preceded by: Lise Thériault
- Succeeded by: Geneviève Guilbault

Minister Responsible for Montreal
- In office January 28, 2016 – October 18, 2018
- Premier: Philippe Couillard
- Preceded by: Robert Poëti
- Succeeded by: Chantal Rouleau

President of the Treasury Board
- In office April 23, 2014 – January 28, 2016
- Premier: Philippe Couillard
- Preceded by: Stéphane Bédard
- Succeeded by: Sam Hamad

Personal details
- Born: February 5, 1962 (age 64) Sorel, Quebec, Canada
- Party: Liberal
- Profession: Economist

Martin Coiteux (French pronunciation: [maʁtɛ̃ kwatø]) (born February 5, 1962) is a Canadian politician in Quebec who was elected to the National Assembly of Quebec in the 2014 election. He represented the electoral district of Nelligan as a member of the Quebec Liberal Party.

== Education and early career ==
Coiteux holds a BSc in economics from the University of Sherbrooke, a master's in economics from Queens University, and a PhD in international economics from the Graduate Institute of International and Development Studies, in Geneva.

Before entering politics, Coiteux taught economics and international business at HEC Montreal for 20 years.

Coiteux has also worked as a senior economist with the Bank of Canada.

== Political career ==
Coiteux was elected to the riding of Nelligan in the 2014 election. While in office, he was made minister and a member of the Cabinet of Premier of Quebec Philippe Couillard. He did not run for re-election in 2018 election.

From 2014 to 2016 he served as President of the Treasury Board and since 2016 as Minister of Public Safety, Municipalities and responsible for Montreal.

== Post-political career ==
On January 17, 2019, Coiteux was named as the Caisse de dépôt et placement du Québec's chief economist.

In 2023, Coiteux returned to HEC Montreal as associate professor of international business.
