= Brigitte Garceau =

Canadian politician

Brigitte Garceau MNA

Member of the National Assembly of Quebec for Robert-Baldwin
- Incumbent
- Assumed office October 3, 2022
- Preceded by: Carlos Leitão

Personal details
- Born: 1964 Montreal
- Party: Quebec Liberal Party

Brigitte B. Garceau is a Canadian politician, who was elected to the National Assembly of Quebec in the 2022 Quebec general election. She represents the riding of Robert-Baldwin as a member of the Quebec Liberal Party.

As of September 7, 2024, she serves as the opposition critic for Status of Women, Youth Protection, Follow-up on the Rebâtir la Confiance Report, Culture and Communications, and Centre-du-Québec.

== Electoral record ==
2026 Quebec general election: Robert-Baldwin
** Preliminary results — Not yet official **
Party	Candidate	Votes	%	±%
Liberal	Brigitte Garceau	19,984	65.05	
Conservative	Axel Lellouche	4,653	15.15	
Québec solidaire	Alexandra Lacoste	2,705	8.80	
Parti Québécois	Maurice Daude	1,505	4.90	
Coalition Avenir Québec	Sophie Leroux	1,035	3.37	
Canadian	Paul Henry Danylewich	532	1.73	
Green	Hélène Savard	309	1.01	
Total valid votes				
Total rejected ballots				
Turnout			56.27	
Electors on the lists			–	–
Liberal hold		Swing		
Source: Élections Québec

2022 Quebec general election: Robert-Baldwin
Party	Candidate	Votes	%	±%
Liberal	Brigitte Garceau	17,228	57.76	-16.09
Conservative	Axel Lellouche	4,779	16.02	+12.99
Coalition Avenir Québec	Maïté Beaudoin	2,909	9.75	-1.57
Québec solidaire	Marieve Ruel	1,498	5.02	+0.68
Canadian	Jonathan Gray	1,231	4.13	–
Bloc Montreal	Qaiser Choudhry	792	2.66	–
Parti Québécois	Alix Martel	776	2.60	-0.67
Green	David MacFarquhar	614	2.06	-0.51
Total valid votes		29,827	99.15	–
Total rejected ballots		257	0.85	–
Turnout		30,084	55.80	+0.20
Electors on the lists		53,910	–	–
