= Kuper Academy =

Private school in Kirkland, Quebec, Canada

Coordinates: 45°27′08″N 73°50′21″W

Kuper Academy is a private school in Kirkland, Quebec, in the Montreal metropolitan area. As of 2024 is owned by Joan Salette, who also serves as the principal administrator. It has preschool through high school.

== History ==
It was established in 1988.

During the COVID-19 pandemic in Quebec the school attempted to hold its graduation ceremony for 2021 in a concert hall or in an outdoor space, but the government of Quebec did not allow either option.

Previously it educated until grade 11. After Bill 96 came into effect in 2022, the students who graduate from grade 11, who would then go to CEGEP, would need to take additional courses in French. The school then added grade 12 effective fall 2023, which would allow students to bypass CEGEP and directly enroll in colleges and universities. According to Salette, the speed to introduce grade 12, which was already being planned, was due to Bill 96.

== Operations ==
The school has an anti-bullying program "Supporting Our Students" (SOS).
