= Sam Elkas =

Canadian politician

MNA for Robert-Baldwin
- In office 1989–1994
- Preceded by: Pierre MacDonald
- Succeeded by: Pierre Marsan

Personal details
- Born: March 31, 1938 (age 88) Sherbrooke, Quebec, Canada
- Party: Quebec Liberal Party

Sam Elkas (born March 31, 1938) is a former Canadian politician, who represented the electoral district of Robert-Baldwin in the National Assembly of Quebec from 1989 to 1994.

Prior to his election to the legislature, Elkas worked as a manager and executive for Bell Canada, and served from 1975 to 1989 as mayor of Kirkland. During his provincial election campaign, he faced a minor controversy when his campaign team released a poorly-translated English campaign brochure, but he won the seat in the 1989 Quebec general election over challenger Adrian Waller of the Equality Party.

Premier Robert Bourassa named Elkas to the Executive Council of Quebec as Minister of Transport and Minister of Public Security on October 11, 1989. He faced some criticism for his handling of the summer 1990 Oka Crisis, and was shuffled out of the public security role in October 1990, but retained the transport post until January 1994, when he was dropped from cabinet after Daniel Johnson succeeded Bourassa as premier.

He did not run for re-election in the 1994 Quebec general election.

He subsequently served on the governing board of Bishop's University, and the administrative council of the Port of Montreal.
