= Targray =

Canadian renewable energy business

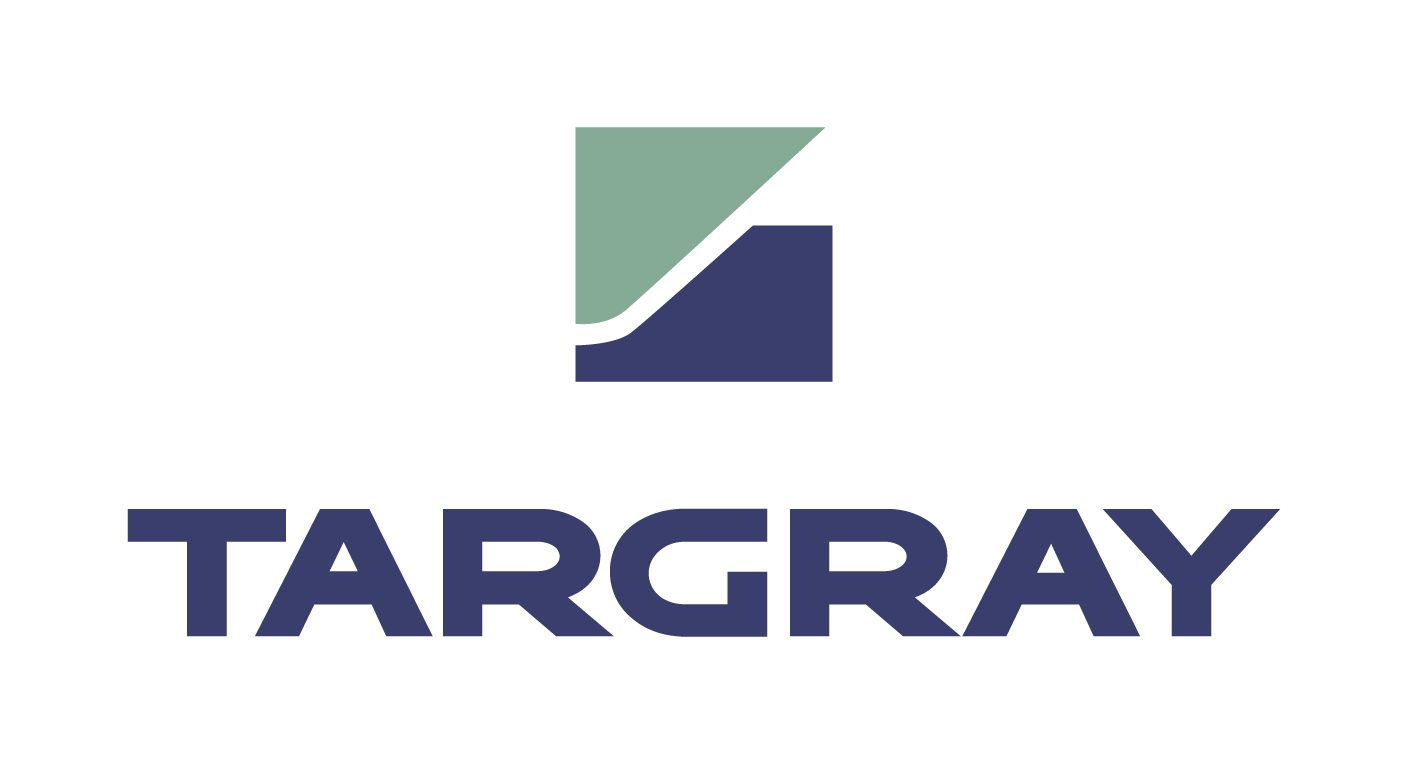
- Company type: Private
- Industry: Renewable Energy
- Founded: July 1987; 38 years ago Beaconsfield, Quebec, Canada
- Founder: Thomas A. Richardson
- Headquarters: Kirkland, Quebec
- Area served: Worldwide
- Products: Agricultural Commodities, Environmental Commodities, Biofuels, Battery Materials, Solar Materials, Optical Disc Materials.
- Revenue: ▲CAD$ 1.12 billion (2021)
- Website: Targray.com

Targray Technology International Inc., commonly referred to as Targray, is a Canadian multinational materials distributor headquartered in Kirkland, Quebec that provides commodities and distribution of pulses, biofuel, cotton, carbon trading, lithium-ion battery, energy storage, and solar photovoltaics.

Targray was established in 1987 in Beaconsfield, Quebec by metallurgical engineer Thomas A. Richardson to supply manufacturing materials and consumables for the compact disc manufacturing industry. As of 2019, the company operated sales offices, warehouses and fuel terminals in Canada, the United States, the Czech Republic, the United Arab Emirates, Belgium, Switzerland, China, Hong Kong, Taiwan and India.

== Industries ==
=== Biofuels – Biodiesel ===
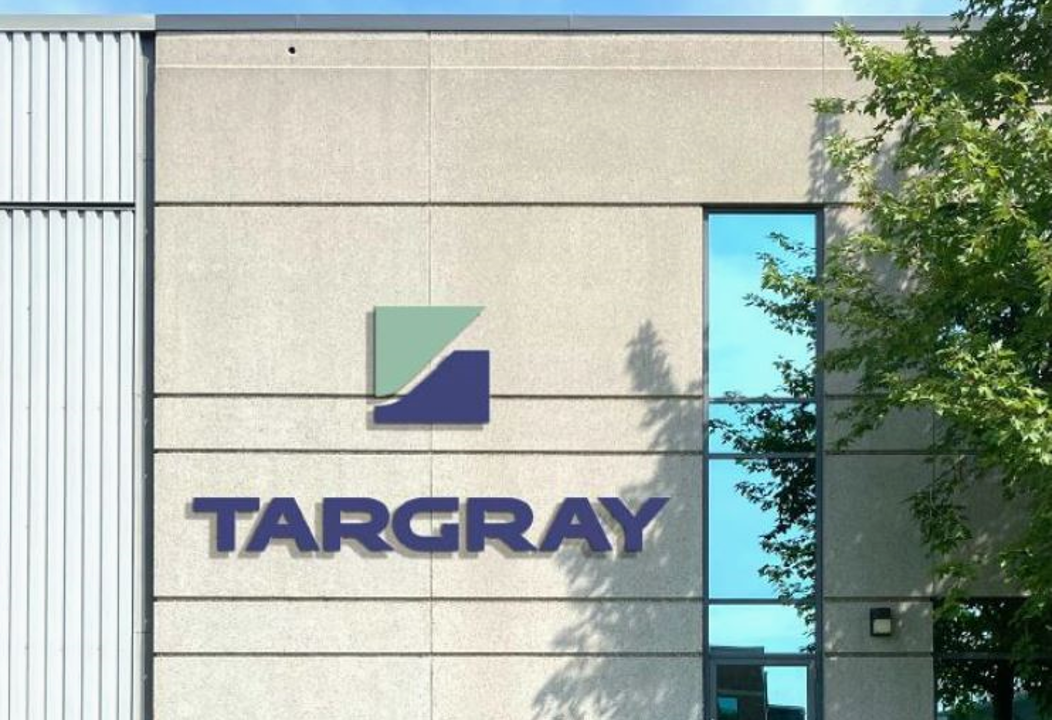
Targray Headquarters in Kirkland, Quebec, Canada.

Targray's Biofuels Division markets and trades bio-based fuels, primarily biodiesel, to local markets in the United States and Europe. The company is accredited by the National Biodiesel Board as a BQ-9000 Biodiesel Marketer, and is a registered supplier with the United States Environmental Protection Agency (EPA) and the California Air Resources Board (CARB).

In 2014, Targray opened an inventory location for its biodiesel supply in Bakersfield, California. It has since added fuel terminal locations in Stockton, Fresno and Los Angeles, California, as well as in Cincinnati, Chicago, Tampa and New Orleans.

In February 2018, the California Air Resources Board published an executive order certifying Targray's Biodiesel additive, CATANOX, as an emissions equivalent additive under Appendix 1 of the ADF regulation, which governs the introduction and use of innovative alternative diesel fuels in California. The ADF regulation includes specific provisions designed to control potential increases in oxides of nitrogen (NOx) emissions that could otherwise be caused by the use of biodiesel under certain circumstances.

In February 2019, Targray announced the establishment of a European biodiesel trading desk in Geneva, Switzerland.

=== Agricultural Commodities ===
Targray operates a pulses trading desk which engages in the sourcing, storage, trade and distribution of chickpeas, beans, lentils, peas, and other legumes. The company also participates in the wholesale distribution of cotton, sourced primarily from Benin, Mali, Burkina Faso, Ivory Coast, Brazil, Argentina, Australia and India.

=== Environmental Commodities ===
Targray's environmental commodities business supplies carbon credits, carbon offsets and renewable energy certificates for compliance and voluntary carbon markets. Its trading activities are managed on accredited carbon directories including Gold Standard and Verra.

=== Lithium-ion Batteries ===
Targray's Battery Division supplies advanced materials and electronic components used in the manufacturing of lithium-ion batteries. Notable products distributed by the Battery Division include anode materials, battery-grade lithium hydroxide, cathode materials, coated electrodes, separators, supercapacitors, current collectors, electrolyte, and packaging materials.

=== Solar – Photovoltaics ===
In 2005, Targray launched its Solar Division, which supplies raw materials, electronics, and supply chain services for the international solar photovoltaics industry. As of 2016, the company was one of the largest global suppliers of solar wafers, and polysilicon, a component used in the manufacturing of solar cells and semiconductor wafers.

In April 2017, Targray announced that it had begun supplying junction boxes for photovoltaics manufacturing.

== History ==
=== 1989-2004: Early History ===
Targray was legally incorporated in 1989 under the name Targray Technology International Inc. The company's first recorded sales were clean-room gloves sold to Americ Disc in Drummondville, Quebec. By 1995, Targray's selection of optical media products had grown to include a complete line of sputtering targets for all optical disc formats. Beginning in 1998, Targray underwent a series of expansions to accommodate its growing optical media business and workforce, and by 2004 the company had opened 5 international sales offices, located in Dordrecht, Laguna Niguel, Taipei, Panenské Břežany, and New Delhi.

=== 2005-present: Expansion and Diversification ===
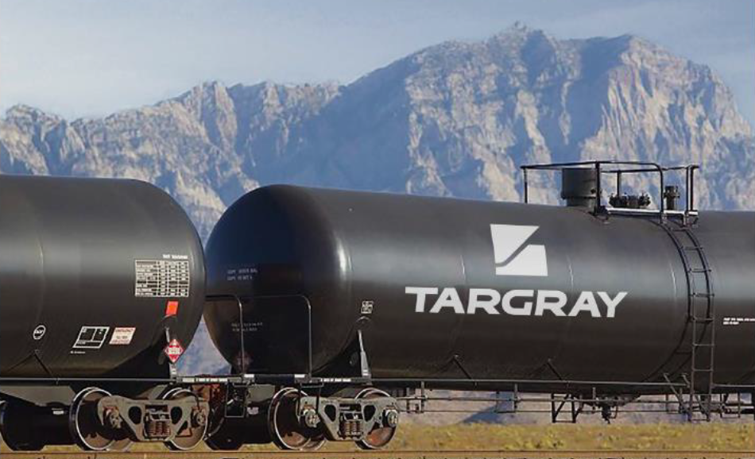
Targray Biofuels Division railcar transporting Biodiesel.

In 2005, Targray adopted a diversification strategy focused on high-growth industries, beginning with solar photovoltaics. The strategy led to an increase in sales for the company, and in 2006 it was ranked the ninth fastest-growing company in the province of Quebec for the previous five–year period by Canadian French-language magazine L'actualité. In 2008, Targray's solar products had surpassed its optical media line in total sales, and the company was included in Profit Magazine's list of fastest growing companies in Canada. In 2009, Targray's annual revenues exceeded US$250 million per year.

In 2010 and 2012, Targray established two new business divisions, created to supply lithium-ion battery materials and bio-based fuels, respectively. Shortly thereafter, the company began marketing biodiesel blends from its terminal location in California. In October 2016, professional services firm Ernst & Young named Targray President Andrew Richardson the winner of the 2016 Quebec Ernst & Young Entrepreneur of the Year Award.

In June 2022, Financial Post ranked Targray No. 297 on the FP500, an annual listing of the largest corporations in Canada by revenue.
