= Algonquin Nation Programs and Services Secretariat =

The Algonquin Nation Programs and Services Secretariat is a tribal council encompassing three Algonquin bands in Quebec, Canada. Its seat is located at Notre-Dame-du-Nord in the Abitibi-Témiscamingue region.

== Bands ==
The Algonquin Nation Programs and Services Secretariat encompasses three bands:

- Algonquins of Barriere Lake
- Timiskaming First Nation
- Wolf Lake
