= Francis Scarpaleggia =

Speaker of the Canadian House of Commons since 2025

The Honourable Francis Scarpaleggia MP
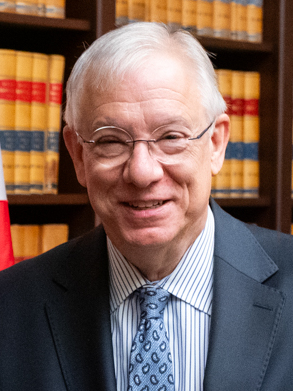
- Scarpaleggia in 2025

40th Speaker of the House of Commons
- Incumbent
- Assumed office May 26, 2025
- Preceded by: Greg Fergus

Member of Parliament for Lac-Saint-Louis
- Incumbent
- Assumed office June 28, 2004
- Preceded by: Clifford Lincoln

Personal details
- Born: June 6, 1957 (age 69) Montreal, Quebec, Canada
- Party: Liberal
- Spouse: Jan Ramsay
- Education: McGill University (BA); Columbia University (MA); Concordia University (MBA)

Francis Scarpaleggia (born June 6, 1957) is a Canadian politician who has served as the 40th speaker of the House of Commons since 2025. A member of the Liberal Party, he has been the member of Parliament (MP) for Lac-Saint-Louis since 2004.

Prior to becoming Speaker, he was chair of the House of Commons Standing Committee on Environment and Sustainable Development and previously served on a variety of House of Commons committees; namely, the committees on Public Safety, Canadian Heritage, Transport, and Government Operations and Estimates. He was also chair of the House of Commons Special Committee on Electoral Reform, a committee created pursuant to a 2015 Liberal election platform commitment on electoral reform. In 2024, he served on the Special Joint Committee Medical Assistance in Dying mandated to study "the degree of preparedness attained for a safe and adequate application of medical assistance in dying where mental disorder is the sole underlying medical condition."

From 2011 to 2021, Scarpaleggia served as the chair of the National Liberal Caucus, an eventful period in Canadian politics that saw the Liberal Party of Canada move from third-party status in the House of Commons (second opposition party) to forming government in one election cycle under the leadership of Justin Trudeau.

== Early life ==
Scarpaleggia was born in 1957, the son of Maurice Scarpaleggia, a businessman turned college administrator, and Lois Doucet. His paternal grandfather, Frank Scarpaleggia, was a Montreal barber and barbershop owner. His maternal grandfather, Louis Doucet, worked in building services at Montreal's historic Sun Life Building. His paternal grandparents immigrated from Italy and his maternal grandmother immigrated from Ireland. His maternal grandfather was French-Canadian born in Quebec.

He was raised in Laval, Quebec, and later in the Town of Mount Royal, a Montreal island suburb.

Scarpaleggia attended Loyola High School, a semi-private Jesuit-run high school in western Montreal, and subsequently Marianopolis College and McGill University where he obtained an honours degree in economics. Following graduation from McGill, he studied at Columbia University in New York, obtaining a master's degree in economics. He then obtained an Master of Business Administration at Montreal's Concordia University.

== Early career ==
Following graduation from business school, he joined the private sector working for Petro-Canada and Comterm, a Quebec-based microcomputer and keyboard-terminal manufacturer and local-area-network software developer. He subsequently entered Montreal's pharmaceutical industry as a corporate financial analyst working for Bristol-Myers Squibb, and transitioned to education, teaching business administration at Montreal's Dawson College.

== Political career ==
Scarpaleggia's involvement in politics began as a volunteer in the riding of Mount Royal during the 1981 Quebec election, working for the Liberal incumbent John Ciaccia, who was re-elected to the provincial legislature. Following the election, which saw the separatist Parti Québécois elected for a second term, he remained active as a grassroots provincial Liberal organizer, notably serving as the youngest riding president (Mount Royal provincial riding association) in the Quebec Liberal Party at the time. In 1984, he became involved in the Liberal Party of Canada in the federal riding of Mount Royal.

Prior to being elected, he worked from 1994 to 2004 as legislative assistant to Clifford Lincoln, a former environment minister in the Quebec government who then served, after entering federal politics, as parliamentary secretary to the Minister of the Environment and then as chair of the House of Commons Standing Committee on Canadian Heritage.

Scarpaleggia was first elected to Parliament in the 2004 Canadian federal election following a competitive local nomination contest.

Since first being elected, he has focused on issues of freshwater protection, introducing various water bills and motions in the House of Commons, including a bill to ban bulk-water exports. As a member of the House of Commons environment committee, he has initiated water-focused studies such a study on the Alberta oilsands industry's impacts on the Athabasca River watershed.

In 2005, Scarpaleggia was among a minority of Liberal MPs who voted against Bill C-38, legislation that formally legalized same-sex marriage in Canada. The following year, in 2006, he again broke with the Liberal Party by voting in favour, with the Conservatives, on a motion that called on the House of Commons to introduce legislation to restore the traditional definition of marriage, while preserving civil unions and respecting existing same-sex marriages. Scarpaleggia today supports same-sex marriage. On abortion, he is pro-choice. He has been publicly critical of the Constitution's notwithstanding clause, especially its pre-emptive use.

In 2025, during the Liberal leadership race following Justin Trudeau's resignation as the Liberal leader, Scarpaleggia endorsed Mark Carney.

On May 26, 2025, Scarpaleggia was elected as the 40th speaker of the House of Commons, one of six MPs, including incumbent speaker and fellow Liberal MP Greg Fergus, seeking the position.

At the time of the 2025 Canadian federal election, he lived in Sainte-Anne-de-Bellevue.

== Electoral record ==
2025 Canadian federal election: Lac-Saint-Louis
Party	Candidate	Votes	%	±%	Expenditures
Liberal	Francis Scarpaleggia	43,446	67.63	+11.37	$96,372.78
Conservative	Matthew Rusniak	15,203	23.67	+4.76	$42,736.59
Bloc Québécois	Tommy Fournier	2,330	3.63	–1.71	$3,221.59
New Democratic	Gregory Evdokias	1,877	2.92	–10.38	$485.11
Green	Raymond Frizzell	915	1.42	–1.81	$0.00
People's	Mathieu Dufort	471	0.73	–2.23	$1,318.50
Total valid votes		64,242	99.32	–	$131,928.23
Total rejected ballots		437	0.68	-0.22	
Turnout		64,679	75.06	+5.48	
Eligible voters		86,164			
Liberal hold		Swing		+3.30	
Source: Elections Canada

2021 Canadian federal election: Lac-Saint-Louis
Party	Candidate	Votes	%	±%	Expenditures
Liberal	Francis Scarpaleggia	32,477	56.3	-1.9	$82,540.53
Conservative	Ann Francis	10,911	18.9	+3.6	$6,039.07
New Democratic	Jonathan Gray	7,679	13.3	+1.1	$2,178.95
Bloc Québécois	Rémi Lebeuf	3,078	5.3	±0.0	$2,242.01
Green	Milan Kona-Mancini	1,868	3.2	-3.8	$0.00
People's	Afia Lassy	1,712	3.0	+1.6	$4,594.81
Total valid votes/expense limit		57,725	99.1	–	$113,303.53
Total rejected ballots		524	0.9		
Turnout		58,249	69.7		
Registered voters		83,616			
Liberal hold		Swing		-2.8	
Source: Elections Canada

2019 Canadian federal election: Lac-Saint-Louis
Party	Candidate	Votes	%	±%	Expenditures
Liberal	Francis Scarpaleggia	34,622	58.16	-5.97	$79,198.20
Conservative	Ann Francis	9,083	15.26	-2.16	$47,678.03
New Democratic	Dana Chevalier	7,263	12.20	-0.63	$1,823.39
Green	Milan Kona-Mancini	4,176	7.02	+4.11	$11,504.53
Bloc Québécois	Julie Benoît	3,169	5.32	+2.63	$1,149.75
People's	Gary Charles	805	1.35	–	$10,581.28
Animal Protection	Victoria de Martigny	379	0.64	–	none listed
Canadian Nationalist	Ralston Coelho	28	0.05	–	$0.00
Total valid votes/expense limit		59,525	99.26		TBD
Total rejected ballots		445	0.74	+0.23	
Turnout		59,970	71.33	-1.61	
Eligible voters		84,074			
Liberal hold		Swing		-1.90	
Source: Elections Canada

2015 Canadian federal election
Party	Candidate	Votes	%	±%	Expenditures
Liberal	Francis Scarpaleggia	39,965	64.14	+30.03	–
Conservative	Eric Girard	10,857	17.42	-11.02	–
New Democratic	Ryan Young	7,997	12.83	-17.23	–
Green	Bradford Dean	1,812	2.91	-1.36	–
Bloc Québécois	Gabriel Bernier	1,681	2.7	-0.42	–
Total valid votes/Expense limit		62,312	100.0		$224,522.81
Total rejected ballots		321	0.51	-0.02	
Turnout		62,633	73.06	+6.93	
Eligible voters		85,727			
Liberal hold		Swing		+23.63	
Source: Elections Canada

2011 Canadian federal election
Party	Candidate	Votes	%	±%	Expenditures
Liberal	Francis Scarpaleggia	18,457	34.11	-12.27	
New Democratic	Alain Ackad	16,253	30.04	+14.28	
Conservative	Larry Smith	15,394	28.45	+4.94	
Green	Bruno Tremblay	2,315	4.28	-4.30	
Bloc Québécois	Éric Taillefer	1,689	3.12	-2.62	
Total valid votes/Expense limit		54,108	100.00	–	
Rejected ballots		287	0.53	-0.01	
Turnout		54,395	66.13	+2.10	
Liberal hold		Swing		-13.28	

2008 Canadian federal election
Party	Candidate	Votes	%	±%	Expenditures
Liberal	Francis Scarpaleggia	23,842	46.38	-1.8	$71,566
Conservative	Andrea Paine	12,085	23.51	-3.2	$54,850
New Democratic	Daniel Quinn	8,105	15.76	+5.1	
Green	Peter Graham	4,415	8.58	+1.8	$7,679
Bloc Québécois	Maxime Clément	2,953	5.74	-2.0	$6,931
Total valid votes/Expense limit		51,400	100.00	–	
Rejected ballots		277	0.54		
Turnout		51,677	64.03		
Liberal hold		Swing		-2.5	

2006 Canadian federal election
Party	Candidate	Votes	%	±%	Expenditures
Liberal	Francis Scarpaleggia	25,588	48.2	-15.7	$46,751
Conservative	Andrea Paine	14,164	26.7	+14.6	$74,919
New Democratic	Daniel Quinn	5,702	10.7	+5.6	$8,129
Bloc Québécois	Anne-Marie Guertin	4,064	7.7	-2.5	$9,298
Green	Peter Graham	3,605	6.8	+1.6	$1,340
Total valid votes/Expense limit		53,123	100.0	$80,616	
Liberal hold		Swing		-215.15	

2004 Canadian federal election
Party	Candidate	Votes	%	±%	Expenditures
Liberal	Francis Scarpaleggia	32,122	63.9	-10.3	$41,498
Conservative	Jeff Howard	6,082	12.1	-2.6	$15,262
Bloc Québécois	Maxime Côté	5,106	10.2	+3.5	$7,084
New Democratic	Daniel Quinn	3,789	7.5	+5.0	$6,036
Green	Peter Graham	2,584	5.1	–	$1,808
Marijuana	Patrick Cardinal	578	1.1	-0.6	
Total valid votes/Expense limit		50,261	100.0	$79,772	
Liberal hold		Swing		-6.45	

Order of precedence
Preceded by Raymonde Gagné as Speaker of the Senate of Canada	Order of Precedence of Canada as Speaker of the House of Commons	Succeeded by Ambassadors and High Commissioners as Representatives to Canada of foreign governments
