= Carlos Leitão =

Canadian politician (born 1956)

Carlos Leitão MP

Member of Parliament for Marc-Aurèle-Fortin
- Incumbent
- Assumed office April 28, 2025
- Preceded by: Yves Robillard

Quebec Minister of Finance
- In office April 23, 2014 – October 18, 2018
- Preceded by: Nicolas Marceau
- Succeeded by: Éric Girard

Member of the National Assembly of Quebec for Robert-Baldwin
- In office April 7, 2014 – August 28, 2022
- Preceded by: Pierre Marsan
- Succeeded by: Brigitte Garceau

Personal details
- Born: March 3, 1956 (age 70) Peniche, Portugal
- Party: Quebec Liberal (provincial); Liberal (federal)
- Profession: Economist

Carlos J. Leitão MP (born 1956) is a Canadian politician in Quebec who was elected to the National Assembly of Quebec in the 2014 election. A member of the Liberal Party of Canada, he has been an MP since 2025.

== Early life and education ==
Originally from Portugal, Leitão moved to Canada in 1975. He is a alumnus of McGill University, graduating in 1979 with a bachelor of arts.

Prior to Leitão's election to the legislature, he was the chief economist for Laurentian Bank Securities.

== Career ==
Leitão represented the electoral district of Robert-Baldwin as a member of the Quebec Liberal Party until he retired from provincial politics at the 2022 Quebec general election. He was appointed Quebec minister of Finance on April 23, 2014 by Philippe Couillard.

In May 2023, Leitão was named to the Bank of Canada's board of directors.

After Mark Carney won the 2025 Liberal Party of Canada leadership election, his team reached out to Leitão, a longtime associate, to run in the federal election. Following his victory, Leitão was appointed as Parliamentary Secretary to the Minister of Industry.

At the time of the 2025 Canadian federal election, he lived in Notre-Dame-de-l'Île-Perrot.

== Electoral record ==
2025 Canadian federal election: Marc-Aurèle-Fortin
Party	Candidate	Votes	%	±%	Expenditures
Liberal	Carlos Leitão	29,928	51.99	+7.88	$39,264.14
Bloc Québécois	Claude Tousignant	13,584	23.60	–7.20	$10,128.75
Conservative	Janina Moran	11,923	20.71	+8.97	$3,948.42
New Democratic	Alexandrah Cardona-Fortin	2,128	3.70	–4.86	$0.00
Total valid votes/expense limit		57,563	98.30	–	$129,304.10
Total rejected ballots		993	1.70		
Turnout		58,556	70.63		
Eligible voters		82,902			
Liberal hold		Swing		+7.54	
Source: Elections Canada
Note: number of eligible voters does not include voting day registrations.

2018 Quebec general election: Robert-Baldwin
Party	Candidate	Votes	%	±%
Liberal	Carlos Leitão	22,426	73.85	-13.42
Coalition Avenir Québec	Laura Azéroual	3,438	11.32	+6.19
Québec solidaire	Zachary Williams	1,317	4.34	+2.46
Parti Québécois	Marie-Imalta Pierre-Lys	994	3.27	-0.43
Conservative	Michael-Louis Coppa	921	3.03	+2.68
Green	Catherine Richardson	781	2.57	+1.13
New Democratic	Luca Brown	488	1.61	
Total valid votes		30,365	99.16	
Total rejected ballots		257	0.84	
Turnout		30,622	55.60	
Eligible voters		55,075		
Liberal hold		Swing		-9.81
Source(s) "Rapport des résultats officiels du scrutin". Élections Québec.

2014 Quebec general election
Party	Candidate	Votes	%	±%
Liberal	Carlos Leitão	36,763	87.27	+12.06
Coalition Avenir Québec	Jamie Allen	2,161	5.13	-7.85
Parti Québécois	Michaël Comtois-Lussier	1,557	3.70	-1.63
Québec solidaire	Ali Faour	794	1.88	-1.04
Green	Mathieu Mireault	607	1.44	-1.22
Conservative	Patricia Popert	146	0.35	–
Option nationale	Viviane Martinova-Croteau	96	0.23	-0.29
Total valid votes		42,124	99.52	–
Total rejected ballots		203	0.48	–
Turnout		42,327	76.99	+7.90
Electors on the lists		54,979	–	–

Quebec provincial government of Philippe Couillard
Cabinet post (1)
Predecessor	Office	Successor
Nicolas Marceau	Minister of Finance; April 23, 2014–October 18, 2018	Éric Girard
