= Monsef Derraji =

Canadian politician

Monsef Derraji MNA
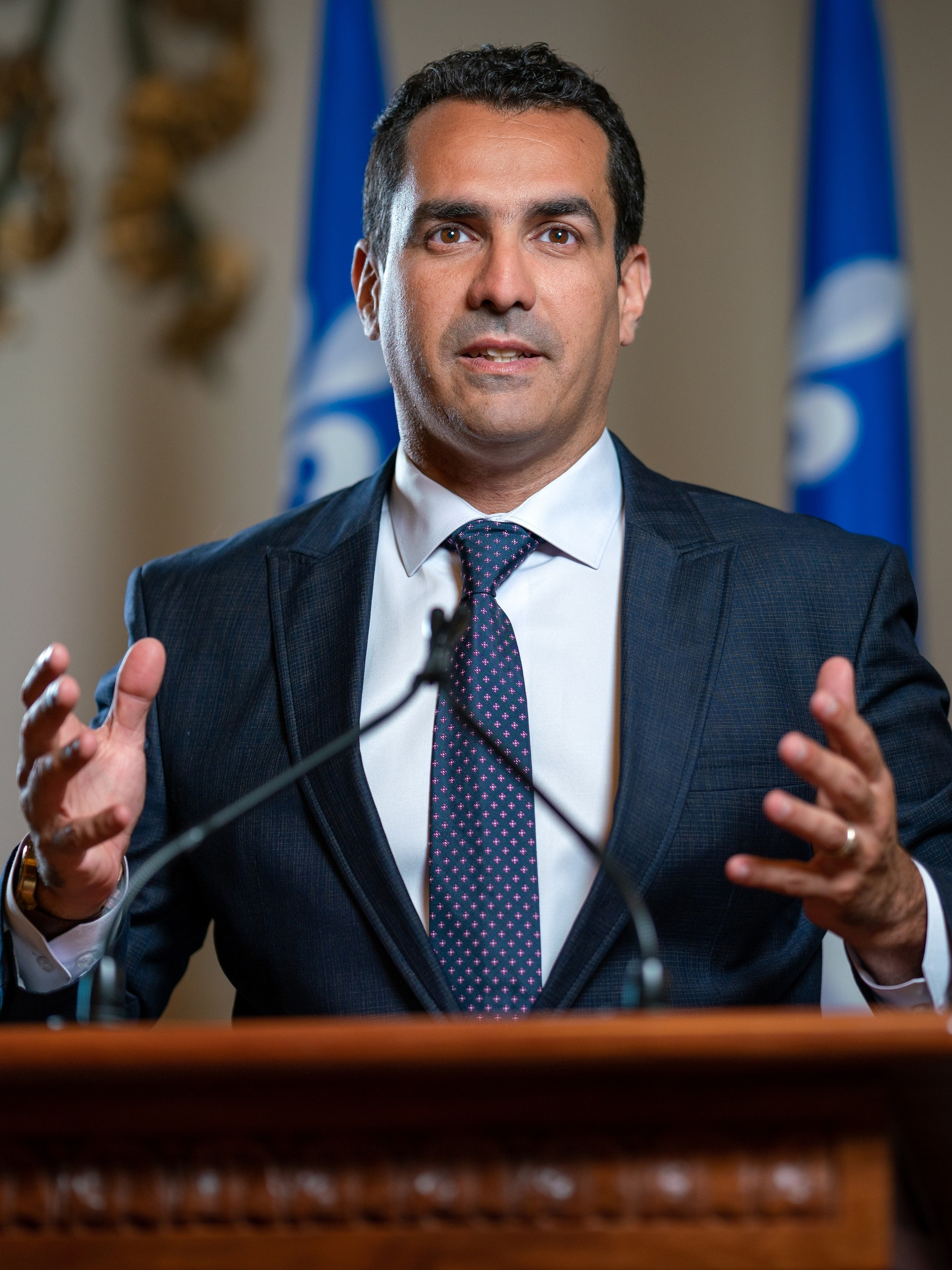

Member of the National Assembly of Quebec for Nelligan
- Incumbent
- Assumed office October 1, 2018
- Preceded by: Martin Coiteux

Personal details
- Born: August 1976 (age 50) Marrakesh, Morocco
- Party: Quebec Liberal Party
- Profession: Businessman

Monsef Derraji (born August 1976) is a Canadian politician, who was elected to the National Assembly of Quebec in the 2018 provincial election. He represents the electoral district of Nelligan as a member of the Quebec Liberal Party. As of September 7, 2024, he serves as the opposition critic for Transport and Sustainable Mobility, Democratic Institutions, Electoral Law, and Ethics.

== Electoral record ==
2026 Quebec general election: Nelligan
** Preliminary results — Not yet official **
Party	Candidate	Votes	%	±%
Liberal	Monsef Derraji	21,690	63.70	
Conservative	Gary Charles	4,872	14.31	
Parti Québécois	Martine Dubois	2,563	7.53	
Québec solidaire	Dominique Naud	2,301	6.76	
Coalition Avenir Québec	Tom Tang	1,663	4.88	
Canadian	Michael Wilkinson	493	1.45	
Green	Alex Di Pardo	470	1.38	
Total valid votes				
Total rejected ballots				
Turnout			58.97	
Electors on the lists			–	–
Source: Élections Québec

2022 Quebec general election: Nelligan
Party	Candidate	Votes	%	±%
Liberal	Monsef Derraji	17,454	52.03	-13.09
Coalition Avenir Québec	Cynthia Lapierre	5,584	16.65	-0.52
Conservative	Gary Charles	5,061	15.09	+12.08
Québec solidaire	Maxime Larue-Bourdages	1,766	5.26	-0.26
Parti Québécois	Jocelyn Caron	1,399	4.17	-0.42
Canadian	Jean Marier	1,014	3.02	–
Bloc Montreal	Neena Hanif	610	1.82	–
Green	Daniel Reiniger	558	1.66	-1.36
Démocratie directe	Michael Hennawy	100	0.30	–
Total valid votes		33,546	99.23	
Total rejected ballots		261	0.77	
Turnout		33,807	58.76	-0.82
Electors on the lists		57,537		

2018 Quebec general election: Nelligan
Party	Candidate	Votes	%	±%
Liberal	Monsef Derraji	22,421	65.12	-15.22
Coalition Avenir Québec	Angela Rapoport	5,911	17.17	+7.7
Québec solidaire	Simon Tremblay-Pepin	1,902	5.52	
Parti Québécois	Chantal Legendre	1,580	4.59	-2.35
Green	Giuseppe Cammarrota	1,040	3.02	+0.69
Conservative	Mathew Levitsky-Kaminski	1,038	3.01	+2.64
New Democratic	Leslie Eric Murphy	537	1.56	
Total valid votes		34,429	99.21	
Total rejected ballots		274	0.79	
Turnout		34,703	59.58	
Eligible voters		58,249		
Liberal hold		Swing		-11.46
Source(s) "Rapport des résultats officiels du scrutin". Élections Québec.
