= Lachine—Lac-Saint-Louis =

Former federal electoral district in Quebec, Canada

Quebec electoral district

Defunct federal electoral district
- Legislature: House of Commons
- District created: 1987
- District abolished: 1996
- First contested: 1988
- Last contested: 1993

Demographics
- Census division(s): Montreal
- Census subdivision(s): Beaconsfield, Dorval, Lachine, L'Île-Dorval, Pointe-Claire

Lachine—Lac-Saint-Louis was a federal electoral district in Quebec, Canada, that was represented in the House of Commons of Canada from 1988 to 1997.

This riding was created in 1987 from Lachine and Notre-Dame-de-Grâce—Lachine East ridings. The electoral district was abolished in 1996 and redistributed between Lac-Saint-Louis and Notre-Dame-de-Grâce—Lachine ridings.

Lachine—Lac-Saint-Louis consisted of the City of Dorval, and the towns of Beaconsfield, Ile-Dorval, Lachine and Pointe-Claire.

== Members of Parliament ==
This riding elected the following members of Parliament:

Parliament	Years	Member	Party
Lachine—Lac-Saint-Louis; Riding created from Lachine and Notre-Dame-de-Grâce—Lachine East
34th	1988–1993	Robert Layton	Progressive Conservative
35th	1993–1997	Clifford Lincoln	Liberal
Riding dissolved into Lac-Saint-Louis and Notre-Dame-de-Grâce—Lachine

== Election results ==
1993 Canadian federal election
Party	Candidate	Votes	%	±%
Liberal	Clifford Lincoln	39,714	67.43%	+23.36%
Bloc Québécois	Guy Amyot	12,012	20.40%	
Progressive Conservative	Nick Di Tomaso	4,720	8.01%	-37.35%
New Democratic	Val Udvarhely	829	1.41%	-6.51%
Independent	William Shaw	612	1.04%	
Natural Law	Ronald Bessette	551	0.94%	
Libertarian	Jim Wiebe	194	0.33%	-0.24%
Commonwealth of Canada	Claude Brosseau	176	0.30%	+0.12%
Abolitionist	Michael Robinson	85	0.14%	
Total valid votes		58,893	100.00%	

1988 Canadian federal election
Party	Candidate	Votes	%
Progressive Conservative	Bob Layton	25,870	45.36%
Liberal	Victor Drury	25,136	44.07%
New Democratic	Val Udvarhely	4,518	7.92%
Green	Marilyn K. Paxton	858	1.50%
Libertarian	Neal Ford	325	0.57%
Independent	André Davignon	227	0.40%
Commonwealth of Canada	Catherine Fortier	102	0.18%
Total valid votes		57,036	100.00%

== See also ==
- List of Canadian electoral districts
- Historical federal electoral districts of Canada
