= Kirkland, Quebec =

Kirkland
- Town
- Town of Kirkland - Ville de Kirkland
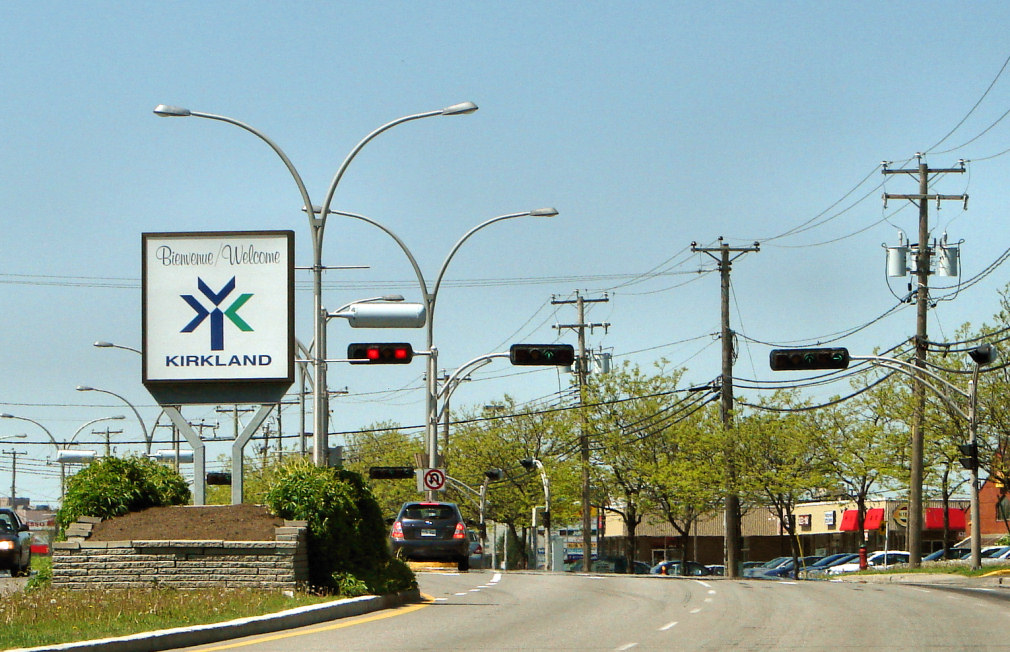
- Old "Welcome to Kirkland" sign viewed from St. Charles Blvd (heading north)

- Logo

- Location on the Island of Montreal

- Location in southern Quebec
- Coordinates: 45°27′N 73°52′W
- Country: Canada
- Province: Quebec
- Region: Montreal
- RCM: none
- Settled: 1722
- Founded: July 1, 1855
- City: March 24, 1961
- Merged with Montreal: 1 January 2002
- Reconstituted: 1 January 2006
- Named for: Charles-Aimé Kirkland

Government
  - Mayor: Michel Gibson
  - Federal riding: Lac-Saint-Louis
  - Prov. riding: Nelligan

Area
  - Land: 9.65 km^{2} (3.73 sq mi)

Population (2021)
  - Total: 19,413
  - Density: 2,012/km^{2} (5,210/sq mi)
  - Pop 2016-2021: ▼ −3.7
  - Dwellings: 6,790
- Time zone: UTC−5 (EST)
  - Summer (DST): UTC−4 (EDT)
- Postal code(s): H9J, H9K
- Area codes: 514 and 438
- Highways: A-40 (TCH)
- Website: www.ville.kirkland.qc.ca

Kirkland is an on-island suburb on the Island of Montreal in southwestern Quebec, Canada. It is named after Charles-Aimé Kirkland, a Quebec provincial politician. It was incorporated as a town in 1961.

Kirkland is primarily a residential community, with a commercial core, and an industrial park straddling the Trans-Canada Highway (Autoroute 40). In 1997, that portion of the Autoroute 40 was renamed to Félix-Leclerc Highway. The city is composed of mainly single-family residences, with some multi-unit facilities (apartments, town houses, and condos) available.

== History ==
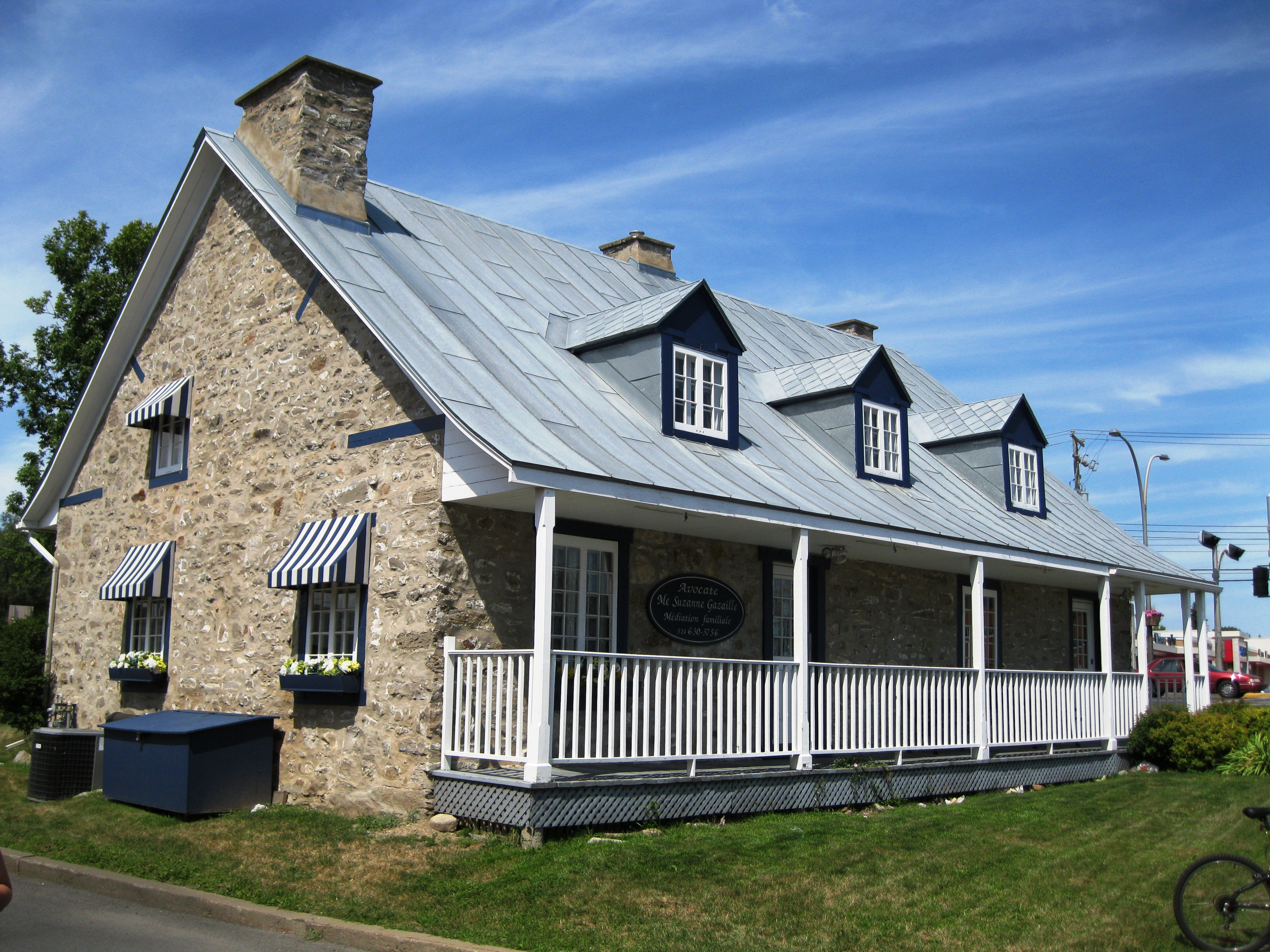
Jean-Baptiste-Jamme-Dit-Carrière House, built in 1760 along Boulevard Saint-Charles

In the early 18th century settlement began of farming communities along Côte Saint-Charles (now Boulevard Saint-Charles). By 1731, Côte Saint-Charles had 19 farms, 12 houses, and 17 barns. It was part of the Parish of Saint-Joachim de la Pointe Claire, which included the present territory of the cities of Beaconsfield, Kirkland, and Pointe-Claire. The construction of the Grand Trunk Railway in 1855 brought further development.

In 1845, the Municipality of Pointe-Claire was created, abolished two years later and restored in 1855 as the Parish Municipality of Saint-Joachim-de-la-Pointe-Claire (or just Pointe-Claire). In 1910, Beaconsfield split off to form a separate town. In 1955, large portions of the parish municipality were annexed by the City of Pointe-Claire (originally the Village Municipality of Saint-Joachim-de-la-Pointe-Claire) and by the Parish of Sainte-Geneviève. Attempts in the late 1950s by the City of Beaconsfield to annex the municipality started the process to become a town.

In March 1961, it changed status to become a ville (town/city) and took the name Kirkland. That same year, the construction began of the Trans-Canada Highway (Autoroute 40), completed in 1964.

On January 1, 2002, as part of the 2002–2006 municipal reorganization of Montreal, it was merged into the city of Montreal and became a borough. However, after a change of government and a 2004 referendum, it was re-constituted as an independent municipality on January 1, 2006.

== Demographics ==
Historical populations
Year	Pop.	±%
1861	1,190	—
1871	1,011	−15.0%
1881	890	−12.0%
1891	823	−7.5%
1901	800	−2.8%
1911	805	+0.6%
1921	509	−36.8%
1931	546	+7.3%
1941	536	−1.8%
1951	622	+16.0%
1956	364	−41.5%
1961	572	+57.1%
1966	659	+15.2%
1971	2,917	+342.6%
1976	7,476	+156.3%
1981	10,476	+40.1%
1986	13,376	+27.7%
1991	17,495	+30.8%
1996	18,678	+6.8%
2001	20,434	+9.4%
2006	20,491	+0.3%
2011	21,253	+3.7%
2016	20,151	−5.2%
2021	19,413	−3.7%
Source: Statistics Canada

According to the Office québécois de la langue française, Kirkland has been officially recognized as a bilingual municipality since 2005-11-02.

In the 2021 Census of Population conducted by Statistics Canada, Kirkland had a population of 19,413 living in 6,666 of its 6,790 total private dwellings, a change of −3.7% from its 2016 population of 20,151. With a land area of 9.65 km^{2} (3.73 sq mi), it had a population density of 2,011.7/km^{2} (5,210.3/sq mi) in 2021.

Canada census – Kirkland, Quebec community profile

	2021	2016
Population	19,413 (-3.7% from 2016)	20,151 (-5,2% from 2011)
Land area	9.65 km^{2} (3.73 sq mi)	9.63 km^{2} (3.72 sq mi)
Population density	2,012.0/km^{2} (5,211/sq mi)	2,092.8/km^{2} (5,420/sq mi)
Median age	46.4 (M: 45.2, F: 47.2)	45.5 (M: 44.6, F: 46.2)
Private dwellings	6,790 (total)	6,779 (total)
Median household income		$115,381

References: 2021 2016

Home Language (2021)
Language	Population	Percentage (%)
English	11,535	60%
French	2,630	14%
Other	3,595	19%

Mother Tongue (2021)
Language	Population	Percentage (%)
English	7,540	39%
French	3,270	17%
Other	7,065	36%

Visible Minorities (2021)
Ethnicity	Population	Percentage (%)
Not a visible minority	13,150	68%
Visible minorities	6,090	32%

== Economy ==
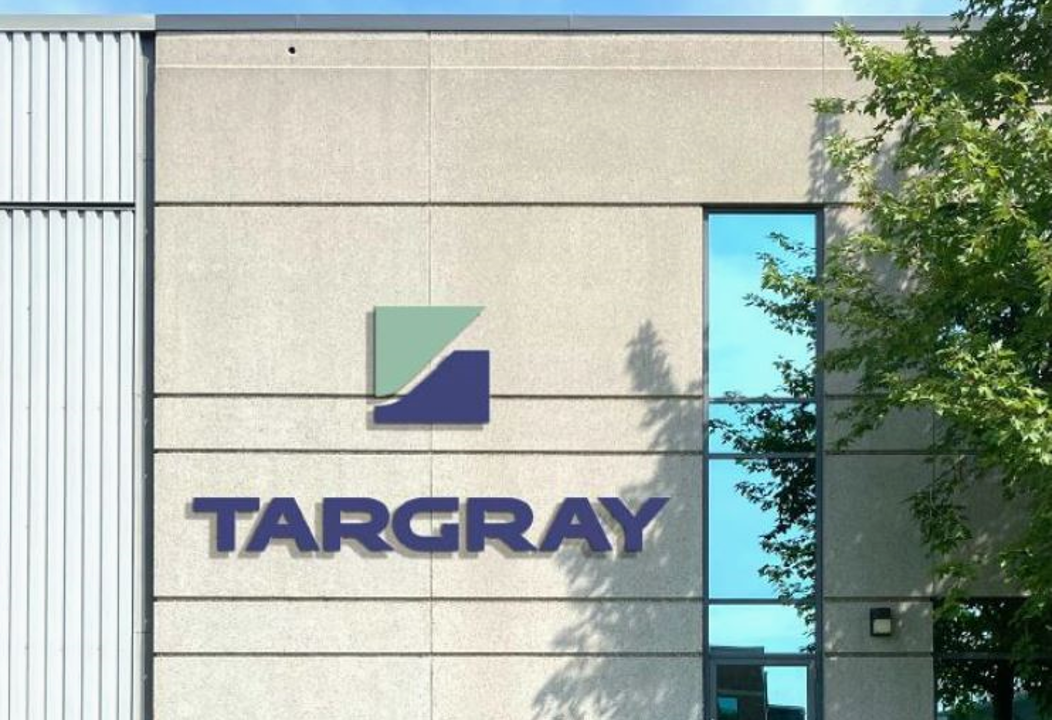
Targray head office, in Kirkland

The town of Kirkland has a large business and industrial park spanning both sides of Autoroute 40. Companies in the area operate in a wide range of industries including aerospace, electronic goods, pharmaceuticals, printed goods, renewable energy, software engineering, telecommunications, petrochemicals, and transportation.

Notable employers in the city of Kirkland include:

- Broccolini Construction
- Jubilant DraxImage
- Merck & Co.
- Nissan
- Pfizer
- Targray
- Zodiac Aerospace
- Zoetis

== Arts and culture ==
=== Public Library ===
The Kirkland Public Library has a collection of more than 80,000 volumes in French and English for adults, teens and children. The library also offers online database searching, children and adult programs, computer rooms, wireless Internet, inter-library loans, photocopying and reserved books.

=== Special events ===
Kirkland Day, which takes place mid-June, is a big outdoor annual festival celebrating the inauguration of the Town of Kirkland on March 24, 1961. The first Kirkland Day was held on June 20, 1970, at the dedication of Kirkland Park. Since then, Kirkland residents come out in great numbers every year to celebrate the town together.

Other events within the town include:

- Winter Carnival
- Kirkland Day
- Mini Olympics
- Kirkland Food Drive
- Christmas Events

== Sports ==
=== Parks, green space and sport facilities ===
Kirkland Sports Complex has an indoor gymnasium that offers badminton, basketball, floor hockey, volleyball and other indoor sport activities, as well as an arena for hockey, ringette, free or figure skating.

Around the town there are multiple outdoor centres for soccer, baseball, tennis, football, basketball, beach volleyball and ice rinks as well as a 5-kilometre (3.1 mi) bike trail. There are three splash pads, at Harris Park, Héritage Park, and Meades Park. Notably, Meades Park includes a universal playground, making it accessible to children with disabilities. There is also a community pool offered in this town, which is at Ecclestone Park.

The Town of Kirkland has many halls and park chalets, which citizens, associations and organizations can rent out for different occasions or activities (banquets, meetings, parties, exhibits, shows, etc.):

- Sports Complex
- Ecclestone Chalet
- Holleuffer Chalet
- Kirkland Chalet
- Lantier House
- Conference room (Kirkland Public Library)
- Dés Bénévoles Chalet
- Meades Park (on the same grounds as the sports complex)
- Canvin Park
- Kirkland Park
- Robbie-Loftus Park
- Park du Chablis
- Park Syrah
- Park Moreau
- Park Fewtrell
- Park Dance
- Park Letarte

== Government ==
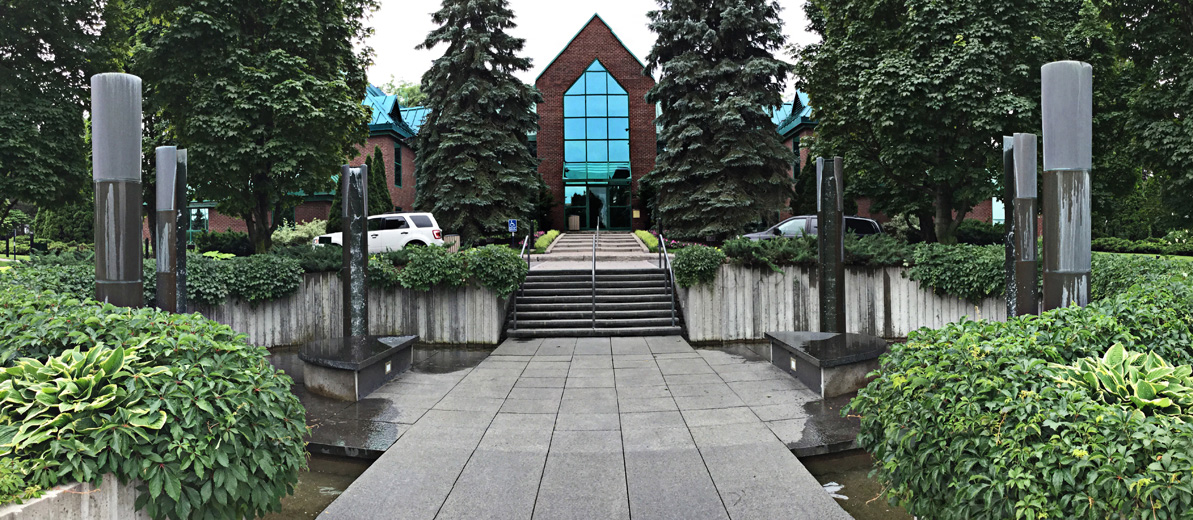
Kirkland Town Hall

The territory of the Town of Kirkland is divided into eight electoral districts. Each district is represented by a councillor elected by the voters of that district. The mayor is elected by all voters and represents the entire territory.

It is a full-service community, with a public works department, recreation department, engineering department, accounting, communications, human resources and administrative services operating for the welfare of its citizens.

The present mayor is now Michel Gibson, who has been a member of the Kirkland City Council since the mid-1970s.

1. Michael Brown (District 1 - Timberlea)
2. Luciano Piciacchia (District 2 - Holleuffer)
3. Samuel Rother (District 3 - Brunswick)
4. Domenico Zito (District 4 - Lacey Green West)
5. Stephen Bouchard (District 5 - Lacey Green East)
6. John Morson (District 6 - Canvin)
7. Paul Dufort (District 7 - St. Charles)
8. Karen Cliffe (District 8 - Summerhill)

=== Former mayors ===
List of former mayors:

- Jean-Baptiste Théoret (1845–1847)
- Francois Valois (1855–1858, 1864–1868)
- Gabriël Valois (1858–1860, 1869–71, 1881–1887)
- Pierre Charles Valois (1860–1864)
- Leon Legault (1864, 1872–1881)
- Joste Legaut (1887–1895)
- Jean Bte Valérie Quesnel (1896–1909)
- Gédéon Legault (1910–1914)
- Daniel Arthur Legault (1915–1918)
- Joseph Dosithée Legault (1919–1925)
- Ernest Brunet (1925–1927)
- Joseph Anthime Legault (1927–1931)
- Ovila Brunet (1931–1939)
- Joseph Glaude Zetique Asénor Legault (1939–1941)
- Aimé Legault (1941–1945)
- Edmé Brunet (1945–1953)
- André Brunet (1953–1957, 1965–1968)
- W. Wallace Horne (1957–1958)
- James A. Smiley (1958, 1968–1975)
- Marcel Meloche (1958–1965)
- Samuel L. Elkas (1975–1989)
- John William Meaney (1989, 1994–2002, 2006–2013)
- Nunzio "Nick" Discepola (1989–1993)
- Michel Gibson (1993–1994, 2013–present)
- Brian MacDonald (1994)

== Education ==
The Centre de services scolaire Marguerite-Bourgeoys operates Francophone public schools, but were previously operated by the Commission scolaire Marguerite-Bourgeoys until June 15, 2020.

Previously school districts were on religious grounds, but a law passed by the Quebec parliament changed the school board system from denominational to linguistic.

Professional development centres:

- Centre de formation professionnelle des métiers de la santé

Primary schools:

- École primaire Émile-Nelligan

The Lester B. Pearson School Board (LBPSB) operates anglophone public schools in the area.

Primary schools:

- Margaret Manson Elementary School
- Some areas are served by Sherbrooke Academy (junior and senior campuses) and Beacon Hill Elementary School in Beaconsfield, Clearpoint Elementary School in Pointe-Claire, and Kingsdale Academy in Pierrefonds-Roxboro

Private preschool, primary and high school:

- Kuper Academy

The Federation of Private Schools, FEEP (Féderation des establissements d'enseignement privés) operates bilingual (French/English) private schools in the area:

Preschool, kindergarten, primary school and high school:

- Académie Marie-Claire

== Notable people ==
- Nick Discepola, former mayor, former Member of Parliament for Vaudreuil-Soulanges
- Tanith Belbin, Canadian-American ice dancer
- Joseph Veleno, hockey player
- Louis Leblanc, hockey player
- Randy McKay, hockey player
- Brandon Reid, hockey player
- Sergio Momesso, hockey player
- Marc Denis, radio personality
- Charles Daudelin, artist, pioneer in integrating art in public
- Michael Regina, co-founder of TheOneRing.net
- James Pantemis, Canadian soccer goalkeeper

== See also ==
- List of anglophone communities in Quebec
- List of former boroughs
- 2002–2006 municipal reorganization of Montreal
- 2000–2006 municipal reorganization in Quebec
