= Russell Williams (politician) =

Canadian politician

Member of the Quebec National Assembly for Nelligan
- In office September 25, 1989 – March 9, 2004
- Preceded by: Clifford Lincoln
- Succeeded by: Yolande James

Personal details
- Born: January 31, 1953 (age 73) London, Ontario, Canada
- Party: Quebec Liberal Party

Russell Williams (born January 31, 1953) is a Canadian politician, and a cabinet minister and a four-term Member of the National Assembly of Quebec.

== Early life ==
Russell Williams was born in London, Ontario in 1953 to Harold and Gloria (Higgins) Williams. Williams completed high school in Beaconsfield, later attending was educated at the Sir George Williams University (which later became Concordia University), where he received his Bachelor of Arts in Applied Social Studies in 1976.

Williams was the director of the YMCA in Montreal during the 1980s, working as the executive director as well as the director of community initiatives. He was also active as a member of Alliance Quebec in the late 1980s. He briefly served as the director of the Health Council of the Brant Region as well as director of the Canadian Foundation for Human Rights.

== Member of the National Assembly ==
Williams ran for the Liberal Party in the Montreal riding of Nelligan in the 1989 election, replacing Clifford Lincoln, who had moved to federal politics. Williams was safely re-elected in the 1994, 1998, and 2003 elections.

As a member of the National Assembly, he served as Parliamentary Assistant to the Minister for Intergovernmental Affairs between 1989 and 1991. Later, he assisted the Minister of Health and Social Services and the Minister of Employment. After the Liberal Party's defeat in the 1994 election, Williams served in a smaller capacity, co-chairing commissions on social affairs and finance. When Jean Charest led the Liberals to victory in the 2003 election, Williams again became Parliamentary Assistant to the Minister of Health and Social Services until his resignation in March 2004.

As a Member of the National Assembly, "he led numerous public policy debates on important and complex issues, such as the role of government in research and development (R&D), compensation for victims of contaminated blood, linguistic policy, access to services for the disabled, and pre-hospital emergency services".

== Later career ==
Shortly after leaving the National Assembly, Williams became the President of Canada’s Research-Based Pharmaceutical Companies (Rx&D), a pressure group based in Ottawa. He is an active volunteer with people suffering from long-term illness and other issues of palliative care.

Williams was briefly in the spotlight again in 2010, when Colonel Russell Williams was tried for multiple rapes and murders in Ontario. Patrick Lagacé of La Presse blogged about the two men's names following a press release from Rx&D.
