= Robert-Baldwin =

Provincial electoral district in Quebec, Canada

Coordinates: 45.500°N 73.816°W

Quebec electoral district
- Location in Montreal

Provincial electoral district
- Legislature: National Assembly of Quebec
MNA
Brigitte Garceau
Liberal
- District created: 1965
- First contested: 1966
- Last contested: 2026

Demographics
- Population (2011): 76,965
- Electors (2018): 55,075
- Area (km²): 24.6
- Pop. density (per km²): 3,128.7
- Census division: Montreal (part)
- Census subdivision(s): Montreal (part), Dollard-des-Ormeaux

Robert-Baldwin is a provincial electoral district in the Montreal region of Quebec, Canada. that elects members to the National Assembly of Quebec. It includes a portion of the Pierrefonds-Roxboro borough of Montreal as well as the city of Dollard-des-Ormeaux.

It was created for the 1966 election from a part of Jacques-Cartier.

In the change from the 2001 to the 2011 electoral map, it gained a small additional part of Pierrefonds-Roxboro from the Nelligan electoral district.

It was named after former premier of the United Province of Canada, Robert Baldwin.

== Linguistic demographics ==
- Anglophone: 38.9%
- Allophone: 39.0%
- Francophone: 22.1%

== Members of the Legislative Assembly / National Assembly ==
| Legislature | Years | Member | Party |
|---|---|---|---|
Riding created from Jacques-Cartier
| 28th | 1966–1967 | Arthur-Ewan Séguin | Independent |
| 28th | 1967–1970 | Arthur-Ewan Séguin | Liberal |
| 29th | 1970–1973 | Arthur-Ewan Séguin | Liberal |
| 30th | 1973–1976 | Jean Cournoyer | Liberal |
| 31st | 1976–1981 | John O'Gallagher | Liberal |
| 32nd | 1981–1985 | John O'Gallagher | Liberal |
| 33rd | 1985–1989 | Pierre MacDonald | Liberal |
| 34th | 1989–1994 | Sam Elkas | Liberal |
| 35th | 1994–1998 | Pierre Marsan | Liberal |
| 36th | 1998–2003 | Pierre Marsan | Liberal |
| 37th | 2003–2007 | Pierre Marsan | Liberal |
| 38th | 2007–2008 | Pierre Marsan | Liberal |
| 39th | 2008–2012 | Pierre Marsan | Liberal |
| 40th | 2012–2014 | Pierre Marsan | Liberal |
| 41st | 2014–2018 | Carlos Leitão | Liberal |
| 42nd | 2018–2022 | Carlos Leitão | Liberal |
| 43rd | 2022–2026 | Brigitte Garceau | Liberal |
| 44th | 2026–Present | Brigitte Garceau | Liberal |

== Election results ==
2026 Quebec general election
** Preliminary results — Not yet official **
| Party | Candidate | Votes | % | ±% |
|---|---|---|---|---|
| Liberal | Brigitte Garceau | 19,984 | 65.05 | |
| Conservative | Axel Lellouche | 4,653 | 15.15 | |
| Québec solidaire | Alexandra Lacoste | 2,705 | 8.80 | |
| Parti Québécois | Maurice Daude | 1,505 | 4.90 | |
| Coalition Avenir Québec | Sophie Leroux | 1,035 | 3.37 | |
| Canadian | Paul Henry Danylewich | 532 | 1.73 | |
| Green | Hélène Savard | 309 | 1.01 | |
| Total valid votes | | | | |
| Total rejected ballots | | | | |
| Turnout | | | 56.27 | |
| Electors on the lists | | | – | – |
| Liberal hold | | Swing | | |
Source: Élections Québec

2022 Quebec general election
| Party | Candidate | Votes | % | ±% |
|---|---|---|---|---|
| Liberal | Brigitte Garceau | 17,228 | 57.76 | -16.09 |
| Conservative | Axel Lellouche | 4,779 | 16.02 | +12.99 |
| Coalition Avenir Québec | Maïté Beaudoin | 2,909 | 9.75 | -1.57 |
| Québec solidaire | Marieve Ruel | 1,498 | 5.02 | +0.68 |
| Canadian | Jonathan Gray | 1,231 | 4.13 | – |
| Bloc Montreal | Qaiser Choudhry | 792 | 2.66 | – |
| Parti Québécois | Alix Martel | 776 | 2.60 | -0.67 |
| Green | David MacFarquhar | 614 | 2.06 | -0.51 |
| Total valid votes | | 29,827 | 99.15 | – |
| Total rejected ballots | | 257 | 0.85 | – |
| Turnout | | 30,084 | 55.80 | +0.20 |
| Electors on the lists | | 53,910 | – | – |

2018 Quebec general election
| Party | Candidate | Votes | % | ±% |
|---|---|---|---|---|
| Liberal | Carlos Leitão | 22,426 | 73.85 | -13.42 |
| Coalition Avenir Québec | Laura Azéroual | 3,438 | 11.32 | +6.19 |
| Québec solidaire | Zachary Williams | 1,317 | 4.34 | +2.46 |
| Parti Québécois | Marie-Imalta Pierre-Lys | 994 | 3.27 | -0.43 |
| Conservative | Michael-Louis Coppa | 921 | 3.03 | +2.68 |
| Green | Catherine Richardson | 781 | 2.57 | +1.13 |
| New Democratic | Luca Brown | 488 | 1.61 | |
| Total valid votes | | 30,365 | 99.16 | |
| Total rejected ballots | | 257 | 0.84 | |
| Turnout | | 30,622 | 55.60 | |
| Eligible voters | | 55,075 | | |
| Liberal hold | | Swing | | -9.81 |
Source(s) "Rapport des résultats officiels du scrutin". Élections Québec.

2014 Quebec general election
| Party | Candidate | Votes | % | ±% |
|---|---|---|---|---|
| Liberal | Carlos Leitão | 36,763 | 87.27 | +12.06 |
| Coalition Avenir Québec | Jamie Allen | 2,161 | 5.13 | -7.85 |
| Parti Québécois | Michaël Comtois-Lussier | 1,557 | 3.70 | -1.63 |
| Québec solidaire | Ali Faour | 794 | 1.88 | -1.04 |
| Green | Mathieu Mireault | 607 | 1.44 | -1.22 |
| Conservative | Patricia Popert | 146 | 0.35 | – |
| Option nationale | Viviane Martinova-Croteau | 96 | 0.23 | -0.29 |
| Total valid votes | | 42,124 | 99.52 | – |
| Total rejected ballots | | 203 | 0.48 | – |
| Turnout | | 42,327 | 76.99 | +7.90 |
| Electors on the lists | | 54,979 | – | – |

2012 Quebec general election
| Party | Candidate | Votes | % | ±% |
|---|---|---|---|---|
| Liberal | Pierre Marsan | 27,904 | 75.21 | -5.86 |
| Coalition Avenir Québec | Toni Rinow | 4,817 | 12.98 | +8.82* |
| Parti Québécois | Alexandre Pagé-Chassé | 1,978 | 5.33 | -2.28 |
| Québec solidaire | Sarah Landry | 1,083 | 2.92 | +1.14 |
| Green | Mathieu Mireault | 988 | 2.66 | -2.37 |
| Option nationale | Sophie Turcot | 194 | 0.52 | – |
| Quebec Citizens' Union | Fredrick-Anthony Ghali | 138 | 0.37 | – |
| Total valid votes | | 37,102 | 99.38 | – |
| Total rejected ballots | | 231 | 0.62 | – |
| Turnout | | 37,333 | 69.09 | +27.57 |
| Electors on the lists | | 54,033 | – | – |

* Result compared to Action démocratique

2008 Quebec general election
| Party | Candidate | Votes | % | ±% |
|---|---|---|---|---|
| Liberal | Pierre Marsan | 17,078 | 81.07 | +6.31 |
| Parti Québécois | Alexandre Pagé-Chassé | 1,602 | 7.61 | +2.27 |
| Green | Maryse Goulet | 1,059 | 5.03 | -2.18 |
| Action démocratique | Alexandra Lauzon | 877 | 4.16 | -6.79 |
| Québec solidaire | Sarah Landry | 375 | 1.78 | +0.04 |
| Marxist–Leninist | Nicholas Lin | 74 | 0.35 | – |
| Total valid votes | | 21,065 | 99.35 | – |
| Total rejected ballots | | 138 | 0.65 | – |
| Turnout | | 21,203 | 41.52 | -17.10 |
| Electors on the lists | | 51,062 | – | – |

2007 Quebec general election
| Party | Candidate | Votes | % | ±% |
|---|---|---|---|---|
| Liberal | Pierre Marsan | 22,132 | 74.76 | -11.11 |
| Action démocratique | Ginette Lemire | 3,242 | 10.95 | +5.88 |
| Green | Shawn Katz | 2,136 | 7.21 | – |
| Parti Québécois | Alexandre Pagé-Chassé | 1,581 | 5.34 | -2.50 |
| Québec solidaire | Jocelyne Messih | 514 | 1.74 | – |
| Total valid votes | | 29,605 | 99.48 | – |
| Total rejected ballots | | 156 | 0.52 | – |
| Turnout | | 29,761 | 58.62 | -6.64 |
| Electors on the lists | | 50,769 | – | – |

2003 Quebec general election
| Party | Candidate | Votes | % | ±% |
|---|---|---|---|---|
| Liberal | Pierre Marsan | 28,892 | 85.87 | +1.79 |
| Parti Québécois | Alphonse Boisrond | 2,637 | 7.84 | -1.43 |
| Action démocratique | Alladin Abou Sharbin | 1,705 | 5.07 | +1.96 |
| Equality | Jimmy D. Kalafatidis | 411 | 1.22 | -1.54 |
| Total valid votes | | 33,645 | 99.26 | – |
| Total rejected ballots | | 250 | 0.74 | – |
| Turnout | | 33,895 | 65.26 | -12.80 |
| Electors on the lists | | 51,935 | – | – |

1998 Quebec general election
| Party | Candidate | Votes | % | ±% |
|---|---|---|---|---|
| Liberal | Pierre Marsan | 31,702 | 84.08 | +1.10 |
| Parti Québécois | André Allard | 3,494 | 9.27 | -0.57 |
| Action démocratique | Virsna Chau | 1,173 | 3.11 | +0.58 |
| Equality | Jimmy D. Kalafatidis | 1,042 | 2.76 | +0.07 |
| Bloc Pot | Jean-François Labrecque | 295 | 0.78 | – |
| Total valid votes | | 37,706 | 99.48 | – |
| Total rejected ballots | | 196 | 0.52 | – |
| Turnout | | 37,902 | 78.06 | -7.11 |
| Electors on the lists | | 48,552 | – | – |

1995 Quebec referendum
| Side | Votes | % |
|---|---|---|
| Non | 38,956 | 89.83 |
| Oui | 4,410 | 10.17 |

1994 Quebec general election
| Party | Candidate | Votes | % | ±% |
|---|---|---|---|---|
| Liberal | Pierre Marsan | 29,865 | 82.98 | +36.93 |
| Parti Québécois | Nicolas Tétrault | 3,541 | 9.84 | −3.09 |
| Equality | Bart Sellitto | 969 | 2.69 | −38.33 |
| Action démocratique | Mario Pilote Jr. | 909 | 2.53 | – |
| CANADA! | Harry Polansky | 364 | 1.01 | – |
| Natural Law | Ruby Finkelstein | 123 | 0.34 | – |
| Republic of Canada | Robert Charles | 120 | 0.33 | – |
| Innovator | Martin Leduc | 99 | 0.28 | – |
| Total valid votes | | 35,990 | 99.20 | – |
| Rejected and declined votes | | 291 | 0.80 | – |
| Turnout | | 36,281 | 85.17 | +10.50 |
| Electors on the lists | | 42,600 | – | – |
Source: Official Results, Le Directeur général des élections du Québec.

1992 Charlottetown Accord referendum
| Side | Votes | % |
|---|---|---|
| Oui | 28,184 | 82.59 |
| Non | 5,941 | 17.41 |

1989 Quebec general election
| Party | Candidate | Votes | % | ±% |
|---|---|---|---|---|
| Liberal | Sam Elkas | 12,671 | 46.05 | -34.49 |
| Equality | Adrian Weller | 11,287 | 41.02 | – |
| Parti Québécois | Yves Morin | 3,557 | 12.93 | -0.99 |

1985 Quebec general election
| Party | Candidate | Votes | % | ±% |
|---|---|---|---|---|
| Liberal | Pierre MacDonald | 27,041 | 80.54 | +2.70 |
| Parti Québécois | Michelle Dozois | 4,673 | 13.92 | -5.36 |
| New Democratic | René Boulard | 1,068 | 3.18 | – |
| Progressive Conservative | Hugh Rowe | 467 | 1.39 | – |
| Union Nationale | Germaine A. Tremblay-White | 164 | 0.49 | -0.26 |
| Commonwealth of Canada | Robert McMahon | 161 | 0.48 | – |

1981 Quebec general election
| Party | Candidate | Votes | % | ±% |
|---|---|---|---|---|
| Liberal | John O’Gallagher | 26,865 | 77.84 | +41.73 |
| Parti Québécois | Gisèle Hurtubise | 6,651 | 19.28 | +0.75 |
| Freedom of Choice | Duncan C. Macdonald | 495 | 1.43 | – |
| Union Nationale | Howard Boucher | 260 | 0.75 | -25.51 |
| Libertarian | Hugh Rowe | 240 | 0.70 | – |

1980 Quebec referendum
| Side | Votes | % |
|---|---|---|
| Non | 39,977 | 81.34 |
| Oui | 9,170 | 18.66 |

1976 Quebec general election
| Party | Candidate | Votes | % | ±% |
|---|---|---|---|---|
| Liberal | John O’Gallagher | 14,476 | 36.11 | -44.92 |
| Union Nationale | Dorothy Bryan Barker | 10,529 | 26.26 | +25.36 |
| Parti Québécois | Gilles Corbeil | 7,430 | 18.53 | +2.80 |
| Independent | Robert G. Beale | 4,827 | 12.04 | – |
| Democratic Alliance | George Donald Boutilier | 2,188 | 5.46 | – |
| Ralliement créditiste | Louis Lefebvre | 410 | 1.02 | -1.15 |
| Independent | Leo Rotgaus | 233 | 0.58 | – |

1973 Quebec general election
| Party | Candidate | Votes | % | ±% |
|---|---|---|---|---|
| Liberal | Jean Cournoyer | 26,189 | 81.03 | -6.43 |
| Parti Québécois | Serge Brodeur | 5,083 | 15.73 | +6.54 |
| Parti créditiste | Jean J. St-Georges | 701 | 2.17 | – |
| Union Nationale | Léopold Hamel | 293 | 0.90 | -2.45 |
| Marxist–Leninist | Arthur Vachon | 55 | 0.17 | – |

1970 Quebec general election
| Party | Candidate | Votes | % | ±% |
|---|---|---|---|---|
| Liberal | Arthur-Ewen Séguin | 46,169 | 87.46 | +34.14 |
| Parti Québécois | Jacques Rivest | 4,853 | 9.19 | – |
| Union Nationale | William F. Shaw | 1,769 | 3.35 | -4.83 |

1966 Quebec general election
| Party | Candidate | Votes | % |
|---|---|---|---|
| Independent | Arthur-Ewen Séguin | 19,506 | 53.32 |
| Liberal | Norman Wray | 11,754 | 32.13 |
| Union Nationale | Maurice Provost | 2,991 | 8.18 |
| Independent | John Patrick Boyle | 1,287 | 3.52 |
| RIN | Yves Gariépy | 900 | 2.46 |
| Ralliement national | Jean-Paul Trudel | 144 | 0.39 |

== See also ==
- List of Quebec provincial electoral districts
- Canadian provincial electoral districts
