= Algonquins of Barriere Lake =

Alonquin First Nation in Quebec, Canada

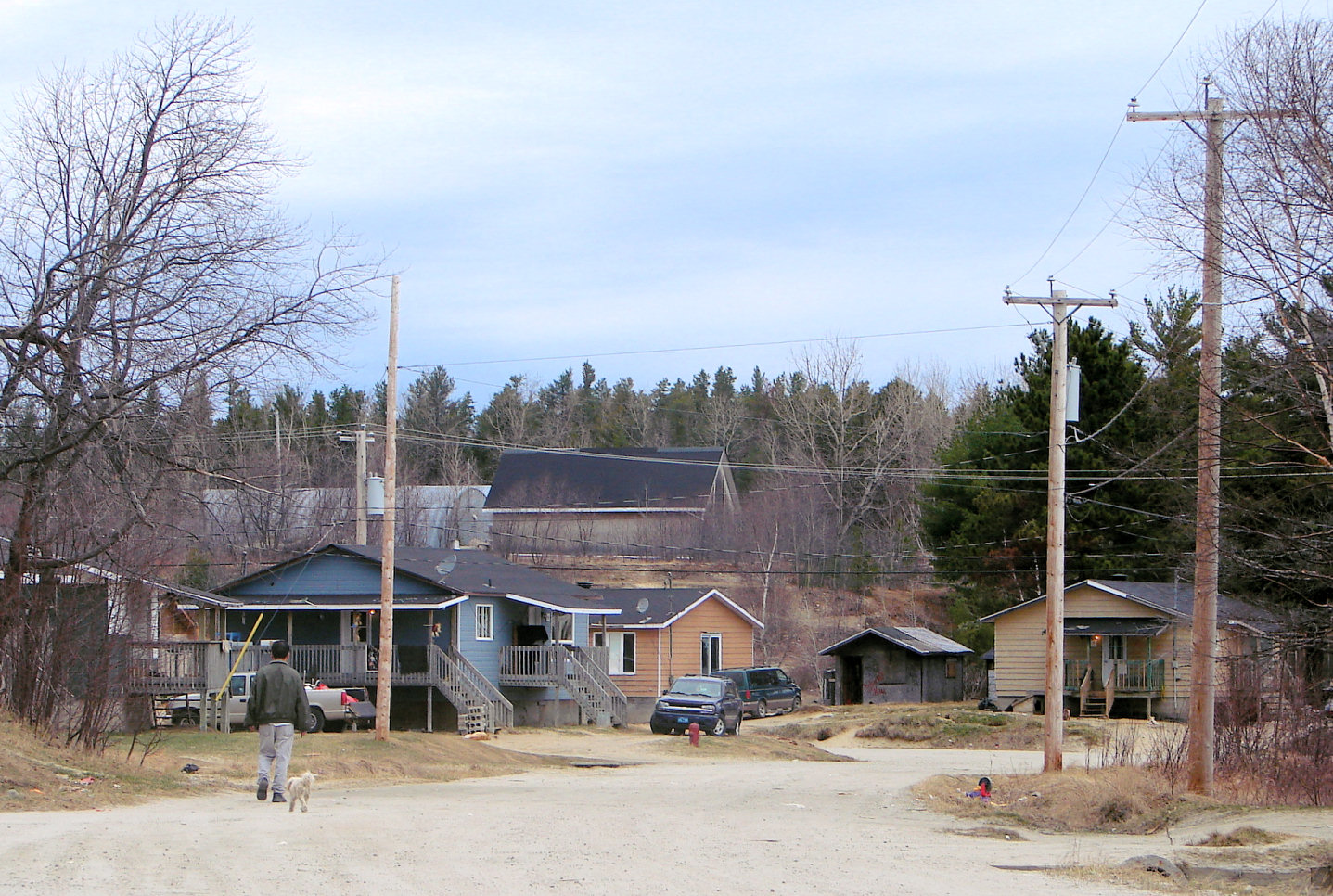
Rapid Lake Indian reserve

The Algonquins of Barriere Lake (Mitchikanibikok Inikare) an Algonquin First Nation in Quebec, Canada. They primarily live on the Indian reserve of Rapid Lake in Outaouais. In 2017 the band had a registered population of 792 members. It is part of Algonquin Nation Programs and Services Secretariat.

== Geography ==
Algonquins of Barriere Lake live primarily on the Indian reserve of Rapid Lake, also called Lac-Rapide and Kitiganik, located 121 km northwest of Maniwaki in Outaouais, Quebec. The closest important cities are Val-d'Or and Rouyn-Noranda. The surrounding land was and is used for natural resource extraction such as lumber and coal.

== Government ==
The members of the First Nation of Barriere Lake are Algonquin people. In March 2017 the band had a total registered population of 792 members, 166 of whom lived off reserve. Algonquins of Barriere Lake are governed by a band council elected according to the Section 11 of the Indian Act. For the 2016-2018 tenure, this council is composed of the chief Casey Ratt and six councilors. The band is affiliated with the tribal council Algonquin Nation Programs and Services Secretariat.

== History ==
The Algonquins of Barriere Lake were involved in the local history of disputes headed by European settlements and erections of forts. Additionally, the settlement of Quebec in the 1800s would extract resources from the Barriere Lake area to sell to the United States of America and Great Britain. In 2011 there was a dispute between local Quebecois government and the leadership of the Algonquins of Barriere Lake over local resource extraction. At the time the Quebec Ministers were trying to approve resource gathering efforts like logging and mining on the Algonquin land. However, the Mitchikanibikok Inik Elders Council informed the Ministers that according to section 7 of the Barriere Lake Trilateral Agreement, they must first consult with Algonquin leadership before carrying out actions on their people’s land. However the Trilateral Agreement was never truly respected by the government even though documents were mutually signed, and riot police were used to combat protestors protesting the Quebec government in 2008.

== See also ==
- Rapid Lake, Quebec
- Algonquin people
