= Barriere Lake Trilateral Agreement =

1991 Canadian treaty

The Barriere Lake Trilateral Agreement is a resource co-management framework covering 1 million hectares of traditional Algonquin territory in Northern Quebec. It was signed August 22, 1991 by the Algonquins of Barriere Lake, The Government of Quebec, and the Government of Canada. The agreement set out four years to conduct a comprehensive evaluation of the forestry and wildlife resources in the region and draft and implement a long-term integrated co-management plan between the Algonquin community and the Government of Quebec. It is considered significant in that it presented a model example of indigenous co-management and an alternative to comprehensive land claims policies based on extinguishing title. It was commended by the United Nations as a trailblazer of indigenous-state partnership and sustainable development. The principles of the Trilateral agreement have been upheld as a promising example of indigenous sovereignty and reconciliation for other projects across Canada

== History ==
In Fall of 1988 the Algonquins of Barriere Lake sent a delegation to Ottawa to request an audience with the Federal Government to protest widespread clear cut logging in their traditional territories and propose a resource co-management framework. In fall of 1989 the Algonquins blocked multiple logging access roads with barricades and encampments. On August 20 of 1990, and in the context of the ongoing Oka Crisis and many indigenous blockades in solidarity with the Mohawk people, they began a blockade of a highway connecting the region of Abitibi to Southern Quebec. John Ciaccia, then minister of Native Affairs, flew in to negotiate with the community, and proposed a tentative agreement with the Canadian Cabinet which was finalized on August 22, 1991, as the Trilateral Agreement.

== Contents ==
The Trilateral agreement was made between three parties: the Algonquins of Barriere Lake as represented by then chief Mr. Jean-Maurice Matchewan; The Government of Quebec, represented by the 4 respective ministers of Native Affairs, Canadian Intergovernmental Affairs, Forests, and Recreation, Hunting and Fishing; and the Government of Canada, represented by Monique Landry, Minister of State for Indian Affairs and Northern Development. The agreement laid out 3 phases: The collection and analysis of data related to renewable resources in the territory and their traditional use; The creation of a draft integrated resource management plan; And the implementation of that plan into regulation, law, and administration. Phase one was carried out creating comprehensive maps of the area, and individual and joint interviews with harvesters and elders, and extensive data collection of traditional identification, uses, life cycles, and harvesting methods of forestry and wildlife resources. The second phase included a sensitive area study, 2 year harvest study report, and elaboration of local traditional ecological knowledge be used in the integrated management plan. The project was repeatedly delayed during the 3rd phase and never reached completion.

== Controversy ==
Although all three phases were set out in the agreement to be completed May 26, 1995, the deadlines were extended until the project funding was ended by the Federal government in 2001. Problems cited by the Algonquins were a lack of adequate acknowledgment of their authority as collaborators, as well as logging permits being issued and clear-cutting continuing during the evaluation period. They pointed to a lack of good faith on the part of the Quebec government. In August 1992 Justice Rejean Paul brought in to mediate said the Quebec Ministry of Forests dealings during the course of the project "does not respect the Trilateral Agreement, either in the spirit, or the letter of the agreement". They also struggled with financing the evaluation period, although the federal government had agreed to cover the costs they were mandated to pay the costs in advance and be reimbursed after providing receipts. The federal government cited issues of going over-budget with a lack of results, and continued delays in the project deadlines. The 1991 Trilateral Agreement was considered by Justice Paul comparable to a treaty and the failure of the Quebec and Canadian governments to uphold the agreement has been cited by The Barriere Lake community in its ongoing opposition to mining and logging operations on its unceded traditional territories. This ongoing opposition in the context of the historical Trilateral Agreement was the subject of the 2013 documentary 'Honour Your Word' by director Martha Stiegman
