= CANADA! =

- Leader: Tony Kondaks
- Founder: Tony Kondaks
- Founded: 1994
- Dissolved: 1998
- Ideology: Partition of Quebec
- Colours: Red

The CANADA! Party was an official political party in the province of Quebec from 1994 to 1998. It was founded on Canada Day 1994 by federalist Tony Kondaks, former top-aide to Equality Party leader Robert Libman.

It was initially called the Canada Party of Quebec/Parti Canada du Québec but due to confusion with the federal Canada Party, it changed its name to CANADA! (with all capital letters and an exclamation point a few weeks later).

With Jacques Parizeau's Parti Québécois rising and the imminence of a referendum on Quebec's independence, the main platform of the CANADA! Party was to guarantee that any riding that elected one of its candidates would stay in Canada even if Quebec voted in favour of sovereignty in the 1995 referendum.

Kondaks had trouble with the Chief Electoral Officer of Quebec because he used a 1-900 phone line to finance his party's activities with money from other provinces. Justice Roland Tremblay forbade Kondaks to use this tactic in July 1994, saying it violated Quebec's electoral law.

The CANADA! Party ran 10 candidates and gathered 2,567 votes (0.07% of all votes cast) in the 1994 provincial election and lost its official status for not running any candidate in the 1998 provincial election. Kondaks has since moved to the United States and now lives in Mesa, Arizona, but keeps in touch with Canadian politics by sending regular letters to the editor to Montreal's English-language daily newspaper The Gazette.

== See also ==
- Equality Party
- Political parties in Quebec
- List of Quebec general elections
- National Assembly of Quebec
- Politics of Quebec
- Timeline of Quebec history
