= 32nd Quebec Legislature =

The 32nd National Assembly of Quebec was the provincial legislature in Quebec, Canada that was elected in the 1981 Quebec general election. It sat for a total of five sessions from May 19, 1981, to June 18, 1981; from September 30, 1981, to October 2, 1981; from November 9, 1981, to March 10, 1983; from March 23, 1983, to June 20, 1984; and from October 16, 1984, to October 10, 1985. The Parti Québécois government was led by Premier René Lévesque for most of the mandate, and by Pierre-Marc Johnson for a few months prior to the 1985 election. The Liberal opposition was led by Claude Ryan, by interim Liberal leader Gérard D. Levesque, and then by Robert Bourassa.

== Seats per political party ==
- After the 1981 elections

Affiliation	Members
Parti Québécois	80
Parti libéral du Québec	42
Total	122
Government Majority	38

== Member list ==
This was the list of members of the National Assembly of Quebec that were elected in the 1981 election:

Name	Party	Riding	First elected / previously elected	No. of terms
Jean-Paul Bordeleau	Parti Québécois	Abitibi-Est	1976	2nd term
François Gendron	Parti Québécois	Abitibi-Ouest	1976	2nd term
Pierre-Marc Johnson	Parti Québécois	Anjou	1976	2nd term
Claude Ryan	Libéral	Argenteuil	1979	2nd term
Jacques Baril	Parti Québécois	Arthabaska	1976	2nd term
Adrien Ouellette	Parti Québécois	Beauce-Nord	1976	2nd term
Hermann Mathieu	Libéral	Beauce-Sud	1979	2nd term
Laurent Lavigne	Parti Québécois	Beauharnois	1976	2nd term
Claude Lachance	Parti Québécois	Bellechasse	1981	1st term
Albert Houde	Libéral	Berthier	1981	1st term
Denis Lazure	Parti Québécois	Bertrand	1976	2nd term
Robert Bourassa (1985)	Libéral	Bertrand	1966, (Note: Mercier) 1985	4th term*
Gérard D. Levesque	Libéral	Bonaventure	1956	8th term
Patrice Laplante	Parti Québécois	Bourassa	1976	2nd term
Camille Laurin	Parti Québécois	Bourget	1970, 1976	3rd term*
Claude Trudel (1985)	Libéral	Bourget	1985	1st term
Pierre Paradis	Libéral	Brome-Missisquoi	1980	2nd term
Luc Tremblay	Parti Québécois	Chambly	1981	1st term
Marcel Gagnon	Parti Québécois	Champlain	1976	2nd term
John J. Kehoe	Libéral	Chapleau	1981	1st term
Denis de Belleval	Parti Québécois	Charlesbourg	1976	2nd term
Marc-Yvan Côté (1983)	Libéral	Charlesbourg	1973, (Note: Matane) 1983	2nd term*
Raymond Mailloux	Libéral	Charlevoix	1962	6th term
Roland Dussault	Parti Québécois	Châteauguay	1976	2nd term
Raymond Brouillet	Parti Québécois	Chauveau	1981	1st term
Marc-André Bédard	Parti Québécois	Chicoutimi	1973	3rd term
Lise Bacon	Libéral	Chomedey	1973, (Note: Bourassa) 1981	2nd term*
Guy Tardif	Parti Québécois	Crémazie	1976	2nd term
Herbert Marx	Libéral	D'Arcy-McGee	1979	2nd term
Pierre de Bellefeuille	Parti Québécois	Deux-Montagnes	1976	2nd term
Pierre de Bellefeuille	Independent	Deux-Montagnes	1976	2nd term
Pierre de Bellefeuille	Parti Indépendantiste	Deux-Montagnes	1976	2nd term
Huguette Lachapelle	Parti Québécois	Dorion	1981	1st term
Michel Clair	Parti Québécois	Drummond	1976	2nd term
Hubert Desbiens	Parti Québécois	Dubuc	1976	2nd term
Denis Perron	Parti Québécois	Duplessis	1976	2nd term
Michel Leduc	Parti Québécois	Fabre	1981	1st term
Gilles Grégoire	Parti Québécois	Frontenac	1976	2nd term
Gilles Grégoire	Independent	Frontenac	1976	2nd term
Henri Le May	Parti Québécois	Gaspé	1981	1st term
Michel Gratton	Libéral	Gatineau	1972	4th term
Jacques Rochefort	Parti Québécois	Gouin	1981	1st term
Elie Fallu	Parti Québécois	Groulx	1976	2nd term
Gilles Rocheleau	Libéral	Hull	1981	1st term
Claude Dubois	Libéral (Note: First elected as a Union Nationale)	Huntingdon	1976	2nd term
Jacques Beauséjour	Parti Québécois	Iberville	1976	2nd term
Denise Leblanc	Parti Québécois	Îles-de-la-Madeleine	1976	2nd term
Denise Leblanc	Independent	Îles-de-la-Madeleine	1976	2nd term
Joan Dougherty	Libéral	Jacques-Cartier	1981	1st term
Michel Bissonnet	Libéral	Jeanne-Mance	1981	1st term
Jean-Claude Rivest	Libéral	Jean-Talon	1979	2nd term
Carmen Juneau	Parti Québécois	Johnson	1981	1st term
Guy Chevrette	Parti Québécois	Joliette	1976	2nd term
Claude Vaillancourt	Parti Québécois	Jonquière	1976	2nd term
Aline Saint-Amand (1983)	Libéral	Jonquière	1983	1st term
Léonard Lévesque	Parti Québécois	Kamouraska-Témiscouata	1976	2nd term
Jacques Léonard	Parti Québécois	Labelle	1976	2nd term
Jacques Léonard	Independent	Labelle	1976	2nd term
Thérèse Lavoie-Roux	Libéral	L'Acadie	1976	2nd term
Jacques Brassard	Parti Québécois	Lac-Saint-Jean	1976	2nd term
Marcel Léger	Parti Québécois	LaFontaine	1970	4th term
Pauline Marois	Parti Québécois	La Peltrie	1981	1st term
André Bourbeau	Libéral	Laporte	1981	1st term
Jean-Pierre Saintonge	Libéral	La Prairie	1981	1st term
Jacques Parizeau	Parti Québécois	L'Assomption	1976	2nd term
Jean-Guy Gervais (1985)	Libéral	L'Assomption	1985	1st term
Christos Sirros	Libéral	Laurier	1981	1st term
Bernard Landry	Parti Québécois	Laval-des-Rapides	1976	2nd term
Jean-Pierre Jolivet	Parti Québécois	Laviolette	1976	2nd term
Jean Garon	Parti Québécois	Lévis	1976	2nd term
Raymond Gravel	Parti Québécois	Limoilou	1976	2nd term
Rodrigue Biron	Parti Québécois	Lotbinière	1976	2nd term
Claude Morin	Parti Québécois	Louis-Hébert	1976	2nd term
Réjean Doyon (1982)	Libéral	Louis-Hébert	1982	1st term
Louise Harel	Parti Québécois	Maisonneuve	1981	1st term
Fernand Lalonde	Libéral	Marguerite-Bourgeoys	1973	3rd term
Gilles Fortin (1984)	Libéral	Marguerite-Bourgeoys	1984	1st term
Pierre Marois	Parti Québécois	Marie-Victorin	1976	2nd term
Guy Pratt (1984)	Libéral	Marie-Victorin	1984	1st term
Claude Dauphin	Libéral	Marquette	1981	1st term
Yvon Picotte	Libéral	Maskinongé	1973	3rd term
Yves Bérubé	Parti Québécois	Matane	1976	2nd term
Léopold Marquis	Parti Québécois	Matapédia	1976	2nd term
Fabien Bélanger	Libéral	Mégantic-Compton	1980	2nd term
Madeleine Bélanger (1983)	Libéral	Mégantic-Compton	1983	1st term
Gérald Godin	Parti Québécois	Mercier	1976	2nd term
Jean-Paul Champagne	Parti Québécois	Mille-Îles	1981	1st term
Jacques LeBlanc	Parti Québécois	Montmagny-L'Islet	1981	1st term
Clément Richard	Parti Québécois	Montmorency	1976	2nd term
John Ciaccia	Libéral	Mont-Royal	1973	3rd term
Clifford Lincoln	Libéral	Nelligan	1981	1st term
Yves Beaumier	Parti Québécois	Nicolet	1981	1st term
Reed Scowen	Libéral	Notre-Dame-de-Grâce	1978	2nd term
Georges Vaillancourt	Libéral	Orford	1960	7th term
Pierre Fortier	Libéral	Outremont	1980	2nd term
Mark Assad	Libéral	Papineau	1970, 1981	3rd term*
Robert Middlemiss	Libéral	Pontiac	1981	1st term
Michel Pagé	Libéral	Portneuf	1973	3rd term
Robert Dean	Parti Québécois	Prévost	1981	1st term
Maurice Martel	Parti Québécois	Richelieu	1966, 1976	3rd term*
Yvon Vallières	Libéral	Richmond	1973, 1981	2nd term*
Alain Marcoux	Parti Québécois	Rimouski	1976	2nd term
Jules Boucher	Parti Québécois	Rivière-du-Loup	1976	2nd term
Jules Boucher	Independent	Rivière-du-Loup	1976	2nd term
John O'Gallagher	Libéral	Robert-Baldwin	1976	2nd term
Michel Gauthier	Parti Québécois	Roberval	1981	1st term
Gilbert Paquette	Parti Québécois	Rosemont	1976	2nd term
Gilbert Paquette	Independent	Rosemont	1976	2nd term
René Blouin	Parti Québécois	Rousseau	1981	1st term
Gilles Baril	Parti Québécois	Rouyn-Noranda–Témiscamingue	1981	1st term
Lucien Lessard	Parti Québécois	Saguenay	1970	4th term
Ghislain Maltais (1983)	Libéral	Saguenay	1983	1st term
Maximilien Polak	Libéral	Saint-Anne	1981	1st term
Guy Bisaillon	Parti Québécois	Sainte-Marie	1976	2nd term
Guy Bisaillon	Independent	Sainte-Marie	1976	2nd term
Réal Rancourt	Parti Québécois	Saint-François	1976	2nd term
Roma Hains	Libéral	Saint-Henri	1981	1st term
Maurice Dupré	Parti Québécois	Saint-Hyacinthe	1981	1st term
Claude Charron	Parti Québécois	Saint-Jacques	1970	4th term
Serge Champagne (1983)	Libéral	Saint-Jacques	1983	1st term
Jean-François Viau (1984)	Libéral	Saint-Jacques	1984	1st term
Jérôme Proulx	Parti Québécois	Saint-Jean	1966, 1976	3rd term*
Jérôme Proulx	Independent	Saint-Jean	1966, 1976	3rd term*
Jérôme Proulx	Parti Québécois	Saint-Jean	1966, 1976	3rd term*
Claude Forget	Libéral	Saint-Laurent	1973	3rd term
Germain Leduc (1982)	Libéral	Saint-Laurent	1982	1st term
Harry Blank	Libéral	Saint-Louis	1960	7th term
Yves Duhaime	Parti Québécois	Saint-Maurice	1976	2nd term
Jacques-Yvan Morin	Parti Québécois	Sauvé	1973	3rd term
Marcel Parent (1984)	Libéral	Sauvé	1984	1st term
Roger Paré	Parti Québécois	Shefford	1981	1st term
Raynald Fréchette	Parti Québécois	Sherbrooke	1966, 1981	2nd term*
René Lévesque	Parti Québécois	Taillon	1960, (Note: Montréal-Laurier (First elected as a Liberal)) 1976	5th term*
Richard Guay	Parti Québécois	Taschereau	1976	2nd term
Yves Blais	Parti Québécois	Terrebonne	1981	1st term
Denis Vaugeois	Parti Québécois	Trois-Rivières	1976	2nd term
Paul Philibert (1985)	Libéral	Trois-Rivières	1985	1st term
Marcel Lafrenière	Parti Québécois	Ungava	1981	1st term
David Payne	Parti Québécois	Vachon	1981	1st term
Jean-François Bertrand	Parti Québécois	Vanier	1976	2nd term
Daniel Johnson Jr.	Libéral	Vaudreuil-Soulanges	1981	1st term
Jean-Pierre Charbonneau	Parti Québécois	Verchères	1976	2nd term
Lucien Caron	Libéral	Verdun	1970	4th term
William Cusano	Libéral	Viau	1981	1st term
Cosmo Maciocia	Libéral	Viger	1981	1st term
Jean-Guy Rodrigue	Parti Québécois	Vimont	1981	1st term
Richard French	Libéral	Westmount	1981	1st term

== Other elected MNAs ==
Other MNAs were elected in by-elections during this mandate

- Réjean Doyon, Quebec Liberal Party, Louis-Hébert, April 5, 1982
- Germain Leduc, Quebec Liberal Party, Saint-Laurent, April 5, 1982
- Marc-Yvan Côté, Quebec Liberal Party, Charlesbourg, June 20, 1983
- Ghislain Maltais, Quebec Liberal Party, Saguenay, June 20, 1983
- Serge Champagne, Quebec Liberal Party, Saint-Jacques, June 20, 1983
- Aline Saint-Amand, Quebec Liberal Party, Jonquière, December 5, 1983
- Madeleine Bélanger, Quebec Liberal Party, Mégantic-Compton, December 5, 1983
- Gilles Fortin, Quebec Liberal Party, Marguerite-Bourgeoys, June 18, 1984
- Marcel Parent, Quebec Liberal Party, Sauvé, June 18, 1984
- Jean-François Viau, Quebec Liberal Party, Saint-Jacques, November 26, 1984
- Robert Bourassa, Quebec Liberal Party, Bertrand (Montérégie), June 3, 1985
- Claude Trudel, Quebec Liberal Party, Bourget, June 3, 1985
- Jean-Guy Gervais, Quebec Liberal Party, L'Assomption, June 3, 1985
- Paul Philibert, Quebec Liberal Party, Trois-Rivières, June 3, 1985

== Cabinet Ministers ==
=== Levesque Cabinet (1981-1985) ===
- Prime Minister and Executive Council President: René Lévesque
- Deputy Premier: Jacques-Yvan Morin (1981–1984), Camille Laurin (1984), Marc-André Bédard (1984–1985)
- Agriculture, Fisheries and Food: Jean Garon
- Labor, Workforce and Revenue Security: Raynald Fréchette (1981–1982)
  - Labor: Raynald Fréchette (1982–1985)
  - Workforce and Revenue Security: Pierre Marois (1982–1983), Pauline Marois (1983–1985)
- Employment: Robert Dean (1984–1985)
  - Public Works and Provisioning: Alain Marcoux (1981–1984)
- Administration: Yves Bérubé (1981–1982), Michel Clair (1984–1985)
  - Administration Reform: Yves Bérubé (1982–1984)
- Public Office: Denise Leblanc (1981–1984)
- Cultural Affairs: Clément Richard
- Cultural and Science Development: Jacques-Yvan Morin (1981–1982), Gerald Godin (1982)
- Cultural Communities and Immigration: Gérald Godin (1981–1984, 1984–1985), Louise Harel (1984), Pierre-Marc Johnson (1984)
- Social Affairs: Pierre-Marc Johnson (1981–1984), Camille Laurin (1984), Michel Clair (1984), Guy Chevrette (1984–1985)
  - Health and Social Services: Guy Chevrette (1985)
- Social Development: Denis Lazure (1981–1982)
- Family Policies: Yves Beaumier (1985)
- Status of Women : Pauline Marois (1981–1983, 1985), Denise Leblanc (1983–1984), René Lévesque (1984–1985), Francine Lalonde (1985)
- Language Affairs: Gérald Godin (1984)
- Education: Camille Laurin (1981–1984), Yves Bérubé (1984), François Gendron (1984)
- Science and Technology:Gilbert Paquette (1982–1984), Yves Bérubé (1984)
  - Superior Education in Science and Technology: Yves Bérubé (1984–1985)
- Recreation, Hunting and Fishing: Lucien Lessard (1981–1982), Guy Chevrette (1982–1984), Jacques Brassard (1984–1985)
- Transportation: Michel Clair (1981–1984), Jacques Léonard (1984), Guy Tardif (1984–1985)
- Communications: Jean-François Bertrand
- Relations with Citizens: Denis Lazure (1982–1984), Élie Fallu (1984–1985)
- Municipal Affairs:Jacques Léonard (1981–1984), Alain Marcoux (1984–1985)
- Environment: Marcel Léger (1981–1982), Adrien Ouellette (1982–1985)
- Energy and Resources: Yves Duhaime (1981–1984), Jean-Guy Rodrigue (1984)
  - Forests: Jean-Pierre Jolivet (1984–1985)
- Intergovernmental Affairs: Claude Morin (1981–1982), Jacques-Yvan Morin (1982–1984)
  - Canadian Intergovernmental Affairs: Pierre-Marc Johnson (1984–1985)
  - International Relations: Bernard Landry (1984–1985)
- Electoral reform: Marc-André Bedard
- Parliamentary Affairs: Claude Charron
- Industry, Commerce and Tourism: Rodrigue Biron (1981–1984)
  - Industry and Commerce: Rodrigue Biron (1984–1985)
  - Tourism: Marcel Léger (1984–1985)
- Planning: François Gendron (1981–1982)
  - Planning and Regional Development: François Gendron (1982–1984)
  - Development and Regional Roads: Henri Lemay (1984–1985)
- Housing and Consumer's Protection: Guy Tardif (1981–1984), Jacques Rochefort (1984–1985)
- Justice: Marc-André Bédard (1981–1984), Pierre-Marc Johnson (1984–1985)
- Finances: Jacques Parizeau (1981–1984), Yves Duhaime (1984–1985)
- President of the Treasury Board: Yves Bérubé (1981–1984), Michel Clair (1984–1985)
- Revenue: Raynald Fréchette (1981–1982), Alain Marcoux (1982–1984), Robert Dean (1984), Maurice Martel (1984–1985)
- Financial Institutions and Cooperatives: Jacques Parizeau (1981–1982)
- Economic Development: Bernard Landry (1981–1982)
- Foreign Trade:Bernard Landry (1982–1985)

=== Johnson Cabinet (1985) ===
- Prime Minister and Executive Council President: Pierre-Marc Johnson
- Deputy Premier: Marc-Andre Bédard
- Agriculture, Fisheries and Food: Jean Garon
- Labor: Raynald Fréchette
- Workforce and Revenue Security: Pauline Marois
- Employment: Robert Dean
- Administration: Michel Clair
- Cultural Affairs: Clement Richard (1985), Gerald Godin (1985)
- Cultural Communities and Immigration: Gérald Godin (1985), Élie Fallu (1985)
- Health and Social Services:Guy Chevrette
- Family Policies: Yves Beaumier
- Status of Women : Pauline Marois (1985), Lise Denis (1985)
- Education: Francois Gendron
- Superior Education in Science and Technology: Yves Bérubé (1985), Jean-Guy Rodrigue (1985)
- Recreation, Hunting and Fishing: Jacques Brassard
- Transportation: Guy Tardif (1985)
- Communications: Jean-François Bertrand
- Relations with Citizens: Elie Fallu (1985), Rollande Cloutier (1985)
- Municipal Affairs:Alain Marcoux
- Environment: Adrien Ouellette
- Energy and Resources: Jean-Guy Rodrigue (1985), Michel Clair (1985)
- Forests: Jean-Pierre Jolivet
- Canadian Intergovernmental Affairs: Pierre-Marc Johnson
- International Relations: Bernard Landry (1985), Louise Beaudoin (1985)
- Electoral reform: Marc-André Bédard
- Industry and Commerce: Rodrigue Biron
- Tourism: Marcel Leger
- Planning: Alain Marcoux
- Development and Regional Roads: Henri Lemay
- Housing and Consumer's Protection: Jacques Rochefort (1985)
- Justice: Raynald Fréchette
- Solicitor General: Marc-André Bédard
- Finances: Yves Duhaime (1985), Bernard Landry (1985)
- President of the Treasury Board: Michel Clair
- Revenue: Maurice Martel
- Foreign Trade: Bernard Landry (1985), Jean-Guy Parent (1985)

== New electoral districts ==
An electoral map reform was made in 1985 and implemented in the elections later that year.

- Maisonneuve was renamed Hochelaga-Maisonneuve.
- Nicolet was renamed Nicolet-Yamaska.
