= Jean Rochon =

Canadian politician (1938–2021)

MNA for Charlesbourg
- In office 1994–2003
- Preceded by: Marc-Yvan Côté
- Succeeded by: Éric Mercier

Personal details
- Born: July 29, 1938 Montreal, Quebec, Canada
- Died: October 16, 2021 (aged 83)
- Party: Parti Québécois
- Profession: Doctor

Jean Rochon (July 29, 1938 – October 16, 2021) was a Canadian politician and member of the National Assembly of Quebec. He was a cabinet minister for several ministries from 1994 to 2003 when the Parti Québécois formed the government under the leadership of Jacques Parizeau, Lucien Bouchard and Bernard Landry.

== Early life ==
Rochon was born in Montreal on July 29, 1938. His father, Albert, was employed as a longshoreman; his mother was Germaine (Laliberté). Rochon completed his secondary education at the Collège Sainte-Croix in his hometown. He graduated from the Université de Montréal with a Bachelor of Arts in 1958, before earning a law degree from the same institution three years later. He then obtained a medical degree from the Université Laval in 1966, before being awarded a masters and doctorate in public health from Harvard University.

== Career ==
Rochon first worked at the Université Laval Faculté de médecine starting in 1970. He established the Department of Social and Preventive Medicine there and served as its first director. He was also director of the Department of Community Health at the Centre hospitalier de l'Université Laval. He was later appointed dean of the faculty of medicine in 1979.

Rochon was the head of a major report on the state of health and social services in the provinces from 1985 to 1987, when the Liberals and then-Premier Robert Bourassa were in power. He tabled several proposals in order to reform the health care system. These included faster health care service by introducing what was called the "Virage ambulatoire" which saw the increase of home health care services and CLSC. Rochon entered politics in 1994, running in the provincial election that year as a candidate for the Parti Québécois. He was elected to the National Assembly, representing the district of Charlesbourg. He was then named Minister of Health on September 26, 1994.

As minister, Rochon adopted several of the aforementioned proposals from his report. However, the measures were criticized because they led to the closure of numerous hospitals and institutions across the province. In spite of protests and petitioning, the government went ahead with Rochon's plan, with the last hospital being shut in February 1997. He was also responsible for introducing legislation in 1998 to limit public smoking and reduce youth smoking. It was the first law to regulate smoking in public spaces.

After the 1998 elections, Rochon was named Minister of several other portfolios until his retirement in 2003. His seat was subsequently won by the Liberal candidate Éric Mercier, who defeated Jonatan Julien of the Action démocratique du Québec in the 2003 Quebec general election.

== Later life ==
After retiring as a professor in January 2003, Rochon continued to be involved in research and training projects at Laval. He died on October 16, 2021, after a short illness. He was 83 years old.
