= Gaudreault =

Gaudreault is a surname. Notable people with the name include:

- Armand Gaudreault (1921–2013), Canadian ice hockey player
- Laure Gaudreault (1889–1975), Canadian teacher, trade unionist and journalist
- Leo Gaudreault (1902–1950), Canadian ice hockey player
- Maryse Gaudreault (born 1959), Canadian politician
- Sylvain Gaudreault (born 1970), Canadian politician
