= Jonquière (provincial electoral district) =

Provincial electoral district in Quebec, Canada

Coordinates: 48.378°N 71.230°W

Quebec electoral district
- Location in Saguenay

Provincial electoral district
- Legislature: National Assembly of Quebec
MNA
Jimmy Bouchard
Parti Québécois
- District created: 1965
- First contested: 1966
- Last contested: 2026

Demographics
- Electors (2014): 45,648
- Area (km²): 409.3
- Census division: Le Saguenay-et-son-Fjord (part)
- Census subdivision: Saguenay (part)

Jonquière (French pronunciation: [ʒɔ̃kjɛʁ]) is a provincial electoral district in the Saguenay–Lac-Saint-Jean region of Quebec, Canada, that elects members to the National Assembly of Quebec. It is located within the city of Saguenay and consists of most of the borough of Jonquière.

It was created for the 1966 election from parts of Jonquière-Kénogami and Lac-Saint-Jean electoral districts.

In the change from the 2001 to the 2011 electoral map, it lost a small amount of territory to Dubuc.

== Members of the Legislative Assembly / National Assembly ==
Legislature	Years	Member	Party
Riding created from Jonquière-Kénogami and Lac-Saint-Jean
28th	1966–1970	Gérald Harvey	Liberal
29th	1970–1973	Gérald Harvey	Liberal
30th	1973–1976	Gérald Harvey	Liberal
31st	1976–1981	Claude Vaillancourt	Parti Québécois
32nd	1981–1983	Claude Vaillancourt	Parti Québécois
32nd	1983–1985	Aline Saint-Amand	Liberal
33rd	1985–1989	Francis Dufour	Parti Québécois
34th	1989–1994	Francis Dufour	Parti Québécois
35th	1994–1996	Francis Dufour	Parti Québécois
35th	1996–1998	Lucien Bouchard	Parti Québécois
36th	1998–2001	Lucien Bouchard	Parti Québécois
36th	2001–2003	Françoise Gauthier	Liberal
37th	2003–2007	Françoise Gauthier	Liberal
38th	2007–2008	Sylvain Gaudreault	Parti Québécois
39th	2008–2012	Sylvain Gaudreault	Parti Québécois
40th	2012–2014	Sylvain Gaudreault	Parti Québécois
41st	2014–2018	Sylvain Gaudreault	Parti Québécois
42nd	2018–2022	Sylvain Gaudreault	Parti Québécois
43rd	2022–2026	Yannick Gagnon	Coalition Avenir Québec
44th	2026–Present	Jimmy Bouchard	Parti Québécois

== Election results ==
2026 Quebec general election
** Preliminary results — Not yet official **
Party	Candidate	Votes	%	±%
Parti Québécois	Jimmy Bouchard	11,101	36.34	+17.04
Coalition Avenir Québec	Yannick Gagnon	10,185	33.34	–26.05
Conservative	Yannick Pelletier	5,244	17.16	+7.61
Québec solidaire	Serge Bergeron	2,223	7.28	–1.79
Liberal	Wilda Solon	1,639	5.36	+3.24
Climat Québec	Marc Lavoie	159	0.52	N/A
Total valid votes		30,551	98.48	–0.27
Total rejected ballots		470	1.52	+0.27
Turnout		31,021	68.32	–0.14
Electors on the lists		45,408		
Parti Québécois gain from Coalition Avenir Québec		Swing		+21.55
Source: Élections Québec

2022 Quebec general election
Party	Candidate	Votes	%	±%
Coalition Avenir Québec	Yannick Gagnon	18,196	59.39	+26.92
Parti Québécois	Caroline Dubé	5,912	19.30	–29.06
Conservative	Isabelle Champagne	2,926	9.55	+8.46
Québec solidaire	Karla Cynthia Garcia Martinez	2,778	9.07	+1.79
Liberal	Wilda Solon	648	2.12	–7.72
Parti nul	Line Bélanger	177	0.58	New
Total valid votes		30,637	98.75	
Total rejected ballots		387	1.25	–0.16
Turnout		31,024	68.46	–0.80
Electors on the lists		45,320		
Coalition Avenir Québec gain from Parti Québécois		Swing		+27.99
Source: Élections Québec

2018 Quebec general election
Party	Candidate	Votes	%	±%
Parti Québécois	Sylvain Gaudreault	14,887	48.35	+4.83
Coalition Avenir Québec	Benoit Rochefort	9,997	32.47	+8.86
Liberal	Alexandre Duguay	3,029	9.84	-16.79
Québec solidaire	Marcel Lapointe	2,242	7.28	+2.09
Conservative	Jimmy Voyer	337	1.09	
Green	Julie Sion	296	0.96	
Total valid votes		30,788	98.60	
Total rejected ballots		438	1.40	
Turnout		31,226	69.25	
Eligible voters		45,091		
Parti Québécois hold		Swing		-2.02
Source(s) "Rapport des résultats officiels du scrutin". Élections Québec.

2014 Quebec general election
Party	Candidate	Votes	%
Parti Québécois	Sylvain Gaudreault	13,487	43.52
Liberal	Tommy Pageau	8,254	26.63
Coalition Avenir Québec	Mélanie Boucher	7,318	23.61
Québec solidaire	Réjean Dumais	1,608	5.19
Option nationale	Nicolas Beaulieu	326	1.05
Total valid votes		30,993	97.67
Total rejected ballots		738	2.33
Turnout		31,731	69.51
Electors on the lists		45,648	–

2012 Quebec general election
Party	Candidate	Votes	%
Parti Québécois	Sylvain Gaudreault	16,429	48.22
Coalition Avenir Québec	Pierre-Olivier Simard	8,540	25.07
Liberal	Martine Girard	6,833	20.06
Québec solidaire	Réjean Dumais	1,089	3.20
Option nationale	Sébastien Lévesque	427	1.25
Parti nul	Alain Létourneau	269	0.79
Quebec Citizens' Union	Alexis St-Gelais	265	0.78
Independent	Tommy Gagnon	218	0.64
Total valid votes		34,070	98.80
Total rejected ballots		413	1.20
Turnout		34,483	76.13
Electors on the lists		45,294	–

2008 Quebec general election
Party	Candidate	Votes	%	±%
Parti Québécois	Sylvain Gaudreault	13,077	47.52	
Liberal	Martine Girard	10,367	37.67	
Action démocratique	Marc Jomphe	2,913	10.58	
Québec solidaire	Gabrielle Desbiens	1,164	4.23	

2007 Quebec general election
Party	Candidate	Votes	%
Parti Québécois	Sylvain Gaudreault	12,851	39.33
Liberal	Françoise Gauthier	11,576	35.43
Action démocratique	Marc Jomphe	6,634	20.30
Québec solidaire	Sylvain Bergeron	839	2.57
Green	Dominic Rouette	703	2.15
Independent	Pierre Laliberté	71	0.22
Total valid votes		32,674	99.17
Total rejected ballots		275	0.83
Turnout		32,949	74.87
Electors on the lists		44,011	–

2003 Quebec general election
Party	Candidate	Votes	%
Liberal	Françoise Gauthier	13,826	44.42
Parti Québécois	Myrtha Laflamme	11,386	36.58
Action démocratique	Réjean Laforest	5,216	16.76
Bloc Pot	Batiste W. Foisy	368	1.18
UFP	Michel Perron	330	1.06
Total valid votes		31,126	98.93
Total rejected ballots		337	1.07
Turnout		31,463	70.68
Electors on the lists		44,515	–

Quebec provincial by-election, 2001
Party	Candidate	Votes	%
Liberal	Françoise Gauthier	13,077	46.54
Parti Québécois	Nicole Racine	8,830	31.42
Action démocratique	Michèle Boulianne	5,391	19.18
RAP	Gilbert Talbot	480	1.71
Bloc Pot	Marc-Boris St-Maurice	323	1.15
Total valid votes		28,101	99.04
Total rejected ballots		273	0.96
Turnout		28,374	63.45
Electors on the lists		44,716	–

1998 Quebec general election
Party	Candidate	Votes	%
Parti Québécois	Lucien Bouchard	20,475	60.48
Liberal	Guylaine Caron	6,552	19.35
Independent RAP	Michel Chartrand	5,023	14.84
Action démocratique	Hélène Vigneault	1,686	4.98
Natural Law	Sylvain Bergeron	120	0.35
Total valid votes		33,856	99.12
Total rejected ballots		302	0.88
Turnout		34,158	76.91
Electors on the lists		44,415	–

Quebec provincial by-election, 1996
Party	Candidate	Votes	%
Parti Québécois	Lucien Bouchard	24,900	94.82
CANADA!	George Butcher	484	1.84
Natural Law	Normand Dufour	222	0.85
Independent	Stéphane Guy Maurice Gagnon	215	0.82
Independent	Claude Gagnon	198	0.75
Socialist Democracy	Gervais Tremblay	185	0.70
Independent	Jolly Taylor	57	0.22
Total valid votes		26,261	98.72
Total rejected ballots		341	1.28
Turnout		26,602	60.99
Electors on the lists		43,614	–

1995 Quebec referendum
Side	Votes	%
Oui	28,385	71.02
Non	11,584	28.98

1994 Quebec general election
Party	Candidate	Votes	%
Parti Québécois	Francis Dufour	22,598	69.64
Liberal	Stéphane Dallaire	8,703	26.74
Natural Law	Sylvie Francoeur	1,248	3.83
Total valid votes		32,549	97.01
Total rejected ballots		1,002	2.99
Turnout		33,551	80.03
Electors on the lists		41,921	–

1992 Charlottetown Accord referendum
Side	Votes	%
Non	27,001	77.31
Oui	7,926	22.69

1989 Quebec general election
Party	Candidate	Votes	%
Parti Québécois	Francis Dufour	17,294	56.05
Liberal	Aline St-Amand	11,789	38.21
New Democratic	Maurice Bilodeau	1,774	5.75
Total valid votes		30,857	97.63
Total rejected ballots		750	2.37
Turnout		31,607	76.16
Electors on the lists		41,502	–

1985 Quebec general election
Party	Candidate	Votes	%
Parti Québécois	Francis Dufour	17,741	52.51
Liberal	Aline St-Amand	14,130	41.82
New Democratic	Maurice Bilodeau	1,784	5.28
Christian Socialist	Jean-Pierre Rannou	132	0.39
Total valid votes		33,787	98.70
Total rejected ballots		444	1.30
Turnout		34,231	79.86
Electors on the lists		42,864	–

Quebec provincial by-election, 1983
Party	Candidate	Votes	%
Liberal	Aline St-Amand	16,338	52.09
Parti Québécois	Céline Gagnon	15,028	47.91
Total valid votes		31,366	97.66
Total rejected ballots		751	2.34
Turnout		32,117	75.17
Electors on the lists		42,725	–

1981 Quebec general election
Party	Candidate	Votes	%
Parti Québécois	Claude Vaillancourt	23,562	65.99
Liberal	André Harvey	11,327	31.72
Union Nationale	Jacques Trahan	582	1.63
Workers Communist	Edouard Lavallière	235	0.66
Total valid votes		35,706	99.06
Total rejected ballots		338	0.94
Turnout		36,044	83.63
Electors on the lists		43,099	–

1980 Quebec referendum
Side	Votes	%
Oui	22,058	60.74
Non	14,25	39.26

1976 Quebec general election
Party	Candidate	Votes	%
Parti Québécois	Claude Vaillancourt	20,373	58.23
Liberal	Gérald Harvey	10,682	31.04
Union Nationale	Roselda Duguay Brassard	2,220	6.34
Ralliement créditiste	Serge Racine	1,535	4.39
Total valid votes		34,990	98.31
Total rejected ballots		600	1.69
Turnout		35,590	89.26
Electors on the lists		39,873	–

1973 Quebec general election
Party	Candidate	Votes	%
Liberal	Gérald Harvey	16,985	53.71
Parti Québécois	Francis Dufour	12,850	40.63
Union Nationale	Lucien Audet	897	2.84
Parti créditiste	Albert Bouchard	892	2.82
Total valid votes		31,624	98.42
Total rejected ballots		507	1.58
Turnout		32,131	84.30
Electors on the lists		38,117	–

1970 Quebec general election
Party	Candidate	Votes	%
Liberal	Gérald Harvey	15,010	49.49
Parti Québécois	Gilles Grégoire	11,354	37.44
Union Nationale	Claude Boily	3,108	10.25
Ralliement créditiste	Gérard Lacombe	856	2.82
Total valid votes		30,328	99.06
Total rejected ballots		289	0.94
Turnout		30,617	88.64
Electors on the lists		34,540	–

1966 Quebec general election
Party	Candidate	Votes	%
Liberal	Gérald Harvey	11,959	46.91
Union Nationale	Roger Dufault	7,464	29.28
Ralliement national	Magella Tremblay	4,992	19.50
RIN	Gérard Lacombe	916	3.59
Independent Socialist	Richard Tremblay	165	0.65
Total valid votes		25,496	98.69
Total rejected ballots		339	1.31
Turnout		25,835	79.06
Electors on the lists		32,677	–

== See also ==
- List of Quebec provincial electoral districts
- Canadian provincial electoral districts
