= Francis Dufour =

Canadian politician (1929–2020)

Member of the National Assembly of Quebec for Jonquière
- In office December 2, 1985 – January 15, 1996
- Preceded by: Aline St-Amand
- Succeeded by: Lucien Bouchard

Personal details
- Born: March 28, 1929 Kénogami, Quebec, Canada
- Died: May 25, 2020 (aged 91) Jonquière, Quebec, Canada
- Party: Parti Québécois
- Profession: Politician

Francis Dufour (March 28, 1929 – May 25, 2020) was a Canadian Quebec politician. He served as the member for Jonquière in the National Assembly of Quebec as a member of the Parti Québécois from 1985 until 1996, when he relinquished his seat to allow Lucien Bouchard, the Premier of Quebec, a seat in the assembly.

== Biography ==
Dufour was a clerk at the Arvida Municipal Treasury in 1947. He worked for Alcan from 1948 to 1975, and served as the director of its employees' union from 1955 to 1963.

== Political career ==
Dufour was elected a councillor of Arvida from 1960 until 1964. He was elected mayor in 1967 and served in that position until 1975.

During that time Dufour ran in the 1973 Quebec election for the Parti Québécois in Jonquière and lost to incumbent Gérald Harvey.

When Arvida was amalgamated into Jonquière, he ran for and was elected to the position of its mayor. Dufour served as President of the Union of Quebec Municipalities from 1982 until 1984.

Dufour ran again for Jonquière in 1985 and won. He was re-elected in 1989 and 1994.

He served primarily as a backbencher during his time in the legislature. He resigned on January 15, 1996 to let Lucien Bouchard, Premier of Quebec have a seat in the legislature.

== Electoral record ==
=== Provincial ===
1994 Quebec general election
Party	Candidate	Votes	%
Parti Québécois	Francis Dufour	22,598	69.64
Liberal	Stéphane Dallaire	8,703	26.74
Natural Law	Sylvie Francoeur	1,248	3.83
Total valid votes		32,549	97.01
Total rejected ballots		1,002	2.99
33,551		80.03	
Electors on the lists		41,921	–

1989 Quebec general election
Party	Candidate	Votes	%
Parti Québécois	Francis Dufour	17,294	56.05
Liberal	Aline St-Amand	11,789	38.21
New Democratic	Maurice Bilodeau	1,774	5.75
Total valid votes		30,857	97.63
Total rejected ballots		750	2.37
31,607		76.16	
Electors on the lists		41,502	–

1985 Quebec general election
Party	Candidate	Votes	%
Parti Québécois	Francis Dufour	17,741	52.51
Liberal	Aline St-Amand	14,130	41.82
New Democratic	Maurice Bilodeau	1,784	5.28
Christian Socialist	Jean-Pierre Rannou	132	0.39
Total valid votes		33,787	98.70
Total rejected ballots		444	1.30
34,231		79.86	
Electors on the lists		42,864	–

1973 Quebec general election
Party	Candidate	Votes	%
Liberal	Gérald Harvey	16,985	53.71
Parti Québécois	Francis Dufour	12,850	40.63
Union Nationale	Lucien Audet	897	2.84
Parti créditiste	Albert Bouchard	892	2.82
Total valid votes		31,624	98.42
Total rejected ballots		507	1.58
32,131		84.30	
Electors on the lists		38,117	–
