= Jimmy Bouchard =

Quebec politician

Jimmy Bouchard MNA

Member of the National Assembly for Jonquière
- Incumbent
- Assumed office October 5, 2026
- Preceded by: Yannick Gagnon

Saguenay City Councillor for District 1 in the borough of Jonquière
- In office December 15, 2019 – November 2, 2025
- Preceded by: Jonathan Tremblay
- Succeeded by: Daniel Tremblay-Larouche

Personal details
- Party: Parti Québécois

Jimmy Bouchard is a Canadian politician who is a candidate for the National Assembly of Quebec for Jonquière in the 2026 Quebec general election as a member of the Parti Québécois.

Bouchard was a councillor in Saguenay from 2019 to 2025. He was also a teacher at the Cégep de Chicoutimi and a civil engineering technician.
