= Clément M. Côté =

Canadian politician (born 1940)

Clément M. Côté (19 October 1940 – February 21, 2026) was a Progressive Conservative party member of the House of Commons of Canada. Born in Saint-Cœur-de-Marie, Québec, he was a sales manager by career.

Côté was elected at the Lac-Saint-Jean electoral district in the 1984 federal election. He resigned part way through his term in the 33rd Canadian Parliament to permit Lucien Bouchard to enter federal politics.
