= Éric Mercier =

Canadian politician

Éric R. Mercier

MNA for Charlesbourg
- In office 2003–2007
- Preceded by: Jean Rochon
- Succeeded by: Catherine Morissette

Personal details
- Born: October 3, 1967 (age 59) Quebec City, Quebec
- Party: Quebec Liberal Party (provincial); Québec 21 (municipal); Respect Citoyens (municipal)
- Profession: Lawyer

Éric R. Mercier (born October 3, 1967) is a military officer, publicist, and politician from Quebec. As a member of the Quebec Liberal Party, Mercier represented the Charlesbourg electoral district in the National Assembly of Quebec from 2003 to 2007.

== Life and career ==
His father Ralph Mercier (1937–2020) was also a politician from Quebec. Mercier attended Campus Notre-Dame-de-Foy in Saint-Augustin-de-Desmaures, graduating in 1987. He then attended Université Laval, earning a bachelor's degree in communications and public relations in 1991 and a bachelor's degree in political science in 1996. He also took courses in the law school while attending Laval. He earned a degree in tourism at Collège Mérici in 1994. Mercier was appointed project manager for the public relations group at the Mallette Maheu division of Arthur Andersen in 1996.

Mercier then took military training courses for officers and leadership at Royal Military College Saint-Jean, completing the work in 1998. After naval training in Victoria, British Columbia, he studied information and public affairs for the Canadian Forces in Victoria until 2001. He was appointed as a career officer of the Royal Canadian Navy in 1998, training on HMCS Oriole in 1998 and the frigate HMCS Ottawa in 1999 and 2000. He served as liaison officer and administrative assistant at the Canadian Forces Naval Reserve in 1999 and 2000, then as public communications officer attached to the headquarters of the Naval Reserve in 2000 and 2001. Mercier was Divisional Officer at Department of Education at the Naval Unit HMCS Montcalm in Quebec in 2002 and 2003. He served as Deputy Director and Director of Communications Office of the Leader of the Official Opposition in Quebec City in 2002 and 2003.

He was elected in the 2003 Quebec general election, succeeding the retiring Jean Rochon of Parti Québécois. Mercier was defeated by Catherine Morissette of Action Démocratique du Québec in the 2007 Quebec general election.
