= Michel Pigeon =

Canadian politician

MNA for Charlesbourg
- In office 2008–2012
- Preceded by: Catherine Morissette
- Succeeded by: Denise Trudel

Personal details
- Born: Quebec City, Quebec, Canada
- Party: Liberal
- Education: Laval University; Imperial College of Science and Technology

Michel Pigeon (born 1945) is a Canadian politician. Pigeon was elected to represent the riding of Charlesbourg in the National Assembly of Quebec in the 2008 provincial election. He is a member of the Quebec Liberal Party.

Pigeon received a bachelor's degree in civil engineering from the Laval University. He also made studies at the Imperial College of Science and Technology in London, England. He later worked as an engineer until 1972 where he worked as a professor in the Department of Engineering at Laval, specialized in concrete structures. From 2002 to 2007, he was also rector for the university.

Pigeon defeated the ADQ's Catherine Morissette in Charlesbourg in the 2008 elections.
