= Denise Trudel =

Canadian politician (born 1955)

Member of the National Assembly of Quebec for Charlesbourg
- In office September 4, 2012 – April 7, 2014
- Preceded by: Michel Pigeon
- Succeeded by: François Blais

Quebec City Councillor for Saint-Rodrigue District
- In office 2005–2012

Personal details
- Born: August 27, 1955 (age 71) Alma, Quebec, Canada
- Party: Coalition Avenir Québec
- Education: Cégep de Sainte-Foy, 1974; Institut de stratégies de communication du Québec, 1996

Denise Trudel (French pronunciation: [dəniz tʁydɛl]; born August 27, 1955) is a Canadian politician. She was a Coalition Avenir Québec (CAQ) member of the National Assembly of Quebec for the Capitale-Nationale region Charlesbourg riding from 2012 to 2014, elected in the 2012 election. He ran in Roberval in 2018, losing to premier Philippe Couillard.

Prior to her election to the provincial legislature, Trudel served on the Quebec City Council from 2005 to 2012.

== Personal ==
Trudel is the daughter of former Quebec City Councillor Gilles Trudel.
