= Charlesbourg (provincial electoral district) =

Provincial electoral district in Quebec, Canada

Coordinates: 46°52′N 71°16′W

Quebec electoral district
- Location in Quebec

Provincial electoral district
- Legislature: National Assembly of Quebec
MNA
Éloïse Coulombe
Conservative
- District created: 1972
- First contested: 1973
- Last contested: 2026

Demographics
- Population (2006): 62,269
- Electors (2012): 52,421
- Area (km²): 30.6
- Pop. density (per km²): 2,034.9
- Census division: Quebec City (part)
- Census subdivision: Quebec City (part)

Charlesbourg is a provincial electoral district in the Capitale-Nationale region of Quebec, Canada, that elects members to the National Assembly of Quebec. It consists of part of the Charlesbourg borough of Quebec City.

It was created for the 1973 election from parts of Chauveau and Montmorency electoral districts.

In the change from the 2001 to the 2011 electoral map, it lost very small amounts of territory to Jean-Lesage and Montmorency electoral districts.

In the change from the 2011 to the 2018 electoral map, the riding will gain some territory (roughly the area between Rivère des Roches to Rue George-Muir) from Chauveau.

== Members of the National Assembly ==
Legislature	Years	Member	Party
Riding created from Chauveau and Montmorency
30th	1973–1976	André Harvey	Liberal
31st	1976–1981	Denis de Belleval	Parti Québécois
32nd	1981–1982	Denis de Belleval	Parti Québécois
32nd	1983–1985	Marc-Yvan Côté	Liberal
33rd	1985–1989	Marc-Yvan Côté	Liberal
34th	1989–1994	Marc-Yvan Côté	Liberal
35th	1994–1998	Jean Rochon	Parti Québécois
36th	1998–2003	Jean Rochon	Parti Québécois
37th	2003–2007	Éric Mercier	Liberal
38th	2007–2008	Catherine Morissette	Action démocratique
39th	2008–2012	Michel Pigeon	Liberal
40th	2012–2014	Denise Trudel	Coalition Avenir Québec
41st	2014–2018	François Blais	Liberal
42nd	2018–2022	Jonatan Julien	Coalition Avenir Québec
43rd	2022–2026	Jonatan Julien	Coalition Avenir Québec
44th	2026–Present	Éloïse Coulombe	Conservative

== Election results ==
2026 Quebec general election
** Preliminary results — Not yet official **
Party	Candidate	Votes	%	±%
Conservative	Éloïse Coulombe	16,882	38.49	+18.12
Parti Québécois	Gabriel Coulombe	11,337	25.85	+11.66
Liberal	Saynabou Top	5,956	13.58	+7.59
Coalition Avenir Québec	Marie-Josée Morency	5,171	11.79	–33.21
Québec solidaire	Georges Goma	4,114	9.38	–3.67
Parti nul	Amelia Alexandrescu	320	0.73	N/A
Parti accès propriété et équité	Leopold Toko Simo	85	0.19	N/A
Total valid votes		43,865	98.76	+0.10
Total rejected ballots		549	1.24	–0.10
Turnout		44,414	76.91	+2.31
Electors on the lists		57,745		
Conservative gain from Coalition Avenir Québec		Swing		+3.23
Source: Élections Québec

2022 Quebec general election
Party	Candidate	Votes	%	±%
Coalition Avenir Québec	Jonatan Julien	18,921	45.00	–3.13
Conservative	Jean Domingue	8,564	20.37	+16.69
Parti Québécois	Priscilla Corbeil	5,967	14.19	+2.47
Québec solidaire	Ève Duhaime	5,486	13.05	–0.47
Liberal	Mahamadou Sissoko	2,518	5.99	–16.45
Green	Odevie Essaidi	348	0.83	New
Parti 51	David Cantin	163	0.39	New
Démocratie directe	Daniel Pelletier	75	0.18	New
Total valid votes		42,042	98.66	
Total rejected ballots		570	1.34	–0.60
Turnout		42,612	74.60	+1.23
Electors on the lists		57,117		
Coalition Avenir Québec hold		Swing		–9.91
Source: Élections Québec

2018 Quebec general election
Party	Candidate	Votes	%	±%
Coalition Avenir Québec	Jonatan Julien	19,985	48.13	+15.70
Liberal	François Blais	9,319	22.44	-19.63
Québec solidaire	Élisabeth Germain	5,613	13.52	+8.71
Parti Québécois	Annie Morin	4,868	11.72	-6.20
Conservative	Valérie Tremblay	1,530	3.68	+2.57
Équipe Autonomiste	Daniel Pelletier	212	0.51	
Total valid votes		41,527	98.06	
Total rejected ballots		821	1.94	
Turnout		42,348	73.37	
Eligible voters		57,722		
Coalition Avenir Québec gain from Liberal		Swing		+17.67
Source(s) "Rapport des résultats officiels du scrutin". Élections Québec.

2014 Quebec general election
Party	Candidate	Votes	%	±%
Liberal	François Blais	16,934	42.07	+7.90
Coalition Avenir Québec	Denise Trudel	13,053	32.43	-4.46
Parti Québécois	Dominique Payette	7,215	17.92	-3.23
Québec solidaire	Marie Céline Domingue	1,936	4.81	+0.92
Conservative	Milan Jovanovic	450	1.12	
Parti nul	Sylvain Fiset	315	0.78	-0.03
Option nationale	Guillaume Cyr	257	0.64	-1.24
Unité Nationale	Daniel Lachance	52	0.13	-0.14
Marxist–Leninist	Normand Fournier	40	0.10	-0.03
Total valid votes		40,252	98.94	
Total rejected ballots		431	1.06	-0.15
Turnout		40,683	76.94	-2.97
Electors on the lists		52,879	–	
Liberal gain from Coalition Avenir Québec		Swing		+6.18

2012 Quebec general election
Party	Candidate	Votes	%
Coalition Avenir Québec	Denise Trudel	15,278	36.89
Liberal	Michel Pigeon	14,153	34.17
Parti Québécois	Christoph Fortier Guay	8,760	21.15
Québec solidaire	Marie Céline Domingue	1,612	3.89
Option nationale	Guillaume Cyr	780	1.88
Parti nul	Jérôme Paquin	336	0.81
Independent	Alain Pérusse	232	0.56
Unité Nationale	Daniel Lachance	112	0.27
Équipe Autonomiste	Yves Marier	102	0.25
Marxist–Leninist	Pierre Chénier	53	0.13
Total valid votes		41,418	98.79
Total rejected ballots		506	1.21
Turnout		41,924	79.91
Electors on the lists		52,467	–

2008 Quebec general election
Party	Candidate	Votes	%	±%
Liberal	Michel Pigeon	14,196	42.36	
Action démocratique	Catherine Morissette	9,814	29.29	
Parti Québécois	Renaud Lapierre	8,449	25.21	
Québec solidaire	Martine Sanfaçon	1,053	3.14	
Total valid votes		33,512	98.70	
Total rejected ballots		443	1.30	
Turnout		33,955	65.79	
Electors on the lists		51,615	–	

2007 Quebec general election
Party	Candidate	Votes	%	±%
Action démocratique	Catherine Morissette	17,207	43.36	
Liberal	Éric R. Mercier	10,843	27.32	
Parti Québécois	Richard Marceau	9,828	24.77	
Green	Rama Borne MacDonald	968	2.44	–
Québec solidaire	Réjean Dumais	837	2.11	

2003 Quebec general election
Party	Candidate	Votes	%
Liberal	Éric Mercier	17,169	44.46
Action démocratique	Jonatan Julien	10,936	28.32
Parti Québécois	Sylvie Tremblay	9,741	25.23
Green	Yonnel Bonaventure	438	1.13
UFP	Simon Carreau	329	0.85
Total valid votes		38,613	99.21
Total rejected ballots		308	0.79
Turnout		38,921	79.06
Electors on the lists		49,229	–

1998 Quebec general election
Party	Candidate	Votes	%
Parti Québécois	Jean Rochon	15,985	41.00
Liberal	Denis Roy	15,952	40.92
Action démocratique	Stephan Asselin	6,309	16.18
Independent	Jean-Marie Fiset	296	0.76
Socialist Democracy	Jean-Pierre Duchesneau	273	0.70
Natural Law	Wadi Bounouar	170	0.44
Total valid votes		38,613	99.21
Total rejected ballots		308	0.79
Turnout		38,921	79.06
Electors on the lists		49,229	–

1995 Quebec referendum
Side	Votes	%
Oui	23,343	53.20
Non	20,535	46.80

1994 Quebec general election
Party	Candidate	Votes	%
Parti Québécois	Jean Rochon	17,908	47.01
Liberal	Robert Gingras	10,413	27.34
Action démocratique	André Fournier	6,022	15.81
New Democratic	Alain Brasset	811	2.13
Independent	Mario Bellavance	804	2.11
Independent	Johanne Horth	561	1.47
Independent	Bertrand Proulx	508	1.33
Natural Law	Michel Audy	375	0.98
Independent	Yves Bourret	346	0.91
Independent	Jean-François Rajotte	186	0.49
Independent	Robert Laroche	156	0.41
Total valid votes		38,090	97.88
Total rejected ballots		825	2.12
Turnout		38,915	84.72
Electors on the lists		45,931	–

1992 Charlottetown Accord referendum
Side	Votes	%
Non	24,766	63.79
Oui	14,057	36.21

1989 Quebec general election
Party	Candidate	Votes	%
Liberal	Marc-Yvan Côté	20,818	59.76
Parti Québécois	Alain Pelletier	11,119	31.92
Lemon	Marc Soucy	1,232	3.54
New Democratic	Mario Labbé	1,140	3.27
Progressive Conservative	Philippe Bouchard	529	1.52
Total valid votes		34,838	97.91
Total rejected ballots		742	2.09
Turnout		35,580	80.27
Electors on the lists		44,324	–

1985 Quebec general election
Party	Candidate	Votes	%
Liberal	Marc-Yvan Côté	22,181	62.82
Parti Québécois	Pierre Bernier	8,920	25.26
Progressive Conservative	Denis Harrington	2,076	5.88
New Democratic	Diane Lapointe	1,740	3.27
Parti indépendantiste	Claude Legendre	334	0.94
Christian Socialist	Christian Lefrançois	59	0.17
Total valid votes		35,310	98.60
Total rejected ballots		502	1.40
Turnout		35,812	81.67
Electors on the lists		43,849	–

Quebec provincial by-election, 1983
Party	Candidate	Votes	%
Liberal	Marc-Yvan Côté	17,586	70.06
Parti Québécois	André Gingras	3,273	13.04
Independent	Jacques Daigle	2,302	9.17
Union Nationale	Jacques Arteau	1,722	6.86
Parti nationaliste humain du Québec	René-Lucien Lapointe	144	0.57
United Social Credit	Joseph Ranger	75	0.30
Total valid votes		25,102	98.22
Total rejected ballots		454	1.78
Turnout		25,556	62.02
Electors on the lists		41,208	–

1981 Quebec general election
Party	Candidate	Votes	%
Parti Québécois	Denis de Belleval	19,884	57.32
Liberal	Véronique Guimont Barry	13,886	40.03
Union Nationale	Jacques Morin	762	2.20
Marxist–Leninist	Lynda Forgues	155	0.45
Total valid votes		34,687	98.93
Total rejected ballots		374	1.07
Turnout		35,061	85.98
Electors on the lists		40,780	–

1980 Quebec referendum
Side	Votes	%
Non	25,262	52.26
Oui	23,075	47.74

1976 Quebec general election
Party	Candidate	Votes	%
Parti Québécois	Denis de Belleval	19,985	48.92
Liberal	André Harvey	15,200	37.21
Union Nationale	Henriot Gingras	4,078	9.98
Ralliement créditiste	Sandor Tarcali	1,301	3.19
Parti national populaire	Carmen Payne Lafleur	285	0.70
Total valid votes		40,849	98.34
Total rejected ballots		690	1.66
Turnout		41,539	89.20
Electors on the lists		46,567	–

1973 Quebec general election
Party	Candidate	Votes	%
Liberal	André Harvey	19,770	57.79
Parti Québécois	Laval Grondines	11,598	33.91
Union Nationale	Adrien Drolet	1,964	5.74
Ralliement créditiste	Gérard Croteau	876	2.56
Total valid votes		34,208	98.19
Total rejected ballots		629	1.81
Turnout		34,837	85.16
Electors on the lists		40,908	–

== See also ==
- List of Quebec provincial electoral districts
- Canadian provincial electoral districts
