= François Blais (MNA) =

Canadian politician

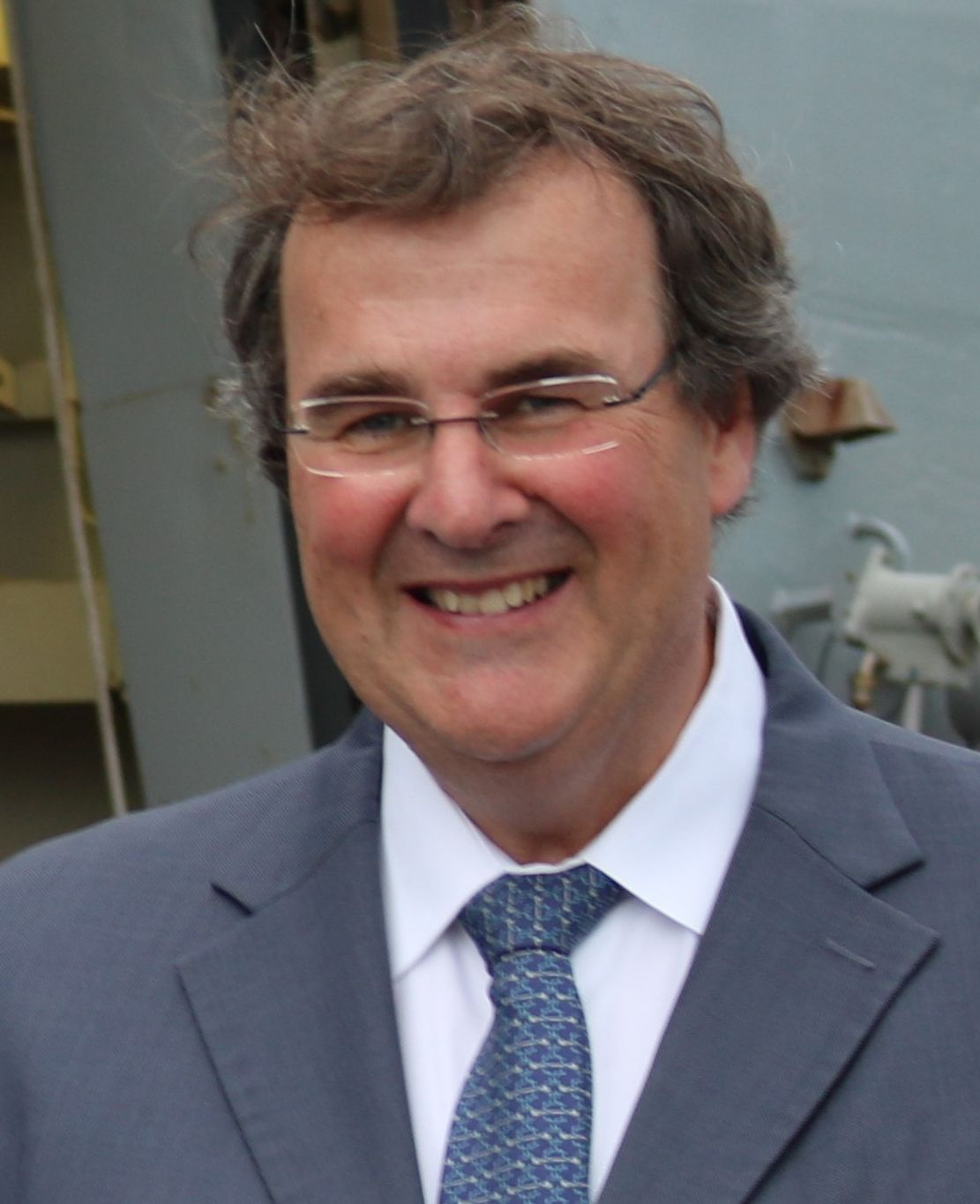

Member of the National Assembly of Quebec for Charlesbourg
- In office April 7, 2014 – August 29, 2018
- Preceded by: Denise Trudel
- Succeeded by: Jonatan Julien

Personal details
- Party: Quebec Liberal Party
- Profession: academic

François Blais is a Canadian politician from Quebec, who was elected to the National Assembly of Quebec in the 2014 election and named Minister of Employment. He represented the electoral district of Charlesbourg as a member of the Quebec Liberal Party. From February 27, 2015, to January 28, 2016, he served as Minister of Education, Recreation and Sports following the resignation of Yves Bolduc. After January 28, he returned to the Employment and Labour portfolio.

He was defeated in the 2018 election by Jonatan Julien of the Coalition Avenir Québec.

Prior to his election to the legislature, Blais was the dean of social sciences at Université Laval.
