= Éloïse Coulombe =

Canadian politician (born 2003)

Éloïse Coulombe MNA

Member of the National Assembly for Charlesbourg
- Incumbent
- Assumed office October 5, 2026
- Preceded by: Jonatan Julien

Personal details
- Born: May 28, 2003 (age 23) Coteau-du-Lac, Quebec
- Party: Conservative Party

Éloïse Coulombe MNA is a Canadian politician who serves as a member of the National Assembly of Quebec representing the electoral district of Charlesbourg since 2026. She is a member of the Conservative Party.

At 23, Coulombe is the youngest MNA in the 44th Quebec legislature.
