= André Harvey (MNA) =

Canadian politician

André Harvey MNA
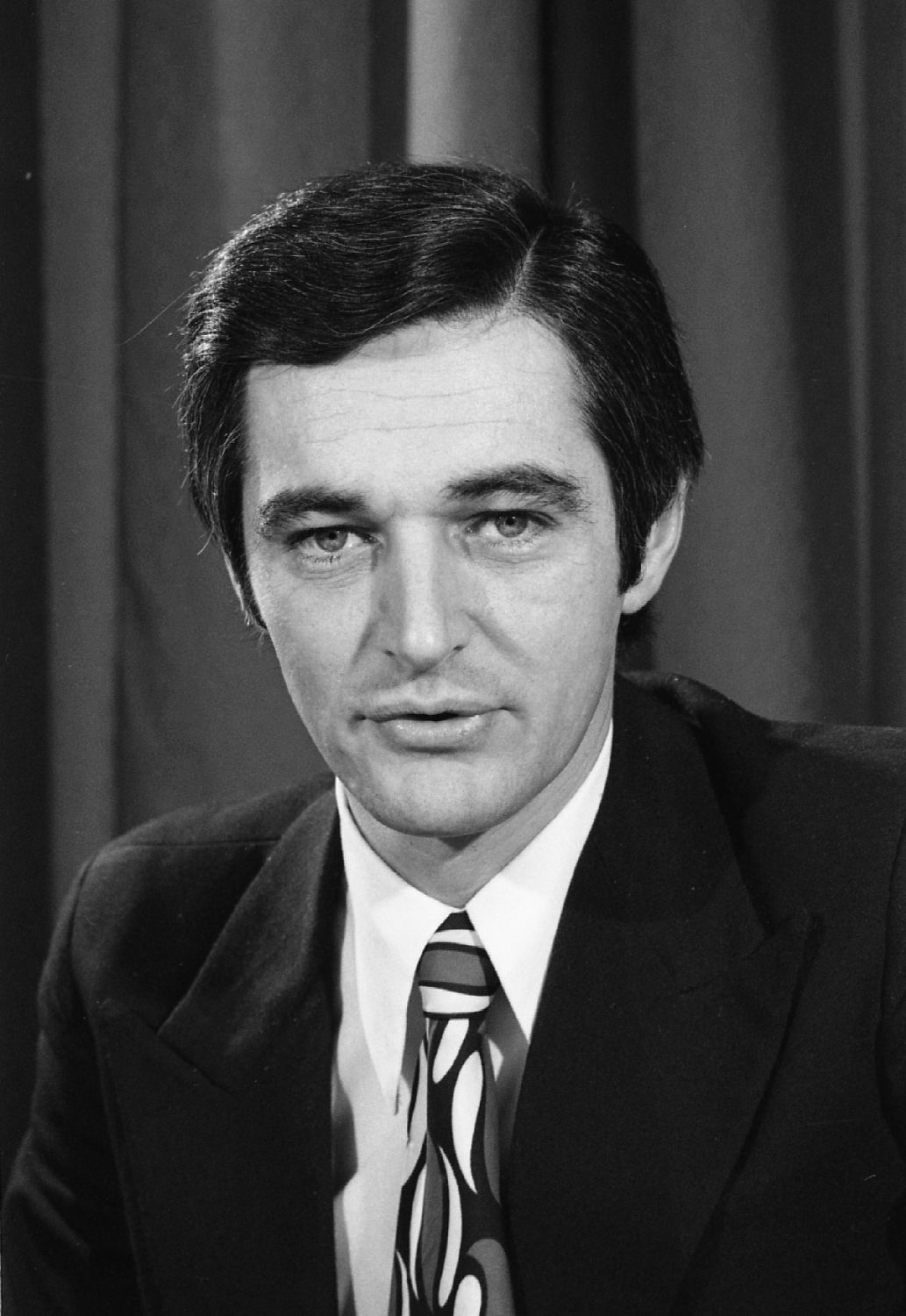
- Harvey in 1971

Member of the National Assembly of Quebec for Chauveau
- In office 1970–1973
- Preceded by: François-Eugène Mathieu
- Succeeded by: Bernard Lachapelle

Member of the National Assembly of Quebec for Charlesbourg
- In office 1973–1976
- Preceded by: first member
- Succeeded by: Denis de Belleval

Personal details
- Born: April 29, 1939 (age 87) Jonquière, Quebec, Canada
- Party: Quebec Liberal Party

André Harvey (born April 29, 1939) is a former Canadian politician who served as a Quebec Liberal Party member of the National Assembly of Quebec from 1970 to 1976.

Born and raised in Jonquière, Quebec, he was educated at Université Laval. He worked as an announcer for CKRS and as a sportswriter for La Presse in the 1950s and 1960s before working in marketing for companies such as Domtar, Ganong Bros. and the Fédération des magasins Coop.

He was first elected to the legislature in the 1970 election, representing the electoral district of Chauveau. In the 1973 election, he shifted to the new electoral district of Charlesbourg and was re-elected to a second term. However, he was defeated in the 1976 election by Denis de Belleval of the Parti Québécois.

He ran again in the 1981 election in the electoral district of Jonquière, but was not reelected.

His brother Gérald Harvey was also a member of the legislature, who represented Jonquière from 1966 to 1976.

== See also ==
- Quebec Liberal Party
- National Assembly of Quebec
- 1970 Quebec general election
- 1973 Quebec general election
- 1976 Quebec general election
- 1981 Quebec general election
- Chauveau (electoral district)
- Charlesbourg (provincial electoral district)
- Jonquière (provincial electoral district)
- Parti Québécois
