= Françoise Gauthier =

Canadian politician

Member of the National Assembly of Quebec for Jonquière
- In office October 1, 2001 – March 26, 2007
- Preceded by: Lucien Bouchard
- Succeeded by: Sylvain Gaudreault

Personal details
- Born: 1 January 1953 (age 73) Laterrière, Quebec
- Party: Liberal

Françoise Gauthier (born 1 January 1953) is a Canadian politician.

Born in Laterrière, Quebec, Gauthier was a member of the National Assembly of Quebec for Jonquière from 2001 to 2007.
