= Yves Bérubé =

Canadian politician (1940–1993)

3rd Member of the Quebec National Assembly for Matane
- In office November 15, 1976 – October 16, 1985
- Premier: René Lévesque
- Preceded by: Marc-Yvan Côté
- Succeeded by: Claire-Hélène Hovington
- Majority: 1976: 2684 (11.86%); 1981: 4367 (17.83%)

Personal details
- Born: March 28, 1940 Montreal, Quebec
- Died: December 5, 1993 (aged 53) Montreal, Quebec
- Resting place: Notre Dame des Neiges Cemetery
- Party: Parti Québécois
- Spouse: Francine Leroux
- Children: 2 daughters [Sylvie, Dominique]
- Education: Massachusetts Institute of Technology
- Profession: Mining engineer, politician

Yves Bérubé (March 28, 1940 – December 5, 1993) was a Quebec engineer, politician and multiple-time minister.

== Biography ==
Bérubé was born in Montreal. His father was a journalist. He studied at the Collège de Saint-Laurent (the modern Cégep Saint-Laurent), then at the Massachusetts Institute of Technology, where he graduated in 1966 with a doctorate in mining engineering. In 1963 (the same year he had obtained his bachelor's degree) he had married Francine Leroux in Montreal.

His career started at the Iron Ore Company of Canada. After obtaining his doctorate, he became assistant, then associate professor at Laval University. During this period, he also taught in France and regularly acted as consultant for several companies and the federal government.

In 1976, he defeated Marc-Yvan Côté and was elected in Matane for the Parti Québécois. He became Minister of Lands and Forests (French: Ministre des Terres et Forêts) as well as Minister of Natural Resources (French: Ministre des Richesses Naturelles), then Minister of Energy and Resources (French: Ministre de l'Énergie et des Ressources) when these two ministries were combined in 1979 (it would become the modern Ministry of Natural Resources and Wildlife).

He was easily re-elected in the 1981 election. In the new government, he was Minister for Administration (French: Ministre délégué à l'Administration; later Minister for Administrative Reform) and President of the Treasury Board. In the March 1984 cabinet shuffle, he was made Minister of Education, a post he left in December upon the creation of the Ministry of Higher Education, Science and Technology (resulting from a merger of the existing Ministry of Science and Technology and part of the Ministry of Education).

As Minister of Energy and Resources, he defended the interest of the Bas-Saint-Laurent and Gaspésie region, eventually getting embroiled in a dispute with federal minister Pierre De Bané over the funding for the establishment of a paper mill in Matane. As Minister of Natural Resources, he presided over the creation of a state corporation for research, prospection and promotion of asbestos, and as President of the Treasury Board, he was instrumental in salary reductions that affection the Quebec public service in the early 80s.

On October 16, 1985, shortly after the resignation of René Lévesque as Prime Minister, Bérubé and two other ministers, Yves Duhaime (Finances) and Clément Richard (Cultural Affairs), resigned together. In the ensuing shuffle, four unelected ministers were named, the largest number since 1936 and the first time since 1970.

Following his resignation, he worked at SNC-Lavalin, becoming executive vice-president in 1991. The following year, he became president of the Société d'habitation et de développement de Montréal before dying the next year, on December 5, from a brain tumor. He is buried in Notre Dame des Neiges Cemetery. He had two daughters at the time of his death.

== Sources ==
National Assembly of Quebec
Preceded by Marc-Yvan Côté	Member of the National Assembly of Quebec; Representative for Matane; 1976–1985	Vacant resigned Title next held by Claire-Hélène Hovington
Political offices
Preceded by Thomas Kevin Drummond	Minister of Lands and Forests; 1976–1979	Succeeded by Himself as Minister of Energy and Ressources
Preceded by Jean Cournoyer	Minister of Natural Ressources; 1976–1979	Succeeded by Himself as Minister of Energy and Ressources
First	Minister of Energy and Ressources; 1979–1981	Succeeded by Yves Duhaime
First	Minister for Administration and Minister for Administrative Reform; 1981–1984	Succeeded by Michel Clair
Preceded by Jacques Parizeau	President of the Treasury Board of Quebec; 1981–1984	Succeeded by Michel Clair
Preceded by Camille Laurin	Minister of Education march-december 1984	Succeeded by François Gendron as Minister of Education
Preceded by Gilbert Paquette as Minister of Science and Technology	Minister of Higher Education, Science and Technology; 1984–1985	Succeeded by Jean-Guy Rodrigue
