= Yannick Gagnon =

Canadian politician

Member of the National Assembly of Quebec for Jonquière
- In office October 3, 2022 – October 5, 2026
- Preceded by: Sylvain Gaudreault
- Succeeded by: Jimmy Bouchard

Personal details
- Born: 1979 (age 46–47) Jonquière, Quebec
- Party: Coalition Avenir Québec

Yannick Gagnon is a Canadian politician, who was elected to the National Assembly of Quebec in the 2022 Quebec general election. He represented the riding of Jonquière as a member of the Coalition Avenir Québec.

== Electoral record ==
2022 Quebec general election: Jonquière
Party	Candidate	Votes	%	±%
Coalition Avenir Québec	Yannick Gagnon	18,196	59.39	+26.92
Parti Québécois	Caroline Dubé	5,912	19.30	–29.06
Conservative	Isabelle Champagne	2,926	9.55	+8.46
Québec solidaire	Karla Cynthia Garcia Martinez	2,778	9.07	+1.79
Liberal	Wilda Solon	648	2.12	–7.72
Parti nul	Line Bélanger	177	0.58	New
Total valid votes		30,637	98.75	
Total rejected ballots		387	1.25	–0.16
Turnout		31,024	68.46	–0.80
Electors on the lists		45,320		
Coalition Avenir Québec gain from Parti Québécois		Swing		+27.99
Source: Élections Québec
