= Denis de Belleval =

Canadian politician

MNA for Charlesbourg
- In office 1976–1982
- Preceded by: André Harvey
- Succeeded by: Marc-Yvan Côté

Personal details
- Born: June 4, 1939 (age 86) Quebec City, Quebec
- Party: Parti Québécois
- Profession: Civil Servant

Denis de Belleval (born June 4, 1939) is a former politician and administrator in the Canadian province of Quebec. He was a Parti Québécois member of the National Assembly of Quebec from 1976 to 1982 and was a cabinet minister in the government of René Lévesque. He has also held several administrative positions, including a two-year tenure as the president of Via Rail.

== Early life and career ==
De Belleval was born in Quebec City, Quebec. He has a Bachelor of Arts degree in Philosophy (1960) and a master's degree in the social sciences with a focus in public administration (1965), both from the Université Laval. He met future prime minister Brian Mulroney while attending university and remained friends with Mulroney for many years thereafter. In 1964, De Belleval was a co-founder of the Union générale des étudiants du Québec (UGEQ).

De Belleval took doctoral studies in political science at the London School of Economics from 1965 to 1967. After returning to Quebec, he served as executive assistant to the deputy minister of education from 1967 to 1969. He held other government positions related to development and planning from 1970 to 1974 and was the assistant deputy minister of transport from 1974 to 1976.

== Legislator and cabinet minister ==
=== Public service minister ===
De Belleval was elected to the Quebec legislature in the 1976 provincial election, defeating Liberal incumbent André Harvey in the Charlesbourg division in the Quebec City area. The Parti Québécois won a historic majority government in this election, and de Belleval was appointed to René Lévesque's first cabinet on November 26, 1976, as minister of the public service and vice-president of the treasury board. The Lévesque cabinet included representatives from different sides of the political spectrum, and de Belleval was regarded as one of its more conservative members.

On March 2, 1978, Lévesque shifted the vice-presidency of the treasury board from de Belleval to Jacques Léonard. He said that the change would allow de Belleval to better focus on upcoming negotiations with civil servants, nurses, and teachers. De Belleval took part in difficult wage negotiations with the Syndicat des Fonctionnaires Provinciaux du Québec in mid-1979; at one stage, the civil servants took part in rotating walkouts, and de Belleval threatened to lock out entire government departments.

De Belleval argued in April 1978 that Quebec's hiring laws should be modified to facilitate the entry of more anglophones into the civil service. He added that the anglophone community would need to be more active in engaging with the civil service than before. In the winter of 1979–80, he said that the Quebec government would not object to civil servants taking part in the upcoming referendum campaign on sovereignty.

Separate from his duties as the public service minister, de Belleval also proposed a reciprocity formula that allowed English Canadians moving to Quebec from other provinces to enroll their children in English-language schools in return for the other provinces making similar arrangements for their own minority language communities. The provincial cabinet had previously been divided on the issue of English-language education, and Lévesque agreed to de Belleval's formula as a compromise.

=== Transport minister ===
De Belleval was named as transport minister after a cabinet shuffle on September 21, 1979. In December of the same year, he issued a five-year transit plan for Montreal valued at just under one billion dollars. The plan called for expanded subway lines, the integration of commuter lines between Montreal and its suburbs, and a new electric train system on existing lines. After some delays, the project was re-launched with assistance from the federal government in February 1981. In the same period, de Belleval oversaw grants for three traffic projects in the Quebec City area and pledged $8.5 million to complete an expressway interchange for the city.

In September 1980, de Belleval announced that the Quebec government had purchased an eleven per cent stake in the Nordair airline and was supporting efforts from a group led by Quebecair president Alfred Hamel to purchase Nordair from Air Canada. The Canadian federal government questioned the legality of this purchase and subsequently announced an indefinite delay of the airline's sale. De Belleval later issued an alternate proposal that Nordair purchase Quebecair in a "reverse takeover" that would lead to a merger. The plans were ultimately unsuccessful, and the airlines were not merged.

=== Government backbencher ===
De Belleval was re-elected without difficulty in the 1981 provincial election as the Parti Québécois won a second majority government across the province. He was dropped from cabinet on April 30, 1981, and afterwards served as a government backbencher; the journalist Graham Fraser has suggested that his demotion was prompted by an intense argument with Lévesque at a cabinet meeting in late 1980. It was rumoured that he might return to cabinet in 1982 after he submitted a twenty-page policy paper proposing a "solitary fund" for development to be administered jointly by business, labour, and the state. He was not promoted, however, and he resigned his seat in the legislature on December 7, 1982, to accept a job in the private sector.

== Administrator ==
De Belleval served as vice-president of Lavalin International from 1983 to 1985, working in Algiers. He returned to Quebec in 1985 when the government of Canada appointed him as president and chief executive officer of Ports Canada. Some critics described the appointment as patronage, citing de Belleval's longtime friendship with Prime Minister Brian Mulroney. De Belleval rejected that charge.

De Belleval oversaw federally owned harbour land in Montreal and Quebec City during his time as president of Ports Canada. The crown corporation posted a $52 million profit for 1985, $6 million lower than the previous year; de Belleval blamed a fall in grain shipments for the discrepancy.

=== Via Rail ===
The Mulroney government subsequently appointed de Belleval as president and chief executive officer of Via Rail, with a term starting on July 1, 1987. Following his appointment, de Belleval pursued an expansion strategy for Via's services and said that he wanted to "[build] a modern railway for the 21st century." In September 1989, he announced the opening of a maintenance centre in Montreal valued at $139 million. During the same period, he acknowledged that Via had often ignored the needs of Western Canada and pledged to correct this in the future. He was able to announce that Via had increased its ridership by ten per cent in 1988, following years of decline.

Rumours circulated in early 1989 that the Mulroney government was planning significant cuts to passenger rail. De Belleval responded with a forceful appeal in defense of the sector that argued that rail service was vital to Canada's transport needs and rejected suggestions that public money would be better spent on road construction or upgrades to air travel. Promoting long-term strategies such as a high-speed link between Montreal and Toronto and increased tourist travel, de Belleval urged the Mulroney government to maintain its existing levels of support. He also launched a cross-Canada tour in support of passenger rail, before being ordered to stop by Mulroney.

De Belleval's efforts were ultimately unsuccessful, and the Mulroney government announced in April 1989 that it would cut Via's subsidy by five hundred million dollars over the next four years. De Belleval resigned his position a week later at the request of federal transport minister Benoît Bouchard. At a press conference, de Belleval said that the Mulroney government's funding cuts were incompatible with his plans for the company. Via later made massive cuts to its passenger service lines across the country.

=== 1990 to present ===
De Belleval was appointed as director general of Quebec City, the top administrative position in the city, in May 1990. He served in this position until 1995. He was then the province of Quebec's delegate-general in Brussels from 1996 to 1999, before returning to serve another term as director general of Quebec City from 2001 to 2006.

A longtime friend of prominent Quebec politician Lucien Bouchard, de Belleval was present when Bouchard was hospitalized in late 1994 to receive treatment for a life-threatening battle with necrotizing fasciitis, a flesh-eating disease.

In the fall of 2007, De Belleval began work on a Ph.D. in public administration from the Université du Québec.

De Belleval strongly criticized a 2011 deal between Quebec City and Quebecor to oversee a future amphitheatre in the city. He described the city's deal with Quebecor with a phrase translating as "worthy of a banana republic" and announced in April 2011 that he would seek to nullify it via a court challenge.

== Electoral record ==
1981 Quebec general election: Charlesbourg
Party	Candidate	Votes	%	±%
Parti Québécois	Denis de Belleval	19,884	57.32	
Liberal	Véronique Guimont Barry	13,886	40.03	
Union Nationale	Jacques Morin	762	2.20	–
Marxist–Leninist	Lynda Forgues	155	0.45	
Total valid votes		34,687	100.00	
Rejected and declined votes		374		
Turnout		35,061	85.98	
Electors on the lists		40,780		

1976 Quebec general election: Charlesbourg
Party	Candidate	Votes	%	±%
Parti Québécois	Denis de Belleval	19,985	48.92	
Liberal	André Harvey	15,200	37.21	
Union Nationale	Henriot Gingras	4,078	9.98	–
Ralliement créditiste	Sandor Tarçali	1,301	3.18	
Parti national populaire	Carmen Payne Lafleur	285	0.70	
Total valid votes		40,849	100.00	
Rejected and declined votes		690		
Turnout		41,539	89.20	
Electors on the lists		46,567		
