= Catherine Morissette =

Canadian politician

MNA for Charlesbourg
- In office April 25, 2007 – November 5, 2008
- Preceded by: Éric Mercier
- Succeeded by: Michel Pigeon

Personal details
- Born: February 3, 1979 (age 47) Quebec City, Quebec, Canada
- Party: Action démocratique du Québec
- Spouse: Normand Barrette
- Profession: Lawyer

Catherine Morissette (born February 3, 1979, in Quebec City, Quebec) is a politician and lawyer from Quebec, Canada. She was an Action démocratique du Québec Member of the National Assembly for the electoral district of Charlesbourg from 2007 to 2008.

She graduated from Université Laval in 2003 after obtaining a bachelor's degree in international law. She also studied at the University of Paris-V in international studies. She was admitted to the Quebec Bar in 2005.

She worked as a clerk for the Manitoba Ministry of Justice and was a lawyer for three years for the Quebec City-based law firm of Daignault et associés. She is also a member of organizations such as Avocats sans Frontieres (Lawyers without borders), the Quebec Chamber of Commerce and the Quebec businesspeople Chamber of Commerce. Before her election, Morissette was Vice-President of the ADQ.

Morissette was first elected in the 2007 election with 43% of the vote. Liberal incumbent Éric Mercier, finished second with 27% of the vote. Former Bloc Québécois Member of Parliament and Parti Québécois star candidate Richard Marceau finished third with 25% of the vote. Morissette took office on April 12, 2007, and was named the critic for immigration and cultural communities. She was also named the President of the Public Finances Committee. She lost in the 2008 election to Liberal Michel Pigeon.
