= Saguenay =

Saguenay may refer to:

== Places in Canada ==
- Saguenay, Quebec, a city
- Saguenay River, a major river in Quebec
- Saguenay–Lac-Saint-Jean, the region of the Saguenay
- Le Fjord-du-Saguenay Regional County Municipality (The Saguenay Fjord), Regional County Municipality in Quebec
- Le Saguenay-et-son-Fjord, a statistical area
- Petit-Saguenay, Quebec, a municipality in Quebec
- Saguenay County, Quebec, a historical county in Quebec

== Electoral districts ==
- Saguenay (provincial electoral district), a former Quebec provincial electoral district
- Chicoutimi-Saguenay (provincial electoral district), a former Quebec provincial electoral district
- Charlevoix—Saguenay (provincial electoral district), a former Quebec provincial electoral district
- Chicoutimi—Saguenay (federal electoral district), a defunct federal electoral district in Quebec
- Charlevoix—Saguenay (federal electoral district), a defunct federal electoral district in Quebec

== Geology ==
- Saguenay Graben, a geologic structure in Quebec enclosing the Saguenay River.

== Other uses ==
- Saguenay (ship), a Canadian steamship
- Saguenay (train), a passenger train in Quebec, Canada
- Saguenay flood, a series of flash floods that hit the Saguenay-Lac-Saint-Jean region of Quebec, Canada in July 1996
- Saguenay French, a dialect of Quebec French
- Saguenay Herald, an officer of arms at the Canadian Heraldic Authority
- HMCS Saguenay, two ships that served the Royal Canadian Navy
- Kingdom of Saguenay, an Iroquoian legend

== See also ==
- Saguenay–St. Lawrence Marine Park, a National Marine Conservation Area
- Zec de la Rivière-Petit-Saguenay, a zone d'exploitation contrôlée (controlled harvesting zone) in Quebec
- Zec de la Rivière-Saint-Jean-du-Saguenay, a zone d'exploitation contrôlée (controlled harvesting zone) in Québec
