= Laure Gaudreault =

Canadian teacher, trade unionist and journalist (1889–1975)

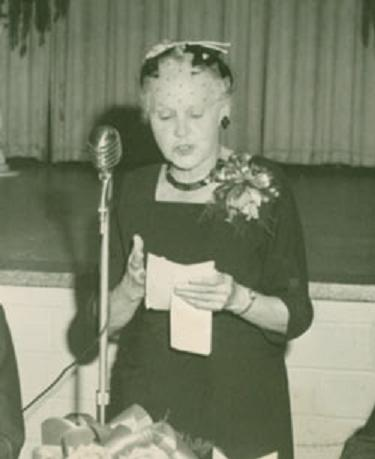
- Laure Gaudreault speaking to the General Corporation of Catholic Teachers of the Province of Quebec (CIC) in 1959
- Born: October 25, 1889; La Malbaie, Quebec, Canada
- Died: January 19, 1975 (aged 85); Clermont, Quebec, Canada
- Occupations: Teacher, trade unionist, and journalist
- Years active: 1905–1974

Laure Gaudreault (October 25, 1889 – January 19, 1975) was a Canadian teacher, trade unionist, and journalist. She worked to improve working conditions and wages, and later, retirement rights, for rural women teachers.

== Biography ==
Laure Gaudreault was born on October 25, 1889, in La Malbaie, Quebec, Canada. Her mother educated her at home, and when she was 15 years old she earned her teaching certificate. The next year, she attended l'École Normale Laval in Quebec City. Gaudreault began teaching at the country schools in Charlevoix when she was 16. After a few years of teaching, she joined the Ursulines of Quebec, but left two years after joining because of health problems. Before returning to teaching, she began writing for the local publications about subjects including poor working conditions for rural female educators.

In 1936, Gaudreault returned to teaching, and noticed that conditions hadn't changed. This same year, the government issued a wage freeze for rural teachers. Gaudreault organized the other teachers in her region to form its first teachers' union, the Association des institutrices rurales de la province de Québec (Association of Rural Teachers of the Province of Quebec). Over the next year, over thirteen regional women's teachers unions were created. In 1937 she created the Fédération des institutrices rurales de la province de Québec (Federation of Rural Teachers of the Province of Quebec), and delegates from the regional teachers' unions appointed her as president. This made her the first paid secular trade unionist in Quebec. To ensure the regional associations would communicate, she created La Petite feuille, a periodical that continued to be published for nine years. After nine years, the Federation of Rural Teachers was replaced by the Corporation des instituteurs et institutrices de la province de Québec (Corporation of Teachers of the Province of Quebec), and La Petite feuille was replaced by a publication titled l'Enseignement. In 1945, the Federation succeeded in achieving an annual minimum wage of $600 for teachers. This was increased to $1,500 in 1959.

In 1945, Gaudreault helped to create the Corporation générale des instituteurs et institutrices de la province de Québec (General Corporation of Teachers of the Province of Quebec), a group that combined the teachers' unions in the region.

In 1961, Gaudreault turned her focus to retirement rights for rural teachers and created the Association des instituteurs et institutrices catholiques retraités du Québec (Quebec Association of Retired Catholic Teachers), which later became AREQ (Association des retraitées et retraités de l'enseignement du Québec; the Association of Retired Teachers of Quebec). Gaudreault worked until her retirement in 1974. She died on January 19, 1975, in Clermont, Quebec.
