= Jonatan Julien =

Canadian politician (born 1972)

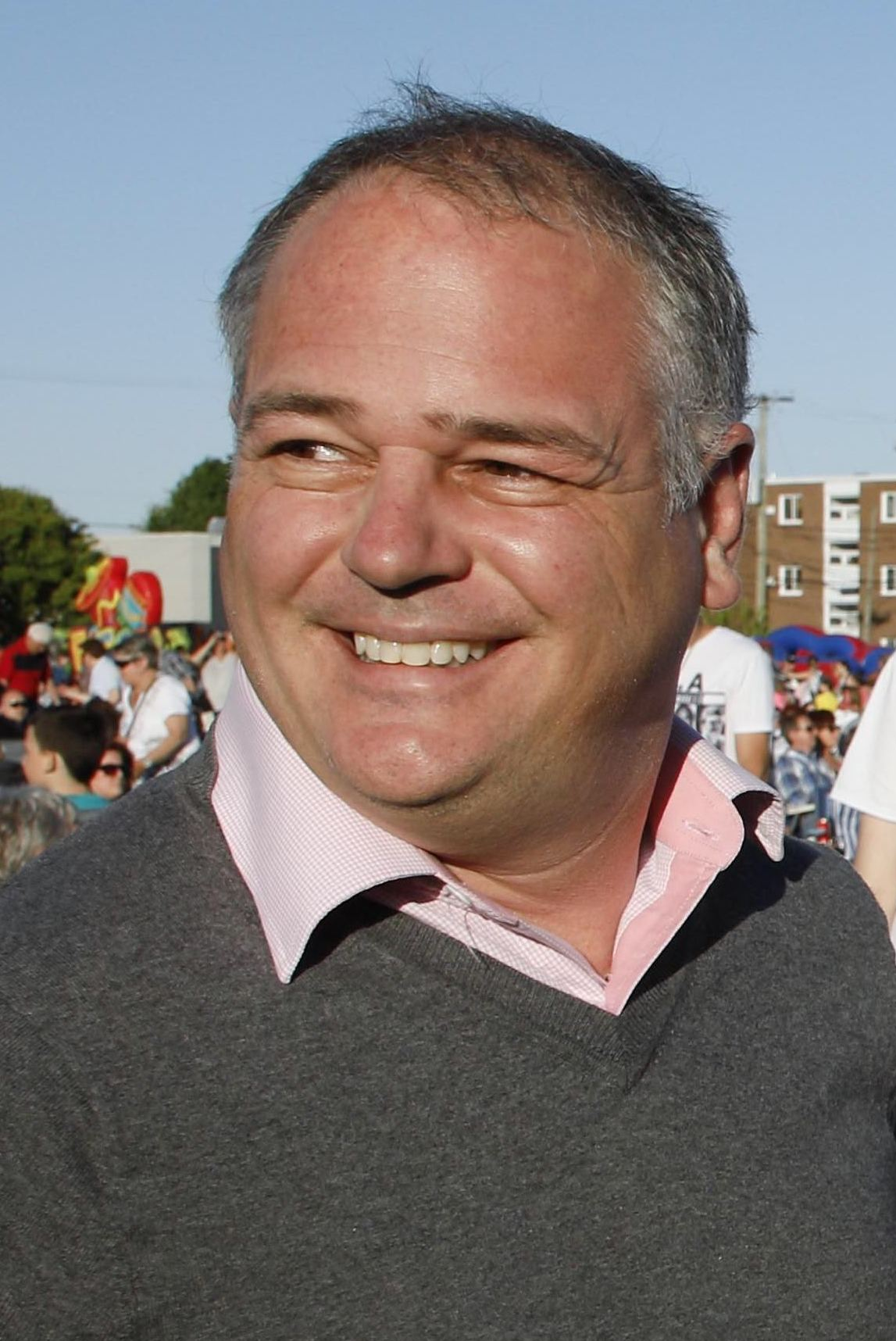
- Julien in 2019

Member of the National Assembly of Quebec for Charlesbourg
- In office October 1, 2018 – August 27, 2026
- Preceded by: François Blais
- Succeeded by: Éloïse Coulombe

Personal details
- Born: March 20, 1972 (age 54) Quebec City
- Party: Coalition Avenir Québec

Jonatan Julien (born March 20, 1972) is a Canadian politician who was elected to the National Assembly of Quebec in the 2018 provincial election. He represented the electoral district of Charlesbourg as a member of the Coalition Avenir Québec. He did not seek re-election in the 2026 general election.

Prior to his election in the National Assembly, he was a city councillor in the municipal district of Neufchâtel-Lebourgneuf for the Quebec City Council from 2013 to 2018.

== Electoral record ==
=== Provincial ===
2022 Quebec general election: Charlesbourg
| Party | Candidate | Votes | % | ±% |
|---|---|---|---|---|
| Coalition Avenir Québec | Jonatan Julien | 18,921 | 45.00 | –3.13 |
| Conservative | Jean Domingue | 8,564 | 20.37 | +16.69 |
| Parti Québécois | Priscilla Corbeil | 5,967 | 14.19 | +2.47 |
| Québec solidaire | Ève Duhaime | 5,486 | 13.05 | –0.47 |
| Liberal | Mahamadou Sissoko | 2,518 | 5.99 | –16.45 |
| Green | Odevie Essaidi | 348 | 0.83 | New |
| Parti 51 | David Cantin | 163 | 0.39 | New |
| Démocratie directe | Daniel Pelletier | 75 | 0.18 | New |
| Total valid votes | | 42,042 | 98.66 | |
| Total rejected ballots | | 570 | 1.34 | –0.60 |
| Turnout | | 42,612 | 74.60 | +1.23 |
| Electors on the lists | | 57,117 | | |
| Coalition Avenir Québec hold | | Swing | | –9.91 |
Source: Élections Québec

2018 Quebec general election: Charlesbourg
| Party | Candidate | Votes | % | ±% |
|---|---|---|---|---|
| Coalition Avenir Québec | Jonatan Julien | 19,985 | 48.13 | +15.70 |
| Liberal | François Blais | 9,319 | 22.44 | -19.63 |
| Québec solidaire | Élisabeth Germain | 5,613 | 13.52 | +8.71 |
| Parti Québécois | Annie Morin | 4,868 | 11.72 | -6.20 |
| Conservative | Valérie Tremblay | 1,530 | 3.68 | +2.57 |
| Équipe Autonomiste | Daniel Pelletier | 212 | 0.51 | |
| Total valid votes | | 41,527 | 98.06 | |
| Total rejected ballots | | 821 | 1.94 | |
| Turnout | | 42,348 | 73.37 | |
| Eligible voters | | 57,722 | | |
| Coalition Avenir Québec gain from Liberal | | Swing | | +17.67 |
Source(s) "Rapport des résultats officiels du scrutin". Élections Québec.
