= Sylvain Gaudreault =

Canadian politician

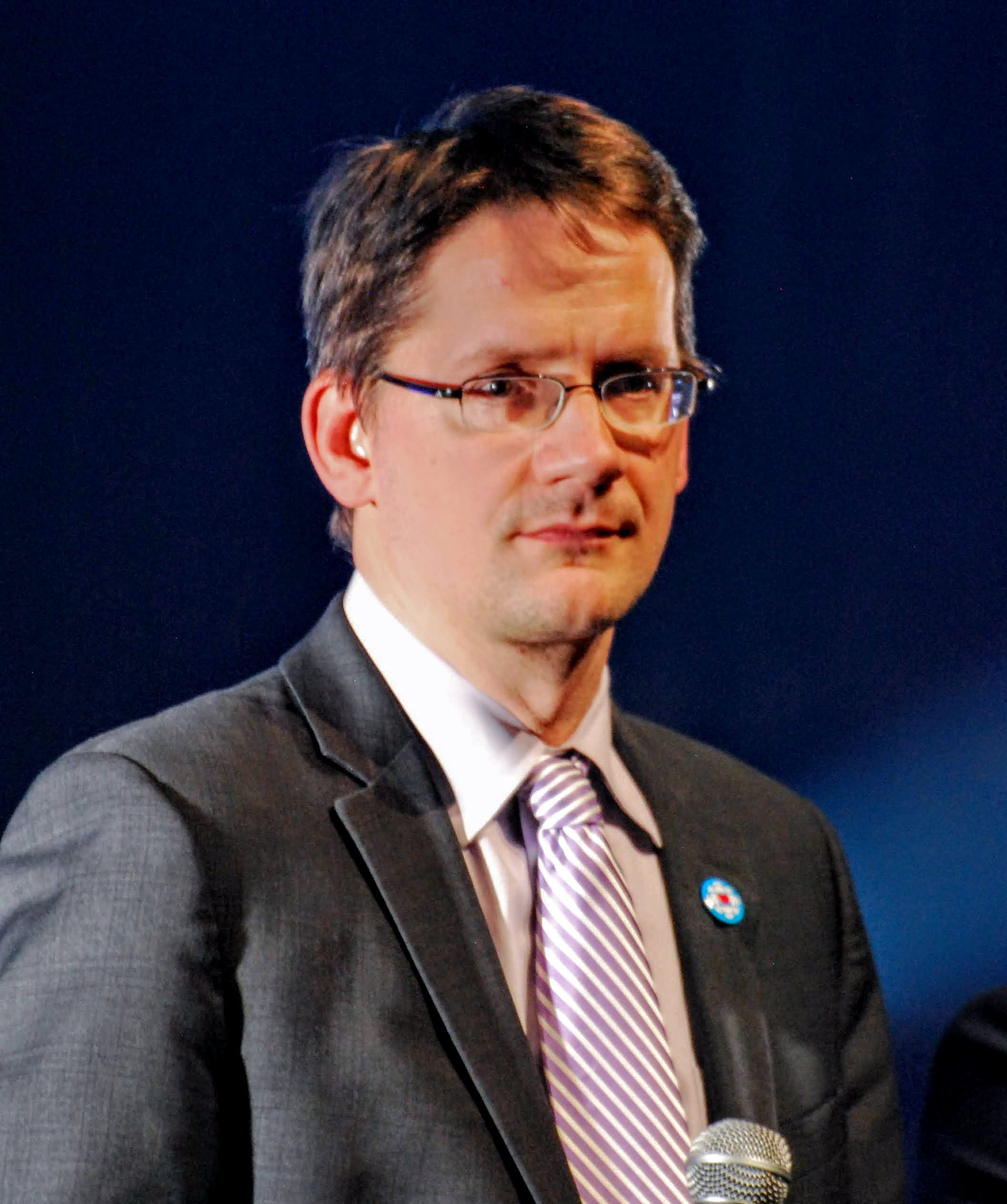
- Gaudreault in 2014

Leader of the Opposition in Quebec
- In office May 6, 2016 – October 7, 2016
- Preceded by: Pierre Karl Péladeau
- Succeeded by: Jean-François Lisée

Interim Leader of the Parti Québécois
- In office May 6, 2016 – October 7, 2016
- Preceded by: Pierre Karl Péladeau
- Succeeded by: Jean-François Lisée

Member of the National Assembly of Quebec for Jonquière
- In office March 26, 2007 – August 28, 2022
- Preceded by: Françoise Gauthier
- Succeeded by: Yannick Gagnon

Personal details
- Born: July 8, 1970 (age 56) Chicoutimi, Quebec, Canada
- Party: Parti Québécois
- Education: Université du Québec à Chicoutimi; Université Laval
- Profession: teacher
- Portfolio: Energy

Sylvain Gaudreault (born July 8, 1970) is a Canadian politician and teacher. He was the Member of National Assembly of Quebec for the riding of Jonquière in the city of Saguenay from 2007 to 2022. He represented the Parti Québécois. On May 6, 2016, the party caucus chose him as interim leader following the resignation of PQ leader Pierre Karl Péladeau.

== Life and career ==
Born in Chicoutimi, Quebec, Gaudreault went to the Université du Québec à Chicoutimi and obtained a bachelor's degree in history. He also received a bachelor's degree in law at Université Laval and was admitted to the Barreau du Québec in 1996. He is also currently doing a master's degree in regional intervention and studies. He worked since 2001 as a teacher at CEGEP de Jonquière and worked for the newspaper Le Quotidien.

Gaudreault was elected in Jonquière in the 2007 elections when he defeated Tourism Minister Françoise Gauthier. He had faced controversy during the campaign, when radio host Louis Champagne attacked both Gaudreault and Parti Québécois leader André Boisclair for being openly gay.

When the PQ formed government in 2012, Gaudreault entered Cabinet as Minister of Transport and Minister of Municipal Affairs, one of two LGBT ministers. While his stint in Cabinet only last 19 months due to the PQ's defeat in the subsequent election, he announced plans to extend the Montreal Metro's Blue Line to Anjou and the Yellow Line deeper into the Montérégie. As well, he became the point person on the government's plans to further electrify public transit across Quebec.

He ran for party leader in the 2020 Parti Québécois leadership election, placing second behind Paul St-Pierre Plamondon.

He chose to not seek for reelection in the 2022 general election.
