= Claude Vaillancourt =

Canadian politician

Claude Vaillancourt (French pronunciation: [klod vajɑ̃kuʁ]; born May 19, 1944) is a lawyer, judge and former political figure in Quebec. He represented Jonquière in the Quebec National Assembly from 1976 to 1983 as a member of the Parti Québécois.

He was born in Chicoutimi, Quebec, the son of Albéric Vaillancourt and Marie-Paule Simard, and was educated in Arvida, at the Collège de Jonquière and at the Université Laval. Vaillancourt was admitted to the Quebec bar in 1969 and set up practice in the Jonquière region. He served as President of the National Assembly from 1980 to 1983. Vaillancourt resigned his seat in 1983, when he was named a Quebec district court judge. He served in the Roberval district from 1983 to 1989 and in the Montreal district from 1989 to 2006.
