= Saint-Cœur-de-Marie, Quebec =

Community in Quebec, Canada

Coordinates: 48°38′N 71°42′W

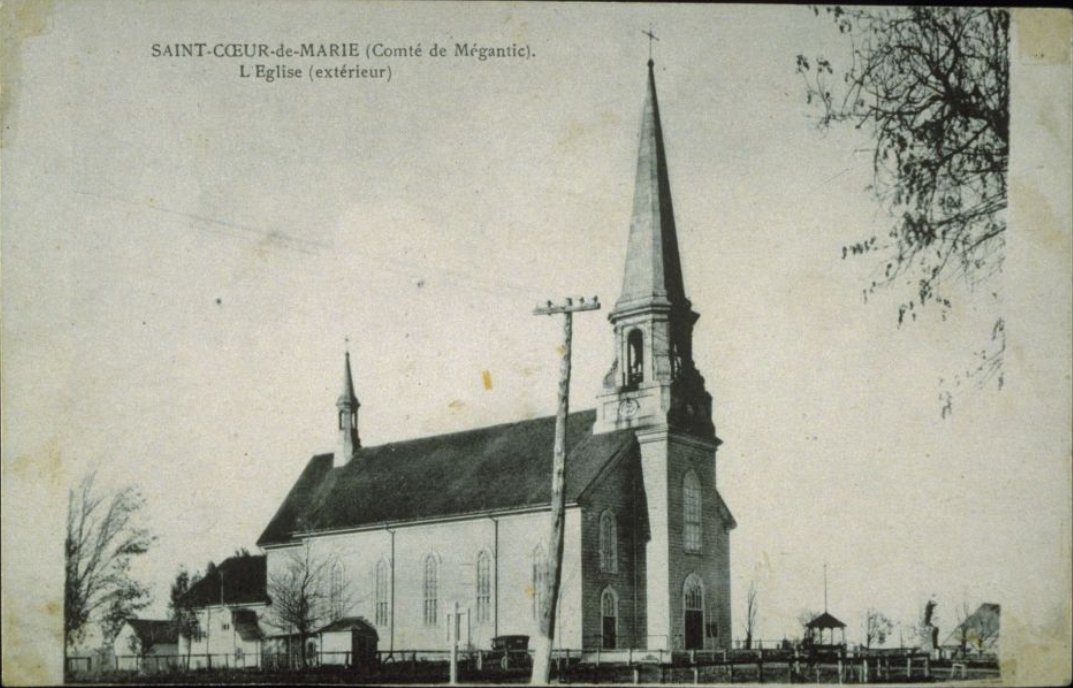
Church of Saint-Coeur-de-Marie

Saint-Cœur-de-Marie (French pronunciation: [sɛ̃ kœʁ də maʁi]) is a community in the Canadian province of Quebec, located in the city of Alma in the Saguenay–Lac-Saint-Jean region.

The community was the birthplace of former Quebec premier Lucien Bouchard.
