= Marc-Yvan Côté =

Canadian politician

MNA for Matane
- In office 1973–1976
- Preceded by: Jean Bienvenue
- Succeeded by: Yves Bérubé

MNA for Charlesbourg
- In office 1983–1994
- Preceded by: Denis de Belleval
- Succeeded by: Jean Rochon

Personal details
- Born: March 27, 1947 (age 79)
- Party: Liberal Party of Quebec
- Profession: Teacher

Marc-Yvan Côté (born March 27, 1947, in Sainte-Anne-des-Monts, Quebec) is a former Quebec politician and Cabinet Minister for the Quebec Liberal Party. He was the Health and Social Services Minister in the Robert Bourassa government from 1989 to 1994.

== Education and professional career ==
A graduate from the Université du Québec à Trois-Rivières in political sciences and history, Côté was a geography and history teacher at a local high school in Sainte-Anne-des-Monts in the Gaspésie region for two years.

== Political career ==
Cote's first stint in provincial politics lasted three years from 1973 to 1976 in which he was elected in Matane before losing his seat in the 1976 elections when the Parti Québécois rose to power for the first time ever. After losing his seat, Cote worked for the Liberals until he returned as MNA in Charlesbourg in a 1983 by-election.

Re-elected in 1985 when the Liberals and Bourassa returned to power, Cote was named Minister of Transports until his-reelection in 1989. He was named the Minister of Health and Social Services and was in charge in following the recommendations made by the Rochon Commission for the improvement of the health and social services system.

== Sponsorship scandal ==
Côté resigned a few months before the 1994 elections but was still an active member for the Liberals as a campaign organizer until the sponsorship scandal when his membership was revoked when his name was circulating among those who were involved in money contributions for Liberal election campaigns via the defunct program. He mentioned during the Gomery Commission that he accepted $120 000, from the general manager of the Quebec chapter of the party Michel Béliveau, for the Liberal campaign of 1997. He was expelled by former federal Liberal Prime Minister Paul Martin after the Commission but Liberal leader successor Stéphane Dion considered to re-integrate Cote as well as former Jean Chrétien Cabinet Chief Jean Pelletier.

== Maltais lawsuit ==
In 2006, Côté launched a lawsuit against Parti Québécois MNA for Taschereau Agnès Maltais for defamatory comments when she told that Côté participated in the closure of the Quebec Zoo.

== Electoral record (partial) ==
Quebec provincial by-election, June 20, 1983: Charlesbourg
Party	Candidate	Votes	%
Liberal	Marc-Yvan Côté	17,586	70.06
Parti Québécois	André Gingras	3,273	13.04
Independent	Jacques Daigle	2,302	9.17
Union Nationale	Jacques Arteau	1,722	6.86
Nationaliste humain	René-Lucien Lapointe	144	0.57
United Social Credit	Joseph Ranger	75	0.30
Total valid votes		25,102	
Rejected and declined votes		454	
Turnout		25,556	62.02
Electors on the lists		41,208	
Source: Official Results, Government of Quebec
