= Lucien Bouchard =

Premier of Quebec from 1996 to 2001

The Honourable Lucien Bouchard PC GOQ
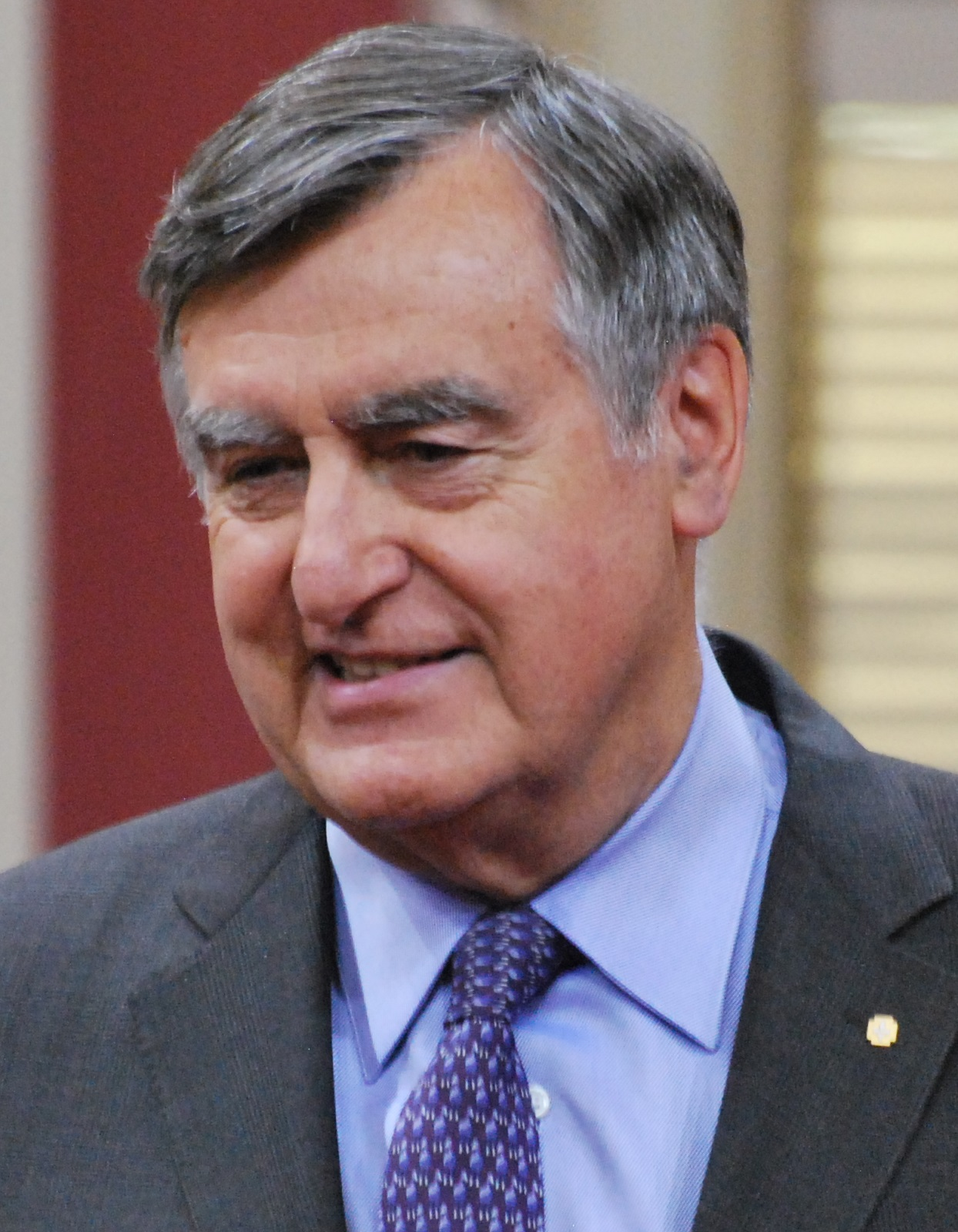
- Bouchard in 2013

27th Premier of Quebec
- In office January 29, 1996 – March 8, 2001
- Monarch: Elizabeth II
- Lieutenant Governor: Martial Asselin; Jean-Louis Roux; Lise Thibault
- Deputy: Bernard Landry
- Preceded by: Jacques Parizeau
- Succeeded by: Bernard Landry

President of the Parti Québécois
- In office January 27, 1996 – March 2, 2001
- Preceded by: Jacques Parizeau
- Succeeded by: Bernard Landry

Leader of the Opposition
- In office November 4, 1993 – January 14, 1996
- Preceded by: Jean Chrétien
- Succeeded by: Gilles Duceppe

Leader of the Bloc Québécois
- In office July 25, 1990 – January 16, 1996
- Preceded by: Position established
- Succeeded by: Gilles Duceppe (interim)
Mulroney Cabinet
Minister of the Environment
In office December 8, 1988 – May 21, 1990; Acting: December 8, 1988 – January 30, 1989
Prime Minister	Brian Mulroney
Preceded by	Thomas McMillan
Succeeded by	Robert de Cotret
Secretary of State for Canada
In office March 31, 1988 – January 29, 1989
Prime Minister	Brian Mulroney
Preceded by	David Crombie
Succeeded by	Gerry Weiner
Minister of Supply and Services Receiver General for Canada
In office March 31, 1988 – January 29, 1989
Prime Minister	Brian Mulroney
Preceded by	Stewart McInnes (acting)
Succeeded by	Paul Dick
Parliamentary constituencies
Member of the National Assembly of Quebec for Jonquière
In office February 19, 1996 – March 8, 2001
Preceded by	Francis Dufour
Succeeded by	Françoise Gauthier
Member of Parliament for Lac-Saint-Jean
In office June 20, 1988 – January 15, 1996
Preceded by	Clément M. Côté
Succeeded by	Stéphan Tremblay

Personal details
- Born: December 22, 1938 (age 87) Saint-Cœur-de-Marie, Quebec, Canada
- Party: Parti Québécois (provincial, 1990–2010); Bloc Québécois (federal, 1990–2010)
- Other political affiliations: Progressive Conservative (federal, c. 1984–1990)
- Spouse(s): Jocelyne Côte (m. 1966, divorced) Audrey Best (separated) Solange Dugas (m. 2013)
- Children: 2
- Education: Université Laval
- Profession: Lawyer

Lucien Bouchard (French pronunciation: [lysjɛ̃ buʃɑʁ]; born December 22, 1938) is a Canadian lawyer, diplomat and retired politician who was the 27th premier of Quebec from 1996 to 2001.

Before his premiership in Quebec, he was a minister for two years in the Mulroney cabinet, Bouchard then founded and led the Bloc Québécois and became Leader of the Opposition in the House of Commons of Canada from 1993 to 1996. He became a central figure for the "Yes" side in the 1995 Quebec referendum, alongside Jacques Parizeau, whom he succeeded to serve as premier.

== Early life ==
Bouchard was born in Saint-Cœur-de-Marie, Québec, the son of Alice (née Simard) and Philippe Bouchard. His brother is the historian Gérard Bouchard. Lucien Bouchard graduated from Jonquière Classical College and obtained a bachelor's degree in social science and a law degree at Université Laval. He was called to the Bar of Quebec.

He practised law in Chicoutimi until 1985, while being given many charges as a public servant over the years: president of the arbitration committee for the education sector (1970 to 1976), prosecutor in chief for the commission for labour and industry (Cliche commission, 1974–75), and co-president of the study commission on the public and parapublic sectors (Martin-Bouchard commission — 1975). From then, he acted as a coordinator or member of many special teams on behalf of Quebec's government in the trade union negotiations for the public sector. In a 2000 interview with the journalist Michel Auger about his work with the Cliche commission, Bouchard named union boss André Desjardins one of the most toughest witnesses that he ever cross-examined.

== Early years in politics and diplomacy ==
Bouchard's relationship with politics is a complex one, as he affiliated himself over the years with various political parties with highly diverging ideologies, going as far as founding one, the Bloc Québécois.

Bouchard has been a Quebec nationalist during his entire political career. Contrary to popular belief, during the 1970 Quebec general election, he did not work for the federalist Quebec Liberal Party. He was deeply shaken by the events of Quebec's October Crisis, especially by Prime Minister Pierre Trudeau's imposition of the War Measures Act requested by then Quebec Premier Robert Bourassa.

Bouchard worked with the "Yes" side during the 1980 Quebec referendum on sovereignty. In 1984 Brian Mulroney, Bouchard's close friend from his law school days at Université Laval, became Canadian Prime Minister. Mulroney would go on to ask Bouchard to serve in various official capacities, including (in 1985) as Canadian ambassador to France.

== MP in the House of Commons ==
=== Cabinet Minister in the Mulroney Cabinet ===
In 1988, Bouchard returned to Canada to serve as Mulroney's Quebec lieutenant, and was elected as a Progressive Conservative from a Saguenay-area riding. He was immediately named to Cabinet as Secretary of State and later Minister of the Environment.

While still a strong Quebec nationalist, he believed that Mulroney's Meech Lake Accord was sufficient to placate nationalist feelings and keep Quebec in Confederation. However, after a commission headed by Jean Charest recommended some changes to the Accord, Bouchard opposed them, saying they diluted the original spirit and objectives of Meech. Mulroney rejected his reasoning.

=== Formation of the Bloc Québécois ===
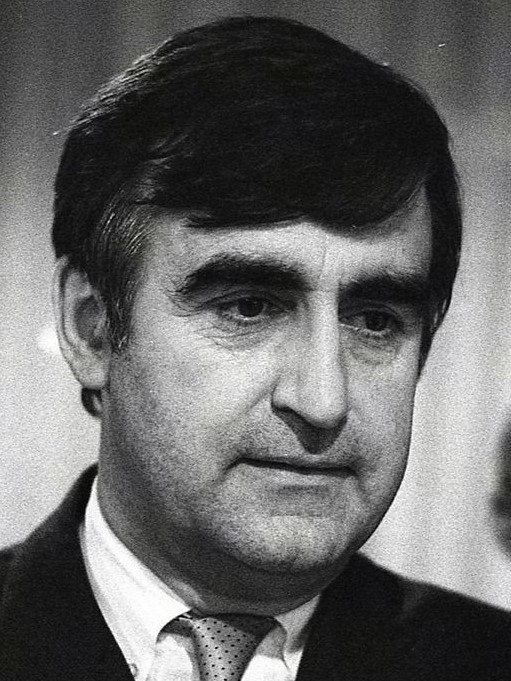
Bouchard in 1990

Soon afterward, Bouchard sent a message of support to the PQ, which was holding an anniversary meeting in his riding.

René Lévesque's memory will unite us all this weekend. He was the one who led Quebecers to realize they had the inalienable right to decide their own destiny.

When Mulroney learned about this, he called Bouchard into his office. Mulroney claims to have fired Bouchard, though Bouchard long publicly insisted that he had resigned rather than support what he saw as a betrayal of Meech. It turned out that Bouchard had cut a deal with PQ leader Jacques Parizeau in which Bouchard would declare his support for sovereignty; PQ leaders had told Bouchard that if Meech succeeded, it would mean the end of the PQ. Mulroney only learned of the deal when Parizeau revealed the plot in the early 2000s, and was angered to learn that Bouchard had "cooked up the deal with Parizeau while he was a member of my cabinet."

Years later, Mulroney told CTV News' Lloyd Robertson that he seriously considered sacking Bouchard when Bouchard supported Quebec's ban on English-language signs after promising Mulroney that he opposed them. In hindsight, Mulroney said, not firing Bouchard then was "a mistake." The two did not speak for years afterward, though they reconciled shortly before Mulroney's death in February 2024.

Bouchard resigned from the Progressive Conservatives soon afterward, and sat as an independent for a few months. After the failure of the Meech Lake Accord, Bouchard formed the sovereigntist Bloc Québécois with five former Tories and two former Liberals.

The PQ campaigned for the Bloc in the 1993 federal election in order to prepare Quebec for sovereignty, according to the Three Periods strategy devised by Parizeau. In this election, the Bloc Québécois won 54 out of 75 ridings in Quebec, including a near-sweep of the francophone ridings. Despite only running candidates in Quebec, its heavy concentration of support there was enough to give it the second-most seats in the House. Bouchard thus became the first separatist leader of the Opposition in the history of Canada.

=== Leader of the Opposition ===
Soon after the election, Bouchard discovered that most of the members of his large caucus could not speak English nearly well enough to use it in debate (although he and most of the Bloc's other founding members were fluently bilingual). More or less out of necessity, he announced that Bloc MPs would speak only French on the Commons floor, a policy that remains in place to this day. Since the Official Opposition has considerable advantages over the other parties not in government, Question Periods during the 35th Parliament were dominated by issues of Canadian unity.

However, Prime Minister Jean Chrétien regarded Reform leader Preston Manning as his main opponent on non-Quebec matters. For example, in 1995, when Bouchard garnered an invitation to meet visiting US President Bill Clinton by virtue of being Opposition Leader, Manning was also granted a meeting with Clinton in order to diffuse Bouchard's separatist leverage.

Bouchard was still serving in that capacity in Ottawa, and working closely with the provincial Parti Québécois to bring about the independence of Quebec, when he lost a leg to necrotizing fasciitis on December 1, 1994.

== 1995 referendum on sovereignty ==
In 1995, Bouchard signed, as Bloc leader, a tripartite agreement with Parti Québécois leader Jacques Parizeau and Action démocratique leader Mario Dumont, which mapped the way to the referendum on independence. He was instrumental in convincing Parizeau to include a plan of association with Canada in the referendum question. He campaigned with the other two leaders for the "Oui" side. Quebec premier Jacques Parizeau first led the "Oui" campaign but, as support for sovereignty began to plateau, Bouchard was given the official leadership. The referendum was extremely narrowly defeated by a majority vote of 50.58% to 49.42%.

Not long before the 1995 referendum, Bouchard drew considerable ire when he said on October 14, 1995, "We're one of the white races that has the fewest children." Liza Frulla, former Quebec culture minister commented, "We were shocked and hurt by Mr. Bouchard's various comments over the weekend. ... He is insulting our intelligence." The next week, on October 25, Bouchard's TV appeal following Prime Minister Jean Chrétien's televised address to the nation was likewise the subject of controversy. During his speech, Bouchard suddenly brandished a newspaper from the 1981 constitutional negotiations featuring a front-page photo of Pierre Trudeau and Chrétien together, laughing at a joke. Bouchard claimed they had been laughing at Quebec. In his autobiography of his years as prime minister, Chrétien describes the stunt as "absolutely the worst kind of demagoguery. It was the crudest stunt I had ever seen in Canadian politics."

== Premier of Quebec ==
After the Yes side lost the 1995 referendum, Parizeau resigned as Quebec premier. Bouchard was acclaimed his successor as leader of the Parti Québécois in January 1996, and was appointed premier of Quebec shortly afterward.

On the matter of sovereignty, while in office, he stated that no new referendum would be held, at least for the time being. In 2014, Bouchard revealed to Chantal Hébert that he had no plans calling for a referendum when becoming Premier.

A main concern of the Bouchard government, considered part of the necessary "conditions gagnantes" ("winning conditions" for the feasibility of a new referendum on sovereignty), was economic recovery through the achievement of "zero deficit". Long-term Keynesian policies resulting from the "Quebec model", developed by both PQ governments in the past and the previous Liberal government had left a substantial deficit in the provincial budget.

Bouchard led the PQ into the 1998 provincial election. He faced his former Cabinet colleague, Charest, who was now leader of the provincial Liberal Party. Although the Liberals won a narrow plurality of the popular vote, most of their margin was wasted on huge majorities in federalist areas of the province. As a result, the PQ suffered a net loss of only one seat, allowing it another term in government.

As Premier, Bouchard presided both over balanced budgets and a significant expansion of the province's social safety net with the implementation of a universal childcare system and pharmacare. During his time as Premier, Bouchard refused to grant provincial funding to the Montreal Expos for a new stadium, which would have played a major role in helping the Expos stay in Montreal. Bouchard said that he couldn't in good conscience authorize funding for a new sports facility when the province was being forced to shutter hospitals.

== Retirement ==
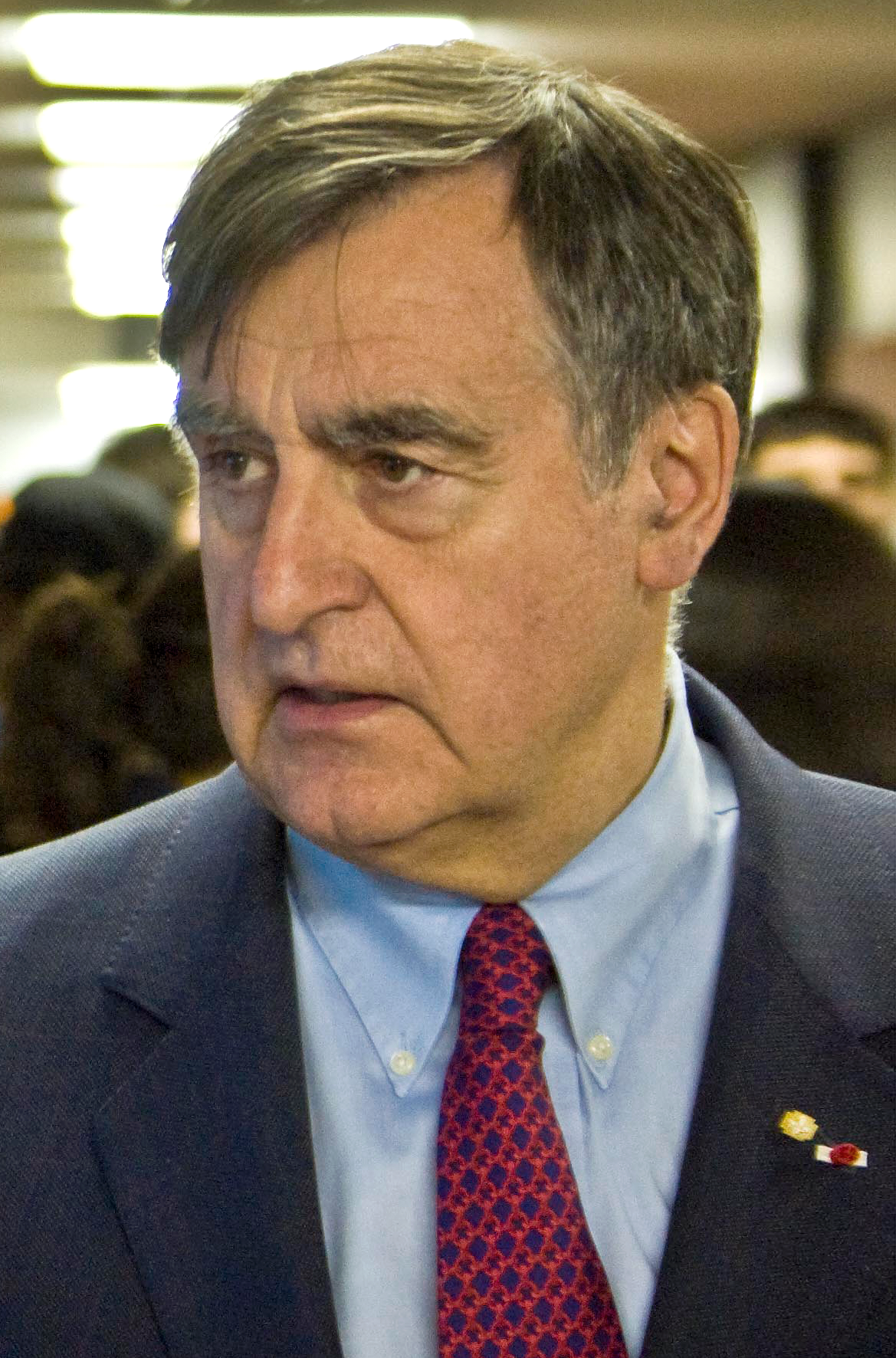
Bouchard in 2009

Bouchard retired from electoral politics in 2001, and was replaced as Quebec premier by Bernard Landry. He stated that his relative failure to revive the sovereigntist flame was a cause of his departure, something for which he took responsibility. Others have speculated that the Michaud Affair, regarding allegedly anti-Semitic comments by Parti Québécois candidate Yves Michaud, was another factor favouring Bouchard's departure.

He returned to practising law by becoming a partner at Davies Ward Phillips & Vineberg, where he specializes in commercial and corporate law. He serves as a negotiator, legal counsel and mediator in commercial matters and, occasionally, in labour-related disputes. He sits on the board of several private companies as well as organizations like the Montreal Symphony Orchestra, TC Transcontinental, Saputo Inc., Groupe BMTC and, until August 2021, TFI International. In April 2004, he helped launch the Centre for International Studies of the Université de Montréal (CÉRIUM), of which he is a board member. He served as President of the Quebec Oil and Gas Association from 2011 until 2013.

After retiring as premier, Bouchard avoided making public comments on politics until 2010, when he used a panel event celebrating the 100th anniversary of Montreal newspaper Le Devoir to argue that sovereignty was no longer a realistic goal for Quebec. Although he still considered himself a sovereigntist at heart, Bouchard argued that sovereignty did not offer any solutions for Quebec. He also accused the PQ of being so fixated on independence that it had no solutions for the province's basic needs, and also accused it of pandering to xenophobic elements by taking a hard line on immigration. In response, several sovereigntists, including PQ leader Pauline Marois, accused Bouchard of becoming one of the sovereigntist movement's many belle mères (idiomatically analogous to armchair quarterback).

Bouchard revealed in a 2014 documentary that the Bloc Québécois was only intended to last long enough to prepare the ground for the 1995 referendum. He believed its long duration weakened Quebec's influence within Canada by limiting the potential pool for federal cabinet ministers in successive Liberal and Conservative governments. He also averred that the 1995 referendum may have passed had it been part of a two-step process. In his view, there should have been a first referendum to give the government the authority to negotiate Quebec sovereignty with an economic and political partnership with Canada and a second to approve the results of negotiations. He blamed Parizeau's rejection of that approach for the referendum's failure.

== Personal life ==
Bouchard married his first wife, Jocelyne Côte, on October 15, 1966.

Following their divorce, Bouchard married his second wife, Audrey Best. Best was the Côte d'Azur-born and California-raised daughter of James Best, a U.S. Navy officer, and his French wife, Marie-Josée Massa. Best worked as a flight attendant, where she met Bouchard. She later became a lawyer, eventually working for the Heenan-Blaikie firm of Montreal. She died on January 25, 2011, aged 50, from breast cancer. Best had separated from Bouchard for several years before her death.

On May 18, 2013, Bouchard married his third wife, Solange Dugas.

Bouchard has two children, Alexandre and Simon, who hold dual Canadian-United States citizenship via Audrey Best, their mother.

In 1994, while serving as Leader of the Opposition, Bouchard lost his left leg to a type of flesh-eating bacteria.

== "Pour un Québec lucide" ==
On October 19, 2005, Bouchard and eleven other Quebecers of different backgrounds and political aspirations published a manifesto entitled "Pour un Québec lucide" ("For a clear-eyed vision of Quebec"). The manifesto warned Quebec's aging population about the challenges the future poses, demographically, economically and culturally. It made a certain impression on the Parti Québécois leadership race of 2005, getting mixed reactions. It was well received in other quarters, garnering praise on the editorial page of The Globe and Mail.

On October 16, 2006, Bouchard declared to TVA news reporter Paul Larocque, that the population of the province is not working enough and that it should be more productive in order to produce more resources for the population. He also added that his generation had contracted 75% of the province's current debt and that the future generations should not be handling the burden of paying for the previous ones.

== Legacy ==
Bouchard's government implemented some controversial policies, including cuts to the province's health care spending in order to balance the provincial budget, and the amalgamation of Quebec's larger cities undertaken by his successor Bernard Landry. Other aspects of his legacy include the creation of a low-cost, universal public daycare system, the implementation of a universal system of pharmacare, the birth of Emploi Québec, and achieving a balanced budget. He is remembered for his sometimes short fuse when provoked and his unforgiving demands for excellence in those he worked with, but also for his charm and eloquence, and was appreciated as a formidable foe by his political adversaries. Bouchard has stated that he will not return to politics.

== Elections as party leader ==
He won the 1998 election and resigned in 2001. Bouchard is the only PQ leader to be Premier of Quebec for his entire leadership and the only non-interim PQ leader to never lose an election.

== Honours ==
- Member of the Queen's Privy Council for Canada March 31, 1988.
- On April 7, 2000, Lucien Bouchard received a Doctorate Honoris causa of Law from the Lumière University Lyon 2.
- Queen Elizabeth II Golden Jubilee Medal (2002)
- Commander of the Legion of Honour (2002)
- On October 5, 2006, Lucien Bouchard received a second Doctorate Honoris causa of Law, this time from the Law Faculty of the Université de Montréal.
- On April 27, 2007, Lucien Bouchard received a third Doctorate Honoris causa from the Université du Québec à Chicoutimi (UQAC).
- Grand Commander of the National Order of Quebec (2008)
- Queen Elizabeth II Diamond Jubilee Medal (2012)

== See also ==
- List of Quebec premiers
- Nicknames of Quebec premiers
- Quebec sovereignty movement
- History of Quebec
- Politics of Quebec
- Politics of Canada

== Sources ==
- Hébert, Chantal (2014). The Morning After: The 1995 Referendum and the Day that Almost Was. With Jean Lapierre. Toronto: Alfred A Knopf Canada. ISBN 978-0-345-80762-5.
- Martin, Lawrence (1997). The antagonist : a biography of Lucien Bouchard. Toronto: Viking. ISBN 067087437X.
- Vastel, Michel (1996). Lucien Bouchard : en attendant la suite (in French). Outremont, Qc: Lanctôt Editeur. ISBN 2894850093.
