= Aline Saint-Amand =

Canadian politician

Aline Saint-Amand (born June 16, 1936) is a former Canadian politician in Quebec. She represented Jonquière in the National Assembly of Quebec from 1983 to 1985 as a Liberal.

== Life ==
The daughter of William Boily and Lorraine (Irène) Dutil, she was born Aline Boily in Kénogami (now Saguenay, Quebec). She was educated at the convent of the Sisters of Notre-Dame du Bon-Conseil. She worked as a secretary and then as a proof editor for Éditions du Réveil from 1974 to 1983. In 1981 and 1982, she was vice-president of the union for workers at Éditions du Réveil.

She was a member of the board of directors for the community legal centre for Saguenay–Lac-Saint-Jean. Saint-Amand was vice-president and president for the Club culturel et humanitaire Châtelaine de Jonquière and was founding president of the Fondation Châtelaine at Jonquière.

She was elected to the Quebec assembly in a by-election held in 1983 but was defeated when she ran for reelection in 1985 and 1989. She worked as an advisor in the offices of various Quebec cabinet ministers from 1986 to 1992. She was assistant chair for the Quebec Commission des normes du travail from 1993 until she retired in 1998.

From 1998 to 2002, she served on the board of directors for the Orchestre Symphonique de Québec. In 2003, she became a member of the board of directors for the Orchestre Symphonique du Saguenay-Lac-Saint-Jean, becoming assistant chair in 2004.

She married Ghislain Saint-Amand; he died in 2005.
