= Jean-Guy Rodrigue =

Canadian politician (1981–1985)

Member of the National Assembly of Quebec for Vimont
- In office 1981–1985
- Preceded by: Constituency established
- Succeeded by: Jean-Paul Théorêt

Personal details
- Born: March 21, 1937 Granby, Quebec, Canada
- Died: January 6, 2013 (aged 75) Laval, Quebec, Canada
- Party: Parti Québécois
- Education: Université de Montréal
- Occupation: Engineer, trade unionist, politician

Jean-Guy Rodrigue (March 21, 1937 – January 6, 2013) was a Canadian engineer, trade unionist and politician from Quebec. He represented Vimont in the National Assembly of Quebec as a member of the Parti Québécois from 1981 to 1985 and briefly served as a cabinet minister under René Lévesque and Pierre Marc Johnson.

== Biography ==
Rodrigue was born in Granby to Hermann Rodrigue and Estelle Beauregard. He studied civil engineering at the University of Montreal; and joined Hydro-Québec after graduating in 1960. He helped establish the Syndicat professionnel des ingénieurs d'Hydro-Québec (SPIHQ), becoming its first president in 1964.

In May 1965, the SPIHQ organized a strike to secure recognition as the bargaining representative for all of Hydro-Québec's engineers. Management sought to exclude half of the company's 572 engineers from the bargaining unit. The month-long strike ended in a compromise under where the union would represent 442 engineers

From 1969 to 1976, Rodrigue served as president of the Fédération des ingénieurs et cadres du Québec, affiliated with the Confédération des syndicats nationaux (CSN). He subsequently returned to Hydro-Québec, where he oversaw studies of river development in the Lower North Shore region from 1979 to 1981. He entered politics as a Parti Québécois candidate and was elected to represent Vimont in the 1981 election. From 1982 to 1984, he served as parliamentary assistant to the minister of transport. He became minister of energy and resources in the Lévesque government and briefly served as minister of higher education, science and technology in the government of Pierre Marc Johnson.. He was defeated by Liberal candidate Jean-Paul Théorêt in the 1985 general election.

Rodrigue returned to Hydro-Québec as an international affairs adviser in the office of the vice-president responsible for equipment. He also advised the government of Ivory Coast. After retiring in 1991, he studied at the University of Salamanca in Spain. He served as Quebec's delegate in Caracas in 1995 and 1996

Assembly seats
New constituency	Member of the National Assembly of Quebec for Vimont; 1981–1985	Succeeded by Jean-Paul Théorêt
