= Le Saguenay-et-son-Fjord =

- Census division
- Interactive map of Le Saguenay-et-son-Fjord
- Coordinates: 48°27′N 70°54′W
- Country: Canada
- Province: Quebec
- Region: Saguenay–Lac-Saint-Jean

Area
  - Land: 41,361.06 km^{2} (15,969.59 sq mi)

Population (2016)
  - Total: 167,549
  - Density: 4.1/km^{2} (11/sq mi)
  - Change (2011–16): ▲1.4%
  - Dwellings: 81,769
- Time zone: UTC−5 (EST)
  - Summer (DST): UTC−4 (EDT)
- Area codes: 418 and 581

Le Saguenay-et-son-Fjord (Saguenay and its Fjord) is a census division (CD) of Quebec, with geographical code 94.

It consists of the Le Fjord-du-Saguenay Regional County Municipality and the territory equivalent to a regional county municipality (TE) of Saguenay (which is a city and also a census subdivision).

Prior to February 18, 2002, the separate municipalities that were amalgamated into the current city of Saguenay were all part of Le Fjord-du-Saguenay Regional County Municipality. The territory of the pre-2002 Le Fjord-du-Saguenay regional county municipality corresponded exactly to that of Le Saguenay-et-son-Fjord census division.
