= Arthabaska County, Quebec =

Coordinates: 46°00′N 72°00′W

Arthabaska County (French: Comté d'Arthabaska, pronounced [kɔ̃te daʁtabaska]) is an historical county founded in 1855 in central Quebec, Canada. Its county seat was Arthabaska and the main city was Victoriaville. It was bounded on the northeast by Mégantic County on the southeast Wolfe County, on the southwest by Drummond County and Richmond County and on the northwest by Nicolet County. It was formed from the townships of Warwick, Standold, Arthabaska, Chester-Est, Chester-Ouest and Tingwick, as well as part of the townships of Maddington, Blandford, Horton, Bulstrode, Simpson, and Aston.

In the early 1980s Quebec's counties were abolished and most of Arthabaska County became the Arthabaska Regional County Municipality. The northeastern part of the county was transferred to L'Érable Regional County Municipality.

The name of the county comes from the name of the township of Arthabaska, itself originating from the Cree language, in which it means "where there are reeds".

== Municipalities within the county ==
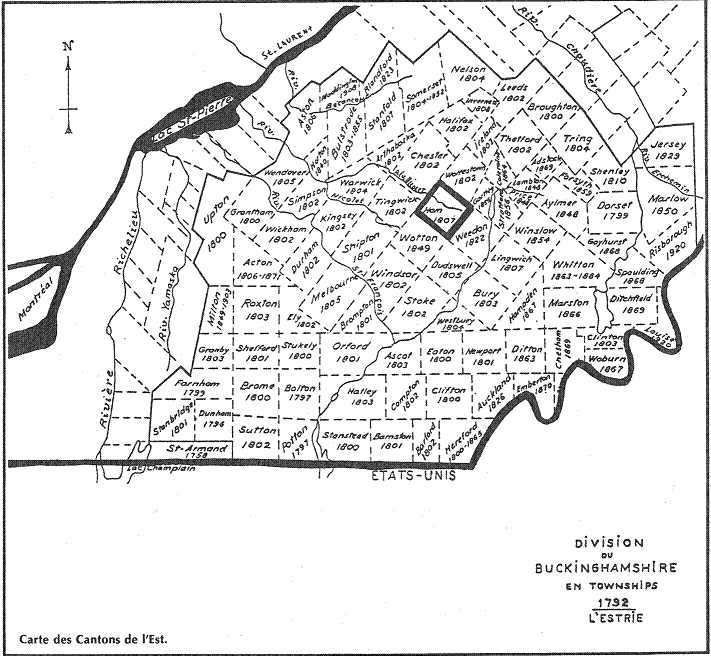
Map of the townships of the east, including those Arthabaska County was formed from

- Arthabaska (fusioned with Victoriaville in 1994)
- Chénier (fusioned with Tingwick in 1981)
- Chester-Est (renamed Sainte-Hélène-de-Chester in 2008)
- Chester-Nord (fusioned with Saint-Norbert-d'Arthabaska in 1994)
- Chester-Ouest (fusioned with Chesterville in 1982)
- Chesterville
- Daveluyville
- Maddington Falls
- Princeville
- Parish of Princeville, named Saint-Eusèbe-de-Stanfold until 1969, fusioned with Princeville in 2000
- Saint-Albert
- Saint-Christophe-d'Arthabaska
- Sainte-Anne-du-Sault (merged with Daveluyville in 2016)
- Sainte-Clotilde-de-Horton
- Sainte-Élizabeth-de-Warwick
- Sainte-Séraphine
- Sainte-Victoire-d'Arthabaska (fusioned with Victoriaville in 1994)
- Saint-Louis-de-Blandford
- Saint-Norbert-d'Arthabaska
- Saint-Rémi-de-Tingwick
- Saint-Samuel
- Saint-Valérien
- Tingwick
- Victoriaville
- Warwick
