= Rivière des Rosiers =

River in Centre-du-Québec, Quebec (Canada)

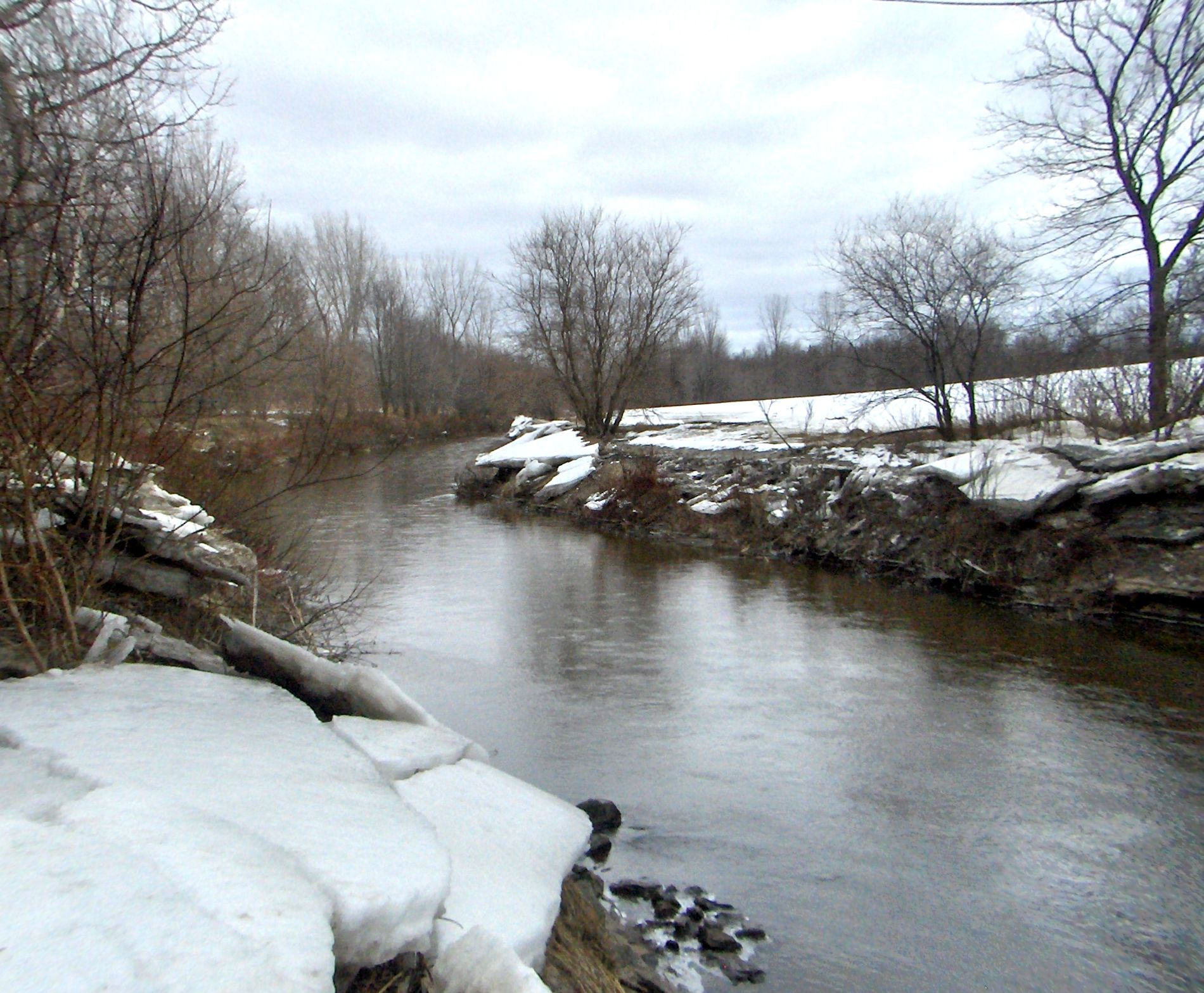
- The Desrosiers river in Saint-Albert

- Location within Quebec

Location
- Country: Canada
- Province: Quebec
- Region: Centre-du-Québec
- MRC: Arthabaska Regional County Municipality
- Municipality: Tingwick, Kingsey Falls, Warwick, Sainte-Élizabeth-de-Warwick et de Saint-Albert-de-Warwick

Physical characteristics
- Source: La Montagne (Appalachian Mountains)
  - location: Tingwick
  - coordinates: 45.873774°N 71.869054°W
  - elevation: 360 m (1,180 ft)
- Mouth: Nicolet River
  - location: Saint-Albert
  - coordinates: 45.98667°N 72.12111°W
  - elevation: 103 m (338 ft)
- Length: 35 km (22 mi)

Basin features
- Tributaries
  - left: (upstream)
  - right: (upstream)

The rivière des Rosiers (in English: River of Roses) is a tributary of the Nicolet River which flows on the south shore of the St. Lawrence River. The Rosiers River flows through the municipalities of Tingwick, Kingsey Falls, Warwick, Sainte-Élizabeth-de-Warwick and Saint-Albert-de-Warwick, in the Arthabaska Regional County Municipality (MRC), in the Centre-du-Québec region, in Quebec, in Canada.

== Toponymy ==
The toponym "rivière des Rosiers" was made official on December 5, 1968, at the Commission de toponymie du Québec.

== Geography ==
=== Territory ===
The "rivière des Rosiers" watershed affects six municipalities, namely (from upstream to downstream) Saint-Rémi-de-Tingwick, Tingwick, Kingsey Falls, Warwick, Sainte-Élizabeth-de-Warwick and Saint-Albert.

=== Course ===
The Rosiers River begins its course from 35 kilometres (22 mi) at Tingwick at an altitude of 360 metres (1,180 ft) at the foot of the Mountain, in the Appalachian Mountains. It then flows in a northwesterly direction to empty into the Nicolet River at Saint-Albert at an altitude of 103 metres (338 ft). The downstream portion of the river (length of 16 kilometres (9.9 mi)) was channeled at the beginning of the 20th century.

=== Hydrology ===
The watershed of the river has an area of 140 kilometres (86.99 mi). The basin includes 112 hectares (280 acres) of wetlands.

== Natural environment ==
The main forest species are sugar maple (Acer saccharum) and red maple (Acer rubrum).

There are twelve species of fishes in the river. The main species are horned mullet (Semotilus atromaculatus), black sucker (Catostomus commersoni), belly-rotten (Pimephales notatus) and the Redfin Shiner (Luxilus cornutus).

There are 39 species of birds from 16 distinct families along the banks of the river. There are, among others, several species of buntings, warblers, swallows, tyrants, vireos, thrushes, and some representatives of corvids, such as the raven and the blue jay.

== See also ==
- List of rivers of Quebec

== Sources ==
- Fort, Raphaël (2010). Portrait du bassin versant de la rivière Desrosiers (PDF) (in French). Corporation pour la promotion de l’environnement de la rivière Nicolet.
