= Rivière des Pins (Nicolet River tributary) =

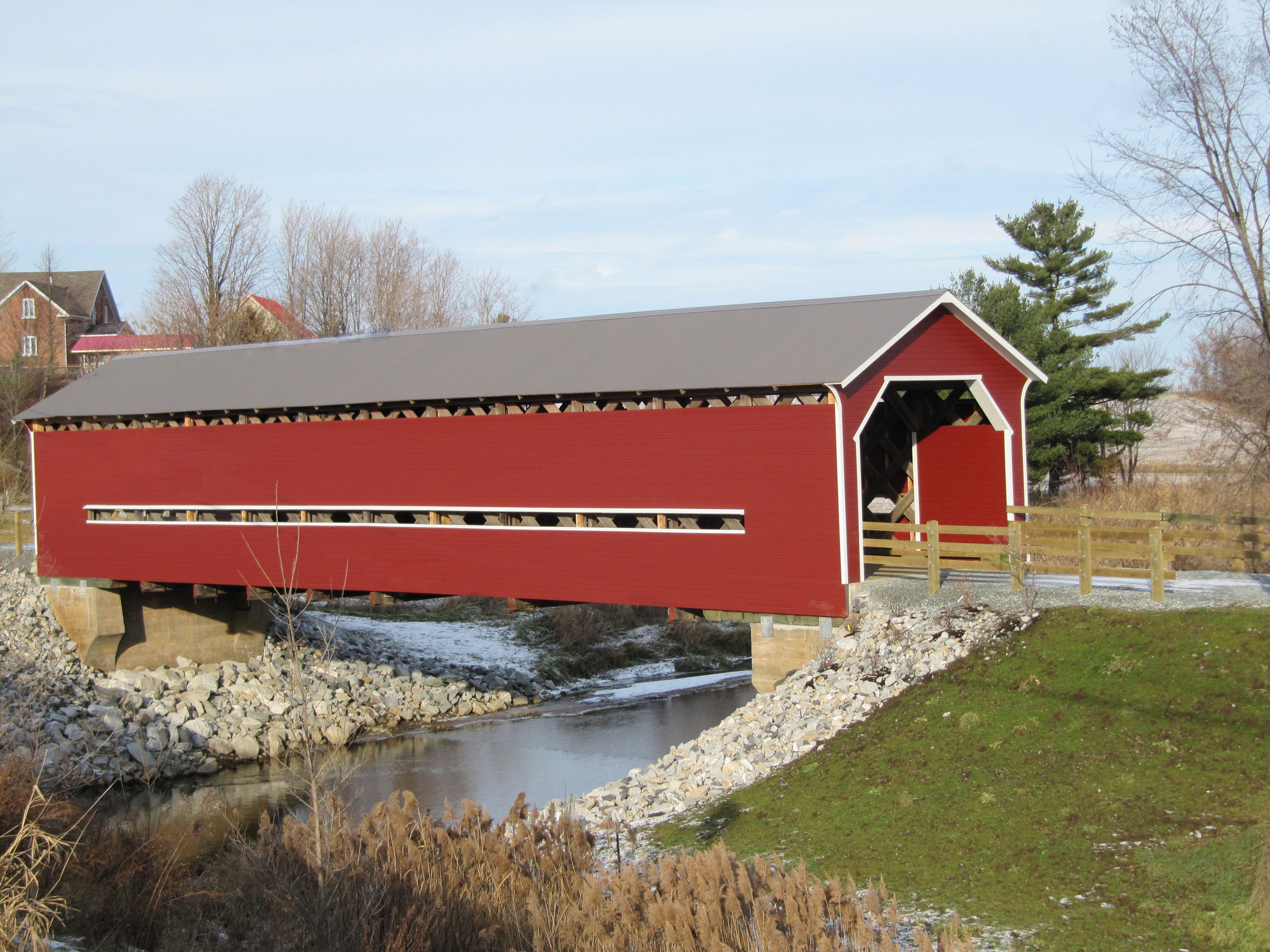
- Rivière des Pins near Joseph-Édouard Perrault Bridge

- Location within Quebec

Location
- Country: Canada
- Province: Quebec
- Region: Centre-du-Québec
- Regional County Municipality: Arthabaska

Physical characteristics
- Source: Mountain streams
  - location: Saint-Rémi-de-Tingwick
  - coordinates: 45°54′37″N 71°50′02″W
  - elevation: 296 m (971 ft)
- Mouth: Nicolet River
  - location: Saint-Albert-de-Warwick
  - coordinates: 46.00806°N 72.04333°W
  - elevation: 108 m (354 ft)
- Length: 37.9 km (23.5 mi)

Basin features
- Tributaries
  - left: (upstream): Lemay stream; Desrochers stream
  - right: (upstream): black stream; Laroche stream; Perreault stream; Verville stream; Hince stream

The Rivière des Pins (English: River of the Pines) is a tributary of the Nicolet River which flows on the south bank of the Saint Lawrence River. The Pins River flows through the municipalities of Saint-Rémi-de-Tingwick, Tingwick, Warwick and Saint-Albert-de-Warwick, in the regional county municipality (MRC) of Arthabaska, in the region of Centre-du-Québec, in Quebec, in Canada.

== Geography ==
The main hydrographic slopes neighboring the "Rivière des Pins" are:

- north side: Nicolet River;
- east side Noir Noir stream, Nicolet River;
- south side Des Desrochers stream, rivière des Rosiers, Truite stream;
- west side: Nicolet River South-West, rivière des Rosiers.

The "Rivière des Pins" originates from several agricultural and forestry streams in the municipality of Saint-Rémi-de-Tingwick. This area is located to the northwest of the route from range 8th and 9th.

From its head zone, the Rivière des Pins flows over 37.9 kilometres (23.5 mi) according to the following segments:

- 4.2 kilometres (2.6 mi) south-east, then west, to the municipal limit of Tingwick;
- 2.3 kilometres (1.4 mi) north-west, up to the route du 6th rang;
- 3.8 kilometres (2.4 mi) north-west, up to Chemin Craig;
- 2.7 kilometres (1.7 mi) north-west, up to Gleasson Road;
- 3.0 kilometres (1.9 mi) north-west, up to the municipal limit of Warwick;
- 5.6 kilometres (3.5 mi) south-west, up to the Chemin de Warwick bridge, located south-east of the village of Warwick;
- 5.6 kilometres (3.5 mi) to the west, bypassing the village of Warwick to the south, to the Chemin de Warwick bridge (located northwest of the village );
- 3.4 kilometres (2.1 mi) north-west, up to the confluence of the Laroche stream (coming from the east);
- 7.3 kilometres (4.5 mi) towards the north-west, to its mouth.

The "Rivière des Pins" flows into a bend on the south bank of the Nicolet River at 3.8 kilometres (2.4 mi) upstream from the bridge of the village of Saint-Albert-de-Warwick and 5.1 kilometres (3.2 mi) downstream from the 10e rang West bridge, in the heart of the city of Victoriaville.

== Toponymy ==
The toponym "Rivière des Pins" was formalized on December 5, 1968 at the Commission de toponymie du Québec.

== See also ==
- List of rivers of Quebec
