= Rivière des Vases (Nicolet River tributary) =

River in Centre-du-Québec, Quebec (Canada)

Location
- Country: Canada
- Province: Quebec
- Region: Centre-du-Québec
- Regional County Municipality: Arthabaska

Physical characteristics
- Source: La Montagne (Appalachian Mountains)
  - location: Ham-Nord
  - coordinates: 45°51′22″N 71°37′01″W
  - elevation: 336 m (1,102 ft)
- Mouth: Nicolet River
  - location: Ham-Nord
  - coordinates: 45.88667°N 71.69666°W
  - elevation: 173 m (568 ft)
- Length: 12.9 km (8.0 mi)

Basin features
- Progression: Nicolet River, St. Lawrence River
- Tributaries
  - left: (upstream) ruisseau Demers, ruisseau Grimard, ruisseau Guertin, ruisseau Richer
  - right: (upstream)

The rivière des Vases (in English: river of vases) is a tributary of the Nicolet River which empties on the south shore of the St. Lawrence River. The Rivière des Vases flows through the municipalities of Ham-Nord and Saints-Martyrs-Canadiens, in the regional county municipality (MRC) of Arthabaska Regional County Municipality, in the region from Centre-du-Québec, to Quebec, to Canada.

== Geography ==
The neighboring hydrographic slopes of the Vases river are:

- north side: Bulstrode River;
- east side: Blanche River;
- south side: Aunière stream, lake Nicolet;
- west side: Nicolet River.

The "rivière des Vases" has its source north of "La Montagne" in the township municipality of Ham-Nord, almost at the limit of the municipality of Saints-Martyrs-Canadiens.

From its source, the "Rivière des Vases", the river flows over 12.9 kilometres (8.0 mi) in the following segments:

- 0.2 kilometres (0.12 mi) eastward, up to the limit of the municipality of Saints-Martyrs-Canadiens;
- 2.2 kilometres (1.4 mi) first east, then north, crossing the municipality of Saints-Martyrs-Canadiens, to the limit of Ham-Nord;
- 2.5 kilometres (1.6 mi) west, in Ham-Nord, to the confluence of the Grimard stream (coming from the north);
- 3.8 kilometres (2.4 mi) westward, to the route 161 bridge;
- 4.2 kilometres (2.6 mi) towards the west, until its mouth.

The Rivière des Vases flows on the east bank of the Nicolet River in Ham-Nord, downstream from the hamlet "village-des-Chutes" and upstream from the hamlet "Notre-Dame-de- Ham".

== Toponymy ==
The hydronym "Rivière des Vases" originates from a zone of mud near the confluence of the Demers stream and the "Rivière des Vases".

The term vase refers to the siltation of a place by:

- a silt which consists of a sediment composed of very fine earthy particles and organic matter found at the bottom of water tables and streams (ponds, lakes, rivers and others);
- mud which constitutes a soil soaked by water (e.g.: during floods, spring thaws or heavy rains) making it difficult to drive or slippery roads or paths that are not stony or rocky.

The toponym "rivière des Vases" was made official on December 5, 1968, at the Commission de toponymie du Québec.

== See also ==
- List of rivers of Quebec
