= Petite rivière à Monfette =

River in Centre-du-Québec, Quebec (Canada)

Location
- Country: Canada
- Province: Quebec
- Region: Centre-du-Québec
- Regional County Municipality: Arthabaska Regional County Municipality

Physical characteristics
- Source: Mountain streams
  - location: Saint-Rémi-de-Tingwick
  - coordinates: 45°51′12″N 71°51′26″W
  - elevation: 338 m (1,109 ft)
- Mouth: Nicolet Southwest River
  - location: Saint-Rémi-de-Tingwick
  - coordinates: 45.80389°N 71.8875°W
  - elevation: 163 m (535 ft)
- Length: 7.9 km (4.9 mi)

Basin features
- Progression: Nicolet Southwest River, Nicolet River, St. Lawrence River
- Tributaries
  - left: (upstream)
  - right: (upstream)

The Petite rivière à Monfette (in English: Little river at Monfette) is a tributary on the north bank of the Nicolet Southwest River (Les Trois Lacs (Les Sources). It flows into the municipality of Saint-Rémi-de-Tingwick, in the Arthabaska Regional County Municipality (MRC), in the administrative region of Centre-du-Québec, in Quebec, in Canada.

== Geography ==
The "Petite rivière à Monfette" has its source at the confluence of two streams on the southern flank of the mount "La Montagne" in Saint-Rémi-de-Tingwick. This spring is located 3.0 kilometres (1.9 mi) southwest of the center of the village of Saint-Rémi-de-Tingwick and 2.3 kilometres (1.4 mi) northwest of the hamlet of Coin-de-la-Petite-Mine.

From its source, the Petite rivière à Monfette descends on 7.9 kilometres (4.9 mi) generally towards the south, with a drop of 175 metres (574 ft). From its source, the course of the river descends the mountain towards the south to the confluence (altitude: 260 m) of a stream (coming from the northeast, or from the hamlet of Coin-de-la-Petite-Mine), then continue down the mountain to the north shore of the lake Les Trois Lacs (Les Sources), either in the hamlet of La Petite-Venise and opposite the hamlet of Le Cap-de-Roche (located on the south shore of the lake).

The Les Trois Lacs (Les Sources) is crossed to the west by the Nicolet Southwest River.

== Toponymy ==
The term "Monfette" turns out to be a family name of French origin.

The toponym "Petite rivière à Monfette" was made official on September 5, 1985, at the Commission de toponymie du Québec.

== See also ==
- List of rivers of Quebec
