= Joseph-Édouard Perrault Bridge =

Joseph-Édouard-Perrault bridge
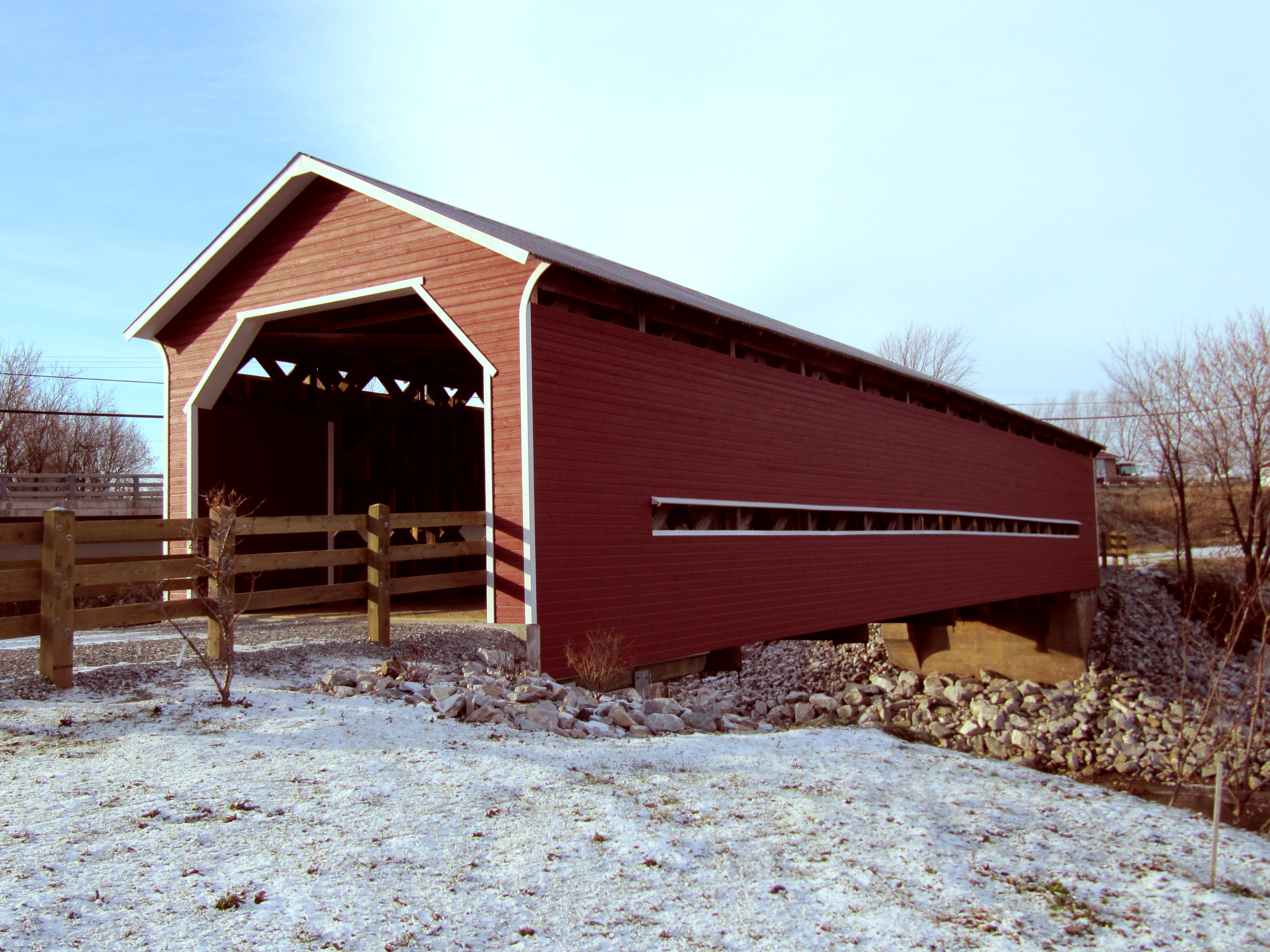
- Covered bridge spanning the "Rivière des Pins" at Warwick
- Coordinates: 45.956250°N 72.006583°W
- Crosses: Rivière des Pins
- Locale: Warwick, Quebec, Canada

Characteristics
- Total length: 30.2 metres (99 ft)

The Joseph-Édouard-Perrault bridge, formerly known as the Pont Perrault-Charbonneau, is a covered bridge located at Warwick, Quebec, Canada. Built in 1908, it was used for automobile traffic until 1957. It was classified historical monument in 1999.

== History ==
Acquired by the Municipality of Warwick in 1998, the bridge was completely renovated in 2011. The bridge was re-opened on September 26, 2011. following an investment of $340,000.

== Gallery ==
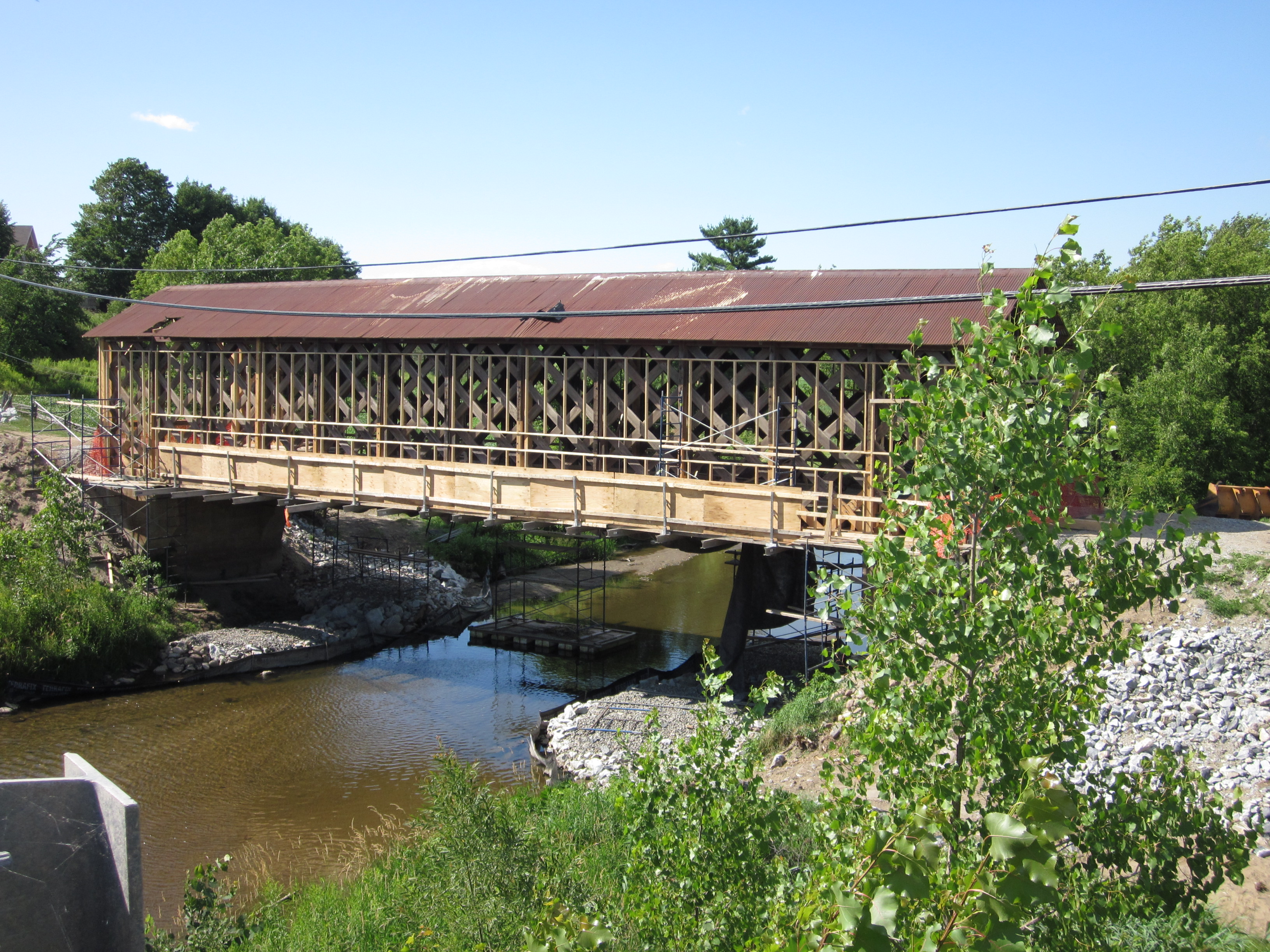
Rénovations, July 2011

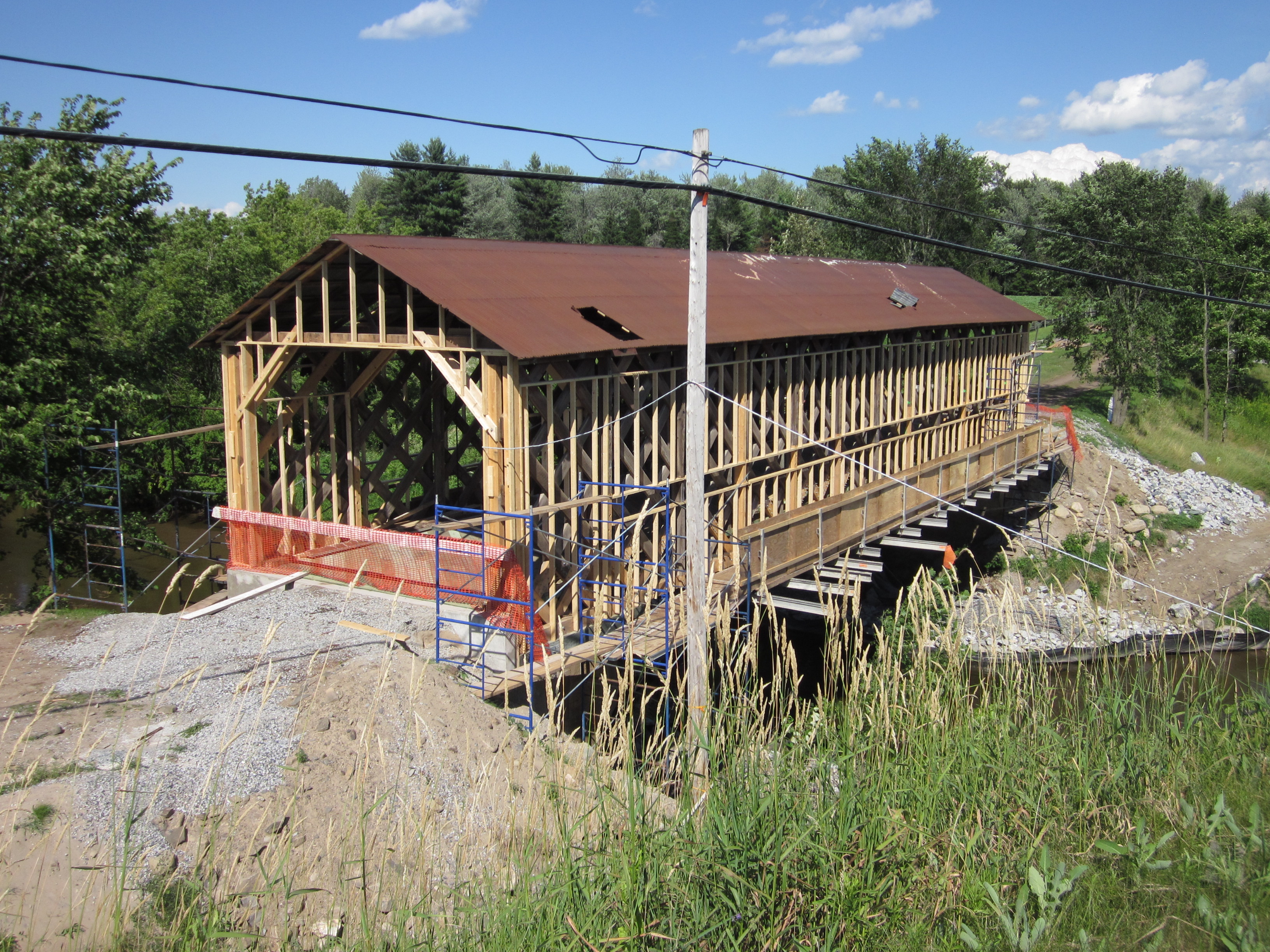
Rénovations, July 2011

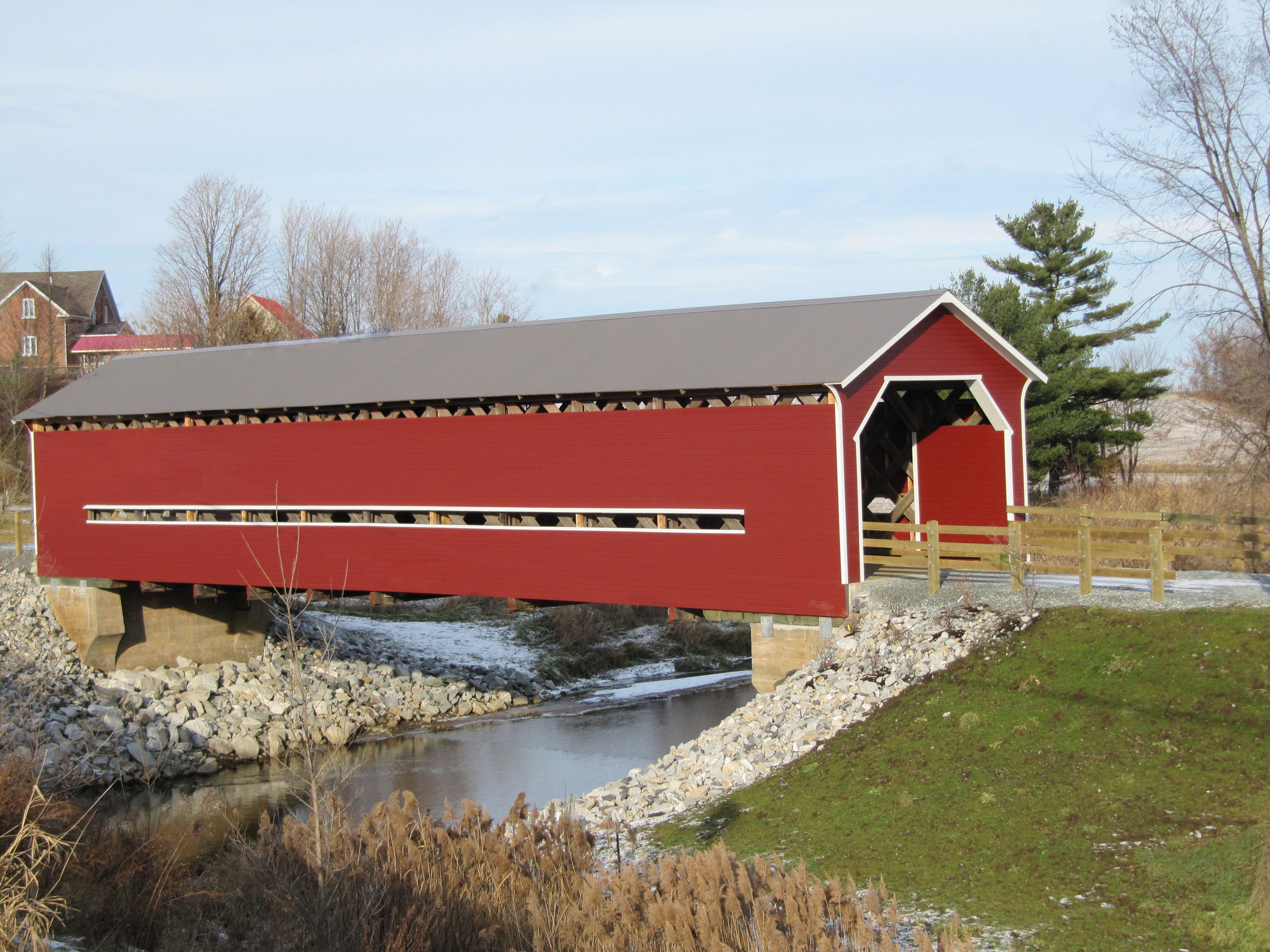
December 2011

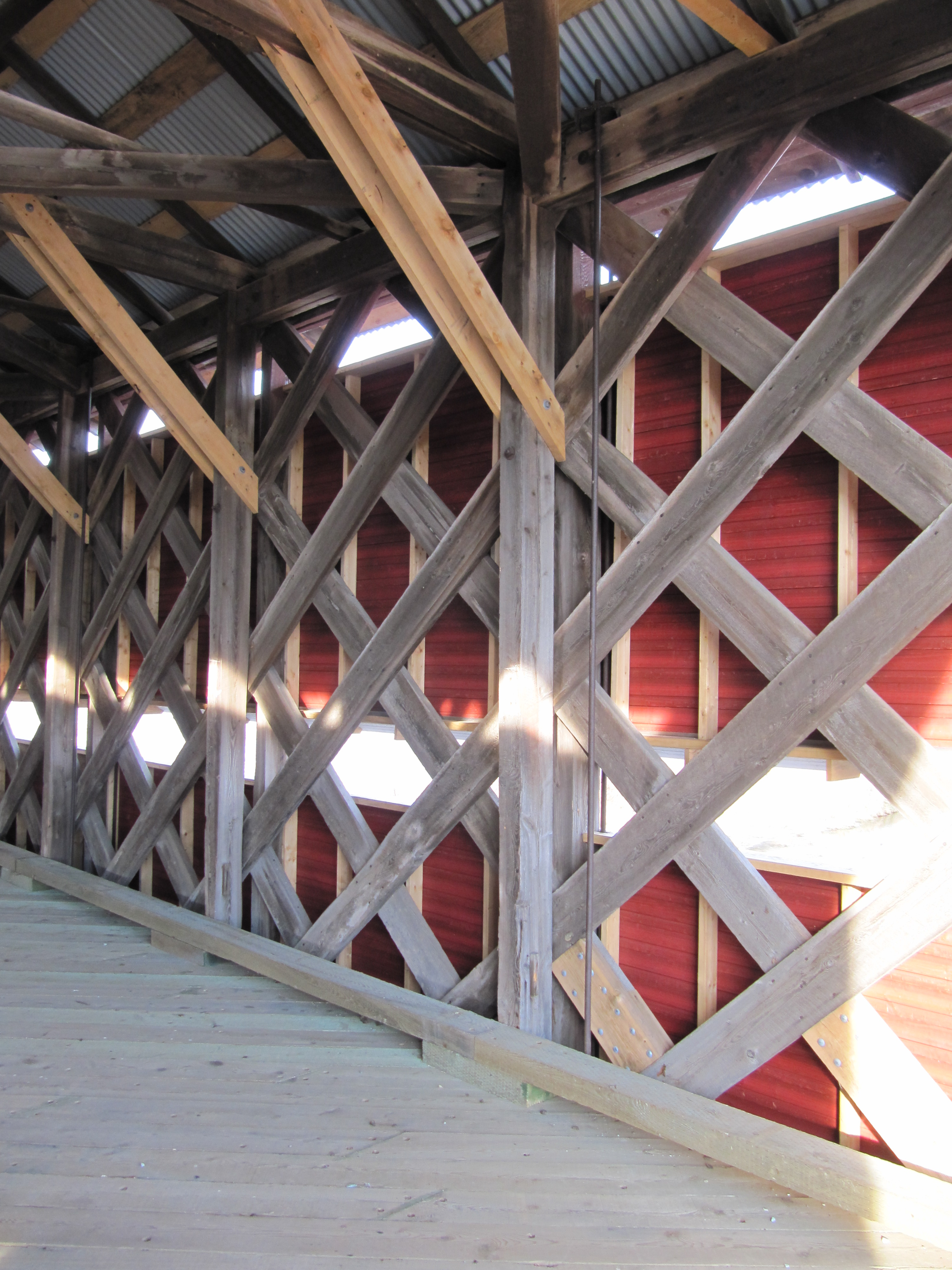
December 2011

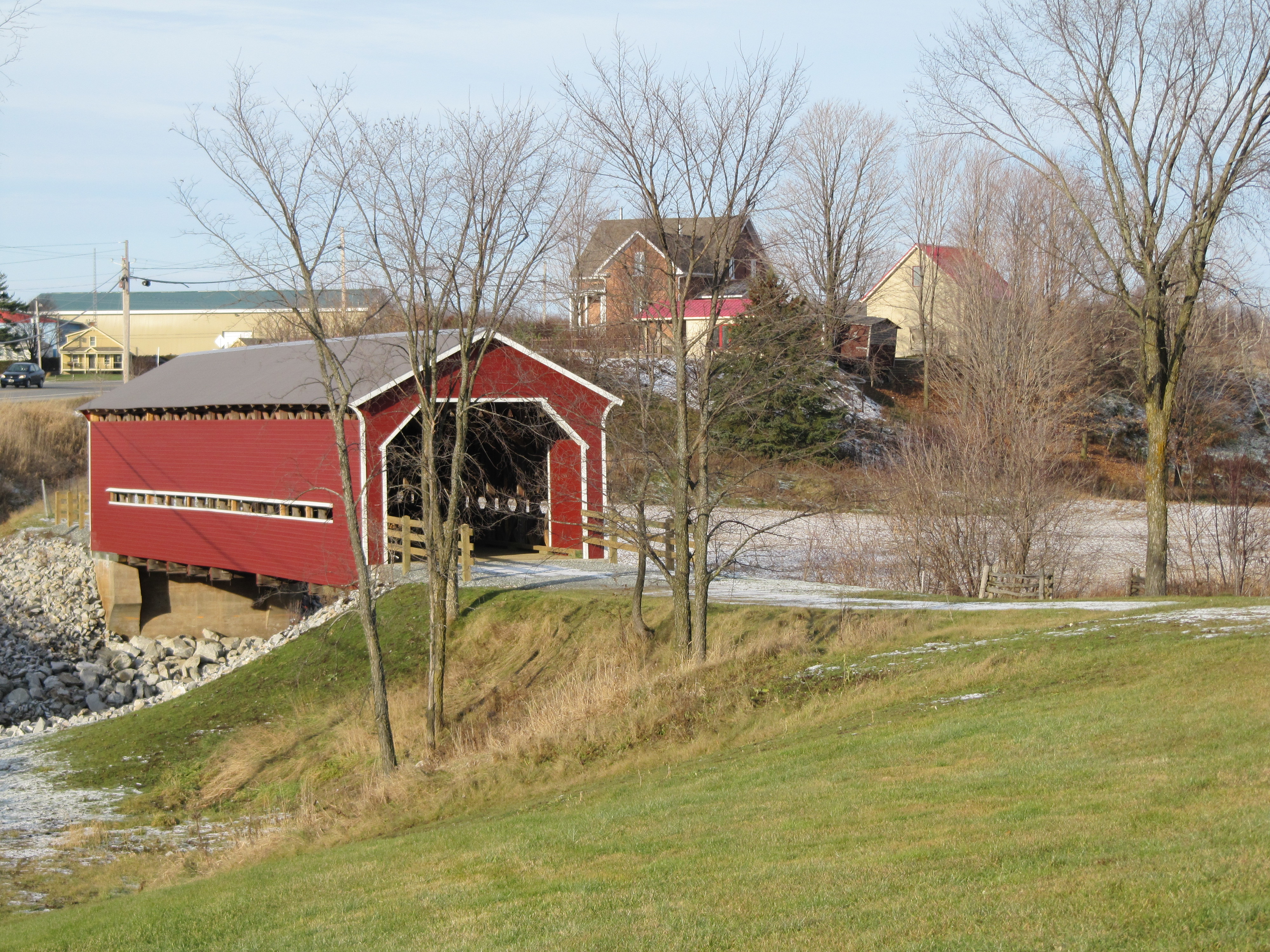
December 2011
