= Mauricie–Bois-Francs =

Quebecois administrative unit

Coordinates: 46°23′N 72°26′W

Mauricie–Bois-Francs (French pronunciation: [mɔʁisi bwa fʁɑ̃]) was a former administrative region of Quebec. It was created in 1966 along with the other nine original administrative regions of Quebec. It ceased to exist on July 30, 1997 (or August 20, 1997, upon publication in the Gazette officielle du Québec) when it was split into the modern-day administrative regions of Mauricie and Centre-du-Québec.

It consisted of the following regional county municipalities:

- Francheville
- Le Centre-de-la-Mauricie
- Le Haut-Saint-Maurice
- Maskinongé
- Mékinac

which became part of Mauricie, and:

- Arthabaska
- Bécancour
- Drummond
- L'Érable
- Nicolet-Yamaska

which became part of Centre-du-Québec.
