= Lake Nicolet =

Lake in Centre-du-Québec, Quebec (Canada)

- Lac Nicolet (French)
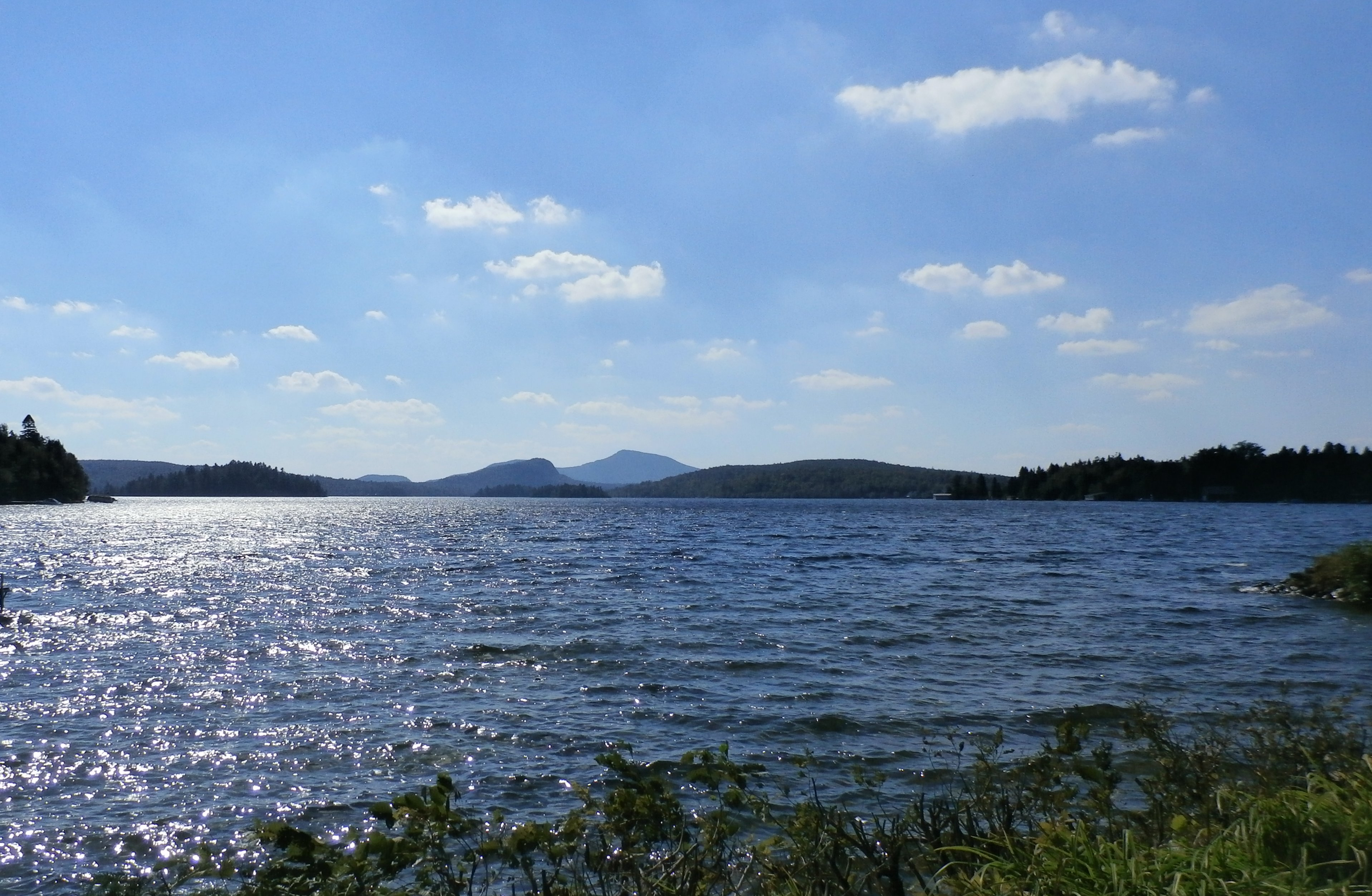
- Lake Nicolet seen from Gosford street, near Saints-Martyrs-Canadiens

- Location within Quebec
- Location: Canada, Quebec, Centre-du-Québec, Arthabaska Regional County Municipality
- Coordinates: 45.83°N 71.56028°W
- Primary outflows: Nicolet River
- Catchment area: 9.4 kilometres (5.84 mi)
- Max. length: 5.1 kilometres (3.2 mi)
- Max. width: 1.7 kilometres (1.1 mi)
- Surface area: 4.1 kilometres (2.55 mi)
- Average depth: 17 metres (56 ft)
- Max. depth: 41 metres (135 ft)
- Surface elevation: 350 metres (1,150 ft)
- Frozen: Mid December to end of April
- Islands: Boulanger, Linke, L'Heureux, Baril, Michel-Rheault, Rolland.

Lake Nicolet (in French: lac Nicolet) is located 50 km south of Victoriaville, in the municipality of Saints-Martyrs-Canadiens, in Arthabaska Regional County Municipality (MRC), in administrative region of Centre-du-Québec, Canada.

Lake Nicolet is the source of the Nicolet River which flows 137 kilometres (85 mi) to the southeast shore of lake Saint-Pierre, in Nicolet. The latest is crossed through the North-East by the St. Lawrence River.

This lake is surrounded by Chemin du Lac-Nicolet (north-west side) and Chemin Gosford-Sud (south-east side).

The lake takes its name from Jean Nicolet (1598 - 1642), a French explorer at the time of New France who is known to have been the first European to explore Lake Michigan.

== Geography ==
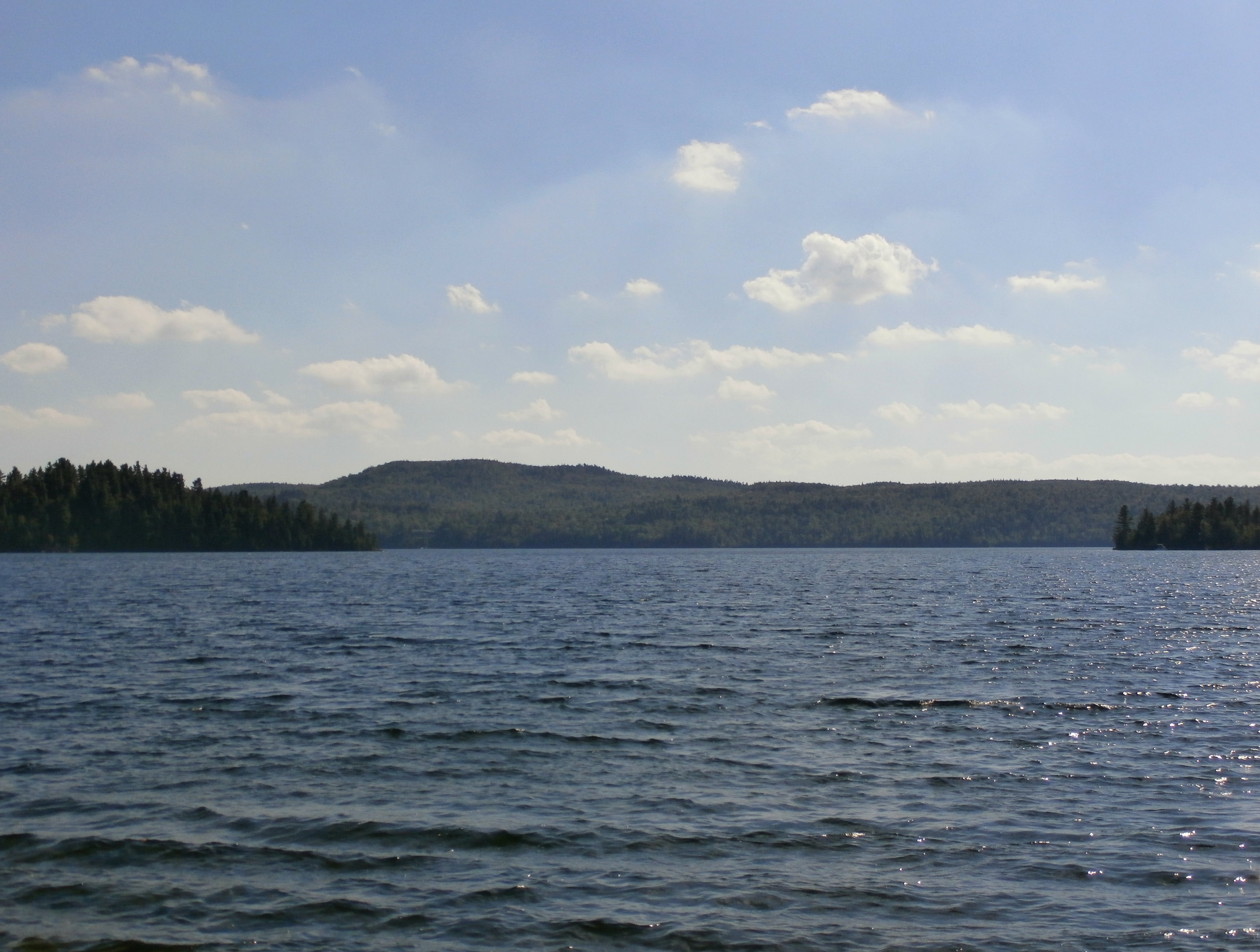
Lac Nicolet seen from the public wharf in the village of Saints-Martyrs-Canadiens

Lake Nicolet is 5.1 kilometres (3.2 mi) long and 1.7 kilometres (1.1 mi) wide, resembling a misshapen crescent surrounded by mountains. It has seven islands: Boulanger, Baril, Linke, L'Heureux, à Michel-Rheault, Rolland and a little unnamed island. The main mountain peaks around the lake are: Brûlé Mountain (500 metres (1,600 ft)) at 1.5 kilometres (0.93 mi) on the south side of the bay leading to the mouth of the lake; a 419 metres (1,375 ft) vertex on the west side and another on the southeast side (492 metres (1,614 ft)). This lake has a hundred chalets all around.

== Toponymy ==
The toponym "Lac Nicolet" was made official on December 5, 1968, at the Commission de toponymie du Québec.

== See also ==
- Nicolet River
- Centre-du-Québec, administrative region
