= Sainte-Anne-du-Sault =

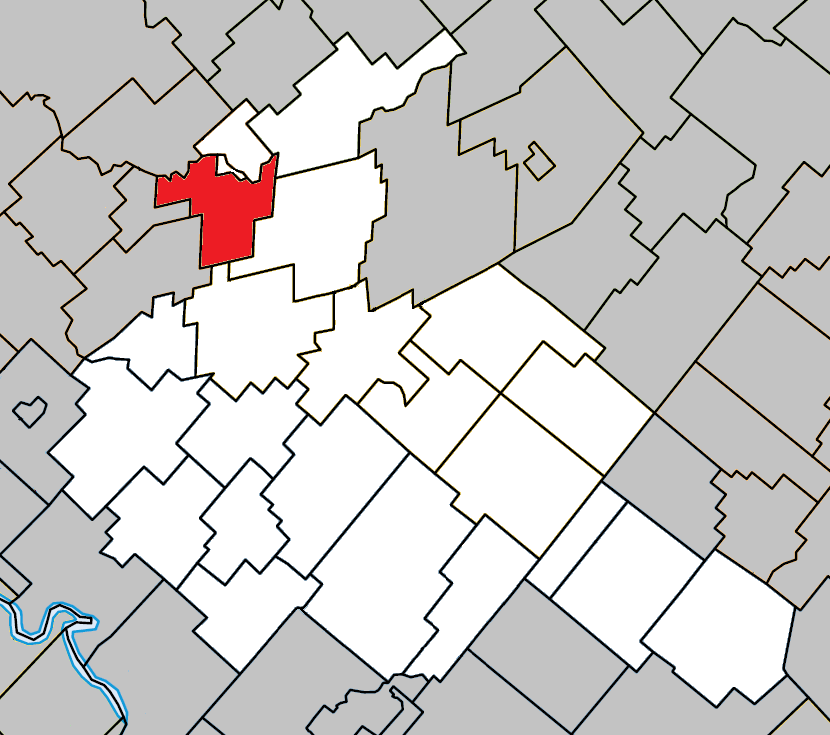
- Location within Arthabaska RCM.

- Location in southern Quebec.
- Coordinates: 46°11′N 72°08′W
- Country: Canada
- Province: Quebec
- Region: Centre-du-Québec
- RCM: Arthabaska
- Constituted: March 21, 1889

Government
  - Mayor: Jean-Claude Bourassa
  - Federal riding: Richmond—Arthabaska
  - Prov. riding: Nicolet-Bécancour

Area
  - Total: 60.40 km^{2} (23.32 sq mi)
  - Land: 59.61 km^{2} (23.02 sq mi)

Population (2011)
  - Total: 1,268
  - Density: 21.3/km^{2} (55/sq mi)
  - Pop 2006-2011: ▼3.6%
- Time zone: UTC−5 (EST)
  - Summer (DST): UTC−4 (EDT)
- Postal code(s): G0Z 1C0
- Area code: 819
- Highways A-20 (TCH): R-261

Sainte-Anne-du-Sault is a former municipality located in the Centre-du-Québec region of Quebec, Canada. It is merged to Daveluyville since March 9, 2016.
