= Notre-Dame-de-Ham =

- Municipality
- Aerial view of Notre-Dame-de-Ham

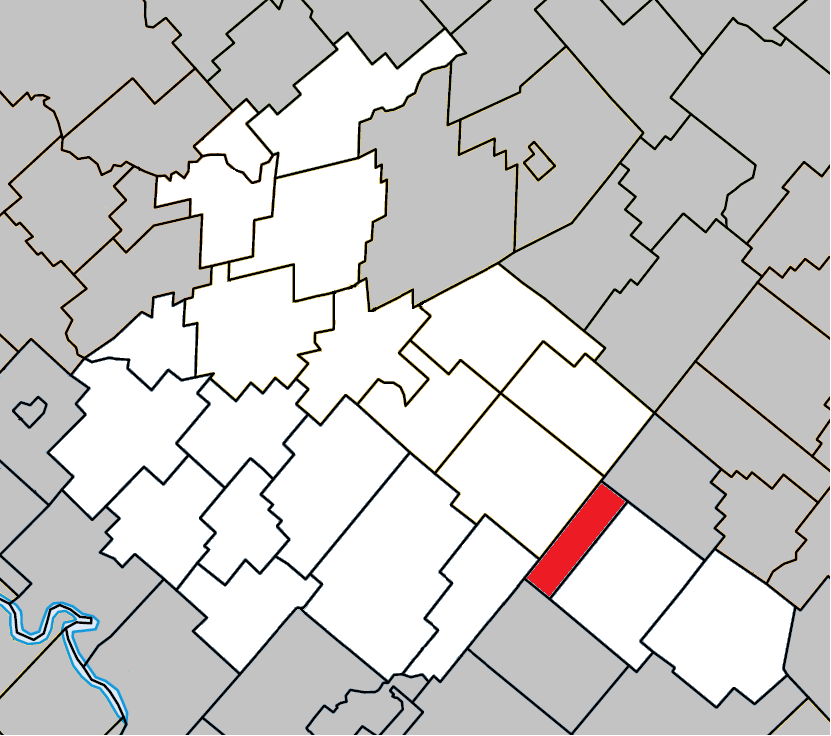
- Location within Arthabaska RCM.

- Location in southern Quebec.
- Coordinates: 45°54′N 71°44′W
- Country: Canada
- Province: Quebec
- Region: Centre-du-Québec
- RCM: Arthabaska
- Constituted: October 7, 1898

Government
  - Mayor: Sonia Roberge
  - Federal riding: Richmond—Arthabaska—des-Sources
  - Prov. riding: Drummond–Bois-Francs

Area
  - Total: 32.90 km^{2} (12.70 sq mi)
  - Land: 31.05 km^{2} (11.99 sq mi)

Population (2021)
  - Total: 414
  - Density: 13.3/km^{2} (34/sq mi)
  - Pop 2016-2021: ▲0.7%
- Time zone: UTC−5 (EST)
  - Summer (DST): UTC−4 (EDT)
- Postal code(s): G0P 1C0
- Area code: 819
- Highways: R-161
- Website: www.notre-dame-de-ham.ca

Notre-Dame-de-Ham (French pronunciation: [nɔtʁə dam də am]) is a municipality in Centre-du-Québec, Quebec, Canada.
