= Monfette =

Monfette may refer to:

== Persons ==
- Claudine Monfette (born 1945), a Quebec actress, screenwriter and lyricist
- Joseph-Victor Monfette (1841–1924), farmer and Canadian politician in Quebec

== Places ==
- Petite rivière à Monfette, a river in Centre-du-Québec, Québec, Canada
