= Nicolet River =

River of Centre-du-Québec, in Quebec, Canada

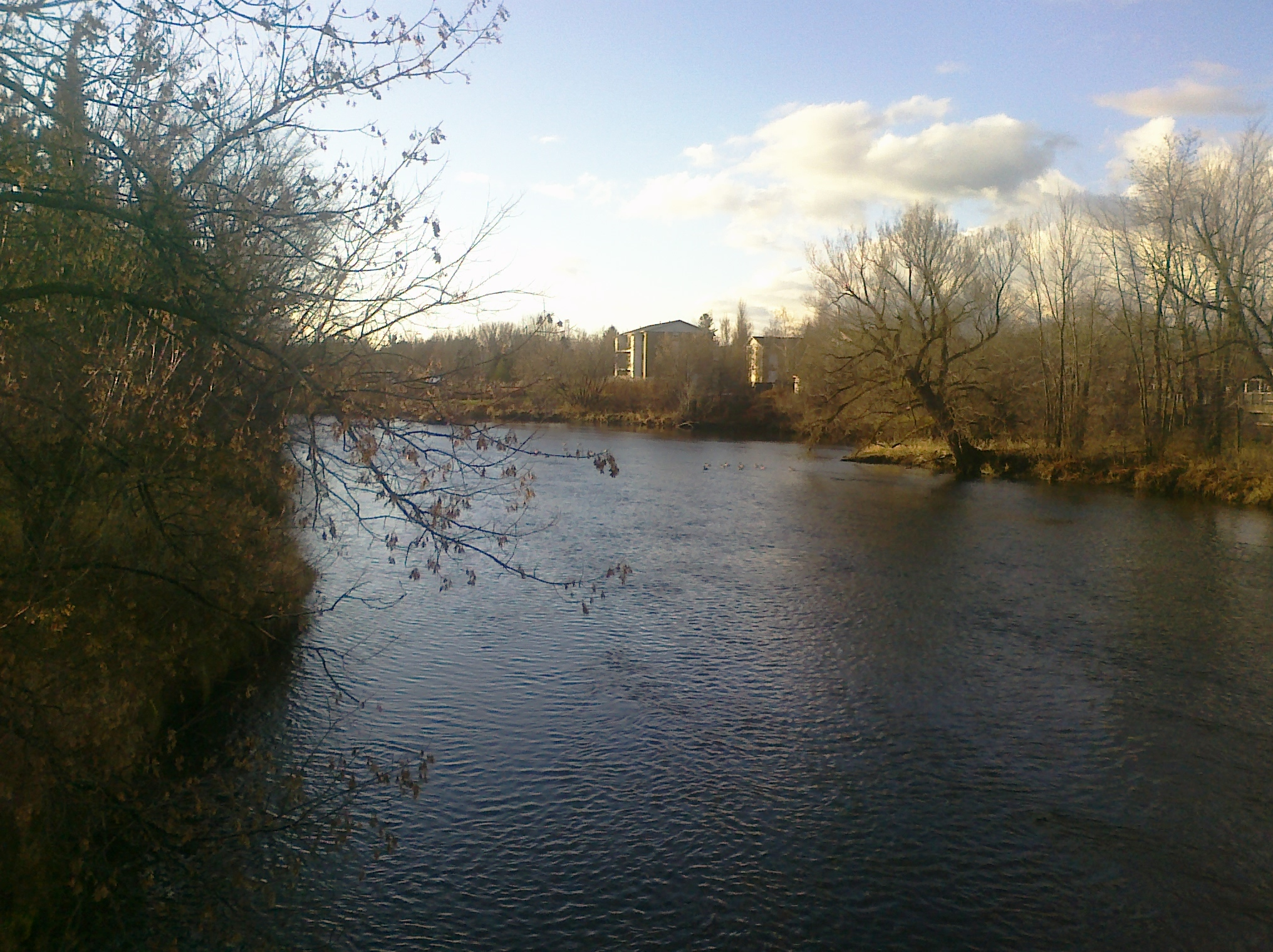
- Nicolet River in Kingsey Falls

- Location within Quebec
- Native name: Rivière Nicolet (French)

Location
- Country: Canada
- Province: Quebec
- Region: Centre-du-Québec
- MRC: Nicolet-Yamaska Regional County Municipality

Physical characteristics
- Source: Lake Nicolet
  - location: Saints-Martyrs-Canadiens
  - coordinates: 45°49′19″N 71°35′33″W
  - elevation: 350 metres (1,150 ft)
- Mouth: Lake Saint Pierre
  - location: Nicolet
  - coordinates: 46°15′09″N 72°39′09″W -->
  - elevation: 5 metres (16 ft)
- Length: 137 km (85 mi)
- Basin size: 3,380 km^{2} (1,310 mi^{2})

Basin features
- Progression: St. Lawrence River
- River system: Saint Lawrence River
- Tributaries
  - left: (upstream) chenal de la Ferme, cours d'eau André-Roy, Nicolet Southwest River, cours d'eau Roland-Pinard; ruisseaux: Maurice-Vincent, Houle, du Onzième, Martin, rivière des Rosiers, ruisseau Gosselin, ruisseau Noir, cours d'eau Nolin, ruisseau Morin, ruisseau Turgeon, décharge du lac à la Truite.
  - right: (upstream) ruisseaux: Bellerose, Yves-Proulx, de la Concession du Petit-Saint-Esprit, Siméon-Provencher, Horion, J.-B.-Provencher, Maurice-Turmel, Alfred-Lemire, Grondin-Comeau, Douglas, Camirand, Lepitre, Saint-Onge, Dubuc, Bulstrode River; ruisseaux: l'Abbé, Faucher, Taillon, Gosselin River; ruisseaux: Roux, des Roux, Brooks River, Dumont River, cours d'eau Lafontaine, cours d'eau Hamel; ruisseau des Aulnes, ruisseau de la Fromagerie, ruisseau Moras, ruisseau Girard, rivière des Vases, ruisseau Couture, ruisseau de l'Aunière.

The Nicolet River (French: Rivière Nicolet) is a river in Quebec, Canada. It is a tributary of the Saint Lawrence River on its southern shore and flows into Lake Saint Pierre. It is named in honor of the pioneer Jean Nicolet.

It has several tributaries including the River Bulstrode and the Nicolet River Southwest. Its watershed is mainly in the Centre-du-Québec region although the Southwest Nicolet rises in Estrie. The city of Nicolet is near its mouth on the lake Saint-Pierre which is crossed to the northwest by the St. Lawrence River.

== Geography ==
=== Hydrology ===
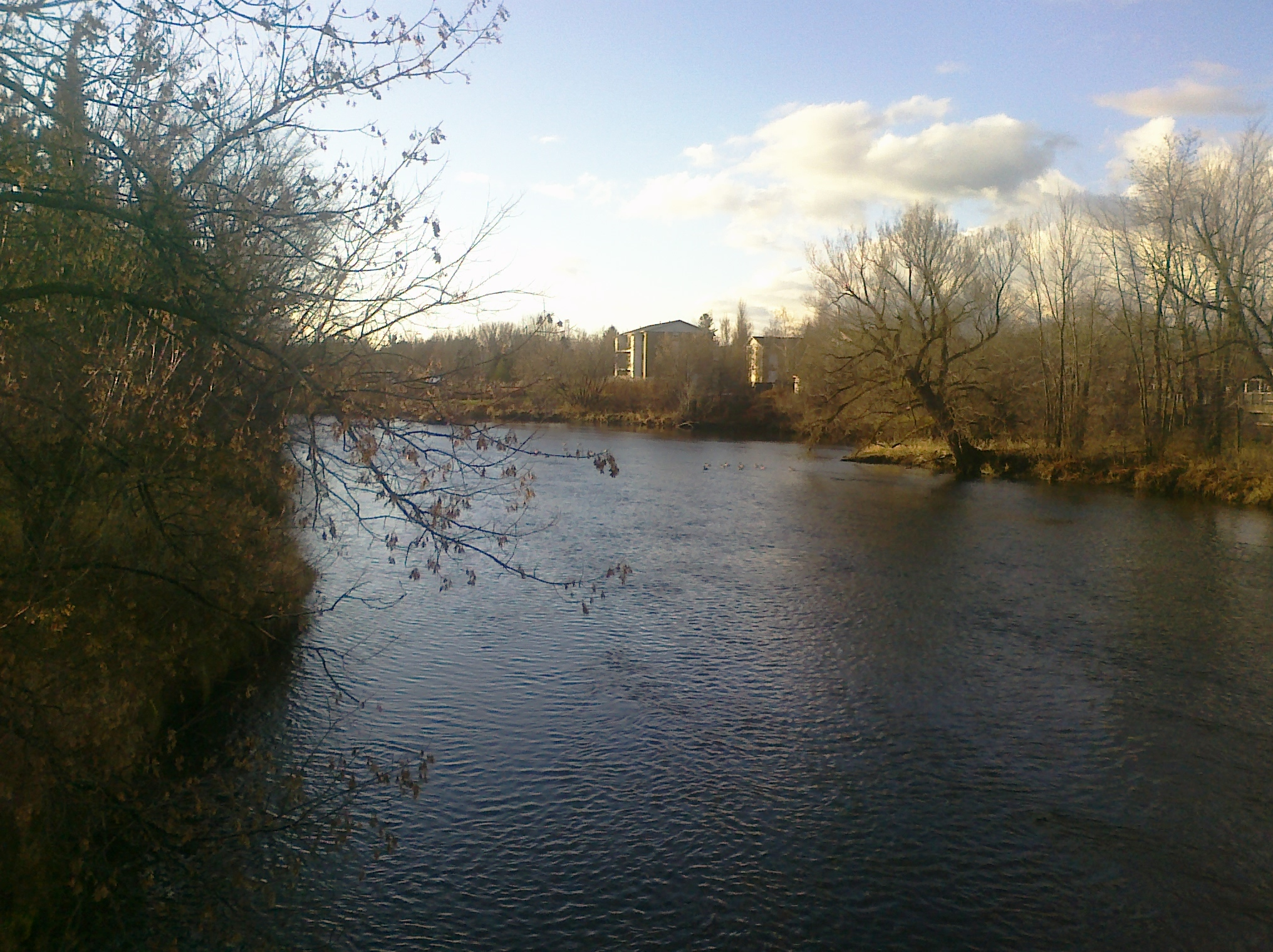
The Nicolet Southwest River, one of the tributaries of the Nicolet at Kingsey Falls

The Nicolet River begins its course from 137 kilometres (85 mi) at an altitude of approximately 350 metres (1,150 ft) in lake Nicolet, at Saints-Martyrs-Canadiens. It then flows in a northwesterly direction to Nicolet where it flows into lac Saint-Pierre.

Its watershed has an area of 3,380 kilometres (2,100.23 mi). Its modulus is 79 cubic metres per second (2,800 cu ft/s). Its main tributaries are, from upstream to downstream, the rivers des Vases, des Pins, des Rosiers, Bulstrode and Nicolet Southwest. The latter, which joins the Nicolet at 5 kilometres (3.1 mi), drains half of the basin. The basin includes 40 lakes, the most important of which are lake Nicolet (401 hectares (990 acres)), les Trois Lacs (Les Sources) (225 hectares (560 acres)) and the Beaudet reservoir (88 hectares (220 acres)).

=== Geology ===
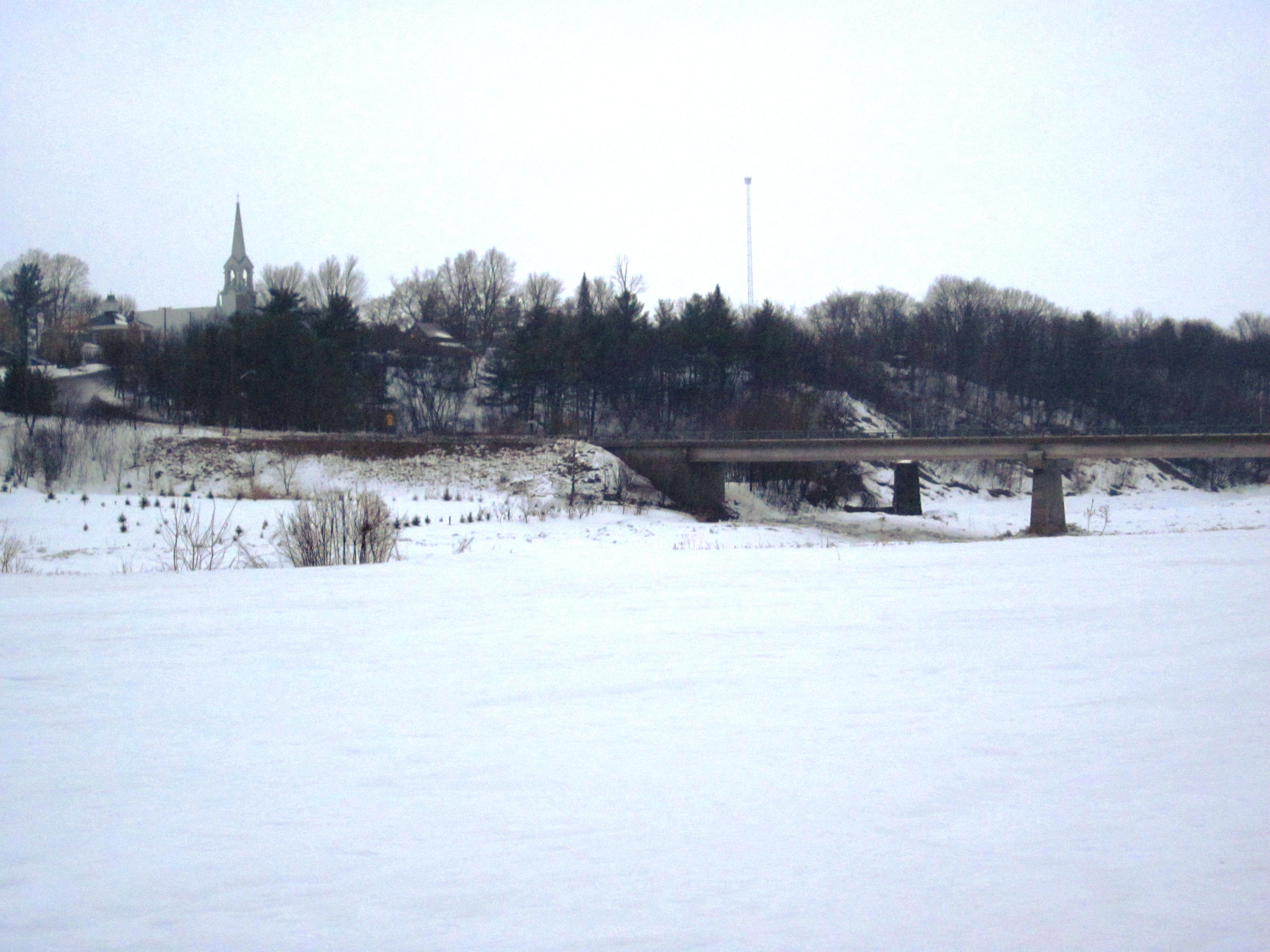
Rivière Nicolet at Sainte-Monique

The part upstream of Saint-Léonard-d'Aston is part of the Appalaches. The subsoil is composed of sedimentary rocks folded and metamorphosed (shale, slate and sandstone), volcanic rocks (basalt) and ultramafic rocks (Serpentine and asbestos). As for the section downstream from Saint-Léonard-d'Aston, it is composed of sedimentary rocks (schist, dolomite, limestone, sandstone) in horizontal strata of the St. Lawrence Lowlands.

The unconsolidated deposits of the Quaternary of the St. Lawrence Lowlands are composed of clay, sand and gravel from the retreat of the Champlain Sea and peatlands. The Appalachian sector is composed of tills from the retreat of the glaciers and fluvioglacial deposits composed of sand and gravel.

=== Population ===
The basin was inhabited by 96665 inhabitants in 2003. The territory is included in 37 municipalities. The main towns in the basin are Victoriaville (39799 inhabitants), Nicolet (7963 inhabitants) and Val-des-Sources (6627 inhabitants).

== Toponymy ==
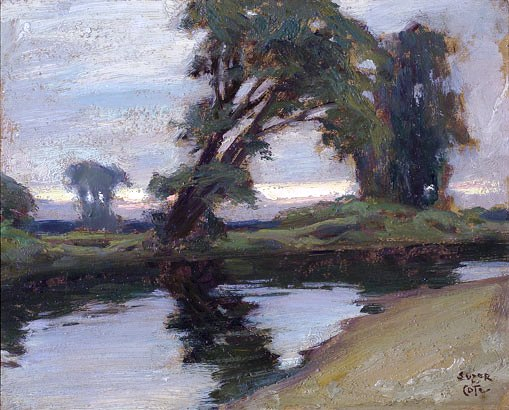
Painting by Marc-Aurèle de Foy Suzor-Coté.

The river was initially baptized Rivière Du Pont by Samuel de Champlain in 1609 to honor his friend François Gravé, sieur du Pont. It also bore the name of Gast river, in honor of Pierre Dugua de Mons (general of New France) and Monet River, in honor of Pierre Monet, sieur de Moras. As for its current name, it owes it to the explorer Jean Nicolet. They also bore the name of the first lords of Nicolet, namely Laubia and Cressé. The Abenakis call it Pithiganitekw, which means 'river of the entrance', due to the fact that it flows near the outlet of lake Saint-Pierre.

The toponym "rivière Nicolet" was made official on December 5, 1968 at the Commission de toponymie du Québec.

== See also ==
- List of rivers of Quebec
