= Sainte-Hélène-de-Chester =

- Municipality

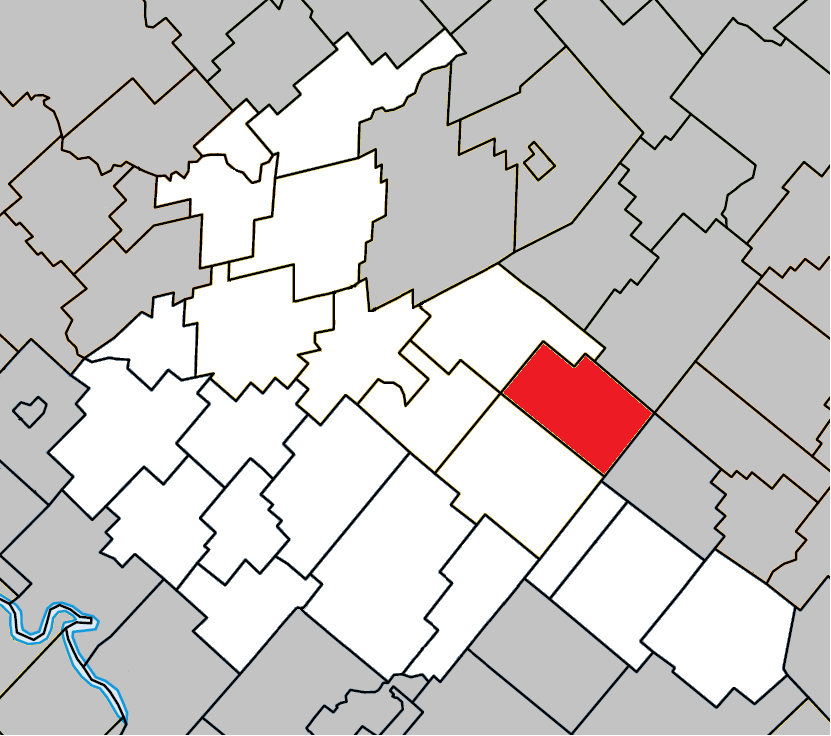
- Location within Arthabaska RCM.

- Location in southern Quebec.
- Coordinates: 46°02′N 71°42′W
- Country: Canada
- Province: Quebec
- Region: Centre-du-Québec
- RCM: Arthabaska
- Constituted: January 1, 1859

Government
  - Mayor: Lionel Fréchette
  - Federal riding: Richmond—Arthabaska—des-Sources
  - Prov. riding: Arthabaska-L'Érable

Area
  - Total: 84.10 km^{2} (32.47 sq mi)
  - Land: 83.72 km^{2} (32.32 sq mi)

Population (2021)
  - Total: 384
  - Density: 4.6/km^{2} (12/sq mi)
  - Pop 2016-2021: ▲2.7%
- Time zone: UTC−5 (EST)
  - Summer (DST): UTC−4 (EDT)
- Postal code(s): G0P 1H0
- Area code: 819
- Highways: R-263
- Website: www.sainte-helene-de-chester.ca

Sainte-Hélène-de-Chester (French pronunciation: [sɛ̃t‿elɛn də tʃɛstɚ, -œʁ]) is a municipality located in the Centre-du-Québec region of Quebec, Canada.

It was formerly a township municipality named Chester-Est, but it changed its name and its status on May 3, 2008.

The old Sainte-Hélène-de-Chester and Trottier Mill were two former small towns within this municipality.

== Sources ==
- (Google Maps)
