= Ham-Nord =

- Township municipality
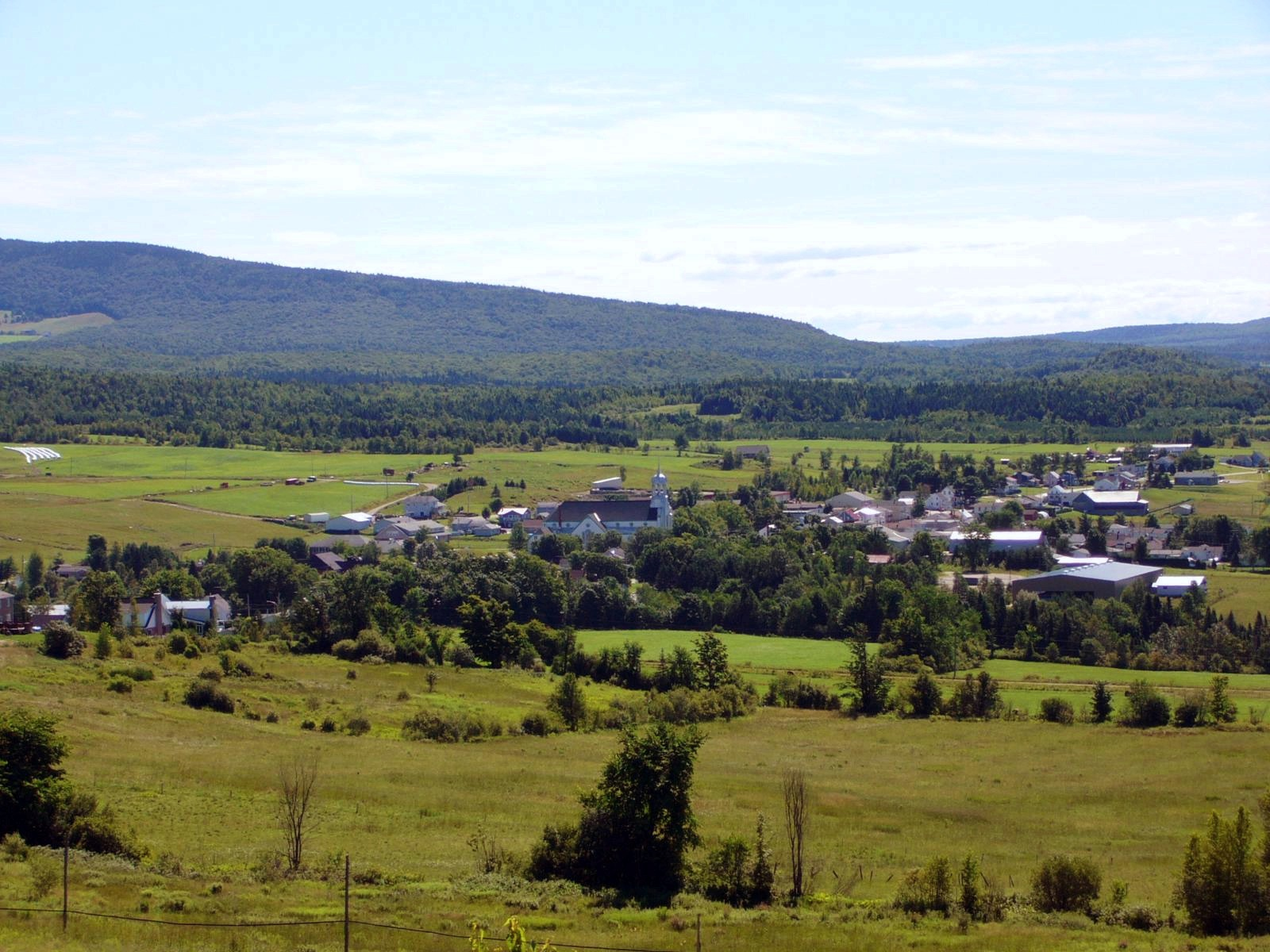
- Ham-Nord from Rang Saint-Philippe

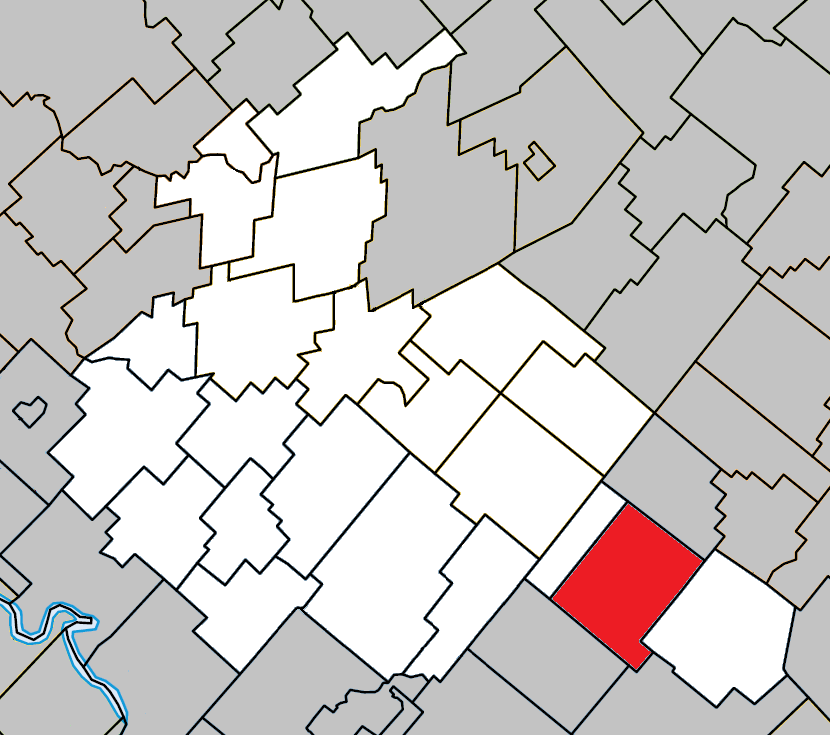
- Location within Arthabaska RCM.

- Location in southern Quebec.
- Coordinates: 45°54′N 71°39′W
- Country: Canada
- Province: Quebec
- Region: Centre-du-Québec
- RCM: Arthabaska
- Constituted: January 1, 1864
- Named for: Ham, Essex

Government
  - Mayor: Gaétan Fortier
  - Federal riding: Richmond—Arthabaska—des-Sources
  - Prov. riding: Drummond–Bois-Francs

Area
  - Total: 103.50 km^{2} (39.96 sq mi)
  - Land: 103.98 km^{2} (40.15 sq mi)

Population (2021)
  - Total: 857
  - Density: 8.2/km^{2} (21/sq mi)
  - Pop 2016-2021: ▼1.4%
- Time zone: UTC−5 (EST)
  - Summer (DST): UTC−4 (EDT)
- Postal code(s): G0P 1A0
- Area code: 819
- Highways: R-161; R-216
- Website: www.ham-nord.ca

Ham-Nord, Quebec is a township municipality in the Centre-du-Québec region of Quebec, Canada.

== Demographics ==
In the 2021 Census of Population conducted by Statistics Canada, Ham-Nord had a population of 857 living in 393 of its 446 total private dwellings, a change of −1.4% from its 2016 population of 869. With a land area of 103.98 km^{2} (40.15 sq mi), it had a population density of 8.2/km^{2} (21.3/sq mi) in 2021.
