= Sainte-Élizabeth-de-Warwick =

- Municipality
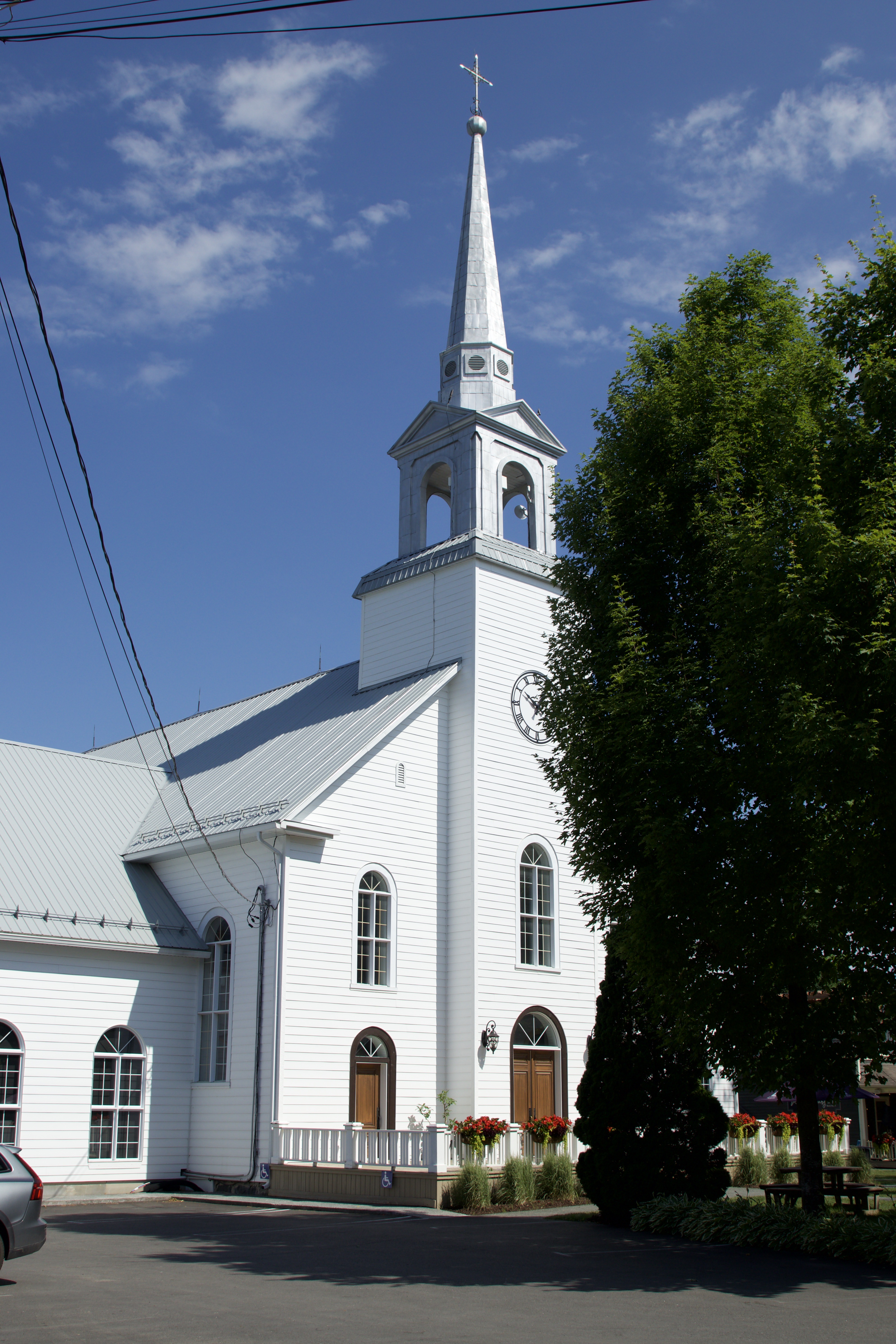

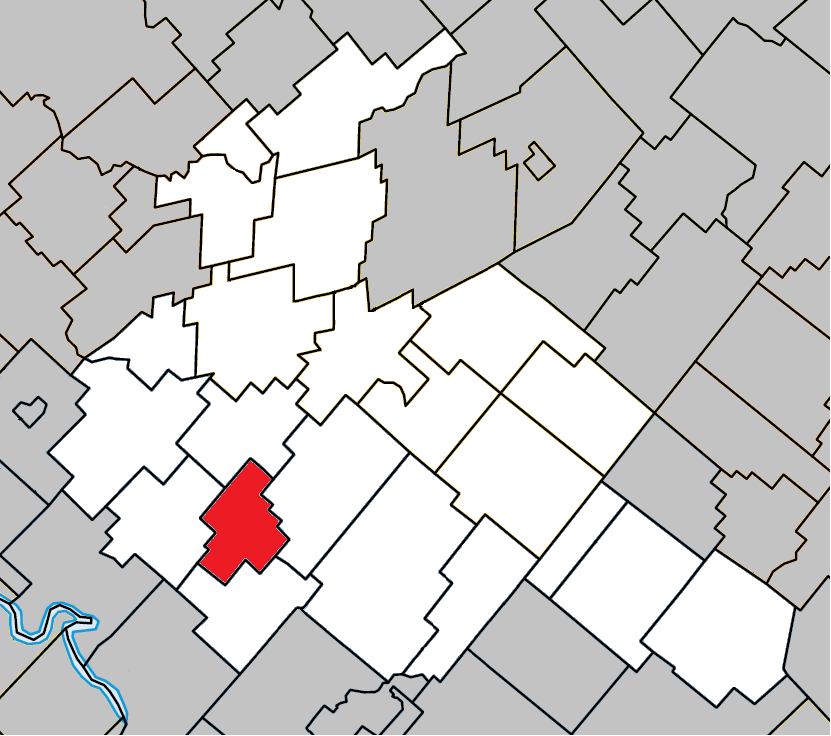
- Location within Arthabaska RCM.

- Location in southern Quebec.
- Coordinates: 45°55′N 72°05′W
- Country: Canada
- Province: Quebec
- Region: Centre-du-Québec
- RCM: Arthabaska
- Constituted: May 18, 1887

Government
  - Mayor: Pierre-Paul Leblanc
  - Federal riding: Richmond—Arthabaska—des-Sources
  - Prov. riding: Drummond–Bois-Francs

Area
  - Total: 51.60 km^{2} (19.92 sq mi)
  - Land: 52.08 km^{2} (20.11 sq mi)
- There is an apparent contradiction between two authoritative sources

Population (2016)
  - Total: 372
  - Density: 7.2/km^{2} (19/sq mi)
  - Pop 2011-2016: ▼0.5%
- Time zone: UTC−5 (EST)
  - Summer (DST): UTC−4 (EDT)
- Postal code(s): J0A 1M0
- Area code: 819
- Highways: No major routes
- Website: www.sainte-elizabeth -de-warwick.ca

Sainte-Élizabeth-de-Warwick is a municipality located in the Centre-du-Québec region of Quebec, Canada.

Before February 2, 2008, this administrative unit was a "Parish Municipality" and its name was spelled Sainte-Élisabeth-de-Warwick. In conjunction with the abolition of the parish municipality and re-establishment of a "non-designated" municipality, the spelling was updated as well.

The municipality is located in the Township of Warwick, mainly in the western part of rang 4.
