= Sainte-Séraphine =

- Parish municipality
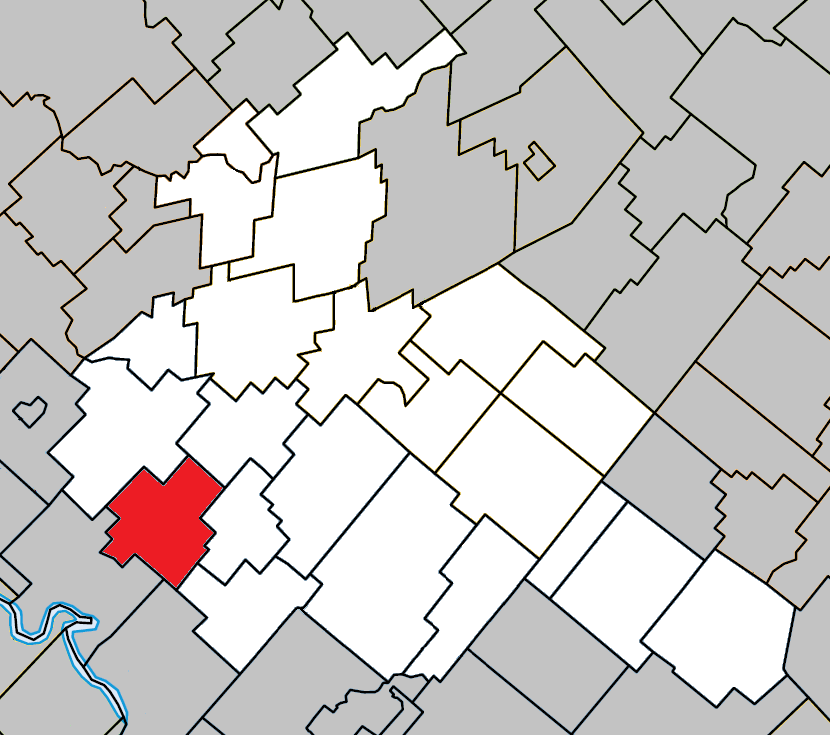
- Location within Arthabaska RCM.

- Location in southern Quebec.
- Coordinates: 45°55′N 72°11′W
- Country: Canada
- Province: Quebec
- Region: Centre-du-Québec
- RCM: Arthabaska
- Constituted: March 7, 1931

Government
  - Mayor: Sylvain Plante
  - Federal riding: Richmond—Arthabaska—des-Sources
  - Prov. riding: Drummond–Bois-Francs

Area
  - Total: 76.20 km^{2} (29.42 sq mi)
  - Land: 75.86 km^{2} (29.29 sq mi)

Population (2021)
  - Total: 441
  - Density: 5.8/km^{2} (15/sq mi)
  - Pop 2016-2021: ▲24.2%
- Time zone: UTC−5 (EST)
  - Summer (DST): UTC−4 (EDT)
- Postal code(s): J0A 1E0
- Area code: 819
- Highways: No major routes
- Website: www.mun sainteseraphine.ca

Sainte-Séraphine (French pronunciation: [sɛ̃t seʁafin]) is a parish municipality located in the Centre-du-Québec region of Quebec, Canada.

== Demographics ==
In the 2021 Census of Population conducted by Statistics Canada, Sainte-Séraphine had a population of 441 living in 176 of its 224 total private dwellings, a change of 24.2% from its 2016 population of 355. With a land area of 75.86 km^{2} (29.29 sq mi), it had a population density of 5.8/km^{2} (15.1/sq mi) in 2021.
