= Kingsey Falls =

- City
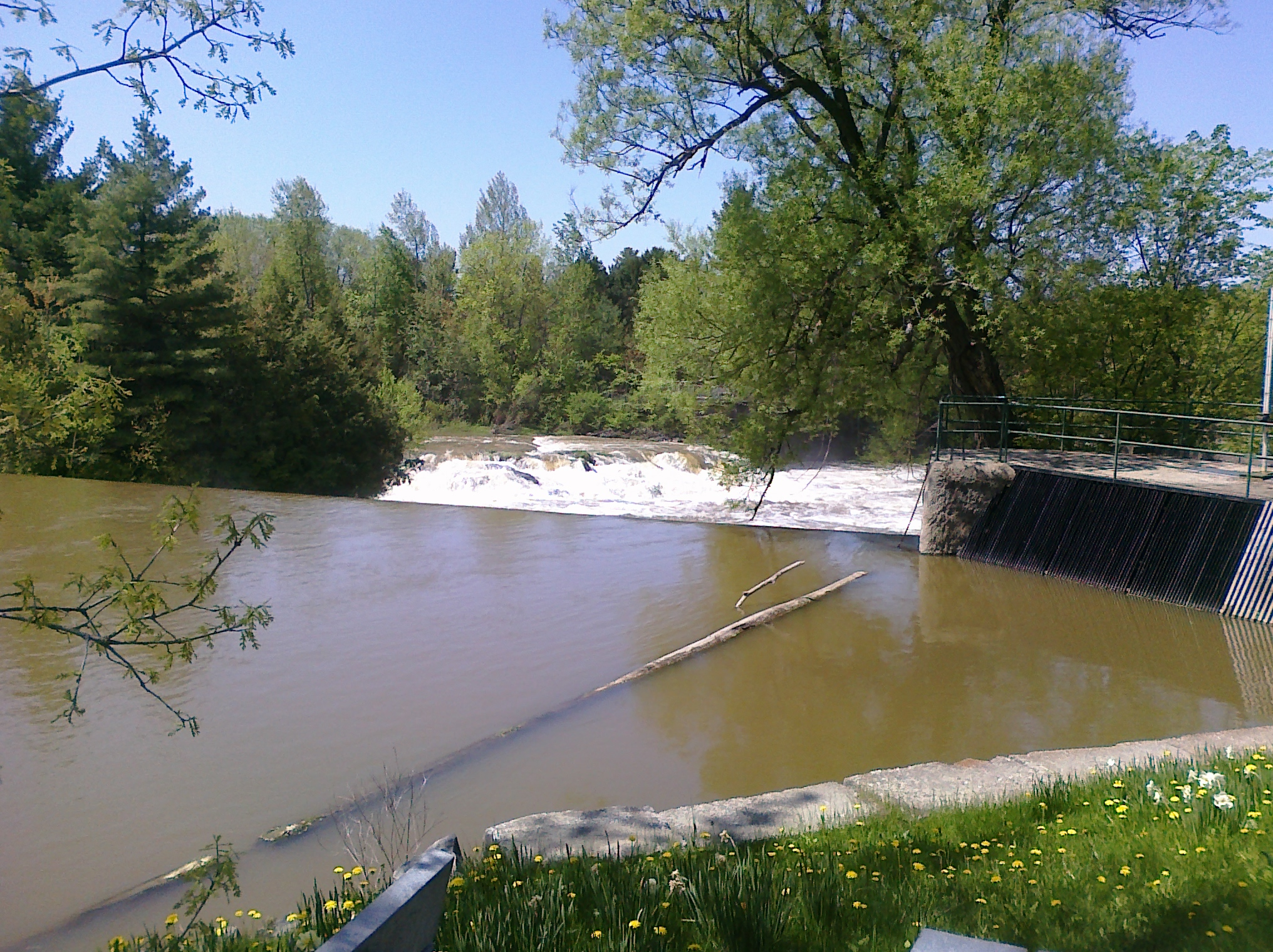
- Nicolet River

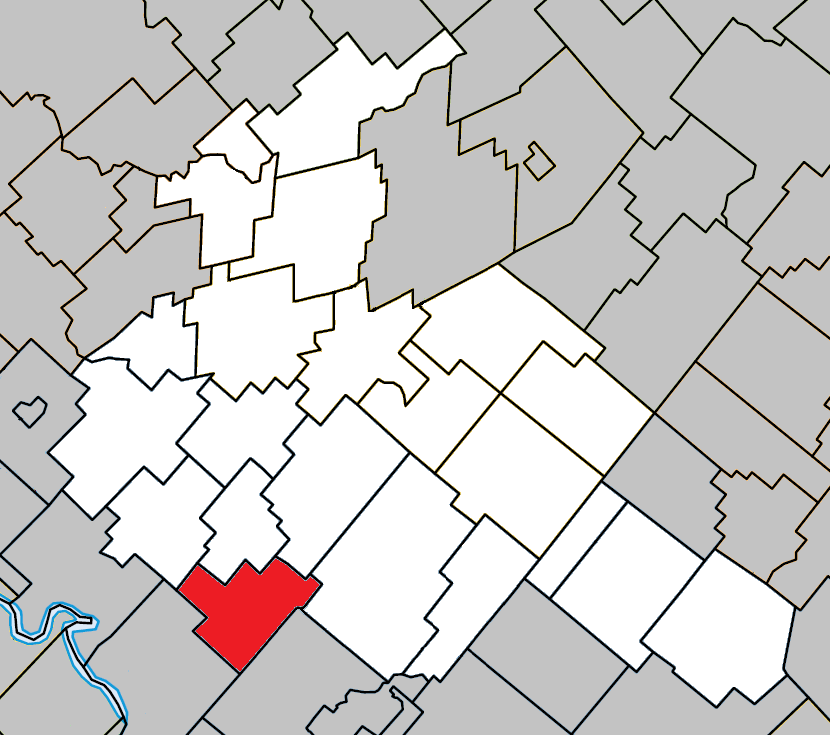
- Location within Arthabaska RCM.

- Location in southern Quebec.
- Coordinates: 45°51′N 72°04′W
- Country: Canada
- Province: Quebec
- Region: Centre-du-Québec
- RCM: Arthabaska
- Constituted: December 31, 1997

Government
  - Mayor: Christian Tisluck
  - Federal riding: Richmond—Arthabaska—des-Sources
  - Prov. riding: Drummond–Bois-Francs

Area
  - City: 70.50 km^{2} (27.22 sq mi)
  - Land: 69.36 km^{2} (26.78 sq mi)

Population (2021)
  - City: 1,986
  - Density: 28.6/km^{2} (74/sq mi)
  - Urban: 1,419
  - Pop 2016-2021: ▲2.0%
- Time zone: UTC−5 (EST)
  - Summer (DST): UTC−4 (EDT)
- Postal code(s): J0A 1B0
- Area code: 819
- Highways: R-116; R-255
- Website: www.kingseyfalls.ca

Kingsey Falls, Quebec is a town in Centre-du-Québec, Quebec, Canada, with a population of 1,986 according to the 2021 census. It is 30 km east of Drummondville and west of Route 116. One of the largest employers in the community is Cascades, which is headquartered there.

== Demographics ==
In the 2021 Census of Population conducted by Statistics Canada, Kingsey Falls had a population of 1,986 living in 800 of its 837 total private dwellings, a change of 2% from its 2016 population of 1,947. With a land area of 69.36 km^{2} (26.78 sq mi), it had a population density of 28.6/km^{2} (74.2/sq mi) in 2021.

Population:

- Population in 2021: 1,986 (2016 to 2021 population change: 2.0%)
- Population in 2016: 1,947 (2011 to 2016 population change: -2.7%)
- Population in 2011: 2,000
- Population in 2006: 2,086
- Population in 2001: 2,023
- Population in 1996: 539
- Population in 1991: 456
- Population in 1986: 524
- Population in 1981: 487
- Population in 1976: 393
- Population in 1971: 403
- Population in 1966: 439
- Population in 1961: 413
- Population in 1956: 448
- Population in 1951: 476
- Population in 1941: 471
- Population in 1931: 452
- Population in 1921: 947
- Population in 1911: 851
- Population in 1901: 866
- Population in 1891: 924
- Population in 1881: 764
- Population in 1871: 730

== See also ==
- Marie-Victorin Kirouac
