= Tingwick =

- Municipality
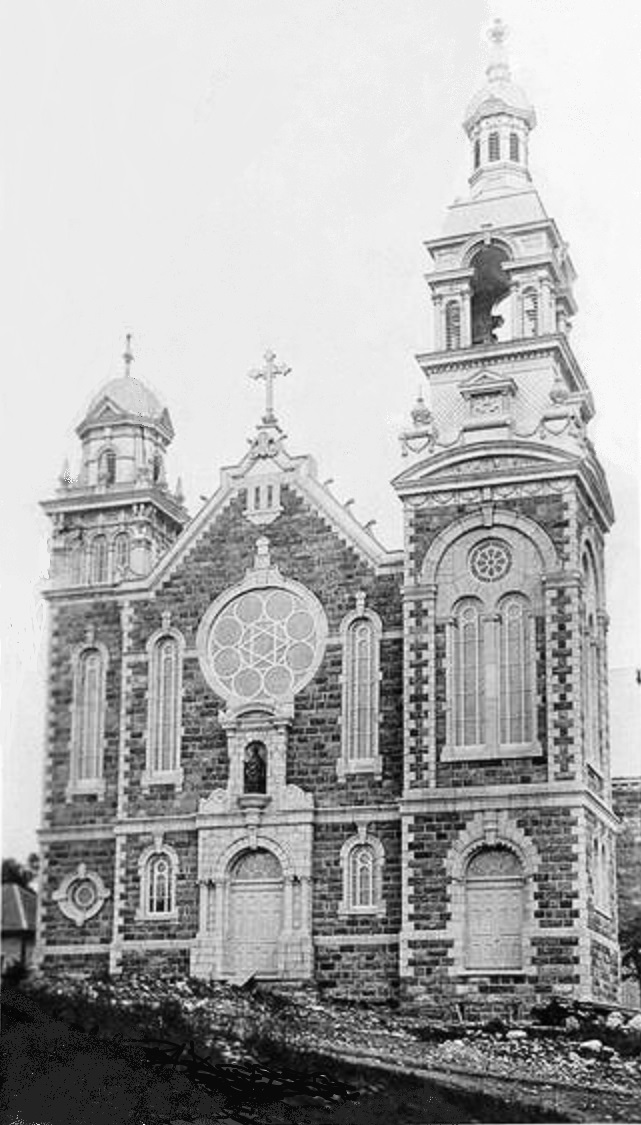

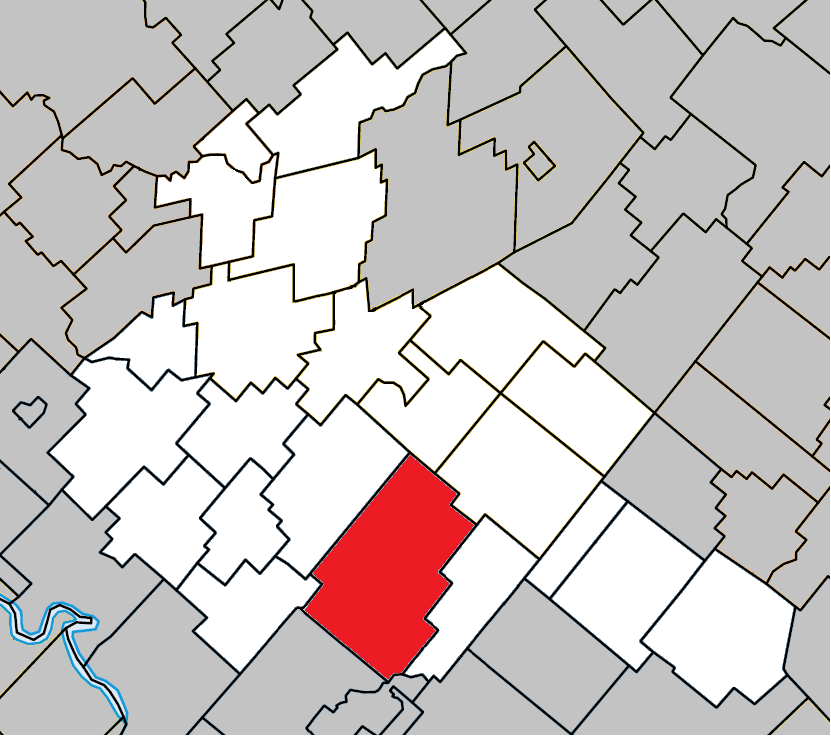
- Location within Arthabaska RCM.

- Location in southern Quebec.
- Coordinates: 45°53′N 72°57′W
- Country: Canada
- Province: Quebec
- Region: Centre-du-Québec
- RCM: Arthabaska
- Constituted: December 12, 1981

Government
  - Mayor: Réal Fortin
  - Federal riding: Richmond—Arthabaska—des-Sources
  - Prov. riding: Drummond–Bois-Francs

Area
  - Total: 170.10 km^{2} (65.68 sq mi)
  - Land: 169.48 km^{2} (65.44 sq mi)

Population (2021)
  - Total: 1,484
  - Density: 8.8/km^{2} (23/sq mi)
  - Pop 2016-2021: ▲5.2%
- Demonym: Tingwickois
- Time zone: UTC−5 (EST)
  - Summer (DST): UTC−4 (EDT)
- Postal code(s): J0A 1L0
- Area code: 819
- Geographical code: 39025
- Website: www.tingwick.ca

Tingwick is a Canadian municipality of Quebec established in Arthabaska Regional County Municipality, Quebec.

== Geography ==
The Municipality of Tingwick is located within the township of Tingwick in the Eastern Townships. There are 2 rivers: Rivière des Pins and Rivière des Rosiers (also known as Trout River).

== Economy ==
Agriculture is the main industry in the area, focusing on dairy, pork, and maple sugar production.

== Arts and culture ==
Festival "Rodeo Mecanique" in August.

== Sport ==
A skiing centre is located at Mount Gleason.

== Infrastructure ==
- Catholic church Saint Patrick since 1857.
- Primary school Saint-Coeur-de-Marie.
