= Saint-Albert, Quebec =

Saint-Albert
- Municipality
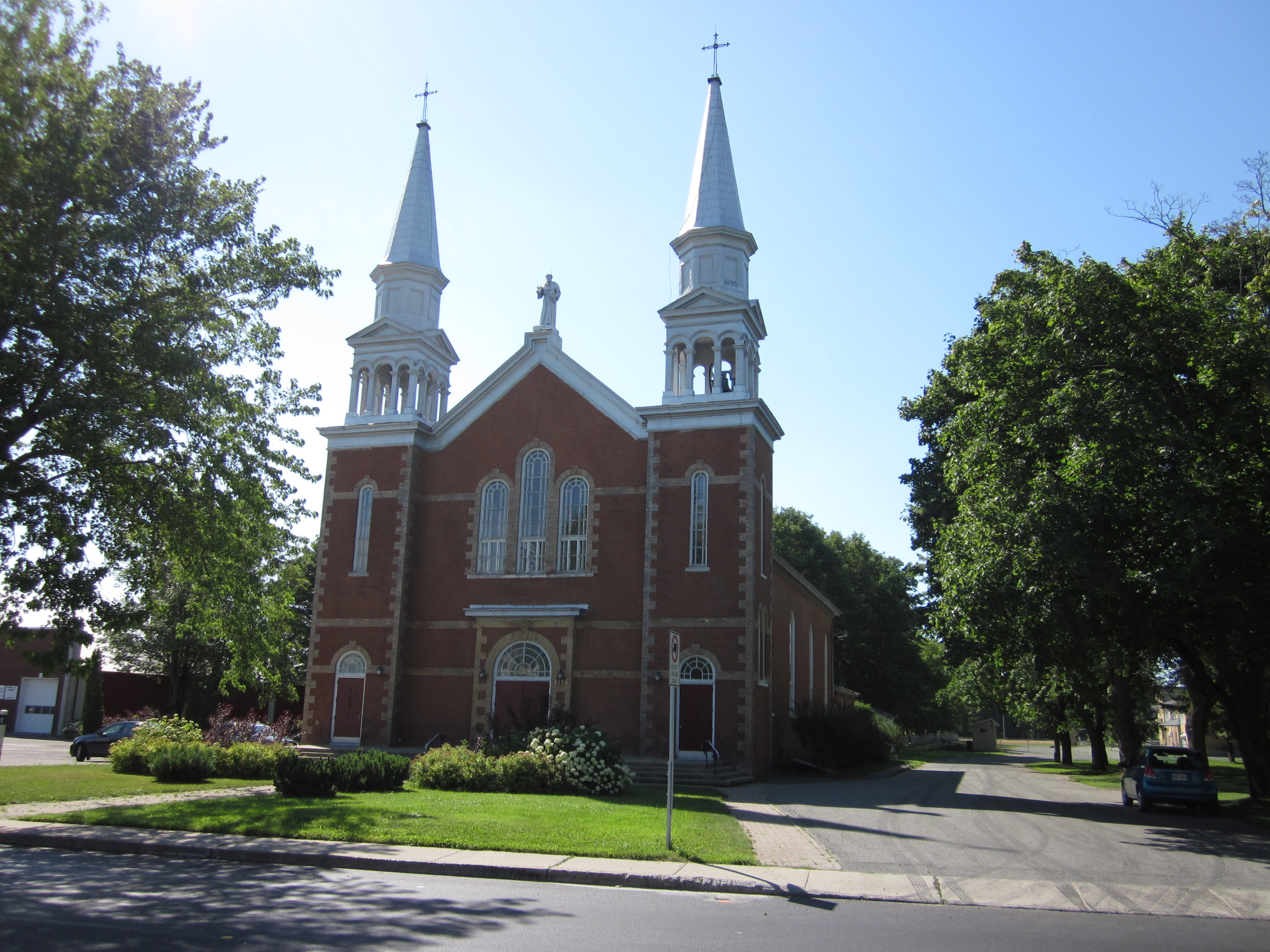

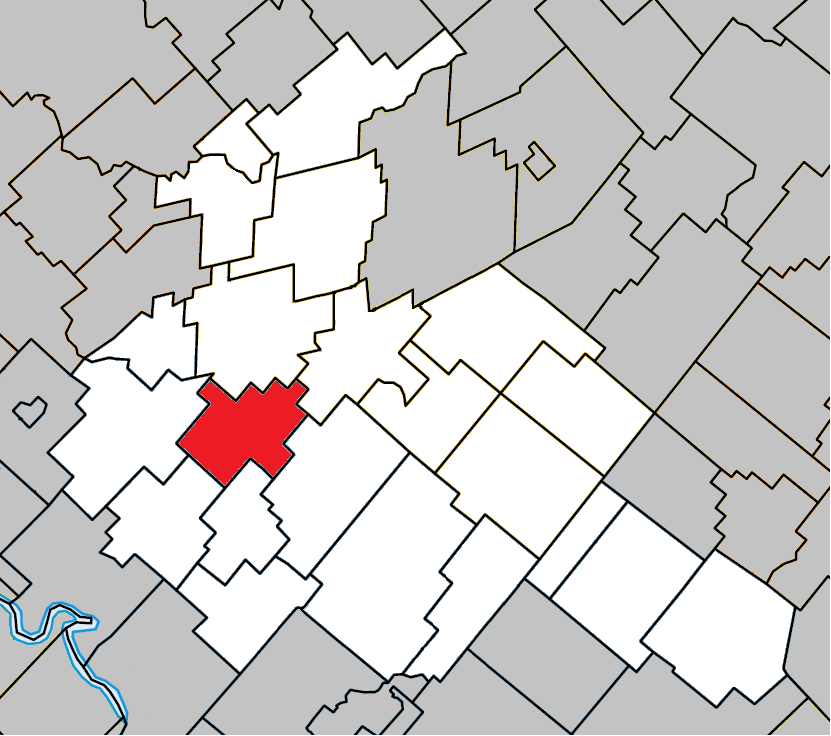
- Location within Arthabaska RCM

- Location in southern Quebec.
- Coordinates: 46°00′N 72°05′W
- Country: Canada
- Province: Quebec
- Region: Centre-du-Québec
- RCM: Arthabaska
- Constituted: January 1, 1864

Government
  - Mayor: Jean Boissonneault
  - Federal riding: Richmond—Arthabaska—des-Sources
  - Prov. riding: Drummond–Bois-Francs

Area
  - Total: 70.30 km^{2} (27.14 sq mi)
  - Land: 69.87 km^{2} (26.98 sq mi)

Population (2011)
  - Total: 1,526
  - Density: 21.8/km^{2} (56/sq mi)
  - Pop 2006-2011: ▲1.7%
- Time zone: UTC−5 (EST)
  - Summer (DST): UTC−4 (EDT)
- Postal code(s): J0A 1E0
- Area code: 819
- Highways A-955: R-122
- Website: www.munstalbert.ca

Saint-Albert (French pronunciation: [sɛ̃t‿albɛʁ]) is a municipality located in the Centre-du-Québec region of Quebec, Canada.

== Notable people ==
- Alex Labbé
