= Saint-Rémi-de-Tingwick =

- Municipality
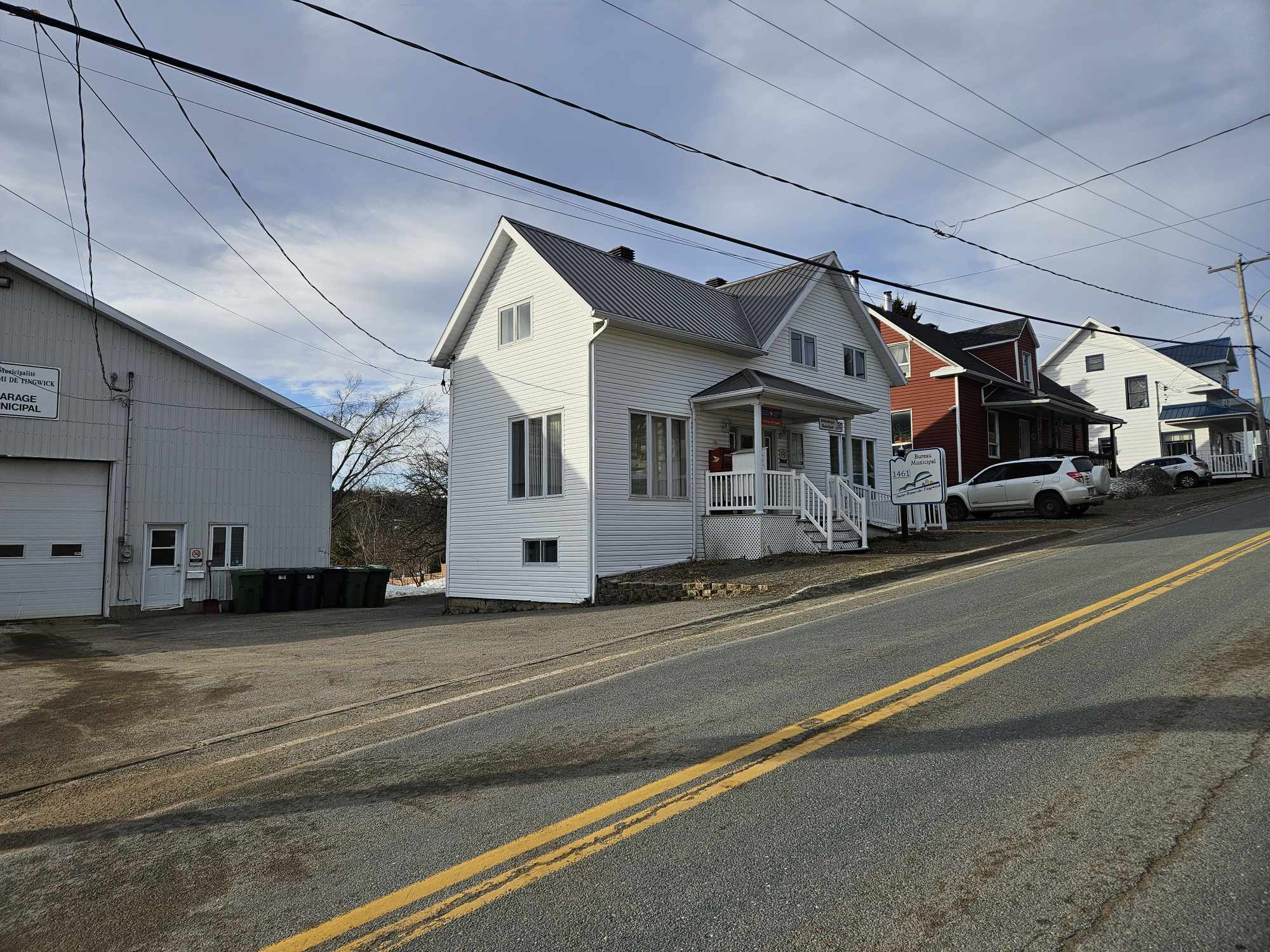

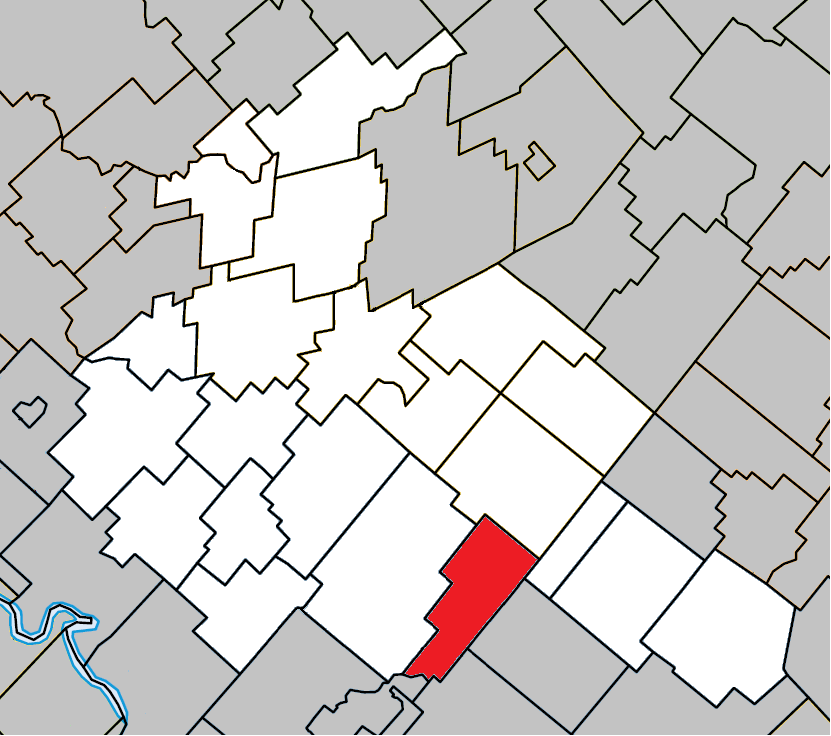
- Location within Arthabaska RCM.

- Location in southern Quebec.
- Coordinates: 45°52′N 71°49′W
- Country: Canada
- Province: Quebec
- Region: Centre-du-Québec
- RCM: Arthabaska
- Constituted: January 1, 1882

Government
  - Mayor: Pierre Auger
  - Federal riding: Richmond—Arthabaska—des-Sources
  - Prov. riding: Drummond–Bois-Francs

Area
  - Total: 73.80 km^{2} (28.49 sq mi)
  - Land: 72.97 km^{2} (28.17 sq mi)

Population (2021)
  - Total: 446
  - Density: 6.1/km^{2} (16/sq mi)
  - Pop 2016-2021: ▼2.6%
- Time zone: UTC−5 (EST)
  - Summer (DST): UTC−4 (EDT)
- Postal code(s): J0A 1K0
- Area code: 819
- Highways: No major routes
- Website: www.st-remi-de- tingwick.qc.ca

Saint-Rémi-de-Tingwick is a municipality located in the Centre-du-Québec region of Quebec, Canada.
