= Warwick, Quebec =

Warwick
- City
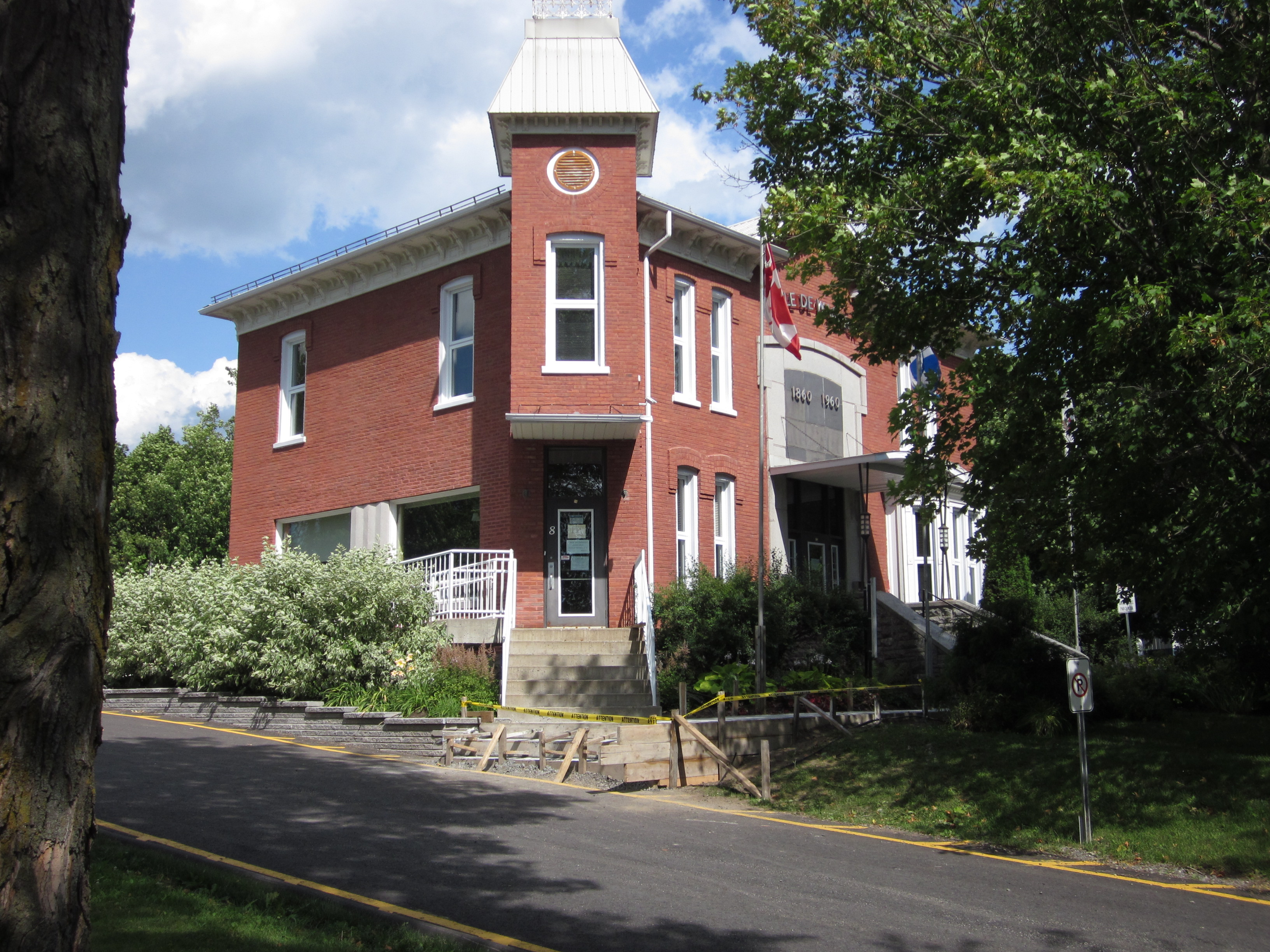

- Coat of arms

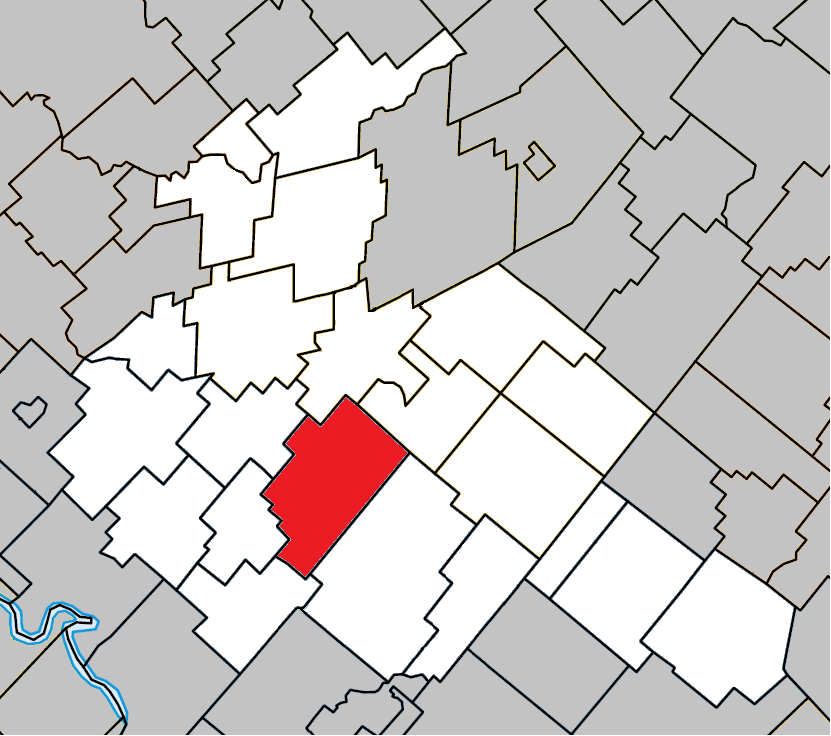
- Location within Arthabaska RCM

- Location in southern Quebec.
- Coordinates: 45°57′N 71°59′W
- Country: Canada
- Province: Quebec
- Region: Centre-du-Québec
- RCM: Arthabaska
- Constituted: March 15, 2000

Government
  - Mayor: Étienne Bergeron
  - Federal riding: Richmond—Arthabaska—des-Sources
  - Prov. riding: Drummond–Bois-Francs

Area
  - Total: 110.40 km^{2} (42.63 sq mi)
  - Land: 109.97 km^{2} (42.46 sq mi)

Population (2011)
  - Total: 4,766
  - Density: 43.3/km^{2} (112/sq mi)
  - Pop 2006-2011: ▼0.8%
- Time zone: UTC−5 (EST)
  - Summer (DST): UTC−4 (EDT)
- Postal code(s): J0A 1M0
- Area code: 819
- Highways: R-116
- Website: www.ville.warwick.qc.ca

Warwick is a small town north east of Montreal, located in Arthabaska county, Quebec, Canada. The town was incorporated in 1861 and named after the town of the same name in England.

Up until 2014 the town hosted Quebec's annual summer cheese festival, which showcases many of the locally produced artisanal cheeses. In 2014 the festival was moved to Victoriaville. Warwick also claims to be one of the possible birthplaces of poutine (fries with gravy and cheese curds).

It is an industrial centre, with factories for agricultural machinery, washing-machines, overalls, cheese-boxes, and doors.

Warwick is located on Route 116.

== Demographics ==
In the 2021 Census of Population conducted by Statistics Canada, Warwick had a population of 4,729 living in 2,063 of its 2,136 total private dwellings, a change of 2% from its 2016 population of 4,635. With a land area of 109.6 km^{2} (42.3 sq mi), it had a population density of 43.1/km^{2} (111.8/sq mi) in 2021.

== Government ==
=== Political representation ===
Warwick federal election results
Year	Liberal		Conservative		Bloc Québécois		New Democratic		Green	
2021	11%	281	48%	1,221	30%	746	5%	115	0%	0
2019	14%	351	50%	1,254	25%	617	5%	131	5%	124

Warwick provincial election results
Year	CAQ		Liberal		QC solidaire		Parti Québécois	
2018	58%	1,432	14%	339	13%	330	11%	259
2014	45%	1,142	29%	732	5%	134	19%	474

Federally, Warwick is part of the federal riding of Richmond—Arthabaska—des-Sources. In the 2025 Canadian federal election, Eric Lefebvre of the Conservative Party was elected to represent the population Warwick in the House of Commons of Canada.

Provincially it is part of the riding of Drummond–Bois-Francs. In the 2026 Quebec general election, Charles Page of the Parti Québécois, was elected to represent the population of Warwick in the National Assembly of Quebec.

== Economy ==
Originally centred on textiles, Warwick's economy is mainly oriented towards the dairy industry, agri-food processing and small and medium-sized industrial enterprises.

According to many, it is the place where poutine was invented. On April 20, 2007, the Town of Warwick legally registered the trademark "Warwick, capitale des fromages fins du Québec".

The Industries

Yum Yum Chips (Potato Chips)

Orchards of the horizons (Apples)

Roland Boulanger (Mouldings)

Fromagerie Victoria (Restaurant)

DCN Plastic (Plastics)

Fenergic (Doors & Windows)

REFLEC (Windows)

The Canton Roastery (Café)

Warwick Jeans (Jeans)

Warwick Ladders (Ladders)

AzkoNobel Wood Paints Ltd.

WestRock (Paper/Printing)
