= Arthabaska Regional County Municipality =

Arthabaska
- Regional county municipality
- Location in Quebec
- Coordinates: 45°55′N 72°05′W
- Country: Canada
- Province: Quebec
- Region: Centre-du-Québec
- Effective: January 1, 1982
- County seat: Victoriaville

Government
  - Type: Prefecture
  - Prefect: Lionel Fréchette

Area
  - Total: 1,910.60 km^{2} (737.69 sq mi)
  - Land: 1,890.18 km^{2} (729.80 sq mi)

Population (2016)
  - Total: 72,014
  - Density: 38.1/km^{2} (99/sq mi)
  - Change 2011-2016: ▲4.0%
  - Dwellings: 33,483
- Time zone: UTC−05:00 (EST)
  - Summer (DST): UTC−04:00 (EDT)
- Area code: 819
- Website: www.mrc-arthabaska.qc.ca

Arthabaska Regional County Municipality (French pronunciation: [aʁtabaska]) is a regional county municipality located in the Centre-du-Québec region of Quebec. Its seat is Victoriaville.

== Subdivisions ==
There are 22 subdivisions within the RCM:

Cities & Towns (4)

- Daveluyville
- Kingsey Falls
- Victoriaville
- Warwick

Municipalities (13)

- Chesterville
- Maddington Falls
- Notre-Dame-de-Ham
- Saint-Albert
- Sainte-Clotilde-de-Horton
- Sainte-Élizabeth-de-Warwick
- Sainte-Hélène-de-Chester
- Saint-Louis-de-Blandford
- Saint-Norbert-d'Arthabaska
- Saint-Rémi-de-Tingwick
- Saint-Samuel
- Saint-Valère
- Tingwick

Parishes (4)

- Saint-Christophe-d'Arthabaska
- Sainte-Séraphine
- Saint-Rosaire
- Saints-Martyrs-Canadiens

Townships (1)

- Ham-Nord

== Demographics ==
Mother tongue from 2016 Canadian Census

Language	Population	Pct (%)
French only	69,175	97.1%
English only	520	0.7%
Both English and French	215	0.3%
Other languages	1,335	1.9%

== Attractions ==
- Cinq-Chicots School of the Row (Saint-Christophe-d'Arthabaska)
- LaPierre Mill (Norbertville)
- Laurier Museum (Victoriaville)
- Marie-Victorin Park (Kingsey Falls)
- Postes Pavilion Hotel (Victoriaville)
- Rivière Nicolet Trout Fishing Post (Notre-Dame-de-Ham)
- Saint-Michel Mountain (Victoriaville)
- St-Médard Church (1874) (Warwick)

== Transportation ==
=== Access Routes ===
Highways and numbered routes that run through the municipality, including external routes that start or finish at the county border:

- Autoroutes
  - A-20 (TCH)
  - A-955
- Principal Highways
  - R-116
  - R-122
  - R-161
  - R-162
  - R-165
- Secondary Highways
  - R-216
  - R-218
  - R-255
  - R-261
  - R-263
- External Routes
  - None

== See also ==
- List of regional county municipalities and equivalent territories in Quebec
