= Centre-du-Québec =

- Region
- Map of Centre-du-Québec in relation to Quebec.
- Coordinates: 46°17′N 72°04′W
- Country: Canada
- Province: Quebec

Government
  - Table des MRC du Centre-du-Québec (Regional conference of elected officers): Lionel Fréchette (President)

Area
  - Land: 6,930.05 km^{2} (2,675.71 sq mi)

Population (2016)
  - Total: 242,399
  - Density: 35/km^{2} (91/sq mi)
- Website: www.centreduquebec.gouv.qc.ca

Centre-du-Québec (French pronunciation: [sɑ̃tʁ dy kebɛk], Central Quebec) is a region of Quebec, Canada. The main centres are Drummondville, Victoriaville, and Bécancour. It has a land area of 6,930.05 square kilometres (2,675.71 sq mi) and a 2016 census population of 242,399 inhabitants.

== Description ==
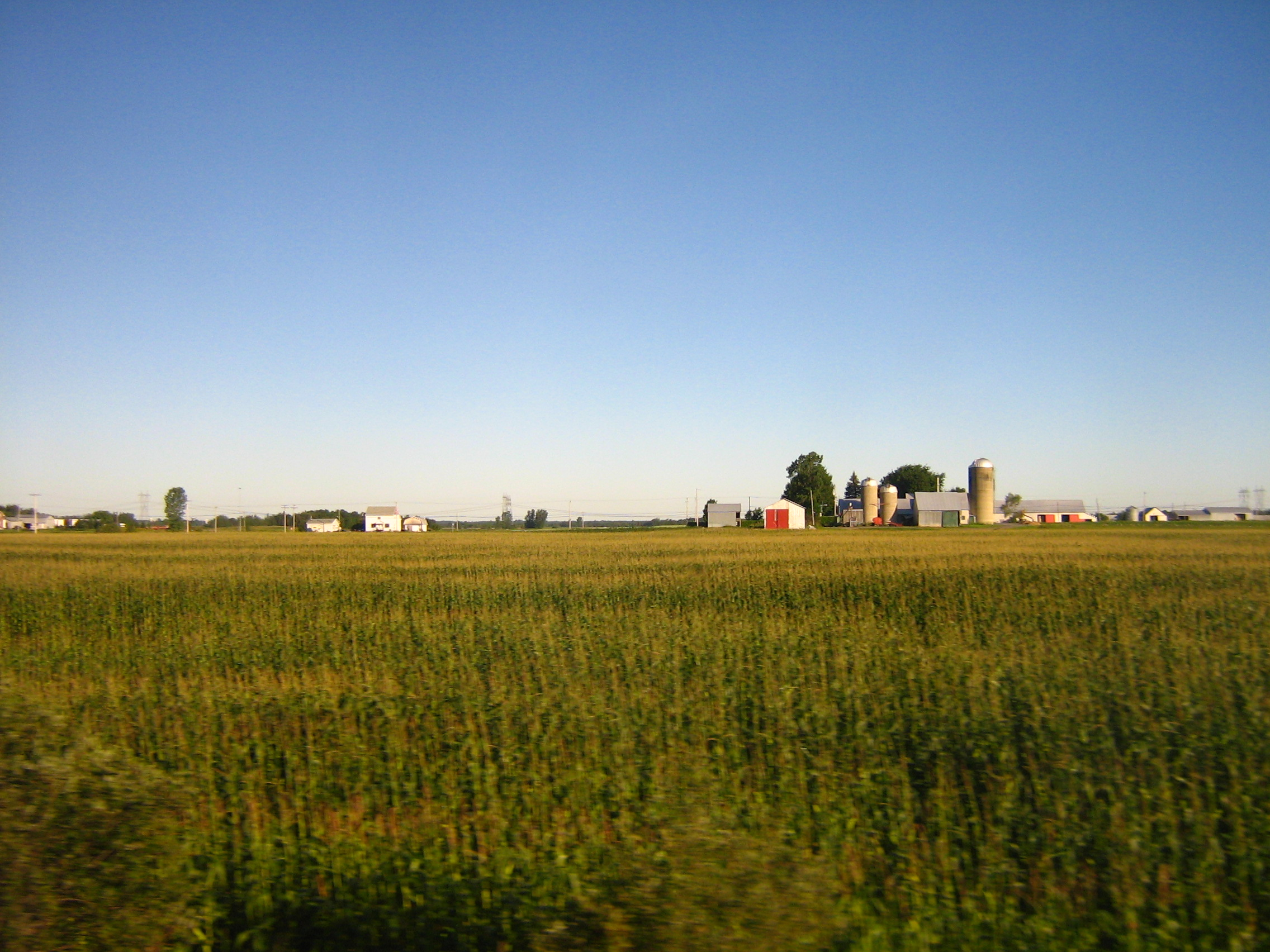
Open farmland—A typical scene in the Centre-du-Québec.

The Centre-du-Québec region was established as an independent administrative region of Quebec on July 30, 1997 (in effect August 20 upon publication in the Gazette officielle du Québec); prior to this date, it formed the southern portion of the Mauricie–Bois-Francs region (the northern part of which is now known simply as Mauricie).

Centre-du-Québec is not located in the geographic centre of Quebec, though it is approximately located in the centre of the southern portion of the province. Some consider the name Bois-Francs to be synonymous with the Centre-du-Québec region; others see it as being synonymous with Arthabaska Regional County Municipality, with its main city Victoriaville earning the title Capitale des Bois-Francs ('capital of the Bois-Francs').

The Centre-du-Québec is a primarily agricultural region known as the breadbasket of Quebec; major products include livestock and poultry, dairy products (the region produces more dairy products than all of Canada’s maritime provinces combined), as well as food crops such as cereals, vegetables, and fruits such as apples and cranberries. The city of Plessisville, located in the region, is known for its maple syrup production and is known as the Maple Capital of the World (Capitale Mondiale de l’Érable). Forestry is also a major industry; the name "Bois-Francs" refers to the French term for hardwood, referring to the high density of hardwood forests in the area. Other major industries of the area include transportation, recycling, woodworking and cabinetmaking.

The Centre-du-Québec region derives great benefit from its central location; major centres such as Montreal and Quebec City are within an hour and a half's drive, while secondary centres such as Sherbrooke and Trois-Rivières are close at hand. The region borders Mauricie, right across the St. Lawrence River, to the north, Montérégie to the west, Chaudière-Appalaches to the east and Estrie to the south. The Laviolette Bridge, which connects the region to Trois-Rivières, is located in Bécancour and is the only structure in Quebec located in between Montreal and Quebec City that connects both the north and south shores of the St. Lawrence.

== Administrative divisions ==
=== Regional county municipalities ===
Regional County Municipality (RCM)	Population Canada 2016 Census	Land Area	Density (pop. per km^{2})	Seat of RCM
Arthabaska	72,014	1,890.18 km^{2} (729.80 sq mi)	38.1	Victoriaville
Bécancour	20,404	1,144.67 km^{2} (441.96 sq mi)	17.85	Bécancour
Drummond	103,397	1,600.26 km^{2} (617.86 sq mi)	64.6	Drummondville
L'Érable	23,366	1,286.81 km^{2} (496.84 sq mi)	18.2	Plessisville
Nicolet-Yamaska	23,159	1,007.09 km^{2} (388.84 sq mi)	23.0	Nicolet

=== Indian reserves ===
The Centre-du-Québec region is home to several thousand members of the Wabanaki Nation. They are scattered throughout the region, with two major population centres:

- Odanak
- Wôlinak

== Major communities ==
- Bécancour
- Daveluyville
- Drummondville
- Nicolet
- Pierreville
- Plessisville
- Princeville
- Saint-Christophe-d'Arthabaska
- Saint-Cyrille-de-Wendover
- Saint-Germain-de-Grantham
- Saint-Léonard-d'Aston
- Victoriaville
- Warwick
- Wickham

== Highways ==
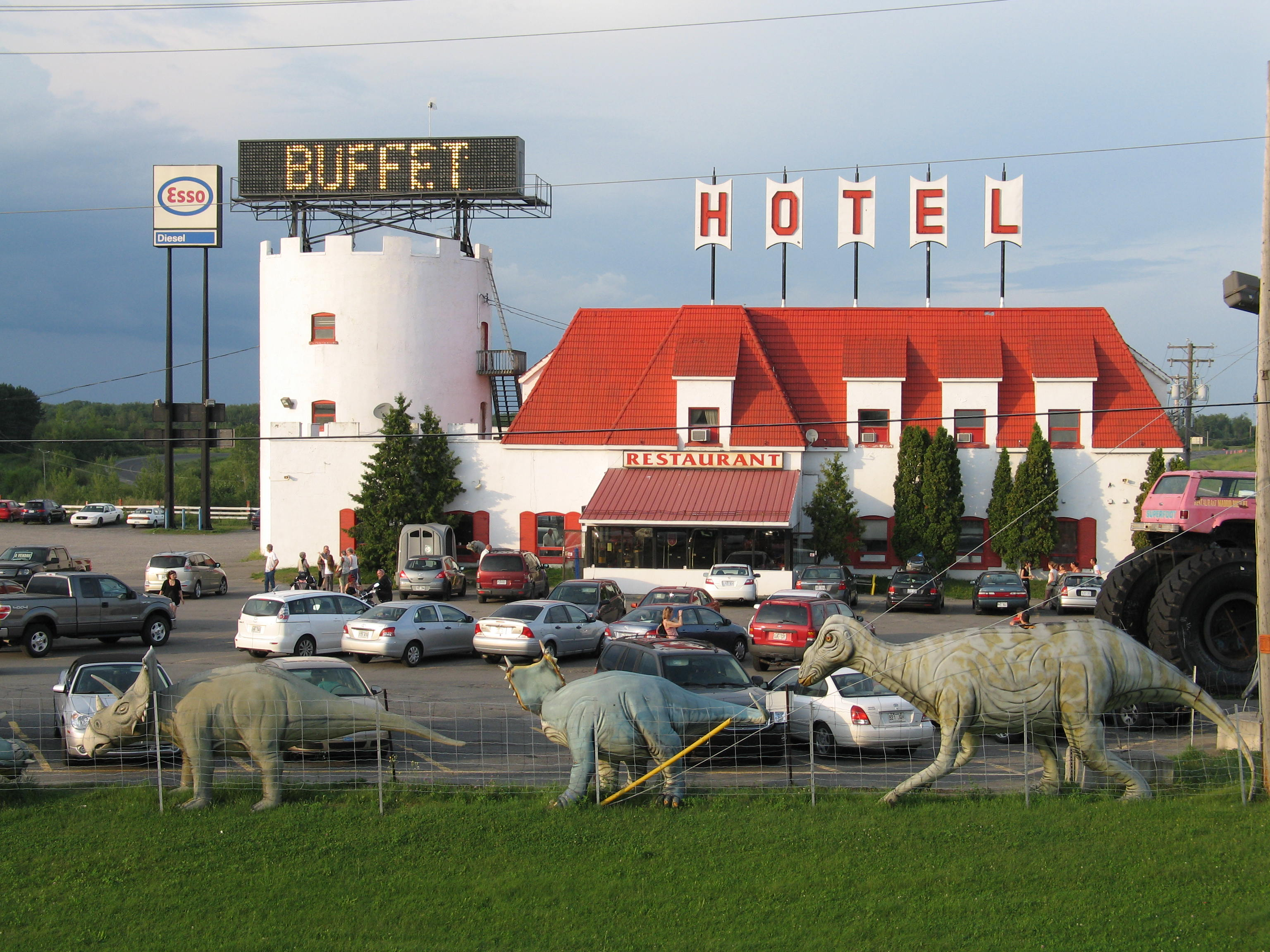
Le Madrid Restaurant in Saint-Léonard-d'Aston, at exit 202 of Autoroute 20/Autoroute 55.

The highways and roads that serve the region are:

- Autoroute 20
- Autoroute 30
- Autoroute 55
- Autoroute 955
- Route 116
- Route 122
- Route 132
- Route 139
- Route 143
- Route 161
- Route 243
- Route 255
- Route 265

== See also ==
- List of regions of Quebec
- Quebec municipal elections, 2005, results in Centre-du-Québec
