= 2025 Arthabaska provincial by-election =

Provincial by-election in Quebec, Canada

- August 11, 2025

Riding of Arthabaska
- Turnout: 59.98% (▼14.12pp)
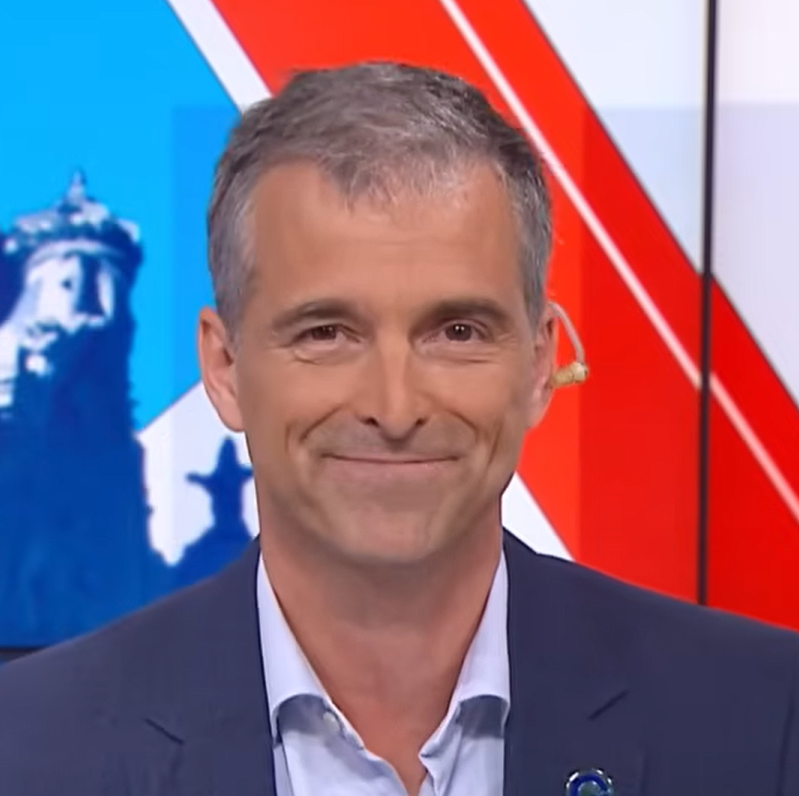

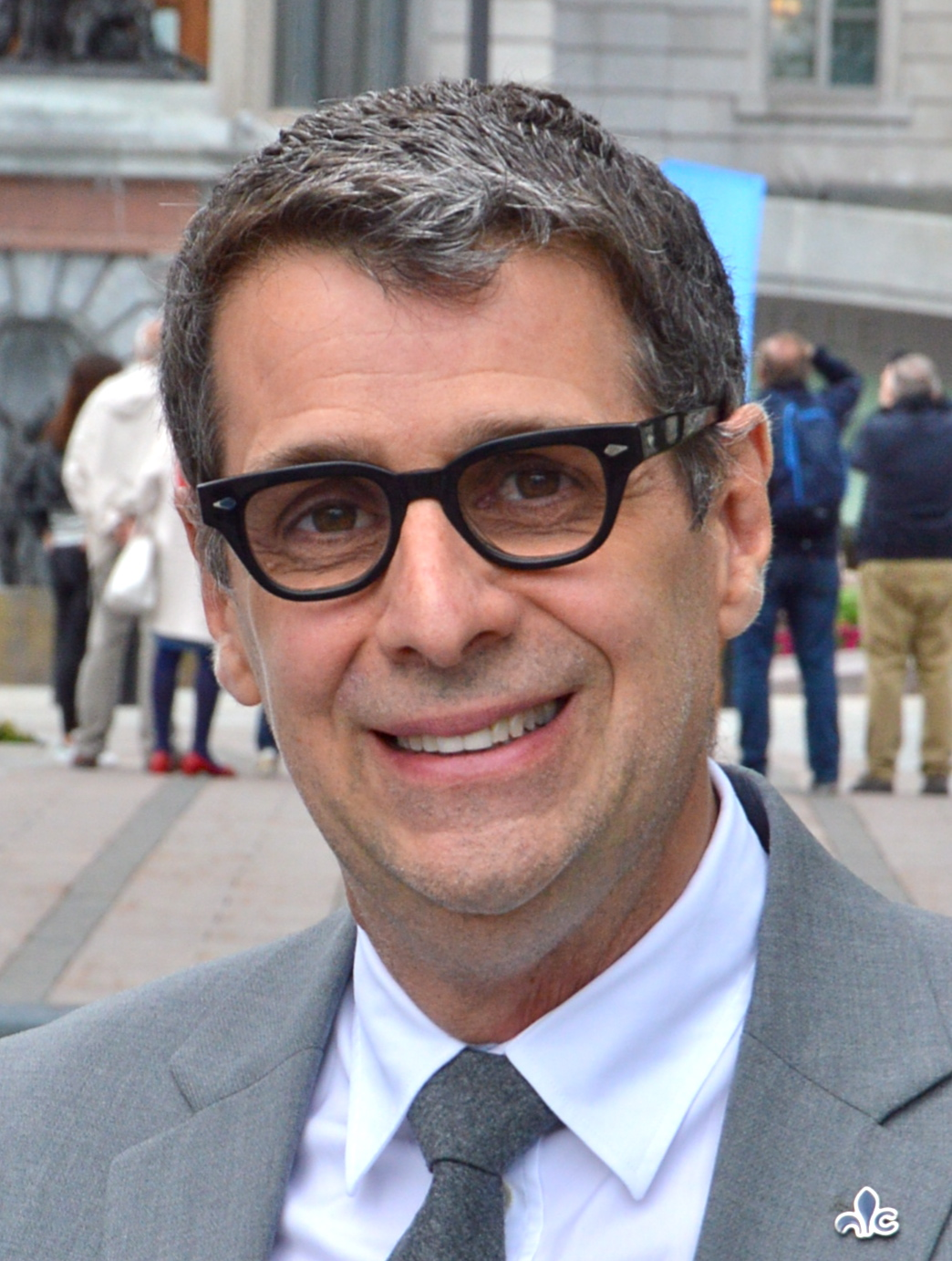
	First party	Second party
Candidate	Alex Boissonneault	Éric Duhaime
Party	Parti Québécois	Conservative
Popular vote	17,327	13,081
Percentage	46.37%	35.01%
Swing	▲36.36%	▲10.32%
	Third party	Fourth party
	PLQ	CAQ
Candidate	Chantale Marchand	Keven Brasseur
Party	Liberal	Coalition Avenir Québec
Popular vote	3,481	2,693
Percentage	9.32%	7.21%
Swing	▲5.56%	▼44.54%
MNA before election
Vacant (Note: The seat has been vacant since Eric Lefebvre resigned on 18 March 2025 to run in the federal electoral district of Richmond—Arthabaska.)
Elected MNA
Alex Boissonneault
Parti Québécois

The 2025 Arthabaska provincial by-election was held on August 11, 2025. The seat was represented by Eric Lefebvre of the CAQ until he resigned on 18 March 2025 to run for the partially-overlapping federal riding of Richmond—Arthabaska in the 2025 Canadian federal election.

In an attempt to win a seat in the National Assembly, Conservative Party of Quebec leader Éric Duhaime ran as a candidate in the by-election; he finished second behind the Parti Québécois' Alex Boissonneault. It was a recent stronghold for the Coalition Avenir Québec before Boissonneault became the first member of the Parti Québécois to be elected in the riding since 1998.

== Background ==
The seat is located in the Centre-du-Québec region of Quebec; it notably includes municipalities of Victoriaville, Plessisville, Princeville, and Saint-Christophe-d'Arthabaska.

The by-election is considered a test of leadership for Premier François Legault. A major issue is the United States trade war with Canada and Mexico.

The writ for the by-election was drawn up on July 8.

== Candidates ==
- Alex Boissonneault, Parti Québécois
- Keven Brasseur, Coalition Avenir Québec
- Chantale Marchand, Quebec Liberal Party
- Pascale Fortin, Québec solidaire
- Éric Duhaime, Conservative Party of Quebec
- Trystan Martel, Climat Québec
- Éric Simard, Union nationale
- Louis Chandonnet, Équipe autonomiste
- Denis Gagné, Independent
- Arpad Nagy, Independent

== Result ==
Quebec provincial by-election, August 11, 2025: Arthabaska Resignation of Eric Lefebvre
Party	Candidate	Votes	%	±%
Parti Québécois	Alex Boissonneault	17,327	46.37	+36.36
Conservative	Éric Duhaime	13,081	35.01	+10.32
Liberal	Chantale Marchand	3,481	9.32	+5.56
Coalition Avenir Québec	Keven Brasseur	2,693	7.21	-44.54
Québec solidaire	Pascale Fortin	548	1.47	-7.76
Climat Québec	Trystan Martel	96	0.26	-0.31
Union Nationale	Eric Simard	55	0.15	–
Équipe Autonomiste	Louis Chandonnet	31	0.08	–
Independent	Denis Gagné	29	0.08	–
Independent	Arpad Nagy	24	0.06	–
Total valid votes		37,365	98.95	
Total rejected ballots		398	1.05	-0.51
Turnout		37,763	59.98	-14.12
Eligible voters		62,960	–	+1.35
Parti Québécois gain from Coalition Avenir Québec		Swing		+40.45

== Previous result ==
2022 Quebec general election: Arthabaska
Party	Candidate	Votes	%	±%
Coalition Avenir Québec	Eric Lefebvre	23,447	51.75	-10.09
Conservative	Tarek Henoud	11,187	24.69	+22.36
Parti Québécois	Mario Beauchesne	4,538	10.02	+0.62
Québec solidaire	Pascale Fortin	4,179	9.22	-3.35
Liberal	Luciana Arantes	1,702	3.76	-7.60
Climat Québec	Trystan Martel	256	0.57	–
Total valid votes		45,309	98.44	–
Total rejected ballots		720	1.56	-0.31
Turnout		46,029	74.10	+4.61
Electors on the lists		62,120	–	–
Coalition Avenir Québec hold		Swing		-16.22
