= Alain Rayes =

Canadian politician (born 1970)

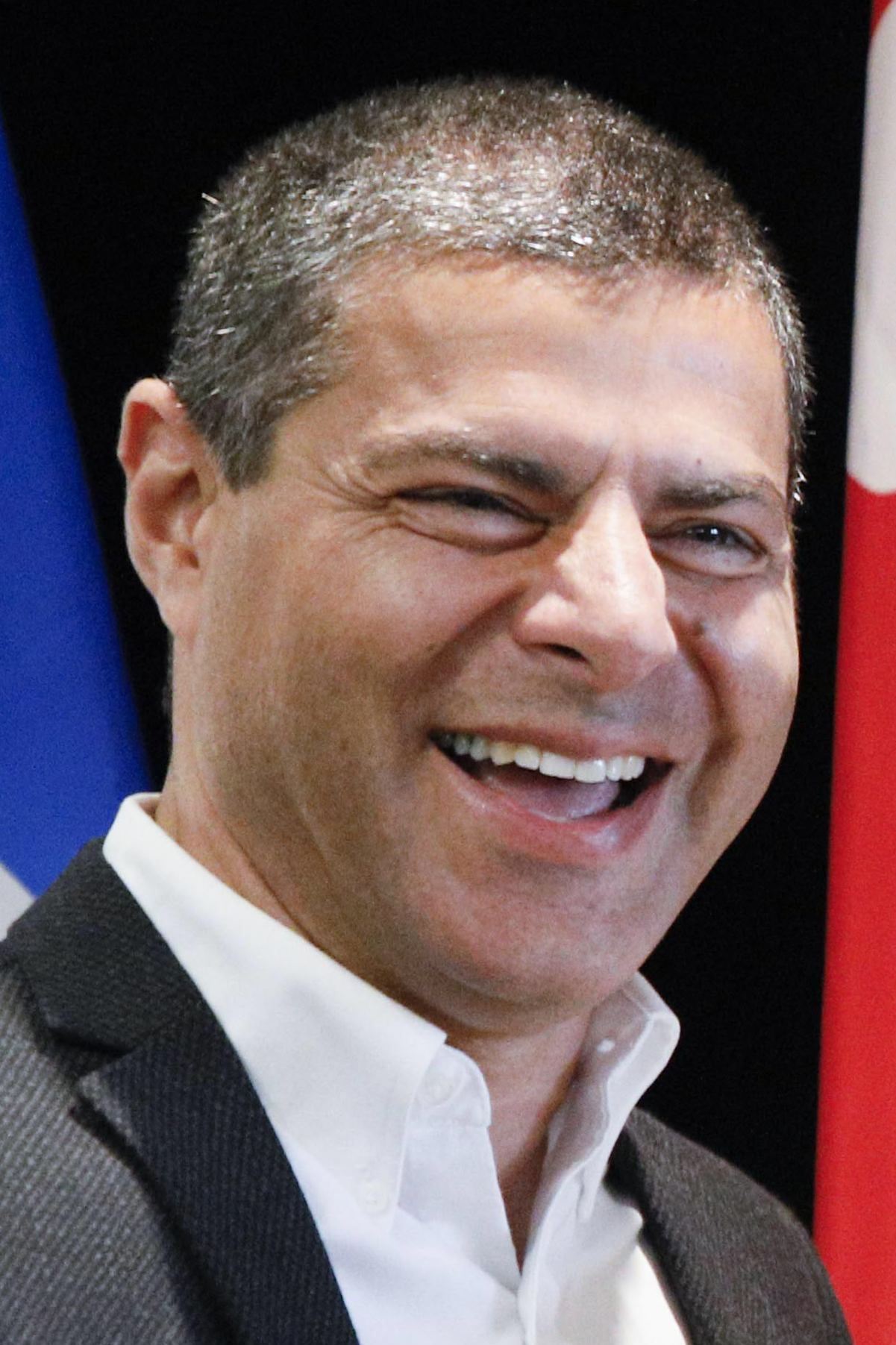

Conservative Party Quebec Lieutenant
- In office November 8, 2021 – February 6, 2022
- Leader: Erin O'Toole; Candice Bergen (interim)
- Preceded by: Richard Martel
- Succeeded by: Luc Berthold
- In office July 20, 2017 – September 2, 2020
- Leader: Andrew Scheer; Erin O'Toole
- Preceded by: Denis Lebel
- Succeeded by: Richard Martel

Mayor of Victoriaville
- In office November 2, 2009 – January 1, 2015
- Preceded by: Roger Richard
- Succeeded by: Christian Lettre (interim)

Member of Parliament for Richmond—Arthabaska
- In office October 19, 2015 – March 23, 2025
- Preceded by: André Bellavance
- Succeeded by: Éric Lefebvre

Shadow cabinet posts
- 2021–2022: Shadow Minister for Official Languages
- 2020–2021: Shadow Minister for Canadian Heritage, Official Languages & Quebec Economic Development
- 2017–2019: Shadow Minister for Intergovernmental Affairs

Personal details
- Born: December 11, 1971 (age 54) Victoriaville, Quebec, Canada
- Party: Independent (federal, 2022–present); CAQ (provincial)
- Other political affiliations: Conservative (federal, 2015–2022); ADQ (provincial, 2003–2012)

Alain Rayes (born December 11, 1971) is a Canadian politician, who represented the riding of Richmond—Arthabaska in the House of Commons of Canada from the 2015 Canadian federal election until 2025. He was reelected in the 2019 and 2021 elections. He left the Conservative Party of Canada after Pierre Poilievre's leadership victory in 2022 and sat for the rest of his term as an independent MP. From 2017 to 2019 and 2021 to 2022, Rayes served as Quebec lieutenant under Conservative leaders Andrew Scheer and Erin O'Toole.

Before federal politics, Rayes served for six years as the mayor of Victoriaville.

== Biography ==
Alain Rayes is a native of Victoriaville, He is the eldest of four children of a family originally from Egypt. He earned a bachelor of mathematics, specialising in teaching computer science, and later a masters in educational administration. He began his career as a teacher before obtaining management positions, including Director of the Polyvalente Le Boisé Victoriaville.

== Provincial and municipal politics ==
Rayes began his political career as a candidate for the ADQ alongside Mario Dumont, finishing second in Arthabaska during the 2003 Quebec general election. He transitioned to municipal politics and was elected mayor of Victoriaville in Quebec's 2009 municipal elections, and was reelected in 2013 by acclamation.

Under Rayes' mayoralty in Victoriaville, activities included the construction of the cultural venue "Le Carré 150" Pool Édouard-Dubord, of Yvon-Paré Stadium, Gateway Beaudet reservoir, the park's entertainment site at the youth baseball place of Victoriaville Stadium, Sani-Marc sports Complex and the sport Complex Promutuel.

== Federal politics ==
After six years as mayor, Rayes decided to enter federal politics and was elected in October 2015 as the Conservative member for Richmond-Arthabaska. Upon his election as MP, he was appointed deputy spokesman for Public Safety and Emergency Preparedness. Within this portfolio, Rayes was in charge of the marijuana legalization issue. His public interventions were on the issue of electoral reform as he was identified with Gérard Deltell, among the official spokesmen of the party on this issue. Then in July 2016, Rona Ambrose, the interim leader of the Conservative Party, assigned him as deputy spokesman for Foreign Affairs before becoming spokesman partner on infrastructure, communities and Urban Affairs in September and entering the shadow cabinet.

After Andrew Scheer won the 2017 Conservative Party of Canada leadership election, Rayes served as his Quebec lieutenant from 2017 to 2019. On September 2, 2020, Rayes was succeeded by Richard Martel as the party's Quebec lieutenant. Rayes returned to the role on November 8, 2021, and served until resigning on February 6, 2022 in order to play a role in the Conservative leadership election.

On September 13, 2022, Rayes left the Conservative caucus following Pierre Poilievre's victory in the leadership race on September 10, 2022. Rayes said that his values were incompatible with the new leadership and that he self-identified as a "Progressive Conservative". He sat as an independent in the House until the end of the Parliament. On September 14, 2022, Rayes told the National Post that he suspected that Poilievre's leadership team tried to intimidate Rayes by sending text messages to Conservative members of Richmond-Arthabaska in order to pressure Rayes into resigning his seat. Within the same day, the party admitted guilt and apologized to the members of the riding by sending a tweet but not directly apologizing to Rayes. The next day, Rayes released a statement on Twitter noting the apology was not directed personally towards him but "will let the population judge their message" and wants to move on from leaving the party. In Léa Clermont-Dion's documentary, "La peur au ventre," he also revealed that another reason that factor in leaving the party which is the growing influence of anti-abortion activists within the party. Rayes states that the Conservative party leader pays lip service to them despite publicly opposing any attempt to restrict abortion.

A year later, Rayes announced that he was not running in the upcoming election and would leave politics.

== Electoral record ==
=== Federal ===
2021 Canadian federal election
Party	Candidate	Votes	%	±%
Conservative	Alain Rayes	28,513	49.9	+4.6
Bloc Québécois	Diego Scalzo	14,150	24.8	-3.4
Liberal	Alexandre Desmarais	8,543	14.9	-0.2
New Democratic	Nataël Bureau	2,550	4.5	-0.4
People's	Nadine Fougeron	2,058	3.6	+2.4
Free	Louis Richard	897	1.6	N/A
Rhinoceros	Marjolaine Delisle	448	0.8	N/A
Total valid votes		57,159	98.1	
Total rejected ballots		1,125	1.9	
Turnout		58,284	66.3	
Eligible voters		87,942		
Conservative hold		Swing		+4.0
Source: Elections Canada

2019 Canadian federal election: Richmond—Arthabaska
Party	Candidate	Votes	%	±%	Expenditures
Conservative	Alain Rayes	26,553	45.3	+13.70	$62,920.65
Bloc Québécois	Olivier Nolin	16,539	28.2	+11.00	none listed
Liberal	Marc Patry	8,868	15.1	-9.60	$14,690.80
Green	Laura Horth-Lepage	3,133	5.3	+3.60	none listed
New Democratic	Olivier Guérin	2,864	4.9	-19.30	$0.33
People's	Jean Landry	681	1.2	-	$462.33
Total valid votes/expense limit		58,638	100.0		
Total rejected ballots		1,077			
Turnout		59,715	68.8		
Eligible voters		86,741			
Conservative hold		Swing		+1.35	
Source: Elections Canada

2015 Canadian federal election: Richmond—Arthabaska
Party	Candidate	Votes	%	±%	Expenditures
Conservative	Alain Rayes	18,505	31.6	+6.9	–
Liberal	Marc Desmarais	14,463	24.7	+17.7	–
New Democratic	Myriam Beaulieu	14,213	24.2	-8.3	–
Bloc Québécois	Olivier Nolin	10,068	17.2	-16.6	–
Green	Laurier Busque	984	1.7	-0.4	–
Rhinoceros	Antoine Dubois	384	0.7	–	–
Total valid votes/Expense limit		–	100.0		$223,651.10
Total rejected ballots		–	–	–	
Turnout		–	–	–	
Eligible voters		85,118			
Conservative gain from Bloc Québécois		Swing		-5.40	
Source: Elections Canada

=== Provincial ===
2003 Quebec general election: Arthabaska
Party	Candidate	Votes	%
Liberal	Claude Bachand	12,663	36.77
Action démocratique	Alain Rayes	11,389	33.07
Parti Québécois	Danièle Caron	9,657	28.04
Green	François Houle	379	1.10
Bloc Pot	Karine Cyr	353	1.02
Total valid votes		34,441	99.15
Total rejected ballots		269	0.85
Turnout		34,737	73.58
Electors on the lists		47,185	–

=== Municipal ===
2013 Victoriaville mayoral election
Candidate	Vote	%
Alain Rayes (X)	Acclaimed	

2009 Victoriaville mayoral election
Candidate	Vote	%
Alain Rayes	10,807	62.8
Éric Lefebvre	5,722	33.2
Martin Talbot	524	3.0
René Martineau	161	0.9
