= Joseph-Éna Girouard =

Canadian politician (1855–1937)

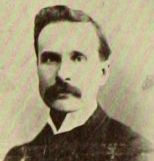

Member of the Legislative Assembly of Quebec for Drummond-Arthabaska
- In office 1886–1890
- Preceded by: William John Watts
- Succeeded by: District abolished

Member of the Legislative Assembly of Quebec for Arthabaska
- In office 1890–1898
- Preceded by: District created
- Succeeded by: Paul Tourigny

Personal details
- Born: June 17, 1855 Stanfold (Princeville), Canada East
- Died: December 2, 1937 (aged 82) Arthabaska, Quebec
- Children: Wilfrid Girouard

Joseph-Éna Girouard (June 17, 1855 – December 2, 1937) was a Canadian notary, lawyer and political figure. He represented the Drummond-Arthabaska and Arthabaska districts in the Legislative Assembly of Quebec beginning in 1886 and was appointed to the Yukon Territorial Council in 1898.

== Early life ==
Born in Stanfold, Canada East, the son of Urbain Girouard and Rosalie Brunelle, Girouard was educated at the commercial college in Princeville and the Séminaire de Nicolet.

== Career ==
He articled with Louis Lavergne, qualified as a notary in 1881 and set up practice in Drummondville. Girouard became manager of the Banque Jacques-Cartier in 1887. In 1897, he was admitted to the Quebec bar and set up a practice in Arthabaska. Girouard was secretary-treasurer for Grantham from 1882 to 1897 and for Arthabaska. He was mayor of Drummondville from 1889 to 1897.

Girouard was first elected to the Quebec assembly in an 1886 by-election held after William John Watts resigned his seat. He resigned his seat in the assembly in 1898 to become registrar for the Yukon territory. He served as a member of the Yukon council from 1898 to 1908. Girouard returned to the practice of law in Montreal in 1908. He was sheriff for Arthabaska district from 1916 to 1936. He died at Arthabaska at the age of 82.

== Personal life ==
Girouard was married three times: to Emma E. Watkins in 1882, to Cléophée Marcil in 1917 and to Régina Smith in 1926. His son Wilfrid served in the Quebec assembly and the Canadian House of Commons.
