= Trash radio =

Type of radio station

In the Canadian province of Quebec, trash radio (French: radio poubelle) refers to a type of shock jock radio stations that have existed since the 1970s. Originally stemming from Québec City, trash radio stations are known to espouse right-wing views on topics including immigration, feminism, and multiculturalism.

== History ==
In 2012, the sortons les radios-poubelles ('take out the trash radio') coalition formed in opposition to trash radio. In 2016, they were legally theathened by Radio X to shut down its YouTube and Facebook pages. Fillion offered a $1,000 reward for any listener who can help unmask the people behind Sortons les radio poubelle after he was reprimanded by the Quebec press council for trivializing violence against indigneous women.

Public scrutiny of trash radio intensified in 2017 following the Quebec City mosque shooting. Following the attack, which resulted in the deaths of six worshippers at the Islamic Cultural Centre of Quebec City, trash radio was accused of promoting a "culture of intolerance in Quebec". A Quebec City school board's effort to prohibit drivers from listening to talk radio stations in the aftermath of the attacks was ultimately cancelled.

Nevertheless, it was reported in 2018 by the Montreal Gazette that trash radio's popularity and political impact was as strong as ever a year after the attacks. During the COVID-19 pandemic in Quebec, radio poubelle broadcasters were critical of mitigation measures undertaken prime minister Justin Trudeau and premier François Legault.

== Personalities ==
Radio host André Arthur (1943 – 2022) has been credited as the "godfather" of radio poubelle. Beginning in 1970, Arthur emerged as a popular radio host in Québec City, where derogatory comments about Arab drivers and Creole languages led him to face legal scrutiny in the 1990s. During the 1990s, Arthur was noted for having "a particular venom about Quebec separatists", including Bloc Québécois' then-leader Lucien Bouchard. In the 2006 federal election, Arthur leveraged his on-air popularity to win a seat in the House of Commons, becoming an independent MP for Portneuf—Jacques-Cartier. Arthur was ultimately dropped from the airwaves following public outcry over homophobic comments in 2018.

Jeff Fillon, who has credited American radio personalities Rush Limbaugh and Howard Stern as influences, has been described as one of the leading radio poubelle personalities. Fillon was described as "the king of trash radio in Quebec" by The Globe and Mail in 2005.

Éric Duhaime, a radio commentator associated with the radio poubelle genre, was elected leader of the Conservative Party of Quebec in the 2021 leadership election. Dominique "Doom" Dumas, an associate of Fillon was announced to be the Conservative Party of Quebec for the riding of Chutes-de-la-Chaudière for the 2026 Quebec Election. François Gariépy, a former Radio X journalist was announced to be Parti Québécois candidate in Charlevoix–Côte-de-Beaupré.

== See also ==
- Conservative talk radio
- Conservatism in Canada
- Shock jock
