= Arthabaska–L'Érable =

Provincial electoral district in Quebec, Canada

Coordinates: 46.2207°N 71.773°W

Arthabaska-L'Érable
Quebec electoral district
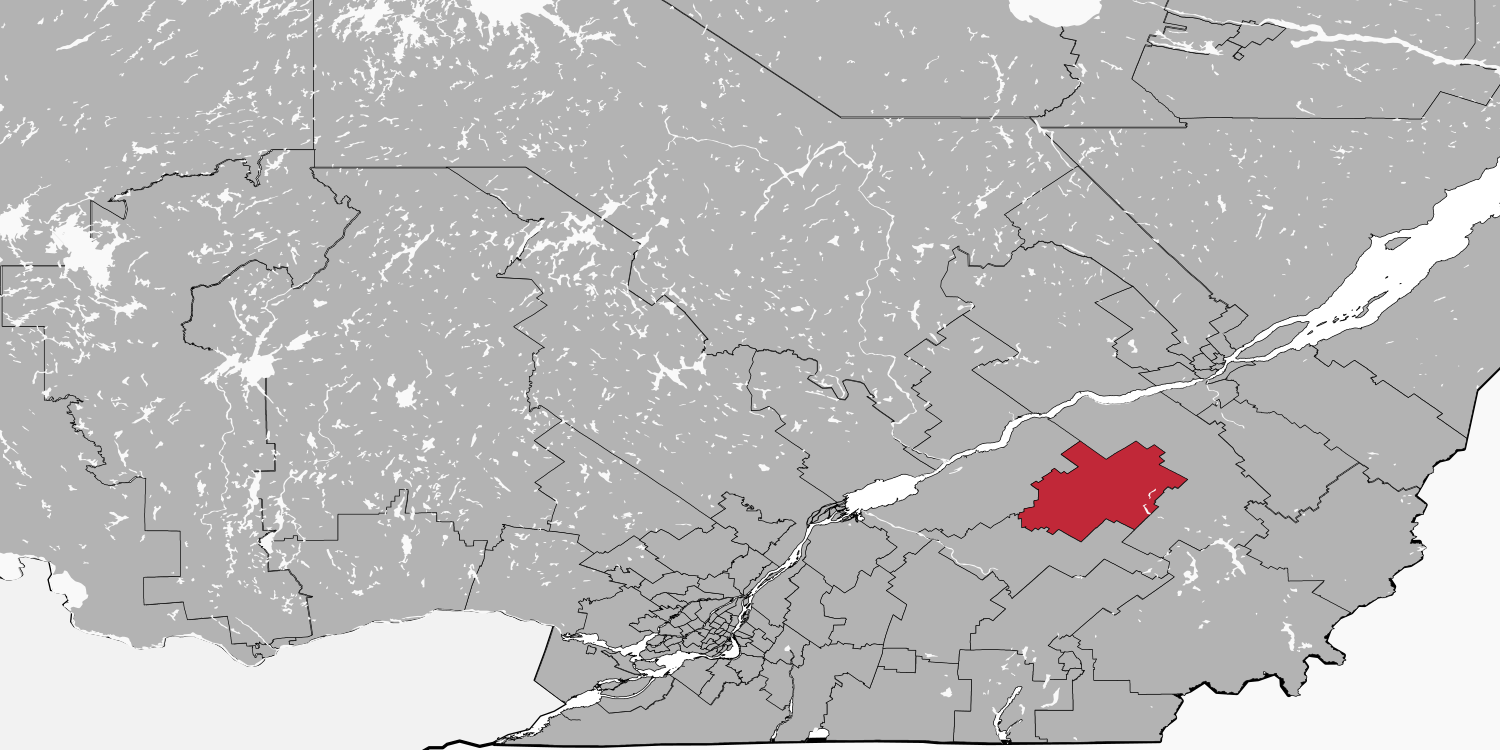

Provincial electoral district
- Legislature: National Assembly of Quebec
MNA
Tarek Henoud
Conservative
- District created: 1890
- First contested: 1890
- Last contested: 2026

Demographics
- Electors (2014): 59,032
- Area (km²): 1,881.4
- Census division(s): Arthabaska (part), L'Érable (part)
- Census subdivision(s): Inverness, Laurierville, Lyster, Notre-Dame-de-Lourdes, Plessisville, Princeville, Saint-Christophe-d'Arthabaska, Saint-Ferdinand, Saint-Norbert-d'Arthabaska, Saint-Pierre-Baptiste, Sainte-Hélène-de-Chester, Sainte-Sophie-d'Halifax, Saint-Valère, Victoriaville, Villeroy

Arthabaska-L'Érable (formerly Arthabaska; French pronunciation: [aʁtabaska]) is a provincial electoral district in the Centre-du-Québec region of Quebec, Canada, that elects members to the National Assembly of Quebec. It notably includes municipalities of Victoriaville, Plessisville, Princeville, and Saint-Christophe-d'Arthabaska.

It was created for the 1890 election from a part of Drummond-Arthabaska electoral district.

In the change from the 2001 to the 2011 electoral map, Arthabaska-L'Érable lost Sainte-Hélène-de-Chester and Chesterville to the newly created Drummond–Bois-Francs electoral district, but gained nine municipalities from Lotbinière, which ceased to exist.

The seat was represented by Eric Lefebvre (CAQ) until he resigned on 18 March 2025 to run for the partially-overlapping federal riding of Richmond-Arthabaska. A by-election was held on 11 August 2025, which Alex Boissonneault (Parti Québécois) won.

In 2025, it lost Saint-Louis-de-Blandford and Saint-Rosaire, while gaining Sainte-Hélène-de-Chester.

== Members of the Legislative Assembly / National Assembly ==
Legislature	Years	Member	Party
Riding created from Drummond-Arthabaska
7th	1890–1892	Joseph-Éna Girouard	Liberal
8th	1892–1897	Joseph-Éna Girouard	Liberal
9th	1897–1898	Joseph-Éna Girouard	Liberal
10th	1900–1904	Paul Tourigny	Liberal
11th	1904–1908	Paul Tourigny	Liberal
12th	1908–1912	Paul Tourigny	Liberal
13th	1912–1916	Paul Tourigny	Liberal
14th	1916–1919	Joseph-Édouard Perrault	Liberal
15th	1919–1923	Joseph-Édouard Perrault	Liberal
16th	1923–1927	Joseph-Édouard Perrault	Liberal
17th	1927–1931	Joseph-Édouard Perrault	Liberal
18th	1931–1935	Joseph-Édouard Perrault	Liberal
19th	1935–1936	Joseph-Édouard Perrault	Liberal
20th	1936–1939	Joseph-David Gagné	Union Nationale
21st	1939–1942	Wilfrid Girouard	Liberal
22nd	1944–1948	Pierre-Horace Plourde	Liberal
23rd	1948–1952	Wilfrid Labbé	Union Nationale
24th	1952–1956	Wilfrid Labbé	Union Nationale
25th	1956–1960	Wilfrid Labbé	Union Nationale
26th	1960–1962	Albert Morissette	Liberal
27th	1962–1966	Albert Morissette	Liberal
28th	1966–1970	Roch Gardner	Union Nationale
29th	1970–1973	Jean-Gilles Massé	Liberal
30th	1973–1976	Jean-Gilles Massé	Liberal
31st	1976–1981	Jacques Baril	Parti Québécois
32nd	1981–1985	Jacques Baril	Parti Québécois
33rd	1985–1989	Laurier Gardner	Liberal
34th	1989–1994	Jacques Baril	Parti Québécois
35th	1994–1998	Jacques Baril	Parti Québécois
36th	1998–2003	Jacques Baril	Parti Québécois
37th	2003–2007	Claude Bachand	Liberal
38th	2007–2008	Jean-François Roux	Action démocratique
39th	2008–2012	Claude Bachand	Liberal
40th	2012–2014	Sylvie Roy	Coalition Avenir Québec
41st	2014–2015	Sylvie Roy	Coalition Avenir Québec
41st	2015–2016†	Sylvie Roy	Independent
41st	2016–2018	Eric Lefebvre	Coalition Avenir Québec
42nd	2018–2022	Eric Lefebvre	Coalition Avenir Québec
43rd	2022–2024	Eric Lefebvre	Coalition Avenir Québec
43rd	2024–2025	Eric Lefebvre	Independent
43rd	2025–2026	Alex Boissonneault	Parti Québécois
Arthabaska-L'Érable
44th	2026–Present	Tarek Henoud	Conservative

== Election results ==
2026 Quebec general election
** Preliminary results — Not yet official **
Party	Candidate	Votes	%	±%
Conservative	Tarek Henoud	18,432	40.55	+16.35
Parti Québécois	Alex Boissonneault	14,880	32.73	+22.70
Coalition Avenir Québec	Keven Brasseur	6,047	13.30	–38.92
Liberal	Thomas Guérette	3,431	7.55	+3.80
Québec solidaire	Stéphanie Poirier	2,293	5.04	–4.19
Green	Jonathan Croteau	296	0.65	N/A
Démocratie directe	Carol Filion	80	0.18	N/A
Total valid votes		45,459	98.69	+0.25
Total rejected ballots		604	1.31	–0.25
Turnout		46,063	74.39	+0.29
Electors on the lists		61,921		
Conservative gain from Parti Québécois		Swing		–3.18
Source: Élections Québec

2022 Quebec general election redistributed results
Party	Vote	%
Coalition Avenir Québec	22,142	52.22
Conservative	10,263	24.20
Parti Québécois	4,252	10.03
Québec solidaire	3,915	9.23
Liberal	1,592	3.75
Others	240	0.57

Quebec provincial by-election, August 11, 2025: Arthabaska Resignation of Eric Lefebvre
Party	Candidate	Votes	%	±%
Parti Québécois	Alex Boissonneault	17,327	46.37	+36.36
Conservative	Éric Duhaime	13,081	35.01	+10.32
Liberal	Chantale Marchand	3,481	9.32	+5.56
Coalition Avenir Québec	Keven Brasseur	2,693	7.21	-44.54
Québec solidaire	Pascale Fortin	548	1.47	-7.76
Climat Québec	Trystan Martel	96	0.26	-0.31
Union Nationale	Eric Simard	55	0.15	–
Équipe Autonomiste	Louis Chandonnet	31	0.08	–
Independent	Denis Gagné	29	0.08	–
Independent	Arpad Nagy	24	0.06	–
Total valid votes		37,365	98.95	
Total rejected ballots		398	1.05	-0.51
Turnout		37,763	59.98	-14.12
Eligible voters		62,960	–	+1.35
Parti Québécois gain from Coalition Avenir Québec		Swing		+40.45

2022 Quebec general election: Arthabaska
Party	Candidate	Votes	%	±%
Coalition Avenir Québec	Eric Lefebvre	23,447	51.75	-10.09
Conservative	Tarek Henoud	11,187	24.69	+22.36
Parti Québécois	Mario Beauchesne	4,538	10.02	+0.62
Québec solidaire	Pascale Fortin	4,179	9.22	-3.35
Liberal	Luciana Arantes	1,702	3.76	-7.60
Climat Québec	Trystan Martel	256	0.57	–
Total valid votes		45,309	98.44	–
Total rejected ballots		720	1.56	-0.31
Turnout		46,029	74.10	+4.61
Electors on the lists		62,120	–	–
Coalition Avenir Québec hold		Swing		-16.22

2018 Quebec general election: Arthabaska
Party	Candidate	Votes	%	±%
Coalition Avenir Québec	Eric Lefebvre	25,640	61.84	+17.88
Québec solidaire	William Champigny-Fortier	5,215	12.58	+8.97
Liberal	Pierre Poirier	4,707	11.35	-16.21
Parti Québécois	Jacques Daigle	3,897	9.40	-7.37
Conservative	Lisette Guay Gaudreault	968	2.33	-2.37
Green	Jean-Charles Pelland	620	1.50	-0.61
Alliance provinciale	Jean Landry	418	1.01	–
Total valid votes		41,465	98.13	
Total rejected ballots		791	1.87	+0.85
Turnout		42,256	69.49	+26.35
Eligible voters		60,808		
Coalition Avenir Québec hold		Swing		+4.46
Source(s) "Rapport des résultats officiels du scrutin". Élections Québec.

Quebec provincial by-election, December 5, 2016 Death of Sylvie Roy
Party	Candidate	Votes	%	±%
Coalition Avenir Québec	Eric Lefebvre	11,316	43.96	-1.53
Liberal	Luc Dastous	7,095	27.56	-2.65
Parti Québécois	Jacques Daigle	4,318	16.77	-0.30
Conservative	Guy Morin	1,210	4.70	+3.59
Québec solidaire	Sarah Beaudoin	926	3.61	-1.60
Green	Alex Tyrrell	543	2.11	+1.21
Option nationale	Émilie Charbonneau	160	0.62	–
Parti indépendantiste	Christine Lavoie	115	0.45	–
Équipe Autonomiste	Suzanne Cantin	58	0.23	–
Total valid votes		25,744	98.98	
Total rejected ballots		265	1.02	-0.41
Turnout		26,009	43.14	-30.13
Electors on the lists		60,285		
Coalition Avenir Québec hold		Swing		+0.56

2014 Quebec general election
Party	Candidate	Votes	%	±%
Coalition Avenir Québec	Sylvie Roy	19,393	45.49	+3.07
Liberal	Luc Dastous	12,881	30.21	-0.17
Parti Québécois	Gaëtan St-Arnaud	7,278	17.07	-2.98
Québec solidaire	Christine Letendre	2,222	5.21	+1.25
Conservative	Jean Landry	475	1.11	+0.41
Green	François Fillion	385	0.9	-0.21
Total valid votes		42,634	98.57	–
Total rejected ballots		620	1.43	+0.18
Turnout		43,254	73.27	-4.79
Electors on the lists		59,032	–	–
Coalition Avenir Québec hold		Swing		+1.62

2012 Quebec general election
Party	Candidate	Votes	%	±%
Coalition Avenir Québec	Sylvie Roy	19,016	42.42	+15.12
Liberal	Claude Bachand	13,623	30.39	-11.23
Parti Québécois	Lucie Lebrun	8,991	20.05	-6.90
Québec solidaire	Christine Letendre	1,775	3.96	+1.73
Option nationale	Rémi Martineau	519	1.16	–
Green	François Fillion	501	1.12	-0.79
Independents	Jean Landry	316	0.70	–
Quebec Citizens' Union	Eric Lafontaine	91	0.20	–
Total valid votes		44,832	98.74	–
Total rejected ballots		570	1.26	
Turnout		45,402	78.07	
Electors on the lists		58,158	–	–
Coalition Avenir Québec notional gain from Liberal		Swing		+13.17

^ Change is from redistributed results; CAQ gain from ADQ

2008 Quebec general election redistributed results
Party	Vote	%
Liberal	14,674	41.62
Action démocratique	9,625	27.30
Parti Québécois	9,504	26.95
Québec solidaire	787	2.23
Green	671	1.90

2008 Quebec general election
Party	Candidate	Votes	%	±%
Liberal	Claude Bachand	13,304	42.55	+12.04
Parti Québécois	Catherine Coutel	8,794	28.13	+6.43
Action démocratique	Jean-François Roux	7,777	24.87	-17.00
Québec solidaire	Bill Ninacs	697	2.23	-0.86
Green	François Fillion	693	2.22	-0.62
Total valid votes		31,265	98.38	–
Total rejected ballots		516	1.62	+0.50
Turnout		31,781	63.96	-12.04
Electors on the lists		49,689	–	–
Liberal gain from Action démocratique		Swing		+14.52

2007 Quebec general election
Party	Candidate	Votes	%	±%
Action démocratique	Jean-François Roux	15,231	41.87	+8.80
Liberal	Claude Bachand	11,098	30.51	-6.26
Parti Québécois	Thérèse Domingue	7,892	21.70	-6.34
Québec solidaire	Bill Ninacs	1,125	3.09	–
Green	François Fillion	1,030	2.83	+1.73
Total valid votes		36,376	98.88	–
Total rejected ballots		412	1.12	+0.27
Turnout		36,788	76.00	+2.38
Electors on the lists		48,406	–	–
Action démocratique gain from Liberal		Swing		+7.53

2003 Quebec general election
Party	Candidate	Votes	%	±%
Liberal	Claude Bachand	12,663	36.77	+3.13
Action démocratique	Alain Rayes	11,389	33.07	+20.39
Parti Québécois	Danièle Caron	9,657	28.04	-25.65
Green	François Houle	379	1.10	–
Bloc Pot	Karine Cyr	353	1.02	–
Total valid votes		34,441	99.15	
Total rejected ballots		269	0.85	-0.56
Turnout		34,737	73.62	-7.44
Electors on the lists		47,185	–	
Liberal gain from Parti Québécois		Swing		-14.39

1998 Quebec general election
Party	Candidate	Votes	%	±%
Parti Québécois	Jacques Baril	19,469	53.69	-7.86
Liberal	Jacques Lamontagne	12,197	33.63	-0.62
Action démocratique	Jean Landry	4,597	12.68	–
Total valid votes		36,263	98.58	
Total rejected ballots		521	1.42	-0.92
Turnout		36,784	81.06	-0.17
Electors on the lists		45,380	–	
Parti Québécois hold		Swing		-3.62

1995 Quebec referendum
Side	Votes	%
Oui	22,235	56.35
Non	17,225	43.65

1994 Quebec general election
Party	Candidate	Votes	%	±%
Parti Québécois	Jacques Baril	20,577	61.55	+10.07
Liberal	Madeline Gosselin-Dusseault	11,451	34.25	-8.86
Independent	Bernard Jeansonne	905	2.71	-2.70
Natural Law	Robert Ouellet	369	1.10	–
Communist	William Bunge	130	0.39	–
Total valid votes		33,432	97.66	
Total rejected ballots		800	2.34	+0.15
Turnout		34,232	81.23	-0.43
Electors on the lists		42,142	–	
Parti Québécois hold		Swing		+9.47

1992 Charlottetown Accord referendum
Side	Votes	%
Non	21,608	64.62
Oui	11,833	35.38

1989 Quebec general election
Party	Candidate	Votes	%	±%
Parti Québécois	Jacques Baril	16,569	51.48	+7.76
Liberal	Laurier Gardner	13,877	43.11	-6.71
Independent	Bernard Jeansonne	1,741	5.41	+4.06
Total valid votes		32,187	97.81	
Total rejected ballots		721	2.19	+0.84
Turnout		32,908	81.66	+1.87
Electors on the lists		40,299	–	
Parti Québécois gain from Liberal		Swing		+7.24

1985 Quebec general election
Party	Candidate	Votes	%	±%
Liberal	Laurier Gardner	16,608	49.83	+11.63
Parti Québécois	Bruno Saint-Pierre	14,570	43.71	-9.93
Union Nationale	Gérard Bouillon	817	2.45	-5.19
New Democratic	Marcel Chalifoux	801	2.40	
Independent	Bernard Jeansonne	450	1.35	
Christian Socialism	Germain Laflamme	85	0.26	
Total valid votes		33,331	98.65	
Total rejected ballots		455	1.35	+0.61
Turnout		33,786	79.79	-5.71
Electors on the lists		42,346	–	
Liberal gain from Parti Québécois		Swing		+10.78

1981 Quebec general election
Party	Candidate	Votes	%	±%
Parti Québécois	Jacques Baril	18,424	53.64	+14.69
Liberal	Laurent Dubois	13,120	38.20	+10.10
Union Nationale	Conrad Beaudet	2,623	7.64	-15.91
Workers Communist	Michel Dumont	180	0.52	
Total valid votes		34,347	99.26	
Total rejected ballots		255	0.74	-1.15
Turnout		34,602	85.50	-3.86
Electors on the lists		40,470	–	
Parti Québécois hold		Swing		+2.29

1980 Quebec referendum
Side	Votes	%
Non	20,120	59.17
Oui	13,884	40.83

1976 Quebec general election
Party	Candidate	Votes	%	±%
Parti Québécois	Jacques Baril	12,465	38.95	+21.98
Liberal	Denis St-Pierre	8,991	28.10	-27.21
Union Nationale	Constant Roy	7,536	23.55	+18.99
Ralliement créditiste	Rosaire Rainville	3,009	9.40	-13.76
Total valid votes		32,001	98.11	
Total rejected ballots		616	1.89	+0.70
Turnout		32,617	89.36	+2.03
Electors on the lists		36,499	–	
Parti Québécois gain from Liberal		Swing		+24.60

1973 Quebec general election
Party	Candidate	Votes	%	±%
Liberal	Jean-Gilles Massé	16,275	55.30	+23.17
Ralliement créditiste	Jacques Nadeau	6,817	23.17	-8.00
Parti Québécois	Jean-Maurice Richard	4,994	16.97	+2.77
Union Nationale	Laurier Gardner	1,342	4.56	-17.50
Total valid votes		29,428	98.81	
Total rejected ballots		355	1.19	+0.07
Turnout		29,783	87.34	-2.55
Electors on the lists		34,101	–	
Liberal hold		Swing		+15.58

1970 Quebec general election
Party	Candidate	Votes	%	±%
Liberal	Jean-Gilles Massé	8,715	32.13	-12.22
Ralliement créditiste	Louis-David Paré	8,452	31.16	
Union Nationale	Roch Gardner	5,983	22.06	-22.75
Parti Québécois	Marcel Fréchette	3,852	14.20	+3.37 (Note: Change compared to combined Ralliement national and Rassemblement pour l'Indépendance Nationale vote)
Independent	J.-Noel Langlois	119	0.44	
Total valid votes		27,121	98.88	
Total rejected ballots		308	1.12	-2.97
Turnout		27,429	89.88	+4.02
Electors on the lists		30,516	–	
Liberal gain from Union Nationale		Swing		+5.27

1966 Quebec general election
Party	Candidate	Votes	%	±%
Union Nationale	Roch Gardner	10,188	44.81	-1.65
Liberal	Albert Morissette	10,084	44.36	-9.18
Ralliement national	René Jutras	1,871	8.23	
RIN	André Martel	591	2.60	
Total valid votes		22,734	95.91	
Total rejected ballots		970	4.09	+3.31
Turnout		23,704	85.86	-5.84
Electors on the lists		27,608	–	
Union Nationale gain from Liberal		Swing		+3.77

1962 Quebec general election
Party	Candidate	Votes	%	±%
Liberal	Albert Morissette	10,988	53.54	+0.45
Union Nationale	Joseph-George-Yvon Jutras	9,535	46.46	-0.28
Total valid votes		20,523	99.22	
Total rejected ballots		162	0.78	-0.05
Turnout		20,685	91.70	-1.82
Electors on the lists		22,557	–	
Liberal hold		Swing		+0.36

1960 Quebec general election
Party	Candidate	Votes	%	±%
Liberal	Albert Morissette	10,609	53.09	+7.83
Union Nationale	Wilfrid Labbé	9,340	46.74	-8.00
Independent Liberal	Joseph-Edmond-Edouard Gagnon	35	0.18	
Total valid votes		19,984	99.17	
Total rejected ballots		167	0.83	-0.28
Turnout		20,151	93.52	+0.80
Electors on the lists		21,547	–	
Liberal gain from Union Nationale		Swing		+7.92

1956 Quebec general election
Party	Candidate	Votes	%	±%
Union Nationale	Wilfrid Labbé	10,189	54.74	+1.43
Liberal	Albert Morissette	8,424	45.26	-1.43
Total valid votes		18,613	98.89	
Total rejected ballots		209	1.11	+0.01
Turnout		18,822	92.72	+1.56
Electors on the lists		20,299	–	
Union Nationale hold		Swing		+1.43

1952 Quebec general election
Party	Candidate	Votes	%	±%
Union Nationale	Wilfrid Labbé	9,003	53.31	-1.51
Liberal	Albert Morissette	7,884	46.69	+12.97
Total valid votes		16,887	98.90	
Total rejected ballots		188	1.10	+0.03
Turnout		17,075	91.17	+3.13
Electors on the lists		18,729	–	
Union Nationale hold		Swing		-7.24

1948 Quebec general election
Party	Candidate	Votes	%	±%
Union Nationale	Wilfrid Labbé	8,368	54.83	+14.27
Liberal	J.-Albert-Germain Lacoursière	5,146	33.72	-7.08
Union des électeurs	J.-Émile Ouellette	1,749	11.46	
Total valid votes		15,263	98.93	
Total rejected ballots		165	1.07	+0.52
Turnout		15,428	88.03	+2.03
Electors on the lists		17,525	–	
Union Nationale gain from Liberal		Swing		+10.68

1944 Quebec general election
Party	Candidate	Votes	%	±%
Liberal	Pierre-Horace Plourde	5,511	40.80	-15.74
Union Nationale	Wilfrid Labbé	5,478	40.55	-2.91
Bloc populaire	Raymond Beaudet	2,519	18.65	
Total valid votes		13,508	99.46	
Total rejected ballots		74	0.54	-0.46
Turnout		13,582	86.01	-0.39
Electors on the lists		15,792	–	
Liberal hold		Swing		-6.41

1939 Quebec general election
Party	Candidate	Votes	%	±%
Liberal	Wilfrid Girouard	3,448	56.53	+12.16
Union Nationale	Wilfrid Labbé	2,651	43.47	-12.16
Total valid votes		6,099	98.99	
Total rejected ballots		62	1.01	+0.52
Turnout		61,61	86.40	-2.12
Electors on the lists		7,131	–	
Liberal gain from Union Nationale		Swing		+12.16

1936 Quebec general election
Party	Candidate	Votes	%	±%
Union Nationale	Joseph-David Gagné	3,559	55.63	+24.99 (Note: Union nationale change compared to Conservative)
Liberal	Édouard Bourbeau	2,839	44.37	-24.99
Total valid votes		6,398	99.52	
Total rejected ballots		31	0.48	-0.00
Turnout		6,429	88.52	+4.40
Electors on the lists		7,263	–	
Union Nationale gain from Liberal		Swing		+24.99

1935 Quebec general election
Party	Candidate	Votes	%	±%
Liberal	Joseph-Édouard Perrault	4,143	69.36	+0.58
Conservative	Joseph-Étienne Gélinas	1,830	30.64	-0.58
Total valid votes		5,973	99.52	
Total rejected ballots		29	0.48	+0.16
Turnout		6,002	84.12	-0.74
Electors on the lists		7,135	–	
Liberal hold		Swing		+0.58

1931 Quebec general election
Party	Candidate	Votes	%
Liberal	Joseph-Édouard Perrault	3,590	68.79
Conservative	Bennett Feeney	1,629	31.21
Total valid votes		5,219	99.68
Total rejected ballots		17	0.32
Turnout		5,236	84.86
Electors on the lists		6,170	–

1927 Quebec general election
Party	Candidate	Votes	%
Liberal	Joseph-Édouard Perrault	3,141	83.18
Conservative	Gamelis Boulanger	635	16.82
Total valid votes		3,776	99.92
Total rejected ballots		3	0.08
Turnout		3,779	67.18
Electors on the lists		5,625	–

1923 Quebec general election
Party	Candidate	Votes	%
Liberal	Joseph-Édouard Perrault	2,663	68.58
Farmer	Gamelis Boulanger	1,220	31.42
Total valid votes		3,883	99.16
Total rejected ballots		33	0.84
Turnout		3,916	69.58
Electors on the lists		5,628	–

Quebec provincial by-election, 1919
Party	Candidate	Votes
Liberal	Joseph-Adolphe Tessier	Acclaimed

1919 Quebec general election
Party	Candidate	Votes
Liberal	Joseph-Adolphe Tessier	Acclaimed
Electors on the lists		5,498

1916 Quebec general election
Party	Candidate	Votes	%
Liberal	Joseph-Édouard Perrault	2,833	67.99
Conservative	Joseph-Cléophas Héon	1,334	32.01
Total valid votes		4,167	99.52
Total rejected ballots		20	0.48
Turnout		4,187	76.61
Electors on the lists		5,465	–

1912 Quebec general election
Party	Candidate	Votes	%
Liberal	Paul Tourigny	2,370	54.23
Conservative	Arthur Gilbert	2,000	45.77
Total valid votes		4,370	99.61
Total rejected ballots		17	0.39
Turnout		4,387	74.74
Electors on the lists		5,870	–

1908 Quebec general election
Party	Candidate	Votes	%
Liberal	Paul Tourigny	2,480	68.91
Conservative	Adolphe-Henri Daveluy	691	19.20
Independent	Wilfrid Fournier	428	11.89
Total valid votes		3,599	99.09
Total rejected ballots		33	0.91
Turnout		3,632	64.15
Electors on the lists		5,662	–

1904 Quebec general election
Party	Candidate	Votes
Liberal	Paul Tourigny	Acclaimed
Electors on the lists		5,300

1900 Quebec general election
Party	Candidate	Votes
Liberal	Paul Tourigny	Acclaimed
Electors on the lists		5,011

1897 Quebec general election
Party	Candidate	Votes	%
Liberal	Joseph-Éna Girouard	2,184	61.09
Conservative	Georges Gendreau	1,391	38.91
Total valid votes		3,575	99.83
Total rejected ballots		6	0.17
Turnout		3,581	72.58
Electors on the lists		4,934	–

1892 Quebec general election
Party	Candidate	Votes	%
Liberal	Joseph-Éna Girouard	1,539	51.63
Conservative	Félix Baril	1,442	48.37
Total valid votes		2,981	99.27
Total rejected ballots		22	0.73
Turnout		3,003	66.51
Electors on the lists		4,515	–

1890 Quebec general election
Party	Candidate	Votes	%
Liberal	Joseph-Éna Girouard	1,784	55.40
Conservative	Désiré-Olivier Bourbeau	1,436	44.60
Total valid votes		3,220	99.32
Total rejected ballots		22	0.68
Turnout		3,242	74.48
Electors on the lists		4,353	–

== See also ==
- List of Quebec provincial electoral districts
- Canadian provincial electoral districts
