= Jacques Baril =

Canadian politician

Member of the Quebec National Assembly for Arthabaska
- In office 1976–1985
- Preceded by: Jean-Gilles Massé
- Succeeded by: Laurier Gardner
- In office 1989–2003
- Preceded by: Laurier Gardner
- Succeeded by: Claude Bachand

Personal details
- Born: February 6, 1942 (age 84) Princeville, Quebec
- Party: Parti Québécois
- Children: 3
- Occupation: Farmer, mechanic

Jacques Baril (born February 6, 1942) is a Canadian politician who represented the riding of Arthabaska from 1976 to 1985 and again from 1989 to 2003 in the National Assembly of Quebec. A member of the Parti Québécois, he served as Minister of Transport from 1998 to 2001, and as Minister of Transport and Maritime Policy from 1998 to 2001.

== Early life ==
Jacques Baril was born in the town of Princeville, Quebec in 1942 to Paul-Émile Baril and Cécile Thiboutot. He was educated at l'École Sacré-Cœur de Princeville before working as a mechanic at a local garage. In 1966, he began working as a dairy farmer. It was his work as a farmer that opened the door to his political activities. Baril became the director of the Union of Agricultural Producers of Quebec in 1974. He was also the founder of the local beef cooperative in the Arthabaska region.

Later, he shifted his work toward municipal politics, serving as a municipal councillor in Princeville from 1973 to 1976 and organizing locally for the Parti Québécois.

== Member of the National Assembly ==
Baril was elected in the 1976 election, in which the Parti Québécois formed the government for the first time. He was handily re-elected four year later in the 1981 election. During his second term in office, Baril served as Deputy Whip for the Parti Québécois, as well as Parliamentary Assistant for the Minister of Agriculture.

Baril briefly retired in 1985 and served as mayor of Princeville from 1987 to 1989 and as a member of the executive committee for the L'Érable Regional County Municipality. It was also reported that he left provincial politics in protest of Pierre-Marc Johnson's "National Affirmation" policy.

He returned to politics in the 1989 election and was re-elected in the 1994 and 1998 elections. During the 36th Quebec Legislature, Baril served in cabinet, serving as Minister of Transport from 1998 to 2001, and as Minister of Transport and Maritime Policy from 1998 to 2001. In 2002, Baril announced he would not run again in the 2003 election.
