= Éric Duhaime =

Canadian politician (born 1969)

Éric Duhaime MNA
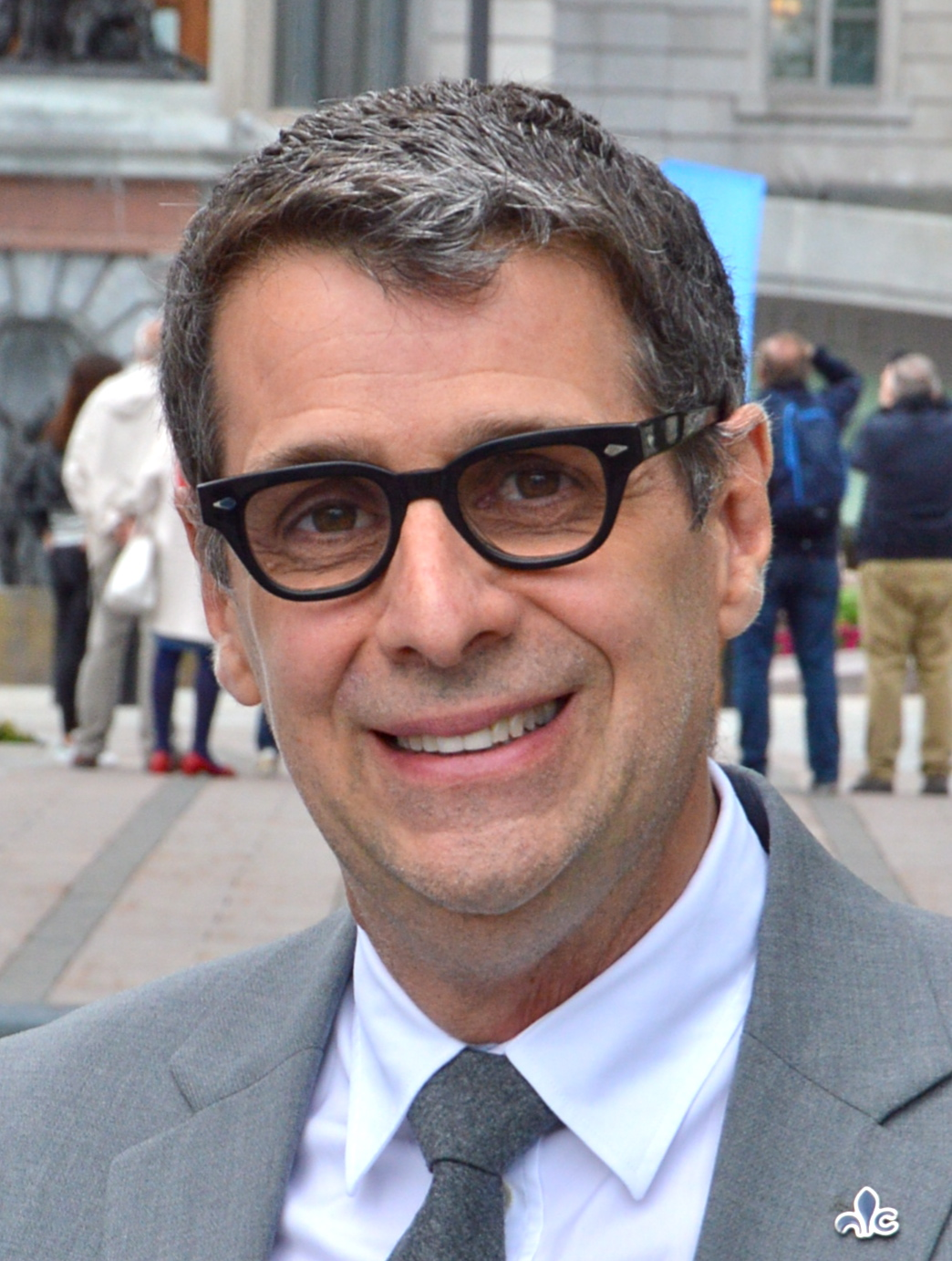
- Duhaime in 2022

Member of the National Assembly for Bellechasse
- Incumbent
- Assumed office October 5, 2026
- Preceded by: Stéphanie Lachance

Leader of the Conservative Party of Quebec
- Incumbent
- Assumed office April 17, 2021
- Preceded by: Adrien D. Pouliot

Personal details
- Born: Éric Joseph Duhaime; April 15, 1969 (age 57) Montreal, Quebec, Canada
- Party: Conservative (provincial); Conservative (federal)
- Other political affiliations: ADQ (2003–2012); CAQ (2012–2020)
- Education: Université de Montréal; École nationale d'administration publique
- Occupation: Columnist, radio host

Éric Joseph Duhaime (French: [eʁik dɥɛm]; born April 15, 1969) is a Canadian politician, columnist, and radio host who has served as leader of the Conservative Party of Quebec since 2021. A member of the National Assembly of Quebec has represented the electoral district of Bellechasse since 2026.

During his radio career, he was associated with radio poubelle, a style of provocative right-wing radio popular in Quebec City.

== Early life and education ==
Éric Joseph Duhaime was born on April 15, 1969, in Montreal. He attained a Bachelor of Arts in political science from the Université de Montréal and a master's degree from École nationale d'administration publique (ÉNAP).

== Media career ==
=== Columnist career ===
He writes for the Journal de Montréal and the National Post and was also a blogger. He participated in various blogs such as Les analystes and also ran a blog on the pages of Journal de Québec (called En droite ligne). In 2019, he wrote a column for Urbania.

Between 2012 and 2014, he published four political essays: L'État contre les jeunes : Comment les baby-boomers ont détourné le système (lit. 'The state against the youth: how baby-boomers hacked the system', 2012), Libérez-nous des syndicats (lit. 'Free us from unions', 2013) and La SAQ pousse le bouchon (lit. 'The SAQ goes too far', 2014).

As of October 2026, Duhaime has written five books. After Quebec outlets reported that Pangram found a majority of his fifth book, Destination Autonomie, about a more autonomous Quebec within Canada, was AI-generated, Duhaime confirmed that he had used AI in its creation.

=== Radio career ===
He hosted Le retour d'Éric Duhaime on FM93 in Quebec City. He also worked as part of public affairs programs broadcast on Noovo, Télé-Québec, Radio X, and 98,5 FM. During this same period, he was radio host of Duhaime le midi at CKLX-FM. From 2015 to 2020, he was the host or co-host of multiple radio shows; notably Normandeau-Duhaime and Duhaime le midi.

His radio commentary at Radio X has been described as radio poubelle otherwise known as trash radio. Duhaime faced criticism from singer Karim Ouellet and hockey player Georges Laraque when he said that some "heroes" in the black community were "zeroes" and that Barack Obama was a bad president. He compared victims of sexual assault to those who don't lock their doors during car thefts of unlocked cars, and said that rape culture does not exist.

== Early political career ==
=== Political activism ===
In 1995, five friends met in Saint-Eustache, Quebec: Duhaime, Martin Masse, who later became a political advisor to Maxime Bernier and co-founded the People's Party of Canada, Montreal Economic Institute (MEI) co-founders Michel Kelly-Gagnon and Pierre Lemieux, as well as Pierre Desrochers, a professor of geography at the University of Toronto Mississauga. These five friends agreed on three priorities to advance the libertarian movement in Quebec: to revive the MEI, where Duhaime later worked, create Les amis de la liberté (Friends of Liberty), an association serving as a meeting place and to present conferences, and to found a magazine which would become Le Québécois Libre. In 2009, Duhaime became a consultant for the National Democratic Institute for International Affairs, leading him to travel to Morocco and Iraq.

Duhaime was an activist for the Parti Québécois and Bloc Québécois in the 1990s, then enrolled in Stockwell Day's team in the early 2000s during the leadership race for the Canadian Alliance party.

In 2010, Duhaime co-founded the Réseau Liberté-Québec along with Joanne Marcotte, Roy Eappen, Gérard Laliberté, Ian Sénéchal and Guillaume Leduc. The RLQ is a movement inspired by the advocating of a revival of conservatism and libertarianism in Quebec. The group held conferences from 2010 to 2013, discussing how to end the Quebec model. Members of the organization played a major role in Duhaime's victory during the 2021 Conservative Party of Quebec leadership election, and the ideas expressed during the conference helped shaped the party platform.

In 2017, he allegedly helped fellow Rebel Media contributor Jack Posobiec translate the leaked emails from the Emmanuel Macron presidential campaign.

=== Political involvement ===
Duhaime spent more than a decade as a political advisor for different leaders in Ottawa and Quebec City. He was an advisor for Stockwell Day during his leadership of the Canadian Alliance from 2001 to 2004, Mario Dumont from 2003 to 2008 who was leader of the Action démocratique du Québec, and Gilles Duceppe of the Bloc Québécois. He was one of the campaign organizers for Marc Bellemare during his mayoralty in Quebec City with Vision Quebec from 2004 to 2006. He made his first run for office in 2003, when he ran for the ADQ in Deux-Montagnes, in which he placed third. Duhamie took out an op-ed in La Presse supporting Bernier for his run for the Conservative leadership in 2017. He particularly praised Bernier's criticism of the supply management system for dairy farmers.

== Leader of the Conservative Party of Quebec ==
On November 22, 2020, Duhaime announced he would be running in the Conservative Party of Quebec leadership election to succeed Adrien D. Pouliot. He won the election with just under 96% of the vote.

Duhaime led the Quebec Conservatives in the 2022 Quebec general election, where he boosted the party's popular vote support from 1.46 percent in 2018 to nearly 13 percent. The party, however, won no seats in the National Assembly; Duhaime lost his bid for a seat in Chauveau by placing second.

In an attempt to win a seat in the National Assembly, Duhaime ran as a candidate in the 2025 Arthabaska provincial by-election. He vowed to "release Quebec from the Carbon Stock Exchange". He finished second behind the Parti Québécois' Alex Boissonneault.

Duhaime led the party in the 2026 Quebec general election, seeking a seat in Bellechasse which he then won. The party won 19 seats and placed third, entering the National Assembly for the first time.

== Personal life ==
Duhaime is openly gay, coming out in his 2017 book La fin de l'homosexualité et le dernier gay.

== Electoral record ==
Quebec provincial by-election, August 11, 2025: Arthabaska Resignation of Eric Lefebvre
Party	Candidate	Votes	%	±%
Parti Québécois	Alex Boissonneault	17,327	46.37	+36.36
Conservative	Éric Duhaime	13,081	35.01	+10.32
Liberal	Chantale Marchand	3,481	9.32	+5.56
Coalition Avenir Québec	Keven Brasseur	2,693	7.21	-44.54
Québec solidaire	Pascale Fortin	548	1.47	-7.76
Climat Québec	Trystan Martel	96	0.26	-0.31
Union Nationale	Eric Simard	55	0.15	–
Équipe Autonomiste	Louis Chandonnet	31	0.08	–
Independent	Denis Gagné	29	0.08	–
Independent	Arpad Nagy	24	0.06	–
Total valid votes		37,365	98.95	
Total rejected ballots		398	1.05	-0.51
Turnout		37,763	59.98	-14.12
Eligible voters		62,960	–	+1.35
Parti Québécois gain from Coalition Avenir Québec		Swing		+40.45

2022 Quebec general election: Chauveau
Party	Candidate	Votes	%	±%
Coalition Avenir Québec	Sylvain Lévesque	20,292	46.84	-0.22
Conservative	Éric Duhaime	13,794	31.84	+23.23
Québec solidaire	Jimena Ruiz Aragon	3,816	8.81	-1.54
Parti Québécois	Charles-Hubert Riverin	3,307	7.63	-1.57
Liberal	Igor Pivovar	1,651	3.81	-18.66
Parti nul	Renaud Blais	213	0.49	–
Climat Québec	Christine Lepage	201	0.46	–
Équipe Autonomiste	Nicolas Bouffard Savoie	44	0.10	–
Total valid votes		43,318	98.59	
Total rejected ballots		619	1.41	
Turnout		43,937	75.68	
Eligible voters		58,059		
Source(s) electionsquebec.qc.ca

Results of the 2021 Conservative Party of Quebec leadership election
Candidate
Candidate	Votes cast	%
Éric Duhaime	9,773	95.99%
Daniel Brisson	408	4.01%
Rejected/Spoiled Ballots	2	0.02%
Total	10,183	100.00

2003 Quebec general election: Deux-Montagnes
Party	Candidate	Votes	%	±%
Parti Québécois	Hélène Robert	12,432	39.04	-7.99
Liberal	Marc Lauzon	12,099	37.99	+7.02
Action démocratique	Éric Duhaime	6,907	21.69	+0.95
UFP	Julien Demers	408	1.28	+0.98 (Note: Results taken from Socialist Democracy.)
Total valid votes		31,846	98.28	–
Total rejected ballots		557	1.72	+0.58
Turnout		32,403	74.37	-2.92
Electors on the lists		43,571	–	–
