= Urbania (media group) =

Montreal-based media company

- Industry: Media, telecommunication
- Founded: 2000
- Founder: Philippe Lamarre, Vianney Tremblay
- Headquarters: Montreal, Quebec, Canada
- Number of locations: 2 offices
- Owner: Philippe Lamarre, Raphaëlle Huysmans
- Divisions: Dehors, Guide des Universités Urbania, Magazineurbania.com, Mollo, Quatre95, Urbania France
- Website: https://urbania.ca/ https://urbania.fr/

Urbania is a Montreal-based media group that was created in 2000. The company operates diverse digital media, a brand agency, a technological laboratory, and an audiovisual production house.

The media group distinguishes itself with its unconventional tone, its close attention to graphic design and visual presentation and its focus on discussing controversial news.

Urbania also operates in France since 2020.

== History ==
Urbania Media originated as a magazine launched in 2003 with a thematic quarterly format. The founders, Philippe Lamarre and Vianney Tremblay, initially worked at the Toxa Design Agency, which had been established in 2000. Initially, the main goal of project was to explore new avenues and have fun. The founders did not imagine it would last for more than a decade.

In 2015, The Toxa Design Agency and Urbania's operations were combined under the same name.

In an interview for the French Canadian Newspaper Le Devoir, Philippe Lamarre explains that Urbania's initial mission to highlight ordinary people doing extraordinary things did not change. Still, its approach to achieving this mission has evolved.

For its 15th anniversary, Urbania referenced a famous Esquire magazine cover featuring Muhammad Ali, by portraying Richard Martineau as a martyr which created controversy. Among Urbania's previous magazine covers are Justin Trudeau and Gérald Tremblay crucified on Mont Royal, Jean Charest shaped in a block of cheddar cheese and Antoine Bertrand and Michèle Richard wearing a bikini.

In September 2020, Urbania Media was established in France under the supervision of Florent Peiffer. Urbania's interest in France was previously shown had already shown an interest for the French market by dedicating an issue to Paris in 2012 as well as during an interview for Le Devoir in 2018.

For Urbania's 20th anniversary in 2023, Cardinal Editions published a book tracing the media group's history.

== Media ==
Urbania first started as a physical magazine but is now mainly a digital magazine.

Each issue of Urbania is dedicated to a particular theme, such as odours, vice, food, scammers, sex, lesbians, and the Quebecois male. The first issue was dedicated to locomotion. The magazine puts lots of attention on graphic design, visual presentation, and layout.

In an interview for Le Devoir, Denis Lord explains that Urbania depicts important and modern urban phenomena while suggesting new ways to view society, and remaining informative, entertaining rebellious and open-minded.

Precisely, he states that "for its 20 years, URBANIA has expanded its audience by developing niche content around themes that resonate with young adults, all while maintaining Urbania's distinct tone."

The magazine publishes numerous articles and videos in gonzo journalism (also called experiential journalism) with a hint of humour and a nonconformist tone. The main goal of this method is for readers to immerse in the information and for Urbania to produce content with emotion and sensitivity.

Urbania has a target audience of young adults ranging from 25 to 44-year-olds in the province.

=== Quatre95 (Quebec) ===
Launched in 2019, Quatre95 is a sub-media of Urbania focused on personal finances, entrepreneurship, the work and business landscape and consumption. It is sponsored by the National Bank of Canada.

The name of this subgroup comes from the original price of the physical Urbania magazine, which was $4.95. In 2022, Quatre95 won the Gold Price of Excellence in digital Publication in the category Of best Editorial newsletter.

=== Dehors (Quebec) ===
Launched in 2021, Dehors discusses the outdoors and sports, nature, tourism and adventures. The goal of Dehors is to offer inclusive content that is free of taboos. According to Barbara Judith Caron, director of digital content, the goal with Dehors is that every reader feels included and connected to the content.

=== Mollo ===
Launched in August 2023 in collaboration with Attitude and Télé-Québec, Mollo targets parents by discussing topics related to parenthood. The main objective of the Mollo subgroup is to support parents in their family and social lives from before the child's birth until the sixth year of primary school. The platform addresses the ups and downs of the world of parenthood without restrictions or taboos.

=== Guide des universités Urbania ===
The Guide des Universités Urbania was launched in January 2020. The platform aims to entertain a young audience ranging from 18 to 25 years old by informing them about the student culture.

=== Urbania (France) ===
In September 2020, Urbania was launched in France under the direction of Florent Peiffer, also joined by members of the original Canadian company. In 2022, approximately 20 journalists were employed to work for the European version of Urbania.

Like its Canadian parent company, the French version of Urbania offers articles and videos on various topics.

In 2021, Urbania France published an investigation into the sexual assault accusations against a popular French YouTuber named Norman Thavaud. These accusations were made by one of Norman's followers who was a minor. Norman Thavaud's press officer denies the accusation but confirms that exchanges between the YouTuber and his fan took place. The case was subsequently covered by Arrêt Sur Images and Libération a year and a half later.

In 2022, Urbania France and YouBlive, a live content agency, partnered to recruit Anaïs Carayon for editorial direction.

== Urbania productions ==
Since 2006, Urbania is collaborating with ARTV for the TV show Mange ta Ville at the request of Catherine Pogonat.

Since 2007, Urbania produces TV shows such as Montréal en 12 lieux and Québec en 12 lieux, both aired on TV5.

Urbania Montréal also produces TV shows for Québecor, Bell Media, TV5, Corus, Radio-Canada, Télé-Québec and ARTE.

In collaboration with the Quebec publishing house La Pastèque, Urbania transforms a children's comic book series called Le facteur de l’espace into an animated children's series and a mini-game.

=== Urbania Studios ===
Urbania Studios is the creative studio within the media group focused on brands. The Montreal-based studio produces brand content. It collaborated with Guru, Toyota and the National Bank of Canada.

In 2023, Urbania launched a talent agency named Valides to represent content creators in partnership with Hainault.

=== Physical magazine ===
Urbania previously distributed physical magazine issues. Listed below are the name of each issues distributed.

Locomotion - Summer 2003 Odeur - Fall 2003 Commerce – Winter 2004 Vice – Spring 2004 Son – Fall 2004 Style – Winter 2005 Gars – Spring 2005 Rétro – Summer 2005 Médias – Fall 2005 Party – Spring 2006 Ethnies – Summer 2006 Folie – Fall 2006 Bouffe – Winter 2007 Vert - Spring2007 Filles – Summer 2007 Montréal – Fall 2007	Célébrité – Fall 2007 Hobby – Spring 2008 Luxe – Summer 2008 Hockey – Fall 2008 Sexe – Winter 2009 Design – Spring 2009 Québec – Summer 2009 Best of – Winter 2010 Médias sociaux – Spring 2010 Âge d'Or – Summer 2010 Escrocs – Fall 2010 Gros – Winter 2011 Humour – Summer 2011 Bébés – Fall 2011 Lesbiennes – Winter 2012 Hiver Québécois – Spring 2012	Parisiens – Summer 2012 À la Ferme – Fall 2012 Anglos – Winter 2013 Special Issue: Imaginer Montréal - L'école URBANIA Roux – Spring 2013 Rue – Summer 2013 Étudiants – Fall 2013 Special Issue : Imaginer Montréal - L'école URBANIA Célibataires – Fall 2014 Anonymat – Yearly 2014 Canada – Yearly 2015 Extraordinaire - 50 Québécois qui créent l'extraordinaire en 2016 - April 2016 Cannabis - Yearly 2016 Extraordinaire - 50 Québécois qui créent l'extraordinaire en 2017 - April 2017 Nos Parents – Yearly September 2017 Nouveau Québécois - 15 ans - Yearly May 2018 Extraordinaire 2018 – Fall 2018 Thème libre – Fall 2019

=== TV productions ===
Since 2015, the media group produces the TV show C’est juste de la TV, hosted by Anne-Marie Withenshaw.

In 2019, Urbania collaborated with the Alchimie group to launch a web television series called Sexplora TV. The TV show was awarded a Gémeaux Award in the category of interactive production – Public Affairs - magazine (2019)

2007	Montréal en 12 lieux - Série documentaire - TV5 Québec
2010	Québec en 12 lieux - 2009-2010 - Série documentaire - TV5 Québec
2013	Fort McMoney - Documentaire - ONF VR en déroute - Série documentaire - Évasion
2014	C'est juste de la TV - saison 10 - 2014 - Magazine culturel - ARTV Le steakhouse - Documentaire - Canal D Les discrètes - Documentaire - Radio-Canada
2015	C'est juste de la TV - saison 11 - 2015 - Magazine culturel - ARTV L'impact, en route vers la MLS - Série documentaire - TVA Sports
2016	Ça fait 20 ans - Documentaire unique - Radio-Canada C'est juste de la TV - saison 12 - 2016 - Magazine culturel - ARTV Conte du centre-sud - Documentaire - Radio-Canada Coureur de smashs - Série documentaire Cris sur le bayou - Documentaire - Canal D Les millionnaires - Fiction - Tou.tv Moto café racers - Série documentaire - Historia
2017	C'est juste de la TV - saison 13 - 2017 - Magazine culturel - ARTV ICI URBANIA - Série documentaire - Radio-Canada
2018	C'est juste de la TV - saison 14 - 2018 - Magazine culturel - ARTV Sexplora I, II et III - 2016-2018 - Série documentaire - Explora Si j'ai bien compris II (Noël) - Balados - Ici première Vendeurs de rêves - Série documentaire - V
2019	À deux pas de la liberté - Série documentaire - UNIS Apprenti autiste - Documentaire unique - Télé-Québec Infiltration IV - Série documentaire - Z Jeunesse arabe, yallah! - Série - TV5 TV5 monde et Tou.tv Mal Élevé - Documentaire unique - Radio-Canada Vérités & conséquences I à III - 2016 à 2019 - Magazine de société - Tou.tv Zone Franche - 2018 à 2019 - Magazine de société - Télé-Québec
2020	Bienvenue à Cité-des-Prairies - Balados - Ici première Bébés - Captation pièce de théâtre - ARTV Couple de nerds (télé+MN) - Série documentaire - Savoir média J'étais là - Série documentaire - Tou.tv / ARTE La belle vie avec Go-Van - Série documentaire - UNIS Kevin - Documentaire unique - Crave / Canal D Sauvetage animal - Série documentaire - TVA Qui a peur des pitbulls? - Documentaire - Radio-Canada Un zoo... l'ennui - Documentaire - Radio-Canada
2021	Aiguille sous roche - Documentaire - Télé-Québec Chef en pandémie - Documentaire - Télé-Québec Couple de nerds - Série documentaire en 2 saisons - Savoir média Emoji-Nation - Série documentaire - Tou.tv / ARTE Havana - Série documentaire - Quebecor (Vrai et Évasion) Kings of coke - Documentaire - Crave / Noovo La belle vie II (télé + MN) - Série documentaire - UNIS La fin des faibles - Variété - Télé-Québec Les sombres secrets du St-Laurent - Série documentaire - Historia Louis T veut savoir - Série documentaire - Savoir média Plat pref - Magazine - Plateforme SRC Mordu Marie-Ève Aubry - Documentaire - Crave / Canal D Viens souper - Magazine - AmiTélé
2022	Allo, voici mon pénis - Documentaire - Crave / Canal vie Amour sans limites - Série documentaire - Crave / Canal vie Cocaïne, prison & likes - Série documentaire - Crave Havana II - Série documentaire - Quebecor (Vrai et Évasion) Évaporés: Victoria Charlton enquête - Série documentaire - Quebecor (Vrai et Addik) Facteur de l'espace - Série d'animation jeunesse - Radio-Canada Jour de gloire - Live unitaire - Arte Revue mordante 2022 - Humour - Plateforme SRC Mordu Une fois c't'un noir - Documentaire - Crave / Noovo / Canal D Louis T veut savoir II - Série documentaire - Savoir média Dans l'ombre du Star wars kid - Série documentaire - Télé-Québec Quelles familles! - Série documentaire - UNIS La fin des faibles II - Variété - Télé-Québec Le début des forts - Capsules documentaires - Télé-Québec Le Québec dans le garde-Manger - Capsules documentaires - Plateforme SRC Mordu Ma ville aux rayons X - Série documentaire - Savoir média Peut contenir des traces de blagues - Balados - Télé-Québec Fragments - Série documentaire - ARTE Un nouveau jour - Série documentaire - Crave / Canal vie Vie de vet - Série documentaire - UNIS Viens souper II - Magazine - AmiTélé
2023	C'est juste de la TV - saison 10 à 16 - 2014-2023 - Magazine culturel - ARTV La belle vie III - Série documentaire - UNIS La vie est un carnaval - Magazine de société - TV5 L'air d'aller - Fiction - Télé-Québec Maman la mitraille - Série documentaire - Quebecor (Vrai et TVA) Pour une fois (émission de télévision) - Talk-show - Télé-Québec

=== Podcasts ===
Since 2019, Urbania produces the podcast Les pires moment de l’histoire, narrated by the comedian Charles Beauchesne and available on Urbania and Ohdio. The comedian discusses various topics including the Crusades, Rasputin, Victorian asylums, and the fall of the Roman Empire.

The podcast was awarded with an Olivier Award in the category of scripted humoristic podcast in 2021 and 2022.

=== Digital productions ===
Previously, each physical magazine had a digital issue. However, now, Urbania suggests a new type of free, digital magazine – the Urbania Micromags – that allows readers to view exclusive content, weekly suggestions and even their horoscope.

The Montreal-based media has partnered with National Film Board (NFB) on various projects throughout the years. In 2012, during an important student protest, Urbania launched a project named “Rouge au Carré.” Urbania partnered with ONF the following year to confront internet users regarding the value charter.

Moreover, they created in 2015 the multimedia website FortMcMoney.com. This project merges the format of movies and video games to create an interactive film about the fictive city of FortMcMoney, inspired by the real-life city of Fort McMurray. The game addresses important topics revolving around capitalism, influence and politics.

== Collaborators ==
Urbania has numerous collaborators working with the company for various projects. These include TV productions, interviews, news coverage and other multi-media projects.

Jimmy Beaulieu Nadine Bismuth Lili Boisvert Rosalie Bonenfant Mélanie Couture Sebastien Diaz Émilie Dubreuil	Éric Duhaime Jay Du Temple Pascal Henrard Marie-Lyne Joncas Barbara Judith-Caron Anick Lemay Kim Lizotte	Judith Lussier André Marois Hugo Meunier Catherine Perrault-Lessard Alain Pilon Steve Proulx Jonathan Roberge

== Awards and honours ==
In May 2006, Philippe Lamarre won the award Relève CGI from the Design Institute of Montreal. As stated in Le Devoir, "Four times between 2003 and 2005, he was awarded Grafika and was awarded twice in the Magazines du Québec competition."

The magazine's website received the Boomerang Award of the Infopress Éditions in 2004. Three years later, the Quebec media group won two Boomerang awards for its website mtl12.com.

In May 2010, Urbania wins two Numix Awards. The same year, it received the Webby Award Official Honoree in the magazine category.

In 2011, the Quebec media group won the Price Issue of the Year of National Magazine Awards for its issue dedicated to social media.

In 2017, Urbania received three Infopresse awards, including one for its issue dedicated to cannabis.

The podcast Les pires moments de l’histoire presented by the comedian Charles Beauchesne was awarded the Olivier of Best Scripted Humoristic Podcast in 2021 and 2022.

In 2022, Quatre95 won the Gold Prix Excellence in Digital Publication in the category of best editorial info letter. The same year, the ADISQ gala awarded the TV show La fin des faibles II in the category TV show of the year – Music. The production named Star Wars Kid about the Ghyslain Raza case received a Gémeaux award in the category: of best editing: public affairs, documentary – TV show.
