= Saint-Norbert-d'Arthabaska =

- Municipality

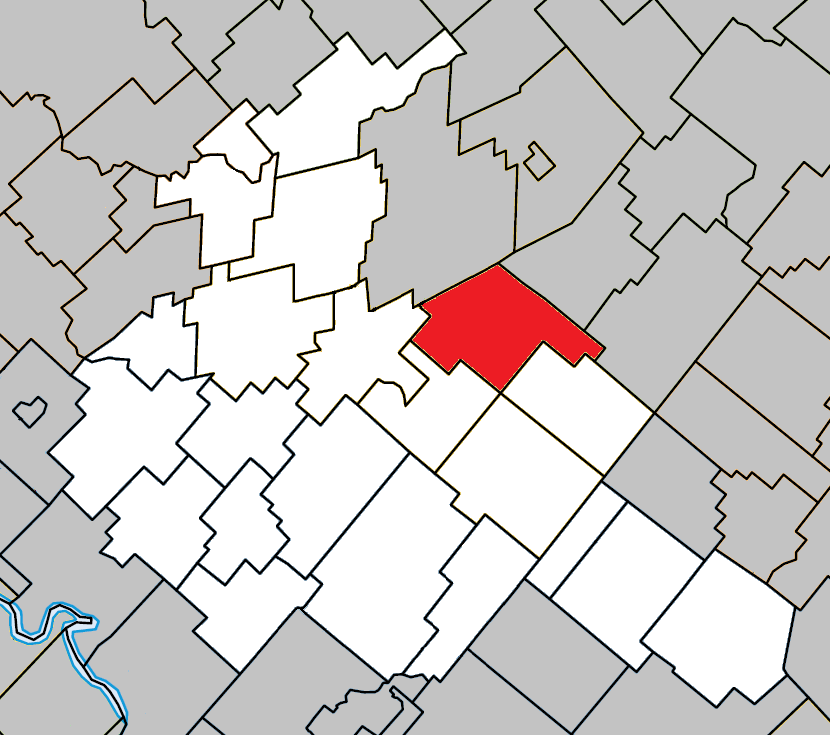
- Location within Arthabaska RCM.

- Location in southern Quebec.
- Coordinates: 46°06′N 71°49′W
- Country: Canada
- Province: Quebec
- Region: Centre-du-Québec
- RCM: Arthabaska
- Constituted: October 21, 2009

Government
  - Mayor: Marc Bussières
  - Federal riding: Richmond—Arthabaska—des-Sources
  - Prov. riding: Arthabaska-L'Érable

Area
  - Total: 102.70 km^{2} (39.65 sq mi)
  - Land: 102.98 km^{2} (39.76 sq mi)
- There is an apparent contradiction between two authoritative sources

Population (2021)
  - Total: 1,247
  - Density: 12.1/km^{2} (31/sq mi)
  - Pop 2016-2021: ▲7.8%
- Time zone: UTC−5 (EST)
  - Summer (DST): UTC−4 (EDT)
- Postal code(s): G0P 1B0
- Area code: 819
- Highways: R-263

Saint-Norbert-d'Arthabaska (French pronunciation: [sɛ̃ nɔʁbɛʁ daʁtabaska]) is a municipality located in the Centre-du-Québec region of Quebec, Canada.
