= Alex Boissonneault =

Canadian politician

- Alex Boissonneault before his swearing-in as MNA for Arthabaska in the National Assembly of Quebec, on August 28, 2025.

Member of the National Assembly of Quebec for Arthabaska
- In office August 11, 2025 – October 5, 2026
- Preceded by: Eric Lefebvre
- Succeeded by: Tarek Henoud

Personal details
- Born: 14 April 1979 (age 47) Saint-Ferdinand, Quebec, Canada
- Party: Parti Québécois
- Profession: Journalist

Alex Boissonneault is a Canadian politician, journalist and radio host from the Parti Québécois who was elected to the National Assembly of Quebec from Arthabaska in a 2025 by-election. He defeated Conservative Party of Quebec leader Éric Duhaime and flipped a Coalition Avenir Québec seat. He was defeated in the 2026 Quebec general election.

He previously hosted Première Heure, a radio show on Ici Radio-Canada Première. During the 3rd Summit of the Americas, Boissonneault was arrested and convicted of plotting to penetrate the secure perimeter, serving in pretrial detention 41 days, but was subsequently sentenced to community service. He regretted his actions and apologized during the 2025 campaign.

== Electoral record ==
Quebec provincial by-election, August 11, 2025: Arthabaska Resignation of Eric Lefebvre
Party	Candidate	Votes	%	±%
Parti Québécois	Alex Boissonneault	17,327	46.37	+36.36
Conservative	Éric Duhaime	13,081	35.01	+10.32
Liberal	Chantale Marchand	3,481	9.32	+5.56
Coalition Avenir Québec	Keven Brasseur	2,693	7.21	-44.54
Québec solidaire	Pascale Fortin	548	1.47	-7.76
Climat Québec	Trystan Martel	96	0.26	-0.31
Union Nationale	Eric Simard	55	0.15	–
Équipe Autonomiste	Louis Chandonnet	31	0.08	–
Independent	Denis Gagné	29	0.08	–
Independent	Arpad Nagy	24	0.06	–
Total valid votes		37,365	98.95	
Total rejected ballots		398	1.05	-0.51
Turnout		37,763	59.98	-14.12
Eligible voters		62,960	–	+1.35
Parti Québécois gain from Coalition Avenir Québec		Swing		+40.45
