= Tarek Henoud =

Canadian politician

Tarek Henoud MNA
- Tarek Henoud in 2022

Member of the National Assembly for Arthabaska-L'Érable
- Incumbent
- Assumed office October 5, 2026
- Preceded by: Alex Boissonneault

Personal details
- Party: Conservative Party

Tarek Henoud MNA is a Canadian politician who served as a member of the National Assembly of Quebec representing the electoral district of Arthabaska–L'Érable since 2026. He is a member of the Conservative Party.

Henoud was the PCQ candidate for the same riding in 2022, finishing in second with 24.69% of the vote (11,187 votes).
