= Claude Bachand (MNA) =

Canadian politician

MNA for Arthabaska
- In office 2008–2012
- Preceded by: Jean-François Roux
- Succeeded by: Sylvie Roy
- In office April 14, 2003 – February 21, 2007
- Preceded by: Jacques Baril
- Succeeded by: Jean-François Roux

Personal details
- Born: April 6, 1956 (age 70) Montreal, Quebec, Canada
- Party: Liberal
- Spouse: Martine Perreault
- Profession: teacher

Claude Bachand (born April 6, 1956) is a Canadian politician in the province of Quebec. Bachand was elected to represent the riding of Arthabaska in the National Assembly of Quebec in the 2008 provincial election. He is a member of the Quebec Liberal Party.

Born in Montreal, Quebec, Bachand obtained a college degree in health sciences at the Cégep de Rosemont in 1976 before obtaining a bachelor's degree at the Université de Sherbrooke in 1979. He worked as a mathematics, physics, and chemistry teacher for 23 years and was also the mayor of the municipality of Saint-Norbert d'Arthabaska in the Centre-du-Québec region of southeastern Quebec from 1992 to 2002. He was also a member of various administrative councils in the Bois-Francs and Centre-du-Quebec area.

In 2003, Bachand was first elected at the National Assembly and was the vice-president of the economy and labor commission until his defeat in the 2007 elections. He briefly taught at a Victoriaville high school until he regained the Arthabaska seat in the 2008 elections.
