= Eric Lefebvre =

Canadian politician (born 1971)

Eric Lefebvre MP
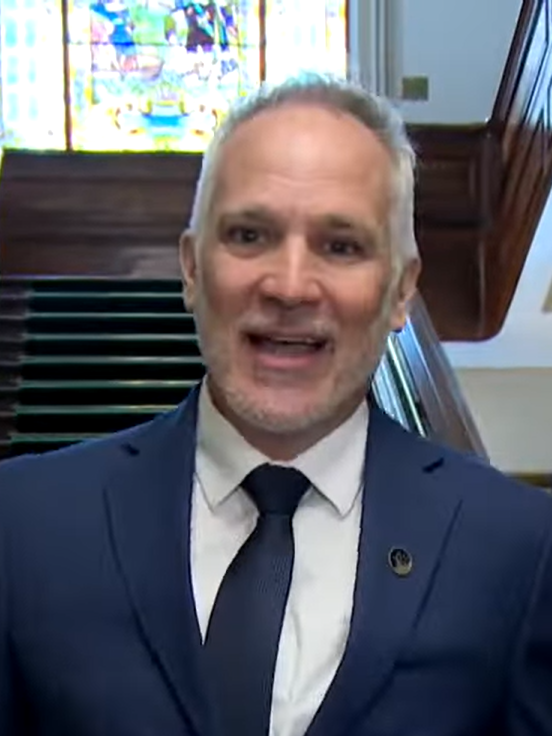
- Lefebvre in 2024

Member of Parliament for Richmond—Arthabaska
- Incumbent
- Assumed office April 28, 2025
- Preceded by: Alain Rayes

Member of the National Assembly of Quebec for Arthabaska
- In office December 5, 2016 – March 18, 2025
- Preceded by: Sylvie Roy
- Succeeded by: Alex Boissonneault

Personal details
- Born: 10 June 1971 (age 55) Victoriaville, Quebec, Canada
- Party: Conservative (federal); Independent (provincial, since 2024)
- Other political affiliations: CAQ (provincial, until 2024)
- Spouse: Geneviève Laliberté
- Children: 2

Eric Lefebvre MP is a Canadian politician who was elected to the National Assembly of Quebec in a by-election on December 5, 2016. He represented the electoral district of Arthabaska as an independent, having been a member of the Coalition Avenir Québec (CAQ) caucus. Lefebvre served as a city councillor for Victoriaville's city council from 2001 to 2009. On Valentine's Day 2018, during question period, Lefebvre gave a tribute to all the spouses that supported MNA members and then proposed to his fiancée.

After being announced as the Conservative candidate for Richmond—Arthabaska in the 45th Canadian federal election, Lefebvre resigned from the CAQ caucus to sit as an independent. The by-election for his provincial seat was held on August 11, 2025.

== Electoral record ==
=== Federal ===
2025 Canadian federal election: Richmond—Arthabaska
Party	Candidate	Votes	%	±%	Expenditures
Conservative	Eric Lefebvre	22,206	35.50	−14.38	$82,341.70
Liberal	Alain Saint-Pierre	20,629	32.98	+18.03	$38,826.84
Bloc Québécois	Daniel Lebel	17,095	27.33	+2.57	$33,337.29
New Democratic	Nataël Bureau	1,248	2.00	−2.46	$392.95
People's	Philippe D'Arcangeli	707	1.13	−2.47	$978.13
Rhinoceros	Réal Batrhino Martel	438	0.70	−0.08	$0.00
Independent	Henri Donascimento	223	0.36	N/A	$0.00
Total valid votes/expense limit		62,546	98.15	+0.08	$136,552.00
Total rejected ballots		1,177	1.85	–0.08	
Turnout		63,723	70.35		
Eligible voters		90,581			
Conservative hold		Swing		−16.21	
Source: Elections Canada
Note: number of eligible voters does not include voting day registrations.

2008 Canadian federal election
Party	Candidate	Votes	%	±%	Expenditures
Bloc Québécois	André Bellavance	23,913	46.0	-2.5	$77,254
Conservative	Eric Lefebvre	15,080	29.0	-3.8	$68,252
Liberal	Gwyneth Helen Grant	6,599	12.7	+2.1	$13,483
New Democratic	Stéphane Ricard	4,509	8.7	+3.7	$6,965
Green	François Fillion	1,337	2.6	-2.1	$129
Independent	Jean Landry	526	1.0		$4,952
Total valid votes/Expense limit		51,964	100.0	$85,600	
Total rejected ballots		728	1.4		
Turnout		52,692	65.6		

=== Provincial ===
2022 Quebec general election: Arthabaska
Party	Candidate	Votes	%	±%
Coalition Avenir Québec	Eric Lefebvre	23,447	51.75	-10.09
Conservative	Tarek Henoud	11,187	24.69	+22.36
Parti Québécois	Mario Beauchesne	4,538	10.02	+0.62
Québec solidaire	Pascale Fortin	4,179	9.22	-3.35
Liberal	Luciana Arantes	1,702	3.76	-7.60
Climat Québec	Trystan Martel	256	0.57	–
Total valid votes		45,309	98.44	–
Total rejected ballots		720	1.56	-0.31
Turnout		46,029	74.10	+4.61
Electors on the lists		62,120	–	–
Coalition Avenir Québec hold		Swing		-16.22

2018 Quebec general election: Arthabaska
Party	Candidate	Votes	%	±%
Coalition Avenir Québec	Eric Lefebvre	25,640	61.84	+17.88
Québec solidaire	William Champigny-Fortier	5,215	12.58	+8.97
Liberal	Pierre Poirier	4,707	11.35	-16.21
Parti Québécois	Jacques Daigle	3,897	9.40	-7.37
Conservative	Lisette Guay Gaudreault	968	2.33	-2.37
Green	Jean-Charles Pelland	620	1.50	-0.61
Alliance provinciale	Jean Landry	418	1.01	–
Total valid votes		41,465	98.13	
Total rejected ballots		791	1.87	+0.85
Turnout		42,256	69.49	+26.35
Eligible voters		60,808		
Coalition Avenir Québec hold		Swing		+4.46
Source(s) "Rapport des résultats officiels du scrutin". Élections Québec.

Quebec provincial by-election, 2016
Party	Candidate	Votes	%	±%
Coalition Avenir Québec	Eric Lefebvre	11,319	43.97	-1.51
Liberal	Luc Dastous	7,095	27.56	-2.65
Parti Québécois	Jacques Daigle	4,312	16.75	-0.32
Conservative	Guy Morin	1,210	4.70	+3.59
Québec solidaire	Sarah Beaudoin	926	3.60	-1.61
Green	Alex Tyrrell	546	2.12	+1.22
Option nationale	Émilie Charbonneau	160	0.62	
Parti indépendantiste	Christine Lavoie	115	0.45	
Équipe Autonomiste	Suzanne Cantin	58	0.23	
Total valid votes		25,741	100.00	
Total rejected ballots		265	1.02	-0.41
Turnout		26,006	43.14	-30.13
Electors on the lists		60,285		
Coalition Avenir Québec hold		Swing		+0.57

=== Municipal ===
Victoriaville - Mayor

Candidate	Vote	%
Alain Rayes	10,807	62.8
Eric Lefebvre	5,722	33.2
Martin Talbot	524	3.0
René Martineau	161	0.9
