= Jean-François Roux =

Canadian politician (born 1973)

Jean-Francois Roux

MNA for Arthabaska
- In office April 25, 2007 – November 5, 2008
- Preceded by: Claude Bachand
- Succeeded by: Claude Bachand

Personal details
- Born: February 19, 1973 (age 53) Victoriaville, Quebec, Canada
- Party: Action démocratique du Québec

Jean-François Roux (born February 19, 1973) is a politician from Quebec, Canada. He was an Action démocratique du Québec Member of the National Assembly for the electoral district of Arthabaska from 2007 to 2008.

Roux was born in Victoriaville, Quebec. He studied psychology and philosophy at Bishop's University but did not complete a degree. He worked as a director for several small businesses in Victoriaville including a director for sales and director for projects.

He was also a football instructor for two secondary school football team as well as a community radio host for Bishop's University's CJMQ-FM. He was also the founder of the pastoral collegiate council at the Cégep de Victoriaville.

He was first elected in the 2007 election with 42% of the vote. Liberal incumbent Claude Bachand, finished second with 30% of the vote. Roux took office on April 12, 2007, and was named the critic for regions until May 2008.
