= Sylvie Roy =

Canadian politician (1964–2016)

MNA for Arthabaska
- In office September 4, 2012 – July 31, 2016
- Preceded by: Claude Bachand
- Succeeded by: Éric Lefebvre

Interim Leader of the Action démocratique du Québec
- In office February 27, 2009 – October 18, 2009
- Preceded by: Mario Dumont
- Succeeded by: Gilles Taillon

MNA for Lotbinière
- In office May 1, 2003 – September 4, 2012
- Preceded by: Jean-Guy Paré
- Succeeded by: riding dissolved

Personal details
- Born: November 4, 1964 La Tuque, Quebec, Canada
- Died: July 31, 2016 (aged 51) Quebec City, Quebec, Canada
- Party: Independent 2015–2016; Coalition Avenir Québec 2012–2015; Action démocratique du Québec 2003–2012
- Spouse: Réal Croteau
- Children: 2

Sylvie Roy (November 4, 1964 – July 31, 2016) was a Canadian politician in Quebec and a Member of the National Assembly for the electoral district of Arthabaska. She previously represented the riding of Lotbinière from 2003 until 2012, initially as a member of the now-defunct Action démocratique du Québec (ADQ) until the merger of that party into the Coalition Avenir Québec (CAQ) in 2012. She left the CAQ to sit as an independent in 2015.

She was awarded a law degree from Université Laval in 1987 and admitted to the Barreau du Québec in 1988. She was lawyer for 15 years including 12 years for mental health organizations in Mauricie. She served as mayor of Saint-Sophie-de-Lévrard from 1998 to 2003. She also worked for the Bécancour Regional County Municipality, Quebec

Roy was first elected to the National Assembly in the 2003 election with 37% of the vote. Parti Québécois (PQ) incumbent Jean-Guy Paré finished third with 26% of the vote.

In the 2007 election, Roy was easily re-elected with 59% of the vote. Liberal candidate Laurent Boissonneault, finished second with 22% of the vote.

On March 29, 2007, Roy was appointed Deputy Official Opposition House Leader.

In the 2008 election, Roy won re-election with 44% of the vote, even though her party's support sharply declined and party leader Mario Dumont announced his resignation. On February 27, 2009, she was named the interim leader of the ADQ until Gilles Taillon became the permanent leader later that year. The ADQ merged with the CAQ in 2012, and Roy was re-elected in the 2012 election.

On August 26, 2015, she resigned to sit as an independent MNA following disagreements with the party leadership.

She died on July 31, 2016, from acute hepatitis.

Party political offices
Preceded by Mario Dumont	Leader of the Action démocratique du Québec (interim); 2009	Succeeded by Gilles Taillon
National Assembly of Quebec
Preceded by Stéphane Bédard (PQ)	Deputy Official Opposition House Leader; 2008–2009	Succeeded by Agnes Maltais (PQ)
