= Joseph-Édouard Perrault =

Canadian politician (1874–1948)

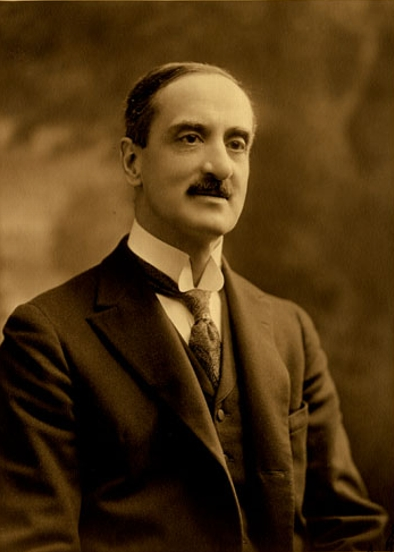

MLA for Arthabaska
- In office 1916–1936
- Preceded by: Paul Tourigny
- Succeeded by: Joseph-David Gagné

Personal details
- Born: July 30, 1874 La Malbaie, Quebec
- Died: June 13, 1948 (aged 73) Montreal, Quebec
- Party: Quebec Liberal Party
- Spouse: Madeleine Richard (m. 1908)

Joseph-Édouard Perrault, KC (French pronunciation: [ʒozɛf edwaʁ pɛʁo]; July 30, 1874 – June 13, 1948) was a lawyer and political figure in Quebec. He represented Arthabaska from 1916 to 1936 in the Legislative Assembly of Quebec as a Liberal member.

== Early life and career ==
He was born in La Malbaie, Quebec, the son of Joseph-Stanislas Perrault and Louisa Brault. Perrault was educated at Sainte-Anne-de-la-Pocatière, at the Séminaire de Québec and the Université Laval. He articled in law with Charles Fitzpatrick, Nazaire-Nicolas Olivier and Louis-Alexandre Taschereau, was called to the Quebec bar in 1898 and set up practice in Arthabaska. He later practised in partnership with his brother Gustave and Wilfrid Girouard. From 1906 to 1916, he was crown prosecutor for Arthabaska district. In 1908, Perrault was named King's Counsel. He was bâtonnier for Arthabaska district from 1909 to 1911 and from 1921 to 1922; he was also bâtonnier for the Quebec bar in 1921 and 1922. Perrault served on the boards of directors for several companies. He was also president of Flax Industries. He served as chair of the school board from 1906 to 1916 and as alderman for the town council for Arthabaska from 1907 to 1916.

Perrault was an unsuccessful candidate for a seat in the House of Commons in 1910 in Drummond—Arthabaska. He was elected to the Quebec assembly as the member for Arthabaska in 1916 and re-elected in 1919. In 1923, he was elected in both Arthabaska and Abitibi, resigning the Abitibi seat later that year to represent Arthabaska. He was subsequently re-elected in 1927, 1931 and 1935.

He served in the Quebec cabinet as Minister of Colonization, Mines and Fisheries from 1919 to 1929, as Minister of Highways from 1929 to 1936, Minister of Colonization from 1935 to 1936 and Solicitor General in 1936.

He retired from politics in 1936 and returned to practice in Montreal.

== Personal life ==
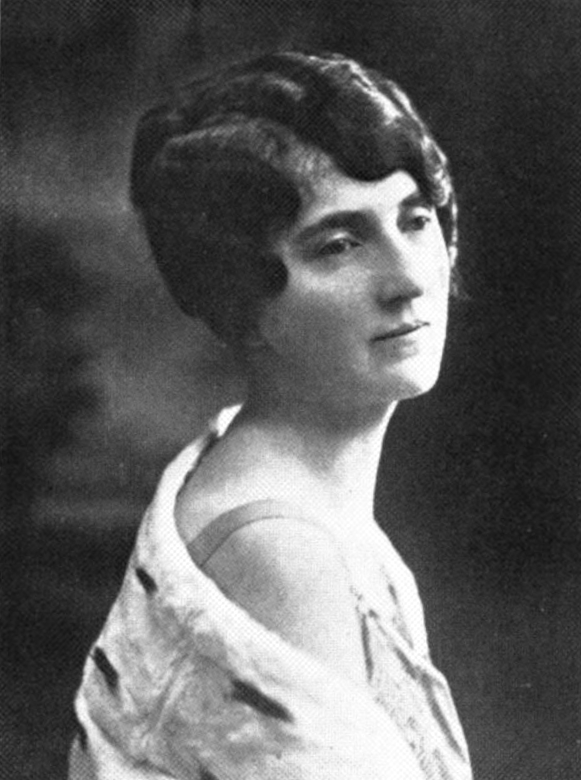
Madeleine Richard

Perrault married Madeleine Richard on June 29, 1908.

He died in Montreal on June 13, 1948.
