= Paul Tourigny =

Canadian politician

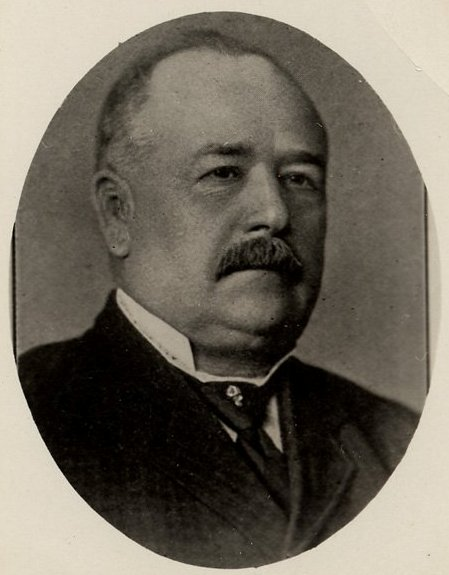

MLA for Arthabaska
- In office 1900–1916
- Preceded by: Joseph-Éna Girouard
- Succeeded by: Joseph-Édouard Perrault

Legislative Councilor for Kennebec division
- In office 1921–1926
- Preceded by: François-Théodore Savoie
- Succeeded by: Joseph-Édouard Caron

Personal details
- Born: November 2, 1852 Saint-Christophe-d'Arthabaska, Canada East
- Died: January 31, 1926 (aged 73) Victoriaville, Quebec
- Party: Quebec Liberal Party

Paul Tourigny (November 2, 1852 – January 31, 1926) was a Canadian politician in the province of Quebec.

Born in Saint-Christophe-d'Arthabaska, Canada East, the son of Landry Tourigny and Lucie Poirier, Tourigny was mayor of Victoriaville from 1892 to 1898 and again from 1900 to 1910. He was acclaimed to the Legislative Assembly of Quebec for the riding of Arthabaska in 1900. A Liberal, He was acclaimed again in 1904, re-elected in 1908 and in 1912. He did not run in the 1916 election. He was appointed to the Legislative Council of Quebec for the Kennebec division in 1921. He served until his death in Victoriaville in 1926.
