= André Bellavance =

Canadian politician (born 1964)

Mayor of Victoriaville
- In office 2016–2021
- Preceded by: Christian Lettre (interim)
- Succeeded by: Antoine Tardif

Leader of the Bloc Québécois in the House of Commons
- In office December 16, 2013 – February 25, 2014
- Preceded by: Louis Plamondon
- Succeeded by: Jean-François Fortin

Member of Parliament for Richmond—Arthabaska
- In office June 28, 2004 – August 4, 2015
- Preceded by: André Bachand
- Succeeded by: Alain Rayes

Personal details
- Born: June 3, 1964 (age 62) Victoriaville, Quebec
- Party: Bloc Québécois (2004–2014), Independent (2014–)
- Education: Université de Laval; Université de Montréal
- Profession: Journalist, political assistant, radio announcer

André Bellavance (born June 3, 1964) is a Canadian politician, who served in the House of Commons of Canada from 2004 to 2015 and was the mayor of Victoriaville, Quebec from 2016 to 2021.

Born in Victoriaville, Quebec, Bellavance was the Bloc Québécois Member of Parliament for Richmond—Arthabaska from 2004 until his resignation from the party on August 25, 2014, continuing in the House of Commons of Canada as an Independent until the 2015 election. representing the riding of Richmond—Arthabaska since 2004. Before being elected, he was the parliamentary assistant to Pierre Paquette.

Bellavance was interim parliamentary leader of the Bloc from December 16, 2013, to February 25, 2014. On February 25, 2014, Bellavance resigned from that position to become a candidate in the Bloc Québécois leadership election. Bellavance's candidacy for leadership was endorsed by the other three BQ MPs, however he was defeated in the leadership election by Mario Beaulieu, the former president of the sovereigntist Société-Saint-Jean-Baptiste, who was viewed as a "hardline" (pur et dur) sovereigntist in comparison to Bellavance who had campaigned on broadening the party so that it would become more than a coalition of sovereigntists.

On his reasons for leaving the Bloc, Bellavance told a press conference: "[Beaulieu's] vision and orientation for the Bloc are diametrically opposed to mine. Mr. Beaulieu says he can unite the party; for me it's not the case." Bellavance also announced that he will not seek re-election as an MP.

Bellavance was elected as mayor of Victoriaville on February 21, 2016, following the election of previous mayor Alain Rayes to the House of Commons.

== Flag flap ==
Bellavance gained national attention early in his first term as an MP, when he initially refused to provide Canadian flags to a Royal Canadian Legion hall in Richmond. Bellavance, a Quebec sovereigntist, had said he felt uncomfortable promoting Canada by providing a flag through his own office, and instead provided a toll-free phone number for the Department of Canadian Heritage, which might provide such a flag.

Other Bloc MPs had given their constituents Canadian flags on request in the past. A short national scandal ensued at what critics perceived a slight against veterans and against the country. Many politicians quickly sent the Legion flags; Prime Minister Paul Martin sent a flag that had flown atop the Peace Tower, and Opposition leader Stephen Harper personally delivered a dozen flags.

Gilles Duceppe, then leader of the Bloc Québécois, announced that the Bloc whip would send the legion several flags.
