= Saint-Christophe-d'Arthabaska =

- Parish municipality
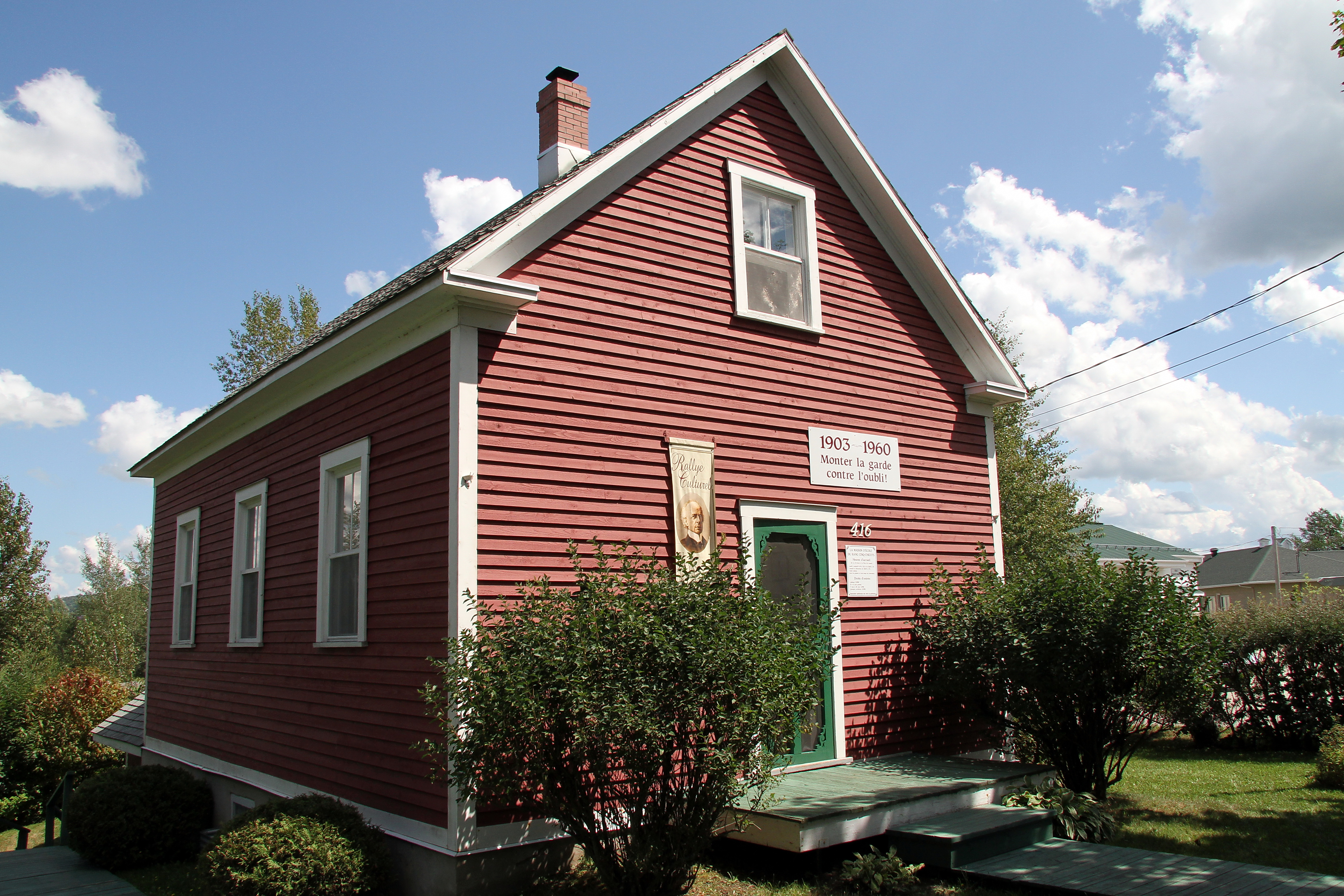

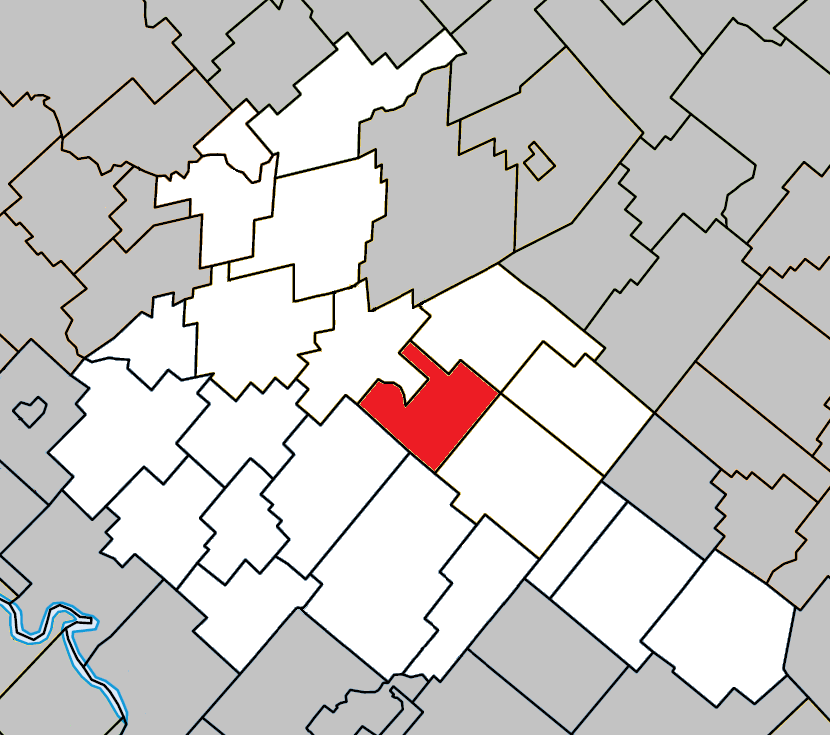
- Location within Arthabaska RCM.

- Location in southern Quebec.
- Coordinates: 46°02′N 71°53′W
- Country: Canada
- Province: Quebec
- Region: Centre-du-Québec
- RCM: Arthabaska
- Constituted: July 1, 1855

Government
  - Mayor: Marc-Olivier Racette
  - Federal riding: Richmond—Arthabaska—des-Sources
  - Prov. riding: Arthabaska–L'Érable

Area
  - Total: 69.20 km^{2} (26.72 sq mi)
  - Land: 69 km^{2} (27 sq mi)

Population (2016)
  - Total: 3,021
  - Density: 43.8/km^{2} (113/sq mi)
  - Pop 2011-2016: ▲4.5%
- Time zone: UTC−5 (EST)
  - Summer (DST): UTC−4 (EDT)
- Postal code(s): G6R 0M9
- Area code: 819
- Highways: R-116; R-161
- Website: www.saint-christophe -darthabaska.ca

Saint-Christophe-d'Arthabaska (French pronunciation: [sɛ̃ kʁistɔf daʁtabaska]) is a parish municipality located in the Centre-du-Québec region of Quebec, Canada.

== Demographics ==
In the 2021 Census of Population conducted by Statistics Canada, Saint-Christophe-d'Arthabaska had a population of 3,111 living in 1,178 of its 1,222 total private dwellings, a change of 3% from its 2016 population of 3,021. With a land area of 68.96 km^{2} (26.63 sq mi), it had a population density of 45.1/km^{2} (116.8/sq mi) in 2021.
