= 2021 Conservative Party of Quebec leadership election =

Conservative Party of Quebec leadership election

- April 17, 2021
- Turnout: 78.3%
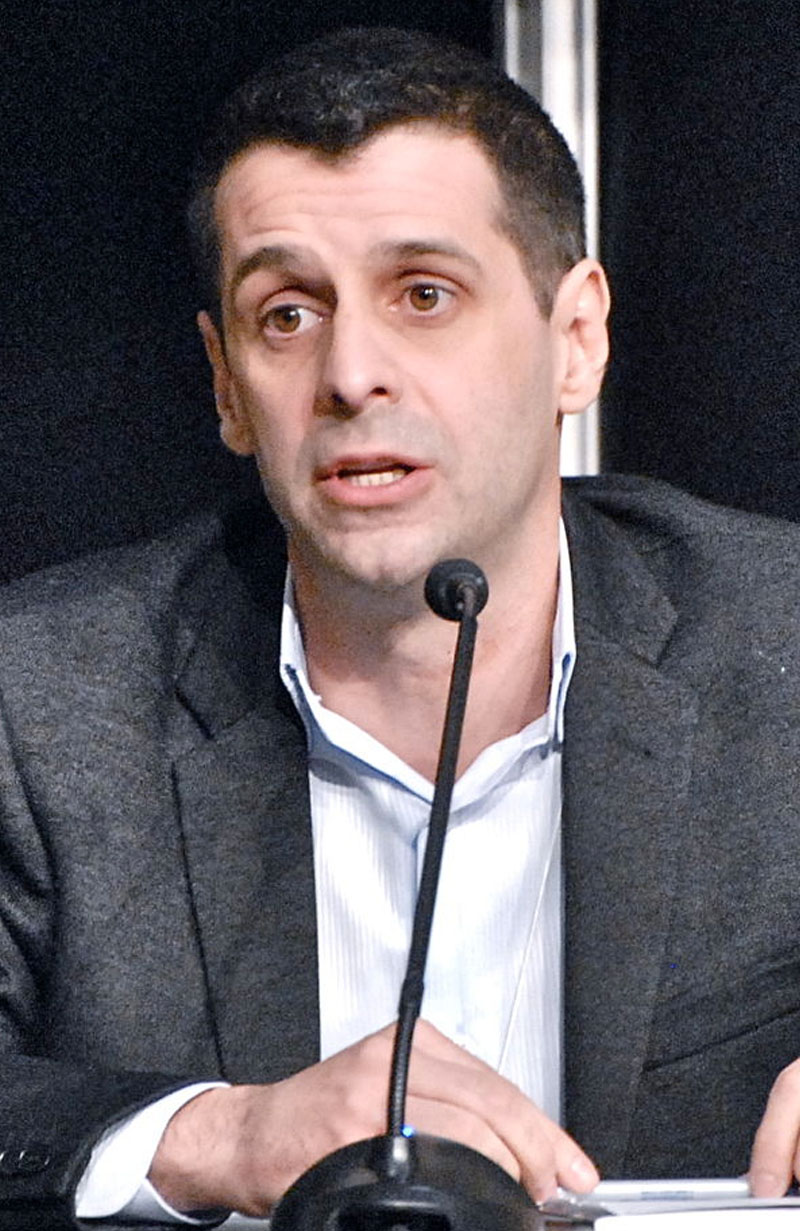
Candidate	Éric Duhaime	Daniel Brisson
Riding	N/A (Note: Ran in Deux-Montagnes for the ADQ in 2003.)	N/A (Note: Ran in Vanier-Les Rivières in 2012.)
Results	9,773	408
Leader before election
Adrien D. Pouliot
Elected Leader
Éric Duhaime

2021 Conservative Party of Quebec leadership election
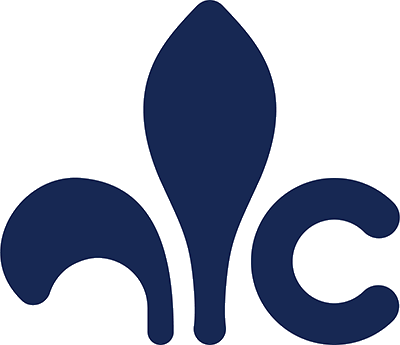
- Date: April 17, 2021
- Convention: Hotel Château Laurier, Québec City, Québec
- Resigning leader: Adrien D. Pouliot
- Won by: Éric Duhaime
- Ballots: 10,183
- Candidates: 2
- Entrance fee: $5,000
- Spending limit: $60,000

The 2021 Conservative Party of Quebec leadership election took place on April 17, 2021 to elect a leader to replace Adrien D. Pouliot, who tendered his resignation on October 16, 2020 to focus on his business ventures. The election was won by radio host and columnist Éric Duhaime.

== Background ==
Adrien Pouliot announced on Facebook that he would be resigning as party leader on October 16, 2020, to pursue further business ventures. Pouliot remained party leader until the new leader was chosen.

== Timeline ==
=== 2020 ===
- October 16 – Adrien Pouliot announces his pending resignation as Leader of the Conservative Party of Quebec.
- October 20 – The Leadership Contest Organization Committee (LEOC) is announced.
- October 27 – The official rules of the election are released.
- November 11 – Daniel Brisson declares his candidacy.
- November 22 – Éric Duhaime declares his candidacy.
- December 16 – First deadline to raise $1,500 as part of the entry fee.
- December 17 – Last day to register as a candidate.

=== 2021 ===
- February 17 – Second and final deadline to raise $5,000 as part of the entry fee.
- March 2 – The first debate between Éric Duhaime and Daniel Brisson is held.
- March 15 – Last day to become an eligible party member.
- March 16 – Voting opens electronically and by mail.
- March 31 – The second debate between Éric Duhaime and Daniel Brisson is held.
- April 17 –
  - Voting closes.
  - The results are announced.

== Debates ==
Debates among candidates for the 2021 Conservative Party of Quebec leadership election
No.	Date	Place	Host	Moderator	Language	Participants	
P Participant N Non-invitee A Absent invitee O Out of race (exploring or withdrawn)						Duhaime	Brisson
1	March 2, 2021	Online	CMATV	Michel Montminy	French	P	P
2	March 31, 2021	Radio (Lévis)	CJMD-FM	Guillaume Ratté-Côté	French	P	P

== Candidates ==
=== Daniel Brisson ===
Daniel Brisson is an IT specialist who was a contender in the 2013 leadership election. Brisson ran in Vanier-Les Rivières in 2012, was the Alliance citoyenne candidate for mayor in Quebec City in 2017, and was the People's Party of Canada candidate in Louis-Hébert in 2019.

Candidacy announced: November 11, 2020
Date registered with Élections Québec:

Endorsements of Daniel Brisson (2)

MNAs:
Federal politicians:
Municipal politicians:
Former MNAs: (2)

- Claude Roy (Former ADQ MNA for Montmagny-L'Islet, 2007-2008)
- Albert De Martin (Former interim leader of the Conservative Party of Quebec, 2012-2013; former ADQ MNA for Huntingdon, 2007-2008; 2014 candidate in Huntingdon; 2015 Conservative candidate in Salaberry—Suroît)

Former federal politicians:
Former municipal politicians:
Other prominent individuals:
Organizations:
Media:
Total endorsements: 2

=== Éric Duhaime ===
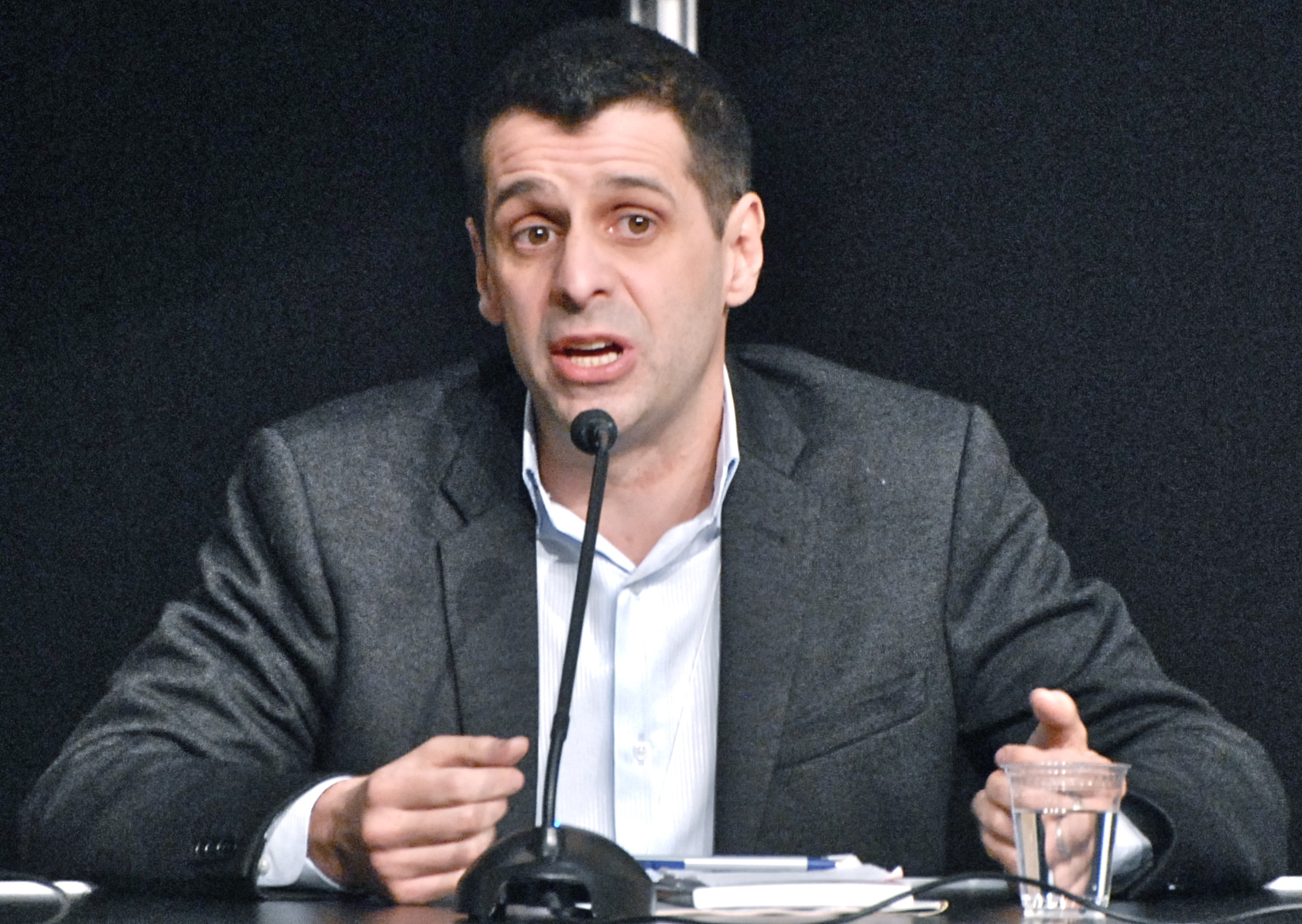
Éric Duhaime

Éric Duhaime, 51, is a political pundit, journalist and former political advisor. Prior to entering politics, Duhaime worked as a radio host on 98,5 FM, and was an advisor to politicians such as Stockwell Day, the then-leader of the Canadian Alliance, Mario Dumont, the then-leader of the Action démocratique du Québec, and Gilles Duceppe, the then-leader of the Bloc Québécois.

Candidacy announced: November 22, 2020
Date registered with Élections Québec:
Campaign website: ericduhaime.quebec

Endorsements of Éric Duhaime (8)

MNAs:
Federal politicians: (3)

- Pierre-Hugues Boisvenu (Conservative Senator for La Salle)
- Leo Housakos (Former Speaker of the Senate, April 2015–December 2015; Conservative Senator for Wellington, Quebec)
- Josée Verner (Interim Deputy Leader of the Canadian Senators Group; Senator for Montarville, Quebec; former federal cabinet minister and former Conservative MP for Louis-Saint-Laurent, 2006-2011)

Municipal politicians:
Former MNAs:
Former federal politicians: (1)

- Stockwell Day (Former Leader of the Official Opposition, 2000-2001; former leader of the Canadian Alliance, 2000-2001; former federal cabinet minister; former MP for Okanagan—Coquihalla, 2000-2011; former Alberta PC MLA for Red Deer-North, 1986-2000)

Former municipal politicians: (1)

- Yves Lévesque (Former mayor of Trois-Rivières; 2019 Conservative candidate in Trois-Rivières)

Other prominent individuals: (2)

- Samuel Grenier (Vice-President and Spokesperson for Entrepreneurs en Action du Québec)
- André Valiquette (Former journalist & member of the Conservative Party of Quebec National Executive; 2019 People's Party candidate in Notre-Dame-de-Grâce—Westmount)

Organizations:
Media: (1)

- Jeff Fillion (Radio host & businessman)

Total endorsements: 8

== Declined to run ==
- Frank Dumas, businessman
- Maxime Bernier, leader of the People's Party of Canada; former federal Conservative cabinet minister; former MP for Beauce
- Nicolas Gagnon, spokesperson for Québec Fier
- Yaakov Pollak, 2018 candidate in Mont-Royal–Outremont

== Results ==
Results
Candidate
Candidate	Votes cast	%
Éric Duhaime	9,773	95.99%
Daniel Brisson	408	4.01%
Rejected/Spoiled Ballots	2	0.0002%
Total	10,183	100.00
