= Princeville, Quebec =

Princeville
- City
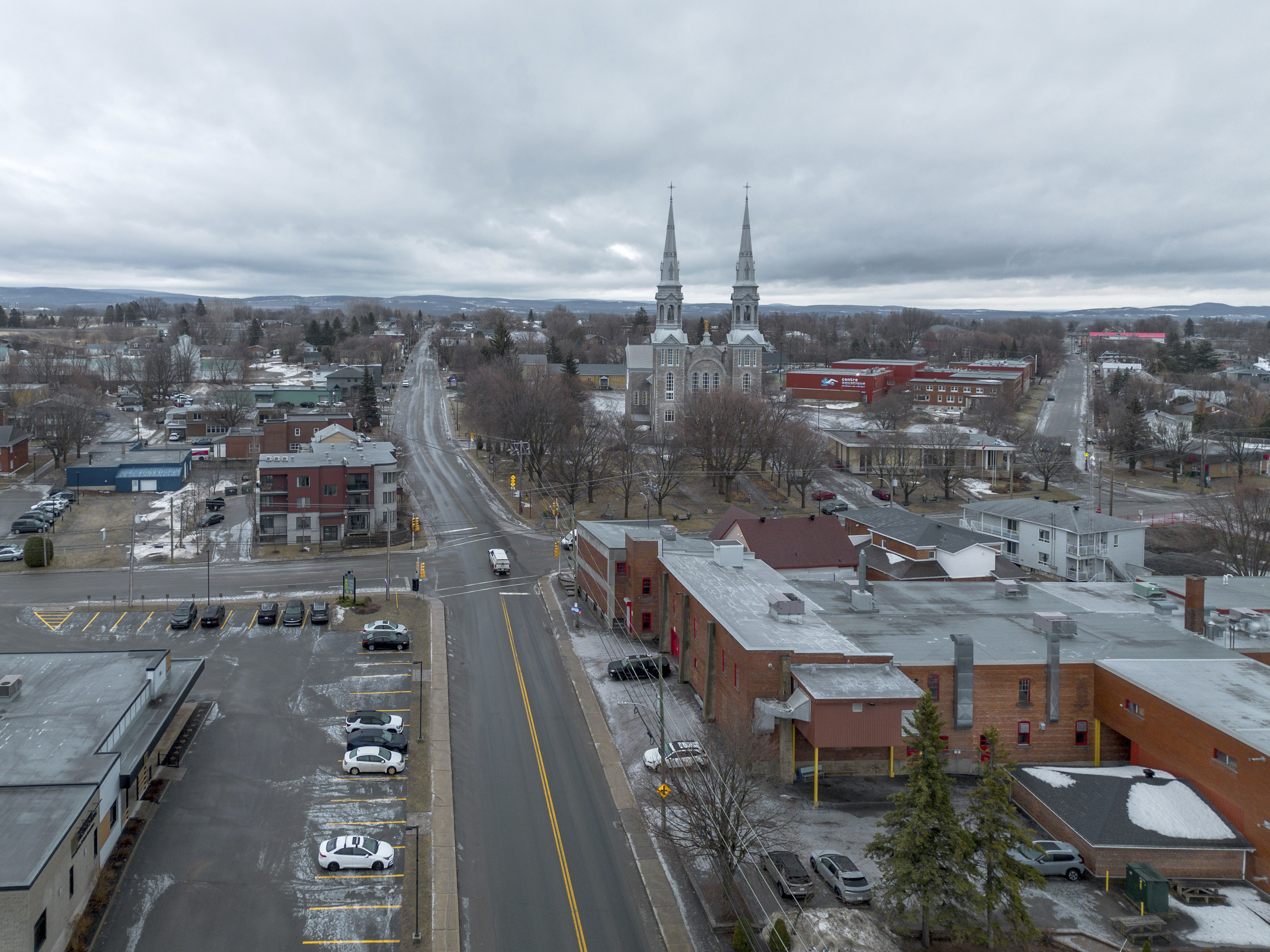
- Princeville in 2026

- Seal Coat of arms
- Motto: Droit et Loyal (French for "Right and Loyal")
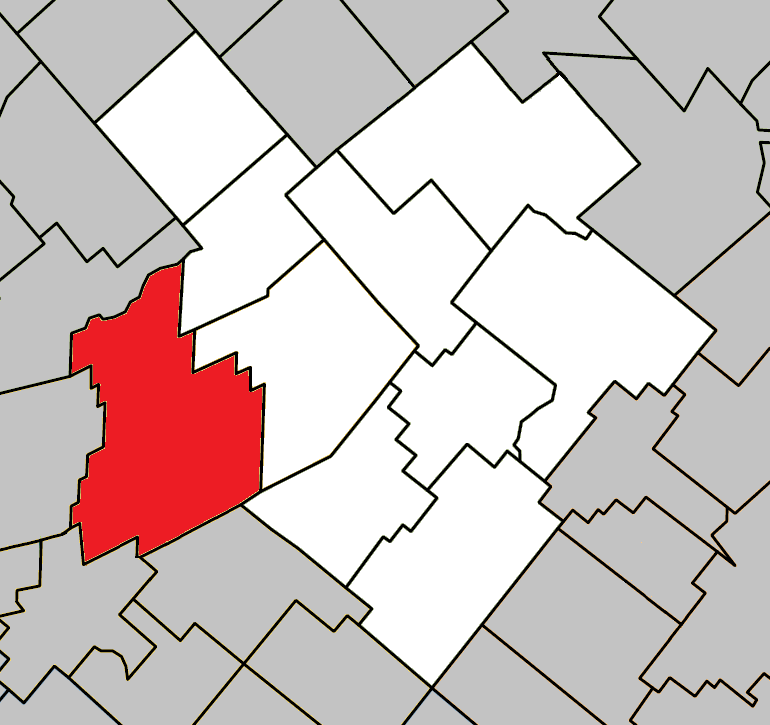
- Location within L'Érable RCM.

- Location in southern Quebec.
- Coordinates: 46°10′N 71°53′W
- Country: Canada
- Province: Quebec
- Region: Centre-du-Québec
- RCM: L'Érable
- Constituted: February 23, 2000

Government
  - Mayor: Raphaël Guérard
  - Federal riding: Mégantic—L'Érable—Lotbinière
  - Prov. riding: Arthabaska–L'Érable

Area
  - City: 196.70 km^{2} (75.95 sq mi)
  - Land: 195.01 km^{2} (75.29 sq mi)
  - Urban: 3.97 km^{2} (1.53 sq mi)

Population (2021)
  - City: 6,218
  - Density: 31.9/km^{2} (83/sq mi)
  - Urban: 4,396
  - Urban density: 1,106.9/km^{2} (2,867/sq mi)
  - Pop 2016-2021: ▲3.6%
  - Dwellings: 2,903
- Time zone: UTC−5 (EST)
  - Summer (DST): UTC−4 (EDT)
- Postal code(s): G6L 4Y5
- Area code: 819
- Highways: R-116; R-165; R-263
- Website: www.villedeprinceville.qc.ca

Princeville (French pronunciation: [pʁinsvil]) is a city in the Canadian province of Quebec, located in L'Érable Regional County Municipality in the Centre-du-Québec region.

The population was 6,218 as of the Canada 2021 Census.

== History ==
The county of Stanfold (Princeville) was created by Édouard Leclerc on July 9, 1807 when he established himself on lot 6, rang 12 in Princeville. A monument was erected in his honour on the east section of the 12th rang. Stanfold then had a new division that would become the village of Princeville in 1856. Thus two municipalities would now co-existed.

On February 23, 2000, the municipalities of the city of Princeville and the parish of Princeville become one to form the new city of Princeville.

== Geography ==
Covering an area of 195.01 km2, Princeville is crossed by the Bulstrode River, 81 km south of Trois-Rivières, 145 km from the border of the US state of Maine and 70 km from Drummondville.

== Demographics ==
In the 2021 Census of Population conducted by Statistics Canada, Princeville had a population of 6,218 living in 2,781 of its 2,903 total private dwellings, a change of 3.6% from its 2016 population of 6,001. With a land area of 195.01 km^{2} (75.29 sq mi), it had a population density of 31.9/km^{2} (82.6/sq mi) in 2021.

Canada census – Princeville, Quebec community profile

	2021	2016	2011
Population	6,218 (+3.6% from 2016)	6,001 (+5.4% from 2011)	5,693 (+2.2% from 2006)
Land area	195.01 km^{2} (75.29 sq mi)	195.26 km^{2} (75.39 sq mi)	194.02 km^{2} (74.91 sq mi)
Population density	31.9/km^{2} (83/sq mi)	30.7/km^{2} (80/sq mi)	29.3/km^{2} (76/sq mi)
Median age	41.2 (M: 40.8, F: 42)	40.9 (M: 39.6, F: 42.3)	41.2 (M: 40.6, F: 41.8)
Private dwellings	2,903 (total)	2,702 (total)	2,497 (total)
Median household income	$62,000	$50,944	$44,611

References: 2021 2016 2011
