= Richmond—Arthabaska—des-Sources =

Federal electoral district in Quebec, Canada

Quebec electoral district
- Interactive map of riding boundaries from the 2015 federal election

Federal electoral district
- Legislature: House of Commons
MP
Eric Lefebvre
Conservative
- District created: 1996
- First contested: 1997
- Last contested: 2025
- District webpage: profile, map

Demographics
- Population (2011): 103,897
- Electors (2015): 85,118
- Area (km²): 3,571
- Pop. density (per km²): 29.1
- Census division(s): Arthabaska, Les Sources, Le Val-Saint-François
- Census subdivision(s): Victoriaville, Val-des-Sources, Windsor, Warwick, Saint-Denis-de-Brompton Danville, Richmond, Saint-Christophe-d'Arthabaska, Saint-François-Xavier-de-Brompton, Daveluyville

Richmond—Arthabaska—des-Sources (previously Richmond—Arthabaska) is a federal electoral district in Quebec, Canada, that has been represented in the House of Commons of Canada since 1997.

== Geography ==
The riding, north of the city of Sherbrooke, straddles the Quebec regions of Centre-du-Québec and Estrie. It consists of the Regional County Municipalities (RCM) of Les Sources and Arthabaska and the centre of the RCM of Le Val-Saint-François. It includes in particular the towns of Victoriaville and Val-des-Sources.

The neighbouring ridings are Drummond, Bécancour—Nicolet—Saurel—Alnôbak, Mégantic—L'Érable—Lotbinière, Compton—Stanstead, Brome—Missisquoi, and Shefford.

Its population is 100,116, including 82,663 voters, and its area is 3,563 km^{2}.

== History ==
The riding was created in 1996 from portions of Drummond, Richmond—Wolfe, Compton—Stanstead and Lotbinière—L'Érable ridings.

There were no territory changes to this riding from the 2012 electoral redistribution.

In 2026, the riding's name was changed to Richmond—Arthabaska—Val-des-Sources as part of Bill C-25 of the 45th Canadian Parliament.

=== Members of Parliament ===
This riding has elected the following members of Parliament:

Parliament	Years	Member	Party
Richmond—Arthabaska; Riding created from Drummond, Richmond—Wolfe, Compton—Stanstead and Lotbinière—L'Érable
36th	1997–2000	André Bachand	Progressive Conservative
37th	2000–2003	André Bachand	Progressive Conservative
37th	2003–2004	André Bachand	Independent
38th	2004–2006	André Bellavance	Bloc Québécois
39th	2006–2008	André Bellavance	Bloc Québécois
40th	2008–2011	André Bellavance	Bloc Québécois
41st	2011–2014	André Bellavance	Bloc Québécois
41st	2014–2015	André Bellavance	Independent
42nd	2015–2019	Alain Rayes	Conservative
43rd	2019–2021	Alain Rayes	Conservative
44th	2021–2022	Alain Rayes	Conservative
44th	2022–2025	Alain Rayes	Independent
45th	2025–present	Eric Lefebvre	Conservative

== Election results ==
Election results in Richmond—Arthabaska 1996-present (minor parties that never got 2% of the vote or didn't run consistently are omitted)

2025 Canadian federal election: Richmond—Arthabaska
Party	Candidate	Votes	%	±%	Expenditures
Conservative	Eric Lefebvre	22,206	35.50	−14.38	$82,341.70
Liberal	Alain Saint-Pierre	20,629	32.98	+18.03	$38,826.84
Bloc Québécois	Daniel Lebel	17,095	27.33	+2.57	$33,337.29
New Democratic	Nataël Bureau	1,248	2.00	−2.46	$392.95
People's	Philippe D'Arcangeli	707	1.13	−2.47	$978.13
Rhinoceros	Réal Batrhino Martel	438	0.70	−0.08	$0.00
Independent	Henri Donascimento	223	0.36	N/A	$0.00
Total valid votes/expense limit		62,546	98.15	+0.08	$136,552.00
Total rejected ballots		1,177	1.85	–0.08	
Turnout		63,723	70.35		
Eligible voters		90,581			
Conservative hold		Swing		−16.21	
Source: Elections Canada
Note: number of eligible voters does not include voting day registrations.

2021 Canadian federal election
Party	Candidate	Votes	%	±%	Expenditures
Conservative	Alain Rayes	28,513	49.9	+4.6	$77,802.72
Bloc Québécois	Diego Scalzo	14,150	24.8	-3.4	$21,445.03
Liberal	Alexandre Desmarais	8,543	14.9	-0.2	$9,158.14
New Democratic	Nataël Bureau	2,550	4.5	-0.4	$0.00
People's	Nadine Fougeron	2,058	3.6	+2.4	$0.00
Free	Louis Richard	897	1.6	N/A	$261.59
Rhinoceros	Marjolaine Delisle	448	0.8	N/A	$0.00
Total valid votes/expense limit		57,159	98.1	–	$116,926.70
Total rejected ballots		1,125	1.9		
Turnout		58,284	66.3		
Eligible voters		87,942			
Conservative hold		Swing		+4.0	
Source: Elections Canada

2019 Canadian federal election: Richmond—Arthabaska
Party	Candidate	Votes	%	±%	Expenditures
Conservative	Alain Rayes	26,553	45.3	+13.70	$62,920.65
Bloc Québécois	Olivier Nolin	16,539	28.2	+11.00	none listed
Liberal	Marc Patry	8,868	15.1	-9.60	$14,690.80
Green	Laura Horth-Lepage	3,133	5.3	+3.60	none listed
New Democratic	Olivier Guérin	2,864	4.9	-19.30	$0.33
People's	Jean Landry	681	1.2	-	$462.33
Total valid votes/expense limit		58,638	100.0		
Total rejected ballots		1,077			
Turnout		59,715	68.8		
Eligible voters		86,741			
Conservative hold		Swing		+1.35	
Source: Elections Canada

2015 Canadian federal election
Party	Candidate	Votes	%	±%	Expenditures
Conservative	Alain Rayes	18,505	31.57	+6.87	$136,964.22
Liberal	Marc Desmarais	14,463	24.67	+17.71	$33,114.26
New Democratic	Myriam Beaulieu	14,213	24.25	-8.24	$58,782.84
Bloc Québécois	Olivier Nolin	10,068	17.18	-16.65	$50,004.53
Green	Laurier Busque	984	1.68	-0.38	$79.93
Rhinoceros	Antoine Dubois	384	0.66	–	–
Total valid votes/expense limit		58,617	100.0		$224,297.28
Total rejected ballots		912	–	–	
Turnout		59,529	–	–	
Eligible voters		85,652			
Conservative gain from Bloc Québécois		Swing		-5.40	
Source: Elections Canada

2011 Canadian federal election
Party	Candidate	Votes	%	±%	Expenditures
Bloc Québécois	André Bellavance	18,033	33.83	-12.2	
New Democratic	Isabelle Maguire	17,316	32.49	+23.8	
Conservative	Jean-Philippe Bachand	13,145	24.66	-4.3	
Liberal	Marie-Josée Talbot	3,711	6.96	-5.7	
Green	Tomy Bombardier	1,098	2.06	-0.5	
Total valid votes/expense limit		53,303	100.0		
Total rejected ballots		871	1.6	-0.2	
Turnout		54,174	69.2	+3.6	
Eligible voters		82,663	–	–	

2008 Canadian federal election
Party	Candidate	Votes	%	±%	Expenditures
Bloc Québécois	André Bellavance	23,913	46.0	-2.5	$77,254
Conservative	Éric Lefebvre	15,080	29.0	-3.8	$68,252
Liberal	Gwyneth Helen Grant	6,599	12.7	+2.1	$13,483
New Democratic	Stéphane Ricard	4,509	8.7	+3.7	$6,965
Green	François Fillion	1,337	2.6	-2.1	$129
Independent	Jean Landry	526	1.0		$4,952
Total valid votes/expense limit		51,964	100.0	$85,600	
Total rejected ballots		728	1.4		
Turnout		52,692	65.6		

2006 Canadian federal election
Party	Candidate	Votes	%	±%	Expenditures
Bloc Québécois	André Bellavance	24,466	47.9	-7.7	$45,923
Conservative	Jean Landry	16,465	32.2	+21.8	$54,937
Liberal	Louis Napoléon Mercier	5,294	10.4	-16.8	$13,189
New Democratic	Isabelle Maguire	2,507	4.9	+1.6	$1,096
Green	Laurier Busque	2,355	4.6	+1.0	$320
Total valid votes/expense limit		51,087	100.0	$79,322	

2004 Canadian federal election
Party	Candidate	Votes	%	±%	Expenditures
Bloc Québécois	André Bellavance	26,211	55.6	+19.2	$57,094
Liberal	Christine St-Pierre	12,809	27.2	+5.7	$57,787
Conservative	Pierre Poissant	4,925	10.4	-30.3	$23,328
Green	Lucie LaForest	1,699	3.6	+3.6	$164
New Democratic	Jason S. Noble	1,540	3.3	+2.8	$7,832
Total valid votes/expense limit		47,184	100.0	$77,446	
Majority		13,402	28.4		
Rejected ballots		1,112	2.3		
Turnout		48,296	62.2		
Bloc Québécois gain from Progressive Conservative		Swing		+6.8	

Change from 2000 is based on redistributed results. Conservative Party change is based on the total of Canadian Alliance and Progressive Conservative Party votes.

2000 Canadian federal election
Party	Candidate	Votes	%	±%
Progressive Conservative	André Bachand	18,430	37.2	-4.3
Bloc Québécois	André Bellavance	18,067	36.5	-0.5
Liberal	Aldéi Beaudoin	10,416	21.0	+0.7
Alliance	Philippe Ardilliez	1,930	3.9	
Natural Law	Christian Simard	375	0.8	
New Democratic	Vincent Bernier	319	0.6	-0.6
Total valid votes		49,537	100.0	

1997 Canadian federal election
Party	Candidate	Votes	%
Progressive Conservative	André Bachand	21,687	41.5
Bloc Québécois	Gaston Leroux	19,319	37.0
Liberal	Aldéi Beaudoin	10,613	20.3
New Democratic	Martin Bergeron	641	1.2
Total valid votes		52,260	100.0

== See also ==
- List of Canadian electoral districts
- Historical federal electoral districts of Canada
