= Michel Clair =

Canadian politician (born 1950)

Michel Clair (born June 16, 1950) is an administrator and former politician in the Canadian province of Quebec. He was a Parti Québécois member of the National Assembly of Quebec from 1976 to 1985 and served as a cabinet minister in the governments of René Lévesque and Pierre-Marc Johnson. Clair later became an executive administrator with Hydro-Québec.

== Early life and career ==
Clair was born in Saint-Germain-de-Grantham and received his early education in that community and in Montreal, Quebec. He later earned a law degree from the Université de Sherbrooke and was called to the bar of Quebec in 1974. He worked as a legal aid lawyer in Drummondville from 1974 to 1976 and earned a master's degree in criminology from the Université de Montréal. Clair also wrote for a local newspaper and appeared on the radio station CHRD-FM.

== Legislator ==
Clair was elected to the Quebec legislature in the 1976 provincial election for the division of Drummond. The Parti Québécois won a majority government in this election, and Clair entered the legislature as a backbench supporter of René Lévesque's government. On May 17, 1979, he was promoted to parliamentary assistant to the minister of consumer affairs, cooperatives and financial institutions. At the time, he was the youngest cabinet minister in Quebec history.

=== Cabinet minister ===
Revenue minister

Clair joined the Lévesque cabinet as revenue minister on September 21, 1979. In late 1980, he announced that Quebec would stop charging the provincial sales tax on advertising flyers in newspapers. He explained that neighbouring provinces did not tax the flyers, and that Quebec's printing industry had accordingly been at a disadvantage.

Transport minister

Clair was re-elected in the 1981 provincial election and was shifted to the position of transport minister on April 30, 1981. He completed an agreement with federal minister Jean-Luc Pepin the same June to modernize commuter transit in the Montreal area. The following month, however, he criticized the federal government for cancelling some regional train services and said that the closures would not have been necessary if proposed upgrades had been made five years earlier. In November 1981, Clair announced an appeal to the Federal Court of Canada to stop the federal government's planned cutbacks.

In February 1982, Clair introduced legislation stipulating that all persons in the front seat of a moving vehicle be required to wear a seatbelt; taxi drivers, police, and young children had previously been exempted. He later introduced restrictions on the use of government planes by cabinet ministers. In May 1982, he announced that Quebec would end its use of bilingual stop signs by 1987, leaving only the French word "arrêt" on the famous octagonal red sign.

Clair took part in negotiations in 1982–83 to save the financially troubled Quebecair, North America's only French-language airline. He reached an agreement in principle with Ontario transport minister James Snow in August 1982 that would have seen a merger of Nordair and Quebecair with involvement from Air Ontario. The federal government rejected this plan and instead suggested replacing Quebecair with a new service co-owned by Air Canada and the Quebec government. Clair ultimately declined this proposal and announced in June 1983 that the Quebec government would take over and restructure the airline. This was not intended as a nationalization; Clair said that he hoped private investors would manage the company.

Clair strongly criticized the Canadian National Railway's decision in 1983 to shift its administrative offices for trucking and express services from Montreal to Toronto.

Treasury Board President

After a cabinet shuffle on March 5, 1984, Clair was named as president of the treasury board and minister responsible for administration. In early 1985, he introduced new labour legislation that cut the right of public-sector workers to strike over money issues, established a joint labour-management committee to study economic conditions and pay increases, and decentralized some aspects of bargaining to reflect local conditions. Quebec Federation of Labour president Louis Laberge and other labour leaders opposed some aspects of the bill, particularly the restrictions on the right to strike. The Lévesque government passed the legislation after invoking closure on debate.

Clair announced in March 1985 that Quebec would spend $27.4 billion in the 1985–86 fiscal year, an increase of 5.7 per cent over the previous year.

Internal PQ crisis

In 1984, the Parti Québécois went through an internal crisis over its support for Quebec sovereignty. Some leading party figures, including René Lévesque, wanted to moderate the party's position, while others favoured a more hardline stance in support of Quebec independence Clair sided with the moderates. When delegates at a party conference voted to tie the PQ to a hardline indépendantiste stand in the next provincial election, Clair quipped that he had "never seen turkeys so eager for Christmas."

The PQ's divisions continued until November 1984, when several indépendantiste hardliners resigned from the government. Clair served as acting minister of social affairs from November 27 to November 29, replacing one of the departed ministers until a full-time replacement was found.

Treasury Board/Energy and Resources

René Lévesque resigned as Parti Québécois leader and premier in June 1985, and Clair supported Pierre-Marc Johnson's successful bid to become the party's new leader. Johnson became premier in October 1985 and announced a cabinet shuffle on October 17, keeping Clair in the treasury board portfolio and giving him extra responsibilities as minister of energy and resources. On November 11, Clair approved almost two million dollars in mining exploration grants for seven companies.

The Parti Québécois lost the 1985 provincial election to the Quebec Liberal Party, and Clair was defeated in Drummond by the narrow margin of 102 votes. He formally resigned from cabinet with the rest of the Johnson ministry on December 12, 1985.

== Out of government ==
After the 1985 election, Clair worked as chief of staff to Pierre-Marc Johnson in the latter's role as leader of the official opposition. He resigned in December 1986 for what he described as "purely personal reasons." Clair later served as leader of the Quebec Association of Nursing Homes from 1987 to 1994; in September 1989, he described as strike by hospital and health-care workers as "unthinkable" in terms of its effects on elderly residents.

Clair traveled to Romania with a Montreal television crew in late 1989 to record a series of reports on the status of the country's minority Hungarian community. One of these reports included a clandestine interview with László Tőkés, who was arrested shortly after the broadcast of Dracula's Shadow – The Real Story Behind the Romanian Revolution took place. Tőkés's arrest helped trigger the Romanian Revolution of 1989, and some have suggested that Clair's interview played a significant role in provoking the latter event.

Clair became president of the venture capital firm Fondel Drummond in 1990.

== Deputy minister and Hydro-Quebec administrator ==
The Parti Québécois were returned to office with a majority government under Jacques Parizeau's leadership in the 1994 provincial election. Clair was not a candidate in the election but was appointed as deputy minister of energy and resources on November 28, 1994. By virtue of this position, he also served on the board of Hydro-Quebec. He resigned as deputy minister on May 5, 1997, to become executive vice-president of Hydro-Quebec's international affairs and projects group as well as president and chief executive officer of Hydro-Quebec International.

In September 1997, Clair announced that a new company co-owned by Hydro-Quebec would undertake a partnership with Pan American Enterprises to create a network of compressed natural gas stations in Mexico. He later helped negotiate deals for Hydro-Quebec in countries such as China, Peru, Costa Rica, Panama, and Senegal. He stood down as president of Hydro-Quebec International in late 1999.

== Health services ==
Clair was appointed by the government of Quebec to chair a commission on health and social services in 2000. While the commission held its hearings, some critics charged that Clair was biased in favour of privatization; he rejected this charge. Clair's report was submitted in January 2001, and its recommendations included an increased role for the private sector in health delivery, user fees on items such as meals and laundry for hospital patients, the guaranteed access of all Quebeckers to a family doctor, and the creation of a new publicly funded insurance plan to support treatment for disabled elderly persons. The report also suggested that some aspects of the Canada Health Act were outdated and led to unequal services; one example provided was that all doctor's visits were covered, while home care was not.

Clair later co-chaired a follow-up review of health services with Claude Castonguay, commissioned by the newspaper La Presse. This report also recommended restructuring the health system.

Clair became president of the Sedna Health Group Inc. in 2001. In 2009, he joined the advisory board of Barrett Xplore.

== Electoral record ==
1985 Quebec general election: Drummond
Party	Candidate	Votes	%	±%
Liberal	Jean-Guy St-Roch	16,584	47.93	
Parti Québécois	Michel Clair	16,482	47.64	
Progressive Conservative	Pauline Fecteau	947	2.74	
New Democratic Party	Michel Parenteau	585	1.69	
Total valid votes		34,598	100.00	
Rejected and declined votes		391		
Turnout		34,989	79.85	
Electors on the lists		43,817		

1981 Quebec general election: Drummond
Party	Candidate	Votes	%	±%
Parti Québécois	Michel Clair	19,359	55.31	
Liberal	Charles-Auguste Desrochers	13,448	38.42	
Union Nationale	Alain Chapdelaine	2,099	6.00	–
Marxist–Leninist	Jean-Pierre Ginchereau	95	0.27	
Total valid votes		35,001	100.00	
Rejected and declined votes		346		
Turnout		35,347	84.44	
Electors on the lists		41,862		

1976 Quebec general election: Drummond
Party	Candidate	Votes	%	±%
Parti Québécois	Michel Clair	14,605	42.45	
Union Nationale	Roger Blais	8,211	23.87	–
Liberal	Paul Delisle	7,778	22.61	
Ralliement créditiste	André Bergeron	3,601	10.47	
Parti national populaire	Armand Joyal	211	0.61	
Total valid votes		34,406	100.00	
Rejected and declined votes		506		
Turnout		34,912	89.05	
Electors on the lists		39,205		
