= Drummondville Transit =

Public transportation in Quebec, Canada

Commission de transport de Drummondville

- Founded: 1987
- Headquarters: 415, rue Lindsay
- Locale: Drummondville, Quebec
- Service type: bus service, taxibus
- Routes: 5
- Website: Transport en commun (in French)

The Drummondville Transit Commission (la Commission de transport de Drummondville (CTD)) is responsible for public transportation in the city of Drummondville in the Centre-du-Québec region of Quebec, Canada.

The system consists of six regular bus routes (1-6) which operate every half-hour on weekdays and every half-hour on weekends, and two weekend-only bus routes that operate every half-hour.

== Bus routes ==
All routes operate out of the main downtown bus terminal at Des Forges and Lindsay Streets.

- 1 - Downtown to Drummondville-Sud, along Boul. Mercure (provides service to Hôpital Sainte-Croix)
- 2 - Downtown to Drummondville-Nord, along Boul. St-Joseph (provides service to the CEGEP and several large shopping centres)
- 3 - Downtown to Drummondville-Nord, along Boul. Des Pins
- 4 - Downtown to Quartier St-Jean-Baptiste (provides service to the CEGEP)
- 5 - North–south route from Drummondville-Nord (Promenades Drummondville) to Saint-Nicéphore (Place Charpentier)
- 6 - Downtown to St-Charles-de-Drummond along Boul. de l'Université
- 7 - Super C strip mall on Boul. St-Joseph to the city's southwest industrial area
- 8 - Super C strip mall to Grantham and the surrounding industrial area
