= Drummond (Province of Canada electoral district) =

Electoral district in former Province of Canada

Province of Canada electoral district

Defunct pre-Confederation electoral district
- Legislature: Legislative Assembly of the Province of Canada
- District created: 1841
- District abolished: 1867
- First contested: 1841
- Last contested: 1863

Drummond was an electoral district of the Legislative Assembly of the Parliament of the Province of Canada, in Canada East. It was created in 1841, based on the previous electoral district of the same name for the Legislative Assembly of Lower Canada, in a rural area to the north-east of Montreal. It was represented by one member in the Legislative Assembly.

The electoral district was abolished in 1867, upon the creation of Canada and the province of Quebec.

== Boundaries ==
The Union Act, 1840 merged the two provinces of Upper Canada and Lower Canada into the Province of Canada, with a single Parliament. The separate parliaments of Lower Canada and Upper Canada were abolished.

The Union Act provided that the pre-existing electoral boundaries of Lower Canada and Upper Canada would continue to be used in the new Parliament, unless altered by the Union Act itself. The Drummond electoral district of Lower Canada was not altered by the Act, and therefore continued with the same boundaries which had been set by a statute of Lower Canada in 1829:

The County of Drummond shall contain the Townships of Aston, Bulstrode, Stanfold, Arthabasaka, Chester, Ham, Wotton, Tingwick, Warwick, Horton, Wendover, Simpson, Kingsey, Durham and Gore, Wickham, Grantham, Upton and Acton, together with all the gores and augmentations of the said Townships.

Drummond was thus located to the north-east of Montreal, south of the Saint Lawrence River, in the area now known as the Centre-du-Québec. Drummondville was the major town in the electoral district, and was the location of the elections.

== Members of the Legislative Assembly ==
Drummond was a single-member constitutency in the Legislative Assembly.

The following were the members of the Legislative Assembly from Drummond. "Party" was a fluid concept, especially during the early years of the Province of Canada. Party affiliations are based on the biographies of individual members given by the National Assembly of Quebec, as well as votes in the Legislative Assembly.

Parliament	Member	Years in Office	Party
1st Parliament; 1841–1844	Robert Nugent Watts	1841–1844	Tory

== Abolition ==
The district was abolished on July 1, 1867, when the British North America Act, 1867 came into force, splitting the Province of Canada into Quebec and Ontario. It was succeeded by electoral districts of the same name in the House of Commons of Canada and the Legislative Assembly of Quebec.
