= William John Watts =

Canadian politician (1846–1907)

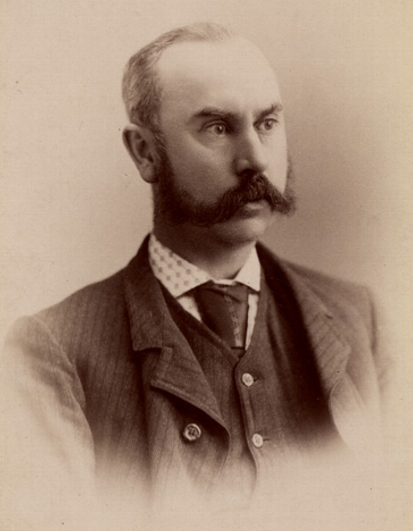

Member of the Legislative Assembly of Quebec for Drummond-Arthabaska
- In office 1874–1885
- Preceded by: Wilfrid Laurier
- Succeeded by: Joseph-Éna Girouard
- In office 1890–1892
- Preceded by: Joseph-Éna Girouard
- Succeeded by: Joseph Peter Cooke
- In office 1897–1901
- Preceded by: Joseph Peter Cooke
- Succeeded by: Joseph Laferté

Personal details
- Born: May 1, 1846 Drummondville, Canada East
- Died: September 4, 1907 (aged 61) Drummondville, Quebec
- Relations: Robert Nugent Watts, father

William John Watts (May 1, 1846 – September 4, 1907) was a businessman, lawyer and political figure in Quebec. He represented Drummond-Arthabaska in the Legislative Assembly of Quebec from 1874 to 1885 and Drummond from 1890 to 1892 and from 1897 to 1901 as a Conservative.

He was born in Drummondville, Canada East, the son of Robert Nugent Watts and Charlotte Sheppard. His maternal grandparents were botanist and ornithologist Harriet Sheppard and merchant William Sheppard.

Watts studied at McGill University, was called to the Quebec bar in 1869 and set up practice in Drummondville. He also owned several mills. He was first elected to the Quebec assembly in an 1874 by-election held after Wilfrid Laurier was elected to the House of Commons. In 1882, he married Mary Louisa Millar. Watts resigned his seat in 1885 following the execution of Louis Riel. He was defeated by Joseph Peter Cooke when he ran for reelection in 1892. He resigned his seat in 1901 after he was named registrar for Montreal West and served until his death in Drummondville at the age of 61.
