= Drummond (provincial electoral district) =

Former provincial electoral district in Quebec, Canada

Coordinates: 45.900°N 72.450°W

Quebec electoral district

Defunct provincial electoral district
- Legislature: National Assembly of Quebec
- District created: 1890
- District abolished: 2011
- First contested: 1890
- Last contested: 2008

Demographics
- Electors (2008): 57,967
- Area (km²): 467.1
- Census division: Drummond (part)
- Census subdivision(s): Drummondville (part), Saint-Edmond-de-Grantham, Saint-Eugène, Saint-Germain-de-Grantham, Saint-Majorique-de-Grantham

Drummond (Canadian French: [dʁɔmɔnd]) is a former provincial electoral district in the Centre-du-Québec region of Quebec, Canada, which elected members to the National Assembly of Quebec. As of its final election, it consisted of most of the city of Drummondville and all of Saint-Edmond-de-Grantham, Saint-Eugène, Saint-Germain-de-Grantham, and Saint-Majorique-de-Grantham.

It was created for the 1890 election from parts of the former Drummond-Arthabaska electoral district. Its final election was in 2008. It disappeared in the 2012 election and its successor electoral districts were Drummond–Bois-Francs and Johnson.

The riding as well as the city of Drummondville were named in honour of former War of 1812 general Gordon Drummond.

== Members of the Legislative Assembly / National Assembly ==
- William John Watts, Liberal (1890–1892)
- Joseph Peter Cooke, Conservative Party (1892–1897)
- William John Watts, Liberal (1897–1901)
- Joseph Laferté, Liberal (1901–1909)
- Louis-Jules Allard, Liberal (1910–1916)
- Hector Laferté, Liberal (1916–1935)
- Arthur Rajotte, Liberal (1935–1936)
- Joseph Marier, Union Nationale (1936–1939)
- Arthur Rajotte, Liberal (1939–1944)
- Robert Bernard, Union Nationale (1944–1952)
- Bernard Pinard, Liberal (1952–1956)
- Robert Bernard, Union Nationale (1956–1960)
- Bernard Pinard, Liberal (1960–1973)
- Robert Malouin, Liberal (1973–1976)
- Michel Clair, Parti Québécois (1976–1985)
- Jean-Guy St-Roch, Liberal (1985–1994)
- Normand Jutras, Parti Québécois (1994–2007)
- Sébastien Schneeberger, ADQ (2007–2008)
- Yves-François Blanchet, Parti Québécois (2008–2012)

== Election results ==
2008 Quebec general election
Party	Candidate	Votes	%	±%
Parti Québécois	Yves-Francois Blanchet	11,480	34.40	
Liberal	Jacques Sigouin	10,860	32.54	
Action démocratique	Sébastien Schneeberger	9,757	29.23	
Québec solidaire	Luce Daneau	1,279	3.83	

== See also ==
- List of Quebec provincial electoral districts
- Canadian provincial electoral districts
