= Hector Laferté =

Canadian politician (1885–1971)

Hector Laferté QC
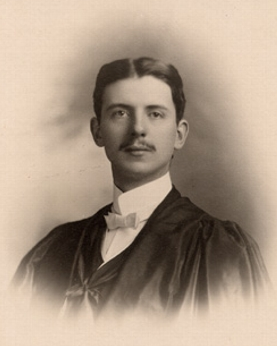

Member of the Legislative Assembly of Quebec for Drummond
- In office 1919–1934
- Preceded by: Jules Allard
- Succeeded by: Arthur Rajotte

Member of the Legislative Council of Quebec for Stadacona
- In office 1934–1968
- Preceded by: William Gerard Power
- Succeeded by: Legislative Council was abolished in 1968

Personal details
- Born: November 8, 1885 Saint-Germain-de-Grantham, Quebec
- Died: September 13, 1971 (aged 85) Quebec City, Quebec
- Party: Liberal

Hector Laferté, QC (French pronunciation: [ɛktɔʁ lafɛʁte]; November 8, 1885 – September 13, 1971) was a lawyer and political figure in Quebec. He represented Drummond in the Legislative Assembly of Quebec from 1919 to 1934 as a member of the Quebec Liberal Party. Laferté was Speaker of the Legislative Assembly from 1924 to 1929.

He was born in Saint-Germain-de-Grantham, Drummond County, Quebec, the son of Joseph Laferté and Georgianna-Jeanne Tessier. Laferté was educated at the Collège de Nicolet and the Université Laval, was admitted to the Quebec bar in 1909 and set up practice in Quebec City in partnership with Antonin Galipeault, Philippe-Auguste Choquette, Louis Saint-Laurent and Ernest Lapointe, among others. He was parliamentary correspondent for La Libre parole. In 1911, he married Irène Sénécal. In 1919, Laferté was named King's Counsel.

He was first elected to the Quebec assembly in the 1916 election and was re-elected multiple times. He served in the provincial cabinet as Minister of Colonization and Minister of Mines and Fisheries from 1929 to 1934. In 1934, Laferté resigned his seat in the Quebec assembly after being named to the Legislative Council of Quebec for Stadacona division, serving until the council was abolished in 1968. He served as speaker for the council from 1934 to 1936, from 1940 to 1944 and from 1960 to 1966.

He died in Quebec City at the age of 85 and was buried in Drummondville.
