= Robert Nugent Watts =

Public official and politician in Province of Canada

Member of the Legislative Assembly of the Province of Canada for Drummond
- In office 1841 – 1851 (three elections)
- Preceded by: New position
- Succeeded by: John McDougall

Personal details
- Born: 1806
- Died: April 19, 1867 (aged 60–61)
- Party: Unionist; Tory
- Spouse: Charlotte Sheppard (m. 1839)
- Relations: Frederick Heriot (cousin)
- Children: William John Watts
- Occupation: Public official and landowner

Robert Nugent Watts (1806 – April 19, 1867) was a political figure in Canada East, Province of Canada (now in Quebec). He represented the electoral district of Drummond for ten years in the Legislative Assembly of the Province of Canada. He was a supporter of the union of Lower Canada and Upper Canada and a Tory.

== Family background ==
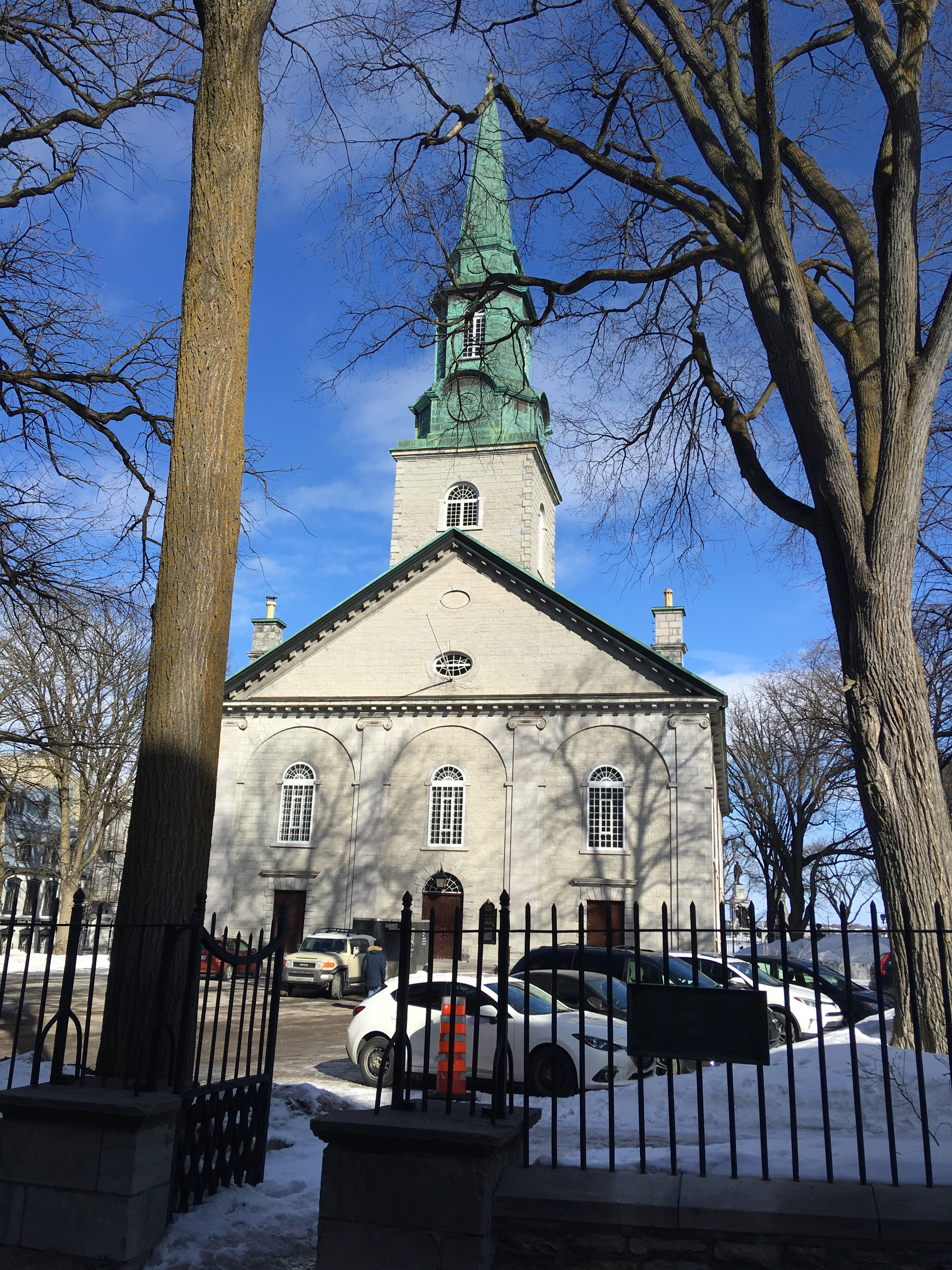
Cathedral of the Holy Trinity, Quebec City, where Watts married Charlotte Sheppard in 1839

Watts was born in 1806. In 1839, he married Charlotte Sheppard at the Anglican cathedral in Quebec, the Cathedral of the Holy Trinity. Their son, William John Watts, later served in the Legislative Assembly of Quebec.

Charlotte Sheppard was the daughter of botanist and ornithologist Harriet Sheppard and William Sheppard, a major lumber merchant. William Sheppard was appointed to the Executive Council of Lower Canada in September, 1837, shortly before the Lower Canada Rebellion broke out in 1837, but did not play a major role in the government of the province.

Watts was a public official, holding the office of Assistant Governor's Secretary in the government of Lower Canada. He also was a local landholder, and lieutenant colonel in the local militia. He lived in Drummondville in the home of his cousin Frederick Heriot. Heriot was appointed a member of the Special Council, after the Lower Canada Rebellion and the suspension of the provincial constitution by the British government. Heriot left Watts a large portion of his property in his will.

== Political career ==
Following the rebellion in Lower Canada, and the similar rebellion in 1837 in Upper Canada (now Ontario), the British government decided to merge the two provinces into a single province, as recommended by Lord Durham in the Durham Report. The Union Act, 1840, passed by the British Parliament, abolished the two provinces and their separate parliaments, and created the Province of Canada, with a single parliament for the entire province, composed of an elected Legislative Assembly and an appointed Legislative Council. The Governor General retained a strong position in the government.

Watts stood unopposed for election to the riding of Drummond and was acclaimed to the Legislative Assembly. In the first Parliament, Watts was a Tory and government supporter. He voted in favour of the union of Lower Canada and Upper Canada, and consistently supported the Governor General in the various disputes with the Reform group, which was campaigning for responsible government. He opposed the restructuring of the ministry in 1842 with a stronger Reform balance.

== See also ==
1st Parliament of the Province of Canada
