= Charles Page (politician) =

Canadian mountaineer and politician

- Page at the summit of Kangchenjunga, Nepal, on May 23, 2026

Member of the National Assembly of Quebec for Drummond–Bois-Francs
- Incumbent
- Assumed office October 5, 2026
- Preceded by: Sébastien Schneeberger

Parliamentary Assistant to the Minister responsible for Sports and Recreation
- Incumbent
- Assumed office October 28, 2026
- Premier: Paul St-Pierre Plamondon

Personal details
- Born: July 15, 1987 (age 39) Drummondville, Quebec, Canada
- Party: Parti Québécois
- Occupation: Mountaineer, entrepreneur

Charles Page (born July 15, 1987) is a Quebec adventurer, high-altitude mountaineer, entrepreneur, philanthropist and politician from Drummondville. He has represented Drummond–Bois-Francs in the National Assembly of Quebec as a member of the Parti Québécois since the 2026 Quebec general election.

He has climbed seven of the fourteen mountains over 8,000 metres (26,000 ft), a Quebec record, and is the first Canadian-born person to reach the summits of the world's five highest mountains.

== Mountaineering career ==
=== Peaks over 8,000 metres ===
There are fourteen mountains over 8,000 metres in the world, located in the Himalayas and the Karakoram. Between September 2023 and May 2026, Page climbed seven of them: Manaslu, Everest, Lhotse, Makalu, K2, Annapurna and Kangchenjunga. As of 2026, he is the Quebecer who has reached the summit of the most peaks over 8,000 metres.

These peaks include Everest, the highest in the world; K2, considered the most difficult of the fourteen peaks over 8,000 metres; and Annapurna, considered one of the most dangerous mountains in the world. On April 18, 2026, he became the first Quebecer to reach the summit of Annapurna.

On May 21, 2024, he reached the summit of Everest, then that of Lhotse, the fourth-highest mountain in the world, less than 24 hours later, a rarely achieved feat. He thus became the sixth Canadian to climb Everest and Lhotse within 24 hours.

In 2025, he attempted to climb Broad Peak, in the Karakoram, but turned back about 300 metres below the summit due to poor conditions. It is the only peak over 8,000 metres that he has attempted without reaching the summit.

On July 30, 2026, an avalanche on Broad Peak killed ten climbers, including British-Nepali mountaineer Nirmal Purja. Among the victims were five friends Page had met during his expeditions, including one who had accompanied him on Kangchenjunga and two with whom he had climbed Annapurna.

=== The world's five highest mountains ===
On May 23, 2026, he reached the summit of Kangchenjunga, the third-highest mountain in the world. He thus became the first Quebecer and the first Canadian-born person to climb the five highest mountains on Earth: Everest, K2, Kangchenjunga, Lhotse and Makalu. He completed these five ascents in two years and two days, between May 21, 2024, and May 23, 2026.

A sovereigntist, he displays the flag of Quebec at the summit of his climbs.

=== List of ascents ===
Peaks over 8,000 metres climbed by Charles Page
Mountain	Elevation	World rank	Summit date
Manaslu	8,163 m (26,781 ft)	8th	September 20, 2023
Everest	8,849 m (29,032 ft)	1st	May 21, 2024
Lhotse	8,516 m (27,940 ft)	4th	May 22, 2024
Makalu	8,485 m (27,838 ft)	5th	May 10, 2025
K2	8,611 m (28,251 ft)	2nd	August 11, 2025
Annapurna I	8,091 m (26,545 ft)	10th	April 18, 2026
Kangchenjunga	8,586 m (28,169 ft)	3rd	May 23, 2026

== Philanthropy ==
Since November 2023, Page has led fundraising campaigns for Enfant Soleil, in support of sick children and their families. By May 2026, the funds raised exceeded $200,000, directed in particular to the organization's Fonds sport et santé durable (Sport and Sustainable Health Fund). He described this total as "the greatest accomplishment of [his] life".

He also gives talks in Quebec schools.

== Political career ==
=== Candidacy and election ===
In August 2026, Page announced that he was ending his expeditions to peaks over 8,000 metres. That same month, the Parti Québécois confirmed his candidacy in the riding of Drummond–Bois-Francs for the October 5, 2026, general election.

On October 5, 2026, he was elected with 11,408 votes (30.58%) and a majority of 466 votes over Myriam Cournoyer of the Conservative Party of Quebec. He succeeded Sébastien Schneeberger of the Coalition Avenir Québec, who had represented the riding since 2012.

=== Parliamentary roles ===
On October 28, 2026, Premier Paul St-Pierre Plamondon appointed him parliamentary assistant to the minister responsible for sports and recreation, Méganne Perry Mélançon. He is also parliamentary secretary to the minister responsible for Quebec's accession to independence, Catherine Gentilcore, with responsibility for Quebec sports federations.

== Electoral record ==
2026 Quebec general election: Drummond–Bois-Francs
** Preliminary results — Not yet official **
Party	Candidate	Votes	%	±%
Parti Québécois	Charles Page	11,409	30.67	+15.62
Conservative	Myriam Courtnoyer	10,943	29.41	+12.02
Coalition Avenir Québec	Sébastien Schneeberger	7,233	19.44	–32.30
Liberal	Colin Hendry	4,516	12.14	+8.13
Québec solidaire	Lila Houde	2,586	6.95	–3.70
Green	Marco Beauchesne	287	0.77	–0.24
Présence	Sylvain Audet	230	0.62	N/A
Total valid votes		37,204	98.09	+0.17
Total rejected ballots		725	1.91	–0.17
Turnout		37,929	70.75	+1.15
Electors on the lists		53,611		
Parti Québécois gain from Coalition Avenir Québec		Swing		+1.80
Source: Élections Québec
