= Joseph Laferté =

Canadian politician

Member of the Legislative Assembly of Quebec for Drummond
- In office 1901–1909
- Preceded by: William John Watts
- Succeeded by: Jules Allard

Personal details
- Born: September 27, 1851 Saint-David, Canada East
- Died: May 1, 1930 (aged 78) Saint-Germain-de-Grantham
- Party: Quebec Liberal Party (QLP)

Joseph Laferté (French pronunciation: [ʒozɛf lafɛʁte]; September 27, 1851 – May 1, 1930) was a farmer, merchant and political figure in Quebec. He represented Drummond in the Legislative Assembly of Quebec from 1901 to 1909 as a Liberal.

He was born in Saint-David, Canada East, the son of Antoine Théroux dit Plessis et Laferté and Angèle Vanasse. Laferté was a director of the agricultural society for Drummond County and was a school commissioner for Saint-Germain-de-Grantham in 1894 and 1895. He was first elected to the Quebec assembly in a 1901 by-election held after William John Watts resigned his seat to accept an appointment. His election in 1908 was overturned in 1909 after an appeal. Laferté was co-registrar for Drummond County from 1912 to 1916 and was mayor of Saint-Germain-de-Grantham from 1912 to 1927. He served as warden for Drummond County in 1913 and 1914.

Laferté was married three times: to Aurélie Girard in 1874, to Georgianna-Jeanne Tessier in 1879 and to Délina Tessier in 1893. His son Hector went on to serve in the Quebec assembly.
