= Drummondville City Council =

Local Government of Drummondville, Quebec

Drummondville City Council (in French: Conseil municipal de Drummondville) is the governing body for the mayor–council government in the city of Drummondville, Quebec in the Centre-du-Québec region. The council consists of the mayor and 12 councillors.

== Current Drummondville City Council ==
As of 2025:

- Jean-François Houle, mayor
- Marc-André Lemire, District 1 councillor
- Marie-Josée Lemaire, District 2 councillor
- Catherine Lassonde, District 3 councillor
- Carole Léger, District 4 councillor
- Sarah Saint-Cyr Lanoie, District 5 councillor
- Jean-Philippe Tessier, District 6 councillor
- Isabelle Duchesne, District 7 councillor
- Caroline Allard, District 8 councillor
- Julie Létourneau, District 9 councillor
- Mario Sévigny, District 10 councillor
- Daniel Pelletier, District 11 councillor
- Cathy Bernier, District 12 councillor

== See also ==
- List of mayors of Drummondville
