= Normand Jutras =

Canadian lawyer and politician

MNA
- In office 1994–2007
- Preceded by: Jean-Guy St-Roch
- Succeeded by: Sébastien Schneeberger
- Constituency: Drummond

Personal details
- Born: November 23, 1948 (age 77)
- Party: Parti Québécois

Normand Jutras (born 23 November 1948) is a Canadian lawyer and politician from Quebec. From 1994 to 2007 he was an MNA in the National Assembly of Quebec, representing the provincial electoral district of Drummond as a member of the Parti Québécois.

== Life and career ==
Jutras was born in Drummondville. He earned a Bachelor of Arts at L'Externat Classique Saint Raphaël de Drummondville. He earned his law degree from Université de Montréal in 1971. He was admitted to the Bar of Quebec in 1972. He practiced privately at Jutras and Associates from 1971 to 1994. He served as Chairman of the Disciplinary Tribunal at Drummondville Institution from 1984 to 1993. Jutras represented the Attorney General of Canada in cases of drugs, foods and drugs, and other statutory laws from 1984 to 1994.

Jutras was elected to the National Assembly for the first time in the 1994 Quebec general election. He was re-elected in the 1998 Quebec general election and in the 2003 Quebec general election. Dion was defeated by Sébastien Schneeberger of ADC in the 2007 Quebec general election. Following his defeat, Jutras was involved in legal affairs for automotive companies with interests in India.

Since March 6, 2013, Jutras has been the head of the Public Curator of Quebec, the government body charged with protecting incapacitated individuals.
