= Sébastien Schneeberger =

Canadian politician

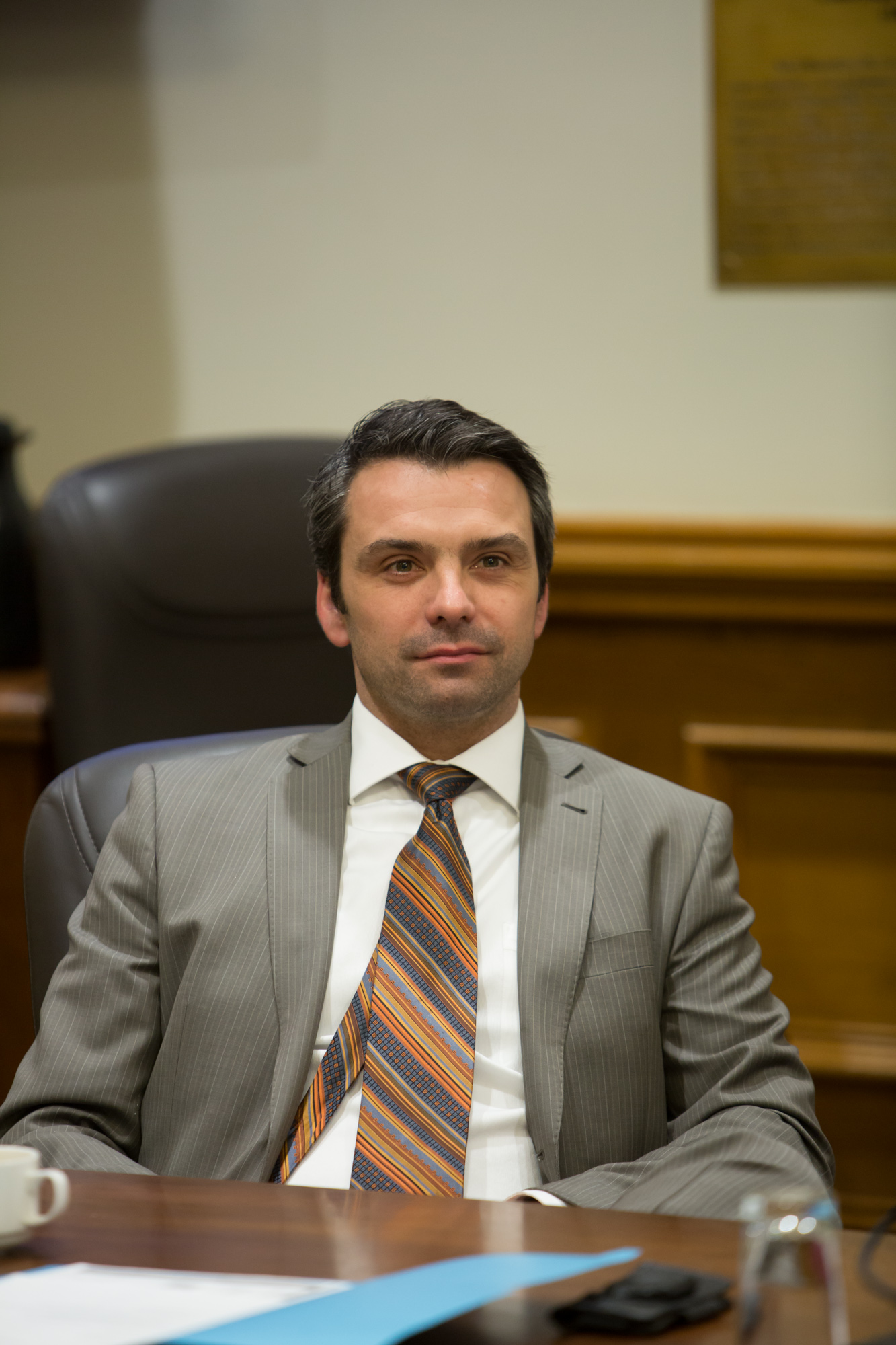

Member of the Quebec Legislative Assembly for Drummond–Bois-Francs Drummond (2007–2008)
- In office September 4, 2012 – October 5, 2026
- Preceded by: Yves-François Blanchet
- Succeeded by: Charles Page
- In office April 25, 2007 – November 5, 2008
- Preceded by: Normand Jutras
- Succeeded by: Yves-François Blanchet

Personal details
- Born: August 3, 1973 (age 53) Moutier, Switzerland
- Party: Coalition Avenir Québec
- Other political affiliations: Action démocratique du Québec

Sébastien Schneeberger (born August 3, 1973) is a Canadian politician who served as a member of the National Assembly of Quebec representing the electoral district of Drummond–Bois-Francs, previously known as Drummond, from 2007 to 2008 and again from 2012 to 2026. He was elected in 2007 as a member of Action démocratique du Québec and in 2012 as a member of the Coalition Avenir Québec.

== Personal life ==
Schneeberger was born in Moutier, Canton of Bern, Switzerland, and moved to Canada at the age of 10; his father is a Swiss immigrant.

Schneeberger obtained a college diploma in agricultural exploitation and management in 1994. He worked at a local farm in the Bois-Francs region for over 10 years and later worked as a trucker, technical adviser, sales adviser and manufacturing agent for various businesses in Drummondville. He also a founder for the young businesspeople association in the Centre-du-Quebec region.

== Political career ==
Schneeberger was first elected in the 2007 election with 39% of the vote. Parti Québécois incumbent Normand Jutras, who was running for a fourth term, finished second with 33% of the vote. Schneeberger took office on April 12, 2007 and was named the critic for aboriginal affairs until a Shadow Cabinet shuffle in May 2008. He was defeated by Yves-François Blanchet of the Parti Québécois in the 2008 election; following the electoral redistribution that preceded the 2012 election, Schneeberger won election in the new Drummond–Bois-Francs riding, while Blanchet was simultaneously reelected in the neighbouring riding of Johnson.

== Electoral history ==
2022 Quebec general election: Drummond–Bois-Francs
Party	Candidate	Votes	%	±%
Coalition Avenir Québec	Sébastien Schneeberger	18,747	51.64	-4.66
Conservative	Myriam Cournoyer	6,314	17.39	+15.29
Parti Québécois	Emrick Couture-Picard	5,462	15.05	+2.51
Québec solidaire	Tony Martel	3,866	10.65	-4.36
Liberal	Pierre Poirier	1,455	4.01	-9.01
Green	Marco Beauchesne	367	1.01	–
Équipe Autonomiste	Steve Therion	91	0.25	-0.05
Total valid votes		36,302	98.26	–
Total rejected ballots		641	1.74	-0.51
Turnout		36,943	69.60	+0.78
Electors on the lists		53,078	–	–
Coalition Avenir Québec hold		Swing		-9.97

2018 Quebec general election: Drummond-Bois-Francs
Party	Candidate	Votes	%	±%
Coalition Avenir Québec	Sébastien Schneeberger	19,577	56.3	+16.38
Québec solidaire	Lannïck Dinard	5,221	15.01	+8.8
Liberal	Kevin Deland	4,527	13.02	-12.21
Parti Québécois	Diane Roy	4,360	12.54	-13.75
Conservative	Francois Picard	733	2.11	+1.27
Independent	Sylvain Marcoux	250	0.72	
Équipe Autonomiste	Steve Therion	106	0.3	
Total valid votes		34,774	97.76	
Total rejected ballots		798	2.24	
Turnout		35,572	68.82	
Eligible voters		51,691		
Coalition Avenir Québec hold		Swing		+3.79
Source(s) "Rapport des résultats officiels du scrutin". Élections Québec.

2014 Quebec general election
Party	Candidate	Votes	%
Coalition Avenir Québec	Sébastien Schneeberger	13,600	39.92
Parti Québécois	Daniel Lebel	8,958	26.29
Liberal	Isabelle Chabot	8,595	25.23
Québec solidaire	Francis Soulard	2,116	6.21
Parti nul	Frédéric Bélanger	361	1.06
Conservative	François Picard	285	0.84
Option nationale	Alexandre Phénix	155	0.45
Total valid votes		34,070	98.34
Total rejected ballots		575	1.66
Turnout		34,645	69.23
Electors on the lists		50,041	–

2012 Quebec general election
Party	Candidate	Votes	%	±%
Coalition Avenir Québec	Sébastien Schneeberger	13,879	37.59	+12.78
Parti Québécois	Annie Jean	11,374	30.80	-1.28
Liberal	Marie Désilets	8,230	22.29	-17.25
Québec solidaire	Francis Soulard	1,607	4.35	+0.86
Option nationale	Martin Allard	950	2.57	
Conservative	François Picard	421	1.14	
Independents	Pierre Hébert	355	0.96	
Unité Nationale	Robert Dufour	107	0.29	
Coalition Avenir Québec gain from Liberal		Swing		+14.53

^ Change is from redistributed results; CAQ change is from ADQ

2008 Quebec general election
Party	Candidate	Votes	%	±%
Parti Québécois	Yves-Francois Blanchet	11,480	34.40	
Liberal	Jacques Sigouin	10,860	32.54	
Action démocratique	Sébastien Schneeberger	9,757	29.23	
Québec solidaire	Luce Daneau	1,279	3.83	
