= Marie Rose Ferron =

Roman Catholic mystic and stagmatist

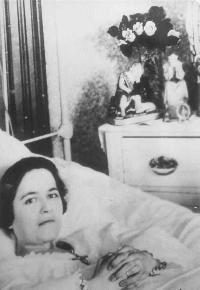
Marie Rose Ferron

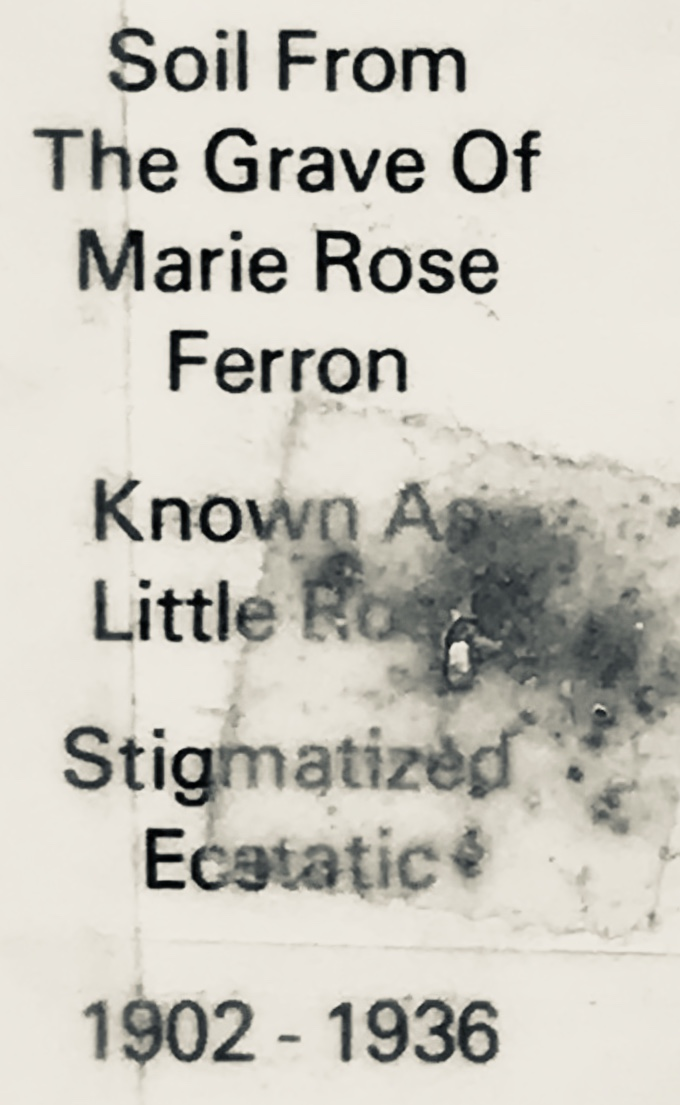
Detail of the second-class relic of the soil from the grave of Marie Rose Ferron

Marie Rose Ferron (24 May 1902 – 11 May 1936), often called the Little Rose, was a purported Canadian-American Roman Catholic mystic and stigmatist.

Ferron was inducted into the Rhode Island Heritage Hall of Fame in 2017.

== Life ==
Ferron was born in Saint-Germain-de-Grantham, Quebec, as the tenth child of a large and devout Catholic family which moved to Fall River, Massachusetts in 1906. It is said that she was six years old when she had her first vision of Jesus, as a child, carrying a cross. "He was looking at me with sadness in His eyes," she once said.

At the age of 13, Ferron was stricken with a mysterious paralysis and painful contraction of the muscles, forcing her to walk with crutches for several years until her twisted and clubbed feet confined her to a bed for the rest of her life. Because her muscles would sometimes painfully contract, making it very difficult to straighten once again, a flat board was placed on her narrow bed to which she was rigidly strapped. She also suffered an intestinal problem that made it difficult to digest solid food and contracted tetanus and pyorrhea.

The family relocated to Woonsocket, Rhode Island in 1925, where, the following year, her stigmata first appeared. By Lent 1927 the wounds began to appear regularly every Friday. Ferron lived in constant pain until her death in 1936 at the age of 33. The number of mourners attending her funeral attest to her popularity in the Franco-American community.

Her apparent stigmata (including a crown of thorns) were repeatedly photographed and featured what appears to be a stylized wire thorn pattern. There are those that have considered her the first American stigmatist.

An inquiry into the cause of Ferron's canonization was conducted by Bishop Russell McVinney of Providence, Rhode Island and ended in 1964 with the bishop deciding against further proceedings. The Diocese of Providence issued a formal decree stating that "any further action to promote the cause of Rose Ferron is not warranted."

== See also ==
- Alexandrina of Balazar
- Anne Catherine Emmerich
- Faustina Kowalska
- Maria Domenica Lazzeri
- Maria Valtorta
- Marthe Robin
- Thérèse of Lisieux

== Sources ==
- Jeanne S. Bonin, A Stigmatist: Marie-Rose Ferron Editions Paulines, 1988 ISBN 2-89039-161-2
- Rev. O.A. Boyer, She Wears a Crown of Thorns: Marie Rose Ferron, 1958 ASIN B0007I5UMS
- Freze, Michael (1993). They bore the wounds of Christ. OSV Publishing. ISBN 0-87973-422-1.
- Marie Rose Ferron –American Mystic, Stigmatic and Visionary (1902-1936)
