= Community of the Beatitudes =

- Orientation: Catholic
- Polity: Hierarchical
- Region: France, Belgium, U.S., Switzerland, Canada, Germany, Liban, Hungary, China, Brazil, Italy, Mexico, New Zealand, Slovakia, Czech Republic, Spain, Côte d'Ivoire, Israel
- Founder: Gérard Croissant
- Official website: www.beatitudes.org

The Community of the Beatitudes is one of the "new communities" established in the Catholic Church after the Second Vatican Council (1962–1965) in the movement of the Charismatic Renewal Movement. It was founded in France in 1973, and came under the ecclesial authority of the Archbishop of Albi in southern France since May 1975 (Foundation in Cordes). It was recognised in 2002 by the Holy See as an association of the faithful. On December 3, 2008, the Pontifical Council for the Laity asked the Community to change its canonical form and come under the authority of the Congregation for Institutes of Consecrated Life and Societies of Apostolic Life. On June 29, 2011, the Holy See recognized the Community of the Beatitudes as a Public Association of the Faithful under the ecclesial authority of the Archbishop of Toulouse. On December 8, 2020, The Holy See recognized the Community of the Beatitudes as an Ecclesial Family of Consecrated Life of diocesan right by the Congregation for Institutes of Consecrated Life (CIVCSVA). This is the first community of consecrated life to be erected under the title.

Situated in the charismatic renewal movement, its spirituality is both Eucharistic and Marian, inspired by the Carmelite tradition and living out the spirit of the Beatitudes (Matthew chapter 5). It gathers together the faithful of all states of life (families, single people, priests and consecrated brothers and sisters), who share a common vocation of prayer and fraternal communion, combining a marked contemplative dimension with numerous apostolic and missionary activities such as parishes, hospital and health care, Marian sanctuaries, retreat centers and ministry to the poor.

In the past, the community was the subject of complaints in justice and judicial investigations showing questionable practices: the MIVILUDES asked the prefect of Haute-Garonne to check the legality of voluntary work. The Community of the Beatitudes sued certain newspapers and authors for such allegations and won convictions on the ground of libel.

== History ==
The community was founded in Montpellier on 25 May 1973 by two couples, as the "Community of the Lion of Judah and the Slain Lamb" (Communauté du Lion de Juda et de l'Agneau Immolé). One of the founders, Gérard Croissant, had previously decided to become a Protestant pastor. However, he embraced Catholicism in 1975 and was ordained deacon in 1978 under the name "Brother Ephraim" (Frère Éphraïm).

In 1984, there were 300 members in 15 houses, six being outside France, according to the community. In 1991, it was named "Community of the Beatitudes".

== Status ==
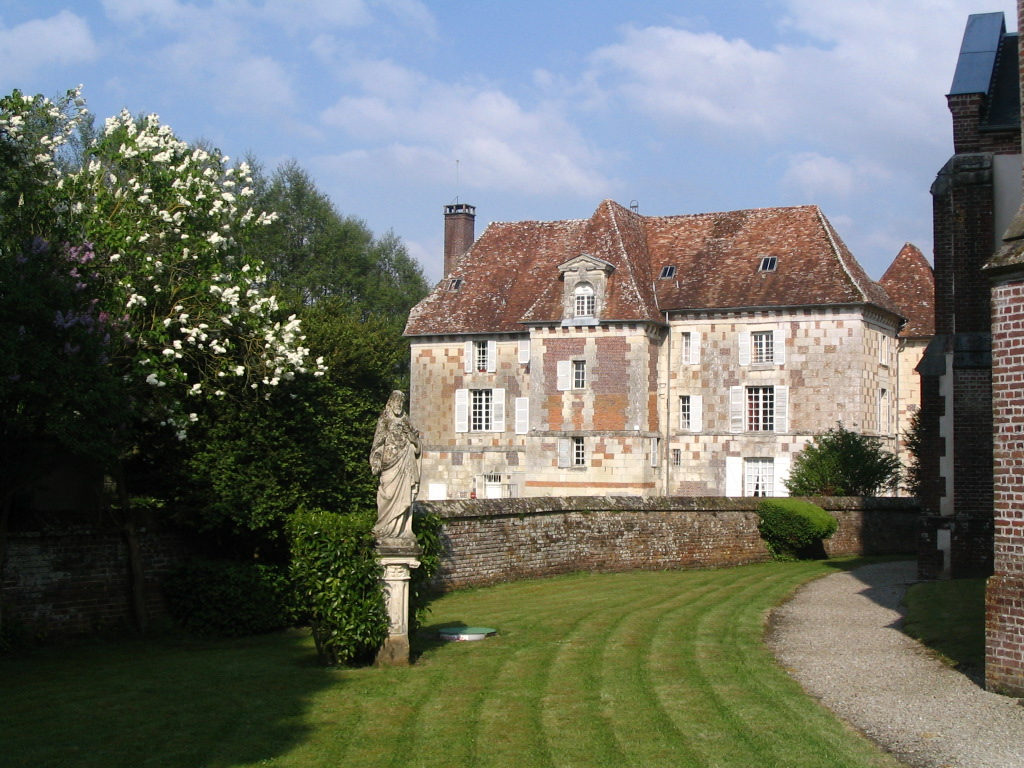
The castel of Hermival-les-Vaux (Calvados) owned by the Community of the Beatitudes.

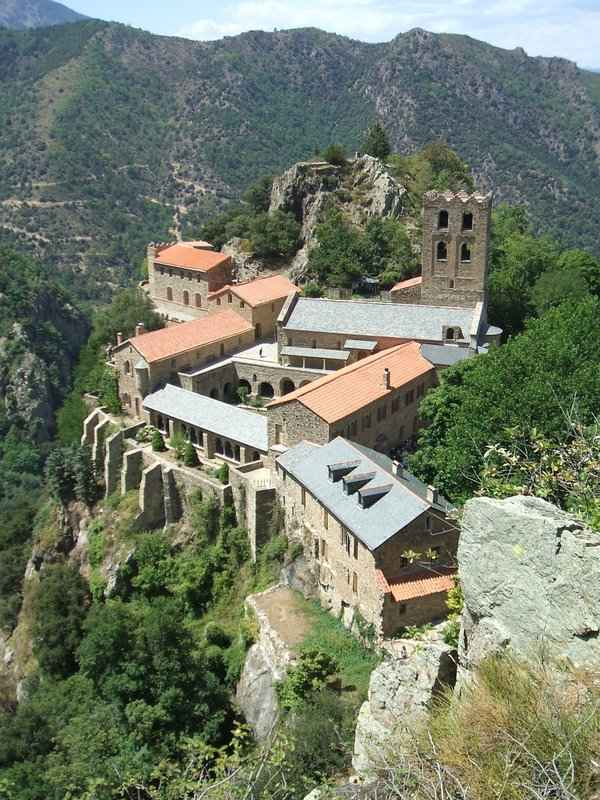
The monastery of Martin-du-Canigou (Pyrénées-Orientales), occupied by the Community of the Beatitudes since 1987.

On 19 January 1979, the community was first recognised by the Catholic Church at the diocesan level by Robert-Joseph Coffy, Archbishop of Albi, as a "pious union". On 1 January 1985, the community was recognised by the same archbishop as a "private association of faithful of diocesan right".

On 8 December 2002, it was established as an "international private association of the faithful" of pontifical right by the Pontifical Council for the Laity of the Holy See, and its statutes were approved on an experimental basis for five years. A general moderator was placed at the head of the community.

In December 2007, the community announced that the Pontifical Council had extended the provisional for a period of two years during which there was to be a clarification of the statutes as well as the canonical status of members. Meanwhile, religious authorities gave very precise guidelines to the community. Members had to clarify their purpose, namely to choose the monastic life or that of a community of lay people. It was also asked of the Beatitudes to cease psychotherapy practices within the community. Persons living in families were to have separate and independent housing, paid employment and the social security coverage provided by law. Finally, the authorities said they had noted the use of the expression "children community", which was deemed as "unacceptable".

This clarification was to have been made at the general meeting of the community, in November 2008. Following a request by Cardinal Bernard Panafieu, charged by the Holy See with responsibility for the Beatitudes, it was postponed because of legal proceedings against the leadership of the community.

In 2010 the community numbered almost 100 priests, 40 seminarians, 350 consecrated sisters, and hundreds of lay members in 70 houses, in 30 countries and on all continents, at the request of bishops in more than 60 dioceses. This clarification required greater separation between the different canonical states of life.), as well as the abandonment of the practice of psycho-spiritual sessions.

== Practices ==
This community belongs to the charismatic ecclesial movements founded after the Second Vatican Council. The houses, divided in three branches (brothers, sisters, lay members) are entrusted to a "coordinator", in charge of the unity and mission of the particular house. To permanently engage in this contemplative community, seven years of "discernment" are required.

The community says it has a spirituality inspired from Carmelites: they practice silence, fasting and "prayer of the heart". Prayer is an important element of the spirituality through the practices of silent prayer, prayer beads, Rosary, Liturgy of the Hours and permanent Eucharistic adoration. For the liturgy, members use such things as incense, chrism and Orthodox icons.

The community is also characterised by religious practices inspired by Judaism, reflecting a desire to rediscover the Jewish roots of Christianity. Members celebrate seventh-day Sabbath and practice dances of Israel in praise of God. These dances, similar to the Hora and the Debke, are sometimes performed on Friday evening (when Sabbath begins), but more often on Saturday evening after Vespers of the Resurrection.

The community focuses on the "new evangelization" as asked for by Pope John Paul II. It has a publishing house, the "Beatitudes Editions" (Éditions des Béatitudes) and published Fire and Light (Feu et Lumière), a monthly magazine of prayer texts. It also has Radio Ecclesia, a radio in the diocese of Nîmes, and Maria Multimédia which produces audio CDs, cassettes, videos, DVDs and CD-Rom.

== Controversies ==
In 1996, former members criticised what they saw as the misuse of power by a strict obedience leading to an infantilization. They also accused the community of promoting everyday events as miraculous, and believing that any problem may be solved by religious means. In 1998, the community was even listed as cult in a book named Dictionary of Cults, published by the Centre against Mental Manipulations (Centre contre les Manipulations Mentales).

The French Catholic bishops strongly reacted to these publications and rejected the accusation of the existence of cults within the Catholic Church. Bishop Jean Vernette, appointed national secretary of French episcopate for the study of cults and new religious movements and also member of the CCMM, also complained in January 2001, regretting that "groups within Church officially recognized by the ecclesial authority", including the Community of the Beatitudes, are "wrongly" labelled as cults, and also warned against a confirmed deviance by some people, according to him, who "want to use the anti-cult fight as a rocket for an anti-religious fight", spreading "the usual thought line of the Rationalist Union, the freethought and the Freemasonry in its atheist version".

In February 2008, in France, one of the brothers of the community, admitted the sexual abuse of 50 children aged from five to fourteen years. According to an article by Le Nouvel Observateur, some testimonies confirmed the lack of action by the leadership towards this case of pedophilia. The four members of the Community where he lived were evicted too and asked the local bishop to intervene. The Community responded that they were evicted not because they disclosed the case (as they state) but “due to their persistent refusal to obey the Community’s decision to close this house for financial and pastoral reasons.”

In October 2008, the Direction centrale de la police judiciaire also investigated after complaints of sexual abuses and the suicide of a teenage alumnus of a Private High-School entrusted to the Community of the Beatitudes in east of France.

In 2008 Gérard Croissant was relieved of the exercise of diaconal ministry and forced to leave the community. At that time he was asked to withdraw to a life of silence, prayer and penance; however, he continued to speak to groups, outside of the Community. In October 2010 the Holy See sent Father Henry Donneaud as Pontifical Commissioner to replace the existing leadership of the Community and supervise its canonical changes towards an “Ecclesial Family of Consecrated Life” (under the authority of the Congregation for Institutes of Consecrated Life and Societies of Apostolic Life). On November 17, 2011, Father Donneaud announced that the founder of the Community, former Deacon Gérard (Ephraim) Croissant, had committed "crimes against the moral law of the church" and had acknowledged "serious failures" in sexual matters, particularly in regard to sisters in the community, and also an underage girl, it said. Even though "no charges have been ever pressed against him", Father Donneaud adds “The Community of the Beatitudes is deeply ashamed of the failures of Ephraim, and expresses compassion and sorrow to the victims of the abuses. The new information about the gravely culpable acts committed by several of its members, in particular its founder, has led the community to move further ahead in the process of repentance and purification of its memory.” . The present Statutes of the Community were renewed ad experimentum on June 29, 2014, for 3 years, under the guidance and support of the Vatican Congregation for Institutes of Consecrated Life.

== Bibliography ==
- Les Naufragés de l'esprit. Des sectes dans l'Église catholique, T. Baffoy, A. Delestre, J-P Sauzet, Seuil editions, 1996
- Les communautés nouvelles - Nouveaux visages du catholicisme français, Olivier Landron, Le Cerf editions, 2004
- Les Pluies de l'arrière-saison, Brother Ephraïm, Fayard editions, 1986
