= Armour Landry =

Canadian photojournalist

- Born: February 9, 1905; Drummondville, Quebec, Canada
- Died: September 19, 1994 (aged 89); Montreal, Quebec, Canada
- Other name: Armor
- Occupations: Journalist, Photographer, Photojournalist

Armour Landry (9 February 1905 – 19 September 1994) was a Canadian-American journalist, photographer and photojournalist.

== Biography ==
Armour Landry was born on 9 February 1905 in Drummondville, Quebec, Canada. He was raised in Manchester, New Hampshire. He studied at Hevey School and Sainte-Marie College. While working, he studied public relations, journalism and history in Boston

After 25 years, Landry came back to Quebec; specifically, Trois-Rivières. There, he collaborated with Albert Tessier. He coedited the Pages trifluviennes with him and was the author of its first work, "Bribes d'histoires". Landry wrote a column in Le Bien Public for a few years under the pseudonym "Armor".

Landry was assistant secretary for the Comité des manifestations that gave Trois-Rivières many of its monuments. He founded the magazine Le flambeau. He founded the tourist office of Trois-Rivières and became its director. During this era, the office created the name Mauricie.

He was conscripted during World War II. He was assigned to a press relations department and stayed in Mexico in 1942 and 1944.

Landry had long been interested in photography. Back in Canada, he published multiple illustrated news reports about life in Quebec, the United States and France. When World War II finished, he became a career photographer. His photographs were shown in magazines and newspapers of Canadian and foreign origins. He took photographs in Europe, the United States and Latin America.

Landry travelled across France for the exposition "Au berceau de la Nouvelle-France". From 1942 to 1966, he published hundreds of illustrated articles in the sole supplement for La Patrie. He also worked on the iconographic research for multiple works, notably Robert Rumilly's One of his photographs was used for the verso of the 1969 Robert Charlebois album Québec Love.

He married Pierrette Dugal on 17 September 1945.

Thanks to him, stairs from the Hôtel-Dieu de La Flèche were bought, restored and then shown at the Museum of the Religious Hospitaliers of Saint-Joseph.

He published Une Amérique française with Donat Casanova in 1975. In 1985, some of his photographs were presented at the hall of the Ernest-Cormier building.

Armour Landry died in Montreal on 19 September 1994. By then, he had taken thousands of photographs over multiple decades.
