= Drummond–Bois-Francs =

Provincial electoral district in Quebec, Canada

Coordinates: 45.919°N 72.053°W

Quebec electoral district

Provincial electoral district
- Legislature: National Assembly of Quebec
MNA
Charles Page
Parti Québécois
- District created: 2011
- First contested: 2012
- Last contested: 2026

Demographics
- Electors (2012): 49,430
- Area (km²): 1,834.9
- Census division(s): Arthabaska (part), Drummond (part)
- Census subdivision(s): Drummondville (part), Chesterville, Ham-Nord, Kingsey Falls, Notre-Dame-de-Ham, Notre-Dame-du-Bon-Conseil (parish), Notre-Dame-du-Bon-Conseil (village), Saint-Albert, Sainte-Clotilde-de-Horton, Saint-Cyrille-de-Wendover, Sainte-Élizabeth-de-Warwick, Saint-Félix-de-Kingsey, Sainte-Hélène-de-Chester, Saint-Lucien, Saints-Martyrs-Canadiens, Saint-Rémi-de-Tingwick, Saint-Samuel, Sainte-Séraphine, Tingwick, Warwick

Drummond–Bois-Francs is a provincial electoral district in the Centre-du-Québec region of Quebec, Canada, that elects members to the National Assembly of Quebec. It notably includes parts of the city of Drummondville as well as Saint-Cyrille-de-Wendover, Warwick, Kingsey Falls, and Saint-Lucien.

It was created for the 2012 election from parts of the former Drummond and Richmond electoral districts.

== Members of the National Assembly ==
Legislature	Years	Member	Party
Riding created from Drummond and Richmond
40th	2012–2014	Sébastien Schneeberger	Coalition Avenir Québec
41st	2014–2018	Sébastien Schneeberger	Coalition Avenir Québec
42nd	2018–2022	Sébastien Schneeberger	Coalition Avenir Québec
43rd	2022–2026	Sébastien Schneeberger	Coalition Avenir Québec
44th	2026–Present	Charles Page	Parti Québécois

== Election results ==
2026 Quebec general election
** Preliminary results — Not yet official **
Party	Candidate	Votes	%	±%
Parti Québécois	Charles Page	11,409	30.67	+15.62
Conservative	Myriam Courtnoyer	10,943	29.41	+12.02
Coalition Avenir Québec	Sébastien Schneeberger	7,233	19.44	–32.30
Liberal	Colin Hendry	4,516	12.14	+8.13
Québec solidaire	Lila Houde	2,586	6.95	–3.70
Green	Marco Beauchesne	287	0.77	–0.24
Présence	Sylvain Audet	230	0.62	N/A
Total valid votes		37,204	98.09	+0.17
Total rejected ballots		725	1.91	–0.17
Turnout		37,929	70.75	+1.15
Electors on the lists		53,611		
Parti Québécois gain from Coalition Avenir Québec		Swing		+1.80
Source: Élections Québec

2022 Quebec general election
Party	Candidate	Votes	%	±%
Coalition Avenir Québec	Sébastien Schneeberger	18,747	51.64	-4.66
Conservative	Myriam Cournoyer	6,314	17.39	+15.29
Parti Québécois	Emrick Couture-Picard	5,462	15.05	+2.51
Québec solidaire	Tony Martel	3,866	10.65	-4.36
Liberal	Pierre Poirier	1,455	4.01	-9.01
Green	Marco Beauchesne	367	1.01	–
Équipe Autonomiste	Steve Therion	91	0.25	-0.05
Total valid votes		36,302	98.26	–
Total rejected ballots		641	1.74	-0.51
Turnout		36,943	69.60	+0.78
Electors on the lists		53,078	–	–
Coalition Avenir Québec hold		Swing		-9.97

2018 Quebec general election
Party	Candidate	Votes	%	±%
Coalition Avenir Québec	Sébastien Schneeberger	19,577	56.3	+16.38
Québec solidaire	Lannïck Dinard	5,221	15.01	+8.8
Liberal	Kevin Deland	4,527	13.02	-12.21
Parti Québécois	Diane Roy	4,360	12.54	-13.75
Conservative	Francois Picard	733	2.11	+1.27
Independent	Sylvain Marcoux	250	0.72	
Équipe Autonomiste	Steve Therion	106	0.3	
Total valid votes		34,774	97.76	
Total rejected ballots		798	2.24	
Turnout		35,572	68.82	
Eligible voters		51,691		
Coalition Avenir Québec hold		Swing		+3.79
Source(s) "Rapport des résultats officiels du scrutin". Élections Québec.

2014 Quebec general election
Party	Candidate	Votes	%
Coalition Avenir Québec	Sébastien Schneeberger	13,600	39.92
Parti Québécois	Daniel Lebel	8,958	26.29
Liberal	Isabelle Chabot	8,595	25.23
Québec solidaire	Francis Soulard	2,116	6.21
Parti nul	Frédéric Bélanger	361	1.06
Conservative	François Picard	285	0.84
Option nationale	Alexandre Phénix	155	0.45
Total valid votes		34,070	98.34
Total rejected ballots		575	1.66
Turnout		34,645	69.23
Electors on the lists		50,041	–

2012 Quebec general election
Party	Candidate	Votes	%	±%
Coalition Avenir Québec	Sébastien Schneeberger	13,879	37.59	+12.78
Parti Québécois	Annie Jean	11,374	30.80	-1.28
Liberal	Marie Désilets	8,230	22.29	-17.25
Québec solidaire	Francis Soulard	1,607	4.35	+0.86
Option nationale	Martin Allard	950	2.57	
Conservative	François Picard	421	1.14	
Independents	Pierre Hébert	355	0.96	
Unité Nationale	Robert Dufour	107	0.29	
Coalition Avenir Québec gain from Liberal		Swing		+14.53

^ Change is from redistributed results; CAQ change is from ADQ

== See also ==
- List of Quebec provincial electoral districts
- Canadian provincial electoral districts
