= John P. Webster =

Canadian bank executive

John Philip Webster is a Canadian bank executive with The Bank of Nova Scotia (Scotiabank), serving as President & CEO of the Scotia Mortgage Authority. He formerly served as the President & CEO of Maple Trust, who were acquired by Scotiabank in 2006.

== Life ==
Webster was born in Drummondville, Quebec, although he grew up in Perth, Ontario. He attended Wilfrid Laurier University, a member of the 1978 Yates Cup team, and went on to study law at McGill University, earning both a BCL and an LLB in 1983.

Webster is active in the Liberal Party, and was a key strategist for the Paul Martin leadership campaign, credited as one of three main Martin advisers to internally topple the Chrétien regime in 2003. He served as one of three National Campaign Co-Chairs in the 2004 Canadian federal election, as a chief strategist for Prime Minister Martin. Prior to supporting Martin, Webster served as campaign director for both former Prime Minister John Turner and former Ontario Premier David Peterson. Most recently, Webster was a supporter of former Ontario Premier Bob Rae's Liberal leadership bid.

Webster received his undergraduate diploma from Wilfrid Laurier University, and his BCL & LLB from McGill University.
