= Arthur Rajotte =

Canadian politician

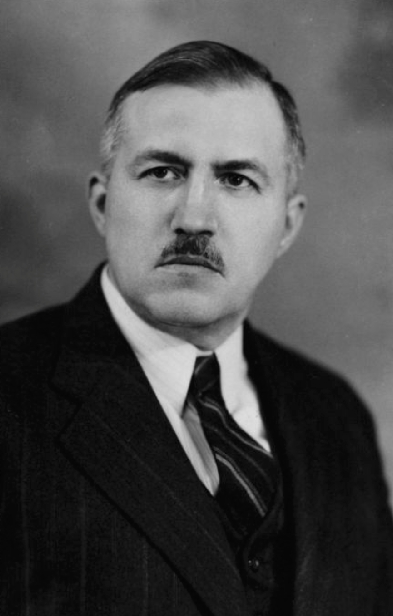

Member of the Legislative Assembly of Quebec for Drummond
- In office 1935–1936
- Preceded by: Hector Laferté
- Succeeded by: Joseph Marier
- In office 1939–1944
- Preceded by: Joseph Marier
- Succeeded by: Robert Bernard

Personal details
- Born: November 4, 1891 Lewiston, Maine
- Died: September 29, 1950 (aged 58) Drummondville, Quebec
- Party: Liberal

Arthur Rajotte (November 4, 1891 – September 29, 1950) was a Canadian provincial politician.

Born in Lewiston, Maine, Rajotte was mayor of Drummondville from 1938 to 1942. He was the member of the Legislative Assembly of Quebec for Drummond from 1935 to 1936 and from 1939 to 1944.
