= List of mayors of Drummondville =

This is a list of mayors of Drummondville, Quebec.

== List ==
- 1889 - 1897: Joseph-Éna Girouard
- 1898 - 1902: J. William Mitchell
- 1902 - 1903: J. A. Bousquet
- 1903 - 1905: Henri Girard
- 1905 - 1908: Napoléon Garceau
- 1908 - 1909: David Hébert
- 1909 - 1912: Napoléon Garceau
- 1912 - 1914: Ovide Brouillard
- 1914 - 1918: Alexandre Mercure
- 1918 - 1920: J. Ovila Montplaisir
- 1920 - 1924: Napoléon Garceau
- 1924 - 1936: Walter Moisan
- 1936 - 1938: Eugène Pelletier
- 1938 - 1942: Arthur Rajotte
- 1942 - 1948: Joseph Garon
- 1948 - 1950: Gaston Ringuet
- 1950 - 1954: Antoine Biron
- 1954 - 1955: Jean B. Michaud
- 1955 - 1966: Marcel Marier
- 1966 - 1983: Philippe Bernier
- 1983 - 1987: Serge Ménard
- 1987 - 2013: Francine Ruest-Jutras
- 2013 - 2020: Alexandre Cusson
- 2020 - 2021: Alain Carrier
- 2021 - 2025: Stéphanie Lacoste
- 2025 - present: Jean-François Houle
