= Joseph Peter Cooke =

Canadian politician

Joseph Peter Cooke (May 18, 1858 – July 28, 1913) was a lawyer and political figure in Quebec. He represented Drummond in the Legislative Assembly of Quebec from 1892 to 1897 as a Conservative.

He was born in Drummondville, Canada East, the son of John Valentine Cooke and Mary Anne Faulker, and was educated at the Collège Saint-François in Richmond and McGill University. In 1880, he married Helen Grace Burnett. Cooke was admitted to the Quebec bar in 1881 and practised in Drummondville and later Montreal. In 1899, he was named Queen's Counsel. Cooke was defeated when he ran for election in Montréal division no.4 as a Liberal in 1897. He was lieutenant-colonel in the Fusiliers du Prince-de-Galles. Cooke was registrar for West Montreal from 1907 until his death in Montreal in 1913 at the age of 55. He was buried in the Mount Royal Cemetery.
