= Frederick Heriot =

Canadian politician (1786–1843)

Frederick Heriot CB JP

Member of the Third Special Council of Lower Canada
- In office April 1840 – 10 February 1841
- Governor-General: Charles Poulett Thomson

Member of the Legislative Assembly for Lower Canada
- In office 7 November 1829 – 31 January 1833
- Constituency: Drummond

Personal details
- Born: 11 January 1786 Jersey, Channel Islands
- Died: 30 December 1843 (aged 57) Drummondville, Lower Canada
- Relations: Robert Nugent Watts (cousin)

Military service
- Allegiance: British Empire; Lower Canada
- Branch/service: British Army
- Years of service: 1801–1843
- Rank: Major general
- Unit: 49th Regiment of Foot; Canadian Voltigeurs (1813–1815)
- Battles/wars: War of 1812: Second Battle of Sacket's Harbor; Battle of Crysler's Farm; Lower Canada Rebellion

Frederick George Heriot CB JP (11 January 1786 – 30 December 1843) was a British army officer, who fought in the War of 1812 and subsequently became a landowner and administrator in Canada.

== Biography ==
Of mixed Scottish and Irish ancestry, he was born on the island of Jersey in the Channel Islands, the son of an army surgeon. He entered the army in 1801 as Ensign in the 49th Regiment of Foot (whose commanding officer was the then Lieutenant Colonel Isaac Brock). Heriot went with the 49th to Canada the following year, and served there for the remainder of his military career.

When war broke out with the United States, he was appointed second in command of the Canadian Voltigeurs with the acting rank of Major. He commanded a detachment of Voltigeurs at Kingston, Ontario during 1813 and was present at the Battle of Sackett's Harbor and the Battle of Crysler's Farm, where he played a prominent part.

The following year, he became an acting commanding officer with the rank of lieutenant-colonel of the Voltigeurs in 1814. He remained in this post until the end of the war.

After the war, he resigned from the army and instead became the Administrator for the settlement of discharged soldiers in the valley of the Saint-François River in Lower Canada, which would become Drummondville, Quebec. Heriot was named a Companion in the Order of the Bath in 1822. He was appointed aide-de-camp to the governor in 1826. He was elected Member of the Legislative Assembly for the community in 1829 and 1830, before resigning in 1833. He also served as a member of the Special Council that governed Lower Canada after the Lower Canada Rebellion. He was promoted to the rank of Major General in the militia in 1841.

He died at Comfort Hall in Drummondville on 30 December 1843 from typhoid fever, aged 57.
