= Saint-Nicéphore, Quebec =

Coordinates: 45°49′47.6″N 72°25′7″W

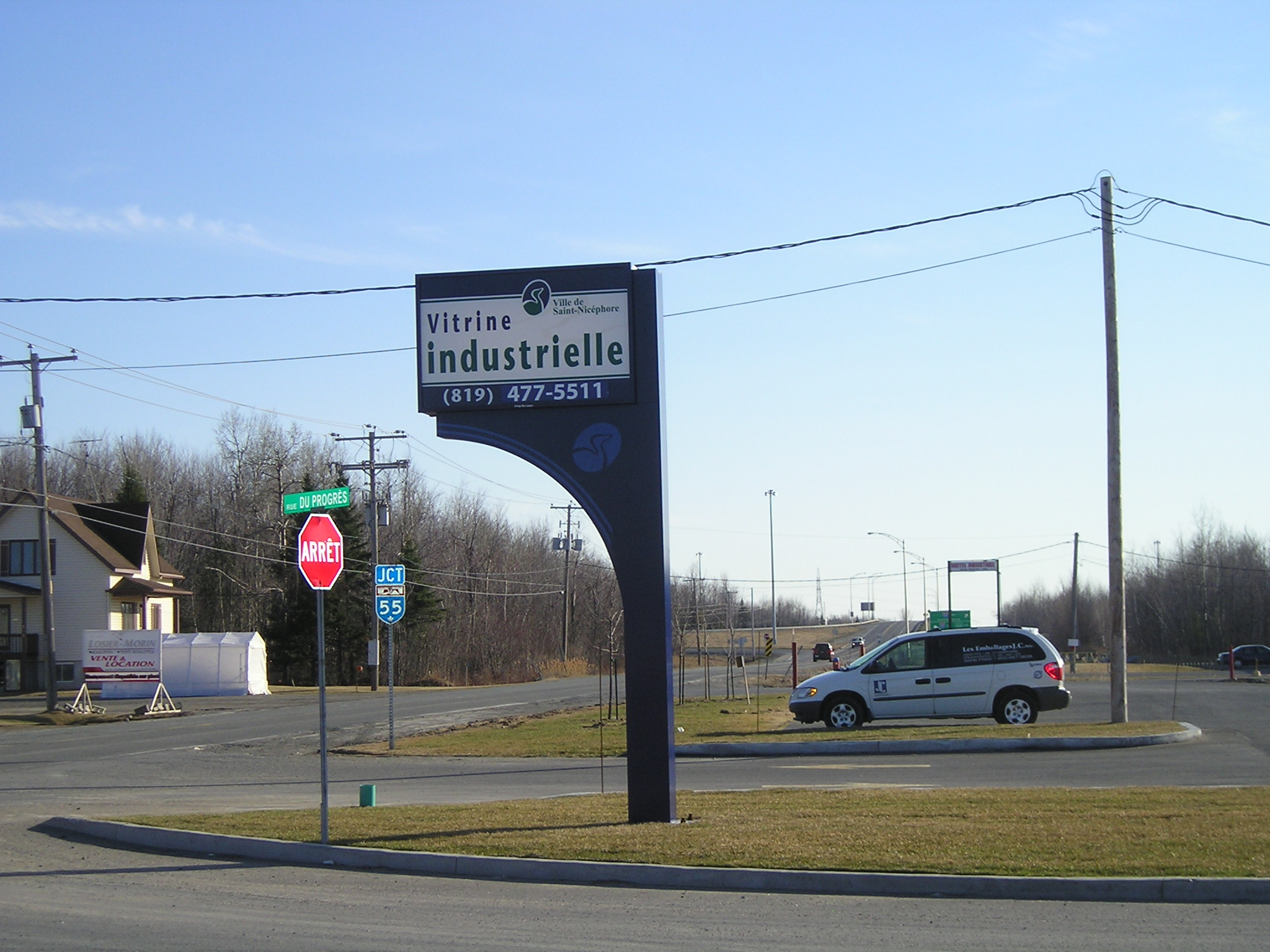
Industrial park in St-Nicephore

Saint-Nicéphore (French pronunciation: [sɛ̃ nisefɔʁ]) was a former city that has become a sector of Drummondville in the Centre-du-Québec region of Quebec, Canada, located east of Montreal on the Saint-François River. Saint-Nicéphore was once the seat of the Drummond Regional County Municipality.

On July 7, 2004, Saint-Nicéphore, Saint-Charles-de-Drummond and Saint-Joachim-de-Courval merged into Drummondville.

In 2004, its population was approximately 10,500.
