= Cégep Drummond =

Public college in Drummondville, Quebec

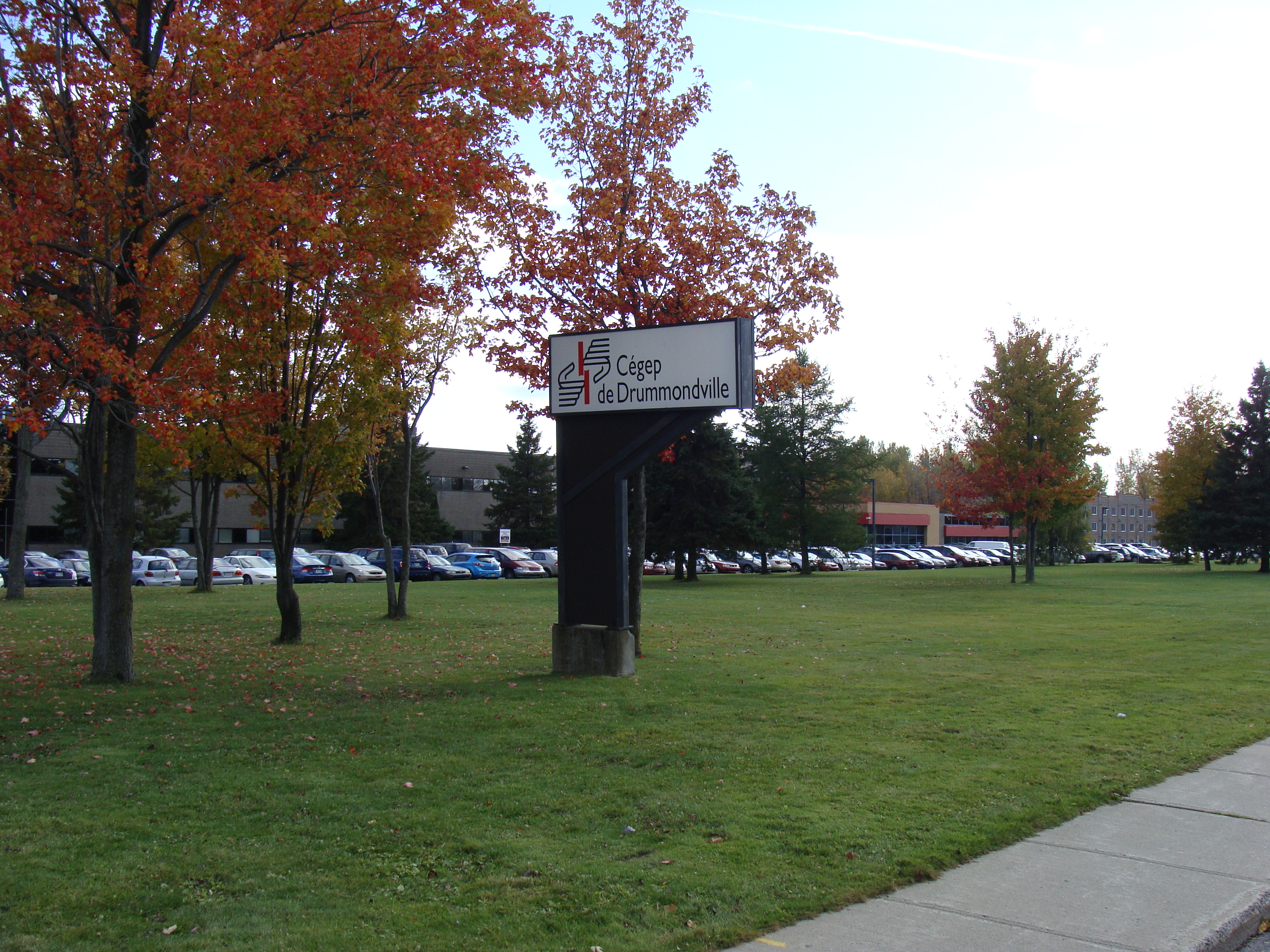
- Type: Public CEGEP
- Established: April 15, 1968
- Affiliations: non-denominational
- Academic affiliations: ACCC
- Chancellor: Brigitte Bourdages
- Undergraduates: Pre-university students; technical
- Location: 960, rue Saint-Georges Drummondville, Quebec, Canada J2C 6A2; 45°52′28.39″N 72°30′24.29″W
- Campus: Urban/suburban
- Colours: Red and black
- Nickname: Voltigeurs
- Sporting affiliations: CCAA, QSSF, AUCC
- Website: www.cegepdrummond.ca

Cégep Drummond is a CEGEP in Drummondville, Quebec, Canada.

== Programs ==
The Cégep Drummond offers types of programs: pre-university and technical. The pre-university programs, which take two years to complete, cover the subject matters which roughly correspond to the additional year of high school given elsewhere in Canada in preparation for a chosen field in university. The technical programs, which take three years to complete, apply to students who wish to pursue a skill trade. In addition, continuing education and services to businesses are provided.

  - Music, Dance, Arts,
  - Technology, Office automation, Accounting and management,
  - Electronics, Estimation and evaluation of buildings,
  - Management, Engineering mechanical, Data-processing,
  - transportation logistics, plant maintenance and nursing.

== History ==
The college traces its origins to the merger of several institutions, which became public in 1967 when the Quebec system of CEGEPs was created. On April 15, 1968, les Corporations de l'Externat Classique Saint-Raphaël et du Collège Marie-de-la-Présentation partnered for the school year 1968–1969. Over time, other institutions in Drummondville joined in the partnership: L'école des Infirmières, l'Institut familial Sainte-Marie et le cours technique de l'École de Métiers. The Cégep de Drummondville was founded in 1968 with 500 students in the first year. It was affiliated with the Cégep of Saint-Hyacinthe in 1970. In 1972, a partnership of CEGEPS from Drummondville, Saint-Hyacinthe and Sorel formed le Collège régional Bourgchemin.

In 1980, the government of Quebec granted a charter of Cégep de Drummondville, and the CEGEP opened its doors on May 13, 1980 – 1981, with 1171 students in pre-university teaching and 475 in continuing education. Since 1968, Cégep de Drummondville has been housed in various temporary buildings. In 1982, the Cégep moved into its new facility at 960, rue Saint-Georges. In January 1986, Cégep took possession of phase II of its building. In 1990, the CEGEP was enlarged to accommodate 1800 students. The maximum number of students (nearly 2000) was in 1995–1996. In 2006, Cégep de Drummondville counted 1900 students with pre-university teaching and nearly 200 in continuing education.

== Gallery ==
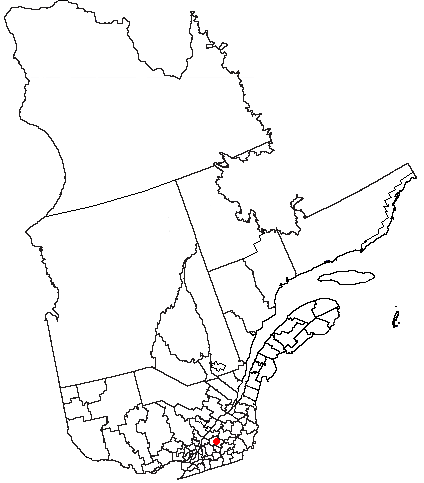
Drummondville

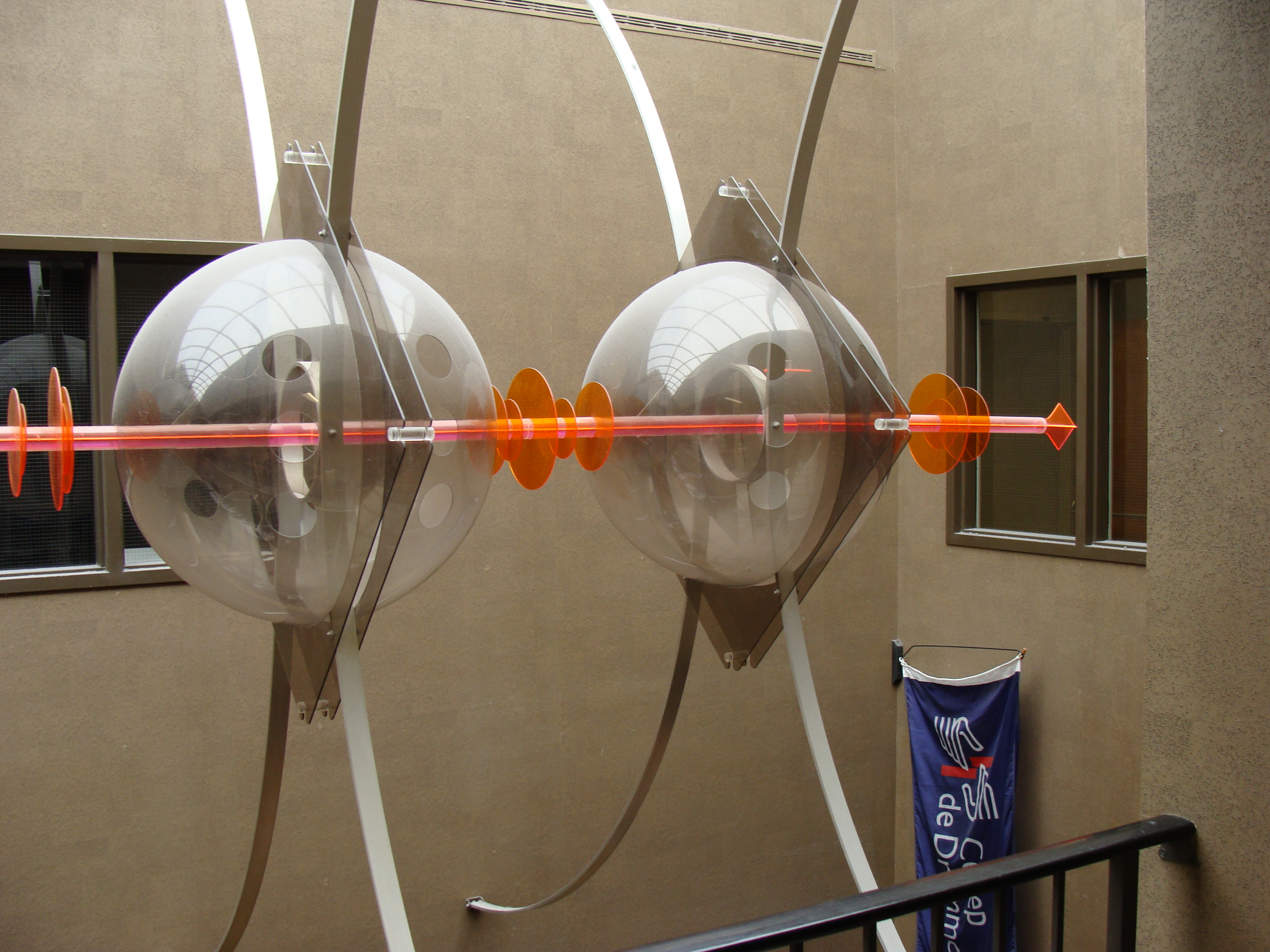
Cégep de Drummondville

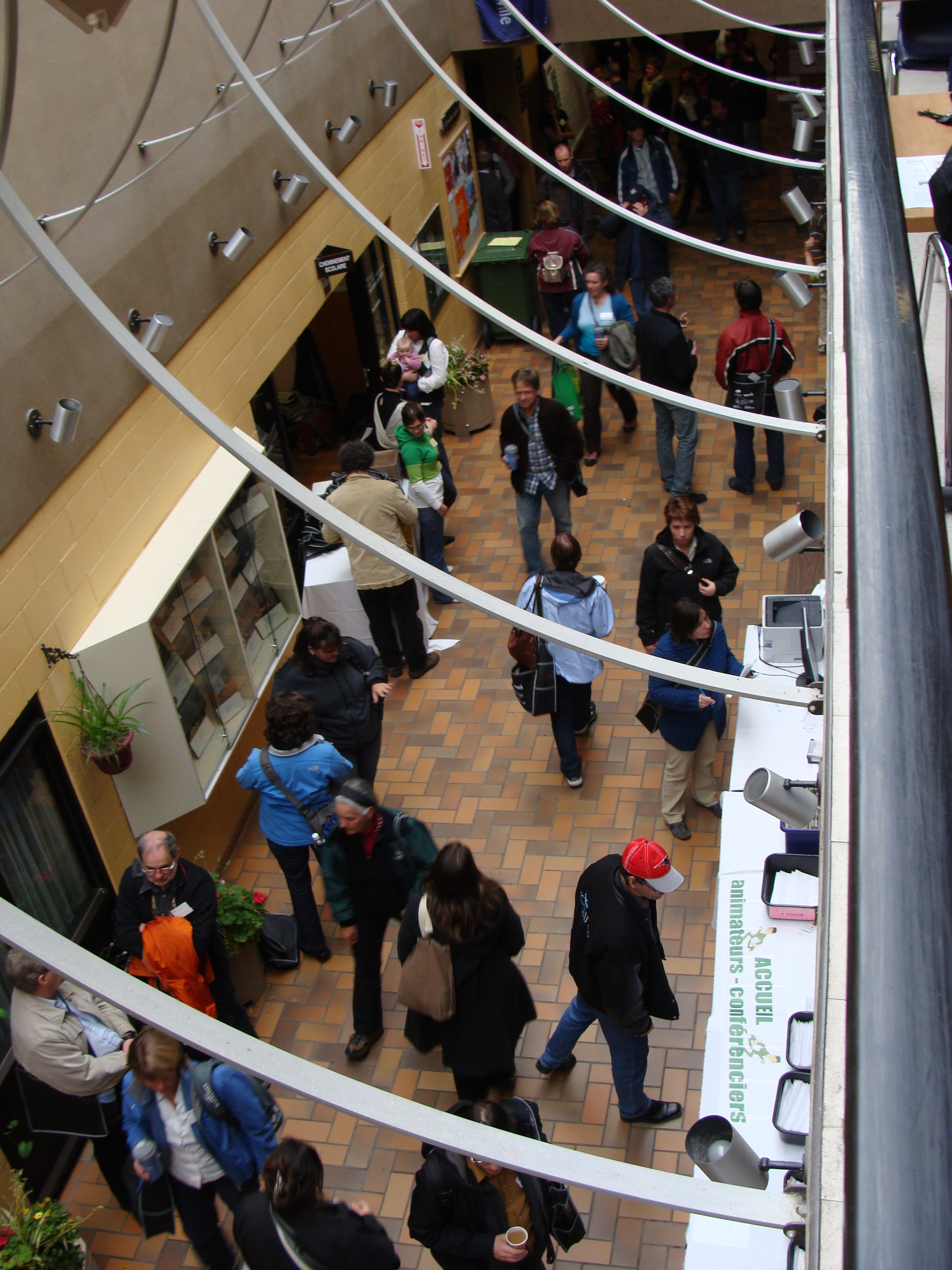
Cegep de Drummondville

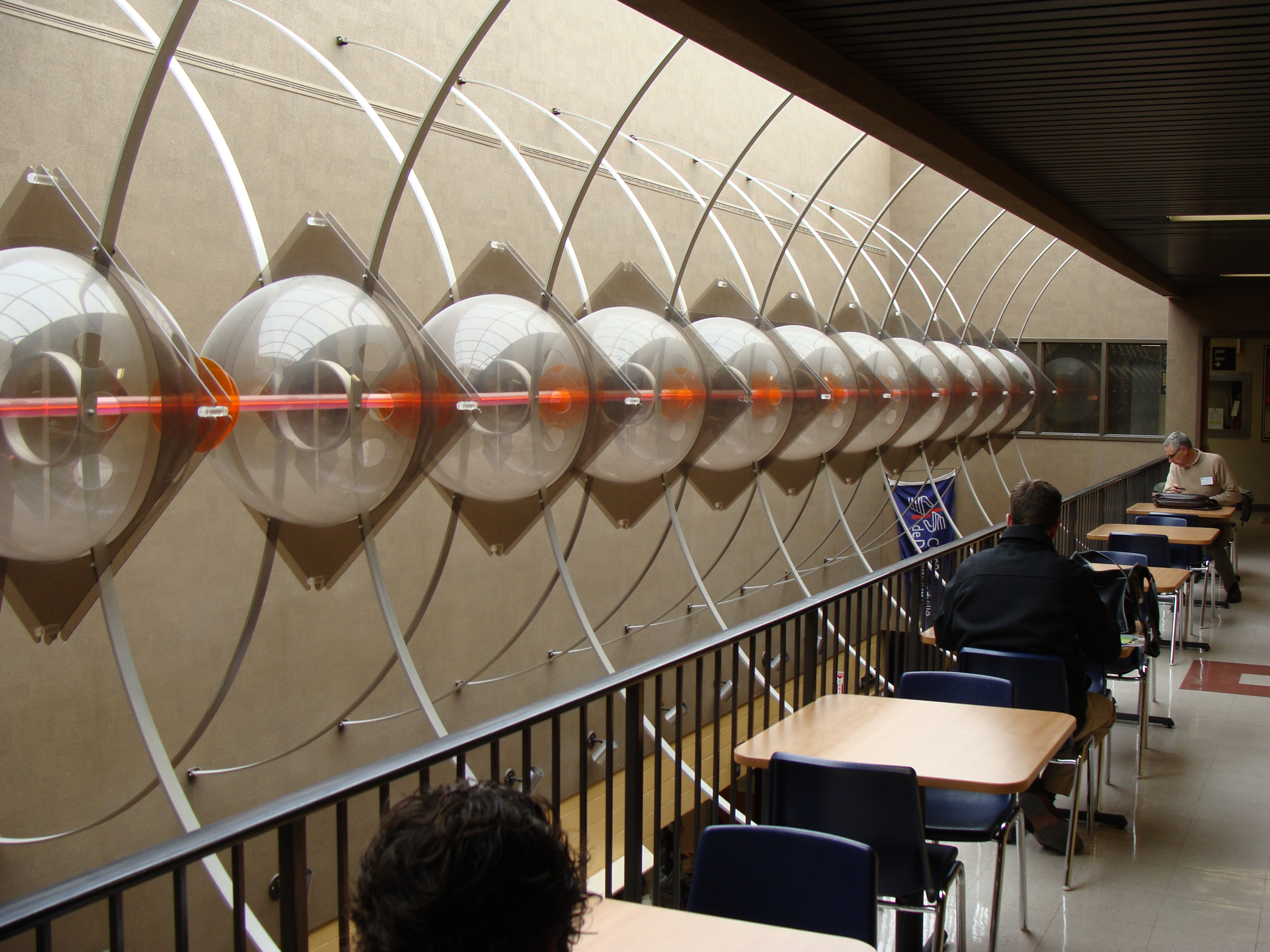
Cegep de Drummondville

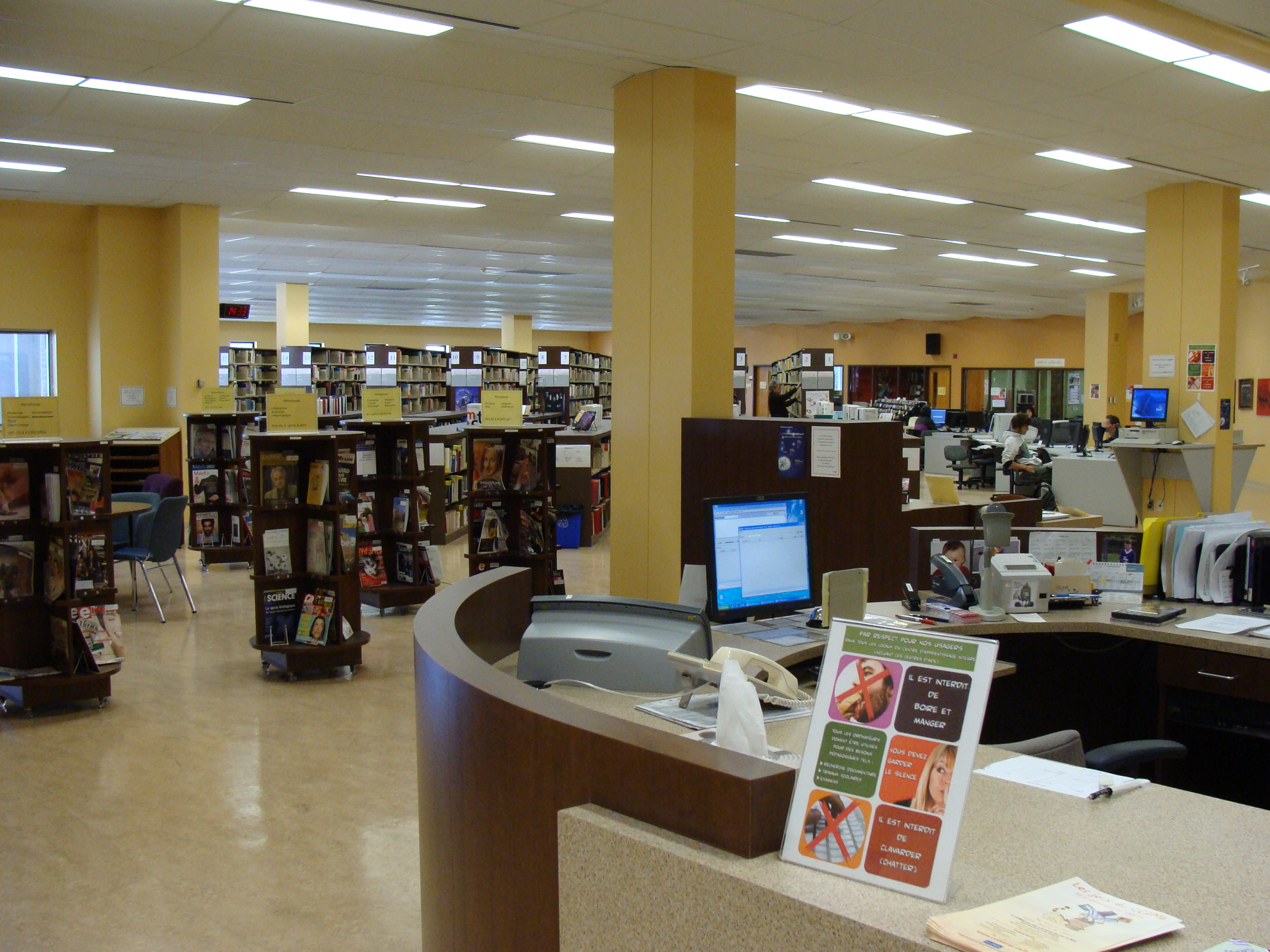
Cégep de Drummondville library

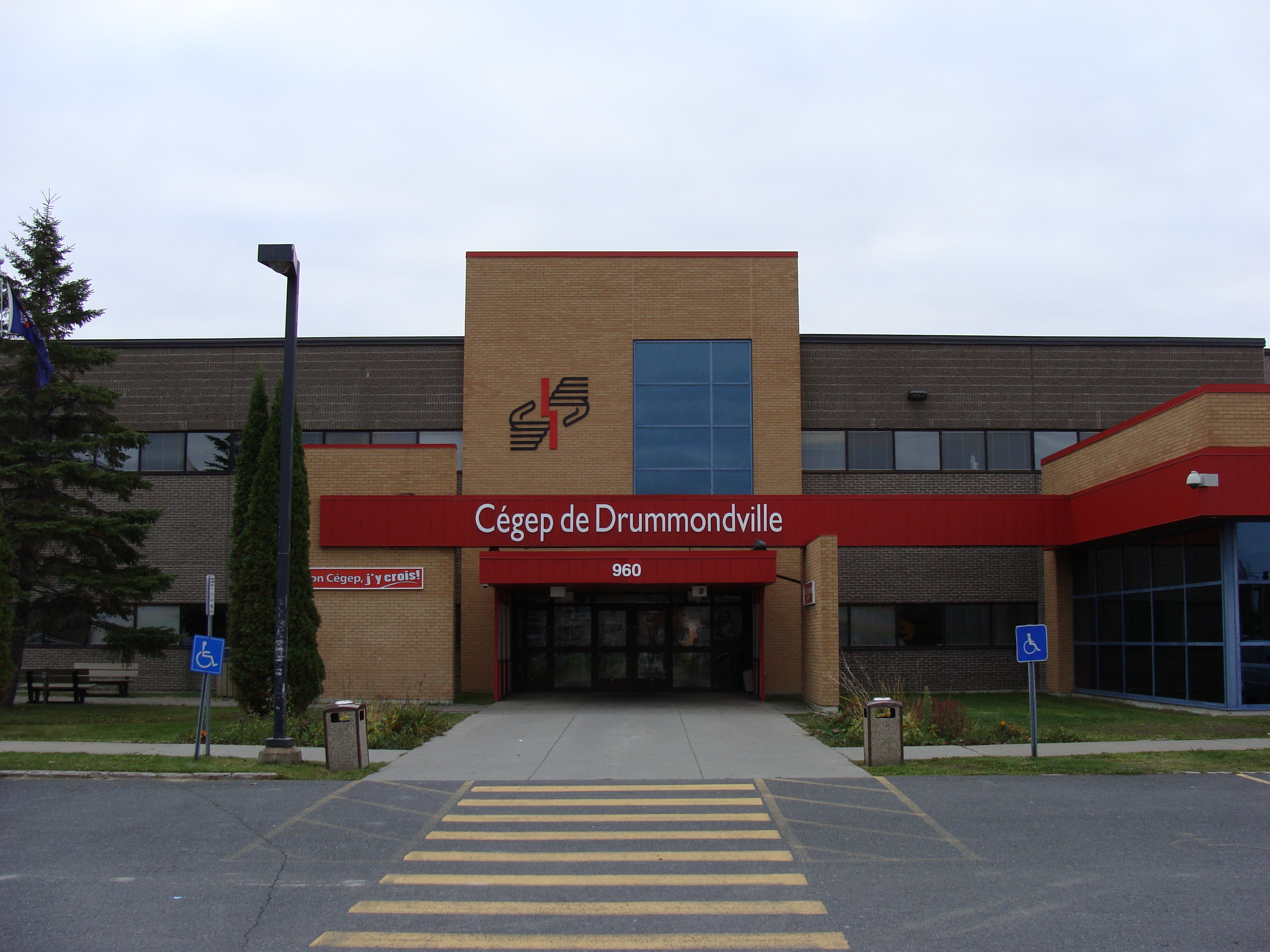
Cegep de Drummondville

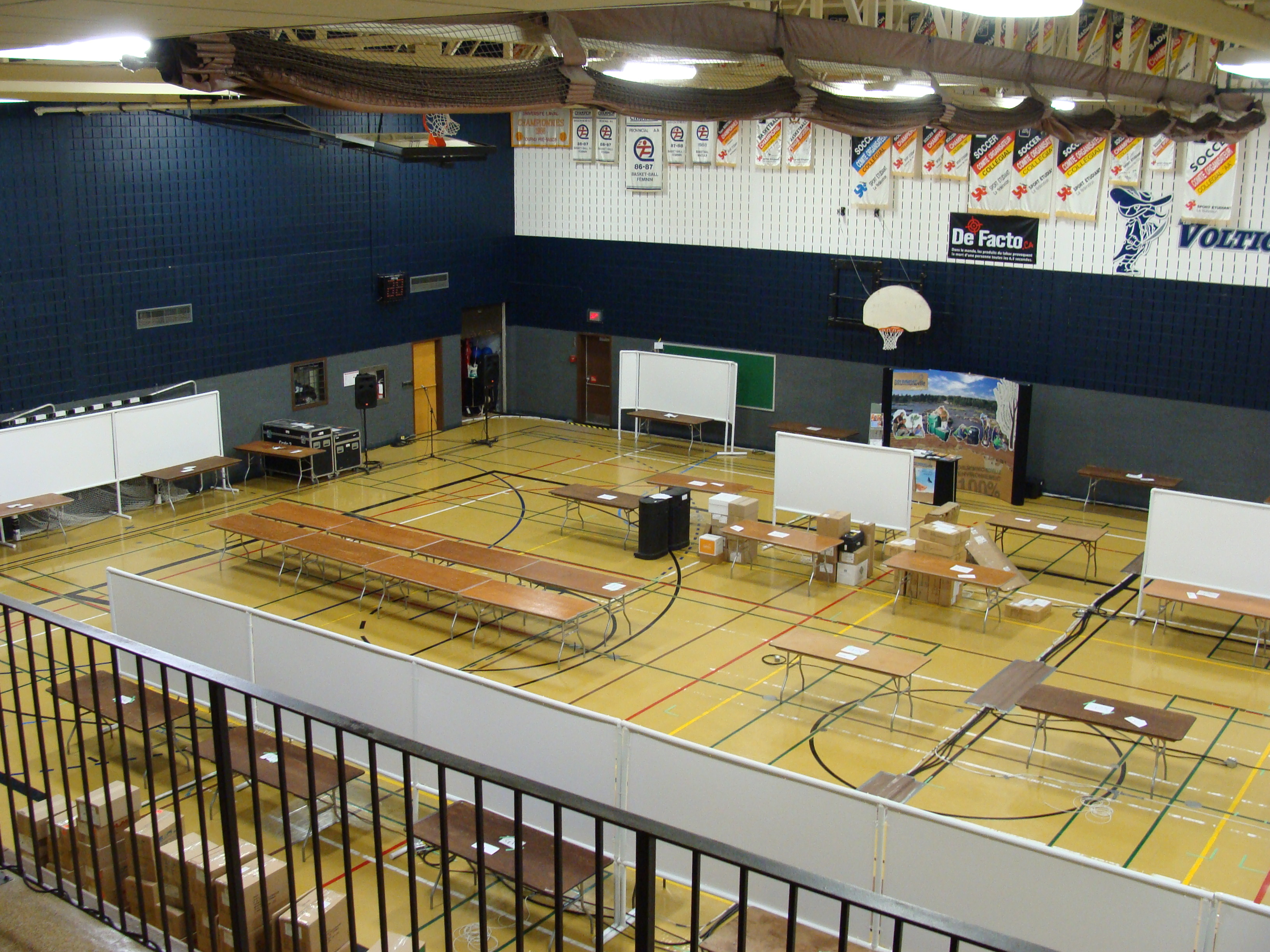
Cegep de Drummondville gym

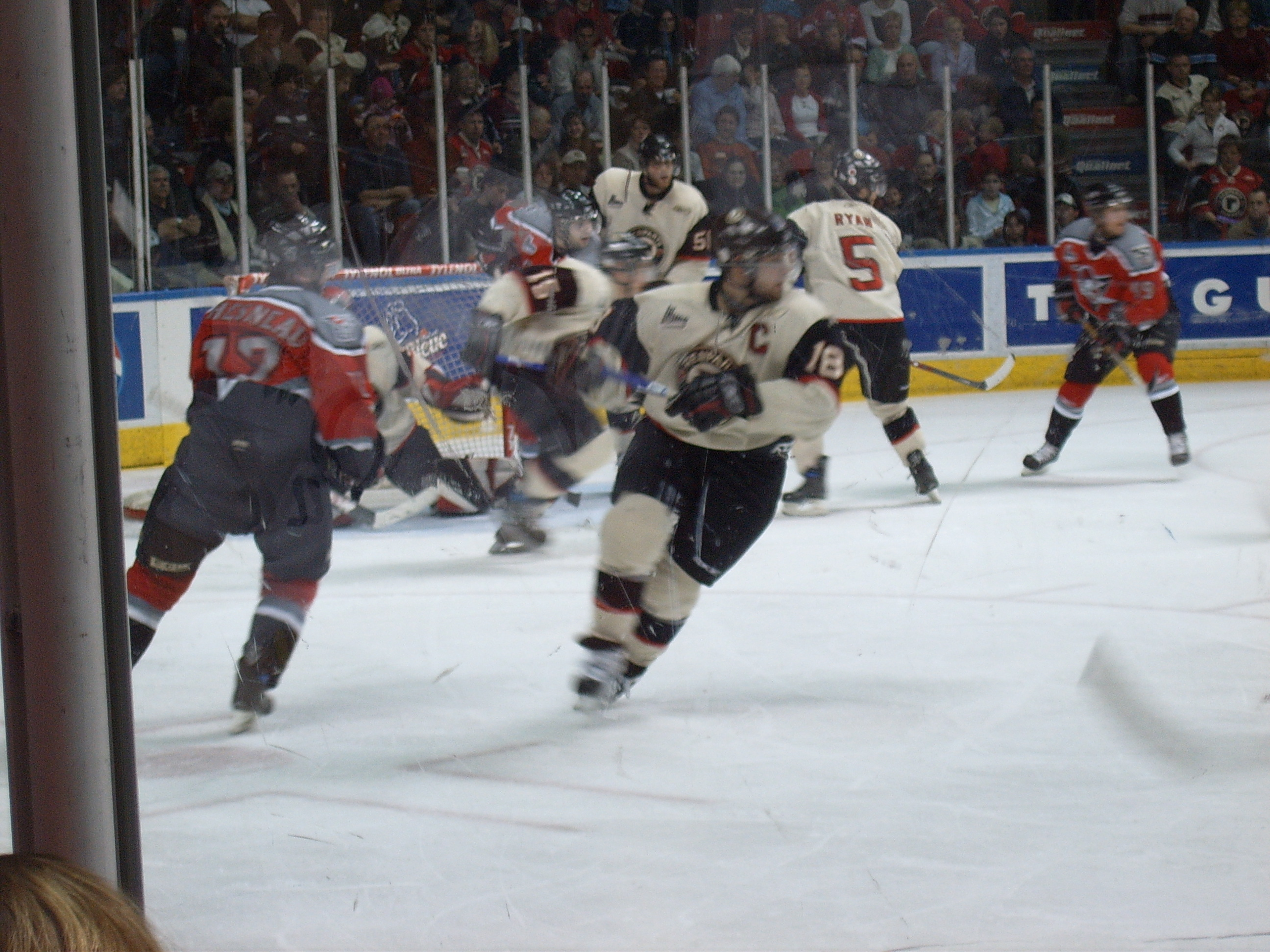
Voltigeurs

== See also ==
- List of colleges in Quebec
- Higher education in Quebec

== Elevators ==
La Cie F.-X. Drolet (Ascenseurs Drolet Inc.)
