= Saint-Germain-de-Grantham =

- Municipality
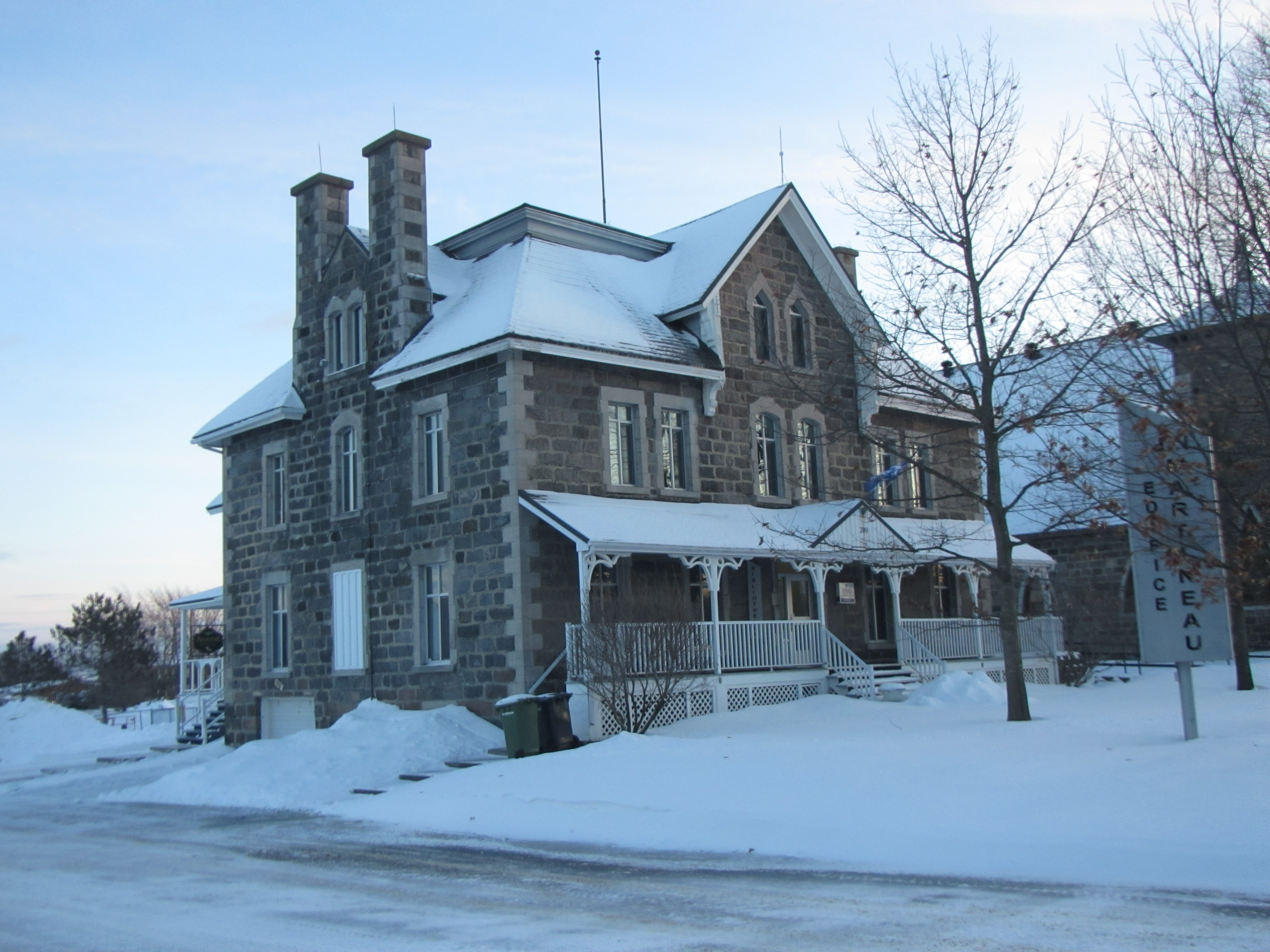

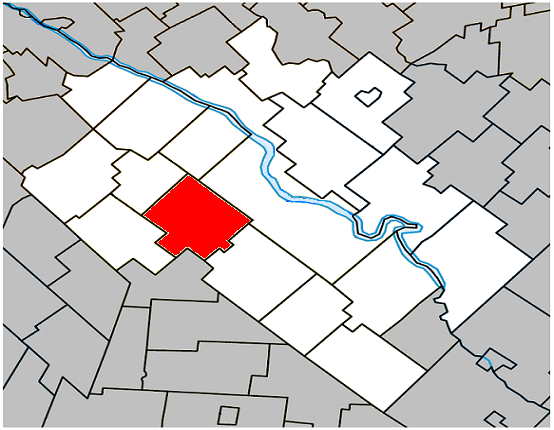
- Location within Drummond RCM.

- Location in southern Quebec.
- Coordinates: 45°50′N 72°34′W
- Country: Canada
- Province: Quebec
- Region: Centre-du-Québec
- RCM: Drummond
- Constituted: February 22, 1995

Government
  - Mayor: Nathacha Tessier
  - Federal riding: Drummond
  - Prov. riding: Marie-Lacoste-Gérin-Lajoie

Area
  - Total: 87.70 km^{2} (33.86 sq mi)
  - Land: 87.47 km^{2} (33.77 sq mi)

Population (2021)
  - Total: 4,922
  - Density: 56.3/km^{2} (146/sq mi)
  - Pop 2016-2021: ▲0.1%
  - Dwellings: 2,062
- Time zone: UTC−5 (EST)
  - Summer (DST): UTC−4 (EDT)
- Postal code(s): J0C 1K0
- Area code: 819
- Highways A-20 (TCH): R-122; R-239
- Website: www.st-germain.info

Saint-Germain-de-Grantham (French pronunciation: [sɛ̃ ʒɛʁmɛ̃ də ɡʁɑ̃tɔm]) is a municipality in the Centre-du-Québec region of Quebec. The population as of the Canada 2021 Census was 4,922.

Saint-Germain-de-Grantham was the birthplace of Marie Rose Ferron.

== Demographics ==
=== Population ===
Population trend:

Census	Population	Change (%)
2021	4,922	▲0.1%
2016	4,917	▲8.0%
2011	4,551	▲14.0%
2006	3,993	▲9.1%
2001	3,661	▲4.3%
1996	3,509	N/A

=== Language ===
Mother tongue language (2021)

Language	Population	Pct (%)
French only	4,765	96.8%
English only	50	1.0%
Both English and French	25	0.5%
Other languages	70	1.4%

== Infrastructure ==
Saint-Germain-de-Grantham's main transportation link is Autoroute 20 which travels through most of Québec on the southern side of the St. Lawrence River.

== See also ==
- List of municipalities in Quebec
