= Drummondville =

- City
- Ville de Drummondville
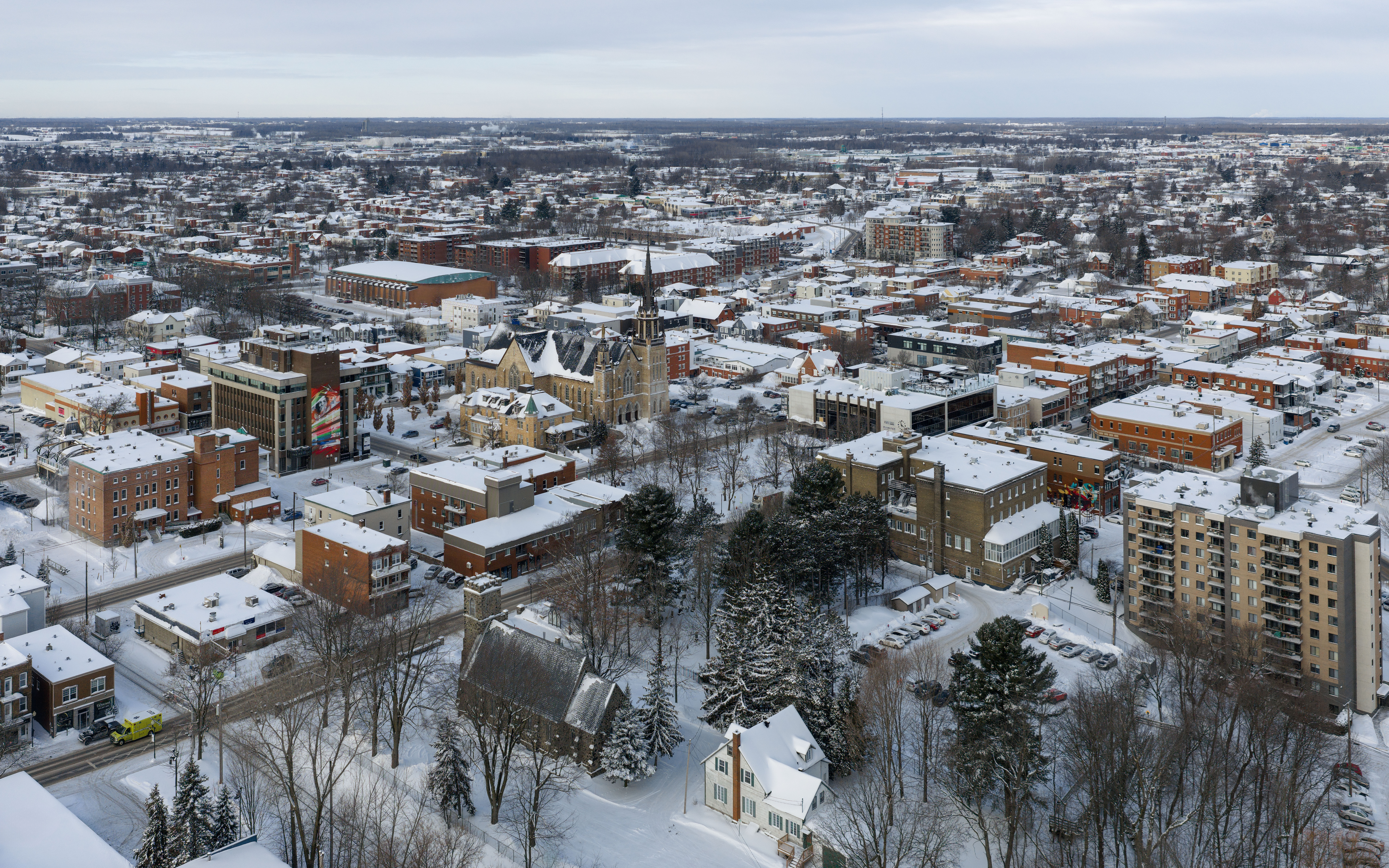
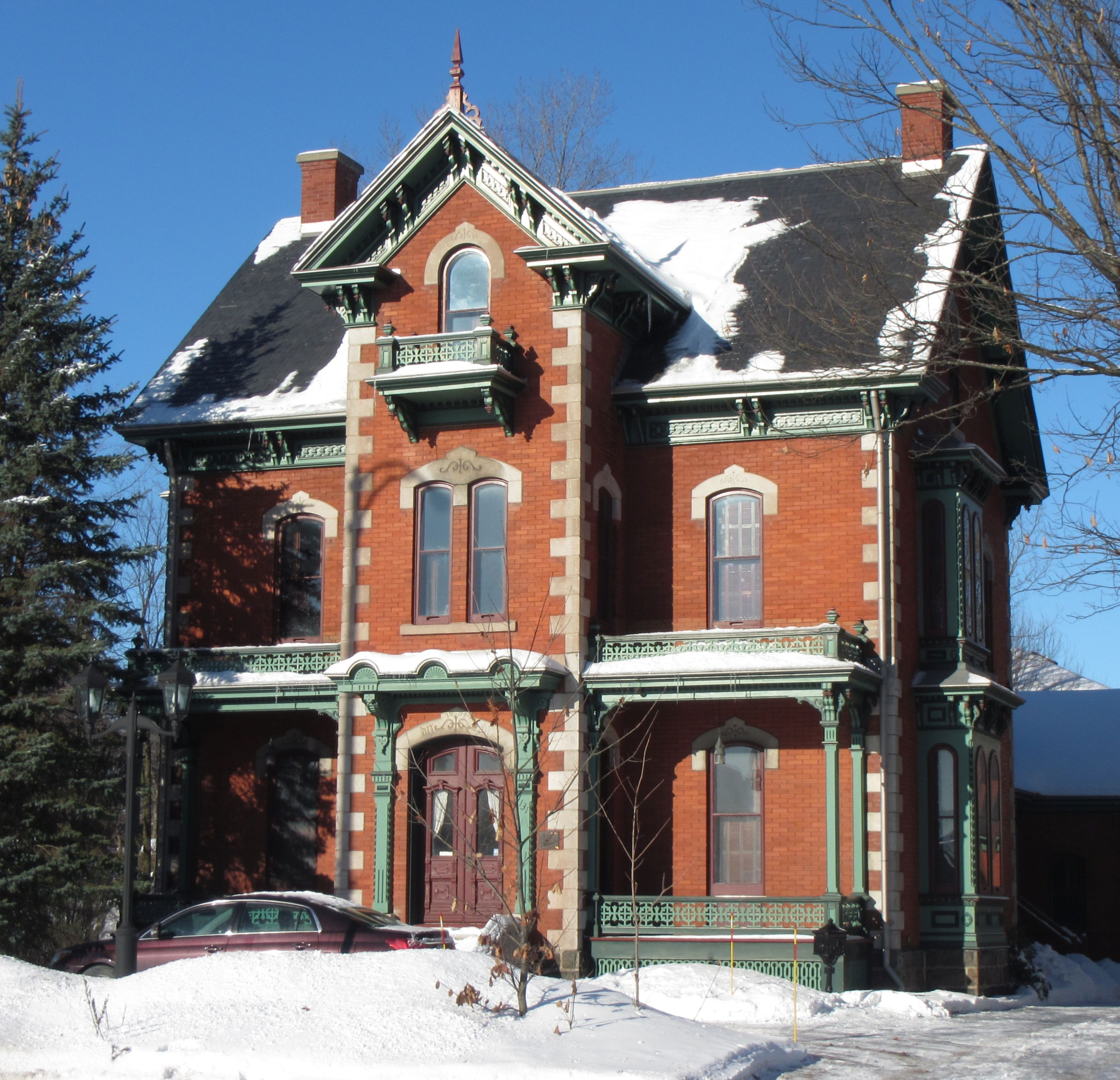
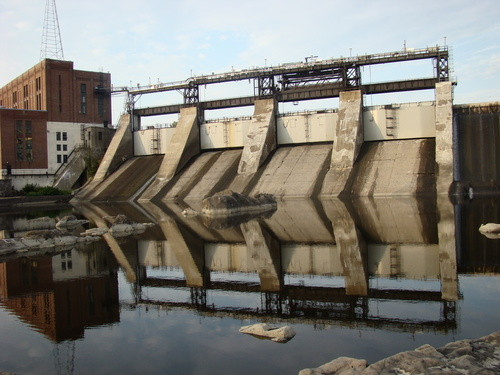
- Centre-ville William Mitchell House Hemmings Falls

- Coat of arms

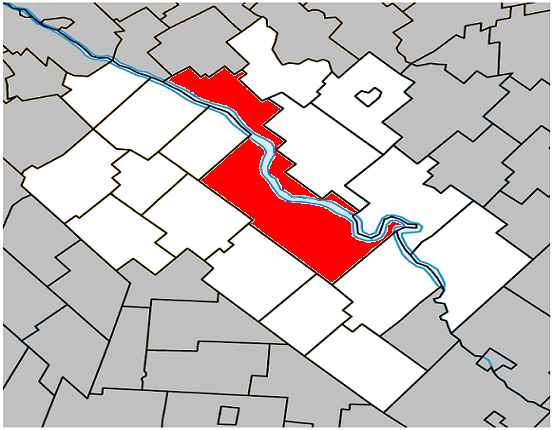
- Location within Drummond RCM

- Location in Quebec
- Coordinates: 45°53′N 72°29′W
- Country: Canada
- Province: Quebec
- Region: Centre-du-Québec
- RCM: Drummond
- Constituted: 7 July 2004

Government
  - Type: Drummondville City Council
  - Mayor: Jean-François Houle
  - Federal riding: Drummond
  - Prov. riding: Drummond–Bois-Francs and Marie-Lacoste-Gérin-Lajoie

Area
  - City: 260.10 km^{2} (100.43 sq mi)
  - Land: 246.85 km^{2} (95.31 sq mi)
  - Urban: 52.3 km^{2} (20.2 sq mi)
  - Metro: 803.81 km^{2} (310.35 sq mi)
- Elevation: 365 m (1,198 ft)

Population (2021)
  - City: 79,258
  - Density: 1,315.4/km^{2} (3,407/sq mi)
  - Urban: 72,089
  - Urban density: 1,378.4/km^{2} (3,570/sq mi)
  - Metro: 96,118
  - Metro density: 94.5/km^{2} (245/sq mi)
  - Pop 2011-2016: ▲5.0%
  - Dwellings: 33,812
- Time zone: UTC−5 (EST)
  - Summer (DST): UTC−4 (EDT)
- Postal code(s): J2A-J2E
- Area code: 819
- Website: www.drummondville.ca

Drummondville (Canadian French: [dʁɔmɔndvil]) is a city in the Centre-du-Québec region of Quebec, Canada, located east of Montreal on the Saint-François River. The population as of the Canada 2021 Census was 79,258. The mayor of Drummondville is Jean-François Houle.

Drummondville is the seat of Drummond Regional County Municipality and the judicial district of Drummond.

== History ==
Drummondville was founded in June 1815 by Lieutenant-Colonel Frederick Heriot. The purpose of the town was to provide a home for British soldiers in the War of 1812, and to guard the Saint-François (St Francis) River against American attacks. The town was named after Sir Gordon Drummond, the Lieutenant Governor of Upper Canada between 1813 and 1816.

The construction of the Hemmings Falls hydro-electric dam in 1920 brought a new wave of industrial growth to the Drummondville area. Several outlying municipalities have been amalgamated into Drummondville since the 1950s:

- 1955: Saint-Joseph de Grantham, Saint-Jean-Baptiste
- 1966: Drummondville-Ouest
- 1982: Drummondville-Sud
- 1993: Grantham
- 2004: Saint-Nicéphore, Saint-Charles-de-Drummond, Saint-Joachim-de-Courval

== Demographics ==
In the 2021 Census of Population conducted by Statistics Canada, Drummondville had a population of 79,258 living in 36,727 of its 37,931 total private dwellings, a change of 5.1% from its 2016 population of 75,423. With a land area of 247.11 km^{2} (95.41 sq mi), it had a population density of 320.7/km^{2} (830.7/sq mi) in 2021.

Historical population
Year	Pop.	±%
1881	900	—
1891	1,955	+117.2%
1901	1,450	−25.8%
1911	1,725	+19.0%
1921	2,852	+65.3%
1931	6,809	+138.7%
1941	10,555	+55.0%
1951	14,341	+35.9%
1961	27,909	+94.6%
1971	31,813	+14.0%
1981	26,975	−15.2%
1991	35,462	+31.5%
1996	44,882	+26.6%
2001	46,599	+3.8%
2006	67,392	+44.6%
2011	71,852	+6.6%
2016	75,423	+5.0%
2021	79,258	+5.1%
*Note that historical populations are affected by amalgamations in 1936, 1938, 1955, 1966, 1982, 1993 and 2004.

=== Ethnicity ===
In 2021, Drummondville was 92.7% White/European, 5.6% visible minorities and 1.7% Indigenous. The largest visible minority groups were Black (2.1%), Latin American (1.5%) and Arab (1.3%).

Panethnic groups in the City of Drummondville (2001−2021)
Panethnic group	2021		2016		2011		2006		2001	
Panethnic group	Pop.	%	Pop.	%	Pop.	%	Pop.	%	Pop.	%
European (Note: Statistic includes all persons that did not make up part of a visible minority or an indigenous identity.)	70,855	92.7%	69,330	95.8%	66,980	96.61%	63,780	97.04%	44,585	98.96%
African	1,585	2.07%	615	0.85%	385	0.56%	235	0.36%	90	0.2%
Indigenous	1,330	1.74%	830	1.15%	580	0.84%	340	0.52%	155	0.34%
Latin American	1,145	1.5%	665	0.92%	765	1.1%	1,085	1.65%	90	0.2%
Middle Eastern (Note: Statistic includes total responses of "West Asian" and "Arab" under visible minority section on census.)	1,005	1.31%	430	0.59%	260	0.38%	100	0.15%	75	0.17%
Southeast Asian (Note: Statistic includes total responses of "Filipino" and "Southeast Asian" under visible minority section on census.)	235	0.31%	160	0.22%	125	0.18%	85	0.13%	35	0.08%
East Asian (Note: Statistic includes total responses of "Chinese", "Korean", and "Japanese" under visible minority section on census.)	170	0.22%	265	0.37%	160	0.23%	80	0.12%	30	0.07%
South Asian	60	0.08%	20	0.03%	25	0.04%	10	0.02%	0	0%
Other/multiracial (Note: Statistic includes total responses of "Visible minority, n.i.e." and "Multiple visible minorities" under visible minority section on census.)	55	0.07%	65	0.09%	0	0%	15	0.02%	10	0.02%
Total responses	76,435	96.44%	72,370	95.95%	69,330	96.49%	65,725	97.53%	45,055	96.69%
Total population	79,258	100%	75,423	100%	71,852	100%	67,392	100%	46,599	100%
Note: Totals greater than 100% due to multiple origin responses

=== Language ===
French was the mother tongue of 93.8% of the population. The next most common first languages were Spanish (1.4%), English (1.1%), and Arabic (0.9%). 0.7% of residents listed both French and English as mother tongues, while 0.4% listed both French and a non-official language.

Mother tongue language (2021)
Language	Population	Pct (%)
French only	73,260	93.8%
English only	890	1.1%
Both English and French	585	0.7%
Other languages	2,890	3.7%

=== Religion ===
71.9% of residents were Christian in 2021, down from 90.8% in 2011. 64.4% were Catholic, 5.6% were Christian n.o.s, 0.8% were Protestant, and 1.0% belonged to other Christian denominations or Christian-related traditions. 26.0% of the population was non-religious or secular, up from 8.4% in 2011. Other religions and spiritual traditions accounted for 2.0% of the population, up from 0.8% in 2011. The largest non-Christian religion was Islam (1.7%).

== Attractions and culture ==
Drummondville markets itself as Quebec's Capital of Expression and Traditions, with attractions focusing on culture, both past and present. The main attractions are the Village Québécois d'Antan.

Since 2008 Drummondville has hosted Festival de la Poutine, towards the end of August; during three days people are invited to attend concerts there, and to savour several kinds of poutine, a Canadian dish of provincial origin.

From 1982 to 2017, Drummondville was home to the Mondial des Cultures, one of the largest folk dance festivals in the world.

Founded in 2017, Drummondville has also a huge amusement fun park named Laser Force which offers laser tag, indoor mini golf, virtual reality, indoor climbing and arcades. This 18000 square feet facility is located inside Swift Galey.

== Climate ==
Drummondville has a humid continental climate (Dfb) with warm, rainy summers and cold, snowy winters.

Climate data for Drummondville (1991−2020 normals, extremes 1913–present)
Month	Jan	Feb	Mar	Apr	May	Jun	Jul	Aug	Sep	Oct	Nov	Dec	Year
Record high °C (°F)	16.0 (60.8)	16.0 (60.8)	25.0 (77.0)	30.5 (86.9)	35.7 (96.3)	35.0 (95.0)	36.7 (98.1)	36.1 (97.0)	34.0 (93.2)	28.9 (84.0)	23.3 (73.9)	20.6 (69.1)	36.7 (98.1)
Mean daily maximum °C (°F)	−5.2 (22.6)	−3.2 (26.2)	2.3 (36.1)	10.7 (51.3)	19.1 (66.4)	23.8 (74.8)	26.0 (78.8)	25.1 (77.2)	20.7 (69.3)	13.2 (55.8)	5.9 (42.6)	−1.4 (29.5)	11.4 (52.5)
Daily mean °C (°F)	−9.7 (14.5)	−8.0 (17.6)	−2.4 (27.7)	5.9 (42.6)	13.4 (56.1)	18.8 (65.8)	21.1 (70.0)	20.1 (68.2)	15.7 (60.3)	9.0 (48.2)	2.2 (36.0)	−5.2 (22.6)	6.7 (44.1)
Mean daily minimum °C (°F)	−14.2 (6.4)	−12.8 (9.0)	−7.2 (19.0)	0.9 (33.6)	8.0 (46.4)	13.6 (56.5)	16.2 (61.2)	15.2 (59.4)	10.9 (51.6)	4.7 (40.5)	−1.5 (29.3)	−8.8 (16.2)	2.1 (35.8)
Record low °C (°F)	−41.7 (−43.1)	−40.6 (−41.1)	−35 (−31)	−20.6 (−5.1)	−12.2 (10.0)	−1.7 (28.9)	1.7 (35.1)	1.0 (33.8)	−6.1 (21.0)	−12.8 (9.0)	−25 (−13)	−40 (−40)	−41.7 (−43.1)
Average precipitation mm (inches)	89.7 (3.53)	65.7 (2.59)	66.4 (2.61)	78.7 (3.10)	90.7 (3.57)	102.1 (4.02)	109.3 (4.30)	98.8 (3.89)	93.8 (3.69)	100.0 (3.94)	80.0 (3.15)	94.8 (3.73)	1,070 (42.13)
Average rainfall mm (inches)	25.8 (1.02)	10.1 (0.40)	26.6 (1.05)	69.7 (2.74)	90.3 (3.56)	102.1 (4.02)	109.3 (4.30)	98.8 (3.89)	93.8 (3.69)	98.4 (3.87)	65.6 (2.58)	37.7 (1.48)	828.3 (32.61)
Average snowfall cm (inches)	57.3 (22.6)	49.5 (19.5)	37.7 (14.8)	9.2 (3.6)	0.3 (0.1)	0.0 (0.0)	0.0 (0.0)	0.0 (0.0)	0.0 (0.0)	1.2 (0.5)	13.6 (5.4)	60.1 (23.7)	228.8 (90.1)
Average precipitation days (≥ 0.2 mm)	15.1	12.0	11.9	12.5	13.3	14.5	14.3	12.1	13.1	13.7	14.0	15.5	161.9
Average rainy days (≥ 0.2 mm)	3.0	1.8	5.7	11.4	13.3	14.5	14.3	12.1	13.1	13.4	10.3	5.2	118.0
Average snowy days (≥ 0.2 cm)	13.1	10.6	7.3	2.1	0.15	0.0	0.0	0.0	0.0	0.46	4.0	11.1	48.8
Source: Environment Canada

== Sports ==
Drummondville is home to the Quebec Maritimes Junior Hockey League (QMJHL)'s Drummondville Voltigeurs, founded in 1982. The team plays its home games at Centre Marcel Dionne. Drummondville also has another arena, Olympia Yvan-Cournoyer.

Drummondville and Victoriaville co-hosted the 2013 World U-17 Hockey Challenge.

Prior to the Voltigeurs, Drummondville was home to the Drummondville Rangers of the QMJHL from 1969 to 1974.

Drummondville also was host to several baseball teams in the Quebec Provincial League in the 1940s and 1950s. The Drummondville Tigers in 1940, the Drummondville Cubs from 1948-1952, the Drummondville Royals in 1953, and the Drummondville A's in 1954.

The Autodrome Drummond holds various automotive races throughout the summer season.

La Courvalloise is used for tubing, skiing, and snowboarding.

== Economy ==
Drummondville is home to the Promenades Drummondville regional shopping mall which has 109 stores.

MicroBird by Girardin has its headquarters in Drummondville.

== Transportation ==
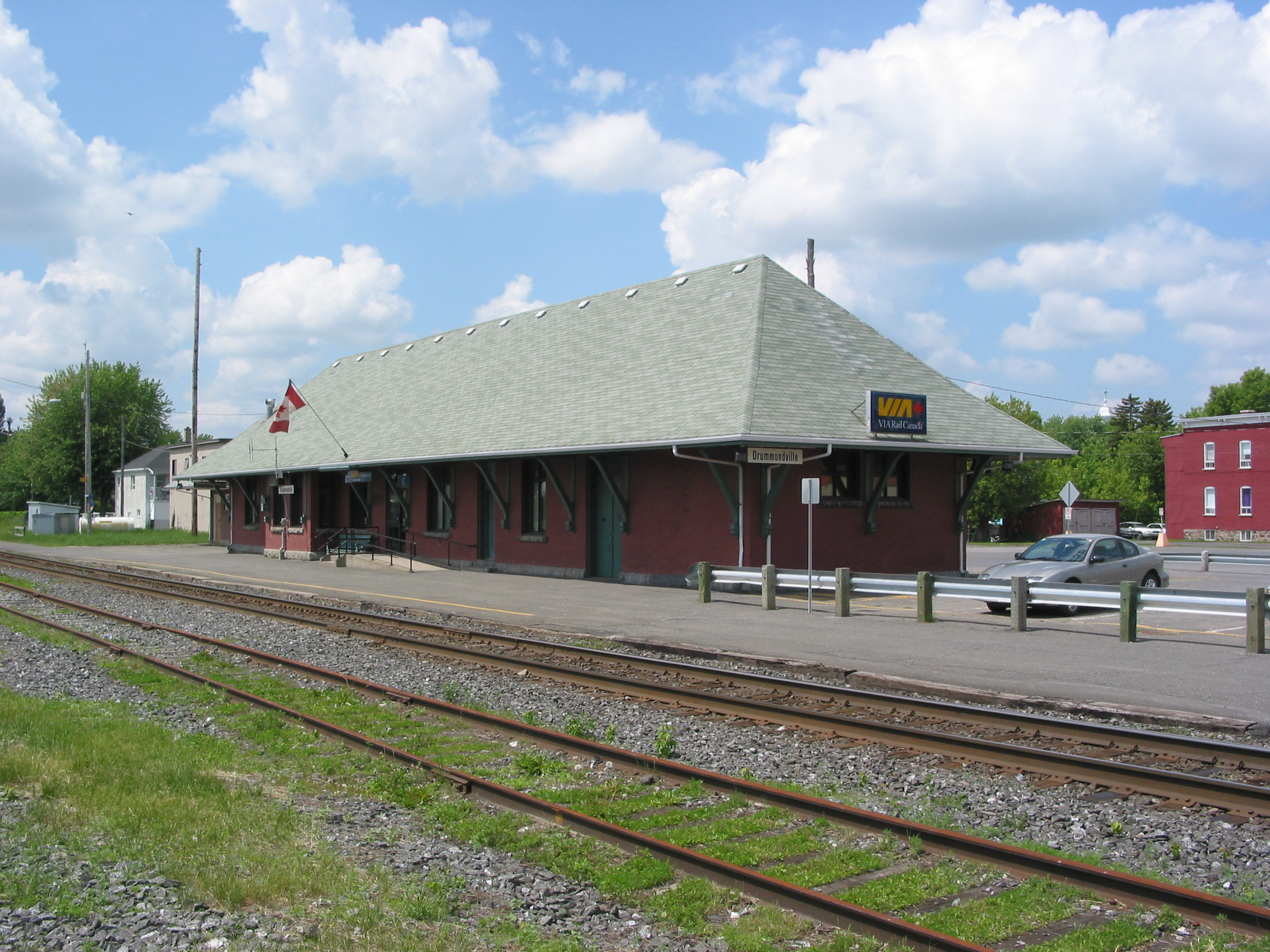
Drummondville railway station.

Highways

Drummondville is served by Autoroutes 20 and 55.

Local transit

Intra-city transit has been operated since 1987 by Drummondville Transit, which currently operates city bus services on six routes headquartered at the main bus terminal at Des Forges and Lindsay Streets. Service runs at half-hour intervals Monday to Saturday and hourly on Sundays.

Intercity buses

Intercity highway coach service is provided by Orléans Express and Groupe La Québécoise. Major destinations include the nearby cities of Montreal, Quebec City, Sherbrooke, Trois-Rivières, Victoriaville, Saint-Hyacinthe, and Thetford Mines.

Intercity rail

Passenger train service towards Montreal and Quebec City is provided by Via Rail. Drummondville is part of the high-traffic Quebec City–Windsor Corridor, and trains run at a rate of about five per day in either direction from the Drummondville railway station.

Air

General aviation services are available at the Drummondville Airport and the Drummondville Water Aerodrome.

== Education ==
Drummondville is home to the Cégep de Drummondville, a public French-language CEGEP. Drummondville is served by two school boards, the English-language Eastern Townships School Board and the French Centre de services scolaire des chenes.

== Notable people ==
- Louise Bédard, dancer and choreographer
- Jean Bégin, ice hockey coach
- Serge Boisvert, professional hockey player
- Alex Bourret, professional hockey player
- Yvan Cournoyer, professional hockey player
- Gabrielle David, professional hockey player
- Gilbert Dionne, professional hockey player
- Marcel Dionne, professional hockey player
- Nancy Drolet, Olympic silver medalist in hockey
- Jessica Dubé, Olympic ice skater
- Robert Dupuis, 28th Canadian Surgeon General
- Mickaël Gouin, actor and comedian
- Alan Haworth, professional hockey player
- Gordie Haworth, professional hockey player
- Kaïn, musical group
- Patrick Lalime, professional hockey player
- Yvon Lambert, professional hockey player
- Armour Landry, photographer
- Bernard Lemaire, businessman
- Danick Martel, professional hockey player
- Renée Martel, country singer
- Éric Messier, professional hockey player
- Louis Morissette, actor and screenwriter
- Lester Patrick, professional hockey player
- Jean-Luc Pepin, politician
- Mathieu Perreault, professional hockey player
- Michel Plante, professional hockey player
- Kim Poirier, actress
- Patrick Senécal, writer
- Karine Vanasse, actress
- John P. Webster, bank executive
- A Perfect Murder, musical group
- Les Trois Accords, musical group
- Yves-François Blanchet, politician, Leader of the Bloc Québécois

== Sister cities ==
- La Roche-sur-Yon, Vendée, Pays de la Loire, France
- Braine-l'Alleud, Walloon Brabant, Belgium
- Community of Communes Ackerland and Kochersberg, France

== See also ==
- Cégep de Drummondville
- List of cities in Quebec
- 21st-century municipal history of Quebec
- List of mayors of Drummondville
