= Noire River (Bulstrode River tributary) =

River in Centre-du-Québec, Quebec (Canada)

Bulstrode River
- Native name: Rivière Bulstrode (French)

Location
- Country: Canada
- Province: Quebec
- Region: Centre-du-Québec
- MRC: Arthabaska Regional County Municipality

Physical characteristics
- Source: Various agricultural streams
  - location: Princeville
  - coordinates: 46.143116°N 71.939957°W
  - elevation: 142 m (466 ft)
- Mouth: Bulstrode River
  - location: Saint-Valère
  - coordinates: 46.07139°N 72.13333°W
  - elevation: 87 m (285 ft)
- Length: 15.9 km (9.9 mi)

Basin features
- River system: Bulstrode River, Nicolet River, St. Lawrence River
- Tributaries
  - left: (upstream) ruisseau Landry-Labbé, ruisseau Marceau, ruisseau Houle-Labbé, ruisseau Cloutier-Labbé, ruisseau du Neuvième Rang de la Rivière Noire
  - right: (upstream) ruisseau Dugay, ruisseau Arthur-Rivard, ruisseau Boisvert, ruisseau Comeau, rivière Pimbina

The Noire River (French: Rivière Noire) is a tributary of the Bulstrode River whose current flows successively into the Nicolet River and St. Lawrence River. The Noire flows through the municipalities of Princeville, Saint-Rosaire and Saint-Valère, in the Arthabaska Regional County Municipality, in the administrative region of Centre-du-Québec, in Quebec, in Canada.

== Geography ==
The neighboring geographical slopes of the Noire River are:

- north side: Blanche River;
- east side: Bulstrode River;
- south side: Bulstrode River;
- west side: Bulstrode River, Béland stream, Blanche River.

The Noire takes its source from various agricultural streams, north of the town of Victoriaville, south-east of the village of Saint-Rosaire and south-west of the village of Princeville.

From its head area in Princeville, the river flows on 15.9 kilometres (9.9 mi) in the following segments:

- 1.5 kilometres (0.93 mi) westward, to the limit of the municipality of Saint-Rosaire;
- 0.5 kilometres (0.31 mi) west to route 162;
- 6.2 kilometres (3.9 mi) westward, to the third crossing of eighth rang, which is located at the confluence of the Pimbina river;
- 7.7 kilometres (4.8 mi) towards the west, passing north of the village of Saint-Valère, to its mouth.

The Noire River flows on the north bank of the Bulstrode River, 4.8 kilometres (3.0 mi) downstream from the Saint-Valère road bridge and upstream from the route 955 located in the village of Saint-Samuel.

== Toponymy ==
The toponym "rivière Noire" was made official on December 5, 1968, at the Commission de toponymie du Québec. The origin possibly comes from nearby peatlands.

== See also ==
- List of rivers of Quebec
