= Réseau des Appalaches =

Canadian radio broadcasting company

Réseau des Appalaches (Appalachian Network) is a radio broadcasting company in the Canadian province of Quebec, consisting of three stations based in southeastern Quebec. The company was founded by François Labbé in 1972, and was the first commercial French language radio network in Canada.

The company also formerly owned three additional radio stations in other communities in the region, which have since been sold to other broadcasters.

In April 2014, it was announced that Montreal-based Attraction Radio announced plans to acquire Réseau des Appalaches' stations.

== Stations ==
- Thetford Mines - CKLD ("Passion-Rock"), CFJO ("O97.3")
  - Disraeli - CJLP (rebroadcaster of CKLD)
- Victoriaville - CFDA ("Passion-Rock")

=== Former stations ===
- Lac-Mégantic - CKFL
- Plessisville - CKTL
- Val-des-Sources - CJAN
