= Blanche River (Nicolet River tributary) =

- Native name: Rivière Blanche (French)

Location
- Country: Canada
- Province: Quebec
- Region: Centre-du-Québec
- Regional County Municipality: Arthabaska

Physical characteristics
- Source: Mountain streams
  - location: Chesterville
  - coordinates: 45°59′22″N 71°46′39″W
  - elevation: 473 m (1,552 ft)
- Mouth: Nicolet River
  - location: Chesterville
  - coordinates: 45.92972°N 71.79195°W
  - elevation: 173 m (568 ft)
- Length: 10.5 km (6.5 mi)

Basin features
- Progression: Nicolet River, St. Lawrence River
- Tributaries
  - left: (upstream) Cours d'eau Hamel
  - right: (upstream)

The Blanche river (French: rivière Blanche, pronounced [ʁivjɛʁ blɑ̃ʃ], lit. 'White River') is a tributary of the Nicolet River which flows on the south shore of the St. Lawrence River. The Blanche River flows entirely in the municipality of Chesterville, in the Arthabaska Regional County Municipality (MRC), in the Centre-du-Québec region, in the province of Quebec, in Canada.

== Geography ==
The neighboring hydrographic slopes of the Blanche River are:

- north side: Gobeil stream, Bulstrode River, L'Heureux stream;
- east side: Gobeil stream, Marras stream, rivière du Huit, Bulstrode River;
- south side: Nicolet River, Aulnes stream;
- west side: Dumont River, Brooks River, Nicolet River.

The "Blanche River" has its source in the mountainous area at 5.2 kilometres (3.2 mi) northeast of the village of Chesterville in the municipality of Chesterville and at 1.3 kilometres (0.81 mi) to the southwest of the limit of the Municipality of Sainte-Hélène-de-Chester.

It flows over 10.5 kilometres (6.5 mi) according to the following segmentsː

- 2.0 kilometres (1.2 mi) southwesterly, crossing Chemin du Rang Campagna and Chemin Craig Nord, to the confluence of a stream (coming from the north);
- 4.5 kilometres (2.8 mi) southward, up to the confluence of the Chûtes mortes stream;
- 0.8 kilometres (0.50 mi) southward, passing under the Rang Fréchette road bridge and under the Rang Saint-Philippe road bridge, to the confluence of the Hamel watercourse;
- 3.2 kilometres (2.0 mi) towards the southwest, crossing route 161, to its mouth.

The Blanche river flows on the east bank of the Nicolet River in the hamlet "Domaine-de-la-Halte", at 4.0 kilometres (2.5 mi) (in direct line) to the south-east of center of the village of Chesterville, at 1.9 kilometres (1.2 mi) downstream of the municipal limit of Saint-Rémi-de-Tingwick and at 4.8 kilometres (3.0 mi) at north-west of the village of Ham-Nord.

== Toponymy ==
The toponym "rivière Blanche" was made official on September 5, 1985, at the Commission de toponymie du Québec.

== See also ==
- List of rivers of Quebec
