= Dumont River =

River in Centre-du-Québec, Quebec (Canada)

- Native name: Rivière Dumont (French)

Location
- Country: Canada
- Province: Quebec
- Region: Centre-du-Québec
- MRC: Arthabaska Regional County Municipality
- Municipality: Chesterville

Physical characteristics
- Source: Mountain streams
  - location: Chesterville
  - coordinates: 45.969314°N 71.829716°W
  - elevation: 264 m (866 ft)
- Mouth: Nicolet River
  - location: Chesterville
  - coordinates: 45.95528°N 71.83556°W
  - elevation: 152 m (499 ft)
- Length: 4.1 km (2.5 mi)

Basin features
- River system: St. Lawrence River
- Tributaries
  - left: (upstream)
  - right: (upstream)

The Dumont River (in French: rivière Dumont) is a tributary of the Nicolet River which flows on the south shore of the St. Lawrence River. The Dumont River flows entirely in the municipality of Chesterville, in the Arthabaska Regional County Municipality (MRC), in the administrative region of Centre-du-Québec, in Quebec, in Canada.

== Geography ==
The neighboring hydrographic slopes of the Dumont River are:

- north side: Brooks River, Bulstrode River, L'Heureux stream;
- east side: Gobeil stream, Bulstrode River;
- south side: Blanche River;
- west side: Nicolet River.

The "Dumont River" has its source in a mountainous area at 1.8 kilometres (1.1 mi) north of the village of Chesterville in the municipality of Chesterville, between two mountains (summit of 300 metres (980 ft) to the west and 482 metres (1,581 ft) to the east).

The Dumont river flows on 4.1 kilometres (2.5 mi) according to the following segmentsː

- 3.1 kilometres (1.9 mi) west, then south, passing north of the village of Chesterville, to Chemin Craig Nord which crosses this village;
- 1.0 kilometre (0.62 mi) to the southwest, crossing under the railway, to its mouth.

The Dumont River empties on the northeast shore of the Nicolet River at 1.4 kilometres (0.87 mi) southwest of the center of the village of Chesterville.

== Toponymy ==
The term "Dumont" constitutes a family name of French-speaking origin.

The toponym "rivière Dumont" was made official on September 5, 1985, at the Commission de toponymie du Québec.

== See also ==
- List of rivers of Quebec
