= François Labbé =

Canadian mass media owner (1928–2018)

François Labbé (September 23, 1928 – December 24, 2018) was a Canadian mass media owner who started the first commercial French-language radio network in Canada, the Réseau des Appalaches, in 1972.

== Life and career ==
Born in Thetford Mines, Quebec on September 23, 1928, the son of former Member of Parliament and Thetford Mines mayor Tancrède Labbé, Labbé studied Commerce at Laval University. He acquired CKLD in Thetford Mines in 1959. In 1968, he founded CKFL, an AM radio station in Lac-Mégantic, and in 1970 he bought CFDA in Victoriaville.

In 1972, he founded CKTL in Plessisville and CJAN in Asbestos. The radio stations became the Réseau des Appalaches. In 1977, Labbé founded CJLP in Disraeli, which became the sixth station in the Réseau des Appalaches.

Labbé was also the owner of Publications Appalaches, which owned two newspapers, La Feuille d'Érable in Plessisville and La Mine d'Information in Thetford Mines. He was also a director of the insurance company La Solidarité and a governor of the Université Laval Foundation.

In 1989, he founded CFJO-FM which broadcast to Thetford Mines and Victoriaville with his daughter Annie. In 1990, Labbé sold CKFL, CJAN and CKTL but retains ownership of other stations.

In 1998, Labbé was named to the Canadian Association of Broadcasters Broadcast Hall of Fame.

Labbé died in Thetford Mines on December 24, 2018, at the age of 90.
