= Blanche River (Bulstrode River tributary) =

River in Centre-du-Québec, Quebec (Canada)

- Location within Quebec
- Native name: Rivière Blanche (French)

Location
- Country: Canada
- Province: Quebec
- Region: Centre-du-Québec
- MRC: Arthabaska Regional County Municipality

Physical characteristics
- Source: Various agricultural streams
  - location: Victoriaville
  - coordinates: 46.069588°N 72.014348°W
  - elevation: 130 m (430 ft)
- Mouth: Bulstrode River
  - location: Saint-Valère
  - coordinates: 46.06472°N 72.10139°W
  - elevation: 97 m (318 ft)
- Length: 9.2 km (5.7 mi)

Basin features
- River system: Nicolet River, St. Lawrence River
- Tributaries
  - left: (upstream)
  - right: (upstream)

The Blanche River (French: rivière Blanche, pronounced [ʁivjɛʁ blɑ̃ʃ], lit. 'White River') is a tributary of the Bulstrode River whose current flows successively into the Nicolet River and St. Lawrence River. The Blanche river flows in the town of Victoriaville and in the municipality of Saint-Valère, in the Arthabaska Regional County Municipality (MRC), in the administrative region of Centre-du-Québec, in province of Quebec, in Canada.

== Geography ==
The neighboring geographic slopes of the Blanche River are:

- north side: Bulstrode River;
- east side: Bulstrode River, Blanchette stream;
- south side: Nicolet River;
- west side: Bergeron stream, Martin stream.

The Blanche river takes its source from various agricultural streams, in an agricultural zone of the Courtois range, located north of the hamlet "Place-Béréli", north-east of Saint-Albert, southwest of the town of Victoriaville and north of the Nicolet River.

From its head area, the river flows on 9.2 kilometres (5.7 mi) in the following segments:

- 3.5 kilometres (2.2 mi) southwesterly, to the second crossing of route 122;
- 5.7 kilometres (3.5 mi) towards the north-west, to its mouth.

The Blanche river flows on the south bank of the Bulstrode River, in front of the village of Saint-Valère and downstream of Victoriaville.

== Toponymy ==
The toponym "rivière Blanche" was made official on July 4, 1980, at the Commission de toponymie du Québec.

== See also ==
- Arthabaska Regional County Municipality (MRC)
- Victoriaville, a city
- Saint-Valère, a municipality
- Bulstrode River, a stream
- Nicolet River, a stream
- List of rivers of Quebec
