= L'Abbé River (Bulstrode River tributary) =

River in Centre-du-Québec, Quebec (Canada)

- Native name: Rivière L'Abbé (French)

Location
- Country: Canada
- Province: Quebec
- Region: Centre-du-Québec
- MRC: Arthabaska Regional County Municipality

Physical characteristics
- Source: Various agricultural streams
  - location: Princeville
  - coordinates: 46.13791°N 71.85579°W
  - elevation: 158 m (518 ft)
- Mouth: Bulstrode River
  - location: Victoriaville
  - coordinates: 46.07833°N 71.96389°W
  - elevation: 134 m (440 ft)
- Length: 13.8 km (8.6 mi)

Basin features
- River system: Bulstrode River, Nicolet River, St. Lawrence River
- Tributaries
  - left: (upstream)
  - right: (upstream)

The L'Abbé River (in French: rivière L'Abbé) is a watercourse whose mouth flows into the Bulstrode River in the town of Victoriaville, in the Arthabaska Regional County Municipality (MRC), in the administrative region of Centre-du-Québec, in Quebec, in Canada.

The L'Abbé river flows mainly in agricultural areas.

== Geography ==
The neighboring geographical slopes of the L'Abbé river are on the north or west side the Bulstrode River, on the east side the Gosselin River and on the south side the Nicolet River.

The Abbé River originates from various agricultural streams, in an agricultural area northwest of Norbertville and south of the Bulstrode River.

From its head, the river flows more parallel to the Lachance River, over 13.8 kilometres (8.6 mi). From the source, the river runs 1.7 kilometres (1.1 mi) southwest, to route 263. Then, it flows on 5.0 kilometres (3.1 mi) towards the southwest, up to two bodies of water developed by the city. It then goes 3.9 kilometres (2.4 mi) south, up to route 116. Finally, it flows on 3.2 kilometres (2.0 mi) towards the southwest, crossing route 122, to its mouth.

The l'Abbé river flows on the east bank of the Bulstrode river, upstream of the Beaudet Reservoir, located in the northern part of the town of Victoriaville.

== Toponymy ==
The toponym "rivière l'Abbé" was made official on August 7, 1978, at the Bank of place names of the Commission de toponymie du Québec.

== See also ==
- Arthabaska Regional County Municipality
- Princeville
- Victoriaville
- Nicolet River
- Bulstrode River
- List of rivers of Quebec
