= Gosselin River =

Gosselin River may refer to:

- Gosselin River (Fortier River tributary), in Mauricie, Quebec, Canada
- Gosselin River (Nicolet River tributary), in Centre-du-Québec, Quebec, Canada
