= L'Abbé River =

L'Abbé River or Rivière L'Abbé may refer to:

- L'Abbé River (Bulstrode River tributary), Victoriaville, Arthabaska Regional County Municipality, Centre-du-Québec, Quebec, Canada
- L'Abbé River (Métabetchouane River tributary), Le Domaine-du-Roy Regional County Municipality, Saguenay–Lac-Saint-Jean, Quebec, Canada

== See also ==
- Abbé Huard River, a tributary of the Romaine River, Côte-Nord, Quebec, Canada
