= CKLD-FM =

Radio station in Thetford Mines, Quebec

Coordinates: 46°04′36″N 71°15′48″W

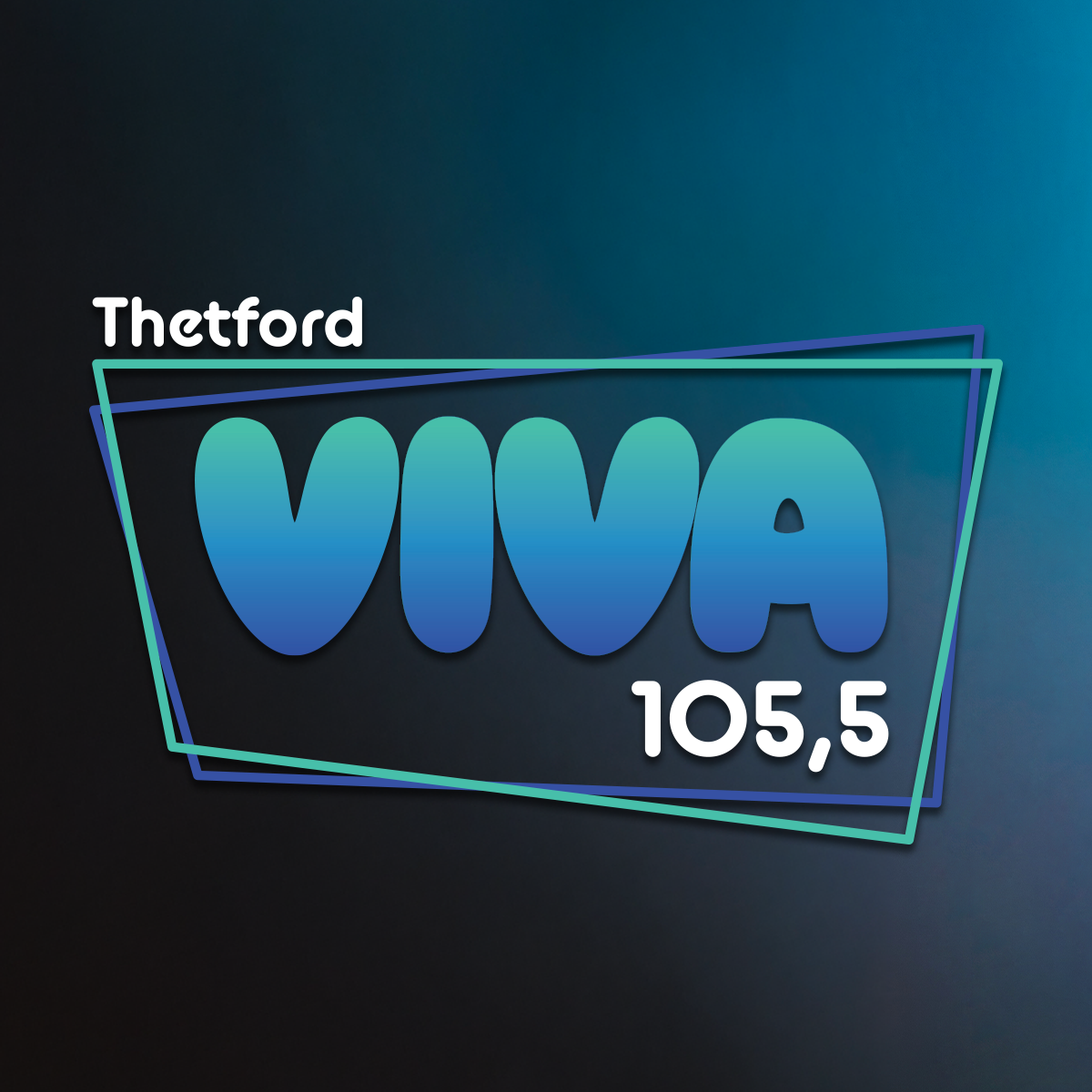

Thetford Mines, Quebec; Canada
- Frequency: 105.5 MHz
- Branding: Viva 105,5

Programming
- Language: French
- Format: Adult contemporary

Ownership
- Owner: Arsenal Media
- Sister stations: CFDA-FM, CFJO-FM

History
- First air date: February 12, 1950
- Former frequencies: 1230 kHz (1950–1976); 1330 kHz (1976–1999)

Technical information
- Class: A
- ERP: 6 kW
- HAAT: 90.5 metres (297 ft)

CKLD-FM is a Canadian radio station, broadcasting an Adult contemporary format at 105.5 FM in Thetford Mines, Quebec. It shares the programming of sister station CFDA-FM in Victoriaville.

The stations air the same programming at all times, although both stations produce a portion of the shared broadcast schedule from separate studios. Their CHR sister station CFJO-FM also produces programming in both cities, although it serves the region from a single 100-kilowatt transmitter.

== History ==
The station was launched on February 12, 1950 by Radio Mégantic. Broadcasting on 1230 AM, it was a private affiliate of the Radio-Canada network. François Labbé became president of the company in 1965.

The station moved to 1330 AM in 1976, and disaffiliated from Radio-Canada in 1979. The station moved to its current frequency in 1999.

In April 2014, Montreal-based Attraction Radio (now Arsenal Media) announced plans to acquire all of Réseau des Appalaches' stations, including CKLD-FM and CJLP-FM; the decision is currently awaiting CRTC approval.

== Rebroadcasters ==
Rebroadcasters of CKLD-FM
City of licence	Identifier	Frequency	Power	Class	RECNet
Disraeli	CJLP-FM	107.1 FM	104 watts	A1	Query
