= CFDA =

CFDA may refer to:

- CFDA-FM, a radio station (101.9 FM) licensed to Victoriaville, Quebec, Canada
- Catalog of Federal Domestic Assistance, a federal assistance research guide
- China Food and Drug Administration, a Chinese certification authority
- Council of Fashion Designers of America
- Carboxyfluorescein diacetate, a fluorescent dye
