= Lachance River =

River in Centre-du-Québec, Quebec (Canada)

- Native name: Rivière Lachance (French)

Location
- Country: Canada
- Province: Quebec
- Region: Centre-du-Québec
- MRC: Arthabaska Regional County Municipality
- Municipality: Victoriaville (sector Arthabaska), Saint-Norbert

Physical characteristics
- Source: Ruisseau Daigle-Sévigny
  - location: Saint-Norbert
  - coordinates: 46.11333°N 71.85416°W
  - elevation: 152 m (499 ft)
- Mouth: Gosselin River
  - location: Victoriaville (sector Saint-Christophe-d'Arthabaska)
  - coordinates: 46.06166°N 71.91333°W
  - elevation: 150 m (490 ft)
- Length: 9.5 km (5.9 mi)

Basin features
- Progression: Gosselin River, Nicolet River, St. Lawrence River
- Tributaries
  - left: (upstream)
  - right: (upstream)

The Lachance river (in French: rivière Lachance) is a watercourse whose mouth flows into the Gosselin River, a tributary of the Nicolet River in the city of Victoriaville, in the Arthabaska Regional County Municipality (MRC), in the administrative region of Centre-du-Québec, in Quebec, in Canada.

The Lachance River sometimes flows in agricultural and urban areas.

== Geography ==
The neighboring watersheds of the Lachance River are:

- north side: Bulstrode River, L'Abbé River;
- east side: Gosselin River;
- south side: Nicolet River;
- west side: Nicolet River.

The Lachance river has its source west of the Demers road, north of the hamlet of Saint-Norbert.

The river flows more or less parallel (on the west side) to the Gosselin river.

The Lachance River flows on the east bank of the Gosselin River, in an area northeast of the city of Victoriaville, in the small valley dominated by Mont Saint-Michel. Its confluence is located 3.8 kilometres (2.4 mi) upstream from the confluence of the Gosselin River (Nicolet River tributary) with the Nicolet River.

== Toponymy ==
The toponym Rivière Lachance was made official on August 7, 1978, at the Place Names Bank of the Commission de toponymie du Québec.

== See also ==
- List of rivers of Quebec
