= CFDA-FM =

Radio station in Victoriaville, Quebec, Canada

Coordinates: 46°03′10″N 71°53′11″W

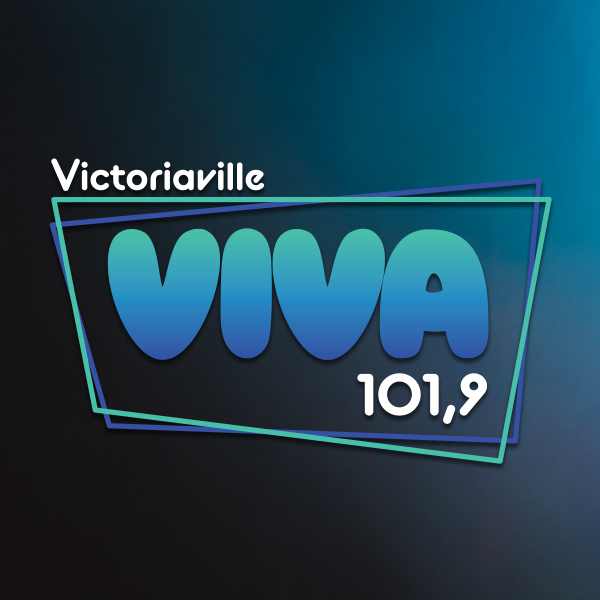
- Victoriaville, Quebec; Canada
- Frequency: 101.9 MHz
- Branding: Viva 101,9

Programming
- Language: French
- Format: Adult contemporary

Ownership
- Owner: Arsenal Media
- Sister stations: CKLD-FM, CFJO-FM

History
- First air date: October 19, 1951
- Call sign meaning: Canada Français Drummond Arthabaska

Technical information
- Class: A
- ERP: 1.35 kW

CFDA-FM is a Canadian radio station, broadcasting an adult contemporary format at 101.9 FM in Victoriaville, Quebec. It shares the programming of sister station CKLD-FM in Thetford Mines.

The stations air the same programming at all times, although both stations produce a portion of the shared broadcast schedule from separate studios. Their CHR sister station CFJO-FM also produces programming in both cities, although it serves the region from a single 100-kilowatt transmitter.

== History ==
The station was launched by Radio Victoriaville on October 19, 1951, airing on 1380 AM. It was sold to François Labbé's Radio-Mégantic in 1970, becoming a Radio-Canada affiliate as part of the Réseau des Appalaches from 1972 to 1979.

The station subsequently converted to its current FM frequency in 1999.

In April 2014, Montreal-based Attraction Radio (now Arsenal Media) announced plans to acquire all of Réseau des Appalaches' stations, including CFDA-FM; the decision is currently awaiting CRTC approval.

Pierre Bruneau, the current anchor of TVA's daytime newscasts, worked for CFDA early in his career.
