= Brooks River =

- Native name: Rivière Brooks (French)

Location
- Country: Canada
- Province: Quebec
- Region: Centre-du-Québec
- Regional County Municipality: Arthabaska

Physical characteristics
- Source: Mountain streams
  - location: Chesterville
  - coordinates: 46°01′11″N 71°49′04″W
  - elevation: 326 m (1,070 ft)
- Mouth: Nicolet River
  - location: Chesterville
  - coordinates: 45.97583°N 71.85944°W
  - elevation: 143 m (469 ft)
- Length: 10.0 km (6.2 mi)

Basin features
- Progression: Nicolet River, St. Lawrence River
- Tributaries
  - left: (upstream): Lemay stream; Desrochers stream
  - right: (upstream): black stream; Laroche stream; Perreault stream; Verville stream; Hince stream

The Brooks River (in French: rivière Brooks) is a tributary of the Nicolet River which flows on the south shore of the St. Lawrence River. The Brooks River flows in the municipalities of Chesterville and Saint-Christophe-d'Arthabaska, in the Arthabaska Regional County Municipality (MRC), in the region of Centre-du-Québec, in Quebec, in Canada.

== Geography ==
The neighboring hydrographic slopes of the Brooks River are:

- north side: Bulstrode River
- east side: Gobeil stream, Bulstrode River
- south side: Dumont River, Nicolet River
- west side: Nicolet River, Roux stream

The "Brooks River" has its source in a mountainous area in the seventh range, in the township municipality of Ham-Nord, at 0.5 kilometres (0.31 mi) west of the limit of the municipality of Saint-Norbert-d'Arthabaska, at 0.6 kilometres (0.37 mi) from the limit of Sainte-Hélène-de-Chester and at 0.6 kilometres (0.37 mi) east of Saint-Christophe-d'Arthabaska.

The Brooks River flows on 10.0 kilometres (6.2 mi) in the following segmentsː

- 1.3 kilometres (0.81 mi) southwesterly, to the limit of the municipality of Saint-Christophe-d'Arthabaska
- 0.7 kilometres (0.43 mi) west, to the north shore of a small lake (lengthː 0.4 kilometres (0.25 mi); altitudeː 276 metres (906 ft)) that the current crosses to the south
- 0.4 kilometres (0.25 mi) southward, up to the limit of the municipality of Chesterville
- 3.8 kilometres (2.4 mi) towards the south, until the confluence of a stream (coming from the east)
- 1.6 kilometres (0.99 mi) southward, to the route du eighth rang (rang Desharnais)
- 1.4 kilometres (0.87 mi) southward, to the route du ninth rang (rang Roberge)
- 0.4 kilometres (0.25 mi) south, to its mouth

The river flows over 1.4 kilometres (0.87 mi) in the municipality of Saint-Christophe-d'Arthabaska.

== Toponymy ==
The term "Brooks" refers to a family surname of English origin. This toponym refers to four members of the Brooks family who obtained grants on more than 600 acres of land on December 10, 1823, in the ranges of Craig South Road and North Craig Road.

The toponym "Brooks River" was formalized on August 17, 1978, at the Commission de toponymie du Québec.

== See also ==
- List of rivers of Quebec
