= Gosselin River (Nicolet River tributary) =

River in Centre-du-Québec, Quebec (Canada)

- Native name: Rivière Gosselin (French)

Location
- Country: Canada
- Province: Quebec
- Region: Centre-du-Québec
- MRC: Nicolet-Yamaska Regional County Municipality
- Municipality: Victoriaville (sector Arthabaska), Saint-Norbert

Physical characteristics
- Source: Mountains streams
  - location: Victoriaville (sector Arthabaska)
  - coordinates: 46.02599°N 71.81305°W
  - elevation: 310 m (1,020 ft)
- Mouth: Nicolet River
  - location: Victoriaville (sector Saint-Christophe-d'Arthabaska)
  - coordinates: 46.04°N 71.93833°W
  - elevation: 131 m (430 ft)
- Length: 18.7 km (11.6 mi)

Basin features
- Tributaries
  - left: (upstream) Lachance River, ruisseau Houle
  - right: (upstream) ruisseau Bernard, ruisseau Paris

The Gosselin River (in French: rivière Gosselin) is a tributary of Nicolet River passing through Saint-Norbert-d'Arthabaska, Saint-Christophe d'Arthabaska and Victoriaville, in the regional county municipality (MRC) of Arthabaska Regional County Municipality, in the administrative region of Centre-du-Québec, in Quebec, in Canada.

The Gosselin River sometimes flows in agricultural, forest and urban areas.

== Geography ==
The neighboring watersheds of the Gosselin River are:

- north side: Bulstrode River, l'Abbé River, Lachance River;
- east side: Gobeil stream;
- south side: Nicolet River, Roux stream, Brooks River;
- west side: Nicolet River.

The Gosselin River takes its source from a small lake located to the east of the Arthabaska sector of the city of Victoriaville and to the east of Mont Saint-Michel.

From its head, the Gosselin river flows on 18.7 kilometres (11.6 mi) in the following segments:

- 8.0 kilometres (5.0 mi) northward, to the confluence of Houle brook;
- 6.7 kilometres (4.2 mi) southwesterly, to the confluence of the Lachance River;
- 3.5 kilometres (2.2 mi) southwesterly, crossing the Arthabaska sector of the city of Victoriaville, to route 116;
- 0.5 kilometres (0.31 mi) towards the southwest, until its confluence.

Note: The course of the Gosselin river completely bypasses Mont Saint-Michel on the north side.

The mouth of the Gosselin River flows onto the north shore of the Nicolet River. Its confluence is located in the south-central part of the city of Victoriaville, on the west side of route 116 and north of avenue Pie-X.

== Toponymy ==
The toponym Rivière Gosselin was formalized on December 5, 1968, at the Place Names Bank of the Commission de toponymie du Québec.

== See also ==
- List of rivers of Quebec
