= Cégep de Victoriaville =

Public college in Victoriaville, Quebec

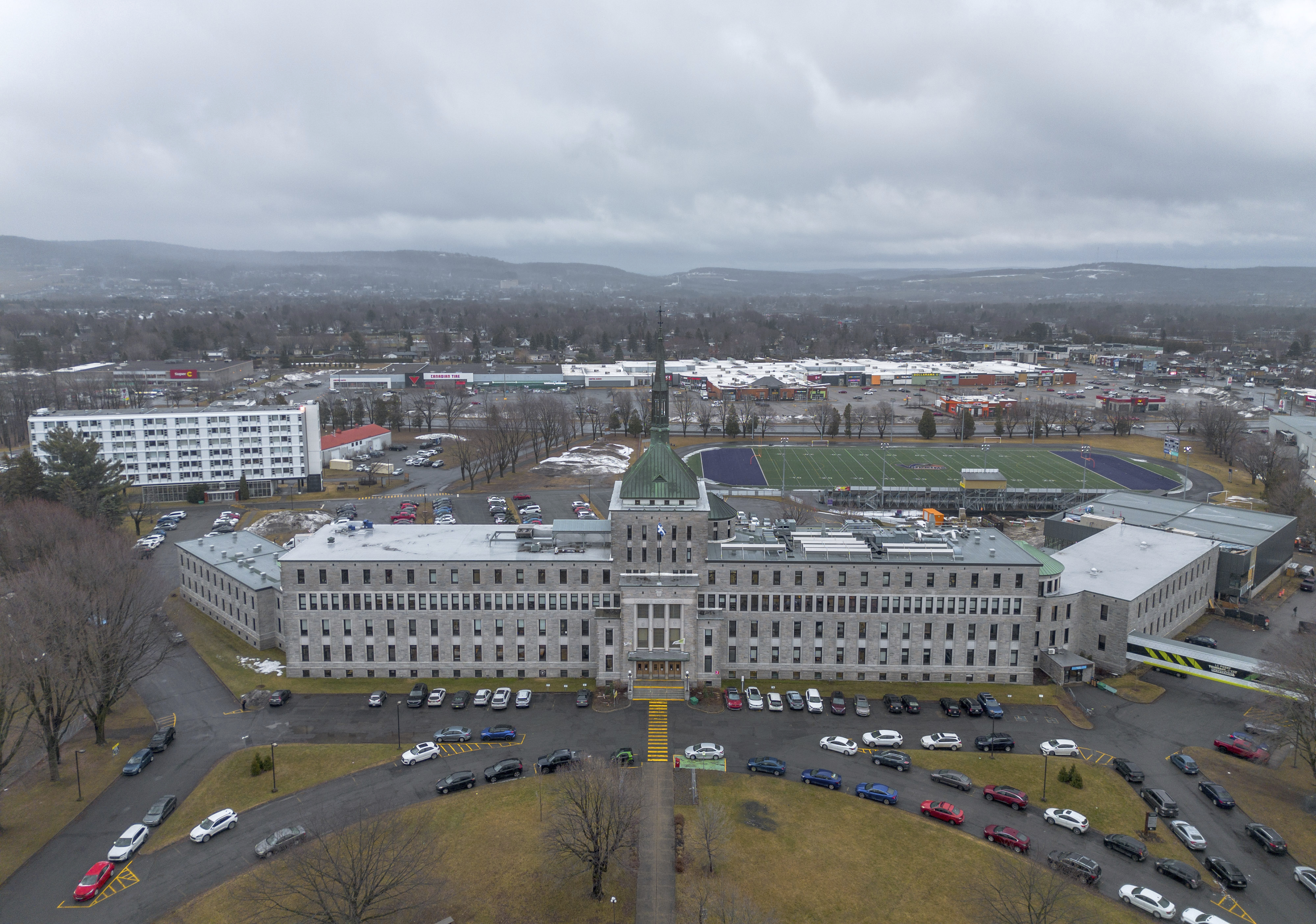
- Motto: Choisis ta vie (French)
- Motto in English: Your Choices for your life
- Type: Public CEGEP
- Established: 1967
- Academic affiliations: ACCC, CCAA, QSSF, AUCC,
- Location: 475, rue Notre-Dame Est; Victoriaville, Quebec; G6P 4B3; 46°3′36.50″N 71°56′41.56″W
- Campus: Urban
- Website: www.cegepvicto.ca

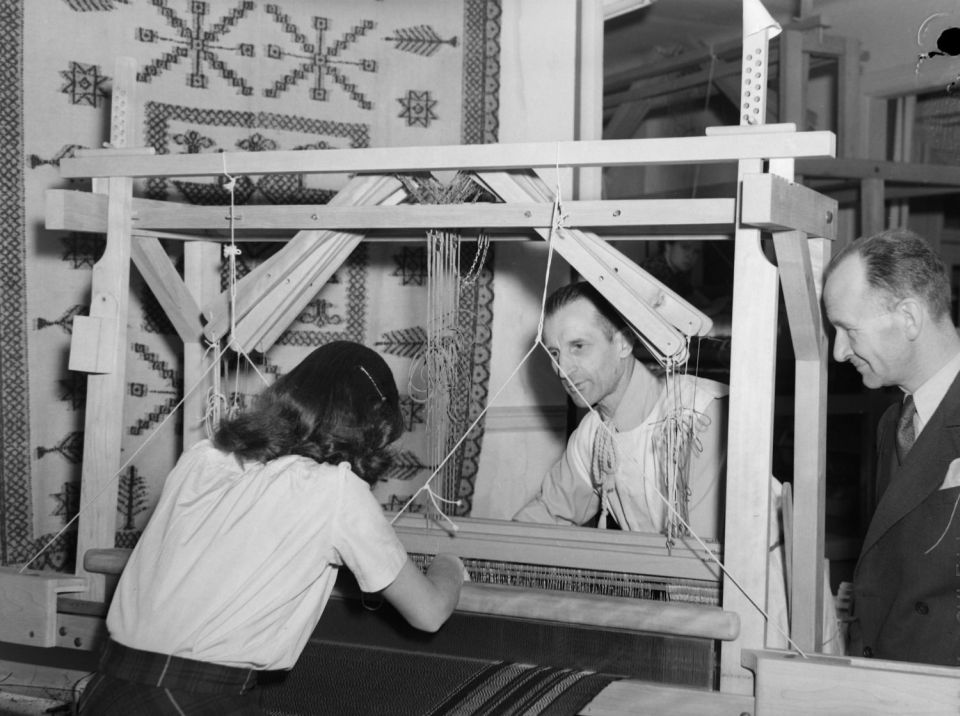
École du Meuble in 1948

Cégep de Victoriaville is a post-secondary institution (CEGEP, or junior college) in Victoriaville, Quebec, Canada.

== History ==
The college traces its origins to the merger of several institutions which became public ones in 1967, when the Quebec system of CEGEPs was created.

== Programs ==
The CEGEP offers two types of programs: pre-university and technical. The pre-university programs, which take two years to complete, cover the subject matters which roughly correspond to the additional year of high school given elsewhere in Canada in preparation for a chosen field in university. The technical programs, which take three-years to complete, applies to students who wish to pursue a skill trade.

It was created in 1969 from the merger of a classical college ("collège classique" in French), Collège Sacré-Cœur, and the École du meuble et du bois ouvré (Furniture and woodworking school). The furniture and woodworking school is now known as the École nationale du meuble et de l'ébénisterie.

== See also ==
- List of colleges in Quebec
- Higher education in Quebec
