= Bulstrode River =

River in Centre-du-Québec, Quebec (Canada)

- Native name: Rivière Bulstrode (French)

Location
- Country: Canada
- Province: Quebec
- Region: Chaudière-Appalaches and Centre-du-Québec
- MRC: Les Appalaches Regional County Municipality, Arthabaska Regional County Municipality, L'Érable Regional County Municipality

Physical characteristics
- Source: Mountains streams
  - location: Saint-Fortunat
  - coordinates: 45.9677089°N 71.5909731°W
  - elevation: 448 m (1,470 ft)
- Mouth: Nicolet River
  - location: Saint-Samuel
  - coordinates: 46.04583°N 72.25333°W
  - elevation: 130 m (430 ft)
- Length: 90 km (56 mi)

Basin features
- River system: Nicolet River, St. Lawrence River
- Tributaries
  - left: (upstream) ruisseau Center, ruisseau Martin, Blanche River, L'Abbé River, ruisseau Gobeil, rivière du Huit, cours d'eau Boilard.
  - right: (upstream) Ruisseau Gagnon, ruisseau Godin, ruisseau Béland, branche Piché-Bergeron, Noire River, ruisseau Houle-Labbé, ruisseau Allard, ruisseau Parent, ruisseau Plante, ruisseau des Aulnes, ruisseau Perreault, ruisseau Côté.

The Bulstrode River (French: rivière Bulstrode) is a tributary of Nicolet River, in Quebec, in Canada. From its source, this river flows north, north-west, then south-west, crossing ten municipalities:

- Les Appalaches Regional County Municipality (MRC), administrative region Chaudière-Appalaches: municipality of Saint-Fortunat;
- Arthabaska Regional County Municipality (MRC), administrative region Centre-du-Québec: municipality of Sainte-Hélène-de-Chester, Saint-Norbert-d'Arthabaska, Victoriaville, Saint-Valère, Saint-Samuel; and
- L'Érable Regional County Municipality (MRC), administrative region Centre-du-Québec: municipality of Sainte-Sophie-d'Halifax, Princeville.

The Bulstrode River sometimes flows in agricultural areas, sometimes in forest areas.

== Geography ==
The neighboring geographic slopes of the Bulstrode River are:

- north side: Bécancour River, Bourbon River, Noire River;
- south side: Nicolet River, Lachance River, Gosselin River;
- east side: Bécancour River, Larochelle River, rivière au Pin.

Over 90 kilometres (56 mi) long, the Bulstrode River draws its source in the mountainous terrain of Saint-Fortunat in the eighth rang East, at the limit of Saint-Jacques-le-Majeur-de-Wolfestown.

On its southerly course, the Bulstrode River flows into the Nicolet River at Saint-Samuel. The current crosses the Gaudet Reservoir in Victoriaville, from north to southwest, to the dam erected at the mouth. From the dam, the river bypasses the urban sector of Victoriaville, flowing westward on 1.8 kilometres (1.1 mi) before branching southward where it flows on 3.1 kilometres (1.9 mi); then redirects towards the village of Saint-Valère, heading west; then south-west towards Saint-Samuel.

== Toponymy ==
The term "Bulstrode" is linked to a river, a township, a street in Victoriaville, a municipality "Saint-Valère-de-Bulstrode" and a former name of a hamlet (today designated "hameau Defoy"). The Bulstrode River merges with Nicolet River west of Victoriaville. The river drains the waters of the municipalities of Saint-Valère, Saint-Samuel and Victoriaville. The Bulstrod River crosses the township of the same name.

Several hypotheses explain the origin of this name. This toponym evokes in particular the memory of the knight Richard Bulstrode (1610–1711), ambassador of England in the 17th century. He was the son of Edward Bulstrode (1588–1659), and spent his long life in the service of Charles I, Charles II, then James II. He also wrote memoirs which contributed to his popularity. The name of this river could also refer to a place designated "Bulstrode Park", in England, whose toponymic origin remains unclear.

The toponym "Bulstrode River" was made official on December 5, 1968, at the Place Names Bank of the Commission de toponymie du Québec.

== Ecology ==
In 1875, the Bulstrode River and the Nicolet River were recognized as one of the most noted streams for salmon, where they weighed an average of 18 to 24 pounds.

== See also ==
- List of rivers of Quebec
