= CFJO-FM =

Radio station in Thetford Mines, Quebec, Canada

- Thetford Mines, Quebec; Canada
- Broadcast area: Southeastern Quebec
- Frequency: 97.3 MHz
- Branding: O97,3

Programming
- Language: French
- Format: Contemporary hit radio

Ownership
- Owner: Arsenal Media
- Sister stations: CKLD-FM; CFDA-FM

History
- First air date: July 15, 1989

Technical information
- Licensing authority: CRTC
- Class: C1
- ERP: 100,000 watts
- HAAT: 252 metres (827 ft)
- Transmitter coordinates: 46°03′28″N 71°38′04″W

Links
- Website: o973.ca

CFJO-FM (97.3 FM, "O97,3") is a French language radio station licensed to Thetford Mines, Quebec, Canada, featuring a contemporary hit radio format. Its motto is "Le Meilleur de la musique", which means "The Best of Music".

The station has studios in both Thetford Mines and Victoriaville, sharing facilities with its soft adult contemporary sister stations CKLD-FM and CFDA-FM. Both cities are served by the same transmitter, and both studios produce part of the station's broadcast schedule — however, Thetford Mines is considered the station's primary city of licence.

== History ==
The station first received CRTC approval in 1988. It was launched on 103.3 FM on July 15, 1989. by media mogul François Labbé, who already owned many radio stations consolidated as the Réseau des Appalaches. It moved to its current 97.3 frequency in 1997.

The first song played on the radio for the year 2000, was "Video Killed the Radio Star" by the Buggles.

In April 2014, Montreal-based Attraction Radio (now Arsenal Media) announced plans to acquire all of Réseau des Appalaches' stations, including CFJO-FM; the decision is currently awaiting CRTC approval.

== Rebroadcasters ==
Rebroadcasters of CFJO-FM
City of licence	Identifier	Frequency	Power	Class	RECNet	CRTC Decision
Lac-Mégantic	CFJO-FM-1	101.7	2,400 watts	A	Query	
