= CKYQ-FM =

Radio station in Plessisville, Quebec, Canada

Coordinates: 46°10′10″N 71°40′19″W

- Plessisville, Quebec; Canada
- Frequency: 95.7 MHz
- Branding: Hit Country 95.7

Programming
- Format: Country

Ownership
- Owner: Arsenal Media

History
- First air date: October 18, 1972

Technical information
- Class: A
- ERP: 1 kW
- HAAT: 145 metres (476 ft)

Links
- Website: hitcountry.com/hit-country-957

CKYQ-FM is a Canadian radio station, broadcasting at 95.7 FM in Plessisville, Quebec. Owned by Arsenal Media, the station airs a Country format branded as Hit Country.

== History ==
The station was launched in 1972 by François Labbé, and aired on 1420 AM with the call sign CKTL as part of the Réseau des Appalaches. It was a private affiliate of Radio-Canada until 1979, when it reaffiliated with the Telemedia Radio Network.

The station was sold to 176100 Canada Inc. in 1991, and converted to FM in 1996. The station would later be sold to Attraction Radio in 2013.

CKYQ-FM was sold to Arsenal Media and later changed to its current Hit Country 95.7.

== Rebroadcasters ==
Rebroadcasters of CKYQ-FM
City of licence	Identifier	Frequency	Power	Class	RECNet	CRTC Decision
Victoriaville	CKYQ-FM-1	103.5	50 watts	LP	Query	2005-179

== Former logos ==
Logo as KYQ FM from 2015-2019
