= CJAN-FM =

Radio station in Asbestos, Quebec

Coordinates: 45°45′06″N 71°56′35″W

Val-des-Sources, Quebec; Canada
- Frequency: 99.3 MHz
- Branding: FM 99.3

Programming
- Format: Full service

Ownership
- Owner: Coopérative Radio Web Média des Sources

History
- First air date: 1972
- Former frequencies: 1340 kHz (1972–2002)

Technical information
- Class: B1
- ERP: 11.1 kW
- HAAT: 78 metres (256 ft)

Links
- Webcast: Listen Live
- Website: www.fm993.ca

CJAN-FM is a Canadian radio station, which airs at 99.3 FM in Val-des-Sources, Quebec. The station, branded as FM 99.3, is a commercial broadcasting radio with local talk and variety music programming.

CJAN originally began broadcasting on the AM dial in 1972, until it moved to its current FM frequency in 2002.
