= Saint-Samuel, Quebec =

Saint-Samuel
- Municipality

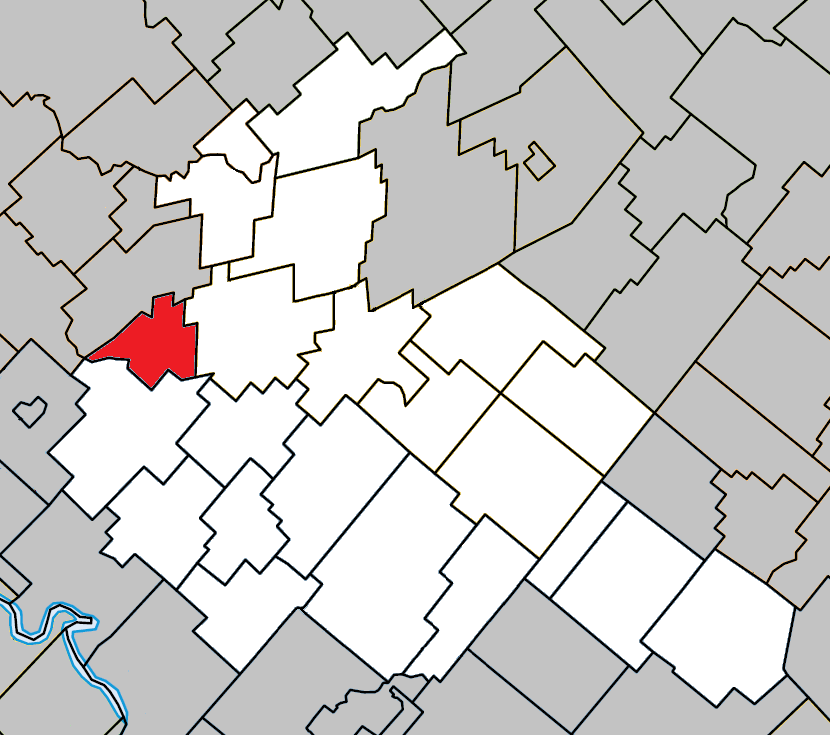
- Location within Arthabaska RCM.

- Location in southern Quebec.
- Coordinates: 46°04′N 72°13′W
- Country: Canada
- Province: Quebec
- Region: Centre-du-Québec
- RCM: Arthabaska
- Constituted: March 9, 1878

Government
  - Mayor: Malika Ali-Morrissette
  - Federal riding: Richmond—Arthabaska—des-Sources
  - Prov. riding: Drummond–Bois-Francs

Area
  - Total: 44.40 km^{2} (17.14 sq mi)
  - Land: 43.36 km^{2} (16.74 sq mi)

Population (2011)
  - Total: 743
  - Density: 17.1/km^{2} (44/sq mi)
  - Pop 2006-2011: ▲10.4%
- Time zone: UTC−5 (EST)
  - Summer (DST): UTC−4 (EDT)
- Postal code(s): G0Z 1G0
- Area code: 819
- Website: www.saint-samuel.ca

Saint-Samuel (French pronunciation: [sɛ̃ samɥɛl]) is a municipality located in the Centre-du-Québec region of Quebec, Canada.
