= Chesterville, Quebec =

Chesterville
- Municipality
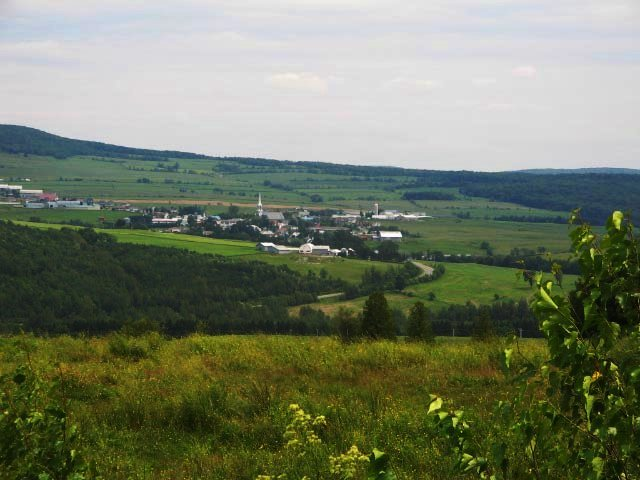
- Chesterville in 2009

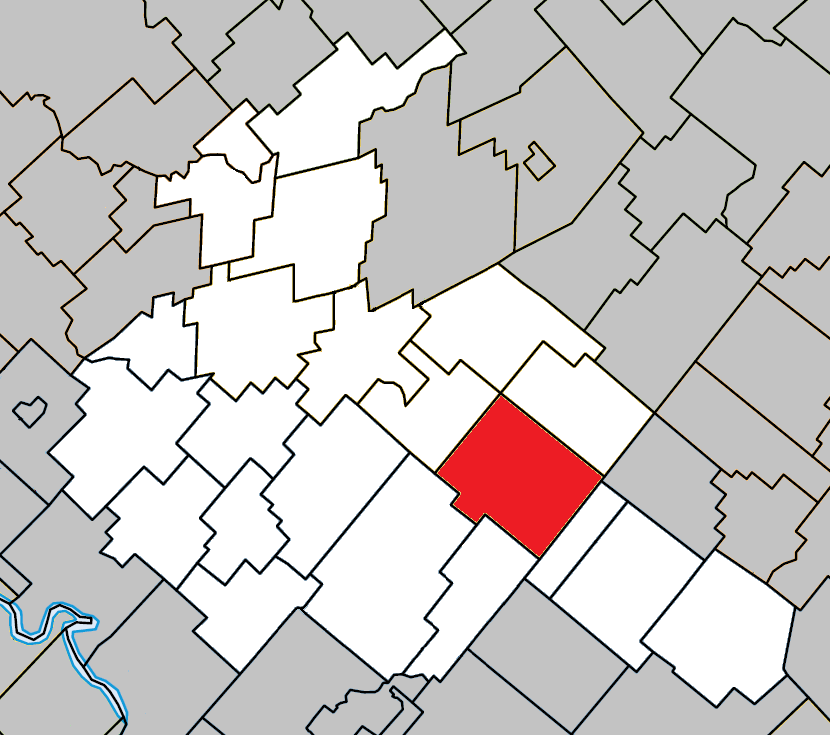
- Location within Arthabaska RCM.

- Location in southern Quebec.
- Coordinates: 45°58′N 71°49′W
- Country: Canada
- Province: Quebec
- Region: Centre-du-Québec
- RCM: Arthabaska
- Settled: 1835-1849
- Constituted: December 18, 1982

Government
  - Mayor: Vincent Desrochers
  - Federal riding: Richmond—Arthabaska—des-Sources
  - Prov. riding: Drummond–Bois-Francs

Area
  - Total: 117.00 km^{2} (45.17 sq mi)
  - Land: 116.72 km^{2} (45.07 sq mi)

Population (2021)
  - Total: 877
  - Density: 7.5/km^{2} (19/sq mi)
  - Pop 2016-2021: ▼4.9%
  - Dwellings: 422
- Time zone: UTC−5 (EST)
  - Summer (DST): UTC−4 (EDT)
- Postal code(s): G0P 1J0
- Area code: 819
- Highways: R-161
- Website: www.chesterville.net

Chesterville (French pronunciation: [tʃɛstɚvil, tʃɛstœʁ-]) is a municipality in the Arthabaska district of the Centre-du-Québec (Bois-Francs) region of Quebec, on Route 161 approximately 130 kilometres (81 mi) northeast of Montreal.

== History ==
The first settlers to the area arrived in 1835, but colonization actually began in spring 1849 with the establishment of a Catholic parish.

== Geography ==
The town's mountainous terrain in the heart of the Canadian Appalachians has earned it the nickname of "Quebec's little Switzerland," and boasts a picturesque location adjacent to the northern Nicolet river.

== Demographics ==
The principal source of income in Chesterville is agriculture and forest exploitation.

== Attractions ==
The free annual Symposium L'Accueil des Grands Peintres (art symposium) attracts many art lovers and features exhibits, artist conferences, workshops, local fare, and other cultural activities.

«Clairière - Art et Nature» is a 2 km forest path and natural amphitheatre dedicated to Professional site specific visual arts and musical concerts. Annual week-ends events are presented in August and September; they are open to the public.
