= Thetford Mines =

- City
- City of Thetford Mines; Ville de Thetford Mines
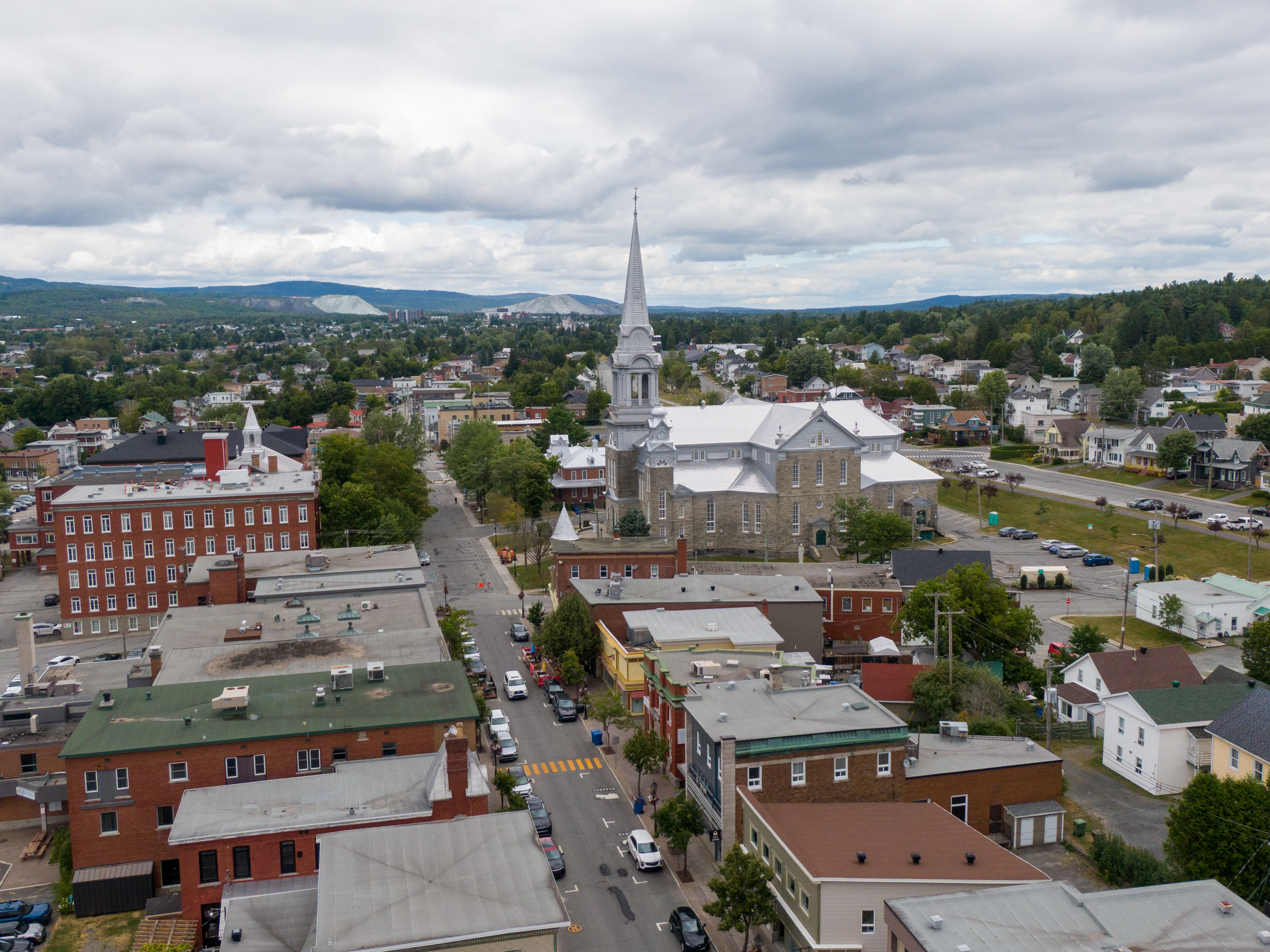
- Thetford Mines in 2025

- Coat of arms
- Motto: Fervet Opus (Latin) "Hard Work Prevails"
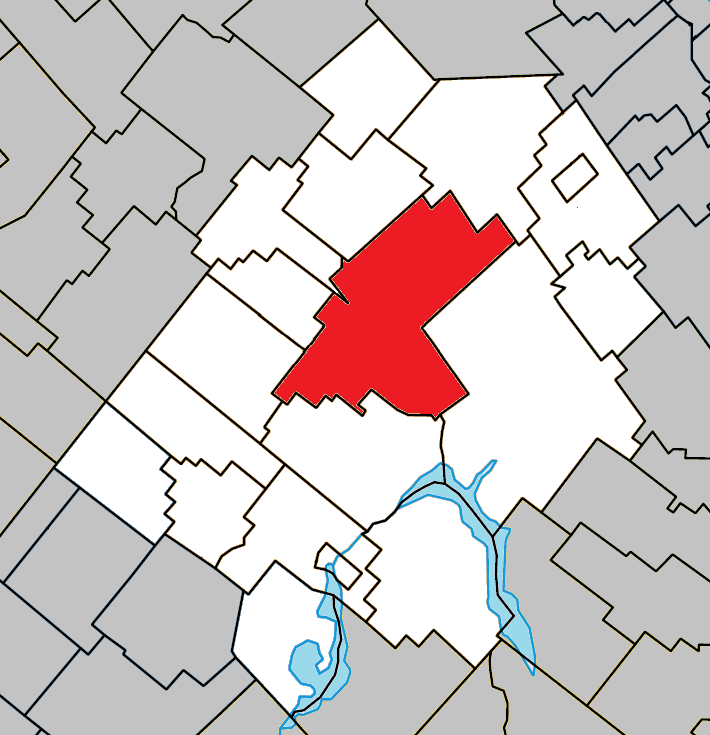
- Location within Les Appalaches RCM

- Location in province of Quebec
- Coordinates: 46°06′N 71°18′W
- Country: Canada
- Province: Quebec
- Region: Chaudière-Appalaches
- RCM: Les Appalaches
- Founded: 1876
- Constituted: October 17, 2001

Government
  - Mayor: Marc-Alexandre Brousseau
  - Federal riding: Mégantic—L'Érable—Lotbinière
  - Prov. riding: Lotbinière-Frontenac

Area
  - City: 227.70 km^{2} (87.92 sq mi)
  - Land: 225.97 km^{2} (87.25 sq mi)
  - Urban: 17.43 km^{2} (6.73 sq mi)
  - Metro: 405.92 km^{2} (156.73 sq mi)

Population (2021)
  - City: 26,072
  - Density: 115.4/km^{2} (299/sq mi)
  - Urban: 20,312
  - Urban density: 1,165.3/km^{2} (3,018/sq mi)
  - Metro: 28,287
  - Metro density: 69.7/km^{2} (181/sq mi)
  - Pop 2016–2021: ▲2.6%
  - Dwellings: 13,059
- Demonym(s): Thetfordois, Thetfordoises (Fr); Thetforder (EN)
- Time zone: UTC−5 (EST)
  - Summer (DST): UTC−4 (EDT)
- Postal code(s): G6G & G6H
- Area codes: 418 and 581
- Highways: R-112; R-267; R-269; R-271
- Geocode: 24 31084
- Website: www.villethetford.ca

Thetford Mines (French pronunciation: [tɛtfɚd majnz, -fœʁd -]; Canada 2021 Census population 26,072) is a city in south-central Quebec, Canada. It is the seat of Les Appalaches Regional County Municipality. The city is located in the Appalachian Mountains, 187 km east-northeast of Montreal and 79 km south of Quebec City. It is known mostly as the asbestos capital of Canada.

== History ==
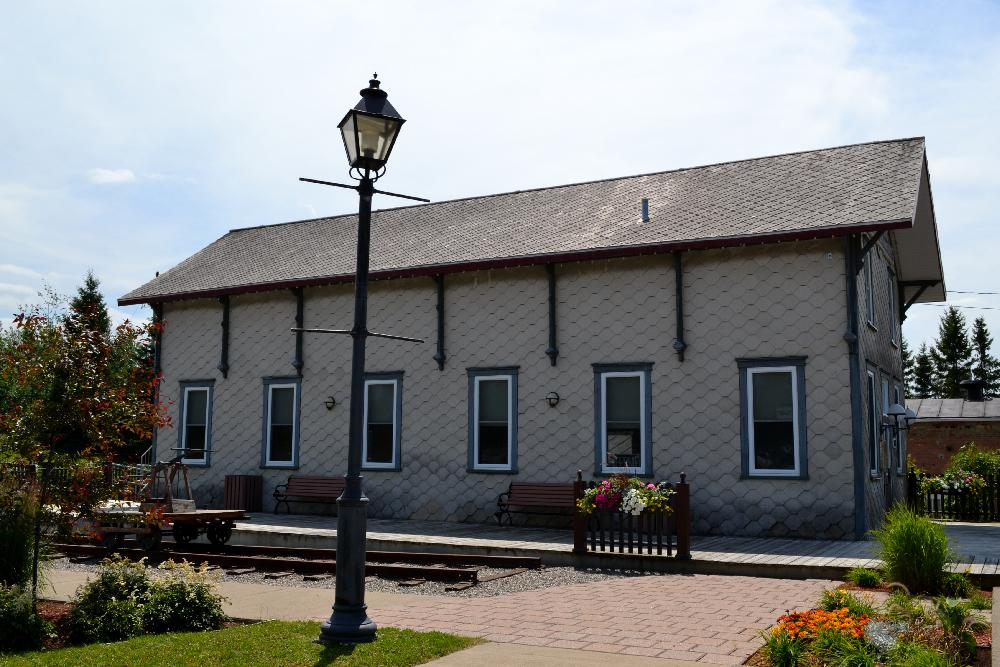
First railway station in the township of Thetford was constructed in 1878. Housing today the local Mine Museum, it is the oldest surviving building of Thetford Mines.

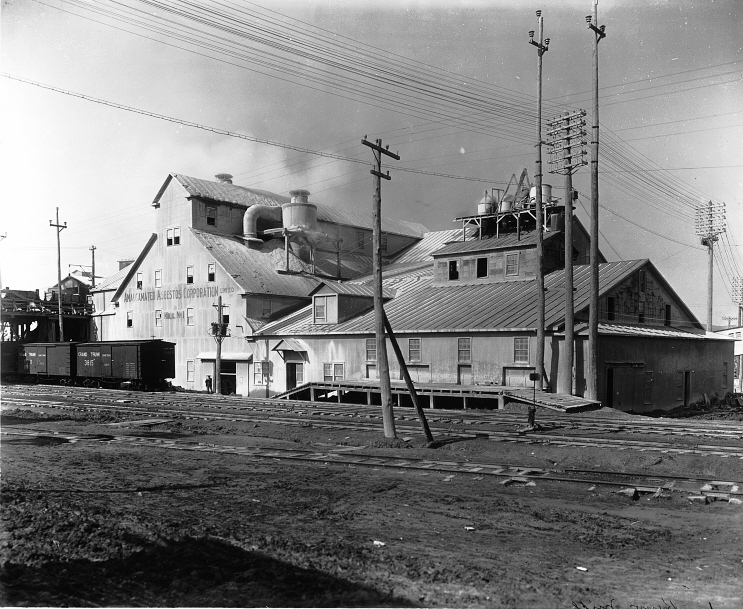
King's Mill, Amalgamated Asbestos Corp. Ltd, Thetford Mines, QC, in 1909.

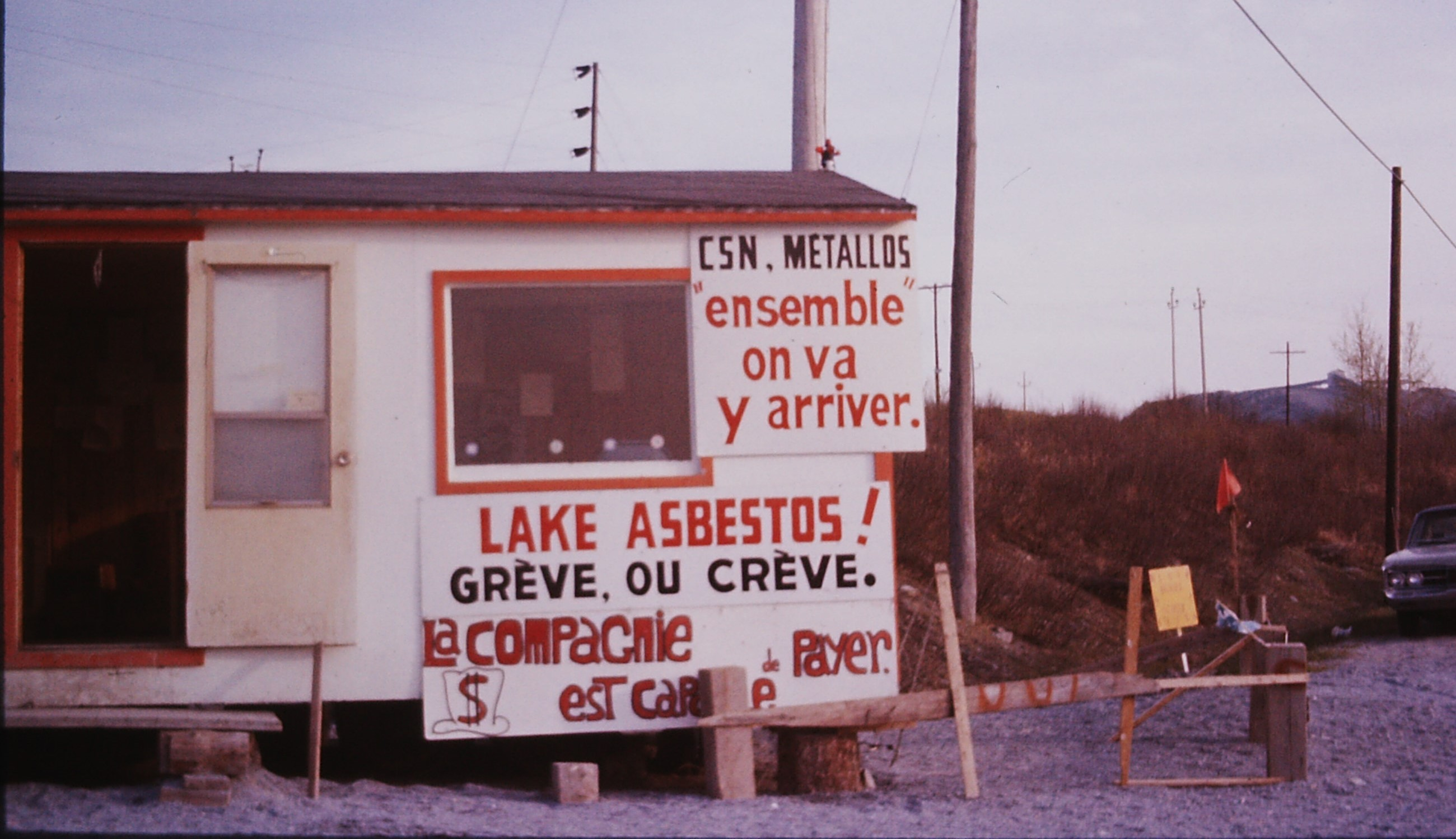
Strikes in spring 1975 at Asbestos (Quebec)

Before European colonization, the Abenaki inhabited the Thetford Mines region. A village was founded in 1876 after the discovery of large asbestos deposits in the area. The village incorporated as Kingsville (named after William King, an important mine owner) in 1892. A few years later, in 1905, Kingsville was renamed after the Township of Thetford in which it was founded, which was named after the town of Thetford in Norfolk, England.

During the 20th century, Thetford Mines became a hub for one of the world's largest asbestos-producing regions. back then being called "Asbestos Capital of the World" and the "City of White Gold". In the boom times, there were seven mines operating in the area, employing 4,000 workers. In 1949 and in 1975, asbestos miners in Asbestos and Thetford Mines began strikes each lasting for almost five months which were the most violent labor conflicts in the history of Quebec.

In 2001 the city expanded to its current boundaries, incorporating the nearby towns of Black Lake, Robertsonville, Pontbriand and Thetford-Sud.

When Canada banned the use of asbestos in schools and homes, after using it for years as insulation, the mines of Thetford Mines largely exported their asbestos to areas such as southeast Asia, the Middle East, and South and Central America. However, in 2012, the city's last mine closed and Thetford Mines has developed other sectors, namely manufacturing.

The city of Thetford Mines is the seat of the judicial district of Frontenac.

== Geography ==
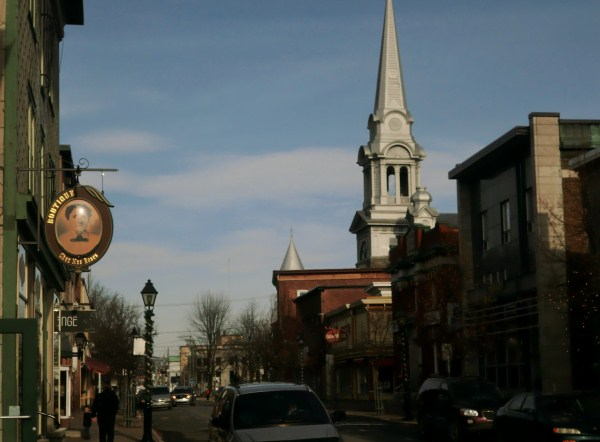

=== Climate ===
The Köppen–Geiger climate classification system classifies its climate as humid continental (Dfb). Winters are very cold and snowy, while summers are warm and rainy when it receives more precipitation.

Climate data for Thetford Mines, Quebec, 1981–2010 normals
Month	Jan	Feb	Mar	Apr	May	Jun	Jul	Aug	Sep	Oct	Nov	Dec	Year
Record high °C (°F)	14.0 (57.2)	15.0 (59.0)	19.0 (66.2)	29.0 (84.2)	31.1 (88.0)	32.0 (89.6)	33.0 (91.4)	32.8 (91.0)	32.0 (89.6)	26.1 (79.0)	20.5 (68.9)	15.0 (59.0)	33.0 (91.4)
Mean daily maximum °C (°F)	−7.3 (18.9)	−5.1 (22.8)	0.4 (32.7)	8.4 (47.1)	16.3 (61.3)	21.3 (70.3)	23.5 (74.3)	22.5 (72.5)	17.8 (64.0)	10.5 (50.9)	3.4 (38.1)	−3.8 (25.2)	9.0 (48.2)
Daily mean °C (°F)	−11.6 (11.1)	−9.5 (14.9)	−4.0 (24.8)	3.9 (39.0)	11.1 (52.0)	16.1 (61.0)	18.6 (65.5)	17.6 (63.7)	13.2 (55.8)	6.5 (43.7)	0.1 (32.2)	−7.4 (18.7)	4.6 (40.3)
Mean daily minimum °C (°F)	−15.9 (3.4)	−13.8 (7.2)	−8.4 (16.9)	−0.6 (30.9)	5.8 (42.4)	10.9 (51.6)	13.7 (56.7)	12.8 (55.0)	8.5 (47.3)	2.6 (36.7)	−3.2 (26.2)	−11 (12)	0.1 (32.2)
Record low °C (°F)	−36 (−33)	−35 (−31)	−34 (−29)	−19 (−2)	−8.3 (17.1)	−1.5 (29.3)	3.0 (37.4)	1.0 (33.8)	−6 (21)	−11 (12)	−22.2 (−8.0)	−34 (−29)	−36 (−33)
Average precipitation mm (inches)	107.9 (4.25)	86.5 (3.41)	89.1 (3.51)	88.3 (3.48)	105.0 (4.13)	130.0 (5.12)	133.3 (5.25)	135.3 (5.33)	100.2 (3.94)	112.2 (4.42)	104.6 (4.12)	117.2 (4.61)	1,309.6 (51.56)
Average rainfall mm (inches)	25.9 (1.02)	15.5 (0.61)	27.0 (1.06)	65.7 (2.59)	102.9 (4.05)	130.0 (5.12)	133.3 (5.25)	135.3 (5.33)	100.1 (3.94)	105.6 (4.16)	70.6 (2.78)	33.6 (1.32)	945.5 (37.22)
Average snowfall cm (inches)	82.1 (32.3)	71.0 (28.0)	62.0 (24.4)	23.1 (9.1)	2.0 (0.8)	0.0 (0.0)	0.0 (0.0)	0.0 (0.0)	0.0 (0.0)	6.6 (2.6)	34.0 (13.4)	83.6 (32.9)	364.5 (143.5)
Average extreme snow depth cm (inches)	52 (20)	70 (28)	76 (30)	32 (13)	0 (0)	0 (0)	0 (0)	0 (0)	0 (0)	0 (0)	4 (1.6)	26 (10)	76 (30)
Average precipitation days (≥ 0.2mm)	17.9	14.7	14.3	13.6	15.2	15.6	16.3	14.1	13.4	16.2	17.2	18.6	186.9
Average rainy days (≥ 0.2mm)	3.0	2.5	2.0	11.0	15.1	15.6	16.3	14.1	13.4	15.4	11.0	4.6	126.9
Average snowy days (≥ 0.2 cm)	16.0	13.4	11.1	5.0	0.47	0.0	0.0	0.0	0.04	1.8	8.1	15.6	71.4
Source: ECCC

== Demographics ==
In the 2021 Census of Population conducted by Statistics Canada, Thetford Mines had a population of 26,072 living in 12,216 of its 13,059 total private dwellings, a change of 2.6% from its 2016 population of 25,403. With a land area of 225.97 km^{2} (87.25 sq mi), it had a population density of 115.4/km^{2} (298.8/sq mi) in 2021.

== Attractions ==
=== Winter ===
Given the abundance of snow for several months in winter, it is a popular area for snowmobiling and four-wheel drive vehicles as well as for downhill and cross-country skiing.

The city is home to the minor-pro ice hockey team the Thetford Mines Assurancia, who are members of the Ligue Nord-Américaine de Hockey (LNAH). They play home games at Centre Mario Gosselin. Thetford Mines is the only city to have hosted an LNAH team in every season since the league's 1996 inception. The city has ringette and hockey organisations for the youth, and there are yearly tournaments for ringette and minor Hockey players, as well as old-timers hockey tournaments.

Thetford Mines was chosen as a top-five finalist for Kraft Hockeyville for 2009 on the February 21, 2009 Hockey Night In Canada "Hockey Day In Canada" special.

=== Spring ===
Spring is maple syrup producing time in the area. The numerous stands of maple trees in the region makes it one of the top maple syrup producing regions in the world. In March and early April, local citizens often make a ritual outing to one of the area's sugar camps (or cabanes à sucre) for sugaring off parties where maple syrup, reduced and thickened by slow boiling, is poured over fresh snow to create a delightful taffy.

=== Summer ===
Summer brings a host of other outdoor activities. An abundance of lakes and rivers provide plenty of opportunities for outdoor gatherings and cool refreshment. A series of summer festivals add to the enjoyment of the season, with sporting events, concerts and fireworks.

=== Autumn ===
The same maples that produce syrup in spring, provide brilliant displays of colour in autumn.

== Media ==
Two radio stations, CFJO ("O97,3") and CKLD ("Passion-Rock 105,5") serve Thetford Mines. Both stations air programming produced partially in Thetford Mines and partially in Victoriaville.

== Notable people ==
- Bob Fillion (1920–2015), late hockey player with the Montreal Canadiens
- Raymond Setlakwe (1928–2021), entrepreneur, lawyer, and former Quebec senator
- Armand Vaillancourt (born 1929), Canadian sculptor, painter and performance artist
- Michel Louvain (1937–2021), French Canadian singer and television presenter
- Roch Thériault (1947–2011), cult leader and polygamist known for his totalitarian leadership of the Ant Hill Kids.
- Janel Gauthier (b. 1950), psychologist
- Michaëlle Jean (b. 1957), former Governor General of Canada and current Secretary-General of La Francophonie.
- Jean-François Lisée (b. 1958), former leader of the Parti Québécois, former Leader of the Opposition in Quebec, and former member of the National Assembly of Quebec for the electoral district of Rosemont
- Daniel Poudrier (b. 1964), retired hockey player, city councillor
- Mario Gosselin (b. 1963), hockey player
- Patrice Tardif (b. 1970), hockey player, formerly in the NHL
- Simon Gamache (b. 1981), hockey player, formerly in the NHL
- John Mervin Nooth (1737–1828), physician, army officer, scientist, and superintendent general of hospitals in Lower Canada.
- Andrew Stuart Johnson (1848–1926) prominent farmer, lumber merchant, mining company founder and political figure in Quebec.

== Gallery ==
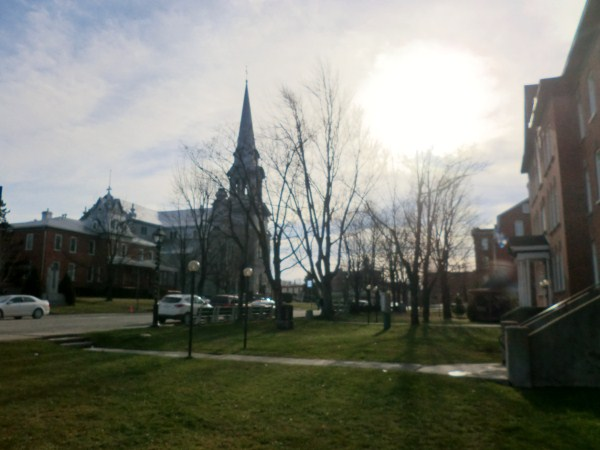

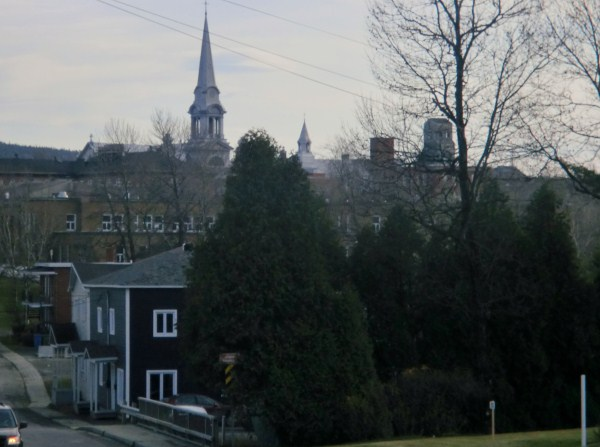

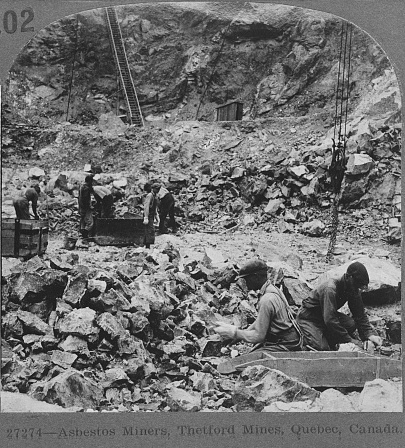
Asbestos miners in Thetford Mines in the 1920s
