= Saint-Valère =

- Municipality
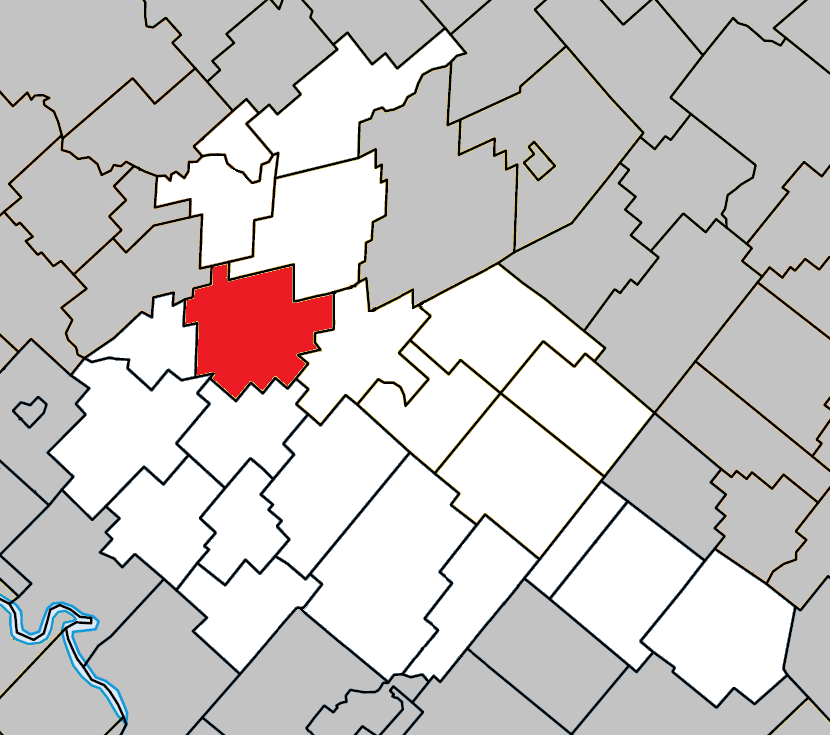
- Location within Arthabaska RCM.

- Location in southern Quebec.
- Coordinates: 46°04′N 72°06′W
- Country: Canada
- Province: Quebec
- Region: Centre-du-Québec
- RCM: Arthabaska
- Constituted: January 1, 1862

Government
  - Mayor: Marcel Normand
  - Federal riding: Richmond—Arthabaska—des-Sources
  - Prov. riding: Arthabaska–L'Érable

Area
  - Total: 108.80 km^{2} (42.01 sq mi)
  - Land: 108.14 km^{2} (41.75 sq mi)

Population (2021)
  - Total: 1,118
  - Density: 11/km^{2} (28/sq mi)
  - Pop 2016-2021: ▼5.9%
- Time zone: UTC−5 (EST)
  - Summer (DST): UTC−4 (EDT)
- Postal code(s): G0P 1M0
- Area code: 819
- Highways A-955: R-122; R-161; R-261
- Website: www.msvalere.qc.ca

Saint-Valère is a municipality located in the Centre-du-Québec region of Quebec, Canada. its population is 1,118 as of the 2021 census.
