= Victoriaville =

- Town
- Ville de Victoriaville
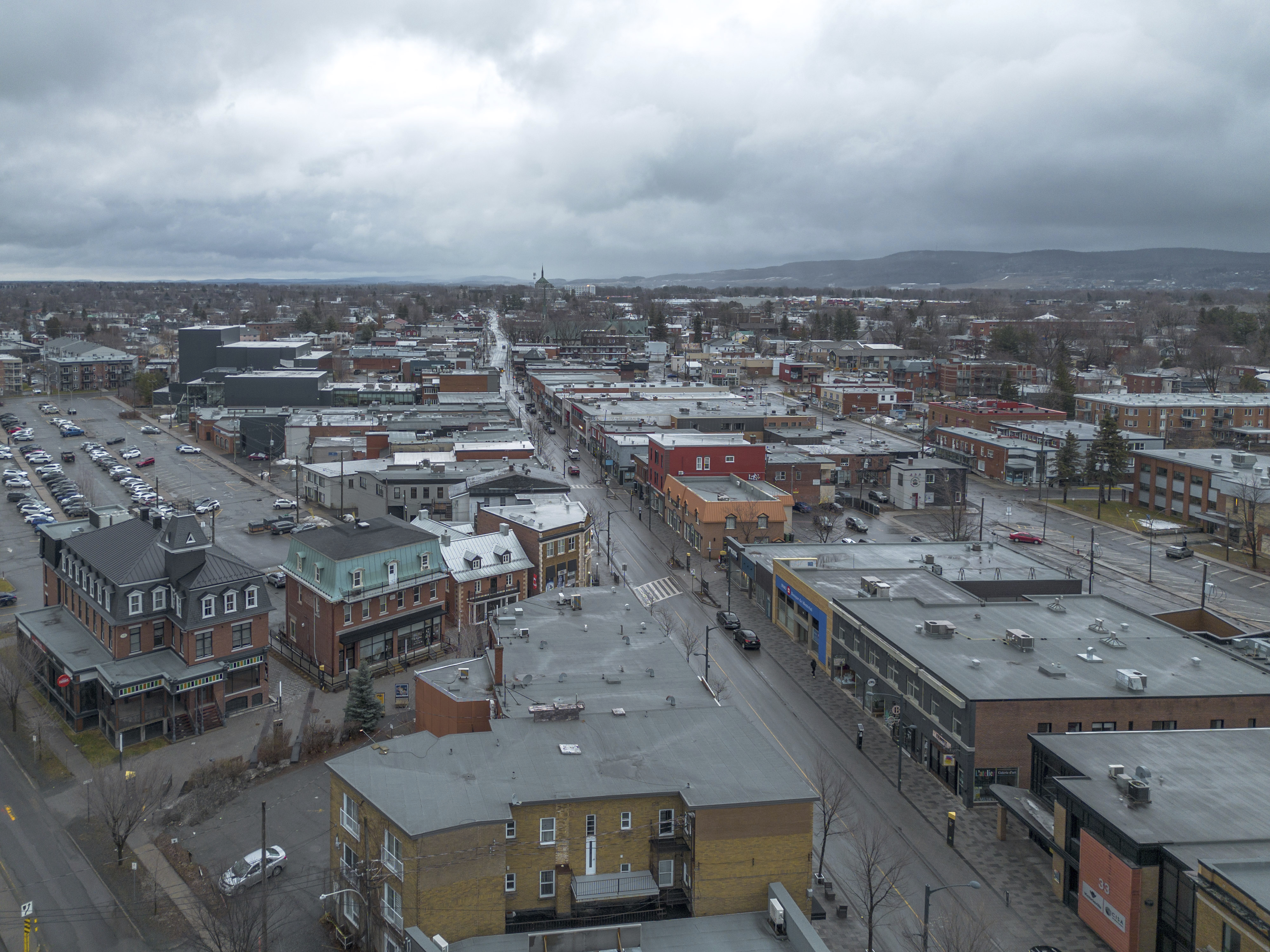
- Victoriaville in 2026

- Logo
- Motto: Santé urbaine
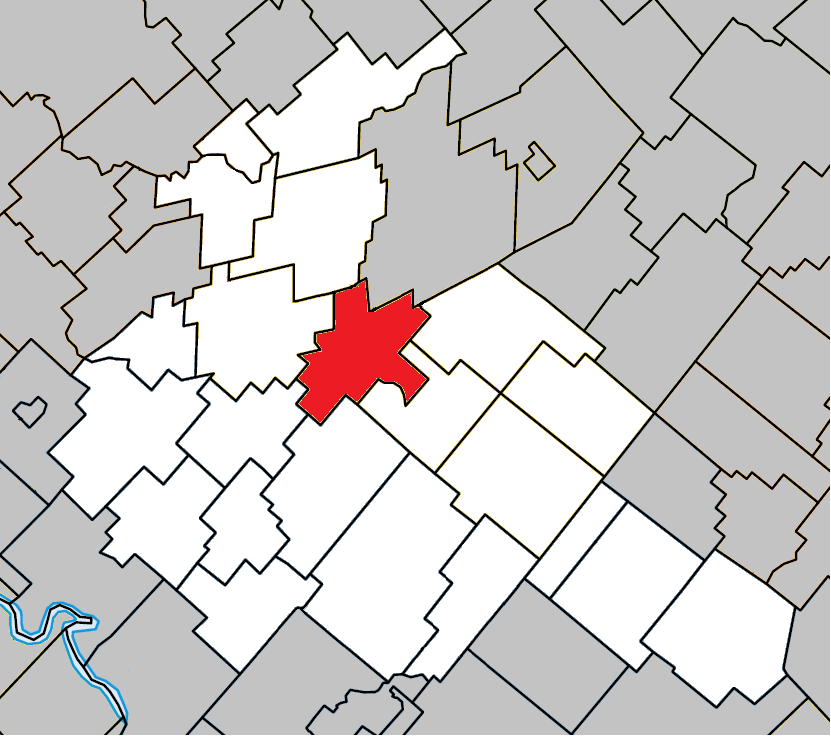
- Location within Arthabaska RCM.

- Location in southern Quebec.
- Coordinates: 46°03′N 71°58′W
- Country: Canada
- Province: Quebec
- Region: Centre-du-Québec
- RCM: Arthabaska
- Constituted: June 23, 1993

Government
  - Mayor: Vincent Bourassa
  - Federal riding: Richmond—Arthabaska—des-Sources
  - Prov. riding: Arthabaska–L'Érable

Area
  - Town: 86.20 km^{2} (33.28 sq mi)
  - Land: 84.33 km^{2} (32.56 sq mi)
  - Urban: 35.27 km^{2} (13.62 sq mi)
  - Metro: 378.10 km^{2} (145.99 sq mi)
- Elevation: 148 m (486 ft)

Population (2021)
  - Town: 47,760
  - Density: 566.4/km^{2} (1,467/sq mi)
  - Urban: 46,322
  - Urban density: 1,313.4/km^{2} (3,402/sq mi)
  - Metro: 52,936
  - Metro density: 140/km^{2} (360/sq mi)
  - Pop 2016-2021: ▲3.5%
  - Dwellings: 23,106
- Time zone: UTC−5 (EST)
  - Summer (DST): UTC−4 (EDT)
- Postal code(s): G6P to G6T
- Area code: 819
- Highways: R-116; R-122; R-161; R-162; R-263
- Website: www.victoriaville.ca

Victoriaville (French pronunciation: [viktɔʁjavil]) is a town in south-central Quebec, Canada, on the Nicolet River. Victoriaville is the seat of Arthabaska Regional County Municipality and a part of the Centre-du-Québec (Bois-Francs) region. It is formed by the 1993 merger of Arthabaska, Saint-Victoire-d'Arthabaska and Victoriaville, the name of the last being used for the merged town.

Victoriaville's size and location have earned it the title Capitale des Bois-Francs, referring to the Bois-Francs region of the province. Victoriaville produces numerous hardwood products, including furniture, caskets, and hockey sticks. The town was home to the famous Victoriaville hockey company.

== History ==
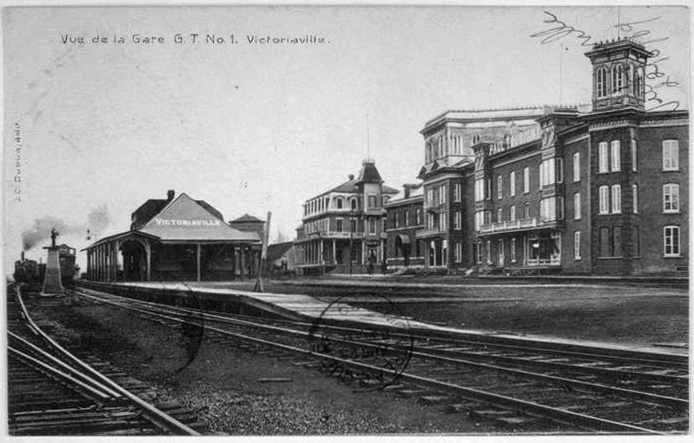
Victoriaville railway station in 1909

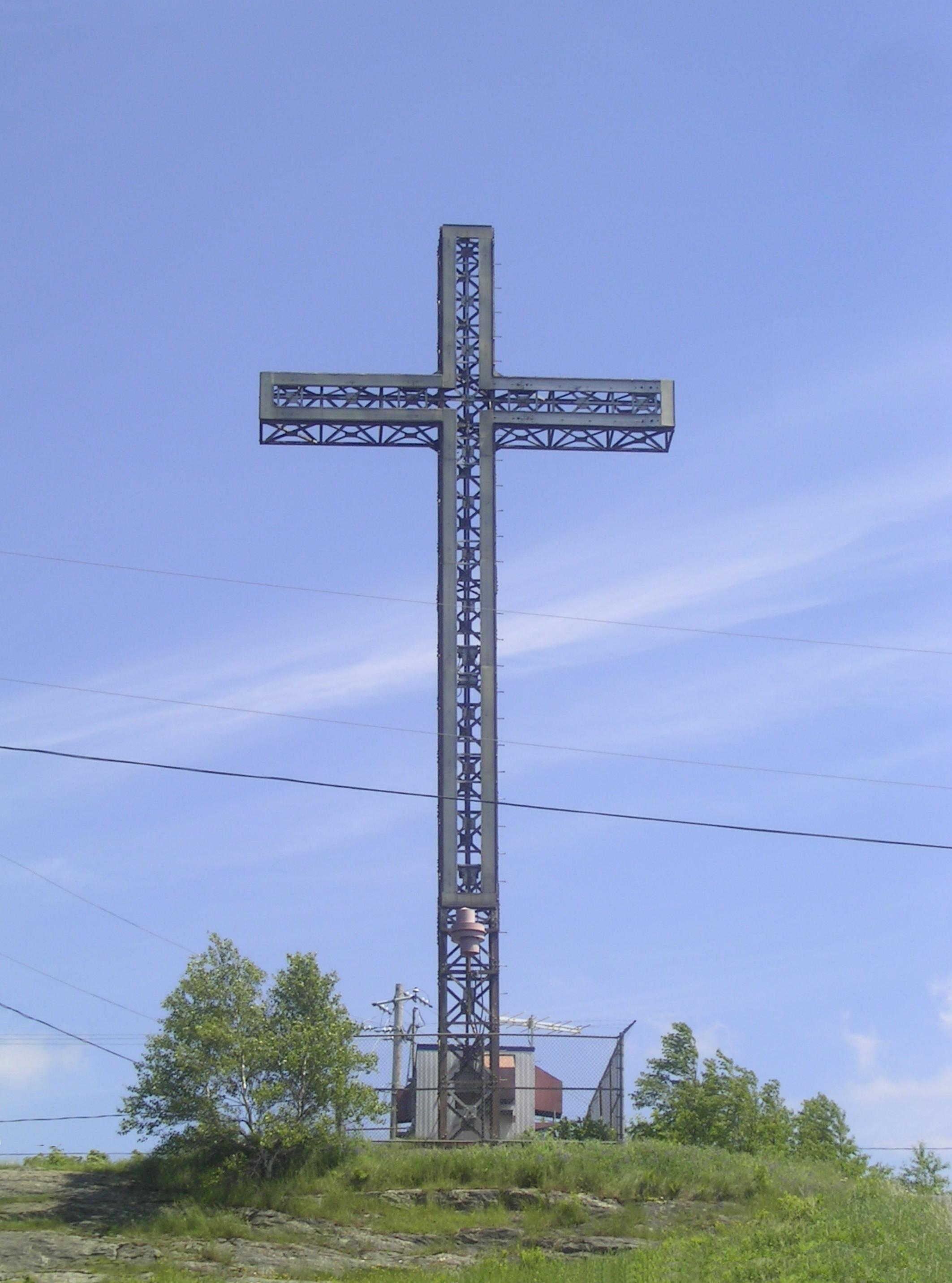
Cross on top of Mount Arthabaska remade in 1929.

The Victoriaville area was known to the native Abenaki peoples as Arthabaska or Awabaska, meaning "place of bulrushes and reeds". The area was first claimed in 1802 by a fur trader named John Gregory; the first settlers began arriving several decades later, beginning around 1825. Early colonists from the banks of the Saint Lawrence River arrived slowly, blazing trails as they went; the first provincial road would be built in 1844. The parish of Saint-Christophe d'Arthabaska was established in 1851, an event that many see as marking the town's true foundation. In 1854 a train station was erected to serve the Grand Trunk Railway line from Richmond to Lévis, uniting the region with Montreal and Quebec City. The municipality of Victoriaville itself was created on May 8, 1861, named to honour Queen Victoria, the reigning monarch at the time. Victoriaville became a full-fledged town in 1890, having reached a population of 1,000.

Among the many milestones in the growth of Victoriaville are the establishment of a hospital, the Hôtel-Dieu d'Arthabaska, in 1931; the opening of a seminary, the Collège du Sacré-Cœur, in 1942; the creation of a school specialized in cabinet making and woodworking, the École Québécoise du Meuble et du Bois Ouvré (ÉQMBO), in 1965; and the inauguration of the Cégep de Victoriaville in the space previously occupied by the Collège du Sacré-Cœur, in 1969. Train service through Victoriaville was discontinued in 1960; the disused train tracks were eventually removed and the space was transformed into bicycle paths, forming the Parc Linéaire — with a "Vélogare" replacing the old station. In March 1941, the Royal Canadian Air Force (RCAF) established No. 3 Initial Training School, at the Collège du Sacré-Cœur. The RCAF school trained potential pilots and Navigators on common topics and divided the trainees into their trades. The RCAF school was closed in November 1944.

In June 1993, after a referendum on amalgamation, the municipalities of Sainte-Victoire-D'Arthabaska, Arthabaska and Victoriaville merged to form the town of Victoriaville. The aboriginal name "Arthabaska", unique and well-appreciated by residents, was retained in several ways, notably in the name of the regional county municipality and in the name of the highest (and only) mountain that overlooks the town; as well, in 2004, the section of Route 116 that passes through Victoriaville was renamed boulevard Arthabaska.

== Geography ==
=== Climate ===
Climate data for Victoriaville (1991−2020 normals, extremes 1949–present)
| Month | Jan | Feb | Mar | Apr | May | Jun | Jul | Aug | Sep | Oct | Nov | Dec | Year |
|---|---|---|---|---|---|---|---|---|---|---|---|---|---|
| Record high °C (°F) | 16.0 (60.8) | 14.0 (57.2) | 24.5 (76.1) | 30.0 (86.0) | 34.8 (94.6) | 34.5 (94.1) | 36.7 (98.1) | 34.0 (93.2) | 33.5 (92.3) | 27.6 (81.7) | 23.2 (73.8) | 16.7 (62.1) | 36.7 (98.1) |
| Mean daily maximum °C (°F) | −5.8 (21.6) | −4.2 (24.4) | 1.5 (34.7) | 9.8 (49.6) | 18.1 (64.6) | 22.9 (73.2) | 25.1 (77.2) | 24.2 (75.6) | 19.7 (67.5) | 12.2 (54.0) | 5.0 (41.0) | −2.1 (28.2) | 10.5 (50.9) |
| Daily mean °C (°F) | −10.8 (12.6) | −8.9 (16.0) | −3.5 (25.7) | 4.8 (40.6) | 12.2 (54.0) | 17.2 (63.0) | 19.4 (66.9) | 18.6 (65.5) | 14.5 (58.1) | 7.8 (46.0) | 1.2 (34.2) | −6.1 (21.0) | 5.5 (41.9) |
| Mean daily minimum °C (°F) | −15.3 (4.5) | −13.8 (7.2) | −8.2 (17.2) | −0.5 (31.1) | 6.4 (43.5) | 11.5 (52.7) | 14.3 (57.7) | 13.2 (55.8) | 9.0 (48.2) | 3.3 (37.9) | −2.9 (26.8) | −10.0 (14.0) | 0.6 (33.1) |
| Record low °C (°F) | −39.0 (−38.2) | −37.7 (−35.9) | −30.0 (−22.0) | −17.0 (1.4) | −7.2 (19.0) | −3.0 (26.6) | 2.9 (37.2) | 1.0 (33.8) | −6.0 (21.2) | −11.0 (12.2) | −25.0 (−13.0) | −34.0 (−29.2) | −39.0 (−38.2) |
| Average precipitation mm (inches) | 76.2 (3.00) | 66.5 (2.62) | 73.2 (2.88) | 84.2 (3.31) | 97.1 (3.82) | 116.7 (4.59) | 131.4 (5.17) | 108.3 (4.26) | 109.2 (4.30) | 115.2 (4.54) | 82.2 (3.24) | 89.9 (3.54) | 1,150.1 (45.28) |
| Average rainfall mm (inches) | 27.8 (1.09) | 18.0 (0.71) | 35.2 (1.39) | 71.9 (2.83) | 94.7 (3.73) | 116.7 (4.59) | 131.4 (5.17) | 108.3 (4.26) | 109.2 (4.30) | 112.2 (4.42) | 65.3 (2.57) | 38.9 (1.53) | 929.6 (36.60) |
| Average snowfall cm (inches) | 47.7 (18.8) | 47.1 (18.5) | 38.8 (15.3) | 13.9 (5.5) | 2.0 (0.8) | 0.0 (0.0) | 0.0 (0.0) | 0.0 (0.0) | 0.0 (0.0) | 2.6 (1.0) | 18.5 (7.3) | 49.6 (19.5) | 220.1 (86.7) |
| Average precipitation days (≥ 0.2 mm) | 15.2 | 12.7 | 12.4 | 13.2 | 13.6 | 14.4 | 15.1 | 12.9 | 12.2 | 14.8 | 14.4 | 16.0 | 166.7 |
| Average rainy days (≥ 0.2 mm) | 4.0 | 2.9 | 5.8 | 11.4 | 13.4 | 14.4 | 15.1 | 12.9 | 12.2 | 14.3 | 11.0 | 5.9 | 123.2 |
| Average snowy days (≥ 0.2 cm) | 12.6 | 10.6 | 7.8 | 3.4 | 0.35 | 0.0 | 0.0 | 0.0 | 0.0 | 0.81 | 5.0 | 12.1 | 52.7 |
| Mean monthly sunshine hours | 89.9 | 112.9 | 156.6 | 180.8 | 236.9 | 240.1 | 259.0 | 225.9 | 175.3 | 130.1 | 71.6 | 72.3 | 1,951.6 |
Source: Environment and Climate Change Canada (sun 1951–1980)

== Demographics ==
In the 2021 Census of Population conducted by Statistics Canada, Victoriaville had a population of 47,760 living in 21,864 of its 23,106 total private dwellings, a change of 3.5% from its 2016 population of 46,130. With a land area of 84.33 km^{2} (32.56 sq mi), it had a population density of 566.3/km^{2} (1,466.8/sq mi) in 2021.

Change in Population
| Year | Population | Variation (%) |
|---|---|---|
| 2021 | 47,760 | ▲3.5% |
| 2016 | 46,130 | ▲6.1% |
| 2011 | 43,462 | ▲7.4% |
| 2006 | 40,486 | ▲4.2% |
| 2001 | 38,841 | ▲1.7% |
| 1996 | 38,174 | - |

=== Language ===
As of the 2021 Census, 95.6% of the population reported their Mother Tongue as French, and 0.7% reported speaking English as their Mother Tongue. 27.4% of the population reported speaking both English and French, 71.9% spoke French only, and 0.2% spoke only English.

Mother Tongue (2021)
| Language | Population | Percentage (%) |
|---|---|---|
| English | 335 | 0.7% |
| French | 44,870 | 95.6% |
| Non-official language | 1,330 | 2.8% |

Knowledge of Official Languages (2021)
| Language | Population | Percentage (%) |
|---|---|---|
| English only | 80 | 0.2% |
| French only | 33,775 | 71.9% |
| Both English and French | 12,885 | 27.4% |
| Neither English nor French | 215 | 0.5% |

== Economy ==
Investment in the industrial park buoyed the town and spurred residential and commercial development. It is the home of a Lactantia dairy factory, two shopping malls - "La Grande Place des Bois-Francs" and "Le Carrefour des Bois-Francs"(which was renamed to "le Centre de Victoriaville"), the Cégep de Victoriaville, and a downtown core/shopping area on Rue Notre-Dame. Victoriaville Airport, located at the town's northern limits close to Route 116, is a regional airport that receives business flights and light private planes.

Textiles, wood products and furniture products have long been the heart of the economy, but their presence have declined in the past years. A large Lactantia factory producing butter, cheeses and other dairy products has been a major employer for decades. Water filtered from Réservoir Beaudet is said to be some of the best water worldwide.

== Arts and culture ==
Many festivals are held throughout the year including the Week-end En Blues series of concerts, the Festival International de Musique Actuelle de Victoriaville (FIMAV) in the spring, and the Exposition Agricole in the summer.

The Carré 150 is Victoriaville's principal venue for professional performing and visual artists. Each year, the programme includes over 250 performances in music, theatre, comedy, dance, repertory films and more. The complex comprises four spaces: a large Italian-style auditorium with 855 seats, a black box cabaret with 260 seats or 500 standing for general admission, a rehearsal studio and a contemporary art exhibition centre, the Centre d'art Jacques-et-Michel-Auger. The Grand foyer Victoriaville-et-sa-région, remarkable for its vast windows, hosts numerous cocktail parties, often extending into the Lounge Laurier or the Terrasse Daniel-Gaudreau.

== Attractions ==
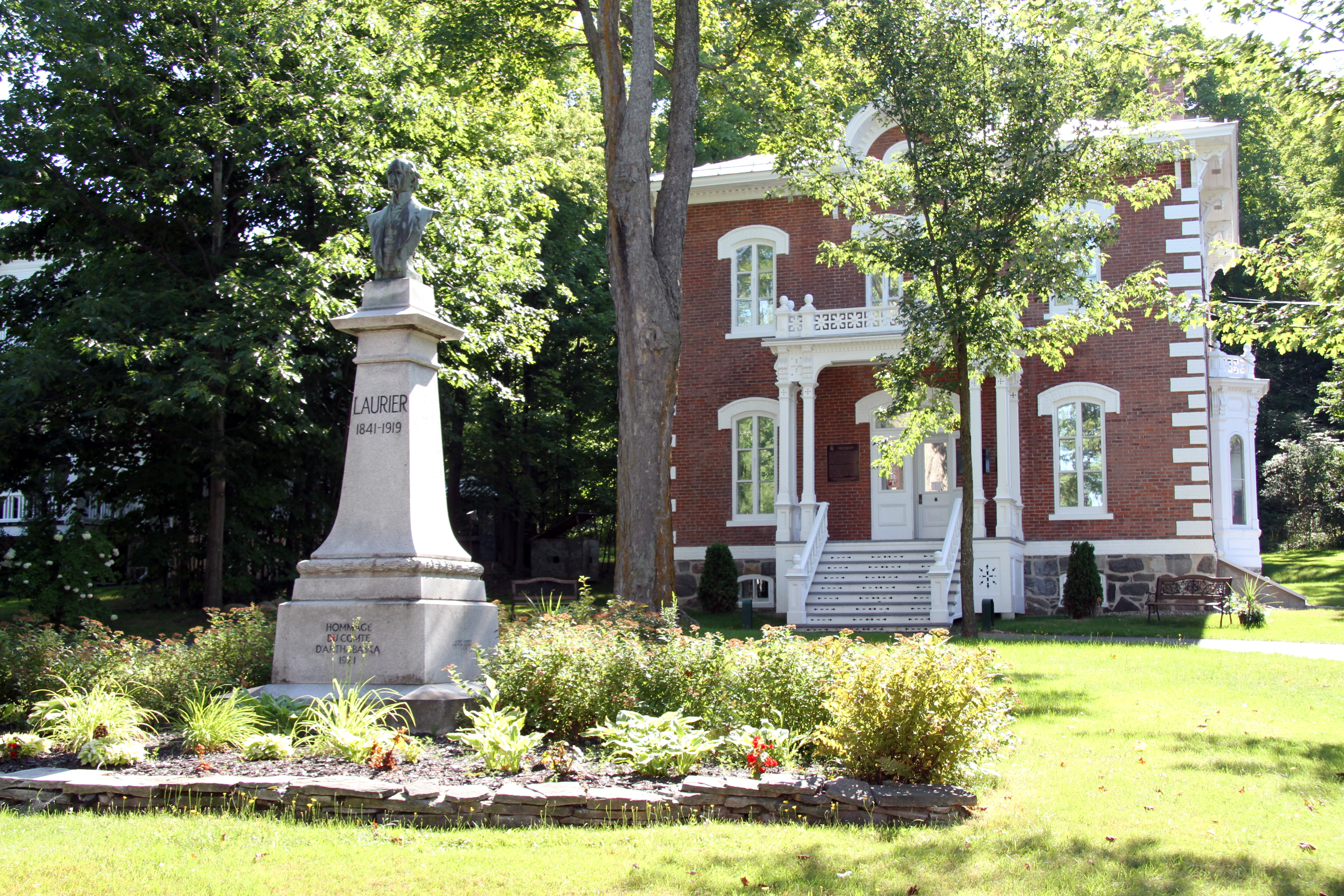
Sir Wilfrid Laurier Museum

The Parc-Linéaire Des Bois-Francs bike trail traverses Victoriaville. There are many paths for cyclists throughout the town, including ones leading to the summit of Mont Arthabaska, at the southern limits of the town. The Laurier Museum is located in the home of former Prime Minister Sir Wilfrid Laurier, which is designated Wilfrid Laurier House National Historic Site.

== Sports ==
Jean Béliveau (August 31, 1931 – December 2, 2014), ten-time Stanley Cup winner with the Montreal Canadiens, was raised in Victoriaville after moving there from Trois-Rivières at a young age.

The town is currently home to the Victoriaville Tigres junior hockey team, who have played in the QMJHL since 1987. They play at the Colisée Desjardins.

== Government ==
The current mayor of Victoriaville is Vincent Bourassa who was elected as mayor of Victoriaville in the 2025 mayoral election.

Victoriaville is the seat of the judicial district of Arthabaska.

== Media ==
The weekly newspaper La Nouvelle-Union, is a major source of the town's local news, since national news organisations tend to run larger stories affecting larger areas or cities.

Two radio stations, CFJO ("O97.3") and CFDA ("Passion-Rock 101.9") serve Victoriaville. Both stations air programming produced partially in Victoriaville and partially in Thetford Mines. CKYQ ("KYQ FM"), a station licensed to Plessisville, also has a studio and a transmitter in Victoriaville.

== Notable people ==
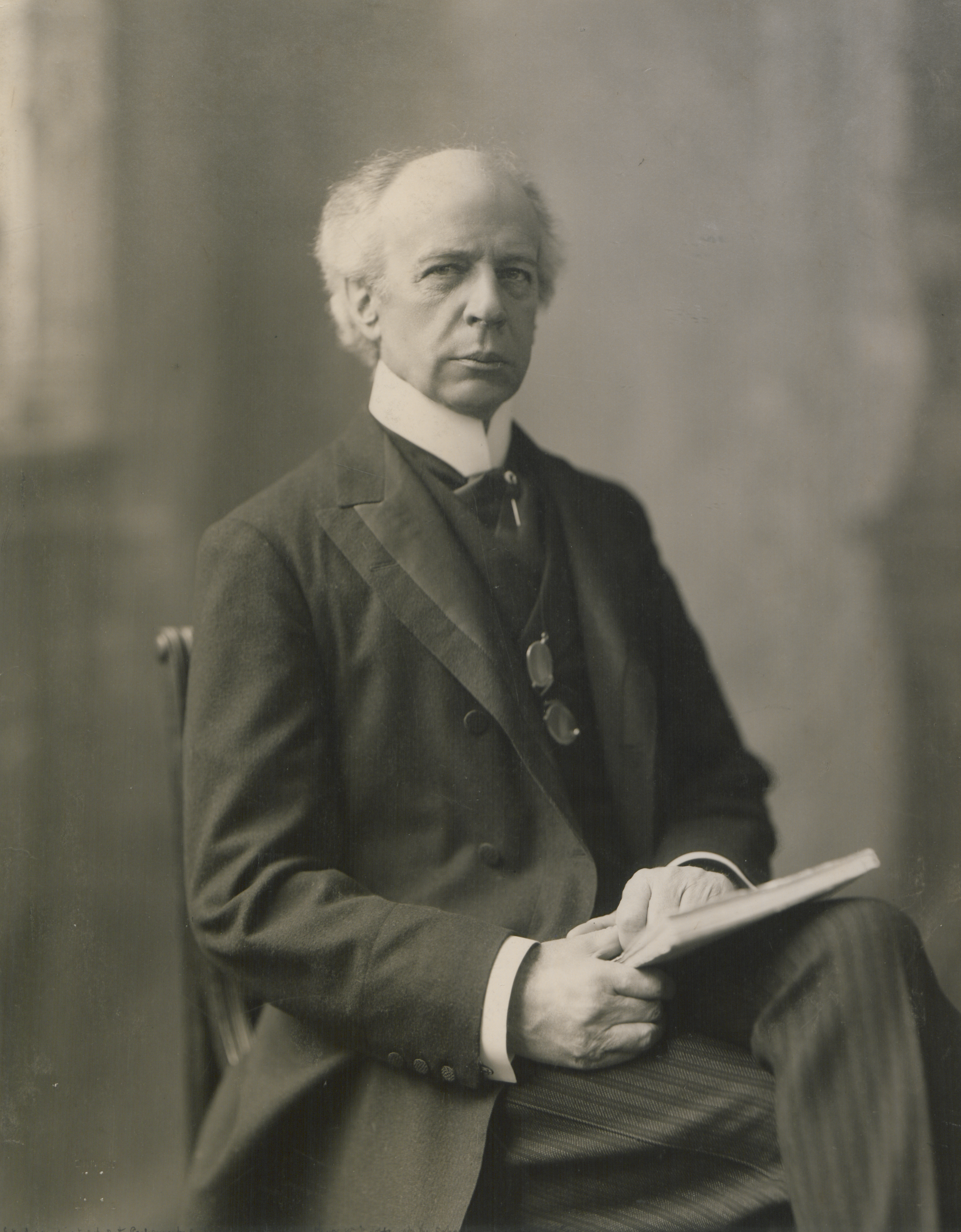
Sir Wilfrid Laurier

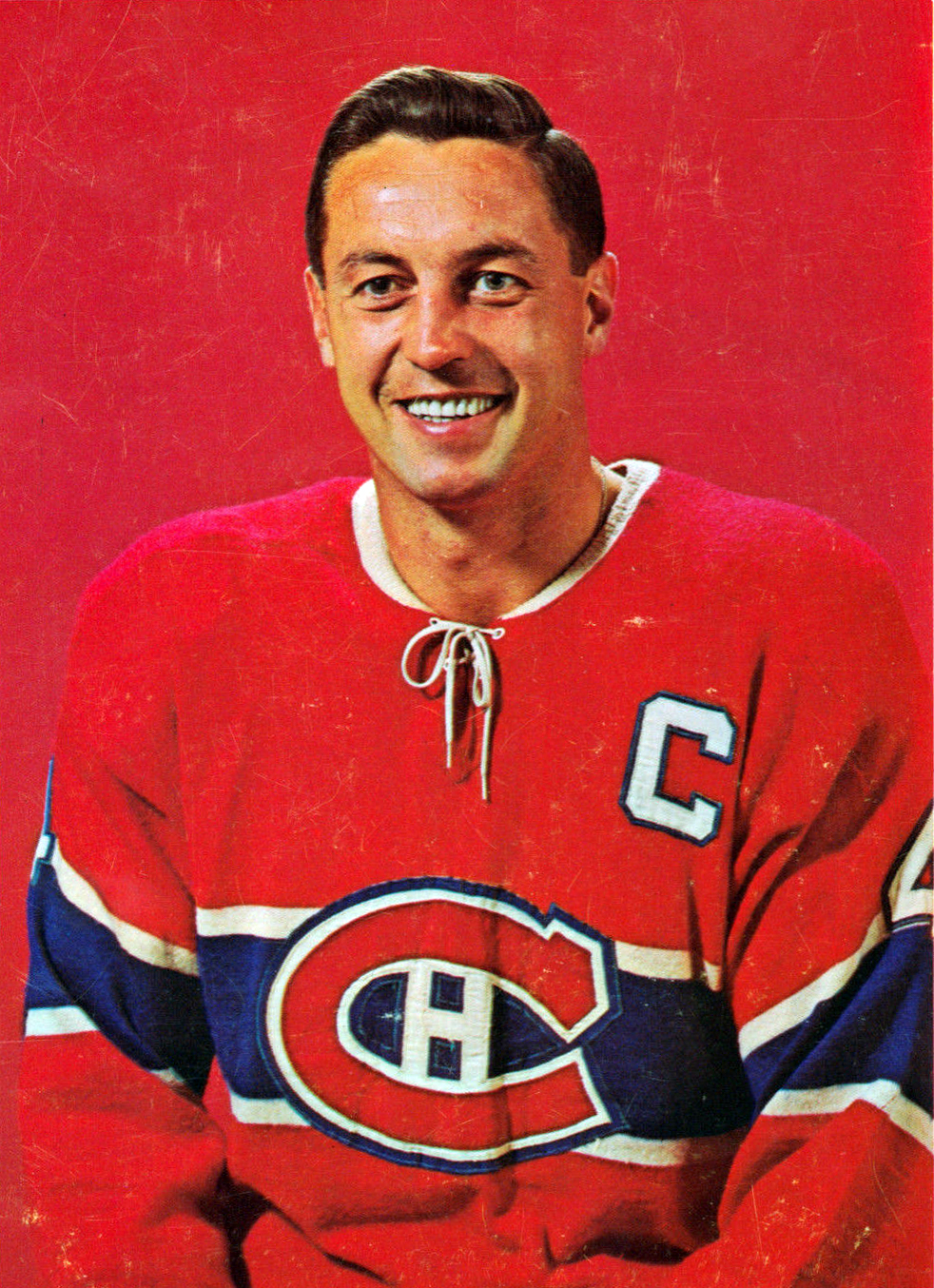
Jean Belliveau

- Léokim Beaumier-Lépine, actor
- Jean Béliveau, hockey player for the Montreal Canadiens (retired, Hall of Famer)
- Matthew Bergeron, professional American football for the Atlanta Falcons
- Sylvie Boucher, Conservative MP for the House of Commons of Canada
- William Cloutier, pop singer and actor
- René Corbet, hockey player for the Colorado Avalanche
- Phillip Danault, hockey player for the Montreal Canadiens
- Dumas, singer
- Jonathan Goulet, professional mixed martial artist
- Stu Grayson, professional wrestler
- Alex Labbé, professional Nascar driver
- François Labbé, businessman
- Martin Laroche, film director
- Sir Wilfrid Laurier, Canadian Prime Minister (1896–1911)
- Gilbert Perreault, hockey player for the Buffalo Sabres (retired, Hall of Famer)
- Édouard Richard, member of the House of Commons of Canada
- Marc Aurèle de Foy Suzor-Coté, Impressionist painter and sculptor (1869–1937)
- Esther Valiquette (1962 - 1994), documentary film director

== See also ==
- Monarchy in Quebec
- Royal eponyms in Canada
