= 42nd Quebec Legislature =

Quebec elected position

- Majority parliament
- Nov. 27, 2018 – Aug. 28, 2022

Parliament leaders
- Premier: François Legault; Oct. 18, 2018 – Apr. 15, 2026
- Leader of the Opposition: Pierre Arcand; 2018-2020
- Dominique Anglade; 2020-2022

Party caucuses
- Government: Coalition Avenir Québec
- Opposition: Liberal
- Recognized: Québec solidaire
- Parti Québécois

National Assembly
- Speaker of the Assembly: François Paradis; November 26, 2018 – November 28, 2022
- Government House leader: Simon Jolin-Barrette; 2018-10-18
- Members: 125 MNA seats

Sovereign
- Monarch: Elizabeth II; 6 February 1952 – 8 September 2022
- Charles III; 8 September 2022 – present
- Lieutenant governor: J. Michel Doyon; 24 September 2015 – 25 January 2024

Sessions
- 1st session November 27, 2018 – October 13, 2021
- 2nd session October 19, 2021 – August 28, 2022
← 41st	→ 43rd

The 42nd National Assembly of Quebec consists of those elected in the October 1, 2018, general election. As a result, François Legault (Coalition Avenir Québec) became Premier on October 18.

== Member list ==
Cabinet ministers are in bold, party leaders are in italic and the president of the National Assembly is marked with a †.

Name	Party	Riding	First elected / previously elected	No. of terms
**Pierre Dufour**	CAQ	Abitibi-Est	2018	1st term
Suzanne Blais	CAQ	Abitibi-Ouest	2018	1st term
Christine St-Pierre	Liberal	Acadie	2007	5th term
Lise Thériault	Liberal	Anjou–Louis-Riel	2002	7th term
Agnès Grondin	CAQ	Argenteuil	2018	1st term
Éric Lefebvre	CAQ	Arthabaska	2016	2nd term
Luc Provençal	CAQ	Beauce-Nord	2018	1st term
Samuel Poulin	CAQ	Beauce-Sud	2018	1st term
Claude Reid	CAQ	Beauharnois	2018	1st term
Stéphanie Lachance	CAQ	Bellechasse	2018	1st term
**Caroline Proulx**	CAQ	Berthier	2018	1st term
**Nadine Girault**	CAQ	Bertrand	2018	1st term
Mario Laframboise	CAQ	Blainville	2014	2nd term
Sylvain Roy	Parti Québécois	Bonaventure	2012	3rd term
Sylvain Roy	Independent	Bonaventure	2012	3rd term
**Simon Jolin-Barrette**	CAQ	Borduas	2014	2nd term
Paule Robitaille	Liberal	Bourassa-Sauvé	2018	1st term
Richard Campeau	CAQ	Bourget	2018	1st term
**Isabelle Charest**	CAQ	Brome-Missisquoi	2018	1st term
**Jean-François Roberge**	CAQ	Chambly	2014	2nd term
**Sonia LeBel**	CAQ	Champlain	2018	1st term
Mathieu Lévesque	CAQ	Chapleau	2018	1st term
**Jonatan Julien**	CAQ	Charlesbourg	2018	1st term
Émilie Foster	CAQ	Charlevoix–Côte-de-Beaupré	2018	1st term
Marie-Chantal Chassé	CAQ	Châteauguay	2018	1st term
Sylvain Lévesque	CAQ	Chauveau	2012, (Note: Vanier-Les Rivières) 2018	2nd term*
**Andrée Laforest**	CAQ	Chicoutimi	2018	1st term
Guy Ouellette	Liberal	Chomedey	2007	5th term
Guy Ouellette	Independent	Chomedey	2007	5th term
Marc Picard	CAQ	Chutes-de-la-Chaudière	2003	6th term
**Marie-Eve Proulx**	CAQ	Côte-du-Sud	2018	1st term
David Birnbaum	Liberal	D'Arcy-McGee	2014	2nd term
**Benoit Charette**	CAQ	Deux-Montagnes	2008, (Note: First elected as a PQ) 2014	3rd term*
Sébastien Schneeberger	CAQ	Drummond–Bois-Francs	2007, 2012	4th term*
François Tremblay	CAQ	Dubuc	2018	1st term
Lorraine Richard	Parti Québécois	Duplessis	2003	6th term
Monique Sauvé	Liberal	Fabre	2015	2nd term
Méganne Perry-Mélançon	Parti Québécois	Gaspé	2018	1st term
Robert Bussière	CAQ	Gatineau	2018	1st term
Gabriel Nadeau-Dubois	Québec solidaire	Gouin	2017	2nd term
**François Bonnardel**	CAQ	Granby	2007	5th term
**Eric Girard**	CAQ	Groulx	2018	1st term
Alexandre Leduc	Québec solidaire	Hochelaga-Maisonneuve	2018	1st term
Maryse Gaudreault	Libéral	Hull	2008	4th term
Claire IsaBelle	CAQ	Huntingdon	2018	1st term
Claire Samson	CAQ	Iberville	2014	2nd term
Claire Samson	Conservative	Iberville	2014	2nd term
Joël Arseneau	Parti Québécois	Îles-de-la-Madeleine	2018	1st term
Greg Kelley	Liberal	Jacques-Cartier	2018	1st term
Sol Zanetti	Québec solidaire	Jean-Lesage	2018	1st term
Filomena Rotiroti	Liberal	Jeanne-Mance–Viger	2008	1st term
Sébastien Proulx (until August 30, 2019)	Liberal	Jean-Talon	2007, (Note: Trois-Rivières (First elected as a ADQ)) 2015	3rd term*
Joëlle Boutin (since December 2, 2019)	CAQ	Jean-Talon	2019	1st term
**André Lamontagne**	CAQ	Johnson	2014	2nd term
Véronique Hivon	Parti Québécois	Joliette	2008	4th term
Sylvain Gaudreault	Parti Québécois	Jonquière	2007	5th term
Chantale Jeannotte	CAQ	Labelle	2018	1st term
Éric Girard	CAQ	Lac-Saint-Jean	2018	1st term
Marc Tanguay	Liberal	LaFontaine	2012	4th term
**Éric Caire**	CAQ	La Peltrie	2007	5th term
Gaétan Barrette	Liberal	La Pinière	2014	2nd term
Nicole Ménard	Liberal	Laporte	2007	5th term
**Christian Dubé**	CAQ	La Prairie	2012, (Note: Lévis) 2018	2nd term*
**François Legault**	CAQ	L'Assomption	1998, (Note: Rousseau (First elected as a PQ)) 2012	7th term*
Andrés Fontecilla	Québec solidaire	Laurier-Dorion	2018	1st term
Saul Polo	Liberal	Laval-des-Rapides	2014	2nd term
Marie-Louise Tardif	CAQ	Laviolette–Saint-Maurice	2018	1st term
Lucie Lecours	CAQ	Les Plaines	2018	1st term
François Paradis	CAQ	Lévis	2014	2nd term
Isabelle Lecours	CAQ	Lotbinière-Frontenac	2018	1st term
**Geneviève Guilbault**	CAQ	Louis-Hébert	2017	2nd term
Hélène David	Liberal	Marguerite-Bourgeoys	2014	2nd term
Catherine Fournier (until November 13, 2021)	Parti Québécois	Marie-Victorin	2016	2nd term
Catherine Fournier (until November 13, 2021)	Independent	Marie-Victorin	2016	2nd term
Shirley Dorismond (since April 11, 2022)	CAQ	Marie-Victorin	2022	1st term
Enrico Ciccone	Liberal	Marquette	2018	1st term
Simon Allaire	CAQ	Maskinongé	2018	1st term
Mathieu Lemay	CAQ	Masson	2014	2nd term
Pascal Bérubé	Parti Québécois	Matane-Matapédia	2007	5th term
Marie Montpetit	Liberal	Maurice-Richard	2014	2nd term
Marie Montpetit	Independent	Maurice-Richard	2014	2nd term
François Jacques	CAQ	Mégantic	2018	1st term
Ruba Ghazal	Québec solidaire	Mercier	2018	1st term
Francine Charbonneau	Liberal	Mille-Îles	2008	4th term
**Sylvie D'Amours**	CAQ	Mirabel	2014	2nd term
**Nathalie Roy**	CAQ	Montarville	2012	3rd term
Jean-François Simard	CAQ	Montmorency	1998, (Note: First elected as a PQ) 2018	2nd term*
Pierre Arcand	Liberal	Mont-Royal–Outremont	2007	5th term
Monsef Derraji	Liberal	Nelligan	2018	1st term
Donald Martel	CAQ	Nicolet-Bécancour	2012	3rd term
Kathleen Weil	Liberal	Notre-Dame-de-Grâce	2008	4th term
Gilles Bélanger	CAQ	Orford	2018	1st term
**Mathieu Lacombe**	CAQ	Papineau	2018	1st term
**Chantal Rouleau**	CAQ	Pointe-aux-Trembles	2018	1st term
André Fortin	Liberal	Pontiac	2014	2nd term
Vincent Caron	CAQ	Portneuf	2018	1st term
**Marguerite Blais**	CAQ	Prévost	2007, (Note: Saint-Henri–Sainte-Anne (First elected as a Liberal)) 2018	5th term*
Martin Ouellet	Parti Québécois	René-Lévesque	2015	2nd term
Lise Lavallée	CAQ	Repentigny	2014	2nd term
Jean-Bernard Émond	CAQ	Richelieu	2018	1st term
André Bachand	CAQ	Richmond	2018	1st term
Harold LeBel	Parti Québécois	Rimouski	2014	2nd term
Harold LeBel	Independent	Rimouski	2014	2nd term
Denis Tardif	CAQ	Rivière-du-Loup–Témiscouata	2018	1st term
Carlos Leitão	Liberal	Robert-Baldwin	2014	2nd term
Philippe Couillard (until October 4, 2018)	Liberal	Roberval	2003, (Note: Mont-Royal) 2013	5th term*
Nancy Guillemette (since December 10, 2018)	CAQ	Roberval	2018	1st term
Vincent Marissal	Québec solidaire	Rosemont	2018	1st term
Louis-Charles Thouin	CAQ	Rousseau	2018	1st term
Émilise Lessard-Therrien	Québec solidaire	Rouyn-Noranda–Témiscamingue	2018	1st term
Geneviève Hébert	CAQ	Saint-François	2018	1st term
Dominique Anglade	Liberal	Saint-Henri–Sainte-Anne	2015	2nd term
Chantal Soucy	CAQ	Saint-Hyacinthe	2014	2nd term
Louis Lemieux	CAQ	Saint-Jean	2018	1st term
Youri Chassin	CAQ	Saint-Jérôme	2018	1st term
Marwah Rizqy	Liberal	Saint-Laurent	2018	1st term
Manon Massé	Québec solidaire	Sainte-Marie–Saint-Jacques	2014	2nd term
Christopher Skeete	CAQ	Sainte-Rose	2018	1st term
**Danielle McCann**	CAQ	Sanguinet	2018	1st term
Christine Labrie	Québec solidaire	Sherbrooke	2018	1st term
Marilyne Picard	CAQ	Soulanges	2018	1st term
**Lionel Carmant**	CAQ	Taillon	2018	1st term
Catherine Dorion	Québec solidaire	Taschereau	2018	1st term
**Pierre Fitzgibbon**	CAQ	Terrebonne	2018	1st term
**Jean Boulet**	CAQ	Trois-Rivières	2018	1st term
Denis Lamothe	CAQ	Ungava	2018	1st term
Ian Lafrenière	CAQ	Vachon	2018	1st term
Mario Asselin	CAQ	Vanier-Les Rivières	2018	1st term
Marie-Claude Nichols	Liberal	Vaudreuil	2014	2nd term
Suzanne Dansereau	CAQ	Verchères	2018	1st term
Isabelle Melançon	Liberal	Verdun	2016	2nd term
Frantz Benjamin	Liberal	Viau	2018	1st term
Jean Rousselle	Liberal	Vimont	2012	3rd term
Jennifer Maccarone	Liberal	Westmount–Saint-Louis	2018	1st term

== Standings changes since the 42nd general election ==
Number of members per party by date	2018				2019			2020		2021								2022
Number of members per party by date	Oct 2	Oct 4	Oct 5	Dec 10	Mar 11	Aug 30	Dec 2	Dec 15	Dec 17	Mar 30	Apr 12	Jun 4	Jun 15	Jun 18	Sep 14	Nov 1	Nov 13	Apr 11
Coalition Avenir Québec	74			75			76		75	74	75		74		75			76
Liberal	31	30	29			28										27		
Québec solidaire	10																	
Parti Québécois	10				9			8				7						
Conservative	0													1				
Independent	0		1		2			3	4	5	4	5	6	5	4	5	4	
Total members	125	124		125		124	125										124	125
Vacant	0	1		0		1	0										1	0

42nd National Assembly of Quebec - Movement in seats held (2018-2022)
Party	2018	Gain/(loss) due to							2022
Party	2018	Resigned from party	Withdrawn from caucus	Resignation	Expulsion	Reinstatement	Change of allegiance	By-election gain	2022
Coalition Avenir Québec	74		(1)		(2)	2		3	76
Liberal	31			(2)	(2)				27
Parti Québécois	10	(1)	(1)		(1)				7
Québec solidaire	10								10
Conservative	–						1		1
Independent	–	1	2	(1)	5	(2)	(1)		4
Total	125	–	–	(3)	–	–	–	3	125

Changes in seats held (2018–2022)
Seat	Before				Change		
Seat	Date	Member	Party	Reason	Date	Member	Party
Bonaventure	June 4, 2021	Sylvain Roy	█ Parti Québécois	Withdrew from caucus			█ Independent
Chomedey	October 5, 2018	Guy Ouellette	█ Liberal	Expelled from caucus			█ Independent
Iberville	June 15, 2021	Claire Samson	█ CAQ	Expelled from caucus (Note: after giving a donation to the Conservative Party of Quebec)			█ Conservative
Jean-Talon	August 30, 2019	Sébastien Proulx	█ Liberal	Resignation	December 2, 2019	Joëlle Boutin	█ CAQ
Marie-Victorin	March 11, 2019	Catherine Fournier	█ Parti Québécois	Resigned from caucus			█ Independent
Marie-Victorin	November 1, 2021	Catherine Fournier	█ Independent	Resignation (Note: after winning the election for Mayor of Longueuil.)	Shirley Dorismond	█ CAQ	
Maurice-Richard	November 1, 2021	Marie Montpetit	█ Liberal	Expelled from caucus			█ Independent
Rimouski	December 15, 2020	Harold LeBel	█ Parti Québécois	Expelled from caucus			█ Independent
Rivière-du-Loup–Témiscouata	December 17, 2020	Denis Tardif	█ CAQ	Expelled from caucus			█ Independent
Rivière-du-Loup–Témiscouata	April 12, 2021	Denis Tardif	█ Independent	Reinstated			█ CAQ
Roberval	October 4, 2018	Philippe Couillard	█ Liberal	Resignation	December 10, 2018	Nancy Guillemette	█ CAQ
Rousseau	March 30, 2021	Louis-Charles Thouin	█ CAQ	Withdrew from caucus			█ Independent
Rousseau	September 14, 2021	Louis-Charles Thouin	█ Independent	Reinstated			█ CAQ
