= 41st Quebec Legislature =

- Majority parliament
- May. 20, 2014 – Aug. 23, 2018

Parliament leaders
- Premier: Philippe Couillard; Apr. 23, 2014 – Oct. 18, 2018
- Leader of the Opposition: Stéphane Bédard; April 23, 2014 – May 15, 2015
- Pierre Karl Péladeau; May 15, 2015 – May 2, 2016
- Sylvain Gaudreault; May 6, 2016 – October 7, 2016
- Jean-François Lisée; October 7, 2016 – October 1, 2018

Party caucuses
- Government: Liberal
- Opposition: Parti Québécois
- Recognized: Coalition Avenir Québec
- Unrecognized: Québec solidaire

National Assembly
- Seating arrangements of the National Assembly
- Members: 125 MNA seats

Sovereign
- Monarch: Elizabeth II; 6 February 1952 – 8 September 2022
- Lieutenant governor: Pierre Duchesne; 7 June 2007 – 24 September 2015
- J. Michel Doyon; 24 September 2015 – 25 January 2024

Sessions
- 1st session May 20, 2014 – August 23, 2018
← 40th	→ 42nd

The 41st National Assembly of Quebec consisted of those elected in the 2014 general election. Philippe Couillard (Liberal) was the premier.

== Member list ==
Cabinet ministers are in bold, party leaders are in italic and the president of the National Assembly is marked with a †.

Name	Party	Riding	First elected / previously elected	No. of terms
Guy Bourgeois	Liberal	Abitibi-Est	2014	1st term
François Gendron	Parti Québécois	Abitibi-Ouest	1976	11th term
Christine St-Pierre	Liberal	Acadie	2007	4th term
Lise Thériault	Liberal	Anjou–Louis-Riel	2002	6th term
Yves St-Denis	Liberal	Argenteuil	2014	1st term
Sylvie Roy (until July 31, 2016)	CAQ	Arthabaska	2003	5th term
Sylvie Roy (until July 31, 2016)	Independent (since August 26, 2015)	Arthabaska	2003	5th term
Éric Lefebvre (from December 5, 2016)	CAQ	Arthabaska	2016	1st term
André Spénard	CAQ	Beauce-Nord	2012	2nd term
Robert Dutil (until September 22, 2015)	Liberal	Beauce-Sud	1985, 2008	5th term*
Paul Busque (from November 9, 2015)	Liberal	Beauce-Sud	2015	1st term
Guy Leclair	Parti Québécois	Beauharnois	2008	3rd term
Dominique Vien	Liberal	Bellechasse	2003, 2008	4th term*
André Villeneuve	Parti Québécois	Berthier	2008	3rd term
Claude Cousineau	Parti Québécois	Bertrand	1998	6th term
Mario Laframboise	CAQ	Blainville	2014	1st term
Sylvain Roy	Parti Québécois	Bonaventure	2012	2nd term
Simon Jolin-Barrette	CAQ	Borduas	2014	1st term
Rita de Santis	Liberal	Bourassa-Sauvé	2012	2nd term
Maka Kotto	Parti Québécois	Bourget	2008	4th term
Pierre Paradis	Liberal	Brome-Missisquoi	1980	11th term
Pierre Paradis	Independent (from January 26, 2017)	Brome-Missisquoi	1980	11th term
Pierre Paradis	Liberal (from August 16, 2018)	Brome-Missisquoi	1980	11th term
Jean-François Roberge	CAQ	Chambly	2014	1st term
Pierre-Michel Auger	Liberal	Champlain	2007, (Note: First elected as a ADQ) 2014	2nd term*
Marc Carrière	Liberal	Chapleau	2008	3rd term
François Blais	Liberal	Charlesbourg	2014	1st term
Caroline Simard	Liberal	Charlevoix–Côte-de-Beaupré	2014	1st term
Pierre Moreau	Liberal	Châteauguay	2003, (Note: Marguerite-D'Youville) 2008	4th term*
Gérard Deltell (until April 7, 2015)	CAQ	Chauveau	2008	3rd term
Véronyque Tremblay (from June 8, 2015)	Liberal	Chauveau	2015	1st term
Stéphane Bédard (until October 22, 2015)	Parti Québécois	Chicoutimi	1998	6th term
Mireille Jean (from April 11, 2016)	Parti Québécois	Chicoutimi	2016	1st term
Guy Ouellette	Liberal	Chomedey	2007	4th term
Marc Picard	CAQ	Chutes-de-la-Chaudière	2003	5th term
Norbert Morin	Liberal	Côte-du-Sud	2003, 2008	4th term*
Marie Montpetit	Liberal	Crémazie	2014	1st term
David Birnbaum	Liberal	D'Arcy-McGee	2014	1st term
Benoit Charette	CAQ	Deux-Montagnes	2008, (Note: First elected as a PQ) 2014	2nd term*
Sébastien Schneeberger	CAQ	Drummond–Bois-Francs	2007, 2012	3rd term*
Serge Simard	Liberal	Dubuc	2008, 2014	2nd term*
Lorraine Richard	Parti Québécois	Duplessis	2003	5th term
Gilles Ouimet (until August 24, 2015)	Liberal	Fabre	2012	2nd term
Monique Sauvé (from November 9, 2015)	Liberal	Fabre	2015	1st term
Gaétan Lelièvre	Parti Québécois	Gaspé	2012	2nd term
Gaétan Lelièvre	Independent (since May 15, 2017)	Gaspé	2012	2nd term
Stéphanie Vallée	Liberal	Gatineau	2007	4th term
Françoise David (until January 19, 2017)	Québec solidaire	Gouin	2012	2nd term
Gabriel Nadeau-Dubois (from May 29, 2017)	Québec solidaire	Gouin	2017	1st term
François Bonnardel	CAQ	Granby	2007	4th term
Claude Surprenant	CAQ	Groulx	2014	1st term
Claude Surprenant	Independent (since January 24, 2017)	Groulx	2014	1st term
Carole Poirier	Parti Québécois	Hochelaga-Maisonneuve	2008	3rd term
Maryse Gaudreault	Libéral	Hull	2008	4th term
Stéphane Billette	Libéral	Huntingdon	2008	3rd term
Claire Samson	CAQ	Iberville	2014	1st term
Germain Chevarie	Liberal	Îles-de-la-Madeleine	2008, 2014	2nd term*
Geoffrey Kelley	Liberal	Jacques-Cartier	1994	7th term
André Drolet	Liberal	Jean-Lesage	2008	3rd term
Filomena Rotiroti	Liberal	Jeanne-Mance–Viger	2008	3rd term
Yves Bolduc (until February 26, 2015)	Liberal	Jean-Talon	2008	4th term
Sébastien Proulx (from June 8, 2015)	Liberal	Jean-Talon	2007, (Note: Trois-Rivières (First elected as a ADQ)) 2015	2nd term*
André Lamontagne	CAQ	Johnson	2014	1st term
Véronique Hivon	Parti Québécois	Joliette	2008	3rd term
Sylvain Gaudreault	Parti Québécois	Jonquière	2007	4th term
Sylvain Pagé	Parti Québécois	Labelle	2001	6th term
Alexandre Cloutier	Parti Québécois	Lac-Saint-Jean	2007	4th term
Marc Tanguay	Liberal	LaFontaine	2012	3rd term
Éric Caire	CAQ	La Peltrie	2007	4th term
Gaétan Barrette	Liberal	La Pinière	2014	1st term
Nicole Ménard	Liberal	Laporte	2007	4th term
Richard Merlini	Liberal	La Prairie	2007, (Note: Chambly (First elected as a ADQ)) 2014	2nd term*
François Legault	CAQ	L'Assomption	1998, (Note: Rousseau (First elected as a PQ)) 2012	6th term*
Gerry Sklavounos	Liberal	Laurier-Dorion	2007	4th term
Gerry Sklavounos	Independent (since October 20, 2016)	Laurier-Dorion	2007	4th term
Saul Polo	Liberal	Laval-des-Rapides	2014	1st term
Julie Boulet	Liberal	Laviolette	2001	6th term
Christian Dubé (until August 15, 2014)	CAQ	Lévis	2012	2nd term
François Paradis (from October 20, 2014)	CAQ	Lévis	2014	1st term
Laurent Lessard	Liberal	Lotbinière-Frontenac	2003	5th term
Sam Hamad (until April 27, 2017)	Liberal	Louis-Hébert	2003	5th term
Geneviève Guilbault (from October 2, 2017)	CAQ	Louis-Hébert	2017	1st term
Robert Poëti	Liberal	Marguerite-Bourgeoys	2012	2nd term
Bernard Drainville (until June 13, 2016)	Parti Québécois	Marie-Victorin	2007	4th term
Catherine Fournier (from December 5, 2016)	Parti Québécois	Marie-Victorin	2016	1st term
François Ouimet	Liberal	Marquette	1994	7th term
Marc Plante	Liberal	Maskinongé	2014	1st term
Mathieu Lemay	CAQ	Masson	2014	1st term
Pascal Bérubé	Parti Québécois	Matane-Matapédia	2007	4th term
Ghislain Bolduc	Liberal	Mégantic	2012	2nd term
Amir Khadir	Québec solidaire	Mercier	2008	3rd term
Francine Charbonneau	Liberal	Mille-Îles	2008	3rd term
Sylvie D'Amours	CAQ	Mirabel	2014	1st term
Nathalie Roy	CAQ	Montarville	2012	2nd term
Raymond Bernier	Liberal	Montmorency	2003, 2008, 2014	3rd term*
Pierre Arcand	Liberal	Mont-Royal	2007	4th term
Martin Coiteux	Liberal	Nelligan	2014	1st term
Donald Martel	CAQ	Nicolet-Bécancour	2012	2nd term
Kathleen Weil	Liberal	Notre-Dame-de-Grâce	2008	3rd term
Pierre Reid	Liberal	Orford	2003	5th term
Hélène David	Liberal	Outremont	2014	1st term
Alexandre Iracà	Liberal	Papineau	2012	2nd term
Nicole Léger	Parti Québécois	Pointe-aux-Trembles	1996, 2008	7th term*
André Fortin	Liberal	Pontiac	2014	1st term
Michel Matte	Liberal	Portneuf	2008, 2014	2nd term*
Marjolain Dufour (until September 3, 2015)	Parti Québécois	René-Lévesque	2003	5th term
Martin Ouellet (from November 9, 2015)	Parti Québécois	René-Lévesque	2015	1st term
Lise Lavallée	CAQ	Repentigny	2014	1st term
Élaine Zakaïb (until September 29, 2014)	Parti Québécois	Richelieu	2012	2nd term
Sylvain Rochon (from March 9, 2015)	Parti Québécois	Richelieu	2015	1st term
Karine Vallières	Liberal	Richmond	2012	2nd term
Harold LeBel	Parti Québécois	Rimouski	2014	1st term
Jean D'Amour	Liberal	Rivière-du-Loup–Témiscouata	2009	3rd term
Carlos Leitão	Liberal	Robert-Baldwin	2014	1st term
**Philippe Couillard**	Liberal	Roberval	2003, (Note: Mont-Royal) 2013	4th term*
Jean-François Lisée	Parti Québécois	Rosemont	2012	2nd term
Nicolas Marceau	Parti Québécois	Rousseau	2009	3rd term
Luc Blanchette	Liberal	Rouyn-Noranda–Témiscamingue	2014	1st term
Guy Hardy	Liberal	Saint-François	2014	1st term
Marguerite Blais (until August 20, 2015)	Liberal	Saint-Henri–Sainte-Anne	2007	4th term
Dominique Anglade (from November 9, 2015)	Liberal	Saint-Henri–Sainte-Anne	2015	1st term
Chantal Soucy	CAQ	Saint-Hyacinthe	2014	1st term
Dave Turcotte	Parti Québécois	Saint-Jean	2008	3rd term
Pierre Karl Péladeau (until May 2, 2016)	Parti Québécois	Saint-Jérôme	2014	1st term
Marc Bourcier (from December 5, 2016)	Parti Québécois	Saint-Jérôme	2016	1st term
Jean-Marc Fournier	Liberal	Saint-Laurent	1994, (Note: Châteauguay) 2010	7th term*
Manon Massé	Québec solidaire	Sainte-Marie–Saint-Jacques	2014	1st term
Pierre Giguère	Liberal	Saint-Maurice	2014	1st term
Jean Habel	Liberal	Sainte-Rose	2014	1st term
Alain Therrien	Parti Québécois	Sanguinet	2012	2nd term
Luc Fortin	Liberal	Sherbrooke	2014	1st term
Lucie Charlebois	Liberal	Soulanges	2003	5th term
Diane Lamarre	Parti Québécois	Taillon	2014	1st term
Agnès Maltais	Parti Québécois	Taschereau	1998	6th term
Mathieu Traversy	Parti Québécois	Terrebonne	2008	3rd term
Jean-Denis Girard	Liberal	Trois-Rivières	2014	1st term
Jean Boucher	Liberal	Ungava	2014	1st term
Martine Ouellet	Parti Québécois	Vachon	2010	3rd term
Martine Ouellet	Independent (since February 5, 2017)	Vachon	2010	3rd term
Patrick Huot	Liberal	Vanier-Les Rivières	2008, 2014	2nd term*
Marie-Claude Nichols	Liberal	Vaudreuil	2014	1st term
Stéphane Bergeron	Parti Québécois	Verchères	2005	5th term
Jacques Daoust (until August 19, 2016)	Liberal	Verdun	2014	1st term
Isabelle Melançon (from December 5, 2016)	Liberal	Verdun	2016	1st term
David Heurtel	Liberal	Viau	2013	2nd term
Jean Rousselle	Liberal	Vimont	2012	2nd term
Jacques Chagnon	Liberal	Westmount–Saint-Louis	1985	9th term

== Standings changes since the 41st general election ==
Number of members per party by date	2014				2015											2016							2017							
Number of members per party by date	Apr 7	Aug 15	Sep 29	Oct 20	Feb 26	Mar 9	Apr 7	Jun 8	Aug 21	Aug 24	Aug 26	Sep 3	Sep 22	Oct 22	Nov 9	Apr 11	May 2	Jun 13	Jul 31	Aug 19	Oct 20	Dec 5	Jan 19	Jan 24	Jan 26	Feb 5	Apr 27	May 16	May 29	Oct 2
Liberal	70				69			71	70	69			68		71					70	69	70			69		68			
Parti Québécois	30		29			30						29		28	29	30	29	28				30				29		28		
Coalition Avenir Québec	22	21		22			21				20											21		20						21
Québec solidaire	3																						2						3	
Independent	0										1								0		1			2	3	4		5		
Total members	125	124	123	124	123	124	123	125	124	123		122	121	120	124	125	124	123	122	121		125	124				123		124	125
Vacant	0	1	2	1	2	1	2	0	1	2		3	4	5	1	0	1	2	3	4		0	1				2		1	0
Government majority	15	16	17	16	15	14	15	17	16	15		16	15	16	18	17	18	19	20	19	18	15	16		15		14		13	12

Membership changes in the 41st Assembly
Date	Name	District	Party	Reason
April 7, 2014	See list of members			Election day of the 41st Quebec general election
August 15, 2014	Christian Dubé	Lévis	Coalition Avenir Québec	Resigned seat
September 29, 2014	Élaine Zakaïb	Richelieu	Parti Québécois	Resigned seat
October 20, 2014	François Paradis	Lévis	Coalition Avenir Québec	Elected in by-election
February 26, 2015	Yves Bolduc	Jean-Talon	Quebec Liberal Party	Resigned seat
March 9, 2015	Sylvain Rochon	Richelieu	Parti Québécois	Elected in by-election
April 7, 2015	Gérard Deltell	Chauveau	Coalition Avenir Québec	Resigned seat
June 8, 2015	Véronyque Tremblay	Chauveau	Liberal Party	Elected in by-election
June 8, 2015	Sébastien Proulx	Jean-Talon	Liberal Party	Elected in by-election
August 20, 2015	Marguerite Blais	Saint-Henri–Sainte-Anne	Liberal Party	Resigned seat
August 24, 2015	Gilles Ouimet	Fabre	Liberal Party	Resigned seat
August 26, 2015	Sylvie Roy	Arthabaska	Independent	Left CAQ caucus to sit as Independent.
September 3, 2015	Marjolain Dufour	René-Lévesque	Parti Québécois	Resigned seat
September 22, 2015	Robert Dutil	Beauce-Sud	Liberal Party	Resigned seat
October 22, 2015	Stéphane Bédard	Chicoutimi	Parti Québécois	Resigned seat
November 9, 2015	Dominique Anglade	Saint-Henri-Sainte-Anne	Liberal Party	Elected in by-election
November 9, 2015	Paul Busque	Beauce-Sud	Liberal Party	Elected in by-election
November 9, 2015	Monique Sauvé	Fabre	Liberal Party	Elected in by-election
November 9, 2015	Martin Ouellet	René-Lévesque	Parti Québécois	Elected in by-election
April 11, 2016	Mireille Jean	Chicoutimi	Parti Québécois	Elected in by-election
May 2, 2016	Pierre Karl Péladeau	Saint-Jérôme	Parti Québécois	Resigned seat
June 13, 2016	Bernard Drainville	Marie-Victorin	Parti Québécois	Resigned seat
July 31, 2016	Sylvie Roy	Arthabaska	Independent	Death (acute hepatitis)
August 19, 2016	Jacques Daoust	Verdun	Liberal Party	Resigned
October 20, 2016	Gerry Sklavounos	Laurier-Dorion	Independent	Removed from the Liberal caucus due to sexual assault allegations, that he was later cleared of.
December 5, 2016	Marc Bourcier	Saint-Jérôme	Parti Québécois	Elected in by-election
December 5, 2016	Catherine Fournier	Marie-Victorin	Parti Québécois	Elected in by-election
December 5, 2016	Éric Lefebvre	Arthabaska	CAQ	Elected in by-election
December 5, 2016	Isabelle Melançon	Verdun	Liberal Party	Elected in by-election
January 19, 2017	Françoise David	Gouin	Québec solidaire	Resigned
January 24, 2017	Claude Surprenant	Groulx	Independent	Removed from CAQ caucus due to expense scandal.
January 26, 2017	Pierre Paradis	Brome-Missisquoi	Independent	Removed from the Liberal caucus due to sexual harassment allegations.
February 5, 2017	Martine Ouellet	Vachon	Independent	Resigned from the PQ Caucus to run for the Leadership of the Bloc Québécois
April 27, 2017	Sam Hamad	Louis-Hébert	Liberal Party	Resigned
May 16, 2017	Gaétan Lelièvre	Gaspé	Independent	Removed from the PQ caucus after admitting to accepting gifts as Administrator of Gaspé.
May 29, 2017	Gabriel Nadeau-Dubois	Gouin	Québec solidaire	Elected in by-election
October 2, 2017	Geneviève Guilbault	Louis-Hébert	Coalition Avenir Québec	Elected in by-election
