= 43rd Quebec Legislature =

- Majority parliament
- Nov. 29, 2022 – Aug. 27, 2026

Parliament leaders
- Premier: François Legault; Oct. 18, 2018 – Apr. 15, 2026
- Christine Fréchette; Apr. 15, 2026 – present
- Leader of the Opposition: Marc Tanguay; Nov. 10, 2022 – Jun. 19, 2025
- Marwah Rizqy; Jun. 19, 2025 – Nov. 18, 2025
- André Fortin; Nov. 18, 2025 – Dec. 19, 2025
- Marc Tanguay; Dec. 19, 2025 – Feb. 14, 2026
- André Fortin; Feb. 14, 2026 – Oct. 19, 2026

Party caucuses
- Government: Coalition Avenir Québec
- Opposition: Liberal
- Unrecognized: Québec solidaire
- Parti Québécois
- Conservative

National Assembly
- Speaker of the Assembly: Nathalie Roy; Nov. 29, 2022 – present
- Government House leader: Simon Jolin-Barrette; Oct. 18, 2018 – Apr. 21, 2026
- François Bonnardel; Apr. 21, 2026 – present
- Opposition House leader: Michelle Setlakwe; Jun. 26, 2025 – present
- Members: 125 MNA seats

Sovereign
- Monarch: Charles III; 8 September 2022 – present
- Lieutenant governor: J. Michel Doyon; 24 September 2015 – 25 January 2024
- Manon Jeannotte; 25 January 2024 – present

Sessions
- 1st session November 29, 2022 – September 10, 2025
- 2nd session September 30, 2025 – April 8, 2026
- 3rd session May 5, 2026 – August 27, 2026
← 42nd	→ 44th

The 43rd National Assembly of Quebec consists of those elected in the October 3, 2022, general election. As a result, François Legault's Coalition Avenir Québec government was re-elected. He was succeeded by Christine Fréchette on April 15, 2026, after Legault's resignation as CAQ leader.

== Member list ==
Cabinet ministers are in bold, party leaders are in italic and the president of the National Assembly is marked with a †.

Name	Party	Riding	First elected / previously elected	No. of terms
Pierre Dufour	CAQ	Abitibi-Est	2018	2nd term
Pierre Dufour	Independent	Abitibi-Est	2018	2nd term
Suzanne Blais	CAQ	Abitibi-Ouest	2018	2nd term
André Morin	Liberal	Acadie	2022	1st term
Karine Boivin Roy	CAQ	Anjou–Louis-Riel	2022	1st term
Agnès Grondin	CAQ	Argenteuil	2018	2nd term
Éric Lefebvre	CAQ	Arthabaska	2016	3rd term
Éric Lefebvre	Independent	Arthabaska	2016	3rd term
Alex Boissonneault (since August 11, 2025)	Parti Québécois	Arthabaska	2025	1st term
Luc Provençal	CAQ	Beauce-Nord	2018	2nd term
Samuel Poulin	CAQ	Beauce-Sud	2018	2nd term
Claude Reid	CAQ	Beauharnois	2018	2nd term
Stéphanie Lachance	CAQ	Bellechasse	2018	2nd term
**Caroline Proulx**	CAQ	Berthier	2018	2nd term
**France-Élaine Duranceau**	CAQ	Bertrand	2022	1st term
Mario Laframboise	CAQ	Blainville	2014	3rd term
Catherine Blouin	CAQ	Bonaventure	2022	1st term
**Simon Jolin-Barrette**	CAQ	Borduas	2014	3rd term
Madwa-Nika Cadet	Liberal	Bourassa-Sauvé	2022	1st term
**Isabelle Charest**	CAQ	Brome-Missisquoi	2018	2nd term
Paul St-Pierre Plamondon	Parti Québécois	Camille-Laurin	2022	1st term
**Jean-François Roberge**	CAQ	Chambly	2014	3rd term
**Sonia LeBel**	CAQ	Champlain	2018	2nd term
Mathieu Lévesque	CAQ	Chapleau	2018	2nd term
**Jonatan Julien**	CAQ	Charlesbourg	2018	2nd term
Kariane Bourassa	CAQ	Charlevoix–Côte-de-Beaupré	2022	1st term
Marie-Belle Gendron	CAQ	Châteauguay	2022	1st term
Sylvain Lévesque	CAQ	Chauveau	2012, (Note: Vanier-Les Rivières) 2018	3rd term*
**Andrée Laforest** (until September 4, 2025)	CAQ	Chicoutimi	2018	2nd term
Marie-Karlynn Laflamme (since February 23, 2026)	Parti Québécois	Chicoutimi	2026	1st term
Sona Lakhoyan Olivier	Liberal	Chomedey	2022	1st term
Sona Lakhoyan Olivier	Independent	Chomedey	2022	1st term
**Martine Biron**	CAQ	Chutes-de-la-Chaudière	2022	1st term
Mathieu Rivest	CAQ	Côte-du-Sud	2022	1st term
Elisabeth Prass	Liberal	D'Arcy-McGee	2022	1st term
**Benoit Charette**	CAQ	Deux-Montagnes	2008, (Note: First elected as a PQ) 2014	4th term*
Sébastien Schneeberger	CAQ	Drummond–Bois-Francs	2007, 2012	5th term*
François Tremblay	CAQ	Dubuc	2018	2nd term
François Tremblay	Independent	Dubuc	2018	2nd term
**Kateri Champagne Jourdain**	CAQ	Duplessis	2022	1st term
Alice Abou-Khalil	CAQ	Fabre	2022	1st term
Stéphane Sainte-Croix	CAQ	Gaspé	2022	1st term
Robert Bussière	CAQ	Gatineau	2018	2nd term
Gabriel Nadeau-Dubois	Québec solidaire	Gouin	2017	3rd term
**François Bonnardel**	CAQ	Granby	2007	6th term
**Eric Girard**	CAQ	Groulx	2018	2nd term
Alexandre Leduc	Québec solidaire	Hochelaga-Maisonneuve	2018	2nd term
Suzanne Tremblay	CAQ	Hull	2022	1st term
Carole Mallette	CAQ	Huntingdon	2022	1st term
Audrey Bogemans	CAQ	Iberville	2022	1st term
Joël Arseneau	Parti Québécois	Îles-de-la-Madeleine	2018	2nd term
Gregory Kelley	Liberal	Jacques-Cartier	2018	2nd term
Sol Zanetti	Québec solidaire	Jean-Lesage	2018	2nd term
Filomena Rotiroti	Liberal	Jeanne-Mance–Viger	2008	5th term
Joëlle Boutin (until July 19, 2023)	CAQ	Jean-Talon	2019	2nd term
Pascal Paradis (since October 2, 2023)	Parti Québécois	Jean-Talon	2023	1st term
**André Lamontagne**	CAQ	Johnson	2014	3rd term
François St-Louis	CAQ	Joliette	2022	1st term
Yannick Gagnon	CAQ	Jonquière	2022	1st term
Chantale Jeannotte	CAQ	Labelle	2018	2nd term
Éric Girard	CAQ	Lac-Saint-Jean	2018	2nd term
Marc Tanguay	Liberal	LaFontaine	2012	5th term
**Éric Caire**	CAQ	La Peltrie	2007	6th term
Linda Caron	Liberal	La Pinière	2022	1st term
Isabelle Poulet	CAQ	Laporte	2022	1st term
Isabelle Poulet	Independent	Laporte	2022	1st term
Christian Dubé	CAQ	La Prairie	2012, (Note: Lévis) 2018	3rd term*
Christian Dubé	Independent	La Prairie	2012, 2018	3rd term*
François Legault	CAQ	L'Assomption	1998, (Note: Rousseau (First elected as a PQ)) 2012	8th term*
Andrés Fontecilla	Québec solidaire	Laurier-Dorion	2018	2nd term
Céline Haytayan	CAQ	Laval-des-Rapides	2022	1st term
Marie-Louise Tardif	CAQ	Laviolette–Saint-Maurice	2018	2nd term
Lucie Lecours	CAQ	Les Plaines	2018	2nd term
**Bernard Drainville**	CAQ	Lévis	2007, (Note: Marie-Victorin (First elected as a PQ)) 2022	5th term*
Isabelle Lecours	CAQ	Lotbinière-Frontenac	2018	2nd term
**Geneviève Guilbault**	CAQ	Louis-Hébert	2017	3rd term
Fred Beauchemin	Liberal	Marguerite-Bourgeoys	2022	1st term
Fred Beauchemin	Independent	Marguerite-Bourgeoys	2022	1st term
Fred Beauchemin	Liberal	Marguerite-Bourgeoys	2022	1st term
Shirley Dorismond	CAQ	Marie-Victorin	2022	2nd term
Enrico Ciccone	Liberal	Marquette	2018	2nd term
Simon Allaire	CAQ	Maskinongé	2018	2nd term
Mathieu Lemay	CAQ	Masson	2014	3rd term
Pascal Bérubé	Parti Québécois	Matane-Matapédia	2007	6th term
Haroun Bouazzi	Québec solidaire	Maurice-Richard	2022	1st term
François Jacques	CAQ	Mégantic	2018	2nd term
Ruba Ghazal	Québec solidaire	Mercier	2018	2nd term
Virginie Dufour	Liberal	Mille-Îles	2022	1st term
Sylvie D'Amours	CAQ	Mirabel	2014	3rd term
Nathalie Roy	CAQ	Montarville	2012	4th term
Jean-François Simard	CAQ	Montmorency	1998, (Note: First elected as a PQ) 2018	3rd term*
Michelle Setlakwe	Liberal	Mont-Royal–Outremont	2022	1st term
Monsef Derraji	Liberal	Nelligan	2018	2nd term
Donald Martel	CAQ	Nicolet-Bécancour	2012	4th term
Désirée McGraw	Liberal	Notre-Dame-de-Grâce	2022	1st term
Gilles Bélanger	CAQ	Orford	2018	2nd term
Gilles Bélanger	Independent	Orford	2018	2nd term
**Mathieu Lacombe**	CAQ	Papineau	2018	2nd term
**Chantal Rouleau**	CAQ	Pointe-aux-Trembles	2018	2nd term
André Fortin	Liberal	Pontiac	2014	3rd term
Vincent Caron	CAQ	Portneuf	2018	2nd term
**Sonia Bélanger**	CAQ	Prévost	2022	1st term
Yves Montigny	CAQ	René-Lévesque	2022	1st term
**Pascale Déry**	CAQ	Repentigny	2022	1st term
Jean-Bernard Émond	CAQ	Richelieu	2018	2nd term
André Bachand	CAQ	Richmond	2018	2nd term
**Maïté Blanchette Vézina**	CAQ	Rimouski	2022	1st term
**Maïté Blanchette Vézina**	Independent	Rimouski	2022	1st term
**Maïté Blanchette Vézina**	PCQ	Rimouski	2022	1st term
Amélie Dionne	CAQ	Rivière-du-Loup–Témiscouata	2022	1st term
Brigitte Garceau	Liberal	Robert-Baldwin	2022	1st term
Nancy Guillemette	CAQ	Roberval	2018	2nd term
Vincent Marissal	Québec solidaire	Rosemont	2018	2nd term
Vincent Marissal	Independent	Rosemont	2018	2nd term
Louis-Charles Thouin	CAQ	Rousseau	2018	2nd term
Daniel Bernard	CAQ	Rouyn-Noranda–Témiscamingue	2003, (Note: First elected as a Liberal) 2008, (Note: Re-elected as a Liberal) 2022	3rd term*
Geneviève Hébert	CAQ	Saint-François	2018	2nd term
Dominique Anglade (until Dec. 1, 2022)	Liberal	Saint-Henri–Sainte-Anne	2015	3rd term
Guillaume Cliche-Rivard (since Mar. 13, 2023)	Québec solidaire	Saint-Henri–Sainte-Anne	2023	1st term
Chantal Soucy	CAQ	Saint-Hyacinthe	2014	3rd term
Louis Lemieux	CAQ	Saint-Jean	2018	2nd term
Youri Chassin	CAQ	Saint-Jérôme	2018	2nd term
Youri Chassin	Independent	Saint-Jérôme	2018	2nd term
Marwah Rizqy	Liberal	Saint-Laurent	2018	2nd term
Marwah Rizqy	Independent	Saint-Laurent	2018	2nd term
Manon Massé	Québec solidaire	Sainte-Marie–Saint-Jacques	2014	3rd term
**Christopher Skeete**	CAQ	Sainte-Rose	2018	2nd term
**Christine Fréchette**	CAQ	Sanguinet	2022	1st term
Christine Labrie	Québec solidaire	Sherbrooke	2018	2nd term
Marilyne Picard	CAQ	Soulanges	2018	2nd term
Lionel Carmant	CAQ	Taillon	2018	2nd term
Lionel Carmant	Independent	Taillon	2018	2nd term
Lionel Carmant	CAQ	Taillon	2018	2nd term
Étienne Grandmont	Québec solidaire	Taschereau	2022	1st term
**Pierre Fitzgibbon** (resigned Sept 4)	CAQ	Terrebonne	2018	2nd term
Catherine Gentilcore (since March 17, 2025)	Parti Québécois	Terrebonne	2025	1st term
**Jean Boulet**	CAQ	Trois-Rivières	2018	2nd term
Denis Lamothe	CAQ	Ungava	2018	2nd term
**Ian Lafrenière**	CAQ	Vachon	2018	2nd term
Mario Asselin	CAQ	Vanier-Les Rivières	2018	2nd term
Marie-Claude Nichols	Liberal (Until October 2022) (Note: Marie-Claude Nichols was elected as a Liberal candidate in Vaudreuil. She was expelled from the Liberal caucus on October 27 after refusing the transport critic role.)	Vaudreuil	2014	3rd term
Marie-Claude Nichols	Independent	Vaudreuil	2014	3rd term
Marie-Claude Nichols	Liberal	Vaudreuil	2014	3rd term
**Suzanne Roy**	CAQ	Verchères	2022	1st term
Alejandra Zaga Mendez	Québec solidaire	Verdun	2022	1st term
Frantz Benjamin	Liberal	Viau	2018	2nd term
Valérie Schmaltz	CAQ	Vimont	2022	1st term
Jennifer Maccarone	Liberal	Westmount–Saint-Louis	2018	2nd term

== Changes ==
=== Changes of membership and party affiliations ===
seat changed hands after by-election
involuntary departure
Coalition Avenir Québec
Parti Québécois
Liberal
Québec solidaire
Conservative
Independent

43rd Quebec Legislature (2022–26) - Membership and party affiliation changes
Electoral District	Before			Change	
Electoral District	Date	Reason	Incumbent	New member	Date
Vaudreuil	October 27, 2022	Expelled from caucus; re-admitted to caucus	Marie-Claude Nichols		May 2, 2025
Saint-Henri–Sainte-Anne	Dec 1, 2022	Resignation	Dominique Anglade	Guillaume Cliche-Rivard	March 13, 2023
Laviolette–Saint-Maurice	March 7, 2023	Left caucus; rejoined caucus	Marie-Louise Tardif		March 28, 2023
Jean-Talon	July 31, 2023	Resignation	Joëlle Boutin	Pascal Paradis	October 2, 2023
Marguerite-Bourgeoys	October 7, 2023	Removed from caucus; re-admitted to caucus	Frédéric Beauchemin		December 15, 2023
Arthabaska	April 16, 2024	Resignation from party	Éric Lefebvre		
Arthabaska	March 18, 2025	Resignation	Éric Lefebvre	Alex Boissonneault	August 11, 2025
Terrebonne	Sep 3, 2024	Resignation	Pierre Fitzgibbon	Catherine Gentilcore	March 17, 2025
Saint-Jérôme	Sep 12, 2024	Resignation from party	Youri Chassin		
Chicoutimi	Sep 4, 2025	Resignation	Andrée Laforest	Marie-Karlynn Laflamme	Feb 23, 2026
Abitibi-Est	Sep 5, 2025	Expelled from caucus	Pierre Dufour		
Rimouski	Sep 18, 2025	Left caucus; joined Conservative	Maïté Blanchette Vézina		March 24, 2026
Taillon	October 30, 2025	Resignation from cabinet and caucus; rejoined party caucus	Lionel Carmant		April 1, 2026
Laporte	Nov 4, 2025	Expelled from caucus	Isabelle Poulet		
Rosemont	Nov 22, 2025	Left caucus	Vincent Marissal		
Saint-Laurent	Dec 2, 2025	Expelled from caucus	Marwah Rizqy		
Chomedey	Dec 4, 2025	Expelled from caucus	Sona Lakhoyan Olivier		
La Prairie	Dec 18, 2025	Left caucus	Christian Dubé		
Dubuc	January 9, 2026	Left caucus	François Tremblay		
Orford	April 22, 2026	Left caucus	Gilles Bélanger		

=== Changes in party standing ===
Number of members per party by date	2022			2023					2024			2025														2026				
Number of members per party by date	Oct 3	Oct 27	Dec 1	Mar 7	Mar 13	Mar 29	Jul 19	Oct 2	Apr 16	Sept 3	Sept 12	Mar 17	Mar 18	Jun 19	Aug 11	Sep 4	Sep 5	Sep 18	Oct 30	Nov 4	Nov 18	Nov 22	Dec 2	Dec 4	Dec 18	Jan 9	Feb 23	Mar 24	Apr 1	Apr 22
Coalition Avenir Québec	90			89		90	89		88	87	86		85			84	83		82	81					80	79			80	79
Liberal	21	20	19											20							19			18						
Québec solidaire	11				12																		11							
Parti Québécois	3							4				5			6												7			
Independent	0	1		2		1			2		3		2	1				2	3	4	5	6	7	8	9	10		9	8	9
Conservative	0																											1		
Vacant	0		1		0		1	0		1		0	1		0		1										0			
