= Minister for Youth =

Minister for Youth may refer to:

== Australia ==
- Minister for Youth (Australia)
  - Minister for Youth (Victoria)
  - Minister for Youth (Western Australia)
  - Minister for Youth (New South Wales)

== Other ==
- Minister for Youth and Sports (Ghana)
- Minister for Youth Policies
- Minister for Youth (New Zealand)
- Minister for Youth Protection and Rehabilitation (Quebec)

== See also ==
- Minister for Youth Justice
