= Julie White (politician) =

Canadian politician

Julie White MNA

Member of the National Assembly for Jean-Talon
- Incumbent
- Assumed office October 5, 2026
- Preceded by: Pascal Paradis

Personal details
- Party: Liberal

Julie White is a Canadian politician who is the Member of the National Assembly of Quebec for Jean-Talon. She is also the deputy leader of the Quebec Liberal Party.

White was the President of Quebec Manufacturers & Exporters as well as the Vice-President of Canadian Manufacturers & Exporters.

== Electoral Record ==
2026 Quebec general election: Jean-Talon
** Preliminary results — Not yet official **
Party	Candidate	Votes	%	±%
Liberal	Julie White	11,522	31.76	+22.91
Parti Québécois	Pascal Paradis	10,615	29.26	–14.80
Conservative	Jesse Robitaille	5,680	15.66	+9.59
Québec solidaire	Sonia Tchuembou	5,121	14.11	–3.39
Coalition Avenir Québec	William Denis	2,968	8.18	–13.15
Green	Mehdi Lahlou	175	0.48	–0.11
Parti nul	Anne Rufiange	140	0.39	N/A
Démocratie directe	Robert Dubé	35	0.10	–0.06
Équipe Autonomiste	Claudiu Bell	26	0.07	–0.04
Total valid votes		36,282	99.16	+0.14
Total rejected ballots		308	0.84	–0.14
Turnout		36,590	76.55	+21.34
Electors on the lists		47,798		
Liberal gain from Parti Québécois		Swing		+18.86
Source: Élections Québec

2022 Quebec general election: Jean-Talon
Party	Candidate	Votes	%	±%
Coalition Avenir Québec	Joëlle Boutin	11,105	32.50	-10.88
Québec solidaire	Olivier Bolduc	8,117	23.76	+6.81
Parti Québécois	Gabriel Coulombe	6,386	18.69	+9.37
Liberal	Julie White	4,616	13.51	-11.52
Conservative	Sébastien Clavet	3,541	10.36	+9.35
Green	Alexandre Dallaire	262	0.77	-2.02
Climat Québec	Julien Cardinal	93	0.27	–
Équipe Autonomiste	Stéphane Pouleur	44	0.13	+0.03
Total valid votes		34,164	99.02	–
Total rejected ballots		337	0.98	+0.50
Turnout		34,501	73.86	+24.67
Electors on the lists		46,714	–	–
Coalition Avenir Québec hold		Swing		-8.84
