= Margaret Delisle =

Canadian politician (born 1946)

Member of the National Assembly of Quebec for Jean-Talon
- In office September 12, 1994 – March 26, 2007
- Preceded by: Gil Rémillard
- Succeeded by: Philippe Couillard

Personal details
- Born: Margaret Fortier; July 4, 1946 (age 79) Quebec City, Quebec, Canada
- Party: Liberal
- Relatives: Michael Fortier (brother)

Margaret Fortier Delisle (born July 4, 1946) is a politician in Quebec, Canada.

== Early life ==
Fortier was born on July 4, 1946, in Quebec City to Wenceslas Fortier and Theresa Martin. She is the older sister of Canadian federal politician Michael Fortier.

== Political career ==
She was a member of the National Assembly (MNA) in the National Assembly of Quebec for the constituency of Jean-Talon. She was first elected in 1994, and sat as a member of the Quebec Liberal Party. She was named Minister of Youth Protection and Rehabilitation (Ministre déléguée à la Protection de la jeunesse et à la Réadaptation) on February 18, 2005. She is a graduate of Université Laval, and worked as a teacher before entering politics. She is the sister of former Conservative Senator Michael Fortier.

In 1982, while still working as a teacher, she was elected as a member of the city council of the former city of Sillery (which was amalgamated into Quebec City, in 2002), and became mayor of Sillery in 1985. She ran for the National Assembly in 1994, winning by 25 votes, and was re-elected in 1998 by 157 votes and finally in 2003 by a margin of 2500 votes.

On February 9, 2007, she announced that she would not run in the 2007 Quebec general election, citing health reasons. She suffers from Rheumatoid arthritis. Philippe Couillard who changed ridings from Mont-Royal in Montreal, succeeded Delisle for the seat.

She was responsible for amendments to Quebec's youth protection legislation to provide a more stable environment for children under the protection of the Quebec child welfare agency, the Direction de la protection de la jeunesse (DPJ).
