= Jean-Talon =

Provincial electoral district in Quebec, Canada

Coordinates: 46°46′0″N 71°18′30″W

Quebec electoral district
- Location in Quebec

Provincial electoral district
- Legislature: National Assembly of Quebec
MNA
Julie White
Liberal
- District created: 1965
- First contested: 1966
- Last contested: 2026

Demographics
- Population (2016): 62,040
- Electors (2018): 45,743
- Area (km²): 34.5
- Pop. density (per km²): 1,798.3
- Census division: Quebec City (part)
- Census subdivision: Quebec City (part)

Jean-Talon (French pronunciation: [ʒɑ̃ talɔ̃]) is a provincial electoral district in the Capitale-Nationale region of Quebec, Canada. It consists of part of the Sainte-Foy–Sillery–Cap-Rouge borough of Quebec City.

It was named after former French colonial administrator of New France Jean Talon.

== History ==
It was created for the 1966 election from Québec-Centre and parts of Québec-Est and Québec-Ouest electoral districts. The riding's current boundaries and those in 1966 share no territory in common, as the riding has continuously shifted westward throughout its history.

When the riding was created in 1966, it was located in the central part of Quebec City, and included the neighbourhoods of Old Quebec, Basse-Ville, Saint Roch, Saint-Sacrement and most of Saint-Jean-Baptiste and Montcalm. Today, the entirety of the 1966 Jean-Talon riding can be found in Taschereau, while the modern Jean-Talon riding was entirely in Louis-Hébert at the time.

The redistribution prior to the 1973 election saw the riding shift westward to accommodate the new riding of Taschereau which would become the city's new central riding. The riding lost the neighbourhoods of Old Quebec, Saint-Roch and Basse-Ville to Taschereau. In return, it gained the rest of Saint-Jean-Baptiste and Montcalm and the city of Sillery.

In the redistribution prior to the 1981 election, the riding lost a bit of the Saint-Jean-Baptiste neighbourhood while gaining much of the Saint-Louis neighbourhood of the city of Sainte-Foy.

In the redistribution prior to the 1994 election, the riding lost the remainder of the Saint-Jean-Baptiste neighbourhood and a large chunk of the Montcalm neighbourhood.

Prior to the 2003 election, the riding gained some more of Saint-Louis and half of the Cité-Universitaire neighbourhood of Sainte-Foy.

In the change from the 2001 to the 2011 electoral map, it gained the remainder of the Saint-Louis and Cité-Universitaire neighbourhoods and all of Plateau from Louis-Hébert, but lost territory to Vanier-Les Rivières and all of Monctcalm and half of Saint-Sacrement to Taschereau.

The riding is a traditional Liberal stronghold in the Capitale-Nationale region; however, this was broken with the election of Joëlle Boutin for the CAQ in the a by-election held on December 2, 2019. Boutin resigning triggered the October 2023 by-election, which was won by the Parti Québécois candidate, Pascal Paradis.

== Members of the Legislative Assembly / National Assembly ==
Legislature	Years	Member	Party
Riding created from Québec-Centre, Québec-Est and Québec-Ouest
28th	1966–1970	Henri Beaupré	Liberal
29th	1970–1973	Raymond Garneau	Liberal
30th	1973–1976	Raymond Garneau	Liberal
31st	1976–1978	Raymond Garneau	Liberal
31st	1979–1981	Jean-Claude Rivest	Liberal
32nd	1981–1985	Jean-Claude Rivest	Liberal
33rd	1985–1989	Gil Rémillard	Liberal
34th	1989–1994	Gil Rémillard	Liberal
35th	1994–1998	Margaret Delisle	Liberal
36th	1998–2003	Margaret Delisle	Liberal
37th	2003–2007	Margaret Delisle	Liberal
38th	2007–2008	Philippe Couillard	Liberal
38th	2008–2008	Yves Bolduc	Liberal
39th	2008–2012	Yves Bolduc	Liberal
40th	2012–2014	Yves Bolduc	Liberal
41st	2014–2015	Yves Bolduc	Liberal
41st	2015–2018	Sébastien Proulx	Liberal
42nd	2018–2019	Sébastien Proulx	Liberal
42nd	2019–2022	Joëlle Boutin	Coalition Avenir Québec
43rd	2022–2023	Joëlle Boutin	Coalition Avenir Québec
43rd	2023–2026	Pascal Paradis	Parti Québécois
44th	2026–Present	Julie White	Liberal

== Election results ==
2026 Quebec general election
** Preliminary results — Not yet official **
Party	Candidate	Votes	%	±%
Liberal	Julie White	11,522	31.76	+22.91
Parti Québécois	Pascal Paradis	10,615	29.26	–14.80
Conservative	Jesse Robitaille	5,680	15.66	+9.59
Québec solidaire	Sonia Tchuembou	5,121	14.11	–3.39
Coalition Avenir Québec	William Denis	2,968	8.18	–13.15
Green	Mehdi Lahlou	175	0.48	–0.11
Parti nul	Anne Rufiange	140	0.39	N/A
Démocratie directe	Robert Dubé	35	0.10	–0.06
Équipe Autonomiste	Claudiu Bell	26	0.07	–0.04
Total valid votes		36,282	99.16	+0.14
Total rejected ballots		308	0.84	–0.14
Turnout		36,590	76.55	+21.34
Electors on the lists		47,798		
Liberal gain from Parti Québécois		Swing		+18.86
Source: Élections Québec

Quebec provincial by-election, October 2, 2023 On the resignation of Joëlle Boutin
Party	Candidate	Votes	%	±%
Parti Québécois	Pascal Paradis	11,307	44.06	+25.37
Coalition Avenir Québec	Marie-Anik Shoiry	5,474	21.33	-11.18
Québec solidaire	Olivier Bolduc	4,491	17.50	-6.26
Liberal	Élise Avard Bernier	2,270	8.85	-4.67
Conservative	Jesse Robitaille	1,558	6.07	-4.29
Climat Québec	Martine Ouellet	308	1.20	+0.93
Green	Kadidia Mahamane Bamba	152	0.59	-0.17
Démocratie directe	Lucie Perreault	41	0.16	
Independent	Jean Duval	35	0.14	
Équipe Autonomiste	Steve Therion	28	0.11	-0.02
Total valid votes		25,664	99.02	–
Total rejected ballots		253	0.98	-0.00
Turnout		25,917	55.21	-18.64
Electors on the lists		46,941	–	–
Parti Québécois gain from Coalition Avenir Québec		Swing		+18.27

2022 Quebec general election
Party	Candidate	Votes	%	±%
Coalition Avenir Québec	Joëlle Boutin	11,105	32.50	-10.88
Québec solidaire	Olivier Bolduc	8,117	23.76	+6.81
Parti Québécois	Gabriel Coulombe	6,386	18.69	+9.37
Liberal	Julie White	4,616	13.51	-11.52
Conservative	Sébastien Clavet	3,541	10.36	+9.35
Green	Alexandre Dallaire	262	0.77	-2.02
Climat Québec	Julien Cardinal	93	0.27	–
Équipe Autonomiste	Stéphane Pouleur	44	0.13	+0.03
Total valid votes		34,164	99.02	–
Total rejected ballots		337	0.98	+0.50
Turnout		34,501	73.86	+24.67
Electors on the lists		46,714	–	–
Coalition Avenir Québec hold		Swing		-8.84

Quebec provincial by-election, December 2, 2019 On the resignation of Sébastien Proulx
Party	Candidate	Votes	%	±%
Coalition Avenir Québec	Joëlle Boutin	9,950	43.38	+14.81
Liberal	Gertrude Bourdon	5,742	25.03	-7.54
Québec solidaire	Olivier Bolduc	3,888	16.95	-2.22
Parti Québécois	Sylvain Barrette	2,137	9.32	-5.14
Green	Émilie Coulombe	640	2.79	+0.99
Conservative	Éric Barnabé	233	1.02	-0.81
Independent	Ali Dahan	206	0.90	+0.20
Citoyens au pouvoir	Stéphane Blais	85	0.37	-
Indépendance du Québec	Michel Blondin	32	0.14	-
Équipe Autonomiste	Stéphane Pouleur	23	0.10	-0.48
Total valid votes		22,936	99.53	
Total rejected ballots		109	0.47	-0.71
Turnout		23,045	49.18	-25.98
Electors on the lists		46,857	–	
Coalition Avenir Québec gain from Liberal		Swing		+11.18

2018 Quebec general election
Party	Candidate	Votes	%	±%
Liberal	Sébastien Proulx	11,069	32.58	-9.18
Coalition Avenir Québec	Joëlle Boutin	9,706	28.57	+14.75
Québec solidaire	Patrick Provost	6,515	19.18	+11.53
Parti Québécois	Sylvain Barrette	4,912	14.46	-15.51
Conservative	Carl Bérubé	620	1.82	+0.62
Green	Macarena Diab	610	1.8	-0.6
Independent	Ali Dahan	236	0.69	
New Democratic	Hamid Nadji	197	0.58	
Équipe Autonomiste	Stéphane Pouleur	64	0.19	-0.09
Marxist–Leninist	Ginette Boutet	46	0.14	-0.48
Total valid votes		33,975	98.82	
Total rejected ballots		405	1.18	
Turnout		34,380	75.16	
Eligible voters		45,743		
Liberal hold		Swing		-11.97
Source(s) "Rapport des résultats officiels du scrutin". Élections Québec.

Quebec provincial by-election, June 8, 2015 On the resignation of Yves Bolduc
Party	Candidate	Votes	%	±%
Liberal	Sébastien Proulx	8,214	41.76	-2.74
Parti Québécois	Clément Laberge	5,894	29.97	+7.49
Coalition Avenir Québec	Alain Fecteau	2,717	13.81	-6.75
Québec solidaire	Amélie Boisvert	1,503	7.64	-1.41
Option nationale	Sol Zanetti	474	2.41	+0.90
Green	Elodie Boisjoly-Dubreuil	472	2.40	–
Conservative	Sylvain Rancourt	237	1.20	+0.61
Parti des sans Parti	Sylvain Drolet	76	0.39	–
Équipe Autonomiste	Stéphane Pouleur	55	0.28	+0.09
Parti indépendantiste	Grégoire Bonneau-Fortier	27	0.14	–
Total valid votes		19,669	99.19	
Total rejected ballots		161	0.81	
Turnout		19,830	43.61	-34.33
Electors on the lists		45,475	–	
Liberal hold		Swing		-5.12

2014 Quebec general election
Party	Candidate	Votes	%	±%
Liberal	Yves Bolduc	15,492	44.50	+7.20
Parti Québécois	Clément Laberge	7,824	22.48	-5.26
Coalition Avenir Québec	Hugues Beaulieu	7,158	20.56	-3.55
Québec solidaire	Eveline Gueppe	3,151	9.05	+2.65
Option nationale	Alexandre Lavallée	526	1.51	-2.21
Parti nul	Maxime Couillard	389	1.12	–
Conservative	Monique Roy Verville	206	0.59	–
Équipe Autonomiste	Stéphane Pouleur	66	0.19	-0.53
Total valid votes		34,812	98.88	
Total rejected ballots		393	1.12	+0.03
Turnout		35,205	77.94	-2.99
Electors on the lists		45,172	–	
Liberal hold		Swing		+6.23

2012 Quebec general election
Party	Candidate	Votes	%	±%
Liberal	Yves Bolduc	13,534	37.31	-12.12
Parti Québécois	Neko Likongo	10,063	27.74	-2.33
Coalition Avenir Québec	Hugues Beaulieu	8,747	24.11	+11.18
Québec solidaire	Emilie Guimond-Bélanger	2,321	6.40	+2.35
Option nationale	Guillaume Langlois	1,351	3.72	–
Équipe Autonomiste	Stéphane Pouleur	262	0.72	–
Total valid votes		36,278	98.92	–
Total rejected ballots		397	1.08	–
Turnout		36,675	80.93	
Electors on the lists		45,317	–	–
Liberal hold		Swing		-4.90

^ Change is from redistributed results. CAQ change is from ADQ.

2008 Quebec general election redistributed results
Party	Vote	%
Liberal	15,816	49.43
Parti Québécois	9,620	30.07
Action démocratique	4,139	12.94
Québec solidaire	1,295	4.05
Green	1,126	3.52

2008 Quebec general election
Party	Candidate	Votes	%	±%
Liberal	Yves Bolduc	13,853	49.71	-8.78
Parti Québécois	Patrick Neko Likongo	8,992	32.27	+1.77
Action démocratique	Martin Briand	2,546	9.14	+4.50
Québec solidaire	Marc-André Gauthier	1,409	5.06	+2.60
Green	Nathalie Gingras	1,065	3.82	+0.39
Total valid votes		27,865	98.99	–
Total rejected ballots		283	1.01	+0.47
Turnout		28,148	69.07	+17.90
Electors on the lists		40,750	–	–
Liberal hold		Swing		-5.27

Quebec provincial by-election, September 29, 2008 On the resignation of Philippe Couillard
Party	Candidate	Votes	%	±%
Liberal	Yves Bolduc	12,039	58.49	+16.53
Parti Québécois	Françoise Mercure	6,278	30.50	+0.37
Action démocratique	Martin Briand	955	4.64	-13.87
Green	Yvan Dutil	707	3.43	-1.20
Québec solidaire	Marc-André Gauthier	505	2.45	-2.02
Parti indépendantiste	Luc Duranleau	99	0.48	–
Total valid votes		20,583	99.46	–
Total rejected ballots		111	0.54	-0.18
Turnout		20,694	51.18	-28.80
Electors on the lists		40,434	–	–
Liberal hold		Swing		+8.08

2007 Quebec general election
Party	Candidate	Votes	%	±%
Liberal	Philippe Couillard	13,732	41.96	-3.63
Parti Québécois	Véronique Hivon	9,859	30.13	-5.23
Action démocratique	Luc de la Sablonnière	6,056	18.51	+3.34
Green	Ali Dahan	1,518	4.64	+3.23
Québec solidaire	Bill Clennett	1,463	4.47	+2.95*
Christian Democracy	Francis Denis	95	0.29	-
Total valid votes		32,723	99.29	–
Total rejected ballots		235	0.71	+0.06
Turnout		32,958	79.98	-0.47
Electors on the lists		41,208	–	–
Liberal hold		Swing		+0.80

* Increase is from UFP

2003 Quebec general election
Party	Candidate	Votes	%	±%
Liberal	Margaret F. Delisle	15,475	45.60	+0.27
Parti Québécois	Daniel-Mercier Gouin	11,999	35.36	-9.42
Action démocratique	Simon Lauzon	5,149	15.17	+7.04
UFP	Sacha Alcide Calixte	515	1.52	-
Green	Antonine Yaccarini	477	1.41	-
Bloc Pot	Sabrina Falardeau	197	0.58	-
Independent	Robert Bonenfant	126	0.37	-
Total valid votes		32,938	99.35	–
Total rejected ballots		222	0.65	
Turnout		34,160	80.45	
Electors on the lists		42,462	–	–

1998 Quebec general election
Party	Candidate	Votes	%	±%
Liberal	Margaret F. Delisle	12,817	45.33	+1.43
Parti Québécois	Daniel-Mercier Gouin	12,661	44.78	+0.97
Action démocratique	Martin-Beaudoin Lecours	2,298	8.13	+0.65
Socialist Democracy	Sébestien Bouchard	326	1.15	+0.03
Independent	Nelson St-Laurent	171	0.60	-2.32
Total valid votes		28,273	98.99	
Total rejected ballots		288	1.01	-0.93
Turnout		28,561	85.04	-3.89
Electors on the lists		33,584	–	
Liberal hold		Swing		+0.23

^ PDS change is from NDP

1995 Quebec referendum
Side	Votes	%
Non	16,159	51.99
Oui	14,921	48.01

1994 Quebec general election
Party	Candidate	Votes	%
Liberal	Margaret F. Delisle	12,229	43.90
Parti Québécois	Diane Lavallée	12,204	43.81
Action démocratique	Stéphane Gagnon	2,298	7.47
Independent	Nelson St-Laurent	816	2.93
New Democratic	Karl Adomeit	313	1.12
Natural Law	Michel Nadeau	130	0.47
Development	Patrice Fortin	83	0.30
Total valid votes		27,857	98.06
Total rejected ballots		551	1.94
Turnout		28,408	88.95
Electors on the lists		31,938	–

1992 Charlottetown Accord referendum
Side	Votes	%
Non	18,229	55.26
Oui	14,760	44.74

1989 Quebec general election
Party	Candidate	Votes	%
Liberal	Gil Rémillard	16,530	54.40
Parti Québécois	Martine Hébert	12,272	40.39
New Democratic Party of Quebec	Gilles Fiset	977	3.22
Independent	Nelson St-Laurent	606	1.99
Total valid votes		30,385	97.44
Total rejected ballots		797	2.56
Turnout		31,182	84.06
Electors on the lists		37,095	–
Source: Official Results, Le Directeur général des élections du Québec.

1985 Quebec general election
Party	Candidate	Votes	%
Liberal	Gil Rémillard	18,396	58.39
Parti Québécois	Ghislain Théberge	10,740	34.09
New Democratic	Jan Warnke	1,727	5.48
Union Nationale	Nelson St-Laurent	291	0.93
Progressive Conservative	Philippe Bouchard	256	0.81
Christian Socialism	Nadia Chassé	94	0.30
Total valid votes		31,504	98.48
Total rejected ballots		485	1.52
Turnout		31,989	82.79
Electors on the lists		38,637	–

1981 Quebec general election
Party	Candidate	Votes	%
Liberal	Jean-Claude Rivest	17,290	52.28
Parti Québécois	Monique Cloutier	15,044	45.48
Union Nationale	Roland Drolet	526	1.59
Independent	Jean Baillargeon	215	0.56
Total valid votes		33,075	98.81
Total rejected ballots		400	1.19
Turnout		33,475	85.96
Electors on the lists		38,942	–

1980 Quebec referendum
Side	Votes	%
Non	16,753	58.41
Oui	11,928	41.59

Quebec provincial by-election, 1979
Party	Candidate	Votes	%
Liberal	Jean-Claude Rivest	14,714	57.90
Parti Québécois	Louise Beaudoin	8,977	35.33
Union Nationale	Grégoire Biron	1,569	6.17
Freedom of Choice	J.A. Yves Beaudoin	151	0.59
Total valid votes		25,411	96.89
Total rejected ballots		816	3.11
Turnout		26,227	80.64
Electors on the lists		32,523	–

1976 Quebec general election
Party	Candidate	Votes	%
Liberal	Raymond Garneau	14,339	49.46
Parti Québécois	Louise Beaudoin	11,532	45.48
Union Nationale	Madame Charles Boucher	2,706	9.33
Ralliement créditiste	Vilmont Rodrigue	417	1.44
Total valid votes		28,994	97.53
Total rejected ballots		733	2.47
Turnout		29,727	88.54
Electors on the lists		33,573	–

1973 Quebec general election
Party	Candidate	Votes	%
Liberal	Raymond Garneau	18,708	64.89
Parti Québécois	Jacques Boulay	8,512	29.52
Union Nationale	Yves Gonthier	933	3.24
Parti créditiste	Marc de Goumois	677	2.35
Total valid votes		28,830	98.21
Total rejected ballots		525	1.79
Turnout		29,355	84.50
Electors on the lists		34,740	–

1970 Quebec general election
Party	Candidate	Votes	%
Liberal	Raymond Garneau	12,565	41,63
Parti Québécois	Paul Daoust	6,497	21.53
Union Nationale	Jean Sirois	6,381	21.14
Parti créditiste	Claude Boyer	4,625	15.32
Independent	Jean Lavoie	114	0.38
Total valid votes		30,182	97.49
Total rejected ballots		777	2.51
Turnout		30,959	82.07
Electors on the lists		37,724	–

1966 Quebec general election
Party	Candidate	Votes	%
Liberal	Henri Beaupré	14,257	53.23
Union Nationale	Louis J. Chaput	10,436	38.96
RIN	Henri-Paul Gagné	1,384	5.17
Ralliement national	Jean Miville-De Chêne	709	2.65
Total valid votes		26,786	97.47
Total rejected ballots		695	2.53
Turnout		27,481	70.11
Electors on the lists		39,195	–

== See also ==
- List of Quebec provincial electoral districts
- Canadian provincial electoral districts
