= Yves Bolduc =

Canadian doctor and politician (born 1957)

Member of the National Assembly of Quebec for Jean-Talon
- In office September 30, 2008 – February 26, 2015
- Preceded by: Philippe Couillard
- Succeeded by: Sébastien Proulx

Personal details
- Born: March 6, 1957 (age 69) Alma, Quebec, Canada
- Party: Quebec Liberal Party
- Spouse: Chantal Trépanier
- Profession: general practitioner, coroner
- Cabinet: Minister of Health and Social Services

Yves Bolduc (born March 6, 1957, in Alma, Quebec) is a Canadian doctor and politician in the province of Quebec. He was named the new Minister of Health and Social Services of Quebec on June 25, 2008, succeeding Philippe Couillard who resigned on the same day following five years as Minister for that portfolio. and was member of the National Assembly of Quebec of the Quebec City riding of Jean-Talon. He is a member of the Quebec Liberal Party.

== Education and professional career ==
Bolduc holds a Doctor of Medicine (M.D.), a master's degree from the École nationale d'administration publique and a bachelor's degree in bioethics from the Université du Québec à Chicoutimi. He started his studies at the Université Laval where he obtained a bachelor's degree in health sciences.

Bolduc started working as a general practitioner in 1981 and as a coroner in 1985. He was also the general manager of the Health and Social services center of the Vallée-de-l'Or in the Abitibi-Témiscamingue region and ran the professional services department of the Lac Saint-Jean Health and Social Services Center for fourteen years. He was also president of the Association des Conseils de médecins, dentistes et pharmaciens du Québec and a member of the Alma Chamber of Commerce.

In his years as a practitioner, Bolduc specialized in service accessibility, and he implemented methods inspired by the Toyota assembly line to better manage the operating room at the Val-d'Or Hospital.

== Political career ==
Bolduc ran as a member of the Liberal Party during the 2007 general election in the riding of Lac Saint-Jean. However, he was defeated by the Parti Québécois candidate Alexandre Cloutier. The PQ swept the entire Saguenay–Lac-Saint-Jean region in that election.

By becoming a member of the Jean Charest cabinet, Bolduc became the first unelected Minister since the PQ's David Levine, who was named delegate minister for health in the Bernard Landry cabinet in 2002. About only 40 other non-elected members since 1874 were named to Cabinet.

Bolduc ran in a by-election on September 29 in the Jean-Talon riding left vacant by the departure of Couillard. Bolduc was easily elected, receiving 58% of the vote.

== Controversy ==
While Quebec Education Minister in 2015, Mr. Bolduc publicly defended the policy which allowed a school administrator in Quebec City to strip search a 15-year-old student. The statement caused outrage among some Quebecers who started a petition asking for his resignation. He later announced a re-examination of the rules, stating an independent party will be investigating the situation.

Following much speculation, Bolduc announced his resignation as both Education Minister and MNA on February 26, 2015.

Political offices
Preceded by Philippe Couillard	Minister of Health and Social Services; 2008–2012	Succeeded by Réjean Hébert
Preceded by Marie Malavoy	Minister of Education, Sport and Leisure; 2014–2015	Succeeded by François Blais
