= 2023 Jean-Talon provincial by-election =

By-election in Quebec

- October 2, 2023

Riding of Jean-Talon
- Turnout: 55.21%
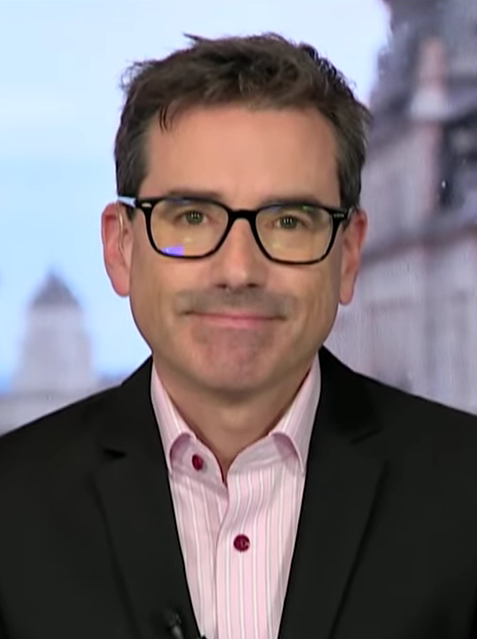
	First party	Second party	Third party
		CAQ	QS
Candidate	Pascal Paradis	Marie-Anik Shoiry	Olivier Bolduc
Party	Parti Québécois	Coalition Avenir Québec	Québec solidaire
Popular vote	11,307	5,474	4,491
Percentage	44.06%	21.33%	17.50%
Swing	▲25.37%	▼11.18%	▼6.26%
	Fourth party	Fifth party
	PLQ	PCQ
Candidate	Élise Avard Bernier	Jesse Robitaille
Party	Liberal	Conservative
Popular vote	2,270	1,558
Percentage	8.85%	6.07%
Swing	▼4.67%	▼4.29%
MNA before election
Joëlle Boutin
Coalition Avenir Québec
Elected MNA
Pascal Paradis
Parti Québécois

A by-election was held on October 2, 2023, in the provincial riding of Jean-Talon in Quebec. This was triggered following the resignation of CAQ MNA Joëlle Boutin. The Parti Québécois candidate Pascal Paradis won the election.

The PQ win is notable for two reasons: PQ had never before won the riding of Jean-Talon and this also marked their first win at a by-election since 2016.

== Background ==
Jean-Talon is a constituency in Quebec City and was once a Liberal stronghold before being taken by the CAQ in a 2019 by-election.

An issue during the by election was the Coalition Avenir Québec government of François Legault cancelling a tunnel project in Quebec City.

== Candidates ==
- Marie-Anik Shoiry, Coalition Avenir Québec
- Olivier Bolduc, Québec solidaire
- Pascal Paradis, Parti Québécois
- Élise Avard Bernier, Quebec Liberal Party
- Jesse Robitaille, Conservative Party of Québec
- Martine Ouellet, Climat Québec
- Kadidia Mahamane Bamba, Green Party of Quebec

== 2023 result ==
22 per cent of eligible voters cast early ballots on 24 and 25 September.

Quebec provincial by-election, October 2, 2023 On the resignation of Joëlle Boutin
Party	Candidate	Votes	%	±%
Parti Québécois	Pascal Paradis	11,307	44.06	+25.37
Coalition Avenir Québec	Marie-Anik Shoiry	5,474	21.33	–11.18
Québec solidaire	Olivier Bolduc	4,491	17.50	–6.26
Liberal	Élise Avard Bernier	2,270	8.85	–4.67
Conservative	Jesse Robitaille	1,558	6.07	–4.29
Climat Québec	Martine Ouellet	308	1.20	+0.93
Green	Kadidia Mahamane Bamba	152	0.59	–0.17
Démocratie directe	Lucie Perreault	41	0.16	
Independent	Jean Duval	35	0.14	
Équipe Autonomiste	Steve Therion	28	0.11	–0.02
Total valid votes		25,664	99.02	–
Total rejected ballots		253	0.98	0.00
Turnout		25,917	55.21	–18.64
Electors on the lists		46,941	–	–
Parti Québécois gain from Coalition Avenir Québec		Swing		+18.27

== Previous result ==
2022 Quebec general election
Party	Candidate	Votes	%	±%
Coalition Avenir Québec	Joëlle Boutin	11,105	32.50	–10.88
Québec solidaire	Olivier Bolduc	8,117	23.76	+6.81
Parti Québécois	Gabriel Coulombe	6,386	18.69	+9.37
Liberal	Julie White	4,616	13.51	–11.52
Conservative	Sébastien Clavet	3,541	10.36	+9.35
Green	Alexandre Dallaire	262	0.77	–2.02
Climat Québec	Julien Cardinal	93	0.27	–
Équipe Autonomiste	Stéphane Pouleur	44	0.13	+0.03
Total valid votes		34,164	99.02	–
Total rejected ballots		337	0.98	+0.50
Turnout		34,501	73.86	+24.67
Electors on the lists		46,714	–	–
Coalition Avenir Québec hold		Swing		–8.84

== See also ==
- List of Quebec by-elections
- 2023 Saint-Henri—Sainte-Anne provincial by-election
- Third Link project between Quebec City and Lévis Troisième lien entre Québec et Lévis
