= Sébastien Proulx =

Canadian politician

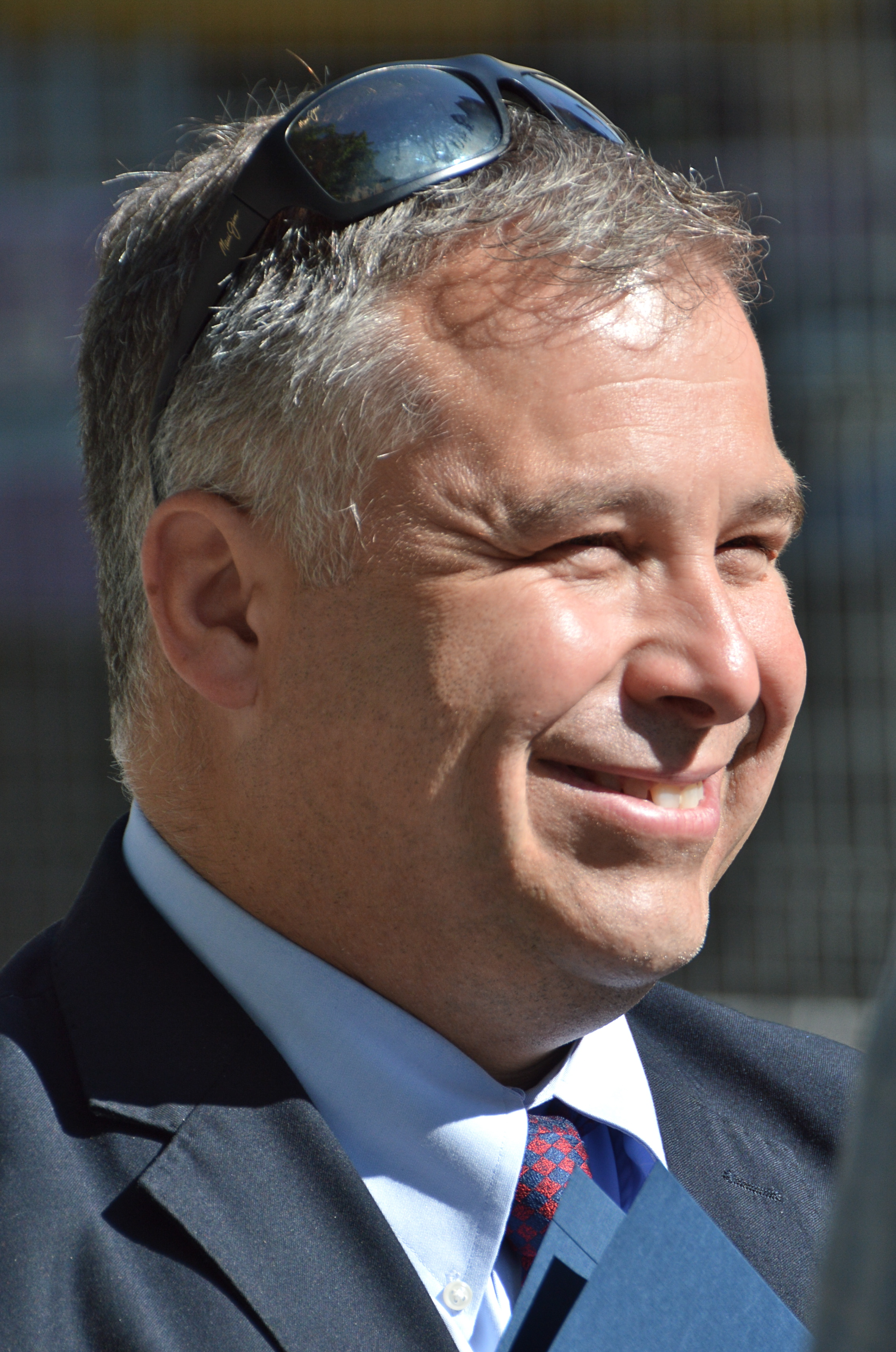
- Sébastien Proulx in 2018

Member of the National Assembly of Quebec for Jean-Talon
- In office June 8, 2015 – August 30, 2019
- Preceded by: Yves Bolduc
- Succeeded by: Joëlle Boutin

Quebec Minister of Education
- In office February 22, 2016 – October 18, 2018
- Premier: Philippe Couillard
- Preceded by: Pierre Moreau
- Succeeded by: Jean-François Roberge

Member of the National Assembly of Quebec for Trois-Rivières
- In office March 26, 2007 – December 8, 2008
- Preceded by: André Gabias
- Succeeded by: Danielle St-Amand

Personal details
- Born: March 28, 1975 (age 51) Montreal, Quebec, Canada
- Party: Quebec Liberal Party
- Other political affiliations: Action démocratique du Québec (before 2008)
- Spouse: Guylaine Roy

Sébastien Proulx (born March 28, 1975) is a Canadian politician. He was an Action démocratique du Québec (ADQ) Member of the National Assembly of Quebec (MNA) for the electoral district of Trois-Rivières from 2007 to 2008. He is a lawyer and was the main political consultant to ADQ leader Mario Dumont until his election.

== Background ==
Proulx has a bachelor's degree in law from the Université du Québec à Montréal and was admitted to the Barreau du Québec in 1999. He practised law for four years. He also worked in a consultation committee of Directeur général des élections du Québec.

Proulx first ran in the 2003 election in Laviolette, but finished third with 14 per cent of the vote behind Liberal incumbent Julie Boulet.

== Member of the Provincial Legislature ==
In the 2007 election, Proulx ran again and was elected with 37% of the vote. Liberal incumbent André Gabias, finished second with 28% of the vote. During the campaign, Proulx was one of the ADQ's main spokespersons. He was previously the director of the party in 2004.

On March 29, 2007, Proulx was appointed Official Opposition House Leader and the critic for electoral reform and parliamentary reform. On April 19, 2007, he was selected to be the Official Opposition's Shadow Minister for Access to Information.

Even though he was considered one of the ADQ's most effective parliamentarians and benefited from a high approval rating from his constituents, Proulx lost his seat as a result of the 2008 election. He finished third with 19% of the vote.

Proulx subsequently rejoined the Quebec Liberal Party, and was the party's candidate in a 2015 by-election in Jean-Talon. On June 8, he was elected deputy of Jean-Talon.

In 2016, he was appointed Minister of Education, with Hélène David being responsible for Higher Education. He served until the Liberal government was defeated in 2018.

He resigned his seat in August 2019 citing family reasons.

== Federal politics ==
Proulx campaigned on behalf of local Conservative candidate Claude Durand during the federal election of 2008.

Durand finished a distant second against Bloc Québécois incumbent Paule Brunelle in the district of Trois-Rivières.

== Electoral record ==
2007 Quebec general election: Trois-Rivières
Party	Candidate	Votes	%	±%
Action démocratique	Sébastien Proulx	10,247	37.20	
Liberal	André Gabias	7,862	28.54	
Parti Québécois	Jean-Pierre Adam	7,672	27.85	
Québec solidaire	André Lemay	907	3.29	
Green	Louis Lacroix	739	2.68	–
Independent	Stéphan Vincent	121	0.44	
Total valid votes		27,548	100.00	
Rejected and declined votes		295		
Turnout		27,843	73.49	
Electors on the lists		37,887		

2008 Quebec general election
Party	Candidate	Votes	%	±%
Liberal	Danielle St-Amand	9,129	40.10	+11.56
Parti Québécois	Yves St-Pierre	8,169	35.88	+8.03
Action démocratique	Sébastien Proulx	4,241	18.63	-18.57
Québec solidaire	Alex Noel	714	3.14	-0.15
Green	Louis Lacroix	515	2.26	-0.42
Total valid votes		22,768	98.56	–
Total rejected ballots		333	1.44	–
Turnout		23,101	60.46	–
Electors on the lists		38,209	–	–

Quebec provincial by-election, June 8, 2015 On the resignation of Yves Bolduc
Party	Candidate	Votes	%	±%
Liberal	Sébastien Proulx	8,214	41.76	-2.74
Parti Québécois	Clément Laberge	5,894	29.97	+7.49
Coalition Avenir Québec	Alain Fecteau	2,717	13.81	-6.75
Québec solidaire	Amélie Boisvert	1,503	7.64	-1.41
Option nationale	Sol Zanetti	474	2.41	+0.90
Green	Elodie Boisjoly-Dubreuil	472	2.4	–
Conservative	Sylvain Rancourt	237	1.20	+0.61
Parti des sans Parti	Sylvain Drolet	76	0.39	–
Équipe Autonomiste	Stéphane Pouleur	55	0.28	+0.09
Parti indépendantiste	Grégoire Bonneau-Fortier	27	0.14	–
Total valid votes		19,668	99.18	
Total rejected ballots		162	0.82	
Turnout		19,830	43.61	-34.39
Electors on the lists		45,475	–	
Liberal hold		Swing		-5.12

Political offices
Preceded by Diane Lemieux (PQ)	Official Opposition House Leader; 2007–2008	Succeeded by Stéphane Bédard
