= Ministry of Education and Higher Education (Quebec) =

Canadian provincial government ministry

The Ministry of Education and Higher Education (Ministère de l’Éducation et de l'Enseignement supérieur, abbreviated as MEES) was the combined government ministry of Quebec that governed education, recreation, and sports from February 27, 2015 to June 22, 2020.

The ministers of Education and of Higher Education were the individuals who had the political responsibility for the regulation and oversight of educational services offered in the province as well as for the Ministry of Education.

As of 2026, the minister of education is Sonia LeBel, and the minister of higher education is Martine Biron.

== History ==
The Ministry of Higher Education, Research and Science and the Ministry of Education, Recreation and Sports were first combined on January 28, 2016 during a reshuffle and rework of the cabinet under Philippe Couillard. The responsibility of research was transferred to the Ministry of Economy, whereas the Ministry of Education, Recreation and Sports was later split into two different functions; Education, and Recreation, Sports and the Outdoors.

On June 22, 2020, the Ministry of Education and the Ministry of Higher Education separated and succeeded the Ministry of Education and Higher Education.

== Ministers ==
Name	Title	Took office	Left office	Party
François Blais	Minister of Education, Higher Education and Research	February 27, 2015	January 28, 2016	Liberal
Pierre Moreau	Minister of Education and Higher Education	January 28, 2016	February 22, 2016	Liberal
Sébastien Proulx and Hélène David	Minister of Education, Recreation and Sports and Minister of Higher Education respectively	February 22, 2016	October 18, 2018	Liberal
Jean-François Roberge	(Until June 22, 2020) Minister of Education and Higher Education; (After June 22, 2020) Minister of Education	October 18, 2018	October 20, 2022	Coalition Avenir Québec
Joël Arseneau	Minister of National Education	October 22, 2026	—N/a	Parti Québécois
