= Pascal Paradis =

Canadian lawyer and politician (born 1971)

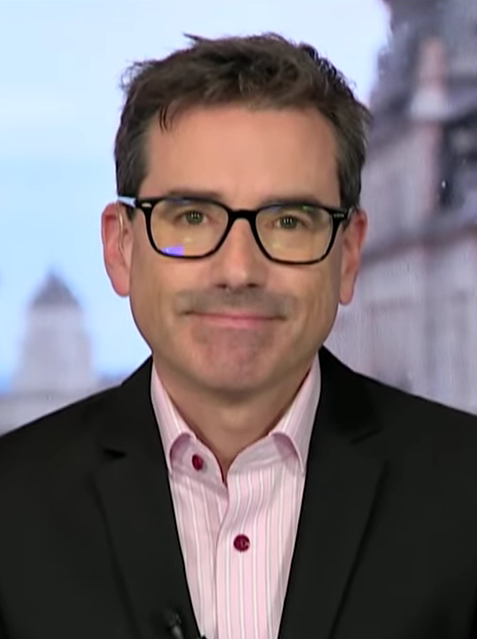
- Paradis in 2023

Member of the National Assembly of Quebec for Jean-Talon
- In office October 2, 2023 – October 5, 2026
- Preceded by: Joëlle Boutin
- Succeeded by: Julie White

Personal details
- Born: 1971 (age 54–55) Quebec City, Quebec, Canada
- Party: Parti Québécois

Pascal Paradis (French pronunciation: [paskal paʁadi]; born 1971) is a Canadian politician of the Parti Québécois (PQ) who was elected to the National Assembly of Quebec from Jean-Talon in a 2023 by-election. After being defeated in the 2026 Quebec general election, he was named chief negotiator and diplomat in the Paul St-Pierre Plamondon government.
