= Parliament of Quebec =

Legislative body of the province of Quebec, Canada

Coordinates: 46.8087°N 71.2142°W

Parliament of Quebec Parlement du Québec
- 43rd Quebec Legislature

Type
- Type: Bicameral (1867–1968); Unicameral (1968–present)
- Houses: Legislative Council (1867–1968); Legislative Assembly (1867–1968); National Assembly (1968–present)
- Sovereign: The lieutenant governor (acting in the name of the King of Canada)

History
- Founded: July 1, 1867
- Preceded by: Parliament of the Province of Canada

Meeting place
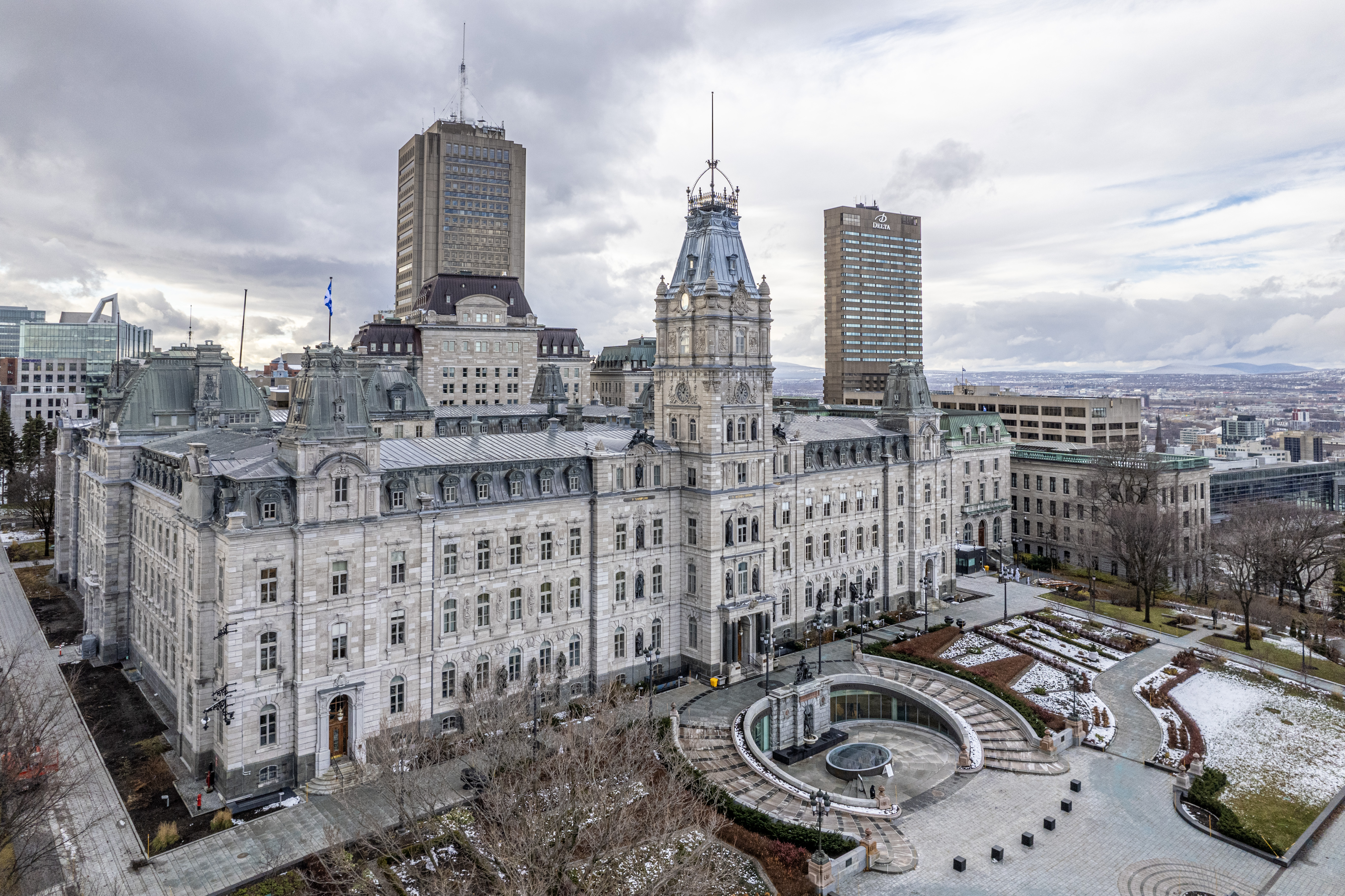
- Parliament Building, Quebec City, Quebec

The Parliament of Quebec (French: Parlement du Québec, pronounced [paʁləmɑ̃ dy kebɛk]) is the legislature of the province of Quebec, Canada. The legislature is made of two elements: the lieutenant governor of Quebec, representing the King of Canada, and the unicameral assembly called the National Assembly of Quebec. The legislature has existed since Canadian Confederation in 1867 when Quebec, previously part of the Province of Canada, became one of the founding provinces. From 1867 to 1968 the legislature was bicameral, containing a lower chamber called the Legislative Assembly of Quebec and an upper chamber called the Legislative Council of Quebec. In 1968, the legislature was renamed the Parliament of Quebec, the legislative assembly was renamed the National Assembly, and the legislative council was abolished.

Like the Canadian federal government, Quebec uses a Westminster-style parliamentary government, in which members are elected to the National Assembly after general elections and from there the party with the most seats chooses a premier of Quebec and Executive Council of Quebec. The premier is Quebec's head of government, while the King is its head of state. When the party with the most seats has fewer than half of the total number of seats, it forms a minority government, which can be voted out of power by the other parties.

Members meet in the Quebec Parliament Building in the provincial capital city of Quebec City.

== List of legislatures ==
Following is a list of the times the legislature has been convened since 1867.

- 1st Quebec Legislature: 1867–1871
- 2nd Quebec Legislature: 1871–1875
- 3rd Quebec Legislature: 1875–1878
- 4th Quebec Legislature: 1878–1881
- 5th Quebec Legislature: 1881–1886
- 6th Quebec Legislature: 1886–1890
- 7th Quebec Legislature: 1890–1892
- 8th Quebec Legislature: 1892–1897
- 9th Quebec Legislature: 1897–1900
- 10th Quebec Legislature: 1900–1904
- 11th Quebec Legislature: 1904–1908
- 12th Quebec Legislature: 1908–1912
- 13th Quebec Legislature: 1912–1916
- 14th Quebec Legislature: 1916–1919
- 15th Quebec Legislature: 1919–1923
- 16th Quebec Legislature: 1923–1927
- 17th Quebec Legislature: 1927–1931
- 18th Quebec Legislature: 1931–1935
- 19th Quebec Legislature: 1935–1936
- 20th Quebec Legislature: 1936–1939
- 21st Quebec Legislature: 1939–1944
- 22nd Quebec Legislature: 1944–1948
- 23rd Quebec Legislature: 1948–1952
- 24th Quebec Legislature: 1952–1956
- 25th Quebec Legislature: 1956–1960
- 26th Quebec Legislature: 1960–1962
- 27th Quebec Legislature: 1962–1966
- 28th Quebec Legislature: 1966–1970
- 29th Quebec Legislature: 1970–1973
- 30th Quebec Legislature: 1973–1976
- 31st Quebec Legislature: 1976–1981
- 32nd Quebec Legislature: 1981–1985
- 33rd Quebec Legislature: 1985–1989
- 34th Quebec Legislature: 1989–1994
- 35th Quebec Legislature: 1994–1998
- 36th Quebec Legislature: 1998–2003
- 37th Quebec Legislature: 2003–2007
- 38th Quebec Legislature: 2007–2008
- 39th Quebec Legislature: 2008–2012
- 40th Quebec Legislature: 2012–2014
- 41st Quebec Legislature: 2014–2018
- 42nd Quebec Legislature: 2018–2022
- 43rd Quebec Legislature: 2022–2026
- 44th Quebec Legislature: 2026–present
