= Minister for Youth Justice =

Minister for Youth Justice may refer to:

- Minister for Youth Justice (Victoria)
- Minister for Youth Justice (New South Wales)
