= Pierre Duchesne =

Lieutenant Governor of Quebec from 2007 to 2015

The Honourable Pierre Duchesne
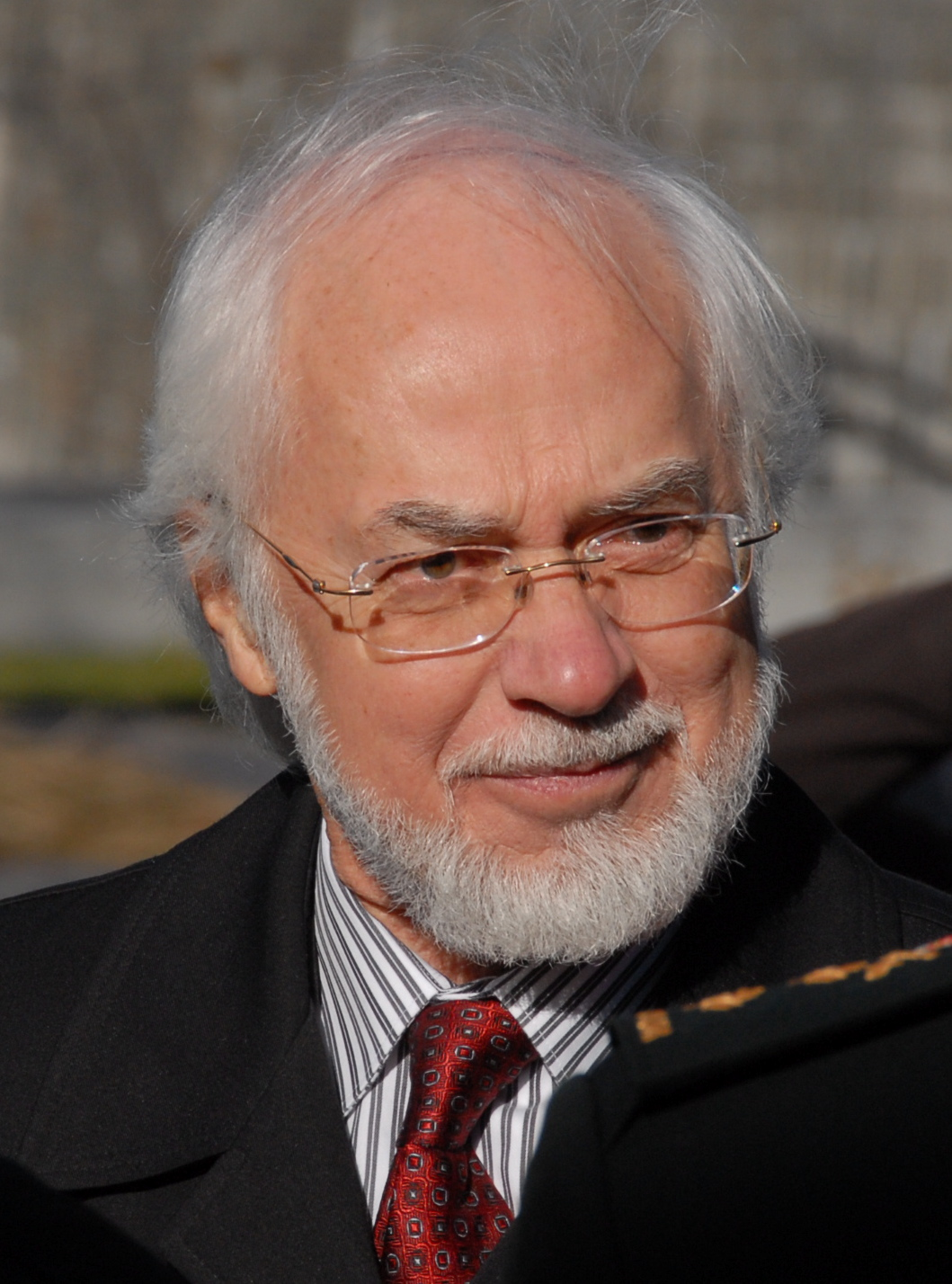
- Duchesne in 2009

28th Lieutenant Governor of Quebec
- In office June 7, 2007 – September 24, 2015
- Monarch: Elizabeth II
- Governors General: Michaëlle Jean; David Johnston
- Premier: Jean Charest; Pauline Marois; Philippe Couillard
- Preceded by: Lise Thibault
- Succeeded by: J. Michel Doyon

Personal details
- Born: February 27, 1940 (age 86) La Malbaie, Quebec, Canada
- Spouse: Ginette Lamoreux (m. 1963)
- Parent(s): Lorenzo Duchesne; Anne-Marie Bouchard
- Education: Laval University
- Profession: Notary, civil servant

Pierre Duchesne (born February 27, 1940) is a Canadian public servant who was the 28th Lieutenant Governor of Quebec and former secretary general of the National Assembly of Quebec. As lieutenant governor he was the viceregal representative of Queen Elizabeth II of Canada in the Province of Quebec. His appointment was made by Governor General of Canada Michaëlle Jean, on the Constitutional advice of Prime Minister of Canada Stephen Harper, and announced on May 18, 2007.

== Biography ==
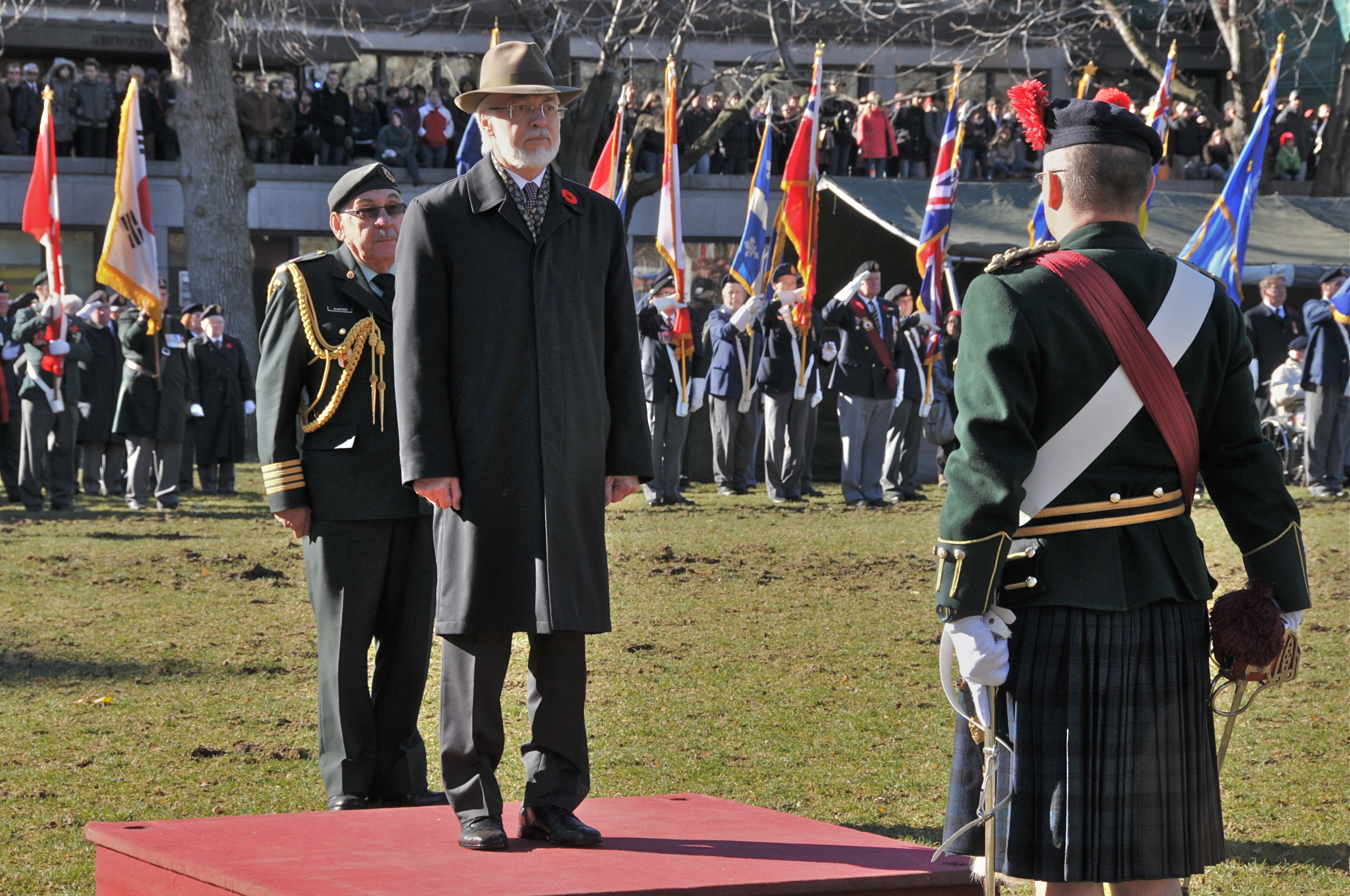
Duchesne on Remembrance Day, 2010, receiving the vice-regal salute

With a Bachelor of Arts degree from the seminary of Chicoutimi and a licentiate in law from Laval University, Duchesne became a notary in Sept-Îles in 1966.

He had worked in the National Assembly since 1974 and served as its secretary general from 1984 to 2001.

He is the author of two important publications on Quebec parliamentary procedure, Recueil des décisions concernant la procédure parlementaire and La Procédure parlementaire du Québec.

On May 18, 2007, he was announced by Prime Minister Stephen Harper as the next Lieutenant Governor of Quebec, replacing outgoing Lieutenant Governor Lise Thibault. He was sworn in on June 7, 2007.

=== Arms ===
Coat of arms of Pierre Duchesne
Notes The arms of Pierre Duchesne consist of: Adopted March 20, 2009 Crest A crane Or beaked and membered Gules, its dexter foot holding a paint brush Azure bristled Or Supporters Two bloodhounds proper standing on a rocky mount Or Motto CONFIDE TIBI ET PERSEVERA (Have confidence in yourself and persevere) Symbolism The shield shows an oak tree which refers to Duchesne's surname meaning "of the oak"; with the three roots symbolizing his children and the seven acorns symbolizing future descendants. The crane (grue) represents L'Isle-aux-Grues, Quebec, symbolizing Duchesne's attachment to that location and to Quebec as a whole, and holds a paint brush symbolizing Duchesne's support for the arts. The horizontal blue band represents the rule of law, alluding to Duchesne's previous roles as a notary and as Secretary General of the National Assembly, and the indented lines on the shield and rocky terrain of the supporters represent the Charlevoix region.
