= J. Michel Doyon =

Lieutenant Governor of Quebec from 2015 to 2024

The Honourable J. Michel Doyon KC AdE
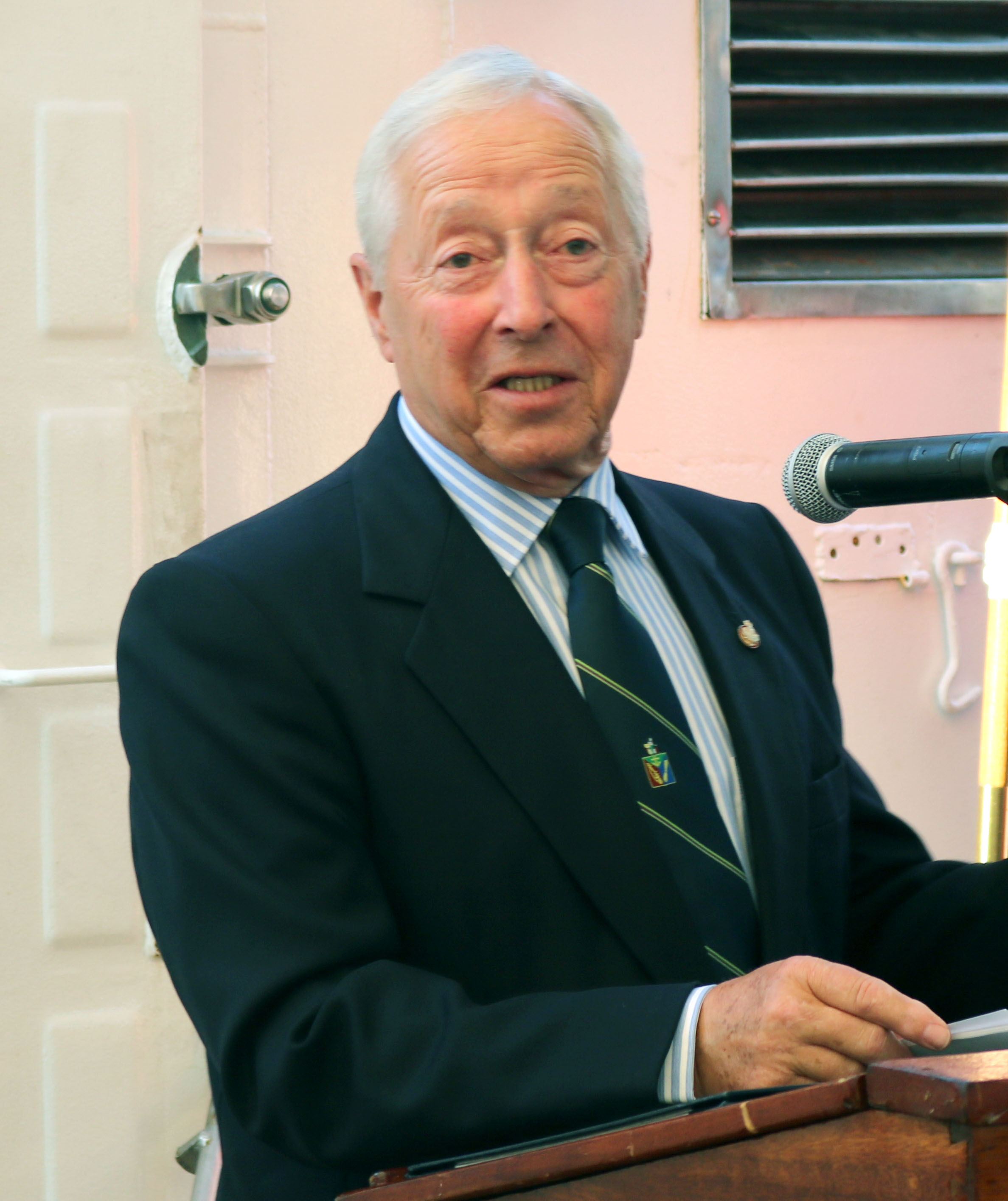
- Doyon in 2017

29th Lieutenant Governor of Quebec
- In office September 24, 2015 – January 25, 2024
- Monarchs: Elizabeth II; Charles III
- Governors General: David Johnston; Julie Payette; Mary Simon
- Premier: Philippe Couillard; François Legault
- Preceded by: Pierre Duchesne
- Succeeded by: Manon Jeannotte

Personal details
- Born: Joseph Michel Doyon; April 22, 1943 (age 83) Quebec City, Quebec, Canada
- Spouse: Pauline Théberge (m. 1966)
- Education: Laurentian University; Laval University
- Profession: Lawyer; historian; professor; author

Joseph Michel Doyon KC AdE (born April 22, 1943) is a Canadian lawyer, historian, and author who served as the 29th lieutenant governor of Quebec. He assumed office on September 24, 2015 and was succeeded by Manon Jeannotte on January 25, 2024. Doyon previously served as the 144th head of the Bar of Quebec for the 2007–2008 term.

== Biography ==
Doyon has a Bachelor of Arts from Laurentian University, a Licentiate in Law, a Master of Arts in History and a Doctorate in History from Laval University. Before practicing law, he taught at the Cégep de Sainte-Foy and lectured at Laurentian University, Laval University and the Bar School of the Barreau du Québec.

Doyon practiced law at Gagné, Letarte for more than 30 years and has extensive experience in business law and commercial arbitration. He has also served as President of the Barreau.

Doyon was appointed King's Counsel (Queen's Counsel until the death of Queen Elizabeth II and King's Counsel since then) and has served as Honorary Colonel of 3 Wing Bagotville. He is a governor of that regiment. He is also an Advocatus Emeritus of the Barreau du Québec and a Knight of Justice and Vice-Prior of the Most Venerable Order of the Hospital of St. John of Jerusalem. He has received several medals, including the 125th Anniversary of the Confederation of Canada Medal, the Queen Elizabeth II Golden Jubilee Medal, and the Queen Elizabeth II Diamond Jubilee Medal.

On July 21, 2015, he was announced by Prime Minister Stephen Harper as the next Lieutenant Governor of Quebec, replacing outgoing Lieutenant Governor Pierre Duchesne. Doyon recited his oath as the new lieutenant governor on September 24, 2015, in the Legislative Council chamber of the Parliament of Québec, in a ceremony that was boycotted by the opposition Parti Québécois.

On November 15, 2016, he received a Grant of Arms and Supporters, along with differences for Jean-François Doyon and Marie-Hélène Doyon.

=== Honours ===
Ribbon bars of the Honourable J. Michel Doyon

Date	Description	Notes
2016	Most Venerable Order of the Hospital of Saint John of Jerusalem	Appointed Knight of Justice in 2016; Appointed Commander in 2015; Appointed Member in 2002
2012	Queen Elizabeth II Diamond Jubilee Medal	Decoration awarded in 2012; Canadian version
2009	Emeritus Lawyer of the Bar of Québec	
2005	Governor of the 3 Wing Bagotville	
2002	Queen Elizabeth II Golden Jubilee Medal	Decoration awarded in 2002; Canadian version
1999; 2004	Honorary Colonel of 3 Wing Bagotville	
1997	Fellow of the Société napoléonienne internationale	
1992	125th Anniversary of the Confederation of Canada Medal	Decoration awarded in 1992
1992	King's Counsel (formerly Queen's Counsel)	KC (QC until the death of Queen Elizabeth II, and KC since then)

=== Arms ===
Coat of arms of J. Michel Doyon
Notes Granted 15 November 2016. Crest A partridge close Azure crowned with a coronet flory and holding in its beak an annulet Or. Escutcheon Per pale Azure and Or semé of annulets counterchanged, on a chief Argent a fleur-de-lis between two olive branches Azure. Supporters Two dog-horses per fess nebuly Or and Azure each holding a rod ensigned with an annulet Or and resting on a stack of books both standing on a wheat field Proper. Motto Respect Engagement Équité
