= Minister for Youth Protection and Rehabilitation (Quebec) =

Province of Quebec government minister

The Minister of Youth Protection and Rehabilitation (Quebec) (French: Ministre déléguée à la Protection de la jeunesse et à la Réadaptation) is responsible for the protection of youths and youth legal affairs in the province of Quebec.

In Québec, the Charter of Human Rights and Freedoms recognizes the fundamental rights and freedoms of all individuals, whatever their age. These rights include:

- the right to life and personal security;
- the right to personal inviolability and freedom;
- the right to receive assistance when their life is in peril.

In addition, the Charter specifically recognizes that every child has a right to the protection, security and attention that his or her parents, or the persons acting in their stead, are capable of providing.

The Youth Protection Act came into force in 1979. In 1995, the Commission, in addition to the duties defined in the Charter of Human Rights and Freedoms, was made responsible for taking action to ensure respect for the rights of children and adolescents, as defined in the Youth Protection Act.

The Youth Criminal Justice Act applies to young people aged 12 to 17 who commit an offence under the Criminal Code or another federal law (theft, vandalism, break and enter, possession of drugs, etc.).
