= Nancy Guillemette =

Canadian politician

Member of the National Assembly of Quebec for Roberval
- In office December 10, 2018 – August 27, 2026
- Preceded by: Philippe Couillard
- Succeeded by: William Fradette

Personal details
- Born: 1967 or 1968 (age 57–58)
- Party: Coalition Avenir Québec
- Children: 3

Nancy Guillemette is a Canadian politician who served as the member of the National Assembly of Quebec for the riding of Roberval from 2018 to 2026 as a member of the Coalition Avenir Québec. She also served as a municipal councillor in Roberval, Quebec from 2009 to 2017.

== Early life ==
Guillemette was born in 1967 or 1968. She holds certificates in human resources, mental health, and organizational psychology from the Université du Québec à Chicoutimi.

Before entering politics, Guillemette worked as a manager at Créations Ny-na from 1985 to 1994 and as a clinical coordinator at Clinique Dentaire Philippe Gosselin from 1994 to 2008. From 2008 to 2018, she worked as a general manager at Santé mentale Québec in Lac-Saint-Jean.

Guillemette served as campaign manager for Michel Larouche in the Roberval mayoral election. She also worked on Denis Lebel's campaign team when he ran in the 2007 Roberval—Lac-Saint-Jean by-election.

== Political career ==
Guillemette served two terms as a municipal councillor in Roberval, Quebec from 2009 to 2017. She did not seek a third term, citing disagreements with then-mayor Guy Larouche. She also served as a councillor for the Le Domaine-du-Roy Regional County Municipality from 2013 to 2017.

Guillemette was elected to represent the riding of Roberval in the National Assembly of Quebec as a member of the Coalition Avenir Québec in a by-election on December 10, 2018. The seat had been left vacant following the resignation of Philippe Couillard. She was re-elected in the 2022 election.

Following her re-election in 2022, Guillemette served as assistant government whip from 2022 to 2026. She also served as parliamentary assistant to the Minister Responsible for Seniors and Caregivers in 2026.

On April 7, 2026, Guillemette announced she would not seek re-election in the 2026 general election.

== Personal life ==
Guillemette has three children.

== Electoral record ==
2022 Quebec general election: Roberval
Party	Candidate	Votes	%	±%
Coalition Avenir Québec	Nancy Guillemette	15,017	56.19	+1.66
Parti Québécois	Patrice Bouchard	5,488	20.53	+3.02
Conservative	Samuel Gaudreault	3,038	11.37	+10.24
Québec solidaire	Michaël Ottereyes	1,826	6.83	–3.49
Liberal	Maxim Lavoie	1,217	4.55	–10.66
Climat Québec	Lynda Lalancette	141	0.53	New
Total valid votes		26,727	98.77	
Total rejected ballots		334	1.23	+0.68
Turnout		27,061	60.78	+26.11
Electors on the lists		44,525		
Coalition Avenir Québec hold		Swing		–0.68
Source: Élections Québec

Quebec provincial by-election, December 10, 2018 Resignation of Philippe Couillard
Party	Candidate	Votes	%	±%
Coalition Avenir Québec	Nancy Guillemette	8,369	54.53	+30.37
Parti Québécois	Thomas Gaudreault	2,688	17.51	-1.51
Liberal	William Laroche	2,334	15.21	-27.25
Québec solidaire	Luc-Antoine Cauchon	1,584	10.32	-0.38
Conservative	Carl C. Lamontagne	172	1.13	-0.60
Citoyens au pouvoir	Julie Boucher	121	0.79	-0.31
Green	Alex Tyrrell	80	0.52	–
Total valid votes		15,384	99.45	
Total rejected ballots		85	0.55	-0.89
Turnout		15,433	34.67	-28.72
Electors on the list		44,509		
Coalition Avenir Québec gain from Liberal		Swing		+28.81
