= Philippe Couillard =

Premier of Quebec from 2014 to 2018

The Honourable Philippe Couillard PC
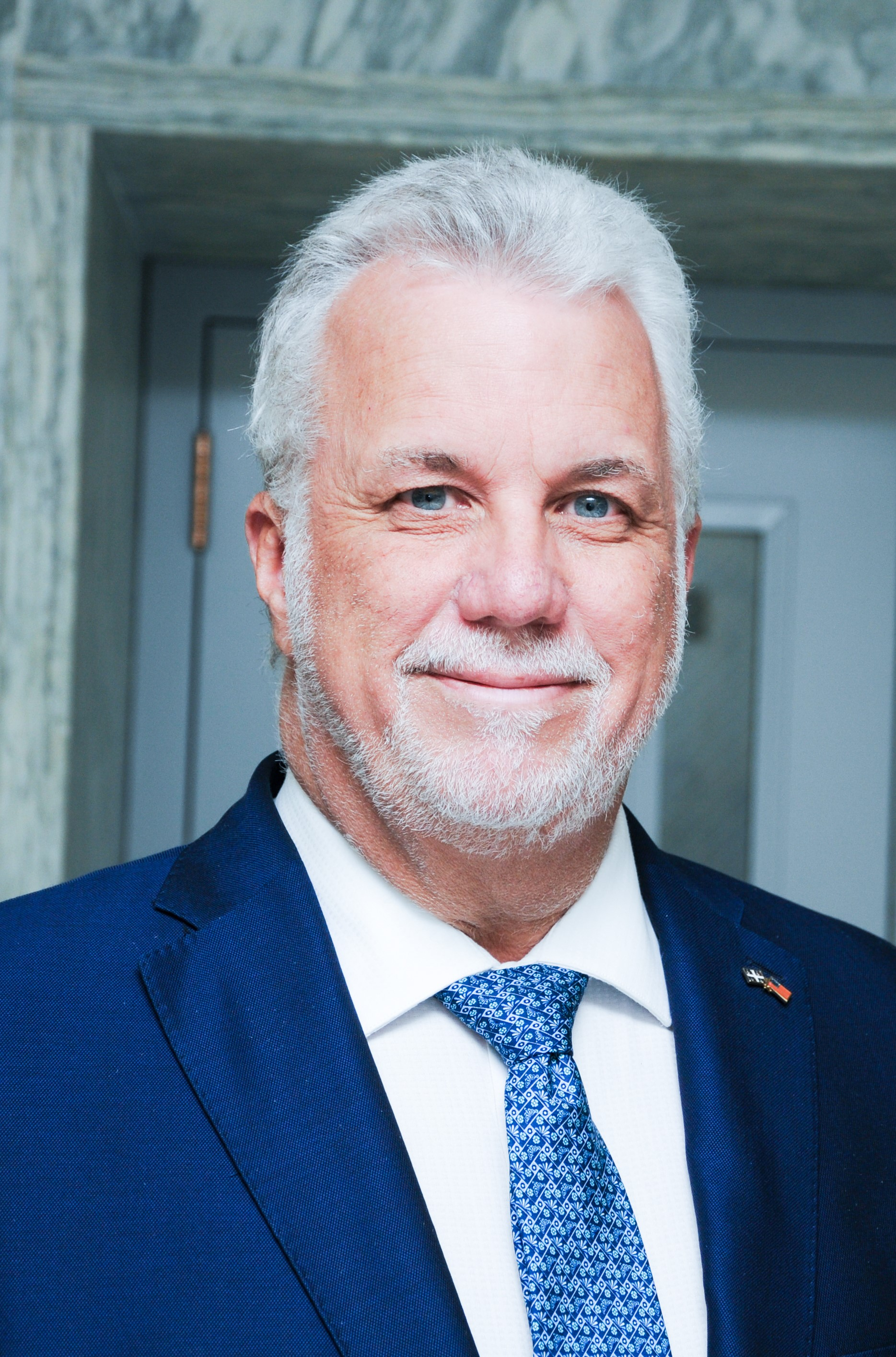
- Couillard in 2018

31st Premier of Quebec
- In office April 23, 2014 – October 18, 2018
- Monarch: Elizabeth II
- Lieutenant Governor: Pierre Duchesne; J. Michel Doyon
- Deputy: Lise Thériault; Dominique Anglade
- Preceded by: Pauline Marois
- Succeeded by: François Legault

Leader of the Opposition in Quebec
- In office December 18, 2013 – April 23, 2014
- Preceded by: Jean-Marc Fournier
- Succeeded by: Stéphane Bédard

Leader of the Quebec Liberal Party
- In office March 17, 2013 – October 4, 2018
- Preceded by: Jean Charest
- Succeeded by: Pierre Arcand (interim)
Quebec Executive Council
Minister of Health and Social Services
In office April 29, 2003 – June 25, 2008
Premier	Jean Charest
Preceded by	François Legault
Succeeded by	Yves Bolduc
Parliamentary constituencies
Member of the National Assembly
In office April 7, 2014 – October 4, 2018
Preceded by	Denis Trottier
Succeeded by	Nancy Guillemette
Constituency	Roberval
In office December 18, 2013 – April 7, 2014
Preceded by	Raymond Bachand
Succeeded by	Hélène David
Constituency	Outremont
In office March 26, 2007 – June 25, 2008
Preceded by	Margaret F. Delisle
Succeeded by	Yves Bolduc
Constituency	Jean-Talon
In office April 14, 2003 – March 26, 2007
Preceded by	André Tranchemontagne
Succeeded by	Pierre Arcand
Constituency	Mont-Royal

Personal details
- Born: June 26, 1957 (age 69) Montreal, Quebec, Canada
- Party: Liberal
- Spouse: Suzanne Pilote
- Education: Université de Montréal
- Occupation: Politician; neurosurgeon; consultant; professor

Philippe Couillard PC (French: [filip kujɑːʁ]; born June 26, 1957) is a Canadian business advisor and former neurosurgeon, university professor and politician who served as 31st premier of Quebec from 2014 to 2018. Between 2003 and 2008, he was Quebec's Minister of Health and Social Services in Jean Charest's Liberal government and was MNA for Mont-Royal until he resigned in 2008. In the 2014 election, Couillard moved to the riding of Roberval, where he resides. He was the leader of the Quebec Liberal Party from 2013 to 2018. He resigned as Liberal leader and MNA on October 4, 2018. He joined public affairs consulting firm StrategyCorp as a senior advisor in 2023.

== Background and early life ==
Couillard was born in Montreal, Quebec, the son of Canadian-born Joseph Alfred Jean Pierre Couillard de Lespinay and French-born Hélène Yvonne Pardé. He holds a medical degree and a certification in neurosurgery from the Université de Montréal. He was the head of the department of neurosurgery at Hôpital Saint-Luc from 1989 to 1992 and again at the Centre hospitalier universitaire de Sherbrooke from 1996 to 2003. From 1992 to 1996, he practised in Dhahran, Saudi Arabia.

== Political career ==
In 2003, Couillard left the medical profession to run for the Montreal-area seat of Mont-Royal in the National Assembly, representing the Quebec Liberal Party. He was elected in the 2003 election and was appointed Minister of Health and Social Services on April 29, 2003.

After taking office, he proved skillful in the handling of his department's public relations and was regarded by some as the most popular minister in the Charest government. His accomplishments during his tenure included a $4.2 billion increase in the Quebec health budget, the prohibition of smoking in public places, and a reduction in the number of union local accreditations in the health sector.

In 2007, Couillard ran in the riding of Jean-Talon in the Quebec City area, replacing Margaret Delisle who did not seek re-election for health reasons. Couillard won his seat in the 2007 election despite the Action démocratique du Québec's (ADQ) strong performance in the region in which the party gained the majority of the seats. Pierre Arcand succeeded Couillard in the Mont-Royal riding. Couillard was reappointed as minister of health and social services, as well as minister responsible for the provincial Capitale-Nationale (Quebec) region.

On June 25, 2008, Couillard announced his resignation as minister and MNA. He was succeeded as minister and Jean-Talon MNA by locally-known Alma doctor Yves Bolduc.

On June 23, 2010, Couillard was appointed to the Security Intelligence Review Committee and consequently became a member of the Privy Council.

On October 3, 2012, Couillard became the third person to enter the leadership election to succeed Jean Charest as leader of the Quebec Liberal Party. When asked why he was re-entering politics, he said, "I feel the need to serve."

On March 17, 2013, Couillard became the leader of the Quebec Liberal Party, beating ex-cabinet ministers Raymond Bachand and Pierre Moreau. On December 9, 2013, he was elected MNA for the safe Liberal seat of Outremont after Bachand stood down from the seat in his favour.

=== 2014 election ===
On March 5, 2014, amid weeks of speculation that the Parti Québécois would call a snap election, Lieutenant Governor Pierre Duchesne dropped the writs for a general election at the request of Premier Pauline Marois. Couillard opted to run in the riding of Roberval, where he now lives, handing Outremont to star candidate Hélène David.

When the election campaign began, polls showed a close race between the Parti Québécois and the Liberals. However, the PQ held a wide lead among francophone voters, giving the advantage in terms of seat distribution to the PQ. Couillard stated that his campaign would focus on "healthcare, education and jobs". He also accused premier Pauline Marois of mismanaging Quebec's economy and also clarified his opposition to the Quebec Charter of Values, describing it as "an unnecessary bill that succeeds only in dividing Quebecers".

Over the course of the next couple of weeks, the polls began to break heavily in the favour of Couillard and the Liberals as the PQ began to bleed support to all 3 major opposition parties. His second debate performance was not as strong as his first one, and he was criticized by both Pauline Marois and François Legault of the Coalition Avenir Québec for suggesting that a factory worker in Quebec ought to be bilingual in the event that an Anglophone businessperson was to walk on the floor. While his comment was portrayed by his critics as proof that he was soft on the French language issue, his poll numbers continued to exceed those of his opponents.

On April 7, Couillard led the Quebec Liberals to a sweeping victory, winning 70 seats in the National Assembly and a return to government a mere 19 months after being ousted in one of their poorest election showings in the party's history. The Liberals even managed to unseat Marois in her own riding. On election night, Couillard stressed the importance of creating a better business climate in Quebec and doing away with some of the divisive policies that had characterized Marois' tenure as premier. He also pledged to work cooperatively with other provinces and the federal government and to reassert Quebec's place as a leader in the Canadian federation.

== Premier of Quebec ==
Returning the Liberal Party of Quebec back to a majority government, after an eighteen-month stint led by Pauline Marois and the Parti Quebecois, Couillard assumed office on April 23, 2014, naming 26 ministers to his cabinet.

=== Economic policy ===
After the Liberals were elected in April 2014, the budget deficit was nearly $6 billion. Couillard's government and his finance minister, Carlos Leitão, balanced the budget only one year later in 2015 through spending cuts and raising taxes. Couillard's government ran four consecutive balanced budgets during his tenure as premier. However, his cuts to education and healthcare spending caused his popularity to decline. In 2015, he announced the Réseau express métropolitain.

=== Environment ===
Couillard's government removed protection of several preserved areas while authorizing logging in caribou land. The government claimed that this decision would grow the economy and jobs.

In 2014, Couillard announced his opposition to the development of shale gas, citing a report that raised environmental concerns.

=== Religious symbols ===
In October 2017, Couillard's government passed Bill 62, a Quebec ban on face covering. This law gained national and international attention, as Muslim women who wear a niqab or burqa would have to remove their religious garments to uncover their face to access public services. Couillard supported the law, saying "We are in a free and democratic society. You speak to me, I should see your face, and you should see mine. It's as simple as that."

=== 2018 election ===
Couillard's government was ousted after only one term by the Coalition Avenir Québec in the October 2018 provincial election. Couillard himself easily won reelection in Roberval. He resigned as party leader and MNA on October 4, 2018.

=== Ministry ===
Ministry following the 2014 election:

Portfolio	Minister	
Premier and Minister responsible for the Saguenay-Lac-Saint-Jean Region	Philippe Couillard	(2014-2018)
Deputy Premier and Minister of Public Security	Lise Thériault	(2014-2017)
Minister of State for Canadian Intergovernmental Affairs and the Canadian Francophonie and Minister Responsible for Access to Information and Reform of Democratic Institutions	Jean-Marc Fournier	(2014-2016)
Minister of Culture and Communications and Minister Responsible for the Protection and Promotion of the French Language	Hélène David	(2014-2016)
Minister of Finance	Carlos Leitão	(2014-2018)
Minister of Justice; Minister Responsible for the Status of Women and Minister responsible for the Outaouais Region	Stéphanie Vallée	(2014-2018)
Minister Responsible for Government Administration and Ongoing Program Review and President of the Treasury Board	Martin Coiteux	(2014-2016)
Minister of the Economy, Innovation and Exports	Jacques Daoust	(2014-2016)
Minister of International Relations and the Francophonie	Christine St-Pierre	(2014-2018)
Minister of Municipal Affairs and Land Occupancy and Minister Responsible for the Montérégie Region	Pierre Moreau	(2014-2016)
Minister of Education, Recreation and Sports; Minister of Higher Education, Research, and Science and Minister Responsible for Côte-Nord Region	Yves Bolduc	(2014-2015)
Minister of Immigration, Diversity and Inclusiveness	Kathleen Weil	(2014-2017)
Minister of Health and Social Services	Gaétan Barrette	(2014-2018)
Minister of Families; Minister responsible for Seniors and Minister responsible for the Laval Region	Francine Charbonneau	(2014-2016)
Minister of Sustainable Development, the Environment, and the Fight Against Climate Change	David Heurtel	(2014-2017)
Minister of Agriculture, Fisheries and Food and Minister Responsible for the Estrie Region	Pierre Paradis	(2014-2017)
Minister of Tourism and Minister Responsible for the Chaudière-Appalaches Region	Dominique Vien	(2014-2016)
Minister of Transport and Minister Responsible for the Montreal Region	Robert Poëti	(2014-2016)
Minister of Labour and Minister responsible for the Capitale-Nationale Region	Sam Hamad	(2014-2016)
Minister of Natural Resources; Minister Responsible for the Northern Plan; Minister responsible for the Lanaudière Region; Minister responsible for the Laurentides Region	Pierre Arcand	(2014-2017)
Minister of Forests, Wildlife and Parks and Minister Responsible for the Centre-du-Québec Region	Laurent Lessard	(2014-2016)
Minister for Aboriginal Affairs	Geoffrey Kelley	(2014-2018)
Minister for Transport and the Implementation of the Maritime Strategy; Minister Responsible for the Bas-Saint-Laurent Region and Minister Responsible for the Gaspésie—Îles-de-la-Madeleine Region	Jean D'Amour	(2014-2016)
Minister of State for Rehabilitation, Youth Protection and Public Health	Lucie Charlebois	(2014-2018)
Minister for Mines; Minister Responsible for the Abitibi-Témiscamingue Region and Minister Responsible for the Nord-du-Québec Region	Luc Blanchette	(2014-2016)
Minister for Small and Medium Enterprises, Regulatory Streamlining and Regional Economic Development and Minister Responsible for the Mauricie Region	Jean-Denis Girard	(2014-2016)
Non-Ministerial Roles
Role	Member	
Chief Government Whip	Stéphane Billette	(2014-2017)

== After politics ==
In September 2022, Couillard was reported to be involved with the Canadian activities of a UK-based company Britishvolt, lobbying to build a gigafactory in Canada. However, by the end of November 2022, the company was reported to have abandoned its ambitions to build a factory in Canada; Couillard reportedly ceased working for Britishvolt in October 2022.

== Electoral record ==
2018 Quebec general election: Roberval
Party	Candidate	Votes	%	±%
Liberal	Philippe Couillard	11,807	42.46	-12.72
Coalition Avenir Québec	Denise Trudel	6,719	24.16	+17.23
Parti Québécois	Thomas Gaudreault	5,290	19.02	-14.31
Québec solidaire	Luc-Antoine Cauchon	2,975	10.70	+7.55
Conservative	Carl Lamontagne	478	1.72	
Citoyens au pouvoir	Julie Boucher	305	1.10	+0.36
Parti nul	Lynda Lalancette	236	0.85	
Total valid votes		27,810	98.56	
Total rejected ballots		407	1.44	
Turnout		28,217	63.39	
Eligible voters		44,511		
Liberal hold		Swing		-14.98
Source(s) "Rapport des résultats officiels du scrutin". Élections Québec.

2014 Quebec general election: Roberval
Party	Candidate	Votes	%	±%
Liberal	Philippe Couillard	17,816	55.17	+26.79
Parti Québécois	Denis Trottier	10,764	33.33	-13.37
Coalition Avenir Québec	François Truchon	2,239	6.93	-12.45
Québec solidaire	Guillaume Néron	1,018	3.15	-0.88
Parti des sans Parti	Julie Boucher	237	0.73	–
Option nationale	Luc-Antoine Cauchon	218	0.68	-0.83
Total valid votes		32,292	98.95	–
Total rejected ballots		342	1.05	–
Turnout		32,634	72.29	-0.30
Electors on the lists		45,143	–	–
Liberal gain from Parti Québécois		Swing		+20.08

Quebec provincial by-election, December 9, 2013: Outremont
Party	Candidate	Votes	%	±%
Liberal	Philippe Couillard	5,582	55.11	+13.59
Québec solidaire	Édith Laperle	3,264	32.23	+14.21
Option nationale	Julie Surprenant	677	6.68	+4.97
Green	Alex Tyrrell	384	3.79	–
Conservative	Pierre Ennio Crespi	145	1.43	–
Parti nul	Mathieu Marcil	59	0.58	-0.34
Autonomist Team	Guy Boivin	17	0.17	–
Total valid votes		10,128	99.13	–
Total rejected ballots		89	0.87	–
Turnout		10,217	26.42	-41.79
Electors on the lists		38,671	–	–
Liberal hold		Swing		-0.41

2007 Quebec general election: Jean-Talon
Party	Candidate	Votes	%	±%
Liberal	Philippe Couillard	13,732	41.96	-4.64
Parti Québécois	Véronique Hivon	9,859	30.13	-5.23
Action démocratique	Luc de la Sablonnière	6,056	18.51	+3.34
Green	Ali Dahan	1,518	4.64	+3.23
Québec solidaire	Bill Clennett	1,463	4.47	+2.95*
Christian Democracy	Francis Denis	95	0.29	-

* Increase is from the Union des forces progressistes (UFP)

2003 Quebec general election: Mont-Royal
Party	Candidate	Votes	%	±%
Liberal	Philippe Couillard	21,021	80.91	+0.67
Parti Québécois	Vincent Gagnon	3,465	13.34	+0.60
Action démocratique	Nour-Eddine Hajibi	1,240	4.77	+1.23
Equality	Frank Kiss	256	0.99	−0.90
