= Hélène David =

Canadian politician

Doctor Hélène David

Member of the National Assembly of Quebec for Outremont
- In office April 7, 2014 – August 23, 2018
- Preceded by: Philippe Couillard
- Succeeded by: riding redistributed

Member of the National Assembly of Quebec for Marguerite-Bourgeoys
- In office October 1, 2018 – August 28, 2022
- Preceded by: Robert Poëti
- Succeeded by: Fred Beauchemin

Minister of Higher Education
- In office February 22, 2016 – October 18, 2018
- Preceded by: Pierre Duchesne
- Succeeded by: Jean-François Roberge

Minister of Culture and Communications
- In office April 23, 2014 – February 22, 2016
- Preceded by: Maka Kotto
- Succeeded by: Luc Fortin

Personal details
- Born: December 13, 1953 (age 72) Montreal, Quebec
- Party: Liberal
- Parent(s): Paul David; Nellie Maillard
- Relatives: Pierre David (brother); Françoise David (sister)
- Profession: Professor

Hélène David (born 1953) is a Canadian politician, who was elected to the National Assembly of Quebec in the 2014 provincial election. She represented the electoral district of Outremont from 2014 to 2018, and represented the district of Marguerite-Bourgeoys from 2018 to 2022, as a member of the Quebec Liberal Party. David was Minister of Culture and Communications and Minister Responsible for the Protection and Promotion of the French Language from 2014 to 2016 in the Couillard government, then Minister Responsible for Higher Education from 2016 to 2018.

== Biography ==
David was born, raised and educated in Outremont. She holds a PhD in clinical psychology from the Université de Montréal. In 1984 she started to work as an instructor in psychopathology and women's and maternal issues. She is also a member of various university committees, overseer of psychology graduate programs, deputy director of the Department of Psychology, and vice-rector of academic affairs, international relations, and the Francophonie at the university.

From 2008 to 2010 she was assistant deputy minister for higher education in the Ministry of Education, Recreation and Sports under then-Premier Jean Charest.

She received the Simone Chouinard Award from the Montreal Heart Institute Research Centre, and the International Cesare Sacerdoti Award from the International Psychoanalytical Association. In 1977 became a member of the Quebec College of Psychologists, and served for many years on the board of the Montreal Heart Institute.

== Personal life ==
She is the younger sister of Françoise David, a member of the National Assembly for the Québec solidaire party from 2012 to 2017. When asked about her sister, she said that the two have "known for a long time that we're not necessarily from the same political family." Hélène is a federalist, while Françoise is a sovereigntist. However, Hélène shares Françoise's staunch feminism; she considers herself "allergic to all domination of women by men."

Her other siblings include Pierre David, a film producer, and Charles-Philippe David, a political science professor at the Université du Québec à Montréal.

Her father is Paul David, a former cardiologist and PC Senator under former Prime Minister Brian Mulroney.

On February 22, 2016, she became Minister of Higher Education.
