= Joëlle Boutin =

Canadian politician (born 1979)

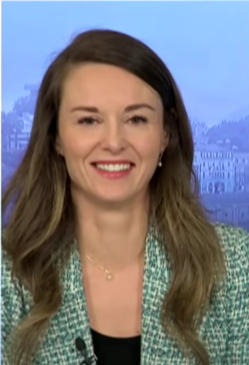
- Boutin in 2024

Member of the National Assembly of Quebec for Jean-Talon
- In office December 2, 2019 – July 19, 2023
- Preceded by: Sébastien Proulx
- Succeeded by: Pascal Paradis

Personal details
- Born: October 2, 1979 (age 47) Dolbeau, Quebec, Canada
- Party: Coalition Avenir Québec

Joëlle Boutin (French pronunciation: [ʒɔɛl butɛ̃]; born October 2, 1979) is a Canadian former politician who was elected to the National Assembly of Quebec in a by-election on December 2, 2019. She represented the electoral district of Jean-Talon as a member of the Coalition Avenir Québec. She resigned on July 19, 2023, to join the private sector. The by-election to replace her was scheduled for October 2, 2023, which was won by the Parti Québécois candidate Pascal Paradis.

== Electoral record ==
2022 Quebec general election: Jean-Talon
Party	Candidate	Votes	%	±%
Coalition Avenir Québec	Joëlle Boutin	11,105	32.50	-10.88
Québec solidaire	Olivier Bolduc	8,117	23.76	+6.81
Parti Québécois	Gabriel Coulombe	6,386	18.69	+9.37
Liberal	Julie White	4,616	13.51	-11.52
Conservative	Sébastien Clavet	3,541	10.36	+9.35
Green	Alexandre Dallaire	262	0.77	-2.02
Climat Québec	Julien Cardinal	93	0.27	–
Équipe Autonomiste	Stéphane Pouleur	44	0.13	+0.03
Total valid votes		34,164	99.02	–
Total rejected ballots		337	0.98	+0.50
Turnout		34,501	73.86	+24.67
Electors on the lists		46,714	–	–
Coalition Avenir Québec hold		Swing		-8.84

Quebec provincial by-election, December 2, 2019 On the resignation of Sébastien Proulx
Party	Candidate	Votes	%	±%
Coalition Avenir Québec	Joëlle Boutin	9,950	43.38	+14.81
Liberal	Gertrude Bourdon	5,742	25.03	-7.54
Québec solidaire	Olivier Bolduc	3,888	16.95	-2.22
Parti Québécois	Sylvain Barrette	2,137	9.32	-5.14
Green	Émilie Coulombe	640	2.79	+0.99
Conservative	Éric Barnabé	233	1.02	-0.81
Independent	Ali Dahan	206	0.90	+0.20
Citoyens au pouvoir	Stéphane Blais	85	0.37	-
Indépendance du Québec	Michel Blondin	32	0.14	-
Équipe Autonomiste	Stéphane Pouleur	23	0.10	-0.48
Total valid votes		22,936	99.53	
Total rejected ballots		109	0.47	-0.71
Turnout		23,045	49.18	-25.98
Electors on the lists		46,857	–	
Coalition Avenir Québec gain from Liberal		Swing		+11.18

2018 Quebec general election: Jean-Talon
Party	Candidate	Votes	%	±%
Liberal	Sébastien Proulx	11,069	32.58	-9.18
Coalition Avenir Québec	Joëlle Boutin	9,706	28.57	+14.75
Québec solidaire	Patrick Provost	6,515	19.18	+11.53
Parti Québécois	Sylvain Barrette	4,912	14.46	-15.51
Conservative	Carl Bérubé	620	1.82	+0.62
Green	Macarena Diab	610	1.8	-0.6
Independent	Ali Dahan	236	0.69	
New Democratic	Hamid Nadji	197	0.58	
Équipe Autonomiste	Stéphane Pouleur	64	0.19	-0.09
Marxist–Leninist	Ginette Boutet	46	0.14	-0.48
Total valid votes		33,975	98.82	
Total rejected ballots		405	1.18	
Turnout		34,380	75.16	
Eligible voters		45,743		
Liberal hold		Swing		-11.97
Source(s) "Rapport des résultats officiels du scrutin". Élections Québec.
