= Fréchette ministry =

Government of Quebec in 2026

- 33rd ministry of Quebec
- 2026–2026
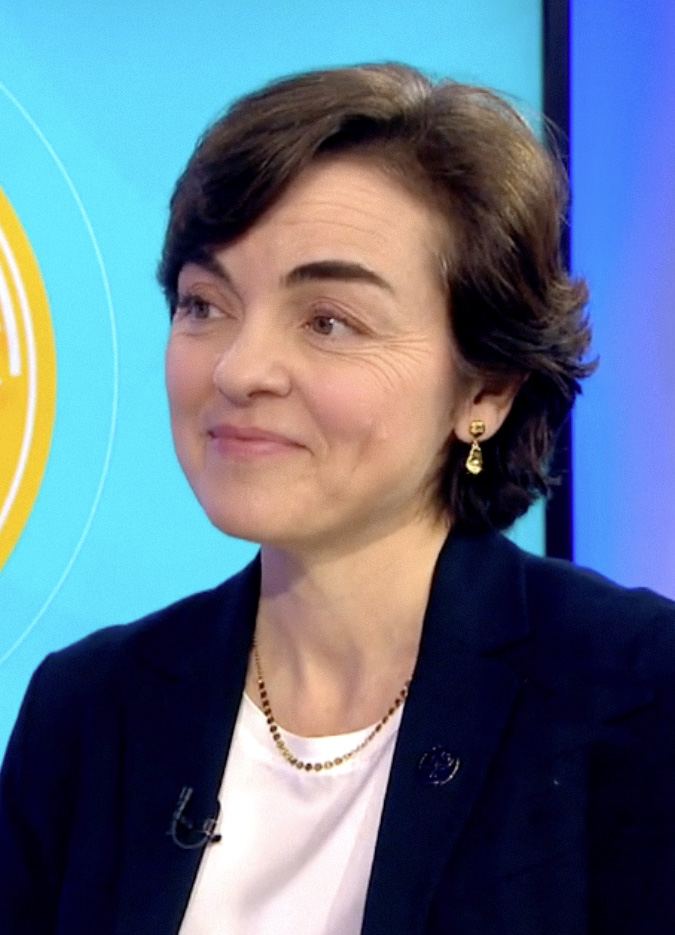
- Date formed: April 21, 2026
- Date dissolved: October 21, 2026

People and organisations
- Monarch: Charles III
- Lieutenant governor: Manon Jeannotte
- Premier: Christine Fréchette
- Premier's history: Premiership of Christine Fréchette
- Deputy Premier: Ian Lafrenière
- No. of ministers: 29
- Member party: Coalition Avenir Québec
- Status in legislature: Majority
- Opposition party: Liberal
- Opposition leader: André Fortin

History
- Incoming formation: 2026 CAQ leadership election
- Outgoing election: 2026
- Legislature term: 43rd Quebec Legislature
- Predecessor: Legault ministry
- Successor: St-Pierre Plamondon ministry

The Fréchette ministry was the provincial government of Quebec from April to October 2026. The Cabinet (formally the Executive Council of Quebec) was formed by Christine Fréchette after her victory in the 2026 Coalition Avenir Québec leadership election.

== Background ==
The Coalition Avenir Québec (CAQ) was co-founded by François Legault in 2011, with Legault leading the party to victory in the 2018 general election. On October 18, 2018, Legault was sworn in as Premier of Quebec, marking the end of nearly 50 years of Liberal and Parti Québécois rule in the province. Legault led the CAQ again in the 2022 general election to a second straight majority, with Fréchette being elected as an MNA in the election.

During the Legault government's second term, Cabinet ministers Lionel Carmant, Maïté Blanchette Vézina, Christian Dubé, Pierre Fitzgibbon, and Andrée Laforest all resigned due to various reasons. Despite saying he would lead the CAQ into the 2026 general election in December 2025, on January 14, 2026, Legault announced his pending resignation as premier and leader of the CAQ. Legault remained as leader and premier until a new leader was elected. Fréchette and Bernard Drainville entered the contest to replace him, with Fréchette being elected on April 12 and sworn in as premier on April 15.

The Cabinet consists of 17 men and 12 women; this is the second ministry formed by the CAQ, and the second Quebec government led by a woman.

All Cabinet ministers seeking re-election in the 2026 Quebec general election were defeated, including premier Fréchette, wiping out the entire CAQ from the National Assembly. Mathieu Lacombe was removed from the ministry on October 9.

== List of ministers ==
The ministry was sworn in on April 21, 2026.

Portfolio	Minister
Premier	Christine Fréchette
Deputy Premier; Minister of Internal Security; Minister responsible for Relations with First Nations and Inuit	Ian Lafrenière
Minister of Finance; Minister responsible for Infrastructure	Eric Girard
Minister of Education; Deputy Government House Leader	Sonia LeBel
Minister of Economy, Innovation and Energy; Minister responsible for the Maritime Strategy	Bernard Drainville
Minister of Health; Minister responsible for Seniors and Caregivers	Sonia Bélanger
Minister of Justice; Minister responsible for Constitutional Affairs	Simon Jolin-Barrette
Minister responsible for Government Administration; President of the Treasury Board; Minister of Cybersecurity and Digital Affairs	France-Élaine Duranceau
Minister of Culture and Communications	Mathieu Lacombe (until October 9, 2026)
Minister of the French Language; Minister responsible for the Canadian Francophonie; Minister responsible for Democratic Institutions; Minister responsible for Access to Information and the Protection of Personal Information; Minister responsible for Secularism	Jean-François Roberge
Minister of Labour; Minister responsible for Canadian Relations	Jean Boulet
Government House Leader; Minister of Immigration, Francisation and Integration	François Bonnardel
Minister of Natural Resources and Forests	Kateri Champagne Jourdain
Minister of the Environment, the Fight Against Climate Change, Wildlife and Parks	Pascale Déry
Minister of Higher Education; Minister responsible for the Status of Women; Minister of Culture and Communications (since October 9, 2026)	Martine Biron
Minister of Municipal Affairs	Samuel Poulin
Minister of Families	Catherine Blouin
Minister of Agriculture, Fisheries, and Food	Donald Martel
Minister of International Relations and La Francophonie; Minister responsible for Relations with English-speaking Quebecers and the Fight Against Racism	Christopher Skeete
Minister of Transport and Sustainable Mobility	Benoit Charette
Minister of Tourism	Amélie Dionne
Minister of Employment; Minister responsible for the National Capital Region	Jean-François Simard
Minister responsible for Social Solidarity and Community Action; Minister responsible for the Metropolis and the Montreal region	Chantal Rouleau
Minister responsible for Social Services and the Fight against Homelessness	Lionel Carmant
Minister responsible for Housing	Karine Boivin Roy
Minister responsible for Sport, Recreation and Outdoor Activities	Kariane Bourassa
Minister responsible for Youth; Minister Delegate for the Regions	Mathieu Lévesque
Minister Delegate for Regional Economic Development	Éric Girard
Minister Delegate for the Economy and Small and Medium-Sized Enterprises	Daniel Bernard
Parliamentary leaders
Caucus chair	Yves Montigny
Chief Government Whip	François Jacques

== See also ==
- Marois ministry
- Legault ministry
