= Legault ministry =

Cabinet of Quebec from 2018-2026

- 32nd ministry of Quebec
- 2018–2026
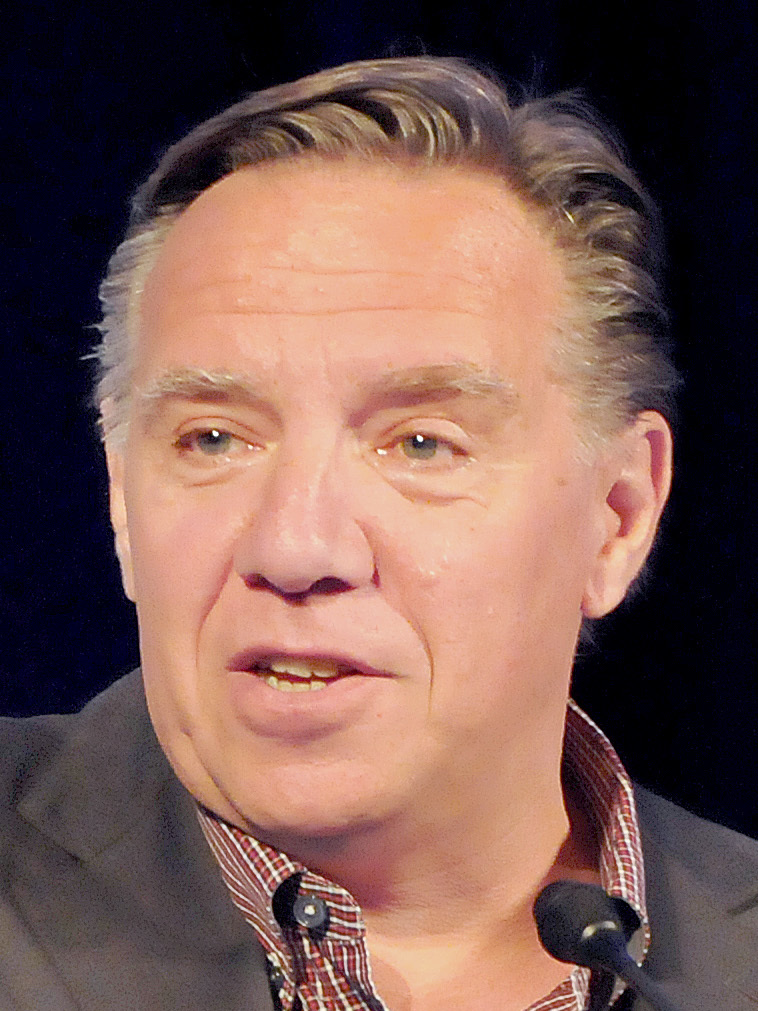
- Date formed: October 18, 2018
- Date dissolved: April 15, 2026

People and organisations
- Monarch: Elizabeth II (until 2022); Charles III (since 2022)
- Lieutenant governor: J. Michel Doyon (until 2024); Manon Jeannotte (since 2024)
- Premier: François Legault
- Deputy Premier: Geneviève Guilbault (until 2025)
- Member party: Coalition Avenir Québec
- Status in legislature: Majority
- Opposition party: Liberal
- Opposition leader: Pierre Arcand (2018–2020); Dominique Anglade (2020–2022); Marc Tanguay (2022–2025, 2025–2026); Marwah Rizqy (2025); André Fortin (2025, 2026)

History
- Elections: 2018; 2022
- Legislature terms: 42nd Quebec Legislature; 43rd Quebec Legislature
- Predecessor: Couillard ministry
- Successor: Fréchette ministry

The Legault ministry was the provincial government of Quebec from 2018 to 2026. Following the victory of François Legault, as the leader of the Coalition Avenir Québec (CAQ), he formed a new cabinet (formally the Executive Council of Quebec); this is the first time the CAQ has formed a government in Quebec's history. His government won another mandate following the 2022 Quebec general election.

== Background ==
In the 2018 general election on October 1, Legault led the CAQ to an unexpected gain of 53 seats for a total of 74, vaulting the CAQ from third place to a majority of 11, defeating Philippe Couillard's Quebec Liberal Party government. On October 18, 2018, Legault was sworn in as Premier of Quebec, marking the end of nearly 50 years of Liberal and Parti Québécois rule in the province.

Legault led the CAQ again in the 2022 general election to a second straight majority. Legault gained 14 seats in the election, expanding his caucus. During the Legault government's second term, Cabinet ministers Lionel Carmant, Maïté Blanchette Vézina, Christian Dubé, Pierre Fitzgibbon, and Andrée Laforest all resigned due to various reasons.

Despite saying he would lead the CAQ into the 2026 election in December 2025, on January 14, 2026, Legault announced his pending resignation as Premier and leader of the CAQ. Legault remained as leader and premier until a new leader was elected. Ministry member Christine Fréchette succeeded Legault on April 15.

== First ministry (2018–2022) ==
During the Legault government's first term, three reshuffles took place in 2019 and 2020, five took place in 2021, and two took place in 2022.

Portfolio	Minister
Premier; Minister responsible for Youth Issues; Minister responsible for relations with English-speaking Quebecers	François Legault
Deputy Premier; Minister of Public Security	Geneviève Guilbault
Minister of Health and Social Services	Danielle McCann
Minister of Finance	Eric Girard
Minister of Economy and Innovation	Pierre Fitzgibbon
President of the Treasury Board; Minister responsible for Government Administration	Christian Dubé
Vice-President of the Treasury Board; Minister responsible for government digital transformation	Éric Caire
Minister of Education and Higher Education	Jean-François Roberge
Minister of Culture and Communications; Minister responsible for the French Language	Nathalie Roy
Minister of Justice; Minister responsible for Canadian Relations and the Canadian Francophonie; Minister responsible for the Status of Women	Sonia LeBel
Minister of Immigration, Diversity and Inclusion	Simon Jolin-Barrette
Minister of the Environment and the Fight Against Climate Change	MarieChantal Chassé
Minister of Transport	François Bonnardel
Minister of the Family	Mathieu Lacombe
Minister of Municipal Affairs and Housing	Andrée Laforest
Minister of Agriculture, Fisheries and Food	André Lamontagne
Minister of Forests, Wildlife and Parks	Pierre Dufour
Minister of International Relations and Francophonie	Nadine Girault
Minister of Energy and Natural Resources	Jonatan Julien
Minister of Labour, Employment and Social Solidarity	Jean Boulet
Minister of Tourism	Caroline Proulx
Minister responsible for Seniors and Informal Caregivers	Marguerite Blais
Minister responsible for Indigenous Affairs	Sylvie D'Amours
Ministers responsible for the regions
Abitibi-Témiscamingue	Pierre Dufour
Bas-Saint-Laurent	Marie-Eve Proulx
Capitale-Nationale	Geneviève Guilbault
Centre-du-Québec	André Lamontagne
Chaudière-Appalaches	Marie-Eve Proulx
Côte-Nord	Jonatan Julien
Estrie	François Bonnardel
Gaspésie–Îles-de-la-Madeleine	Marie-Eve Proulx
Lanaudière	Pierre Fitzgibbon
Laurentides	Sylvie D'Amours
Laval	Eric Girard
Mauricie	Jean Boulet
Montérégie	Christian Dubé
Montréal	Chantal Rouleau
Nord-du-Québec	Pierre Dufour
Outaouais	Mathieu Lacombe
Saguenay–Lac-Saint-Jean	Andrée Laforest
Parliamentary leaders
Government House Leader	Simon Jolin-Barrette
Chief Government Whip	Eric Lefebvre

== Second ministry (2022–2026) ==
During the Legault government's second term, one reshuffle took place in 2023, three took place in 2024, five took place in 2025 (with a large reshuffle on September 10), and one took place in 2026.

Portfolio	Minister
Premier	François Legault
Deputy Premier; Minister of Transport and Sustainable Mobility	Geneviève Guilbault
Minister of Public Security; Minister responsible for the Estrie region	François Bonnardel
Minister of Health	Christian Dubé
Minister of Finance; Minister responsible for Relations with English-speaking Quebecers	Eric Girard
Minister of Economy, Innovation and Energy; Minister responsible for Regional Economic Development; Minister responsible for the Metropolis and the Montreal region	Pierre Fitzgibbon
President of the Treasury Board; Minister responsible for Government Administration	Sonia LeBel
Minister of Education; Minister responsible for Government Administration	Bernard Drainville
Minister of Higher Education	Pascale Déry
Minister of Culture and Communications; Minister responsible for Youth; Minister responsible for the Abitibi-Témiscamingue and Outaouais regions	Mathieu Lacombe
Minister of Justice; Government House Leader	Simon Jolin-Barrette
Minister of the French Language; Minister responsible for Canadian Relations and the Canadian Francophonie; Minister responsible for Democratic Institutions; Minister responsible for Access to Information and the Protection of Personal Information; Minister responsible for Secularism	Jean-François Roberge
Minister of Immigration, Francisation and Integration	Christine Fréchette
Minister of the Environment and the Fight Against Climate Change; Minister responsible for the Laurentians region	Benoit Charette
Minister of Families; Minister responsible for the Montérégie region	Suzanne Roy
Minister of Municipal Affairs; Minister responsible for the Saguenay–Lac-Saint-Jean region	Andrée Laforest
Minister of Agriculture, Fisheries and Food; Minister responsible for the Centre-du-Québec region	André Lamontagne
Minister of International Relations and La Francophonie; Minister responsible for the Status of Women	Martine Biron
Minister of Natural Resources and Forests; Minister responsible for the Bas-Saint-Laurent and Gaspésie–Îles-de-la-Madeleine regions	Maïté Blanchette Vézina
Minister of Labour; Minister responsible for the Mauricie and Nord-du-Québec regions	Jean Boulet
Minister of Employment; Minister responsible for the Côte-Nord region	Kateri Champagne Jourdain
Minister of Tourism; Minister responsible for the Lanaudière region	Caroline Proulx
Minister of Cybersecurity and Digital Affairs; Deputy Government Parliamentary Leader	Éric Caire
Ministers responsible
Minister responsible for Social Services	Lionel Carmant
Minister responsible for Housing	France-Élaine Duranceau
Minister responsible for Relations with First Nations and Inuit	Ian Lafrenière
Minister responsible for Sport, Leisure and Outdoor Activities	Isabelle Charest
Minister responsible for Infrastructure; Minister responsible for the National Capital Region	Jonatan Julien
Minister responsible for Social Solidarity and Community Action	Chantal Rouleau
Parliamentary leaders
Chief Government Whip	Eric Lefebvre

== Policy ==
=== Secularism ===
Having run on the platform during the 2018 election, on March 28, 2019, the Quebec government tabled its long-awaited secularism bill. Bill 21, entitled "An Act respecting the laicity of the State", if made law, would ban public workers in positions of authority from wearing religious symbols. This would include any public employee who carries a weapon, including police officers, courthouse constables, bodyguards, prison guards and wildlife officers, as well as Crown prosecutors, government lawyers and judges, school principals, vice-principals and teachers. The bill invoked notwithstanding clause of the Canadian Charter of Rights and Freedoms to prevent it from being overturned by the courts.

The bill passed on June 17 by a 73–35 vote, with backing of the Parti Québécois while the Liberals and Quebec Solidaire were opposed. The Coalition Avenir Quebec government also introduced a last-minute amendment toughening the law, making provisions for a minister to verify that it is being obeyed and to demand corrective measures if necessary.

Legault said the bill was moderate and that by having a law like this, it would prevent a party like France's Marine Le Pen National Rally in Quebec.

Legault initially supported keeping the crucifix that has been in the Legislative Assembly chamber since 1936, arguing the legislature's crucifix was a symbol of "heritage and history" rather than a religious icon and polls showing that over 55% of Quebecers supported the crucifix remaining. The crucifix was eventually removed.

On May 2, 2024, The bill was renewed by using the notwithstanding clause for five more years until 2029.

In 2026, the government passed legislation that banned street prayers and prayer rooms in universities and CEGEPs.

=== Language ===
In May 2022, The CAQ government of Legault passed Bill 96, with 78 MNAs in favour (from the CAQ and Québec solidaire) and 29 against (from the Liberal Party and Parti Québécois). The bill strengthens the 1970s Charter of the French Language bill.

=== Education ===
The Legault government passed Bill 40 on February 8, 2020. This expropriated the province's 60 French school boards, turning them into school service centres.

Bill 40 was passed to expropriate school boards that have been running in English style for 175 years. This did not include nine English school boards. But the move is seen as further undermining English-language education in the province.

In 2020, it was reported that the Coalition Avenir Québec (CAQ) government was going to replace the project (Ethics and religious culture (ERC) with a new curriculum which would shift the focus from religion toward culture and citizenship. It would be replaced by 2024 with a new course, Culture et citoyenneté québécoise.

In April 2022, following a controversy over academic freedom at the University of Ottawa, the Legault government tabled Bill 32, a bill on Academic freedom in universities. The bill passed in June 2022.

In April 2023, Bernard Drainville Quebec Minister of Education announced plans to ban prayer in all provincial public schools.

=== Monarchy ===
In December 2022, the government passed into law a bill that makes the Oath of Allegiance to the King optional for MNAs. This came after PQ MNAs refused the oath and were stopped from entering the legislature.

On January 2026. the government announced its removing the British crown from province’s coat of arms.

=== Other events ===
In April 2023, the government cancelled plans for a third link for vehicles between Quebec City and Lévis. After a by-election defeat and a dip in popularity, Legault's government announced a bridge and a tunnel for the project. That same year, the government passed Bill 24, which raised the salaries of MNAs and Cabinet ministers.

In the fall of 2023, Swedish battery manufacturer Northvolt announced a new battery gigafactory to be built near Montreal. Initially the factory intended to start production in 2026, but the timeline was delayed by 12 to 18 months according to CAQ minister Pierre Fitzgibbon. In March 2025, Northvolt declared bankruptcy; the CAQ government had invested millions in the proposed $7 billion factory.

In 2024, the government announced that it would fund a new roof for the Montreal Olympic Stadium.

In April 2025, an inquiry began into the Société de l'assurance automobile du Québec (SAAQ)'s digitalization attempts, which ran $500 million over budget. On September 10, 2025, Legault conducted a major Cabinet reshuffle.

In 2024, the government invested millions in bringing two National Hockey League exhibition games to Québec City.

In December 2024, Legault and Newfoundland and Labrador premier Andrew Furey signed a 50-year agreement renegotiating the 1969 Churchill Falls Generating Station agreement. If ratified by both provinces, Quebec would pay Newfoundland and Labrador Hydro $3.5 billion for co-development rights for two anticipated Churchill River energy projects. However, the memorandum of understanding was scrapped and later changed in August 2026 following a change in Newfoundland and Labrador's governing party in 2025.

His government's Bill 2, which linked physicians' compensation to performance targets and prohibited physicians from using labour pressure tactics that could interfere with access to care, caused protests and legal challenges in 2025. Legault himself negotiated with the doctors' union, reaching an agreement that rolled back many of the bill's measures.

=== Unapproved reforms ===
==== Quebec Constitution ====
In 2024, Legault said he was open to the idea of an Constitution of Quebec by 2026.

On October 9, 2025, the CAQ government tabled a draft constitution to the National Assembly of Quebec.

On June 11, 2026, the CAQ government under Christine Fréchette abandoned the constitution bill due to opposition from the Liberal Party and Québec Solidaire.

==== Electoral reforms ====
Legault was elected on a promise to reform the electoral system within a year of his victory. On September 25, 2019, Minister of Justice Sonia LeBel presented Bill 39, An Act to establish a new electoral system which aims to replace the first-past-the-post electoral system in favour of a mixed-member proportional representation system. According to the bill, the National Assembly would have kept 125 members. Of the 125 members, 80 would have been elected by receiving a plurality of votes in single-member districts, similar to the existing system, matching the 78 federal ridings with the addition of 2 unique districts: Îles-de-la-Madeleine and Ungava. The remaining 45 members would have been chosen according to their order in a regional party list. All 17 regions of Québec would have been guaranteed at least one MNA.

The proposed system was as such:

Federal region	Provincial region	District seats	Regional seats	% of electors	% of MNAs
Eastern Quebec	Gaspésie–Îles-de-la-Madeleine	2	1	1.2%	2.4%
Eastern Quebec	Bas-Saint-Laurent	2	1	2.6%	2.4%
Quebec City	Capitale-Nationale	7	4	9.2%	8.8%
Quebec City	Chaudière-Appalaches	4	3	5.4%	5.4%
Eastern Townships	Centre-du-Québec	3	2	3.1%	4.0%
Eastern Townships	Estrie	3	2	4.0%	4.0%
Montérégie	Montérégie	14	8	18.9%	17.6%
Hochelaga (East Montreal, West; Montreal, North Montreal & Laval)	Montreal	16	8	21.5%	19.2%
Hochelaga (East Montreal, West; Montreal, North Montreal & Laval)	Laval	4	2	5.0%	4.8%
Côte-Nord and Saguenay	Saguenay–Lac-Saint-Jean	3	2	3.6%	4.0%
Côte-Nord and Saguenay	Côte-Nord	1	1	1.1%	1.6%
Central Quebec	Mauricie	3	2	3.5 %	4.0%
Central Quebec	Lanaudière	5	3	6.3 %	6.4%
The Laurentides, Outaouais and Northern Quebec	Laurentides	6	3	7.6 %	7.2%
The Laurentides, Outaouais and Northern Quebec	Outaouais	4	2	4.6 %	4.8%
The Laurentides, Outaouais and Northern Quebec	Abitibi-Témiscamingue	2	1	1.9%	2.4%
The Laurentides, Outaouais and Northern Quebec	Nord-du-Québec	1	0	0.5%	0.8%
TOTAL		80	45		

Bill 39 was intended to be debated in the legislature before June 2021. The bill's implementation would have been contingent on popular support expressed in a referendum held on the same day as the general election. Had this referendum been successful, then the first legislature to be elected under mixed-member proportional would have been the 44th, in October 2026 at the latest. On April 28, 2021, Justice Minister LeBel informed a legislative committee hearing that the government would not move forward with a referendum on electoral reform in 2022. LeBel blamed the COVID-19 pandemic for altering the government's timeline and could not or would not commit to providing an alternate date for the referendum, effectively ending discussions about electoral reform in Quebec.

In December 2025, his government passed legislation that banned vote buying in municipal and provincial leadership elections.

== See also ==
- Marois ministry
