= St-Pierre Plamondon ministry =

Provincial government of Quebec

- 2026-present
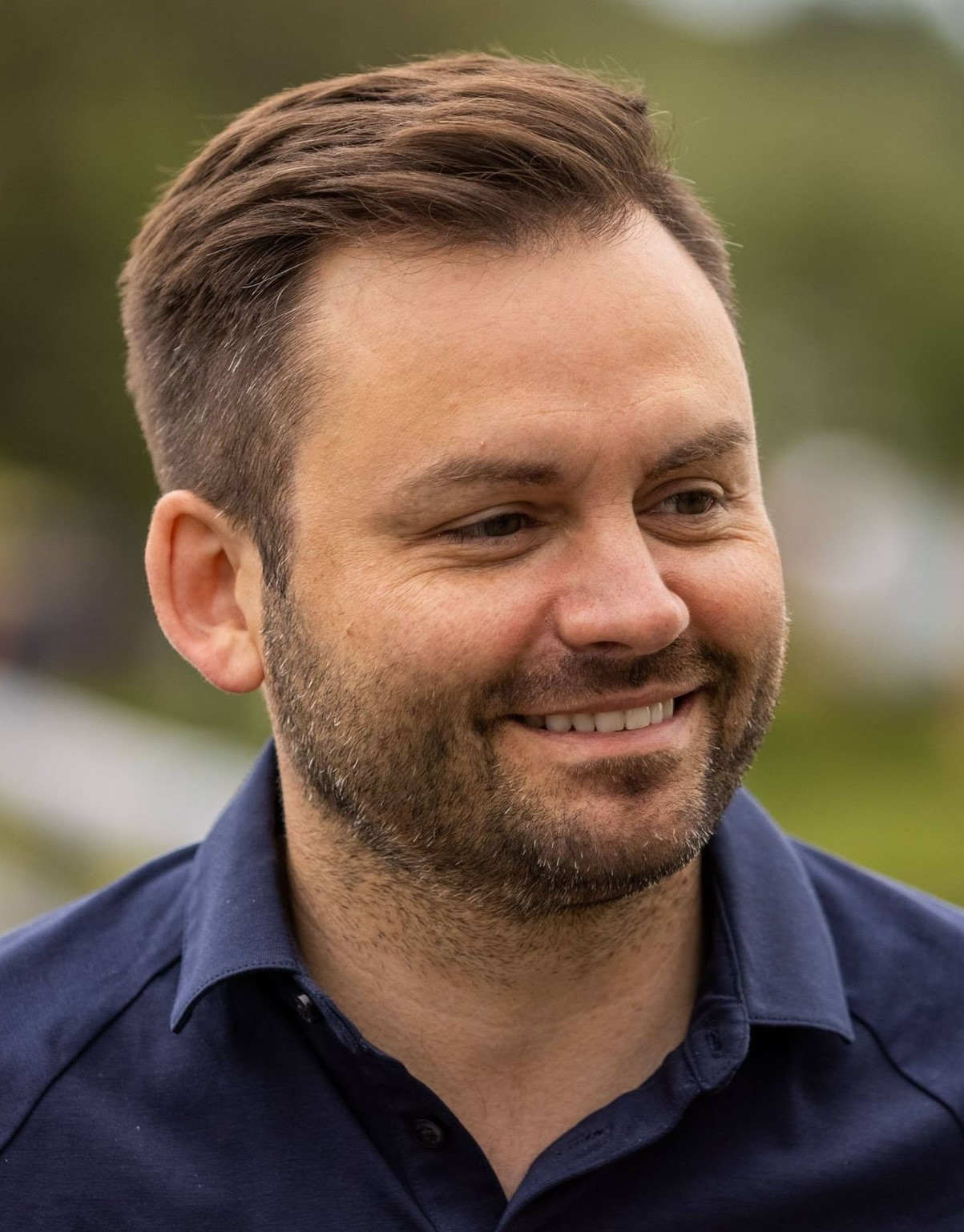
- Date formed: October 21, 2026

People and organisations
- Monarch: Charles III
- Lieutenant governor: Manon Jeannotte
- Premier: Paul St-Pierre Plamondon
- Deputy Premier: Catherine Gentilcore
- Member party: Parti Québécois
- Status in legislature: Minority
- Opposition party: Liberal
- Opposition leader: Charles Milliard

History
- Election: 2026
- Legislature term: 44th Legislature
- Predecessor: Fréchette ministry

The St-Pierre Plamondon ministry is the incumbent provincial government of Quebec. Its cabinet was revealed on October 21, 2026, following the 2026 Quebec general election which resulted in the Parti Québécois achieving a minority government under leader Paul St-Pierre Plamondon. The 23-minister cabinet is smaller than its predecessor's and includes a new independence minister charged with preparing the province on a future independence referendum.

== List of ministers ==
The St-Pierre Plamondon cabinet and their responsibilities were revealed on October 21, 2026. As the Parti Québécois was not successful in electing a member in the Quebec City region during the 2026 election, a minister responsible for that region was not initially announced; Plamondon later posted on social media that his ministry would (at a later date) appoint to the role either a non-Quebec City MNA from the Parti Québécois or a Quebec City MNA from the Conservative Party or Québec solidaire.

Portfolio	Minister
Premier; Minister Responsible for the Fight Against Homelessness	Paul St-Pierre Plamondon
Deputy Premier; Government House Leader; Minister of Immigration and Integration; Minister Responsible for Attaining Quebec Independence	Catherine Gentilcore
Minister of Finance and Revenue; Minister Responsible for Infrastructure	Nicolas Marceau
President of the Treasury Board; Minister Responsible for Government Administration; Minister Responsible for Community Action; Deputy Government House Leader	Alain Therrien
Delegate Minister for Government Efficiency and the Regulatory Streamlining of the State; Minister Responsible for the Abitibi-Témiscamingue and Nord-du-Québec Regions	Sébastien D'Astous
Delegate Minister for Artificial Intelligence and Digital Affairs; Minister Responsible for the Laurentides Region	Anne Nguyen
Minister of Transport and Sustainable Mobility; Minister of Municipal Affairs; Minister Responsible for the Capitale-Nationale Region	Nicolas Girard
Minister of Economic Development, Innovation and Energy; Minister Responsible for the Metropolis and the Montreal Region	Stéphane Paquet
Minister of International Relations, La Francophonie, and Foreign Trade; Minister Responsible for the Laval Region	Dieudonné Ella Oyono
Minister of National Education	Joël Arseneau
Minister of Higher Education; Minister Responsible for Housing; Minister Responsible for the Status of Women; Minister Responsible for the Lanaudière Region	Elsie Lefebvre
Minister of Labour, Employment and Social Solidarity	Mathieu Lebrun
Minister of Families and Youth; Minister Responsible for Sports and Leisure; Minister Responsible for the Gaspésie–Îles-de-la-Madeleine Region	Méganne Perry Mélançon
Minister of Health, Prevention and Seniors; Minister Responsible for the Saguenay–Lac-Saint-Jean Region	Marie-Karlynn Laflamme
Minister Responsible for Democratic Institutions; Delegate Minister for Mental Health and Social Services; Minister Responsible for the Outaouais Region	Camille Pellerin-Forget
Minister of Justice and Attorney General; Minister Responsible for Relations with English-speaking Quebecers; Minister Responsible for the Fight Against Racism; Minister Responsible for the Fight Against Discrimination Against LGBTQ+ People; Minister Responsible for Access to Information and the Protection of Personal Information; Minister Responsible for Canada's Intergovernmental Affairs; Minister Responsible for Secularism	Marie-Claude Sarrazin
Minister of Culture, Heritage, Communications and the French Language; Minister Responsible for the Bas-Saint-Laurent Region	Pascal Bérubé
Minister Responsible for Relations with First Nations and Inuit	Simon-Pierre Savard-Tremblay
Minister of the Environment, the Fight Against Climate Change, Wildlife and Parks; Minister Responsible for the Mauricie Region	Jean Pellerin
Minister of Interior Security; Minister Responsible for the Montérégie Region	Guy Lapointe Jr.
Minister of Natural Resources and Forests; Minister Responsible for the Centre-du-Québec and Chaudière-Appalaches Regions	Natalie Bisaillon
Minister Responsible for Regions and Territory Occupation; Minister Responsible for the Côte-Nord Region	Meggie Richard
Minister of Agriculture, Fisheries and Food; Minister Responsible for the Estrie Region	Bernard Sévigny
Parliamentary leaders
Chief Government Whip	William Fradette
Government Caucus Chair	Nadine Le Gal
