= 2026 Coalition Avenir Québec leadership election =

Political party leadership election in Canada

- April 12, 2026
- Turnout: 77.1%
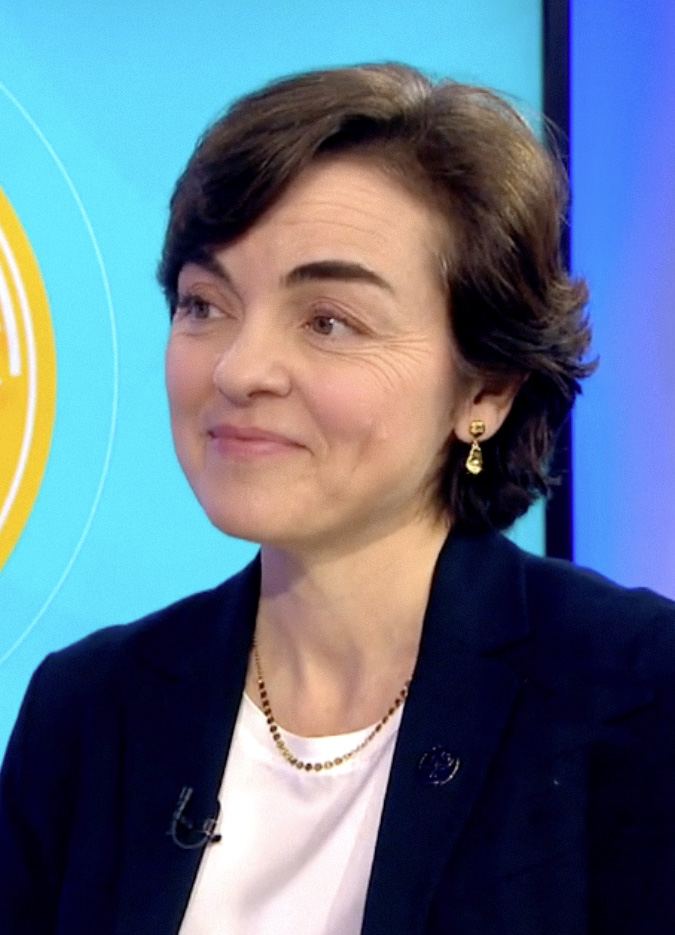

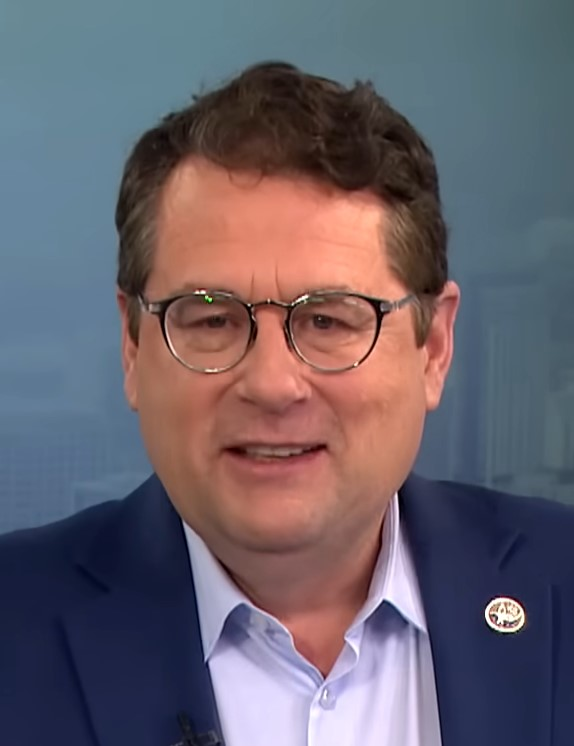
Candidate	Christine Fréchette	Bernard Drainville
Results	57.9%	42.1%
Leader before election
François Legault
Elected leader
Christine Fréchette

2026 Coalition Avenir Québec leadership election
- Date: April 12, 2026
- Convention: Centrexpo Promutuel Assurance, Drummondville
- Resigning leader: François Legault
- Won by: Christine Fréchette
- Ballots: 1
- Candidates: 2
- Entrance fee: $30,000
- Spending limit: $150,000

From April 7 to 12, 2026, members of the Coalition Avenir Québec (CAQ) voted in a leadership election to choose a successor for François Legault, who announced his resignation in January amid unfavourable opinion polling.

Christine Fréchette, a former member of the Legault ministry, won the election with over 57% of the vote, defeating Bernard Drainville, becoming the party's second leader and Quebec's second female premier.

Christine Fréchette would lead the party to a historic defeat, losing all 79 of their seats in an electoral wipeout in the 2026 Quebec general election.

== Background ==
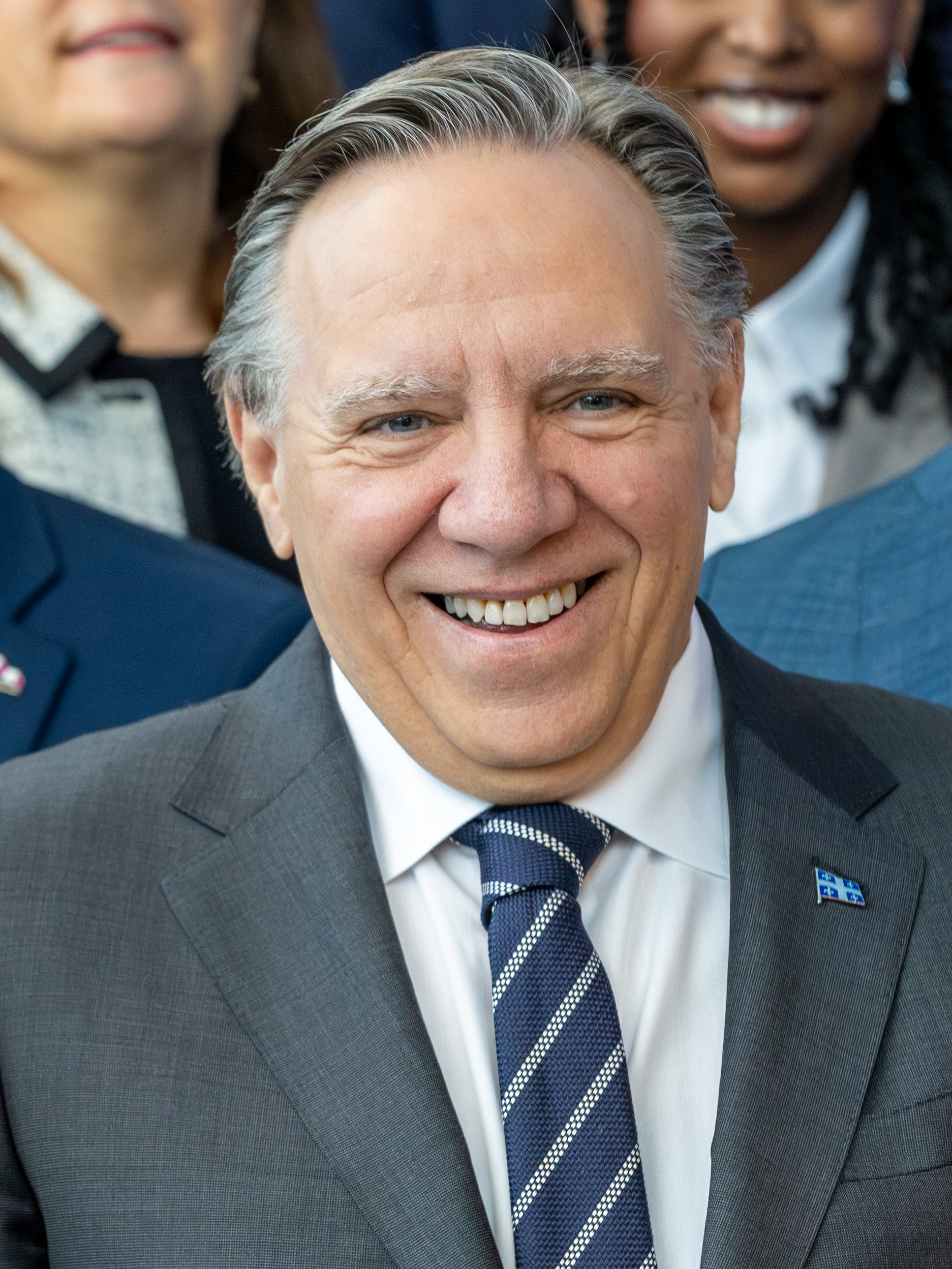
François Legault

Legault, the party's first leader who co-founded the party in 2011, led his party to two consecutive majority government victories in 2018 and 2022. From the 2018 general election until 2023, the Legault government enjoyed one of the highest approval ratings in Canada. However, from late 2023, the situation reversed; the Legault government become one of the most unpopular provincial governments in Canada, suffering from poor opinion polling throughout the 43rd Quebec Legislature. The party also lost the Jean-Talon, Terrebonne, Arthabaska, and Chicoutimi by-elections to the Parti Québécois, while losing 8 other MNAs due to either expulsions or resignations from caucus. In particular, Cabinet ministers Lionel Carmant, Maïté Blanchette Vézina, Christian Dubé, Pierre Fitzgibbon, and Andrée Laforest all resigned due to various reasons since the 2022 election.

Despite saying he would lead the CAQ into the next election in December 2025, on January 14, 2026, Legault announced his pending resignation as Premier and leader of the CAQ. His party was sitting in either third or fourth place behind the PQ, Liberals, and the Conservative Party of Quebec, with the last poll before Legault's resignation showing them tied with Québec solidaire for the last place. Legault will remain as leader and Premier until a new leader is elected.

The election was held just months before the 2026 general election. It was also the party's first leadership election since its founding in 2011.

=== Campaign ===
Fréchette's campaign mostly focused on economic issues, while Drainville focused on identity and immigration issues. She stated her support for the cancelled Programme de l'expérience québécoise; Drainville opposed this. During the campaign period, she raised nearly $120,000 while he raised nearly $55,000.

== Rules ==
To qualify, candidates collected: a minimum of 1,000 signatures from party members across at least 75 provincial electoral districts, the support of at least 15 members of the National Assembly (MNAs), and at least 100 members of the party's youth commission. To enter, candidates also paid a non-refundable deposit of $30,000 and were told to adhere to a spending limit of $150,000. The vote was held online and via telephone, with the voting period being between April 7 and April 12. The party also used a ranked-choice voting system to elect a leader.

In February 2026, Bernard Drainville called for the party to change its voting rules to limit leadership vote to Canadian citizens. Under the announced leadership rules, people 16 years and up who have been residents of Quebec for six months were eligible to vote. People not members of the party had until March 13 to purchase a membership card to vote.

== Timeline ==
- January 14, 2026 – Legault announces his resignation as party leader, stating that he would remain in the position until a successor is elected.
- January 22, 2026 – The campaign period begins with the party announcing the rules of the race.
- January 24, 2026 – MNA for Lévis Bernard Drainville announces his candidacy.
- January 25, 2026 – MNA for Sanguinet Christine Fréchette announces her candidacy.
- February 21, 2026 — Deadline for candidates to register.
- March 13, 2026 — Membership eligibility deadline.
- March 21, 2026 – First leadership debate is held in Quebec City.
- March 28, 2026 – Second leadership debate is held in Laval.
- April 7, 2026 – Voting period begins.
- April 12, 2026 – Voting period concludes, with the winner being announced at the party's leadership convention in Drummondville.

== Candidates ==
=== Declared ===
Candidate	Experience	Announcement Date	Campaign	Ref.
Bernard Drainville	Minister of the Environment, the Fight Against Climate Change, Wildlife and Parks (2025–2026); Minister of Education (2022–2025); Minister of Democratic Institutions and Citizen Participation (2012–2014); CAQ MNA for Lévis (2022–2026); PQ MNA for Marie-Victorin (2007–2016); Withdrawn candidate in the 2015 Parti Québécois leadership election	January 24, 2026	Endorsements; Website	
Christine Fréchette	Minister of the Economy, Innovation and Energy (2024–2026); Minister of Immigration, Francization and Integration (2022–2024); MNA for Sanguinet (2022–2026)	January 25, 2026	Endorsements; Website	

=== Declined ===
- François Bonnardel, Minister of Public Security (2022–2025), MNA for Granby (2012–2026). (Endorsed Fréchette)
- Benoit Charette, MNA for Deux-Montagnes (2014–2026, 2008–2012). (Endorsed Fréchette)
- Guy Cormier, president and chief executive officer of Desjardins Group (2016–2025)
- Mario Dumont, leader of Action démocratique du Québec (1994–2009), Leader of the Opposition of Quebec (2007–2008), MNA for Rivière-du-Loup (1994–2009).
- Eric Girard, Minister of Finance (2018–2026), MNA for Groulx (2018–2026). (Endorsed Fréchette)
- Geneviève Guilbault, Deputy Premier of Quebec (2018–2025), Minister of Municipal Affairs (2025–2026), MNA for Louis-Hébert (2017–2026).
- Simon Jolin-Barrette, Minister of Justice (2020–2026), MNA for Borduas (2014–2026). (Endorsed Drainville)
- Mathieu Lacombe, Minister of Culture and Communications (2022–2026), MNA for Papineau (2018–2026). (Endorsed Fréchette)
- Ian Lafrenière, MNA for Vachon (2018–2026). (Endorsed Fréchette)
- Sonia LeBel, Minister of Education (2025–2026), MNA for Champlain (2018–2026).
- Samuel Poulin, MNA for Beauce-Sud (2018–2026). (Endorsed Drainville)
- Olivier Primeau, businessman.
- Jean-François Simard, MNA for Montmorency (2018–2026, 1998–2003). (Endorsed Fréchette)
- Christopher Skeete, MNA for Sainte-Rose (2018–2026). (Endorsed Fréchette)

== Endorsements ==
Endorsements of Bernard Drainville

Current caucus members:

- Alice Abou-Khalil, MNA for Fabre (2022–2026)
- Simon Allaire, MNA for Maskinongé (2018–2026)
- Mario Asselin, MNA for Vanier-Les Rivières (2018–2026)
- Sonia Bélanger, MNA for Prévost (2022–2026)
- Kariane Bourassa, MNA for Charlevoix–Côte-de-Beaupré (2022–2026)
- Éric Caire, MNA for La Peltrie (2007–2026)
- Shirley Dorismond, MNA for Marie-Victorin (2022–2026)
- Yannick Gagnon, MNA for Jonquière (2022–2026)
- Geneviève Hébert, MNA for Saint-François (2018–2026)
- Simon Jolin-Barrette, MNA for Borduas (2014–2026)
- Jonatan Julien, MNA for Charlesbourg (2018–2026)
- Isabelle Lecours, MNA for Lotbinière-Frontenac (2018–2026)
- Lucie Lecours, MNA for Les Plaines (2018–2026)
- Louis Lemieux, MNA for Saint-Jean (2018–2026)
- Sylvain Lévesque, MNA for Chauveau (2018–2026) and Vanier-Les Rivières (2012–2014)
- Marilyne Picard, MNA for Soulanges (2018-2026)
- Samuel Poulin, MNA for Beauce-Sud (2018–2026)
- Luc Provençal, MNA for Beauce-Nord (2018–2026)
- Stéphane Sainte-Croix, MNA for Gaspé (2022–2026)

Former caucus members:

- Janvier Grondin, MNA for Beauce-Nord (2003–2012)
- Lise Lavallée, MNA for Repentigny (2014–2022)
- Marc Picard, MNA for Chutes-de-la-Chaudière (2003–2022)
Endorsements of Christine Fréchette

Current caucus members:

- Gilles Bélanger, MNA for Orford (2018–2026)
- Daniel Bernard, MNA for Rouyn-Noranda–Témiscamingue (2022–2026, 2008–2012, 2003–2007)
- Catherine Blouin, MNA for Bonaventure (2022–2026)
- Audrey Bogemans, MNA for Iberville (2022–2026)
- Karine Boivin Roy, MNA for Anjou–Louis-Riel (2022–2026)
- François Bonnardel, MNA for Granby (2012–2026)
- Jean Boulet, MNA for Trois-Rivières (2018–2026)
- Robert Bussière, MNA for Gatineau (2018–2026)
- Lionel Carmant, MNA for Taillon (2018–2026)
- Vincent Caron, MNA for Portneuf (2018–2026)
- Kateri Champagne Jourdain, MNA for Duplessis (2022–2026)
- Benoit Charette, MNA for Deux-Montagnes (2014–2026, 2008–2012)
- Pascale Déry, MNA for Repentigny (2022–2026)
- Amélie Dionne, MNA for Rivière-du-Loup–Témiscouata (2022–2026)
- France-Élaine Duranceau MNA for Bertrand (2022–2026)
- Eric Girard, MNA for Groulx (2018–2026)
- Éric Girard, MNA for Lac-Saint-Jean (2018–2026)
- Céline Haytayan, MNA for Laval-des-Rapides (2022–2026)
- Chantale Jeannotte, MNA for Labelle (2018–2026)
- Stéphanie Lachance, MNA for Bellechasse (2018–2026)
- Mathieu Lacombe, MNA for Papineau (2018–2026)
- Mario Laframboise, MNA for Blainville (2014–2026)
- Ian Lafrenière, MNA for Vachon (2018–2026)
- Mathieu Lemay, MNA for Masson (2014–2026)
- Yves Montigny, MNA for René-Lévesque (2022–2026)
- Mathieu Rivest, MNA for Côte-du-Sud (2022–2026)
- Jean-François Roberge, MNA for Chambly (2014–2026)
- Suzanne Roy, MNA for Verchères (2022–2026)
- Chantal Rouleau, MNA for Pointe-aux-Trembles (2018–2026)
- Valérie Schmaltz, MNA for Vimont (2022–2026)
- Sébastien Schneeberger, MNA for Drummond–Bois-Francs (2012–2026) and Drummond (2007–2008)
- Jean-François Simard, MNA for Montmorency (2018–2026, 1998–2003)
- Christopher Skeete, MNA for Sainte-Rose (2018–2026)
- François St-Louis, MNA for Joliette (2022–2026)
- Marie-Louise Tardif, MNA for Laviolette–Saint-Maurice (2018–2026)
- Louis-Charles Thouin, MNA for Rousseau (2018–2026)

== Opinion polling ==
=== Leadership election ===
==== CAQ supporters ====
Polling firm	Last date of polling	Sample size	Source	MoE	Guy Cormier	Christian Dubé	Bernard Drainville	Christine Fréchette	Eric Girard	Geneviève Guilbault	Simon Jolin- Barrette	Sonia LeBel	Jean- François Roberge	Other
Léger	March 30, 2026	1061		3.01%	–	–	24%	61%	–	–	–	–	–	Don’t know/refused to answer 16%
Léger	January 29, 2026	134		–	–	–	22%	59%	–	–	–	–	–	Another candidate 5% Don’t know/refused to answer 14%
Léger	November 10, 2025	98		–	6%	–	1%	9%	–	15%	18%	6%	–	Other 5% Don’t know/refused to answer 40%
Léger	June 22, 2025	117		–	–	20%	6%	2%	–	23%	11%	11%	–	Other 1% Don’t know/refused to answer 25%
Pallas Data	November 26, 2024	204		–	–	16.2%	9.1%	–	2.6%	25.5%	9.8%	6.2%	1.0%	None of these candidates 7.9% Uncertain 21.7%

==== All Quebecers ====
Polling firm	Last date of polling	Sample size	Source	MoE	Guy Cormier	Christian Dubé	Bernard Drainville	Christine Fréchette	Eric Girard	Geneviève Guilbault	Simon Jolin- Barrette	Sonia LeBel	Jean- François Roberge	Other
Léger	March 30, 2026	1061		3.01%	–	–	14%	38%	–	–	–	–	–	Don't know/refused to answer 48%
Léger	January 29, 2026	1000		±3.1%	–	–	10%	34%	–	–	–	–	–	Another candidate 18% Don’t know/refused to answer 38%
Léger	November 10, 2025	1031		±3.1%	4%	–	4%	5%	–	10%	10%	8%	–	Other 9% Don’t know/refused to answer 51%
SOM	October 12, 2025	1058		±3.5%	–	10%	6%	5%	–	10%	14%	14%	–	Other 5% I don’t know 36%
Léger	June 22, 2025	1056		±3.0%	–	10%	5%	3%	–	12%	8%	9%	–	Other 10% Don’t know/refused to answer 44%
Pallas Data	November 26, 2024	1093		±3%	–	10.4%	6.1%	–	2.5%	15.4%	9.2%	9.2%	1.2%	None of these candidates 24.3% Uncertain 21.8%

=== General election ===
==== Bernard Drainville as leader ====
Polling organisation	Last date of polling	Source	Sample size	MoE	CAQ	QS	PQ	PLQ	PCQ	Other	Lead
Léger	April 6, 2026		1,036	3.04%	8	9	32	35	13	3	3
Léger	March 30, 2026		1,061	3.01%	10	10	34	31	11	3	3
Léger	January 29, 2026		1,000	3.10%	15	9	34	24	14	4	10

==== Christine Fréchette as leader ====
Polling organisation	Last date of polling	Source	Sample size	MoE	CAQ	QS	PQ	PLQ	PCQ	Other	Lead
Léger	April 6, 2026		1,036	3.04%	18	8	30	29	12	2	1
Léger	March 30, 2026		1,061	3.01%	16	10	32	28	12	2	4
Léger	January 29, 2026		1,000	3.10%	25	7	30	21	14	3	5

== Results ==
	First Ballot
Candidate	Vote share
Christine Fréchette	57.9%
Bernard Drainville	42.1%
Totals	100.0%

Turnout was 77.1% (15,824 total votes cast). There were 20,524 eligible voters.
