= Ministry of Municipal Affairs and Housing =

Ministry of Municipal Affairs and Housing may refer to:

- Ministry of Municipal Affairs and Housing (Ontario)
- Ministry of Municipal Affairs and Housing (Quebec)
