= Ministry of International Relations and La Francophonie (Quebec) =

- Ministère des Relations internationales et de la Francophonie

Agency overview
- Minister responsible: Christopher Skeete

The Ministry of International Relations and La Francophonie (French: Ministère des Relations internationales et de la Francophonie) is a department in the Government of Quebec. Its primary task is to "promote and defend Québec’s interests internationally."

It was established by the government of Daniel Johnson in 1967 as the Ministry of Intergovernmental Affairs, replacing and expanding on an earlier Ministry of Federal-Provincial Relations.

As of 2010, one of the ministry's responsibilities is overseeing Quebec's relationship with the Francophonie. This responsibility was formerly held by a different member of cabinet.

The department is overseen by the Minister of International Relations, who is also styled as the minister responsible for the Francophonie. The current minister is Christopher Skeete.

Sylvain Simard, who served as minister from 1996 to 1998, was also styled as the minister responsible for international humanitarian action from 1997 to 1998.

== List of ministers ==
=== Since 1984 ===
List of ministers of international relations of Quebec since 1984
Name Office Title	Party	In office		Cabinet
Bernard Landry; Minister of International Relations	Parti Québécois	March 5, 1984	October 6, 1985	Lévesque
Louise Beaudoin; Minister of International Relations	None	October 6, 1985	December 12, 1985	Johnson
Gil Rémillard; Minister of International Relations	Liberal	December 12, 1985	June 23, 1988	Bourassa
Paul Gobeil; Minister of International Affairs	Liberal	June 23, 1988	October 11, 1989	Bourassa
John Ciaccia; Minister of International Affairs	Liberal	October 11, 1989	January 11, 1994	Bourassa
John Ciaccia; Minister of International Affairs, Immigration, and Cultural Communities	Liberal	January 11, 1994	September 26, 1994	Johnson Jr.
Bernard Landry; Minister of International Affairs, Immigration, and Cultural Communities	Parti Québécois	September 26, 1994	January 29, 1996	Parizeau
Sylvain Simard; Minister of International Relations	Parti Québécois	January 29, 1996	December 15, 1998	Bouchard
Louise Beaudoin; Minister of International Relations	Parti Québécois	December 15, 1998	March 8, 2001	Bouchard
Louise Beaudoin; Minister of State for International Relations	Parti Québécois	March 8, 2001	April 29, 2003	Landry
Monique Gagnon-Tremblay; Minister of International Relations	Liberal	April 29, 2003	December 18, 2008	Charest
Pierre Arcand; Minister of International Relations	Liberal	December 18, 2008	August 11, 2010	Charest
Monique Gagnon-Tremblay; Minister of International Relations	Liberal	August 11, 2010	September 19, 2012	Charest
Jean-François Lisée; Minister of International Relations, La Francophonie and Trade	Parti Québécois	September 19, 2012	April 23, 2014	Marois
Christine St-Pierre; Minister of International Relations and La Francophonie	Liberal	April 23, 2014	October 18, 2018	Couillard
Nadine Girault; Minister of International Relations and La Francophonie	Coalition Avenir Québec	October 18, 2018	October 20, 2022	Legault
Martine Biron; Minister of International Relations and La Francophonie	Coalition Avenir Québec	October 20, 2022	September 11, 2025	Legault
Christopher Skeete; Minister of International Relations and La Francophonie	Coalition Avenir Québec	September 11, 2025	Incumbent	Legault; Fréchette

== Quebec Government Offices ==
The ministry operates the Quebec Government Offices, de facto embassies which serve as communication depots between the Government of Quebec and governments outside of Canada. None of the offices in 28 countries have official diplomatic accreditation, but they serve as venues for paradiplomacy.

== Offices attached to the ministry ==
- Franco-Quebec Youth Office
- Quebec/Wallonia-Brussels Office for Youth
- Quebec-Americas Office for Youth
- Quebec-World Office for Youth

== Partner organizations ==
- Franco-Quebec Council for University Cooperation
- Inter-American University Organization
- France-Quebec Federation / Francophonie
- International Association of Quebec Studies
- Conference of Heads of Government of Partner Regions

== See also ==
- Alberta International and Intergovernmental Relations
- Ontario Ministry of Intergovernmental Affairs
- Saskatchewan Ministry of Intergovernmental Affairs
