= Bernard Drainville =

Canadian politician

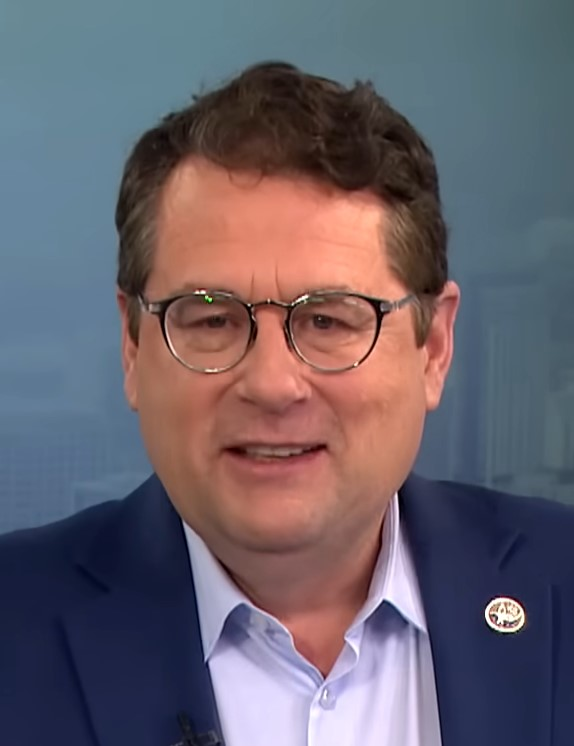
- Drainville in 2024

Minister of Economy, Innovation and Energy
- In office April 21, 2026 – October 21, 2026
- Premier: Christine Fréchette
- Preceded by: Jean Boulet
- Succeeded by: Stéphane Paquet

Minister of the Environment, the Fight Against Climate Change, Wildlife and Parks
- In office September 10, 2025 – January 26, 2026
- Premier: François Legault
- Preceded by: Benoit Charette
- Succeeded by: Benoit Charette

Minister of Education
- In office October 20, 2022 – September 10, 2025
- Premier: François Legault
- Preceded by: Jean-François Roberge
- Succeeded by: Sonia LeBel

Minister of Democratic Institutions and Citizen Participation
- In office September 19, 2012 – April 23, 2014
- Premier: Pauline Marois
- Preceded by: Pierre Moreau
- Succeeded by: Jean-Marc Fournier

Member of the National Assembly of Quebec
- In office October 3, 2022 – October 5, 2026
- Preceded by: François Paradis
- Succeeded by: Karine Laflamme
- Constituency: Lévis
- In office April 25, 2007 – June 13, 2016
- Preceded by: Cécile Vermette
- Succeeded by: Catherine Fournier
- Constituency: Marie-Victorin

Personal details
- Born: June 6, 1963 (age 63) La Visitation-de-l'Île-Dupas, Quebec, Canada
- Party: Coalition Avenir Québec
- Other political affiliations: Parti Québécois (2007–2022)
- Profession: Journalist, television host, radio host, politician

Bernard Drainville (French pronunciation: [bɛʁnaʁ dʁɛ̃vil]; born June 6, 1963) is a Canadian politician, broadcaster and journalist. A member of the Coalition Avenir Québec (CAQ), he served as a member of the National Assembly of Quebec (MNA) for the riding of Lévis from 2022 to 2026. He was formerly the MNA for the riding of Marie-Victorin in Longueuil from 2007 to 2016, representing the Parti Québécois (PQ).

Between 1989 and 2007, he pursued a journalistic career with Radio-Canada, where he served as an international and parliamentary correspondent and host of public affairs programs. He then entered politics with the PQ in the 2007 general election. As Minister of Democratic Institutions and Citizen Participation in the Marois government, he was a staunch defender of the controversial Quebec Charter of Values.

He resigned in 2016 to become a radio host, before announcing his return to politics in the 2022 general election under the CAQ. He was later appointed to the position of Minister of Education in the Legault government, which he held until 2025, when he was then appointed Minister of the Environment, the Fight Against Climate Change, Wildlife and Parks and Minister responsible for the Maritime Strategy. In the Fréchette government, he became Minister of Economy, Innovation and Energy. He has run for party leadership of both the PQ and CAQ.

== Early life and career ==
Drainville was born in La Visitation-de-l'Île-Dupas, Quebec. He attended the University of Ottawa, where he was president of the Student Federation of the University of Ottawa in 1984–85 and obtained a bachelor's degree in political science. He earned a master's degree in international relations at the London School of Economics.

In 1989, Drainville joined Radio-Canada as a journalist, where he worked at the Windsor affiliate. He became a correspondent for Latin America in 2001, where he was arrested once in Mexico and detained by the Revolutionary Armed Forces of Colombia. Prior to 2007, he was a television host at the network's news channel RDI and the correspondent at the National Assembly, and a correspondent for the House of Commons of Canada from 1998 to 2001. He hosted the City of Montreal mayoral debate between Gérald Tremblay and Pierre Bourque during the 2005 municipal election campaign.

== Political career ==
=== Parti Québécois ===
Drainville jumped into provincial politics and was elected in the 2007 elections in Marie-Victorin and was named the PQ's critic in health. He was re-elected in the 2008 and 2012 general elections.

On September 19, 2012, he became Minister responsible for Democratic Institutions and Active Citizenship under the Marois government. He was responsible for introducing the controversial Quebec Charter of Values, which would have banned state employees from wearing religious symbols.

He was re-elected in 2014, despite his party's defeat and was appointed the official opposition critic for energy and natural resources.

On October 20, 2014, he declared his candidacy for the Parti Québécois leadership election but dropped out on April 22, 2015, and endorsed Pierre-Karl Péladeau.

On September 7, 2015, he was appointed the Opposition House leader by Péladeau.

On June 13, 2016, he announced he was leaving politics, saying that Mr. Péladeau's departure had prompted a reflection on his own career. He returned to work in the media, co-hosting a noon-hour radio show on FM93 in Quebec City with Éric Duhaime.

=== Coalition Avenir Québec ===
On June 7, 2022, it was announced that Drainville was running as a candidate for the CAQ in Lévis in the upcoming 2022 Quebec general election. He was re-elected in the riding of Lévis and appointed Minister of education.

In April 2023, he announced plans to ban prayer in all provincial public schools.

In 2025, he became the Minister of the Environment, the Fight Against Climate Change, Wildlife and Parks. Following the resignation of François Legault, Drainville entered the 2026 Coalition Avenir Québec leadership election in January, receiving several endorsements from his fellow caucus members. He placed second in the election, behind Christine Fréchette. She later appointed him as Minister of Economy, Innovation and Energy in her ministry. He lost his seat in the 2026 Quebec general election.

== Controversies ==
Parti Québécois (2012–2014)

During his time with the Parti Québécois, Bernard Drainville drew criticism for positions and projects considered controversial. He is notably associated with the Quebec Charter of Values initiative, introduced in 2013 when he was a minister in Pauline Marois’s minority government. The charter proposed banning the wearing of conspicuous religious symbols for certain public employees and requiring strict religious neutrality in public institutions, which sparked strong reactions in the media, intense public debate, and criticism from civil rights organizations, religious minority groups, and international civil liberties organizations. Political analysts also lamented that some of the language used in promoting the charter contributed to heightening identity-based tensions and polarizing public debate on secularism in Quebec.

Coalition Avenir Québec (2022– )

During his term as Minister of Education in the Coalition Avenir Québec government, Bernard Drainville faced public criticism concerning certain statements, his intervention style, and administrative decisions affecting the school system.

An article published in Le Journal de Québec in May 2023 lists several incidents that generated negative reactions in the media and among his political opponents. These include remarks considered awkward during debates comparing teachers’ salaries to those of Members of the National Assembly (with media recalling that in 2015, while in opposition, he considered a 31% pay increase for MNAs unjustified while government measures risked, in his view, “impoverishing nurses and teachers”); a tense exchange in the National Assembly with MNA Marwah Rizqy, during which he repeatedly called her a “demagogue” before leaving the chamber; public criticism directed at the director of a school service center following the announcement of closures of four-year-old kindergarten classes, after which he announced the postponement of 2,600 such closures; as well as his use of colloquial language (“bullshit”) in a media interview, considered inappropriate for a sitting minister. The article also recalls the controversy surrounding his defense of the third highway link project during the election campaign, marked by his statement, “Get off my back about GHGs!”, before the government abandoned the tunnel project a few months later. Observers also noted that some of his public interventions created the impression of reactive management of sensitive issues, contributing to criticism of his political communication within the education sector.

In 2023, he introduced Bill 23, which became An Act mainly to amend the Education Act and to enact the Act respecting the Institut national d’excellence en éducation, a reform of Quebec’s education system. The law was criticized by unions, researchers, and parent groups, who raised concerns about the centralization of pedagogical decision-making in favor of ministerial directives.

In 2025, the announcement of substantial budget cuts in the school network (up to approximately $570 million) and the implementation of spending freeze or redeployment measures triggered significant union and community mobilization. Two major education sector union federations, the Fédération autonome de l’enseignement (FAE) and the Centrale des syndicats du Québec (CSQ), denounced these measures and argued they would harm direct services to students. Some union leaders called for the minister to revise his management approach, going so far as to question his legitimacy in the position.

Criticism also came from parent coalitions, school committee groups, and administrators who formed alliances to pressure the government against budget restrictions, notably highlighting impacts on essential services and students’ educational experience.

In 2026, he continued to defend the third highway link project during his campaign for the leadership of the Coalition Avenir Québec and for the position of premier, stating that “being in the CAQ means being in favor of the third link,” a declaration that drew criticism from within his own political party.

== Electoral record ==
2022 Quebec general election: Lévis
Party	Candidate	Votes	%	±%
Coalition Avenir Québec	Bernard Drainville	18,051	48.79	–8.50
Conservative	Karine Laflamme	7,677	20.75	+18.00
Parti Québécois	Pierre-Gilles Morel	4,775	12.91	+2.66
Québec solidaire	Valérie Cayouette-Guilloteau	4,244	11.47	–0.27
Liberal	Richard Garon	1,899	5.13	–9.33
Green	Mehdi Lahlou	213	0.58	–1.48
Climat Québec	André Voyer	138	0.37	–
Total valid votes		36,997	98.64	+0.17
Total rejected ballots		511	1.36	–0.17
Turnout		37,508	73.73	+2.33
Electors on the lists		50,875	–	–

2014 Quebec general election
Party	Candidate	Votes	%	±%
Parti Québécois	Bernard Drainville	11,614	38.17	-8.94
Liberal	Jean-Guy Tremblay	7,926	26.05	+8.51
Coalition Avenir Québec	Guillaume Provencher	6,269	20.60	-1.02
Québec solidaire	Carl Lévesque	3,518	11.56	+3.35
Green	Catherine Lovatt-Smith	707	2.32	+0.35
Option nationale	Fabien Villemaire	244	0.80	-1.73
Marxist–Leninist	Pierre Chénier	107	0.35	–
Équipe Autonomiste	Florent Portron	44	0.14	
Total valid votes		30,429	98.09	
Total rejected ballots		591	1.91	+0.44
Turnout		31,020	66.32	-5.55
Electors on the lists		46,770	–	
Parti Québécois hold		Swing		-8.72

2012 Quebec general election
Party	Candidate	Votes	%	±%
Parti Québécois	Bernard Drainville	15,506	47.10	-4.00
Coalition Avenir Québec	Simon Jolin-Barrette	7,119	21.63	+10.30
Liberal	Farida Chemmakh	5,773	17.54	-11.77
Québec solidaire	Carl Lévesque	2,702	8.21	+3.83
Option nationale	Olivier Chauvin	832	2.53	
Green	Mathieu Yargeau	648	1.97	-1.09
Coalition pour la constituante	Jean Baillargeon	244	0.74	–
Parti indépendantiste	Yves Ménard	94	0.29	-0.54
Total valid votes		32,918	98.54	
Total rejected ballots		489	1.46	
Turnout		33,407	71.88	
Electors on the lists		46,478	–	
Parti Québécois hold		Swing		-7.15

2008 Quebec general election: Marie-Victorin
Party	Candidate	Votes	%	±%
Parti Québécois	Bernard Drainville	11,026	51.56	+11.96
Liberal	Isabelle Mercille	6,185	28.92	+7.52
Action démocratique	Roger Dagenais	2,369	11.08	-17.32
Québec solidaire	Sebastien Robert	957	4.48	-0.60
Green	Real Langelier	665	3.11	-1.64
Parti indépendantiste	Yves Menard	182	0.85	
Total valid votes		21,384	98.22	
Total rejected ballots		388	1.78	+0.52
Turnout		21,772	53.29	-15.26
Electors on the lists		40,858	–	
Parti Québécois hold		Swing		+2.22

2007 Quebec general election: Marie-Victorin
Party	Candidate	Votes	%	±%
Parti Québécois	Bernard Drainville	11,055	39.61	-5.78
Action démocratique	Roger Dagenais	7,927	28.40	+12.81
Liberal	Nic Leblanc	5,974	21.40	-13.52
Québec solidaire	Cyr François	1,418	5.08	+3.47
Green	Réal Langelier	1,327	4.75	
Bloc Pot	Richard Lemagnifique	211	0.76	-0.89
Total valid votes		27,912	98.74	
Total rejected ballots		357	1.26	-0.43
Turnout		28,269	68.54	+1.50
Electors on the lists		41,242	–	
Parti Québécois hold		Swing		-9.30
