= Jean-François Arsenault =

Quebec politician

Jean-François Arsenault MNA

Member of the National Assembly for Granby
- Incumbent
- Assumed office October 5, 2026
- Preceded by: François Bonnardel

Personal details
- Party: Parti Québécois
- Education: HEC Montréal

Jean-François Arsenault is a Quebec politician who was the elected to the National Assembly of Quebec for Granby in the 2026 Quebec general election as a member of the Parti Québécois. He is a graduate of a certificate in sustainable development from HEC Montréal. He is a former president of the Haute-Yamaska Chamber of Commerce and Industry.
