= Canada–Québec Accord relating to Immigration and Temporary Admission of Aliens =

Canada–Quebec Accord relating to Immigration and Temporary Admission of Aliens
- Signed: February 5, 1991
- Effective: April 1, 1991
- Replaces: Cullen-Couture agreement
- Signatories: Canada; Quebec
- Languages: English; French

The Canada–Quebec Accord relating to Immigration and Temporary Admission of Aliens (French: Accord Canada-Québec relatif à l’immigration et à l’admission temporaire des aubains) is a legal agreement concerning immigration issues between the federal Government of Canada and the provincial Government of Quebec.

The arrangement gives Quebec the exclusive responsibility of choosing immigrants and refugees still living in their own countries but wishing to relocate to the province. The agreement was signed by federal ministers Barbara McDougall and Benoît Bouchard, and included an immediate transfer of $332 million to Quebec to help integrate newcomers. Quebec has also been given assurances by the Government of Canada to receive a number of immigrants proportional to its demographic weight within the confederation.

The broad accord signed in 1991 preceded similar agreements with other provinces including British Columbia and Manitoba. Under this agreement, selected applicants are issued a "certificat de sélection du Québec". Immigrants who settle also can be required by Québec's provincial government, to send their children to French-language schools. Citizenship and Immigration Canada issues the actual visa after background and health verifications. Other provinces also have agreements with the federal government in that they can nominate individuals for immigration purposes, similar to the way Quebec does.

New immigrants are entitled to settlement assistance such as free language training under provincial government administered programs usually called Language Instruction for Newcomers to Canada (LINC), for which the federal government has budgeted about $350 million to give to the provinces for the fiscal year 2006-2007. The majority of the $350 million is allocated to Quebec under the Canada–Quebec Accord, at $196 million per year, even though immigration to Quebec represented only 16.5% of all immigration to Canada in 2005. The $350 million is budgeted to increase by an additional $90 million by 2009.

== Proposed reform ==
During the 2022 Quebec general election, the Coalition Avenir Québec (CAQ) government of François Legault which increased its majority ran on getting more immigration powers from Canada to the Province of Quebec. Legault has raised the idea of even having referendum on immigration powers.

After their election win they repeated their pledge for Quebec getting more immigration powers.

== See also ==
- Ministry of Immigration, Francisation and Integration
