= Ian Lafrenière =

Canadian politician

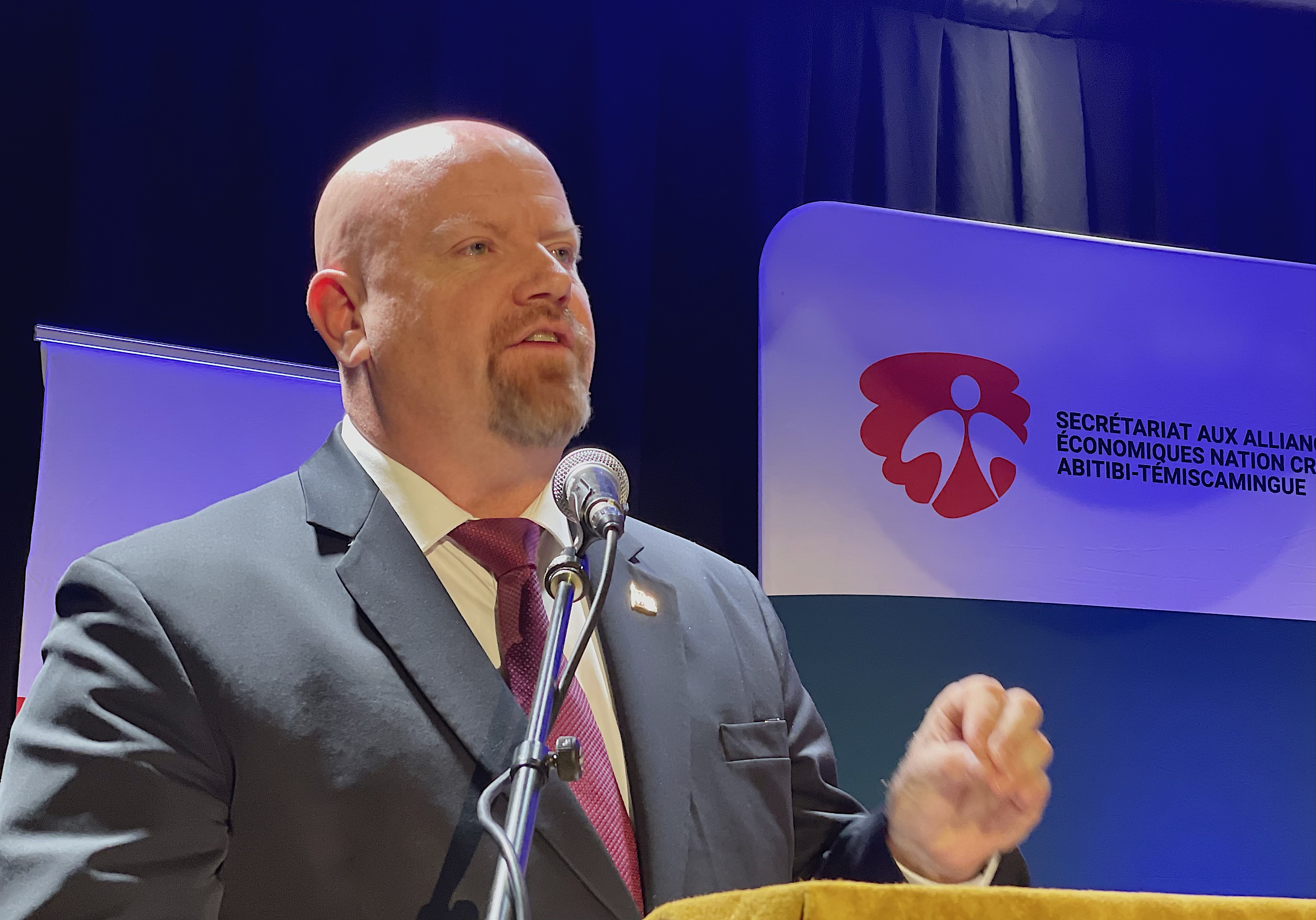
- Lafrenière in 2022

Deputy Premier of Quebec
- In office April 21, 2026 – October 21, 2026
- Premier: Christine Fréchette
- Preceded by: Geneviève Guilbault
- Succeeded by: Catherine Gentilcore

Quebec Minister of Public Security
- In office September 10, 2025 – October 21, 2026
- Premier: François Legault; Christine Fréchette
- Preceded by: François Bonnardel
- Succeeded by: Guy Lapointe

Member of the National Assembly of Quebec for Vachon
- In office October 1, 2018 – August 27, 2026
- Preceded by: Martine Ouellet
- Succeeded by: Stephan Fogaing

Personal details
- Born: 1972 (age 53–54) Granby, Quebec, Canada
- Party: Coalition Avenir Québec

Ian Lafrenière MNA is a Canadian politician who was elected to the National Assembly of Quebec in the 2018 provincial election. He represents the electoral district of Vachon as a member of the Coalition Avenir Québec. Prior to entering provincial politics, he worked as the public affairs officer for the Service de police de la Ville de Montréal. In the Legault ministry he was appointed as minister of Public Security, and in the Fréchette ministry, he became deputy premier of Quebec.

== Electoral record ==
2022 Quebec general election: Vachon
Party	Candidate	Votes	%	±%
Coalition Avenir Québec	Ian Lafrenière	15,984	44.91	
Liberal	Yves Mbattang	5,718	16.07	
Québec solidaire	Jean-Philippe Samson	5,343	15.01	
Parti Québécois	Adam Wrzesien	4,757	13.37	
Conservative	Martine Boucher	3,166	8.90	
Green	Juan Carlos Nino Caita	404	1.14	–
Climat Québec	Jean-Pierre Lacombe	217	0.61	–
Total valid votes		35,589	98.64	–
Total rejected ballots		491	1.36	–
Turnout		36,080	68.37	
Electors on the lists		52,770	–	–
Source(s) "Résultats des élections générales du 3 octobre 2022". Élections Québec.

2018 Quebec general election: Vachon
Party	Candidate	Votes	%	±%
Coalition Avenir Québec	Ian Lafrenière	15,625	43.61	+18.33
Liberal	Linda Caron	7,536	21.03	-11.55
Parti Québécois	Patrick Ney	6,106	17.04	-16.02
Québec solidaire	André Vincent	5,194	14.5	+7.21
New Democratic	Ian Lecourtois	453	1.26	
Conservative	Lise des Greniers	436	1.22	
Bloc Pot	Hugo Bluntss	278	0.78	
Citoyens au pouvoir	Stéphane Marginean	200	0.56	
Total valid votes		35,828	98.15	
Total rejected ballots		676	1.85	
Turnout		36,504	70.86	
Eligible voters		51,519		
Coalition Avenir Québec gain from Parti Québécois		Swing		+14.94
Source(s) "Rapport des résultats officiels du scrutin". Élections Québec.
