= François Bonnardel =

Canadian politician (born 1967)

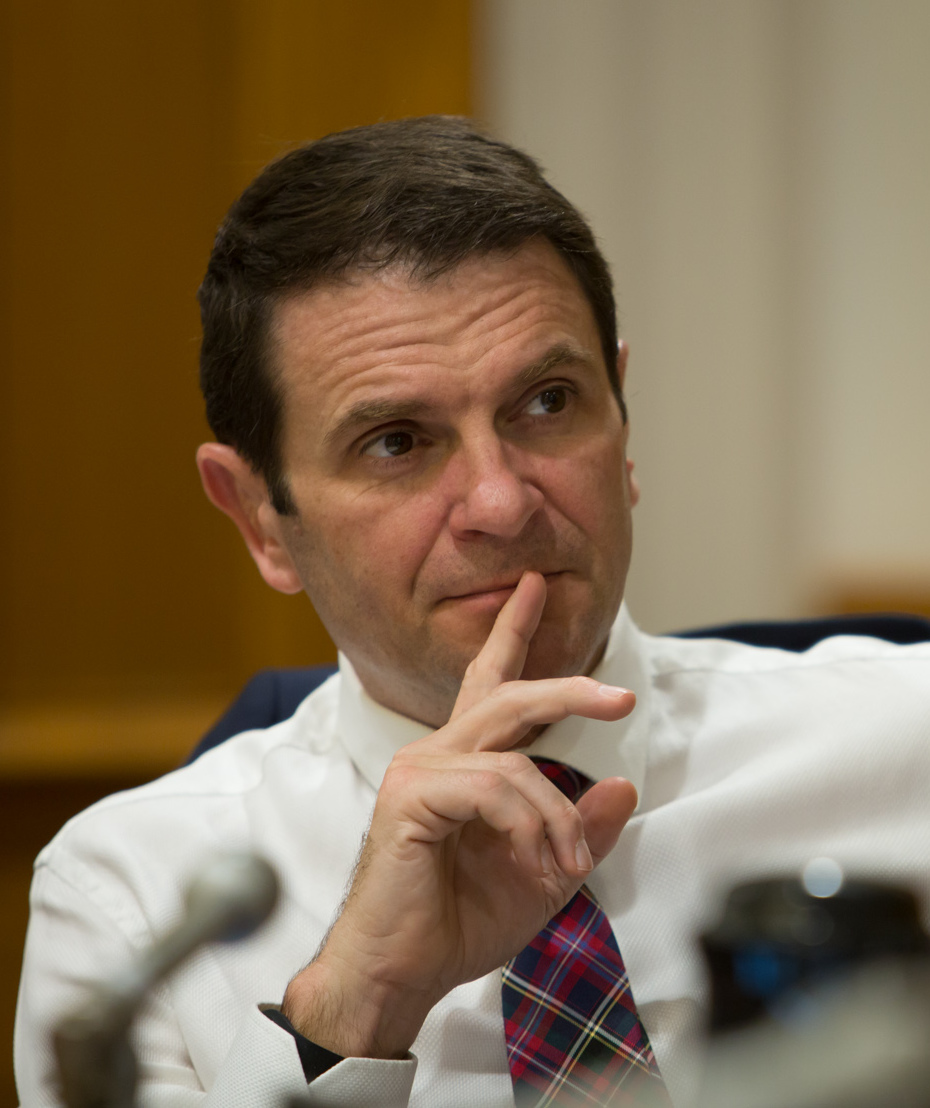
- Bonnardel in 2015

Government House Leader
- In office April 21, 2026 – August 27, 2026
- Preceded by: Simon Jolin-Barrette
- Succeeded by: Catherine Gentilcore

Quebec Minister of Immigration, Francisation and Integration
- In office April 21, 2026 – August 27, 2026
- Preceded by: Jean-François Roberge
- Succeeded by: Catherine Gentilcore

Quebec Minister of Public Security
- In office October 20, 2022 – September 10, 2025
- Preceded by: Geneviève Guilbault
- Succeeded by: Ian Lafrenière

Quebec Minister of Transport
- In office October 18, 2018 – October 20, 2022
- Premier: Francois Legault
- Preceded by: André Fortin
- Succeeded by: Geneviève Guilbault

Member of the National Assembly of Quebec for Granby
- In office September 4, 2012 – August 27, 2026
- Preceded by: Riding established
- Succeeded by: Jean-François Arsenault

Member of the National Assembly of Quebec for Shefford
- In office March 26, 2007 – September 3, 2012
- Preceded by: Bernard Brodeur
- Succeeded by: Riding dissolved

Personal details
- Born: November 8, 1967 (age 59) Verdun, Quebec, Canada
- Party: Coalition Avenir Québec (since 2012)
- Other political affiliations: Action démocratique du Québec (2007–2012)

François Bonnardel (French pronunciation: [fʁɑ̃swa bɔnaʁdɛl]; born November 8, 1967) is a Canadian politician. He served as a member of the National Assembly of Quebec for the riding of Granby from 2012 to 2026. He previously represented Shefford from 2007 to 2012.

He was a member of the now-defunct Action démocratique du Québec (ADQ) party, and later represented the Coalition Avenir Québec (CAQ), following the merger of the ADQ with the CAQ. On October 18, 2018, he was appointed as Minister of Transport in Quebec Premier François Legault's cabinet. Following the CAQ's re-election in 2022, he was appointed as Minister of Public Security. Newly-installed Premier Christine Fréchette appointed him Minister of Immigration, Francisation and Integration in 2026.

== Political career ==
Bonnardel was first elected in the riding of Shefford in the 2007 election with 42% of the vote after a late surge vaulted the ADQ to Official Opposition status. Liberal incumbent Bernard Brodeur finished second with 28% of the vote.

On March 29, 2007, Bonnardel was appointed Opposition House Whip.

Bonnardel was considered a potential candidate in the 2009 ADQ leadership race, but ultimately endorsed, and became a campaign chair for, Gilles Taillon. Taillon won the leadership, but as he was not a sitting MNA, Bonnardel served as the party's leader in the National Assembly.

On January 23, 2012, he was named a member of the Coalition Avenir Québec party executive.

Due to riding redistribution, the riding of Shefford was split, and Bonnardel was elected in the new riding of Granby in the 2012 election. In the 2014 election, Bonnardel won his riding with a larger majority than any other CAQ candidate (10,881 votes over the second-place candidate, Joanne Lalumière of the Parti québécois). In April 2014, he was appointed CAQ House Leader.

After the CAQ formed government in 2018, Bonnardel became Transport Minister. In 2022, he became Public Security Minister, where he was sacked after the SAAQclic scandal. In the Fréchette ministry, he became Government House Leader and Minister of Immigration, Francisation and Integration. He did not seek re-election in the 2026 general election.

== Personal life ==
Bonnardel was born in Verdun, Quebec. Bonnardel's father was born in Marseille, France. His mother is from Lac-Saint-Jean, Quebec.

After studies at the Collège militaire royal de Saint-Jean and the Cégep du Vieux Montréal in sciences, Bonnardel was a clerk for personal and business finances and was also a manager and owner of local auto part companies in Granby. He was also a member of the Brome-Missisquoi and Haute-Yamaska Chambers of Commerce in the Eastern Townships region and an organization committee member for the Canadian Red Cross (Quebec Division).

On April 23, 2009, Bonnardel and Nathalie Normandeau, the Deputy Premier of Quebec and a member of the Liberal government, announced that they were dating. The unusual relationship, between a government minister and one of the government's opposition critics, ended in 2010.

== Electoral record ==
2022 Quebec general election: Granby
| Party | Candidate | Votes | % | ±% |
|---|---|---|---|---|
| Coalition Avenir Québec | François Bonnardel | 21,515 | 58.19 | -4.19 |
| Québec solidaire | Anne-Sophie Legault | 5,282 | 14.29 | +0.26 |
| Parti Québécois | Guy Bouthillier | 4,378 | 11.84 | +2.19 |
| Conservative | Stéphane Bernier | 3,737 | 10.11 | +9.12 |
| Liberal | Penny Lamarre | 1,758 | 4.76 | -9.27 |
| Green | Andrzej Wisniowski | 263 | 0.71 | -0.76 |
| Équipe Autonomiste | Jimmy Paquin | 38 | 0.10 | – |
| Total valid votes | | 36,971 | 98.78 | – |
| Total rejected ballots | | 458 | 1.22 | – |
| Turnout | | 37,429 | 68.14 | |
| Electors on the lists | | 54,933 | | |

2018 Quebec general election: Granby
| Party | Candidate | Votes | % | ±% |
|---|---|---|---|---|
| Coalition Avenir Québec | François Bonnardel | 22,570 | 62.38 | +9.34 |
| Québec solidaire | Anne-Sophie Legault | 5,075 | 14.03 | +9.53 |
| Liberal | Lyne Laverdure | 3,881 | 10.73 | -8.45 |
| Parti Québécois | Chantal Beauchemin | 3,491 | 9.65 | -12.3 |
| Green | Daphné Poulin | 531 | 1.47 | – |
| Conservative | Pierre Bélanger | 358 | 0.99 | – |
| Parti nul | Stéphane Deschamps | 158 | 0.44 | -0.37 |
| Bloc Pot | Kevin Robidas | 119 | 0.33 | – |
| Total valid votes | | 36,183 | 98.78 | |
| Total rejected ballots | | 448 | 1.22 | |
| Turnout | | 36,631 | 69.82 | +0.31 |
| Eligible voters | | 52,468 | | |
| Coalition Avenir Québec hold | | Swing | | -0.095 |
Source(s) "Rapport des résultats officiels du scrutin". Élections Québec.

2014 Quebec general election
| Party | Candidate | Votes | % |
|---|---|---|---|
| Coalition Avenir Québec | François Bonnardel | 18,441 | 53.04 |
| Parti Québécois | Joanne Lalumière | 7,630 | 21.95 |
| Liberal | Pascal Proulx | 6,669 | 19.18 |
| Québec solidaire | André Beauregard | 1,565 | 4.50 |
| Parti nul | Stéphane Deschamps | 281 | 0.81 |
| Option nationale | Jocelyn Beaudoin | 179 | 0.51 |
| Total valid votes | | 34,765 | 98.75 |
| Total rejected ballots | | 440 | 1.25 |
| Turnout | | 35,205 | 69.51 |
| Electors on the lists | | 50,650 | – |

2012 Quebec general election
| Party | Candidate | Votes | % |
|---|---|---|---|
| Coalition Avenir Québec | François Bonnardel | 19,517 | 52.14 |
| Parti Québécois | Luc Perron | 8,502 | 22.71 |
| Liberal | Guy Gaudord | 6,051 | 16.17 |
| Québec solidaire | Éric Bédard | 2,121 | 5.67 |
| Option nationale | Jocelyn Beaudoin | 477 | 1.27 |
| Conservative | Stéphane Gagné | 368 | 0.98 |
| Parti nul | Stéphane Deschamps | 261 | 0.70 |
| Coalition pour la constituante | Francine St-Onge | 135 | 0.36 |
| Total valid votes | | 37,432 | 98.76 |
| Total rejected ballots | | 471 | 1.24 |
| Turnout | | 37,903 | 76.13 |
| Electors on the lists | | 49,786 | – |

2008 Quebec general election
| Party | Candidate | Votes | % | ±% |
|---|---|---|---|---|
| Action démocratique | François Bonnardel | 11,271 | 34.63 | |
| Liberal | Jean-Claude Tremblay | 11,201 | 34.42 | |
| Parti Québécois | Jean-François Arseneault | 8,019 | 24.64 | |
| Québec solidaire | Ginette Moreau | 1,085 | 3.33 | |
| Green | Martin Giard | 789 | 2.42 | – |
| Independent | Lucie Piédalue | 181 | 0.56 | |
