= Commission municipale du Québec =

Quasi-judicial body in Quebec, Canada

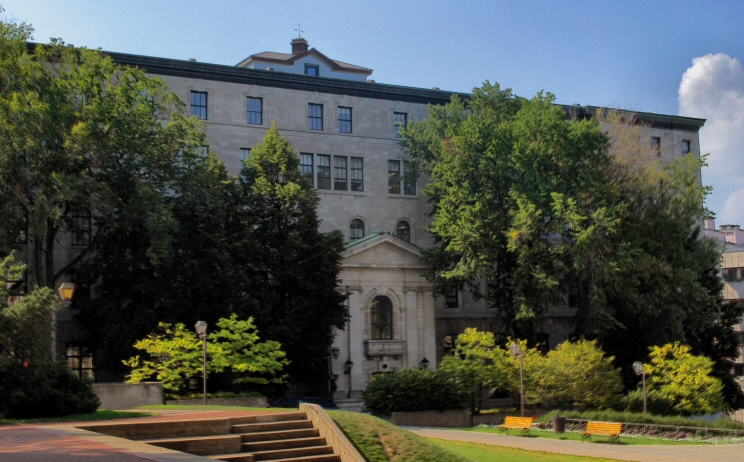
Headquarters of Commission municipale du Québec, 10 Rue Pierre-Olivier-Chauveau le

The Commission municipale du Québec (French pronunciation: [kɔmisjɔ̃ mynisipal dy kebɛk], Quebec Municipal Commission) is a quasi-judicial body that oversees municipal matters in the Canadian province of Quebec. The commission was founded in 1932 by the government of Louis-Alexandre Taschereau.

The commission administers municipalities that have been placed under trusteeship. In 2013, the commission temporarily oversaw municipal affairs in Laval, Quebec's third-largest municipality, when its government was implicated in a corruption scandal.
