= École secondaire Chavigny =

Location
- 365, rue Chavigny; Trois-Rivières, Quebec, G9B 1A7; Canada
- Coordinates: 46.311792°N 72.580243°W

Information
- School district: Centre de service scolaire du Chemin-du-Roy csscdr.gouv.qc.ca
- Principal: Jonathan Bradley
- Website: chavigny.csscdr.gouv.qc.ca

École secondaire Chavigny is a French-language high school in Trois-Rivières, Quebec, Canada which is operated by the Centre de service scolaire du Chemin-du-Roy.

The school's principal is Jonathan Bradley. The school has a strong theatre department.
