= Amélie Dionne =

Canadian politician

Member of the National Assembly of Quebec for Rivière-du-Loup–Témiscouata
- In office October 3, 2022 – October 5, 2026
- Preceded by: Denis Tardif
- Succeeded by: Ariane Boyer

Personal details
- Born: 1975 (age 50–51) Rivière-du-Loup, Quebec, Canada
- Party: Coalition Avenir Québec

Amélie Dionne (born 1975) is a Canadian politician, who was elected to the National Assembly of Quebec in the 2022 Quebec general election. She represented the riding of Rivière-du-Loup–Témiscouata as a member of the Coalition Avenir Québec until 2026. She became Minister of Tourism in 2026 under Premier Christine Fréchette.

She served on Rivière-du-Loup City Council from 2009 to 2013.

== Electoral record ==
2026 Quebec general election: Rivière-du-Loup–Témiscouata–Les Basques
** Preliminary results — Not yet official **
| Party | Candidate | Votes | % | ±% |
|---|---|---|---|---|
| Parti Québécois | Ariane Boyer | 12,745 | 35.29 | |
| Conservative | Louise Moreault | 8,306 | 23.00 | |
| Coalition Avenir Québec | Amélie Dionne | 7,110 | 19.69 | |
| Liberal | Karine Malenfant | 5,189 | 14.37 | |
| Québec solidaire | Pierre-Erik Isabelle | 2,434 | 6.74 | |
| Climat Québec | Carole Sierpien | 330 | 0.91 | |
| Total valid votes | | | | |
| Total rejected ballots | | | | |
| Turnout | | | 70.23 | |
| Electors on the lists | | | – | – |
| Parti Québécois gain from Coalition Avenir Québec | | Swing | | +20.43 |
Source: Élections Québec

2022 Quebec general election: Rivière-du-Loup-Témiscouata
| Party | Candidate | Votes | % | ±% |
|---|---|---|---|---|
| Coalition Avenir Québec | Amélie Dionne | 18,183 | 52.06 | +12.88 |
| Parti Québécois | Félix Rioux | 6,141 | 17.58 | +2.33 |
| Québec solidaire | Myriam Lapointe-Gagnon | 5,102 | 14.61 | +3.58 |
| Conservative | Louise Moreault | 3,937 | 11.27 | +10.18 |
| Liberal | Louis Bellemare | 1,388 | 3.97 | –29.49 |
| Climat Québec | Carole Sierpien | 174 | 0.50 | New |
| Total valid votes | | 34,925 | 98.95 | |
| Total rejected ballots | | 369 | 1.05 | –0.62 |
| Turnout | | 35,294 | 68.89 | –0.52 |
| Electors on the lists | | 51,230 | | |
| Coalition Avenir Québec hold | | Swing | | +5.28 |
Source: Élections Québec
