= Christine Fréchette =

Premier of Quebec in 2026

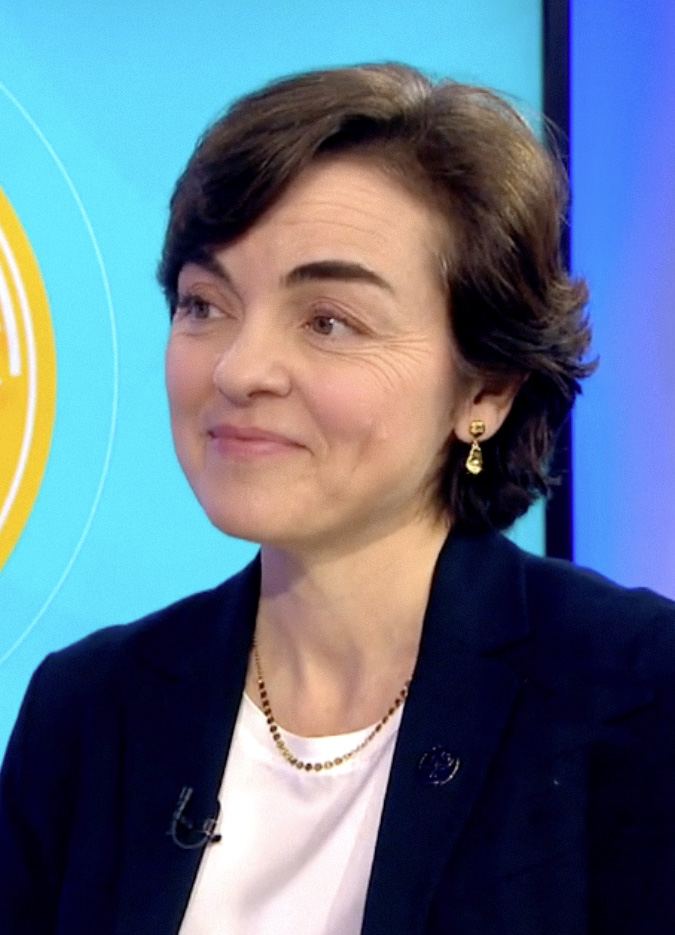
- Fréchette in 2024

33rd Premier of Quebec
- In office April 15, 2026 – October 21, 2026
- Monarch: Charles III
- Lieutenant Governor: Manon Jeannotte
- Deputy: Ian Lafrenière
- Preceded by: François Legault
- Succeeded by: Paul St-Pierre Plamondon

Leader of the Coalition Avenir Québec
- In office April 12, 2026 – October 6, 2026
- President: Sarah Beaumier
- Preceded by: François Legault
- Succeeded by: Mathieu Lévesque (interim)
Ministerial positions
Minister of Economy, Innovation and Energy
In office September 5, 2024 – January 26, 2026
| Premier | François Legault |
| Preceded by | Pierre Fitzgibbon |
| Succeeded by | Jean Boulet |
Minister of Immigration, Francisation and Integration
In office October 20, 2022 – September 5, 2024
| Premier | François Legault |
| Preceded by | Jean Boulet |
| Succeeded by | Jean-François Roberge |
Minister responsible for the Montérégie region
In office November 5, 2025 – January 26, 2026
| Premier | François Legault |
| Preceded by | Lionel Carmant |
| Succeeded by | Jean-François Roberge |
Minister responsible for Regional Economic Development
In office September 5, 2024 – September 10, 2025
| Premier | François Legault |
| Preceded by | Pierre Fitzgibbon |
| Succeeded by | Éric Girard |
Minister responsible for the Metropolis and the Montreal region
In office September 5, 2024 – September 10, 2025
| Premier | François Legault |
| Preceded by | Pierre Fitzgibbon |
| Succeeded by | Chantal Rouleau |

Member of the National Assembly for Sanguinet
- In office October 3, 2022 – August 27, 2026
- Preceded by: Danielle McCann
- Succeeded by: Alain Therrien

Personal details
- Born: August 15, 1970 (age 56) Trois-Rivières, Quebec, Canada
- Party: Coalition Avenir Québec
- Other political affiliations: Parti Québécois (until 2014); Vision Montreal (2009)
- Spouse: Guy Nadeau
- Children: 1
- Education: HEC Montréal (BBA); Université Laval (MA)
- Occupation: Political analyst; administrator; politician; businesswoman; consultant; political staffer
- Cabinet: Fréchette ministry

Christine Fréchette (/freɪˈʃɛt/ fray-SHET; French pronunciation: [fʁeʃɛt]; born August 15, 1970) is a Canadian politician and businesswoman who served as the 33rd premier of Quebec and leader of the Coalition Avenir Québec (CAQ) from April to October 2026. She served as a member of the National Assembly of Quebec representing the electoral district of Sanguinet from 2022 to 2026.

In the Legault ministry, Fréchette served in several positions, including as Minister of Immigration, Francisation and Integration and Minister of Economy, Innovation and Energy. She was elected leader of the CAQ in April 2026 following the resignation of François Legault, becoming the second female premier of the province after Pauline Marois.

== Life and education ==
Christine Fréchette was born in 1970 in Trois-Rivières, Quebec. Her mother's family is originally from La Baie, a borough in Saguenay, Quebec. She spent her youth in the Mauricie region, where she attended high school at École secondaire Chavigny and college at Cégep de Trois-Rivières. She then obtained a Bachelor of Business Administration (Economics and International Trade) from HEC Montréal in 1992 and a master's degree in international relations from Université Laval in 1994.

== Professional career ==
From 1995 to 1996, Fréchette was research and information coordinator at the Fédération étudiante universitaire du Québec. In 1996, she represented university students during a summit on the social and economic future of Quebec. The same year, she began working for the National Assembly as international affairs advisor to the parliamentary conference of the Americas, and as administrative secretary to the Franco-Quebec interparliamentary commission.

From 2000 to 2002, Fréchette was a consultant to the Conseil supérieur de la langue française. She continued her work as a public affairs consultant in private practice from 2002 to 2008. In 2002, she founded the North American Forum on Integration and was president of this organization until 2011. From 2007 to 2012, Fréchette worked for the Centre d'études et de recherches internationales de l'Université de Montréal (CÉRIUM) as coordinator of the study centers of the United States and Mexico.

From 2008 to 2012, Fréchette was a political analyst in the media, working for Groupe TVA, Société Radio-Canada, RDI, Radio 98,5 FM and Radio 93,3 FM. In 2012, Fréchette joined the office of the Parti Québécois's (PQ) Jean-François Lisée, who was minister for international relations, as a press attachée and deputy chief of staff.

She left the PQ after it introduced the Quebec Charter of Values. Fréchette defended her decision by pointing out that the CAQ also opposed the bill. Fréchette later pursued her career with Montréal International as director of external and institutional relations until 2016. Subsequently, from 2016 to 2021, she was president of the Eastern Montreal Chamber of Commerce.

== Political career ==
Fréchette ran for Vision Montreal in the 2009 Montreal municipal election in the DeLorimier district of Le Plateau-Mont-Royal, placing second to Carl Boileau of Projet Montreal. In the 2021 Montreal municipal election, Fréchette considered running in the borough of Rivière-des-Prairies–Pointe-aux-Trembles with Denis Coderre's Ensemble Montréal, but she decided against it.

=== Legault ministry (2022–2026) ===
In August 2022, Coalition Avenir Québec (CAQ) leader François Legault announced Fréchette as his party's candidate in the electoral district of Sanguinet in the 2022 general election. She was considered a high-profile candidate for the party. She was elected, receiving 48.8% of the vote and defeating Daphnée Paquin-Auger of the PQ.

Following her election as an MNA, Fréchette was appointed to the Legault ministry as Minister of Immigration, Francisation and Integration. She soon became responsible for discussions with the federal Minister of Immigration Marc Miller, around quotas for family reunification. On December 13, 2023, Fréchette and Miller were served with formal legal notices following her implementation of quotas on family reunification. These quotas resulted in processing wait times of 42 months in Quebec, compared to 10 to 12 months in the rest of Canada, and created a record backlog in the family reunification category, reaching over 38,000 applications, mostly involving spouses and children. The legal notice argues, on one hand, that the provincial government does not have the authority to impose quotas on family reunification, and on the other hand, that the federal government should not comply with these quotas, as they violate the Canada–Quebec Agreement on immigration. According to Miller, the delays are directly linked to the quotas imposed by Quebec. On February 29, 2024, an application for judicial review was filed in Superior Court against Fréchette, as no solution had been found 60 days after the legal notice.

In September 2024, she succeeded Pierre Fitzgibbon as Minister responsible for the Metropolis and the Montreal region, Minister responsible for Regional Economic Development, and Minister of Economy, Innovation and Energy. In 2025, she was relieved of the two former roles and gained the position of Minister responsible for the Montérégie region later that year following Lionel Carmant's resignation.

==== 2026 Coalition Avenir Québec leadership campaign ====
Following the resignation of François Legault, Fréchette announced her candidacy in the 2026 Coalition Avenir Québec leadership election at an event in Trois-Rivières on January 25, 2026. She relinquished her Cabinet positions after announcing her campaign. During the announcement, Fréchette said she would defend the values of the party by describing them as for "an effective state, a strong economy, and a well-defined identity" in Quebec.

Fréchette has been described as a synthesis between the economic and nationalist factions of the CAQ. She also received the most caucus endorsements of any candidate during the race. During the campaign, she stated her support for the cancelled Programme de l'expérience québécoise (PEQ) and for shale gas exploration in the province. Fréchette also promised to increase education budget inline with inflation.

On April 12, she was elected leader of the party, with 57.9% of the vote, defeating Bernard Drainville. Fréchette is the first female and second overall CAQ leader.

=== Premier of Quebec (2026) ===
After winning the CAQ leadership election, she was sworn in on April 15, 2026. She is also the first Generation X premier of the province. Her first acts as premier included a meeting with prime minister Mark Carney, cost-of-living measures, support for first-time homebuyers and small and medium enterprises, maintaining a ban on the sale, purchase, and distribution of American alcoholic beverages, healthcare announcements, and renewing the notwithstanding clause protections around Bill 96. Her ministry was sworn-in on April 21, including multiple changes from the previous government and Ian Lafrenière as deputy premier. In August 2026, she announced an updated Churchill Falls Generating Station agreement with Newfoundland and Labrador premier Tony Wakeham and prime minister Carney, renegotiating the 1969 agreement and the scrapped 2024 memorandum of understanding. If ratified, the deal would be valued at nearly $70 billion.

==== 2026 general election ====
Rather than seeking re-election in Sanguinet, Fréchette announced in July 2026 that she would instead stand as a candidate in Trois-Rivières, where she grew up. On August 27, Fréchette advised lieutenant governor Manon Jeannotte to dissolve the National Assembly and call a general election for October 5, 2026. In the election, the CAQ lost all its seats in the National Assembly, ending Fréchette's premiership. Fréchette herself lost Trois-Rivières by just over 500 votes to a PQ challenger. Accepting responsibility for the worst defeat of a sitting government in Quebec history, Fréchette announced the following day she would step down as CAQ leader.

== Personal life ==
Fréchette is married to financier Guy Nadeau and has a son.

== Electoral history ==
=== Provincial elections ===
2026 Quebec general election: Trois-Rivières
| Party | Candidate | Votes | % | ±% |
|---|---|---|---|---|
| Parti Québécois | Jean Pellerin | 10,107 | 27.10 | +12.76 |
| Coalition Avenir Québec | Christine Fréchette | 9,608 | 25.76 | -25.05 |
| Conservative | Jonathan Couturier | 6,745 | 18.08 | +5.82 |
| Liberal | Valérie Renaud-Martin | 6,220 | 16.68 | +11.14 |
| Québec solidaire | Steven Roy Cullen | 4,181 | 11.21 | -5.14 |
| Parti nul | Béatrice Lafontaine | 195 | 0.52 | – |
| Climat Québec | Nancy Nadon | 164 | 0.44 | +0.04 |
| Bloc Pot | Jean Gagnon Savard | 79 | 0.21 | – |
| Total valid votes | | 37,299 | 98.73 | |
| Total rejected ballots | | 481 | 1.27 | |
| Turnout | | 37,780 | 69.75 | |
| Electors on the lists | | 54,168 | | |
| Parti Québécois gain from Coalition Avenir Québec | | Swing | | +18.91 |

2022 Quebec general election: Sanguinet
| Party | Candidate | Votes | % | ±% |
|---|---|---|---|---|
| Coalition Avenir Québec | Christine Fréchette | 14,607 | 48.8 | +5.26 |
| Parti Québécois | Daphnée Paquin-Auger | 4,882 | 16.3 | -11.67 |
| Québec solidaire | Virginie Bernier | 3,925 | 13.1 | -1.62 |
| Conservative | François Gibeault | 3,164 | 10.6 | +9.41 |
| Liberal | Rodrigue Asatsop | 2,952 | 9.9 | -4.08 |
| Green | Halimatou Bah | 325 | 1.1 | -0.43 |
| Climat Québec | Martine Lajoie | 58 | 0.2 | – |
| Marxist–Leninist | Hélène Héroux | 31 | 0.1 | -0.17 |
| Total valid votes | | 29,944 | – | |
| Total rejected ballots | | 417 | – | |
| Turnout | | 30,361 | 69.8 | -2.65 |
| Electors on the lists | | | – | – |
| Coalition Avenir Québec hold | | Swing | | |

=== Leadership elections ===
2026 Coalition Avenir Québec leadership election
| Candidate | Vote share |
|---|---|
| Christine Fréchette | 57.9% |
| Bernard Drainville | 42.1% |
| Total | 100.0% |

=== Municipal elections ===
2009 Montreal municipal election: Borough councillor, De Lorimier
| Party | Candidate | Votes | % | ±% |
|---|---|---|---|---|
| Projet Montréal | Carl Boileau | 5,242 | 48.12 | +11.81 |
| Vision Montreal | Christine Fréchette | 4,168 | 38.26 | +11.00 |
| Union Montreal | Nicolas Kobrynsky | 1,484 | 13.62 | −22.80 |
| Total valid votes | | 10,894 | 96.95 | – |
| Total rejected ballots | | 343 | 3.05 | – |
| Turnout | | 11,237 | 47.61 | – |
| Electors on the lists | | 23,602 | – | – |
Source: Election results, 2009, City of Montreal.

Political offices
| Preceded by Jean Boulet | Minister of Immigration, Francisation and Integration; 2022–2024 | Succeeded by Jean-François Roberge |
| Preceded by Pierre Fitzgibbon | Minister of Economy, Innovation and Energy; 2024–2026 | Succeeded by Jean Boulet |
| Preceded by François Legault | Leader of Coalition Avenir Québec; 2026–2026 | Succeeded by |
| Preceded by François Legault | Premier of Quebec; 2026–2026 | Succeeded by Paul St-Pierre Plamondon |
