= Granby (electoral district) =

Provincial electoral district in Quebec, Canada

Quebec electoral district
- Coordinates: 45.409°N 72.736°W

Provincial electoral district
- Legislature: National Assembly of Quebec
MNA
Jean-François Arsenault
Parti Québécois
- District created: 2011
- First contested: 2012
- Last contested: 2026

Demographics
- Electors (2012): 49,657
- Area (km²): 155.1
- Census division: La Haute-Yamaska
- Census subdivision: Granby

Granby (Canadian French: [ɡʁanbi]) is a provincial electoral district in the Montérégie region of Quebec, Canada, which elects a member to the National Assembly of Quebec. Its territory corresponds exactly to the city of Granby.

It was created for the 2012 election from part of the former Shefford electoral district.

== Members of the National Assembly ==
Legislature	Years	Member	Party
Riding created from Shefford
40th	2012–2014	François Bonnardel	Coalition Avenir Québec
41st	2014–2018	François Bonnardel	Coalition Avenir Québec
42nd	2018–2022	François Bonnardel	Coalition Avenir Québec
43rd	2022–2026	François Bonnardel	Coalition Avenir Québec
44th	2026–Present	Jean-François Arsenault	Parti Québécois

== Election results ==
2026 Quebec general election
** Preliminary results — Not yet official **
Party	Candidate	Votes	%	±%
Parti Québécois	Jean-François Arsenault	13,171	32.95	+21.11
Coalition Avenir Québec	Claudine Leroux	8,253	20.65	–37.54
Liberal	Claudie Bérubé	7,553	18.89	+14.13
Conservative	Marc-Antoine Huet-Mailly	6,971	17.44	+7.33
Québec solidaire	Méliane St-Amand	3,645	9.12	–5.17
Green	Andrzej Wisniowski	333	0.83	+0.12
Équipe Autonomiste	Jimmy Paquin	48	0.12	+0.02
Total valid votes		39,974	98.10	–0.68
Total rejected ballots		775	1.90	+0.68
Turnout		40,749	68.90	+0.76
Electors on the lists		59,146		
Parti Québécois gain from Coalition Avenir Québec		Swing		+29.33
Source: Élections Québec

2022 Quebec general election
Party	Candidate	Votes	%	±%
Coalition Avenir Québec	François Bonnardel	21,515	58.19	-4.19
Québec solidaire	Anne-Sophie Legault	5,282	14.29	+0.26
Parti Québécois	Guy Bouthillier	4,378	11.84	+2.19
Conservative	Stéphane Bernier	3,737	10.11	+9.12
Liberal	Penny Lamarre	1,758	4.76	-9.27
Green	Andrzej Wisniowski	263	0.71	-0.76
Équipe Autonomiste	Jimmy Paquin	38	0.10	–
Total valid votes		36,971	98.78	–
Total rejected ballots		458	1.22	–
Turnout		37,429	68.14	
Electors on the lists		54,933		

2018 Quebec general election
Party	Candidate	Votes	%	±%
Coalition Avenir Québec	François Bonnardel	22,570	62.38	+9.34
Québec solidaire	Anne-Sophie Legault	5,075	14.03	+9.53
Liberal	Lyne Laverdure	3,881	10.73	-8.45
Parti Québécois	Chantal Beauchemin	3,491	9.65	-12.3
Green	Daphné Poulin	531	1.47	–
Conservative	Pierre Bélanger	358	0.99	–
Parti nul	Stéphane Deschamps	158	0.44	-0.37
Bloc Pot	Kevin Robidas	119	0.33	–
Total valid votes		36,183	98.78	
Total rejected ballots		448	1.22	
Turnout		36,631	69.82	+0.31
Eligible voters		52,468		
Coalition Avenir Québec hold		Swing		-0.095
Source(s) "Rapport des résultats officiels du scrutin". Élections Québec.

2014 Quebec general election
Party	Candidate	Votes	%
Coalition Avenir Québec	François Bonnardel	18,441	53.04
Parti Québécois	Joanne Lalumière	7,630	21.95
Liberal	Pascal Proulx	6,669	19.18
Québec solidaire	André Beauregard	1,565	4.50
Parti nul	Stéphane Deschamps	281	0.81
Option nationale	Jocelyn Beaudoin	179	0.51
Total valid votes		34,765	98.75
Total rejected ballots		440	1.25
Turnout		35,205	69.51
Electors on the lists		50,650	–

2012 Quebec general election
Party	Candidate	Votes	%
Coalition Avenir Québec	François Bonnardel	19,517	52.14
Parti Québécois	Luc Perron	8,502	22.71
Liberal	Guy Gaudord	6,051	16.17
Québec solidaire	Éric Bédard	2,121	5.67
Option nationale	Jocelyn Beaudoin	477	1.27
Conservative	Stéphane Gagné	368	0.98
Parti nul	Stéphane Deschamps	261	0.70
Coalition pour la constituante	Francine St-Onge	135	0.36
Total valid votes		37,432	98.76
Total rejected ballots		471	1.24
Turnout		37,903	76.13
Electors on the lists		49,786	–

== See also ==
- List of Quebec provincial electoral districts
- Canadian provincial electoral districts
