= Government House Leader (Quebec) =

The Government House Leader (French: leader du gouvernement) is a Member of the National Assembly (MNA, député(e)) chosen by the Premier of Quebec to be in charge of strategy and procedure for the group of Members who support the government in the Assembly.

The role of Government House Leader is now codified in the Standing Orders of the National Assembly.

Two other MNAs are Deputy Government House Leader (leader adjoint du gouvernement). They assist the Government House Leader and replace him when required.

== List ==
List of Government House Leaders:

Government House Leader	From	Until	Legislature	Premier
Pierre Laporte	January 21, 1965	April 18, 1966	27th	Lesage
Maurice Bellemare	1966	1969	28th	D. Johnson
Rémi Paul	February 26, 1969	1970	28th	Bertrand
Pierre Laporte	May 12, 1970	October 17, 1970	29th	Bourassa
Gérard D. Levesque	1970	1976	29th, 30th	Bourassa
Robert Burns	December 14, 1976	October 3, 1978	31st	Lévesque
Claude Charron	October 3, 1978	February 23, 1982	31st, 32nd	Lévesque
Jean-François Bertrand	February 23, 1982	March 5, 1984	32nd	Lévesque
Marc-André Bédard	March 5, 1984	October 23, 1985	32nd	P.-M. Johnson
Michel Gratton	December 16, 1985	August 9, 1989	33rd	Bourassa
Michel Pagé	October 11, 1989	October 29, 1992	34th	Bourassa
Pierre Paradis	November 12, 1992	September 26, 1994	34th	Bourassa
Guy Chevrette	September 26, 1994	January 29, 1996	35th	Parizeau
Pierre Bélanger	January 29, 1996	August 25, 1997	35th	Bouchard
Jean-Pierre Jolivet	August 25, 1997	September 23, 1998	35th	Bouchard
Jacques Brassard	September 23, 1998	January 29, 2002	35th, 36th	Bouchard
André Boisclair	January 30, 2002	April 14, 2003	36th	Landry
Jacques P. Dupuis	April 29, 2003	February 21, 2007	37th	Charest
Jean-Marc Fournier	April 18, 2007	November 5, 2008	38th	Charest
Jacques P. Dupuis	December 18, 2008	August 9, 2010	39th	Charest
Jean-Marc Fournier	September 20, 2010	August 1, 2012	39th	Charest
Stéphane Bédard	September 19, 2012	April 26, 2014	40th	Marois
Jean-Marc Fournier	April 26, 2014	October 18, 2018	41st	Couillard
Simon Jolin-Barrette	October 18, 2018	April 21, 2026	42nd, 43rd	Legault
François Bonnardel	April 21, 2026	August 27, 2026	43rd	Fréchette
Catherine Gentilcore	October 21, 2026		44th	Plamondon

== See also ==
- Politics of Quebec
