= Marois ministry =

Former Cabinet of Quebec

- 30th ministry of Quebec
- 2012–2014
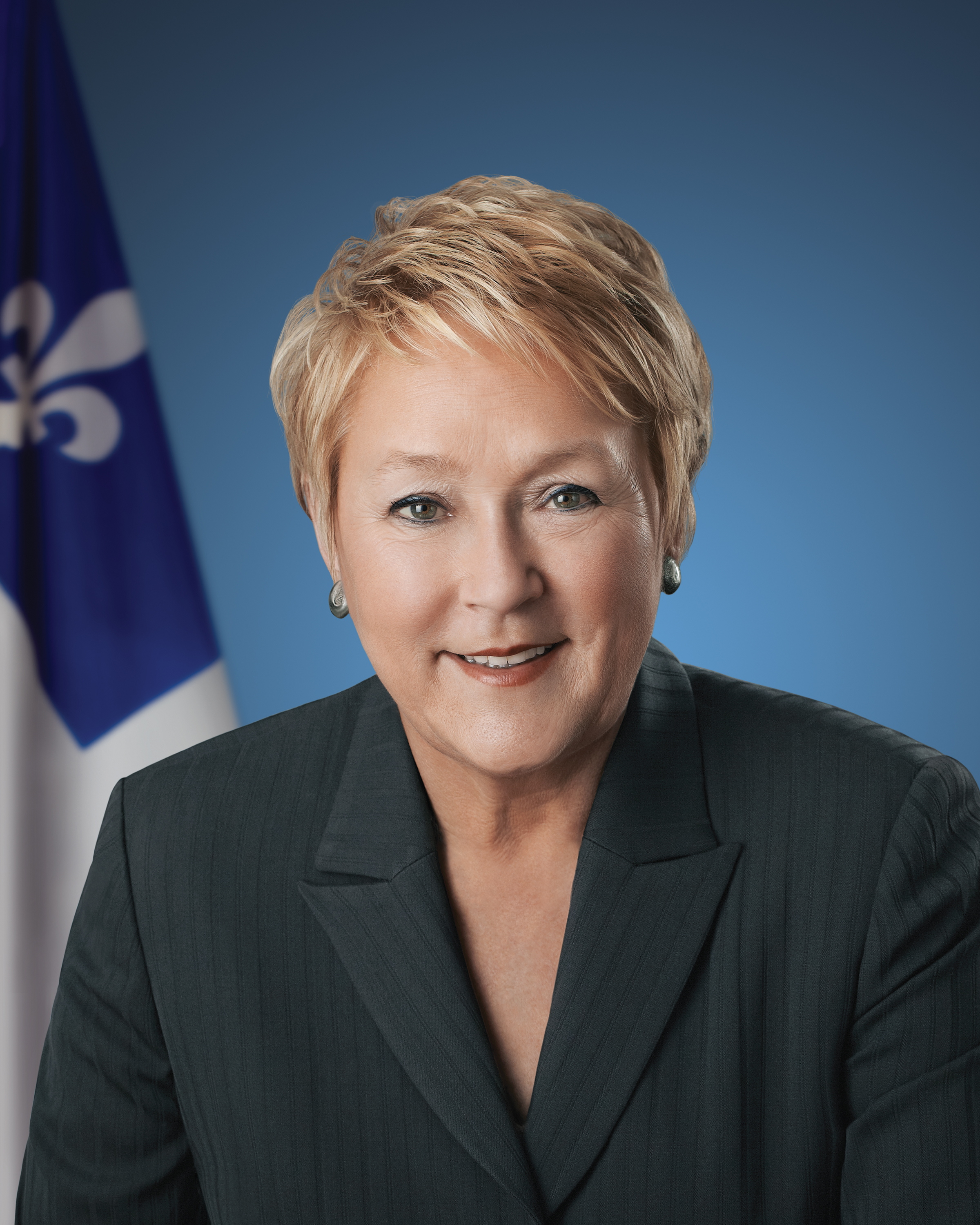
- Date formed: September 19, 2012
- Date dissolved: April 23, 2014

People and organisations
- Monarch: Elizabeth II
- Lieutenant governor: Pierre Duchesne
- Premier: Pauline Marois
- Deputy Premier: François Gendron
- Member party: Parti Québécois
- Status in legislature: Minority
- Opposition party: Liberal
- Opposition leader: Jean-Marc Fournier (2012–2013); Philippe Couillard (2013–2014)

History
- Election: 2012
- Legislature term: 40th Quebec Legislature
- Predecessor: Charest ministry
- Successor: Couillard ministry

The Marois ministry was the Cabinet formed by Quebec Premier Pauline Marois and held power from September 2012 until April 2014. The administration of the Parti Quebecois was officially formed on September 19, 2012, after the 2012 Quebec general election. This election brought 54 MNAs to the National Assembly of Quebec. As these MNAs did not occupy more than half of the seats, the government formed was a minority. The administration was defeated during the general election on April 7, 2014.

== Characteristics ==
The first cabinet of Pauline Marois consisted of 24 ministers - including the premier - of which 9 were women and 15 were men. The Chief Whip and the President of the caucus also participate in the Executive Council.

Political analysts in Quebec have, for the most part, identified that the minority government of the Parti Quebecois underwent two important stages. The first year in power was difficult for the party. Certain governmental actions were perceived incoherently by the populace, causing a drop in approval rating. Afterwards, however, the government improved in regards to public acceptance, a trend that began to appear halfway through 2013. The true turning point for Marois was the Lac-Mégantic derailment, in July 2013, which debuted the refocusing of governmental actions.^{1}

Political scientist Jean-Herman Guay notes that this change in approach occurred in unison with a swing towards the center of the political spectrum. This alteration was associated with two budgets that controlled spending and raised certain prices. The recovery of the government also ameliorated with the tabling of the Charter of Values; hereafter, the government began to stand on its own two feet. "[The party] cornered the CAQ, which proposed a compromise, was not prepared for a political debate meant to destabilize the PQ", said political journalist Alec Castonguay in an article published at the beginning of the electoral campaign.^{1}

== Timeline ==
=== 2012 ===
- September 19: Pauline Marois announces her cabinet and officials.^{2}
- September 20: Pauline Marois announces the closure of the Gentilly 2 nuclear plant.^{3}
- September 21: The government officially cancels the major section of Bill 78.^{4}
- October 30: The first session of the legislature begins.

=== 2013 ===
- February 25 & 26: The Superior Teaching Standards Summit takes place in Montreal.
- June 12: Bill 52, on palliative care, is tabled.
- September 10: The government publicizes the proposition of a Charter of Values.
- October 7: The unveiling of the Priorité emploi plan, meant to revive the economy.
- October 10: The unveiling of the industrial policy of the Marois Administration.

=== 2014 ===
- January 14: The beginning of parliamentary commission on the Charter of Québécois Values.
- March 5: Pauline Marois calls an election before the end of her mandate.

== Government composition ==
=== Composition as of September 2012 ===
- François Gendron: Deputy Premier, Minister of Food, Agriculture and Fisheries and Minister for Abitibi-Témiscamingue.
- Stéphane Bédard: Government House Leader, Minister responsible for government administration, president of the Treasury Board and minister responsible for Saguenay-Lac-Saint-Jean.
- Nicolas Marceau: Minister of Finance and president of the Regional economic diversity committee.
- Agnès Maltais: Minister of Labour, Employment and Solidarity, Minister of the Status or Women, President of the Solidarity Committee and Minister responsible for Capitale-Nationale and for Chaudière-Appalaches.
- Bernard Drainville: Minister of Democratic Institutions and Citizen Participation, president of the Identity Committee and Minister responsible for Mauricie.
- Bertrand St-Arnaud: Minister of Justice and President of Legislation.
- Nicole Léger: Minister of the Family and Minister responsible for Laval and the Laurentians.
- Marie Malavoy: Minister of Education, Leisure and Sport and Minister responsible for Montérégie.
- Jean-François Lisée: Minister of International Relations, Francophonie and International commerce, President of the Metropolitan Committee and Minister responsible for Montreal.
- Sylvain Gaudreault: Minister of Transport, Minister of Municipal Affairs.
- Martine Ouellet: Minister of Natural Resources.
- Alexandre Cloutier: Minister of Canadian Intergovernmental Affairs, Minister of Sovereigntist Governance and Minister responsible for Côte-Nord and Nord-du-Québec.
- Réjean Hébert: Minister of Health and Social Services, Minister responsible for Seniors and Minister responsible for Estrie.
- Véronique Hivon: Minister for Public Health, Youth Protection and Minister responsible for Lanaudière.
- Maka Kotto: Minister of Culture and Communications.
- Stéphane Bergeron: Minister of Public Security and Minister responsible for Outaouais.
- Pierre Duchesne: Minister for High Education, Research, Science and Technology and Minister responsible for Centre-du-Québec.
- Diane De Courcy: Minister of Immigration and Culture and Minister responsible for the Charter of the French Language.
- Daniel Breton: Minister of Sustainable Development, the Environment, Wildlife and Natural Parks.^{5}
- Pascal Bérubé: Minister of Tourism and Minister responsible for Bas-Saint-Laurent.
- Élaine Zakaïb: Minister of Industry and of the Bank of Economic Development of Quebec.
- Gaétan Lelièvre: Minister of Regions and Minister responsible for Gaspésie-Îles-de-la-Madeleine.
- Elizabeth Larouche: Minister of Aboriginal Affairs
- Léo Bureau-Blouin: Parliamentary assistant for the premier.

=== Reform in the cabinet as of September 21, 2012 ===
- Pierre Duchesne relinquishes his responsibility for Centre-du-Quebec. Yves-Francois Blanchet assists, but he is not admitted to the Executive Council.^{6}
- Bernard Drainville relinquishes his responsibility for Mauricie. This post is also occupied Yves-Francois Blanchet.

=== Reform in the cabinet as of October 18, 2012 ===
- Veronique Hivon resigns for health reasons.^{7}
- Nicolas Marceau therefore becomes Minister responsible for Lanaudiere.^{7}

=== Reform in the cabinet as of December 4, 2012 ===
- Yves-Francois Blanchet becomes Minister for the Environment and officially becomes the Minister responsible for Centre-du-Quebec and Mauricie.
- Veronique Hivon reprises her role as Minister of Social Services and Youth Protection and the Minister responsible for Lanaudiere.^{8}
- Marjolain Dufour becomes Chief Whip and Minister responsible for Côte-Nord.^{8}
- Sylvain Pagé becomes president of the caucus and becomes Minister responsible for the Laurentians.^{8}

== See also ==
- Legault ministry
