= Ministry of the Environment and the Fight Against Climate Change =

The Ministry of the Environment, the Fight Against Climate Change, Biodiversity Protection, Wildlife and Parks (French: Ministère de l’Environnement, de la Lutte contre les changements climatiques, de la Protection de la biodiversité, de la Faune et des Parcs; MELCCFP) is a government department of Quebec responsible for environmental protection, climate change policy, biodiversity conservation, wildlife management and provincial parks. It also coordinates the implementation of the Quebec government's sustainable development policy across government departments and public bodies.

The minister is Jean Pellerin, who was appointed on October 21, 2026. He also serves as minister responsible for the Mauricie region. ble for implementation of the provincial government's sustainable development plan, of which all provincial government agencies and organizations are party.
