= Ministry of Families =

Minister of Families (French: Ministère de la Famille) of Quebec is responsible for families and seniors in the province.

Since 2026, Catherine Blouin has served as minister.
