= Manon Jeannotte =

Lieutenant Governor of Quebec since 2024

Her Honour the Honourable Manon Jeannotte

30th Lieutenant Governor of Quebec
- Incumbent
- Assumed office January 25, 2024
- Monarch: Charles III
- Governors General: Mary Simon; Louise Arbour
- Premier: François Legault; Christine Fréchette; Paul St-Pierre Plamondon
- Preceded by: J. Michel Doyon

Personal details
- Born: 1970 (age 55–56)
- Education: McGill University

Manon Jeannotte (French pronunciation: [manɔ̃ ʒanɔt]; born 1970) is a Canadian civil servant who serves as the 30th lieutenant governor of Quebec. She assumed the role on January 25, 2024, choosing to be sworn in at her office rather than in the National Assembly of Quebec as is customary.

Jeannotte is a member of the Mi'kmaq First Nation. Following her appointment by the Governor General of Canada, the National Assembly of Quebec unanimously voted a non-binding motion to abolish the position of lieutenant governor, although it specified the motion was not a consequence of Jeannotte's appointment but rather a criticism of the Crown.

== Education ==
Jeannotte holds an EMBA from McGill University and HEC Montreal. She is a Certified Corporate Director (CCD) from Université Laval and has also completed a post-graduate microprogramme in interculturalism in Quebec at Université de Sherbrooke.

== Career ==
Prior to her appointment as 30th Lieutenant Governor of Quebec, Jeannotte was Director of the First Nations Executive Education at HEC Montréal, which she also co-initiated.

Jeannotte has made her mark with the Micmac Nation of Gespeg, first as a councillor from 2003 to 2008, then from 2011 to 2015, before taking on the role of Chief from 2015 to 2019.

Early in her career, she had the opportunity to write a memoir on the presence of the Mi'gma in the Gaspé region for submission to the Historic Sites and Monuments Board of Canada. She was then recruited through a pan-Canadian competition as an Aboriginal trainee analyst at Statistics Canada.

== Engagement ==
Jeannotte has also been actively involved in a number of organisations and has sat on several boards of directors:

- Member of Statistics Canada's Aboriginal Advisory Circle, 2001–2002
- Member of the Board of Directors of the first federal Crown corporation, the First Nations Statistical Institute, where she chaired the Human Resources and Policy Committee, 2007–2013
- Member of the ad-hoc committee of Art-Culture autochtone de Montréal, 2011–2012 and 2015
- Member of the Board of Directors of Terres en Vues, 2012–2023
- Member of the Board of Directors of "La Relance Fort Prevel", 2015–2016
- Member of the strategic committee of Chemins de transition UDM and Espace pour la vie, 2021–2022
- Member of the CNC-QC Board of Directors, 2023

== Honours ==
Jeannotte was named the most outstanding student in the McGill-HEC Montréal EMBA programme by ROB Magazine in 2017.

She also received a certificate of recognition from the Quebec Council of Senior Federal Officials for her contribution to the partnership for the "Commemoration of First Nations and Inuit History in Quebec".

She is a recipient of the King Charles III Coronation Medal (Canada).

Order of precedence
Preceded by Edith Dumont as Lieutenant Governor of Ontario	Order of Precedence of Canada as Lieutenant Governor of Quebec	Succeeded by Mike Savage as Lieutenant Governor of Nova Scotia
