= Ministry of Public Security (Quebec) =

The Ministry of Interior Security (French: Ministère de la Sécurité intérieure) is responsible for public safety and security in the province of Quebec. The ministry is in charge of the Sûreté du Québec, the provincial police force.

Since 2026 the minister is Guy Lapointe Jr..

== Ministers of Public Security ==
- Herbert Marx 1988
- Gil Rémillard 1988–1989
- Sam Elkas 1989–1990
- Claude Ryan 1990–1994
- Robert Middlemiss 1994
- Serge Ménard 1994–1996
- Robert Perreault 1996–1997
- Pierre Bélanger 1997–1998
- Serge Ménard 1998–2003
- Normand Jutras 2002
- Jacques Chagnon 2003–2005
- Jacques P. Dupuis 2005–2010
- Robert Dutil 2010–2012
- Stéphane Bergeron 2012–2014
- Lise Thériault 2014–2016
- Martin Coiteux 2016–2018
- Geneviève Guilbault 2018–2022
- François Bonnardel 2022–2025
- Ian Lafrenière 2025–2026
- Guy Lapointe Jr. 2026–present

== Solicitors General of Quebec ==
Prior to 2002, the ministry was under the Solicitor General (solliciteur général):

- George Irvine 1867–1873
- Joseph-Adolphe Chapleau 1873–1874
- Auguste-Real Angers 1874–1876
- George Barnard Baker 1876–1878
- Alexandre Chauveau 1878–1879
- Honoré Mercier 1879
- William Warren Lynch 1879–1881
- Edmund James Flynn 1884–1887
- Georges Duhamel 1887–1890
- Antoine Rivard 1950–1959
- Jacques Miquelon 1959–1960
- Claude Wagner 1964–1966
- Roy Fournier 1971–1972
- Fernand Lalonde 1975–1976
- Marc-André Bédard 1985
- Gerard Latulippe 1985–1987
- Herbert Marx 1987–1988

== Provincial prisons in Quebec ==
- Centre de détention de Montréal (Prison Bordeaux) - Montréal, Quebec
- Centre de détention Tanguay (Maison Tanguay) - Montréal, Quebec
- Centre de détention de Rivière-des-Prairies - Rivière-des-Prairies, Quebec
- Centre de détention de Saint-Jérôme - Saint-Jérôme, Quebec
- Centre de détention de Québec - Québec, Quebec
- Quartier cellulaire du Palais de Justice - Longueuil, Quebec
- Palais de Justice de Montréal - Montréal, Quebec
- Centre de détention de Laval - Laval, Quebec
- Centre de détention de Amos - Amos, Quebec
- Centre de détention de Baie-Comeau - Baie-Comeau, Quebec
- Centre de détention de Chicoutimi - Saguenay, Quebec
- Centre de détention de Havre-Aubert - Îles-de-la-Madeleine, Quebec
- Centre de détention de Hull - Gatineau, Quebec
- Centre de détention de New-Carlisle - New Carlisle, Quebec
- Centre de détention de Rimouski - Rimouski, Quebec
- Centre de détention de Percé - Percé, Quebec
- Centre de détention de Roberval - Roberval, Quebec
- Centre de détention de Sept-Îles - Sept-Îles, Quebec
- Centre de détention de Sherbrooke - Sherbrooke, Quebec
- Centre de détention de Sorel - Sorel-Tracy, Quebec
- Centre de détention de Trois-Rivières - Trois-Rivières, Quebec
- Centre de détention de Valleyfield - Valleyfield, Quebec
