= Ministry of Municipal Affairs and Housing (Quebec) =

Quebec government ministry

The Ministry of Municipal Affairs and Housing (French: Ministère des Affaires municipales et de l'Habitation, abbr. MAMH) is a government ministry in the Canadian province of Quebec. It works with municipalities and other local and regional organizations to support municipal administration, local development, land-use planning and municipal autonomy.

The ministry's responsibilities are divided politically between the Minister of Municipal Affairs and the minister responsible for housing. As of October 2026, Nicolas Girard serves as Minister of Municipal Affairs, while Elsie Lefebvre is responsible for housing. Girard also serves as Minister of Transport and Sustainable Mobility, and Lefebvre as Minister of Higher Education.

The ministry's mandate includes municipal governance, municipal finance and infrastructure, and land-use planning. It works with local municipalities, regional county municipalities, metropolitan communities and other regional organizations to support local and regional development. Its administrative structure includes regional operations serving Quebec's 17 administrative regions.

Housing policy is overseen by the minister responsible for housing, working with the Société d'habitation du Québec, which administers housing programs and supports social and affordable housing. The Commission municipale du Québec falls under the responsibility of the Minister of Municipal Affairs.

== Mandate of Municipal Affairs ==
The ministry acts as a partner to local municipalities, regional county municipalities (RCMs), metropolitan communities, other categories of territorial entities, and associations representing Quebec municipalities. Its mandate is to support municipal administration, promote municipal autonomy, and encourage sustainable land-use planning, local development and regional development throughout Quebec.

Its responsibilities include municipal governance, municipal finance and infrastructure, land-use planning, and regional development. Its territorial administration includes regional operations serving Quebec's 17 administrative regions, as well as specific structures for the Montreal metropolitan region and the Capitale-Nationale region.

== Mandate of Housing ==
The Minister responsible for Housing oversees housing policy and works with the Société d'habitation du Québec (SHQ), which implements housing programs and supports the development and preservation of social and affordable housing in Quebec.

== Commission municipale du Québec ==
The Commission municipale du Québec falls under the responsibility of the Minister of Municipal Affairs.

== Attached agencies of Housing ==
The following agencies fall under the responsibility of the Minister responsible for Housing:

- the Société d'habitation du Québec, which develops and administers housing programs and provides support for social and affordable housing; and
- the Tribunal administratif du logement, which has jurisdiction over disputes relating to residential leases.
