= Ministry of Immigration, Francisation and Integration =

Canadian provincial government ministry

- Ministère de l'Immigration, de la Francisation et de l'Intégration
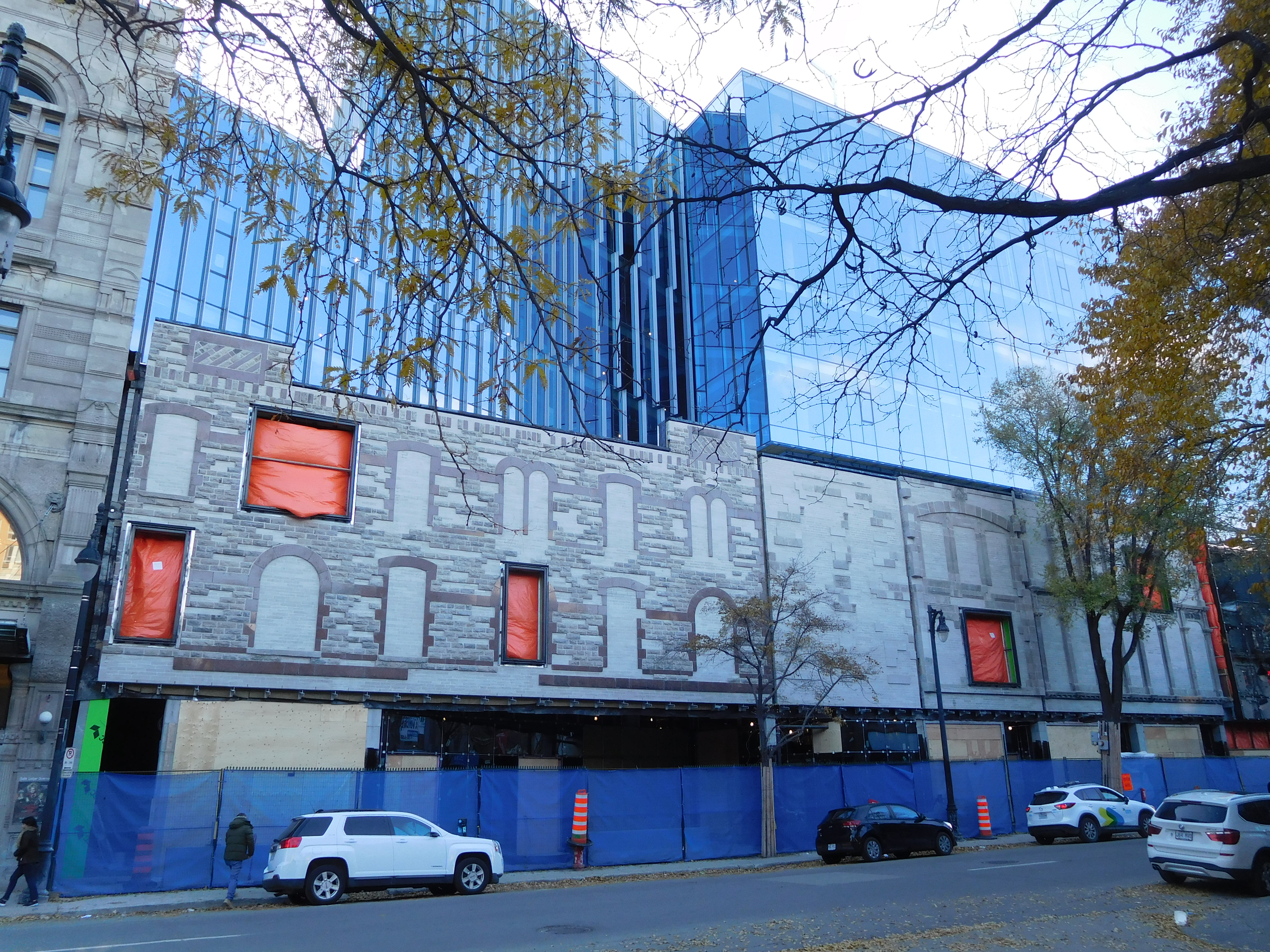

Agency overview
- Formed: 5 November 1968
- Jurisdiction: Government of Quebec
- Minister responsible: François Bonnardel
- Key document: Canada–Québec Accord relating to Immigration and Temporary Admission of Aliens
- Website: Official website

The Ministry of Immigration, Francisation and Integration (French: Ministère de l'Immigration, de la Francisation et de l'Intégration) is a government department in Quebec responsible for immigration, francisation, and integration in the province. Accordingly, it provides a variety of programs for immigrants and immigrant communities in the province.

Jurisdiction in matters of immigration in Quebec is shared with the Canadian government, in accordance to the Constitution Act, 1867 (article 95) and the 1991 Canada–Québec Accord relating to Immigration and Temporary Admission of Aliens. The federal government pays financial compensation to Quebec in order to ensure the reception and integration of immigrants.

The department was previously known as the Ministry of Immigration, Diversity, and Inclusion (Ministère de l’Immigration, de la Diversité et de l’Inclusion).

== History ==
The ministry was founded on 5 November 1968, a decision made by then Premier Jean-Jacques Bertrand. The reasons for the creation of the ministry were: to prevent French from losing its dominant position in Quebec society as the birth rate of French Canadians fell, and to attract immigrants from the French-speaking world to Quebec. At its beginnings, the ministry opened immigration offices only in France and Italy. It also established a network of seven language orientation and training centres, whose goal was to teach French to newcomers. The department was previously overseen by the Minister of Immigration and Cultural Communities as a member of the Executive Council of Quebec.

On 20 February 1978, Canada and Quebec signed an immigration agreement giving Quebec decision-making power to choose its independent immigrants, who would then have to be approved by Ottawa.

On 5 February 1991, the Canada–Québec Accord relating to Immigration and Temporary Admission of Aliens was concluded, giving Quebec more power in the selection of immigrants by offering federal transfers of funds for integration of these, and guaranteeing Quebec an immigration rate proportional to its demographic weight in Canada.

=== Proposed reform ===
During the 2022 Quebec general election, the Coalition Avenir Québec (CAQ) government of François Legault campaigned on getting more immigration powers from the federal government to Quebec. Legault has raised the idea of having a referendum on immigration powers, a pledge that was repeated after the party has increased its majority.

== Program suspensions and criticism ==
Since 2024 the Ministry has been the subject of criticism due to a series of suspensions and closures of immigration programs and changes to selection rules. On 31 October 2024 the government paused the intake of new applications under the Quebec experience program (Programme de l’expérience québécoise, PEQ) for people who had obtained diplomas in Quebec, and also stopped accepting applications under the regular skilled worker program (Programme régulier des travailleurs qualifiés, PRTQ) and the skilled worker selection program (Programme de sélection des travailleurs qualifiés, PSTQ), with a suspension implemented as of 30 June 2025. Quebec's immigration levels plan for 2025 indicates that this pause will considerably reduce the number of Quebec selection certificates (certificats de sélection du Québec, CSQ) issued through PEQ graduates compared with earlier projections.

On 5 June 2025 the Ministry also suspended the PEQ stream for temporary foreign workers and extended the existing pause on Quebec graduates, keeping both on hold until 30 November 2025. In November 2025 the government announced the definitive closure of both PEQ streams as of 19 November 2025, and confirmed that skilled workers would henceforth have to apply for a temporary work visa through the PSTQ via the Arrima system. Various immigration experts argued that all of these suspensions and the definitive end of the PEQ quickly closed off pathways to permanent residence.

Student organisations and networks in the education sector expressed concern that the suspension of the PEQ limits the expectations of international students and graduates who had planned their studies and careers around that program. Éducation internationale warned in October 2024 that the suspension of the PEQ for foreign students who had graduated in Quebec jeopardised the future of many young people who had chosen Quebec with the intention of settling there after completing their studies. In 2025 the student association AELIÉS at Université Laval stated that the elimination of the PEQ removed an essential tool for the professional integration of foreign students trained in Quebec and broke the promise made to those who had chosen the province to build a long-term life project. Media coverage of the November 2025 protests reported that some temporary workers and international graduates viewed the abolition of the PEQ as treating them as "disposable labour" and criticised the speed with which the policies were changed. Various advocacy groups have argued that these measures reflect an immigration approach focused mainly on numerical targets rather than the lives behind those numbers, without giving sufficient weight to rights, family life and migrants' ability to plan their long-term projects.

The Ministry has also been criticised for temporarily freezing family reunification. In 2025 the government confirmed that the intake of new sponsorship applications for parents, grandparents and other relatives under Quebec's family reunification program would remain closed from 26 June 2024 until 25 June 2026, once the quota set for the period had been reached. At the same time, another suspension of new sponsorship applications for spouses and adult children was announced until June 2026, a measure that immigration lawyers described as troubling for families already living in the province. Critics argue that these freezes undermine confidence in the stability of family reunification rules and add pressure on residents whose plans depend on sponsoring close relatives.

Another focus of debate has been the management of the list of occupations eligible for simplified processing of temporary foreign workers. In 2025 Quebec introduced a new list for the facilitated Labour Market Impact Assessment (LMIA) process, reducing the number of eligible occupations from more than 267 in 2024 to 76 and explicitly linking the change to objectives to reduce the number of temporary residents. Business organisations and chambers of commerce have said that the reduction removed numerous occupations from the facilitated process and warned that the combination of narrower lists and sudden program suspensions complicates workforce planning for companies that depend on foreign workers. Taken together, these changes have led trade unions, student associations, civil society organisations and immigration professionals to call on the government to review its approach in order to provide more predictable rules and maintain confidence in Quebec's immigration institutions.

=== Laws and regulations ===
The Minister of Immigration, Francization and Integration is responsible with administering the following laws and regulations in relation to Quebec immigration:

- Act respecting the Ministère de l'Immigration, de la Diversité et de l'Inclusion (chapter M-16.1)
  - Terms and conditions of the signing of certain deeds, documents and writings of the Ministère de l’Immigration et des Communautés culturelles (r. 2)
- Québec Immigration Act (chapter I-0.2.1)
  - Regulation respecting immigration consultants (r. 1)
  - Québec Immigration Regulation (r. 3)

== See also ==
- Immigration to Canada
- Canada-Quebec Accord
- Official website
