= 5th Quebec Legislature =

The 5th Legislative Assembly of Quebec was the provincial legislature in Quebec, Canada that existed from December 2, 1881, to October 14, 1886. The Quebec Conservative Party led Joseph-Adolphe Chapleau, Joseph-Alfred Mousseau and John Jones Ross was the governing party. Chapleau was succeeded by Mousseau in 1882 while Ross succeeded Mousseau in 1884. It was the Conservatives last majority government.

The sixty-five members were each elected in a single-member district through First past the post.

== Seats per political party ==
- After the 1881 elections

Affiliation	Members
Conservative	50
Liberal/Parti national	14
Conservative Independent	1
Total	65
Government Majority	36

== Member list ==
This was the list of members of the Legislative Assembly of Quebec that were elected in the 1881 election:

Name	Party	Riding	First elected / previously elected	No. of terms
William Owens	Conservative	Argenteuil	1881	1st term
Antoine Casavant	Conservative	Bagot	1881	1st term
Jean Blanchet	Conservative	Beauce	1881	1st term
Célestin Bergevin	Conservative	Beauharnois	1867, 1878	3rd term*
Édouard Faucher de Saint-Maurice	Conservative	Bellechasse	1881	1st term
Joseph Robillard	Conservative	Berthier	1878	2nd term
Louis-Joseph Riopel	Conservative	Bonaventure	1881	1st term
Henri-Josué Martin (1882)	Conservative	Bonaventure	1882	1st term
William Warren Lynch	Conservative	Brome	1871	4th term
Michel-Dosithée-Stanislas Martel	Conservative	Chambly	1878, 1881	2nd term*
Robert Trudel	Conservative	Champlain	1881	1st term
Onésime Gauthier	Conservative	Charlevoix	1875	3rd term
Édouard Laberge	Liberal	Châteauguay	1867	5th term
Joseph-Émery Robidoux (1884)	Liberal	Châteauguay	1884	1st term
Élie Saint-Hilaire	Conservative Independent	Chicoutimi et Saguenay	1881	1st term
William Sawyer	Conservative	Compton	1871	4th term
Charles Champagne	Conservative	Deux-Montagnes	1876	3rd term
Benjamin Beauchamp (1882)	Conservative	Deux-Montagnes	1882	1st term
Nicodème Audet	Conservative	Dorchester	1878	2nd term
William John Watts	Liberal	Drummond et Arthabaska	1874	4th term
Joseph-Éna Girouard (1886)	Liberal	Drummond et Arthabaska	1886	1st term
Edmund James Flynn	Conservative (Note: First Elected as a Liberal)	Gaspé	1878	2nd term
Louis Beaubien	Conservative	Hochelaga	1867	5th term
Alexander Cameron	Liberal	Huntingdon	1874	4th term
Alexis-Louis Demers	Liberal	Iberville	1881	1st term
Charles Marcotte	Conservative	Islet	1881	1st term
Narcisse Lecavalier	Conservative	Jacques Cartier	1867	5th term
Joseph-Alfred Mousseau (1882)	Conservative	Jacques Cartier	1882	1st term
Arthur Boyer (1884)	Liberal	Jacques Cartier	1884	1st term
Vincent-Paul Lavallée	Conservative	Joliette	1867	5th term
Alfred McConville (1885)	Conservative	Joliette	1885	1st term
Charles-Antoine-Ernest Gagnon	Liberal	Kamouraska	1878	2nd term
Léon-Benoît-Alfred Charlebois	Conservative	Laprairie	1875	3rd term
Joseph Marion	Conservative	L'Assomption	1880	2nd term
Louis-Onésime Loranger	Conservative	Laval	1875	3rd term
Pierre-Évariste Leblanc (1882)	Conservative	Laval	1882	1st term
Amédée Gaboury (1883)	Liberal	Laval	1883	1st term
Pierre-Évariste Leblanc (1884)	Conservative	Laval	1882, 1884	2nd term*
Étienne-Théodore Pâquet	Conservative	Lévis	1875	3rd term
François-Xavier Lemieux (1883)	Liberal	Lévis	1883	1st term
Henri-Gustave Joly de Lotbinière	Liberal	Lotbinière	1867	5th term
Édouard-Hippolyte Laliberté (1886)	Liberal	Lotbinière	1886	1st term
Édouard Caron	Conservative	Maskinongé	1878	2nd term
George Irvine	Liberal	Mégantic	1867, 1878	5th term*
John Whyte (1884)	Liberal	Mégantic	1884	1st term
Elijah Edmund Spencer	Conservative	Missisquoi	1881	1st term
Jean-Baptiste-Trefflé Richard	Conservative	Montcalm	1881	1st term
Louis-Napoléon Fortin	Liberal	Montmagny	1876	3rd term
Nazaire Bernatchez (1883)	Independent Liberal	Montmagny	1883	1st term
Louis-Georges Desjardins	Conservative	Montmorency	1881	1st term
George Washington Stephens Sr.	Liberal	Montréal Centre	1881	1st term
Louis-Olivier Taillon	Conservative	Montréal Est	1875	3rd term
James McShane	Liberal	Montreal Ouest	1878	2nd term
François-Xavier Paradis	Conservative	Napierville	1881	1st term
Charles-Édouard Houde	Conservative	Nicolet	1876	3rd term
Louis-Trefflé Dorais (1883)	Independent Conservative	Nicolet	1883	1st term
Louis Duhamel	Conservative	Ottawa (Outaouais)	1875	3rd term
Thomas Bryson	Conservative	Pontiac	1881	1st term
William Joseph Poupore (1882)	Conservative	Pontiac	1882	1st term
Jean-Docile Brousseau	Conservative	Portneuf	1881	1st term
Pierre Garneau	Conservative	Québec-Comté	1873, 1881	3rd term*
Rémi-Ferdinand Rinfret dit Malouin	Liberal	Québec-Centre	1874	4th term
Joseph Shehyn	Liberal	Québec-Est	1875	3rd term
Félix Carbray	Conservative	Québec-Ouest	1881	1st term
Léon Leduc	Conservative	Richelieu	1881	1st term
Jacques Picard	Conservative	Richmond et Wolfe	1867	5th term
Louis-Napoléon Asselin	Conservative	Rimouski	1881	1st term
Étienne Poulin	Conservative	Rouville	1881	1st term
Honoré Mercier	Liberal	St. Hyacinthe	1879	2nd term
Félix-Gabriel Marchand	Liberal	St. Jean	1867	5th term
François-Sévère Desaulniers	Conservative	St. Maurice	1878	2nd term
Isidore Frégeau	Conservative	Shefford	1881	1st term
Joseph Gibb Robertson	Conservative	Sherbrooke	1867	5th term
William Duckett	Conservative	Soulanges	1878	2nd term
John Thornton	Conservative	Stanstead	1875, 1881	2nd term*
Georges-Honoré Deschênes	Conservative	Témiscouata	1875	3rd term
Joseph-Adolphe Chapleau	Conservative	Terrebonne	1867	5th term
Guillaume-Alphonse Nantel (1882)	Conservative	Terrebonne	1882	1st term
Sévère Dumoulin	Conservative	Trois-Rivières	1868, 1881	2nd term*
Henri-René-Arthur Turcotte (1886)	Independent Conservative	Trois-Rivières	1876, 1886	3rd term*
Émery Lalonde, Sr.	Conservative	Vaudreuil	1871	4th term
François-Xavier Archambault (1882)	Conservative	Vaudreuil	1882	1st term
Alfred Lapointe (1884)	Conservative	Vaudreuil	1884	1st term
Abraham Bernard	Liberal	Verchères	1881	1st term
Jonathan Saxton Campbell Würtele	Conservative	Yamaska	1875	3rd term

== Other elected MLAs ==
Other MLAs were elected in by-elections during the term

- William Joseph Poupore, Quebec Conservative Party, Pontiac, March 6, 1882
- Guillaume-Alphonse Nantel, Quebec Conservative Party, Terrebonne, August 19, 1882
- Joseph-Alfred Mousseau, Quebec Conservative Party, Jacques Cartier, August 26, 1882
- Benjamin Beauchamp, Quebec Conservative Party, Deux-Montagnes, October 21, 1882
- Pierre-Évariste Leblanc, Quebec Conservative Party, Laval, October 30, 1882 & July 14, 1884
- François-Xavier Archambault, Quebec Conservative Party, Vaudreuil, October 30, 1882
- Henri-Josué Martin, Quebec Conservative Party, Bonaventure, October 31, 1882
- Louis-Trefflé Dorais, Conservative Independent, Nicolet, February 5, 1883
- Amédée Gaboury, Quebec Liberal Party, Laval, June 13, 1883
- François-Xavier Lemieux, Quebec Liberal Party, Lévis, November 16, 1883
- Joseph-Émery Robidoux, Quebec Liberal Party, Châteauguay, March 26, 1884
- Arthur Boyer, Quebec Liberal Party, Jacques Cartier, March 26, 1884
- Henri-René-Arthur Turcotte, Conservative Independent, Trois-Rivières, March 26, 1884
- Alfred Lapointe, Quebec Conservative Party, Vaudreuil, June 19, 1884
- John Whyte, Quebec Liberal Party, Mégantic, October 29, 1884
- Alfred McConville, Quebec Conservative Party, Joliette, September 25, 1885
- Édouard-Hippolyte Laliberté, Quebec Liberal Party, Lotbinière, January 30, 1886
- Joseph-Éna Girouard, Quebec Liberal Party, Drummond et Arthabaska, March 24, 1886

== Cabinet Ministers ==
=== Chapleau Cabinet (1881–1882) ===
- Prime Minister and Executive Council President: Joseph-Adolphe Chapleau
- Agriculture and public works: John Jones Ross (1881–1882), Elisée Dionne (1882)
- Crown Lands: Edmund James Flynn
- Railroad: John Jones Ross (1881–1882), William Warren Lych (1882)
- Attorney General: Louis-Onésime Loranger
- Secretary and Registry: Etienne-Théodore Pâquet
- Treasurer: Joseph Gibb Robertson (1881–1882), Jonathan Saxton Campbell Wurtele (1882)
- Solicitor General: William Warren Lynch
- Legislative Council President: John Jones Ross

=== Mousseau Cabinet (1882–1884) ===
- Prime Minister and Executive Council President: Joseph-Alfred Mousseau
- Agriculture and public works: Elisée Dionne
- Crown Lands: William Warren Lynch
- Railroad: Henry Starnes
- Attorney General: Joseph-Alfred Mousseau
- Secretary and Registry: Jean Blanchet
- Treasurer: Jonathan Saxton Campbell Wurtele

=== Ross Cabinet (1884–1886) ===
- Prime Minister and Executive Council President: John Jones Ross
- Agriculture and public works: John Jones Ross
- Crown Lands: William Warren Lynch
- Railroad: Edmund James Flynn
- Attorney General: Louis-Olivier Taillon
- Secretary and Registry: Jean Blanchet
- Treasurer: Joseph Gibb Robertson
- Solicitor General: Edmund James Flynn (1885–1886)
