= Desilets =

Desilets or Désilets is a surname.

== List of people with the surname ==
- Antoine Desilets (1927–2019), Québécois photographer
- Joel Desilets, American politician
- Joffre Desilets (1915–1994), Canadian ice hockey player
- Jordan Desilets (born 1980), American steeplechase runner
- Luc Desilets, Canadian politician
- Makare Desilets (born 1976), American volleyball player
- Patrice Désilets (born 1974), Canadian game designer
- Rémy Désilets (born 1952), Canadian politician

== See also ==
- Desilets v. Clearview Regional Board of Education
