= Gaboury =

Gaboury (French: nickname for a joker derived from Old French gabeor "mocker, scoffer, joker") is a surname.

All Gabourys in North America (including the spelling variations of Gabourie, Gabaree, Gabree, and Gibree) are related because they are all descendants of Antoine Gaboury, who left France in 1659 for the Quebec settlement in New France.

People with the surname include:

- Amédée Gaboury (1838–1912), Canadian politician
- Étienne Gaboury (1930–2022), Canadian architect
- Kim Gaboury, AKA aKido, Canadian musician and composer
- Marie-Anne Gaboury (1780–1875), Canadian explorer and settler, grandmother of Louis Riel
- Stephen Gaboury, American musician and record producer
- Tancrède-Charles Gaboury (1851–1937), Canadian politician
