= Lucie Leblanc =

Canadian politician (born 1962)

MNA for Deux-Montagnes
- In office April 25, 2007 – November 5, 2008
- Preceded by: Hélène Robert
- Succeeded by: Benoit Charette

Personal details
- Born: April 1, 1962 (age 64) Montreal, Quebec
- Party: Action démocratique du Québec
- Spouse: Michel Gagnon

Lucie Leblanc (born April 1, 1962 in Montreal, Quebec) is a politician from Quebec, Canada. She was an Action démocratique du Québec (ADQ) Member of the National Assembly for the electoral district of Deux-Montagnes from 2007 to 2008.

== Background ==
She was the owner of a computer and accountancy company for over 20 years. She served as a municipal councillor from 1998 to 2002 and as mayor from 2002 to 2005 in Sainte-Marthe-sur-le-Lac. She was also a member of the elected regional council of the Laurentians as well as the region police and the businesswomen network of the Laurentians.

== Member of the Provincial Legislature ==
Leblanc was nominated as an ADQ candidate for the 2007 election, after Jean-François Plante's candidacy was dismissed by his own party. Plante, a former Vision Montréal Councillor in Montreal, had made a controversial statements about women's rights and accused openly gay Parti Québécois (PQ) leader André Boisclair of taking advantage of his sexual orientation.

Leblanc won a narrow victory to represent the district of Deux-Montagnes with 36% of the vote. PQ candidate Daniel Goyer finished second with 33% of the vote. Leblanc took office on April 12, 2007.

== Federal politics ==
She campaigned on behalf of local Conservative candidate Claude Carignan during the federal election of 2008. Carignan finished a distant second against Bloc Québécois candidate Luc Desnoyers in the district of Rivière-des-Mille-Îles.

She was then the Conservative candidate for the same district in the federal election of 2011. She finished fourth with 5,057 votes (9.7 per cent of the votes) against NDP candidate Laurin Liu.
