= Émery Lalonde Jr. =

Canadian politician

Émery Lalonde
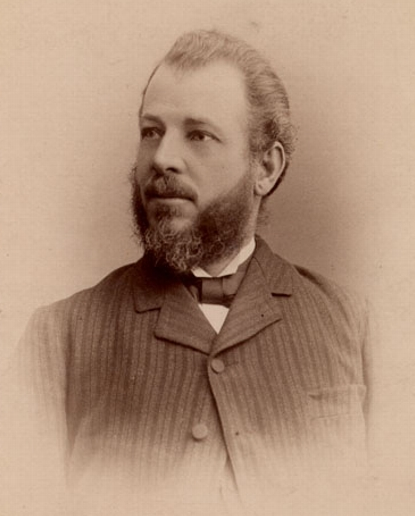

Member of the Legislative Assembly of Quebec for Vaudreuil
- In office 1890–1892
- Preceded by: Alfred Lapointe
- Succeeded by: Hilaire Cholette
- In office 1897–1901
- Preceded by: Hilaire Cholette
- Succeeded by: Hormisdas Pilon

Personal details
- Born: June 22, 1851 Sainte-Marthe, Canada East
- Died: June 6, 1925 (aged 73) Montreal, Quebec
- Party: Liberal
- Relations: Émery Lalonde Sr., father

Émery Lalonde (June 22, 1851 – June 6, 1925) was a physician and political figure in Quebec. He represented Vaudreuil in the Legislative Assembly of Quebec as a Liberal member from 1890 to 1892 and from 1897 to 1901.

He was born in Sainte-Marthe, Canada East, the son of Émery Lalonde and Marie-Claire-Louise Prévost. Lalonde was educated at the Collège des Sulpiciens and the Victoria College of Medicine in Montreal. He qualified as a doctor in 1873 and practised in Sainte-Marthe and Rigaud. Also in 1873, he married Émélie-Rosalie Gariépy. Lalonde ran unsuccessfully for a seat in the Quebec assembly in 1882 and 1886 and for a seat in the House of Commons in 1887. His election in 1890 was appealed but he won the by-election that followed later that year. He was defeated by Hilaire Cholette when he ran for reelection in 1892. Lalonde was mayor of Rigaud from 1893 to 1900. He raised bees for nearly forty years and was one of the founding members of the Apicultural Society for Quebec. Lalonde was also an assessor for the federally operated Soulanges Canal. He resigned his seat in the assembly in 1901 after being named co-registrar for Montréal-Est. Lalonde died in Montreal at the age of 73 and was buried in the Notre Dame des Neiges Cemetery.
