= Thomas-Jean-Jacques Loranger =

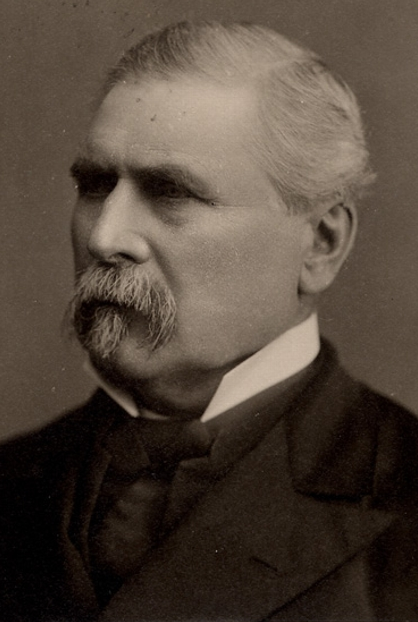
Thomas-Jean-Jacques Loranger

Thomas-Jean-Jacques Loranger, QC (February 2, 1823 – August 18, 1885) was a Quebec judge and political figure.

He was born in Yamachiche in Lower Canada in 1823. He studied at the Séminaire de Nicolet, then articled in law with Antoine Polette and was called to the bar in 1844. Loranger first practiced at Trois-Rivières, later joined the office of Lewis Thomas Drummond in Montreal and, in 1858, opened an office with his brothers Louis-Onésime and Jean-Marie. He was named Queen's Counsel in 1854. Loranger was elected to the Legislative Assembly of the Province of Canada for Laprairie in 1854; he was reelected in 1857. He served on the Executive Council as secretary for Canada East. He opposed the idea of a double majority, where legislation must be approved by a majority of the representatives from both provinces, but believed that legislation affecting one province should be approved by a majority in that province. He supported Montreal as a capital and opposed the choice of Ottawa; this led to the resignation of the government of John A. Macdonald and George-Étienne Cartier in 1858. Loranger continued as a member in the legislature until he was named judge in the Quebec Superior Court in 1863. In 1873, he published the first volume of Commentaire sur le Code civil du Bas-Canada, a discussion of the civil code of Quebec; a second volume was published in 1879 but the work was never completed. He also contributed articles to legal journals of the time. In 1877, he was named to head a commission to codify the general statutes of Quebec. Loranger retired in 1879 and became professor at the Université Laval. In 1883 and 1884, he published a two volume work on the federal constitution.

He died in Sainte-Pétronille in 1885 and was buried in the Côte-des-Neiges cemetery in Montreal.
