= Pierre de Bellefeuille =

Canadian politician (1923–2015)

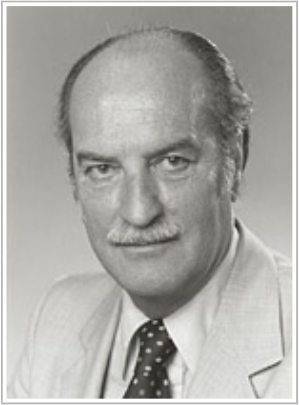
Pierre de Bellefeuille

Pierre de Bellefeuille, OC (May 12, 1923 – September 30, 2015) was a Canadian journalist and politician.

He was journalist for Le Droit in Ottawa (1945-1951), head of services at the National Film Board (1951-1960), editor-in-chief of Le Magazine Maclean (1960-1964), board director of the Quebec Press Council, president of Société historique of Deux-Montagnes from 1974 à 1976, president of the Syndicat des journalistes d'Ottawa and of the Cercle des journalistes d'Ottawa and a two-term Member of the National Assembly of Quebec.

== Background ==
He was born on May 12, 1923, in Ottawa, Ontario.

== Federal politics ==
De Bellefeuille ran as a New Democratic Party candidate in the 1972 election in the federal district of Ahuntsic. He finished second against Liberal candidate Jeanne Sauvé.

== Member of the National Assembly ==
He ran as a Parti Québécois candidate in the 1976 election against Liberal incumbent Jean-Paul L'Allier in the provincial district of Deux-Montagnes and won. He served as a parliamentary assistant from 1976 to 1984.

He was re-elected in the 1981 election, but he crossed the floor during the Parti Québécois Crisis of 1984. He sat as an Independent by November 20, 1984, and became the only sitting Member of the Parti indépendantiste.

De Bellefeuille ran for re-election as a candidate of that party in the 1985 election. He finished third.

== Footnotes ==
National Assembly of Quebec
Preceded by Jean-Paul L'Allier (Liberal)	MNA for Deux-Montagnes; 1976–1985	Succeeded by Yolande D. Legault (Liberal)
