= Vaudreuil (provincial electoral district) =

Provincial electoral district in Quebec, Canada

Coordinates: 45.39°N 74.06°W

Quebec electoral district
- Location in Vaudreuil-Soulanges

Provincial electoral district
- Legislature: National Assembly of Quebec
MNA
James Hughes
Liberal
- District created: 1867
- District abolished: 1939
- District re-created: 1988
- First contested: 1867, 1989
- Last contested: 1939, 2026

Demographics
- Population (2006): 65,289
- Electors (2014): 58,822
- Area (km²): 225.6
- Pop. density (per km²): 289.4
- Census division: Vaudreuil-Soulanges (part)
- Census subdivision(s): L'Île-Cadieux, L'Île-Perrot, Notre-Dame-de-l'Île-Perrot, Pincourt, Terrasse-Vaudreuil, Vaudreuil-Dorion, Vaudreuil-sur-le-Lac

Vaudreuil (French pronunciation: [vodʁœj]) is a provincial electoral district in the Montérégie region of Quebec, Canada, that elects members to the National Assembly of Quebec. The biggest municipality in the district is Vaudreuil-Dorion.

It was created for the 1867 election (and an electoral district of that name existed earlier in the Legislative Assembly of the Province of Canada and the Legislative Assembly of Lower Canada). Its final election was in 1936. It disappeared in the 1939 election and its successor electoral district was Vaudreuil-Soulanges.

It was re-created for the 1989 election from the eastern part of Vaudreuil-Soulanges electoral district.

In the change from the 2001 to the 2011 electoral map, its territory was unchanged.

It was named after former governor of New France from 1703 to 1725, Philippe de Rigaud de Vaudreuil.

== Members of the Legislative Assembly / National Assembly ==
Legislature	Years	Member	Party
1st	1867–1871	Antoine-Chartier de Lotbinière Harwood	Conservative
2nd	1871–1875	Émery Lalonde Sr.	Conservative
3rd	1875–1878	Émery Lalonde Sr.	Conservative
4th	1878–1881	Émery Lalonde Sr.	Conservative
5th	1881–1882	Émery Lalonde Sr.	Conservative
5th	1882–1884	François-Xavier Archambault	Conservative
5th	1884–1886	Alfred Lapointe	Conservative
6th	1886–1890	Alfred Lapointe	Conservative
7th	1890–1892	Émery Lalonde Jr.	Liberal
8th	1892–1897	Hilaire Cholette	Conservative
9th	1897–1900	Émery Lalonde Jr.	Liberal
10th	1900–1901	Émery Lalonde Jr.	Liberal
10th	1901–1904	Hormisdas Pilon	Liberal
11th	1904–1908	Hormisdas Pilon	Liberal
12th	1908–1912	Hormisdas Pilon	Liberal
13th	1912–1916	Hormisdas Pilon	Liberal
14th	1916–1919	Hormisdas Pilon	Liberal
15th	1919–1923	Hormisdas Pilon	Liberal
16th	1923–1927	Hormisdas Pilon	Liberal
17th	1927–1931	Hormisdas Pilon	Liberal
18th	1931–1935	Elzéar Sabourin	Liberal
19th	1935–1936	Elzéar Sabourin	Liberal
20th	1936–1939	Lionel Bellemare	Union Nationale
Riding dissolved into Vaudreuil-Soulanges
Riding re-created from Vaudreuil-Soulanges
34th	1989–1994	Daniel Johnson Jr.	Liberal
35th	1994–1998	Daniel Johnson Jr.	Liberal
36th	1998–2003	Yvon Marcoux	Liberal
37th	2003–2007	Yvon Marcoux	Liberal
38th	2007–2008	Yvon Marcoux	Liberal
39th	2008–2012	Yvon Marcoux	Liberal
40th	2012–2014	Yvon Marcoux	Liberal
41st	2014–2018	Marie-Claude Nichols	Liberal
42nd	2018–2022	Marie-Claude Nichols	Liberal
43rd	2022–2022	Marie-Claude Nichols	Liberal
43rd	2022–2025	Marie-Claude Nichols	Independent
43rd	2025–2026	Marie-Claude Nichols	Liberal
44th	2026–Present	James Hughes	Liberal

== Election results ==
2026 Quebec general election
** Preliminary results — Not yet official **
Party	Candidate	Votes	%	±%
Liberal	James Hughes	18,783	46.75	
Parti Québécois	Meili Faille	7,980	19.86	
Conservative	Patrick Caron	5,715	14.22	
Coalition Avenir Québec	Chantal Darcy	4,263	10.61	
Québec solidaire	Jeannette Uwantege	2,927	7.29	
Green	Carole Thériault	509	1.27	
Total valid votes				
Total rejected ballots				
Turnout			65.05	
Electors on the lists			–	–
Liberal hold		Swing		
Source: Élections Québec

2022 Quebec general election
Party	Candidate	Votes	%	±%
Liberal	Marie-Claude Nichols	13,608	34.22	-5.70
Coalition Avenir Québec	Eve Bélec	13,032	32.77	+0.14
Conservative	Eve Théoret	4,619	11.62	+9.92
Québec solidaire	Cynthia Bilodeau	3,671	9.23	-0.82
Parti Québécois	Christopher Massé	3,061	7.70	-2.35
Canadian	David Hamelin-Schuilenburg	726	1.83	–
Green	Kelley Boileau	496	1.25	-1.45
Bloc Montreal	Jaspal Singh Ahluwalia	477	1.20	–
Démocratie directe	Paul Lynes	75	0.19	–
Total valid votes		39,765	98.97	
Total rejected ballots		415	1.03	
Turnout		40,180	65.19	-0.51
Electors on the lists		61,632		
Liberal hold		Swing		–

2018 Quebec general election
Party	Candidate	Votes	%	±%
Liberal	Marie-Claude Nichols	15,143	39.92	-21.27
Coalition Avenir Québec	Claude Bourbonnais	12,378	32.63	+17.01
Parti Québécois	Philip Lapalme	3,813	10.05	-5.91
Québec solidaire	Igor Erchov	3,811	10.05	+5.41
Green	Jason Mossa	1,026	2.70	+1.42
Conservative	Ryan Robertson	644	1.70	+1.27
New Democratic	Ryan Young	568	1.50	
Citoyens au pouvoir	Daniel Pilon	343	0.90	
Bloc Pot	Camille Piché-Jetté	206	0.54	
Total valid votes		37,932	98.68	
Total rejected ballots		508	1.32	+0.17
Turnout		38,440	65.70	-12.29
Eligible voters		58,504		
Liberal hold		Swing		-19.14
Source(s) "Rapport des résultats officiels du scrutin". Élections Québec.

2014 Quebec general election
Party	Candidate	Votes	%	±%
Liberal	Marie-Claude Nichols	27,750	61.19	+16.12
Parti Québécois	Marcos Archambault	7,238	15.96	-4.75
Coalition Avenir Québec	Luc Tison	7,084	15.62	-10.00
Québec solidaire	David Fortin Côté	2,101	4.63	-0.25
Green	Thomas Radcliffe	584	1.29	-1.19
Conservative	Michel Paul	196	0.43	–
Parti équitable	Julien Leclerc	190	0.42	–
Option nationale	Jean-Gabriel Cauchon	115	0.25	-0.78
Mon pays le Québec	Léon Dupré	90	0.20	–
Total valid votes		45,348	98.95	–
Total rejected ballots		528	1.15	–
Turnout		45,876	77.99	+1.56
Electors on the lists		58,822	–	–

2012 Quebec general election
Party	Candidate	Votes	%	±%
Liberal	Yvon Marcoux	19,375	45.07	-8.95
Coalition Avenir Québec	Martin Legault	11,013	25.62	+16.75*
Parti Québécois	Kim Comeau	8,902	20.71	-9.33
Québec solidaire	Marc-André Pilon	2,099	4.88	+3.03
Green	Julien Leclerc	1,067	2.48	-1.23
Option nationale	Julien Bédard	444	1.03	–
Quebec Citizens' Union	Étienne Ouellet	93	0.22	–
Total valid votes		42,993	98.99	–
Total rejected ballots		437	1.01	–
Turnout		43,430	76.43	+19.10
Electors on the lists		56,822	–	–

* Result compared to Action démocratique

2008 Quebec general election
Party	Candidate	Votes	%	±%
Liberal	Yvon Marcoux	15,827	54.02	+9.82
Parti Québécois	Claude Turcotte	8,801	30.04	+6.56
Action démocratique	Lucie Boudreault	2,599	8.87	-16.24
Green	Julien Leclerc	1,086	3.71	-1.54
Québec solidaire	Maria-Pia Chávez	543	1.85	-0.11
Independent	Kevin Côté	305	1.04	–
Republic of Quebec	Gilles Paquette	140	0.48	–
Total valid votes		29,301	98.43	–
Total rejected ballots		466	1.57	–
Turnout		29,767	57.33	-15.25
Electors on the lists		51,919	–	–

2007 Quebec general election
Party	Candidate	Votes	%	±%
Liberal	Yvon Marcoux	15,465	44.20	-13.47
Action démocratique	Jean-Claude Levesque	8,787	25.11	+14.23
Parti Québécois	Louisanne Chevrier	8,217	23.48	-6.07
Green	Jean-Yves Massenet	1,837	5.25	–
Québec solidaire	Micheline Déry	686	1.96	–
Total valid votes		34,992	99.07	–
Total rejected ballots		327	0.93	–
Turnout		35,319	72.58	-1.46
Electors on the lists		48,661	–	–

2003 Quebec general election
Party	Candidate	Votes	%	±%
Liberal	Yvon Marcoux	18,490	57.67	+5.75
Parti Québécois	Carole Cardinal	9,474	29.55	-7.18
Action démocratique	Luc Tison	3,487	10.88	+0.87
Bloc Pot	Kathleen Mary Mangin	488	1.52	–
Equality	Ernest Semple	120	0.37	-0.48
Total valid votes		32,059	98.77	–
Total rejected ballots		399	1.23	–
Turnout		32,458	74.04	-7.75
Electors on the lists		43,842	–	–

== See also ==
- List of Quebec provincial electoral districts
- Canadian provincial electoral districts
