= Rivière-des-Mille-Îles (electoral district) =

Federal electoral district in Quebec, Canada

Coordinates: 45.602°N 73.878°W

Quebec electoral district
- Interactive map of riding boundaries from the 2025 federal election

Federal electoral district
- Legislature: House of Commons
MP
Linda Lapointe
Liberal
- District created: 1996
- First contested: 1997
- Last contested: 2025
- District webpage: profile, map

Demographics
- Population (2011): 102,816
- Electors (2015): 80,957
- Area (km²): 117
- Pop. density (per km²): 878.8
- Census division(s): Deux-Montagnes RCM, Thérèse-De Blainville RCM
- Census subdivision(s): Saint-Eustache (part), Boisbriand, Deux-Montagnes, Rosemère

Rivière-des-Mille-Îles (French pronunciation: [ʁivjɛʁ de mil il]; formerly known as Saint-Eustache—Sainte-Thérèse) is a federal electoral district in Quebec, Canada, that has been represented in the House of Commons of Canada since 1997.

== Geography ==
This riding is located in the northern suburbs of Montreal, on the north shore of the Rivière des Mille-Îles. Since 2003, it has consisted of the cities of Deux-Montagnes, Saint-Eustache and Sainte-Marthe-sur-le-Lac in the Regional County Municipality of Deux-Montagnes; and the City of Boisbriand in the Regional County Municipality of Thérèse-De Blainville.

The neighbouring ridings are Mirabel, Thérèse-De Blainville, Marc-Aurèle-Fortin, Laval—Les Îles, and Pierrefonds—Dollard.

== Demographics ==
According to the 2021 Canadian census, 2023 Representation Order

Racial groups: 87.3% White, 3.4% Black, 2.8% Arab, 1.8% Latin American, 1.7% Indigenous
Languages: 80.7% French, 9.4% English, 2.1% Arabic, 1.9% Yiddish, 1.8% Spanish
Religions: 65.3% Christian (54.8% Catholic, 2.3% Christian Orthodox, 8.2% Other), 3.6% Muslim, 2.7% Jewish, 27.4% None
Median income: $44,000 (2020)
Average income: $53,650 (2020)

== History ==
It was created in 1996 as "Saint-Eustache—Sainte-Thérèse" riding from parts of Blainville—Deux-Montagnes riding.

It was renamed "Rivière-des-Mille-Îles" in 1998.

This riding lost territory to Mirabel and gained territory from Marc-Aurèle-Fortin during the 2012 electoral redistribution.

Following the 2022 Canadian federal electoral redistribution, the riding lost its territory west of Montée Laurin, south of Ch. de la Rivière-Sud and west of Boul. Industriel in Saint-Eustache to Mirabel.

=== Members of Parliament ===
Parliament	Years	Member	Party
Saint-Eustache—Sainte-Thérèse; Riding created from Blainville—Deux-Montagnes
36th	1997–2000	Gilles Perron	Bloc Québécois
Rivière-des-Mille-Îles
37th	2000–2004	Gilles Perron	Bloc Québécois
38th	2004–2006	Gilles Perron	Bloc Québécois
39th	2006–2008	Gilles Perron	Bloc Québécois
40th	2008–2011	Luc Desnoyers	Bloc Québécois
41st	2011–2015	Laurin Liu	New Democratic
42nd	2015–2019	Linda Lapointe	Liberal
43rd	2019–2021	Luc Desilets	Bloc Québécois
44th	2021–2025	Luc Desilets	Bloc Québécois
45th	2025–present	Linda Lapointe	Liberal

== Election results ==
Graph of election results in Rivière-des-Mille-Îles (minor parties that never got 2% of the vote or didn't run consistently are omitted)

=== Rivière-des-Mille-Îles ===
2025 Canadian federal election
Party	Candidate	Votes	%	±%	Expenditures
Liberal	Linda Lapointe	27,218	45.63	+10.27	$74,940.63
Bloc Québécois	Luc Desilets	19,669	32.84	–7.70	$27,036.09
Conservative	Elia Lopez	10,398	17.36	+7.11	$15,000.17
New Democratic	Joseph Hakizimana	1,270	2.12	–5.08	$0.00
Green	Alec Ware	734	1.23	–0.51	$0.00
People's	David Santamaria Quiceno	306	0.51	–2.24	$0.00
Independent	Michel Genois	184	0.31	N/A	$3,129.29
Total valid votes		59,887	98.58	+0.54	$130,777.41
Total rejected ballots		862	1.42	–0.54	
Turnout		60,749	71.80	+6.34	
Eligible voters		84,606			
Liberal notional gain from Bloc Québécois		Swing		+8.98	
Source: Elections Canada

2021 federal election redistributed results
Party	Vote	%
Bloc Québécois	21,522	40.54
Liberal	18,770	35.36
Conservative	5,441	10.25
New Democratic	3,825	7.20
People's	1,458	2.75
Green	966	1.82
Free	842	1.59
Patriote	148	0.28
Pour l'Indépendance du Québec	118	0.22
Total valid votes	53,090	98.04
Rejected ballots	1,059	1.96
Registered voters/ estimated turnout	82,720	65.46

2021 Canadian federal election
Party	Candidate	Votes	%	±%	Expenditures
Bloc Québécois	Luc Desilets	21,645	40.6	±0.0	$17,235.31
Liberal	Linda Lapointe	18,835	35.3	-0.8	$63,876.62
Conservative	Marc Duffy-Vincelette	5,479	10.3	+2.2	$9,189.50
New Democratic	Joseph Hakizimana	3,852	7.2	-1.4	$24.86
People's	Hans Roker Jr.	1,468	2.8	+1.3	$0.00
Green	Alex Ware	972	1.8	-3.4	$0.00
Free	Valérie Beauséjour	847	1.6	N/A	$0.00
Patriote	Michael Dionne	149	0.3	N/A	$0.00
Indépendance du Québec	Julius Bute	119	0.2	N/A	$0.00
Total valid votes/expense limit		53,366	98.1	–	$113,035.56
Total rejected ballots		1,061	1.9		
Turnout		54,427	65.4		
Eligible voters		83,171			
Bloc Québécois hold		Swing		+0.4	
Source: Elections Canada

2019 Canadian federal election
Party	Candidate	Votes	%	±%	Expenditures
Bloc Québécois	Luc Desilets	23,629	40.61	+15.19	$9,764.52
Liberal	Linda Lapointe	21,009	36.11	+3.74	none listed
New Democratic	Joseph Hakizimana	5,002	8.60	-20.88	$19,322.13
Conservative	Maikel Mikhael	4,684	8.05	-2.46	$20,256.23
Green	Ceylan Borgers	3,015	5.18	+3.22	none listed
People's	Hans Roker Jr.	845	1.45	–	$1,000.00
Total valid votes/expense limit		58,184	98.16		
Total rejected ballots		1,090	1.84	+0.27	
Turnout		59,274	71.96	-0.38	
Eligible voters		82,372			
Bloc Québécois gain from Liberal		Swing		+5.72	
Source: Elections Canada

2015 Canadian federal election
Party	Candidate	Votes	%	±%	Expenditures
Liberal	Linda Lapointe	18,787	32.37	+21.27	$24,179.08
New Democratic	Laurin Liu	17,111	29.48	-19.64	$54,641.76
Bloc Québécois	Félix Pinel	14,755	25.42	-1.70	$40,335.73
Conservative	Érick Gauthier	6,099	10.51	+0.21	$31,082.28
Green	Alec Ware	1,136	1.96	-0.41	$665.90
Independent	Luis Quinteros	158	0.27	n/a	–
Total valid votes/Expense limit		58,046	98.43		$217,630.75
Total rejected ballots		927	1.57	–	
Turnout		58,973	72.33	–	
Eligible voters		81,528			
Liberal gain from New Democratic		Swing		+20.45	
Source: Elections Canada

2011 federal election redistributed results
Party	Vote	%
New Democratic	25,758	49.1
Bloc Québécois	14,223	27.1
Liberal	5,819	11.1
Conservative	5,399	10.3
Green	1,242	2.4

2011 Canadian federal election
Party	Candidate	Votes	%	±%	Expenditures
New Democratic	Laurin Liu	25,639	49.2	+35.9	
Bloc Québécois	Luc Desnoyers	14,873	28.5	-16.8	
Liberal	Denis Joannette	5,300	10.2	-7.2	
Conservative	Lucie Leblanc	5,057	9.7	-9.8	
Green	Gilles Bisson	1,229	2.4	-1.8	
Total valid votes/Expense limit		52,098	100.0		
Total rejected ballots		973	1.8	–	
Turnout		53,071	66.8	–	
Eligible voters		79,428	–		

2008 Canadian federal election
Party	Candidate	Votes	%	±%	Expenditures
Bloc Québécois	Luc Desnoyers	23,216	45.7	-8.2	$52,131
Conservative	Claude Carignan	9,911	19.5	-1.4	$81,773
Liberal	Denis Joannette	8,823	17.4	+4.6	$15,359
New Democratic	Normand Beaudet	6,741	13.3	+6.3	$1,453
Green	Marie Martine Bédard	2,134	4.2	-1.2	$3,053
Total valid votes/Expense limit		50,825	100.0	$83,475	

2006 Canadian federal election
Party	Candidate	Votes	%	±%	Expenditures
Bloc Québécois	Gilles Perron	26,272	53.9	-7.5	$28,133
Conservative	Érick Gauthier	10,173	20.9	+14.2	$5,917
Liberal	Robert Frégeau	6,239	12.8	-11.4	$30,097
New Democratic	Francis Chartrand	3,418	7.0	+3.6	$1,522
Green	Marie Martine Bédard	2,643	5.4	+1.1	$1,860
Total valid votes/Expense limit		48,745	100.0	$76,468	

2004 Canadian federal election
Party	Candidate	Votes	%	±%	Expenditures
Bloc Québécois	Gilles Perron	27,993	61.4	+12.0	$36,071
Liberal	Yolaine Savignac	11,025	24.2	-10.2	$36,430
Conservative	Érick Gauthier	3,064	6.7	-5.6	$6,653
Green	Marie Martine Bédard	1,961	4.3	+1.8	$1,319
New Democratic	Nicolas Du Cap	1,559	3.4	+2.0	$411
Total valid votes/Expense limit		45,602	100.0	$74,324	

Note: Conservative vote is compared to the total of the Canadian Alliance vote and Progressive Conservative vote in 2000 election.

2000 Canadian federal election
Party	Candidate	Votes	%	±%
Bloc Québécois	Gilles Perron	26,508	49.4	+3.0
Liberal	Robert Fragasso	18,456	34.4	+5.1
Alliance	François Desrochers	3,677	6.9	
Progressive Conservative	Jonathan Paquette	2,935	5.5	-17.1
Green	Eric Squire	1,329	2.5	
New Democratic	Stéphane Thinel	739	1.4	-0.3
Total valid votes		53,644	100.0	

=== Saint-Eustache—Sainte-Thérèse ===
1997 Canadian federal election
Party	Candidate	Votes	%
Bloc Québécois	Gilles Perron	25,807	46.5
Liberal	Yolaine Savignac	16,280	29.3
Progressive Conservative	Jean Blanchard	12,522	22.5
New Democratic	Valérie Kinslow	947	1.7
Total valid votes		55,556	100.0

== See also ==
- List of Canadian electoral districts
- Historical federal electoral districts of Canada
