= Charles Champagne (Deux-Montagnes MLA) =

Canadian politician

Charles Laplante dit Champagne
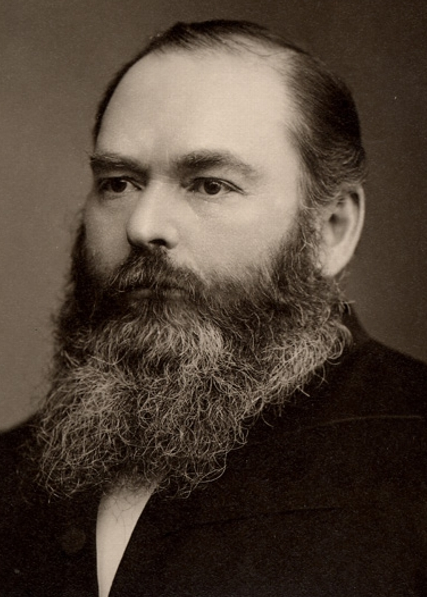

Member of the Legislative Assembly of Quebec for Deux-Montagnes
- In office 1876–1882
- Preceded by: Gédéon Ouimet
- Succeeded by: Benjamin Beauchamp

Member of the Legislative Council of Quebec for Mille-Isles
- In office 1883–1888
- Preceded by: Alexandre Lacoste
- Succeeded by: David Marsil

Personal details
- Born: October 16, 1838 Saint-Eustache, Lower Canada
- Died: December 22, 1907 (aged 69) Montreal, Quebec
- Party: Conservative
- Children: Louis Napoléon Champagne

Charles Laplante dit Champagne (French pronunciation: [ʃaʁl laplɑ̃t di ʃɑ̃paɲ]; October 16, 1838 – December 22, 1907) was a lawyer, judge and political figure in Quebec. He represented Deux-Montagnes in the Legislative Assembly of Quebec from 1876 to 1882 as a Conservative. His name also appears as Charles Champagne.

He was born in Saint-Eustache, Lower Canada, the son of Charles Laplante dit Champagne and Christine Andrave. He was educated at the Séminaire de Sainte-Thérèse-de-Blainville and worked on the family farm, going on to study law with Gédéon Ouimet and Joseph-Adolphe Chapleau. In 1860, he married Aglaé Éthier. He was admitted to the Lower Canada bar in 1865. Champagne was first elected to the Quebec assembly in an 1876 by-election held after Gédéon Ouimet resigned his seat. He resigned his seat in 1882 and ran unsuccessfully for reelection later that year. Champagne was named to the Legislative Council of Quebec for Mille-Isles division in 1883 and served until 1888, when he was named a magistrate for Montreal district. In 1887, he was named Queen's Counsel. He was named a judge for the circuit court in Montreal district in 1893. Champagne died in Montreal at the age of 69 and was buried in Saint-Eustache.

His son Louis-Napoléon served in the Canadian House of Commons. His cousin Hector Champagne also served in the Quebec assembly and as a legislative councillor.

His daughter Eugénie married Edgar-Rodolphe-Eugène Chevrier.
