= Hormisdas Pilon =

Canadian politician

Member of the Legislative Assembly of Quebec for Vaudreuil
- In office 1901–1931
- Preceded by: Émery Lalonde, Jr.
- Succeeded by: Elzéar Sabourin

Personal details
- Born: April 1, 1857 Vaudreuil, Canada East
- Died: July 15, 1937 (aged 80) Vaudreuil, Quebec
- Party: Liberal

Hormisdas Pilon (April 1, 1857 – July 15, 1937) was a Quebec politician. He was the Member of the Quebec Legislative Assembly for 30 years.

Pilon, born in Vaudreuil, Canada East. He studied in general medicine at Collège Bourget in Rigaud and then studied veterinarian medicine. He practised his profession for several years and later was also a farmer as well as a school commissioner in Vaudreuil for 12 years. He also served as the mayor of the Saint-Michel-de-Vaudreuil parish from 1900 to 1911.

He was first elected in the Vaudreuil riding as a Quebec Liberal Party member in a by-election in 1901. He was later re-elected for seven other terms until 1931. While he was never a Cabinet Minister, Pilon did serve as Chief Whip of the government.
