= François-Xavier Archambault =

Canadian politician

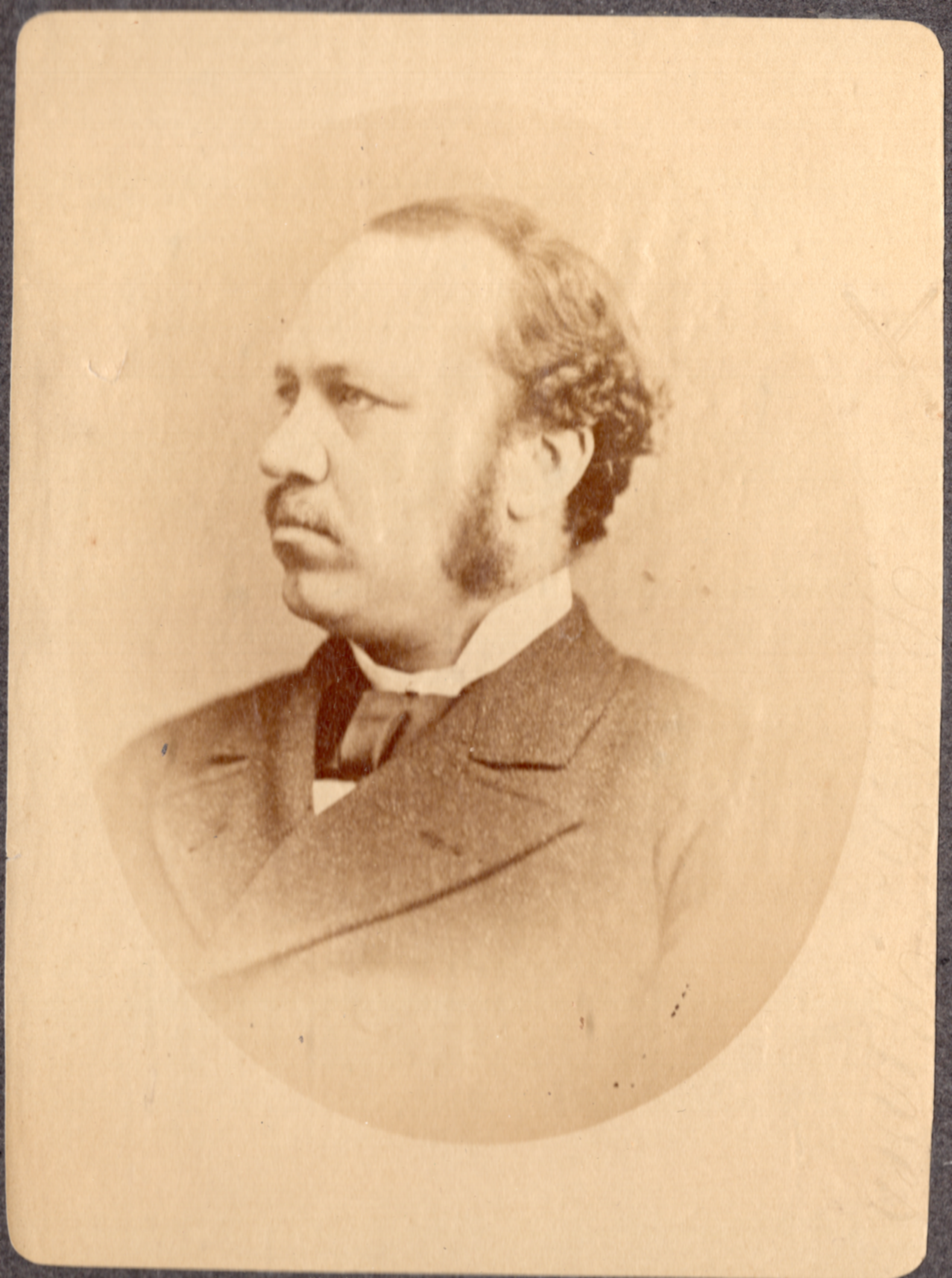

Member of the Legislative Assembly of Quebec for Vaudreuil
- In office 1882–1884
- Preceded by: Émery Lalonde, Sr.
- Succeeded by: Alfred Lapointe

Personal details
- Born: September 18, 1841 Saint-Vincent-de-Paul on Île Jésus in Canada East
- Died: June 3, 1893 (aged 51) Montreal, Quebec
- Resting place: Notre Dame des Neiges Cemetery
- Party: Conservative

François-Xavier Archambault, QC (September 18, 1841 – June 3, 1893) was a Canadian politician and lawyer in Quebec. He represented Vaudreuil in the Legislative Assembly of Quebec from 1882 to 1884 as a Conservative.

He was born in Saint-Vincent-de-Paul on Île Jésus in Canada East, the son of Jean-Baptiste Archambault and Marie-Louise Auclair. Archambault was educated at the Collège de Sainte-Thérèse and in Montreal. He was admitted to the Lower Canada bar in 1863 and entered practice with his brother Cyrille. He served as crown attorney and acting solicitor general at Montreal. In 1864, he married Marie-Louise-Octavie Saint-Louis. Archambault was named Queen's Counsel in 1878. He was an unsuccessful candidate for a seat in the House of Commons in 1878 and 1882. Archambault was elected to the Quebec assembly in an 1882 by-election held after the election of Émery Lalonde was overturned. His election was declared invalid by the Quebec Superior Court in 1884. Archambault was mayor of Dorion in 1891 and 1892. He died in Montreal at the age of 51 and was buried in the Notre Dame des Neiges Cemetery.

His daughter Berthe married Rodolphe Tourville. His uncle Louis-Adélard Senécal served in the Quebec assembly, the House of Commons and the Canadian senate.

After his death in 1893, he was entombed at the Notre Dame des Neiges Cemetery in Montreal.
