= Hilaire Cholette =

Canadian politician

Hilaire Cholette (January 1, 1856 – May 21, 1905) was a Canadian physician and political figure. He represented Vaudreuil in the Legislative Assembly of Quebec from 1892 to 1897 as a Conservative.

He was born in Rigaud, Canada East, the son of Hyacinthe Cholet and Julie Séguin, and was educated at the Collège Bourget and Victoria College in Montreal. He received his diploma in medicine in 1876 and set up practice in Sainte-Justine-de-Newton. In 1883, Cholette married Marie-Corinne Taylor. He was a justice of the peace and also served on the municipal council for Sainte-Justine-de-Newton. Cholette was defeated by Émery Lalonde when he ran for a seat in the Quebec assembly in 1890. He defeated Lalonde in 1892 but lost to him when he ran for reelection in 1897. Cholette died in Sainte-Justine-de-Newton at the age of 49.
