= Benoit Charette =

Canadian politician

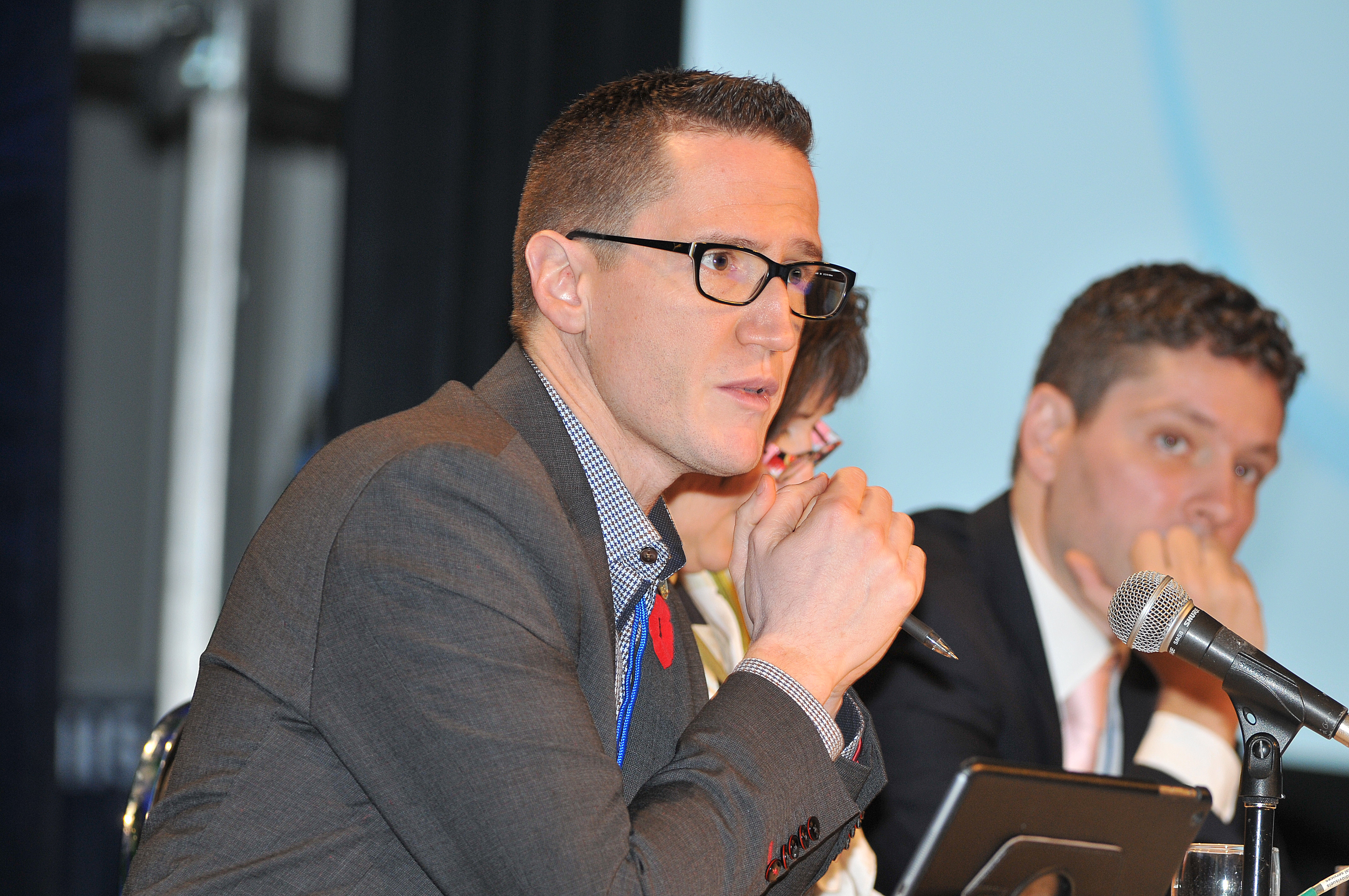
- Charrette in 2015

Quebec Minister of Transport and Sustainable Mobility
- In office April 21, 2026 – October 21, 2026
- Premier: Christine Fréchette
- Preceded by: Jonatan Julien
- Succeeded by: Nicolas Girard

Member of the National Assembly of Quebec for Deux-Montagnes
- In office April 7, 2014 – August 27, 2026
- Preceded by: Daniel Goyer
- Succeeded by: Linda Vaillant
- In office December 8, 2008 – September 4, 2012
- Preceded by: Lucie Leblanc
- Succeeded by: Daniel Goyer

Personal details
- Born: July 19, 1976 (age 50) Saint-Jérôme, Quebec, Canada
- Party: CAQ (2011-present)
- Other political affiliations: Independent (2011-2011); Parti Québécois (2008-2011)

Benoit Charette (born July 19, 1976) is a Canadian politician who was elected in the 2008 provincial election for Deux-Montagnes.

Charette defeated the ADQ's Lucie Leblanc in Deux-Montagnes in the 2008 elections. He was a member of the Parti Québécois, but left the party on June 21, 2011, to protest the party's focus on sovereignty. On December 19, 2011, he joined the Coalition Avenir Québec, and served in the Legault ministry and the Fréchette ministry in various roles.

A graduate of Université du Québec à Montréal with a bachelor's degree in history, he also studied municipal development at the École nationale d'administration publique. He worked as a program manager at the Ministry of International Relations. He was also responsible for the documentation center at the Quebec General Delegation Délégation générale du Québec in Mexico.

== Electoral record ==
2022 Quebec general election: Deux-Montagnes
| Party | Candidate | Votes | % | ±% |
|---|---|---|---|---|
| Coalition Avenir Québec | Benoît Charette | 15,854 | 47.08 | -0.36 |
| Parti Québécois | Guillaume Lalonde | 5,777 | 17.16 | -1.97 |
| Québec solidaire | Olivier Côté | 4,766 | 14.15 | -0.38 |
| Liberal | Marc Allaire | 3,460 | 10.27 | -3.10 |
| Conservative | Isabelle Baril | 3,308 | 9.82 | +8.73 |
| Green | Amavi Tagodoe | 317 | 0.94 | -1.19 |
| Climat Québec | Hélèna Courteau | 119 | 0.35 | – |
| L'Union fait la force | Dominique Dubois-Massey | 74 | 0.22 | – |
| Total valid votes | | 33,675 | 98.52 | – |
| Total rejected ballots | | 505 | 1.48 | -0.37 |
| Turnout | | 34,180 | 69.48 | -1.62 |
| Electors on the lists | | 49,195 | – | – |
| Coalition Avenir Québec hold | | Swing | | +0.80 |

2018 Quebec general election: Deux-Montagnes
| Party | Candidate | Votes | % | ±% |
|---|---|---|---|---|
| Coalition Avenir Québec | Benoit Charette | 16,038 | 47.44 | +13.28 |
| Parti Québécois | Daniel Goyer | 6,464 | 19.12 | -12.85 |
| Québec solidaire | Audrey Lesage-Lanthier | 4,912 | 14.53 | +7.84 |
| Liberal | Fabienne Fatou Diop | 4,523 | 13.38 | -12.27 |
| Green | Isabelle Dagenais | 722 | 2.14 | |
| Conservative | Delia Fodor | 368 | 1.09 | |
| Citoyens au pouvoir | Denis Paré | 322 | 0.95 | |
| Parti libre | Martin Brulé | 253 | 0.75 | |
| Bloc Pot | Hans Roker Jr | 152 | 0.45 | |
| CINQ | Eric Emond | 52 | 0.15 | |
| Total valid votes | | 33,806 | 98.15 | |
| Total rejected ballots | | 636 | 1.85 | |
| Turnout | | 34,442 | 71.10 | |
| Eligible voters | | 48,440 | | |
| Coalition Avenir Québec hold | | Swing | | +13.07 |
Source(s) "Rapport des résultats officiels du scrutin". Élections Québec.

2014 Quebec general election
| Party | Candidate | Votes | % | ±% |
|---|---|---|---|---|
| Coalition Avenir Québec | Benoit Charette | 11,868 | 34.16 | -1.09 |
| Parti Québécois | Daniel Goyer | 11,107 | 31.97 | -6.83 |
| Liberal | Luc Leclerc | 8,913 | 25.65 | +7.66 |
| Québec solidaire | Duncan Hart Cameron | 2,326 | 6.69 | +2.6 |
| Parti équitable | Alec Ware | 297 | 0.85 | |
| Option nationale | Louis-Félix Cauchon | 233 | 0.67 | -1.25 |
| Total valid votes | | 34,744 | 98.01 | – |
| Total rejected ballots | | 705 | 1.99 | – |
| Turnout | | 35,449 | 74 | |
| Electors on the lists | | 47,612 | – | – |

2012 Quebec general election
| Party | Candidate | Votes | % | ±% |
|---|---|---|---|---|
| Parti Québécois | Daniel Goyer | 14,423 | 38.80 | -4.33 |
| Coalition Avenir Québec | Benoit Charette | 13,102 | 35.25 | +17.25 |
| Liberal | Stéphanie Ménard | 6,689 | 17.99 | -14.38 |
| Québec solidaire | Normand Godon | 1,522 | 4.09 | +1.81 |
| Green | Princess Brooks | 724 | 1.95 | -2.27 |
| Option nationale | Wilson Ortiz | 712 | 1.92 | |
| Total valid votes | | 37,172 | 98.56 | – |
| Total rejected ballots | | 545 | 1.44 | – |
| Turnout | | 37,717 | 79.99 | |
| Electors on the lists | | 47,154 | – | – |
| Parti Québécois hold | | Swing | | -10.79 |

^ Change is from redistributed results. CAQ change is from ADQ.

2008 Quebec general election
| Party | Candidate | Votes | % | ±% |
|---|---|---|---|---|
| Parti Québécois | Benoit Charette | 11,961 | 43.14 | +10.13 |
| Liberal | Marie-France D'Aoust | 8,980 | 32.39 | +8.45 |
| Action démocratique | Lucie Leblanc | 4,986 | 17.98 | -18.34 |
| Green | Guy Rainville | 1,168 | 4.21 | -0.03 |
| Québec solidaire | Julien Demers | 632 | 2.28 | +0.12 |
| Total valid votes | | 27,727 | 98.11 | – |
| Total rejected ballots | | 535 | 1.89 | – |
