= Laurin Liu =

Canadian politician (born 1990)

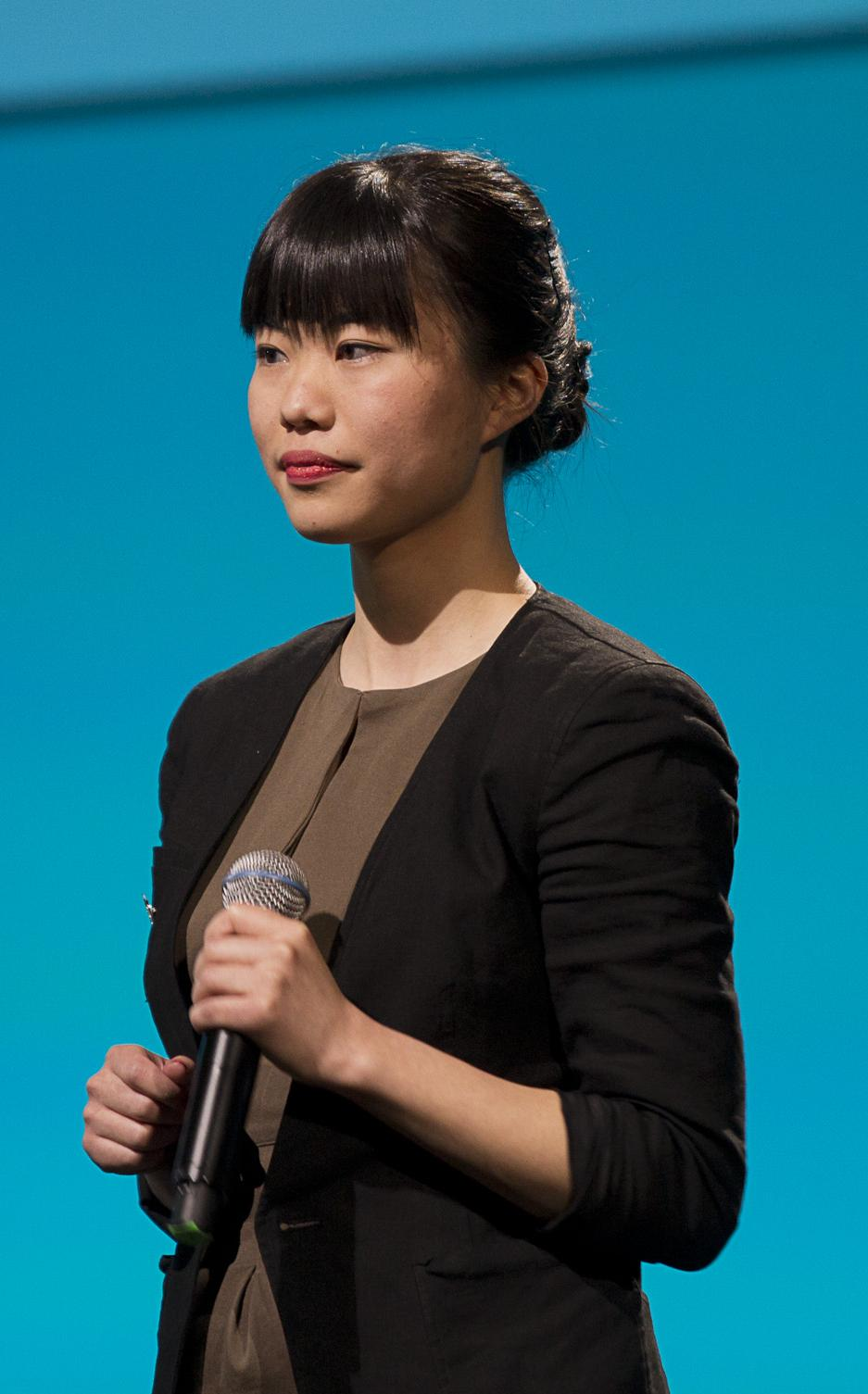
- Liu in 2013

Member of Parliament for Rivière-des-Mille-Îles
- In office May 2, 2011 – October 19, 2015
- Preceded by: Luc Desnoyers
- Succeeded by: Linda Lapointe

Personal details
- Born: November 13, 1990 (age 36) Calgary, Alberta, Canada
- Party: New Democratic Party
- Profession: Journalist, student

Laurin Liu (traditional Chinese: 劉舒雲; simplified Chinese: 刘舒云; Jyutping: Lau4 Syu1 Wan4, born November 13, 1990) is a Canadian politician who was elected to the House of Commons of Canada in the 2011 federal election. She represented the electoral district of Rivière-des-Mille-Îles as a member of the New Democratic Party (NDP) from 2011 to 2015. Born in Calgary in 1990, she was the youngest female Member of Parliament in Canadian history.

She was one of five candidates, alongside Mylène Freeman, Matthew Dubé, Charmaine Borg and Jamie Nicholls, who were McGill University students when elected in the 2011 election following the NDP's unexpected mid-campaign surge in Quebec. In the 2015 election, all were defeated with the exception of Dubé. At the time of her election in 2011, she was pursuing a double major in History and Cultural Studies.

== Early life ==
Liu was raised in Pointe-Claire, Quebec. Prior to attending McGill, she was a student at Royal West Academy and Collège Jean-de-Brébeuf. At Jean-de-Brébeuf, she became politically active by founding the NDP campus club. She later moved on to be co-president of the youth wing of the Quebec section of the NDP.

She was active on campus as a board member of CKUT radio, a representative to the CKUT Programming Committee, an employee of McGill University's undergraduate student union, and a staff member of the McGill Daily.

Liu, whose parents came to Canada from Guangzhou in the 1980s, is fluent in French, English, and Cantonese.

== MP for Rivière-des-Mille-Îles ==
Liu had not expected to win, and spent most of the campaign helping NDP Quebec lieutenant Tom Mulcair win reelection. She was working in a polling station in Mulcair's Outremont riding as an NDP scrutineer when a friend texted her that she was leading Bloc Québécois incumbent Luc Desnoyers.

Ultimately, she defeated Desnoyers by an 11,000-vote margin. By comparison, no NDP candidate had finished higher than fourth since the riding's creation in 1997; nor had any previous NDP challenger managed to garner the 10% necessary for their expenses to be refunded. At the age of 20 years, 196 days, Liu became the youngest woman in Canadian history to be elected to Parliament. She was the second-youngest MP in the 41st Canadian Parliament, after Pierre-Luc Dusseault.

=== In Parliament ===
Liu was named deputy critic for the environment. In this capacity, she represented the NDP at the December 2011 conference on climate change in Durban, South Africa, where she denounced the Conservative government's environmental policies.

In the 2012 NDP leadership race following the death of Jack Layton, Liu supported Peggy Nash.

Following the accession of Tom Mulcair as party leader, Liu was named deputy critic for science and technology. She spoke out numerous times in the House of Commons against the "muzzling" of federal scientists by the Conservative government. On June 10, 2012, Liu attended the "Death of Evidence" march on Parliament Hill which was led by groups of scientists following the elimination of the long-form census, the closure of the world-renowned Experimental Lakes Area as well as other cuts to environmental and scientific agencies contained in the Conservative Omnibus Bill C-38. In 2015, she was also named deputy critic for industry.

She advocated for parliamentary reform. On March 15, 2012, Liu tabled a bill to ensure that low-income seniors eligible for the Guaranteed Income Supplement would receive the retirement income top-up without having to apply. On May 29, 2014, Liu tabled a bill aimed at protecting homeowners from excessive bank penalties for mortgage prepayment. On June 16, 2014, Liu tabled The Intern Protection Act, which was seconded by fellow NDP MP Andrew Cash. This bill sought to provide protection for interns working in federally regulated industries. The bill was updated on November 25, 2014. Liu also tabled a motion for a national strategy on eating disorders.

=== 2015 election and aftermath ===
In the 2015 election, Liu lost her seat to Liberal Linda Lapointe. Soon afterward, Liu denounced photos of Lapointe wearing an "unacceptable" Halloween costume—an Asian hat and robe—stating, "It's 2015. It's unacceptable to dress up as another culture, on Halloween or any other day." Soon after, Lapointe deleted the photos from her Facebook account.

== Post-parliamentary career ==
After her defeat in the 2015 election, Liu completed a master's degree in human rights at the London School of Economics.

In 2026, Liu endorsed Rob Ashton in that year's federal NDP leadership race.

== Electoral record ==
=== Rivière-des-Mille-Îles ===
2015 Canadian federal election: Rivière-des-Mille-Îles
Party	Candidate	Votes	%	±%	Expenditures
Liberal	Linda Lapointe	18,787	32.37	+21.27	–
New Democratic	Laurin Liu	17,111	29.48	-19.64	–
Bloc Québécois	Félix Pinel	14,755	25.42	-1.70	–
Conservative	Érick Gauthier	6,099	10.51	+0.21	–
Green	Alec Ware	1,136	1.96	-0.41	–
Independent	Luis Quinteros	158	0.27	n/a	–
Total valid votes/Expense limit		58,046	100.00;		$216,995.77
Total rejected ballots		927	1.57	–	
Turnout		58,973	72.42	–	
Eligible voters		81,429			
Liberal gain from New Democratic		Swing		+20.45	
Source: Elections Canada

2011 Canadian federal election: Rivière-des-Mille-Îles
Party	Candidate	Votes	%	±%	Expenditures
New Democratic	Laurin Liu	25,639	49.2	+35.9	
Bloc Québécois	Luc Desnoyers	14,873	28.5	-16.8	
Liberal	Denis Joannette	5,300	10.2	-7.2	
Conservative	Lucie Leblanc	5,057	9.7	-9.8	
Green	Gilles Bisson	1,229	2.4	-1.8	
Total valid votes/Expense limit		52,098	100.0		
Total rejected ballots		973	1.8	–	
Turnout		53,071	66.8	–	
Eligible voters		79,428	–		
