= Jean-Paul L'Allier =

Canadian politician (1938–2016)

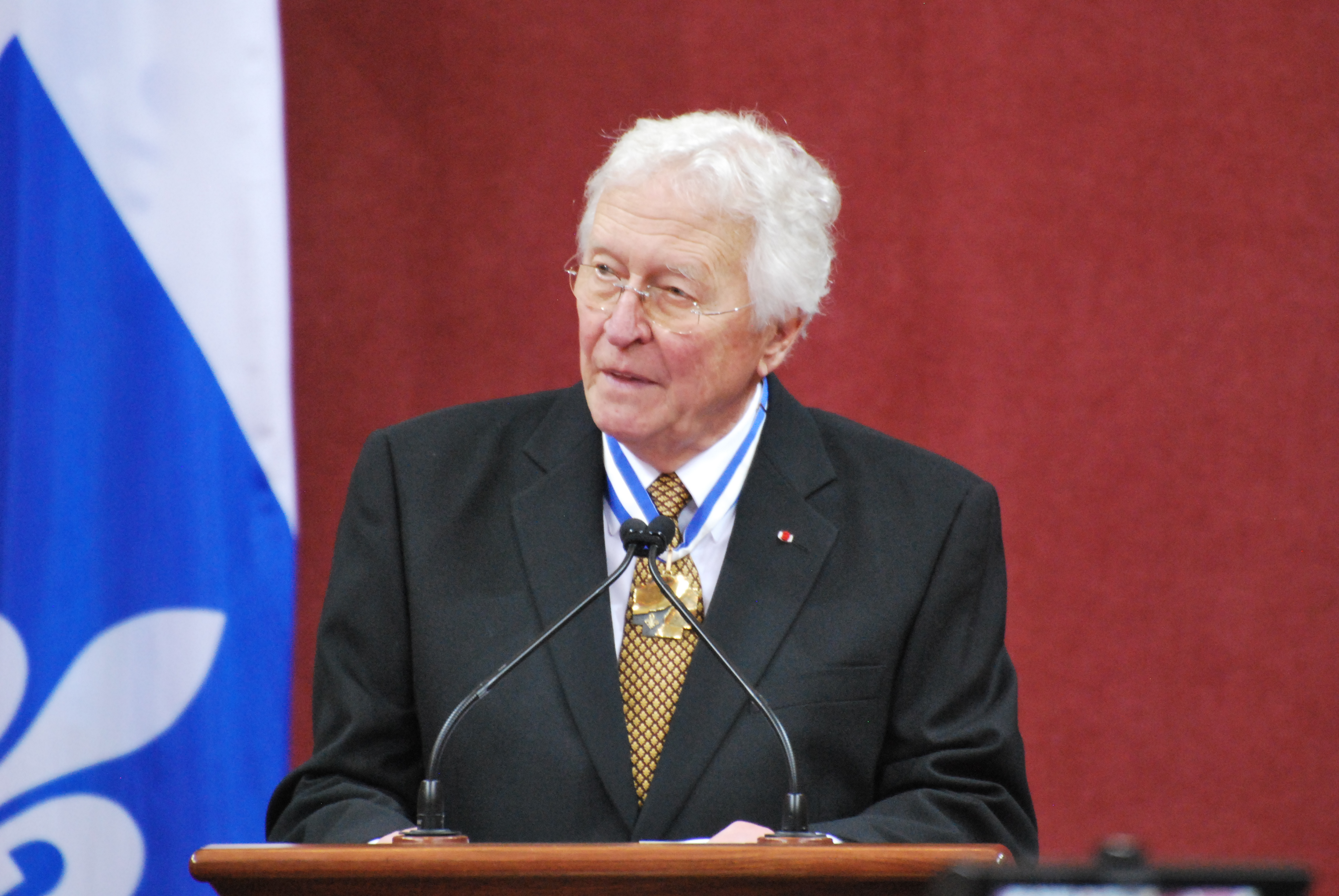
- Jean-Paul L'Allier in 2013

38th Mayor of Quebec City
- In office November 5, 1989 – November 19, 2005
- Preceded by: Jean Pelletier
- Succeeded by: Andrée Boucher

Member of the National Assembly of Quebec for Deux-Montagnes
- In office 1970–1976
- Preceded by: Gaston Binette
- Succeeded by: Pierre de Bellefeuille

Personal details
- Born: August 12, 1938 Hudson, Quebec, Canada
- Died: January 5, 2016 (aged 77) Hôtel-Dieu de Québec, Quebec City, Quebec, Canada
- Political party: Liberal

Jean-Paul L'Allier (French pronunciation: [ʒɑ̃pɔl lalje]; August 12, 1938 – January 5, 2016) was a Canadian politician, a two-term Member of the National Assembly of Quebec (MNA) and the 38th mayor of Quebec City from 1989 to 2005.

== Background ==
L'Allier was born in Hudson, Montérégie in 1938 and received a law degree from the University of Ottawa. He practised law in the Ottawa and Outaouais regions in the 1960s. He worked for the Montreal newspaper Le Devoir in the 1980s. He was a self-proclaimed Liberal, sovereigntist and social democrat.

== Member of the National Assembly ==
L'Allier became a candidate to the National Assembly of Quebec in the district of Deux-Montagnes after Liberal candidate and mayor Guy Léveillée of Saint-Eustache, Laurentides dropped out of the race in the 1970 election. He won the Liberal nomination against two other candidates and subsequently won the election. He was re-elected in the 1973 election.

== Cabinet member ==
L'Allier was appointed to the Cabinet in 1970 and served as Minister of Communications until 1975 and as Minister of Cultural Affairs from 1975 until 1976.

== Political defeat ==
L'Allier was defeated against Parti Québécois (PQ) candidate Pierre de Bellefeuille in the 1976 election. L'Allier voted "yes" in the 1980 Quebec referendum and left the Liberals in the same year.

== Mayor of Quebec City ==
L'Allier ran as the Rassemblement populaire candidate for Mayor of Quebec City in 1989. He won against Progrès civique de Québec candidate Jean-François Bertrand and was sworn in as the 38th Mayor of the city. He was re-elected in 1993 and 1997.

His accomplishments include:

- The revitalization of the Saint-Roch neighborhood;
- The erection of a monument that commemorates the 30th anniversary of French President Charles de Gaulle's official visit to Quebec City in 1967;
- The merger of the Quebec City government with twelve other surrounding municipalities, as a part of the municipal reorganization of 2001–02.

L'Ancienne-Lorette and Saint-Augustin-de-Desmaures eventually demerged.

L'Allier was a supporter of the arts in Quebec City, working to create public art installations, rebuild the city's cultural centre, and support arts education with efforts such as finding a home for Université Laval's école d'art. L'Allier co-founded the Renouveau municipal de Québec and was re-elected as mayor in 2001 against Action civique de Québec candidate and former anti-merger crusader Andrée Boucher. On July 13, 2004, he announced that he would not run for re-election in November 2005 and retired from politics.
