= Deux-Montagnes (provincial electoral district) =

Provincial electoral district in Quebec, Canada

Quebec electoral district
- Coordinates: 45.59°N 73.94°W

Provincial electoral district
- Legislature: National Assembly of Quebec
MNA
Linda Vaillant
Parti Québécois
- District created: 1867
- First contested: 1867
- Last contested: 2026

Demographics
- Population (2006): 59,464
- Electors (2018): 48,440
- Area (km²): 79.6
- Pop. density (per km²): 747
- Census division: Deux-Montagnes (part)
- Census subdivision(s): Deux-Montagnes, Saint-Eustache

Deux-Montagnes (French pronunciation: [dø mɔ̃taɲ]) is a provincial electoral district in Quebec, Canada, that elects members to the National Assembly of Quebec. It consists of the cities of Deux-Montagnes and Saint-Eustache.

It was created for the 1867 election (and an electoral district of that name existed earlier in the Legislative Assembly of the Province of Canada).

== Members of the Legislative Assembly / National Assembly ==
Legislature	Years	Member	Party
1st	1867–1871	Gédéon Ouimet	Conservative
2nd	1871–1875	Gédéon Ouimet	Conservative
3rd	1875–1876	Gédéon Ouimet	Conservative
3rd	1876–1878	Charles Champagne	Conservative
4th	1878–1881	Charles Champagne	Conservative
5th	1881–1882	Charles Champagne	Conservative
5th	1882–1886	Benjamin Beauchamp	Conservative
6th	1886–1890	Benjamin Beauchamp	Conservative Independent
7th	1890–1892	Benjamin Beauchamp	Conservative Independent
8th	1892–1897	Benjamin Beauchamp	Conservative Independent
9th	1897–1900	Hector Champagne	Liberal
10th	1900–1904	Hector Champagne	Liberal
11th	1904–1908	Hector Champagne	Liberal
12th	1908–1912	Arthur Sauvé	Conservative
13th	1912–1916	Arthur Sauvé	Conservative
14th	1916–1919	Arthur Sauvé	Conservative
15th	1919–1923	Arthur Sauvé	Conservative
16th	1923–1927	Arthur Sauvé	Conservative
17th	1927–1930	Arthur Sauvé	Conservative
17th	1930–1931	Paul Sauvé	Conservative
18th	1931–1935	Paul Sauvé	Conservative
19th	1935–1936	Jean-Léo Rochon	Liberal
20th	1936–1939	Paul Sauvé	Union Nationale
21st	1939–1944	Paul Sauvé	Union Nationale
22nd	1944–1948	Paul Sauvé	Union Nationale
23rd	1948–1952	Paul Sauvé	Union Nationale
24th	1952–1956	Paul Sauvé	Union Nationale
25th	1956–1960†	Paul Sauvé	Union Nationale
26th	1960–1962	Gaston Binette	Liberal
27th	1962–1966	Gaston Binette	Liberal
28th	1966–1970	Gaston Binette	Liberal
29th	1970–1973	Jean-Paul L'Allier	Liberal
30th	1973–1976	Jean-Paul L'Allier	Liberal
31st	1976–1981	Pierre de Bellefeuille	Parti Québécois
32nd	1981–1984	Pierre de Bellefeuille	Parti Québécois
32nd	1984–1985	Pierre de Bellefeuille	Independent
32nd	1985–1985	Pierre de Bellefeuille	Parti indépendantiste
33rd	1985–1989	Yolande Legault	Liberal
34th	1989–1994	Jean-Guy Bergeron	Liberal
35th	1994–1998	Hélène Robert	Parti Québécois
36th	1998–2003	Hélène Robert	Parti Québécois
37th	2003–2007	Hélène Robert	Parti Québécois
38th	2007–2008	Lucie Leblanc	Action démocratique
39th	2008–2011	Benoit Charette	Parti Québécois
39th	2011–2011	Benoit Charette	Independent
39th	2011–2012	Benoit Charette	Coalition Avenir Québec
40th	2012–2014	Daniel Goyer	Parti Québécois
41st	2014–2018	Benoit Charette	Coalition Avenir Québec
42nd	2018–2022	Benoit Charette	Coalition Avenir Québec
43rd	2022–2026	Benoit Charette	Coalition Avenir Québec
44th	2026–Present	Linda Vaillant	Parti Québécois

== Linguistic demographics ==
- Francophone: 89.7%
- Anglophone: 8.3%
- Allophone: 2%

== Electoral results ==
2026 Quebec general election
** Preliminary results — Not yet official **
Party	Candidate	Votes	%	±%
Parti Québécois	Linda Vaillant	12,575	36.42	+19.26
Liberal	Marc Allaire	7,717	22.35	+12.08
Conservative	Samuel Lévesque	5,194	15.04	+5.22
Coalition Avenir Québec	Christine Maestracci	4,966	14.38	–32.70
Québec solidaire	Guillaume Ducharme	3,836	11.11	–3.04
Climat Québec	Nicolas Riqueur-Lainé	244	0.71	+0.36
Total valid votes		34,532	98.10	–0.42
Total rejected ballots		670	1.90	+0.42
Turnout		35,202	69.60	+0.12
Electors on the lists		50,574		
Parti Québécois gain from Coalition Avenir Québec		Swing		+3.59
Source: Élections Québec

2022 Quebec general election
Party	Candidate	Votes	%	±%
Coalition Avenir Québec	Benoît Charette	15,854	47.08	-0.36
Parti Québécois	Guillaume Lalonde	5,777	17.16	-1.97
Québec solidaire	Olivier Côté	4,766	14.15	-0.38
Liberal	Marc Allaire	3,460	10.27	-3.10
Conservative	Isabelle Baril	3,308	9.82	+8.73
Green	Amavi Tagodoe	317	0.94	-1.19
Climat Québec	Hélèna Courteau	119	0.35	–
L'Union fait la force	Dominique Dubois-Massey	74	0.22	–
Total valid votes		33,675	98.52	–
Total rejected ballots		505	1.48	-0.37
Turnout		34,180	69.48	-1.62
Electors on the lists		49,195	–	–
Coalition Avenir Québec hold		Swing		+0.80

2018 Quebec general election
Party	Candidate	Votes	%	±%
Coalition Avenir Québec	Benoit Charette	16,038	47.44	+13.28
Parti Québécois	Daniel Goyer	6,464	19.12	-12.85
Québec solidaire	Audrey Lesage-Lanthier	4,912	14.53	+7.84
Liberal	Fabienne Fatou Diop	4,523	13.38	-12.27
Green	Isabelle Dagenais	722	2.14	
Conservative	Delia Fodor	368	1.09	
Citoyens au pouvoir	Denis Paré	322	0.95	
Parti libre	Martin Brulé	253	0.75	
Bloc Pot	Hans Roker Jr	152	0.45	
CINQ	Eric Emond	52	0.15	
Total valid votes		33,806	98.15	
Total rejected ballots		636	1.85	
Turnout		34,442	71.10	
Eligible voters		48,440		
Coalition Avenir Québec hold		Swing		+13.07
Source(s) "Rapport des résultats officiels du scrutin". Élections Québec.

2014 Quebec general election
Party	Candidate	Votes	%	±%
Coalition Avenir Québec	Benoit Charette	11,868	34.16	-1.09
Parti Québécois	Daniel Goyer	11,107	31.97	-6.83
Liberal	Luc Leclerc	8,913	25.65	+7.66
Québec solidaire	Duncan Hart Cameron	2,326	6.69	+2.6
Parti équitable	Alec Ware	297	0.85	
Option nationale	Louis-Félix Cauchon	233	0.67	-1.25
Total valid votes		34,744	98.01	–
Total rejected ballots		705	1.99	–
Turnout		35,449	74	
Electors on the lists		47,612	–	–

2012 Quebec general election
Party	Candidate	Votes	%	±%
Parti Québécois	Daniel Goyer	14,423	38.80	-4.33
Coalition Avenir Québec	Benoit Charette	13,102	35.25	+17.25
Liberal	Stéphanie Ménard	6,689	17.99	-14.38
Québec solidaire	Normand Godon	1,522	4.09	+1.81
Green	Princess Brooks	724	1.95	-2.27
Option nationale	Wilson Ortiz	712	1.92	
Total valid votes		37,172	98.56	–
Total rejected ballots		545	1.44	–
Turnout		37,717	79.99	
Electors on the lists		47,154	–	–
Parti Québécois hold		Swing		-10.79

^ Change is from redistributed results. CAQ change is from ADQ.

2008 Quebec general election
Party	Candidate	Votes	%	±%
Parti Québécois	Benoit Charette	11,961	43.14	+10.13
Liberal	Marie-France D'Aoust	8,980	32.39	+8.45
Action démocratique	Lucie Leblanc	4,986	17.98	-18.34
Green	Guy Rainville	1,168	4.21	-0.03
Québec solidaire	Julien Demers	632	2.28	+0.12
Total valid votes		27,727	98.11	–
Total rejected ballots		535	1.89	–

2007 Quebec general election
Party	Candidate	Votes	%	±%
Action démocratique	Lucie Leblanc	12,415	36.32	+14.63
Parti Québécois	Daniel Goyer	11,283	33.01	-6.03
Liberal	Paule Fortier	8,183	23.94	-14.05
Green	Guy Rainville	1,448	4.24	-
Québec solidaire	Julien Demers	740	2.16	+0.88
Independent	Manon Bissonnette	114	0.33	-

QS vote compared to UFP vote 2003

2003 Quebec general election
Party	Candidate	Votes	%	±%
Parti Québécois	Hélène Robert	12,432	39.04	-7.99
Liberal	Marc Lauzon	12,099	37.99	+7.02
Action démocratique	Éric Duhaime	6,907	21.69	+0.95
UFP	Julien Demers	408	1.28	+0.98 (Note: Results taken from Socialist Democracy.)
Total valid votes		31,846	98.28	–
Total rejected ballots		557	1.72	+0.58
Turnout		32,403	74.37	-2.92
Electors on the lists		43,571	–	–

1998 Quebec general election
Party	Candidate	Votes	%
Parti Québécois	Hélène Robert	21,831	47.03
Liberal	Robert Fragasso	14,378	30.97
Action démocratique	Jacques Hébert	9,628	20.74
Bloc Pot	Marc-André Roy	324	0.70
Socialist Democracy	Luc Charlebois	141	0.30
Equality	Ovid da Silva	121	0.26
Total valid votes		46,423	100.00
Rejected and declined votes		529	
Turnout		46,952	81.08
Electors on the lists		57,907	

1995 Quebec referendum
Side	Votes	%
Oui	29,831	58.94
Non	20,780	41.06

1994 Quebec general election
Party		Candidate	Votes	%
	Parti Québécois	Hélène Robert	20,742	48.34
	Liberal	Francine Labelle	15,053	35.08
	Action démocratique	Sylvie Allaire	6,523	15.20
}	Development	Georges Robert	305	0.71
	Natural Law	Alain Gerard Antinori	286	0.67
Total valid votes			42,909	100.00
Rejected and declined votes			932	
Turnout			43,841	83.28
Electors on the lists			52,644	

1989 Quebec general election
Party	Candidate	Votes	%
Liberal	Jean-Guy Bergeron	15,656	46.48
Parti Québécois	Hélène Robert	15,141	44.95
Equality	Rudolf Neumayer	2,449	7.27
United Social Credit	Georges Vaudrin	435	1.29
Total valid votes		33,681	100.00
Rejected and declined votes		1,061	
Turnout		34,742	75.98
Electors on the lists		45,723	

== See also ==
- List of Quebec provincial electoral districts
- Canadian provincial electoral districts
