= James Hughes (Canadian politician) =

Canadian politician

James Hughes MNA

Member of the National Assembly for Vaudreuil
- Incumbent
- Assumed office October 5, 2026
- Preceded by: Marie-Claude Nichols

Personal details
- Party: Liberal

James Hughes is a Canadian politician who is a candidate for the National Assembly of Quebec for Vaudreuil in the 2026 Quebec general election as a member of the Quebec Liberal Party.

== Electoral record ==
2026 Quebec general election: Vaudreuil
** Preliminary results — Not yet official **
Party	Candidate	Votes	%	±%
Liberal	James Hughes	18,783	46.75	
Parti Québécois	Meili Faille	7,980	19.86	
Conservative	Patrick Caron	5,715	14.22	
Coalition Avenir Québec	Chantal Darcy	4,263	10.61	
Québec solidaire	Jeannette Uwantege	2,927	7.29	
Green	Carole Thériault	509	1.27	
Total valid votes				
Total rejected ballots				
Turnout			65.05	
Electors on the lists			–	–
Liberal hold		Swing		
Source: Élections Québec

2015 Canadian federal election
Party	Candidate	Votes	%	±%	Expenditures
Liberal	Marc Garneau	29,755	57.67	+19.43	$116,633.55
New Democratic	James Hughes	11,229	21.76	-13.29	$121,985.65
Conservative	Richard Sagala	7,414	14.37	-3.28	$23,826.12
Green	Melissa Kate Wheeler	1,581	3.06	-1.32	$1,243.50
Bloc Québécois	Simon Quesnel	1,282	2.48	-1.58	$2,358.94
Marxist–Leninist	Rachel Hoffman	181	0.35	–	–
Independent	Lisa Julie Cahn	151	0.29	–	–
Total valid votes/Expense limit		51,593	99.40	–	$214,383.86
Total rejected ballots		311	0.60	–	–
Turnout		51,904	65.02	–	–
Eligible voters		79,832	–	–	–
Source: Elections Canada
