= Benjamin Beauchamp =

Canadian politician

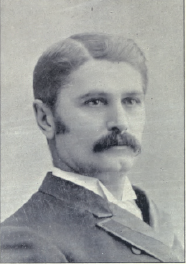

Member of the Legislative Assembly of Quebec for Deux-Montagnes
- In office 1882–1897
- Preceded by: Charles Champagne
- Succeeded by: Hector Champagne

Personal details
- Born: 21 December 1842 Saint-Hermas, Canada East
- Died: 3 March 1913 (aged 70) Saint-Hermas, Quebec
- Party: Conservative

Benjamin Beauchamp (21 December 1842 – 3 March 1913) was a Canadian politician.

Born in Saint-Hermas, Canada East, the son of Benjamin Beauchamp and Marie Meloche, Beauchamp was educated at Jacques-Cartier Normal School in Montreal receiving a first-class teachers' certificate. He obtained both classes of certificates at the School of Military Instruction in 1865. An agriculturist, he was secretary of the Agricultural Society of Deux-Montagnes, Quebec.

He was a member of the 5th, 6th, 7th, and 8th Legislative Assembly of Quebec for Deux-Montagnes.
