= Marie-Claude Nichols =

Canadian politician

Member of the National Assembly of Quebec for Vaudreuil
- In office April 7, 2014 – August 27, 2026
- Preceded by: Yvon Marcoux
- Succeeded by: James Hughes

Mayor of Notre-Dame-de-l'Île-Perrot
- In office November 1, 2009 – April 7, 2014
- Preceded by: Serge Roy
- Succeeded by: Danie Deschênes

Personal details
- Born: December 5, 1973 (age 52) Terrebonne, Quebec, Canada
- Party: Quebec Liberal (2014-2022) (2025-present)
- Other political affiliations: Independent (2022-2025) Option Citoyens (2009-2014)

Marie-Claude Nichols (born December 5, 1973) is a Canadian politician born in Terrebonne, Quebec, who served as a member of the National Assembly of Quebec for Vaudreuil from 2014 to 2026.

== Political career ==
Nichols was elected mayor of Notre-Dame-de-l'Île-Perrot in 2009 unseating incumbent mayor Serge Roy. She was re-elected unopposed in the 2013 election. She was mayor of the Montreal suburb for nearly 5 years. She also served as the Warden of the Vaudreuil-Soulanges Regional County Municipality from 2013 to 2014.

Nichols was elected to the National Assembly of Quebec in the 2014 election. She represents the electoral district of Vaudreuil.

She was re-elected MNA for Vaudreuil in 2018 despite a historic defeat for her party. However, her majority declined considerably, from 20,512 votes to 2,765. She was re-elected in the 2022 election, by a slim 576 vote margin.

On May 19, 2026, she was again confirmed as the Liberal candidate in Vaudreuil. However, on August 4, 2026, she announced that she would not be seeking reelection and stepping down due familial circumstances; making her the only Liberal MNA not seeking reelection in 2026. James Hughes replaced her as the Liberal candidate in Vaudreuil.

== Expulsion from Liberal Party ==
Shortly after being elected as a Liberal in 2022, she was expelled from caucus by party leader Dominique Anglade on October 27, 2022, for refusing the transport critic role. After her expulsion, she announced she would sit as an independent. On May 2, 2025, she formally endorsed Pablo Rodriguez for the 2025 Quebec Liberal leadership. Shortly after Rodriguez's win, she formally rejoined the Liberal caucus on June 19, 2025, after two and a half years sitting as an independent.

== Electoral record ==
=== Provincial ===
2022 Quebec general election: Vaudreuil
Party	Candidate	Votes	%	±%
Liberal	Marie-Claude Nichols	13,608	34.22	-5.70
Coalition Avenir Québec	Eve Bélec	13,032	32.77	+0.14
Conservative	Eve Théoret	4,619	11.62	+9.92
Québec solidaire	Cynthia Bilodeau	3,671	9.23	-0.82
Parti Québécois	Christopher Massé	3,061	7.70	-2.35
Canadian	David Hamelin-Schuilenburg	726	1.83	–
Green	Kelley Boileau	496	1.25	-1.45
Bloc Montreal	Jaspal Singh Ahluwalia	477	1.20	–
Démocratie directe	Paul Lynes	75	0.19	–
Total valid votes		39,765	98.97	
Total rejected ballots		415	1.03	
Turnout		40,180	65.19	-0.51
Electors on the lists		61,632		
Liberal hold		Swing		–

2018 Quebec general election: Vaudreuil
Party	Candidate	Votes	%	±%
Liberal	Marie-Claude Nichols	15,143	39.92	-21.27
Coalition Avenir Québec	Claude Bourbonnais	12,378	32.63	+17.01
Parti Québécois	Philip Lapalme	3,813	10.05	-5.91
Québec solidaire	Igor Erchov	3,811	10.05	+5.41
Green	Jason Mossa	1,026	2.70	+1.42
Conservative	Ryan Robertson	644	1.70	+1.27
New Democratic	Ryan Young	568	1.50	
Citoyens au pouvoir	Daniel Pilon	343	0.90	
Bloc Pot	Camille Piché-Jetté	206	0.54	
Total valid votes		37,932	98.68	
Total rejected ballots		508	1.32	+0.17
Turnout		38,440	65.70	-12.29
Eligible voters		58,504		
Liberal hold		Swing		-19.14
Source(s) "Rapport des résultats officiels du scrutin". Élections Québec.

2014 Quebec general election
Party	Candidate	Votes	%	±%
Liberal	Marie-Claude Nichols	27,750	61.19	+16.12
Parti Québécois	Marcos Archambault	7,238	15.96	-4.75
Coalition Avenir Québec	Luc Tison	7,084	15.62	-10.00
Québec solidaire	David Fortin Côté	2,101	4.63	-0.25
Green	Thomas Radcliffe	584	1.29	-1.19
Conservative	Michel Paul	196	0.43	–
Parti équitable	Julien Leclerc	190	0.42	–
Option nationale	Jean-Gabriel Cauchon	115	0.25	-0.78
Mon pays le Québec	Léon Dupré	90	0.20	–
Total valid votes		45,348	98.95	–
Total rejected ballots		528	1.15	–
Turnout		45,876	77.99	+1.56
Electors on the lists		58,822	–	–

=== Municipal Notre-Dame-de-l'Île-Perrot ===
2013 Mayoral Election

Party	Mayoral Candidate	Vote	%
Option citoyens	Marie-Claude Nichols (incumbent)	acclaimed	

2009 Mayoral Election

Parties	Mayoral Candidates	Vote	%
Options Citoyens	Marie-Claude Beaulieu-Nichols	1 938	52.1
Independent	Richard Mainville	935	25.1
Ralliement Notre-Dame-de-l'Île-Perrot	Serge Roy (incumbent)	848	22.8
Turnout: 52.1%
