= Linda Vaillant =

Linda Vaillant MNA

Member of the National Assembly for Deux-Montagnes
- Incumbent
- Assumed office October 5, 2026
- Preceded by: Benoit Charette

Personal details
- Party: Parti Québécois

Linda Vaillant is a Canadian politician who is a candidate for the National Assembly of Quebec for Deux-Montagnes in the 2026 Quebec general election as a member of the Parti Québécois.

Vaillant is a pharmacist, and was an oncology coordinator at the Royal Victoria Hospital as well as head of the pharmacy department at the Montreal Heart Institute.
