= Linda Lapointe =

Canadian politician (born 1960)

Linda Lapointe MP
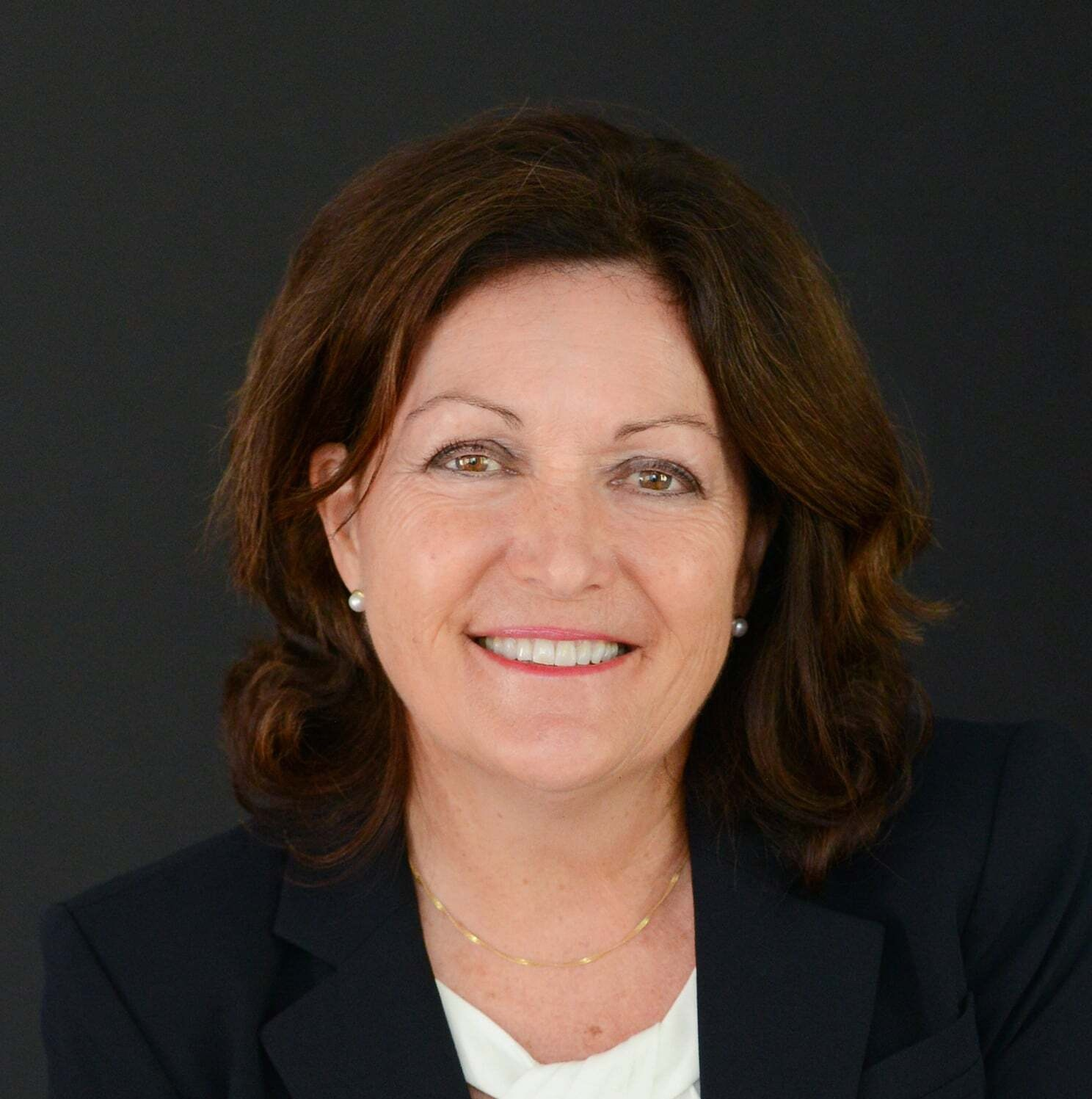
- Lapointe in 2025

Deputy Government Whip
- In office August 31, 2018 – September 11, 2019
- Prime Minister: Justin Trudeau
- Preceded by: Filomena Tassi
- Succeeded by: Ginette Petitpas Taylor

Member of Parliament for Rivière-des-Mille-Îles
- Incumbent
- Assumed office April 28, 2025
- Preceded by: Luc Desilets
- In office October 19, 2015 – September 11, 2019
- Preceded by: Laurin Liu
- Succeeded by: Luc Desilets

Member of the National Assembly of Quebec for Groulx
- In office April 25, 2007 – November 5, 2008
- Preceded by: Pierre Descoteaux
- Succeeded by: René Gauvreau

Personal details
- Born: July 2, 1960 (age 66) Laval, Quebec, Canada
- Party: Liberal Party of Canada
- Other political affiliations: Quebec Liberal Party; Action démocratique du Québec

Linda Lapointe is a Canadian politician and businesswoman from Quebec. She has been the Member of Parliament for the riding of Rivière-des-Mille-Îles since the 2025 Canadian Federal Election, serving as a member of the Liberal Party of Canada. Before this, she was an Action démocratique du Québec (ADQ) Member of the National Assembly for the electoral district of Groulx from 2007 to 2008. She previously served as Member of Parliament for the same district, having first been elected in 2015, and sat until the 2019 Canadian federal election when she lost her seat. She was elected for a second term on April 28, 2025, in the same riding.

== Biography ==
Lapointe has a college diploma in health sciences from the CEGEP Ahuntsic. In 1986, she received a bachelor's degree in business administration from the Université de Montréal. She worked at her Father’s grocery store, Provigo Lapointe et Fille, starting in her teenage years, serving as store manager from 1988 to 1997 and as owner from 1997 until selling the store in 2006.

== Community involvement ==
In addition to her career as a manager, Lapointe was treasurer and member of the Board of the Association des détaillants en alimentation du Québec (Quebec food retailers association) from 2002 to 2006. In 2013, this association has appointed her as a member of its Hall of Fame. In her community, she was president for the Regrouprement des gens d'affaires of Boisbriand from 2009 to 2015. For most of her adult life, she has been actively involved in her community, notably as organizer of Déjeuner de partage.

== Political career ==
Lapointe was first elected to the National Assembly of Quebec in the 2007 election as a member of Action démocratique du Québec in the riding of Groulx. Lapointe took office on April 12, 2007 and was named the critic for economic development and the Montreal region until 2008. She was also the assistant whip of the official opposition party.

Lapointe was defeated in the 2008 election.

She changed parties and ran for the Quebec Liberal Party in the 2012 Quebec general election and was again defeated.

After running again as MP in 2025 and winning as of April 28, 2025, she became president of the Liberal Women’s caucus. She is also an active member of two committees, being the international commerce committee as well as the ethics, deontology and access to information. She was elected as the vice-chair of the Canadian House of Commons Standing Committee on Access to Information, Privacy and Ethics in the 45th Canadian Parliament.

=== MP for the 42nd Canadian Parliament ===
On October 15, 2015, she was elected on the 2015 federal election as a member of the Liberal Party of Canada for the riding of Rivière-des-Mille-Îles. She defeated NDP incumbent Laurin Liu. Shortly after her election Lapointe posted photos on her Facebook page depicting her dressed in a Halloween costume—an Asian hat and robe—which was criticized for cultural appropriation and stereotyping Chinese culture. Lapointe later apologized and removed the photos from Facebook. She was selected by Prime Minister Trudeau's cabinet to sit on two House of Commons parliamentary committees: Standing Committee of Official Languages and Standing Committee on International Trade.

==== Canadian House of Commons Standing Committee of Official Languages ====
As a member of this committee, she studied the Government of Canada programs designed to promote francophone immigration to francophone minority communities in Canada, to establish a new Roadmap for Canada's Linguistic Duality (2008-2013) in partnership with the Minister of Canadian Heritage, Mélanie Joly. Her responsibilities also included studying Air Canada's bilingual service and studying access to justice in both languages.

==== Canadian House of Commons Standing Committee on International Trade ====
As a member of this committee, she, with the other members, directed studies and reports on various aspects of Canada’s international trade policy, such as the Softwood Lumber Agreement between Canada et United States of America, the Transpacific Partnership, and the EU-Canada Comprehensive Economic and Trade Agreement (CETA).

==== Private Member's Bill C-236 ====
She introduced a private member's bill on the credit card acceptance fees on February 25, 2016 to members of the House of Commons. The bill was named An act to amend the Payment card Networks act.

== Electoral record ==
=== Federal ===
2025 Canadian federal election: Rivière-des-Mille-Îles
| Party | Candidate | Votes | % | ±% | Expenditures |
|---|---|---|---|---|---|
| Liberal | Linda Lapointe | 27,218 | 45.63 | +10.27 | $74,940.63 |
| Bloc Québécois | Luc Desilets | 19,669 | 32.84 | –7.70 | $27,036.09 |
| Conservative | Elia Lopez | 10,398 | 17.36 | +7.11 | $15,000.17 |
| New Democratic | Joseph Hakizimana | 1,270 | 2.12 | –5.08 | $0.00 |
| Green | Alec Ware | 734 | 1.23 | –0.51 | $0.00 |
| People's | David Santamaria Quiceno | 306 | 0.51 | –2.24 | $0.00 |
| Independent | Michel Genois | 184 | 0.31 | N/A | $3,129.29 |
| Total valid votes | | 59,887 | 98.58 | +0.54 | $130,777.41 |
| Total rejected ballots | | 862 | 1.42 | –0.54 | |
| Turnout | | 60,749 | 71.80 | +6.34 | |
| Eligible voters | | 84,606 | | | |
| Liberal notional gain from Bloc Québécois | | Swing | | +8.98 | |
Source: Elections Canada

2021 Canadian federal election: Rivière-des-Mille-Îles
| Party | Candidate | Votes | % | ±% | Expenditures |
|---|---|---|---|---|---|
| Bloc Québécois | Luc Desilets | 21,645 | 40.6 | ±0.0 | $17,235.31 |
| Liberal | Linda Lapointe | 18,835 | 35.3 | -0.8 | $63,876.62 |
| Conservative | Marc Duffy-Vincelette | 5,479 | 10.3 | +2.2 | $9,189.50 |
| New Democratic | Joseph Hakizimana | 3,852 | 7.2 | -1.4 | $24.86 |
| People's | Hans Roker Jr. | 1,468 | 2.8 | +1.3 | $0.00 |
| Green | Alex Ware | 972 | 1.8 | -3.4 | $0.00 |
| Free | Valérie Beauséjour | 847 | 1.6 | N/A | $0.00 |
| Patriote | Michael Dionne | 149 | 0.3 | N/A | $0.00 |
| Indépendance du Québec | Julius Bute | 119 | 0.2 | N/A | $0.00 |
| Total valid votes/expense limit | | 53,366 | 98.1 | – | $113,035.56 |
| Total rejected ballots | | 1,061 | 1.9 | | |
| Turnout | | 54,427 | 65.4 | | |
| Eligible voters | | 83,171 | | | |
| Bloc Québécois hold | | Swing | | +0.4 | |
Source: Elections Canada

2019 Canadian federal election: Rivière-des-Mille-Îles
| Party | Candidate | Votes | % | ±% | Expenditures |
|---|---|---|---|---|---|
| Bloc Québécois | Luc Desilets | 23,629 | 40.61 | +15.19 | $9,764.52 |
| Liberal | Linda Lapointe | 21,009 | 36.11 | +3.74 | none listed |
| New Democratic | Joseph Hakizimana | 5,002 | 8.60 | -20.88 | $19,322.13 |
| Conservative | Maikel Mikhael | 4,684 | 8.05 | -2.46 | $20,256.23 |
| Green | Ceylan Borgers | 3,015 | 5.18 | +3.22 | none listed |
| People's | Hans Roker Jr. | 845 | 1.45 | – | $1,000.00 |
| Total valid votes/expense limit | | 58,184 | 98.16 | | |
| Total rejected ballots | | 1,090 | 1.84 | +0.27 | |
| Turnout | | 59,274 | 71.96 | -0.38 | |
| Eligible voters | | 82,372 | | | |
| Bloc Québécois gain from Liberal | | Swing | | +5.72 | |
Source: Elections Canada

2015 Canadian federal election
| Party | Candidate | Votes | % | ±% | Expenditures |
|---|---|---|---|---|---|
| Liberal | Linda Lapointe | 18,787 | 32.37 | +21.27 | $24,179.08 |
| New Democratic | Laurin Liu | 17,111 | 29.48 | -19.64 | $54,641.76 |
| Bloc Québécois | Félix Pinel | 14,755 | 25.42 | -1.70 | $40,335.73 |
| Conservative | Érick Gauthier | 6,099 | 10.51 | +0.21 | $31,082.28 |
| Green | Alec Ware | 1,136 | 1.96 | -0.41 | $665.90 |
| Independent | Luis Quinteros | 158 | 0.27 | n/a | – |
| Total valid votes/Expense limit | | 58,046 | 100.00 | | $217,630.75 |
| Total rejected ballots | | 927 | 1.57 | – | |
| Turnout | | 58,973 | 72.42 | – | |
| Eligible voters | | 81,429 | | | |
| Liberal gain from New Democratic | | Swing | | +20.45 | |
Source: Elections Canada

=== Provincial ===
2012 Quebec general election
| Party | Candidate | Votes | % | ±% |
|---|---|---|---|---|
| Coalition Avenir Québec | Hélène Daneault | 16,711 | 38.02 | +17.57 |
| Parti Québécois | Raymond Archambault | 14,948 | 34.01 | -4.05 |
| Liberal | Linda Lapointe | 8,776 | 19.97 | -15.70 |
| Québec solidaire | Sylvie Giguère | 1,892 | 4.30 | +1.92 |
| Option nationale | Alain Marginean | 895 | 2.04 | – |
| Green | Alec Ware | 591 | 1.34 | -1.80 |
| Independent | Alex Munteanu | 140 | 0.32 | – |
| Total valid votes | | 43,953 | 98.85 | – |
| Total rejected ballots | | 511 | 1.15 | – |
| Turnout | | 44,464 | 79.08 | |
| Electors on the lists | | 56,228 | – | – |
| Coalition Avenir Québec gain from Parti Québécois | | Swing | | +10.81 |

^ Change is from redistributed results. CAQ change is from ADQ.

2008 Quebec general election
| Party | Candidate | Votes | % | ±% |
|---|---|---|---|---|
| Parti Québécois | René Gauvreau | 11,226 | 37.62 | +8.73 |
| Liberal | Monique Laurin | 10,823 | 36.27 | +9.07 |
| Action démocratique | Linda Lapointe | 6,036 | 20.23 | -17.22 |
| Green | Carmen Brisebois | 955 | 3.20 | -0.93 |
| Québec solidaire | Adam Veilleux | 701 | 2.35 | +0.01 |
| Parti indépendantiste | Sébastien Hotte | 102 | 0.34 | – |
| Total valid votes | | 29,843 | 98.41 | – |
| Total rejected ballots | | 481 | 1.59 | – |
| Turnout | | 30,324 | 61.33 | -14.02 |
| Electors on the lists | | 49,441 | – | – |

2007 Quebec general election: Groulx
| Party | Candidate | Votes | % | ±% |
|---|---|---|---|---|
| Action démocratique | Linda Lapointe | 13,630 | 37.45 | +18.07 |
| Parti Québécois | Rachel Gagnon | 10,513 | 28.89 | -9.78 |
| Liberal | Pierre Descoteaux | 9,898 | 27.20 | -12.34 |
| Green | Robert Harenclak | 1,503 | 4.13 | – |
| Québec solidaire | Adam Veilleux | 850 | 2.34 | +1.09* |
| Total valid votes | | 36,394 | 99.15 | – |
| Total rejected ballots | | 311 | 0.85 | – |
| Turnout | | 36,705 | 75.35 | +1.83 |
| Electors on the lists | | 48,715 | – | – |
