= Gilles Perron =

Canadian politician (1940–2024)

Gilles A. Perron

Member of Parliament for Rivière-des-Mille-Îles
- In office 1997–2008
- Succeeded by: Luc Desnoyers

Personal details
- Born: December 10, 1940 Évain, Quebec, Canada
- Died: June 11, 2024 (aged 83)
- Party: Bloc Québécois
- Profession: Political advisor

Gilles A. Perron (December 10, 1940 – June 11, 2024) was a Canadian politician.

Perron was a Bloc Québécois Member of the House of Commons of Canada first elected to the House in the Canadian federal election of 1997 from the riding of Saint-Eustache—Sainte-Thérèse. He was re-elected in the Canadian federal elections of 2000 and 2004 from the riding of Rivière-des-Mille-Îles. Perron acted, at various times, as the Bloc's critic of Veterans Affairs, Public Service Renewal and National Revenue. He was also a political advisor and technician. Perron died on June 11, 2024, at the age of 83.
