= Louis-Onésime Loranger =

Canadian politician

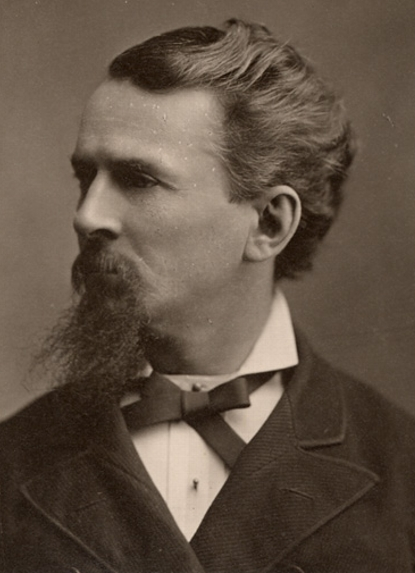
- Louis-Onésime Loranger, c.1870

MLA for Laval
- In office 1875–1882
- Preceded by: Joseph-Hyacinthe Bellerose
- Succeeded by: Pierre-Évariste Leblanc

Personal details
- Born: April 7, 1837 Yamachiche, Lower Canada
- Died: August 18, 1917 (aged 80) Saint-Hilaire (Mont-Saint-Hilaire), Quebec
- Resting place: Notre Dame des Neiges Cemetery
- Party: Conservative
- Relations: Thomas-Jean-Jacques Loranger, brother

Louis-Onésime Loranger (April 7, 1837 – August 18, 1917) was a Canadian lawyer, politician, and judge.

Born in Yamachiche, Lower Canada, the son of Joseph Loranger and Marie-Louise Dugal, Loranger was educated in Montreal at the Petit Séminaire de Montréal and studied law at the Collège Sainte-Marie. He was called to the Bar of the Province of Canada in 1858 and practiced law with his brothers, Thomas-Jean-Jacques and Jean-Marie. He was made a Queen's Counsel in 1881.

He was first elected to the Legislative Assembly of Quebec for the electoral district of Laval in the 1875 election. A Conservative, he was re-elected in 1881. From 1879 to 1882, he was the attorney general in the cabinet of Premier Joseph-Adolphe Chapleau. He was also a member of the Montreal City Council for the ward of Saint-Louis from 1871 to 1877. He was president of the Saint-Jean-Baptiste Society of Montreal from 1895 to 1899.

In 1882, he was appointed a judge in the Superior Court of Quebec for the district of Montreal. He retired in 1909.
