= Hector Champagne =

Canadian lawyer and politician

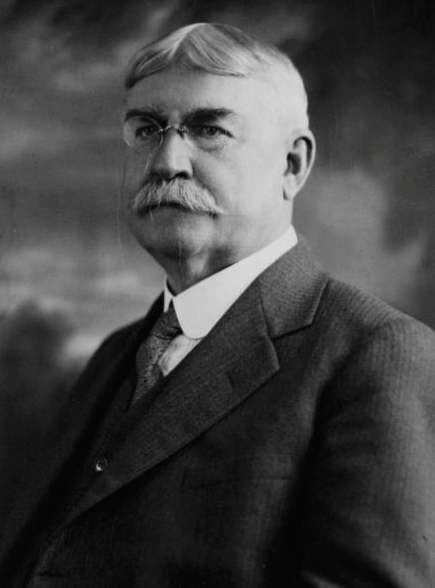

Member of the Legislative Assembly of Quebec for Deux-Montagnes
- In office 1897–1908
- Preceded by: Benjamin Beauchamp
- Succeeded by: Arthur Sauvé

Member of the Legislative Council of Quebec for Mille-Isles
- In office 1908–1941
- Preceded by: François-Xavier Mathieu
- Succeeded by: Francis Lawrence Connors

Personal details
- Born: February 18, 1862 Saint-Eustache, Canada East
- Died: June 29, 1941 (aged 79) Saint-Laurent, Quebec
- Party: Liberal

Hector Champagne (February 18, 1862 – June 29, 1941) was a Canadian lawyer and politician. He became Queen's Counsel and was educated at the University of Paris.

Born in Saint-Eustache, Canada East, Champagne was educated at the Académie commerciale de Saint-Eustache, the Séminaire de Sainte-Thérèse-de-Blainville, the Collège Bourget, the Université Laval à Montréal, and the University of Paris. He was called to the Bar of Quebec in 1886 and created a Queen's Counsel in 1899.

A lawyer, he was elected to the Legislative Assembly of Quebec in Deux-Montagnes in 1897. A Liberal, he was re-elected in 1900 and acclaimed in 1904. He was defeated in 1908. He was appointed to the Legislative Council of Quebec for Mille-Isles in 1908. He died in office in Saint-Laurent, Quebec in 1941.
