= 1908 Quebec general election =

Canadian provincial election

- June 8, 1908

74 seats in the 12th Legislative Assembly of Quebec 38 seats were needed for a majority
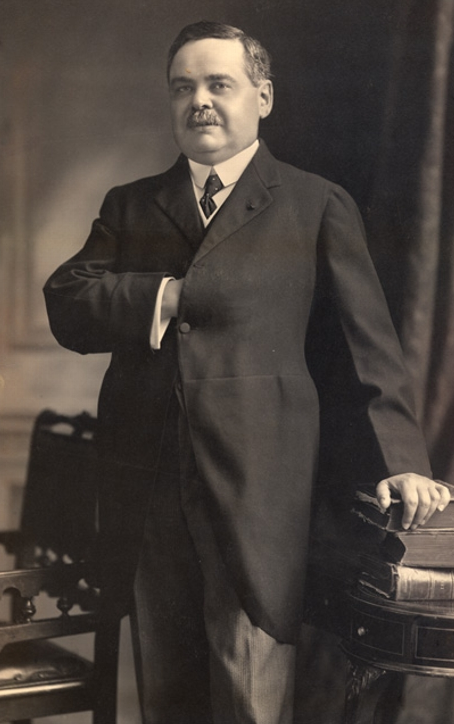

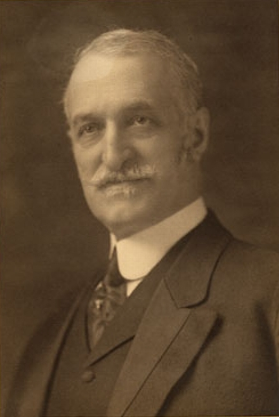
	First party	Second party
Leader	Lomer Gouin	Pierre-Évariste Leblanc
Party	Liberal	Conservative
Leader since	1905	1905
Leader's seat	Portneuf (Note: Gouin also ran in Montréal division no. 2 where he was defeated.)	Laval (lost re-election)
Last election	67 seats, 55.43%	7 seats, 26.73%
Seats won	57	14
Seat change	▼10	▲7
Popular vote	131,068	97,738
Percentage	53.53%	39.92%
Swing	▼1.9pp	▲13.19pp
Premier before election
Lomer Gouin
Liberal
Premier after election
Lomer Gouin
Liberal

The 1908 Quebec general election was held on June 8, 1908, to elect members of the 12th Legislative Assembly of the province of Quebec, Canada. The incumbent Quebec Liberal Party, led by Lomer Gouin, was re-elected, defeating the Quebec Conservative Party, led by Pierre-Évariste Leblanc.

== Results ==
Party	Party leader	# of candidates	Seats			Popular Vote		
Party	Party leader	# of candidates	1904	Elected	% Change	#	%	% Change
Liberal	Lomer Gouin	76	67	57	-14.9%	131,068	53.53%	-1.9%
Conservative	Pierre-Évariste Leblanc	62	7	14	+100%	97,738	39.92%	+13.19%
Ligue nationaliste	Henri Bourassa	3	*	3	*	6,298	2.57%	*
Other		10	-	-	-	9,728	3.97%	*
Total		151	74	74	-%	244,832	100%	

Popular vote
PLQ	53.53%
PCQ	39.92%
LN	2.57%
Others	3.97%

Seats summary
PLQ	77.03%
PCQ	18.92%
LN	4.05%

== See also ==
- List of Quebec premiers
- Politics of Quebec
- Timeline of Quebec history
- List of Quebec political parties
- 12th Legislative Assembly of Quebec
