= Tancrède-Charles Gaboury =

Canadian politician

Member of the Legislative Assembly of Quebec for Pontiac
- In office 1908–1912
- Preceded by: David Gillies
- Succeeded by: George Benjamin Campbell

Personal details
- Born: March 13, 1851 Saint-Jean-Baptiste, Canada East
- Died: December 28, 1937 (aged 86) Montreal, Quebec
- Party: Liberal

Tancrède-Charles Gaboury (French pronunciation: [tɑ̃kʁɛd ʃaʁl ɡabuʁi]; March 13, 1851 – December 28, 1937) was a physician and political figure in Quebec. He represented Pontiac in the Legislative Assembly of Quebec from 1908 to 1912 as a Liberal.

He was born in Saint-Jean-Baptiste, Canada East, the son of Jean-Baptiste Gaboury and Rosalie Ayet dit Malo, and was educated there, at the Collège de Saint-Hyacinthe, at Saint Joseph's University in Ottawa and at Victoria College in Montreal. He qualified to practise as a doctor in 1873 and settled at Sainte-Rose, later moving to the Outaouais region, where he practised at Bryson and Campbell's Bay. He was also president of the Hôpital Gaboury. In 1877, he married Mary Jane Fletcher. Gaboury was mayor of Bryson in 1889, 1890 and 1897. He ran unsuccessfully for a seat in the House of Commons in 1896. He was defeated when he ran for reelection to the Quebec assembly in 1912. Gaboury was a provincial tax collector for Montreal district from 1913 until his death in Montreal at the age of 86. He was buried in Rigaud.

His brother Amédée also served in the Quebec assembly.
