= Pierre-Évariste Leblanc =

Sir Pierre-Évariste Leblanc KCMG KC
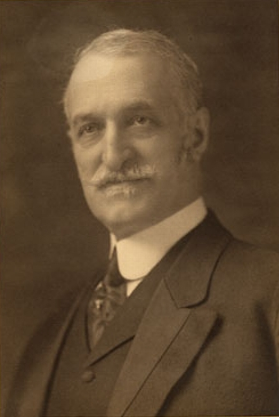

11th Lieutenant Governor of Quebec
- In office February 8, 1915 – October 18, 1918
- Monarch: George V
- Governors General: the Duke of Connaught and Strathearn; The Duke of Devonshire
- Premier: Lomer Gouin
- Preceded by: François Langelier
- Succeeded by: Charles Fitzpatrick

Member of the Legislative Assembly of Quebec for Laval
- In office October 30, 1882 – June 13, 1883
- Preceded by: Louis-Onésime Loranger
- Succeeded by: Amédée Gaboury
- In office July 14, 1884 – June 8, 1908
- Preceded by: Amédée Gaboury
- Succeeded by: Joseph Wenceslas Levesque

Leader of the Official Opposition of Quebec
- In office 1905 – June 8, 1908
- Preceded by: Edmund James Flynn
- Succeeded by: Joseph-Mathias Tellier

Speaker of the Legislative Assembly of Quebec
- In office April 26, 1892 – November 23, 1897
- Preceded by: Félix-Gabriel Marchand
- Succeeded by: Jules Tessier

Personal details
- Born: August 10, 1853 Saint-Martin (Laval), Canada East
- Died: October 18, 1918 (aged 65) Sillery, Quebec
- Party: Conservative
- Spouse: Josephine-Hermine Beaudry (m. 1886)
- Children: 3
- Occupation: teacher, lawyer
- Profession: politician

Sir Pierre-Évariste Leblanc, KCMG KC (French pronunciation: [pjɛʁ evaʁist ləblɑ̃]; August 10, 1853 – October 18, 1918) was born in Saint-Martin (today part of Laval, Quebec).

He was a Quebec Conservative Party leader but never premier. First elected to the Legislative Assembly in a by-election in 1882 in the riding of Laval, he served as leader of the Opposition from 1905 to 1908, when he lost the 1908 election and his own seat. Served as the 11th Lieutenant Governor of Quebec from February 12, 1915, until his death in Spencer Wood, Sillery, in 1918. Leblanc was buried at cimetière Notre-Dame-des-Neiges in Montreal.

Prior to his political career, Leblanc was a teacher and a lawyer.

== Elections as party leader ==
He lost the 1908 election.

== See also ==
- Politics of Quebec
- List of Quebec general elections
- List of Quebec leaders of the Opposition
- Timeline of Quebec history
