= Daniel Goyer =

Canadian politician

MNA for Deux-Montagnes
- In office 2012–2014
- Preceded by: Benoit Charette
- Succeeded by: Benoit Charette

Personal details
- Party: Parti Québécois

Daniel Goyer is a Canadian politician. He was a member of the National Assembly of Quebec for the riding of Deux-Montagnes, first elected in the 2012 election. He was defeated in the 2014 election.
