= 1881 Quebec general election =

Canadian provincial election

- December 2, 1881

65 seats in the 5th Legislative Assembly of Quebec 33 seats needed for a majority
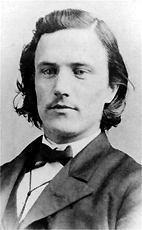

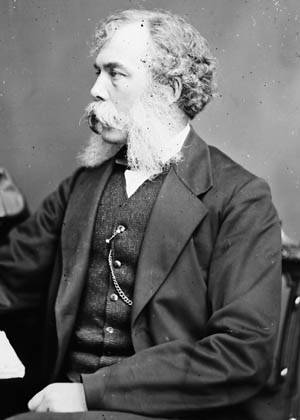
	First party	Second party
Leader	Joseph-Adolphe Chapleau	Henri-Gustave Joly de Lotbinière
Party	Conservative	Liberal
Leader since	1878	1869
Leader's seat	Terrebonne	Lotbinière
Last election	32 seats 49.5% popular vote	31 seats 47.5% popular vote
Seats won	49	15
Seat change	▲17	▼16
Popular vote	49,152	38,020
Percentage	50.4%	39.0%
Swing	▲0.9%	▼8.5%
Premier before election
Joseph-Adolphe Chapleau
Conservative
Premier after election
Joseph-Adolphe Chapleau
Conservative

The 1881 Quebec general election was held on December 2, 1881, to elect members of the 5th Legislative Assembly for the province of Quebec, Canada. The Quebec Conservative Party, led by Premier Joseph-Adolphe Chapleau, defeated the Quebec Liberal Party, led by Henri-Gustave Joly de Lotbinière.

The turnout was 44.53%.

== Results ==
Party	Party Leader	# of candidates	Seats			Popular Vote		
Party	Party Leader	# of candidates	1878	Elected	% Change	#	%	% Change
Conservative	Joseph-Adolphe Chapleau		32	49	+53.1%	49,152	50.38%	+0.9%
Liberal	Henri-Gustave Joly de Lotbinière		31	15	-51.6%	38 020	38.97%	-8.5%
Independent Conservative			2	1	-50.0%	10 387	10.65%	+7.6%
Other			-	-	-	10 387	10.65%	+7.6%
Total			65	65	-		100%	

Popular vote
PCQ	50.38%
PLQ	38.97%
Others	10.65%

Seats summary
PCQ	75.38%
PLQ	23.08%
Others	1.54%

== See also ==
- List of Quebec premiers
- Politics of Quebec
- Timeline of Quebec history
- List of Quebec political parties
- 5th Legislative Assembly of Quebec
