= Luc Desilets =

Canadian politician

Member of Parliament for Rivière-des-Mille-Îles
- In office October 21, 2019 – March 23, 2025
- Preceded by: Linda Lapointe
- Succeeded by: Linda Lapointe

Personal details
- Party: Bloc Québécois
- Parent: Antoine Desilets

Luc Desilets is a Canadian politician. He was elected to the House of Commons of Canada in the 2019 election from Rivière-des-Mille-Îles as a member of the Bloc Québécois. He is the son of Antoine Desilets.

== Political career ==
From 2021 to 2025 he had served as the veterans critic in the Bloc Québécois Shadow Cabinet.

== Electoral record ==
2025 Canadian federal election: Rivière-des-Mille-Îles
Party	Candidate	Votes	%	±%
Liberal	Linda Lapointe	27,218	45.63	+10.27
Bloc Québécois	Luc Desilets	19,669	32.84	–7.70
Conservative	Elia Lopez	10,398	17.36	+7.11
New Democratic	Joseph Hakizimana	1,270	2.12	–5.08
Green	Alec Ware	734	1.23	–0.51
People's	David Santamaria Quiceno	306	0.51	–2.24
Independent	Michel Genois	184	0.31	N/A
Total valid votes		59,887	98.58	
Total rejected ballots		862	1.42	-0.54
Turnout		60,749	71.80	+6.34
Eligible voters		84,606		
Liberal notional gain from Bloc Québécois		Swing		+8.98
Source: Elections Canada

2021 Canadian federal election: Rivière-des-Mille-Îles
Party	Candidate	Votes	%	±%	Expenditures
Bloc Québécois	Luc Desilets	21,645	40.6	±0.0	$17,235.31
Liberal	Linda Lapointe	18,835	35.3	-0.8	$63,876.62
Conservative	Marc Duffy-Vincelette	5,479	10.3	+2.2	$9,189.50
New Democratic	Joseph Hakizimana	3,852	7.2	-1.4	$24.86
People's	Hans Roker Jr.	1,468	2.8	+1.3	$0.00
Green	Alex Ware	972	1.8	-3.4	$0.00
Free	Valérie Beauséjour	847	1.6	N/A	$0.00
Patriote	Michael Dionne	149	0.3	N/A	$0.00
Indépendance du Québec	Julius Bute	119	0.2	N/A	$0.00
Total valid votes/expense limit		53,366	98.1	–	$113,035.56
Total rejected ballots		1,061	1.9		
Turnout		54,427	65.4		
Eligible voters		83,171			
Bloc Québécois hold		Swing		+0.4	
Source: Elections Canada

2019 Canadian federal election: Rivière-des-Mille-Îles
Party	Candidate	Votes	%	±%	Expenditures
Bloc Québécois	Luc Desilets	23,629	40.61	+15.19	$9,764.52
Liberal	Linda Lapointe	21,009	36.11	+3.74	none listed
New Democratic	Joseph Hakizimana	5,002	8.60	-20.88	$19,322.13
Conservative	Maikel Mikhael	4,684	8.05	-2.46	$20,256.23
Green	Ceylan Borgers	3,015	5.18	+3.22	none listed
People's	Hans Roker Jr.	845	1.45	–	$1,000.00
Total valid votes/expense limit		58,184	98.16		
Total rejected ballots		1,090	1.84	+0.27	
Turnout		59,274	71.96	-0.38	
Eligible voters		82,372			
Bloc Québécois gain from Liberal		Swing		+5.72	
Source: Elections Canada
