= John Whyte (politician) =

Canadian politician

John Whyte (January 4, 1838 – September 16, 1924) was a Scottish-born merchant and political figure in Quebec. He represented Mégantic in the Legislative Assembly of Quebec from 1884 to 1886 as a Liberal.

He was born in Dunfermline, the son of John Whyte and Elspeth Simpson. Whyte was educated in Fife and came to Canada East in 1858. In 1859, he married Harriet Donaldson Johnson. He worked at the Harvey Hill mine until 1862 and then was foreman at the mine in Sutton. He became a merchant at Leeds (later Saint-Pierre-de-Broughton) in 1865. He was elected to the Quebec assembly in an 1884 by-election held after George Irvine was named a judge. Whyte was defeated when he ran for reelection in 1886 and 1892. He died in Leeds at the age of 88.
