= Antoine Desilets =

Québécois photographer (1927–2019)

Antoine Desilets CQ
- Born: Jean Marcel Antoine Desilets; September 15, 1927; Montreal, Quebec, Canada
- Died: December 19, 2019 (aged 92)
- Occupation: Photographer
- Children: 6, including Luc Desilets
- Relatives: Georges Desilets (great-uncle)

Antoine Desilets (15 September 1927 – 19 December 2019) was a Québécois photographer. He is known as the father of photojournalism in Quebec.

== Biography ==
=== Early life ===
Jean Marcel Antoine Desilets was born on 15 September 1927 in Montreal, Quebec, Canada to Jean Sévère Desilets, a carpenter, and Cécile Dalpé. He was baptized on 18 September, and had his confirmation on 24 April by Monseigneur J.A Langlois.

His mother died in 1935, and his father grew unable to support the family financially. At age 9, Antoine was sent to the orphanage Christ-Roi in Nicolet with his five youngest siblings. Desilets's passion for photography was sparked by a visit to his great-uncle's photo lab at the archbishopric. He obtained his secondary education in an English school of the Greater Montreal area.

Desilets left the orphanage and worked under Hans Selye at McGill University. Uninterested with Selye's laboratory work, he instead enrolled in correspondence photography courses. By 18 years old, he had enlisted in the Royal Canadian Air Force. He was trained as an aerial photographer, and then voluntarily got himself fired by refusing to follow orders.

=== Career ===
Desilets's career began with freelance work and selling cameras. Starting in 1955, Desilets worked for Canadair while doing freelance contracts. He was fired after borrowing the company's Leica camera for outside work against company regulations.

From 1957 to 1961, Desilets then worked in Studio David Bier's darkroom. He had sent job applications to multiple newspapers, but none answered. Studio David Bier had contracts with Montreal Star and Montréal Matin for sports coverage.

Through his father's contacts, Desilets obtained a job at La Presse in 1961. During the summer break, he filled in for photographers of the coloured supplement for an important report. The supplement's director, Serge Larochelle, was impressed with the quality of Desilets's photographs and hired him. In 1969, Desilets was assigned to the newspaper's daily coverage, much to his dissatisfaction.

Desilets resigned from La Presse in 1974 to join Le Jour. The newspaper's pro-independence position aligned with Desilets's politics. It ceased operations in 1976.

Between 1976 and 1979, Desilets taught photography at CESTI's school of Dakar University, Senegal for the federal government. In 1981 he worked for the magazine Photo Sélection. He then went into semi-retirement as a freelancer.

=== Later life ===
Desilets died on 19 December 2019. By then, he was known as the father of photojournalism in Québec. He had six children, including Luc Desilets.

== Awards ==
- 1963, 1965 : Association des photographes de presse de Montréal, Best Photographer of the Year
- 1966, 1967, 1968, 1969 : National Press Photographers Association of North America, Best Photographer of the Year (Canada and New York section)
- 1970: First Prize for architectural photography for the Association des photographes professionnels du Canada
- 1982: First Prize of the Photography Museum of Paris
- 1990: Knight of the Order of Quebec

== Bibliography ==
Antoine Desilets wrote a large corpus of books to vulgarize photography. By 2019, he had sold over 700 000 books worldwide. They have been translated into English, Spanish and Portuguese.

Année	Titre
1966	Apprenez la photographie
1971	La technique de la photo
1972	Je prends des photos
1972	Les insolences d'Antoine
1973	Je développe mes photos : tous les secrets de la chambre noire
1973	Techniques in Photography
1974	Taking Photography
1974	Developing Your Photographs
1975	Photo-Guide
1978	Learning Photography
1978	La photo de A à Z
1979	La photo à la portée de tous
1980	Découvrez le monde merveilleux de la photographie
1981	Le guide des accessoires et appareils photos
1984	Aprende Fotografia
1985	Le guide-photo
1986	Astucia Fotografica
2011	Antoine Desilets: trente ans d’images
2017	Expo 67: 50 ans, 50 souvenirs marquants et autres secrets bien gardés
