= Henri-Josué Martin =

Canadian politician

Henri-Josué Martin (March 12, 1843 – August 14, 1926) was a physician and political figure in Quebec. He represented Bonaventure in the Legislative Assembly of Quebec from 1882 to 1890 as a Conservative.

He was born in Rimouski, Canada East, the son of Édouard Martin and Catherine Lepage, and was educated in Rimouski, at the Séminaire de Québec and the Université Laval. Martin qualified as a doctor in 1877 and set up practice in Carleton. He was married twice: to Émilia Jane Verge in 1869 and to Louise Poirier in 1895. He served as mayor of Carleton and was also president of the school board. Martin was first elected to the Quebec assembly in an 1882 by-election held after Louis-Joseph Riopel was elected to the House of Commons. He died in Carleton at the age of 83.
