= Luc Desnoyers =

Canadian trade unionist and politician

Luc Desnoyers MP

Member of Parliament for Rivière-des-Mille-Îles
- In office 2008–2011
- Preceded by: Gilles Perron
- Succeeded by: Laurin Liu

Personal details
- Born: October 2, 1950 (age 76) Saint-Jérôme, Quebec
- Party: Bloc Québécois

Luc Desnoyers (born October 2, 1950) is a Canadian trade unionist and politician, who was elected to represent the electoral district of Rivière-des-Mille-Îles in the 2008 Canadian federal election. He is a member of the Bloc Québécois.

After one term in office, he was defeated in the 2011 election by Laurin Liu of the New Democratic Party.
