= Laval (provincial electoral district) =

Coordinates: 45.57°N 73.75°W

Quebec electoral district

Defunct provincial electoral district
- Legislature: National Assembly of Quebec
- District created: 1867
- District abolished: 1980
- First contested: 1867
- Last contested: 1976

Laval (French: [laval]) was a former provincial electoral district in the province of Quebec, Canada. It was located in the Laval region north of Montreal, but for some of its history it also included parts of Montreal itself.

It was created for the 1867 election (and an electoral district of that name existed earlier in the Legislative Assembly of the Province of Canada). The final election where Laval was a riding was in 1976. Electoral district boundaries were changed for the 1981 election and its successor electoral districts were Fabre and Chomedey.

== Members of the Legislative Assembly / National Assembly ==
- Joseph-Hyacinthe Bellerose, Conservative Party (1867–1875)
- Louis-Onésime Loranger, Conservative Party (1875–1882)
- Pierre-Évariste Leblanc, Conservative Party (1882–1883)
- Amédée Gaboury, Liberal (1883–1884)
- Pierre-Évariste Leblanc, Conservative Party (1884–1908)
- Joseph Wenceslas Levesque, Liberal (1908–1919)
- Joseph-Olivier Renaud, Conservative Party (1919–1931)
- Joseph Filion, Liberal (1931–1935)
- François-Joseph Leduc, Conservative Party – Union Nationale – Liberal (1935–1948)
- Omer Barrière, Union Nationale (1948–1956)
- Léopold Pouliot, Union Nationale (1956–1960)
- Jean-Noël Lavoie, Liberal (1960–1981)
