= Amédée Gaboury =

Canadian politician

Member of the Legislative Assembly of Quebec for Laval
- In office 1883–1884
- Preceded by: Pierre-Évariste Leblanc
- Succeeded by: Pierre-Évariste Leblanc

Personal details
- Born: March 26, 1838 Saint-Jean-Baptiste, Lower Canada
- Died: June 11, 1912 (aged 74) Saint-Martin (Laval), Quebec
- Party: Liberal
- Relations: Tancrède-Charles Gaboury, brother

Amédée Gaboury (French pronunciation: [amede ɡabuʁi]; March 26, 1838 – June 11, 1912) was a physician and political figure in Quebec. He represented Laval in the Legislative Assembly of Quebec from 1883 to 1884 as a Liberal.

He was born in Saint-Jean-Baptiste, Lower Canada, the son of Jean-Baptiste Gaboury and Rosalie Ayet dit Malo. He was educated at the Collège de Saint-Hyacinthe and the Victoria School of Medicine at Montreal. He qualified as a doctor in 1862 and set up practice at Saint-Martin. Martin was married twice: to Virginie Lavoie in 1873 and later to Rosalie Picard. He was elected in an 1883 by-election held after the election of Pierre-Évariste Leblanc was declared invalid. His election was overturned by the Quebec Superior Court in 1884 and he lost the subsequent by-election to Leblanc. He died in Saint-Martin at the age of 73.

His brother Tancrède-Charles also served in the Quebec assembly.
