= Émery Lalonde Sr. =

Canadian politician

Émery Lalonde (April 29, 1821 – April 25, 1888) was a merchant and political figure in Quebec. He represented Vaudreuil in the Legislative Assembly of Quebec as a Conservative member from 1871 to 1882.

He was born in Rigaud, Lower Canada, the son of Antoine Lalonde and Véronique Gemus. Lalonde was a partner in the firm Prévost, Hébert et Cie. In 1849, he married Marie-Claire-Louise Prévost. He was mayor of Sainte-Marthe from 1866 to 1868. He resigned his seat in the assembly in 1882 after being named an official in the courthouse at Montreal. Lalonde died in Montreal at the age of 66 and was buried in the Notre Dame des Neiges Cemetery.

His son Émery also represented Vaudreuil in the Quebec assembly.
