= Alfred Lapointe =

Canadian politician

Alfred Lapointe (9 April 1835 – 30 October 1915) was a farmer, miller and political figure in Quebec. He represented Vaudreuil in the Legislative Assembly of Quebec from 1884 to 1890 as a Conservative.

He was born Alfred Godard in Sainte-Thérèse, Lower Canada, the son of Jean-Marie Godard and Émilie Tremblay, and educated at the Collège de Sainte-Thérèse. Lapointe owned flour and sawmills. He was a justice of the peace and a commissioner for the trial of small causes. Lapointe was mayor of Sainte-Justine-de-Newton in 1876, from 1881 to 1885 and from 1903 to 1906. He was married twice: to Marie Antoinette Léontine Tessier in 1868 and to Susanna Towner in 1878. He ran unsuccessfully for a seat in the House of Commons in 1872, 1882 and again in 1900. He was first elected to the Quebec assembly in an 1884 by-election held after the election of François-Xavier Archambault was overturned. He was reelected in 1886 but defeated when he ran again in 1890.
