= Tom Mulcair =

Canadian politician and former leader of the Opposition (born 1954)

The Honourable Tom Mulcair PC
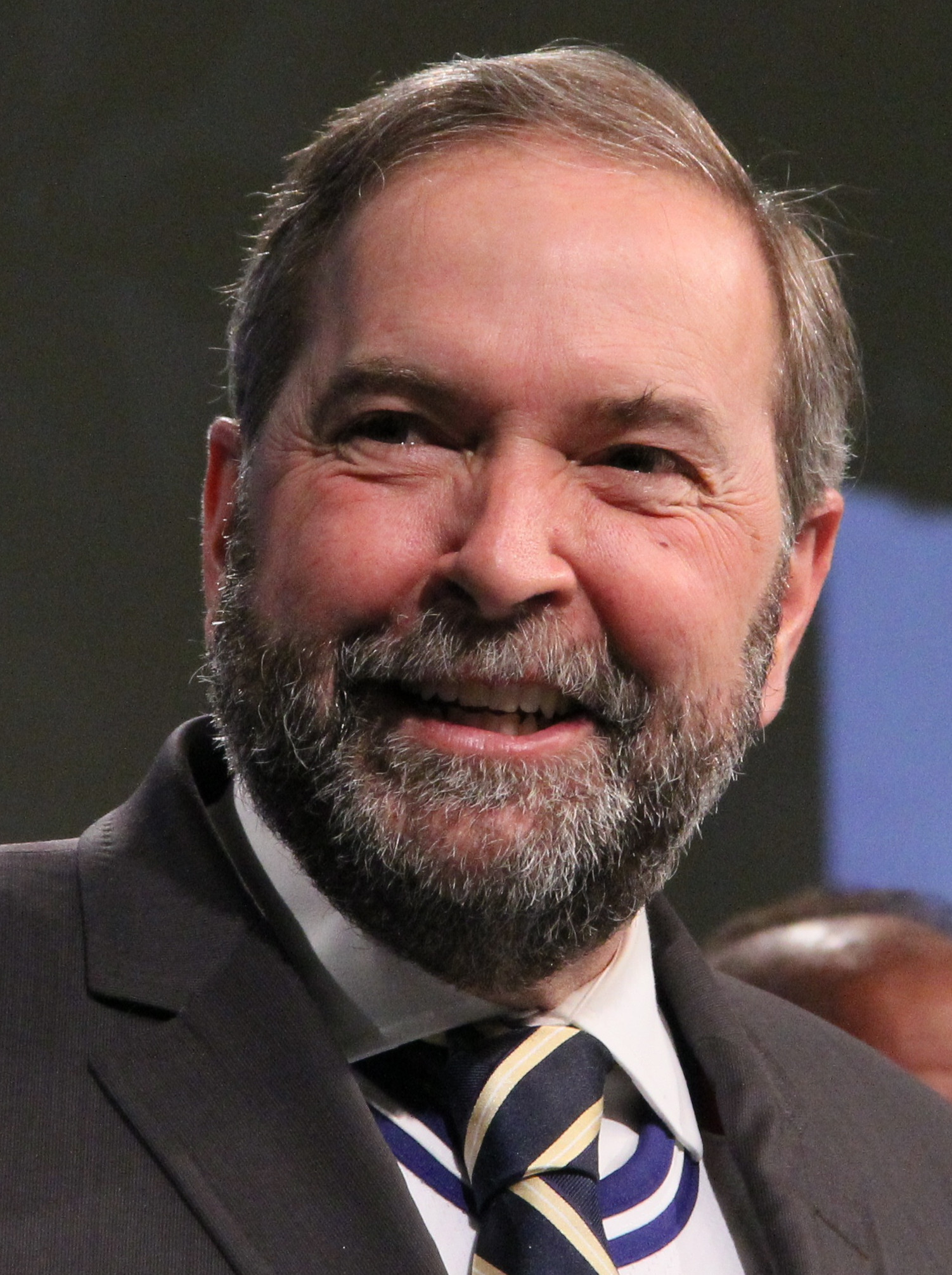
- Mulcair in 2014

Leader of the Opposition
- In office March 24, 2012 – November 4, 2015
- Preceded by: Nycole Turmel
- Succeeded by: Rona Ambrose

Leader of the New Democratic Party
- In office March 24, 2012 – October 1, 2017
- Deputy: Libby Davies; Megan Leslie; David Christopherson
- Preceded by: Nycole Turmel (interim)
- Succeeded by: Jagmeet Singh

Opposition House Leader
- In office May 26, 2011 – October 12, 2011
- Leader: Nycole Turmel (acting)
- Preceded by: David McGuinty
- Succeeded by: Joe Comartin

Member of Parliament for Outremont
- In office September 17, 2007 – August 3, 2018
- Preceded by: Jean Lapierre
- Succeeded by: Rachel Bendayan (2019)

Quebec Minister of Sustainable Development, Environment and Parks
- In office April 29, 2003 – February 27, 2006
- Premier: Jean Charest
- Preceded by: André Boisclair
- Succeeded by: Claude Béchard

Member of the National Assembly of Quebec for Chomedey
- In office September 12, 1994 – March 26, 2007
- Preceded by: Lise Bacon
- Succeeded by: Guy Ouellette

Personal details
- Born: Thomas Joseph Mulcair; October 24, 1954 (age 72) Ottawa, Ontario, Canada
- Citizenship: Canada; France
- Party: New Democratic (since 1974)
- Other political affiliations: Quebec Liberal (1994–2007)
- Spouse: Catherine Pinhas (m. 1976)
- Children: 2
- Education: McGill University
- Website: thomasmulcair.ca

Thomas Joseph Mulcair (born October 24, 1954) is a Canadian lawyer and retired politician who served as the leader of the New Democratic Party (NDP) from 2012 to 2017 and leader of the Official Opposition from 2012 to 2015. He was elected to the House of Commons in 2007 and sat as the member of Parliament (MP) for Outremont until 2018. Before entering federal politics, Mulcair served as the member of the National Assembly of Quebec (MNA) for Chomedey from 1994 to 2007, sitting as a Quebec Liberal. He was the environment minister of Quebec from 2003 until 2006 in Premier Jean Charest's government.

Mulcair was a senior civil servant in the Quebec provincial government, ran a private law practice, and taught law at the university level. Mulcair joined the federal NDP in 1974 and was the MNA for Chomedey in Laval from 1994 to 2007, holding the seat for the Quebec Liberal Party. In 2003, he was selected by Premier Jean Charest to be the minister of sustainable development, environment and parks, where he passed a bill recognizing the right to live in a healthy environment and respect for biodiversity into the Quebec Charter of Human Rights and Freedoms in 2006. Mulcair later resigned from cabinet in 2006 after opposing a development proposal in Mont-Orford National Park.

After his departure from Quebec politics, Mulcair was courted by federal political parties. In April 2007, he announced that he would run as the NDP candidate in Outremont. Mulcair contested a by-election in September, winning and becoming the second NDP MP to be elected in Quebec, and the only member of the NDP caucus from Quebec at the time. NDP leader Jack Layton named Mulcair as the party's Quebec lieutenant and co-deputy leader, and he held the seat in the 2008 election. In the 2011 federal election, while the Conservatives were elected to a majority government, the NDP won 59 of Quebec's 75 ridings, a rise in popularity known as the Orange Wave, and formed the Official Opposition for the first time in the party's history.

Following the death of Jack Layton, Mulcair was elected as the leader of the NDP on the fourth ballot of the 2012 leadership election, making him Leader of the Official Opposition. As leader, Mulcair generally positioned the NDP to the right of the Liberal Party on fiscal policy, which included advocating for balanced budgets. Though polls early in the 2015 federal election campaign indicated the possibility of an NDP minority government, the party lost over half of its seats and resumed third party status. During a leadership review vote held at the 2016 federal NDP convention, 52 per cent of the delegates voted to hold a leadership election in October 2017. Mulcair stated he would remain leader until the party chose a replacement. He later announced in May 2016 that he would retire from politics and would not contest his riding in the next federal election.

Mulcair resigned his seat on August 3, 2018, in order to accept a position in the political science department of the University of Montreal. He has also been hired as an on-air political analyst for CJAD, CTV News Channel, and TVA. In 2026, he joined the Strategic Advisory Board of Wellington Advocacy.

== Early life and education ==
Thomas Joseph Mulcair was born in October 24, 1954, at the Ottawa Hospital in Ottawa, Ontario. His parents lived in the Wrightville district of Hull (now Gatineau) at the time.

His father, Harry Donnelly Mulcair, worked in insurance and was the descendant of Irish immigrants who arrived in the Quebec City area during the Great Irish Famine of the 1840s. His paternal grandfather moved to Montreal to become a tailor. His mother, Jeanne Hurtubise, a school teacher, was French Canadian and the great-granddaughter of Quebec premiers Pierre-Joseph-Olivier Chauveau and Honoré Mercier. Her father was a businessman and the founding mayor of Sainte-Anne-des-Lacs in the Laurentian Mountains north of Montreal, where she met her husband in 1948.

The Mulcairs soon moved to the middle-class district of Chomedey in Laval, a suburb of Montreal, where Thomas would grow up as the second-eldest in a close-knit family of ten children. It was a bilingual, Catholic household where children were educated in English and French Catholic schools, although the family stopped attending Mass over a disagreement with the parish priest about birth control. Both parents were supporters of the Quebec Liberal Party. Mulcair went to Laval Catholic High School, where he was influenced by Quebec's tradition of Catholic progressivism. He got interested in politics and activism after organizing a successful sit-in to protest the administration’s plan to abolish recess, and participated in weekend community work in Montreal organized by one of this teachers, Father Alan Cox.

After high school and graduating in social sciences from CEGEP Vanier College in 1973, Mulcair started law school at McGill University at age 18. That same year, his father lost his job. The parents, with eight children still at home, sold their home in Laval and moved to the family cottage in Saint-Anne-des-Lacs. Mulcair worked summers in construction, tarring roofs to pay for law school and housing, while borrowing money from his older sister to pay for books. A strong believer in social justice, he joined the NDP at age 19. During his penultimate year, he was elected president of the McGill Law Students Association, and sat on the council of the McGill Student Union. He obtained his degree in Civil Law in 1976, graduated in common law in 1977, and was admitted to the Bar in 1979.

== Early career ==
Mulcair moved to Quebec City to work in the Legislative Affairs branch in Quebec's Ministry of Justice from 1978 to 1980 and in the Legal Affairs Directorate of the Superior Council of the French Language from 1980 to 1982. He would also teach introductory law at Saint Lawrence College from 1979 to 1982.

In 1983, the Quebec government cut the salaries of civil servants by 20 per cent, so Mulcair and his young family moved to Montreal to became director of legal affairs at Alliance Quebec, a lobby group for the English-speaking community in Quebec. During that time, he played a role in amending the Charter of the French Language, in opposition to the goals of Quebec separatists. In 1985 he began a private law practice and was named the reviser of the statutes of Manitoba following the Supreme Court of Canada ruling in the Reference re Manitoba Language Rights case. Mulcair also taught law courses to non-law students at Concordia University in 1984 at the Saint Lawrence Campus of Champlain Regional College in Sainte-Foy,and at the Université du Québec à Trois-Rivières.

From 1986 to 1987, Mulcair was a commissioner on the Appeals Committee on the Language of Instruction, which dealt with English Catholic schools set up in defiance of Quebec's language laws. Appointed by Quebec Education Minister and former Quebec Liberal Party leader Claude Ryan. Mulcair credits Ryan with becoming his political mentor during this period.

Mulcair was president of the Office des professions du Québec from 1987 to 1993, where he introduced reforms to make disciplinary hearings more transparent and successfully led a major effort to have cases of alleged sexual abuse of patients decisively dealt with. Mulcair was also a board member of the group Conseil de la langue française, and at the time of his appointment to the Office des Professions he had been serving as president of the English speaking Catholic Council.

== Provincial politics (1994–2007) ==
Mulcair first entered the National Assembly in the 1994 election, winning the riding of Chomedey as a member of the Quebec Liberal Party. Mulcair claims he ran as a Liberal because at the time, it was the only credible federalist provincial party in Quebec. In that era, Quebec was the only province where the NDP was not fully organized; its Quebec wing had seceded in 1990 to preach sovereigntism. He was re-elected in 1998, and again in 2003 when the Liberals ousted the Parti Québécois (PQ) in the provincial election.

After the 1995 referendum, Mulcair was eminent in demanding an inquiry about the rejection of thousands of ballots for the 'No' side.

According to Le Devoir journalist Michel David, Mulcair is the person who coined the expression Pinocchio syndrome, which was the title of a book by André Pratte published in 1997 about lies in politics. In the book, Mulcair speaks about why he believes lying is common in politics, because, according to him, "people feel free to manipulate journalists and say just about anything."

Newly elected Premier Jean Charest named Mulcair as the minister of sustainable development, environment and parks. At the time of his appointment, he had been serving on several volunteer boards including The Montreal Oral School for the Deaf, Operation Enfant Soleil and the Saint-Patrick's Society. During his tenure he was a supporter of the Kyoto Protocol, and drafted a bill amending the Quebec Charter of Human Rights and Freedoms to include the right to live in a healthy environment. The bill passed in 2006.

Mulcair accused former PQ minister Yves Duhaime of influence peddling. Duhaime filed a defamation suit in 2005 and Mulcair was ordered to pay $95,000, plus legal costs. In 2010 the provincial police anti-corruption squad in Quebec investigated Laval mayor Gilles Vaillancourt for allegations of bribing several provincial politicians. The probe contacted Mulcair to discuss a suspected bribe offered to him in 1994. Mulcair claims he never looked in the envelope and handed it back to the mayor.

=== Sustainable development and infrastructure ===
On November 25, 2004, Mulcair launched Quebec's Sustainable Development Plan and tabled a draft bill on sustainable development. Also included was a proposed amendment to the Quebec Charter of Human Rights and Freedoms to create a new right, the right to live in a healthy environment that respects biodiversity, in accordance with the guidelines and standards set out in the act. Mulcair's Sustainable Development Plan was based on the successful European model and was described as one of the most avant-garde in North America. Mulcair followed the proposal by embarking on a 21-city public consultation tour, and the bill was unanimously adopted by the National Assembly of Quebec in April 2006.

Accomplishments related to infrastructure included the completion of Autoroute 30 between Vaudreuil and Brossard, Autoroute 50 between Gatineau and Lachute, the widening of Route 175 between Stoneham and Saguenay, the widening of Route 185 from Rivière-du-Loup to the New Brunswick border and the introduction of a toll bridge which would complete Autoroute 25 between Montreal and Laval.

=== Departure from cabinet ===
In 2006, Mulcair opposed a proposed condominium development in the mountain and ski resort of Mont Orford National Park. During a February 27, 2006 Cabinet shuffle, Charest removed Mulcair from the sustainable development, environment, and parks portfolio, and offered him the lesser government services portfolio. His opposition to the government's development plans fuelled speculation that this was a punishment, which led Mulcair to resign from cabinet rather than accept the apparent demotion. The testimony of Charest, incoming environment minister Claude Béchard, and the owner of the company pursuing the development plan, Andre L'Esperance, all contradicted Mulcair, saying that the Orford deal had been approved by Mulcair before he left.

On February 20, 2007, he announced that he would not be a Liberal candidate in the 2007 Quebec general election.

== Federal political beginnings (2007–2011) ==
With his exit from the provincial Liberals, Mulcair explored an entry into federal politics, having discussions with the federal Liberal Party, the New Democratic Party, and the Conservative Party. During this time he also considered a job with a prominent law firm's environment section. Talks with the Conservatives failed because of differing views on the Kyoto Protocol.

Although Mulcair has identified former Quebec Liberal Party leader Claude Ryan as his political mentor, his presence in the front row during a speech in Montreal by NDP leader Jack Layton in March 2007 led to speculation about his political future. Over the course of several months, Layton persuaded Mulcair to run for the NDP in Quebec, where the party had no seats. On April 20, 2007, Mulcair confirmed that he would run for the NDP in the 2008 federal election.

=== Member of Parliament ===
==== 2007 Outremont by-election ====
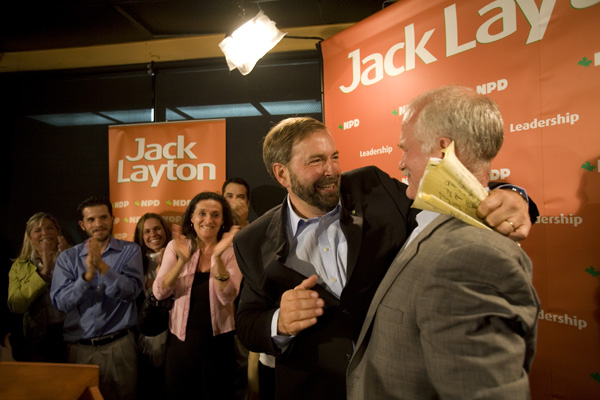
Tom Mulcair celebrates his by-election win with Jack Layton

Mulcair also became Layton's Quebec lieutenant. On June 21, 2007, in an uncontested nomination, Mulcair became the NDP's candidate in the riding of Outremont for a by-election on September 17. Mulcair won the by-election, defeating Liberal candidate Jocelyn Coulon 48 per cent to 29 per cent; the seat had been a Liberal stronghold since 1935 (except for the 1988 election). Jean Lapierre suggested that Mulcair was likely aided by defecting Bloc Québécois supporters (the Bloc candidate had finished second in the 2006 federal election). In addition, Coulon's writings had been condemned by B'nai Brith Canada; the local Jewish community in Outremont made up 10 per cent of the riding demographics.

Mulcair contradicted many federalists by defending the Quebec NDP’s Sherbrooke Declaration, which claimed that a 50 per cent plus one vote is sufficient for Quebec secession.

Mulcair was only the second NDP MP ever elected from Quebec, following Phil Edmonston in 1990 (one previous MP, Robert Toupin, had crossed the floor to the NDP in 1986). Mulcair is also only the second non-Liberal ever to win Outremont, following Progressive Conservative Jean-Pierre Hogue in 1988.

==== Activities ====
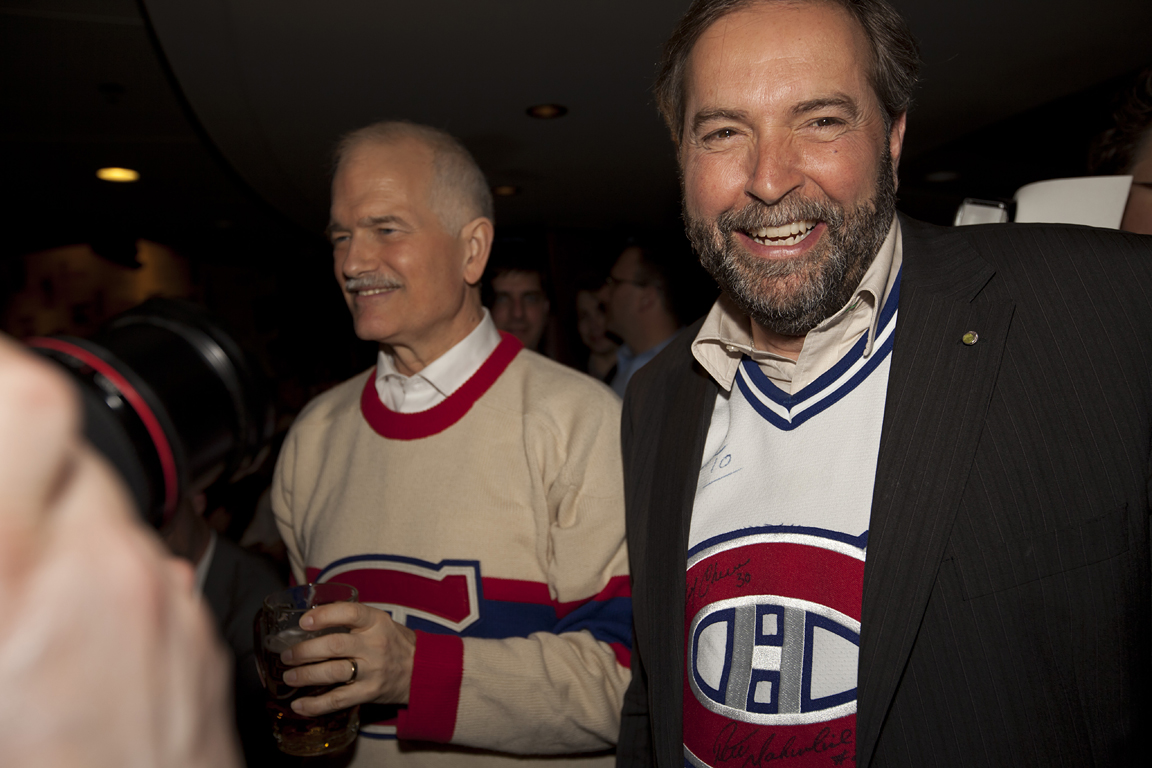
Jack Layton and Tom Mulcair in Montreal, 2011

Mulcair was sworn in on October 12, 2007. Earlier, he was named co-deputy leader of the NDP along with Libby Davies. As the party's Quebec lieutenant, he worked to improve the standard of translation for the campaign's francophone party materials, with Layton's support.

On October 14, 2008, Mulcair was re-elected as the MP for Outremont, making him the first New Democrat to win a riding in Quebec during a federal general election. He defeated the federal Liberal candidate, Sébastien Dhavernas, by 14,348 votes to 12,005 (a margin of 6.4 per cent).

In the 2011 federal election, despite facing a challenge from Liberal former federal justice minister Martin Cauchon, Mulcair was re-elected once more with 56.4 per cent of the popular vote, 21,916 to 9,204. The NDP became the Official Opposition for the first time ever, mainly on the strength of winning 59 of Quebec's 75 ridings, including Mulcair's. This was a notable political event, nicknamed the "orange wave".

== Leader of the New Democratic Party (2012–2017) ==
=== 2012 leadership campaign ===
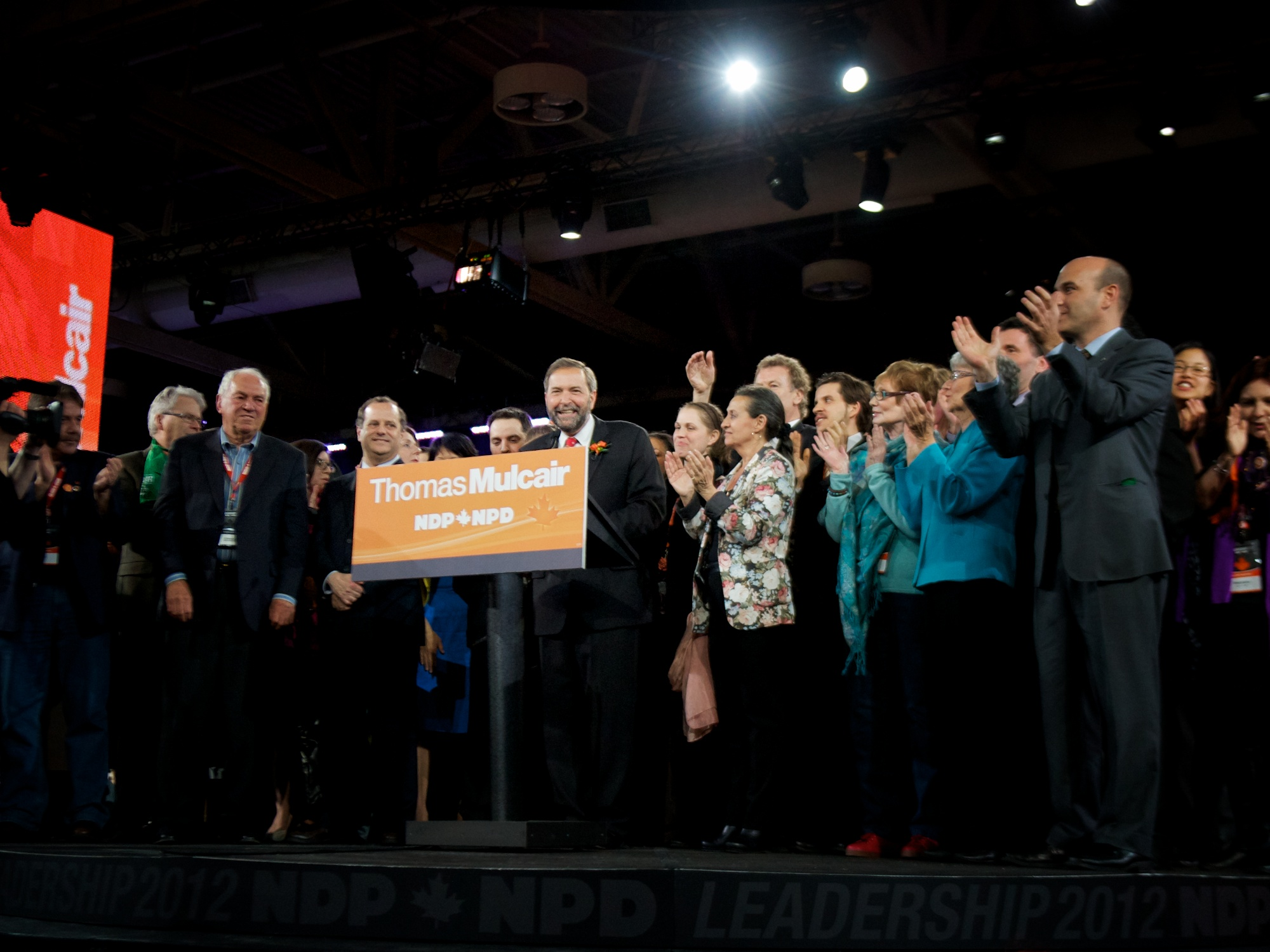
Thomas Mulcair gives his acceptance speech after being named NDP leader on March 24, 2012

Federal NDP leader Jack Layton died on August 22, 2011, following a battle with cancer, and was honoured with a state funeral. Mulcair stated that Layton's death had hit him exceptionally hard, and that while he was considering a federal NDP leadership bid, he would need several weeks to make up his mind on that decision. On October 13, 2011, at a press conference in suburban Montreal, Mulcair declared his candidacy for the federal NDP leadership, scheduled for March 23–24, 2012. He attracted the support of 60 of the 101 other federal NDP MPs, including Robert Chisholm and Romeo Saganash, the only two to have dropped out of the leadership race.

Mulcair campaigned on reinventing the party, to strengthen its presence in Quebec, and attract voters in other parts of the country. However, leadership rival Brian Topp and former NDP leader Ed Broadbent framed the race as staying true to the NDP cause under Topp, versus moving the party to the political centre and away from its principles under Mulcair.

At the leadership convention, Mulcair was elected NDP leader on the fourth ballot with 57.2 per cent of the vote, versus Topp's 42.8 per cent. Broadbent went on to praise Mulcair's work as a parliamentarian.

=== Leader of the Opposition ===
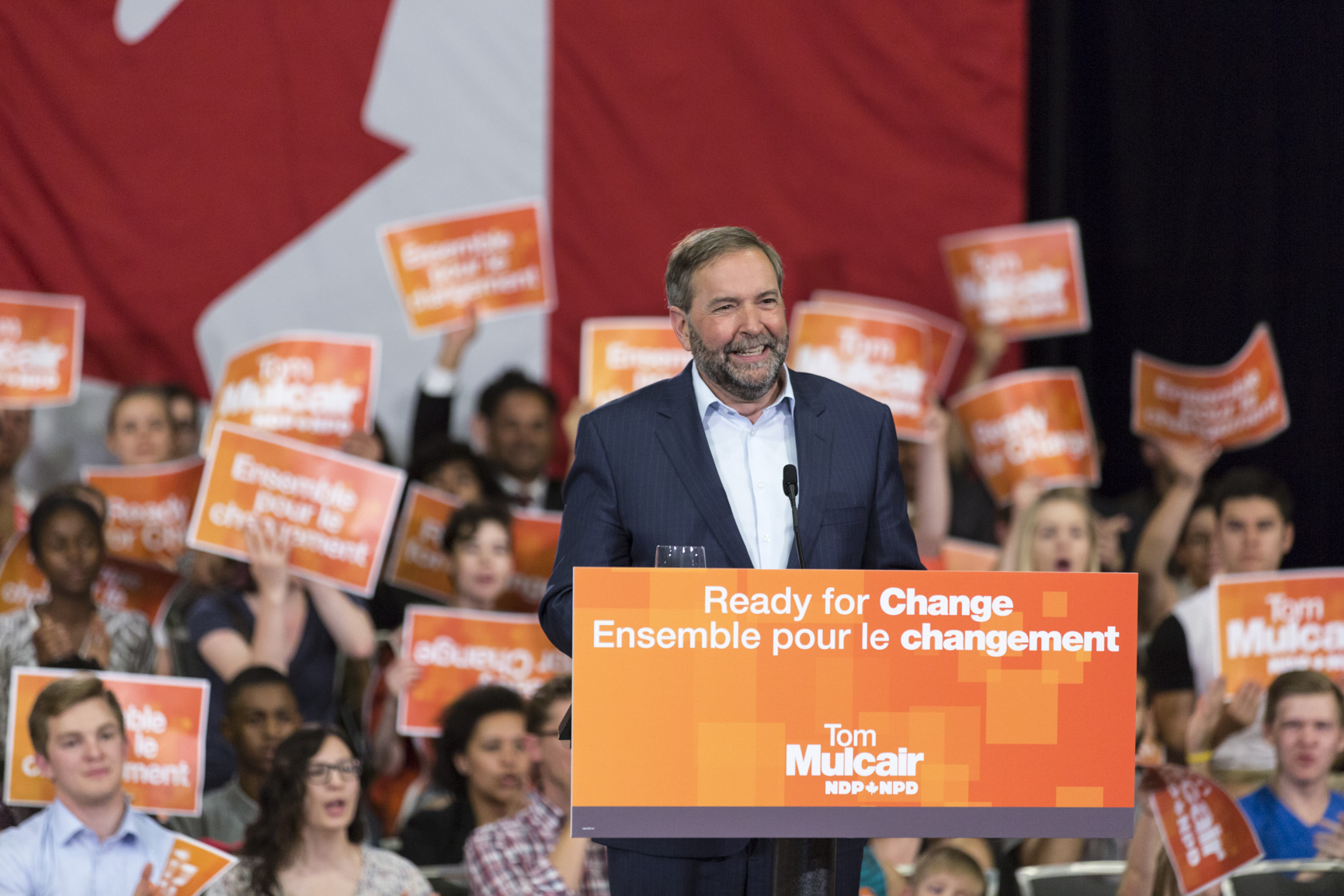
Tom Mulcair at the Rally for Change

On April 18, 2012, Mulcair and his wife moved into Stornoway. He was sworn into the Privy Council for Canada on September 14, 2012, entitling him to the style "The Honourable" for life.

His first year as leader of the NDP was plagued by several prominent defections. Thunder Bay—Superior North MP Bruce Hyer opted to sit as an independent after being disciplined for voting in favour of the dissolution of the Canadian Firearms Registry, a position counter to one strongly championed by Mulcair. Jonquière—Alma MP Claude Patry later defected to the Bloc Québécois after disagreeing with the NDP's position to amend the Clarity Act, another policy which was strongly promoted by Mulcair. The NDP did however manage to retain their seat in Victoria following the results of a close by-election.

Mulcair declared his party's support for trade deals that included enforceable provisions on labour rights and environmental protection. Mulcair favoured the Energy East pipeline proposal over other plans for the creation of the Keystone XL and Northern Gateway pipelines, arguing that a west-east pipeline would improve energy security and create more jobs in Canada. During a 2013 trip to the United States, Mulcair spoke to a business council about the NDP's priorities for sustainable development of the oil sands and noted that the Keystone pipeline should not be a priority. His comments attracted criticism from the Conservative government, which accused him of "trash talking" Canada.

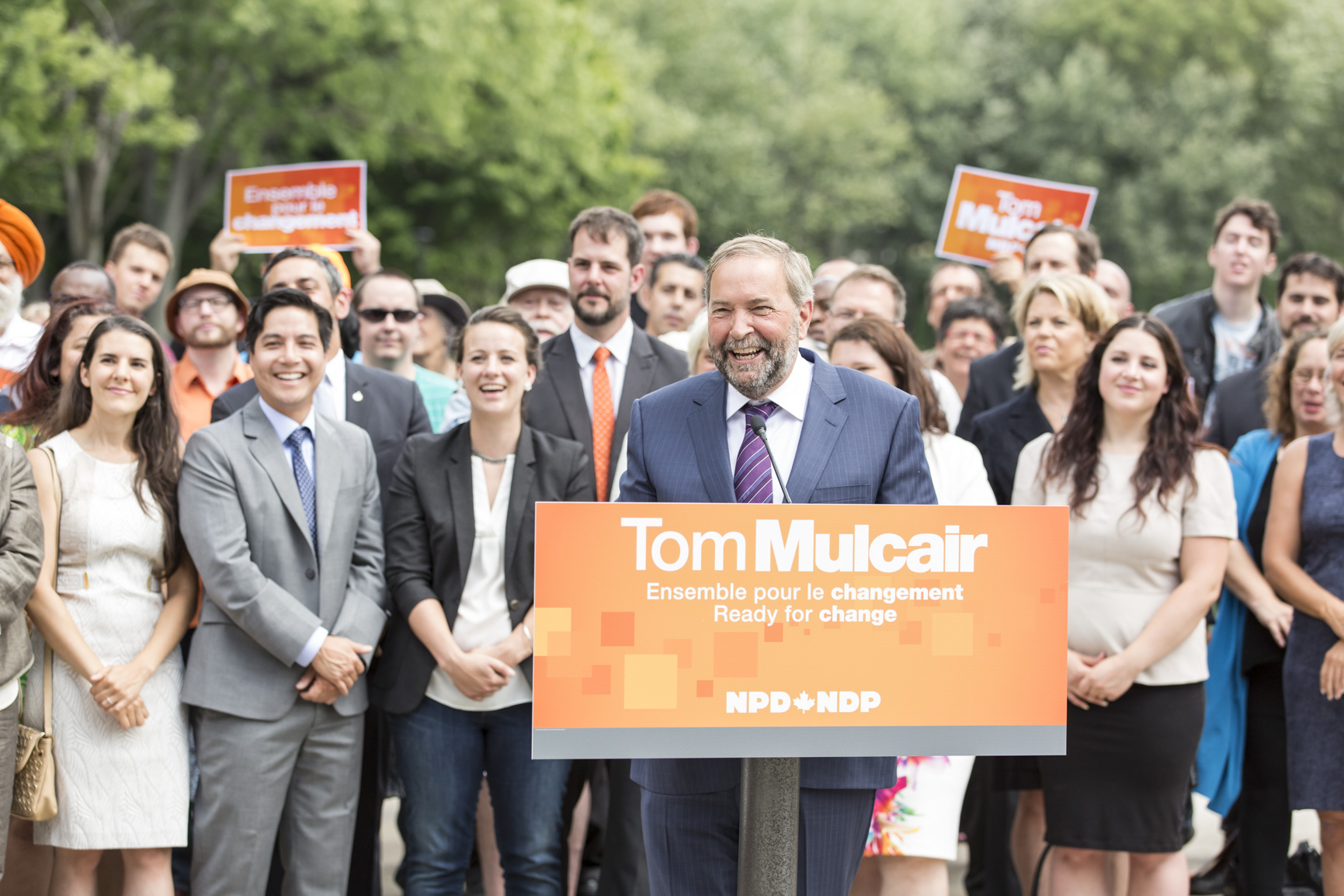
Tom Mulcair in Montreal with Quebec NDP MPs

During the Canadian Senate expenses scandal, the NDP reasserted its longstanding position that Senate should be abolished. Mulcair promised to seek a mandate for Senate abolition during the 2015 Canadian federal election even though the Supreme Court had ruled in 2014 that abolition would require the consent of all ten provinces.

Nevertheless, following the election of Justin Trudeau as Liberal leader in April 2013 the political fortunes of the NDP appeared to be on the decline, with the party falling back to its traditional third place in public opinion polls. The party would go on to lose a June 2014 by-election to the Liberals in the previously safe riding of Trinity—Spadina, which was made vacant following incumbent Olivia Chow's decision to run unsuccessfully in the 2014 Toronto mayoral election.

By May 2015, however, the NDP had managed to recover much of its lost ground in public opinion polling and was in a tight three-way race with both the Liberals and Conservatives. Commentators pegged several factors, including Mulcair's opposing stance against the Conservative's Bill C-51 which the Liberals agreed to support and the surprise win for the Alberta NDP in the 2015 Alberta provincial election, as having helped revive the federal party's lagging fortunes. The party also enjoyed success in getting two of its bills through the House at this time, the first of which abolished the so-called "tampon tax" on feminine hygiene products, while the second banned the use of "pay-to-pay" fees charged by banks, although the latter was later blocked from the House floor by the Conservatives.

==== 2015 federal election ====
Despite early campaign polls showing an NDP lead, the party lost 51 seats on election night and fell back to its former third place in Parliament. By winning 44 seats, Mulcair was still able to secure the second-best showing in terms of the number of seats compared to Ed Broadbent's 1988 election campaign. However, this was still a smaller percentage than Broadbent had won in 1988 due to the increased number of MPs now represented in the House of Commons.

During the election campaign, Mulcair's stance on the niqab issue contributed to a decline in the party's support in Quebec. Mulcair's dual citizenship also became an election issue, with a poll finding that 26 per cent of respondents said his dual citizenship would make them less likely to vote NDP.

Following the election, Mulcair was criticized by some NDP members for having run on a moderate platform and promised to balance the federal budget, whilst Trudeau's Liberals promised to run budget deficits to pay for social spending and economic stimulus programs; a position that was viewed as allowing the Liberals to outflank the NDP on the left of the political spectrum. Mulcair's NDP also opposed full legalization of cannabis, instead supporting decriminalization, further eroding support among younger voters. Overall, the NDP's 2015 campaign was viewed as overly cautious compared to the bold "change" campaign of the Liberals.

=== 2016 leadership review ===
At the NDP's party convention in April 2016, Mulcair was also criticized by Alberta delegates for what was seen as implicit support for the Leap Manifesto, a program which was seen as opposing Alberta's oil industry and thus a political threat to Rachel Notley's NDP government in Alberta. At the convention, 52 per cent of delegates voted for a leadership review motion to hold a leadership election within 24 months, marking the first time in Canadian federal politics that a leader was defeated in a confidence vote. Mulcair was asked by his caucus to remain as leader until his replacement was selected. His tenure as leader ended at the leadership election held October 1, 2017, with the election of Jagmeet Singh as Mulcair's successor.

In the days before the leadership vote, Mulcair confirmed his intention not to stand for parliament in the next federal election, expected in 2019, and suggested that he may resign his seat in the House of Commons as early as Christmas 2017 to accept one of the university appointments that had been offered to him.

Following the October 1, 2017, election of Jagmeet Singh as NDP leader, Mulcair was appointed energy critic in the NDP's shadow cabinet. Mulcair resigned as MP for Outremont on August 3, 2018. His seat was won by Rachel Bendayan of the Liberal Party at the triggered by-election. It was then retained with an increased majority at the 2019 general election.

== Post-political career (2017–present) ==
Mulcair announced on December 18, 2017, that he would resign from his House of Commons seat in June 2018, when the House rose for its summer break, to accept an appointment at a university. On January 11, 2018, Mulcair assumed the volunteer position of chair of the board of Jour de la terre Québec, a non-profit organization dedicated to environmental issues. Mulcair joined the political science department as a visiting professor at Universite de Montreal effective the summer of 2018.

On July 17, 2018, Mulcair also announced that he had accepted a position as political analyst on Montreal talk radio station CJAD effective August 28, 2018. He will also appear on CTV News Channel (owned by CJAD's parent company Bell Media) starting in fall 2018, and on the French-language network TVA in a similar capacity.

As a consultant hired by homeopathy giant Boiron, Mulcair launched in November 2019 the company’s public relations campaign to get the Quebec government to create a professional order for homeopaths. As homeopathy is considered a pseudoscience and its preparations are not effective for treating any medical condition, Mulcair’s involvement in the campaign and the new organization Quebec Coalition for Homeopathy has been criticized by several Canadian science communicators, such as Olivier Bernard, Alain Vadeboncoeur, Timothy Caulfield as well as McGill University’s Office for Science and Society.

After being voted out as NDP party leader, Mulcair criticized Singh's leadership of the NDP during the 2019 and 2025 federal elections. In 2020, he would also criticize Singh for calling Bloc Quebecois MP Alain Therrien a racist on the floor of the House of Commons.

Mulcair joined the Strategic Advisory Board of lobbying firm Wellington Advocacy in January 2026.

== Political positions ==
=== Abortion ===
Mulcair is pro-choice, and has stated at a conference in Quebec that people with an anti-abortion stance are not welcome to run for NDP, saying, "It's not debatable, it's not negotiable, it is a woman's right to determine her own health questions and her reproductive choices."

=== Economic policy ===
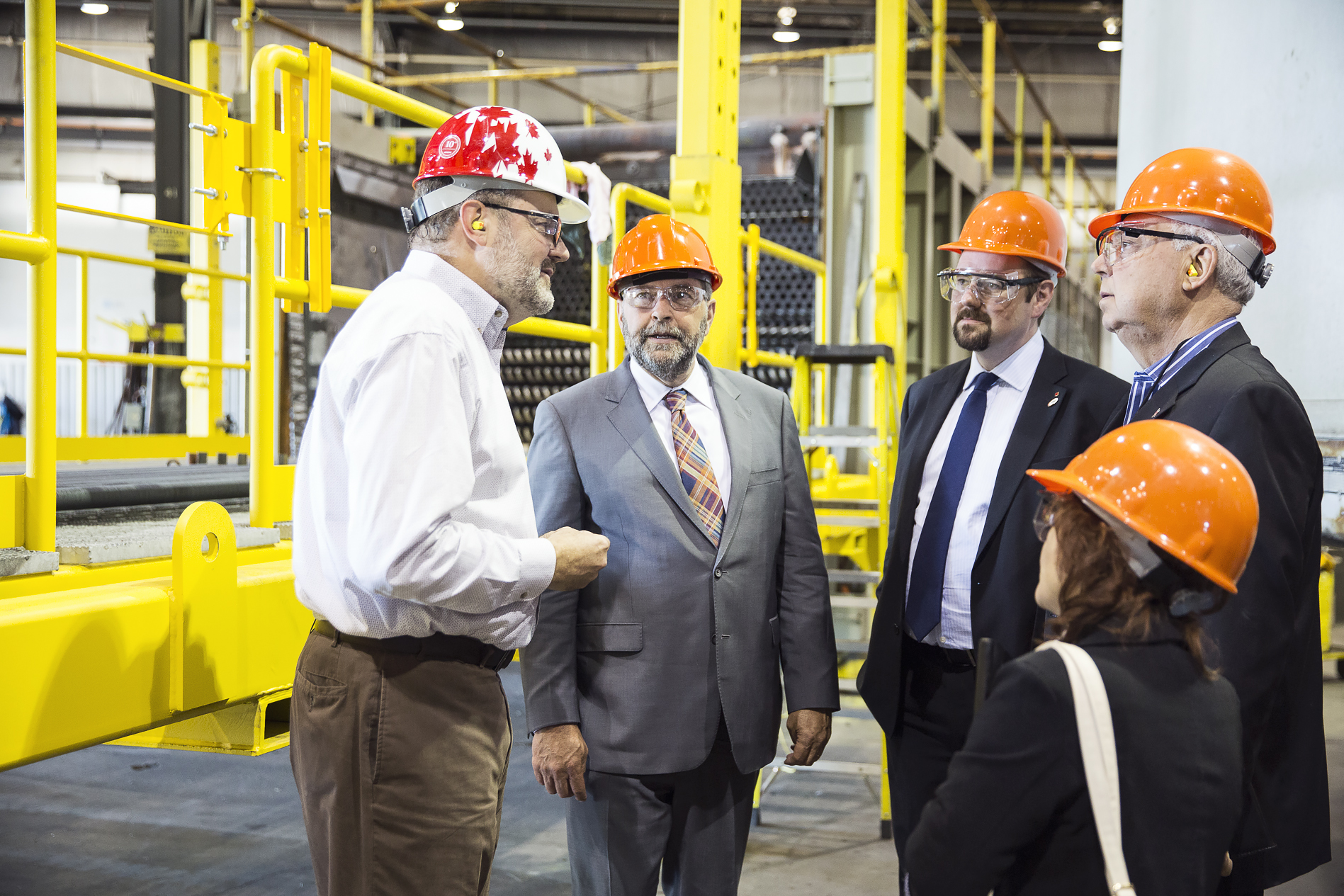
Tom Mulcair visiting Cambridge's Innovative Steam Technologies

Mulcair supports lowering the small business tax rate from 11 per cent to 9 per cent because they create "80% of all new jobs in this country". He said an NDP government would "create an innovation tax credit to encourage manufacturers to invest in machinery, equipment and property used in research and development".

Mulcair has proposed reversing some of the corporate tax cuts advanced by the Conservative government, while keeping taxes below the United States' combined corporate tax rate. Mulcair has stated that he will not raise personal income taxes, but has promised to cancel the Conservative government's income splitting for two-parent households.

Mulcair has promised to use additional tax revenue to pay for infrastructure, public transit, a new child care program, and a balanced budget.

=== Energy policy ===
Mulcair has promised to end fossil fuel subsidies under previous governments, and introduce cap-and-trade for carbon emissions. He has also promised to reverse cuts to the environmental review processes, and return to "rigorous, science-based environmental impact assessments".

Mulcair has argued that a west-east pipeline would improve energy security and create more jobs in Canada. He supported the Energy East pipeline proposal over plans for the creation of the Keystone XL and Northern Gateway pipelines.

=== Indigenous relations ===
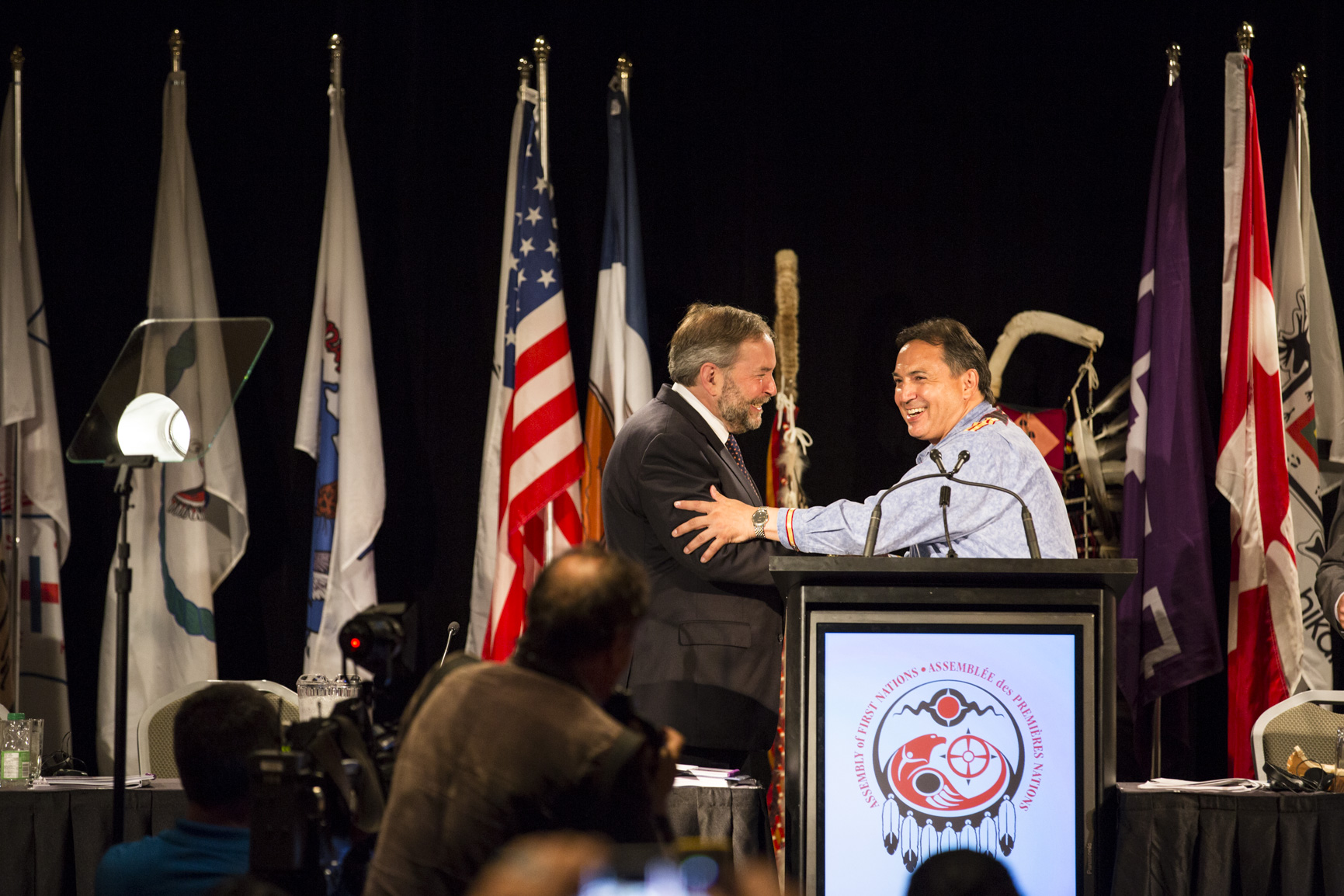
Tom Mulcair and Grand Chief Perry Bellegarde at the AFN General Assembly

In response to the Idle No More movement, Mulcair said that the NDP would put a filter on decisions made to ensure that they respect court rulings and international obligations to Indigenous peoples in Canada. He also pledged to call a national public inquiry into missing and murdered aboriginal women within 100 days of taking office, if his party is elected.

Mulcair called for a “nation-to-nation” relationship with Indigenous peoples following the Truth and Reconciliation Commission’s report on residential schools. He said his “number 1” priority would be to improve First Nations education.

=== Public safety ===
Mulcair has been critical of Conservative public safety policy, saying cuts to food inspection and aeronautical safety have put Canadians at risk. He also “criticized previous governments for allowing rail companies to police their own safety and called on Ottawa to take a more active role in doing that job” after the Lac Mégantic tragedy in Quebec.

Mulcair supports the longstanding NDP policy to decriminalize personal use of marijuana. Mulcair has stated that he does not believe that someone should serve jail time for minimal possession of marijuana; but he has also stated that he does not support legalization.

=== Women's issues ===
As NDP finance critic, Mulcair was critical of Stephen Harper’s 2009 budget because of “pay equity reforms which he said would remove the right of women to go to court to demand equal pay for work of equal value”. He said that “the NDP could never support a budget package that maintained that sort of measure”.

In 2014, as NDP leader, Mulcair announced that “an NDP government would launch a national public enquiry into missing and murdered aboriginal women within 100 days of taking office”. Mulcair believes that “only a full public inquiry would get to the root causes of violence against aboriginal women”.

=== Foreign policy ===
Mulcair believes that Canada can be a "positive force for peace, justice and respect for human rights around the world". During a policy speech in May 2015, Mulcair announced the NDP would "increase overall funding for development assistance and ensure that poverty alleviation remains at the centre of Canadian aid efforts".

Mulcair has been an opponent of Canada’s involvement in the combat mission in Iraq against ISIS.

In a 2008 interview, Mulcair said he is "an ardent supporter of Israel in all instances and circumstances". Progressive Canadian newspaper Rabble commented that given these statements were made in the context of the Israeli attacks on Gaza, they constituted a tacit support for Israeli war crimes. In 2014, an article in the Globe and Mail commented that Mulcair had a "personal commitment to the Zionist cause", given his wife's Jewish ancestry. In a 2012 interview, Mulcair said he favored a two-state solution. In the same interview, Mulcair said while he opposed Israeli settlements as contrary to international law, he nevertheless considers himself supporive of Israel. Mulcair called the pro-Palestinian Boycott, Divestment and Sanctions Movement against Israel as "grossly unacceptable". In the 2015 Canadian election, Mulcair blocked four NDP candidates who were critical of Israeli policies.

In a 2012 interview, Mulcair supported sanctions against Iran, but opposed a pre-emptive military attack on its nuclear program.

== Personal life ==
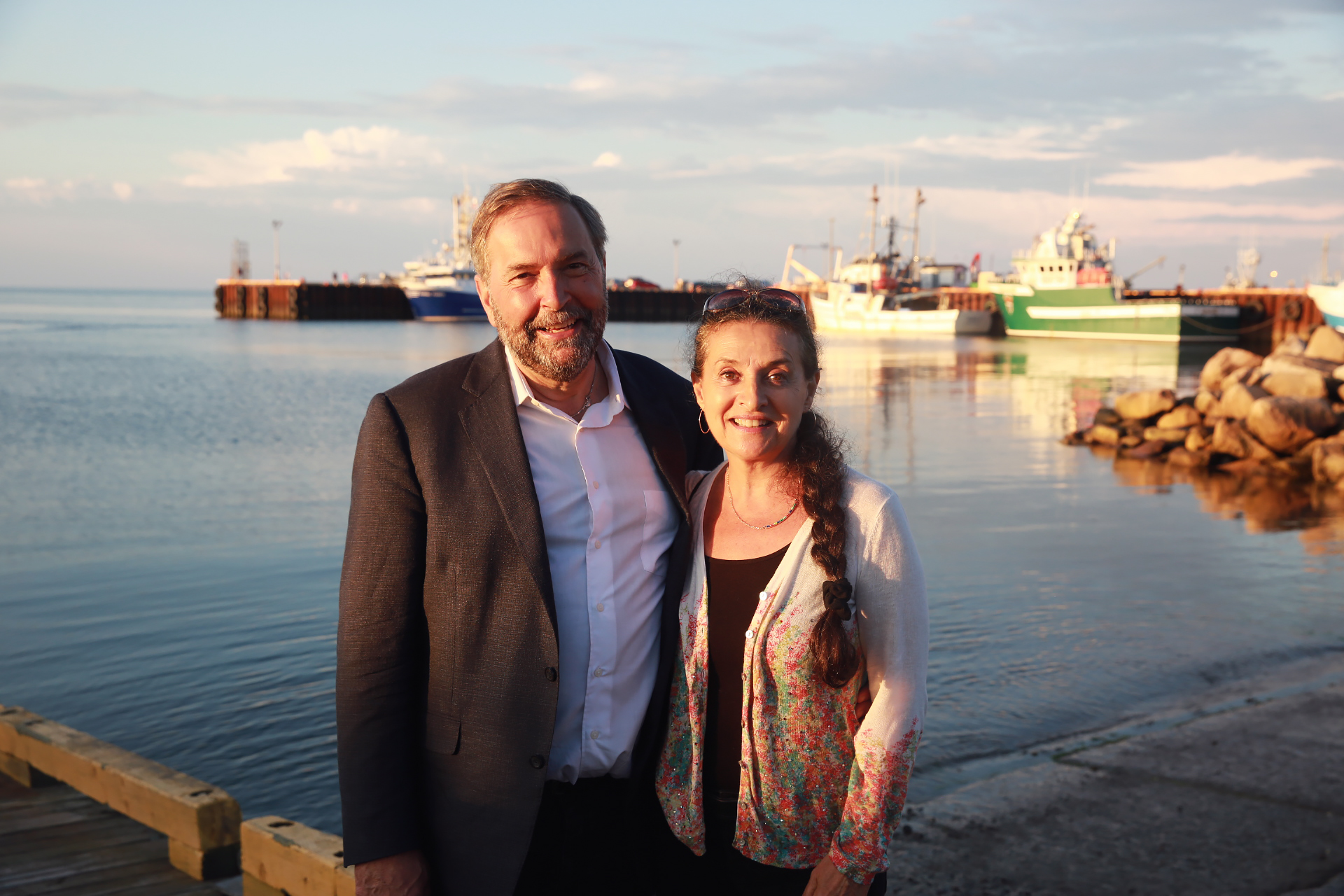
Tom Mulcair and wife Catherine Pinhas in New Brunswick, 2015

In 1976, Mulcair married Catherine Pinhas, a psychologist who was born in France to a Sephardic Jewish family from Turkey. The couple have two sons. The oldest, Matt, is a sergeant in the Sûreté du Québec (Quebec provincial police) and married to Jasmyne Côté, an elementary school teacher; they have two children, Juliette and Raphaël. Mulcair and Pinhas's second son, Greg, is an aerospace engineer who teaches physics and engineering technologies at John Abbott College and is married to Catherine Hamé, a municipal councillor; they have one son, Leonard.

Mulcair has dual Canadian and French citizenship, and is fluently bilingual in English and French. He calls himself "Tom" in English and "Thomas" in French. In 2019, Mulcair said that he had been using homeopathic remedies, considered a pseudoscience by mainstream science, for about 30 years.

== Electoral record ==
1994 Quebec general election: Chomedey
Party	Candidate	Votes	%	±%
Liberal	Thomas Mulcair	25,885	67.70	+14.31
Parti Québécois	Lidi Costache	9,239	24.16	−0.44
Action démocratique	Gaétane Piché	1,997	5.22	–
Equality	Gary Brown	353	0.92	−17.69
Economic	Richard Gagné	243	0.64	–
CANADA!	Benjamin Simhon	212	0.55	–
Commonwealth of Canada	John Ajemian	154	0.40	–
Natural Law	John Wolter	150	0.39	–

1998 Quebec general election: Chomedey
Party	Candidate	Votes	%	±%
Liberal	Thomas Mulcair	28,293	69.87	+2.17
Parti Québécois	Monia Prévost	8,869	21.90	−2.26
Action démocratique	Vicken Darakdjian	2,768	6.84	+1.62
Equality	Pierre Fortier	368	0.91	−0.01
Socialist Democracy	Jean-Pierre Roy	195	0.48	–

2003 Quebec general election: Chomedey
Party	Candidate	Votes	%	±%
Liberal	Thomas Mulcair	25,363	71.10	+1.23
Parti Québécois	Coline Chhay	6,568	18.41	−3.49
Action démocratique	Vicken Darakdjian	3,384	9.49	+2.65
Marxist–Leninist	Polyvios Tsakanikas	210	0.59	–
Equality	Robert Tamilia	148	0.41	−0.50

Canadian federal by-election, September 17, 2007: Outremont Resignation of Jean Lapierre
Party	Candidate	Votes	%	±%	Expenditures
New Democratic	Thomas Mulcair	11,374	47.50	+30.03	$76,194
Liberal	Jocelyn Coulon	6,933	28.96	−6.22	$72,539
Bloc Québécois	Jean-Paul Gilson	2,618	10.93	−18.08	$57,717
Conservative	Gilles Duguay	2,052	8.57	−4.16	$66,401
Green	François Pilon	529	2.21	−2.61	$169
neorhino.ca	François Yo Gourd	145	0.61	–	$1,774
Independent	Mahmood Raza Baig	78	0.33	–	$45
Independent	Jocelyne Leduc	61	0.25	–	$6
Independent	Romain Angeles	46	0.19	–	$157
Canadian Action	Alexandre Amirizian	45	0.19	–	$0
Independent	Régent Millette	32	0.13	+0.08	none listed
Independent	John Turmel	30	0.13	–	none listed
Total valid votes		23,943	100.00		
Total rejected ballots		175	0.73	+0.03	
Turnout		24,118	37.43	−23.35	
Electors on the lists		64,438			
New Democratic gain from Liberal		Swing		−18.3	

2008 Canadian federal election: Outremont
Party	Candidate	Votes	%	±%	Expenditures
New Democratic	Tom Mulcair	14,348	39.53	−7.97	$69,072
Liberal	Sébastien Dhavernas	12,005	33.08	+4.12	$45,118
Bloc Québécois	Marcela Valdivia	4,554	12.55	+1.62	$48,279
Conservative	Lulzim Laloshi	3,820	10.53	+1.96	$25,770
Green	François Pilon	1,566	4.31	+2.10	not listed
Total valid votes		36,293	100.00		
Total rejected ballots		253	0.69		
Turnout		36,546	56.11	+18.68	
Electors on the lists		64,556			
New Democratic hold		Swing		−6.05	
Source: Official Voting Results, 40th General Election 2008, Elections Canada. Percentage change totals are in relation to a 2007 by-election, not to the previous general election.

2011 Canadian federal election: Outremont
Party	Candidate	Votes	%	±%	Expenditures
New Democratic	Tom Mulcair	21,906	56.37	+16.84	$80,457
Liberal	Martin Cauchon	9,204	23.69	−9.39	$51,130
Conservative	Rodolphe Husny	3,408	8.77	−1.76	$18,319
Bloc Québécois	Élise Daoust	3,199	8.23	−4.32	$10,456
Green	François Pilon	838	2.16	−2.15	$4,578
Rhinoceros	Tommy Gaudet	160	0.41	–	
Communist	Johan Boyden	143	0.37	–	
Total valid votes		38,858	100.00		
Total rejected ballots		291	0.74	+0.05	
Turnout		39,149	60.46	+4.35	
Electors on the lists		65,573			
Source: Official Voting Results, 41st General Election 2011, Elections Canada

NDP Federal Leadership Election, 2012
Candidate	First Ballot	%	Second Ballot	%	Third Ballot	%	Fourth Ballot	%
Thomas Mulcair	19,728	30.30	23,902	38.25	27,488	43.82	33,881	57.22
Brian Topp	13,915	21.37	15,624	25.0	19,822	31.6	25,329	42.78
Nathan Cullen	10,671	16.39	12,449	19.92	15,426	24.59	eliminated	
Peggy Nash	8,353	12.83	10,519	16.83	eliminated			
Paul Dewar	4,883	7.50	withdrew					
Martin Singh	3,821	5.87	withdrew					
Niki Ashton	3,737	5.74	eliminated					
Romeo Saganash	withdrew							
Total	65,108	100	62,494	100	62,736	100	59,210	100

2015 Canadian federal election: Outremont
Party	Candidate	Votes	%	±%	Expenditures
New Democratic	Thomas Mulcair	19,242	44.11	-11.57	–
Liberal	Rachel Bendayan	14,597	33.46	+11.84	–
Conservative	Rodolphe Husny	4,159	9.53	+1.55	–
Bloc Québécois	Roger Galland Barou	3,668	8.41	-3.20	–
Green	Amara Diallo	1,575	3.61	+1.37	–
Libertarian	Francis Pouliot	216	0.50	–	–
Communist	Adrien Welsh	162	0.37	–	–
Total valid votes/Expense limit		43,619	100.00	–	$204,392.06
Total rejected ballots		426	0.97	–	–
Turnout		44,045	62.42	–	–
Eligible voters		70,559	–	–	–
Source: Elections Canada
