= Quebec Coalition for Homeopathy =

Canadian group promoting homeopathy

The Quebec Coalition for Homeopathy is an astroturfing organization founded in 2019 by homeopathy giant Boiron to argue for the creation of a professional order for homeopaths in the Canadian province of Quebec.

== Composition ==
The homeopathy company hired former Canadian politician Tom Mulcair to promote the group. In addition to Boiron, the coalition is composed of distributors of homeopathic products (Homeocan, Bio Lonreco, Distripharm, Harbasanté, Schmidt Nagel, Hylands), Quebec's trade union for homeopaths, the Canadian Homeopathic Pharmaceutical Association, the Homeopathy Research Institute, as well as a support group for homeopathy founded on the same day. The group's objectives have been denounced by McGill University's Office for Science and Society and by several Canadian science communicators, who insist homeopathy is a pseudoscience that is not known to be effective for treating any medical condition.

The Syndicat professionnel des homéopathes du Québec has been asking the provincial government to establish a professional order for homeopaths as far back as 1993.
