= Madeleine Féquière =

Quebec politician

Madeleine Féquière MNA

Member of the National Assembly for Chomedey
- Incumbent
- Assumed office October 5, 2026
- Preceded by: Sona Lakhoyan Olivier

Personal details
- Party: Quebec Liberal Party

Madeleine Féquière is a member of the Quebec Liberal Party who was elected in the electoral district of Chomedey.

Féquière was the Consul General of Canada in Chicago.
