= Guy Ouellette =

Canadian politician

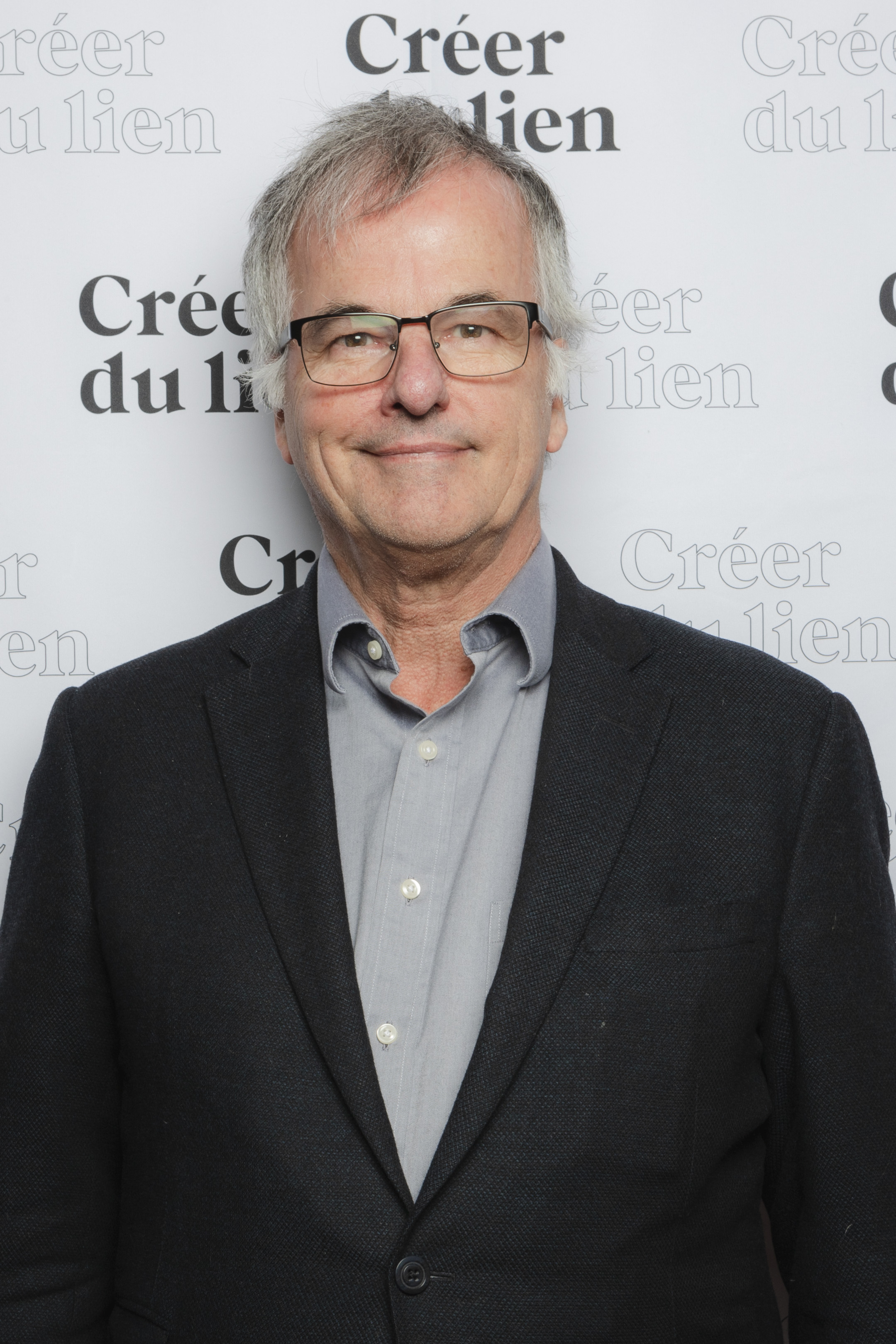
- Ouellette in 2023

Member of the National Assembly of Quebec for Chomedey
- In office March 26, 2007 – August 28, 2022
- Preceded by: Tom Mulcair
- Succeeded by: Sona Lakhoyan Olivier

Personal details
- Born: December 13, 1951 (age 74) Sherbrooke, Quebec
- Party: Independent
- Other political affiliations: Quebec Liberal Party (2007-2018)
- Profession: police officer, author
- Portfolio: Public Safety

Guy Ouellette (born December 13, 1951) is a Quebec politician from Canada, police officer and author. He was the Member of National Assembly of Quebec for the riding of Chomedey in Laval from 2007 to 2022. Elected as the candidate of the Quebec Liberal Party, he was expelled from the party caucus in October 2018 for purportedly leaking classified information to the then-opposition Coalition Avenir Québec.

Ouellette worked for the Sûreté du Québec police force for over 30 years. He was a police officer, a corporal and a sergeant. He worked for several years in the department of organized crime, and was involved in cases involving biker gangs. He was part of the Carcajou tactical team, which was created in 1995 in the midst of a violent biker gang war and following the death of an 11-year-old boy in Montreal after an explosion that was targeting several members of a biker gang. He also published a book about Hells Angels kingpin Maurice Boucher in 2005.

Ouellette was elected in Chomedey in 2007, replacing Tom Mulcair. He was named parliamentary secretary to the Minister of Public Security, Jacques Dupuis.

Ouellette was arrested on October 25, 2017, by a special police force investigating the leak of confidential documents.

== Published books ==
- Mom (2005) - book about Hells Angels leader Maurice "Mom" Boucher
