= Sona Lakhoyan Olivier =

Canadian politician

- Sona Lakhoyan Olivier in 2026

Member of the National Assembly of Quebec for Chomedey
- In office October 3, 2022 – August 27, 2026
- Preceded by: Guy Ouellette
- Succeeded by: Madeleine Féquière

Personal details
- Born: July 10, 1961 (age 65) Beirut, Lebanon
- Party: Independent
- Other political affiliations: Quebec Liberal Party (until 2026)
- Education: Concordia University

Sona Lakhoyan Olivier (born July 10, 1961) is a Canadian politician who represented Chomedey in the National Assembly of Quebec from 2022 to 2026. She was elected as a member of the Quebec Liberal Party (QLP) and has been an independent since December 2025.

== Early life and family ==
Lakhoyan Olivier was born in Beirut, Lebanon, in 1961 to parents of Armenian origin who were born in Aleppo, Syria.

She spent her early years in Lebanon before immigrating to Quebec with her family at the age of 15. She later married Marc Olivier in 1995 and has two daughters.

== Education and professional career ==
Lakhoyan Olivier studied at Concordia University, where she obtained a bachelor's degree in political science with a minor in languages. She subsequently pursued graduate studies in public administration.

Before entering politics full-time, she worked at the Casino de Montréal from 1993 to 2019, first as an administrative host, and later worked in online gaming at Loto-Québec from 2019 until her election in 2022.

== Community involvement ==
Lakhoyan Olivier has held several positions in community and public organizations in Laval. She served as an elected commissioner of the Commission scolaire de Laval from 2007 to 2014 and as vice-president of the board of directors of the Fondation Cité de la Santé de Laval from 2011 to 2013.

== Athletics ==
Lakhoyan Olivier was involved in athletics through the Armenian General Athletic Union and Scouts (Homenetmen Gamk) in Montreal, competing primarily in the 400 metres, 800 metres and 1500 metres. She later coached athletics with the organization and participated in organizing the 2018 Armenian Olympics in Laval.

She subsequently served as president of the organization until 2019, becoming the first woman to hold the position.

== Political career ==
Lakhoyan Olivier was involved with the Quebec Liberal Party (PLQ) for many years before becoming a candidate herself. She first became active with the party's youth wing and the Liberal riding association in Laurier-Dorion, then represented by Christos Sirros. She later continued her political involvement in Chomedey, becoming vice-president of the Chomedey Liberal Association in 2007, a position she held until 2018. During this period, she was involved in five provincial election campaigns for the PLQ candidate in Chomedey, Guy Ouellette.

In 2013, Lakhoyan Olivier also entered municipal politics, running for a seat on Laval city council in the Saint-Martin district. Initially a candidate for the Nouveau Parti des Lavallois, she left the party during the campaign and continued her candidacy as an independent. Although she was not elected, she remained involved in politics and later sought the Quebec Liberal nomination in Chomedey ahead of the 2022 provincial election.

Chomedey had long been considered a stronghold of the Quebec Liberal Party, and contested Liberal nomination races in the riding were rare. Ahead of the 2022 Quebec general election, however, five candidates competed for the party's nomination. At the nomination meeting on August 8, 2022, 1,106 members of the Chomedey riding association were eligible to vote. After three rounds of balloting, Lakhoyan Olivier was selected by local party members as the Liberal candidate, receiving 51.5 per cent of the vote.

=== First term in the National Assembly (2022–2026) ===
Lakhoyan Olivier was elected to the National Assembly of Quebec on October 3, 2022, becoming the member for Chomedey. She received 11,895 votes (36.52%), defeating Coalition Avenir Québec candidate George Platanitis by 3,199 votes.

During her first term, she held the following parliamentary and opposition positions:

- Official Opposition critic for tourism, October 27, 2022 – December 4, 2025;
- Official Opposition critic responsible for the Lanaudière region, October 27, 2022 – December 4, 2025;
- Official Opposition critic responsible for the Laurentides region, October 27, 2022 – December 4, 2025;
- Member of the Office of the National Assembly, December 1, 2022 – October 1, 2025;
- Member of the Committee on Labour and the Economy, December 2, 2022 – July 7, 2025;
- Vice-chair of the National Assembly Delegation for Relations with Kyoto, February 20, 2023 – December 4, 2025;
- Vice-chair of the National Assembly Delegation for Relations with Shandong, February 20, 2023 – September 16, 2025;
- Vice-chair of the Committee on Institutions, July 7, 2025 – December 4, 2025;
- Official Opposition critic responsible for the Laval region, August 19, 2025 – December 4, 2025.

During her term, Lakhoyan Olivier spoke several times in the National Assembly on issues affecting Quebec's cultural communities. In 2023, 2024 and 2025, she made statements marking Tamil Genocide Remembrance Day, referring to the Mullivaikkal massacre and the effects of the Sri Lankan Civil War on the Tamil community.

She has also spoken in the National Assembly about the Armenian genocide. On April 24, 2024, while presenting a motion commemorating the genocide, she noted that it was the first time the motion had been presented by a member of the Assembly of Armenian origin.

In 2026, Lakhoyan Olivier called for the development of a Quebec-wide women's health policy, including greater investment in university and hospital research and a preventive and longitudinal approach to women's health.

In November 2025, Lakhoyan Olivier's name became associated with the so-called "brownies" controversy surrounding the 2025 Quebec Liberal leadership race after media outlets published text messages suggesting that money had been offered in exchange for leadership votes. Messages were attributed to Lakhoyan Olivier and Coalition Avenir Québec MNA Alice Abou-Khalil, both of whom denied involvement. An independent investigation led by retired Quebec Superior Court justice Jacques R. Fournier subsequently concluded that the published messages constituted a montage of other messages and found no evidence that Lakhoyan Olivier or Abou-Khalil had participated in the alleged exchange. A separate investigation by Quebec's anti-corruption unit, Unité permanente anticorruption (UPAC), remained ongoing.

On December 4, 2025, Lakhoyan Olivier was provisionally excluded from the Quebec Liberal caucus following the launch of an investigation by the National Assembly's Ethics Commissioner.

On May 7, 2026, the Ethics Commissioner found that Lakhoyan Olivier had committed breaches of the National Assembly's Code of Ethics and recommended an $8,000 financial penalty. On May 26, the National Assembly unanimously approved the penalty.

Following the report, Quebec Liberal leader Charles Milliard announced that Lakhoyan Olivier would not be readmitted to the Liberal caucus and would not be permitted to run as a Liberal candidate in the 2026 election. Milliard also called for the immediate and permanent revocation of her party membership and for a complete restructuring of the Chomedey Liberal riding association's executive, including the replacement of its president.

Later in the 2026 election campaign, some Liberal candidates, organizers and activists publicly expressed concerns about the party's direction and electoral strategy under Milliard.

Lakhoyan Olivier continued serving as the independent MNA for Chomedey and remained involved in community activities. In July 2026, she organized a recognition evening attended by more than 140 representatives of community organizations, cultural communities, volunteers, partners and local leaders. The event was intended to recognize their contributions to community life in Chomedey. The event raised $3,775 for the Fondation Cité de la Santé de Laval; Lakhoyan Olivier pledged to match the amount raised and announced an additional $5,000 grant through Quebec's volunteer action support program.

=== 2026 Quebec general election campaign ===
Lakhoyan Olivier's campaign logo for the 2026 Quebec general election

Lakhoyan Olivier is seeking a second term in Chomedey as an independent candidate in the 2026 Quebec general election.

In an interview with The Laval News, Lakhoyan Olivier said that serving as an independent allowed her to act more directly on issues affecting Chomedey and to take positions without having to conform to a party line.

Her campaign emphasizes political independence and direct representation of Chomedey residents. Her campaign website states that no independent candidate has been elected as an MNA in a Quebec provincial general election since 1966.

Lakhoyan Olivier has also proposed using online consultations to allow Chomedey residents to express their views on selected issues and to inform her decisions in the National Assembly. Her campaign identifies local economic development and entrepreneurship, green spaces and community safety, and responsive bilingual public services among its priorities.

Her independent candidacy has also been discussed by community media. An article published by Yalla Magazine discussed her candidacy in the broader context of independent candidates, noting both the greater autonomy associated with operating outside a party structure and the organizational disadvantages faced by independent candidates.

== Electoral record ==
=== Provincial ===
2026 Quebec general election: Chomedey
Party	Candidate	Votes	%	±%
Liberal	Madeleine Féquière	12,807	45.17	+6.59
Conservative	Leon Der Stepanian	5,116	18.04	–3.67
Parti Québécois	Marie-Jeanne Rivest	3,761	13.26	+6.84
Québec solidaire	Geru Schneider	2,916	10.29	+2.09
Coalition Avenir Québec	Cattiouceca Ambroise	2,522	8.89	–14.30
Independent	Sona Lakhoyan Olivier	952	3.36	N/A
Canadian	Jonathan Gray	281	0.99	N/A
Total valid votes		28,356	98.17	–0.38
Total rejected ballots		529	1.83	+0.38
Turnout		28,885	50.50	–4.02
Electors on the lists		57,202		
Liberal notional hold		Swing		+5.13
Source: Élections Québec

2022 Quebec general election: Chomedey
Party	Candidate	Votes	%	±%
Liberal	Sona Lakhoyan Olivier	11,895	36.52	-16.16
Coalition Avenir Québec	George Platanitis	8,696	26.70	+0.29
Conservative	Konstantinos Merakos	6,467	19.85	+16.28
Québec solidaire	Zachary Robert	2,570	7.89	+0.82
Parti Québécois	Rachid Bandou	2,343	7.19	-0.39
Green	Sahbi Nablia	311	0.95	-0.82
Bloc Montreal	Federica Gangai	290	0.89	–
Total valid votes		32,572	98.55	
Total rejected ballots		479	1.45	
Turnout		33,051	54.52	+0.5
Electors on the lists		60,626		
Liberal hold		Swing		–

=== Municipal ===
In the 2013 Laval municipal election, Lakhoyan Olivier ran as an independent candidate for city council and received 6.73 per cent of the vote.
