= Chomedey (electoral district) =

Provincial electoral district in Quebec, Canada

Quebec electoral district
- Location in Laval

Provincial electoral district
- Legislature: National Assembly of Quebec
MNA
Madeleine Féquière
Liberal
- District created: 1980
- First contested: 1981
- Last contested: 2026

Demographics
- Population (2006): 70,915
- Electors (2014): 58,464
- Area (km²): 22.7
- Pop. density (per km²): 3,124
- Census division: Laval (part)
- Census subdivision: Laval (part)

Chomedey (French pronunciation: [ʃɔmede]) is a provincial electoral district in Quebec, Canada, that elects members to the National Assembly of Quebec. It is located in the western part of Laval. It takes in part of the Chomedey neighbourhood. It includes most of the territory bounded by the Rivière des Prairies to the south, Autoroute 15 to the east, Autoroute 440 to the north and Autoroute 13 to the west.

It was created for the 1981 election from parts of Fabre and Laval electoral districts.

In the change from the 2001 to the 2011 electoral map, it lost some territory to Fabre. In the change from the 2011 to 2017 electoral map, it will lose some more territory to Fabre, in the area around Parc Le Boutillier.

The district is named after Paul de Chomedey, Sieur de Maisonneuve, who founded Ville-Marie (now Montreal) in 1642.

Sona Lakhoyan Olivier was expelled from the liberal caucus on December 4, 2025.

== Members of the National Assembly ==
| Legislature | Years | Member | Party |
|---|---|---|---|
Riding created from Fabre and Laval
| 32nd | 1981–1985 | Lise Bacon | Liberal |
| 33rd | 1985–1989 | Lise Bacon | Liberal |
| 34th | 1989–1994 | Lise Bacon | Liberal |
| 35th | 1994–1998 | Thomas Mulcair | Liberal |
| 36th | 1998–2003 | Thomas Mulcair | Liberal |
| 37th | 2003–2007 | Thomas Mulcair | Liberal |
| 38th | 2007–2008 | Guy Ouellette | Liberal |
| 39th | 2008–2012 | Guy Ouellette | Liberal |
| 40th | 2012–2014 | Guy Ouellette | Liberal |
| 41st | 2014–2018 | Guy Ouellette | Liberal |
| 42nd | 2018–2018 | Guy Ouellette | Liberal |
| 42nd | 2018–2022 | Guy Ouellette | Independent |
| 43rd | 2022–2025 | Sona Lakhoyan Olivier | Liberal |
| 43rd | 2025–2026 | Sona Lakhoyan Olivier | Independent |
| 44th | 2026–Present | Madeleine Féquière | Liberal |

== Election results ==
2026 Quebec general election
| Party | Candidate | Votes | % | ±% |
|---|---|---|---|---|
| Liberal | Madeleine Féquière | 12,807 | 45.17 | +6.59 |
| Conservative | Leon Der Stepanian | 5,116 | 18.04 | –3.67 |
| Parti Québécois | Marie-Jeanne Rivest | 3,761 | 13.26 | +6.84 |
| Québec solidaire | Geru Schneider | 2,916 | 10.29 | +2.09 |
| Coalition Avenir Québec | Cattiouceca Ambroise | 2,522 | 8.89 | –14.30 |
| Independent | Sona Lakhoyan Olivier | 952 | 3.36 | N/A |
| Canadian | Jonathan Gray | 281 | 0.99 | N/A |
| Total valid votes | | 28,356 | 98.17 | –0.38 |
| Total rejected ballots | | 529 | 1.83 | +0.38 |
| Turnout | | 28,885 | 50.50 | –4.02 |
| Electors on the lists | | 57,202 | | |
| Liberal notional hold | | Swing | | +5.13 |
Source: Élections Québec

2022 Quebec general election redistributed results
| Party | Vote | % |
|---|---|---|
| Liberal | 10,638 | 38.58 |
| Coalition Avenir Québec | 6,396 | 23.19 |
| Conservative | 5,986 | 21.71 |
| Québec solidaire | 2,261 | 8.20 |
| Parti Québécois | 1,770 | 6.42 |
| Others | 524 | 1.90 |

2022 Quebec general election
| Party | Candidate | Votes | % | ±% |
|---|---|---|---|---|
| Liberal | Sona Lakhoyan Olivier | 11,895 | 36.52 | -16.16 |
| Coalition Avenir Québec | George Platanitis | 8,696 | 26.70 | +0.29 |
| Conservative | Konstantinos Merakos | 6,467 | 19.85 | +16.28 |
| Québec solidaire | Zachary Robert | 2,570 | 7.89 | +0.82 |
| Parti Québécois | Rachid Bandou | 2,343 | 7.19 | -0.39 |
| Green | Sahbi Nablia | 311 | 0.95 | -0.82 |
| Bloc Montreal | Federica Gangai | 290 | 0.89 | – |
| Total valid votes | | 32,572 | 98.55 | |
| Total rejected ballots | | 479 | 1.45 | |
| Turnout | | 33,051 | 54.52 | +0.5 |
| Electors on the lists | | 60,626 | | |
| Liberal hold | | Swing | | – |

2018 Quebec general election
| Party | Candidate | Votes | % | ±% |
|---|---|---|---|---|
| Liberal | Guy Ouellette | 15,982 | 52.68 | -14.34 |
| Coalition Avenir Québec | Alice Abou-Khalil | 8,014 | 26.41 | +15.3 |
| Parti Québécois | Ouerdia Nacera Beddad | 2,301 | 7.58 | -3.91 |
| Québec solidaire | Rabah Moulla | 2,144 | 7.07 | +4.29 |
| Conservative | Nick Keramarios | 1,084 | 3.57 | – |
| Green | Fatine Kabbaj | 538 | 1.77 | +0.94 |
| New Democratic | Omar El-Harrache | 276 | 0.91 | – |
| Total valid votes | | 30,339 | 98.30 | |
| Total rejected ballots | | 526 | 1.70 | |
| Turnout | | 30,865 | 54.02 | -18.27 |
| Eligible voters | | 57,131 | | |
| Liberal hold | | Swing | | -14.82 |
Source(s) "Rapport des résultats officiels du scrutin". Élections Québec.

2014 Quebec general election
| Party | Candidate | Votes | % | ±% |
|---|---|---|---|---|
| Liberal | Guy Ouellette | 30,604 | 73.02 | +15.78 |
| Parti Québécois | Jean Cooke | 4,816 | 11.49 | -5.09 |
| Coalition Avenir Québec | Carlie Dejoie | 4,658 | 11.11 | -8.18 |
| Québec solidaire | Lise-Anne Rhéaume | 1,164 | 2.78 | -0.78 |
| Green | Brendan Edge | 347 | 0.83 | -0.91 |
| Bloc Pot | Emily Gagnon | 191 | 0.46 | – |
| Option nationale | Patrick Simard | 130 | 0.31 | -0.58 |
| Total valid votes | | 41,910 | 99.17 | – |
| Total rejected ballots | | 352 | 0.83 | -0.25 |
| Turnout | | 42,262 | 72.29 | +4.38 |
| Electors on the lists | | 58,464 | – | – |
| Liberal hold | | Swing | | +10.43 |

2012 Quebec general election
| Party | Candidate | Votes | % | ±% |
|---|---|---|---|---|
| Liberal | Guy Ouellette | 21,893 | 57.24 | −8.88 |
| Coalition Avenir Québec | Marielle Potvin | 7,379 | 19.29 | +11.63* |
| Parti Québécois | Jean Cooke | 6,340 | 16.58 | −4.44 |
| Québec solidaire | Francine Bellerose | 1,362 | 3.56 | +1.36 |
| Green | Stéphanie Stevenson | 663 | 1.73 | −0.74 |
| Option nationale | Patrick Simard | 341 | 0.89 | – |
| Independent | Kamal Germanos Lutfi | 267 | 0.70 | – |
| Total valid votes | | 38,245 | 98.92 | – |
| Total rejected ballots | | 418 | 1.08 | – |
| Turnout | | 38,663 | 67.91 | +22.70 |
| Electors on the lists | | 56,933 | – | – |
* Result compared to Action démocratique

2008 Quebec general election
| Party | Candidate | Votes | % | ±% |
|---|---|---|---|---|
| Liberal | Guy Ouellette | 16,702 | 66.12 | +11.37 |
| Parti Québécois | Jonathan Cyr | 5,310 | 21.02 | +5.83 |
| Action démocratique | Josée Granger | 1,936 | 7.66 | −15.59 |
| Green | Christian Picard | 625 | 2.47 | −1.16 |
| Québec solidaire | Francine Bellerose | 556 | 2.20 | +0.20 |
| Marxist–Leninist | Polyvios Tsakanikas | 133 | 0.53 | +0.23 |
| Total valid votes | | 25,262 | 98.90 | |
| Total rejected ballots | | 281 | 1.10 | |
| Turnout | | 25,543 | 45.21 | −17.69 |
| Electors on the lists | | 56,503 | | |

2007 Quebec general election
| Party | Candidate | Votes | % | ±% |
|---|---|---|---|---|
| Liberal | Guy Ouellette | 18,667 | 54.75 | −16.35 |
| Action démocratique | Phani Papachristou | 7,929 | 23.25 | +13.31 |
| Parti Québécois | Joëlle Quérin | 5,180 | 15.19 | −3.22 |
| Green | Jean Martin | 1,237 | 3.63 | – |
| Québec solidaire | Francine Bellerose | 683 | 2.00 | – |
| No designation | Noemia Onofre de Lima | 299 | 0.88 | – |
| Marxist–Leninist | Polyvios Tsakanikas | 103 | 0.30 | −0.29 |
| Total valid votes | | 34,098 | 99.02 | |
| Total rejected ballots | | 338 | 0.98 | |
| Turnout | | 34,436 | 62.90 | −3.96 |
| Electors on the lists | | 54,746 | | |

2003 Quebec general election
| Party | Candidate | Votes | % | ±% |
|---|---|---|---|---|
| Liberal | Thomas Mulcair | 25,363 | 71.10 | +1.23 |
| Parti Québécois | Coline Chhay | 6,568 | 18.41 | −3.49 |
| Action démocratique | Vicken Darakdjian | 3,384 | 9.49 | +2.65 |
| Marxist–Leninist | Polyvios Tsakanikas | 210 | 0.59 | – |
| Equality | Robert Tamilia | 148 | 0.41 | −0.50 |

1998 Quebec general election
| Party | Candidate | Votes | % | ±% |
|---|---|---|---|---|
| Liberal | Thomas Mulcair | 28,293 | 69.87 | +2.17 |
| Parti Québécois | Monia Prévost | 8,869 | 21.90 | −2.26 |
| Action démocratique | Vicken Darakdjian | 2,768 | 6.84 | +1.62 |
| Equality | Pierre Fortier | 368 | 0.91 | −0.01 |
| Socialist Democracy | Jean-Pierre Roy | 195 | 0.48 | – |

1995 Quebec referendum
| Side | Votes | % |
|---|---|---|
| Non | 29,998 | 72.62 |
| Oui | 11,311 | 27.38 |
| Total valid votes | 41,309 | 88.39 |
| Total rejected ballots | 5,426 | 11.61 |

1994 Quebec general election
| Party | Candidate | Votes | % | ±% |
|---|---|---|---|---|
| Liberal | Thomas Mulcair | 25,885 | 67.70 | +14.31 |
| Parti Québécois | Lidi Costache | 9,239 | 24.16 | −0.44 |
| Action démocratique | Gaétane Piché | 1,997 | 5.22 | – |
| Equality | Gary Brown | 353 | 0.92 | −17.69 |
| Economic | Richard Gagné | 243 | 0.64 | – |
| CANADA! | Benjamin Simhon | 212 | 0.55 | – |
| Commonwealth of Canada | John Ajemian | 154 | 0.40 | – |
| Natural Law | John Wolter | 150 | 0.39 | – |

1992 Charlottetown Accord referendum
| Side | Votes | % |
|---|---|---|
| Oui | 26,209 | 67.30 |
| Non | 12,736 | 32.70 |

1989 Quebec general election
| Party | Candidate | Votes | % | ±% |
|---|---|---|---|---|
| Liberal | Lise Bacon | 16,895 | 53.39 | -19.27 |
| Parti Québécois | Bruno Trudelle | 7,783 | 24.60 | +1.68 |
| Equality | Jean-Paul Barbucci | 5,889 | 18.61 | – |
| New Democratic | Monique Durand | 501 | 1.58 | -1.10 |
| United Social Credit | Léopold Milton | 98 | 0.31 | -0.04 |

1985 Quebec general election
| Party | Candidate | Votes | % | ±% |
|---|---|---|---|---|
| Liberal | Lise Bacon | 21,622 | 72.66 | +6.42 |
| Parti Québécois | Joseph Xénopoulos | 6,822 | 22.92 | -9.12 |
| New Democratic | Norman Buchbinder | 799 | 2.68 | – |
| Parti indépendantiste | Lucien Chevalier | 336 | 1.13 | – |
| United Social Credit | Léopold Milton | 103 | 0.35 | – |
| Christian Socialist | Fabien Rivest | 77 | 0.26 | – |

1981 Quebec general election
| Party | Candidate | Votes | % |
|---|---|---|---|
| Liberal | Lise Bacon | 20,933 | 66.24 |
| Parti Québécois | Judy Ann Scott | 10,125 | 32.04 |
| Union Nationale | Gérard Léo Lortie | 543 | 1.72 |

== See also ==
- List of Quebec provincial electoral districts
- Canadian provincial electoral districts
