= Alain Vadeboncoeur =

Canadian emergency physician and science communicator

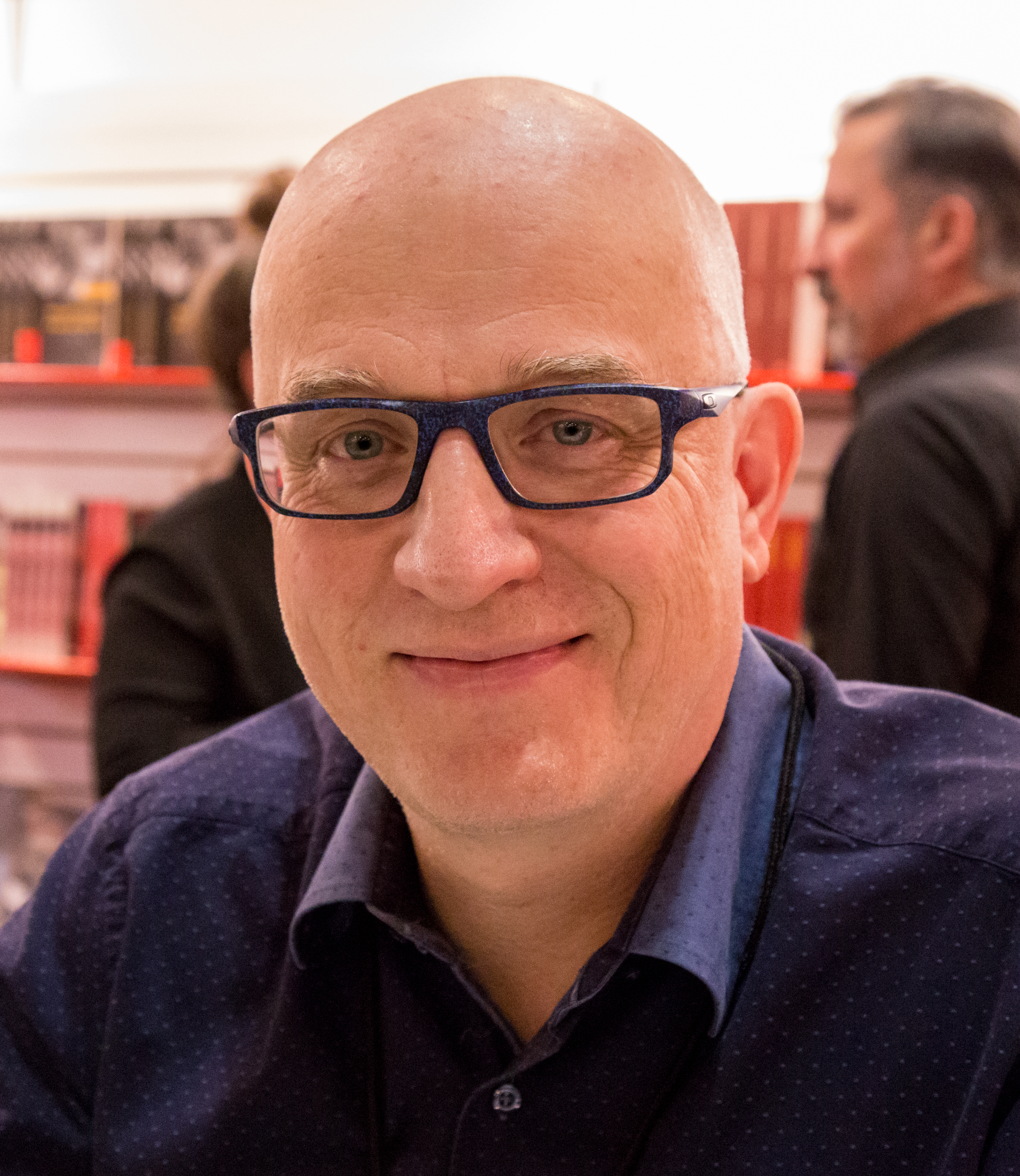
- Born: Montreal, Quebec, Canada
- Education: Doctor in Medicine
- Alma mater: Université de Montréal
- Scientific career
- Fields: Emergency medicine
- Institutions: Montreal Heart Institute
- Website: www.alainvadeboncoeur.com

Alain Vadeboncoeur is a Canadian emergency physician and science communicator living in Montreal. In addition to have built and lead the Montreal Heart Institute's emergency department from 1999 to 2021, he is active in the research community and is a frequent speaker in French-language media, dispelling myths about health issues, and very active in social media. He is also an author and a playwright. His social commitment to the public health system has made him more visible in Quebec news.

== Youth and academic training ==
Alain Vadeboncoeur is the son of the author Pierre Vadeboncoeur and Marie Gaboury, a Franco-Ontarian social worker. He grew up in Montreal's Outremont district.

Vadeboncoeur graduated from Cégep de Saint-Laurent in 1982 with a Diploma of College Studies in the natural sciences, then from the Université de Montréal in 1988 with a Doctor of Medicine. He completed his residency training in family medicine at the Université de Montréal and obtained his license to practice family medicine in 1990. He was recognized as a specialist in emergency medicine in 2000.

== Career in medicine ==
Vadeboncoeur was recruited by the Pierre-Boucher Hospital Center in Longueuil in 1990, where he became head of the department of emergency medicine. He was responsible for the coordination of medical services in Montérégie during the ice storm that hit Eastern Canada in 1998. In 1999, he became a member of the Department of Medicine of the Montreal Heart Institute, where he founded the Emergency Medicine Service in 2004, which he still runs.

Vadeboncoeur chaired the Quebec Association of Emergency Physicians from 1998 to 2000. He chaired the Table of Emergency Heads of Montreal, from 2001 to 2003. He was also President of the Association of Emergency Medicine Specialists of Quebec from 2004 to 2008. He has been a member of several working groups of health professionals, most recently of the Interdisciplinary Emergency Response Task Force in Montreal.

== Research and teaching ==
Vadeboncoeur quickly made his mark in the research community. He was a member of various research networks in emergency medicine during his career, he was Scientific Director of a conference on emergency medicine organized by Quebec's federation of general practitioners in 1997 and participated in the organization of several other conferences, in Canada and elsewhere. Together with other researchers, clinicians and administrators, in 2001 he founded the Inter-University Group for Emergency Research. In 2005, he co-chaired the first International Interdisciplinary Conference on Emergency Medicine, held in Montreal.

He continues his research work and is a member of the Canadian Institutes of Health Research Peer Review Committee. He is a reviewer for three scientific publications: the Canadian Journal of Cardiology (CJC), the Canadian Journal of Emergency Medicine (CJEM) and the Canadian Medical Association Journal (CMAJ).

Vadeboncoeur has been teaching at the Department of Family Medicine and Emergency Medicine at the Université de Montréal since 2003, including as an associate clinical professor since 2009. He is also one of the creators and the administrator of a course on the electrocardiogram.

== Science communicator ==
Vadeboncoeur has become an increasingly familiar presence in French-language Canadian media, both through his regular columns in several media and as a resource for journalists reporting on health issues. He has been commenting on health issues on his blog hosted by the website of the magazine L'Actualité since 2013. Since October 2017, he also produces a monthly column in the paper version of the magazine. He has also published texts on his blog on Rogers Group's Profession Santé Québec publication since 2009.

We must simplify things, we must talk to patients. Appearing in the media allowed me to improve the way I talk to patients and that is still a fundamental aspect of care.

— Alain Vadeboncoeur

His interventions often aim to correct perceptions concerning fraudulent treatments, or unfounded medical assertions. For example, he issued warnings about the so-called Zamboni treatment for multiple sclerosis, "detoxification" treatments and denounced news sites that contribute to spreading false news about health. Denouncing myths in health was also the theme of a series of lectures he offered with Olivier Bernard in 2015.

The term "detoxification" is a case of misuse of language, used as a very effective marketing strategy.

— Alain Vadeboncoeur

From 2010 to 2013, he hosted the television health information program Les docteurs on Radio-Canada. Vadeboncoeur has frequently acted as an expert medical consultant or collaborator for documentary series such as J'aurais donc dû, docteur and Clinique roulante, as well as for informational programs, including Une pilule, une petite granule and RDI-Santé and variety shows (L'après-midi porte conseil, Medium large).

Is it acceptable to say anything with the objective of selling, often at a high price, a little placebo effect? (...) There is also the risk that some patients will abandon effective treatments for fads of dubious efficacy.

— Alain Vadeboncoeur

== Social involvement ==
Vadeboncoeur has spoken repeatedly on the need to preserve a public health system, stressing in particular that a significant private component increases the costs of the system. He made this theme the subject of his 2012 book, Privé de soins, contre la régression tranquille en santé (Denied Care: Against a Quiet Regression in Health Care). Since its founding in 2008, Vadeboncoeur has been a member of the group Médecins québécois pour le régime public de santé and its chairman since 2012.

This kind of equality in the emergency room, led me to believe in the importance of maintaining a free and egalitarian system, even if it is imperfect - and I tried to improve these imperfections in the sectors I'm familiar with.

— Alain Vadeboncoeur

In 2016, Vadeboncoeur joined eight other Quebec personalities on a consultation tour on the future of Québec called Faut qu'on se parle. At the end of its tour, the collective summarized comments gathered in 163 assemblies and 19 open forums in the book Ne renonçons à rien (Let's not give anything up).

== Books ==
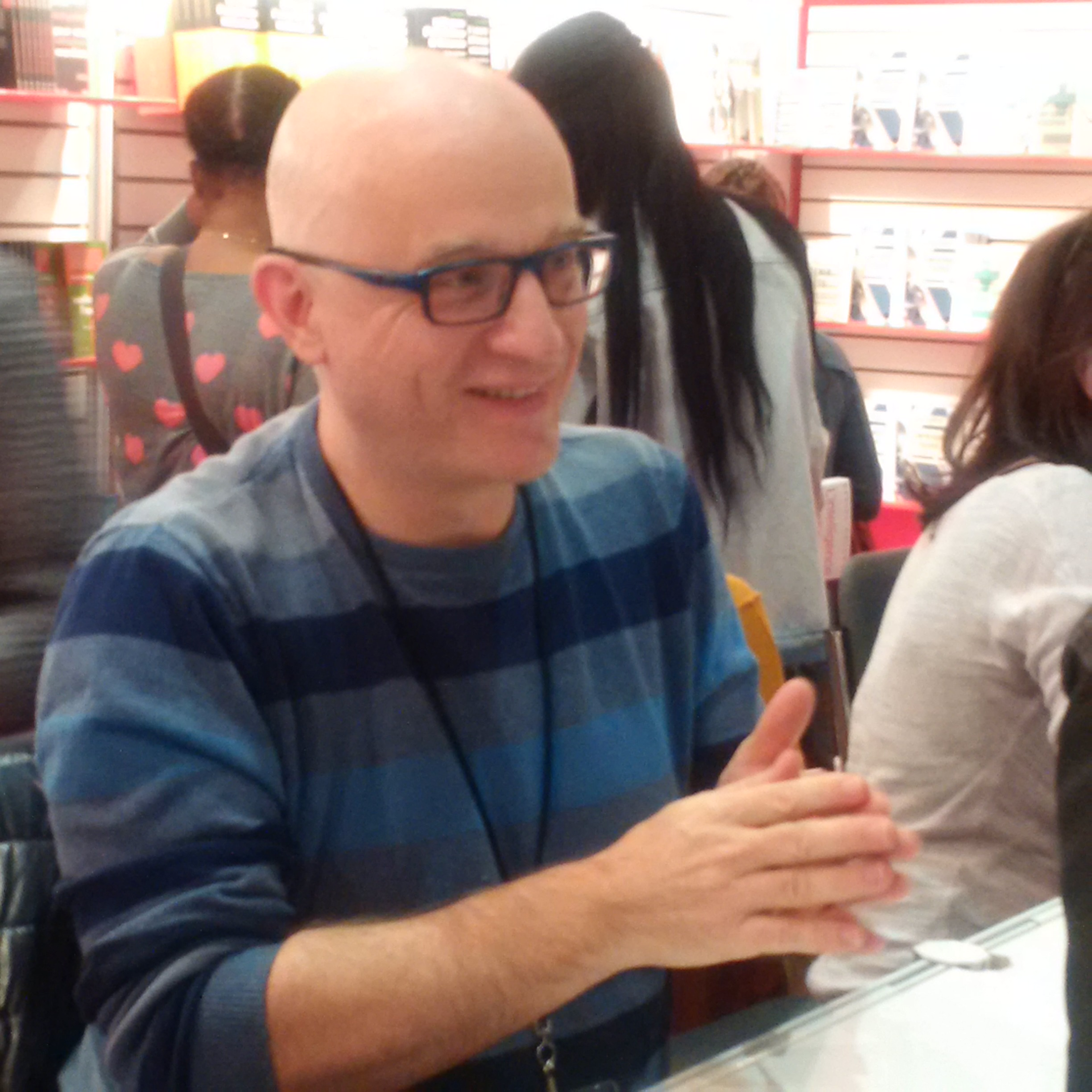
Alain Vadeboncoeur at the Salon du livre de Montréal.

Year	Title	Details
2009	Sacré coeur (Sacred Heart)	Theatre play.
2012	Privé de soins: Contre la régression tranquille en santé (Private Care: Against a Quiet Regression in Health Care)	Essay against the growing place of private interests in public health care.
2014	Les acteurs ne savent pas mourir: Récits d'un urgentologue (Actors don't know how to die: Tales from an emergency physician)	Observations on death.
2017	Ne renonçons à rien: Le livre de la tournée «Faut qu'on se parle» (Let's not give anything up: The book of the "We must talk" tour)	Essay following a public consultation. With eight other authors.
2017	Désordonnances: Conseils plus ou moins pratiques pour survivre en santé (Prescriptions: More or less useful tips to survive in health)	Essay on critical thinking and decision-making to stay healthy.
2018	Malade!: Récits à savourer en attendant le médecin (Prescriptions: Light emergency medicine stories from the author)	Collection of more or less light anecdotes within the framework of the emergency medicine department.

== Selected awards and honours ==
Year	Award or honour
2005	Agora award, Palais des congrès de Montréal.
2005	Certificate of merit in medical education, emergency physician category, Association des médecins de langue française du Canada.
2005	Finalist (for the Montreal Heart Institute): special mention, Quebec Public Administration Awards, category Health and Social Services.
2005	Finalist (for the Montreal Heart Institute): Honourable mention, 2005 Health and Safety Innovation Awards, Commission de la santé et de la sécurité du travail.
2008	First Place, National Association of EMS Physicians 2008 Annual Conference (jointly with six others).
2009	Rayonnement Award, Department of Family Medicine and Emergency Medicine, Faculty of Medicine, Université de Montréal.
2010	Professor in Whose Hands We Would Put our Life Award, Medicine student association, Université de Montréal.
2012	Honorary president, 12th annual conference of the Quebec Vascular Society.
2018	Hubert Reeves Award (public communication), Association des communicateurs scientifiques du Québec.

== Personal life ==
Alain Vadeboncoeur grew up surrounded by his four older brothers and sisters, as well as his parents. Shortly after Alain's birth, his father, the author Pierre Vadeboncoeur, transitioned from his work as a union organizer to a position at the headquarters of the Confederation of national unions. His mother worked in hospitals in the Montreal area, as a social worker. Her father was a family physician in the community of Plantagenet, Ontario.

The family was in contact with several characters who have made their mark in the history of Quebec. His godfather Michel Chartrand, the poet Gaston Miron and the publisher Pierre Péladeau were frequent visitors, as well as their next-door neighbor, the journalist Louis Martin. A young anti-smoking activist, he managed to convince his father to give up tobacco, but his attempts to separate René Lévesque from his cigarettes failed.

The Vadeboncoeur family has spent part of the summer at a cottage at Lac Nominingue in the Laurentians, since Alain was four years old. He still vacations there today.

Pierre Vadeboncoeur was a hypochondriac and did not initially encourage his son to pursue a career in medicine. For the most part, his brothers and sisters chose to work in the arts. Hesitating between mathematics and medicine, Alain picked med school at the last minute. Discouraged by the teaching style at the Faculty of Medicine at the Université de Montreal, Alain interrupted his studies to travel, came back to complete the program and discovered a passion for hospital work.

With his childhood friend Alexis Martin, Vadeboncoeur co-wrote and participated in the staging of the play Sacré Coeur (Sacred Heart), presented in 2008 by Espace libre in Montreal. The events of the play take place in the emergency room of a hospital.

Vadeboncoeur plays the piano.
