= Olivier Bernard (pharmacist) =

Canadian science educator and pharmacist (born 1982)

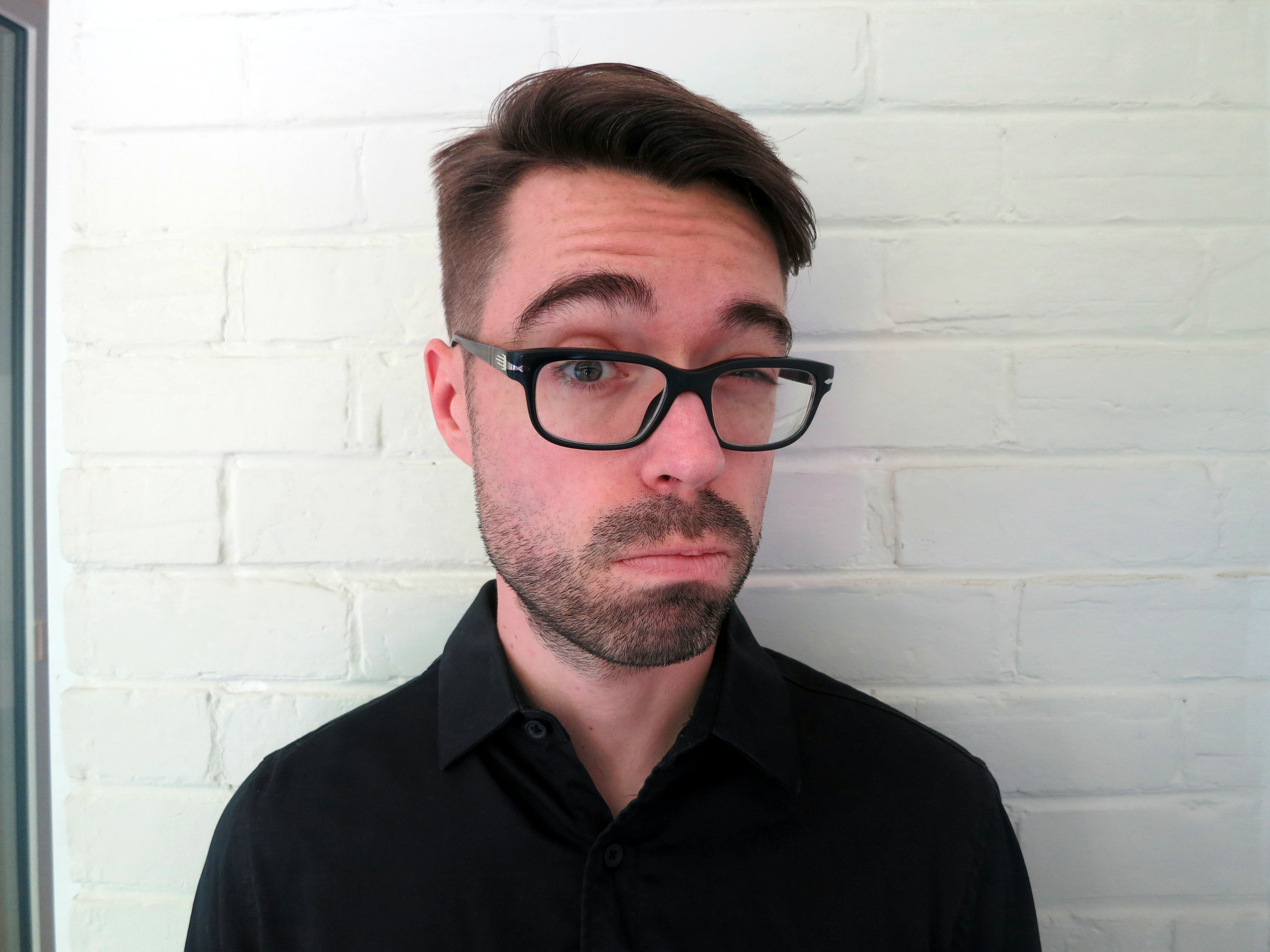
- Olivier Bernard, The Pharmafist
- Born: 1982 (age 43–44); Quebec City, Quebec, Canada
- Education: B.Pharm., M.Sc. Pharmacogenetics
- Alma mater: Université Laval, Quebec City
- Known for: The Pharmafist
- Partner: India Desjardins
- Awards: Michener award 2025; Prix Innovation 2015; Prix Sceptique 2014
- Scientific career
- Fields: Pharmacy, Pharmacology
- Website: https://lepharmachien.com/category/english/

Olivier Bernard, known as the Pharmafist (Le Pharmachien), is a Canadian science communicator who uses cartoons to counter pseudo-scientific myths. He writes the Pharmafist blog, the Pharmachien books and produces the television program Les aventures du pharmachien, denouncing ineffective or dangerous treatments.

== Early life, family and education ==
Bernard earned his Bachelor of Pharmacy in 2004 from Université Laval in Quebec City. He subsequently completed, in 2006, a master's degree in pharmacogenetics and worked for some time in the pharmaceutical industry.

== Career ==
Bernard started working as a pharmacist after receiving his bachelor's degree in 2004. However, disillusioned by the industry's business practices, Bernard quit working as a pharmacist full-time in 2013.

There was a constant conflict between the commercial side and pharmaceutics.

He still works as a part-time pharmacist but focuses working as a scientific communicator. He writes books, produces a television program and gives conferences.

He comments on medicine and pseudoscience on lepharmachien.com (in French) since 2012 and in English on thepharmafist.com, since 2016. Bernard uses a colourful style, described by emergency physician Alain Vadeboncoeur as "friendly, but confident, perhaps a little of a smart-ass", but "he does not attack people, only practices, ideas and concepts." As a science communicator, Bernard says he's influenced by Vadeboncoeur, as well as astrophysicists Hubert Reeves and Neil deGrasse Tyson.

== Web activity ==
Through his website, the Pharmafist aims to "destroy scientific myths and health beliefs and (...) encourages people to develop critical thinking and to make better choices about vaccines, gluten, nutritional complements, sugar or useless cold medicines."

In March 2019, Bernard was targeted by an intimidation and doxing campaign from groups supporting the use of vitamin C injections as a treatment for cancer, after demonstrating this practice promoted by alternative medicine practitioners is not supported by scientific evidence. He publicly denounced the degree of hostility unleashed on him and his spouse.

In 2017, his French Facebook page had 144,000 subscribers. The lepharmachien.com website logged 350,000 visits per month.

"One question I often ask myself is: Just how much must I make the content accessible? (...) Reaching a good balance between a short, punchy text and rigorous content is always a challenge." - Olivier Bernard, the Pharmafist

== Books ==
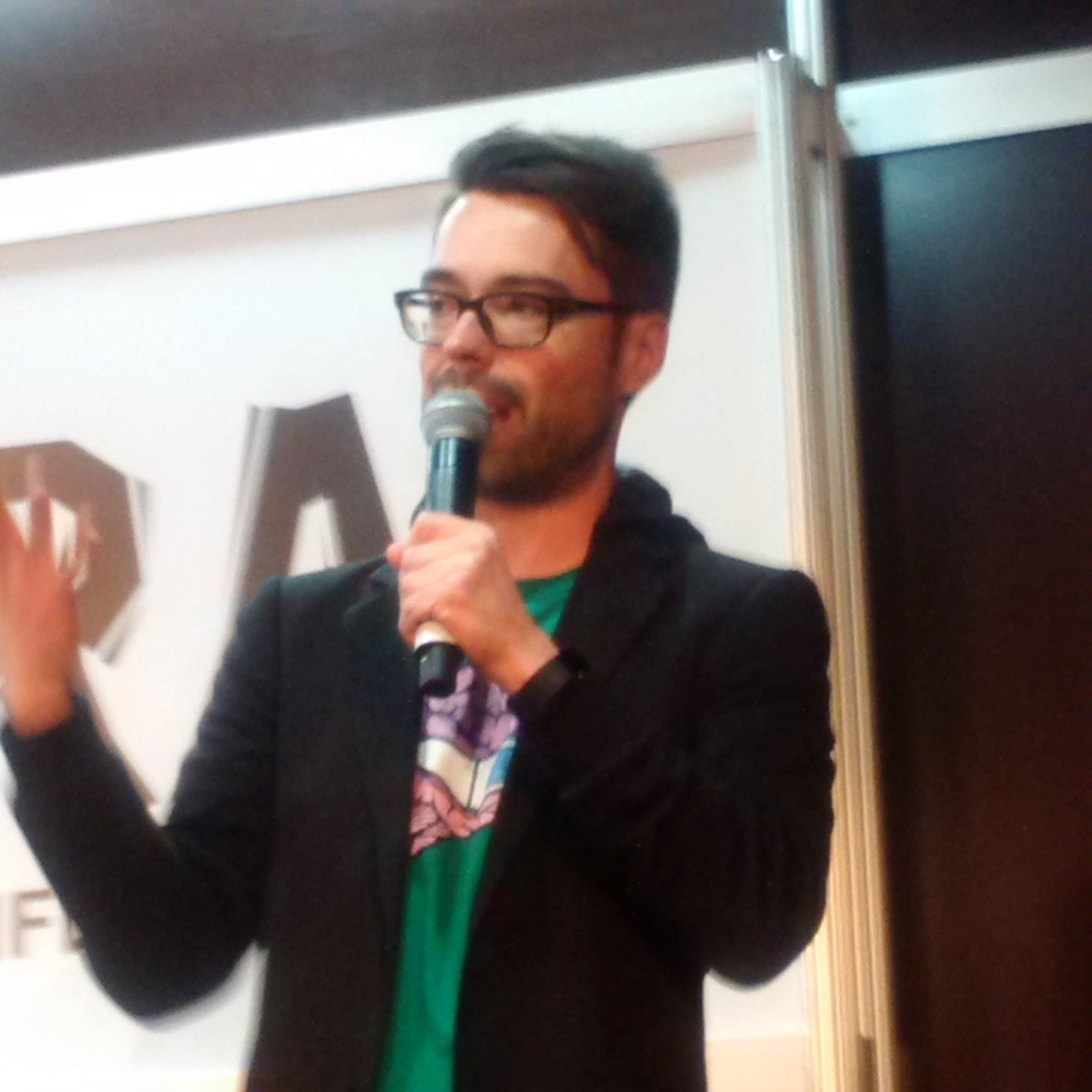
Olivier Bernard at the 2017 Salon du livre de Montréal.

Caption
Year	Title
2014	Le Pharmachien : Différencier le vrai du n'importe quoi en santé ! (The Pharmafist: How to tell between truth and made-up stuff in health care)
2015	Le Pharmachien 2 : Guide de survie pour petits et grands bobos (The Pharmafist 2: Survival guide for little and big booboos)
2017	Le Pharmachien tome 3: La bible des arguments qui n'ont pas d'allure (The Pharmafist 3: The Bible of nonsensical arguments)
2018	Le petit garçon qui posait trop de questions (The boy who asked too many questions)

== Television series ==
Three seasons of the documentary series Les aventures du Pharmachien (The Adventures of Pharmafist) have been aired by ICI Explora. They feature Olivier Bernard in his role as the Pharmafist, offering a scientific viewpoint on health care, through experiments, interviews, cartoons and humour. Bernard is identified as host and content producer of the program for DATSIT Studios.

In the program, Bernard experiments on himself with many treatments he denounces as being ineffective: natural sunscreen, homeopathic solutions, products meant to change the acidity of one's urine.

The initial broadcast of the first episode was seen by a total of 363,000 people on Radio-Canada's various platforms. A second broadcast two days later attracted 43,000 more.

Episodes season 1	Episodes season 2	Episodes season 3
Started December 2, 2016	Started December 1, 2017	Started December 14, 2018
La détox du foie (liver detox)	Le cannabis médical (medicinal cannabis)	L'ostéopathie (osteopathy)
L'alimentation bio (organic food)	Les OGM (GMOs)	La diète cétogène (keto diet)
L'effet placebo (placebo effect)	Le TDAH (ADHD)	L'autisme (autism)
La diète alcaline (alcaline diet)	Les suppléments alimentaires pour sportifs (sports supplements)	L'alimentation végétalienne (vegetarianism)
Les régimes (diets)	La pilule contraceptive (birth control pill)	L'accouchement (births)
La crème solaire (sunscreen)	Les thérapies énergétiques (energy therapies)	La maladie de Lyme (Lyme disease)
Les jus (juices)	Le lait (milk)	Les métaux lourds (heavy metals)
Les produits naturels (natural products)	Les traitements contre le cancer (cancer treatments)	Les vitamines (vitamins)
L'hypnose (hypnosis)	Le jeûne (fasting)	Les antibiotiques (antibiotics)
Le gluten (gluten)	L'intestin et le microbiote (intestines and microbiotics)	Tests médicaux et dépistage (screening medical tests)
Les superaliments (super foods)	L'allaitement (nursing newborns)	Maladies causées par les émotions (diseases caused by emotions)
Les ondes électromagnétiques (electromagnetic waves)	L'alcool (alcohol)	Allergies et intolérances alimentaires (allergies and dietary intolerance)
Le système immunitaire (immune system)	Les produits cosmétiques (beauty products)	Les eaux (water)
L'homéopathie (homeopathy)		
Les vaccins (vaccines)		

== Podcast series ==
As the first season of his podcast Dérives , Bernard released in 2020 an eight-episodes podcast on the 2011 death of Chantal Lavigne, during a New Age sudation workshop. Produced with Radio-Canada, the podcast includes interviews with several people connected to the events leading to the tragedy. Bernard indicated Lavigne's death is one of the reasons started doing science communication.

The second season of the podcast, aired in 2021, examines the events leading to the death of Nelson Deschênes following his participation in Ayahuasca rituals.

Taking the death of Bernard Lachance as a starting point, the third season (2024) relates the role Guylaine Lanctôt played in the spread of medical disinformation in Quebec and Canada, mainly in the 1990s.

The fourth season makes a deep dive into chronic Lyme disease. The podcast was awarded the Michener Award for 2025, which Bernard accepted for Radio-Canada.

== Distinctions ==
2025: Michener Award

2024: Meritorious Service Medal (Civil Division), Governor General of Canada

2019: John Maddox Prize (early career award) for defending science (award from Nature and Sense about Science)

2018: Prix Coup de Coeur, ASPQ (award from Quebec's Public Health Association).

2015: Prix Innovation, Ordre des pharmaciens du Québec (Innovation Award from the Order of Pharmacists of Quebec).

2014: Prix Sceptique, Les sceptiques du Québec (award from Quebec's Skeptics Association).

== Personal life ==
Bernard is from Beauport, which is now a borough of Quebec City. He has been living in Montreal since 2006. He is in a relationship with author India Desjardins. In Winter 2017, Bernard shared with university magazine Contact that starting a family is not out of the question.

I was always a skeptic. (...) I was constantly challenging my parents and my teachers, as early as elementary school. - Olivier Bernard, The Pharmafist

Passionate about the outdoors, Bernard gets his energy from expeditions in nature.
