= 2025 Quebec Liberal Party leadership election =

Provincial party election in Canada

- June 9–14, 2025
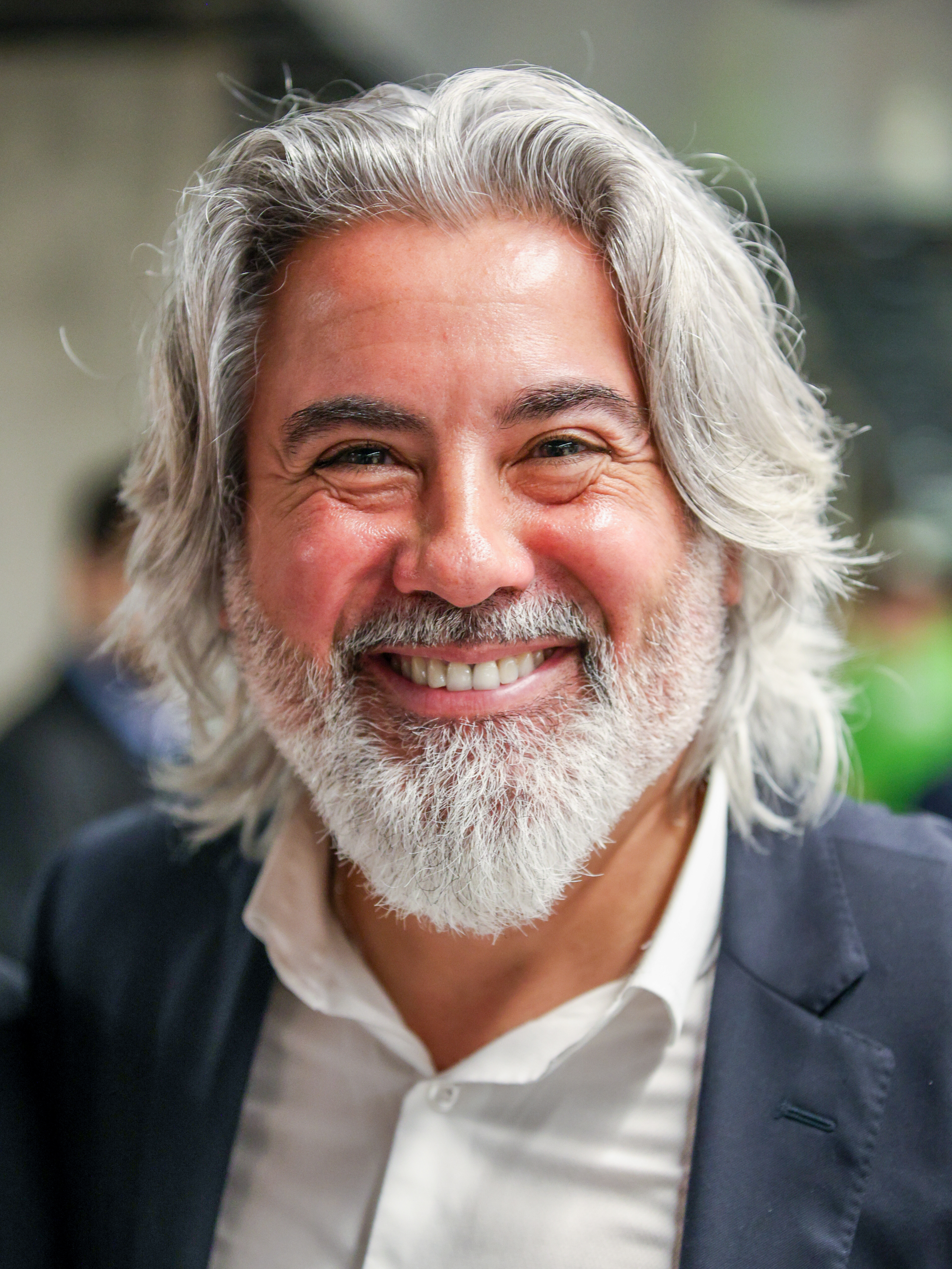

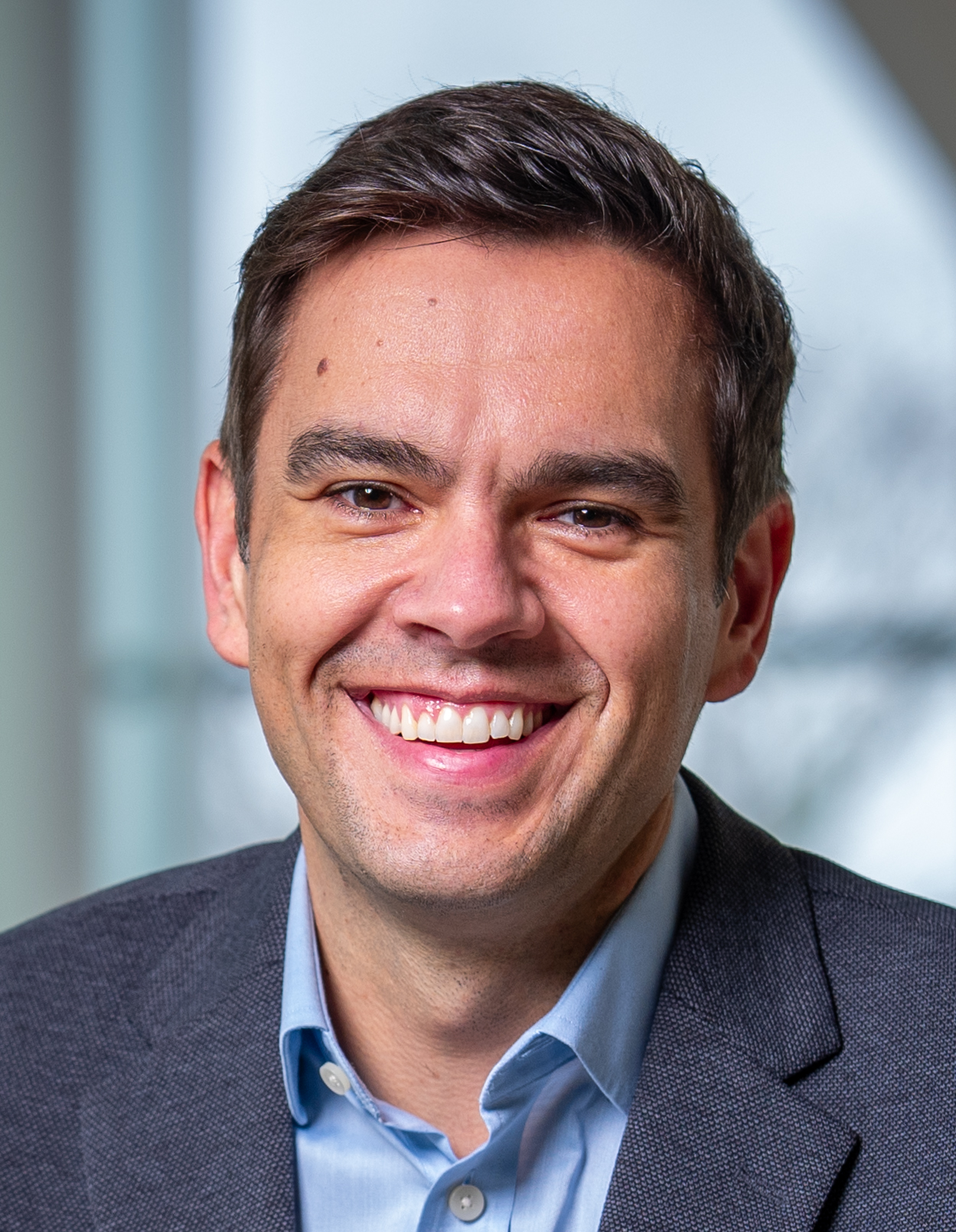
			KB
Candidate	Pablo Rodriguez	Charles Milliard	Karl Blackburn
Runoff	195,602 (52.3%)	178,398 (47.7%)	Eliminated
First ballot	145,878 (39%)	107,345 (28.7%)	103,265 (27.6%)
Leader before election
Marc Tanguay (interim)
Leader after election
Pablo Rodriguez

2025 Quebec Liberal Party leadership election
- Date: June 9–14, 2025
- Convention: Quebec City
- Resigning leader: Dominique Anglade
- Won by: Pablo Rodriguez
- Ballots: 2
- Candidates: 5
- Entrance fee: $40,000
- Spending limit: $400,000

The 2025 Quebec Liberal Party leadership election was held from June 9 to 14, 2025, to elect a new leader to replace former Quebec Liberal Party leader Dominique Anglade, who announced her resignation on November 7, 2022, amid mounting criticism within the party for her performance in the 2022 Quebec general election and for her subsequent decision to remove Liberal MNA Marie-Claude Nichols from caucus. Anglade had led the party to losses in the election held a month earlier, finishing with only 21 seats and 14% of the popular vote, their lowest seat count since 1956 and their lowest share of the popular vote in their history; while the party remained the official opposition, they fell behind the governing Coalition Avenir Québec and opposition Québec solidaire and Parti Québécois to place fourth in the popular vote.

Former federal cabinet minister Pablo Rodriguez was elected on the second ballot against former Quebec chamber of commerce president Charles Milliard by less than 5 percentage points.

Rodriguez became the first Hispanic to lead a provincial party in Quebec. Rodriguez also was the first former federal cabinet minister to be elected to lead the Quebec Liberal Party since Jean Charest in 1998 and the first one from the federal Liberal Party since Jean Lesage in 1960

== Rules and procedures ==
The race officially started on January 13, 2025. The candidate registration period runs from January 13 to April 11, 2025. To be registered in the race, candidates need to collect signatures from 750 party members from at least 70 electoral districts and 12 administrative regions with 350 of them needing to be new members who joined after May 27, 2024. Candidates also need to deposit an $40,000 entry fee to be registered. The spending limit will be $400,000. Candidates must also be approved by the party's Electoral Committee; if they are rejected they may appeal to the Arbitration Committee within 5 days. Votes are weighed by riding and age, meaning there's pressure for candidates to appeal to Quebec's different regions and young people in the points-based electoral system.

The voting period will be between June 9 and 14, 2025, with anyone who was a member of the party on May 20 being able to vote. Points will be allocated to candidates with the one receiving over 50% of the total amount of points becoming leader of the party. If no candidate reaches this threshold, a second round will be organized between the two candidates who received the most points from the first round. Each electoral district will have 2,000 points to be distributed according to the vote of members 26 years old and older in that district, for a total of 250,000 points. 125,000 points will be allocated according to the vote of members 25 years old and younger across the province. The new leader will be announced on June 14, 2025, during a convention in Quebec City.

The requirements to enter the race, the spending limit and timeframes for the start of the race and the election, set in late 2024 and in the spring of 2025, respectively, were announced in October 2023. The precise dates of the start of the race and the voting period and other parts of the procedure were announced in April 2024.

== Debates ==
In April 2024, the party announced that, if more than one candidate is running for election, five debates will be organized between April 12 and June 8, 2025.

== Candidates ==
=== Official ===
Candidate	Experience	Announcement date	Campaign	Ref.
Marc Bélanger	Tax lawyer Candidate for the Liberal Party of Canada in Matapédia—Matane in 2000 and 2004	August 28, 2024	Endorsements; Website	
Karl Blackburn	President of the Conseil du patronat du Québec (2020–2025); Director General of the Quebec Liberal Party (2009–2013); MNA for Roberval (2003–2007)	March 31, 2025	Endorsements; Website	
Charles Milliard	President of the Quebec Federation of Chambers of Commerce (2020–2024)	August 9, 2024	Endorsements; Website	
Pablo Rodriguez	Federal Minister of Transport (2023–2024); Quebec lieutenant for the Liberal Party of Canada (2019–2024); Minister of Canadian Heritage (Note: Minister of Canadian Heritage and Multiculturalism from 2018 to 2019) (2018–2019; 2021–2023); MP for Honoré-Mercier (2004–2011; 2015–2025)	September 19, 2024	Endorsements; Website	
Mario Roy	Farmer; Economist	January 16, 2025		

=== Disqualified ===
Candidate	Experience	Dates	Campaign	Ref.
Denis Coderre	Mayor of Montreal (2013–2017); Federal President of the Privy Council (2003–2004); Federal Minister of Citizenship and Immigration (2002–2003); MP for Bourassa (1997–2013)	Declared: June 21, 2024; Disqualified: February 7, 2025	Endorsements	

=== Withdrawn ===
Candidate	Experience	Announcement date	Withdrawal date	Campaign	Ref.
Frédéric Beauchemin	MNA for Marguerite-Bourgeoys (2022–present)	September 13, 2024	January 13, 2025	Endorsements; Website	

=== Declined ===
- Gaétan Barrette, Minister of Health and Social Services (2014–2018), MNA for La Pinière (2014–2022).
- Sophie Brochu, President and CEO of Hydro-Québec (2020–2023).
- Madwa-Nika Cadet, co-president of the Committee on the Revival of the QLP (2023), MNA for Bourassa-Sauvé (2022–present).
- François-Philippe Champagne, federal Minister of Innovation, Science and Industry (2021–2025), Minister of Foreign Affairs (2019–2021), Minister of Infrastructure and Communities (2018–2019), Minister of International Trade (2017–2018), MP for Saint-Maurice—Champlain (2015–present).
- Guy Cormier, President and CEO of Desjardins Group (2016–present).
- Alexandre Cusson, Candidate in the 2020 Quebec Liberal Party leadership election, Mayor of Drummondville (2013–2020), President of the Union des Municipalités du Québec (2017–2019).
- Monsef Derraji, MNA for Nelligan (2018–present).
- Antoine Dionne Charest, Member of the Committee on the Revival of the QLP (2023), Son of former premier Jean Charest.
- Mario Dumont, Leader of the Action Démocratique du Québec (1994–2009), Leader of the Official Opposition (2007–2008), MNA for Rivière-du-Loup (1994–2009).
- André Fortin, Minister of Transport, Sustainable Mobility and Transport Electrification (2017–2018), MNA for Pontiac (2014–present).
- Jean-Marc Fournier, Interim Leader of the Quebec Liberal Party (2012–2013), Leader of the Official Opposition (2012–2013), Minister of Justice (2010–2012), Leader of the government in parliament (2007–2008; 2010–2012; 2014–2018), Minister of Revenue (2007–2008), Minister of Education, Leisure and Sports (2005–2007), Minister of Municipal Affairs, Sports and Leisure (2003–2005), MNA for Châteauguay (1994–2008), MNA for Saint-Laurent (2010–2018).
- Sam Hamad, President of the Treasury Board (2016), Minister of Labour, Employment and Social Solidarity (2015–2016), Minister of Labour (2014–2015), Minister of Economic Development, Innovation and Export Trade (2011–2012), Minister of Transport (2010–2011), Minister of Labour (2009–2010), Minister of Employment and Social Solidarity (2007–2010), Minister of Natural Resources, Wildlife and Parks (2003–2005), MNA for Louis-Hébert (2003–2017).
- Balarama Holness, Candidate in Notre-Dame-de-Grâce in 2022, Leader of Bloc Montreal (2022–present), Candidate for Mayor of Montreal in 2021, Leader of Mouvement Montréal (2021–present), Former canadian football player.
- Joël Lightbound, MP for Louis-Hébert (2015–present).
- Bruno Marchand, Mayor of Quebec City (2021–present).
- Pierre Moreau, Minister of Energy and Natural Resources (2017–2018), President of the Treasury Board (2017), Minister of Education, Recreation and Sports (2016), Minister of Municipal Affairs and Land Occupancy (2014–2016), Candidate in the 2013 Quebec Liberal Party leadership election, Minister of Transport (2011–2012), Minister responsible for Canadian Intergovernmental Affairs and the Canadian Francophonie (2011), MNA for Marguerite-D'Youville (2003–2007) and Châteauguay (2008–2018).
- André Pratte, co-president of the Committee on the Revival of the QLP (2023), Federal Senator for De Salaberry (2016–2019).
- Alain Rayes, Quebec lieutenant for the Conservative Party of Canada (2017–2020; 2021–2022), MP for Richmond—Arthabaska (2015–2025), Mayor of Victoriaville (2009–2015).
- Marwah Rizqy, MNA for Saint-Laurent (2018–present).
- Marc Tanguay, Interim Leader of the Quebec Liberal Party (2022–2025), Leader of the Official Opposition (2022–2025), MNA for LaFontaine (2012–present).
- Antoine Tardif, Mayor of Victoriaville (2021–present), Mayor of Daveluyville (2013–2016), Former ice hockey goaltender.

== Endorsements ==
=== Marc Bélanger ===
Marc Bélanger

Former MNAs

- Jean Rioux, MNA for Iberville (2003–2007), MP for St-Jean (2015-2019), Parliamentary Secretary to the Minister of National Defence (2017-2018)

=== Karl Blackburn ===
Karl Blackburn

Former ministers

- Yvon Marcoux, Minister of Transport (2003–2005), Minister of Justice (2005–2007), MNA for Vaudreuil (1998–2014)
- Michel Audet, Minister of Finance (2005–2007), MNA for Laporte (2003–2007)
- David Whissell, Minister of Labour (2007–2009) MNA for Argenteuil (1998–2011)

Former MNAs

- Johanne Gonthier, MNA for Mégantic-Compton (2007–2012)
- Madeleine Bélanger, MNA for Mégantic-Compton (1983–2003)
- Karine Vallières, MNA for Richmond (2012–2018)
- Robert Benoît, MNA for Orford (1989–2003)
- Claude Dauphin, MNA for Marquette (1981–1994), Borough mayor of Lachine (2005–2017)
- Raymond Bernier, MNA for Montmorency (2003–2007, 2008–2012, 2014–2018)
- Francois Desrochers, MNA for Mirabel (2007–2008)
- Georges Farrah, MNA for Îles-de-la-Madeleine (1985–1998), MP for Bonaventure—Gaspé—Îles-de-la-Madeleine—Pabok (2000–2004)

Former MPs

- Marlene Jennings, MP for Notre-Dame-de-Grâce—Lachine (1997–2011)
- Sylvie Boucher, MP for Beauport—Limoilou (2006–2011) and Beauport—Côte-de-Beaupré—Île d'Orléans—Charlevoix (2015–2019)

=== Charles Milliard ===
Charles Millard

Former ministers

- Raymond Bachand, Candidate in the 2013 Quebec Liberal Party leadership election, Minister of Revenue (2010–2012), Minister of Finance (2009–2012), Minister of Tourism (2007–2008), Minister of Economic Development, Innovation and Export Trade (2006–2009), MNA for Outremont (2005–2013).
- Lucie Charlebois, Minister for Rehabilitation, Youth Protection and Public Health (2014–2018), Chief Government Whip (2011–2012), MNA for Soulanges (2003–2018). (campaign co-chair)
- Jean D'Amour, Minister of Maritime Affairs (2016–2018), Minister of Transports and Implementation of the Maritime Strategy (2014–2016), MNA for Rivière-du-Loup (2009–2012) then Rivière-du-Loup–Témiscouata (2012–2018), President of the Quebec Liberal Party (2008–2009), Mayor of Rivière-du-Loup (1999–2007). (campaign co-chair)
- André Fortin, Minister of Transport, Sustainable Mobility and Transport Electrification (2017–2018), MNA for Pontiac (2014–present). (campaign funding chair)
- Clifford Lincoln, Minister of the Environment (1985–1988), MNA for Nelligan (1981–1989), MP for Lachine—Lac-Saint-Louis (1993–1997) then Lac-Saint-Louis (1997–2004).
- Serge Simard, delegate Minister for Natural Resources (2008-12), MNA for Dubuc (2008-12, 2014-18)
- David Whissell, Minister of Labour (2007–2009), MNA for Argenteuil (1998–2011).

MNAs

- Madwa-Nika Cadet, MNA for Bourassa-Sauvé (2022–present). (campaign co-chair)
- Virginie Dufour, MNA for Mille-Îles (2022–present), Laval city councillor for Sainte-Rose (2013–2021).
- Jennifer Maccarone, MNA for Westmount–Saint-Louis (2018–present).
- André A. Morin, MNA for Acadie (2022–present).

Former MNA

- Jean Rousselle, MNA for Vimont (2012–2022).

=== Pablo Rodriguez ===
Pablo Rodriguez

Former ministers

- Martin Coiteux, Minister of Municipal Affairs and Land Occupancy (2016–2018), Minister of Public Security (2016–2018), President of the Treasury Board (2014–2016), MNA for Nelligan (2014–2018).
- Sam Elkas, Minister of Transport (1989–1994), Minister of Public Security (1989–1990), MNA for Robert-Baldwin (1989–1994).
- Luc Fortin, Candidate for mayor of Sherbrooke in 2021, Minister of Families (2017–2018), Minister of Culture and Communications (2016–2017), MNA for Sherbrooke (2014–2018). (campaign co-chair)
- Robert Poëti, Minister of Transport (2014–2016), MNA for Marguerite-Bourgeoys (2012–2018).

MNAs

- Frédéric Beauchemin, MNA for Marguerite-Bourgeoys (2022–present). (previous leadership candidate)
- Linda Caron, MNA for La Pinière (2022–present).
- Brigitte Garceau, MNA for Robert-Baldwin (2022–present).
- Greg Kelley, MNA for Jacques-Cartier (2018-present)
- Sona Lakhoyan Olivier, MNA for Chomedey (2022–present). (previously endorsed Beauchemin)
- Désirée McGraw, MNA for Notre-Dame-de-Grâce (2022–present).
- Elisabeth Prass, MNA for D'Arcy-McGee (2022–present).
- Marwah Rizqy, MNA for Saint-Laurent (2018-present)
- Michelle Setlakwe, MNA for Mont-Royal–Outremont (2022–present). (campaign co-chair)
- Marie-Claude Nichols, MNA for Vaudreuil (2014-present)

Former MNAs

- Guy Hardy, MNA for Saint-François (2014–2018).
- Albert Khelfa, MNA for Richelieu (1985–1994).
- Camille Picard, MNA for Johnson (1980–1981).
- Caroline Simard, MNA for Charlevoix–Côte-de-Beaupré (2014–2018).
- Alexandre Iracà, MNA for Papineau (2012–2018).
- Claude Trudel, MNA for Bourget (1985–1989).

Former MP

- Rémi Bujold, Former chief of staff to Robert Bourassa, MP for Bonaventure—Îles-de-la-Madeleine (1979–1984), minister of state in the Ministry of John Turner (1984).

=== Declined to endorse ===
Declined to endorse

Party leader

- Marc Tanguay, Interim Leader of the Quebec Liberal Party (2022–present), Leader of the Official Opposition (2022–present), MNA for LaFontaine (2012–present).

MNAs

- Frantz Benjamin, MNA for Viau (2018–present), Montreal city councillor for Saint-Michel (2009–2018).
- Enrico Ciccone, MNA for Marquette (2018–present).
- Monsef Derraji, MNA for Nelligan (2018–present).
- Filomena Rotiroti, MNA for Jeanne-Mance–Viger (2008–present).

Organization

- Quebec Liberal Party Youth Commission

== Opinion polling ==
=== Leadership election ===
==== Liberal supporters ====
Polling firm	Last date of polling	Sample size	Source	MoE	Frédéric Beauchemin	Marc Bélanger	Denis Coderre	Antoine Dionne Charest	Joël Lightbound	Charles Milliard	Marwah Rizqy	Pablo Rodriguez	Marc Tanguay	Other
Léger Marketing	February 2, 2025	126	PDF	–	-	9%	11%	–	–	6%	–	27%	–	Undecided/refused to answer 47%
Léger Marketing	November 11, 2024	107	PDF	–	1%	4%	13%	–	–	4%	–	28%	–	Undecided/refused to answer 49%
Léger Marketing	October 6, 2024	125	PDF	–	1%	6%	14%	–	–	5%	–	30%	–	Undecided/refused to answer 45%
Léger Marketing	August 25, 2024	108	PDF	–	1%	–	16%	4%	–	7%	2%	13%	11%	François-Philippe Champagne 6% Antoine Tardif 3% Undecided/refused to answer 37%
Léger Marketing	June 3, 2024	104	PDF	–	2%	–	12%	4%	–	1%	6%	–	30%	Karl Blackburn 5% Antoine Tardif 5% Undecided/refused to answer 36%
Léger Marketing	February 5, 2024	107	PDF	–	3%	–	27%	11%	–	–	10%	–	12%	Balarama Holness 3% Undecided/refused to answer 33%
Léger Marketing	August 21, 2023	93	PDF	–	1%	–	–	–	2%	–	7%	–	28%	Balarama Holness 6% Alain Rayes 4% Monsef Derraji 1% Alexandre Cusson 0% Undecided/refused to answer 51%
Léger Marketing	June 12, 2023	112	PDF	–	2%	–	–	–	1%	–	6%	–	27%	André Fortin 5% Sophie Brochu 2% André Pratte 1% Monsef Derraji 0% Undecided/refused to answer 55%
Léger Marketing	November 6, 2022	103	PDF	–	–	–	17%	–	0%	–	3%	–	1%	Gaétan Barrette 4% Sophie Brochu 4% Pierre Moreau 4% Pierre Arcand 2% François-Philippe Champagne 1% Alexandre Cusson 1% André Fortin 0% Undecided/refused to answer 62%

==== All Quebecers ====
Polling firm	Last date of polling	Sample size	Source	MoE	Frédéric Beauchemin	Marc Bélanger	Denis Coderre	Antoine Dionne Charest	Joël Lightbound	Charles Milliard	Marwah Rizqy	Pablo Rodriguez	Marc Tanguay	Other
Léger Marketing	February 2, 2025	1,017	PDF	±3.07%	-	6%	10%	–	–	6%	–	19%	–	Undecided/refused to answer 60%
Léger Marketing	November 11, 2024	1,010	PDF	±3.08%	2%	3%	11%	–	–	3%	–	25%	–	Undecided/refused to answer 56%
Léger Marketing	October 6, 2024	1,036	PDF	±3.04%	3%	3%	11%	–	–	4%	–	24%	–	Undecided/refused to answer 55%
Léger Marketing	August 25, 2024	1,041	PDF	±3.04%	1%	–	10%	2%	–	3%	7%	8%	4%	François-Philippe Champagne 7% Antoine Tardif 2% Undecided/refused to answer 57%
Léger Marketing	June 3, 2024	1,015	PDF	±3.08%	2%	–	13%	2%	–	2%	10%	–	7%	Antoine Tardif 3% Karl Blackburn 1% Undecided/refused to answer 62%
Léger Marketing	February 5, 2024	1,032	PDF	±3.05%	3%	–	18%	4%	–	–	15%	–	4%	Balarama Holness 2% Undecided/refused to answer 55%
Léger Marketing	August 21, 2023	1,036	PDF	±3.04%	2%	–	–	–	3%	–	11%	–	6%	Alain Rayes 4% Balarama Holness 3% Alexandre Cusson 1% Monsef Derraji 1% Undecided/refused to answer 70%
Léger Marketing	June 12, 2023	1,042	PDF	±3.03%	1%	–	–	–	3%	–	11%	–	6%	Sophie Brochu 7% André Fortin 3% Monsef Derraji 1% André Pratte 1% Undecided/refused to answer 68%
Léger Marketing	November 6, 2022	1,028	PDF	±3.1%	–	–	9%	–	2%	–	5%	–	1%	Pierre Moreau 5% Pierre Arcand 4% Sophie Brochu 4% Gaétan Barrette 2% François-Philippe Champagne 2% André Fortin 2% Alexandre Cusson 0% Undecided/refused to answer 65%

=== General election ===
==== Karl Blackburn as leader ====
Polling organisation	Last date of polling	Source	Sample size	MoE	CAQ	QS	PQ	PLQ	PCQ	Other	Lead
Leger	May 13, 2025	PDF	706		20	10	32	25	11	3	7
Leger	November 11, 2024	PDF	1,010	±3.08%	17	12	36	20	12	3	16
Leger	October 6, 2024	PDF	1,036	±3.04%	27	12	27	21	10	2	0
Leger	August 25, 2024	PDF	1,041	±3.04%	23	14	30	16	12	4	7
Leger	February 5, 2024	PDF	1,032	±3.05%	23	14	31	21	9	3	8

==== Charles Milliard as leader ====
Polling organisation	Last date of polling	Source	Sample size	MoE	CAQ	QS	PQ	PLQ	PCQ	Other	Lead
Leger	May 13, 2025	PDF	691		19	11	32	22	12	4	10
Leger	November 11, 2024	PDF	1,010	±3.08%	20	13	36	16	13	2	16
Leger	August 25, 2024	PDF	1,041	±3.04%	23	15	31	14	13	4	8

==== Pablo Rodriguez as leader ====
Polling organisation	Last date of polling	Source	Sample size	MoE	CAQ	QS	PQ	PLQ	PCQ	Other	Lead
Leger	May 13, 2025	PDF	733		16	8	30	31	11	3	1
Leger	November 11, 2024	PDF	1,010	±3.08%	15	11	33	26	12	1	7
Leger	October 6, 2024	PDF	1,036	±3.04%	25	11	26	28	9	2	2
Leger	August 25, 2024	PDF	1,041	±3.04%	23	13	30	19	11	3	7

== Results ==
Candidate	Round 1		Runoff	
Candidate	Points	%	Points	%
Pablo Rodriguez	145,878	39	195,602	52.3
Charles Milliard	107,345	28.7	178,398	47.7
Karl Blackburn	103,265	27.6	Eliminated	
Marc Bélanger	14,659	3.9	Eliminated	
Mario Roy	2,853	0.8	Eliminated	
Total	374,000	100.00	374,000	100.00

== Aftermath ==
In November 2025, Rodriguez served a legal notice to newspaper Le Journal de Montréal, after it reported that Quebec Liberal Party members were allegedly financially rewarded for voting for Rodriguez in the leadership election; he denied the accusations. The payments were reportedly nicknamed "brownies". In December 2025, the François Legault government passed legislation that banned vote buying in municipal and provincial leadership elections. In March 2026, newspaper La Presse reported that the Unité permanente anticorruption where possibly questioning the authenticity of the allegations made by the Le Journal. In August 2026, newspaper La Presse also reported that Chief Electoral Officer of Quebec (DGEQ) and the UPAC believed that was no evidence that Rodriguez benefited from or was aware of the vote-buying scheme.

After mounting criticism from within the party, Rodriguez resigned as leader in December 2025; Milliard would succeed him in February 2026.

== See also ==
- Quebec Liberal Party leadership elections
- 2025 Liberal Party of Canada leadership election
