= 2026 Quebec Liberal Party leadership election =

Provincial party election in Canada

- February 13, 2026
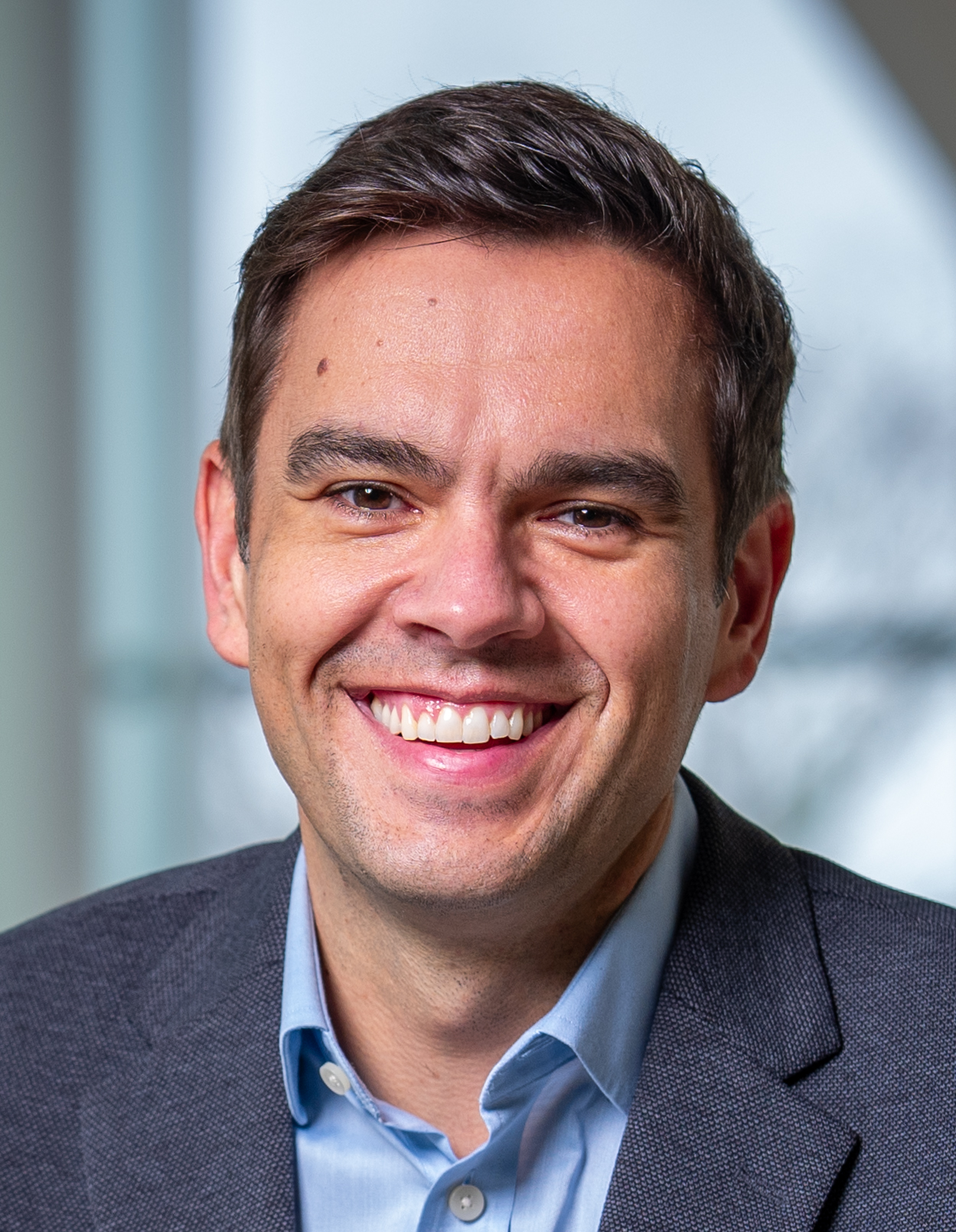
Candidate	Charles Milliard
First ballot	Acclaimed
Leader before election
Marc Tanguay (interim)
Elected Leader
Charles Milliard

2026 Quebec Liberal Party leadership election
- Date: February 13, 2026
- Resigning leader: Pablo Rodriguez
- Won by: Charles Milliard
- Ballots: None
- Candidates: 1
- Entrance fee: $30,000
- Spending limit: $120,000

In 2026, the Quebec Liberal Party announced a leadership election to choose a permanent successor to Pablo Rodriguez. Rodriguez announced his resignation on December 17, 2025, amid a political crisis and scandal. Businessman and pharmacist Charles Milliard was acclaimed as party leader on February 13 as no other candidates qualified on the ballot.

== Background ==
In the preceding 2025 leadership election, former federal Cabinet minister Pablo Rodriguez was elected on the second ballot against former Quebec Chamber of Commerce president Charles Milliard by less than 5 percentage points. After winning the leadership, Rodriguez appointed MNA Marwah Rizqy as parliamentary leader. She was removed as leader by Rodriguez in November 2025, after Rizqy fired her chief of staff without consulting him. The same month, he served a legal notice to newspaper Le Journal de Montréal, after it reported that Quebec Liberal Party members were allegedly financially rewarded for voting for Rodriguez in the leadership election; he denied the accusations. The Unité permanente anticorruption confirmed that it opened an investigation in December 2025, and many former Liberal MNAs called for Rodriguez to resign. After weeks of party turmoil, Rodriguez announced his resignation as party leader to his caucus on December 17, 2025, triggering the 2026 leadership election. The election was held just months before the 2026 general election. During the campaign, Milliard raised $95,320 while Mario Roy raised $250.

== Rules and procedures ==
The race officially started on January 12, 2026. The candidate registration period ran until February 13, 2026. To be registered in the race, candidates needed to collect signatures from 750 members in good standing. Candidates also needed to make a $30,000 deposit to participate. The spending limit was $120,000, excluding the deposit. If more than one candidate qualified to be on the ballot, a leadership convention was to take place on March 14, 2026.

== Timeline ==
- December 17, 2025 – Pablo Rodriguez resigns as party leader amid a political crisis.
- December 19, 2025 – LaFontaine MNA Marc Tanguay is named interim leader.
- December 23, 2025 – The party announces the rules for the leadership contest.
- January 6, 2026 – Businessman and pharmacist Charles Milliard announces his candidacy for the QLP leadership. Farmer and economist Mario Roy also declares his candidacy.
- January 12, 2026 – Leadership campaign period start date.
- January 12, 2026 – Roy's candidacy is not approved by the party's "green light" committee due to remaining debts from the 2025 leadership election.
- February 13, 2026 – Last day for candidate registration, with a deadline of 5pm EST; Milliard acclaimed as party leader.
- ~~March 14, 2026 – Leadership election results were to be announced.~~ (Since Milliard has been acclaimed as party leader.)

== Candidates ==
=== Declared ===
Candidate	Experience	Announcement date	Campaign	Ref.
Charles Milliard	Runner-up in the 2025 leadership election; President of the Quebec Federation of Chambers of Commerce (2020–2024); Pharmacist	January 6, 2026	Endorsements; Website	

=== Failed to qualify ===
Candidate	Experience	Announcement date	Rejection date	Ref.
Mario Roy	Placed fifth in the 2025 leadership election; Farmer; Economist	January 6, 2026	January 29, 2026	

=== Declined ===
- Dominique Anglade, leader of the Quebec Liberal Party (2020–2022), Leader of the Opposition of Quebec (2020–2022), Deputy Premier of Quebec (2017–2018), MNA for Saint-Henri–Sainte-Anne (2015–2022).
- Marc Bélanger, lawyer in international trade, fiscalist, placed fourth in the 2025 leadership election.
- Karl Blackburn, president of the Conseil du patronat du Québec (2020–2025), director general of the Quebec Liberal Party (2009–2013), MNA for Roberval (2003–2007), placed third in the 2025 leadership election.
- Sophie Brochu, president and chief executive officer of Hydro-Québec (2020–2023).
- Guy Cormier, president and chief executive officer of Desjardins Group (2016–2025).
- François-Philippe Champagne, Minister of Finance and National Revenue (2025–present), MP for Saint-Maurice—Champlain (2015–present).
- Yves Desjardins-Siciliano, chief executive officer of VIA Rail (2014- 2019)
- André Fortin, parliamentary leader of the Quebec Liberal Party (2025), Leader of the Opposition of Quebec (2025), MNA for Pontiac (2014–present). (Endorsed Milliard)
- Steven Guilbeault, Minister of Environment and Climate Change (2021–2025), MP for Laurier—Sainte-Marie (2019–present).
- Mélanie Joly, Minister of Industry (2025–present), MP for Ahuntsic-Cartierville (2015–present).
- Marwah Rizqy, parliamentary leader of the Quebec Liberal Party (2025), Leader of the Opposition of Quebec (2025), MNA for Saint-Laurent (2018–present).
- Marc Tanguay, interim leader of the Quebec Liberal Party (2025–present, 2022–2025), Leader of the Opposition of Quebec (2025–present, 2022–2025), MNA for LaFontaine (2012–present).
- Louis Vachon, president and chief executive officer of the National Bank of Canada (2007–2021).

== Endorsements ==
Endorsements of Charles Milliard

Current caucus members:

- Frédéric Beauchemin, MNA for Marguerite-Bourgeoys (2022–present).
- Frantz Benjamin, MNA for Viau (2018–present), Montreal city councillor for Saint-Michel (2009–2018).
- Madwa-Nika Cadet, MNA for Bourassa-Sauvé (2022–present).
- Linda Caron, MNA for La Pinière (2022–present).
- Virginie Dufour, MNA for Mille-Îles (2022–present), Laval city councillor for Sainte-Rose (2013–2021).
- André Fortin, Minister of Transport, Sustainable Mobility and Transport Electrification (2017–2018), MNA for Pontiac (2014–present).
- Brigitte Garceau, MNA for Robert-Baldwin (2022–present).
- Greg Kelley, MNA for Jacques-Cartier (2018–present).
- Jennifer Maccarone, MNA for Westmount–Saint-Louis (2018–present).
- Désirée McGraw, MNA for Notre-Dame-de-Grâce (2022–present).
- André A. Morin, MNA for Acadie (2022–present).
- Marie-Claude Nichols, MNA for Vaudreuil (2014–present).
- Elisabeth Prass, MNA for D'Arcy-McGee (2022–present).
- Michelle Setlakwe, MNA for Mont-Royal–Outremont (2022–present).

Former municipal politicians:

- Jean Lamarche, Mayor of Trois-Rivières (2019–2025)

== Opinion polling ==
=== General election ===
==== Charles Milliard as leader ====
Polling organisation	Last date of polling	Source	Sample size	MoE	CAQ	QS	PQ	PLQ	PCQ	Other	Lead
Léger	January 29, 2025		742	–	13	8	34	28	14	4	6

== See also ==
- Quebec Liberal Party leadership elections
- 2026 Coalition Avenir Québec leadership election
