= 2020 Quebec Liberal Party leadership election =

Canadian provincial party election

- May 11, 2020
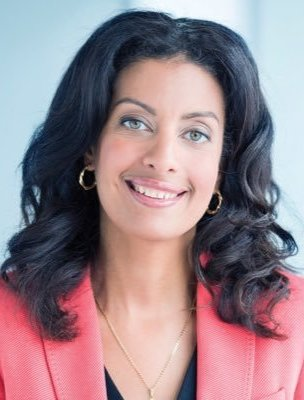
Candidate	Dominique Anglade
Votes	Acclaimed
Previous Leader
Pierre Arcand (interim)
Leader
Dominique Anglade

2020 Quebec Liberal Party leadership election
- Date: May 11, 2020
- Resigning leader: Philippe Couillard
- Won by: Dominique Anglade
- Ballots: Acclamation
- Candidates: 1
- Entrance fee: $60,000
- Spending limit: $500,000

The 2020 Quebec Liberal Party leadership election was to have taken place from May 30–31, 2020 after outgoing leader Philippe Couillard resigned on October 4, 2018, and left politics after the party finished second in the 2018 Quebec general election. On March 20, 2020, the party suspended the election indefinitely due to the COVID-19 pandemic in Quebec. On May 11, 2020, candidate Alexandre Cusson withdrew from the race and after a meeting of the party's executive committee, the sole remaining candidate, Dominique Anglade, was selected as leader by acclamation.

This made her the first woman to lead the Quebec Liberal Party, and the first Black woman to lead a provincial party in Quebec. Anglade led the Liberals into the 2022 Quebec general election, The Liberals dropped to their lowest raw seat count since 1956, their lowest percentage of seats won since 1948 and their lowest share of the popular vote in their history.

== Background ==
Philippe Couillard, who won the 2013 leadership election and led the party to victory in the 2014 Quebec election resigned on October 4, 2018, after the party's second-place finish in the 2018 Quebec general election. The Liberal Party fell from 68 seats to 32 seats and only captured 25% of the popular vote, the party's lowest since Confederation.

On October 5, Pierre Arcand was named interim leader.

== Rules and procedures ==
On May 5, 2019, the party adopted the rules to govern the leadership election. For the first time in the party's history, the leadership would not be decided by a delegated convention but a vote of the party membership. The vote would be weighted to ensure equal regional representation by use of a points system: each of Quebec's 125 ridings would be worth 2,000 points, and the youth wing would be afforded 125,000, for a total of 375,000. A candidate would need a simple majority, or 187,501 points, to win. The entry fee was $60,000, with a maximum spending limit of $500,000.

However, on May 11, 2020, after Alexandre Cusson withdrew from the race and left Dominique Anglade as the sole candidate, the party's executive committee met and declared Anglade the leader by acclamation.

== Declared candidates ==
=== Dominique Anglade ===
Background: MNA for Saint-Henri–Sainte-Anne (2015–), Deputy Premier and Minister of Economic Development under Couillard.
Date announced: June 27, 2019

== Withdrawn candidates ==
=== Alexandre Cusson ===
Background: Mayor of Drummondville, former president of the l’Union des municipalités du Québec.
Date announced: November 23, 2019
Withdrew: May 11, 2020

== Declined ==
- Pierre Arcand, MNA for Mont-Royal and Mont-Royal–Outremont (2008–2022), Minister of International Relations and La Francophonie and Minister of Sustainable Development and Environment under Charest; Minister of Energy and Natural Resources, President of the Treasury Board and Minister of Governmental Administration and of the Permanent Revision of Programs, Minister responsible for the Lanaudière, Laurentides, Plan Nord and Côte-Nord under Couillard; interim leader
- Gaétan Barrette, MNA for La Pinière (2014–2022), Minister of Health and Social Services under Couillard
- Denis Coderre, MP for Bourassa (1997-2013), Federal Interlocutor for Métis and Non-Status Indians (2003-2004), President of the Queen's Privy Council for Canada (2003-2004), Minister of State (Financial Institutions) (2003-2004), Minister responsible for the Office of Indian Residential Schools Resolution (2003-2004), Minister responsible for La Francophonie (2003-2004), (Note: The Cabinet positions from 2003 to 2004 were under former Prime Minister Paul Martin) LPC's Quebec lieutenant (2009-2009) (Note: under Michael Ignatieff) and former Mayor of Montreal (2013-2017).
- André Fortin, MNA for Pontiac (2015–), Minister of Transportation under Couillard
- Carlos Leitao, MNA for Robert-Baldwin (2014–2022), Minister of Finance, and President of the Treasury Board and Minister of Governmental Administration and of the Permanent Revision of Programs under Couillard (Note: Endorsed Anglade)
- Marie Montpetit, MNA for Maurice-Richard, Minister of Culture and Communications, and Minister for the Protection and Promotion of the French language under Couillard
- Pierre Moreau, MNA for Marguerite-D'Youville (2003-2007), MNA for Châteauguay (2008-2018), Minister responsible for Canadian Intergovernmental Affairs and the Canadian Francophonie, Minister responsible for the Reform of Democratic Institutions and Access to Information and Minister of Transportation under Charest; President of the Treasury Board and Minister of Governmental Administration and of the Permanent Revision of Programs, Minister of Municipal Affairs and Land Occupancy, Minister of Education, Minister of Energy and Natural Resources and Minister responsible for the Montérégie under Couillard
- Sébastien Proulx, MNA for Trois-Rivières (2007–08) for the Action démocratique du Québec, MNA for Jean-Talon (2015–19), Minister of Education, Minister of Families, and Minister responsible for the Capitale-Nationale and Gaspésie–Îles-de-la-Madeleine under Couillard
- Marwah Rizqy, MNA for Saint-Laurent (2018-) (Note: Endorsed Cusson)
- Christine St-Pierre, MNA for Acadie (2007–2022), Minister of Culture and Communications under Jean Charest, Minister of International Relations under Couillard
- Alexandre Taillefer, businessman and president of the 2018 Liberal campaign

== Opinion polling ==
=== Liberal supporters ===
Polling firm	Last date of polling	Sample size	Link	Margin of error	Denis Coderre	Dominique Anglade	Alexandre Cusson	Pierre Moreau	Pierre Arcand	Sophie Brochu	Alexandre Taillefer	André Fortin	Alexandre Boulay	Other	Lead
Léger Marketing	November 25, 2019	246	PDF	N/A	19%	12%	8%	5%	3%	2%	3%	2%	1%	Undecided/refused to answer 44%	7%

=== All Quebecers ===
Polling firm	Last date of polling	Sample size	Link	Margin of error	Denis Coderre	Dominique Anglade	Alexandre Cusson	Pierre Moreau	Sophie Brochu	Pierre Arcand	Alexandre Taillefer	François-Philippe Champagne	André Fortin	Other	Lead
Léger Marketing	November 25, 2019	1000	PDF	± 3,1%	16%	8%	6%	4%	3%	3%	3%	2%	2%	Alexandre Boulay 1% Undecided/refused to answer 53%	8%

== See also ==
- Quebec Liberal Party leadership elections
