= Charles Milliard =

Canadian politician (born 1979)

Charles Milliard MNA
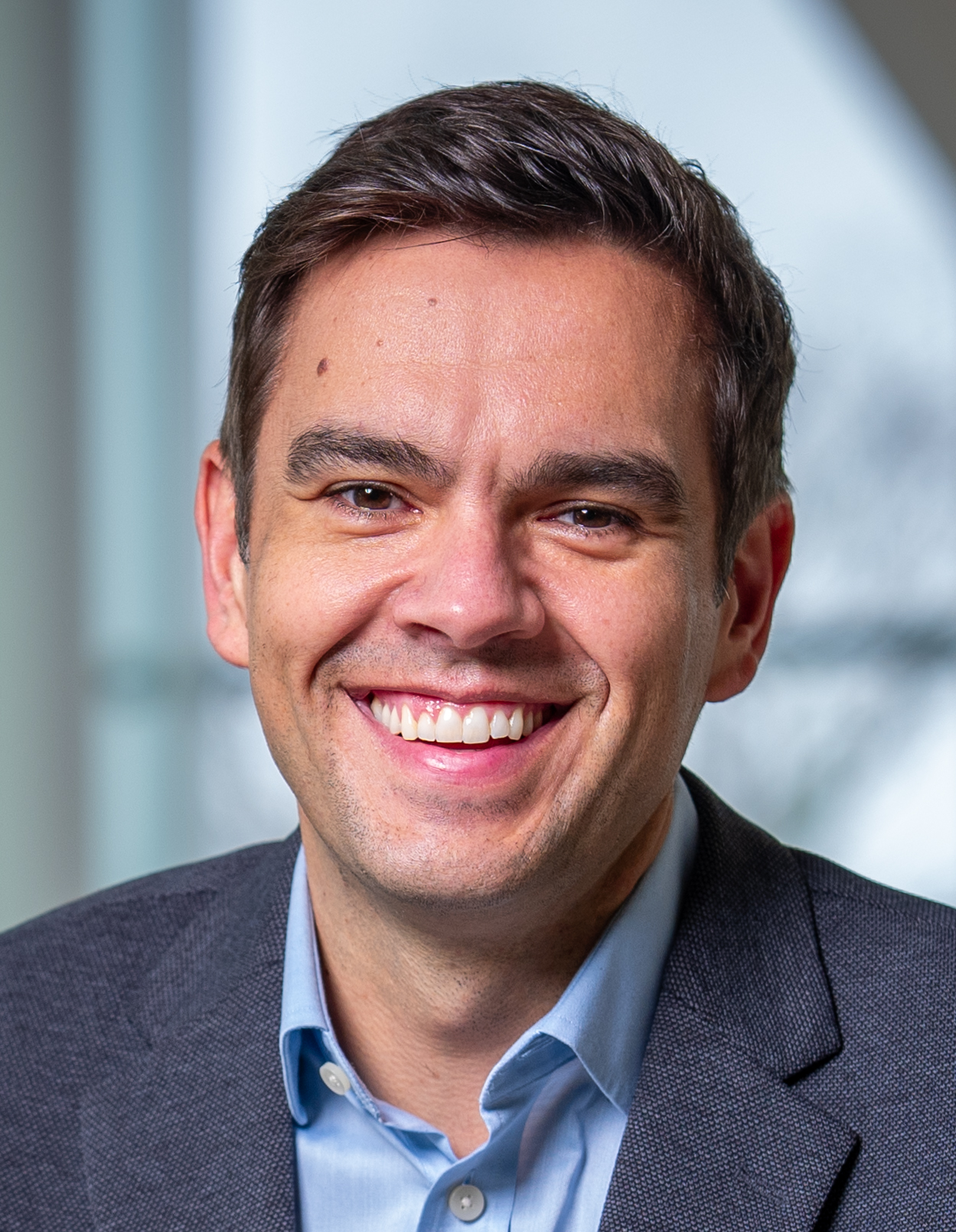
- Milliard in 2024

Leader of the Opposition of Quebec
- Incumbent
- Assumed office October 5, 2026
- Preceded by: André Fortin

Leader of the Quebec Liberal Party
- Incumbent
- Assumed office February 13, 2026
- President: Rafael Primeau Ferraro
- Preceded by: Marc Tanguay (interim)

Member of the National Assembly for Orford
- Incumbent
- Assumed office October 5, 2026
- Preceded by: Gilles Bélanger

President of the Fédération des chambres de commerce du Québec
- In office January 13, 2020 – June 11, 2024
- Preceded by: Stéphane Forget
- Succeeded by: Claude Breton (interim)

Personal details
- Born: September 10, 1979 (age 47) Lévis, Quebec, Canada
- Party: Quebec Liberal Party
- Other political affiliations: Progressive Conservative (1997–2000)
- Domestic partner: Simon Dessureault Dallaire (2022–)
- Education: Université Laval
- Profession: Pharmacist, professor

Charles Milliard (French pronunciation: [ʃaʁl(ə) miljaʁ]; born September 10, 1979) is a Canadian politician, businessman, and pharmacist who has served as the leader of the Quebec Liberal Party and leader of the Opposition of Quebec since 2026. At the 2026 Quebec general election he was elected member of the National Assembly of Quebec for Orford. He served as the president of the Quebec Federation of Chambers of Commerce (FCCQ) from 2020 to 2024.

== Early life and education ==
Charles Milliard was born in Lévis in the Chaudière-Appalaches region to a carpenter-joiner father and a French teacher mother, who later became a high school principal, both from Kamouraska in the Bas-Saint-Laurent. He has a brother, who is a pharmacist in the Mauricie region. His aunt Louise Chamberland is the mayor of Saint-Pacôme, Quebec, which is also located in Kamouraska.

Milliard holds a bachelor's degree in pharmacy and a certificate in economics from Université Laval, obtained in 2002. He was the president of the Canadian Pharmacy Students' Association. He continued his studies, obtaining a postgraduate certificate in management in 2005 and completed an master of business administration at HEC Montréal in 2007.

== Professional career ==
From 2003 until 2016, Milliard held several positions within Uniprix, a chain of drugstores, before becoming its executive vice-president from 2013 to 2017. He was seen on the show Deux filles le matin, presenting a segment on medications.

Between 2017 and 2019, he held various positions, including vice president of the public relations firm National Public Relations. He was then responsible for provincial, national and international mandates related to the health sector. In 2019, Milliard became président-directeur général of the Fédération des Chambres de commerce du Québec (FCCQ) before announcing his resignation in June 2024.

Millard was also on the board of directors of Festival de Lanaudière and Festival TransAmériques. As chair of the Lanaudière Festival, he modelled the event after the Stratford Festival by enhancing the visitor experience, developed agritourism, and improved hospitality infrastructure.

Following the 2025 leadership campaign, Milliard accepted a position at Bishop's University's Williams School of Business for the fall 2025 term.

== Political career ==
When Milliard was eighteen, he started to become involved with the Quebec Liberal Party (PLQ). From 1997 to 2000, he was also involved with the Progressive Conservatives Youth Federation. In 2024, Milliard was approached by the Liberal Party of Canada to be their candidate in the 2024 LaSalle–Émard–Verdun federal by-election. He revealed that he considered it but ultimately declined to do so in order to focus on the upcoming QLP leadership race.

In 2024, Milliard declared his candidacy for the 2025 Quebec Liberal Party leadership election on LinkedIn. He stood against former federal Minister of Transport Pablo Rodriguez, who was the front runner, Marc Bélanger, Karl Blackburn and Mario Roy. Milliard ran on generational renewal and focused his platform on the issues of the economy, education, health and transportation. He stated that political vision around engagement should be inspirational not hostile. Milliard was defeated by Rodriguez with a narrow margin of roughly 52% to 48% in the second round.

After Rodriguez's resignation in December 2025, Milliard declared his candidacy for the party's 2026 leadership election in January. At his official campaign launch, Millard revealed his five priorities were public services, the economy, housing, regions and culture. He was acclaimed as party leader on February 13, 2026, after no other candidates qualified to be on the ballot. Milliard became the first openly gay person to lead the provincial Liberal party in Quebec.

=== Leader of the Quebec Liberal Party ===
In his first speech since being acclaimed as leader of the party, Milliard established his five priorities which were the economy, public services, access to housing, the regions and culture. On February 28th, Milliard announced that he will seek to be elected to the National Assembly of Quebec in the Estrie riding of Orford. This was his first election.

In the 2026 Quebec general election he was elected member of the National Assembly of Quebec for Orford. In the election the Liberals doubled their seats to 39. The Liberals formed the Official Opposition again. After the election, Milliard stated he would form an opposition that would be open to collaborate but defend the values of the party which he describe as social justice, generational fairness, respect for the rule of law, attachment to Quebec and Canada.

== Views ==
Milliard stated that he supports federalism but considered himself a Quebec nationalist in the vein of former Quebec premier Robert Bourassa. He also mentioned that his politics would be modelled after a version of the defunct Progressive Conservative Party of Canada.

=== Economy ===
During the 2025 leadership race, Milliard advocated for economic renewal through targeted support for small and medium-sized enterprises (SMEs) by reducing SME tax rate from 11.5% to 10%. He also opposed raising personal taxes. Milliard advocated for the dismantlement of interprovincial and international trade barriers. For youth employment, he supported mandatory paid internships for students. For the budget deficit, Milliard supports balancing the budget in five years but opposed the austerity implemented by the government of Philippe Couillard by stating that he would not cut health services, education, and culture.

In 2026, Milliard wanted to focus on regional development and create new partnerships with municipalities. He also advocated for new wealth generation methods to pay for Quebec's social safety net and was critical of Coalition Avenir Québec (CAQ) support for large foreign companies over SME. During a speech made at the Chamber of Commerce of Metropolitan Montreal, Milliard advocated for the renovation and modernization of the Montreal metro and restoration of Quebec's reputation as an economic leader by creating a favorable business environment for the implementation of economic projects and reduction of subsidies for large corporations.

=== Social issues ===
During the 2025 leadership race, Milliard stated that he does not consider himself as part of the social right. He expressed concerns about the shift against minorities of sexual, gender, religious and cultural. Milliard believed that government must be a bulwark against all types of marginalization. He supported moving the Office for the Fight Against Homophobia and Transphobia from the Ministry for the Status of Women to Ministry of Justice, supported the prevention and education of HIV and was critical of the anti-LGBTQ+ movement in the United States of America.

On the legal challenge to Bill 21 in the Supreme Court of Canada, Milliard stated that Quebec is a secular state, but that it is necessary to protect everyone's rights. In 2026, Milliard stated that he would review Supreme Court of Canada decision but stated its importance for Quebecers. He want to change the tone towards how secularism as communicated in order for quebecers to live together and criticized Bill 94 for not preventing situations like the Bedford school.

=== Federalism and Nationalism ===
During the 2025 leadership race, Milliard stressed the importance of unity between Quebec and Canada due to the US Canada Trade War. He also stated that there should be an interest for Canada to work together.

In 2026, Milliard stated that he would model the Quebec-federal government relationship after Robert Bourassa by arguing that Bourassa had the ability to create opportunity which allowed the relationship to work. Milliard considered himself as an asymmetrical federalist and that his version of nationalism does not only mean protecting and promoting French but rights and freedoms of every Quebecer. He advocated for decentralization in Quebec and the empowerment of its municipalities. Milliard wants to strengthen the province’s influence within Canada and advocated to form an alliance with Ontario that is modeled after the western provinces.

=== Linguistic rights and culture ===
During the 2025 leadership race, Milliard emphasized that the party should reestablish its relationship with the anglophone community by arguing that the party took them for granted by not viewing the community as part of Quebec identity. He rejected the CAQ premise that being against Bill 96, which he believes should be modified, means being against the promotion and protection of French in Quebec. He found the clause requiring immigrants to communicate only in French six months after their arrival impossible to implement and argued that the bill creates burdens for small- and medium-sized businesses. In 2026 leadership race, Milliard believed that French is threatened in Quebec and that it should be protected but added that those who wanted to learn the language should be supported. He believed that immigrants are willing to subscribe but the government is not supporting them. During a speech made at the Chamber of Commerce of Metropolitan Montreal, he saw French as gateway to other markets not a hindrance to economic development.

In 2023, as head of the federation, Milliard viewed culture as a tool to drive regional economic development. In 2026, he also views it as a tool to integrate immigrants into Quebec society. Milliard stressed the importance of protecting cultural institutions and the importance of promoting culture as a way to protect Quebec. He warned that people consumed culture through international digital platforms but expressed support for developing polices that would allow Quebec artists to become popular internationally, like Céline Dion.

=== Public services ===
==== Healthcare ====
During the 2025 leadership race, Milliard emphasized that the healthcare system should be based on prevention, innovation, and efficiency. He has suggested legislation that would match their health-care workers' salary with their Ontario counterparts, along with a two-hundred-million-dollar investment into regional health-care infrastructure and workforce retention. Milliard also supported the creation of a public telemedicine clinic accessible every day of the week, increased the number of college and university health programs, promoted family medicine in every region, and proposed aligning private healthcare costs with a public network. He has suggested modifying the list of acts reserved for different professions, to increase the use of nurses, pharmacists, psychologists and physiotherapists.

In his announcement speech during the 2026 race, Milliard emphasized the need to improve home care and frontline services and create a public telemedicine service.

==== Education ====
During the 2025 leadership race, Milliard argued that modernizing the curriculum can reduce dropout rates, particularly among young males. He has proposed adjusting how Quebec history is taught so that the history of minority groups in the province are better reflected. In addition, he proposed the creation of a professional order for teachers to receive standardized training.

In 2026, he stated that he would like to see a national conference on education which would review the system from preschool to university. During a speech made at the Chamber of Commerce of Metropolitan Montreal, he advocated for investing in college and university research institutions, particularly in the regions. Milliard took issues with the extension of Bill 101 into CEGEPs by stating that their are others ways to protect French without preventing those who want to perfect a second language by pointing towards francophone parents who want children to succeed. Milliard wants people to start learning French by establishing it through interest, passion, and desire at a very young age and has suggested by making reading a priority.

=== Environment and housing ===
In January 2022, as head of the federation, Milliard supported the fight against urban sprawl. He argued it would be an important issue in the future. In July 2023, Milliard took out an op-ed in La Presse advocating two simultaneous industrial revolutions to boost productivity and decarbonize the economy in order to adapt to climate change. After being acclaimed as the leader of the party, he stated that he would aim to make Quebec a leader in green innovation and sustainable mobility. Milliard personally took issue with Quebec Conservative MNA Maïté Blanchette Vézina comments about agreeing with scientific conclusions on climate change.

In 2026, Milliard supported the removal of certain regulations in order to improve housing construction and build 100,000 homes per year in Quebec. He added that this goal includes social and affordable housing.

=== Immigration and integration ===
During his time, as head of the federation, Milliard did not see immigration as the only solution to the labour shortage in Quebec. He also stressed that immigration thresholds were not as important to the debate as the capacity to accommodate them through medical and educational services, French language resources, and housing in each region. In 2026, Milliard was critical of the CAQ and the Parti Québécois for creating a negative discord surrounding immigrants, arguing that the negativity was a distraction that got Quebec into its current situation and advocating a kinder tone towards immigrants.

During the 2025 leadership race, Milliard proposed passing a new bill stating that interculturalism should be the official integration model in Quebec. He was critical of Bill 84 argued that it supported assimilation, which he opposed, and found the bill too performative. During a speech made at the Chamber of Commerce of Metropolitan Montreal, he advocated repairing Quebec's reputation on immigration by being inclusive through teaching French in exchange for a commitment to contribute to the economy and embrace the local culture.

== Personal life ==
Milliard is bilingual. During his time with the FCCQ, he lived in Montreal but moved to North Hatley, Quebec in 2024. Milliard is openly gay and has been living with his partner, Simon Dessureault Dallaire, since 2022.

== Electoral record ==
2026 Quebec general election: Orford
** Preliminary results — Not yet official **
Party	Candidate	Votes	%	±%
Liberal	Charles Milliard	13,080	37.80	
Parti Québécois	Jocelyn Caron	8,664	25.04	
Conservative	Benoit Robitaille	4,785	13.83	
Coalition Avenir Québec	Allison Turner	4,113	11.89	
Québec solidaire	Eve-Lyne Clusiault	3,349	9.68	
Parti nul	David Cherniak	168	0.49	
Présence	Lucie Pinard	158	0.46	
Canadian	Ngaire DeNora	147	0.42	
Climat Québec	Madeleine Smith	138	0.40	
Total valid votes				
Total rejected ballots				
Turnout			72.95	
Electors on the lists			–	–
Source: Élections Québec
