= Daniel Johnson Jr. =

Premier of Quebec in 1994

Daniel Johnson Jr. GOQ
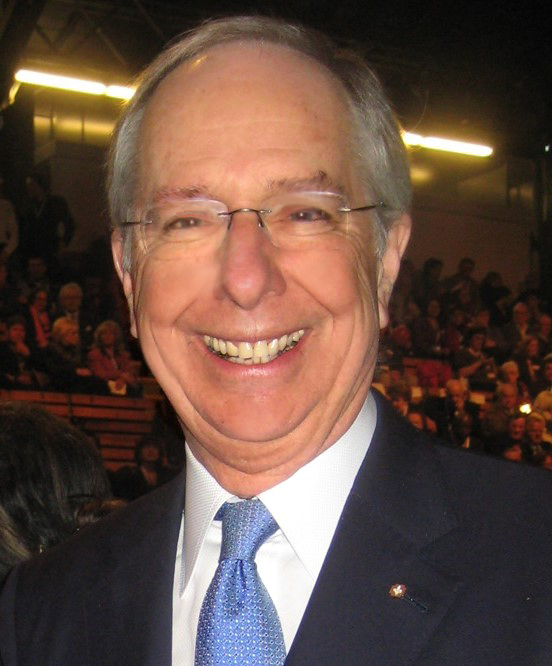
- Johnson at the Quebec Liberal Party Leadership Convention in 2013

25th Premier of Quebec
- In office January 11, 1994 – September 26, 1994
- Monarch: Elizabeth II
- Lieutenant Governor: Martial Asselin
- Deputy: Monique Gagnon-Tremblay
- Preceded by: Robert Bourassa
- Succeeded by: Jacques Parizeau

Leader of the Opposition of Quebec
- In office September 26, 1994 – May 12, 1998
- Preceded by: Jacques Parizeau
- Succeeded by: Monique Gagnon-Tremblay

Leader of the Quebec Liberal Party
- In office December 14, 1993 – April 30, 1998
- Preceded by: Robert Bourassa
- Succeeded by: Jean Charest
Quebec Executive Council
President of the Treasury Board
In office June 23, 1988 – January 11, 1994
| Premier | Robert Bourassa |
| Vice President | Monique Gagnon-Tremblay |
| Preceded by | Paul Gobeil |
| Succeeded by | Monique Gagnon-Tremblay |
Minister of Industry and Commerce
In office December 12, 1985 – June 23, 1988
| Premier | Robert Bourassa |
| Preceded by | Rodrigue Biron |
| Succeeded by | Pierre MacDonald |
Parliamentary constituencies
Member of the National Assembly of Quebec for Vaudreuil (Vaudreuil-Soulanges; 1981–1989)
In office April 13, 1981 – May 12, 1998
| Preceded by | Louise Sauvé Cuerrier |
| Succeeded by | Yvon Marcoux |

Personal details
- Born: Francis Daniel Johnson Jr. December 24, 1944 (age 81) Montreal, Quebec, Canada
- Party: Quebec Liberal
- Spouse(s): Jocelyne Pelchat (m. 1967; div. 1993) Suzanne Marcil (m. 1993)
- Parent: Daniel Johnson Sr.
- Relatives: Pierre Marc Johnson (brother)
- Education: Université de Montréal; University College London; Harvard Business School
- Profession: Lawyer

Francis Daniel Johnson Jr. GOQ (born December 24, 1944) is a former Canadian politician. He was a member of the Liberal Party of Quebec and was the 25th premier of Quebec for nine months in 1994 until his party's defeat in the provincial general election.

== Life and career ==
Johnson was born in Montreal, Quebec. He is the son of Reine Gagné and Daniel Johnson Sr., who had been the Premier of Quebec from 1966 to his death in 1968, as the leader of the Union Nationale, a conservative political party. His brother is Pierre-Marc Johnson, Parti Québécois leader from 1985 to 1987 and Premier of Quebec from October 3 to December 12, 1985.

Johnson received his Bachelor of Laws degree from the Université de Montréal in 1966. He also received LL.M. and Ph.D. degrees from the University College London in 1968 and 1971 respectively, as well as a Master of Business Administration from the Harvard Business School in 1973. Johnson immediately began his career in the business world and worked for Power Corporation of Canada from 1973 to 1981. He served as the Vice-President of Power Corp. from 1978 to 1981. During that period, Daniel Johnson was active in the Montreal community, acting as Vice-president of the Montreal Chamber of Commerce, and sat on other non-profit boards, such as the Montreal Heart Institute and the Grands Ballets Canadiens.

== Political career ==
Johnson was first elected to the National Assembly of Quebec in the riding of Vaudreuil-Soulanges in the 1981 Quebec general election. He ran for the 1983 Quebec Liberal Party leadership convention but finished third behind Pierre Paradis and winner Robert Bourassa. He was re-elected in the 1985 election, which brought the Liberals to power. He became Minister of Industry and Commerce in the Quebec government, and was Chairman of the Treasury Board from June 1988 until January 1994.

In January 1994, he became leader of the Quebec Liberal Party and Premier of Quebec following the resignation of Liberal leader Robert Bourassa. He then lost the 1994 provincial election to Jacques Parizeau of the Parti Québécois.

During the 1995 Quebec referendum, he headed the "No" federalist campaign, in opposition to the PQ's proposals for Quebec sovereignty. With the sovereignty campaign leading in polls, Prime Minister Jean Chrétien and federal Progressive Conservative leader (and former Deputy Prime Minister) Jean Charest went to the province to help the "No" side campaign. The "No" side narrowly won the referendum.

Johnson served as Liberal party leader and leader of the Opposition until 1998 when he was succeeded by Jean Charest.

== Post-political career ==
Since 1998, Daniel Johnson has acted as senior counsel with the law firm McCarthy Tétrault LLP. He is also a director of exp Global Inc., Bombardier Inc., The Great-West Life Assurance Company, The Investors Group, Ecopia Biosciences inc., and is Chairman of the Board of Victhom Human Bionics in Quebec City.

On April 15, 2008, Johnson was appointed to Bank of Canada's board of directors.

== Elections as party leader ==
Johnson lost the 1994 provincial election.
