= 2013 Quebec Liberal Party leadership election =

Canadian provincial party election

- 17 March 2013
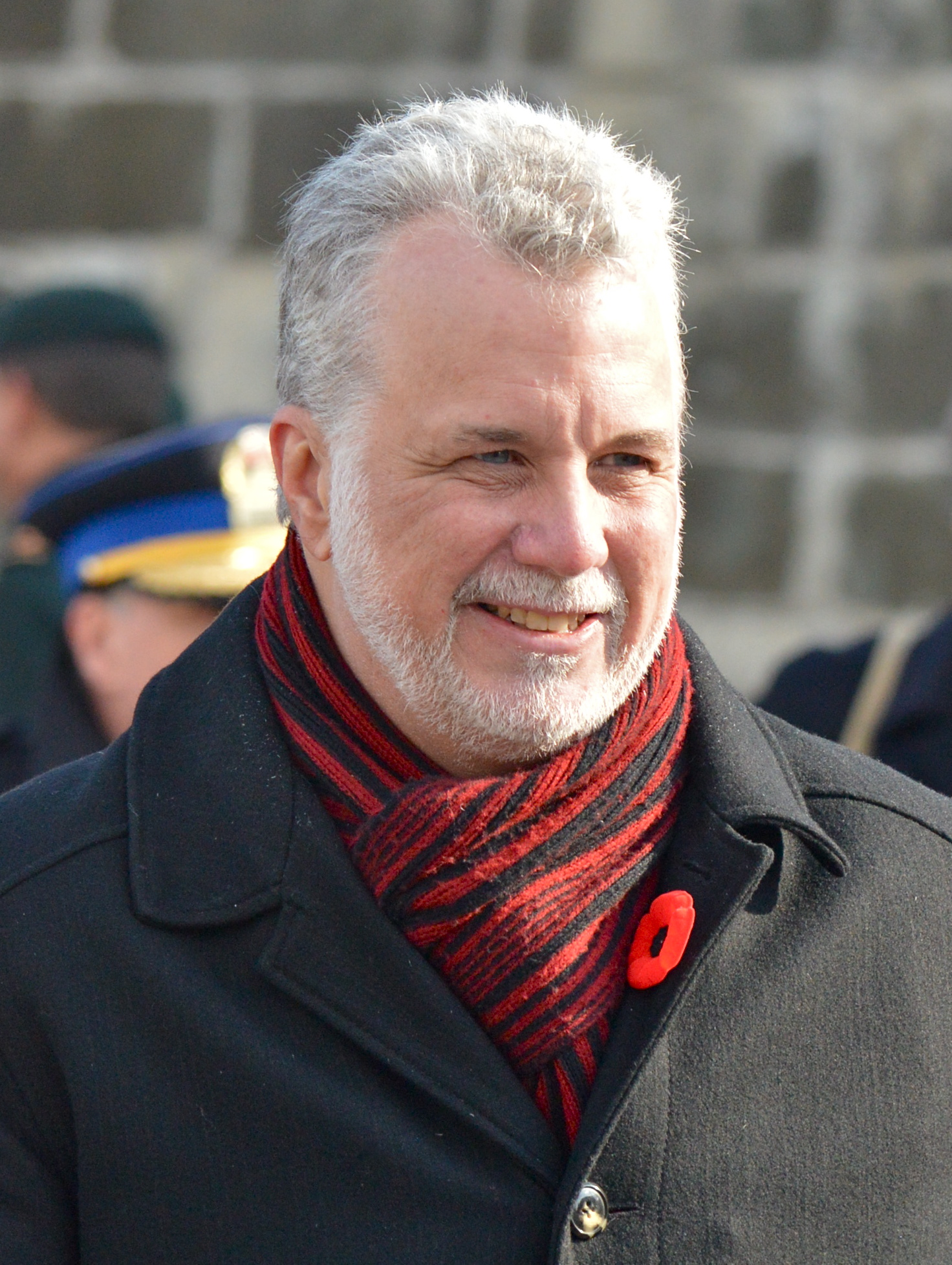

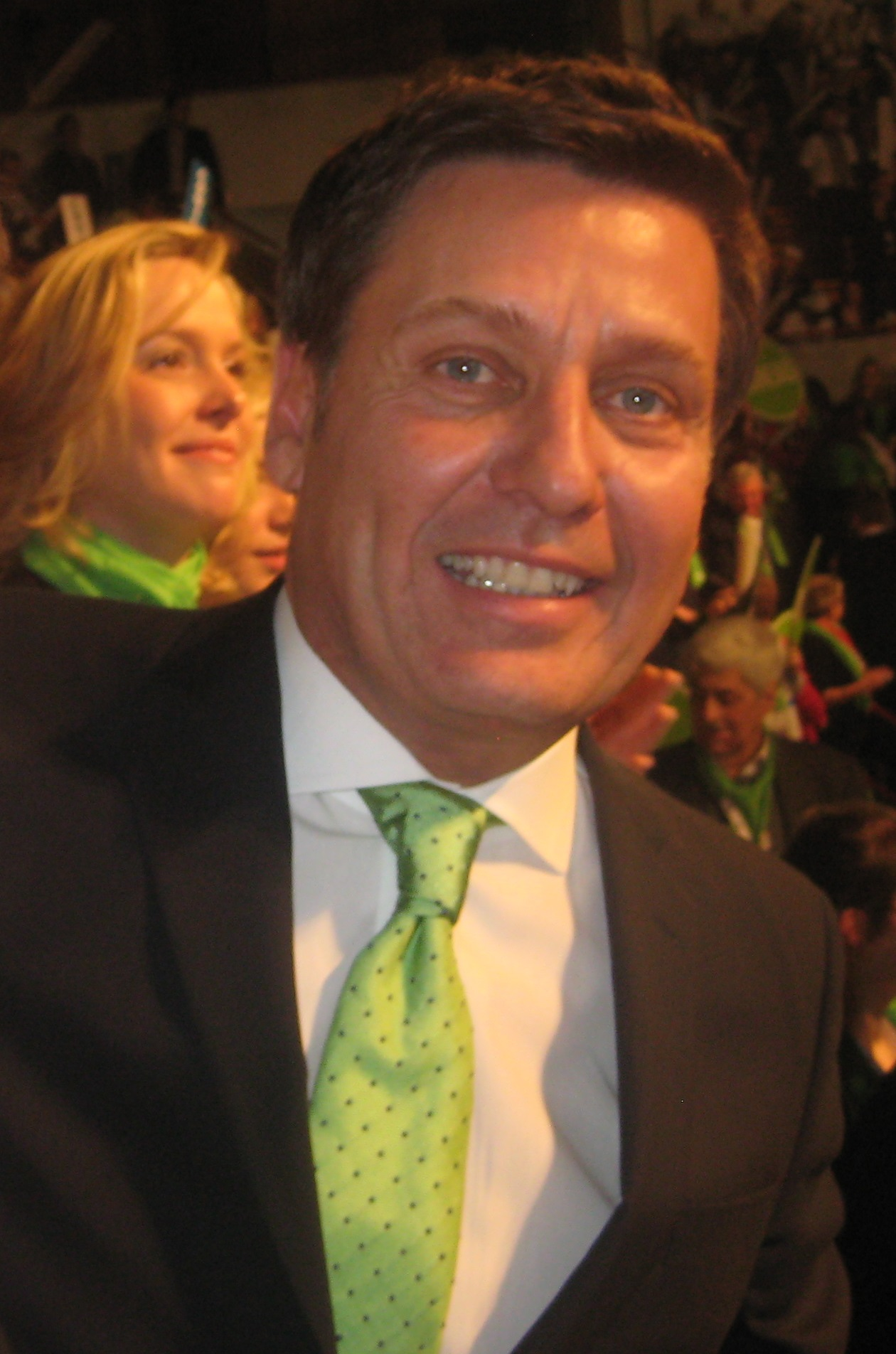

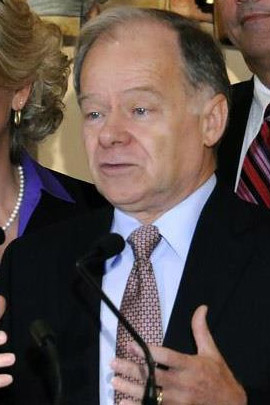
Candidate	Philippe Couillard	Pierre Moreau	Raymond Bachand
Delegate Count	1,390	523	464
Percentage	58.5%	22.0%	19.5%
Leader before election
Jean Charest
Elected Leader
Philippe Couillard

2013 Quebec Liberal Party leadership election
- Date: March 17, 2013
- Convention: Verdun Auditorium, Montreal
- Resigning leader: Jean Charest
- Won by: Philippe Couillard
- Ballots: 1
- Candidates: 3
- Entrance fee: $50,000
- Spending limit: $600,000

The Quebec Liberal Party held a leadership convention in 2013 following Jean Charest's resignation after the party's 2012 election loss. The convention was held March 16–17, 2013, at the Verdun Auditorium in Montreal. The choice of venue was in part influenced by a lack of funds due to a recent drop in donations to the party. Philippe Couillard was elected on the first ballot.

== Procedure ==
Candidates had until December 14, 2012 to be nominated by gathering the signatures of 500 party members from 50 ridings in 10 regions and submitting a $50,000 deposit. There was a $600,000 spending limit. Liberal riding associations in each of the province's 125 ridings were to select 24 delegates between February 4 and March 10, 2013. The party was unable to afford to pay delegates' travel expenses. Instead, the candidates themselves were allowed to reimburse the delegates. There were 5 debates, including one entirely in English. The rules and timeline were formally adopted on October 21, 2012, the day before the official start of the campaign.

The election was done in a traditional leadership convention format, in which delegates on the convention floor chose the leader. Each riding's 24 delegates was supposed to include an equal number of men and women and 8 members of the youth wing, although some ridings were unable to send a full delegation. It was the party's first contested leadership convention since 1983.

== Timeline ==
- April 30, 1998: Jean Charest wins the leadership election to succeed Daniel Johnson, Jr.
- September 4, 2012: The Liberals lose the election, and are reduced to official opposition status.
- September 5, 2012: Jean Charest announces his resignation as party leader.
- October 21, 2012: Party members meet to formally adopt the rules of the race.
- October 22, 2012: Official start of the leadership race.
- December 14, 2012: Deadline to submit candidate nomination.
- February 4 – March 10, 2013: Liberal riding associations select delegates.
- March 17, 2013: Date on which the election was held.

== Candidates ==
=== Official candidates ===
==== Raymond Bachand ====
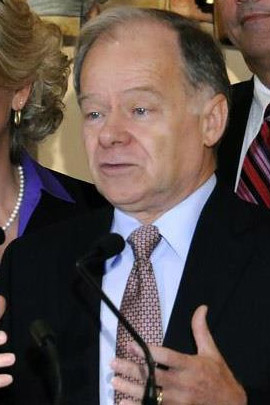
Raymond Bachand

Background

Member of National Assembly for Outremont since 2005. Minister of Finance until 2012, former aide to Parti Québécois Premier René Lévesque.

Date campaign launched: September 28, 2012
Campaign website: raymondbachand.ca
Supporters

- MNAs: (10) Lawrence Bergman, Marguerite Blais, Rita de Santis, André Drolet, Emmanuel Dubourg, Nicole Ménard, Guy Ouellette, Danielle St-Amand, Christine St-Pierre, Lise Thériault
- Past MNAs: (4) Lise Bacon, John Ciaccia, Nathalie Rochefort, Guy Saint-Pierre
- Other prominent individuals: Marc-André Blanchard, former Liberal party president 2000–2008; Andrée Bourassa, widow of former Quebec premier Robert Bourassa; Brian Mulroney, former Prime Minister of Canada

==== Philippe Couillard ====
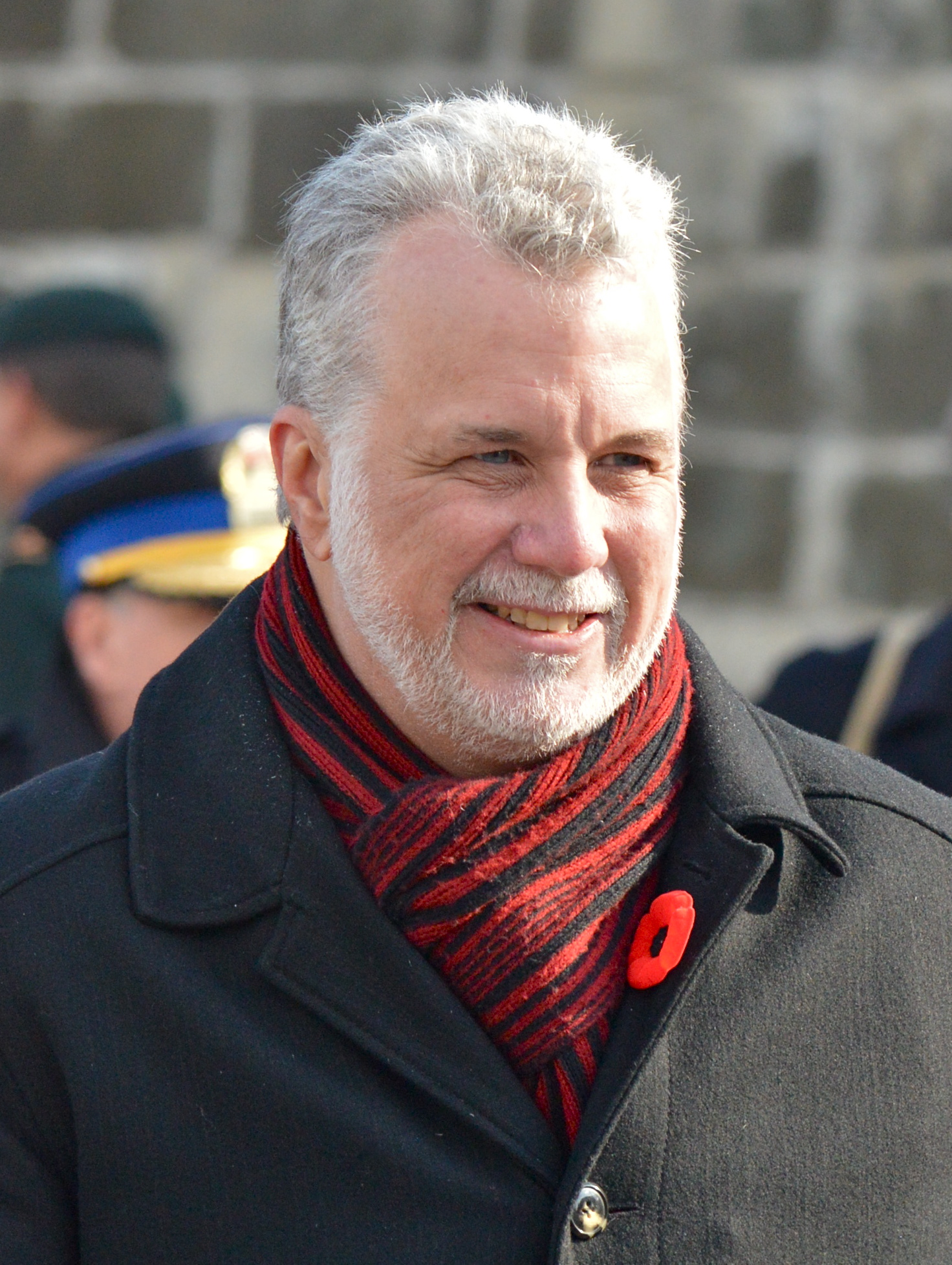
Philippe Couillard

Background

Member of National Assembly for Mont-Royal 2003–2007, Jean-Talon 2007–2008. Minister of Health until 2008.

Date campaign launched: October 3, 2012
Campaign website: philippecouillard.ca
Supporters

- MNAs: (14) Stéphane Billette, Ghislain Bolduc, Yves Bolduc, Jean D'Amour, Jean-Paul Diamond, Henri-François Gautrin, Sam Hamad, Alexandre Iracà, Yvon Marcoux, Pierre Reid, Jean Rousselle, Gerry Sklavounos, Marc Tanguay, Kathleen Weil
- Past MNAs: (12) Michel Audet, Raymond Bernier, Raymond Garneau, Patrick Huot, Clifford Lincoln, Norman MacMillan, Michel Matte, Alain Paquet, Jean-Pierre Paquin, Benoît Pelletier, Michel Pigeon, Serge Simard
- Other prominent individuals:

==== Pierre Moreau ====
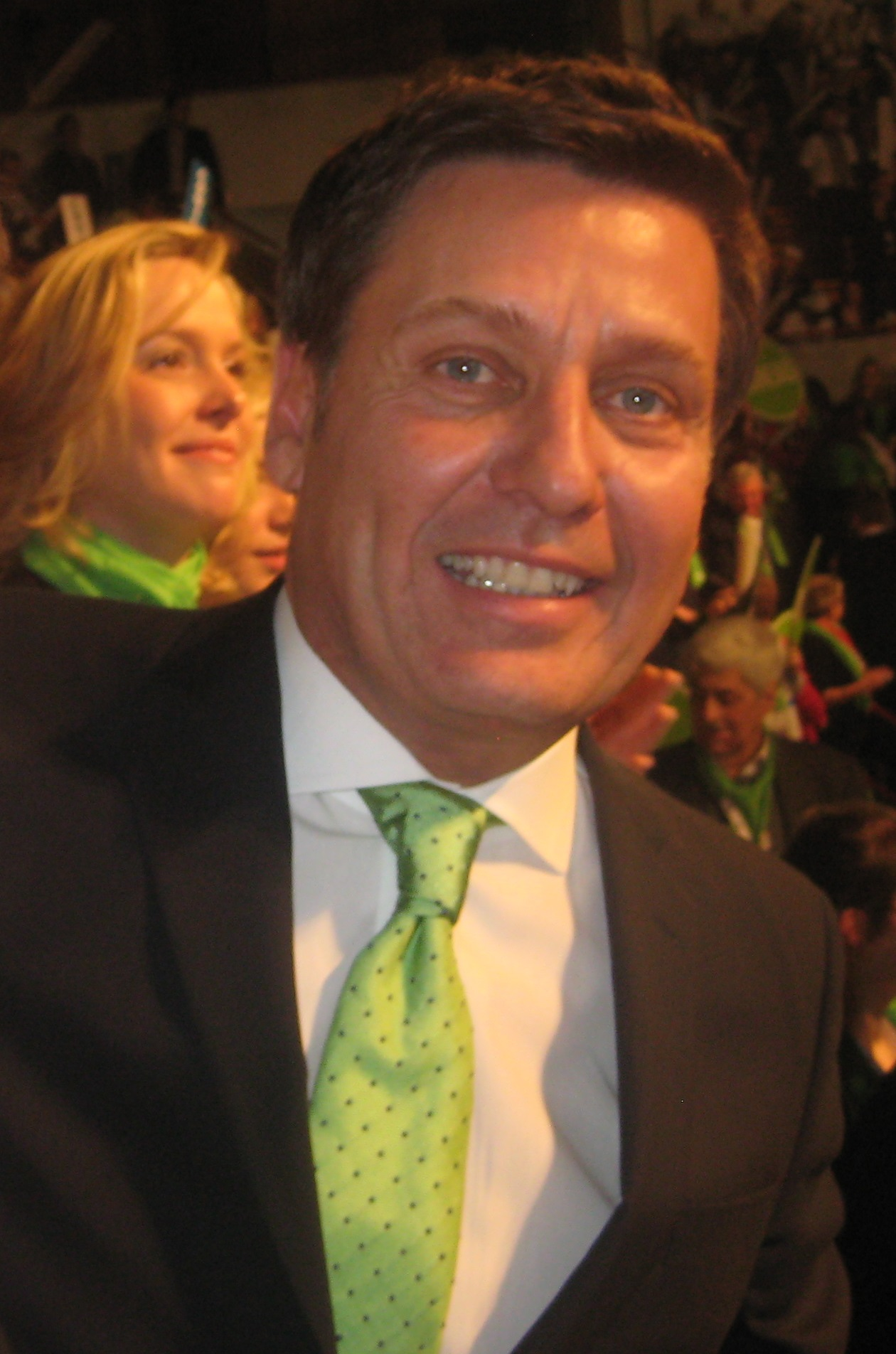
Pierre Moreau

Background

Member of National Assembly for Marguerite-D'Youville 2003–2007, Châteauguay since 2008. Former Minister of Transport.

Date campaign launched: October 1, 2012
Campaign website: web.archive.org/web/20121206031556/http://www.pierremoreau.ca/
Supporters

- MNAs: (13) Pierre Arcand, Julie Boulet, Marc Carrière, Francine Charbonneau, Maryse Gaudreault, Charlotte L'Écuyer, Norbert Morin, Gilles Ouimet, Robert Poëti, Filomena Rotiroti, Stéphanie Vallée, Karine Vallières, Dominique Vien
- Past MNAs: (1) Jean Cournoyer
- Other prominent individuals: Suzanne Marcil, wife of former Quebec premier Daniel Johnson, Jr.

=== Withdrawn candidates ===
==== Jean David ====
Background

Former Cirque du Soleil marketing vice-president. President of the party's youth wing from 1971 to 1972. Chair of the party's policy commission from 1999 to 2002, when he quit the party. David admitted at the beginning of his campaign he may not be able to meet the requirements to become an official candidate. He withdrew from the race two days before the deadline to submit his nomination papers, after failing to get the requisite 500 signatures in 50 ridings.

Date campaign launched: October 24, 2012
Date candidacy withdrawn: December 12, 2012
Campaign website: jeandavid.ca
Supporters

- MNAs:
- Other prominent individuals:

=== Declined ===
- Pierre Paradis, MNA for Brome-Missisquoi and former cabinet minister.

== Opinion polling ==
=== All Quebecers ===
Poll source	Date(s) administered	Raymond Bachand	Philippe Couillard	Pierre Moreau	Other
Léger Marketing; Sample size: 1,216	March 7–10, 2013	15%	30%	7%	Don't know (36%); Refused (12%)
Léger Marketing; Sample size: 1,024	February 5–6, 2013	13%	32%	10%	Don't know (38%); Refused (7%)
Léger Marketing; Sample size: 1,014	November 21–22, 2012	13%	31%	6%	Jean David (1%); Don't know (42%); Refused (7%)
Léger Marketing; Sample size: 1,003	October 15–16, 2012	14%	37%	10%	Don't know (32%); Refused (7%)
Léger Marketing; Sample size: 1,869	September 24–26, 2012	10%	27%	6%	Line Beauchamp (8%); Pierre Paradis (6%); None of these potential candidates (15%); Don't know (26%); Refused (2%)

=== Liberal supporters only ===
Poll source	Date(s) administered	Raymond Bachand	Philippe Couillard	Pierre Moreau	Other
Léger Marketing; Sample size: 293	March 7–10, 2013	19%	44%	10%	Don't know (24%); Refused (3%)
Léger Marketing; Sample size: 265	February 5–6, 2013	17%	43%	8%	Don't know (30%); Refused (2%)
Léger Marketing; Sample size: 230	November 21–22, 2012	14%	34%	7%	Jean David (0%); Don't know (42%); Refused (3%)
Léger Marketing; Sample size: 286	October 15–16, 2012	16%	48%	12%	Don't know (21%); Refused (3%)
Léger Marketing; Sample size: 482	September 24–26, 2012	13%	34%	7%	Line Beauchamp (7%); Pierre Paradis (6%); None of these potential candidates (5%); Don't know (27%); Refused (1%)

== Results ==
= Winner

First Ballot
Candidate Name	Votes	Percentage
Philippe Couillard	1,390	58.5%
Pierre Moreau	523	22.0%
Raymond Bachand	464	19.5%
Total votes cast	2,377	100.0%
