= Georges Anglade =

Haitian-Canadian geographer, author and politician (1944-2010)

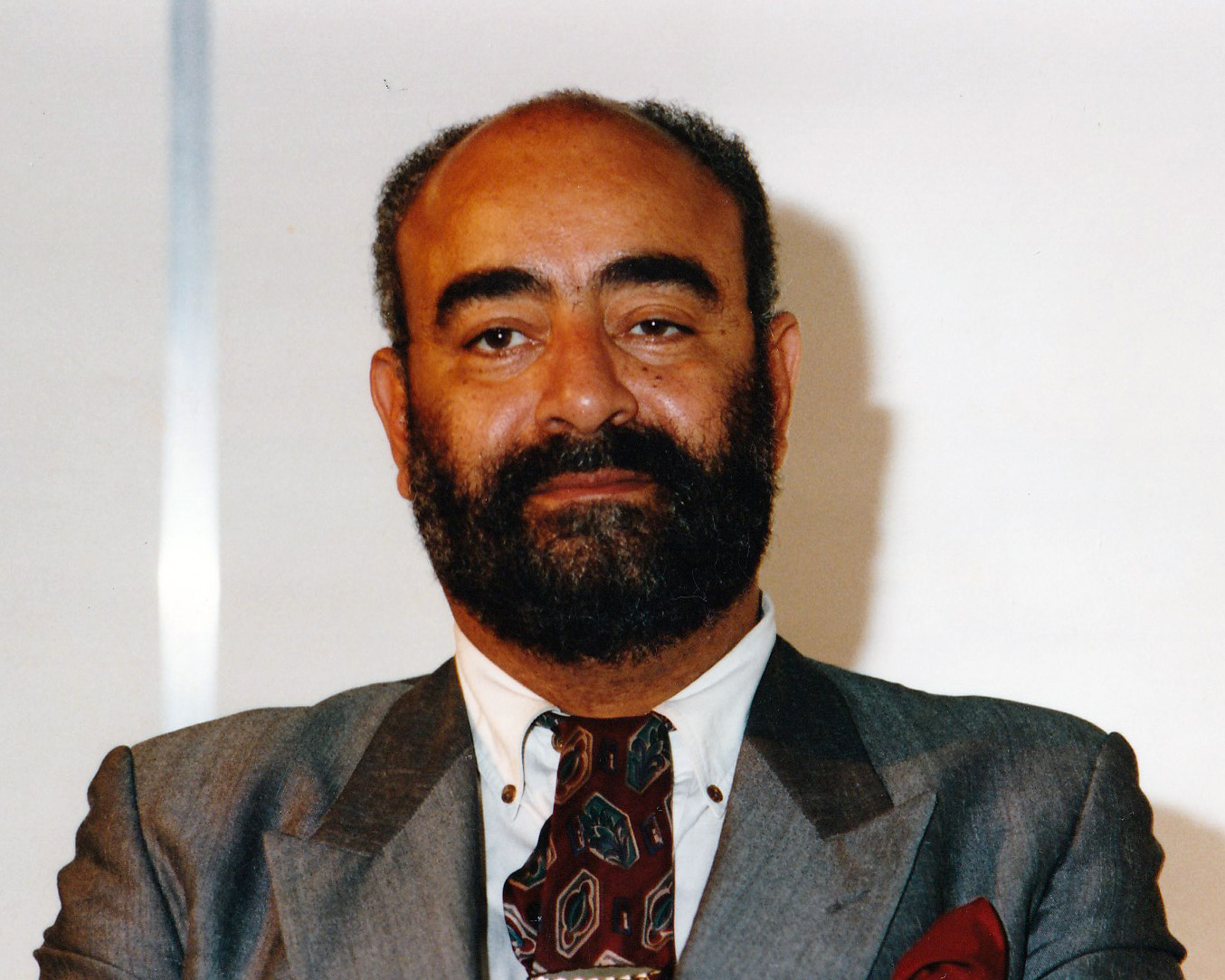

Minister of Public Works, Transportation and Communication of Haiti
- In office January 17, 1995 – November 7, 1995
- President: Jean-Bertrand Aristide
- Prime Minister: Smarck Michel
- Preceded by: Marc-Henri Rousseau François
- Succeeded by: Jacques Dorcéan

Personal details
- Born: July 18, 1944 Port-au-Prince, Haiti
- Died: January 12, 2010 (aged 65) Port-au-Prince, Haiti
- Spouse: Mireille Neptune
- Children: Dominique Anglade
- Profession: Geographer, educator, author

Georges Anglade (July 18, 1944 – January 12, 2010) was a Haitian–Canadian geographer, professor, writer and politician.

== Early life and education ==
Anglade was born in Port-au-Prince. In 1965, he received a law degree and a diploma in Social Sciences from the Faculty of Law from the École normale supérieure in Port-au-Prince. He studied at the University of Strasbourg from 1965 to 1969, where he obtained a degree of literature in 1967 and doctorate of geography in 1969. He came to Montreal in 1969 and was one of the founders of the Université du Québec à Montréal.

== Career ==
He was head of the UQAM department of geography from 1982 to 1984, served two terms as head of the graduate program, and was a professor of social geography until 2002.

Anglade was a strong opponent of the Duvalier régime in Haiti. He was imprisoned under François Duvalier in 1974. He was exiled from Haiti in 1974 and 1991. He spent much of his adult life in exile in Quebec. In the 1980s, he founded the Haitian Solidarity Movement (MAS) in Montreal and in 1990 he published La Chance qui passe, a manifesto calling for democracy in Haiti. In 1994, he chaired the Miami International Political Conference, which initiated the return to democracy in Haiti. In the mid-1990s, he served as advisor under the governments of Jean Bertrand Aristide and René Préval. He served as the Minister of Public Works of Haiti for 10 months in 1995.

Anglade was active member of PEN International. He served on the board of PEN Quebec for 11 years. He founded the PEN Centre Haiti, and served as president until his death in 2010. His vision was realized in 2012, with the opening of the Maison Georges Anglade PEN Centre located in Thomassin, Haiti.

== Death ==
Anglade was killed alongside his wife, Mireille Neptune Anglade (also Haitian), a women's rights activist, in the 2010 Haiti earthquake. They were at the home of prominent economist Phillipe Rouzier and his wife Marilyse, when the house collapsed. Rouzier was also killed. Mireille and George Anglade's house, located in the same ancestral domain in Port-au-Prince, also collapsed.

== Family ==
His daughter Dominique Anglade was a member of the National Assembly of Quebec and was deputy premier of the province from October 2017 to October 2018. She became the leader of the Quebec Liberal Party and leader of the Official Opposition of Quebec in May 2020, until her retirement from politics in November 2022 following the results of the Quebec 2022 general election.

== Bibliography ==
=== Fiction ===
- Anglade, Georges (1999). Les blancs de mémoire : lodyans. [Montréal]: Boréal. ISBN 978-2-89052-969-4.
- ———————— (2002). Ce pays qui m'habite : lodyans. Outremont, Québec: Lanctôt. ISBN 978-2-89485-240-8.
- ———————— (2004). Leurs jupons dépassent : lodyans. Outremont, Québec: Lanctôt. ISBN 978-2-89485-265-1.
- ———————— (2004). Et si Haïti déclarait la guerre aux USA?. Montréal: Ecosociété. ISBN 978-2-923165-02-8.
- ———————— (2006). Rire haïtien : les lodyans de Georges Anglade = Haitian laughter : a mosaic of ninety miniatures in French and English (Éd. bilingue. ed.). Coconut Creek, FL: Educa Vision. ISBN 978-1-58432-359-4.

=== Non-fiction ===
- ———————— (1974). L'espace haïtien. Montréal: Presses de l'Université du Québec. ISBN 0-7770-0115-2.
- ———————— (1977). Mon pays d'Haïti. Montréal / Port-au-Prince: Presses de l'Université du Québec / Éd. de l'Action sociale. ISBN 0-7770-0197-7.
- ———————— (1982). Espace et liberté en Haïti. Montréal: ERCE & CRC. ISBN 2-920418-01-7.
- ———————— (1982). Atlas critique d'Haïti. Montréal: Université du Québec à Montréal. ISBN 2-920418-00-9.
- ———————— (1990). Cartes sur table. Etudes et recherches critiques d'espace. Port-au-Prince, Haïti: Editions Henri Deschamps. ISBN 2-920418-06-8.
- ———————— (1990). La chance qui passe. Port-au-Prince: Opération Lavalas. OCLC 33333441.
- ———————— (2008). Chronique d'une espérance. Port-au-Prince: [s. n.] ISBN 978-99935-94-04-8.
