= Quebec Liberal Party leadership elections =

Canadian provincial party elections

Note: Before 1938, the leaders of the Quebec Liberal Party were chosen by the party caucus.

== 1938 leadership convention ==
(Held June 11, 1938)

- Adélard Godbout acclaimed

Télesphore-Damien Bouchard and Édouard Lacroix withdrew before balloting.

== 1950 leadership convention ==
(Held May 20, 1950)

- Georges-Émile Lapalme acclaimed

George Carlyle Marler declined nomination; Horace Phillipon, Jean-Marie Nadeau withdrew before balloting.

== 1958 leadership convention ==
(Held May 31, 1958)

- Jean Lesage 630 (72.2%)
- Paul Gérin-Lajoie 145 (16.6%)
- René Hamel 97 (11.1%)
- Aimé Fauteux 1 (0.1%)

== 1970 leadership convention ==
(Held January 17, 1970)

- Robert Bourassa 843 (53.2%)
- Claude Wagner 455 (28.7%)
- Pierre Laporte 288 (18.1%)

== 1978 leadership convention ==
(Held April 15, 1978)

- Claude Ryan 1,748 (68.4%)
- Raymond Garneau 807 (31.6%)

== 1983 leadership convention ==
(Held October 15, 1983)

- Robert Bourassa 2,138 (75.4%)
- Pierre Paradis 353 (12.5%)
- Daniel Johnson, Jr. 343 (12.1%)

== 1993 leadership convention ==
(Held December 14, 1993)

- Daniel Johnson Jr. acclaimed

== 1998 leadership convention ==
(Held April 30, 1998)

- Jean Charest acclaimed

== 2013 leadership convention ==
(Held March 17, 2013)

- Philippe Couillard 1,390 (58.5%)
- Pierre Moreau 523 (22.0%)
- Raymond Bachand 464 (19.5%)

== 2020 leadership election ==
Couillard resigned as Liberal leader on October 4, 2018, following his government's defeat in the 2018 provincial election and was initially supposed to take place on May 31, 2020. Following the COVID-19 pandemic, the leadership election was initially postponed indefinitely. On May 11, 2020, after candidate Alexandre Cusson withdrew from the race, Dominique Anglade was chosen as leader by acclamation.

- Dominique Anglade acclaimed

== 2025 leadership election ==
(Held June 9–14, 2025)

Candidate	Round 1		Runoff	
Candidate	Points	%	Points	%
Pablo Rodriguez	145,878	39	195,602	52.3
Charles Milliard	107,345	28.7	178,398	47.7
Karl Blackburn	103,265	27.6	Eliminated	
Marc Bélanger	14,659	3.9	Eliminated	
Mario Roy	2,853	0.8	Eliminated	
Total	374,000	100.00	374,000	100.00

== 2026 leadership election ==
Rodriguez resigned as leader on December 17, 2025, after a political scandal and crisis. Milliard was acclaimed as leader as no other candidates qualified to be on the ballot; a leadership convention was to be held on March 14, 2026.

(Held February 13, 2026)

- Charles Milliard acclaimed
