= Dominique Anglade =

Canadian politician (born 1974)

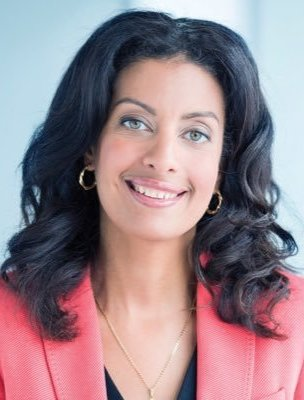

Leader of the Opposition of Quebec
- In office May 11, 2020 – November 10, 2022
- Preceded by: Pierre Arcand
- Succeeded by: Marc Tanguay

Leader of the Quebec Liberal Party
- In office May 11, 2020 – November 10, 2022
- President: Linda Caron
- Preceded by: Pierre Arcand (interim)
- Succeeded by: Marc Tanguay (interim)

Deputy Premier of Quebec
- In office October 11, 2017 – October 18, 2018
- Premier: Philippe Couillard
- Preceded by: Lise Thériault
- Succeeded by: Geneviève Guilbault

Minister of Economic Development, Innovation and Export Trade
- In office January 28, 2016 – October 18, 2018
- Premier: Philippe Couillard
- Preceded by: Jacques Daoust
- Succeeded by: Pierre Fitzgibbon

President of the Coalition Avenir Québec
- In office January 23, 2012 – November 12, 2013
- Leader: François Legault
- Preceded by: Position established
- Succeeded by: Maud Cohen
Parliamentary constituencies
Member of the National Assembly of Quebec for Saint-Henri–Sainte-Anne
In office November 9, 2015 – December 1, 2022
Preceded by	Marguerite Blais
Succeeded by	Guillaume Cliche-Rivard

Personal details
- Born: January 31, 1974 (age 52) Montreal, Quebec, Canada
- Party: Quebec Liberal; Liberal
- Other political affiliations: Coalition Avenir Québec (2012–2015)
- Domestic partner: Helge Seetzen
- Children: 3
- Profession: Politician

Dominique Anglade (French pronunciation: [dɔminik ɑ̃ɡlad]; born January 31, 1974) is a Canadian engineer, businesswoman and former politician who served as the leader of the Quebec Liberal Party and leader of the Opposition of Quebec from May 11, 2020 to December 1, 2022. She has served as a member of the National Assembly of Quebec from 2015 to 2022, representing Saint-Henri–Sainte-Anne. She is the first woman to lead the Quebec Liberal Party, the first black woman to lead a provincial party in Canada (at the federal level, Vivian Barbot was interim leader of the Bloc Québécois in 2011), and the first person of Haitian descent to be a cabinet minister in Canada. She is the daughter of the academic Georges Anglade. She was also the first woman CEO of Montréal International.

== Early life and education ==
Anglade was born in Montreal to Georges and Mireille Neptune Anglade. Georges Anglade was a founder of the Université du Québec and a longtime geography professor there, as well as a special advisor to Haitian presidents Jean-Bertrand Aristide and René Préval. Mireille Neptune Anglade completed a PhD in economics and worked for NATO monitoring women's rights in Haiti.

Anglade spent much of her youth in Haiti, but returned to Canada to attend university. She holds an MBA from HEC Montréal and a Bachelor of Industrial Engineering from the École Polytechnique de Montréal. Before she entered politics, Anglade worked for the consulting firm McKinsey & Company in Montreal.

== Political career ==
=== Coalition Avenir Québec ===
Anglade was formerly associated with the Coalition Avenir Québec. She ran as the CAQ candidate in Fabre in the 2012 election, losing to Liberal Gilles Ouimet. She served as the president of the CAQ from 2012 to 2013. She left that position to become CEO of Montréal International.

=== Quebec Liberal Party ===
In 2015, Anglade joined the Quebec Liberal Party, and stood as their candidate in a by-election for Saint-Henri–Sainte-Anne. She explained her political shift by citing objections to the CAQ's positions on ethnic identity and immigration. She was elected on November 9.

Anglade served in the cabinet of Philippe Couillard as the minister of economic development, innovation and export trade from 2016 to 2018. This made Anglade the first person of Haitian descent, and the second black woman, to exercise a ministerial function in Quebec. In 2017, Anglade was named Deputy Premier of Quebec, holding that office until the Liberal government's defeat in the 2018 election.

On June 27, 2019, following the departure of Philippe Couillard as party leader, Anglade announced her candidacy for the 2020 Quebec Liberal Party leadership election. She ran on a platform of returning the party to the Quebec nationalism within a framework of federalism associated with previous leaders Robert Bourassa and Jean Lesage. She also emphasized expanding the support base of the PLQ beyond Montreal, since the 2018 defeat of the Liberal Party was largely attributed to an overwhelming rejection by voters who lived outside of Montreal. To that end, she campaigned on a Charter of Regions that made dozens of specific commitments to communities across the province.

Anglade was named party leader on May 11, 2020, after her opponent, Alexandre Cusson, dropped out of the race. This made her the first woman to lead the Quebec Liberal Party, and the first Black woman to lead a provincial party in Quebec.

Anglade led the Liberals into the 2022 Quebec general election, The Liberals dropped to their lowest raw seat count since 1956, their lowest percentage of seats won since 1948 and their lowest share of the popular vote in their history.

Anglade announced her resignation as leader of the Quebec Liberal Party on November 7, 2022. She left the National Assembly on December 1. The provincial by-election to replace her was held on March 13, 2023, with Québec solidaire's Guillaume Cliche-Rivard winning the election.

She is the first non-interim Liberal leader who did not become premier since Claude Ryan.

== Other activities ==
Anglade has served on the Board of Directors of several organizations including the Chamber of Commerce of Metropolitan Montreal, the United Way of Canada, and the Centre hospitalier universitaire Sainte-Justine.

Anglade's mother, father, uncle, and cousin were killed in the 2010 Haiti Earthquake. Following the earthquake, Anglade co-founded the organisation Kanpe (which is Haitian Creole for "stand up"), a charity to assist rural Haitians with rebuilding after the disaster.

== Awards and recognition ==
- Hommage Award, Ordre des ingénieurs du Québec (2011)
- Toussaint-Louverture Prize, Young Haitian Chamber of Commerce (2013)
- Laureate Prix Mérite (2017), L'Association des diplômés de Polytechnique (ADP)
- Young Global leader (2014), the World Economic Forum. This distinction is awarded each year to the new generation of 40-and-under leaders from around the world who have been recognized for their professional achievements and their commitment to society. Ms. Anglade is the only Quebecker to have received this honour in 2014, among 214 honourees from 66 countries.

== Electoral record ==
2022 Quebec general election: Saint-Henri-Sainte-Anne
Party	Candidate	Votes	%	±%
Liberal	Dominique Anglade	11,728	36.15	-1.91
Québec solidaire	Guillaume Cliche-Rivard	8,992	27.72	+3.88
Coalition Avenir Québec	Nicolas Huard-Isabelle	5,751	17.73	-0.95
Parti Québécois	Julie Daubois	2,683	8.27	-3.20
Conservative	Mischa White	2,063	6.36	+5.14
Green	Jean-Pierre Duford	620	1.91	-1.33
Bloc Montreal	Janusz Kaczorowski	530	1.63	–
Démocratie directe	Esther Gaudreault	73	0.23	–
Total valid votes		32,440	98.91	–
Total rejected ballots		357	1.09	-0.79
Turnout		32,797	57.82	+1.21
Electors on the lists		56,721	–	–
Liberal hold		Swing		-2.90
Source(s) "2022 provincial general election results". Élections Québec.

2018 Quebec general election: Saint-Henri-Sainte-Anne
Party	Candidate	Votes	%	±%
Liberal	Dominique Anglade	11,837	38.06	-13.58
Québec solidaire	Benoit Racette	7,413	23.83	+12.89
Coalition Avenir Québec	Sylvie Hamel	5,809	18.68	+7.50
Parti Québécois	Dieudonné Ella Oyono	3,568	11.47	-11.01
Green	Jean-Pierre Duford	1,009	3.24	+1.36
New Democratic	Steven Scott	690	2.22	
Conservative	Caroline Orchard	380	1.22	
Bloc Pot	Félix Gagnon-Paquin	202	0.65	
CINQ	Christopher Young	103	0.33	
Marxist–Leninist	Linda Sullivan	91	0.29	
Total valid votes		31,102	98.12	
Total rejected ballots		597	1.88	
Turnout		31,699	56.61	
Eligible voters		55,994		
Liberal hold		Swing		-13.23
Source(s) "Rapport des résultats officiels du scrutin". Élections Québec.

^ Change calculated from the redistributed 2014 results.

Quebec provincial by-election, 9 November 2015: Saint-Henri–Sainte-Anne
Party	Candidate	Votes	%	±%
Liberal	Dominique Anglade	5,325	38.64	-13.88
Parti Québécois	Gabrielle Lemieux	4,119	29.89	+7.99
Québec solidaire	Marie-Ève Rancourt	2,856	20.73	+10.04
Coalition Avenir Québec	Louis-Philippe Boulanger	717	5.20	-5.99
Green	Jiab Zou	507	3.68	+1.82
Option nationale	Luc Lefebvre	146	1.06	+0.46
Conservative	Christian Hébert	110	0.80	–
Total valid votes		13,780	100.00	–
Total rejected ballots		115	0.83	-0.61
Turnout		13,895	23.89	-44.40
Eligible voters		58,171		
Liberal hold		Swing		-10.93

2012 Quebec general election: Fabre
Party	Candidate	Votes	%	±%
Liberal	Gilles Ouimet	13,305	37.50	-10.87
Parti Québécois	François-Gycelain Rocque	9,924	27.97	-6.59
Coalition Avenir Québec	Dominique Anglade	9,852	27.77	+16.46
Québec solidaire	Wilfried Cordeau	1,260	3.55	+0.78
Green	Jean-François Lepage	547	1.54	-1.43
Option nationale	Bruno Forget	388	1.09	
Independent	Philippe Mayrand	207	0.58	
Total valid votes		35,483	98.97	–
Total rejected ballots		371	1.03	–
Turnout		35,854	75.96	
Electors on the lists		47,199	–	–
Liberal hold		Swing		-2.14
