= Sophie Brochu =

Canadian economist and businesswoman

President and CEO of Hydro-Québec
- In office April 6, 2020 – April 11, 2023
- Preceded by: Eric Martel
- Succeeded by: Michael Sabia

President of Énergir
- In office 2007 – December 30, 2019

Personal details
- Born: 1963 (age 62–63) Lévis, Quebec, Canada
- Education: Université Laval

Sophie Brochu (born 1963) is a Canadian economist and manager from Quebec who worked for 22 years at Gaz Métro/Énergir. She has over 30 years of experience in energy, government relations, human resources and sustainability. She is the first woman to have held the position of President and CEO of Hydro-Québec between 2020 and 2023.

She has been named as a potential candidate in the 2026 Quebec Liberal Party leadership election.

== Biography ==
Sophie Brochu was born in the city of Lévis in 1963. After graduating from Collège de Lévis, where she performed on stage under the supervision of Denis Bernard and Robert Lepage, Brochu was admitted to the Conservatoire d'art dramatique de Québec.

Brochu graduated in economics from Laval University, and she began her career in 1987 at the Société québécoise d'initiatives pétroles (SOQUIP), a state-owned company of the Government of Quebec. In 1997, she joined Gaz Métro as Vice President of Business Development. In 2005, Sophie Brochu was appointed Executive Vice President. Between 2007 and 2019, she served as president and CEO of Gaz Métro. When she left Gaz Métro, which became Énergir in 2017, she had worked there for 22 years.

She was chosen to interview Hillary Clinton (in 2014) and Barack Obama (in 2017) at conferences held in Montreal. In April 2020, she was appointed president of Hydro-Québec. In January 2023, she announced that she would be leaving the company's leadership in April after 3 years, the reason for which was not specified. In 2023, she became a director of the Quebec companies CGI and CAE. In June 2024, she was elected to the board of directors of the French multinational Saint-Gobain.

=== Social impact ===
Brochu is actively involved with Centraide of Greater Montreal, and also chairs the board of directors of the Fondation Forces Avenir, a student support organization in the community. She is also a co-founder of La ruelle de l'avenir, an organization that fights against school dropout in the Centre-Sud and Hochelaga-Maisonneuve neighbourhoods. Sophie Brochu participates in the Laval University Foundation's Great Campaign (campaign leadership).

=== Politics ===
In January 2026, Brochu was named as a potential candidate in the 2026 Quebec Liberal Party leadership election. She previously declined to be a candidate in the 2025 leadership election.

== Distinctions ==
- 2015 - Member of the Order of Canada
- 2021 - Officer of the National Order of Quebec
