= Québec Identitaire =

Anti-Islam group in Quebec, Canada

Québec Identitaire (English: Quebec Identity) is a Quebec based protest group espousing that people that follow Islam should leave Canada. In November 2014, the group vandalized several mosques in Quebec and left paper leaflets with a written message in Quebec French "Islam hors de chez moi" (English: "Islam out of my country").

These incidents came shortly after two separate attacks by lone wolf terrorists sympathetic to the group Islamic State of Iraq and the Levant. The attacks, the 2014 Saint-Jean-sur-Richelieu ramming attack and the 2014 shootings at Parliament Hill, Ottawa, led to the deaths of two Canadian Armed Forces personnel.

== Response ==
On November 12, 2014, Quebec Liberal Party Immigration Minister Kathleen Weil stated, "It's important for us as a government to condemn these acts...I had the opportunity to say to some international news reporters that it really doesn't reflect Quebec society. It reflects terribly on us from the outside. We are a tolerant society, inclusive and open to diversity."

== See also ==
- Bloc identitaire - Original chapter of Identitaire.
- Génération Identitaire - France chapter of Identitaire.
- Counterjihad
- Criticism of Islam
- Islamophobia in Canada
- Quebec nationalism
- Religious intolerance
