= Montréal International =

Montréal International (MI) is an economic development agency that encourages investment in Greater Montreal. MI claims that it helped attract $2.642 billion in foreign direct investments to Greater Montréal in 2019.

== Foreign direct investments ==
In 2013, Montréal International and its partners helped 39 foreign subsidiaries set up or expand in Greater Montréal. This prospecting and support resulted in foreign direct investments of $1.28 billion – 86% more than in 2012 – and in 2,729 jobs created or maintained. European companies accounted for 83% of the investments facilitated by MI — a more than 25-point increase over 2012. Sweden and Germany in particular, saw their share rise sharply.

== International organizations ==
In addition to playing an active part in keeping the International Civil Aviation Organization (ICAO) in Montréal – when Qatar offered to move ICAO headquarters to Doha – Montréal International played a strategic role in 2013 in the expansion of Airports Council International (ACI), which represents more than 1,861 airports in 177 countries. MI also led 63 foreign prospecting missions and organized 36 targeted activities to support the growth of international organizations already established in Montréal.

In 2013, thirty companies took part in three recruiting missions in the US and Europe, and 186 foreign workers were hired. Montréal International is also one of the few investment promotion agencies in the world that helps organizations manage international mobility.

In addition to promoting the economic strengths of the Québec metropolis, Montréal International identifies the region's primary attractiveness issues and makes recommendations to the various levels of government.

== Activities ==
Montréal International offers a series of services:

- Advice related to strategy and day-to-day operations.
- Financial and tax programs
- International mobility
- Industry expertise
- Economic data
- Network access
