= List of leaders of the opposition of Quebec =

This is a list of the leaders of the opposition party of Quebec, Canada since Confederation (1867).

Note that the leader of the opposition is not always the leader of the political party with the second-largest number of seats, in cases where the leader of that party does not have a seat.

There was no leader of the official opposition until March 1869, when the government's second budget was introduced.

== Leaders of the Official Opposition ==
Portrait	Name	Electoral district (Region)	Took office	Left office	Party
	Henri-Gustave Joly de Lotbinière	Lotbinière (Chaudière-Appalaches)	March 1869	June 1878	Liberal
	Joseph-Adolphe Chapleau	Terrebonne (Lanaudière)	June 1878	31 October 1879	Conservative
	Henri-Gustave Joly de Lotbinière	Lotbinière (Chaudière-Appalaches)	31 October 1879	1883	Liberal
	Honoré Mercier	Saint-Hyacinthe (Montérégie)	1883	1887	Liberal
	Louis-Olivier Taillon	Montcalm (Lanaudière)	1887	17 June 1890	Conservative
	Jean Blanchet (Note: Served as opposition leader after Louis-Olivier Taillon lost his seat in 1890.)	Beauce (Chaudière-Appalaches)	17 June 1890	1891	Conservative
	Félix-Gabriel Marchand	Saint-Jean (Montérégie)	1892	11 May 1897	Liberal
	Edmund James Flynn	Gaspé (Gaspésie—Îles-de-la-Madeleine) until 1900; Nicolet (Centre-du-Québec) after 1900	24 May 1897	25 November 1904	Conservative
	Pierre-Évariste Leblanc	Laval (Laval)	1905	8 June 1908	Conservative
	Joseph-Mathias Tellier (Note: Served as opposition leader after Pierre-Évariste Leblanc lost his seat in 1908 and subsequently resigned.)	Joliette (Lanaudière)	1908/1909	1915	Conservative
	Philémon Cousineau	Jacques-Cartier (Montreal)	1915	1916	Conservative
	Arthur Sauvé (Note: Served as opposition leader after Philémon Cousineau lost his seat in 1916 and subsequently resigned.)	Deux-Montagnes (Laurentides)	1916	1929	Conservative
	Camillien Houde	Montréal-Sainte-Marie (Montreal)	1929	1931	Conservative
	Charles Ernest Gault (Note: Served as opposition leader after Camillien Houde lost his seat in 1931. Concurrently served as acting party leader after Houde resigned. Continued serving until Maurice Duplessis was elected leader.)	Montréal-Saint-Georges (Montreal)	1931	7 November 1932	Conservative
	Maurice Duplessis	Trois-Rivières (Mauricie)	7 November 1932	1936	Conservative
	Télesphore-Damien Bouchard (Note: Served as opposition leader as party leader Adélard Godbout lost his seat in 1936.)	Saint-Hyacinthe (Montérégie)	1936	1939	Liberal
	Maurice Duplessis	Trois-Rivières (Mauricie)	1939	1944	Union Nationale
	Adélard Godbout	L'Islet (Chaudière-Appalaches)	1944	1948	Liberal
	George Carlyle Marler (Note: Served as opposition leader after party leader Adélard Godbout lost his seat in 1948. Georges-Émile Lapalme became party leader in 1950, but Marler remained as opposition leader as Lapalme didn't have a seat in legislature. Continued serving until Lapalme won a seat in a by-election.)	Westmount-Saint-Georges (Montreal)	1948	1953	Liberal
	Georges-Émile Lapalme (Note: Jean Lesage became party leader in 1958, but Lapalme remained as opposition leader as Lesage didn't have a seat in legislature.)	Montréal-Outremont (Montreal)	1953	1960	Liberal
	Yves Prévost (Note: Concurrently served as acting party leader following the resignation of Antonio Barrette.)	Montmorency (Québec)	1960	1961	Union Nationale
	Antonio Talbot (Note: Concurrently served as acting party leader following the resignation of Yves Prévost.)	Chicoutimi (Saguenay–Lac-Saint-Jean)	1961	1961	Union Nationale
	Daniel Johnson Sr.	Bagot (Montérégie)	1961	5 October 1966	Union Nationale
	Jean Lesage	Louis-Hébert (Québec)	5 October 1966	January 1970	Liberal
	Robert Bourassa	Mercier (Montreal)	January 1970	29 April 1970	Liberal
	Jean-Jacques Bertrand	Missisquoi (Eastern Townships)	29 April 1970	1971	Union Nationale (Note: Known as Unité Québec from 25 October 1971 to 14 January 1973.)
	Gabriel Loubier	Bellechasse (Chaudière-Appalaches)	1971	29 October 1973	Union Nationale
	Jacques-Yvan Morin (Note: Served as opposition leader as party leader René Lévesque failed to win a seat in 1973.)	Sauvé (Montreal)	29 October 1973	15 November 1976	Parti Québécois
	Gérard D. Levesque (Note: Concurrently served as acting party leader after Robert Bourassa lost his seat in 1976. Continued serving until Claude Ryan, who became party leader in 1978, won a seat in a by-election.)	Bonaventure (Gaspésie—Îles-de-la-Madeleine)	15 November 1976	1979	Liberal
	Claude Ryan	Argenteuil (Laurentides)	1979	1982	Liberal
	Gérard D. Levesque (Note: Concurrently served as acting party leader after Claude Ryan resigned. Continued serving as Robert Bourassa, who became party leader in 1983, did not have a seat in legislature.)	Bonaventure (Gaspésie—Îles-de-la-Madeleine)	1982	12 December 1985	Liberal
	Pierre-Marc Johnson	Anjou (Montreal)	12 December 1985	10 November 1987	Parti Québécois
	Guy Chevrette (Note: Concurrently served as acting party leader after Pierre Marc Johnson resigned. Continued serving until Jacques Parizeau, who became party leader in 1988, won a seat in a by-election.)	Joliette (Lanaudière)	12 November 1987	9 August 1989	Parti Québécois
	Jacques Parizeau	L'Assomption (Lanaudière)	9 August 1989	26 September 1994	Parti Québécois
	Daniel Johnson Jr.	Vaudreuil (Montérégie)	26 September 1994	12 May 1998	Liberal
	Monique Gagnon-Tremblay (Note: Concurrently served as acting party leader after Daniel Johnson Jr. resigned. Continued serving until Jean Charest, who became party leader in 1998, won a seat in a by-election.)	Saint-François (Eastern Townships)	2 March 1998	30 November 1998	Liberal
	Jean Charest	Sherbrooke (Eastern Townships)	30 November 1998	29 April 2003	Liberal
	Bernard Landry	Verchères (Montérégie)	29 April 2003	6 June 2005	Parti Québécois
	Louise Harel (Note: Concurrently served as acting party leader after Bernard Landry resigned. Continued serving until André Boisclair, who became party leader in 2005, won a seat in a by-election.)	Hochelaga-Maisonneuve (Montreal)	6 June 2005	21 August 2006	Parti Québécois
	André Boisclair	Pointe-aux-Trembles (Montreal)	21 August 2006	26 May 2007	Parti Québécois
	Mario Dumont	Rivière-du-Loup (Bas-Saint-Laurent)	26 March 2007	5 November 2008	Action démocratique du Québec
	Pauline Marois	Charlevoix (Capitale-Nationale)	9 December 2008	19 September 2012	Parti Québécois
	Jean-Marc Fournier (Note: Concurrently served as acting party leader after Jean Charest lost his seat in 2012 and subsequently resigned. Continued serving until Philippe Couillard, who became party leader in March 2013, won a seat in a by-election.)	Saint-Laurent (Montreal)	19 September 2012	18 December 2013	Liberal
	Philippe Couillard	Outremont (Montreal)	18 December 2013	23 April 2014	Liberal
	Stéphane Bédard (Note: Concurrently served as acting party leader after Pauline Marois lost her seat in 2014 and subsequently resigned. Continued serving until Pierre Karl Péladeau was elected leader.)	Chicoutimi (Saguenay–Lac-Saint-Jean)	23 April 2014	15 May 2015	Parti Québécois
	Pierre Karl Péladeau	Saint-Jérôme (Laurentides)	15 May 2015	2 May 2016	Parti Québécois
	Sylvain Gaudreault (Note: Concurrently served as acting party leader after Pierre Karl Péladeau resigned. Continued serving until Jean-François Lisée was elected leader.)	Jonquière (Saguenay–Lac-Saint-Jean)	6 May 2016	7 October 2016	Parti Québécois
	Jean-François Lisée	Rosemont (Montréal)	7 October 2016	1 October 2018	Parti Québécois
	Pierre Arcand (Note: Concurrently served as acting party leader after Philippe Couillard resigned. Continued serving until Dominique Anglade was elected leader.)	Mont-Royal–Outremont (Montréal)	18 October 2018	11 May 2020	Liberal
	Dominique Anglade	Saint-Henri–Sainte-Anne (Montréal)	11 May 2020	10 November 2022	Liberal
	Marc Tanguay (Note: Concurrently served as acting party leader after Dominique Anglade resigned.)	LaFontaine (Montréal)	10 November 2022	19 June 2025	Liberal
	Marwah Rizqy (Note: Served as leader as party leader Pablo Rodriguez didn't have a seat in legislature.)	Saint-Laurent (Montréal)	19 June 2025	18 November 2025	Liberal
	André Fortin (Note: Served as opposition leader after Marwah Rizqy was removed by the party caucus.)	Pontiac (Outaouais)	18 November 2025	19 December 2025	Liberal
	Marc Tanguay (Note: Concurrently served as acting party leader after Pablo Rodriguez resigned.)	LaFontaine (Montréal)	19 December 2025	14 February 2026	Liberal
	André Fortin (Note: Served as opposition leader as party leader Charles Milliard didn't have a seat in legislature. Continued serving until Milliard won a seat in 2026.)	Pontiac (Outaouais)	14 February 2026	5 October 2026	Liberal
	Charles Milliard	Orford (Estrie)	5 October 2026	Incumbent	Liberal

== See also ==
- List of Quebec general elections
- Timeline of Quebec history
- National Assembly of Quebec
- List of Quebec premiers
- List of third party leaders (Quebec)
- History of Quebec
