= André Fortin (politician) =

Canadian politician

André Fortin MNA
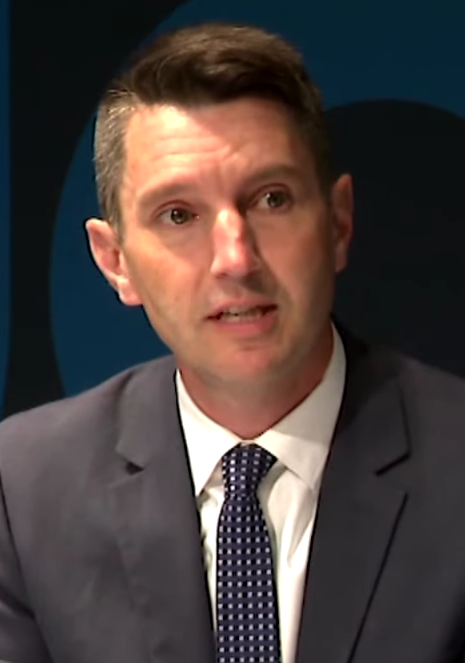
- Fortin in 2022

Opposition House Leader of Quebec
- Incumbent
- Assumed office October 18, 2026
- Leader: Charles Milliard
- Preceded by: Michelle Setlakwe

Leader of the Opposition of Quebec
- In office February 14, 2026 – October 5, 2026
- Preceded by: Marc Tanguay
- Succeeded by: Charles Milliard
- In office November 18, 2025 – December 19, 2025
- Preceded by: Marwah Rizqy
- Succeeded by: Marc Tanguay

Quebec Minister of Transport, Sustainable Mobility and Transport Electrification
- In office October 11, 2017 – October 18, 2018
- Premier: Philippe Couillard
- Preceded by: Laurent Lessard
- Succeeded by: François Bonnardel

Member of the National Assembly for Pontiac
- Incumbent
- Assumed office April 7, 2014
- Preceded by: Charlotte L'Écuyer

Personal details
- Born: 1981 (age 44–45) Quyon, Quebec
- Party: Quebec Liberal Party

André Fortin is a Canadian politician in Quebec, who was elected to the National Assembly of Quebec in the 2014 election. He represents the electoral district of Pontiac as a member of the Quebec Liberal Party.

Fortin has represented the provincial riding of Pontiac since April 7, 2014 and has been re-elected in every provincial election since then.

He currently resides in the Aylmer district of Gatineau.

== Early life and career ==
Andre Fortin was born on December 12, 1981 in Quyon, Quebec.

Fortin graduated from the Cégep du Vieux Montréal in 2000 with a Diploma of College Studies in Social Sciences. Fortin later graduated from the University of Ottawa with a Bachelor’s degree in Commerce in 2003. Fortin also has a Master’s degree in Business Administration which he also received from the University of Ottawa in 2011.

Prior to his election to the legislature, Fortin was a director of government relations for Canadian telecommunications company Telus as well as the Director of Public Affairs for the Brewers Association of Canada. He has also previously served as a political aide in the offices of Paul Martin, Jean Lapierre, Bill Graham and Ralph Goodale.

== Political career ==
Andre Fortin was first elected to the provincial legislature on April 7, 2014 in the riding of Pontiac winning with 75% of the vote.

During his first term in office, Fortin served as the Quebec Minister of Transport, Sustainable Development and Transport Electrification.

As of September 7, 2024, he serves as the opposition critic for Health; Agriculture, Fisheries and Food; Forests; Outaouais; and Abitibi-Témiscamingue. He became Leader of the Opposition of Quebec in November 2025 after Marwah Rizqy's removal. After Charles Milliard became party leader, Fortin was again appointed Leader of the Opposition.

== Electoral record ==
2026 Quebec general election: Pontiac
** Preliminary results — Not yet official **
| Party | Candidate | Votes | % | ±% |
|---|---|---|---|---|
| Liberal | André Fortin | 18,358 | 61.36 | |
| Conservative | Osmar Llanos Martinez | 3,373 | 11.27 | |
| Parti Québécois | Marcela Cazas | 3,236 | 10.82 | |
| Québec solidaire | Bianca Baldo | 2,862 | 9.57 | |
| Coalition Avenir Québec | Mariana Mefleh | 1,686 | 5.64 | |
| Canadian | William Twolan | 402 | 1.34 | |
| Total valid votes | | | | |
| Total rejected ballots | | | | |
| Turnout | | | 53.51 | |
| Electors on the lists | | | – | – |
| Liberal hold | | Swing | | |
Source: Élections Québec

2022 Quebec general election: Pontiac
| Party | Candidate | Votes | % | ±% |
|---|---|---|---|---|
| Liberal | André Fortin | 12,477 | 43.68 | -10.21 |
| Coalition Avenir Québec | Corinne Canuel-Jolicoeur | 7,056 | 24.70 | +4.29 |
| Conservative | Terrence Watters | 3,118 | 10.92 | +7.83 |
| Québec solidaire | Mike Owen Sebagenzi | 2,935 | 10.28 | -0.46 |
| Parti Québécois | Jolaine Paradis-Châteauneuf | 1,887 | 6.61 | +1.10 |
| Green | Pierre Cyr | 616 | 2.16 | -1.17 |
| Canadian | William Twolan | 475 | 1.66 | – |
| Total valid votes | | 28,564 | 99.36 | – |
| Total rejected ballots | | 185 | 0.64 | – |
| Turnout | | 28,749 | 53.50 | -0.03 |
| Electors on the lists | | 53,735 | | |

2018 Quebec general election: Pontiac
| Party | Candidate | Votes | % | ±% |
|---|---|---|---|---|
| Liberal | André Fortin | 14,869 | 53.89 | -21.87 |
| Coalition Avenir Québec | Olive Kamanyana | 5,632 | 20.41 | +11.48 |
| Québec solidaire | Julia Wilkie | 2,964 | 10.74 | +4.37 |
| Parti Québécois | Marie-Claire Nivolon | 1,520 | 5.51 | -3.04 |
| Green | Roger Fleury | 919 | 3.33 | |
| Conservative | Kenny Roy | 853 | 3.09 | |
| New Democratic | Samuel Gendron | 795 | 2.88 | |
| Marxist–Leninist | Louis Lang | 40 | 0.14 | -0.25 |
| Total valid votes | | 27,592 | 99.11 | |
| Total rejected ballots | | 249 | 0.89 | |
| Turnout | | 27,841 | 53.53 | |
| Eligible voters | | 52,009 | | |
| Liberal hold | | Swing | | -16.675 |
Source(s) "Rapport des résultats officiels du scrutin". Élections Québec.

2014 Quebec general election
| Party | Candidate | Votes | % | ±% |
|---|---|---|---|---|
| Liberal | André Fortin | 25,659 | 75.76 | +19.13 |
| Coalition Avenir Québec | Michel Mongeon | 3,026 | 8.93 | -9.13 |
| Parti Québécois | Maryse Vallières-Murray | 2,897 | 8,55 | -7.57 |
| Québec solidaire | Charmain Levy | 2,157 | 6,37 | +1.15 |
| Marxist–Leninist | Louis Lang | 131 | 0.39 | +0.19 |
