= Secrétariat du Conseil du trésor (Quebec) =

The Secrétariat du Conseil du trésor (French pronunciation: [səkʁetaʁja dy kɔ̃sɛj dy tʁezɔʁ], Treasury Board Secretariat) is a department of the government of Quebec. Its primary function is to assist the Treasury Board and its chair in the function of government and the management of resources.

The ministry is divided into four sub-secretariats: budget policies and programs, public service personnel, remuneration policies and intersectorial coordination of negotiations, and public procurement.

The secretariat is overseen by the president of the Treasury Board, who is a member of the Executive Council of Quebec. The current president is Alain Therrien.
