= Marc Tanguay =

Canadian politician (born 1973)

Marc Tanguay MNA
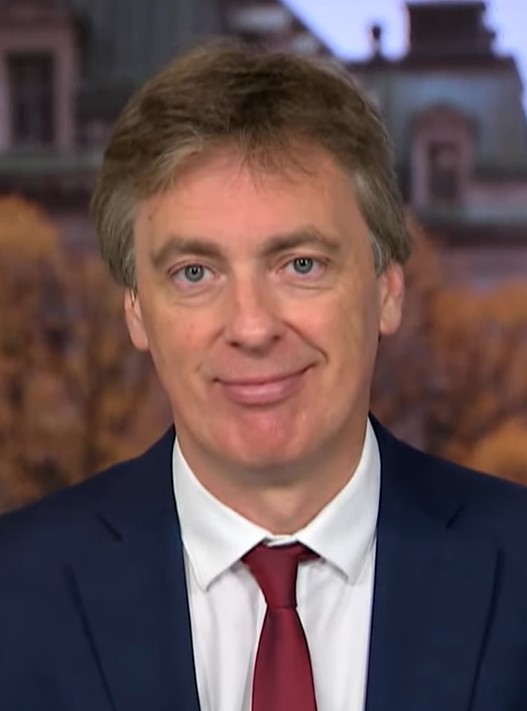
- Tanguay in October 2023

Leader of the Opposition of Quebec
- In office December 19, 2025 – February 14, 2026
- Preceded by: André Fortin
- Succeeded by: André Fortin
- In office November 10, 2022 – June 19, 2025
- Preceded by: Dominique Anglade
- Succeeded by: Marwah Rizqy

Interim Leader of the Quebec Liberal Party
- In office December 19, 2025 – February 13, 2026
- Preceded by: Pablo Rodriguez
- Succeeded by: Charles Milliard
- In office November 10, 2022 – June 14, 2025
- Preceded by: Dominique Anglade
- Succeeded by: Pablo Rodriguez

Member of the National Assembly of Quebec for LaFontaine
- Incumbent
- Assumed office June 11, 2012
- Preceded by: Tony Tomassi

Personal details
- Born: April 18, 1973 (age 53)
- Party: Quebec Liberal
- Other political affiliations: Parti Québécois (former)
- Profession: Lawyer

Marc Tanguay MNA (born April 18, 1973) is a Canadian politician and a member of the National Assembly of Quebec for the LaFontaine electoral district.

== Political career ==
On September 26, 2009, he was elected president of the Quebec Liberal Party. He is a lawyer by profession, and studied political science at Université Laval and law at Université de Montréal. In his youth, he was a member of the Parti Québécois.

He was elected in a by-election held on June 11, 2012, which was triggered by the resignation of Tony Tomassi on May 3, 2012. Prior to that, he was an unsuccessful Liberal candidate in the 2007 general election in Chambly electoral district, finishing third.

On November 10, 2022, he was named interim leader of the Quebec Liberal Party following the resignation of Dominique Anglade. He also serves as critic for Canadian Relations and Canadian Francophonie and Capitale-Nationale. On December 19, 2025, he was named as interim leader again after Pablo Rodriguez issued his resignation.

== Electoral record ==
2022 Quebec general election: LaFontaine
Party	Candidate	Votes	%	±%
Liberal	Marc Tanguay	13,398	51.67	-7.13
Coalition Avenir Québec	Loredana Bacchi	5,189	20.01	-1.9
Conservative	Yassir Madih	3,406	13.14	+11.38
Québec solidaire	Anne B-Godbout	2,301	8.87	+0.02
Parti Québécois	Shawn Vermette-Tassoni	1,322	5.10	-3.25
Green	Quinn Brunet	313	1.21	–
Total valid votes		25,929	98.58	–
Total rejected ballots		374	1.42	–
Turnout		26,303	62.33	
Electors on the lists		42,199		

2018 Quebec general election: LaFontaine
Party	Candidate	Votes	%	±%
Liberal	Marc Tanguay	14,491	58.8	-14.46
Coalition Avenir Québec	Loredana Bacchi	5,400	21.91	+11.14
Québec solidaire	David Touchette	2,181	8.85	+4.97
Parti Québécois	Claude Gauthier	2,057	8.35	-2.49
Conservative	Caleb Lavoie	434	1.76	–
Marxist–Leninist	Yves Le Seigle	80	0.32	+0.21
Total valid votes		24,643	98.04	
Total rejected ballots		493	1.96	
Turnout		25,136	59.03	-15.35
Eligible voters		42,584		
Liberal hold		Swing		-12.80
Source(s) "Rapport des résultats officiels du scrutin". Élections Québec.

2014 Quebec general election
Party	Candidate	Votes	%	±%
Liberal	Marc Tanguay	22,476	73.26	+14.12
Parti Québécois	Mathieu Pelletier	3,327	10.84	-5.87
Coalition Avenir Québec	Julie Di Battista Manseau	3,303	10.77	-5.06
Québec solidaire	Véronique Martineau	1,189	3.88	-0.44
Green	Benoit Drouin	233	0.76	-1.00
Option nationale	Geneviève Dao Phan	116	0.38	-0.49
Marxist–Leninist	Yves Le Seigle	34	0.11	–
Total valid votes		30,678	99.13	–
Total rejected ballots		269	0.87	–
Turnout		30,947	74.38	+3.07
Electors on the lists		41,609	–	–

2012 Quebec general election
Party	Candidate	Votes	%	±%
Liberal	Marc Tanguay	17,081	59.14	+5.22
Parti Québécois	Marc Boulerice	4,826	16.71	-0.30
Coalition Avenir Québec	Domenico Cavaliere	4,728	16.37	+0.68
Québec solidaire	Christine Filiatrault	1,248	4.32	-1.59
Green	Gaëtan Bérard	507	1.76	-1.26
Option nationale	Maxime St-Arnault	252	0.87	-0.71
Conservative	Patrice Raza	160	0.55	-0.71
Quebec Citizens' Union	Steven Hombrados	78	0.27	–
Total valid votes		28,880	98.88	–
Total rejected ballots		327	1.12	–
Turnout		29,207	71.31	+45.77
Electors on the lists		40,960	–	–

Quebec provincial by-election, June 11, 2012
Party	Candidate	Votes	%	±%
Liberal	Marc Tanguay	5,446	53.36	-16.40
Parti Québécois	Frédéric St-Jean	1,736	17.01	-2.10
Coalition Avenir Québec	Domenico Cavaliere	1,601	15.69	+9.19*
Québec solidaire	Sébastien Rivard	603	5.91	+4.00
Green	Gaëtan Bérard	308	3.02	+0.29
Option nationale	Paolo Zambito	161	1.58	–
Conservative	Patrice Raza	129	1.26	–
Independent	Marc-André Beauchesne	104	1.02	–
Parti nul	Renaud Blais	82	0.80	–
Équipe Autonomiste	Guy Boivin	36	0.45	–
Total valid votes		10,206	98.24	–
Total rejected ballots		183	1.76	–
Turnout		10,389	25.54	-25.62
Electors on the lists		40,679	–	–
