= Marwah Rizqy =

Canadian politician

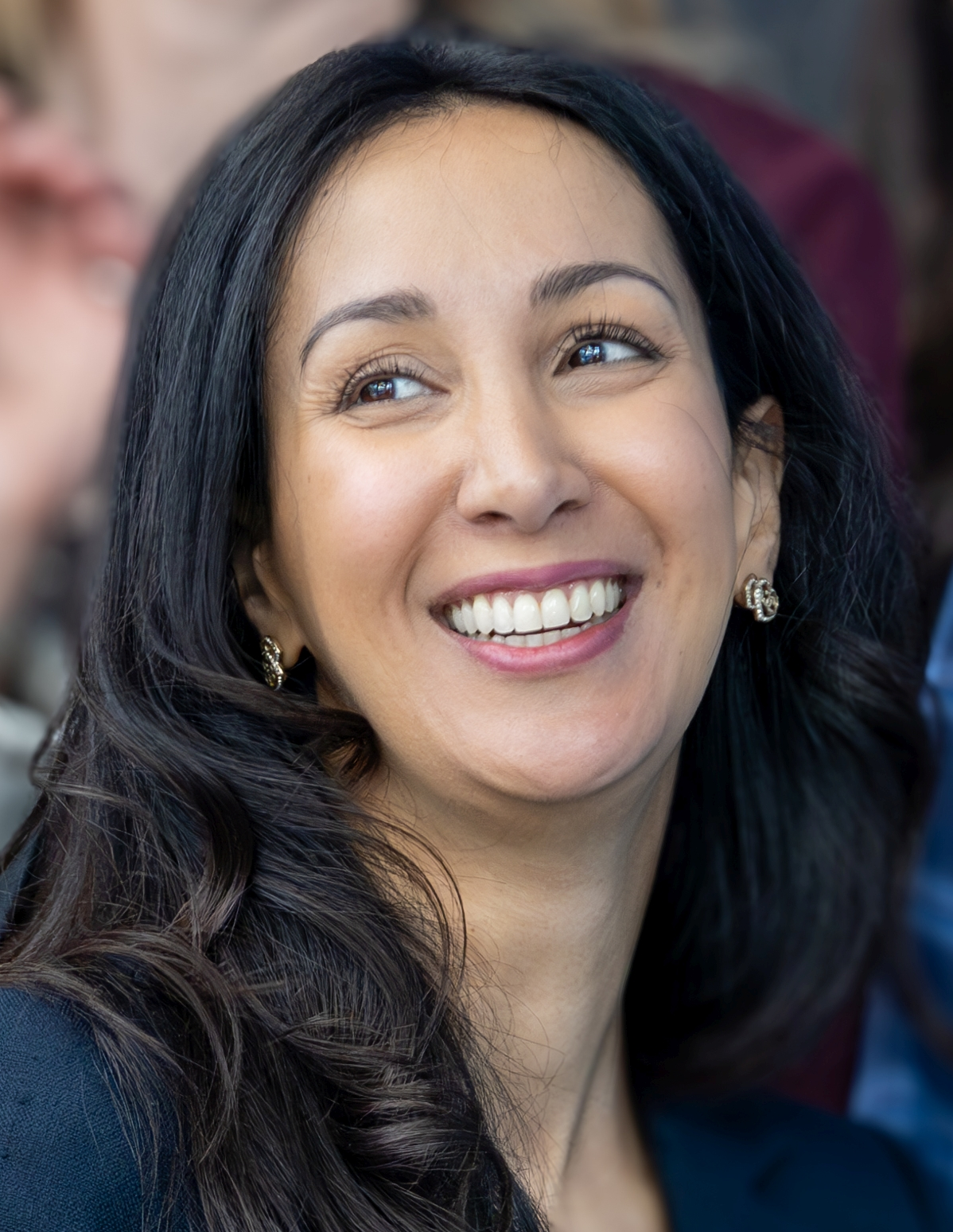
- Marwah Rizqy in 2025

Leader of the Opposition of Quebec
- In office June 19, 2025 – November 18, 2025
- Preceded by: Marc Tanguay
- Succeeded by: André Fortin

Member of the National Assembly of Quebec for Saint-Laurent
- In office October 1, 2018 – August 27, 2026
- Preceded by: Jean-Marc Fournier
- Succeeded by: Valérie Assouline

Personal details
- Born: May 17, 1985 (age 41) Montreal, Quebec, Canada
- Party: Independent (since 2025); Quebec Liberal Party (until 2025)
- Spouse: Greg Kelley (m. 2021)
- Children: 2

Marwah Rizqy (born May 17, 1985) is a Canadian politician, who was elected to the National Assembly of Quebec in the 2018 provincial election. She represented the electoral district of Saint-Laurent until 2026. She was elected as a member of the Quebec Liberal Party.

== Career ==
Prior to Rizqy's election, she was a professor of tax law at the University of Sherbrooke.

She previously ran for the Liberal Party of Canada in the 2015 Canadian federal election in the riding of Hochelaga, finishing behind New Democratic Party incumbent Marjolaine Boutin-Sweet by 500 votes. In 2017, Rizqy sought the Liberal nomination for the Saint-Laurent by-election caused by the resignation of Stéphane Dion. Rizqy was defeated for the nomination by eventual winner Emmanuella Lambropoulos.

In September 2024, she became opposition critic for Education and Higher Education, Treasury Board and Government Administration, Infrastructures, Tax Havens, and Consumer Protection. On June 19, 2025, she was named parliamentary leader of the Quebec Liberal Party by Pablo Rodriguez. She was removed as leader by Rodriguez in November 2025, after Rizqy fired Geneviève Hinse, her chief of staff, without consulting him. Hinse later filed a lawsuit against Rizqy. Rizqy was also expelled from caucus by Rodriguez, who sought to reinstate Hinse to her position. She did not seek re-election in the 2026 general election.

In October of 2026, Rizqy became a radio co-host for Québecor's QUB.

== Personal life ==
In June 2021, Rizqy announced her upcoming wedding to fellow Assembly member Greg Kelley; this was the first marriage between two sitting members of the Assembly. She gave birth to their first child, Gabriel, on October 6, 2022.

== Electoral record ==
=== Provincial ===
2022 Quebec general election: Saint-Laurent
Party	Candidate	Votes	%	±%
Liberal	Marwah Rizqy	14,304	49.97	-12.00
Coalition Avenir Québec	Mélanie Gauthier	4,091	14.29	-0.87
Conservative	Catherine St-Clair	3,973	13.88	+10.85
Québec solidaire	Gérard Briand	2,840	9.92	+1.30
Parti Québécois	Karl Dugal	1,696	5.92	-0.55
Bloc Montreal	Rizwan Muhammad Rajput	752	2.63	–
Canadian	Myrtis-Eirene Fossey	533	1.86	–
Green	Othmane Benzekri	439	1.53	-1.45
Total valid votes		28,628	98.68	–
Total rejected ballots		383	1.32	–
Turnout		29,011	50.96	
Electors on the lists		56,925		

2018 Quebec general election: Saint-Laurent
Party	Candidate	Votes	%	±%
Liberal	Marwah Rizqy	17,669	61.97	-20.31
Coalition Avenir Québec	Marc Baaklini	4,322	15.16	
Québec solidaire	Marie Josèphe Pigeon	2,458	8.62	+3.13
Parti Québécois	Elias Dib Nicolas	1,846	6.47	-1.66
Conservative	Guy Morissette	863	3.03	+1.93
Green	Halimatou Bah	849	2.98	+0.94
New Democratic	Jacques Dago	432	1.52	
Marxist–Leninist	Fernand Deschamps	75	0.26	-0.04
Total valid votes		28,514	98.60	
Total rejected ballots		406	1.40	
Turnout		28,920	50.96	
Eligible voters		56,749		
Liberal hold		Swing		-10.16
Source(s) "Rapport des résultats officiels du scrutin". Élections Québec.

=== Federal ===
2015 Canadian federal election: Hochelaga
Party	Candidate	Votes	%	±%	Expenditures
New Democratic	Marjolaine Boutin-Sweet	16,034	30.89	-16.59	$64,664.42
Liberal	Marwah Rizqy	15,534	29.93	+18.20	$19,746.32
Bloc Québécois	Simon Marchand	14,389	27.72	-3.04	$47,613.01
Conservative	Alexandre Dang	3,555	6.85	-0.35	$3,363.29
Green	Anne-Marie Saint-Cerny	1,654	3.19	+1.52	–
Rhinoceros	Nicolas Lemay	411	0.79	+0.26	$651.34
Communist	Marianne Breton Fontaine	179	0.34	-0.05	–
Marxist–Leninist	Christine Dandenault	148	0.29	-0.02	–
Total valid votes/expense limit		51,904	100.0		$219,682.85
Total rejected ballots		877	–	–	
Turnout		52,781	–	–	
Eligible voters		82,783			
These results were subject to a judicial recount, and modified from the validated results in accordance with the Judge's rulings. The margin of Marjolaine Boutin-Sweet over Marwah Rizqy decreased from 541 votes to 500 votes as a result of the recount.
Source: Elections Canada
