= Karl Blackburn =

Canadian business owner and politician

Member of the National Assembly
- In office April 14, 2003 – March 26, 2007
- Preceded by: Benoît Laprise
- Succeeded by: Denis Trottier
- Constituency: Roberval

Personal details
- Born: December 27, 1967 (age 58) Chicoutimi, Quebec
- Party: Quebec Liberal Party
- Parent: Gaston Blackburn
- Profession: Businessman

Karl Blackburn (born December 27, 1967) is a business owner and former political figure in Quebec. He represented Roberval in the Quebec National Assembly from 2003 to 2007 as a Liberal. He ran for leader in the 2025 Quebec Liberal Party leadership election, finishing third and announced he would not run for the leadership race in the 2026.

He was born in Chicoutimi, Quebec, the son of Gaston Blackburn and Nicole Desbiens, and was educated in London and at the Université du Québec à Chicoutimi. Blackburn is director general of the family business and owner of a hardware business. He has served as chairman of the Roberval Chamber of Commerce and vice-president of the Saint-Félicien Chamber of Commerce. He was defeated when he ran for reelection in 2007.
