= Ministry of Economic Development, Innovation and Export Trade =

Minister of Economic Development, Innovation and Export Trade (in French: Ministère du Développement économique, de l’Innovation et de l’Exportation) is in charge of the economic policy in the province. It is also charged with promoting the growth of R&D innovations in the province of Quebec.
