= Chaloult =

Chaloult is a surname. Notable people with the surname include:

- Dominique Chaloult, Canadian television executive
- René Chaloult (1901–1978), Canadian politician
