= 2022 Quebec general election =

Canadian provincial election

- October 3, 2022

125 seats in the National Assembly of Quebec 63 seats needed for a majority
- Opinion polls
- Turnout: 66.05% (▼0.40pp)
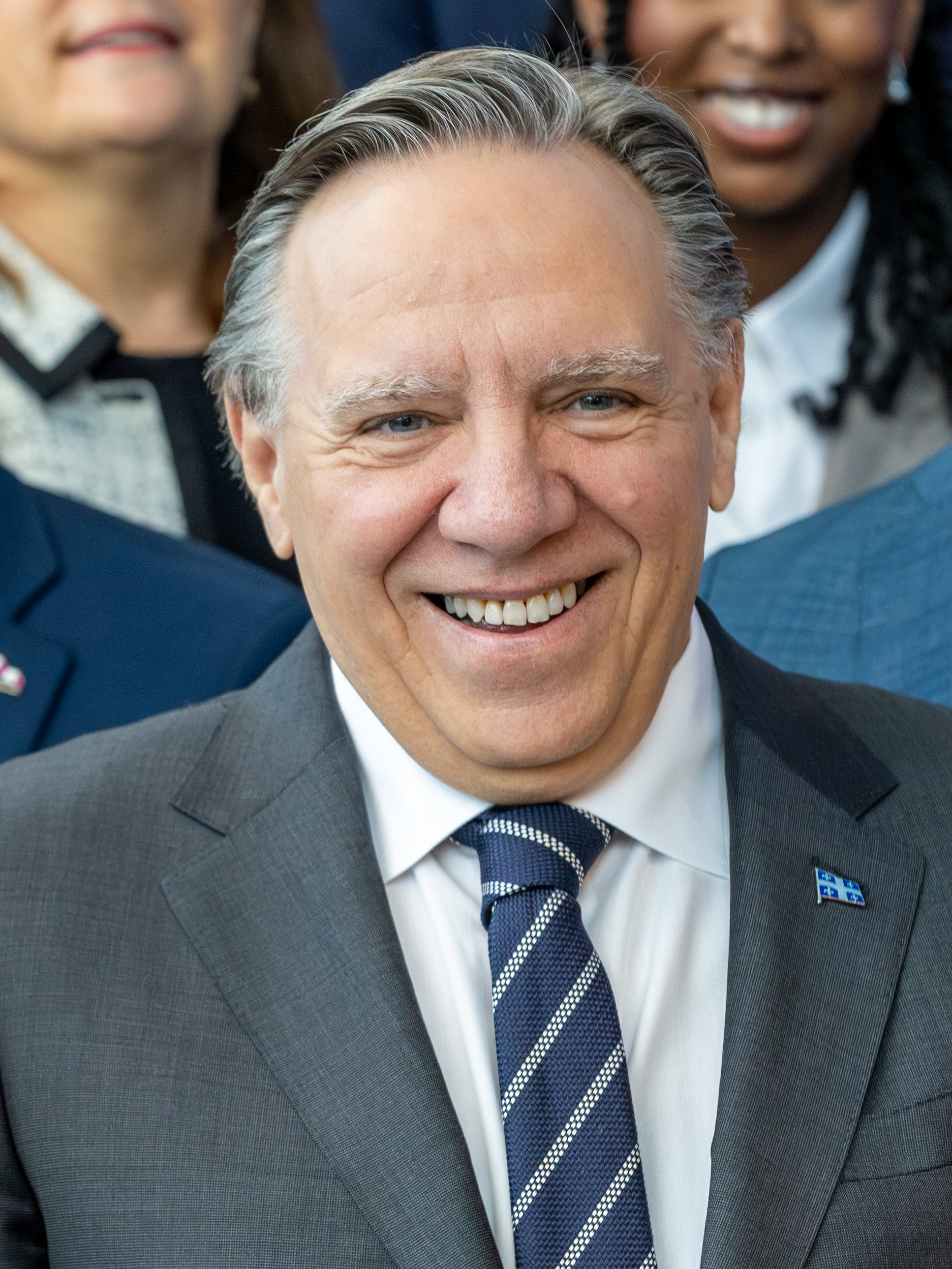

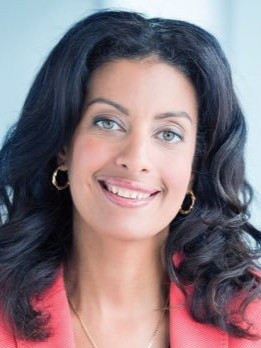

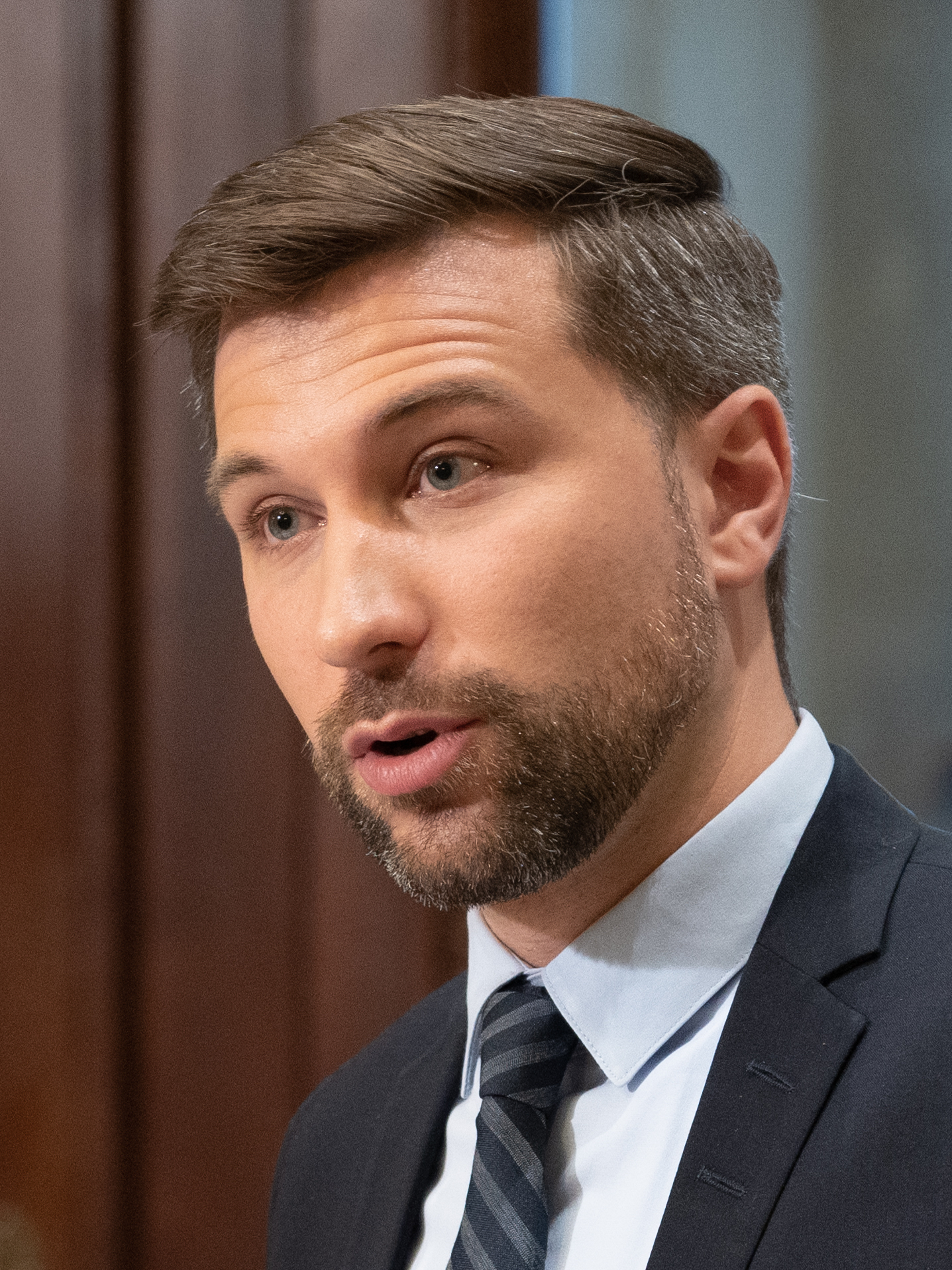

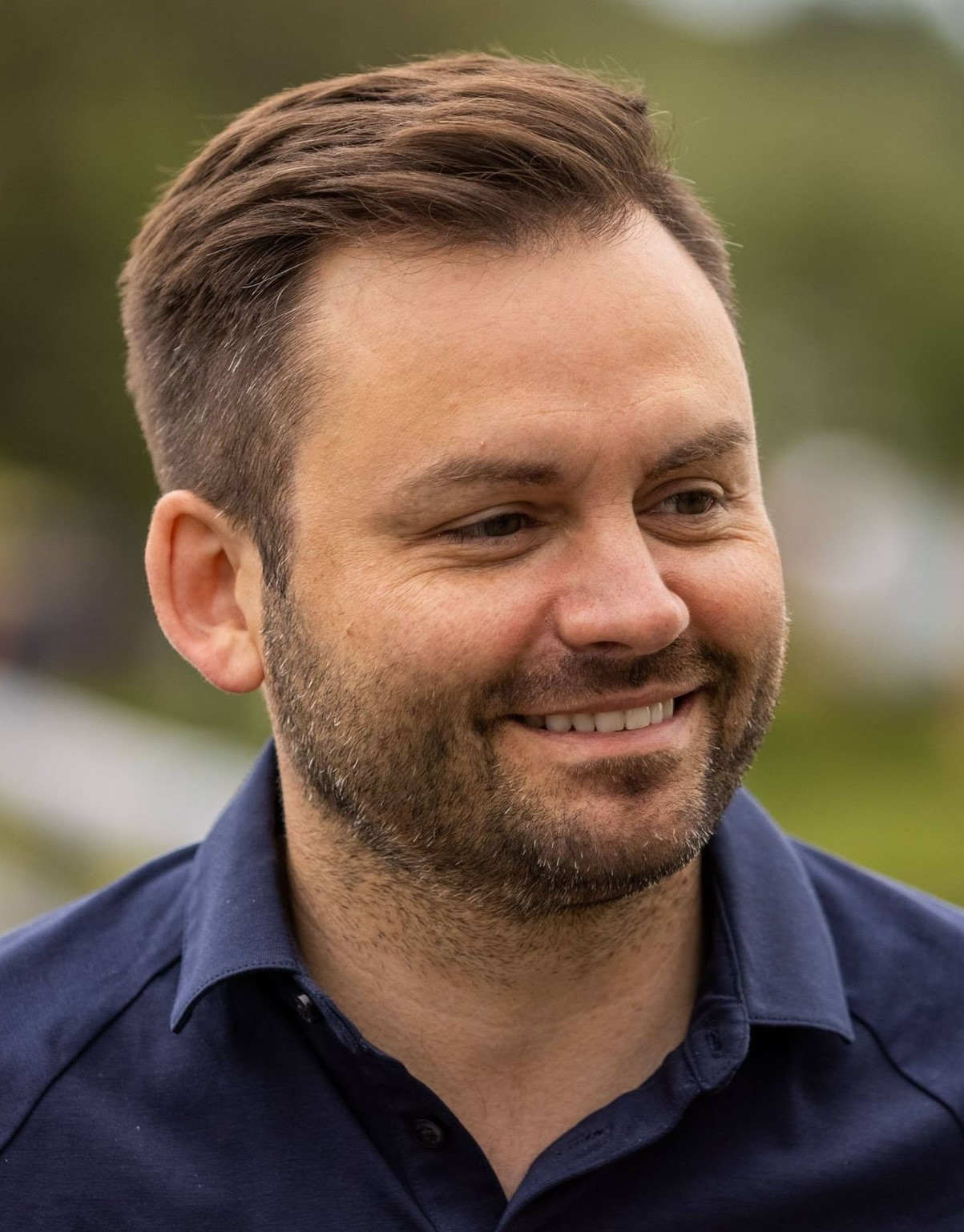

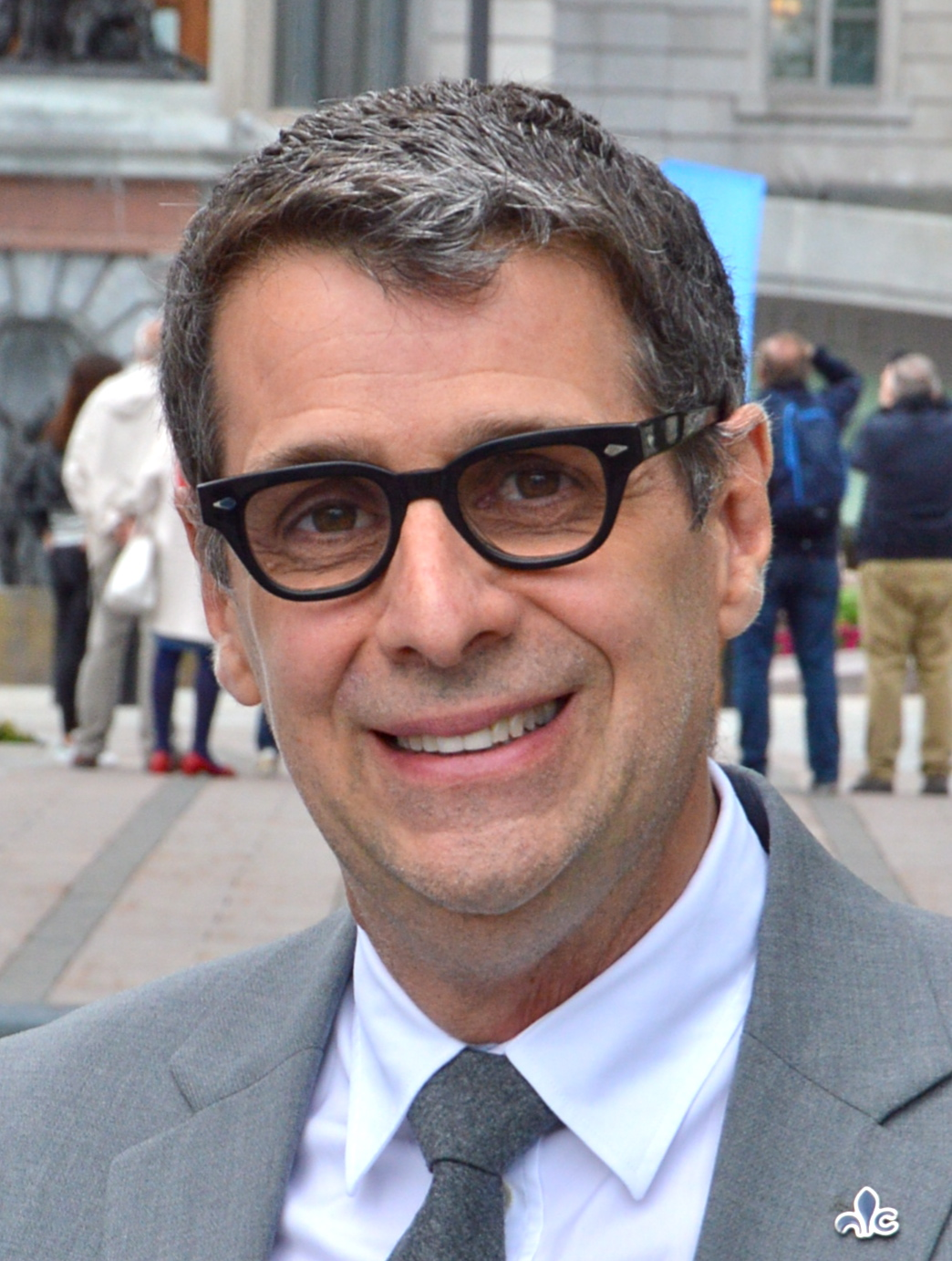
	Majority party	Minority party	Third party
Leader	François Legault	Dominique Anglade	Gabriel Nadeau-Dubois (Note: Québec solidaire designates Nadeau-Dubois and Manon Massé as co-spokespeople. Nadeau-Dubois was the party's candidate for premier during the 2022 election. The party's power is held by the general meetings of the members and a board of 16 directors; the de jure leader recognized by the Chief Electoral Officer of Quebec (DGE) is Nicolas Chatel-Launay.)
Party	Coalition Avenir Québec	Liberal	Québec solidaire
Leader since	November 4, 2011	May 11, 2020	May 21, 2017
Leader's seat	L'Assomption	Saint-Henri–Sainte-Anne	Gouin
Last election	74 seats, 37.42%	31 seats, 24.82%	10 seats, 16.10%
Seats before	76	27	10
Seats won	90	21	11
Seat change	▲14	▼6	▲1
Popular vote	1,685,573	591,077	634,535
Percentage	40.98%	14.37%	15.43%
Swing	▲3.56pp	▼10.45pp	▼0.67pp
	Fourth party	Fifth party
Leader	Paul St-Pierre Plamondon	Éric Duhaime
Party	Parti Québécois	Conservative
Leader since	October 9, 2020	April 17, 2021
Leader's seat	Camille-Laurin (won seat)	Ran in Chauveau (lost)
Last election	10 seats, 17.06%	0 seats, 1.46%
Seats before	7	1
Seats won	3	0
Seat change	▼4	▼1
Popular vote	600,708	530,786
Percentage	14.61%	12.91%
Swing	▼2.45pp	▲11.45pp
- Popular vote by riding. As this is an FPTP election, seat totals are not determined by popular vote, but instead by the result in each riding.
Premier before election
François Legault
Coalition Avenir Québec
Premier after election
François Legault
Coalition Avenir Québec

The 2022 Quebec general election was held on October 3, 2022, to elect the members of the National Assembly of Quebec. Under the province's fixed election date law, passed in 2013, "the general election following the end of a Legislature shall be held on the first Monday of October of the fourth calendar year following the year that includes the last day of the previous Legislature", setting the date for October 3, 2022.

Premier François Legault's Coalition Avenir Québec (CAQ) won a second term with an increased majority, the first time in 66 years that a party other than the Liberals and Parti Québecois (PQ) had been reelected. The Liberals dropped to their lowest raw seat count since 1956, their lowest percentage of seats won since 1948 and their lowest share of the popular vote in their history. The PQ had its worst general election result in history, losing most of its seats, but nevertheless managed to elect its previously seatless leader Paul St-Pierre Plamondon.

Previous promised plans for electoral reform were scrapped in 2021; as such, the election produced a highly distorted result which is common in Quebec's first past the post voting system. As Liberal votes were concentrated on the Island of Montreal, the party received more seats than the rest of the opposition parties combined, remaining the official opposition despite finishing fourth in the popular vote. In contrast, the Conservatives increased their share of the vote to 13%; however, as their support was more spread throughout Quebec, they did not win any seats. Quebecers elected the highest number of female candidates to the National Assembly in the province's history at 59, roughly 47% of the total number of seats.

== Background ==
The 2018 general election resulted in a landslide victory for the Coalition Avenir Québec (CAQ) led by François Legault, which won 74 of 125 seats, giving the party a majority and unseating Philippe Couillard's Liberal Party after a single term in office. Couillard subsequently resigned as Liberal leader and was replaced on an interim basis by Pierre Arcand until his successor was chosen.

Both the Parti Québécois and Québec solidaire won ten seats each, fewer than the twelve needed for official party status; Parti Québécois leader Jean-François Lisée, defeated in his bid for re-election, resigned as party leader, replaced on an interim basis by Pascal Bérubé until his permanent successor was chosen. Adrien D. Pouliot, leader of the Conservative Party of Quebec, announced that he was stepping down as leader on October 16, 2020.

Following Couillard's resignation, the Quebec Liberal Party held a leadership race. Dominique Anglade, former Deputy Premier of Quebec, was acclaimed leader of the party after her only rival, former mayor of Drummondville, Alexandre Cusson, stepped down. Following a leadership race, Paul St-Pierre Plamondon was elected leader of the sovereignist party by the members and supporters of the Parti Québécois. Following Pouliot's resignation, the Conservative Party of Quebec held a leadership race. Éric Duhaime, a radio host and former political advisor, was elected as leader with just under 96% of the vote.

=== Name change of electoral district ===
In its 2022 amendments to the Charter of the French Language, the National Assembly of Quebec also provided for renaming the electoral district of Bourget as Camille-Laurin, in honour of the Cabinet minister who promoted the original law.

=== Political parties and standings ===
The table below lists parties represented and seats held in the National Assembly after the 2018 provincial election and at dissolution.

Name	Ideology	Position	Leader	2018 Result		Seats at Dissolution
Name	Ideology	Position	Leader	Votes (%)	Seats	Seats at Dissolution
Coalition Avenir; Québec	Quebec nationalism Quebec autonomism Conservatism	Centre-right	François Legault	37.42%	74 / 125	76 / 125
Liberal	Quebec federalism Economic liberalism Liberalism	Centre	Dominique Anglade	24.82%	31 / 125	27 / 125
Québec solidaire	Quebec sovereigntism Democratic socialism Environmentalism	Left-wing	Gabriel Nadeau-Dubois	16.10%	10 / 125	10 / 125
Parti Québécois	Quebec sovereigntism Quebec nationalism Social democracy Economic nationalism	Centre-left	Paul St-Pierre Plamondon	17.06%	10 / 125	7 / 125
Conservative	Conservatism; Quebec federalism Fiscal conservatism	Centre-right to right-wing	Éric Duhaime	1.46%	0 / 125	1 / 125
Independents	N/A			0.16%	0 / 125	4 / 125
Vacant seats	N/A			–	0 / 125	0 / 125

== Timeline ==
Graph of Quebec general election results by share of votes, 1993–2022; omitted are minor parties consistently registering less than 2% of the vote as well as those who campaigned intermittently.
Graph of Quebec general election results by seats won, 1993–2022; those of independent MNAs are omitted.

42nd National Assembly of Quebec - Movement in seats held (2018-2022)
Party	2018	Gain/(loss) due to							2022
Party	2018	Resigned from party	Withdrawn from caucus	Resignation	Expulsion	Reinstatement	Change of allegiance	By-election gain	2022
Coalition Avenir Québec	74		(1)		(2)	2		3	76
Liberal	31			(2)	(2)				27
Parti Québécois	10	(1)	(1)		(1)				7
Québec solidaire	10								10
Conservative	–						1		1
Independent	–	1	2	(1)	5	(2)	(1)		4
Total	125	–	–	(3)	–	–	–	3	125

Changes in seats held (2018–2022)
Seat	Before				Change		
Seat	Date	Member	Party	Reason	Date	Member	Party
Roberval	October 4, 2018	Philippe Couillard	█ Liberal	Resignation (Note: from positions of Liberal Party leader and MNA)	December 10, 2018	Nancy Guillemette	█ CAQ
Chomedey	October 5, 2018	Guy Ouellette	█ Liberal	Expelled from caucus (Note: for allegedly leaking confidential information to the CAQ in 2016)			█ Independent
Marie-Victorin	March 11, 2019	Catherine Fournier	█ Parti Québécois	Resigned from caucus (Note: claiming that the party had lost its way ideologically)			█ Independent
Marie-Victorin	November 1, 2021	Catherine Fournier	█ Independent	Resignation (Note: after winning the election for Mayor of Longueuil)	April 12, 2022	Shirley Dorismond	█ CAQ
Jean-Talon	August 30, 2019	Sébastien Proulx	█ Liberal	Resignation (Note: to spend more time with family)	December 2, 2019	Joëlle Boutin	█ CAQ
Rimouski	December 15, 2020	Harold LeBel	█ Parti Québécois	Expelled from caucus (Note: amid further investigations relating to sexual assault allegations)			█ Independent
Rivière-du-Loup–Témiscouata	December 17, 2020	Denis Tardif	█ CAQ	Expelled from caucus (Note: for breaking COVID-19 restrictions)			█ Independent
Rivière-du-Loup–Témiscouata	April 12, 2021	Denis Tardif	█ Independent	Reinstated			█ CAQ
Rousseau	March 30, 2021	Louis-Charles Thouin	█ CAQ	Withdrew from caucus (Note: amid an ethics probe)			█ Independent
Rousseau	September 14, 2021	Louis-Charles Thouin	█ Independent	Reinstated			█ CAQ
Bonaventure	June 4, 2021	Sylvain Roy	█ Parti Québécois	Withdrew from caucus (Note: amid disagreements with party leadership)			█ Independent
Iberville	June 15, 2021	Claire Samson	█ CAQ	Expelled from caucus (Note: after giving a donation to the Conservative Party of Quebec)			█ Conservative
Maurice-Richard	November 1, 2021	Marie Montpetit	█ Liberal	Expelled from caucus (Note: after allegations of workplace harassment)			█ Independent

=== 2018 ===
- October 1, 2018: The Coalition Avenir Québec led by François Legault wins a majority government in the 42nd Quebec general election. Parti Québécois leader Jean-François Lisée, defeated in his bid for re-election, announces his resignation as party leader.
- October 5, 2018: Mont-Royal–Outremont MNA Pierre Arcand is named interim leader of the Quebec Liberal Party.
- October 9, 2018: Matane-Matapédia MNA Pascal Bérubé is named interim leader of the Parti Québécois.

=== 2020 ===
- March 20, 2020: The 2020 Quebec Liberal Party leadership election is suspended indefinitely due to the COVID-19 pandemic in Quebec.
- May 11, 2020: Saint-Henri–Sainte-Anne MNA Dominique Anglade is selected as leader of the Quebec Liberal Party by acclamation following the withdrawal of rival candidate Alexandre Cusson.
- October 9, 2020: Paul St-Pierre Plamondon wins the 2020 Parti Québécois leadership election.

=== 2021 ===
- April 17, 2021: Éric Duhaime wins the 2021 Conservative Party of Quebec leadership election.

=== 2022 ===
- May 13, 2022: The English language leaders' debate is called off for the election after two party leaders, (CAQ) Coalition Avenir Québec Premier François Legault, and PQ Parti Québécois leader Paul St-Pierre Plamondon refused to participate.

== Campaign ==
=== Contests ===
Candidate contests in the ridings
Candidates nominated	Ridings	Party																
Candidates nominated	Ridings	CAQ	PQ	PLQ	PCQ	QS	Green	CQ	DD	Cdn	Ind	BM	MLP	Auto	Nul	UFF	Oth	Totals
5	12	12	12	12	12	12												60
6	33	33	33	33	33	33	14	9	3					1	1	2	3	198
7	38	38	38	38	38	38	19	19	12	8	5	1	3	2	1	4	2	266
8	26	26	26	26	26	25	24	15	6	6	4	6	3	4	3	2	6	208
9	13	13	13	13	13	13	13	8	6	4	4	5	5	3	2	1	1	117
10	2	2	2	2	2	2	2	2	1	1	1	1			1		1	20
11	1	1	1	1	1	1	1	1		1			1		1		1	11
Total	125	125	125	125	125	124	73	54	28	20	14	13	12	10	9	9	14	880

=== Timeline ===
- August 28, 2022: Campaign period officially begins with the calling of an October 3 election.
- September 1, 2022: PQ Parti Québécois leader Paul St-Pierre Plamondon stages an event in Ottawa.
- September 4, 2022: Radio-Canada's Five leaders, one election.
- September 7, 2022: (CAQ) Coalition Avenir Québec Premier François Legault apologizes for comments linking immigration and 'extremism,' and 'violence'.
- September 11, 2022: In a speech in Drummondville (CAQ) Coalition Avenir Québec Premier François Legault, Says that non-French speaking immigration threatens Quebec cohesion. He was criticized by the leaders of Quebec solidaire, Quebec Liberal and Parti Québécois.
- September 12, 2022: (CAQ) Coalition Avenir Québec Premier François Legault defends the comments he said the day before about immigration.
- September 15, 2022: First leaders debate TVA Leaders' Debate.
- September 22, 2022: Radio Canada's Leaders' Debate.
- September 28, 2022: (CAQ) Coalition Avenir Québec Premier François Legault says during a speech, that having higher immigration numbers would be suicidal for Quebec and the French language. Legault was criticized by the other party leaders.
  - CAQ Immigration and labour minister Jean Boulet walks back from his past comments during a debate a few days before. He said that 80% of immigrants go to Montreal, don't work, don't speak French and don't adhere to the values of Quebec.

=== Party slogans ===
Party	French	English (translation)
█ CAQ	"Continuons."	"Now. Our record." ("Maintenant. Notre bilan.")
█ Liberal	"Votez vrai. Vrais enjeux. Vraies solutions."	"Vote for Real. Real issues. Real solutions." (identical to French slogan)
█ Québec solidaire	"Changer d'ère."	"Let's clear the air" (This is a rhyming pun, "Let's clear the era", in French – the play on words being between "ère", which means "era", and "air", which means the same as it does in English.)
█ Parti Québécois	"Le Québec qui s’assume. Pour vrai."	N/A (unofficial translation: "The Quebec that takes it on. For real.")
█ Conservative	"Libres chez nous."	"Freedom to choose." ("Libre de choisir.")

=== Issues ===
2022 Quebec election – issues and respective party platforms
Issue	CAQ	QLP	PQ	QS	PCQ/CPQ
Identity, diversity, language, and secularism			PQ would remove the bilingual status of municipalities where Anglophones make up less than 33% of residents.; PQ would apply Bill 101 to CEGEPs, which would mean restrictions to access to English-language colleges.; PQ would create “an office for the promotion of Quebec cultural content.”	QS would alter the province’s secularism law to let public sector workers affected by the legislation wear religious symbols at work, as long as their faces are uncovered.	
Immigration	CAQ would maintain immigration at around 50,000 per year which they said would be best matches the province’s “integration capacity.”; CAQ wants more control of immigration powers from Canada such as family reunification.	Liberals would increase immigration target to 70,000 a year.	PQ would reduce the annual number of immigrants to 35,000 from roughly 50,000.; A PQ government would also ensure that all economic immigrants have knowledge of French before they arrive	QS would increase annual immigration to between 60,000 and 80,000 people a year.	
Sovereignty					
Economy and public finance				QS has proposed to introduce wealth and inheritance taxes on the wealthiest 5% of Quebecers, which it states would raise $2.65 billion a year. This includes a wealth tax rate of 0.1% for those with net assets of $1 million to $10 million and a tax rate of 1% for those with assets worth $10 million to $99 million.	The PCQ has proposed to lower gasoline tax and end tax on second-hand goods.
Health care					
Education					
Child care and families					
Environment				Included within QS' climate plan is to create an intercity transport network that would make it possible to reach all cities by train and bus.; QS wants to support farmers in transitioning towards organic farming.; QS has plans to create an air quality auditor position in government, which would be given to an independent scientist who would enjoy powers similar to those of the Auditor General in the National Assembly.	
Transport				QS has planned for an eight-year, $47-billion infrastructure investment in the Montreal region’s public transit network, which would include subway expansion, a new tramway and reserved bus lanes.	
Housing				QS wants to buy 10,000 homes to resell at a discount.; QS wants to build 25,000 social housing units within the next four years if it forms a government, with a long term aim of increasing this figure to 50,000.	

=== Role of disinformation during the campaign ===
During the campaign, the issue of online political disinformation misleading voters has been raised by outlets including the Canadian Broadcasting Corporation (CBC). In September 2022, the CBC reported that opponents of COVID-19 pandemic restrictions used Facebook to spread a false rumor that Legault was booed out of a restaurant. According to CBC, "The post is one of many on social media that are misleading or outright false, with real-world consequences to both those who read it and to those involved in the event".

According to the Centre for Media, Technology and Democracy (MTD) at McGill University, false allegations that polling outlets are unfairly biased against certain parties have spread on social media. Some online supporters of the Conservative Party of Quebec alleged collusion between the governing Coalition Avenir Québec (CAQ) and polling firm Léger. In response, a citizens' initiative emerged on Facebook urging individuals to file complaints over Léger, despite the fact that Élections Québec has no power to regulate the polling industry.

== Candidates ==
The candidates standing for election generally had the following characteristics:

Candidates in the 2022 Quebec general election
Characteristic	Party					Overall
Characteristic	CAQ	Lib	PQ	QS	PCQ	Overall
Average age (years)	49	46	39	39	46	44
% who are women	55	45	42	55	38	47
% who are parents	81	70	58	54	68	67
% who are visible minority or Indigenous	11	27	6	18	10	14
% with a university degree	84	76	73	80	57	74
% born outside Quebec/Canada	11	28	6	9	16	9

=== Incumbents not running for reelection ===
Electoral district	Date announced	Incumbent at dissolution and subsequent nominee		New MNA
Anjou–Louis-Riel	August 30, 2021	Lise Thériault	Chantal Gagnon	Karine Boivin Roy
La Pinière	November 14, 2021	Gaétan Barrette	Linda Caron	Linda Caron
Mille-Îles	December 17, 2021	Francine Charbonneau	Virginie Dufour	Virginie Dufour
Iberville	January 13, 2022	Claire Samson	Anne Casabonne	Audrey Bogemans
Duplessis	January 19, 2022	Lorraine Richard	Marilou Vanier	Kateri Champagne Jourdain
Jonquière	March 1, 2022	Sylvain Gaudreault	Caroline Dubé	Yannick Gagnon
Rimouski	March 3, 2022	Harold LeBel	–	Maïté Blanchette Vézina
Acadie	March 21, 2022	Christine St-Pierre	André A. Morin	André A. Morin
Fabre	March 26, 2022	Monique Sauvé	Sonia Baudelot	Alice Abou-Khalil
Verchères	March 31, 2022	Suzanne Dansereau	Suzanne Roy	Suzanne Roy
Taschereau	April 1, 2022	Catherine Dorion	Étienne Grandmont	Étienne Grandmont
Marguerite-Bourgeoys	April 2, 2022	Hélène David	Fred Beauchemin	Fred Beauchemin
Laporte	April 2, 2022	Nicole Ménard	Mathieu Gratton	Isabelle Poulet
Vimont	April 2, 2022	Jean Rousselle	Anabela Monteiro	Valérie Schmaltz
Sanguinet	April 8, 2022	Danielle McCann	Christine Fréchette	Christine Fréchette
Prévost	April 8, 2022	Marguerite Blais	Sonia Bélanger	Sonia Bélanger
D'Arcy-McGee	April 11, 2022	David Birnbaum	Elisabeth Prass	Elisabeth Prass
Rivière-du-Loup–Témiscouata	April 15, 2022	Denis Tardif	Amélie Dionne	Amélie Dionne
Charlevoix–Côte-de-Beaupré	April 19, 2022	Émilie Foster	Kariane Bourassa	Kariane Bourassa
Joliette	April 21, 2022	Véronique Hivon	Véronique Venne	François St-Louis
Huntingdon	April 29, 2022	Claire IsaBelle	Carole Mallette	Carole Mallette
Bourassa-Sauvé	May 6, 2022	Paule Robitaille	Madwa-Nika Cadet	Madwa-Nika Cadet
Mont-Royal–Outremont	May 8, 2022	Pierre Arcand	Michelle Setlakwe	Michelle Setlakwe
Châteauguay	May 20, 2022	MarieChantal Chassé	Marie-Belle Gendron	Marie-Belle Gendron
Maurice-Richard	May 24, 2022	Marie Montpetit	–	Haroun Bouazzi
Lévis	June 3, 2022	François Paradis	Bernard Drainville	Bernard Drainville
Robert-Baldwin	June 4, 2022	Carlos Leitão	Brigitte Garceau	Brigitte Garceau
Notre-Dame-de-Grâce	June 6, 2022	Kathleen Weil	Désirée McGraw	Désirée McGraw
René-Lévesque	June 14, 2022	Martin Ouellet	Jeff Dufour-Tremblay	Yves Montigny
Bonaventure	July 4, 2022	Sylvain Roy	–	Catherine Blouin
Repentigny	July 5, 2022	Lise Lavallée	Pascale Déry	Pascale Déry
Bertrand	July 12, 2022	Nadine Girault	France-Élaine Duranceau	France-Élaine Duranceau
Chutes-de-la-Chaudière	August 3, 2022	Marc Picard	Martine Biron	Martine Biron
Côte-du-Sud	August 22, 2022	Marie-Eve Proulx	Mathieu Rivest	Mathieu Rivest
Chomedey	August 29, 2022	Guy Ouellette	–	Sona Lakhoyan Olivier

=== Candidate controversies ===
==== Quebec Liberal Party ====
- Deepak Awasti, the party's candidate in Laurier-Dorion, for denying Quebec's right to register itself as a nation within the Canadian constitution and to have French as its sole official language, contrary to his party's official position.

==== Parti Québécois ====
- Pierre Vanier, the party's candidate in Rousseau, for past social media posts emerged where Vanier expressed anti-Islamic views. He was suspended as a candidate.
- Catherine Provost, the party's candidate in L’Assomption, for past social media posts emerged where Provost expressed Anti-Islam views.
- Lyne Jubinville, the party's candidate in Sainte-Rose, for past social media posts emerged where Jubinville expressed Anti-Islam views.
- Andréanne Fiola, candidate for Laval-des-Rapides, previously made porn. Party leader Paul St-Pierre Plamondon defended Fiola and condemned the individuals who outed her.
- Paul St-Pierre Plamondon's use of the word nègre during a televised debate.

==== Québec Solidaire ====
- Marie-Eve Rancourt, the party's candidate in Camille-Laurin, withdrew from the race after she was caught removing PQ leaflets.
- Gabriel Nadeau-Dubois' use of the word nègre during a televised debate.

==== Coalition Avenir Québec ====
- Shirley Dorismond, the party's candidate in Marie-Victorin, for blocking numerous constituents and electors on social media after facing criticisms on her comments about the September 13, 2022 floods in Longueuil.

== Opinion polls ==
This chart depicts opinion polls conducted since the 2018 election, using a local regression. The table below provides a list of scientific, public opinion polls that were conducted from the 2018 Quebec general election leading up to the 2022 Quebec general election, which was held on October 3, 2022.

Evolution of voting intentions since the 2018 Quebec general election campaign. Plot generated in R from data in the table below. Trendlines are local regressions, with polls weighted by proximity in time.

Timeline of opinion polls
Polling organisation	Last date of polling	Source	Sample size	MoE	CAQ	PLQ	PQ	QS	PCQ	Other	Lead
2022 election	October 3, 2022		4,169,137	N/A	41.0	14.4	14.6	15.4	12.9	1.7	25.6
Mainstreet (Exit Poll)	October 3, 2022	PDF	6109	±1.3%	50.2	8.8	21.0	8.9	10.1	1.2	29.2
Forum	October 2, 2022	PDF	981	±3%	36.8	15.4	17.2	14.3	14.4	1.9	19.6
Research Co.	October 2, 2022	HTML	708	±3.7%	41	16	12	14	16	1	25
Mainstreet	October 2, 2022	PDF	1,508	±2.5%	41.4	14.8	14.0	12.0	16.7	1.2	24.7
Mainstreet	October 1, 2022	PDF	1,445	±2.6%	41.7	14.9	13.1	11.6	17.8	1.1	23.9
Mainstreet	September 30, 2022	PDF	1,463	±2.6%	41.3	15.4	12.8	11.2	18.4	1.0	22.9
Léger	September 30, 2022	URL	950	±3.1%	38	17	15	15	14	2	21
Mainstreet	September 29, 2022	PDF	1,516	±2.5%	40.3	17.7	12.9	12.5	14.9	1.9	22.6
Mainstreet	September 28, 2022	PDF	1,523	±2.5%	40.3	15.7	11.9	13.5	16.4	2.3	23.9
Mainstreet	September 27, 2022	PDF	1,533	±2.5%	39.1	16.8	12.4	12.8	16.5	2.4	22.6
Mainstreet	September 26, 2022	PDF	1,555	±2.5%	42.1	16.0	10.7	11.3	17.3	2.6	24.8
Main party leaders attend "Tout le monde en parle." (September 25, 2022)
Léger	September 25, 2022	URL	1,023	±3.1%	37	16	15	17	15	0	20
Mainstreet	September 25, 2022	PDF	1,529	±2.5%	41.8	16.5	10.0	9.9	18.7	3.1	23.1
Mainstreet	September 24, 2022	PDF	1,209	±2.8%	43.5	15.5	7.8	11.0	19.1	3.1	24.4
Mainstreet	September 23, 2022	PDF	1,114	±2.8%	38.8	16.8	9.4	14.1	19.3	2.6	19.5
EKOS	September 23, 2022	PDF	589	±4.0%	34.6	14.3	14.9	20.6	12.3	3.6	14.0
Radio Canada's Leaders' Debate. (September 22, 2022)
Angus Reid	September 22, 2022	PDF	1,221	±2.5%	34	16	12	16	19	2 (Note: Including PVQ at 1%)	15
Mainstreet	September 22, 2022	PDF	1,192	±2.8%	39.2	15.4	9.7	14.4	19.2	2.9	20.0
Research Co.	September 21, 2022	HTML	700	±3.7%	40	17	10	14	18	1	22
Mainstreet	September 21, 2022	PDF	1,472	±2.6%	39.3	15.1	10.3	14.2	18.3	2.7	21.0
Mainstreet	September 20, 2022	PDF	1,467	±2.6%	39.2	14.3	10.6	14.0	19.0	2.9	20.3
Segma	September 20, 2022	HTML	1,080	±3%	40	14	14	16	14	1	26
Mainstreet	September 19, 2022	PDF	1,538	±2.5%	38.7	15.6	9.9	12.9	19.8	3.1	18.9
Léger	September 18, 2022	URL	1,046	±3.0%	38	16	13	16	16	1	22
Mainstreet	September 18, 2022	PDF	1,538	±2.5%	39.5	16.5	9.9	11.9	19.7	2.5	19.8
Mainstreet	September 17, 2022	PDF	1,846	±2.5%	41.8	17.7	8.1	11.2	17.8	3.3	24.0
Mainstreet	September 16, 2022	PDF	1,641	±2.5%	41.0	17.5	8.1	11.0	18.7	3.7	22.3
TVA Leaders' Debate. (September 15, 2022)
Mainstreet	September 15, 2022	PDF	1,523	±2.5%	42.4	17.6	7.0	10.8	18.3	3.9	24.1
Mainstreet	September 14, 2022	PDF	1,530	±2.5%	41.8	17.3	7.4	10.8	18.9	3.8	22.9
Mainstreet	September 13, 2022	PDF	1,529	±2.5%	41.4	17.8	7.5	10.5	19.3	3.5	22.1
Léger	September 12, 2022	PDF	3,100	±1.8%	38	18	11	17	15	2	20
Mainstreet	September 12, 2022	PDF	1,525	±2.5%	43.0	17.6	7.1	10.6	18.5	3.2	24.5
Mainstreet	September 11, 2022	PDF	1,499	±2.5%	40.8	18.4	8.0	10.9	18.5	3.5	22.3
Mainstreet	September 10, 2022	PDF	1,489	±2.5%	40.9	17.6	7.5	10.6	19.7	3.7	21.2
Mainstreet	September 9, 2022	PDF	1,500	±2.5%	40.6	18.1	8.8	9.7	19.2	3.7	21.4
Mainstreet	September 8, 2022	PDF	1,534	±2.5%	38.3	18.4	9.2	10.4	19.2	4.5	19.1
Mainstreet	September 7, 2022	PDF	1,548	±2.5%	37.5	18.1	10.2	11.4	18.6	4.3	18.9
Mainstreet	September 6, 2022	PDF	1,569	±2.5%	37.9	17.6	11.4	11.0	17.5	4.7	20.3
Mainstreet	September 5, 2022	PDF	1,537	±2.5%	37.6	18.4	10.6	12.0	16.3	5.1	19.2
Radio-Canada's Five leaders, one election. (September 4, 2022)
Mainstreet	September 4, 2022	PDF	1,511	±2.6%	38.5	18.1	10.5	11.8	17.5	3.6	20.4
Mainstreet	September 3, 2022	PDF	1,497	±2.6%	37.5	18.3	9.4	12.5	18.3	4.1	19.2
Mainstreet	September 2, 2022	PDF	1,462	±2.6%	37.4	18.1	7.6	12.8	20.3	3.9	17.1
Mainstreet	September 1, 2022	PDF	1,417	±2.6%	38.2	17.6	7.5	13.4	19.9	3.4	18.3
Mainstreet	August 31, 2022	PDF	1,210	±2.8%	38.9	19.7	6.6	13.3	16.8	4.7	19.2
Mainstreet	August 30, 2022	PDF	1,676	±2.4%	40.9	17.7	6.9	12.0	18.2	4.3	22.7
Mainstreet	August 29, 2022	PDF	1,386	±2.6%	40.4	18.7	7.8	11.6	17.7	3.7	21.7
Mainstreet	August 28, 2022	PDF	1,067	±3%	38.1	17.4	7.0	12.1	21.5	3.9	16.6
Campaign period officially begins with the calling of an October 3 election. (August 28, 2022)
Léger	August 26, 2022	PDF	1,000	±3.1%	42	17	9	15	14	3	25
Léger	July 31, 2022	PDF	985	±3.1%	44	18	10	15	13	1	26
Léger	June 22, 2022	PDF	1,019	±3.1%	41	18	9	14	15	3	23
Angus Reid	June 13, 2022	PDF	1,211	±2.5%	35	18	10	14	19	4 (Note: Including PVQ at 2%)	16
Mainstreet	June 10, 2022	PDF	1,404	±3%	39.9	20.8	8.3	12.3	16.6	2	19.1
Léger	May 22, 2022	PDF	1,019	±3.1%	46	18	8	13	14	2	28
CAQ passes Bill 96, strengthening Bill 101, the French language law. (May 24, 2022)
Léger	April 17, 2022	PDF	1,020	±3.1%	44	17	9	15	13	2	27
Synopsis Recherche	March 17, 2022	PDF	1,000	—N/a	44	15	8	15	16	2	28
Angus Reid	March 15, 2022	URL	761	±3%	33	19	9	16	19	4 (Note: Including PVQ at 2%)	14
Mainstreet	March 15, 2022	PDF	1,200	±3%	36.2	16.1	6.8	17.3	23.6	—N/a	12.6
Léger	March 6, 2022	HTML	1,017	±3.1%	41	18	10	14	14	3	23
Léger	February 13, 2022	PDF	1,017	±3.1%	41	20	11	12	14	2	21
Léger	January 16, 2022	HTML	1,032	±3.1%	42	20	11	14	11	3	22
Angus Reid	January 12, 2022	PDF	760	±3%	37	20	12	16	9	5 (Note: Including PVQ at 3%)	17
Mainstreet	January 8, 2022	HTML	1,024	—N/a	38	20	10	19	13	—N/a	16
Léger	November 28, 2021	PDF	1,024	±3.1%	46	20	13	13	5	3	26
Angus Reid	October 3, 2021	HTML	716	—N/a	37	21	10	15	11	6 (Note: Including PVQ at 3%)	16
Léger	September 29, 2021	PDF	1,008	±3.1%	47	20	11	11	8	3	27
Synopsis Recherche	August 30, 2021	HTML	1,500	—N/a	49	16	9	14	9	3	33
Angus Reid	June 8, 2021	PDF	679	±3%	41	21	11	14	8	4 (Note: Including PVQ at 3%)	20
CAQ announce Bill 96 which will be strengthening Bill 101, the French language law. (May 12, 2021)
Leger	May 1, 2021	HTML	1,015	±3.1%	46	20	12	14	6	3	26
Éric Duhaime is elected as leader of the Conservative Party of Quebec (April 17, 2021)
Mainstreet	February 9, 2021	PDF	1,012	±3.08%	48	21	11	12	—N/a	8	27
Leger	December 13, 2020	PDF	1,004	±3.1%	49	22	14	11	—N/a	5	27
Angus Reid	November 30, 2020	PDF	768	—N/a	38	23	15	10	9	3 (Note: Including PVQ at 2%)	13
Leger	November 25, 2020	HTML	1,000	±3.1%	44	23	14	12	—N/a	7	21
Leger	October 18, 2020	PDF	1,011	±3.1%	50	18	16	13	—N/a	3	32
Paul St-Pierre Plamondon is elected as leader of the Parti Québécois (October 9, 2020)
Leger	September 3, 2020	PDF	1,000	±3.1%	48	22	17	11	—N/a	3	26
EKOS	August 28, 2020	HTML	5,039	±1.53%	57	17	11	9	—N/a	6	40
Innovative Research Group	July 20, 2020	PDF	565	—N/a	38	29	17	9	—N/a	8	11
EKOS	July 3, 2020	HTML	1,870	±2.5%	59	19	8	9	—N/a	5	40
Innovative Research Group	June 23, 2020	PDF	263	—N/a	39	29	21	5	—N/a	7	10
Leger	June 21, 2020	PDF	1,002	±3.0%	51	22	14	10	—N/a	4	29
Innovative Research Group	June 1, 2020	PDF	257	—N/a	38	28	16	9	—N/a	9	10
Leger	May 25, 2020	HTML	1,203	—N/a	54	22	11	8	—N/a	5	32
Angus Reid	May 24, 2020	HTML	739	—N/a	50	22	11	10	3	4	28
Dominique Anglade is elected as leader of the Quebec Liberal Party (May 11, 2020)
Innovative Research Group	May 5, 2020	PDF	257	—N/a	35	32	17	8	—N/a	6	3
EKOS	March 26, 2020	HTML	578	±4.1%	51.9	19.2	14.4	10.4	—N/a	4	32.7
Leger	March 16, 2020	PDF	1,006	±3.1%	46	22	18	10	—N/a	3	24
State of emergency declared due to the COVID-19 pandemic (March 13, 2020)
Angus Reid	February 28, 2020	PDF	638	±3.7%	36	22	17	16	3	6	14
Leger	February 17, 2020	PDF	1,017	±3.1%	40	28	18	15	—N/a	—N/a	12
Leger	January 15, 2020	HTML	1,202	±2.8%	42	23	19	11	—N/a	5	19
CAQ wins the by-election in Jean-Talon (December 2, 2019)
Leger	November 25, 2019	HTML	1,000	±3.1%	38	27	19	10	—N/a	6	11
Forum	July 24, 2019	PDF	977	±3%	42	22	12	15	—N/a	10	20
Mainstreet	July 2, 2019	HTML	871	±3.32%	47.8	21.7	10.5	14.5	—N/a	5.6	26.1
CAQ passes Bill 21 "An Act respecting the laicity of the State" (June 16, 2019)
Forum	June 12, 2019	PDF	1,407–71	±2.5%	46	16	13	19	—N/a	6	24
Leger	May 21, 2019	HTML	979	±3%	46	23	14	13	—N/a	4	23
Mainstreet	March 21, 2019	PDF	940	±3.20%	45.3	22.3	10.4	14.7	—N/a	7.2	23.0
Leger	March 11, 2019	PDF (Note: Archived August 14, 2019, at the Wayback Machine)	1,014	±3.08%	44	21	15	15	—N/a	5	23
Leger	January 28, 2019	PDF (Note: Archived November 7, 2020, at the Wayback Machine)	1,007	±3.09%	42	22	18	15	—N/a	3	20
Mainstreet	January 18, 2019	PDF	979	±3.13%	44.5	26.1	8.9	15.8	—N/a	4.8	18.4
CAQ wins the by-election in Roberval (December 10, 2018)
Mainstreet	November 7, 2018	HTML	896	±3.27%	39.4	22.8	14.1	19.0	—N/a	4.7	16.6
2018 election	October 1, 2018		4,033,538		37.4	24.8	17.1	16.1	1.5	3.1	12.6

=== Francophones polling ===
Francophones Polling

Timeline of opinion polls
Polling organisation	Last date of polling	Source	Sample size	MoE	CAQ	PLQ	PQ	QS	PCQ	Other	Lead
Léger	August 26, 2022	PDF			51	7	11	16	13	2	35
Léger	July 31, 2022	PDF			50	10	12	16	11	0	34
Léger	June 19, 2022	PDF			50	10	9	15	13	0	35
Angus Reid	June 13, 2022	PDF			43	6	12	16	20	2	23
Mainstreet	June 10, 2022	PDF			42	15	10	14	17	2	35
Léger	May 22, 2022	PDF			53	9	10	14	12	1	39
Léger	April 17, 2022	PDF			50	11	11	16	12	1	34
Léger	March 17, 2022	PDF			49	8	10	16	16	1	33
Mainstreet	March 15, 2022	PDF			42	9	8	18	23	1	19
Léger	March 6, 2022	PDF			47	11	12	15	15	1	32
Léger	February 13, 2022	PDF			48	10	13	13	15	2	33
Léger	January 16, 2022	PDF			48	12	12	14	12	2	34
Angus Reid	January 12, 2022	PDF			46	7	16	19	9	4	27
Mainstreet	January 8, 2022	PDF			43	12	10	21	15	0	22
Léger	November 28, 2021	PDF			52	9	16	14	6	3	36
Léger	September 30, 2021	PDF			54	10	13	12	7	3	41
Léger	August 30, 2021	PDF			53	9	11	16	9	0	37
Léger	May 2, 2021	PDF			52	10	15	15	5	2	37
Mainstreet	February 9, 2021	PDF			54	11	14	12	0	8	40
Léger	December 13, 2020	PDF			57	11	17	11	0	4	40
Léger	October 18, 2020	PDF			59	7	18	14		2	41
Léger	September 3, 2020	PDF			55	9	20	13		3	35
Ekos	August 26, 2020	PDF			61	12	10	12		5	49
Ekos	July 3, 2020	PDF			64	13	9	9		4	51
Léger	June 21, 2020	PDF			58	11	17	11		4	41
Léger	March 16, 2020	PDF			56	9	22	10		3	34
Léger	November 25, 2019	PDF			46	15	23	11		4	23
Forum	July 24, 2019	PDF			49	14	14	16		8	33
Léger	May 21, 2019	PDF			55	10	15	16		3	39
Léger	March 11, 2019	PDF			52	10	18	17		3	34
Mainstreet	18 January 2019	PDF			52	16	10	17		4	35
Mainstreet	November 7, 2018	PDF			44	13	17	21		4	23

=== Non Francophones ===
Anglophones Polling

Timeline of opinion polls
Polling organisation	Last date of polling	Source	Sample size	MoE	CAQ	PLQ	PQ	QS	PCQ	Other	Lead
Léger	August 26, 2022	PDF			13	53	2	12	16	5	37
Léger	July 31, 2022	PDF			17	46	1	11	20	5	26
Léger	June 19, 2022	PDF			9	49	5	10	22	5	27
Angus Reid	June 13, 2022	PDF			4	61	2	6	17	9	44
Mainstreet	June 10, 2022	PDF			34	42	3	7	14	1	8
Mainstreet	June 10, 2022	PDF			34	42	3	7	14	1	8
Léger	May 22, 2022	PDF			18	48	1	8	19	6	29
Léger	April 17, 2022	PDF			19	46	1	12	16	6	27
SRM	March 17, 2022	PDF			22	47	1	6	19	5	25
Mainstreet	March 15, 2022	PDF			10	50	2	13	25		25
Léger	March 6, 2022	PDF			20	46	5	11	11	7	26
Léger	February 13, 2022	PDF			13	59	3	10	8	6	56
Léger	January 16, 2022	PDF			22	48	9	11	6	4	26
Angus Reid	January 12, 2022	PDF			11	61	1	8	9	9	50
Mainstreet	January 8, 2022	PDF			13	62	10	9	6	0	49
Léger	November 28, 2021	PDF			23	57	2	9	4	4	34
Léger	September 30, 2021	PDF			19	55	3	8	10	5	36
Léger	May 2, 2021	PDF			22	55	1	9	7	7	33
Mainstreet	February 9, 2021	PDF			26	58	1	9		7	32
Léger	December 13, 2020	PDF			19	61	3	9		7	42
Léger	October 18, 2020	PDF			20	58	8	9		5	38
Léger	September 3, 2020	PDF			20	66	4	6		4	46
Ekos	August 26, 2020	PDF			17	60	1	6		16	43
Ekos	July 3, 2020	PDF			11	72	0	3		13	59
Léger	June 21, 2020	PDF			24	62	2	7		5	38
Léger	March 16, 2020	PDF			12	68	4	10		6	56
Léger	November 25, 2019	PDF			9	70	3	7		11	59
Léger	May 21, 2019	PDF			13	68	8	3		8	55
Léger	March 11, 2019	PDF			10	66	3	9		12	54
Mainstreet	18 January 2019	PDF			17	62	3	11		7	45
Mainstreet	November 7, 2018	PDF			22	60	2	9		7	38

== Cancelled electoral reform referendum ==
Québec's 2022 Electoral reform Referendum (government proposal)
- October 3, 2022
- Do you agree with replacing the first-past-the-post electoral system by the mixed electoral system with regional compensation set out in the Act to establish a new electoral system? French: Êtes-vous en accord avec le remplacement du mode de scrutin majoritaire uninominal à un tour par le mode de scrutin mixte avec compensation régionale prévu par la Loi établissant un nouveau mode de scrutin?

François Legault was elected on a promise to reform the electoral system within a year of his victory. On September 25, 2019, Minister of Justice Sonia LeBel presented Bill 39, An Act to establish a new electoral system which aims to replace the first-past-the-post electoral system in favour of a mixed-member proportional representation system. According to the bill, the National Assembly would have kept 125 members. Of the 125 members, 80 would have been elected by receiving a plurality of votes in single-member districts, similar to the existing system, matching the 78 federal ridings with the addition of 2 unique districts: Îles-de-la-Madeleine and Ungava. The remaining 45 members would have been chosen according to their order in a regional party list. All 17 regions of Québec would have been guaranteed at least one MNA.

The proposed system was as such:

Federal region	Provincial region	District seats	Regional seats	% of electors	% of MNAs
Eastern Quebec	Gaspésie–Îles-de-la-Madeleine	2	1	1.2%	2.4%
Eastern Quebec	Bas-Saint-Laurent	2	1	2.6%	2.4%
Quebec City	Capitale-Nationale	7	4	9.2%	8.8%
Quebec City	Chaudière-Appalaches	4	3	5.4%	5.4%
Eastern Townships	Centre-du-Québec	3	2	3.1%	4.0%
Eastern Townships	Estrie	3	2	4.0%	4.0%
Montérégie	Montérégie	14	8	18.9%	17.6%
Hochelaga (East Montreal, West; Montreal, North Montreal & Laval)	Montreal	16	8	21.5%	19.2%
Hochelaga (East Montreal, West; Montreal, North Montreal & Laval)	Laval	4	2	5.0%	4.8%
Côte-Nord and Saguenay	Saguenay–Lac-Saint-Jean	3	2	3.6%	4.0%
Côte-Nord and Saguenay	Côte-Nord	1	1	1.1%	1.6%
Central Quebec	Mauricie	3	2	3.5 %	4.0%
Central Quebec	Lanaudière	5	3	6.3 %	6.4%
The Laurentides, Outaouais and Northern Quebec	Laurentides	6	3	7.6 %	7.2%
The Laurentides, Outaouais and Northern Quebec	Outaouais	4	2	4.6 %	4.8%
The Laurentides, Outaouais and Northern Quebec	Abitibi-Témiscamingue	2	1	1.9%	2.4%
The Laurentides, Outaouais and Northern Quebec	Nord-du-Québec	1	0	0.5%	0.8%
TOTAL		80	45		

Bill 39 was intended to be debated in the legislature before June 2021. The bill's implementation would have been contingent on popular support expressed in a referendum held on the same day as the general election. Had this referendum been successful, then the first legislature to be elected under mixed-member proportional would have been the 44th, in October 2026 at the latest. On April 28, 2021, Justice Minister LeBel informed a legislative committee hearing that the government would not move forward with a referendum on electoral reform in 2022. LeBel blamed the COVID-19 pandemic for altering the government's timeline and could not or would not commit to providing an alternate date for the referendum, effectively ending discussions about electoral reform in Quebec.

== Results and analysis ==
All parties experienced uneven results across the province:

- While the CAQ saw its share of the vote rise by over 10 percentage points from 2018 in 21 ridings, its support also declined in 38 ridings, most significantly in those in Centre-du-Québec and Chaudière-Appalaches. In those regions, and in Mauricie, the contests were between the CAQ and the Conservatives. In Quebec City, Québec Solidaire is also a significant player. In the Côte-Nord and Saguenay–Lac-Saint-Jean its principal opponent is the PQ.
- The Liberal Party lost support in all ridings, with the exception of Marquette, and its decline in the ridings along the Orange Line in Montreal worsened from 2014. In Saguenay–Lac-Saint-Jean, its share of the vote fell to 4%, and in the Côte-Nord it dropped to 3%.
- Québec Solidaire lost the riding of Rouyn-Noranda–Témiscamingue only because of a swing from the Liberals to the CAQ.
- While the PQ lost several strongholds—notably in Jonquière, René-Lévesque and Rimouski—its support remained stable in 29 ridings and showed small gains in 28 others.
- The Conservative Party saw its total share of the vote increase ninefold with its percentage vote share rising in all contests, and in 12 ridings it increased by more than 20 percentage points. In addition to its strong gains in the regions south of Quebec City—with several second-place results—it also received significant anglophone support in Laval (Chomedey, Sainte-Dorothee), the West Island ridings of Nelligan, Robert-Baldwin and D'Arcy-McGee.

In Beauce-Nord, the Conservatives sought a judicial recount as they had come within 202 votes of defeating the CAQ incumbent Luc Provençal. The application was dismissed by the Court of Quebec.

=== Overview ===
Elections to the 43rd Quebec Legislature (2022)
Party	Leader	Candidates	Votes				Seats		
Party	Leader	Candidates	#	±	%	Change (pp)	2018	2022	±
Coalition Avenir Québec	François Legault	125	1,685,573	▲176,124	40.98	▲3.56	74	90 / 125	▲16
Québec solidaire	Gabriel Nadeau-Dubois; Manon Massé	125	634,535	▼14,968	15.43	▼0.67	10	11 / 125	▲1
Parti Québécois	Paul St-Pierre Plamondon	125	600,708	▼87,287	14.61	▼2.45	10	3 / 125	▼7
Liberal	Dominique Anglade	125	591,077	▼409,960	14.37	▼10.45	31	21 / 125	▼10
Conservative	Éric Duhaime	125	530,786	▲471,731	12.91	▲11.45			
Green	Alex Tyrrell	73	31,054	▼36,816	0.75	▼0.93			
Canadian	Colin Standish	20	12,981	▲12,981	0.32	New			
Climat Québec	Martine Ouellet	54	8,644	▲8,644	0.21	New			
Bloc Montreal	Balarama Holness	13	7,774	▲7,774	0.19	New			
Democratie directe	Jean Charles Cléroux	28	2,421	▲2,421	0.06	New			
Independent		14	2,121	▼4,341	0.05	▼0.11			
Parti nul	Renaud Blais	9	1,074	▼2,585	0.03	▼0.06			
L'Union fait la force	Georges Samman	9	1,042	▲1,042	0.03	New			
Parti 51	Hans Mercier	5	689	▼428	0.02	▼0.01			
Marxist–Leninist	Pierre Chénier	12	675	▼1,033	0.02	▼0.02			
Équipe Autonomiste	Stéphane Pouleur	10	556	▼582	0.01	▼0.02			
Parti culinaire	Jean-Louis Thémistocle	2	356	▲187	0.01	▲0.01			
Parti humain	Marie-Ève Ouellette	2	262	▲262	0.01	New			
Union Nationale	Jonathan Blanchette	1	159	▲159	–	Returned			
Alliance for family and communities	Alain Rioux	2	148	▲148	–	New			
Libertarian	Charles-Olivier Bolduc	1	116	▲116	–	New			
Access to property and equity	Shawn Lalande McLean	1	70	▲70	–	New			
Total		880	4,112,821		100.00%				
Rejected ballots			56,316	▼9,769					
Turnout			4,169,137	▲69,514	66.15%	▼0.30			
Registered electors			6,302,789	▲133,017					

=== Synopsis of the riding results ===
Results by riding - 2022 Quebec general election
Riding	Winning party								Turnout (Note: including spoilt ballots)	Votes (Note: All parties with more than 1% of the vote, or which obtained at least 1,000 votes in one riding, are shown individually. Independent candidates and other minor parties are aggregated separately. Parties are presented in the order shown on EQ data.)									
Name	2018	1st place	Votes	Share	Margin #	Margin %	2nd place	3rd place	Turnout	CAQ	QS	PQ	PLQ	PCQ	PVQ	PCaQ	Ind	Other	Total
Abitibi-Est	CAQ	CAQ	9,762	47.17%	6,718	32.46%	PLQ	QS	62.57%	9,762	2,838	2,565	3,044	2,486	–	–	–	–	20,695
Abitibi-Ouest	CAQ	CAQ	10,399	46.75%	5,780	25.98%	PQ	QS	63.70%	10,399	3,623	4,619	1,153	2,293	–	–	–	159	22,246
Acadie	PLQ	PLQ	10,981	42.26%	6,513	25.07%	QS	CAQ	53.45%	4,446	4,468	2,565	10,981	2,955	569	–	–	–	25,984
Anjou–Louis-Riel	PLQ	CAQ	9,376	35.56%	1,331	5.05%	PLQ	QS	63.85%	9,376	3,893	2,910	8,045	1,887	–	–	49	203	26,363
Argenteuil	CAQ	CAQ	14,725	45.10%	9,434	28.90%	PQ	PCQ	64.17%	14,725	3,523	5,291	3,325	4,807	429	436	–	113	32,649
Arthabaska	CAQ	CAQ	23,447	51.75%	12,260	27.06%	PCQ	PQ	74.10%	23,447	4,179	4,538	1,702	11,187	–	–	–	256	45,309
Beauce-Nord	CAQ	CAQ	14,590	43.43%	202	0.60%	PCQ	PQ	77.03%	14,590	1,522	1,994	951	14,388	–	–	–	146	33,591
Beauce-Sud	CAQ	CAQ	16,615	44.55%	428	1.15%	PCQ	QS	75.93%	16,615	1,623	1,505	1,057	16,187	–	–	–	306	37,293
Beauharnois	CAQ	CAQ	17,882	53.78%	12,242	36.82%	PQ	QS	66.33%	17,882	4,299	5,640	1,940	3,112	243	–	–	136	33,252
Bellechasse	CAQ	CAQ	15,065	45.74%	3,453	10.48%	PCQ	PQ	73.86%	15,065	1,988	2,908	1,360	11,612	–	–	–	–	32,933
Berthier	CAQ	CAQ	21,256	50.97%	12,574	30.15%	PQ	QS	67.85%	21,256	5,877	8,682	1,064	4,585	–	–	–	242	41,706
Bertrand	CAQ	CAQ	15,927	45.26%	8,668	24.63%	PQ	QS	64.77%	15,927	5,682	7,259	2,115	3,444	448	–	–	313	35,188
Blainville	CAQ	CAQ	21,149	49.45%	14,549	34.02%	PQ	QS	72.12%	21,149	5,987	6,600	4,718	4,175	–	–	–	140	42,769
Bonaventure	PQ	CAQ	9,919	44.45%	3,211	14.39%	PQ	QS	62.76%	9,919	2,417	6,708	1,911	1,219	–	–	–	139	22,313
Borduas	CAQ	CAQ	22,760	51.23%	14,114	31.77%	PQ	QS	74.94%	22,760	6,726	8,646	2,326	3,357	463	–	–	151	44,429
Bourassa-Sauvé	PLQ	PLQ	9,704	40.13%	3,655	15.11%	CAQ	QS	53.46%	6,049	3,737	2,101	9,704	2,161	266	–	94	70	24,182
Brome-Missisquoi	CAQ	CAQ	20,576	45.87%	13,438	29.96%	QS	PQ	67.99%	20,576	7,138	5,359	5,344	4,875	487	642	209	226	44,856
Camille-Laurin	CAQ	PQ	11,959	41.68%	2,794	9.74%	CAQ	PLQ	63.45%	9,165	–	11,959	4,724	1,869	641	–	–	332	28,690
Chambly	CAQ	CAQ	18,500	48.47%	11,669	30.57%	PQ	QS	73.73%	18,500	6,250	6,831	2,997	3,181	–	–	–	411	38,170
Champlain	CAQ	CAQ	23,513	55.89%	16,130	38.34%	PCQ	PQ	70.98%	23,513	3,775	5,065	2,138	7,383	–	–	–	194	42,068
Chapleau	CAQ	CAQ	16,363	52.30%	12,104	38.69%	PLQ	QS	58.78%	16,363	4,129	3,033	4,259	3,161	–	–	–	339	31,284
Charlesbourg	CAQ	CAQ	18,921	45.00%	10,357	24.63%	PCQ	PQ	74.60%	18,921	5,486	5,967	2,518	8,564	348	–	–	238	42,042
Charlevoix–Côte-de-Beaupré	CAQ	CAQ	17,979	48.17%	11,216	30.05%	PCQ	PQ	70.20%	17,979	4,677	6,041	1,756	6,763	–	–	–	106	37,322
Châteauguay	CAQ	CAQ	13,038	39.12%	4,778	14.33%	PLQ	QS	61.98%	13,038	4,261	3,947	8,260	3,363	463	–	–	–	33,332
Chauveau	CAQ	CAQ	20,292	46.84%	6,498	15.00%	PCQ	QS	75.68%	20,292	3,816	3,307	1,651	13,794	–	–	–	458	43,318
Chicoutimi	CAQ	CAQ	19,345	62.28%	14,930	48.06%	PQ	QS	68.73%	19,345	3,741	4,415	943	2,619	–	–	–	–	31,063
Chomedey	PLQ	PLQ	11,895	36.52%	3,199	9.82%	CAQ	PCQ	54.52%	8,696	2,570	2,343	11,895	6,467	311	–	–	290	32,572
Chutes-de-la-Chaudière	CAQ	CAQ	22,055	47.46%	9,415	20.26%	PCQ	PQ	78.91%	22,055	4,311	5,163	2,298	12,640	–	–	–	–	46,467
Côte-du-Sud	CAQ	CAQ	16,116	47.69%	8,206	24.28%	PCQ	PQ	68.46%	16,116	3,154	4,316	2,132	7,910	–	–	–	164	33,792
D'Arcy-McGee	PLQ	PLQ	13,298	51.41%	7,621	29.46%	PCQ	QS	47.49%	1,529	2,203	648	13,298	5,677	547	1,285	–	679	25,866
Deux-Montagnes	CAQ	CAQ	15,854	47.08%	10,077	29.92%	PQ	QS	69.48%	15,854	4,766	5,777	3,460	3,308	317	–	–	193	33,675
Drummond–Bois-Francs	CAQ	CAQ	18,747	51.64%	12,433	34.25%	PCQ	PQ	69.60%	18,747	3,866	5,462	1,455	6,314	367	–	–	91	36,302
Dubuc	CAQ	CAQ	15,427	57.60%	10,728	40.06%	PQ	PCQ	65.05%	15,427	2,833	4,699	666	2,956	–	–	–	200	26,781
Duplessis	PQ	CAQ	8,785	45.14%	3,960	20.35%	PQ	PCQ	53.21%	8,785	1,821	4,825	783	3,059	–	–	–	190	19,463
Fabre	PLQ	CAQ	10,912	31.81%	306	0.89%	PLQ	PCQ	62.55%	10,912	3,820	3,346	10,606	5,205	418	–	–	–	34,307
Gaspé	PQ	CAQ	7,542	41.40%	710	3.90%	PQ	QS	60.96%	7,542	1,634	6,832	1,255	956	–	–	–	–	18,219
Gatineau	CAQ	CAQ	17,055	46.74%	9,918	27.18%	PLQ	QS	58.79%	17,055	4,415	3,542	7,137	3,927	–	327	–	88	36,491
Gouin	QS	QS	17,283	59.44%	13,321	45.81%	PQ	CAQ	69.57%	3,596	17,283	3,962	2,444	903	602	–	–	288	29,078
Granby	CAQ	CAQ	21,515	58.19%	16,233	43.91%	QS	PQ	68.14%	21,515	5,282	4,378	1,758	3,737	263	–	–	38	36,971
Groulx	CAQ	CAQ	17,431	47.75%	11,512	31.53%	QS	PQ	68.51%	17,431	5,919	5,588	4,024	3,177	368	–	–	–	36,507
Hochelaga-Maisonneuve	QS	QS	12,784	50.84%	8,056	32.04%	CAQ	PQ	62.56%	4,728	12,784	4,015	1,957	1,161	337	–	–	162	25,144
Hull	PLQ	CAQ	11,060	34.64%	2,784	8.72%	PLQ	QS	57.94%	11,060	6,623	3,122	8,276	2,189	655	–	–	–	31,925
Huntingdon	CAQ	CAQ	13,664	46.64%	9,450	32.26%	PLQ	PCQ	64.27%	13,664	3,265	3,522	4,214	3,923	367	339	–	–	29,294
Iberville	CAQ	CAQ	18,223	53.15%	12,996	37.90%	PQ	QS	70.23%	18,223	4,703	5,227	1,934	3,863	–	–	–	338	34,288
Îles-de-la-Madeleine	PQ	PQ	3,877	46.35%	539	6.44%	CAQ	PLQ	75.74%	3,338	450	3,877	606	93	–	–	–	–	8,364
Jacques-Cartier	PLQ	PLQ	18,158	62.57%	14,898	51.33%	PCQ	CAQ	63.17%	2,735	1,456	877	18,158	3,260	1,074	1,462	–	–	29,022
Jean-Lesage	QS	QS	11,390	37.77%	1,964	6.51%	CAQ	PCQ	67.34%	9,426	11,390	3,337	1,326	4,258	237	–	–	180	30,154
Jeanne-Mance-Viger	PLQ	PLQ	14,471	53.93%	10,016	37.33%	CAQ	PCQ	55.01%	4,455	2,858	1,122	14,471	3,113	319	496	–	–	26,834
Jean-Talon	PLQ	CAQ	11,105	32.50%	2,988	8.75%	QS	PQ	73.86%	11,105	8,117	6,386	4,616	3,541	262	–	–	137	34,164
Johnson	CAQ	CAQ	21,944	52.50%	15,621	37.37%	PCQ	PQ	67.64%	21,944	5,769	6,024	1,469	6,323	–	–	–	271	41,800
Joliette	PQ	CAQ	17,925	45.58%	5,644	14.35%	PQ	QS	69.76%	17,925	4,476	12,281	1,178	3,470	–	–	–	–	39,330
Jonquière	PQ	CAQ	18,196	59.39%	12,284	40.10%	PQ	PCQ	68.46%	18,196	2,778	5,912	648	2,926	–	–	–	177	30,637
Labelle	CAQ	CAQ	17,662	53.08%	11,296	33.95%	PQ	QS	65.15%	17,662	4,079	6,366	1,679	3,173	–	–	–	313	33,272
Lac-Saint-Jean	CAQ	CAQ	14,798	51.47%	7,431	25.85%	PQ	PCQ	67.18%	14,798	2,178	7,367	867	3,270	–	–	–	272	28,752
LaFontaine	PLQ	PLQ	13,398	51.67%	8,209	31.66%	CAQ	PCQ	62.33%	5,189	2,301	1,322	13,398	3,406	313	–	–	–	25,929
La Peltrie	CAQ	CAQ	19,714	44.35%	6,423	14.45%	PCQ	PQ	73.70%	19,714	3,954	4,415	2,517	13,291	289	–	–	268	44,448
La Pinière	PLQ	PLQ	12,688	38.51%	2,416	7.33%	CAQ	PCQ	59.90%	10,272	3,301	2,577	12,688	3,345	396	371	–	–	32,950
Laporte	PLQ	CAQ	10,361	30.76%	654	1.94%	PLQ	QS	64.04%	10,361	5,968	4,108	9,707	2,488	497	445	–	113	33,687
La Prairie	CAQ	CAQ	18,229	52.71%	13,438	38.86%	PLQ	QS	72.50%	18,229	4,531	3,950	4,791	2,751	–	–	–	331	34,583
L'Assomption	CAQ	CAQ	18,637	58.63%	14,084	44.30%	QS	PQ	70.75%	18,637	4,553	4,370	1,806	2,424	–	–	–	–	31,790
Laurier-Dorion	QS	QS	13,323	48.80%	7,979	29.22%	PLQ	CAQ	61.62%	3,203	13,323	2,800	5,344	1,512	332	–	–	789	27,303
Laval-des-Rapides	PLQ	CAQ	10,599	31.90%	1,053	3.17%	PLQ	QS	61.48%	10,599	5,542	4,293	9,546	2,852	398	–	–	–	33,230
Laviolette–Saint-Maurice	CAQ	CAQ	19,418	51.72%	13,131	34.98%	PCQ	PQ	64.04%	19,418	3,568	6,010	1,875	6,287	–	–	137	248	37,543
Les Plaines	CAQ	CAQ	13,922	50.54%	9,478	34.41%	PQ	QS	67.59%	13,922	3,668	4,444	1,895	3,333	282	–	–	–	27,544
Lévis	CAQ	CAQ	18,051	48.79%	10,374	28.04%	PCQ	PQ	73.73%	18,051	4,244	4,775	1,899	7,677	213	–	–	138	36,997
Lotbinière-Frontenac	CAQ	CAQ	18,330	43.72%	4,827	11.51%	PCQ	QS	73.86%	18,330	3,925	3,688	2,483	13,503	–	–	–	–	41,929
Louis-Hébert	CAQ	CAQ	17,803	47.21%	11,575	30.69%	PQ	PCQ	81.09%	17,803	4,537	6,228	3,283	5,509	285	–	–	65	37,710
Marguerite-Bourgeoys	PLQ	PLQ	12,635	44.78%	6,102	21.63%	CAQ	PCQ	54.71%	6,533	2,898	1,966	12,635	3,103	409	–	–	672	28,216
Marie-Victorin	PQ	CAQ	9,212	33.11%	2,299	8.26%	PQ	QS	61.64%	9,212	6,307	6,913	2,793	1,952	308	–	–	335	27,820
Marquette	PLQ	PLQ	12,255	46.73%	6,533	24.91%	CAQ	QS	58.32%	5,722	2,956	2,114	12,255	2,395	682	–	100	–	26,224
Maskinongé	CAQ	CAQ	17,096	53.50%	11,965	37.45%	PCQ	PQ	70.57%	17,096	3,162	4,519	1,619	5,131	227	–	69	130	31,953
Masson	CAQ	CAQ	18,195	51.60%	11,763	33.36%	PQ	QS	71.16%	18,195	4,610	6,432	2,723	2,972	332	–	–	–	35,264
Matane-Matapédia	PQ	PQ	20,057	67.43%	14,894	50.07%	CAQ	PCQ	64.93%	5,163	1,450	20,057	637	2,316	–	–	–	123	29,746
Maurice-Richard	PLQ	QS	10,903	34.67%	2,361	7.51%	CAQ	PLQ	68.36%	8,542	10,903	4,612	5,414	1,322	311	–	115	228	31,447
Mégantic	CAQ	CAQ	12,973	46.17%	6,721	23.92%	PCQ	QS	70.39%	12,973	3,592	3,588	1,604	6,252	–	–	–	89	28,098
Mercier	QS	QS	14,755	53.92%	10,769	39.36%	PQ	PLQ	63.62%	2,814	14,755	3,986	3,837	1,051	818	–	–	102	27,363
Mille-Îles	PLQ	PLQ	9,522	32.38%	425	1.45%	CAQ	QS	66.98%	9,097	3,789	3,551	9,522	3,105	346	–	–	–	29,410
Mirabel	CAQ	CAQ	21,639	50.11%	14,393	33.33%	PQ	QS	68.98%	21,639	6,222	7,246	2,918	4,936	–	–	–	223	43,184
Montarville	CAQ	CAQ	19,045	45.90%	11,292	27.22%	PQ	QS	78.55%	19,045	6,741	7,753	5,090	2,124	601	–	–	134	41,488
Montmorency	CAQ	CAQ	19,124	45.18%	8,093	19.12%	PCQ	QS	73.94%	19,124	5,100	4,773	1,969	11,031	274	–	–	55	42,326
Mont-Royal–Outremont	PLQ	PLQ	11,658	39.35%	5,650	19.07%	QS	CAQ	53.70%	4,677	6,008	3,385	11,658	2,522	785	507	–	87	29,629
Nelligan	PLQ	PLQ	17,454	52.03%	11,870	35.38%	CAQ	PCQ	58.76%	5,584	1,766	1,399	17,454	5,061	558	1,014	–	710	33,546
Nicolet-Bécancour	CAQ	CAQ	13,956	47.05%	7,361	24.82%	PCQ	PQ	72.52%	13,956	2,610	5,095	1,406	6,595	–	–	–	–	29,662
Notre-Dame-de-Grâce	PLQ	PLQ	12,918	50.46%	8,951	34.96%	QS	PCQ	55.76%	1,877	3,967	1,302	12,918	2,087	956	723	–	1,772 (Note: Balarama Holness of Bloc Montreal receuved 1,701 votes.)	25,602
Orford	CAQ	CAQ	14,084	42.95%	8,786	26.79%	QS	PLQ	71.19%	14,084	5,298	4,463	4,917	3,567	–	354	–	109	32,792
Papineau	CAQ	CAQ	19,791	52.83%	14,627	39.04%	QS	PCQ	59.44%	19,791	5,164	3,834	3,151	4,970	450	–	–	104	37,464
Pointe-aux-Trembles	CAQ	CAQ	12,156	45.88%	6,891	26.01%	PQ	QS	66.33%	12,156	4,084	5,265	2,750	1,804	268	–	–	168	26,495
Pontiac	PLQ	PLQ	12,477	43.68%	5,421	18.98%	CAQ	PCQ	53.50%	7,056	2,935	1,887	12,477	3,118	616	475	–	–	28,564
Portneuf	CAQ	CAQ	15,412	47.38%	5,737	17.64%	PCQ	PQ	73.29%	15,412	2,675	3,203	916	9,675	–	–	608	40	32,529
Prévost	CAQ	CAQ	15,903	46.23%	9,166	26.64%	PQ	QS	69.37%	15,903	5,196	6,737	2,072	4,019	374	–	–	100	34,401
René-Lévesque	PQ	CAQ	11,377	58.92%	7,290	37.75%	PQ	PCQ	59.93%	11,377	1,459	4,087	307	1,955	–	–	42	82	19,309
Repentigny	CAQ	CAQ	19,747	52.36%	13,061	34.63%	PQ	QS	73.24%	19,747	4,783	6,686	3,758	2,419	–	–	–	321	37,714
Richelieu	CAQ	CAQ	17,098	55.89%	10,894	35.61%	PQ	QS	67.81%	17,098	3,084	6,204	1,262	2,697	–	–	–	247	30,592
Richmond	CAQ	CAQ	21,255	46.75%	12,224	26.89%	QS	PCQ	72.10%	21,255	9,031	5,803	2,476	6,683	–	–	105	112	45,465
Rimouski	PQ	CAQ	13,761	41.75%	4,321	13.11%	PQ	QS	71.60%	13,761	7,042	9,440	992	1,566	–	–	–	159	32,960
Rivière-du-Loup–Témiscouata	CAQ	CAQ	18,183	52.06%	12,042	34.48%	PQ	QS	68.89%	18,183	5,102	6,141	1,388	3,937	–	–	–	174	34,925
Robert-Baldwin	PLQ	PLQ	17,228	57.76%	12,449	41.74%	PCQ	CAQ	55.80%	2,909	1,498	776	17,228	4,779	614	1,231	–	792	29,827
Roberval	PLQ	CAQ	15,017	56.19%	9,529	35.65%	PQ	PCQ	60.78%	15,017	1,826	5,488	1,217	3,038	–	–	–	141	26,727
Rosemont	QS	QS	13,311	37.62%	5,154	14.57%	CAQ	PQ	68.22%	8,157	13,311	7,527	4,170	1,605	452	–	–	158	35,380
Rousseau	CAQ	CAQ	14,117	50.58%	9,132	32.72%	PQ	PCQ	61.49%	14,117	3,667	4,985	963	4,180	–	–	–	–	27,912
Rouyn-Noranda-Témiscamingue	QS	CAQ	12,975	45.16%	4,085	14.22%	QS	PQ	64.91%	12,975	8,890	3,232	1,255	2,202	178	–	–	–	28,732
Sainte-Marie-Saint-Jacques	QS	QS	10,892	47.69%	7,271	31.83%	PLQ	PQ	56.23%	3,268	10,892	3,362	3,621	1,138	450	–	–	110	22,841
Sainte-Rose	CAQ	CAQ	14,091	38.50%	5,313	14.52%	PLQ	QS	67.56%	14,091	5,243	4,536	8,778	3,429	304	–	–	219	36,600
Saint-François	CAQ	CAQ	17,280	42.43%	5,789	14.21%	QS	PCQ	69.45%	17,280	11,491	3,712	3,220	4,483	–	285	–	257	40,728
Saint-Henri-Sainte-Anne	PLQ	PLQ	11,728	36.15%	2,736	8.43%	QS	CAQ	57.82%	5,751	8,992	2,683	11,728	2,063	620	–	–	603	32,440
Saint-Hyacinthe	CAQ	CAQ	22,487	54.42%	15,587	37.72%	PQ	QS	70.47%	22,487	5,636	6,900	1,705	4,066	217	–	142	168	41,321
Saint-Jean	CAQ	CAQ	21,734	50.65%	13,486	31.43%	PQ	QS	69.73%	21,734	6,334	8,248	2,565	3,603	–	–	–	423	42,907
Saint-Jérôme	CAQ	CAQ	20,527	50.02%	12,800	31.19%	PQ	QS	65.17%	20,527	6,411	7,727	1,858	3,998	517	–	–	–	41,038
Saint-Laurent	PLQ	PLQ	14,304	49.97%	10,213	35.67%	CAQ	PCQ	50.96%	4,091	2,840	1,696	14,304	3,973	439	533	–	752	28,628
Sanguinet	CAQ	CAQ	14,607	48.78%	9,725	32.48%	PQ	QS	69.81%	14,607	3,925	4,882	2,952	3,164	325	–	–	89	29,944
Sherbrooke	QS	QS	15,548	41.91%	2,472	6.66%	CAQ	PQ	70.82%	13,076	15,548	3,373	2,166	2,501	204	–	–	230	37,098
Soulanges	CAQ	CAQ	17,114	42.62%	8,353	20.80%	PLQ	PCQ	67.37%	17,114	4,353	4,124	8,761	5,006	795	–	–	–	40,153
Taillon	CAQ	CAQ	14,635	41.51%	7,475	21.20%	PQ	QS	67.66%	14,635	6,663	7,160	4,096	2,280	–	–	–	422	35,256
Taschereau	QS	QS	13,588	39.53%	5,831	16.97%	PQ	CAQ	72.28%	7,537	13,588	7,757	2,025	3,012	225	–	83	143	34,370
Terrebonne	CAQ	CAQ	20,911	49.44%	12,925	30.56%	PQ	QS	71.19%	20,911	5,352	7,986	4,301	3,357	308	–	–	80	42,295
Trois-Rivières	CAQ	CAQ	18,859	50.81%	12,790	34.46%	QS	PQ	68.72%	18,859	6,069	5,323	2,056	4,552	–	–	–	256	37,115
Ungava	CAQ	CAQ	3,132	36.27%	1,040	12.04%	QS	PLQ	30.21%	3,132	2,092	1,084	1,571	756	–	–	–	–	8,635
Vachon	CAQ	CAQ	15,984	44.91%	10,266	28.85%	PLQ	QS	68.37%	15,984	5,343	4,757	5,718	3,166	404	–	–	217	35,589
Vanier-Les Rivières	CAQ	CAQ	20,812	47.39%	12,240	27.87%	PCQ	PQ	73.54%	20,812	5,337	5,741	2,760	8,572	266	–	282	148	43,918
Vaudreuil	PLQ	PLQ	13,608	34.22%	576	1.45%	CAQ	PCQ	65.19%	13,032	3,671	3,061	13,608	4,619	496	726	–	552	39,765
Verchères	CAQ	CAQ	23,672	51.28%	14,111	30.57%	PQ	QS	75.28%	23,672	6,665	9,561	2,438	3,269	318	–	86	152	46,161
Verdun	PLQ	QS	9,562	30.75%	461	1.48%	PLQ	CAQ	64.52%	7,150	9,562	2,591	9,101	1,664	542	301	–	182	31,093
Viau	PLQ	PLQ	8,049	38.18%	1,631	7.74%	QS	CAQ	54.03%	3,201	6,418	1,598	8,049	1,294	342	–	–	180	21,082
Vimont	PLQ	CAQ	10,957	34.28%	1,416	4.43%	PLQ	PCQ	69.97%	10,957	3,669	3,379	9,541	4,118	301	–	–	–	31,965
Westmount-Saint-Louis	PLQ	PLQ	10,576	50.48%	7,889	37.65%	QS	CAQ	44.99%	2,112	2,687	1,267	10,576	1,930	616	1,029	–	735	20,952

= open seat
= turnout is above provincial average
= winning candidate was in previous Legislature
= incumbent had switched allegiance
= previously incumbent in another riding
= not incumbent; was previously elected to the Legislature
= incumbency arose from byelection gain
= other incumbents renominated
= previously an MP in the House of Commons of Canada
= multiple candidates

=== Comparative analysis for ridings (2022 vs 2018) ===
==== Analytical charts ====
Ternary plots of election results
2018

2022
Electoral districts won identified by CAQ (blue), Liberal (red), Québec solidaire (orange) and PQ (cyan).
2022 vs 2018

2022 (by winning party)
2022 vs 2018

2022 (by party finishing second)
2022 vs 2018

2022
2022 vs 2018

2022 (by winning party)

==== Turnout, winning shares and swings ====
Summary of riding results by turnout, vote share for winning candidate, and swing (vs 2018) (Note: Drawn from "Data archives". www.dgeq.org. Élections Québec.)
Riding and winning party			Turnout		Vote share (Note: Share won by winning candidate, with difference noted from share achieved by the same party in 2018.)		Swing (Note: Positive indicates improvement to standing of party winning in 2018; negative points to 2018's second-place party being swung to.)
Riding and winning party			%	Change (pp)	%	Change (pp)	Change (pp)
Abitibi-Est	CAQ	Hold	62.57	-1.22	47.17	4.45	5.77
Abitibi-Ouest	CAQ	Hold	63.70	-1.05	46.75	12.63	12.57
Acadie	PLQ	Hold	53.45	-0.72	42.26	-11.54	-6.07
Anjou–Louis-Riel	CAQ	Gain	63.85	-0.64	35.56	6.65	-7.60
Argenteuil	CAQ	Hold	64.17	-1.16	45.10	6.23	5.58
Arthabaska	CAQ	Hold	74.10	4.61	51.75	-10.09	-3.37
Beauce-Nord	CAQ	Hold	77.03	6.24	43.43	-22.94	-5.06
Beauce-Sud	CAQ	Hold	75.93	6.80	44.55	-18.13	-0.06
Beauharnois	CAQ	Hold	66.33	-2.29	53.78	7.07	5.99
Bellechasse	CAQ	Hold	73.86	3.76	45.74	-8.10	7.46
Berthier	CAQ	Hold	67.85	-1.99	50.97	5.84	6.97
Bertrand	CAQ	Hold	64.77	-2.83	45.26	3.72	3.25
Blainville	CAQ	Hold	72.12	-2.44	49.45	1.18	4.61
Bonaventure	CAQ	Gain	62.76	0.49	44.45	28.45	4.29
Borduas	CAQ	Hold	74.94	-1.47	51.23	3.45	2.70
Bourassa-Sauvé	PLQ	Hold	53.46	1.02	40.13	-6.03	-3.78
Brome-Missisquoi	CAQ	Hold	67.99	-2.76	45.87	1.49	6.89
Camille-Laurin	PQ	Gain	63.45	-1.47	41.68	15.67	-5.65
Chambly	CAQ	Hold	73.73	-1.62	48.47	-1.79	-1.14
Champlain	CAQ	Hold	70.98	0.50	55.89	4.03	8.81
Chapleau	CAQ	Hold	58.78	-1.00	52.30	11.88	15.42
Charlesbourg	CAQ	Hold	74.60	1.23	45.00	-3.12	6.66
Charlevoix–Côte-de-Beaupré	CAQ	Hold	70.20	1.72	48.17	2.80	10.38
Châteauguay	CAQ	Hold	75.68	4.88	39.12	2.06	5.48
Chauveau	CAQ	Hold	68.73	0.20	46.84	-0.22	9.22
Chicoutimi	CAQ	Hold	54.52	0.50	62.28	23.02	16.89
Chomedey	PLQ	Hold	78.91	2.28	36.52	-16.16	-8.23
Chutes-de-la-Chaudière	CAQ	Hold	61.98	-1.88	47.46	-12.05	-1.53
Côte-du-Sud	CAQ	Hold	68.46	1.63	47.69	-5.95	4.87
D'Arcy-McGee	PLQ	Hold	47.49	0.93	51.41	-22.90	-12.09
Deux-Montagnes	CAQ	Hold	69.48	-1.62	47.08	-0.36	0.80
Drummond–Bois-Francs	CAQ	Hold	69.60	0.78	51.64	-4.66	-0.15
Dubuc	CAQ	Hold	65.05	-0.80	57.60	17.38	18.63
Duplessis	CAQ	Gain	53.21	-2.60	45.14	11.44	-10.49
Fabre	CAQ	Gain	62.55	1.32	31.81	-0.75	-2.93
Gaspé	CAQ	Gain	60.96	0.14	41.40	21.80	15.19
Gatineau	CAQ	Hold	58.79	-0.99	46.74	5.00	7.97
Gouin	QS	Hold	69.57	-0.05	59.44	0.30	0.77
Granby	CAQ	Hold	68.14	-1.68	58.19	-4.18	-2.23
Groulx	CAQ	Hold	68.51	-1.74	47.75	7.13	8.19
Hochelaga-Maisonneuve	QS	Hold	62.56	-0.84	50.84	0.79	4.21
Hull	CAQ	Gain	57.94	0.32	34.64	8.20	-8.02
Huntingdon	CAQ	Hold	64.27	-3.33	46.64	8.96	14.90
Iberville	CAQ	Hold	70.23	-0.65	53.15	5.53	3.92
Îles-de-la-Madeleine	PQ	Hold	63.17	-1.94	46.35	7.70	19.46
Jacques-Cartier	PLQ	Hold	67.34	1.56	62.57	-9.24	-4.67
Jean-Lesage	QS	Hold	73.86	-1.30	37.77	3.07	2.08
Jean-Talon	CAQ	Gain	55.01	-0.26	32.50	3.93	-11.50
Jeanne-Mance-Viger	PLQ	Hold	67.64	0.17	53.93	-12.40	-6.41
Johnson	CAQ	Hold	69.76	-2.17	52.50	-0.46	1.81
Joliette	CAQ	Gain	68.46	-0.79	45.58	10.93	-12.97
Jonquière	CAQ	Gain	70.75	-1.20	59.39	26.92	-27.99
L'Assomption	CAQ	Hold	73.70	2.93	58.63	1.60	2.12
La Peltrie	CAQ	Hold	59.90	-1.19	44.35	-13.37	-1.22
La Pinière	PLQ	Hold	72.50	-2.35	38.51	-8.56	-5.45
La Prairie	CAQ	Hold	62.33	3.30	52.71	9.57	9.86
Labelle	CAQ	Hold	65.15	-2.05	53.08	16.59	16.05
Lac-Saint-Jean	CAQ	Hold	67.18	-1.50	51.47	12.00	8.96
LaFontaine	PLQ	Hold	64.04	-2.25	51.67	-7.13	-2.62
Laporte	CAQ	Gain	61.62	-1.97	30.76	2.20	-4.50
Laurier-Dorion	QS	Hold	61.48	-0.20	48.80	1.52	5.81
Laval-des-Rapides	CAQ	Gain	64.04	0.23	31.90	1.17	-1.99
Laviolette–Saint-Maurice	CAQ	Hold	67.59	-1.46	51.72	6.31	11.05
Les Plaines	CAQ	Hold	73.86	4.41	50.54	-0.67	3.45
Lévis	CAQ	Hold	81.09	0.57	48.79	-8.50	0.42
Lotbinière-Frontenac	CAQ	Hold	73.73	2.33	43.72	-10.07	2.24
Louis-Hébert	CAQ	Hold	54.71	-0.09	47.21	2.62	10.27
Marguerite-Bourgeoys	PLQ	Hold	61.64	-1.27	44.78	-8.61	-4.14
Marie-Victorin	CAQ	Gain	58.32	-1.29	33.11	4.72	-5.35
Marquette	PLQ	Hold	70.57	-1.01	46.73	3.74	5.13
Maskinongé	CAQ	Hold	71.16	-1.70	53.50	11.08	16.96
Masson	CAQ	Hold	64.93	-0.45	51.60	-1.45	0.01
Matane-Matapédia	PQ	Hold	68.36	-0.27	67.43	-2.03	-4.02
Maurice-Richard	QS	Gain	63.62	-1.94	34.67	6.81	-9.56
Mégantic	CAQ	Hold	66.98	0.51	46.17	-1.36	6.39
Mercier	QS	Hold	68.98	-1.71	53.92	-0.58	1.56
Mille-Îles	PLQ	Hold	53.70	-2.01	32.38	-3.44	-1.35
Mirabel	CAQ	Hold	78.55	-1.82	50.11	-4.52	-1.60
Mont-Royal–Outremont	PLQ	Hold	73.94	2.98	39.35	-11.99	-8.42
Montarville	CAQ	Hold	70.39	1.24	45.90	4.80	8.45
Montmorency	CAQ	Hold	58.76	-0.82	45.18	-5.69	4.13
Nelligan	PLQ	Hold	72.52	0.75	52.03	-13.09	-6.29
Nicolet-Bécancour	CAQ	Hold	55.76	-0.38	47.05	-8.24	-4.86
Notre-Dame-de-Grâce	PLQ	Hold	71.19	0.47	50.46	-12.53	-8.09
Orford	CAQ	Hold	59.44	-1.44	42.95	2.89	6.43
Papineau	CAQ	Hold	66.33	-1.10	52.83	5.89	10.30
Pointe-aux-Trembles	CAQ	Hold	53.50	-0.03	45.88	6.92	9.63
Pontiac	PLQ	Hold	73.29	2.98	43.68	-10.21	-7.25
Portneuf	CAQ	Hold	69.37	-1.43	47.38	-6.93	4.57
Prévost	CAQ	Hold	59.93	1.18	46.23	-0.80	2.05
René-Lévesque	CAQ	Gain	73.24	-0.97	58.92	25.21	-23.13
Repentigny	CAQ	Hold	67.81	-2.62	52.36	2.62	1.84
Richelieu	CAQ	Hold	72.10	-0.01	55.89	6.10	4.44
Richmond	CAQ	Hold	71.60	1.35	46.75	7.11	10.74
Rimouski	CAQ	Gain	68.89	-0.52	41.75	16.85	-16.07
Rivière-du-Loup–Témiscouata	CAQ	Hold	55.80	0.20	52.06	12.88	21.19
Robert-Baldwin	PLQ	Hold	60.78	-2.61	57.76	-16.10	-7.26
Roberval	CAQ	Gain	68.22	-1.18	56.19	32.03	-34.97
Rosemont	QS	Hold	61.49	-4.66	37.62	2.37	4.77
Rousseau	CAQ	Hold	64.91	-0.69	50.58	-2.66	2.92
Rouyn-Noranda-Témiscamingue	CAQ	Gain	69.45	0.30	45.16	14.83	-7.99
Saint-François	CAQ	Hold	57.82	1.21	42.43	7.70	11.55
Saint-Henri-Sainte-Anne	PLQ	Hold	70.47	-0.99	36.15	-1.91	-2.90
Saint-Hyacinthe	CAQ	Hold	69.73	-1.55	54.42	2.42	2.75
Saint-Jean	CAQ	Hold	65.17	-0.70	50.65	11.15	11.46
Saint-Jérôme	CAQ	Hold	50.96	0.00	50.02	6.28	7.44
Saint-Laurent	PLQ	Hold	56.23	-3.19	49.97	-12.00	-5.57
Sainte-Marie-Saint-Jacques	QS	Hold	67.56	-2.45	47.69	-1.59	1.86
Sainte-Rose	CAQ	Hold	69.81	-2.64	38.50	1.66	3.90
Sanguinet	CAQ	Hold	70.82	-0.69	48.78	5.24	6.86
Sherbrooke	QS	Hold	67.37	-2.96	41.91	7.64	13.24
Soulanges	CAQ	Hold	67.66	-1.46	42.62	3.39	7.66
Taillon	CAQ	Hold	72.28	-1.46	41.51	7.75	7.76
Taschereau	QS	Hold	71.19	-1.15	39.53	-2.98	-2.97
Terrebonne	CAQ	Hold	68.72	-1.50	49.44	6.48	8.54
Trois-Rivières	CAQ	Hold	30.21	-0.68	50.81	9.74	13.52
Ungava	CAQ	Hold	68.37	-2.49	36.27	9.76	11.59
Vachon	CAQ	Hold	73.54	1.72	44.91	1.30	3.13
Vanier-Les Rivières	CAQ	Hold	65.19	-0.51	47.39	2.28	10.79
Vaudreuil	PLQ	Hold	75.28	-2.10	34.22	-5.70	-2.92
Verchères	CAQ	Hold	64.52	1.33	51.28	13.79	14.38
Verdun	QS	Gain	54.03	0.59	30.75	6.80	-6.52
Viau	PLQ	Hold	69.97	0.82	38.18	-8.45	-7.28
Vimont	CAQ	Gain	44.99	-3.48	34.28	-0.59	-3.13
Westmount-Saint-Louis	PLQ	Hold	75.74	3.08	50.48	-16.24	-9.40

==== Changes in party shares ====
Share change analysis by party and riding (2022 vs 2018)
Riding	CAQ		QS		PQ		PLQ		PCQ	
Riding	%	Change (pp)	%	Change (pp)	%	Change (pp)	%	Change (pp)	%	Change (pp)
Abitibi-Est	47.17	4.45	13.71	-1.95	12.39	-7.09	14.71	-4.04	12.01	12.01
Abitibi-Ouest	46.75	12.63	16.29	-0.30	20.76	-12.50	5.18	-6.13	10.31	9.21
Acadie	17.11	0.60	17.20	3.45	9.87	0.87	42.26	-11.54	11.37	9.19
Anjou-Louis-Riel	35.56	6.65	14.77	0.24	11.04	-3.66	30.52	-8.54	7.16	7.16
Argenteuil	45.10	6.22	10.79	-1.38	16.21	-4.93	10.18	-7.23	14.72	13.17
Arthabaska	51.75	-10.09	9.22	-3.36	10.02	0.62	3.76	-7.59	24.69	22.36
Beauce-Nord	43.43	-22.94	4.53	-2.53	5.94	0.82	2.83	-12.83	42.83	38.15
Beauce-Sud	44.55	-18.13	4.35	-1.44	4.04	-0.07	2.83	-18.00	43.40	40.92
Beauharnois	53.78	7.08	12.93	-2.12	16.96	-4.90	5.83	-6.88	9.36	8.46
Bellechasse	45.74	-8.11	6.04	-1.46	8.83	1.57	4.13	-23.03	35.26	32.04
Berthier	50.97	5.84	14.09	-1.34	20.82	-8.10	2.55	-5.08	10.99	10.99
Bertrand	45.26	3.71	16.15	-1.97	20.63	-2.78	6.01	-7.39	9.79	9.01
Blainville	49.45	1.18	14.00	-1.12	15.43	1.88	11.03	-8.04	9.76	9.76
Bonaventure	44.45	28.45	10.83	-4.17	30.06	-8.40	8.56	-16.97	5.46	5.46
Borduas	51.23	3.45	15.14	-0.51	19.46	-1.94	5.24	-6.24	7.56	6.90
Bourassa-Sauvé	25.01	1.53	15.45	1.47	8.69	-1.95	40.13	-6.03	8.94	7.48
Brome-Missisquoi	45.87	1.49	15.91	-1.37	11.95	1.23	11.91	-12.29	10.87	10.87
Camille-Laurin	31.94	4.37	–	-24.44	41.68	15.67	16.47	-2.41	6.51	6.51
Chambly	48.47	-1.79	16.37	-0.02	17.90	0.48	7.85	-4.35	8.33	7.51
Champlain	55.89	4.03	8.97	-3.99	12.04	-0.04	5.08	-13.58	17.55	15.75
Chapleau	52.30	11.88	13.20	-2.66	9.70	0.65	13.61	-18.96	10.10	8.56
Charlesbourg	45.00	-3.13	13.05	-0.47	14.19	2.47	5.99	-16.45	20.37	16.69
Charlevoix-Côte-de-Beaupré	48.17	2.80	12.53	-0.34	16.19	-1.12	4.70	-17.96	18.12	18.12
Châteauguay	39.12	2.06	12.78	-0.03	11.84	-0.42	24.78	-8.89	10.09	8.71
Chauveau	46.84	-0.22	8.81	-1.54	7.63	-1.57	3.81	-18.66	31.84	23.23
Chicoutimi	62.28	23.02	12.04	-0.84	14.21	-10.75	3.04	-16.70	8.43	7.05
Chomedey	26.70	0.29	7.89	0.82	7.19	-0.39	36.52	-16.16	19.85	16.28
Chutes-de-la-Chaudière	47.46	-12.05	9.28	-2.15	11.11	1.75	4.95	-8.99	27.20	22.92
Côte-du-Sud	47.69	-5.95	9.33	-1.52	12.77	2.66	6.31	-15.68	23.41	21.66
D'Arcy-McGee	5.91	-0.49	8.52	1.27	2.51	-0.05	51.41	-22.91	21.95	17.46
Deux-Montagnes	47.08	-0.36	14.15	-0.38	17.16	-1.96	10.27	-3.11	9.82	8.73
Drummond-Bois-Francs	51.64	-4.66	10.65	-4.36	15.05	2.51	4.01	-9.01	17.39	15.28
Dubuc	57.60	17.37	10.58	-1.50	17.55	-3.61	2.49	-19.88	11.04	8.58
Duplessis	45.14	11.44	9.36	-3.02	24.79	-9.53	4.02	-13.90	15.72	14.04
Fabre	31.81	-0.75	11.13	0.36	9.75	-3.75	30.91	-6.61	15.17	13.04
Gaspé	41.40	21.80	8.97	-4.84	37.50	4.09	6.89	-26.29	5.25	5.25
Gatineau	46.74	5.00	12.10	-0.83	9.71	0.70	19.56	-10.93	10.76	8.77
Gouin	12.37	2.47	59.44	0.30	13.63	-1.25	8.40	-3.06	3.11	3.11
Granby	58.19	-4.19	14.29	0.26	11.84	2.19	4.76	-5.97	10.11	9.12
Groulx	47.75	7.14	16.21	-1.02	15.31	-0.49	11.02	-9.24	8.70	7.69
Hochelaga-Maisonneuve	18.80	5.91	50.84	0.79	15.97	-7.62	7.78	-2.56	4.62	4.01
Hull	34.64	8.20	20.75	2.25	9.78	-3.82	25.92	-7.84	6.86	5.40
Huntingdon	46.64	8.95	11.15	-1.57	12.02	0.99	14.39	-20.84	13.39	12.02
Iberville	53.15	5.53	13.72	-3.60	15.24	-2.31	5.64	-6.66	11.27	9.52
Îles-de-la-Madeleine	39.91	30.57	5.38	-8.17	46.35	7.70	7.25	-31.21	1.11	1.11
Jacques-Cartier	9.42	0.10	5.02	0.63	3.02	0.25	62.57	-9.24	11.23	8.64
Jean-Lesage	31.26	-1.09	37.77	3.07	11.07	1.75	4.40	-13.52	14.12	12.37
Jean-Talon	32.50	3.93	23.76	4.58	18.69	4.23	13.51	-19.07	10.36	8.54
Jeanne-Mance-Viger	16.60	0.42	10.65	2.50	4.18	-1.37	53.93	-12.39	11.60	10.18
Johnson	52.50	-0.46	13.80	-4.07	14.41	1.25	3.51	-7.54	15.13	13.53
Joliette	45.58	10.93	11.38	1.23	31.23	-15.00	3.00	-3.85	8.82	8.82
Jonquière	59.39	26.92	9.07	1.79	19.30	-29.05	2.12	-7.72	9.55	8.46
L'Assomption	58.63	1.60	14.32	-2.64	13.75	-0.71	5.68	-2.32	7.63	7.08
La Peltrie	44.35	-13.38	8.90	-0.97	9.93	2.40	5.66	-10.95	29.90	25.15
La Pinière	31.17	2.34	10.02	-0.02	7.82	-1.06	38.51	-8.56	10.15	8.83
La Prairie	52.71	9.57	13.10	0.13	11.42	-4.31	13.85	-10.14	7.95	6.82
Labelle	53.08	16.58	12.26	-3.08	19.13	-15.51	5.05	-5.86	9.54	8.72
Lac-Saint-Jean	51.47	12.01	7.58	-7.27	25.62	-5.91	3.02	-9.51	11.37	10.43
LaFontaine	20.01	-1.90	8.87	0.02	5.10	-3.25	51.67	-7.13	13.14	11.38
Laporte	30.76	2.20	17.72	0.62	12.19	-1.03	28.82	-6.79	7.39	6.04
Laurier-Dorion	11.73	2.88	48.80	1.52	10.26	2.47	19.57	-10.09	5.54	4.36
Laval-des-Rapides	31.90	1.17	16.68	-0.28	12.92	-2.48	28.73	-2.81	8.58	7.51
Laviolette-Saint-Maurice	51.72	6.31	9.50	-5.62	16.01	0.34	4.99	-15.79	16.75	14.97
Les Plaines	50.54	-0.68	13.32	-0.53	16.13	-7.58	6.88	-1.13	12.10	11.01
Lévis	48.79	-8.50	11.47	-0.27	12.91	2.66	5.13	-9.33	20.75	18.00
Lotbinière-Frontenac	43.72	-10.06	9.36	-0.13	8.80	-0.69	5.92	-14.53	32.20	28.48
Louis-Hébert	47.21	2.62	12.03	0.97	16.52	4.09	8.71	-17.91	14.61	12.30
Marguerite-Bourgeoys	23.15	-0.33	10.27	-0.49	6.97	-1.48	44.78	-8.61	11.00	11.00
Marie-Victorin	33.11	4.72	22.67	1.00	24.85	-5.97	10.04	-5.17	7.02	7.02
Marquette	21.82	-6.52	11.27	-0.20	8.06	0.28	46.73	3.74	9.13	6.95
Maskinongé	53.50	11.08	9.90	-2.20	14.14	1.33	5.07	-22.83	16.06	14.57
Masson	51.60	-1.45	13.07	-0.37	18.24	-1.47	7.72	-3.17	8.43	7.64
Matane-Matapédia	17.36	6.00	4.87	-0.91	67.43	-2.03	2.14	-9.13	7.79	7.26
Maurice-Richard	27.16	7.41	34.67	6.81	14.67	-4.46	17.22	-12.30	4.20	4.20
Mégantic	46.17	-1.36	12.78	-3.18	12.77	0.22	5.71	-14.13	22.25	22.25
Mercier	10.28	2.24	53.92	-0.58	14.57	2.44	14.02	-3.69	3.84	3.42
Mille-Îles	30.93	-0.74	12.88	0.11	12.07	-3.00	32.38	-3.44	10.56	10.56
Mirabel	50.11	-4.52	14.41	-0.55	16.78	-1.33	6.76	-2.16	11.43	10.68
Mont-Royal-Outremont	15.79	2.28	20.28	4.84	11.42	-0.34	39.35	-11.99	8.51	6.88
Montarville	45.90	4.79	16.25	0.35	18.69	2.55	12.27	-12.10	5.12	5.12
Montmorency	45.18	-5.69	12.05	-1.09	11.28	0.67	4.65	-13.95	26.06	22.27
Nelligan	16.65	-0.52	5.26	-0.26	4.17	-0.42	52.03	-13.09	15.09	12.08
Nicolet-Bécancour	47.05	-8.24	8.8	-3.54	17.18	1.47	4.74	-7.83	22.23	20.18
Notre-Dame-de-Grâce	7.33	-0.68	15.49	3.65	5.09	-0.37	50.46	-12.52	8.15	6.64
Orford	42.95	2.90	16.16	-1.71	13.61	1.23	14.99	-9.96	10.88	9.74
Papineau	52.83	5.90	13.78	-1.24	10.23	-0.35	8.41	-14.70	13.27	11.99
Pointe-aux-Trembles	45.88	6.92	15.41	0.55	19.87	-12.33	10.38	-2.18	6.81	6.81
Pontiac	24.70	4.29	10.28	-0.46	6.61	1.10	43.68	-10.21	10.92	7.83
Portneuf	47.38	-6.93	8.22	-3.20	9.85	0.59	2.82	-16.06	29.74	24.57
Prévost	46.23	-0.80	15.10	1.14	19.58	-4.89	6.02	-6.83	11.68	10.72
René-Lévesque	58.92	25.21	7.56	-2.65	21.17	-21.05	1.59	-11.20	10.12	9.05
Repentigny	52.36	2.62	12.68	-2.19	17.73	-1.06	9.96	-3.71	6.41	5.59
Richelieu	55.89	6.10	10.08	-3.30	20.28	-2.77	4.13	-7.15	8.82	7.63
Richmond	46.75	7.11	19.86	0.96	12.76	-5.08	5.45	-14.36	14.70	13.3
Rimouski	41.75	16.85	21.37	3.94	28.64	-15.28	3.01	-9.32	4.75	4.75
Rivière-du-Loup-Témiscouata	52.06	12.88	14.61	3.58	17.58	2.33	3.97	-29.49	11.27	10.18
Robert-Baldwin	9.75	-1.57	5.02	0.68	2.60	-0.67	57.76	-16.09	16.02	12.99
Roberval	56.19	32.03	6.83	-3.87	20.53	1.51	4.55	-37.91	11.37	9.65
Rosemont	23.06	7.50	37.62	2.37	21.27	-7.16	11.79	-4.98	4.54	3.95
Rousseau	50.58	-2.66	13.14	0.14	17.86	-8.49	3.45	-1.77	14.98	13.98
Rouyn-Noranda-Témiscamingue	45.16	14.83	30.94	-1.14	11.25	-7.06	4.37	-12.02	7.66	6.79
Saint-François	42.43	7.70	28.21	5.53	9.11	-7.08	7.91	-15.39	11.01	11.01
Saint-Henri-Sainte-Anne	17.73	-0.95	27.72	3.89	8.27	-3.20	36.15	-1.91	6.36	5.14
Saint-Hyacinthe	54.42	2.42	13.64	-3.08	16.70	0.72	4.13	-9.98	9.84	9.84
Saint-Jean	50.65	11.15	14.76	0.32	19.22	-11.77	5.98	-5.66	8.40	7.53
Saint-Jérôme	50.02	6.28	15.62	-0.23	18.83	-8.59	4.53	-4.44	9.74	8.86
Saint-Laurent	14.29	-0.87	9.92	1.30	5.92	-0.55	49.97	-12.00	13.88	10.85
Sainte-Marie-Saint-Jacques	14.31	3.32	47.69	-1.59	14.72	0.73	15.85	-5.30	4.98	4.46
Sainte-Rose	38.50	1.66	14.33	0.45	12.39	-2.11	23.98	-6.14	9.37	8.21
Sanguinet	48.78	5.24	13.11	-1.61	16.30	-8.47	9.86	-4.12	10.57	9.38
Sherbrooke	35.25	11.86	41.91	7.64	9.09	-5.50	5.84	-18.83	6.74	6.74
Soulanges	42.62	3.39	10.84	-0.71	10.27	0.02	21.82	-11.92	12.47	11.64
Taillon	41.51	7.75	18.90	1.22	20.31	-7.77	11.62	-5.12	6.47	5.82
Taschereau	21.93	2.95	39.53	-2.99	22.57	4.93	5.89	-11.77	8.76	8.76
Terrebonne	49.44	6.47	12.65	-0.21	18.88	-10.61	10.17	-1.95	7.94	7.24
Trois-Rivières	50.81	9.74	16.35	-0.83	14.34	-1.09	5.54	-17.30	12.26	10.55
Ungava	36.27	9.76	24.23	7.70	12.55	-13.42	18.19	-6.73	8.76	6.52
Vachon	44.91	1.3	15.01	0.51	13.37	-3.67	16.07	-4.96	8.90	7.68
Vanier-Les Rivières	47.39	2.29	12.15	-0.06	13.07	3.12	6.28	-19.28	19.52	15.93
Vaudreuil	32.77	0.14	9.23	-0.82	7.70	-2.35	34.22	-5.70	11.62	9.92
Verchères	51.28	13.79	14.44	-0.32	20.71	-14.96	5.28	-3.54	7.08	6.25
Verdun	23.00	2.62	30.75	6.80	8.33	-4.29	29.27	-6.24	5.35	4.65
Viau	15.18	-0.55	30.44	6.11	7.58	-0.73	38.18	-8.45	6.14	4.88
Vimont	34.28	-0.59	11.48	-0.04	10.57	-1.82	29.85	-6.84	12.88	11.95
Westmount-Saint-Louis	10.08	0.40	12.82	2.57	6.05	0.98	50.48	-16.23	9.21	7.01

=== Post-election pendulum ===
The robustness of the margins of victory for each party can be summarized in electoral pendulums. These are not necessarily a measure of the volatility of the respective riding results. The following tables show the margins over the various 2nd-place contenders, for which one-half of the value represents the swing needed to overturn the result. Actual seat turnovers in the 2022 election are noted for reference.

= seats that turned over in the election

Post-election pendulum - 2022 Quebec general election

CAQ (90 seats)
Margins 5% or less
Beauce-Nord	PCQ	0.60
Fabre	PLQ	0.89
Beauce-Sud	PCQ	1.15
Laporte	PLQ	1.94
Laval-des-Rapides	PLQ	3.17
Gaspé	PQ	3.90
Vimont	PLQ	4.43
Margins 5%–10%
Anjou-Louis-Riel	PLQ	5.05
Marie-Victorin	PQ	8.26
Hull	PLQ	8.72
Jean-Talon	QS	8.75
Margins 10%–20%
Bellechasse	PCQ	10.48
Lotbinière-Frontenac	PCQ	11.51
Ungava	QS	12.04
Rimouski	PQ	13.11
Saint-François	QS	14.21
Rouyn-Noranda-Témiscamingue	QS	14.22
Châteauguay	PLQ	14.33
Joliette	PQ	14.35
Bonaventure	PQ	14.39
La Peltrie	PCQ	14.45
Sainte-Rose	PLQ	14.52
Chauveau	PCQ	15.00
Portneuf	PCQ	17.64
Montmorency	PCQ	19.12
Margins > 20%
Chutes-de-la-Chaudière	PCQ	20.26
Duplessis	PQ	20.35
Soulanges	PLQ	20.80
Taillon	PQ	21.20
Mégantic	PCQ	23.92
Côte-du-Sud	PCQ	24.28
Bertrand	PQ	24.63
Charlesbourg	PCQ	24.63
Nicolet-Bécancour	PCQ	24.82
Lac-Saint-Jean	PQ	25.85
Abitibi-Ouest	PQ	25.98
Pointe-aux-Trembles	PQ	26.01
Prévost	PQ	26.64
Orford	QS	26.79
Richmond	QS	26.89
Arthabaska	PCQ	27.06
Gatineau	PLQ	27.18
Montarville	PQ	27.22
Vanier-Les Rivières	PCQ	27.87
Lévis	PCQ	28.04
Vachon	PLQ	28.85
Argenteuil	PQ	28.90
Deux-Montagnes	PQ	29.92
Brome-Missisquoi	QS	29.96
Charlevoix-Côte-de-Beaupré	PCQ	30.05
Berthier	PQ	30.15
Terrebonne	PQ	30.56
Verchères	PQ	30.57
Chambly	PQ	30.57
Louis-Hébert	PQ	30.69
Saint-Jérôme	PQ	31.19
Saint-Jean	PQ	31.43
Groulx	QS	31.53
Borduas	PQ	31.77
Huntingdon	PLQ	32.26
Abitibi-Est	PLQ	32.46
Sanguinet	PQ	32.48
Rousseau	PQ	32.72
Mirabel	PQ	33.33
Masson	PQ	33.36
Labelle	PQ	33.95
Blainville	PQ	34.02
Drummond-Bois-Francs	PCQ	34.25
Les Plaines	PQ	34.41
Trois-Rivières	QS	34.46
Rivière-du-Loup-Témiscouata	PQ	34.48
Repentigny	PQ	34.63
Laviolette-Saint-Maurice	PCQ	34.98
Richelieu	PQ	35.61
Roberval	PQ	35.65
Beauharnois	PQ	36.82
Johnson	PCQ	37.37
Maskinongé	PCQ	37.45
Saint-Hyacinthe	PQ	37.72
René-Lévesque	PQ	37.75
Iberville	PQ	37.90
Champlain	PCQ	38.34
Chapleau	PLQ	38.69
La Prairie	PLQ	38.86
Papineau	QS	39.04
Dubuc	PQ	40.06
Jonquière	PQ	40.10
Granby	QS	43.91
L'Assomption	QS	44.30
Chicoutimi	PQ	48.06

PLQ (21 seats)
Margins 5% or less
Mille-Îles	CAQ	1.45
Vaudreuil	CAQ	1.45
Margins 5%–10%
La Pinière	CAQ	7.33
Viau	QS	7.74
Saint-Henri-Sainte-Anne	QS	8.43
Chomedey	CAQ	9.82
Margins 10%–20%
Bourassa-Sauvé	CAQ	15.11
Pontiac	CAQ	18.98
Mont-Royal-Outremont	QS	19.07
Margins > 20%
Marguerite-Bourgeoys	CAQ	21.63
Marquette	CAQ	24.91
Acadie	QS	25.07
D'Arcy-McGee	PCQ	29.46
LaFontaine	CAQ	31.66
Notre-Dame-de-Grâce	QS	34.96
Nelligan	CAQ	35.38
Saint-Laurent	CAQ	35.67
Jeanne-Mance-Viger	CAQ	37.33
Westmount-Saint-Louis	QS	37.65
Robert-Baldwin	PCQ	41.74
Jacques-Cartier	PCQ	51.33
QS (11 seats)
Margins 5% or less
Verdun	PLQ	1.48
Margins 5%–10%
Jean-Lesage	CAQ	6.51
Sherbrooke	CAQ	6.66
Maurice-Richard	CAQ	7.51
Margins 10%–20%
Rosemont	CAQ	14.57
Taschereau	PQ	16.97
Margins > 20%
Laurier-Dorion	PLQ	29.22
Sainte-Marie-Saint-Jacques	PLQ	31.83
Hochelaga-Maisonneuve	CAQ	32.04
Mercier	PQ	39.36
Gouin	PQ	45.81
PQ (3 seats)
Îles-de-la-Madeleine	CAQ	6.44
Camille-Laurin	CAQ	9.74
Matane-Matapédia	CAQ	50.07

=== Results summary by region ===
Distribution of seats and popular vote %, by party by region (2022)
Region	Seats				Vote share (%)					Change (pp)					
Region	CAQ	Lib	QS	PQ	CAQ	Lib	QS	PQ	Cons	CAQ	Lib	QS	PQ	Cons	Major swing
Abitibi-Témiscamingue	3	–	–	–	46.23	7.61	21.42	14.52	9.74	+11.13	-7.89	-1.10	-8.77	+9.05	→ 9.95
Bas-Saint-Laurent	2	–	–	1	38.01	3.09	13.92	36.50	8.01	+12.20	-16.48	+2.40	-5.08	+7.46	→ 14.34
Capitale-Nationale	9	–	2	–	42.18	6.00	16.26	13.53	20.84	-1.23	-16.02	-0.64	+1.81	+17.53	→ 16.78
Centre-du-Québec	4	–	–	–	51.02	3.94	10.73	13.80	19.87	-7.21	-8.30	-2.60	+1.65	+17.69	→ 13.00
Chaudière-Appalaches	7	–	–	–	45.94	4.63	7.90	9.26	31.91	-12.15	-14.32	-1.37	+1.17	+28.60	→ 21.46
Côte-Nord	2	–	–	–	52.00	2.81	8.46	22.98	12.93	+18.30	-12.64	-2.87	-15.15	+11.54	→ 16.73
Estrie	6	–	1	–	46.33	8.08	21.57	11.53	12.07	+9.86	-14.41	-0.71	-3.52	+11.55	→ 12.98
Gaspésie–Îles-de-la-Madeleine	2	–	–	1	42.54	7.71	9.20	35.62	4.64	+26.25	-22.79	-5.12	-0.96	+4.64	→ 24.52
Lanaudière	7	–	–	–	51.09	6.17	13.01	20.08	9.14	+3.76	-3.21	-0.77	-6.70	+8.62	→ 5.92
Laurentides	10	–	–	–	48.51	7.79	14.28	17.50	10.65	+3.37	-5.66	-0.92	-4.30	+9.79	→ 7.73
Laval	4	2	–	–	32.49	30.23	12.43	10.83	12.71	+0.16	-6.83	+0.15	-2.32	+11.24	→ 9.04
Mauricie	4	–	–	–	53.06	5.17	11.15	14.07	15.71	+7.59	-17.07	-3.24	+0.08	+14.00	→ 15.54
Montérégie	18	2	–	–	45.73	13.63	14.07	15.73	9.01	+3.42	-6.97	-0.93	-2.46	+8.21	→ 7.59
Montreal	2	16	8	1	18.66	34.92	22.52	10.71	8.82	+1.71	-8.03	+0.59	-1.33	+7.48	→ 7.76
Nord-du-Québec	1	–	–	–	36.27	18.19	24.23	12.55	8.76	+9.76	-6.73	+7.70	-13.42	+6.52	→ 11.59
Outaouais	4	1	–	–	43.04	21.30	14.04	9.30	10.48	+6.97	-12.57	-0.64	-0.35	+8.65	→ 10.61
Saguenay–Lac-Saint-Jean	5	–	–	–	57.50	3.01	9.28	19.37	10.29	+22.37	-18.02	-2.24	-10.05	+8.80	→ 20.20
Total	90	21	11	3	40.98	14.37	15.43	14.61	12.91	+3.56	-10.45	-0.67	-2.45	+11.45	→ 10.95

=== Detailed analysis ===
Gallagher Index for the 2022 Quebec general election
Party	Votes (%)	Seats (%)	Difference	Difference squared
CAQ	40.98%	72.00%	31.02	962.2404
PLQ	14.37%	16.80%	2.43	5.9049
QS	15.43%	8.80%	-6.63	43.9569
PQ	14.61%	2.40%	-12.21	149.0841
PCQ	12.91%	0.00%	-12.91	166.6681
Others	1.70%	0.00%	-1.7	2.89
Total of differences squared				1330.7444
Total / 2				665.3722
Square root of (Total / 2): Gallagher Index result				25.79
^{The Gallagher Index ranges from 0 to 100. Low indexes (close to 0) are very proportionate, high indexes (20 or greater) are very disproportionate.}

Party candidates in 2nd place
Party in 1st place	Party in 2nd place					Total
Party in 1st place	CAQ	Lib	QS	PQ	PCQ	Total
Coalition Avenir Québec	–	15	12	41	22	90
Liberal	12	–	6	–	3	21
Québec solidaire	5	3	–	3	–	11
Parti Québécois	3	–	–	–	–	3
Total	20	18	18	44	25	125

Principal races, according to 1st and 2nd-place results
Parties		Seats
█ Coalition Avenir Québec	█ Parti Québécois	44
█ Coalition Avenir Québec	█ Liberal	27
█ Coalition Avenir Québec	█ Conservative	22
█ Coalition Avenir Québec	█ Québec solidaire	17
█ Liberal	█ Québec solidaire	9
█ Liberal	█ Conservative	3
█ Québec solidaire	█ Parti Québécois	3
Total		125

Party rankings (1st to 5th place)
Party	1st	2nd	3rd	4th	5th
Coalition Avenir Québec	90	20	11	4	–
Liberal	21	18	6	16	64
Québec solidaire	11	18	52	41	2
Parti Québécois	3	44	28	28	18
Conservative	–	25	28	35	37
Canadian	–	–	–	1	2
Green	–	–	–	–	1
Bloc Montreal	–	–	–	–	1

=== Seats changing hands ===
Elections to the National Assembly of Quebec – seats won/lost by party, 2018–2022
Party	2018	Gain from (loss to)								2022
Party	2018	CAQ		Lib		PQ		QS		2022
Coalition Avenir Québec	74			8		8	(1)	1		90
Liberal	31		(8)						(2)	21
Parti Québécois	10	1	(8)							3
Québec solidaire	10		(1)	2						11
Total	125	1	(17)	10	–	8	(1)	1	(2)	125

The following seats changed allegiance from the 2018 election:

PQ to CAQ

- Bonaventure
- Duplessis
- Gaspé
- Joliette
- Jonquière
- Marie-Victorin*
- René-Lévesque
- Rimouski

Liberal to CAQ

- Anjou–Louis-Riel
- Fabre
- Hull
- Jean-Talon*
- Laporte
- Laval-des-Rapides
- Roberval*
- Vimont

CAQ to PQ

- Camille-Laurin

Liberal to QS

- Maurice-Richard
- Verdun

QS to CAQ

- Rouyn-Noranda–Témiscamingue

* - byelection gains held

Resulting composition of the 43rd Quebec Legislature
Source		Party				
Source		CAQ	Lib	PQ	QS	Total
Seats retained	Incumbents returned	60	11	2	8	81
Seats retained	Open seats held	13	10		1	24
Seats changing hands	Incumbents defeated	4		1	1	6
Seats changing hands	Open seats gained	10			1	11
Seats changing hands	Byelection gains held	3				3
Total		90	21	3	11	125

=== Incumbent MNAs who were defeated ===
MNAs defeated (2022)
Party	Riding	MNA	Position held	First elected	Defeated by	Party
█ Coalition Avenir Québec	Camille-Laurin	Richard Campeau	Parliamentary Assistant to the Minister of Environment and the Fight Against Climate Change, 2018–2022	2018	Paul St-Pierre Plamondon	█ Parti Québécois
█ Liberal	Hull	Maryse Gaudreault	Third Vice-President of the National Assembly, 2018–2022	2008	Suzanne Tremblay	█ Coalition Avenir Québec
█ Québec solidaire	Rouyn-Noranda–Témiscamingue	Émilise Lessard-Therrien		2018	Daniel Bernard	█ Coalition Avenir Québec
█ Liberal	Verdun	Isabelle Melançon	Deputy Official Opposition House Leader, 2018–2020	2016	Alejandra Zaga Mendez	█ Québec solidaire
█ Parti Québécois	Gaspé	Méganne Perry Mélançon		2018	Stéphane Sainte-Croix	█ Coalition Avenir Québec
█ Liberal	Laval-des-Rapides	Saul Polo	PLQ President, 2012–2014; Temporary Chair, 2018–2022	2014	Céline Haytayan	█ Coalition Avenir Québec

=== Significant results among independent and minor party candidates ===
Those candidates not belonging to a major party, receiving more than 1,000 votes in the election, are listed below:

Riding	Party	Candidates	Votes	Placed
D'Arcy-McGee	█ Canadian	Marc Perez	1,285	5th
Jacques-Cartier	█ Green	Virginie Beaudet	1,074	6th
Jacques-Cartier	█ Canadian	Arthur Fischer	1,462	4th
Nelligan	█ Canadian	Jean Marier	1,014	6th
Notre-Dame-de-Grâce	█ Bloc Montreal	Balarama Holness	1,701	5th
Robert-Baldwin	█ Canadian	Jonathan Gray	1,231	5th
Westmount–Saint-Louis	█ Canadian	Colin Standish	1,029	6th

== Post election ==
The PQ Parti Québécois and its leader, Paul St-Pierre Plamondon, said after the general election in 2022 that they would not take the Oath of Allegiance to the King upon attempting to take their seats in the National Assembly of Quebec, arguing, "you can't serve two masters at the same time." On 19 October 2022, the 11 Québec Solidaire MNAs announced they also did not wish to swear the Oath of Allegiance.

In response, the President of the National Assembly, François Paradis, asserted that the PQ and Québec Solidaire MNAs were required to recite the oath or risk expulsion from the legislature. While QS members eventually did swear allegiance, on 1 December 2022, PQ MNAs continued to refuse and were stopped from entering the legislature.

The Executive Council, occupied by the Coalition Avenir Québec party, headed by François Legault, thereafter tabled a bill that purported to amend the constitution of Canada so as to add to Section 128 of the Constitution Act, 1867—the clause requiring the Oath of Allegiance for legislators—a statement that the section does not apply to Quebec. That bill passed the assembly with unanimous consent on 6 December 2022. The law is enabled by section 45 of the Constitution Act, 1982.
