= Mont-Royal–Outremont =

Provincial electoral district in Quebec, Canada

Quebec electoral district
- Location in Montreal

Provincial electoral district
- Legislature: National Assembly of Quebec
MNA
Michelle Setlakwe
Liberal
- First contested: 2018
- Last contested: 2026

Demographics
- Census division: Montreal (part)
- Census subdivision(s): Montreal (part), Mont-Royal

Mont-Royal–Outremont (French pronunciation: [mɔ̃ ʁwajal utʁəmɔ̃]) is a provincial electoral district in Quebec, Canada. It was created from parts of Mont-Royal and Outremont districts. It was first contested in the 2018 Quebec general election.

== Members of the National Assembly ==
Legislature	Years	Member	Party
Riding created from Mont-Royal and Outremont
42nd	2018–2022	Pierre Arcand	Liberal
43rd	2022–2026	Michelle Setlakwe	Liberal
44th	2026–Present	Michelle Setlakwe	Liberal

== Election results ==
2026 Quebec general election
** Preliminary results — Not yet official **
Party	Candidate	Votes	%	±%
Liberal	Michelle Setlakwe	16,196	50.94	
Québec solidaire	Marianne Locas-Ouimet	6,594	20.74	
Parti Québécois	Ariane Bureau	3,730	11.73	
Conservative	Yaron Avsker	2,883	9.07	
Coalition Avenir Québec	Sarah Beaumier	1,690	5.31	
Green	Mathias Mackowiak	445	1.40	
Canadian	Sonia Moscote	160	0.50	
Communist	Gia Rose	99	0.31	
Total valid votes				
Total rejected ballots				
Turnout			54.34	
Electors on the lists			–	–
Source: Élections Québec

2022 Quebec general election
Party	Candidate	Votes	%	±%
Liberal	Michelle Setlakwe	11,658	39.35	-11.99
Québec solidaire	Isabelle Leblanc	6,008	20.28	+4.84
Coalition Avenir Québec	Sarah Beaumier	4,677	15.79	+2.28
Parti Québécois	Ophélie Bastien	3,385	11.42	-0.34
Conservative	Sabrina Ait Akil	2,522	8.51	+6.88
Green	Malik Guelmi	785	2.65	-1.66
Canadian	Anne Goldberg Harrison	507	1.71	–
Parti nul	David A. Cherniak	87	0.29	–
Total valid votes		29,629	98.65	–
Total rejected ballots		404	1.35	–
Turnout		30,033	53.70	-2.01
Electors on the lists		55,931	–	–

2018 Quebec general election
Party	Candidate	Votes	%	±%
Liberal	Pierre Arcand	16,026	51.34	
Québec solidaire	Eve Torres	4,820	15.44	
Coalition Avenir Québec	Anne-Marie Gagnon	4,218	13.51	
Parti Québécois	Caroline Labelle	3,672	11.76	
Green	Vincent J. Carbonneau	1,344	4.31	
NDP (1963) (2014)	Rebecca Anne Clark	548	1.76	
Conservative	Yaakov Pollak	509	1.63	
Marxist–Leninist	Normand Fournier	79	0.25	
Total valid votes		31,216	98.90	
Total rejected ballots		347	1.10	
Turnout		31,563	55.71	
Eligible voters		56,659		
Source(s) "Rapport des résultats officiels du scrutin". Élections Québec.

== See also ==
- List of Quebec provincial electoral districts
- Canadian provincial electoral districts
