= Michelle Setlakwe =

Canadian politician

Michelle Setlakwe MNA

Member of the National Assembly of Quebec for Mont-Royal–Outremont
- Incumbent
- Assumed office October 3, 2022
- Preceded by: Pierre Arcand

Personal details
- Born: 1973 (age 52–53) Thetford Mines, Quebec
- Party: Quebec Liberal Party
- Spouse: Michael Fortier
- Parent: Raymond Setlakwe

Michelle Setlakwe is a Canadian politician, who was elected to the National Assembly of Quebec in the 2022 Quebec general election. She represents the riding of Mont-Royal–Outremont as a member of the Quebec Liberal Party.

== Biography ==
She served on the municipal council of Mount Royal, Quebec from 2016 to 2021.

As of September 7, 2024, she serves as the opposition critic for Municipal Affairs, Access to Information and Privacy, Cybersecurity and Digital Technologies, and Chaudière-Appalaches.

She is the niece of former Canadian senator Raymond Setlakwe, and is married to former senator and federal cabinet minister Michael Fortier.

== Electoral record ==
2026 Quebec general election: Mont-Royal–Outremont
** Preliminary results — Not yet official **
Party	Candidate	Votes	%	±%
Liberal	Michelle Setlakwe	16,196	50.94	
Québec solidaire	Marianne Locas-Ouimet	6,594	20.74	
Parti Québécois	Ariane Bureau	3,730	11.73	
Conservative	Yaron Avsker	2,883	9.07	
Coalition Avenir Québec	Sarah Beaumier	1,690	5.31	
Green	Mathias Mackowiak	445	1.40	
Canadian	Sonia Moscote	160	0.50	
Communist	Gia Rose	99	0.31	
Total valid votes				
Total rejected ballots				
Turnout			54.34	
Electors on the lists			–	–
Source: Élections Québec

2022 Quebec general election: Mont-Royal-Outremont
Party	Candidate	Votes	%	±%
Liberal	Michelle Setlakwe	11,658	39.35	-11.99
Québec solidaire	Isabelle Leblanc	6,008	20.28	+4.84
Coalition Avenir Québec	Sarah Beaumier	4,677	15.79	+2.28
Parti Québécois	Ophélie Bastien	3,385	11.42	-0.34
Conservative	Sabrina Ait Akil	2,522	8.51	+6.88
Green	Malik Guelmi	785	2.65	-1.66
Canadian	Anne Goldberg Harrison	507	1.71	–
Parti nul	David A. Cherniak	87	0.29	–
Total valid votes		29,629	98.65	–
Total rejected ballots		404	1.35	–
Turnout		30,033	53.70	-2.01
Electors on the lists		55,931	–	–
