= Mont-Royal (provincial electoral district) =

Coordinates: 45°30′50″N 73°38′40″W

Quebec electoral district

Defunct provincial electoral district
- Legislature: National Assembly of Quebec
- District created: 1972
- First contested: 1973
- Last contested: 2014

Demographics
- Population (2006): 75,118
- Electors (2014): 43,154
- Area (km²): 14.4
- Census division: Montreal (part)
- Census subdivision(s): Montreal (part), Mount Royal

Mont-Royal (French pronunciation: [mɔ̃ ʁwajal]) is a provincial electoral district in Quebec, Canada that elects members to the National Assembly of Quebec. It is located within the island of Montreal, and comprises the city of Mount Royal and part of the Côte-des-Neiges–Notre-Dame-de-Grâce borough of Montreal.

It was created for the 1973 election from parts of D'Arcy-McGee, Dorion and Outremont electoral districts.

In the change from the 2001 to the 2011 electoral map, its territory was unchanged. Following the change in the 2017 electoral map, the riding will be dissolved into D'Arcy-McGee and the new riding of Mont-Royal–Outremont.

== Members of the National Assembly ==
| Legislature | Years | Member | Party |
|---|---|---|---|
Riding created from D'Arcy-McGee, Dorion and Outremont
| 30th | 1973–1976 | John Ciaccia | Liberal |
| 31st | 1976–1981 | John Ciaccia | Liberal |
| 32nd | 1981–1985 | John Ciaccia | Liberal |
| 33rd | 1985–1989 | John Ciaccia | Liberal |
| 34th | 1989–1994 | John Ciaccia | Liberal |
| 35th | 1994–1998 | John Ciaccia | Liberal |
| 36th | 1998–2003 | André Tranchemontagne | Liberal |
| 37th | 2003–2007 | Philippe Couillard | Liberal |
| 38th | 2007–2008 | Pierre Arcand | Liberal |
| 39th | 2008–2012 | Pierre Arcand | Liberal |
| 40th | 2012–2014 | Pierre Arcand | Liberal |
| 41st | 2014–2018 | Pierre Arcand | Liberal |
Dissolved into Mont-Royal–Outremont

== Election results ==
2014 Quebec general election
| Party | Candidate | Votes | % | ±% |
|---|---|---|---|---|
| Liberal | Pierre Arcand | 23,297 | 80.06 | +13.84 |
| Coalition Avenir Québec | Jamilla Leboeuf | 2,020 | 6.94 | -6.34 |
| Parti Québécois | Audrey Beauséjour | 1,603 | 5.51 | -3.41 |
| Québec solidaire | Roy Semak | 1,440 | 4.95 | -1.88 |
| Green | Darryl Giraud | 526 | 1.81 | -0.53 |
| Conservative | Hélène Floch | 161 | 0.55 | – |
| Marxist–Leninist | Diane Johnston | 51 | 0.18 | -0.10 |
| Total valid votes | | 29,098 | 99.11 | – |
| Total rejected ballots | | 261 | 0.89 | -0.14 |
| Turnout | | 29,359 | 68.03 | +5.83 |
| Electors on the lists | | 43,154 | – | – |
| Liberal hold | | Swing | | +10.09 |

2012 Quebec general election
| Party | Candidate | Votes | % | ±% |
|---|---|---|---|---|
| Liberal | Pierre Arcand | 16,892 | 66.23 | -10.09 |
| Coalition Avenir Québec | Stefan Stanczykowski | 3,387 | 13.28 | +9.81* |
| Parti Québécois | André Normandeau | 2,276 | 8.92 | -2.66 |
| Québec solidaire | Marc-André Beauchamp | 1,743 | 6.83 | +3.23 |
| Green | Ken McMurray | 597 | 2.34 | -2.26 |
| Option nationale | Guillaume Blanchet | 363 | 1.42 | – |
| Coalition pour la constituante | Amal Bouchentouf | 177 | 0.69 | – |
| Marxist–Leninist | Diane Johnston | 71 | 0.28 | -0.15 |
| Total valid votes | | 25,506 | 98.97 | – |
| Total rejected ballots | | 266 | 1.03 | – |
| Turnout | | 25,772 | 62.20% | - |
| Electors on the lists | | 41,431 | – | – |

* Result compared to Action démocratique

2008 Quebec general election
| Party | Candidate | Votes | % | ±% |
|---|---|---|---|---|
| Liberal | Pierre Arcand | 12,234 | 76.32 | +5.82 |
| Parti Québécois | Simon-Robert Chartrand | 1,856 | 11.58 | +1.89 |
| Green | Mario Bonenfant | 737 | 4.60 | -2.91 |
| Québec solidaire | Robbie Mahoud | 577 | 3.60 | +0.08 |
| Action démocratique | Caroline Morgan | 557 | 3.47 | -4.84 |
| Marxist–Leninist | Diane Johnston | 69 | 0.43 | -0.04 |
| | Total valid votes | 16,030 | 98.73 | |
| | Total rejected ballots | 207 | 1.27 | |
| | Turnout | 16,237 | 38.79 | |
| | Electors on the lists | 41,855 | | |

2007 Quebec general election
| Party | Candidate | Votes | % | ±% |
|---|---|---|---|---|
| Liberal | Pierre Arcand | 16,056 | 70.50 | -10.51 |
| Parti Québécois | Zhao Xin Wu | 2,207 | 9.69 | -3.65 |
| Action démocratique | Alexandre Tremblay-Michaud | 1,893 | 8.31 | +3.54 |
| Green | Boris-Antoine Legault | 1,710 | 7.51 | - |
| Québec solidaire | Antonio Artuso | 801 | 3.52 | - |
| Marxist–Leninist | Diane Johnston | 108 | 0.47 | - |
| | Total valid votes | 22,775 | 98.83 | |
| | Total rejected ballots | 270 | 1.17 | |
| | Turnout | 23,045 | 54.45 | |
| | Electors on the lists | 42,323 | | |

2003 Quebec general election
| Party | Candidate | Votes | % | ±% |
|---|---|---|---|---|
| Liberal | Philippe Couillard | 21,021 | 80.91 | +0.67 |
| Parti Québécois | Vincent Gagnon | 3,465 | 13.34 | +0.60 |
| Action démocratique | Nour-Eddine Hajibi | 1,240 | 4.77 | +1.23 |
| Equality | Frank Kiss | 256 | 0.99 | −0.90 |

1998 Quebec general election
| Party | Candidate | Votes | % | ±% |
|---|---|---|---|---|
| Liberal | André Tranchemontagne | 24,367 | 80.24 | -0.17 |
| Parti Québécois | André Normandeau | 3,869 | 12.74 | -0.39 |
| Action démocratique | Nathalie Chabot | 1,076 | 3.54 | +1.41 |
| Equality | Miriam Schleifer McCormick | 575 | 1.89 | +0.07 |
| Marxist–Leninist | Louise Charron | 190 | 0.63 | - |
| Socialist Democracy | Robbie Mahood | 167 | 0.55 | +0.05 |
| Communist | Antonio Artuso | 125 | 0.41 | +0.10 |

1995 Quebec referendum
| Side | Votes | % |
|---|---|---|
| Non | 32,333 | 86.54 |
| Oui | 5,030 | 13.46 |

1994 Quebec general election
| Party | Candidate | Votes | % | ±% |
|---|---|---|---|---|
| Liberal | John Ciaccia | 22,827 | 80.41 | +26.84 |
| Parti Québécois | Magda Greiss | 3,727 | 13.13 | +1.00 |
| Action démocratique | Daniel Massicotte | 605 | 2.13 | - |
| Equality | Nathan Gans | 518 | 1.82 | -26.24 |
| CANADA! | George Butcher | 252 | 0.89 | - |
| Natural Law | José Torres | 144 | 0.51 | - |
| New Democrat | Roland Morin | 143 | 0.50 | -0.63 |
| Communist | Despina Hagimanolis | 89 | 0.31 | - |
| Commonwealth of Canada | Denis Tremblay | 84 | 0.30 | - |

1992 Charlottetown Accord referendum
| Side | Votes | % |
|---|---|---|
| Oui | 19,884 | 82.19 |
| Non | 4,310 | 17.81 |

1989 Quebec general election
| Party | Candidate | Votes | % | ±% |
|---|---|---|---|---|
| Liberal | John Ciaccia | 10,846 | 53.57 | -25.60 |
| Equality | Nat S. Bernstein | 5,681 | 28.06 | - |
| Parti Québécois | Amin Hachem | 2,456 | 12.13 | -2.17 |
| Green | Trevor Mc Alpine | 941 | 4.65 | +3.70 |
| New Democrat | John Philip Penner | 229 | 1.13 | -1.86 |
| Marxist–Leninist | Fernand Deschamps | 92 | 0.45 | - |
