= Dominique Chaloult =

- Occupation: Television executive
- Spouse: Pierre Arcand

Dominique Chaloult is a Québécoise media executive. She took office as executive director for television at public broadcaster Radio-Canada in 2015.

== Biography ==
=== Career ===
After leaving school and travelling to Mexico, Chaloult returned to Quebec to become a DJ at CIME-FM. She then became a researcher for television and worked her way up as a programming director, mainly in comedies and varieties. Chaloult had some big successes but has admitted to her share of less successful shows which she looks back on for having developed talent. She was a variety advisor to TVA. Chaloult became director of varieties at Radio-Canada from June 2004 to June 2009.

Chaloult set aside her career for a year to travel abroad and support her husband, Pierre Arcand, who had become Minister of International Relations. Finding that international diplomacy was not for her, Chaloult returned to broadcasting and founded her own production company, La boîte de Prod transl. Prod Box, which she presided over for a year and a half before selling her shares.

Chaloult was general manager of programming and new media at Télé-Québec from January 2012 to December 2014. During her stay at Télé-Québec, she developed Les Bobos, Deux hommes en or, SNL Québec and 125, Marie-Anne. According to Columnist Nathalie Petrowski, Chaloult revived the public broadcaster by taking risks and launching daring and diverse programming.

Chaloult was appointed executive director of Television for Radio-Canada, taking office in January 2015.

In 2016 Chaloult created a television cultural strategy branch at Radio-Canada to develop an action plan that better reflects the diversity of the broadcaster's audience. In 2017 Chaloult was honoured with a tribute at the Women's Film, Television and Digital Media Gala.

=== Personal life ===
Dominique Chaloult is the spouse of MNA Pierre Arcand. She is the daughter of press secretary Francine Chaloult, sister of author Rafaële Germain and sister-in-law of Paul Arcand. Women in her family have been leaders in media: her mother, Francine Chaloult, was the first female press secretary; her mother-in-law, Colette Chabot, was a journalist and founded CIME 99.5, the first FM radio station in the Laurentians; and her aunt, Suzanne Lévesque, hosted programmes on radio and television. Dominique Chaloult owns an equestrian centre and has a great passion for horses.
