= Pierre Arcand =

Canadian politician (born 1951)

Leader of the Opposition of Quebec
- In office October 18, 2018 – May 11, 2020
- Preceded by: Jean-François Lisée
- Succeeded by: Dominique Anglade

Interim Leader of the Quebec Liberal Party
- In office October 5, 2018 – May 11, 2020
- President: Antoine Atallah; Linda Caron
- Preceded by: Philippe Couillard
- Succeeded by: Dominique Anglade
Quebec Executive Council
President of the Treasury Board
In office October 11, 2017 – October 18, 2018
Premier	Philippe Couillard
Preceded by	Pierre Moreau
Succeeded by	Christian Dubé
Minister of Energy and Natural Resources
In office April 23, 2014 – October 11, 2017
Premier	Philippe Couillard
Preceded by	Martine Ouellet
Succeeded by	Pierre Moreau
Minister for Environment, Sustainable Development and Parks
In office August 11, 2010 – September 19, 2012
Premier	Jean Charest
Preceded by	Line Beauchamp
Succeeded by	Daniel Breton
Minister of International Relations Minister responsible for the Francophonie
In office December 28, 2008 – August 11, 2010
Premier	Jean Charest
Preceded by	Monique Gagnon-Tremblay
Succeeded by	Monique Gagnon-Tremblay

Member of the National Assembly of Quebec for Mont-Royal–Outremont (Mont-Royal; 2007–2018)
- In office March 26, 2007 – October 3, 2022
- Preceded by: Philippe Couillard
- Succeeded by: Michelle Setlakwe

Personal details
- Born: November 13, 1951 (age 74) Saint-Hyacinthe, Quebec, Canada
- Party: Quebec Liberal Party
- Spouse(s): Marie-Claude Delisle (m. 1974) Dominique Chaloult
- Children: Pierre-Etienne Arcand; Louis-Jerome Arcand; David Arcand; Emmanuelle Arcand
- Relatives: Paul Arcand (brother)
- Profession: Businessman; journalist

Pierre Arcand (born November 13, 1951) is a Canadian politician, businessman, announcer and journalist in Quebec, Canada. He was the elected Member of the National Assembly of Quebec (MNA) for the provincial riding of Mont-Royal–Outremont in the Island of Montreal from 2007 to 2022. He represented the Quebec Liberal Party. On October 5, 2018, Arcand was named interim leader, following the resignation of Philippe Couillard after the 2018 Quebec general election.

He is the brother of journalist Paul Arcand.

== Studies and professional career ==
Arcand attended Cégep de Saint-Hyacinthe and the HEC (Hautes etudes commerciales) in the 1970s.

== Radiophony ==
Arcand started his journalistic career in 1978 at CKAC as a news editor and then the radio station's vice president and the director of information. He was then the senior vice-president of Metromedia CMR Broadcasting Inc. in which the company acquired several radio and television stations across the province but mainly in the Montreal area. Among those included CKOI-FM and CFCF-AM. In 2002, he became the president of Corus Entertainment's Corus Quebec radio division, which purchased Metromedia's radio stations.

He was involved with the Tel-Aide community organization as an administration member.

== Provincial politics ==
In 2007, Arcand announced his candidacy in the provincial election for the riding of Mont-Royal which was left vacant by Health minister Philippe Couillard who announced his candidacy in the riding of Jean-Talon in Quebec City replacing Margaret Delisle. He decided to run to improve the province's economic competitiveness.

Following his easy re-election in 2008, Arcand was given his first cabinet position. He was named the Minister for International Relations, replacing Monique Gagnon-Tremblay who was promoted to President of the Treasury Board replacing Monique Jérôme-Forget. Arcand was also given the portfolio of the Francophonie that was left vacant by Benoit Pelletier who did not seek re-election.

Since August 11, 2010, he has held the position of Minister of Sustainable Development, the Environment and Parks. He has also served as a member of the Ministerial Committee for Economic Prosperity and Sustainable Development since January 15, 2009.

He was re-elected in September 2012 and in April 2014 and, since April 2014, has held the position of Minister of Energy and Natural Resources, Minister responsible for the Northern Plan, Minister responsible for the Lanaudiere region, and Minister responsible for the Laurentides region. In July 2014, Arcand was awarded the Fray International Sustainability Award at SIPS 2014/Shechtman International Symposium in Mexico, for his achievements and contributions to sustainable development in politics.

At the dissolution of the house in August 2018, Arcand was Minister responsible for Government Administration and Ongoing Program Review, Chair of the Conseil du trésor, and Minister responsible for the Côte-Nord region.

In the 2018 election, Arcand was reelected in the redistributed riding of Mont-Royal–Outremont.

In December 2020, Arcand was found to have been vacationing in Barbados, despite the COVID-19 pandemic and public health advisories to avoid unnecessary travel, and as a result, was removed from his role as the opposition's critic for transportation and his position to represent the Quebec Liberals on Montreal issues.

== Interim Liberal leader ==
On October 5, 2018, Arcand was named interim leader, following the resignation of Philippe Couillard after the 2018 Quebec general election. This role ended when Dominique Anglade became party leader on May 11, 2020.

=== Guy Ouellette case ===
As soon as he was elected interim party leader, Arcand expelled Guy Ouellette from the Liberal caucus.

Quebec provincial government of Jean Charest
Cabinet posts (3)
Predecessor	Office	Successor
Monique Gagnon-Tremblay	Minister of International Relations; 2008–2010	Monique Gagnon-Tremblay
Benoit Pelletier	Minister for the Francophonie; 2008–2012	Jean-François Lisée
Line Beauchamp	Minister for Environment, Sustainable Development and Parks; 2010–2012	Daniel Breton
