= Candidates of the 2007 Quebec general election =

The results in each riding (electoral division) were:

Cabinet members are in bold type. Party leaders are in italics. The Premier is in both.

== Bas-Saint-Laurent and Gaspésie–Îles-de-la-Madeleine ==
Electoral district	Candidates						Incumbent
Electoral district	Liberal	PQ	ADQ	QS	Green	Other	Incumbent
Bonaventure	**Nathalie Normandeau**	Doris Chapados	Karine Delarosbil	Hélène Morin			**Nathalie Normandeau**
Gaspé	Georges Mamelonet	Guy Lelièvre	Bruno Cloutier	Annie Chouinard			Guy Lelièvre
Îles-de-la-Madeleine	Pierre Proulx	Maxime Arseneau	Patrick Leblanc		Nicolas Tremblay		Maxime Arseneau
Kamouraska-Témiscouata	**Claude Béchard**	Nancy Gagnon	Gérald Beaulieu	Céline Tremblay	Lise Lebel		**Claude Béchard**
Matane	Nancy Charest	Pascal Bérubé	Donald Grenier	Brigitte Michaud	François Vincent		Nancy Charest
Matapédia	Normand Boulianne	Danielle Doyer	Rémy Villeneuve	Dominic Fortin	Jean-François Guay		Danielle Doyer
Rimouski	Hélène Ménard	Irvin Pelletier	Roger Picard	Guylaine Bélanger	Stéphanie Théorêt		†Solange Charest
Rivière-du-Loup	Jean D'Amour	Hugues Belzile	Mario Dumont		Martin Poirier		Mario Dumont

== Saguenay–Lac-Saint-Jean and Côte-Nord ==
Electoral district	Candidates						Incumbent
Electoral district	Liberal	PQ	ADQ	QS	Green	Other	Incumbent
Chicoutimi	André Harvey	Stéphane Bédard	Luc Picard	Colette Fournier	Daniel Fortin		Stéphane Bédard
Dubuc	Johnny Simard	Jacques Côté	Robert Émond	Marie Francine Bienvenue	Michel Marécat		Jacques Côté
Duplessis	Marc Proulx	Lorraine Richard	Bernard Lefrançois	Olivier Noël	Jacques Gélineau		Lorraine Richard
Jonquière	**Françoise Gauthier**	Sylvain Gaudreault	Marc Jomphe	Sylvain Bergeron	Dominic Rouette	Pierre Laliberté (Independent)	**Françoise Gauthier**
Lac-Saint-Jean	Yves Bolduc	Alexandre Cloutier	Éric Girard	Denis Plamondon	Vital Tremblay		†Stéphan Tremblay
René-Lévesque	François Désy	Marjolain Dufour	André Desrosiers	Mylène Lapierre	Styves Griffith		Marjolain Dufour
Roberval	Karl Blackburn	Denis Trottier	Mario-Michel Jomphe	Nicole Schmitt			Karl Blackburn

== Capitale-Nationale ==
Electoral district	Candidates						Incumbent
Electoral district	Liberal	PQ	ADQ	QS	Green	Other	Incumbent
Charlesbourg	Éric R. Mercier	Richard Marceau	Catherine Morissette	Réjean Dumais	Rama Borne MacDonald		Éric R. Mercier
Charlevoix	Jean-Guy Bouchard	Rosaire Bertrand	Conrad Harvey	Lucie Charbonneau	David Turcotte		Rosaire Bertrand
Chauveau	Sarah Perreault	Robert Miller	Gilles Taillon	Nathalie Brochu	Mathilde Lavoie Morency		Sarah Perreault
Jean-Lesage	**Michel Després**	Christian Simard	Jean-François Gosselin	Jean-Yves Desgagnés	Lucien Rodrigue	Jean Bédard (M-L); José Breton (Ind); Danielle Benny (DCQ)	**Michel Després**
Jean-Talon	**Philippe Couillard**	Véronique Hivon	Luc de la Sablonnière	Monique Voisine	Ali Dahan	Francis Denis (DCQ)	**Margaret F. Delisle**
La Peltrie	France Hamel	Robert Beauregard	Éric Caire	Guillame Boivin	Priscilla Schafer		France Hamel
Louis-Hébert	Sam Hamad	André Joli-Coeur	Jean Nobert	Catherine Lebossé	André Larocque	Claude Cloutier (DCQ)	Sam Hamad
Montmorency	Raymond Bernier	Daniel Leblond	Hubert Benoit	Jacques Legros	Julien Rodrigue	Denise Jetté-Cloutier (DCQ); François Martin (Ind)	Raymond Bernier
Portneuf	Jean-Pierre Soucy	Martin Courval	Raymond Francoeur	André Lavoie	Simon Sauvageau		Jean-Pierre Soucy
Taschereau	Philippe Cannon	Agnès Maltais	Caroline Pageau	Serge Roy	Yonnel Bonaventure	Luc Schulz (Ind)	Agnès Maltais
Vanier	Jean-Claude L'Abbée	Sylvain Lévesque	Sylvain Légaré	Marie Dionne	Lucien Gravelle	Louis Casgrain (DCQ)	Sylvain Légaré

== Mauricie ==
Electoral district	Candidates						Incumbent
Electoral district	Liberal	PQ	ADQ	QS	Green	Other	Incumbent
Champlain	Christian Fortin	Noëlla Champagne	Pierre-Michel Auger	Alex Noël			Noëlla Champagne
Laviolette	**Julie Boulet**	Patrick Lahaie	Stéphane Defoy	Pierrette Doucet	Pierre Audette	Josée Lafontaine (DCQ)	**Julie Boulet**
Maskinongé	Francine Gaudet	Rémy Désilets	Jean Damphousse	Mario Landry	Frédéric Demouy		Francine Gaudet
Saint-Maurice	France Beaulieu	Claude Pinard	Robert Deschamps	Marianne Mathis		Francis Mondou (Ind)	Claude Pinard
Trois-Rivières	André Gabias	Jean-Pierre Adam	Sébastien Proulx	André Lemay	Louis Lacroix	Stéphan Vincent (Ind)	André Gabias

== Chaudière-Appalaches and Centre-du-Québec ==
Electoral district	Candidates						Incumbent
Electoral district	Liberal	PQ	ADQ	QS	Green	Other	Incumbent
Arthabaska	Claude Bachand	Thérèse Domingue	Jean-François Roux	Bill Ninacs	François Fillion		Claude Bachand
Beauce-Nord	Claude Drouin	Denis Couture	Janvier Grondin	Christian Dubois	Jérémie Vachon	Benoît Roy (Ind)	Janvier Grondin
Beauce-Sud	Diane Leblanc	André Côté	Claude Morin	Marie-Claude Bisson			Diane Leblanc
Bellechasse	Dominique Vien	Sylvie Vallières	Jean Domingue	Colin Perreault	Ghislain Gaulin		Dominique Vien
Chutes-de-la-Chaudière	France Proulx	Yvan Loubier	Marc Picard	Éveline Gueppe	Jean-Luc Bugnon		Marc Picard
Drummond	Lyne Boisvert	Normand Jutras	Sébastien Schneeberger	Luce Daneau		Mario G. Bergeron (Ind)	Normand Jutras
Frontenac	**Laurent Lessard**	Juliette Jalbert	Alain Gariépy	Dominique Bernier	Pierre Richard		**Laurent Lessard**
Johnson	Nicole Brouillette	Claude Boucher	Éric Charbonneau	Marcel Pinard	Benoit Lapierre		Claude Boucher
Lévis	**Carole Théberge**	Linda Goupil	Christian Lévesque	Valérie C.-Guilloteau	Jean-Claude Lespérance	Paul Biron (DCQ); Serge Patenaude (M-L)	**Carole Théberge**
Lotbinière	Laurent Boissonneault	Annie Thériault	Sylvie Roy	Catherine Drolet			Sylvie Roy
Montmagny-L'Islet	Norbert Morin	Réjean Boulet	Claude Roy	Yvon Léveillée	Richard Piper		Norbert Morin
Nicolet-Yamaska	Yves Baril	Donald Martel	Éric Dorion	Jean Proulx		Simonne Lizotte (Ind)	† Michel Morin

== Estrie (Eastern Townships) ==
Electoral district	Candidates						Incumbent
Electoral district	Liberal	PQ	ADQ	QS	Green	Other	Incumbent
Mégantic-Compton	Johanne Gonthier	Gloriane Blais	Jocelyn Brouillette	Ludovick Nadeau	Sébastien Lanctôt		†Daniel Bouchard
Orford	Pierre Reid	Michel Breton	Steve Bourassa	Patricia Tremblay	Louis Hamel		Pierre Reid
Richmond	**Yvon Vallières**	Martyne Prévost	Pierre Hébert	Danielle Maire	Frédérick Clerson-Guicherd	Claude Bergeron (Ind)	**Yvon Vallières**
Saint-François	**Monique Gagnon-Tremblay**	Mariette Fugère	François Rioux	Suzanne Thériault	Anick Proulx		**Monique Gagnon-Tremblay**
Sherbrooke	**Jean Charest**	Claude Forgues	Michel Dumont	Christian Bibeau	Steve Dubois	Hubert Richard (Ind)	**Jean Charest**

== Montérégie ==
=== Eastern Montérégie ===
Electoral district	Candidates						Incumbent
Electoral district	Liberal	PQ	ADQ	QS	Green	Other	Incumbent
Borduas	Jacques Charbonneau	Pierre Curzi	Claude Gauthier	Julie Raby	Oliver Adam	Super Cauchon (Ind)	Vacant
Brome-Missisquoi	Pierre Paradis	Richard Leclerc	Jean L'Écuyer	Lorraine Lasnier	Vanessa Thibodeau		Pierre Paradis
Chambly	Marc Tanguay	Bertrand St-Arnaud	Richard Merlini	Alain Dubois	Marie-Mars Adam		Vacant
Iberville	Jean Rioux	Marie Bouillé	André Riedl	Danielle Desmarais	Alexandre Labbé		Jean Rioux
Richelieu	Gilles Salvas	Sylvain Simard	Philippe Rochat	Éric Noël	François Desmarais	Normand Philibert (Ind)	Sylvain Simard
Saint-Hyacinthe	Claude Corbeil	Léandre Dion	Claude L'Écuyer	Richard Gingras	Catherine Desrochers		Léandre Dion
Saint-Jean	Jean-Pierre Paquin	Dave Turcotte	Lucille Méthé	Guillaume Tremblay			Jean-Pierre Paquin
Shefford	Bernard Brodeur	Paul Sarrazin	François Bonnardel	Ginette Moreau	Jean-François Arsenault	Dominic Thibeault (BP)	Bernard Brodeur
Verchères	Paul Verret	Stéphane Bergeron	Luc Robitaille	Michelle Hudon-David	Geneviève Ménard		Stéphane Bergeron

=== South Shore ===
Electoral district	Candidates						Incumbent
Electoral district	Liberal	PQ	ADQ	QS	Green	Other	Incumbent
Beauharnois	Jean-Guy Hudon	Serge Deslières	Michael Betts	Normand Perry	Éric Desormeaux		Serge Deslières
Châteauguay	**Jean-Marc Fournier**	Michel Pinard	Chantal Marin	Véronique Pronovost	Khalil Saade		**Jean-Marc Fournier**
Huntingdon	André Chenail	Éric Pigeon	Albert De Martin	Marc Pronovost		Jean Siouville (Ind)	André Chenail
La Pinière	Fatima Houda-Pepin	Saloua Hassoun	Marc-André Beauchemin	Jean-Claude Bernheim	Claude Breton		Fatima Houda-Pepin
Laporte	Nicole Ménard	Robert Pellan	Michel Beaudoin	Michèle St-Denis	Richard Morisset		† **Michel Audet**
La Prairie	Jean Dubuc	François Rebello	Monique Roy Verville	Antoine Pich	Louis Corbeil	Normand Chouinard (M-L); Guy Latour (BP); Martin McNeil (Ind)	Jean Dubuc
Marguerite-D'Youville	Pierre Moreau	Sébastien Gagnon	Simon-Pierre Diamond	Daniel Michelin			Pierre Moreau
Marie-Victorin	Nic Leblanc	Bernard Drainville	Roger Dagenais	François Cyr	Réal Langelier	Richard Lemagnifique (BP)	†Cécile Vermette
Soulanges	Lucie Charlebois	Marc Laviolette	Sylvain Brazeau	Marielle Rodrigue	Alain Brazeau	Gilles Paquette (Ind)	Lucie Charlebois
Taillon	Anne Pâquet	Marie Malavoy	Karine Simard	Manon Blanchard	Jonathan Mortreux		Marie Malavoy
Vachon	Brigitte Mercier	Camil Bouchard	Maro Akoury	Richard St-Onge	Denis Durand		Camil Bouchard
Vaudreuil	**Yvon Marcoux**	Louisanne Chevrier	Jean-Claude Lévesque	Micheline Déry	Jean-Yves Massenet		**Yvon Marcoux**

== Montreal ==
=== East ===
Electoral district	Candidates						Incumbent
Electoral district	Liberal	PQ	ADQ	QS	Green	Other	Incumbent
Anjou	**Lise Thériault**	Sébastien Richard	Lorraine Laperrière	Francine Gagné	Alain Bissonnette	Hélène Héroux (M-L)	**Lise Thériault**
Bourassa-Sauvé	**Line Beauchamp**	Roland Carrier	Guy Mailloux	Marie-Noëlle Doucet-Paquin	Marie-Ange Germain	Charles-Antoine Gabriel (Ind)	**Line Beauchamp**
Bourget	Pierre Carrier	Diane Lemieux	Clairmont De La Croizetière	Lynda Gadoury	Scott McKay	Claudette Deschamps (DCQ)	Diane Lemieux
Crémazie	Michèle Lamquin-Éthier	Lisette Lapointe	Geneviève Tousignant	André Frappier	Nathalie Gingras	Marsha Fine (M-L)	Michèle Lamquin-Éthier
Gouin	Nathalie Rivard	Nicolas Girard	Jean-Philip Ruel	Françoise David	Yohan Tremblay	Hugô St-Onge (BP); Jocelyne Leduc (Ind)	Nicolas Girard
Hochelaga-Maisonneuve	Vahid Vidah-Fortin	Louise Harel	Marie-Chantal Pelletier	Gabriel Chevrefils	Geneviève Guérin	Christine Dandenault (M-L); Daniel Laforest (Ind); Starbuck Leroidurock (BP)	Louise Harel
Jeanne-Mance–Viger	Michel Bissonnet	Kamal El Batal	Carole Giroux	Ramon Villaruel	Hamadou Abdel Kader Nikiema	Stéphane Chénier (M-L)	Michel Bissonnet
LaFontaine	Tony Tomassi	Guido Renzi	Marie-Êve Campéano	Victorien Pilote	Jean-Christophe Mortreux		Tony Tomassi
Laurier-Dorion	Gerry Sklavounos	Elsie Lefebvre	Louise Levesque	Ruba Ghazal	Sébastien Chagnon-Jean	Mostafa Ben Kirane (Independent); Peter Macrisopoulos (M-L); Gerakis Vassilios (Ind)	Elsie Lefebvre
Mercier	Nathalie Rochefort	Daniel Turp	Gabriel Tupula Yamba	Amir Khadir	Sylvain Valiquette	Nicky Tanguay (BP)	Daniel Turp
Pointe-aux-Trembles	Daniel Fournier	André Boisclair	Martin-Karl Bourbonnais	Dominique Ritchot	Xavier Daxhelet	Julien Ferron (DCQ); Geneviève Royer (M-L); Etienne Mallette (BP)	André Boisclair
Rosemont	Yasmine Alloul	Rita Dionne-Marsolais	L. Thierry Bernard	François Saillant	Marc-André Gadoury	Garnet Colly (M-L); Raphaël Turbide (BP)	Rita Dionne-Marsolais
Sainte-Marie–Saint-Jacques	Denise Dussault	Martin Lemay	Jean-Stéphane Dupervil	Manon Massé	Corinne Ardon	Serge Lachapelle (M-L)	Martin Lemay
Viau	Emmanuel Dubourg	Naïma Mimoune	Sylvie Fontaine	Valérie Lavoie	Simon Bernier		† William Cusano

=== West ===
Electoral district	Candidates						Incumbent
Electoral district	Liberal	PQ	ADQ	QS	Green	Other	Incumbent
Acadie	Christine St-Pierre 18,090	Frédéric Lapointe	Charles Ghorayeb	André Parizeau	Nicolas Rémillard-Tessier		† Yvan Bordeleau
D'Arcy-McGee	**Lawrence Bergman**	Pierre-Philippe Emond	Marcelle Guay	Abraham Weizfeld	Robert Leibner		**Lawrence Bergman**
Jacques-Cartier	**Geoffrey Kelley**	Sophia Caporicci	Walter Rulli	Jill Hanley	Ryan Young	Andy Srougi (Ind)	**Geoffrey Kelley**
Marguerite-Bourgeoys	**Monique Jérôme-Forget**	Siou Fan Houang	Martin Marquis	Jocelyne Desautels	Serge Bellemare	Yves Le Seigle (M-L); Marc Veilleux (DCQ)	**Monique Jérôme-Forget**
Marquette	François Ouimet	Daniel Hurteau	Mark Yerbury	Johanne Létourneau	Réjean Malette	Russell Wood (Ind)	François Ouimet
Mont-Royal	Pierre Arcand	Zhao Xin Wu	Alexandre Tremblay-Michaud	Antonio Artuso	Boris-Antoine Legault	Diane Johnston (M-L)	‡**Philippe Couillard**
Nelligan	Yolande James	Dorothée Morin	Jean Lecavalier	Elahé Machouf	Jonathan Théorêt		Yolande James
Notre-Dame-de-Grâce	Russell Copeman	Sophie Fréchette	Julie Clouatre	David Mandel	Peter McQueen	Linda Sullivan (M-L)	Russell Copeman
Outremont	**Raymond Bachand**	Salim Laaroussi	Pierre Harvey	Sujata Dey	Luc Côté	Romain Angeles (Ind); Yvon Breton (M-L)	**Raymond Bachand**
Saint-Henri–Sainte-Anne	Marguerite Blais	Robin Philpot	Chantal Beauregard	Arthur Sandborn	Shawna O'Flaherty	Andrzej Jastrzebski (DCQ); Rachel Hoffman (M-L)	† Nicole Loiselle
Robert-Baldwin	Pierre Marsan	Alexandre Pagé-Chassé	Ginette Lemire	Jocelyne Mesish	Shawn Katz		Pierre Marsan
Saint-Laurent	**Jacques Dupuis**	William Fayad	Jose Fiorilo	Wissam Saliba	Stephen Marchant	Fernand Deschamps (M-L)	**Jacques Dupuis**
Verdun	**Henri-François Gautrin**	Richard Langlais	Sylvie Tremblay	David Fennario	Pierre-Yves McSween	Normand Fournier (M-L); Robert Lindblad (Ind); Gilles Noël (DCQ); Sala Samghour (BP)	**Henri-François Gautrin**
Westmount–Saint-Louis	Jacques Chagnon	Denise Laroche	Caroline Morgan	Nadia Alexan	Patrick Daoust	Nicholas Lin (M-L)	Jacques Chagnon

== Laval ==
Electoral district	Candidates						Incumbent
Electoral district	Liberal	PQ	ADQ	QS	Green	Other	Incumbent
Chomedey	Guy Ouellette	Joëlle Quérin	Phani Papachristou	Francine Bellerose	Jean Martin	Noemia Onofre de Lima (Independent); Polyvios Tsakanikas (M-L)	†Thomas J. Mulcair
Fabre	**Michelle Courchesne**	Guy Lachapelle	Patrick Pilotte	Marie-France Phisel	Julien Boisseau		**Michelle Courchesne**
Laval-des-Rapides	Alain Paquet	Marc Demers	Robert Goulet	Nicole Caron	Michel Lefebvre		Alain Paquet
Mille-Îles	Maurice Clermont	Maude Delangis	Pierre Tremblay	Nicole Bellerose	Christian Lajoie	Régent Millette (Ind)	Maurice Clermont
Vimont	Vincent Auclair	Marie-France Charbonneau	François Gaudreau	Mickael Labrie	Catherine Ouellet-Cummings		Vincent Auclair

== Lanaudière ==
Electoral district	Candidates						Incumbent
Electoral district	Liberal	PQ	ADQ	QS	Green	Other	Incumbent
Berthier	Carole Majeau	Alexandre Bourdeau	François Benjamin	Jocelyne Dupuis	André Chauvette		Alexandre Bourdeau
Joliette	Céline Beaulieu	Claude Duceppe	Pascal Beaupré	Flavie Trudel	Johanne Edsell		†Jonathan Valois
L'Assomption	Benoit Verstraete	Jean-Claude St-André	Éric Laporte	Olivier Huard	Michel Ménard		Jean-Claude St-André
Masson	Denise Cloutier	Luc Thériault	Ginette Grandmont	Marco Legrand	Jean Bonneau		Luc Thériault
Rousseau	Yves Prud'Homme	François Legault	Jean-Pierre Parrot	Alex Boisdequin-Lefort	Richard Chatagneau		François Legault
Terrebonne	Chantal Leblanc	Jocelyne Caron	Jean-François Therrien	Jean Baril	Pierre-Charles De Guise		Jocelyne Caron

== Laurentides ==
Electoral district	Candidates						Incumbent
Electoral district	Liberal	PQ	ADQ	QS	Green	Other	Incumbent
Argenteuil	David Whissell	John Saywell	Georges Lapointe	Guy Dufresne	Claude Sabourin		David Whissell
Bertrand	Daniel Desjardins	Claude Cousineau	Sylvain Charron	Jocelyne Lavoie	Richard Savignac		Claude Cousineau
Blainville	Roberto Rego	Richard Legendre	Pierre Gingras	Francis Gagnon-Bergmann	Geoffroy Chartrand		Richard Legendre
Deux-Montagnes	Paule Fortier	Daniel Goyer	Lucie Leblanc	Julien Demers	Guy Rainville	Manon Bissonnette (Ind)	†Hélène Robert
Groulx	Pierre Descoteaux	Rachel Gagnon	Linda Lapointe	Adam Veilleux	Robert Harenclak		Pierre Descoteaux
Labelle	Déborah Bélanger	Sylvain Pagé	Claude Ouellette	Luc Boisjoli	François Beauchamp		Sylvain Pagé
Mirabel	Ritha Cossette	Denise Beaudoin	François Desrochers	Jocelyn Parent	Sylvain Castonguay		Denise Beaudoin
Prévost	Richard Bélisle	Lucie Papineau	Martin Camirand	Mylène Jaccoud			Lucie Papineau

== Outaouais ==
Electoral district	Candidates						Incumbent
Electoral district	Liberal	PQ	ADQ	QS	Green	Other	Incumbent
Chapleau	**Benoît Pelletier**	Edith Gendron	Jocelyn Dumais	Jennifer Jean-Brice Vales	Roger Fleury	Pierre Soublière (M-L)	**Benoît Pelletier**
Gatineau	Stéphanie Vallée	Thérèse Viel-Déry	Martin Otis	Carmen Boucher	Gail Lemmon Walker	Lisa Leblanc (M-L)	† Réjean Lafrenière
Hull	Roch Cholette	Marcel Painchaud	François Lizotte	Bill Clennett	Mélanie Perreault	Gabriel-Girard Bernier (M-L)	Roch Cholette
Papineau	Norman MacMillan	Gilles Hébert	Serge Charette	Marie-Élaine Rouleau	Patrick Mailloux		Norman MacMillan
Pontiac	Charlotte L'Écuyer	Patrick Robert-Meunier	Victor Bilodeau	Jessica Squires	Brian Gibb	David Ethier-April (M-L)	Charlotte L'Écuyer

== Abitibi-Témiscamingue and Nord-du-Québec ==
Electoral district	Candidates				Incumbent
Electoral district	Liberal	PQ	ADQ	QS	Incumbent
Abitibi-Est	**Pierre Corbeil**	Alexis Wawanoloath	Gilles Gagnon	France-Claude Goyette	**Pierre Corbeil**
Abitibi-Ouest	Jean-Louis Carignan	François Gendron	Éric Mathieu	Caroline Sigouin	François Gendron
Rouyn-Noranda–Témiscamingue	Daniel Bernard	Johanne Morasse	Mario Provencher	France Caouette	Daniel Bernard
Ungava	Aline Sauvageau	Luc Ferland	Jacques L. Cadieux	Gilbert Hamel	† Michel Létourneau
