= 2011 Bloc Québécois leadership election =

Political party leadership election in Canada

- December 11, 2011
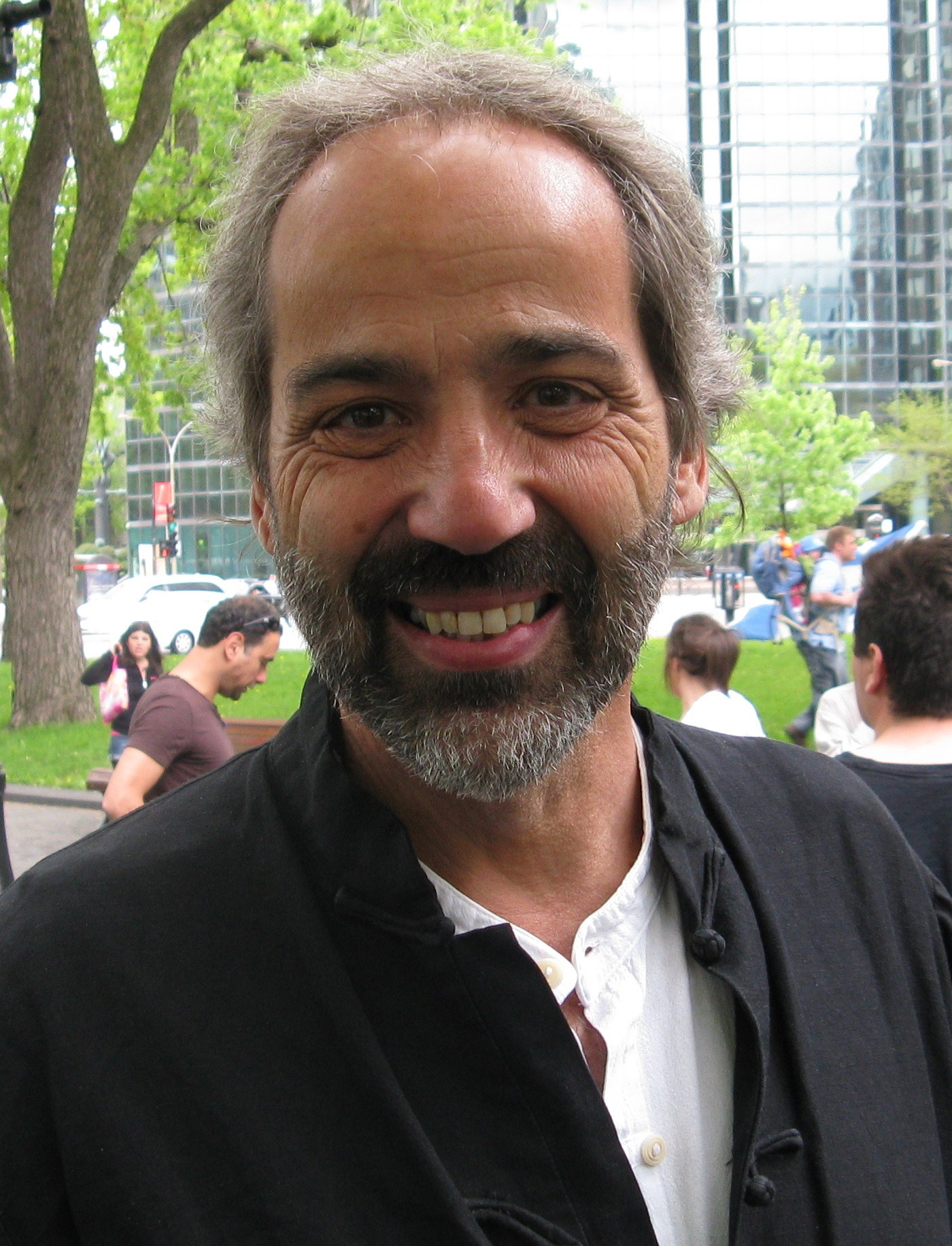

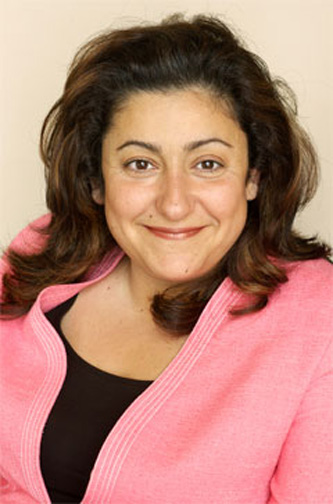
| | | | JF |
| Candidate | Daniel Paillé | Maria Mourani | Jean-François Fortin |
| Riding | N/A (Note: 2011 candidate in Hochelaga.) | Ahuntsic | Haute-Gaspésie—La Mitis—Matane—Matapédia |
| Final ballot | 7,868 (61.28%) | 4,972 (38.72%) | Eliminated |
| First ballot | 5,659 (44.05%) | 3,613 (28.13%) | 3,574 (27.82%) |
Leader before election
Vivian Barbot (interim)
Elected Leader
Daniel Paillé

2011 Bloc Québécois leadership election
- Date: December 11, 2011
- Resigning leader: Gilles Duceppe
- Won by: Daniel Paillé
- Ballots: 2
- Candidates: 3

The 2011 Bloc Québécois leadership election was held on December 11, 2011, to replace Gilles Duceppe, who resigned on May 2 after the party lost 43 of its 47 seats, including his own seat, in the 2011 federal election. It was won by Daniel Paillé.

Voter turnout for the leadership election was 38%.

== Timeline ==
=== 2011 ===
- March 25 – Stephen Harper's government is defeated in a Motion of no confidence losing 156–145 which sets-up the May 2 election.
- May 2 – The election is held. The Bloc Québécois won only 4 ridings after having 47 at dissolution of Parliament. The party lost official party status. Gilles Duceppe loses his own riding in Laurier—Sainte-Marie and announces his resignation.
- May 3 – Vivian Barbot becomes interim president after failing to regain her riding the night before.
- May 11 – Former MP Pierre Paquette announces his interest in running for leader and his intention to tour Quebec this summer to consult party members on the future of the Bloc.
- June 2 – Louis Plamondon is named the Bloc's interim parliamentary leader.
- June 8 – Party executive sets dates for the leadership election.
- August 12 – Paquette tells Le Devoir that he will not be a candidate and urges the party to delay the leadership election for a year.
- September 17 – BQ General Council meets to decide the official rules for the leadership election, the council affirmed its decision to hold the leadership election in 2011 rejecting calls to delay the election until 2012; official start of leadership race.
- October 28 – Deadline to submit signatures of 1,000 party members and become an official candidate.
- October 31 – November 18 – Advance voting at the BQ's national office during business hours.
- November 8, 6:30 p.m. – Candidates debate (Quebec City) at Loews Hôtel Le Concorde.
- November 11 – Deadline for new members to join the party.
- November 15, 6:30 p.m. – Candidates debate (Montreal) at Hôtel Delta Montréal.
- November 16 – Deadline for membership renewals.
- November 22, 7 p.m. – Internet candidates debate.
- December 10 – Deadline for completed mail-in ballots to be received.
- December 11 – Daniel Paillé declared winner after the second ballot.

== Candidates ==
=== Official candidates ===
==== Jean-François Fortin ====
Background

MP for Haute-Gaspésie—La Mitis—Matane—Matapédia (2011–2015)
Former mayor of Sainte-Flavie, Quebec
Only newly elected BQ MP in the current caucus

Date campaign launched: September 17, 2011
Supporters

- Former MPs: (14) Claude Guimond, Rimouski-Neigette—Témiscouata—Les Basques; Paul Crête, Montmagny—L'Islet—Kamouraska—Rivière-du-Loup; Marc Lemay, Abitibi—Témiscamingue; Suzanne Tremblay, Rimouski-Neigette-et-La Mitis; Yvon Lévesque, Abitibi—Baie-James—Nunavik—Eeyou; Robert Bouchard, Chicoutimi—Le Fjord; Yves Lessard, Chambly—Borduas; Ève-Mary Thaï Thi Lac, Saint-Hyacinthe—Bagot; Jean-Yves Laforest, Saint-Maurice—Champlain; Diane Bourgeois, Terrebonne—Blainville; Roger Gaudet, Montcalm; Madeleine Dalphond-Guiral, Laval Centre; Nicole Demers, Laval; Hélène Alarie, Louis-Hébert
- Provincial politicians: (6) Danielle Doyer MNA for Matapédia; Marie Bouillé MNA for Iberville; Émilien Pelletier MNA for Saint-Hyacinthe; Irvin Pelletier MNA for Rimouski; Pascal Bérubé MNA for Matane; André Simard MNA for Kamouraska-Témiscouata
- Other prominent individuals: (1) Former Portneuf—Jacques-Cartier candidate Richard Côté

==== Maria Mourani ====
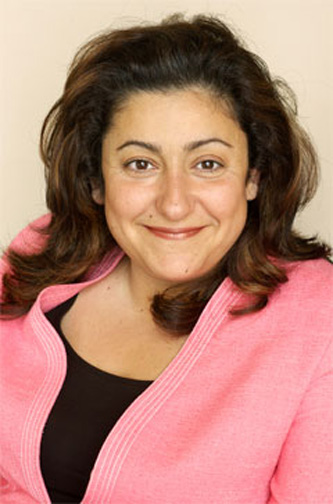
Maria Mourani

Background

MP for Ahuntsic (2006–2015)
Only BQ MP remaining from the Montreal area

Date campaign launched: September 21, 2011
Supporters

- Former MPs: (7) Christian Ouellet, Brome—Missisquoi; Johanne Deschamps, Laurentides—Labelle; France Bonsant, Compton—Stanstead; Meili Faille, Vaudreuil-Soulanges; Marcel Lussier, Brossard—La Prairie; Osvaldo Nunez, Bourassa; Francine Lalonde, La Pointe-de-l'Île
- Other prominent individuals: (4) Jean Campeau, former MNA for Crémazie; former Brome—Missisquoi candidate Christelle Bogosta; comedian François Parenteau; Forum jeunesse du Bloc Québécois, youth wing of the Bloc Québécois

Other information

- Mourani has campaigned on making the BQ more independent of the Parti Québécois.

==== Daniel Paillé ====
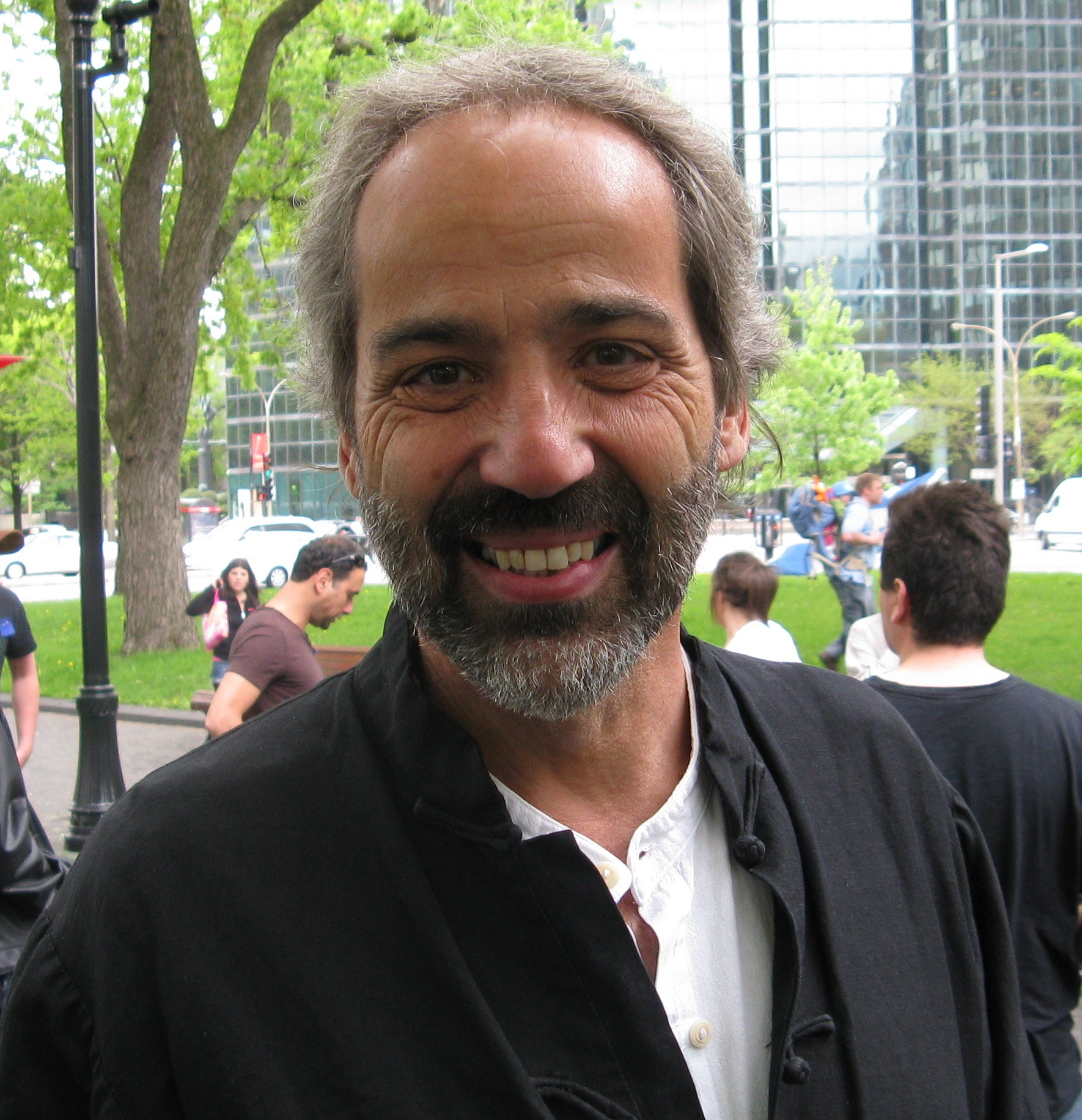
Daniel Paillé

Background

Former MP for Hochelaga (2009–2011)
Former MNA for Prévost (1994–1996)
Former Quebec Minister of Industry (1994–1996)

Date campaign launched: October 4, 2011
Supporters

- MPs: (1) André Bellavance, Richmond—Arthabaska
- Former MPs: (16) Claude DeBellefeuille, Beauharnois—Salaberry; Guy André, Berthier—Maskinongé; Roger Pomerleau, Drummond; Richard Nadeau, Gatineau; Pascal-Pierre Paillé, Louis-Hébert; Gérard Asselin, Manicouagan; Nicolas Dufour, Repentigny; Luc Desnoyers, Rivière-des-Mille-Îles; Monique Guay, Rivière-du-Nord; Carole Lavallée, Saint-Bruno—Saint-Hubert; Claude Bachand, Saint-Jean; Robert Vincent, Shefford; Paule Brunelle, Trois-Rivières; Serge Cardin, Sherbrooke; Raynald Blais, Gaspésie—Îles-de-la-Madeleine; Thierry St-Cyr, Jeanne-Le Ber
- Provincial politicians: (21) Carole Poirier MNA for Hochelaga-Maisonneuve; Yves-François Blanchet MNA for Drummond; Étienne-Alexis Boucher MNA for Johnson; Noëlla Champagne MNA for Champlain; Alexandre Cloutier MNA for Lac-Saint-Jean; Claude Cousineau MNA for Bertrand; Sylvain Gaudreault MNA for Jonquière; Guy Leclair MNA for Beauharnois; Martin Lemay MNA for Sainte-Marie–Saint-Jacques; Marie Malavoy MNA for Taillon; Agnès Maltais MNA for Taschereau; Nicolas Marceau MNA for Rousseau; Claude Pinard MNA for Saint-Maurice; Scott McKay MNA for L'Assomption; Gilles Robert MNA for Prévost; Sylvain Simard MNA for Richelieu; Mathieu Traversy MNA for Terrebonne; Guillaume Tremblay MNA for Masson; Denis Trottier MNA for Roberval; Dave Turcotte MNA for Saint-Jean; André Villeneuve MNA for Berthier
- Other prominent individuals: (9) Former LaSalle—Émard candidate Carl Dubois; former Westmount—Ville-Marie candidate Véronique Roy; former Hull—Aylmer candidate Dino Lemay; former Mégantic—L'Érable candidate Pierre Turcotte, former Honoré-Mercier candidate Martin Laroche; former Outremont candidate Élise Daoust; former Beauport—Limoilou candidate Michel Létourneau; former Roberval—Lac-Saint-Jean candidate Claude Pilote; former Jonquière—Alma candidate Pierre Forest

=== Declined ===
- Bernard Bigras, former MP for Rosemont—La Petite-Patrie (2004–2011)
- Pierre Paquette, former MP for Joliette (2000–2011), after initially expressing interest, announced in August that he will not be a candidate and called for the leadership election to be delayed until late 2012. He indicated that he may re-enter the contest if the leadership vote were delayed.

== Results ==
Support by Ballot
| Candidate | 1st ballot | | 2nd ballot | |
| Candidate | Votes cast | % | Votes cast | % |
|---|---|---|---|---|
| Daniel Paillé | 5,659 | 44.05% | 7,868 | 61.28% |
| Maria Mourani | 3,613 | 28.13% | 4,972 | 38.72% |
| Jean-François Fortin | 3,574 | 27.82% | Eliminated | |
| Total | 12,846 | 100.0% | 12,840 | 100.0% |

== See also ==
- 2011 Canadian federal election
- 2012 New Democratic Party leadership election
- 2013 Liberal Party of Canada leadership election
- 1997 Bloc Québécois leadership election
