= Lionel Carmant =

Canadian politician

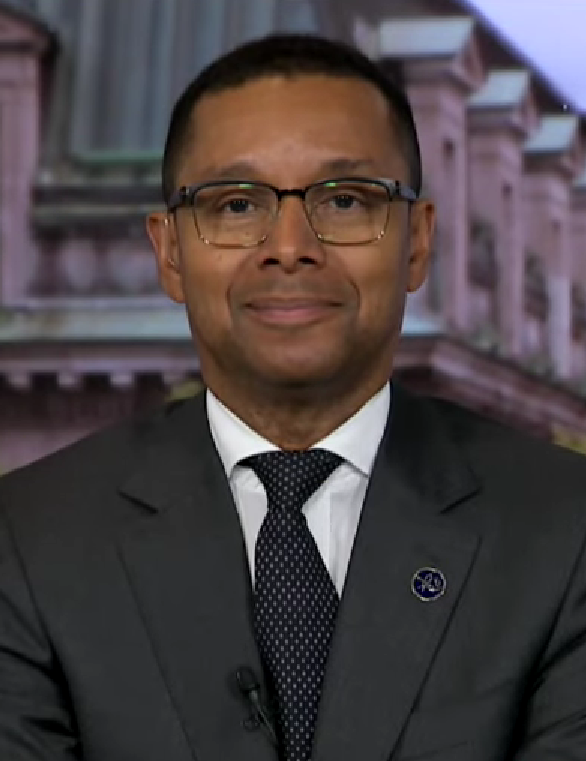
- Carmant in 2023

Quebec Minister responsible for Social Services
- In office April 21, 2026 – August 27, 2026
- Premier: Christine Fréchette
- Preceded by: Sonia Bélanger
- In office October 20, 2022 – October 30, 2025
- Premier: François Legault
- Preceded by: Christian Dubé
- Succeeded by: Sonia Bélanger

Member of the National Assembly of Quebec for Taillon
- In office October 1, 2018 – August 27, 2026
- Preceded by: Diane Lamarre
- Succeeded by: Sandra Hernández

Personal details
- Born: 1965 (age 60–61) Haiti
- Party: Coalition Avenir Québec (until 2025, 2026–present)
- Other political affiliations: Independent (2025–2026)
- Profession: Physician

Lionel Carmant is a Canadian politician who was elected to the National Assembly of Quebec in the 2018 provincial election. He represented the electoral district of Taillon and was elected as a member of the Coalition Avenir Québec.

As Associate Minister for Health in October 2018, Carmant announced that the government would tighten the rules on cannabis consumption, including increasing the legal age to consume to 21 from 18.

On October 30, 2025, Carmant resigned from his cabinet post and quit the party to sit as an independent MNA. His daughter had published an editorial in Le Devoir that criticized the government's overhaul of health legislation (Bill 2), which linked physicians' compensation to performance targets and prohibited physicians from using labour pressure tactics that could interfere with access to care. On 1 April 2026, Carmant rejoined the CAQ caucus after endorsing Christine Fréchette in the 2026 Coalition Avenir Québec leadership election. He returned to cabinet that month. He did not seek re-election in the 2026 general election.

== Electoral record ==
2022 Quebec general election: Taillon
Party	Candidate	Votes	%	±%
Coalition Avenir Québec	Lionel Carmant	14,635	41.5	+7.7
Parti Québécois	Andrée-Anne Bouvette-Turcot	7,160	20.3	-7.8
Québec solidaire	Manon Blanchard	6,663	18.9	+1.2
Liberal	Omar Cissé	4,096	11.6	-5.1
Conservative	Pierre-Marc Boyer	2,280	6.5	+5.9
Climat Québec	Frédéric Ouellet	336	1.0	–
L'Union fait la force	Pierre Savignac	86	0.2	–
Total valid votes			–	
Total rejected ballots			–	
Turnout				
Electors on the lists			–	–

2018 Quebec general election: Taillon
Party	Candidate	Votes	%	±%
Coalition Avenir Québec	Lionel Carmant	12,186	33.76	+9.54
Parti Québécois	Diane Lamarre	10,138	28.08	-5.72
Québec solidaire	Manon Blanchard	6,382	17.68	+6.57
Liberal	Mohammed Barhone	6,042	16.74	-13.24
Green	Mel-Lyna Cadieux Walker	766	2.12	
New Democratic	Jonathan Leduc	349	0.97	
Conservative	Gerardin Verty	235	0.65	
Total valid votes		36,098	98.38	
Total rejected ballots		595	1.62	
Turnout		36,693	69.12	
Eligible voters		53,083		
Coalition Avenir Québec gain from Parti Québécois		Swing		+7.63
Source(s) "Rapport des résultats officiels du scrutin". Élections Québec.
