= France-Élaine Duranceau =

Canadian politician (born 1974)

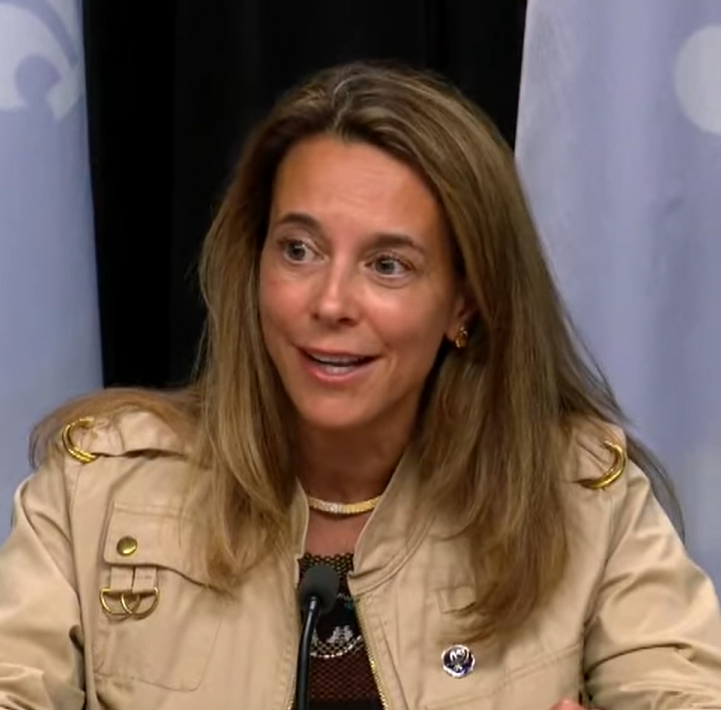
- Duranceau in 2024

Quebec Minister responsible for Government Administration and State Efficiency and President of the Treasury Board
- In office September 10, 2025 – October 5, 2026
- Preceded by: Sonia LeBel
- Succeeded by: Alain Therrien

Quebec Minister for Housing
- In office October 20, 2022 – September 10, 2025
- Preceded by: Andrée Laforest
- Succeeded by: Sonia Bélanger

Member of the Quebec Legislative Assembly for Bertrand
- In office October 3, 2022 – October 5, 2026
- Preceded by: Nadine Girault
- Succeeded by: Alexandre Girard-Duchaine

Personal details
- Born: November 28, 1974 (age 51) Montreal, Quebec, Canada
- Party: Coalition Avenir Québec

France-Élaine Duranceau (French pronunciation: [fʁɑ̃s elɛn dyʁɑ̃so]; born November 28, 1974) is a Canadian politician and real-estate agent who served as a member of the National Assembly of Quebec from 2022 to 2026. A member of the Coalition Avenir Québec, she served in cabinet under premiers François Legault and Christine Fréchette from 2022 to 2026.

== Political career ==
=== Minister of Housing ===
Ms. Duranceau made headlines in June 2023 when she tabled her first bill to amend the Housing Act. Bill 31 seeks to eliminate the right of tenants to transfer their leases. Previously, tenants were entitled to do so unless the landlord had good cause to reject the potential transferee, and allows landlords to increase prices on newly built housing without regard to the Administrative Tribunal on Housing's calculations for rent increases. It was introduced at the end of the spring 2023 parliamentary session. The bill has stirred controversy, given the escalating housing crisis in Quebec.

As a former real estate broker, the Minister of Housing believes that it is not up to tenants to decide on rent prices, and that lease transfers should no longer be allowed. Minister Duranceau admitted to Radio-Canada radio that she was unaware of the number of tenants expected to be homeless on July 1, 2023. The start date for an annual lease in Quebec is generally July 1. This has led to many ongoing questions about a potential conflict of interest and calls for the Minister to reisgn.

In November 2023, Duranceau was found to have "abusively favoured the personal interests of one of her friends (a real estate lobbyist)," by the ethics commissioner Ariane Mignolet. The Parti Québécois and Québec solidaire linked the breach of ethics with the minister’s Bill 31 on housing. “What this reveals today is not only that there was a failure on this level at the start of the mandate, it also reveals that the minister’s proximity to the real-estate developer community has also continued, taking into account Bill 31, where we very clearly see the minister’s bias toward real-estate projects, real-estate owners at the expense of tenants,” said PQ MNA Joël Arseneau.

== Electoral history ==
2022 Quebec general election: Bertrand
Party	Candidate	Votes	%	±%
Coalition Avenir Québec	France-Élaine Duranceau	15,927	45.26	+3.71
Parti Québécois	Guillaume Freire	7,259	20.63	–2.78
Québec solidaire	Julie Francoeur	5,682	16.15	–1.97
Conservative	Philippe Meloni	3,444	9.79	+9.01
Liberal	André Nadeau	2,115	6.01	–7.39
Green	Karine Steinberger	448	1.27	–0.57
Parti humain	Marie-Eve Ouellette	162	0.46	–
Climat Québec	Samuel Fortin	151	0.43	–
Total valid votes		35,188	98.74	+0.30
Total rejected ballots		448	1.26	–0.30
Turnout		35,636	64.77	–2.83
Electors on the lists		55,022	–	–
