= Marjolaine Boutin-Sweet =

Canadian politician

Member of Parliament for Hochelaga
- In office May 2, 2011 – September 11, 2019
- Preceded by: Daniel Paillé
- Succeeded by: Soraya Martinez Ferrada

New Democratic Party Whip
- In office November 12, 2015 – September 11, 2019
- Leader: Tom Mulcair; Jagmeet Singh
- Preceded by: Nycole Turmel
- Succeeded by: Rachel Blaney

Personal details
- Born: October 3, 1955 (age 70) Abitibi, Quebec
- Party: New Democratic Party
- Profession: museum interpretive guide, teacher, union organizer

Marjolaine Boutin-Sweet (born October 3, 1955) is a Canadian anthropologist, unionist, and politician, who was first elected to the House of Commons of Canada in the 2011 election. She represented the electoral district of Hochelaga as a member of the New Democratic Party. From November 2015 to October 2019, she was also the NDP's whip. She did not run for re-election in 2019.

== Career ==
After obtaining her master's degree of anthropology at the University of Alberta, Boutin-Sweet participated in various archeological digs in Canada and the United States. She also taught at the University of Alberta Campus Saint-Jean and at Grant McEwan University. From 1992 to 2011, Boutin-Sweet worked as a guide/animator at the Pointe-à-Callière Museum and was involved in union activities. Co-founder and treasurer of the museum’s employees union, which is affiliated with the Centrale des syndicats démocratiques (CSD), she was a member of the pay equity and bargaining committees. With the CSD, she sat on the committee on the status of women and served as trainer, auditor and vice-president, trade and services. Until 2011, Marjolaine worked both as an archeologist and as a trade-unionist for the Pointe-à-Callière museum.

== Political career ==
In 2011, she decided to put her name forward as a candidate for the New Democratic Party in the federal district of Hochelaga. In the 41st Canadian federal election, she was elected with 48.17% of the votes, defeating the incumbent candidate Daniel Paillé, from the Bloc Québécois. She was re-elected in Hochelaga in the 42nd Canadian federal election, an election that was subject to a recount, in which she was declared the victor by 500 votes, giving her 30.89% of the vote. On 12 November 2015, she was named Chief Whip for the NDP, as well as being asked to continue her role as Housing Critic.

After the 2015 election, Boutin-Sweet was appointed the NDP Whip as well as the critic for Housing in the 42nd Canadian Parliament.

On February 21, 2019, Boutin-Sweet announced that she wouldn't run for re-election in the 2019 Canadian federal election.

== Personal life ==
Boutin-Sweet attended high school at École secondaire Étienne-Brûlé. She is married and has two grown sons.

== Electoral record ==
2015 Canadian federal election: Hochelaga
| Party | Candidate | Votes | % | ±% | Expenditures |
|---|---|---|---|---|---|
| New Democratic | Marjolaine Boutin-Sweet | 16,034 | 30.89 | -16.59 | – |
| Liberal | Marwah Rizqy | 15,534 | 29.93 | +18.20 | – |
| Bloc Québécois | Simon Marchand | 14,389 | 27.72 | -3.04 | – |
| Conservative | Alexandre Dang | 3,555 | 6.85 | -0.35 | – |
| Green | Anne-Marie Saint-Cerny | 1,654 | 3.19 | +1.52 | – |
| Rhinoceros | Nicolas Lemay | 411 | 0.79 | +0.26 | – |
| Communist | Marianne Breton Fontaine | 179 | 0.34 | -0.05 | – |
| Marxist–Leninist | Christine Dandenault | 148 | 0.29 | -0.02 | – |
| Total valid votes/Expense limit | | 51,904 | 100.0 | | $219,055.87 |
| Total rejected ballots | | 877 | – | – | |
| Turnout | | 52,781 | – | – | |
| Eligible voters | | 82,783 | | | |
These results were subject to a judicial recount, and modified from the validated results in accordance with the Judge's rulings. The margin of Marjolaine Boutin-Sweet over Marwah Rizqy decreased from 541 votes to 500 votes as a result of the recount.
Source: Elections Canada

2011 Canadian federal election: Hochelaga
| Party | Candidate | Votes | % | ±% | Expenditures |
|---|---|---|---|---|---|
| New Democratic | Marjolaine Boutin-Sweet | 22,314 | 48.17 | +33.72 | $18,453 |
| Bloc Québécois | Daniel Paillé | 14,451 | 31.20 | −18.53 | $46,974 |
| Liberal | Gilbert Thibodeau | 5,064 | 10.93 | −9.74 | $17,622 |
| Conservative | Audrey Castonguay | 3,126 | 6.75 | −2.45 | $5,647 |
| Green | Yaneisy Delgado Dihigo | 798 | 1.72 | −2.54 | none listed |
| Rhinoceros | Hugo Samson Veillette | 246 | 0.53 | +0.03 | none listed |
| Communist | Marianne Breton Fontaine | 180 | 0.39 | −0.01 | $1,772 |
| Marxist–Leninist | Christine Dandenault | 143 | 0.31 | −0.08 | none listed |
| Total valid votes | | 46,322 | 100.00 | | |
| Total rejected ballots | | 725 | | | |
| Turnout | | 47,047 | 58.43 | +0.19 | |
| Electors on the lists | | 80,515 | | | |
Sources: Official Results, Elections Canada and Financial Returns, Elections Canada. Percentage change figures refer to voting shifts as compared with the 2008 general election, not the 2009 by-election.
