= Alexandre Girard-Duchaine =

Alexandre Girard-Duchaine MNA

Member of the National Assembly for Bertrand
- Incumbent
- Assumed office October 5, 2026
- Preceded by: France-Élaine Duranceau

Personal details
- Party: Parti Québécois

Alexandre Girard-Duchaine is a Canadian politician who is a candidate for the National Assembly of Quebec for Bertrand in the 2026 Quebec general election as a member of the Parti Québécois.

From 2013 to 2018, Girard-Duchaine was an attaché for former Saint-Jean MNA Dave Turcotte, and then an advisor to Rivière-du-Nord MP Rhéal Fortin from 2019 to 2023, when he became the general manager of the Laurentides Chamber of Commerce until his election as MNA.
