= Daniel Paillé =

Canadian politician (born 1950)

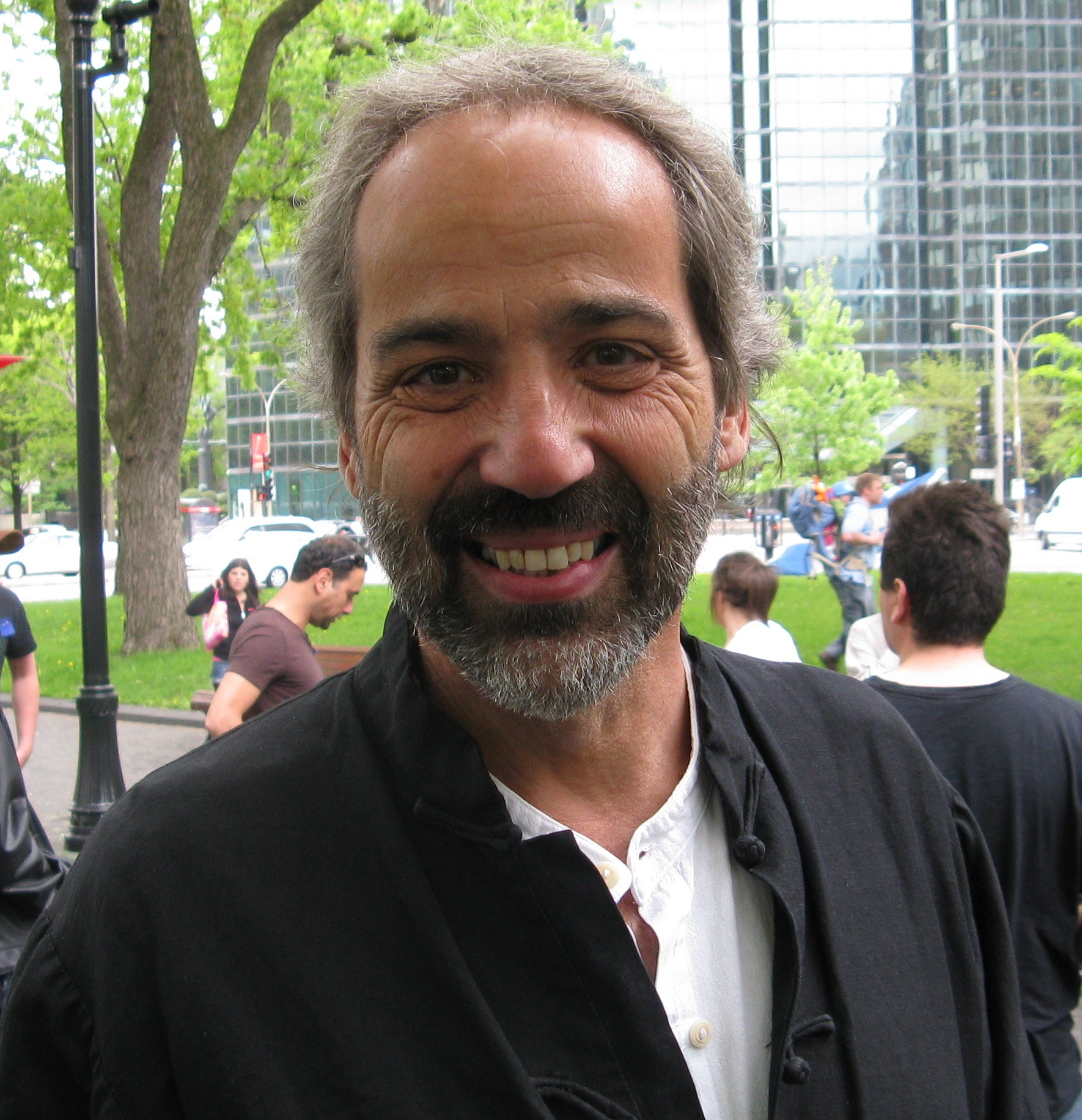

Leader of the Bloc Québécois
- In office December 11, 2011 – December 16, 2013
- Preceded by: Vivian Barbot (interim)
- Succeeded by: Mario Beaulieu

Member of Parliament for Hochelaga
- In office November 9, 2009 – May 30, 2011
- Preceded by: Réal Ménard
- Succeeded by: Marjolaine Boutin-Sweet

Member of the National Assembly for Prévost
- In office 1994 – November 19, 1996
- Preceded by: Paul-André Forget
- Succeeded by: Lucie Papineau

Personal details
- Born: April 1, 1950 (age 76) Montreal, Quebec
- Party: Parti Québécois (provincial); Bloc Québécois (federal)

Daniel Paillé (French pronunciation: [danjɛl paje]; born April 1, 1950) is a Canadian politician, who represented the riding of Prévost in the National Assembly of Quebec from 1994 to 1996 as a member of the Parti Québécois, and represented the district of Hochelaga in the House of Commons of Canada as a member of the Bloc Québécois. He was elected leader of the Bloc Québécois with 62 percent of the vote on December 11, 2011. Paillé stepped down as leader on December 16, 2013, for health reasons.

== Life and career ==
He was first elected in the 1994 election, and served as Industry minister in the government of Jacques Parizeau. He resigned as an MNA on November 19, 1996, to accept a job as vice-president of Quebec's Société générale de financement.

He was appointed by Prime Minister Stephen Harper in 2007 to investigate allegations that the Liberal Party had engaged in improper polling practices prior to the 2006 election, although his final report found evidence of substantial irregularities in Harper's own Conservative Party as well.

Paillé ran as a Bloc Québécois candidate in the federal by-election in Hochelaga on November 9, 2009, and won election to the House of Commons. His nephew, Pascal-Pierre Paillé, was elected as a Bloc Québécois MP for Louis-Hébert in the 2008 election.

Paillé lost his seat in the 2011 election which also resulted in the defeat and resignation of Gilles Duceppe (the previous BQ leader) and the reduction of the BQ to four seats. He was defeated by the NDP's Marjolaine Boutin-Sweet. Despite losing his seat, he succeeded Gilles Duceppe as Party Leader in the 2011 Bloc Québécois leadership election. Paillé defeated two sitting Bloc Québécois Members of Parliament to be elected BQ leader on December 11, 2011. He resigned from the leadership on December 16, 2013, due to health issues caused by epilepsy.

== Electoral record ==
Support by Ballot
Candidate	1st ballot		2nd ballot	
Candidate	Votes cast	%	Votes cast	%
Daniel Paillé	5,659	44.05%	7,868	61.28%
Maria Mourani	3,613	28.13%	4,972	38.72%
Jean-François Fortin	3,574	27.82%	Eliminated	
Total	12,846	100.0%	12,840	100.0%

2011 Canadian federal election: Hochelaga
Party	Candidate	Votes	%	±%	Expenditures
New Democratic	Marjolaine Boutin-Sweet	22,314	48.17	+33.72	$18,453
Bloc Québécois	Daniel Paillé	14,451	31.20	−18.53	$46,974
Liberal	Gilbert Thibodeau	5,064	10.93	−9.74	$17,622
Conservative	Audrey Castonguay	3,126	6.75	−2.45	$5,647
Green	Yaneisy Delgado Dihigo	798	1.72	−2.54	none listed
Rhinoceros	Hugo Samson Veillette	246	0.53	+0.03	none listed
Communist	Marianne Breton Fontaine	180	0.39	−0.01	$1,772
Marxist–Leninist	Christine Dandenault	143	0.31	−0.08	none listed
Total valid votes		46,322	100.00		
Total rejected ballots		725			
Turnout		47,047	58.43	+0.19	
Electors on the lists		80,515			
Sources: Official Results, Elections Canada and Financial Returns, Elections Canada. Percentage change figures refer to voting shifts as compared with the 2008 general election, not the 2009 by-election.

Canadian federal by-election, November 9, 2009: Hochelaga
Party	Candidate	Votes	%	±%	Expenditures
Bloc Québécois	Daniel Paillé	8,989	51.16	+1.43	$54,233
New Democratic	Jean-Claude Rocheleau	3,444	19.60	+5.15	$69,082
Liberal	Robert David	2,519	14.34	−6.33	$23,211
Conservative	Stéphanie Cloutier	1,768	10.06	+0.86	$37,337
Green	Christine Lebel	572	3.26	−1.00	not listed
neorhino.ca	Gabrielle Anctil	129	0.73	+0.23	$130
Marxist–Leninist	Christine Dandenault	79	0.45	+0.06	$349
Independent	John Turmel	69	0.39		none listed
Total valid votes		17,569	100.00		
Total rejected ballots		264			
Turnout		17,833	22.63	−35.61	
Electors on the lists		78,801			
Sources: Official Results, Elections Canada and Financial Returns, Elections Canada.
