= Anne-Marie Saint-Cerny =

Canadian writer and political activist

- Occupations: writer and political activist
- Writing career
- Notable work: Mégantic: Une tragédie annoncée
- Notable awards: Angoulême Award

Anne-Marie Saint-Cerny is a Canadian writer and political activist from Quebec.

She is most noted for her 2018 book Mégantic: Une tragédie annoncée, an examination of the Lac-Mégantic rail disaster of 2013, which was a shortlisted finalist for the Governor General's Award for French-language non-fiction at the 2018 Governor General's Awards.

She won an Angoulême Award 2022.

== Biography ==
She previously published the Zan series of children's books, as well as the novel La jouissance du loup à l'instant de mordre.

She was vice-president and general manager, of Fondation Rivières. She is general manager Société pour vaincre la pollution (SVP),

She was a Green Party of Canada candidate in Hochelaga in the 2015 federal election.

== Electoral record ==
2015 Canadian federal election: Hochelaga (electoral district)
Party	Candidate	Votes	%	±%	Expenditures
New Democratic	Marjolaine Boutin-Sweet	16,034	30.89	-16.59	$64,664.42
Liberal	Marwah Rizqy	15,534	29.93	+18.20	$19,746.32
Bloc Québécois	Simon Marchand	14,389	27.72	-3.04	$47,613.01
Conservative	Alexandre Dang	3,555	6.85	-0.35	$3,363.29
Green	Anne-Marie Saint-Cerny	1,654	3.19	+1.52	–
Rhinoceros	Nicolas Lemay	411	0.79	+0.26	$651.34
Communist	Marianne Breton Fontaine	179	0.34	-0.05	–
Marxist–Leninist	Christine Dandenault	148	0.29	-0.02	–
Total valid votes/Expense limit		51,904	100.0		$219,682.85
Total rejected ballots		877	–	–	
Turnout		52,781	–	–	
Eligible voters		82,783			
These results were subject to a judicial recount, and modified from the validated results in accordance with the Judge's rulings. The margin of Marjolaine Boutin-Sweet over Marwah Rizqy decreased from 541 votes to 500 votes as a result of the recount.
Source: Elections Canada
