= Nadine Girault =

Canadian politician (1959–2023)

The Honourable Nadine Girault

Member of the National Assembly of Quebec for Bertrand
- In office October 1, 2018 – August 28, 2022
- Preceded by: Claude Cousineau
- Succeeded by: France-Élaine Duranceau

Personal details
- Born: May 2, 1959
- Died: February 12, 2023 (aged 63)
- Party: Coalition Avenir Québec

Nadine Girault (May 2, 1959 – February 12, 2023) was a Canadian politician, who was elected to the National Assembly of Quebec in the 2018 provincial election. She represented the electoral district of Bertrand as a member of the Coalition Avenir Québec. She was a member of cabinet as Minister of International Relations and La Francophonie and Minister Responsible for the Laurentides Region. She stood down at the 2022 Quebec general election.

Girault died on February 12, 2023, at the age of 63, having suffered from lung cancer for over three years.

Quebec provincial government of François Legault
Cabinet post (1)
| Predecessor | Office | Successor |
|---|---|---|
| Christine St-Pierre | Minister of International Relations and La Francophonie; October 18, 2018 – October 20, 2022 | Martine Biron |
