= Diane Lamarre =

Canadian pharmacist and politician

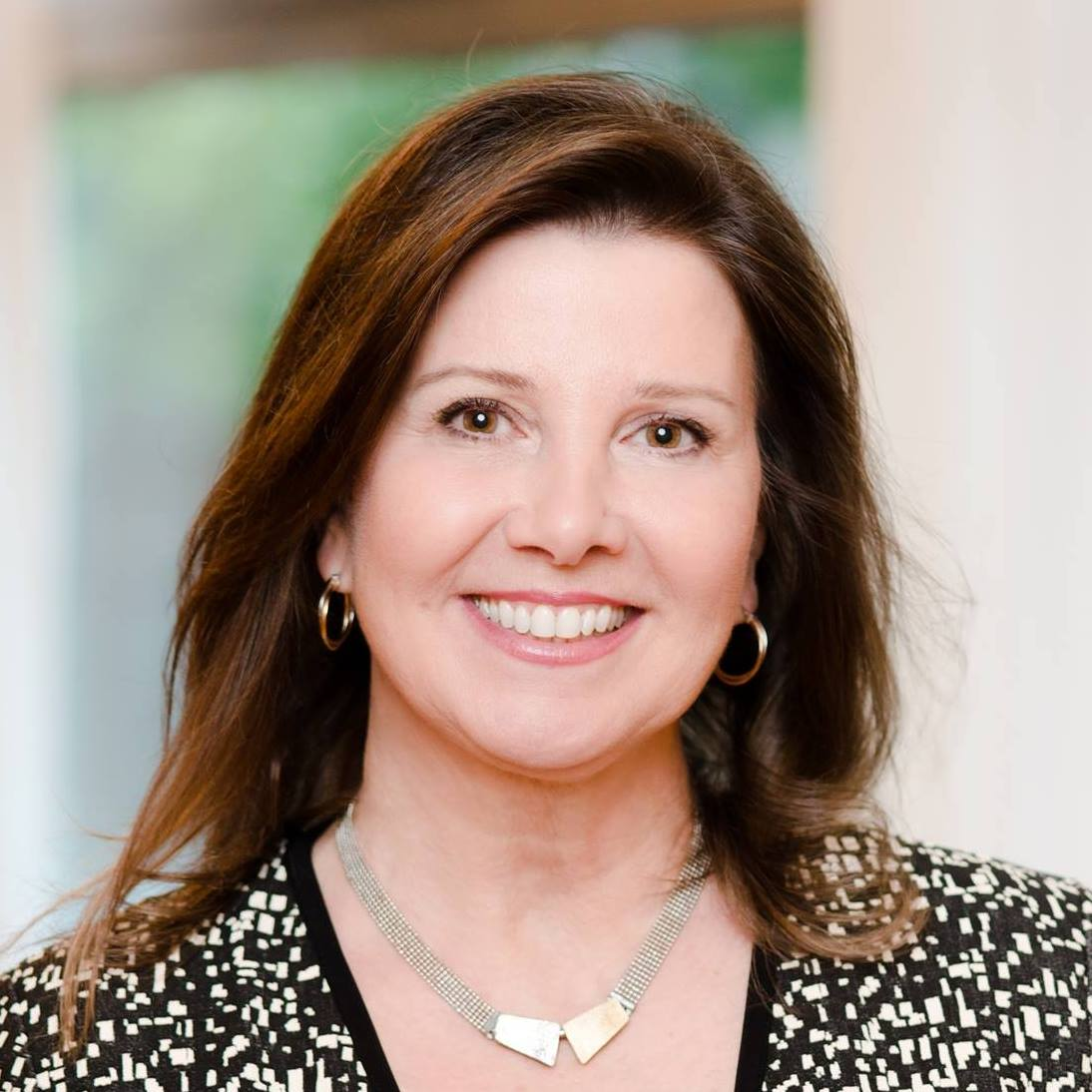

Member of the National Assembly of Quebec for Taillon
- In office April 7, 2014 – August 29, 2018
- Preceded by: Marie Malavoy
- Succeeded by: Lionel Carmant

Personal details
- Party: Parti Québécois

Diane Lamarre, C.M., M.Sc., D.h.c. is a Canadian pharmacist and politician, who was elected to the National Assembly of Quebec in the 2014 election. She represented the electoral district of Taillon as a member of the Parti Québécois until her defeat in the 2018 election.

Prior to her election to the legislature, Lamarre was the president of the Ordre des pharmaciens du Québec.

She currently appears as a medical contributor on TVA Nouvelles.
