= Anne Nguyen =

Canadian politician

Anne Nguyen MNA

Member of the National Assembly for Prévost
- Incumbent
- Assumed office October 5, 2026
- Preceded by: Sonia Bélanger

Personal details
- Party: Parti Québécois

Anne Nguyen is a Canadian politician who is the MNA for Prévost as a member of the Parti Québécois. She is the minister for Artificial Intelligence and Digital Affairs.

Nguyen is a graduate of the Harvard Business Analytics Program, an online certificate program that was offered by Harvard Business School.

She is the first Vietnamese Canadian to be elected to the National Assembly of Quebec.

== Electoral record ==
2026 Quebec general election: Prévost
** Preliminary results — Not yet official **
Party	Candidate	Votes	%	±%
Parti Québécois	Anne Nguyen	14,554	38.61	
Conservative	Joyce Sauriol	7,365	19.54	
Coalition Avenir Québec	Sonia Bélanger	6,585	17.47	
Liberal	Paul Landry	5,941	15.76	
Québec solidaire	Alix Gravel	3,085	8.18	
Démocratie directe	Sabine Groulx	165	0.44	
Total valid votes				
Total rejected ballots				
Turnout			71.70	
Electors on the lists			–	–
Parti Québécois gain from Coalition Avenir Québec		Swing		+
Source: Élections Québec
