= Guillaume Cliche-Rivard =

Canadian politician

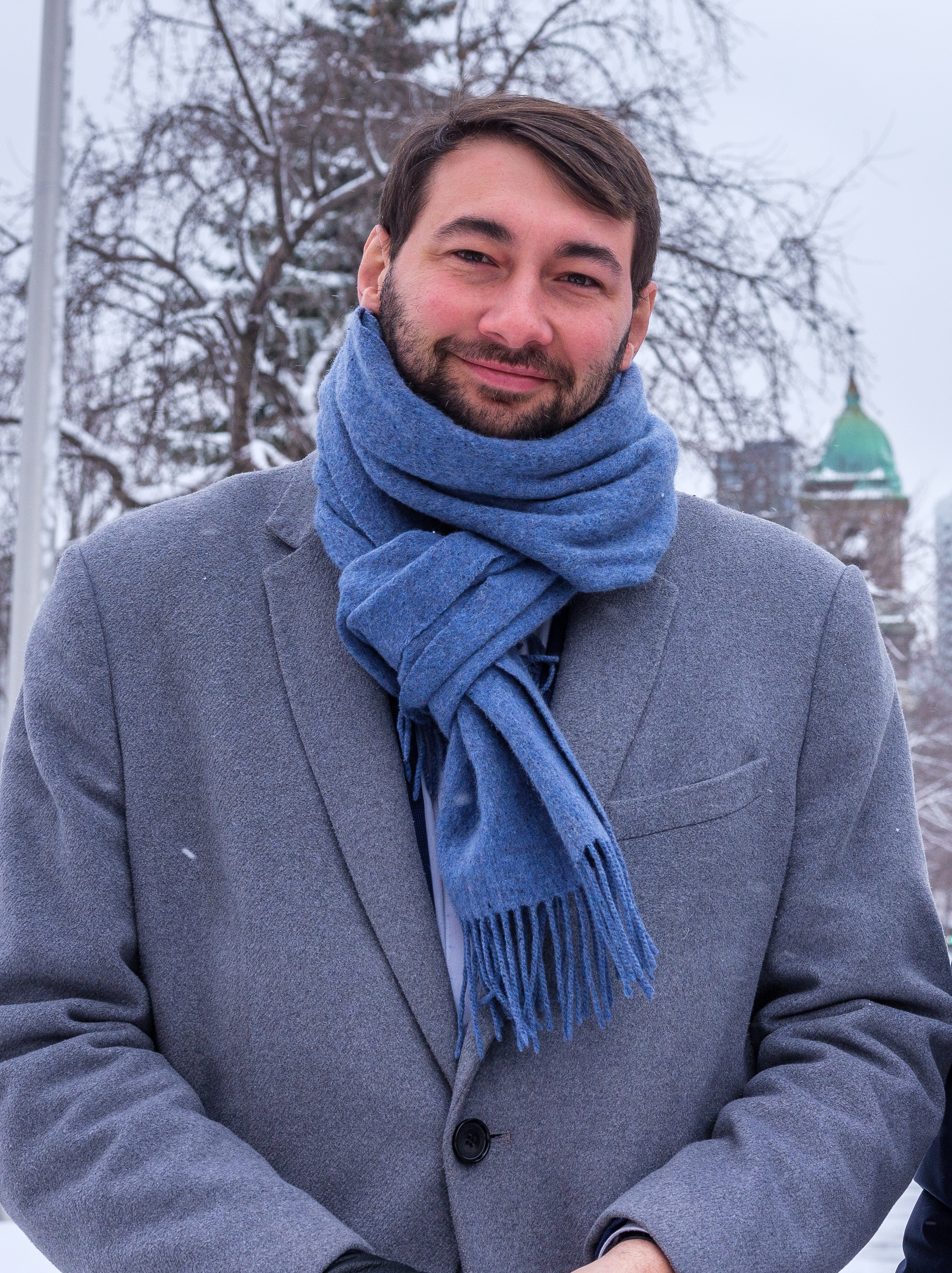

Interim Co-Spokesperson for Québec Solidaire
- In office March 24, 2025 – November 8, 2025 Serving with Ruba Ghazal
- Preceded by: Gabriel Nadeau-Dubois
- Succeeded by: Sol Zanetti

Member of the National Assembly of Quebec for Saint-Henri–Sainte-Anne
- In office March 13, 2023 – August 27, 2026
- Preceded by: Dominique Anglade
- Succeeded by: Benoit Clermont

Personal details
- Born: 1989 Saint-Jean-sur-Richelieu, Quebec
- Party: Quebec solidaire

Guillaume Cliche-Rivard is a Canadian politician, who was elected to the National Assembly of Quebec in the 2023 Saint-Henri—Sainte-Anne provincial by-election.

== Political career ==
Cliche-Rivard unsuccessfully contested Saint-Henri–Sainte-Anne in the 2022 Quebec general election. Leader of the Quebec Liberal Party Dominique Anglade resigned following the election, and Cliche-Rivard was elected in the by-election that followed.

== Electoral record ==
Quebec provincial by-election, 13 March 2023: Saint-Henri—Sainte-Anne Resignation of Dominique Anglade
Party	Candidate	Votes	%	±%
Québec solidaire	Guillaume Cliche-Rivard	7,897	44.50	+16.78
Liberal	Christopher Baenninger	5,139	28.96	-7.20
Parti Québécois	Andréanne Fiola	2,025	11.41	+3.14
Coalition Avenir Québec	Victor Pelletier	1,661	9.36	-8.37
Conservative	Lucien Koty	478	2.69	-3.67
Green	Jean-Pierre Duford	251	1.41	-0.50
Canadian	Ian Denman	113	0.64	–
Climat Québec	Jean-François Racine	67	0.38	–
Independent	Beverly Bernardo	47	0.26	–
Démocratie directe	Jean-Charles Cléroux	39	0.22	-0.01
Parti accès propriété et équité	Shawn Lalande McLean	30	0.17	–
Total valid votes		17,747		
Total rejected ballots		134		
Turnout		17,881	31.10	-26.72
Eligible voters		57,492		
Québec solidaire gain from Liberal		Swing		+11.99
Source: Élections Québec

2022 Quebec general election: Saint-Henri-Sainte-Anne
Party	Candidate	Votes	%	±%
Liberal	Dominique Anglade	11,728	36.15	-1.91
Québec solidaire	Guillaume Cliche-Rivard	8,992	27.72	+3.88
Coalition Avenir Québec	Nicolas Huard-Isabelle	5,751	17.73	-0.95
Parti Québécois	Julie Daubois	2,683	8.27	-3.20
Conservative	Mischa White	2,063	6.36	+5.14
Green	Jean-Pierre Duford	620	1.91	-1.33
Bloc Montreal	Janusz Kaczorowski	530	1.63	–
Démocratie directe	Esther Gaudreault	73	0.23	–
Total valid votes		32,440	98.91	–
Total rejected ballots		357	1.09	-0.79
Turnout		32,797	57.82	+1.21
Electors on the lists		56,721	–	–
Liberal hold		Swing		-2.90
Source(s) "2022 provincial general election results". Élections Québec.
