= 2023 Saint-Henri—Sainte-Anne provincial by-election =

By-election in Quebec

- March 14, 2023

Riding of Saint-Henri—Sainte-Anne
- Turnout: 31.10%
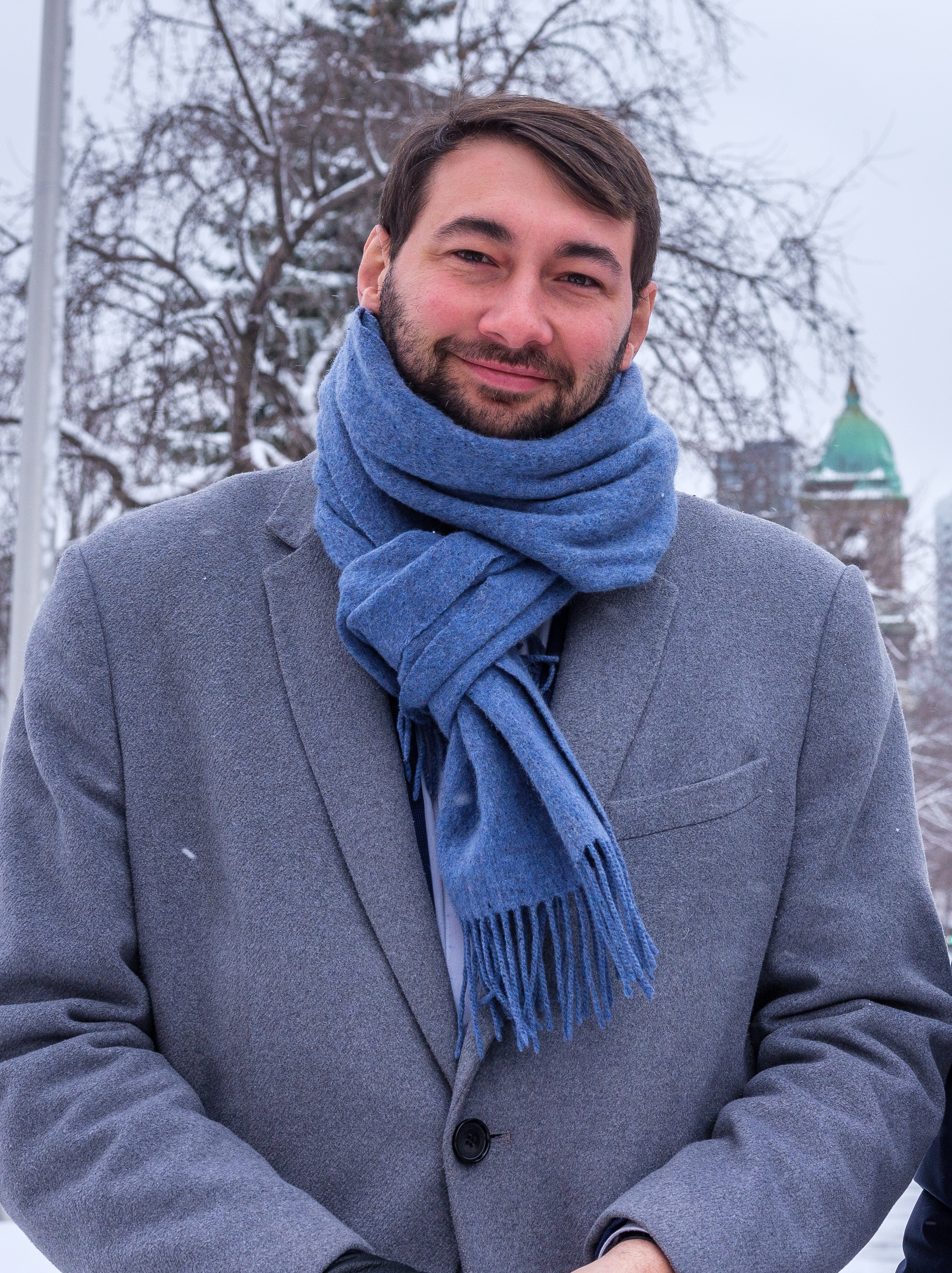
	First party	Second party
		PLQ
Candidate	Guillaume Cliche-Rivard	Christopher Baenninger
Party	Québec solidaire	Liberal
Popular vote	7,897	5,139
Percentage	44.50%	28.96%
Swing	▲16.78pp	▼7.20pp
	Third party	Fourth party
	PQ	CAQ
Candidate	Andréanne Fiola	Victor Pelletier
Party	Parti Québécois	Coalition Avenir Québec
Popular vote	2,025	1,661
Percentage	11.41%	9.36%
Swing	▲3.14pp	▼8.37pp
MNA before election
Dominique Anglade
Liberal
Elected MNA
Guillaume Cliche-Rivard
Québec solidaire

Location of Saint-Henri–Sainte-Anne in Montreal.

The 2023 Saint-Henri–Sainte-Anne provincial by-election was held on March 13, 2023. Québec solidaire's Guillaume Cliche-Rivard won the election. By winning the by-election, Québec Solidaire was able to meet the requirement of having 12 seats to attain official party status in the National Assembly.

== Background ==
=== Constituency ===
The Saint-Henri–Sainte-Anne constituency is based on the Le Sud-Ouest borough of Montreal.

=== Trigger ===
Following the 2022 Quebec general election, Dominique Anglade announced her resignation as leader of the Quebec Liberal Party on November 7, 2022. On December 1, 2022, she resigned as MNA for Saint-Henri–Sainte-Anne.

== Candidates ==
- Christopher Baenninger, Quebec Liberal Party
- Beverly Bernardo, Independent
- Jean-Charles Cléroux, Direct Democracy
- Guillaume Cliche-Rivard, Québec Solidaire
- Ian Denman, Canadian Party of Quebec
- Jean-Pierre Duford, Green Party of Quebec
- Andréanne Fiola, Parti Québécois
- Lucien Koty, Conservative Party of Quebec
- Shawn Lalande McLean, Parti accès propriété et équité (English: Access to property and equity)
- Victor Pelletier, Coalition Avenir Québec
- Jean-François Racine, Climat Quebec

== Result ==
Quebec provincial by-election, 13 March 2023: Saint-Henri—Sainte-Anne Resignation of Dominique Anglade
Party	Candidate	Votes	%	±%
Québec solidaire	Guillaume Cliche-Rivard	7,897	44.50	+16.78
Liberal	Christopher Baenninger	5,139	28.96	-7.20
Parti Québécois	Andréanne Fiola	2,025	11.41	+3.14
Coalition Avenir Québec	Victor Pelletier	1,661	9.36	-8.37
Conservative	Lucien Koty	478	2.69	-3.67
Green	Jean-Pierre Duford	251	1.41	-0.50
Canadian	Ian Denman	113	0.64	–
Climat Québec	Jean-François Racine	67	0.38	–
Independent	Beverly Bernardo	47	0.26	–
Démocratie directe	Jean-Charles Cléroux	39	0.22	-0.01
Parti accès propriété et équité	Shawn Lalande McLean	30	0.17	–
Total valid votes		17,747		
Total rejected ballots		134		
Turnout		17,881	31.10	-26.72
Eligible voters		57,492		
Québec solidaire gain from Liberal		Swing		+11.99
Source: Élections Québec

== Previous result ==
2022 Quebec general election
Party	Candidate	Votes	%	±%
Liberal	Dominique Anglade	11,728	36.15	-1.91
Québec solidaire	Guillaume Cliche-Rivard	8,992	27.72	+3.88
Coalition Avenir Québec	Nicolas Huard-Isabelle	5,751	17.73	-0.95
Parti Québécois	Julie Daubois	2,683	8.27	-3.20
Conservative	Mischa White	2,063	6.36	+5.14
Green	Jean-Pierre Duford	620	1.91	-1.33
Bloc Montreal	Janusz Kaczorowski	530	1.63	–
Démocratie directe	Esther Gaudreault	73	0.23	–
Total valid votes		32,440	98.91	–
Total rejected ballots		357	1.09	-0.79
Turnout		32,797	57.82	+1.21
Electors on the lists		56,721	–	–
Liberal hold		Swing		-2.90
Source(s) "2022 provincial general election results". Élections Québec.

== See also ==
- 2022 Quebec general election
- Dominique Anglade
- List of Quebec by-elections
- Saint-Henri–Sainte-Anne
- 2023 Jean-Talon provincial by-election
