= Sandra Hernández (politician) =

Sandra Hernández MNA
- Hernández at her nomination as Parti Québécois candidate for Taillon, June 2026

Member of the National Assembly for Taillon
- Incumbent
- Assumed office October 5, 2026
- Preceded by: Lionel Carmant

Personal details
- Party: Parti Québécois

Sandra Hernández is a Canadian politician affiliated with the Parti Québécois. She won a seat in the National Assembly of Quebec in the 2026 Quebec general election, representing the district of Taillon.

A native of Longueuil, Hernández has worked for the United Nations for more than 15 years, including assignments in Afghanistan, Colombia and Haiti.

== Electoral record ==
2026 Quebec general election: Taillon
** Preliminary results — Not yet official **
Party	Candidate	Votes	%	±%
Parti Québécois	Sandra Hernández	11,326	32.11	
Liberal	Boubacar Camara	9,279	26.31	
Coalition Avenir Québec	Stéphane Lavoie	5,460	15.48	
Québec solidaire	David Lalumière	5,284	14.98	
Conservative	Samuel Bérubé	3,599	10.20	
Parti nul	Samuel Pignedoli	320	0.91	
Total valid votes				
Total rejected ballots				
Turnout			68.40	
Electors on the lists			–	–
Parti Québécois gain from Coalition Avenir Québec		Swing		+
Source: Élections Québec
