= Benoit Clermont =

Canadian politician

Benoit Clermont MNA

Member of the National Assembly for Saint-Henri–Sainte-Anne
- Incumbent
- Assumed office October 5, 2026
- Preceded by: Guillaume Cliche-Rivard

Personal details
- Party: Liberal Party

Benoit Clermont MNA is a Canadian politician who has served as a member of the National Assembly of Quebec representing the electoral district of Saint-Henri–Sainte-Anne since 2026. He is a member of the Liberal Party.
