= Saint-Henri–Sainte-Anne =

Provincial electoral district in Quebec, Canada

Coordinates: 45.48°N 73.58°W

Quebec electoral district
- Location in Montreal

Provincial electoral district
- Legislature: National Assembly of Quebec
MNA
Benoit Clermont
Liberal
- District created: 1992
- First contested: 1994
- Last contested: 2026

Demographics
- Population (2006): 73,674
- Electors (2022): 56,721
- Area (km²): 18.4
- Pop. density (per km²): 4,004
- Census division: Montreal (part)
- Census subdivision: Montreal (part)

Saint-Henri–Sainte-Anne is a provincial electoral district in the Montreal region of Quebec, Canada, that elects members to the National Assembly of Quebec. It comprises all of the Le Sud-Ouest borough of Montreal.

It was created for the 1994 election from parts of Saint-Henri and Sainte-Anne electoral districts.

In the change from the 2001 to the 2011 electoral map, it only went minor changes; gaining some territory from the Notre-Dame-de-Grâce electoral district, and a tiny amount of territory from the Westmount–Saint-Louis electoral district.

In the change from the 2011 to the 2017 electoral map, the riding lost all of its territory in the Ville-Marie borough to the riding of Westmount–Saint-Louis.

== Members of the National Assembly ==
Legislature	Years	Member	Party
Riding created from Saint-Henri and Sainte-Anne
35th	1994–1998	Nicole Loiselle	Liberal
36th	1998–2003	Nicole Loiselle	Liberal
37th	2003–2007	Nicole Loiselle	Liberal
38th	2007–2008	Marguerite Blais	Liberal
39th	2008–2012	Marguerite Blais	Liberal
40th	2012–2014	Marguerite Blais	Liberal
41st	2014–2015	Marguerite Blais	Liberal
41st	2015–2018	Dominique Anglade	Liberal
42nd	2018–2022	Dominique Anglade	Liberal
43rd	2022–2022	Dominique Anglade	Liberal
43rd	2023–2026	Guillaume Cliche-Rivard	Québec solidaire
44th	2026–present	Benoit Clermont	Liberal

== Election results ==
2026 Quebec general election
Party	Candidate	Votes	%	±%
Liberal	Benoit Clermont	13,341	37.20	+8.24
Québec solidaire	Guillaume Cliche-Rivard	13,066	36.43	-8.07
Parti Québécois	Caroline Julie Fortin	4,740	13.22	+1.81
Conservative	Edouard Stephan Valdescault	2,631	7.34	+4.64
Coalition Avenir Québec	Anthony Lavoie	1,563	4.36	-5.00
Green	Jean-Pierre Duford	386	1.08	-0.34
Québec innovant	Laura Champagne	137	0.38	
Total valid votes		35,864	98.73	
Total rejected ballots		460	+1.27	
Turnout		36,324	60.13	+29.03
Electors on the lists		60,412		
Liberal gain from Québec solidaire		Swing		+8.15
Source: Élections Québec

Quebec provincial by-election, 13 March 2023: Saint-Henri—Sainte-Anne Resignation of Dominique Anglade
Party	Candidate	Votes	%	±%
Québec solidaire	Guillaume Cliche-Rivard	7,897	44.50	+16.78
Liberal	Christopher Baenninger	5,139	28.96	-7.20
Parti Québécois	Andréanne Fiola	2,025	11.41	+3.14
Coalition Avenir Québec	Victor Pelletier	1,661	9.36	-8.37
Conservative	Lucien Koty	478	2.69	-3.67
Green	Jean-Pierre Duford	251	1.41	-0.50
Canadian	Ian Denman	113	0.64	–
Climat Québec	Jean-François Racine	67	0.38	–
Independent	Beverly Bernardo	47	0.26	–
Démocratie directe	Jean-Charles Cléroux	39	0.22	-0.01
Parti accès propriété et équité	Shawn Lalande McLean	30	0.17	–
Total valid votes		17,747		
Total rejected ballots		134		
Turnout		17,881	31.10	-26.72
Eligible voters		57,492		
Québec solidaire gain from Liberal		Swing		+11.99
Source: Élections Québec

2022 Quebec general election
Party	Candidate	Votes	%	±%
Liberal	Dominique Anglade	11,728	36.15	-1.91
Québec solidaire	Guillaume Cliche-Rivard	8,992	27.72	+3.88
Coalition Avenir Québec	Nicolas Huard-Isabelle	5,751	17.73	-0.95
Parti Québécois	Julie Daubois	2,683	8.27	-3.20
Conservative	Mischa White	2,063	6.36	+5.14
Green	Jean-Pierre Duford	620	1.91	-1.33
Bloc Montreal	Janusz Kaczorowski	530	1.63	–
Démocratie directe	Esther Gaudreault	73	0.23	–
Total valid votes		32,440	98.91	–
Total rejected ballots		357	1.09	-0.79
Turnout		32,797	57.82	+1.21
Electors on the lists		56,721	–	–
Liberal hold		Swing		-2.90
Source(s) "2022 provincial general election results". Élections Québec.

2018 Quebec general election
Party	Candidate	Votes	%	±%
Liberal	Dominique Anglade	11,837	38.06	-13.58
Québec solidaire	Benoit Racette	7,413	23.83	+12.89
Coalition Avenir Québec	Sylvie Hamel	5,809	18.68	+7.50
Parti Québécois	Dieudonné Ella Oyono	3,568	11.47	-11.01
Green	Jean-Pierre Duford	1,009	3.24	+1.36
New Democratic	Steven Scott	690	2.22	
Conservative	Caroline Orchard	380	1.22	
Bloc Pot	Félix Gagnon-Paquin	202	0.65	
CINQ	Christopher Young	103	0.33	
Marxist–Leninist	Linda Sullivan	91	0.29	
Total valid votes		31,102	98.12	
Total rejected ballots		597	1.88	
Turnout		31,699	56.61	
Eligible voters		55,994		
Liberal hold		Swing		-13.23
Source(s) "Rapport des résultats officiels du scrutin". Élections Québec.

^ Change calculated from the redistributed 2014 results.

2014 Quebec general election redistributed results
Party	Vote	%
Liberal	18,405	51.64
Parti Québécois	8,013	22.48
Coalition Avenir Québec	3,983	11.17
Québec solidaire	3,902	10.95
Green	673	1.89
Others	668	1.87

Quebec provincial by-election, 9 November 2015
Party	Candidate	Votes	%	±%
Liberal	Dominique Anglade	5,325	38.70	-13.82
Parti Québécois	Gabrielle Lemieux	4,119	29.93	+8.03
Québec solidaire	Marie-Eve Rancourt	2,856	20.76	+10.07
Coalition Avenir Québec	Louis-Philippe Boulanger	717	5.21	-5.98
Green	Jiab Zou	487	3.54	+1.68
Option nationale	Luc Lefebvre	146	1.06	+0.46
Conservative	Christian Hébert	110	0.80	–
Total valid votes		13,760	99.17	–
Total rejected ballots		115	0.83	-0.61
Turnout		13,895	23.85	-44.43
Eligible voters		58,171		
Liberal hold		Swing		-10.93

2014 Quebec general election
Party	Candidate	Votes	%	±%
Liberal	Marguerite Blais	19,795	52.52	+14.06
Parti Québécois	Véronique Fournier	8,255	21.90	-10.17
Coalition Avenir Québec	Louis-Philippe Boulanger	4,218	11.19	-4.24
Québec solidaire	Molly Alexander	4,029	10.69	-0.62
Green	Sharon Sweeney	700	1.86	–
Parti nul	Anna Kruzynski	293	0.78	–
Option nationale	Étienne Forest	225	0.60	-1.69
Bloc Pot	Jairo Gaston Sanchez	174	0.46	–
Total valid votes		37,869	98.56	–
Total rejected ballots		550	1.44	-0.23
Turnout		38,239	68.29	+0.18
Electors on the lists		55,999	–	–
Liberal hold		Swing		+12.12

2012 Quebec general election
Party	Candidate	Votes	%	±%
Liberal	Marguerite Blais	13,894	38.46	-7.38
Parti Québécois	Sophie Stanké	11,587	32.08	-5.01
Coalition Avenir Québec	Joakim Beaupré	5,573	15.43	+9.67
Québec solidaire	Nicolas Boisclair	4,084	11.31	+4.91
Option nationale	Luc Lefebvre	827	2.29	
Unité Nationale	Andrzej Jastrzebski	157	0.43	
Total valid votes		36,122	98.33	–
Total rejected ballots		612	1.67	-0.06
Turnout		36,734	68.11	+23.35
Electors on the lists		53,934	–	–
Liberal hold		Swing		-1.19

2008 Quebec general election
Party	Candidate	Votes	%	±%
Liberal	Marguerite Blais	10,552	45.85	+7.36
Parti Québécois	Frédéric Isaya	8,535	37.08	+7.49
Québec solidaire	Marie-Eve Rancourt	1,471	6.39	-0.19
Action démocratique	Claude Ludovic Mbany	1,326	5.76	-11.75
Green	Tim Landry	985	4.28	-2.76
Marxist–Leninist	Jean-Paul Bedard	146	0.63	+0.30
Total valid votes		23,015	98.27	–
Total rejected ballots		405	1.73	–
Turnout		23,420	44.76	-16.28
Electors on the lists		52,327	–	–

2007 Quebec general election
Party	Candidate	Votes	%	±%
Liberal	Marguerite Blais	11,915	38.49	-14.42
Parti Québécois	Robin Philpot	9,162	29.59	-2.91
Action démocratique	Chantal Beauregard	5,422	17.51	+8.77
Green	Shawna O'Flaherty	2,179	7.04	+5.59
Québec solidaire	Arthur Sandborn	2,037	6.58	+4.61*
Christian Democracy	Andrzej Jastrzebski	141	0.46	-0.01
Marxist–Leninist	Rachel Hoffman	103	0.33	-0.05
Total valid votes		30,959	98.57	–
Total rejected ballots		448	1.43	–
Turnout		31,407	61.04	0.00
Electors on the lists		51,453	–	–

* Result compared to UFP

2003 Quebec general election
Party	Candidate	Votes	%	±%
Liberal	Nicole Loiselle	16,004	52.91	+4.56
Parti Québécois	Raymond Munger	9,830	32.50	-8.02
Action démocratique	Claudette Marullo	2,645	8.74	+0.01
UFP	Marc-André Payette	595	1.97	–
Green	Suzanne Moussette	439	1.45	–
Bloc Pot	Nicky Tanguay	424	1.40	–
Christian Democracy	Andrzej Jastrzebski	142	0.47	–
Marxist–Leninist	Jean-Paul Bédard	116	0.38	-0.21
Equality	Larry Vitas	52	0.17	-0.25
Total valid votes		30,247	98.50	–
Total rejected ballots		461	1.50	–
Turnout		30,708	61.04	-12.71
Electors on the lists		50,311	–	–

1998 Quebec general election
Party	Candidate	Votes	%	±%
Liberal	Nicole Loiselle	14,240	48.35	+0.39
Parti Québécois	Luc Labelle	11,933	40.52	-5.38
Action démocratique	Jean-Marc Demers	2,570	8.73	+5.53
Socialist Democracy	Sonia Marcoux	205	0.70	-0.40
Marxist–Leninist	Henrius Lachance	173	0.59	–
Independent	Jean-Noël Sorel	126	0.43	–
Equality	Fida Abou Nassif	124	0.42	–
Communist	Andrzej Jastrzebski	78	0.26	–
Total valid votes		29,449	98.55	–
Total rejected ballots		432	1.45	–
Turnout		29,881	73.75	-7.46
Electors on the lists		40,514	–	–

1995 Quebec referendum
Side	Votes	%
Non	19,380	53.13
Oui	17,097	46.87

1994 Quebec general election
Party	Candidate	Votes	%
Liberal	Nicole Loiselle	14,940	47.96
Parti Québécois	Réjean Thomas	14,299	45.90
Action démocratique	Luc Proulx	998	3.20
New Democratic	Serge Turmel	344	1.10
CANADA!	Dave Schuilenburg	229	0.74
Sovereignty	William Michaud	135	0.43
Natural Law	Satyajyoti Bhattacharjee	112	0.36
Development	Mark Jaczyk	93	0.30
Total valid votes		31,150	97.85
Total rejected ballots		683	2.15
Turnout		31,833	81.21
Electors on the lists		39,197	–

== See also ==
- List of Quebec provincial electoral districts
- Canadian provincial electoral districts
