= Gilles Robert =

Canadian politician and teacher

MNA for Prévost
- In office 2008–2012
- Preceded by: Martin Camirand
- Succeeded by: riding dissolved

Personal details
- Born: March 5, 1955 (age 71) Saint-Jérôme, Quebec
- Party: Parti Québécois
- Education: Université de Montréal; Université du Québec à Montréal
- Profession: teacher, journalist
- Portfolio: Education

Gilles Robert (born March 5, 1955) is a Canadian politician and teacher. Robert represented the riding of Prévost in the National Assembly of Quebec from 2008 to 2012. He is a member of the Parti Québécois.

Born in Saint-Jérôme, Quebec, Robert first obtained a bachelor's degree from the Université de Montréal in history in 1977 and later added a certificate in educational sciences from the Université du Québec à Montréal in 1995.

During his 30-year professional career, Robert worked as a teacher from 1977 to 1978, from 1993 to 2007 mostly in history and politics at Académie Lafontaine. He was also a project coordinator and responsible for communications at Académie Lafontaine and was a journalist for 15 years at L'Écho du Nord.

In the 2012 election, he ran in the new riding of Saint-Jérôme but lost to the CAQ.
