= Nicole Loiselle =

Canadian politician

MNA for Saint-Henri
- In office 1989–1994
- Preceded by: Roma Hains
- Succeeded by: Riding dissolved

MNA for Saint-Henri–Sainte-Anne
- In office 1994–2007
- Preceded by: Riding created
- Succeeded by: Marguerite Blais

Personal details
- Born: March 8, 1954 (age 72) Montreal. Quebec, Canada
- Party: Liberal
- Occupation: Real estate agent, political assistant

Nicole Loiselle (born March 8, 1954) is a Canadian politician. She represented the electoral districts of Saint-Henri from 1989 to 1994 and Saint-Henri–Sainte-Anne in the National Assembly of Quebec from 1994 to 2007 as a member of the Quebec Liberal Party. Loiselle was born in Montreal, Quebec. Prior to entering electoral politics, Loiselle was a departmental assistant to federal Members of Parliament Don Johnston from 1980 to 1984 and David Berger from 1984 to 1988. She then became president of her own real estate firm.
