= Denis Chalifoux (politician) =

Canadian politician

Denis Chalifoux (born November 9, 1955) is a Quebec politician. He was a member of the National Assembly of Quebec from 1997 to 1998.

He was elected in a by-election in Bertrand for the Quebec Liberal Party on October 6, 1997. However, he was defeated in the 1998 Quebec election.

He was a city councillor in Sainte-Agathe-des-Monts, Quebec from 1990 to 1997, and in 2009 was elected mayor. He served as mayor until 2021.
