= Claude Cousineau =

Canadian politician and teacher

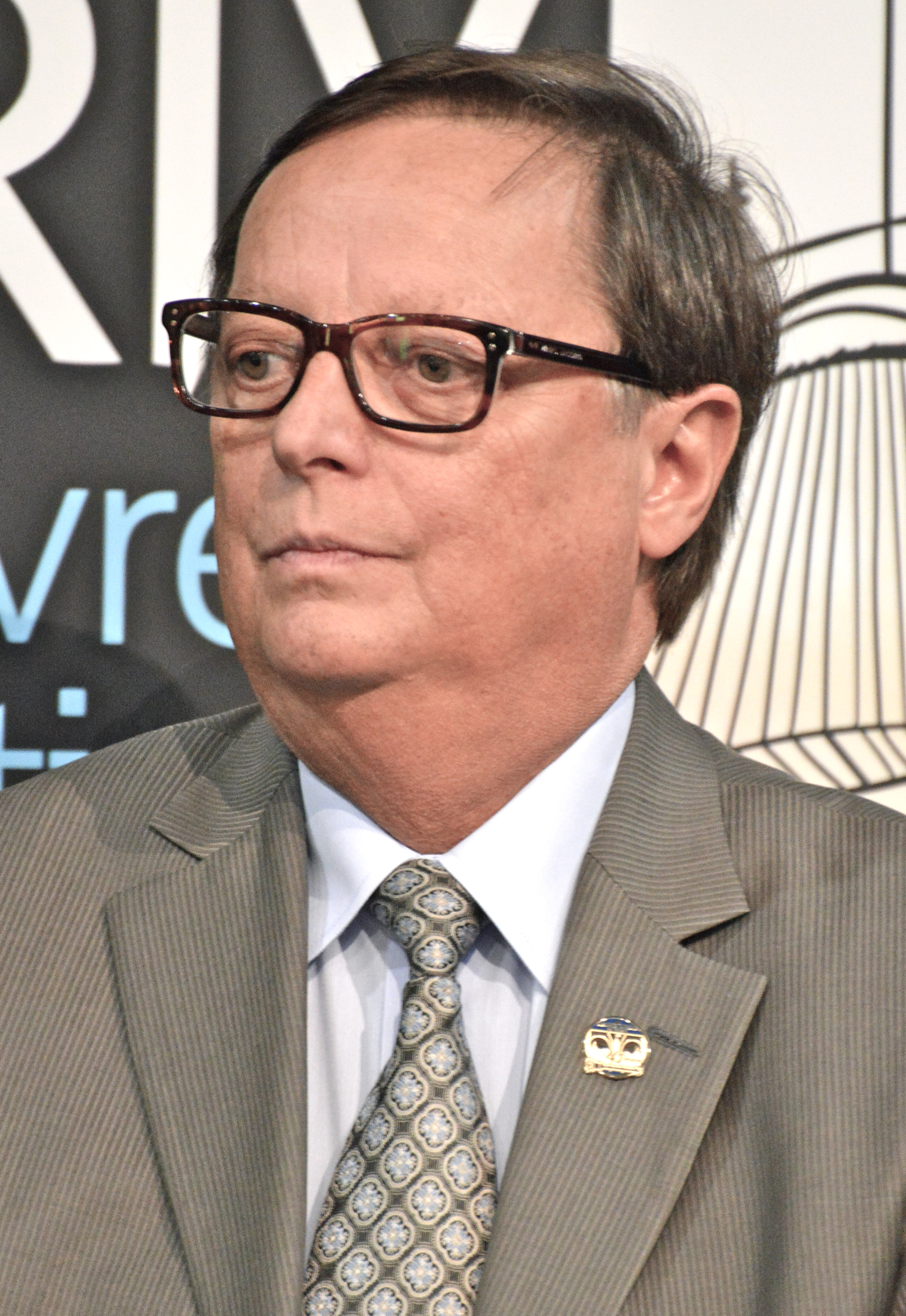

Member of the National Assembly of Quebec for Bertrand
- In office November 30, 1998 – August 29, 2018
- Preceded by: Denis Chalifoux
- Succeeded by: Nadine Girault

Personal details
- Born: February 20, 1950 (age 76) Montreal, Quebec
- Party: Parti Québécois
- Profession: Teacher
- Portfolio: Research, development and technology innovation

Claude Cousineau (born February 20, 1950, in Montreal, Quebec) is a Canadian politician and teacher, who represented the constituency of Bertrand in the National Assembly as a member of the Parti Québécois from 1998 to 2018.

Cousineau studied at the Université du Québec à Montréal and obtained a bachelor's degree in cellular and molecular biology. He also received a certificate in education at the same university. He was a teacher from 1975 to 1978 at a secondary school in Montreal and a science and mathematics teacher at Collège Charles-Lemoyne between 1978 and 1985. He was a program coordinator for three years at the same college and was the general manager of the Académie Laurentienne located near Sainte-Adèle in the Laurentians.

He was also the mayor and councillor of the town of Sainte-Lucie-des-Laurentides. He was mayor of the municipality from 1989 to 1998 and was also the chairman in 1982 of an urban planning commission. He was involved in the economic development in the Laurentians region particularly in Municipalité régionale de comté (MRC) des Laurentides in which he served as warden and was president of a regional economic development corporation in 1996. He was also a board member of the Québec Regional County Municipality Association.

Cousineau entered politics in 1998 where he was elected the MNA in Bertrand in the northern Laurentians. He was the Parliamentary Secretary (Assistant) to the State Minister for Municipal Affairs, the State Minister for Health and Social services, the State Minister of Economic Development and the Minister of Finance during his mandate. When the Parti Québécois lost to the Liberals in 2003, he was re-elected and was named the critic for research, science and technology in 2003 and in innovation in 2005. He was re-elected for a third term in 2007, a fourth in 2012.
