= Martin Camirand =

Canadian politician (born 1965)

MNA for Prévost
- In office April 25, 2007 – November 5, 2008
- Preceded by: Lucie Papineau
- Succeeded by: Gilles Robert

Personal details
- Born: April 3, 1965 (age 61) Saint-Jérôme, Quebec, Canada
- Party: Action démocratique du Québec
- Spouse: Christine Brunette

Martin Camirand (born April 3, 1965) is a politician from Quebec, Canada. He was an Action démocratique du Québec (ADQ) Member of the National Assembly for the electoral district of Prévost from 2007 to 2008.

== Biography ==
Born on April 3, 1965, in Saint-Jérôme, Quebec, Camirand obtained a bachelor's degree in ecology after studies at the Université du Québec à Montréal and became a technician in physical sciences, chemistry and biology for 20 years at the Polyvalente Saint-Jérôme and also served as a coach of an elite league hockey club.

He served as city councillor in Bellefeuille from 1999 to 2001 and in Saint-Jérôme from 2001 to his election at the legislature and was a member of the executive committee in the amalgamated city.

Camirand was nominated as an ADQ candidate in the 2007 election, after Christian Raymond's candidacy was dismissed by his own party. Raymond had made a controversial statement about immigrants to the local media.

Camirand was elected to represent the district of Prévost with 39% of the vote. Parti Québécois incumbent Lucie Papineau finished a close second with 37% of the vote. Camirand took office on April 12, 2007.

Camirand was defeated when he ran for re-election in 2008.
