= Lucie Papineau =

Canadian politician

MNA for Prévost
- In office 1997–2007
- Preceded by: Daniel Paillé
- Succeeded by: Martin Camirand

Personal details
- Born: November 19, 1946 (age 79) Laval-des-Rapides, Quebec, Canada
- Party: Parti Québécois

Lucie Papineau (born November 19, 1946) is a former Canadian politician who represented the riding of Prévost in the National Assembly of Quebec from 1997 to 2007. She was a member of the Parti Québécois.

The daughter of Philippe Papineau and Pauline Descarie, she was born in Laval-des-Rapides, Quebec. Papineau was elected to the National Assembly in a 1997 by-election, following the resignation of Daniel Paillé. She served until the 2007 election, when she was defeated by Martin Camirand of the ADQ.

After leaving politics, Papineau served as head of the board of directors for the Centre résidentiel communautaire Curé-Labelle and as a member of the board of directors for the Maison de soins palliatifs Rivière-du-Nord. From 2012 to 2013, she was chief of staff for the Quebec Minister of Families.
