= Marguerite Blais =

Canadian politician (born 1950)

The Honourable Marguerite Blais
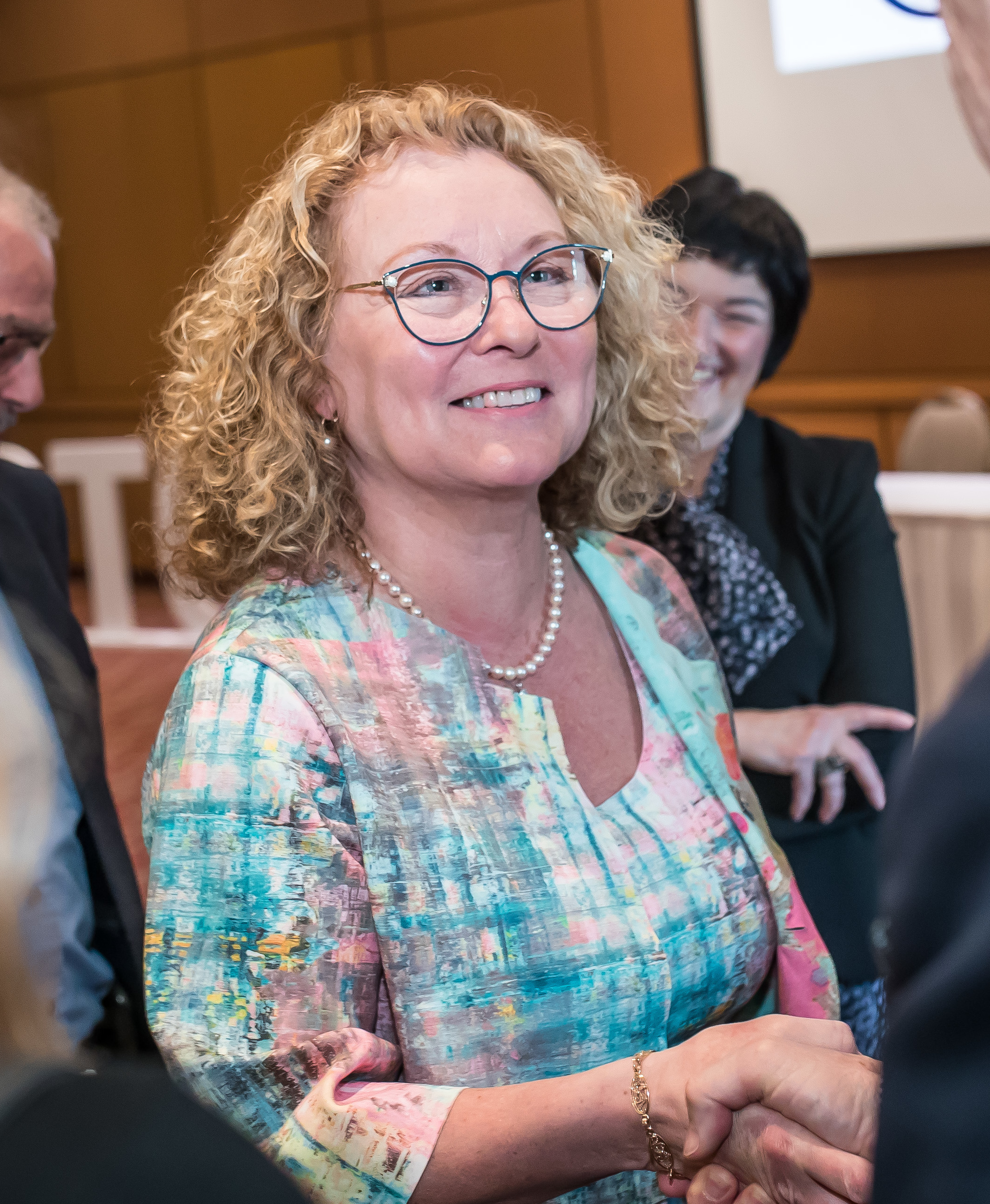
- Blais in 2019

Member of the National Assembly of Quebec for Prévost
- In office October 1, 2018 – August 28, 2022
- Preceded by: Riding re-established
- Succeeded by: Sonia Bélanger

Member of the National Assembly of Quebec for Saint-Henri–Sainte-Anne
- In office April 25, 2007 – August 20, 2015
- Preceded by: Nicole Loiselle
- Succeeded by: Dominique Anglade

Personal details
- Born: Marie Josephine Marguerite Blais; September 12, 1950 (age 76) Montreal, Quebec, Canada
- Party: Coalition Avenir Québec
- Other political affiliations: Quebec Liberal Party (2007–2015)
- Spouse: Jean-Guy Faucher (m. 1978; died 2015)
- Profession: Journalist, radio and TV host

Marie Josephine Marguerite Blais (French pronunciation: [maʁɡəʁit blɛ]; born September 12, 1950) is a Canadian politician, journalist, radio host and television host from Quebec. She was a Coalition Avenir Québec (CAQ) member of the National Assembly of Quebec (MNA) and a previous Minister Responsible for Seniors and Informal Caregivers and a member of the Comité ministériel des services aux citoyens. She was a Liberal MNA for the electoral division of Saint-Henri–Sainte-Anne in Montreal from 2007 to 2015, and served as the Minister Responsible for Seniors, vice-chair of the Comité ministériel du développement social, éducatif et culturel, and a member of the Conseil du trésor.

== Biography ==
Blais did graduate studies in piano and organ at the Conservatoire de musique du Québec. After a few years spent teaching music to kindergarten students (1968–1971), she entered the world of communications, acquiring a master's degree (Université du Québec à Montréal, 1997), a doctorate (Université du Québec à Montréal, Université de Montréal and Concordia University, 2005) and a postdoctorate (Université du Québec à Montréal, 2008). She has some thirty years' experience as a radio and television host and journalist (1971–2002).

From 1996 to 2003, Blais was the director general of the Fondation du maire de Montréal pour la jeunesse. She was president of the Conseil de la famille et de l'enfance (2003-2007). She joined a number of charitable organizations (Centraide, Little Brothers of the Poor, World Vision for Africa) and worked within a number of groups that assist young people, the elderly and the underprivileged in our society, with a particular focus on the deaf community and persons with hearing disabilities.

She was elected in 2007, and was re-elected in 2008, 2012 and 2014.

She announced her resignation from the legislature in August 2015, several months after the death of her husband. On May 8, 2018, she was rumored to come back into politics under the Coalition Avenir Québec, opposing her former party. She ran in the 2018 election in the riding of Prévost and won.

== Publications ==
- Author - Quand les Sourds nous font signe : histoires de sourds, éditions Dauphin Blanc (2003)
- Author - La culture sourde : Quête identitaires au coeur de la communication, Les Presses de l'Université Laval, collection Sociologie au coin de la Rue (2006)
- Co-Author - Apprendre à vivre aux frontières des cultures sourdes et entendantes, Les Presses de l'Université Laval, co-auteur monsieur Jacques Rhéaume (2009)

Quebec provincial government of Jean Charest
Cabinet post (1)
| Predecessor | Office | Successor |
|---|---|---|
| Carole Théberge | Minister responsible for Seniors; April 18, 2007–September 19, 2012 | Réjean Hébert |
