= Taillon =

Provincial electoral district in Quebec, Canada

Coordinates: 45.555°N 73.457°W

Quebec electoral district
- Location in Longueuil

Provincial electoral district
- Legislature: National Assembly of Quebec
MNA
Sandra Hernández
Parti Québécois
- District created: 1965
- First contested: 1966
- Last contested: 2026

Demographics
- Population (2006): 74,995
- Electors (2012): 50,864
- Area (km²): 34.7
- Pop. density (per km²): 2,161.2
- Census division: Longueuil (part)
- Census subdivision: Longueuil (part)

Taillon (French pronunciation: [tajɔ̃]) is a provincial electoral district in the Montérégie region of Quebec, Canada, that elects members to the National Assembly of Quebec. It comprises part of the borough of Le Vieux-Longueuil of the city of Longueuil.

It was created for the 1966 election from Verchères and Chambly electoral districts.

It was named after former Quebec Premier Louis-Olivier Taillon who was in power for four days in 1886 and from 1892 to 1896. It is best known as the riding of Parti Québécois founder René Lévesque, who served as premier from 1976 to 1985.

For the better part of four decades after the PQ seized it in 1976, Taillon was a stronghold for both the PQ and the sovereigntist cause. In the 1995 Quebec referendum it voted 61% for Quebec to separate. However, in 2018, the Coalition Avenir Québec narrowly won it amid its near-sweep of Montérégie.

== Members of the Legislative Assembly / National Assembly ==
This riding has elected the following members of the National Assembly:

Legislature	Years	Member	Party
Riding created from Verchères and Chambly
28th	1966–1970	Guy Leduc	Liberal
29th	1970–1973	Guy Leduc	Liberal
30th	1973–1975	Guy Leduc	Liberal
30th	1975–1976	Guy Leduc	Independent
31st	1976–1981	René Lévesque	Parti Québécois
32nd	1981–1985	René Lévesque	Parti Québécois
33rd	1985–1989	Claude Filion	Parti Québécois
34th	1989–1994	Pauline Marois	Parti Québécois
35th	1994–1998	Pauline Marois	Parti Québécois
36th	1998–2003	Pauline Marois	Parti Québécois
37th	2003–2006	Pauline Marois	Parti Québécois
37th	2006–2007	Marie Malavoy	Parti Québécois
38th	2007–2008	Marie Malavoy	Parti Québécois
39th	2008–2012	Marie Malavoy	Parti Québécois
40th	2012–2014	Marie Malavoy	Parti Québécois
41st	2014–2018	Diane Lamarre	Parti Québécois
42nd	2018–2022	Lionel Carmant	Coalition Avenir Québec
43rd	2022–2025	Lionel Carmant	Coalition Avenir Québec
43rd	2025–2026	Lionel Carmant	Independent
43rd	2026–2026	Lionel Carmant	Coalition Avenir Québec
44th	2026–Present	Sandra Hernández	Parti Québécois

== Election results ==
2026 Quebec general election
** Preliminary results — Not yet official **
Party	Candidate	Votes	%	±%
Parti Québécois	Sandra Hernández	11,326	32.11	
Liberal	Boubacar Camara	9,279	26.31	
Coalition Avenir Québec	Stéphane Lavoie	5,460	15.48	
Québec solidaire	David Lalumière	5,284	14.98	
Conservative	Samuel Bérubé	3,599	10.20	
Parti nul	Samuel Pignedoli	320	0.91	
Total valid votes				
Total rejected ballots				
Turnout			68.40	
Electors on the lists			–	–
Parti Québécois gain from Coalition Avenir Québec		Swing		+
Source: Élections Québec

2022 Quebec general election
Party	Candidate	Votes	%	±%
Coalition Avenir Québec	Lionel Carmant	14,635	41.5	+7.7
Parti Québécois	Andrée-Anne Bouvette-Turcot	7,160	20.3	-7.8
Québec solidaire	Manon Blanchard	6,663	18.9	+1.2
Liberal	Omar Cissé	4,096	11.6	-5.1
Conservative	Pierre-Marc Boyer	2,280	6.5	+5.9
Climat Québec	Frédéric Ouellet	336	1.0	–
L'Union fait la force	Pierre Savignac	86	0.2	–
Total valid votes			–	
Total rejected ballots			–	
Turnout				
Electors on the lists			–	–

2018 Quebec general election
Party	Candidate	Votes	%	±%
Coalition Avenir Québec	Lionel Carmant	12,186	33.76	+9.54
Parti Québécois	Diane Lamarre	10,138	28.08	-5.72
Québec solidaire	Manon Blanchard	6,382	17.68	+6.57
Liberal	Mohammed Barhone	6,042	16.74	-13.24
Green	Mel-Lyna Cadieux Walker	766	2.12	
New Democratic	Jonathan Leduc	349	0.97	
Conservative	Gerardin Verty	235	0.65	
Total valid votes		36,098	98.38	
Total rejected ballots		595	1.62	
Turnout		36,693	69.12	
Eligible voters		53,083		
Coalition Avenir Québec gain from Parti Québécois		Swing		+7.63
Source(s) "Rapport des résultats officiels du scrutin". Élections Québec.

2012 Quebec general election
Party	Candidate	Votes	%	±%
Parti Québécois	Marie Malavoy	15,508	40.21	-6.14
Coalition Avenir Québec	Pierre Cimoné	10,772	27.93	+15.94
Liberal	Marie-Ève Pelletier	7,470	19.37	-13.6
Québec solidaire	Manon Blanchard	2,874	7.25	+3.21
Option nationale	Julien-Alexandre Bilodeau	932	2.42	–
Green	Carole Mainville Bériault	590	1.53	-1.84
Independent	Robert Morin	183	0.47	–
Coalition pour la Constituante	Marie-Noelle Mondoux-Lemoine	175	0.45	–
Marxist–Leninist	Normand Fournier	65	0.17	–

2008 Quebec general election
Party	Candidate	Votes	%	±%
Parti Québécois	Marie Malavoy	15,031	46.35	+10.88
Liberal	Richard Bélisle	10,691	32.97	+9.97
Action démocratique	Karine Simard	3,889	11.99	-19.81
Québec solidaire	Manon Blanchard	1,374	4.24	-0.49
Green	Simon Bernier	1,094	3.37	-1.62
Parti indépendantiste	Éric Tremblay	349	1.08	–

2007 Quebec general election
Party	Candidate	Votes	%	±%
Parti Québécois	Marie Malavoy	14,040	35.47	-8.11
Action démocratique	Karine Simard	12,588	31.80	+18.33
Liberal	Anne Pâquet	9,104	23.00	-8.29
Green	Jonathan Mortreux	1,977	4.99	+1.97
Québec solidaire	Manon Blanchard	1,873	4.73	-2.47

Taillon by-election, August 14, 2006
Party	Candidate	Votes	%	±%
Parti Québécois	Marie Malavoy	8,309	43.58	-2.19
Liberal	Véronique Mercier	5,966	31.29	-2.88
Action démocratique	Karine Simard	2,569	13.47	-3.13
Québec solidaire	Manon Blanchard	1,373	7.20	+5.77*
Green	Yvon Rudolphe	575	3.02	-
Independent	Tristan Dénommée Pigeon	143	0.75	-
Bloc Pot	Francis Beuzart	133	0.70	-0.78

* Increase is from UFP

2003 Quebec general election
Party	Candidate	Votes	%	±%
Parti Québécois	Pauline Marois	17,603	45.85	-7.17
Liberal	Annie Evrard	13,120	34.17	+3.16
Action démocratique	Karine Simard	6,353	16.55	+1.82
Bloc Pot	David Fiset	556	1.45	–
UFP	Gabriel Landry	545	1.42	–
Independent	Xavier Rochon	216	0.56	–
Total valid votes		38,393	98.51	
Rejected and declined votes		580	1.49	
Turnout		38,973	71.02	-6.93
Electors on the lists		54,874		

1998 Quebec general election
Party	Candidate	Votes	%	±%
Parti Québécois	Pauline Marois	21,154	53.02	-7.97
Liberal	Nicole Bourget Laramée	12,372	31.01	-3.84
Action démocratique	Manon Bezeau	5,877	14.73	-
Socialist Democracy	Pascal Durand	345	0.86	-
Innovator	Monique Murray	147	0.37	-

1995 Quebec referendum
Side	Votes	%
Oui	28,604	60.91
Non	18,360	39.09

1994 Quebec general election
Party	Candidate	Votes	%	±%
Parti Québécois	Pauline Marois	23,315	60.99	+5.07
Liberal	Philippe Angers	13,321	34.85	-2.15
Natural Law	René-William Roy	844	2.21	-
Sovereignty	Réal Pineault	746	1.95	-

1989 Quebec general election
Party	Candidate	Votes	%	±%
Parti Québécois	Pauline Marois	18,983	55.92	+5.44
Liberal	Rodrigue Dubé	12,562	37.00	-6.94
Green	Richard Briggs	1,362	4.01	-
New Democrat	Marc Vachon	508	1.50	-1.14
Workers	Marie-Claire Ferland	302	0.89	-
Parti indépendantiste	Erich Laforest	232	0.68	-0.71

1985 Quebec general election
Party	Candidate	Votes	%	±%
Parti Québécois	Claude Filion	15,154	50.48	-17.11
Liberal	Ginette Desjardins Olivier	13,191	43.94	+14.12
New Democrat	Jean-Serge Baribeau	791	2.64	-
Parti indépendantiste	Michel Milette	418	1.39	-
Union Nationale	Jean-Paul Paré	285	0.95	-0.99
Christian Socialist	François Séguin	91	0.30	-
United Social Credit	Michel Bilodeau	91	0.30	+0.19

1981 Quebec general election
Party	Candidate	Votes	%	±%
Parti Québécois	René Lévesque	21,535	67.59	+4.94
Liberal	Lawrence R. Wilson	9,500	29.82	+8.22
Union Nationale	Luc Gadoury	619	1.94	-9.43
Independent	Pierre Arnault	69	0.22	-
Workers Communist	Suzanne Ouellet	68	0.21	-
United Social Credit	Gaétan Bernard	36	0.11	-3.80
People's Front	Yves Boyer	36	0.11	-

1980 Quebec referendum
Side	Votes	%
Oui	31,997	50.99
Non	30,752	49.01

1976 Quebec general election
Party	Candidate	Votes	%	±%
Parti Québécois	René Lévesque	34,098	62.65	+17.45
Liberal	Fernand Blanchard	11,753	21.60	-25.06
Union Nationale	John E. de Souza	6,189	11.37	+9.97
Ralliement créditiste	Henri Bourassa	2,129	3.91	-2.57
New Democrat	Jacques Beaudoin	256	0.47	-

1973 Quebec general election
Party	Candidate	Votes	%	±%
Liberal	Guy Leduc	18,346	46.66	+4.03
Parti Québécois	Guy Bisaillon	17,769	45.20	+16.42
Parti créditiste	Bernard-E. Laplante	2,546	6.48	-0.82
Union Nationale	Marcel Marcoux	550	1.40	-11.51
Independent	Jean-Paul Paré	103	0.26	-

1970 Quebec general election
Party	Candidate	Votes	%	±%
Liberal	Guy Leduc	16,501	42.63	+4.02
Parti Québécois	Jacques-Yvon Lefebvre	11,138	28.78	-
Union Nationale	Jacques Johnson	4,997	12.91	-24.76
Independent	Serge Mongeau	2,998	7.75	-
Ralliement créditiste	Jean-P. Bernier	2,826	7.30	-
Independent	Gaston Gobeil	134	0.35	-
Independent	Robert Meunier	113	0.29	-

1966 Quebec general election
Party	Candidate	Votes	%
Liberal	Guy Leduc	8,627	38.61
Union Nationale	Paul-Émile Labrosse	8,417	37.67
RIN	Jacques Ferron	4,097	18.34
Ralliement national	Robert Tremblay	685	3.07
Independent	Gaston Prévost	517	2.31

== See also ==
- List of Quebec provincial electoral districts
- Canadian provincial electoral districts
