= Prévost (electoral district) =

Provincial electoral district in Quebec, Canada

Quebec electoral district

Provincial electoral district
- Legislature: National Assembly of Quebec
MNA
Anne Nguyen
Parti Québécois
- District created: 1972
- First contested: 1973
- Last contested: 2026

Demographics
- Electors (2008): 59,502
- Area (km²): 127.22
- Census division: La Rivière-du-Nord
- Census subdivision(s): Piedmont, Prévost, Sainte-Anne-des-Lacs, Sainte-Sophie, Saint-Hippolyte, Saint-Sauveur

Prévost (French pronunciation: [pʁevo]) is a provincial electoral district in the Laurentides region of Quebec, Canada, which elects one member to the National Assembly of Quebec. It notably includes the municipality of Sainte-Sophie. Since 2026 its member of the National Assembly (MNA) has been Anne Nguyen of the Parti Québécois (PQ).

It was created for the 1973 election from parts of Montcalm and Terrebonne districts. Its final election was in 2008. It disappeared in the 2012 election and the successor electoral district was Saint-Jérôme.

As of its final election, it consisted of the municipalities of Prévost and Saint-Jérôme. In the change from the 2001 to the 2011 electoral map, the eponymous municipality of Prévost moved from the defunct Prévost electoral district to the Bertrand electoral district; the remaining municipality of Saint-Jérôme then became a separate new electoral district in its own right, named Saint-Jérôme.

The district was reconstituted for the 2018 election, with its territory consisting of the municipalities of Prévost, Sainte-Anne-des-Lacs, Sainte-Sophie, Saint-Hippolyte, Saint-Sauveur and Piedmont.

The riding was named after the Prévost family, a regional family in which several members were elected to the National Assembly.

== Members of the National Assembly ==
Legislature	Years	Member	Party
Riding created from Montcalm and Terrebonne
30th	1973–1976	Bernard Parent	Liberal
31st	1976–1979	Jean-Guy Cardinal	Parti Québécois
31st	1979–1981	Solange Chaput-Rolland	Liberal
32nd	1981–1985	Robert Dean	Parti Québécois
33rd	1985–1989	Paul-André Forget	Liberal
34th	1989–1994	Paul-André Forget	Liberal
35th	1994–1996	Daniel Paillé	Parti Québécois
35th	1997–1998	Lucie Papineau	Parti Québécois
36th	1998–2003	Lucie Papineau	Parti Québécois
37th	2003–2007	Lucie Papineau	Parti Québécois
38th	2007–2008	Martin Camirand	Action démocratique
39th	2008–2012	Gilles Robert	Parti Québécois
Dissolved into Saint-Jérôme
Re-created from Bertrand and Rousseau
42nd	2018–2022	Marguerite Blais	Coalition Avenir Québec
43rd	2022–2026	Sonia Bélanger	Coalition Avenir Québec
44th	2026–Present	Anne Nguyen	Parti Québécois

== Election results ==
=== Prévost, 2018–present ===
2026 Quebec general election
** Preliminary results — Not yet official **
Party	Candidate	Votes	%	±%
Parti Québécois	Anne Nguyen	14,554	38.61	
Conservative	Joyce Sauriol	7,365	19.54	
Coalition Avenir Québec	Sonia Bélanger	6,585	17.47	
Liberal	Paul Landry	5,941	15.76	
Québec solidaire	Alix Gravel	3,085	8.18	
Démocratie directe	Sabine Groulx	165	0.44	
Total valid votes				
Total rejected ballots				
Turnout			71.70	
Electors on the lists			–	–
Parti Québécois gain from Coalition Avenir Québec		Swing		+
Source: Élections Québec

2022 Quebec general election
Party	Candidate	Votes	%	±%
Coalition Avenir Québec	Sonia Bélanger	15,903	46.23	
Parti Québécois	Thérèse Chabot	6,737	19.58	
Québec solidaire	Rose Crevier-Dagenais	5,196	15.10	
Conservative	Benoit Cloutier	4,019	11.68	
Liberal	Suzanne Pomerleau	2,072	6.02	
Green	Michelle Vaz	374	1.09	–
Parti humain	Michel Leclerc	100	0.39	–
Total valid votes		34,401	98.76	–
Total rejected ballots		431	1.24	–
Turnout		34,832	69.37	
Electors on the lists		50,213	–	–

2018 Quebec general election
Party	Candidate	Votes	%	±%
Coalition Avenir Québec	Marguerite Blais	14,876	47.03	
Parti Québécois	Paul St-Pierre Plamondon	7,739	24.47	
Québec solidaire	Lucie Mayer	4,414	13.96	
Liberal	Naömie Goyette	4,063	12.85	
Conservative	Malcolm Mulcahy	303	0.96	
Parti libre	Michel Leclerc	235	0.74	
Total valid votes		31,630	98.51	
Total rejected ballots		477	1.49	
Turnout		32,107	70.80	
Eligible voters		45,347		
Source(s) "Rapport des résultats officiels du scrutin". Élections Québec.

=== Prévost, 1973–2012 ===
2008 Quebec general election
Party	Candidate	Votes	%	±%
Parti Québécois	Gilles Robert	15,229	44.22	+6.89
Liberal	Jacques Gariepy	10,001	29.04	+9.56
Action démocratique	Martin Camirand	7,193	20.88	-18.43
Québec solidaire	Lise Boivin	1,107	3.21	-0.67
Green	Bernard Anton	913	2.65	–

2007 Quebec general election
Party	Candidate	Votes	%	±%
Action démocratique	Martin Camirand	15,999	39.31	
Parti Québécois	Lucie Papineau	15,191	37.33	
Liberal	Richard Bélisle	7,929	19.48	
Québec solidaire	Mylène Jacoud	1,578	3.88	

== See also ==
- List of Quebec provincial electoral districts
- Canadian provincial electoral districts
