= Bertrand (electoral district) =

Provincial electoral district in Quebec, Canada

Coordinates: 46.10°N 74.17°W

Quebec electoral district

Provincial electoral district
- Legislature: National Assembly of Quebec
MNA
Alexandre Girard-Duchaine
Parti Québécois
- District created: 1992
- First contested: 1994
- Last contested: 2026

Demographics
- Population (2011): 69,765
- Electors (2012): 56,544
- Area (km²): 1,955.2
- Pop. density (per km²): 35.7
- Census division(s): La Rivière-du-Nord (part), Les Laurentides (part), Les Pays-d'en-Haut (part), Matawinie (part)
- Census subdivision(s): Entrelacs, Estérel, Ivry-sur-le-Lac, Lantier, Notre-Dame-de-la-Merci, Piedmont, Prévost, Sainte-Adèle, Sainte-Agathe-des-Monts, Sainte-Anne-des-Lacs, Saint-Donat, Sainte-Lucie-des-Laurentides, Sainte-Marguerite-du-Lac-Masson, Saint-Sauveur, Val-David, Val-des-Lacs, Val-Morin; Doncaster; Lac-des-Dix-Milles

Bertrand (French pronunciation: [bɛʁtʁɑ̃]) is a provincial electoral district in the Lanaudière and Laurentides regions of Quebec, Canada, which elects a member to the National Assembly of Quebec. It is not to be confused with the former, entirely different Bertrand electoral district located in the Montérégie region, which existed from 1981 to 1994; they used the same name but otherwise have nothing in common.

It was created for the 1994 election from parts of Labelle, Prévost, and Rousseau. It notably includes the municipalities of Saint-Adele, Rawdon, and Sainte-Agathe-des-Monts.

In the change from the 2001 to the 2011 electoral map, it lost Chertsey and Saint-Hippolyte to Rousseau electoral district and gained Prévost from Prévost electoral district, which became defunct.

In the change from the 2011 to 2017 electoral map, the riding lost Piedmont, Prévost, Sainte-Anne-des-Lacs, Saint-Sauveur to the new riding of Prévost and gained Chertsey and Rawdon from Rousseau.

It is named after former Union Nationale and Quebec premier Jean-Jacques Bertrand who was in power from 1968 to 1970 after the death of Daniel Johnson.

== Members of the National Assembly ==
Legislature	Years	Member	Party
Riding created from Labelle, Prévost and Rousseau
35th	1994–1997	Robert Thérien	Liberal
35th	1997–1998	Denis Chalifoux	Liberal
36th	1998–2003	Claude Cousineau	Parti Québécois
37th	2003–2007	Claude Cousineau	Parti Québécois
38th	2007–2008	Claude Cousineau	Parti Québécois
39th	2008–2012	Claude Cousineau	Parti Québécois
40th	2012–2014	Claude Cousineau	Parti Québécois
41st	2014–2018	Claude Cousineau	Parti Québécois
42nd	2018–2022	Nadine Girault	Coalition Avenir Québec
43rd	2022–2026	France-Élaine Duranceau	Coalition Avenir Québec
44th	2026–Present	Alexandre Girard-Duchaine	Parti Québécois

== Election results ==
2026 Quebec general election
** Preliminary results — Not yet official **
Party	Candidate	Votes	%	±%
Parti Québécois	Alexandre Girard-Duchaine	15,768	39.88	+19.25
Coalition Avenir Québec	France-Élaine Duranceau	7,362	18.62	–26.64
Conservative	Éliot Gallant	5,746	14.53	+4.74
Liberal	Felipe Morales	5,603	14.17	+8.16
Québec solidaire	Nataël Bureau	4,550	11.51	–4.64
Présence	Guillaume Tremblay	323	0.82	N/A
Démocratie directe	Jonathan Godin	183	0.46	N/A
Total valid votes		39,535	98.58	–0.16
Total rejected ballots		570	1.42	+0.16
Turnout		40,105	66.75	+1.98
Electors on the lists		60,079		
Parti Québécois gain from Coalition Avenir Québec		Swing		+22.95
Source: Élections Québec

2022 Quebec general election
Party	Candidate	Votes	%	±%
Coalition Avenir Québec	France-Élaine Duranceau	15,927	45.26	+3.71
Parti Québécois	Guillaume Freire	7,259	20.63	–2.78
Québec solidaire	Julie Francoeur	5,682	16.15	–1.97
Conservative	Philippe Meloni	3,444	9.79	+9.01
Liberal	André Nadeau	2,115	6.01	–7.39
Green	Karine Steinberger	448	1.27	–0.57
Parti humain	Marie-Eve Ouellette	162	0.46	–
Climat Québec	Samuel Fortin	151	0.43	–
Total valid votes		35,188	98.74	+0.30
Total rejected ballots		448	1.26	–0.30
Turnout		35,636	64.77	–2.83
Electors on the lists		55,022	–	–

2018 Quebec general election
Party	Candidate	Votes	%	±%
Coalition Avenir Québec	Nadine Girault	13,867	41.55	+14.62
Parti Québécois	Gilbert Lafrenière	7,815	23.41	-13.93
Québec solidaire	Mylène Jaccoud	6,047	18.12	+10.59
Liberal	Diane de Passillé	4,471	13.4	-13.3
Green	Natacha Alarie	613	1.84	
Conservative	Kathy Laframboise	261	0.78	
Citoyens au pouvoir	Benoît Pigeon	197	0.59	
Parti libre	Benoit Martin	107	0.32	
Total valid votes		33,378	98.44	
Total rejected ballots		530	1.56	
Turnout		33,908	67.60	
Eligible voters		50,158		
Coalition Avenir Québec gain from Parti Québécois		Swing		+14.28
Source(s) "Rapport des résultats officiels du scrutin". Élections Québec.

2014 Quebec general election
Party	Candidate	Votes	%	±%
Parti Québécois	Claude Cousineau	15,232	37.34	-4.35
Coalition Avenir Québec	Robert Milot	10,985	26.93	-4.97
Liberal	Isabelle Leblond	10,892	26.70	+9.39
Québec solidaire	Lucie Mayer	3,070	7.53	+2.17
Parti nul	Patrick Dubé	305	0.75	-
Option nationale	Dianne Massicotte	199	0.49	-1.21
Independent	Mario Roy	111	0.27	-
Total valid votes		40,794	98.65	
Total rejected ballots		559	1.35	+0.46
Turnout		41,353	71.10	-6.63
Electors on the lists		58,161	–	
Parti Québécois hold		Swing		+0.31

2014 source:

2012 Quebec general election
Party	Candidate	Votes	%	±%
Parti Québécois	Claude Cousineau	18,305	41.69	
Coalition Avenir Québec	Jean-Marc Lacoste	14,005	31.89	
Liberal	Yannick Ouellette	7,602	17.31	
Québec solidaire	Lise Boivin	2,351	5.35	
Option nationale	Samuelle Ducrocq-Henry	744	1.69	
Green	Marc St-Germain	682	1.55	
Coalition pour la constituante	Patrick Dubé	222	0.51	
Total valid votes		43,911	99.11	
Total rejected ballots		394	0.89	
Turnout		44,305	77.73	
Electors on the lists		57,000	–	

2012 source:

2008 Quebec general election
Party	Candidate	Votes	%	±%
Parti Québécois	Claude Cousineau	15,263	49.12	
Liberal	Isabelle Lord	10,627	34.20	
Action démocratique	Diane Bellemare	3,496	11.25	
Québec solidaire	Mylène Jaccoud	851	2.74	
Green	Michelle L. Déry	834	2.68	–

2007 Quebec general election
Party	Candidate	Votes	%	±%
Parti Québécois	Claude Cousineau	13,672	37.02	
Action démocratique	Sylvain Charron	11,188	30.29	
Liberal	Daniel Desjardins	9,082	24.59	
Green	Richard Savignac	1,766	4.78	–
Québec solidaire	Jocelyne Lavoie	1,228	3.32	

2003 Quebec general election
Party	Candidate	Votes	%	±%
Parti Québécois	Claude Cousineau	14,704	43.33	
Liberal	Michelle Monpetit	13,502	39.79	
Action démocratique	Danielle Tremblay	4,834	14.24	
Green	Richard Savignac	664	1.96	–
Christian Democracy	Serge Haroun	190	0.56	
No Affiliation	David Rovins	41	0.12	

1998 Quebec general election
Party	Candidate	Votes	%	±%
Parti Québécois	Claude Cousineau	15,666	46.63	
Liberal	Denis Chalifoux	13,923	41.44	
Action démocratique	Benoît Martin	3,725	11.09	
Socialist Democracy	Jacques Rose	125	0.37	
Natural Law	Pierre Monpetit	98	0.29	
Independent	David Rovins	59	0.18	

== See also ==
- List of Quebec provincial electoral districts
- Canadian provincial electoral districts
