= Sonia Bélanger =

Canadian politician (born 1961)

Member of the National Assembly of Quebec for Prévost
- In office October 3, 2022 – August 27, 2026
- Preceded by: Marguerite Blais
- Succeeded by: Anne Nguyen

Minister of Health
- In office December 19, 2025 – October 21, 2026
- Preceded by: Christian Dubé
- Succeeded by: Marie-Karlynn Laflamme

Personal details
- Born: 1961 (age 64–65) Rimouski, Quebec, Canada
- Party: Coalition Avenir Québec

Sonia Bélanger (French pronunciation: [sɔnja belɑ̃ʒe]; born 1961) is a Canadian politician who was elected to the National Assembly of Quebec in the 2022 general election. She represented the riding of Prévost as a member of the Coalition Avenir Québec (CAQ) until 2026. She was appointed Minister of Health in 2025.

== Electoral record ==
2026 Quebec general election: Prévost
** Preliminary results — Not yet official **
Party	Candidate	Votes	%	±%
Parti Québécois	Anne Nguyen	14,554	38.61	
Conservative	Joyce Sauriol	7,365	19.54	
Coalition Avenir Québec	Sonia Bélanger	6,585	17.47	
Liberal	Paul Landry	5,941	15.76	
Québec solidaire	Alix Gravel	3,085	8.18	
Démocratie directe	Sabine Groulx	165	0.44	
Total valid votes				
Total rejected ballots				
Turnout			71.70	
Electors on the lists			–	–
Parti Québécois gain from Coalition Avenir Québec		Swing		+
Source: Élections Québec

2022 Quebec general election: Prévost
Party	Candidate	Votes	%	±%
Coalition Avenir Québec	Sonia Bélanger	15,903	46.23	
Parti Québécois	Thérèse Chabot	6,737	19.58	
Québec solidaire	Rose Crevier-Dagenais	5,196	15.10	
Conservative	Benoit Cloutier	4,019	11.68	
Liberal	Suzanne Pomerleau	2,072	6.02	
Green	Michelle Vaz	374	1.09	–
Parti humain	Michel Leclerc	100	0.39	–
Total valid votes		34,401	98.76	–
Total rejected ballots		431	1.24	–
Turnout		34,832	69.37	
Electors on the lists		50,213	–	–
