= Marie Malavoy =

Canadian politician

MNA for Sherbrooke
- In office 1994–1998
- Preceded by: André Hamel
- Succeeded by: Jean Charest

MNA for Taillon
- In office August 14, 2006 – 2014
- Preceded by: Pauline Marois
- Succeeded by: Diane Lamarre

Personal details
- Born: March 23, 1948 (age 78) Berlin, Germany
- Party: Parti Québécois
- Spouse: Louis Racine
- Profession: Teacher
- Portfolio: Education

Marie Malavoy (born March 23, 1948, in Berlin, Germany) is a Canadian politician and teacher. She was a member of the National Assembly of Quebec for the riding of Taillon in the Montérégie region for the Parti Québécois. Following the PQ victory in 2012, Malavoy entered the cabinet as Minister of Education.

== Biography ==
Malavoy attended the Collège Marie de France, earning a bachelor's degree in philosophy. She later attended the Université de Montréal, earning a second bachelor's degree, and later a master's degree in social service, also earning a diploma in pastoral studies. She attended the Université de Sherbrooke and worked there from 1977 to 1992, and from 1999 to 2006 as a teacher, vice-dean and dean of the Faculty of Humanities. In the community, she worked for the Comité de protection de la Jeunesse, the Centre des Services sociaux en Estrie and for several associations promoting social equality and the status and condition of women. She was a member for the No committee for the Charlottetown Accord in 1992. She has been a member of the Parti Québécois since 1979 and was the first vice-president and national executive committee chair of the party from 2000 to 2005.

Malavoy first entered politics in 1994 and was elected in the riding of Sherbrooke where she was briefly the Minister of Culture and Communications in the Jacques Parizeau cabinet. She had to step down from her position on November 25, 1994, as it was found that she had illegally voted during the Quebec Referendum in 1980 as well as other federal and provincial elections since she was not a Canadian citizen at the time. After an eight-year retirement from politics, she was elected in Taillon in a by-election, succeeding the former minister Pauline Marois. She was re-elected in the 2007 elections. After being the critic for municipal affairs during the first parliamentary session, she was named the critic for education after reports that Diane Lemieux, who held the portfolio during the spring session, would retire from politics following a disagreement with Marois, who was named the PQ leader in July 2007.

Political offices
Preceded by Liza Frulla	Minister of Culture and Communications; 1994	Succeeded by Jacques Parizeau
Preceded by Michelle Courchesne	Minister of Education, Sport and Leisure; 2012–2014	Succeeded by Yves Bolduc
