= Parti nationaliste du Québec =

Defunct political party in Canada

- Former federal party
- Leader: Marcel Léger (until May 1984); Denis Monière (after May 1984)
- Founded: 1983
- Dissolved: c. 1987
- Ideology: Social democracy Quebec nationalism Quebec sovereignty
- Colours: Blue

The Parti nationaliste du Québec was a fringe Quebec-based federal political party in Canada, that advocated sovereignty of Quebec and was founded by Parti Québécois (PQ) supporters. Its primary goal was to represent Quebec's interests in Ottawa and serve as a federal wing for the PQ.

== Origins ==
For decades, the Social Credit Party's Quebec wing, the Ralliement créditiste, attracted many Quebec nationalists as a party that could represent Quebec's interests in the House of Commons of Canada. When Créditistes were wiped off the electoral map in 1980 federal election, the political situation seemed favourable for the growth of the Parti nationaliste.

The Parti nationaliste was a successor to the Union Populaire, a party that had little success in the 1979 and 1980 federal elections.

== Beau risque ==
Marcel Léger, who had been the PQ Member of the provincial legislature for the district of LaFontaine since 1970 became the party's first leader on September 14, 1983. He was a former Minister of the Environment who had been dropped from the Cabinet in 1982.

In the aftermath of the 1982 Patriation of the Constitution by the federal government, PQ leader René Lévesque adopted the beau risque strategy and refused to give his blessing to Léger's efforts to establish the Parti nationaliste. Instead, Lévesque backed Brian Mulroney's pledge to have Quebec integrate the Canadian constitution in honour and dignity.

Léger resigned as leader on May 17, 1984, and was succeeded by Denis Monière, a Professor of Political Science who later founded Parti indépendantiste (1985) and is a founding member of Option nationale (2011-2017).

== 1984 election ==
The party ran 74 candidates in the 1984 federal election. All of them ran in Quebec districts and were defeated, including interim leader Denis Monière, who ran in the district of Duvernay.

The party conducted a very modest campaign, lacking financial and human resources. Most PQ supporters voted for the Progressive Conservative Party which won 58 out of Quebec's 75 districts and Mulroney became Prime Minister.

== Decline ==
During the months that followed the 1984 defeat, the PQ dealt with the worst crisis of its existence. Five cabinet members, including Minister of Finance Jacques Parizeau, resigned. The PQ lost the 1985 provincial election. The PQ's misfortunes distracted the Parti nationaliste's supporters. It left them with little time available for federal politics.

Monière went on to help found the Parti indépendantiste in 1985. The Parti indépendantiste was a Quebec provincial party that aimed to attract more radical supporters of the PQ who were disappointed with the beau risque approach.

The Parti nationaliste unsuccessfully ran a candidate in the September 29, 1986 by-election in the district of Saint-Maurice. It ceased to exist soon after.

== Legacy ==
The Parti nationaliste may have provided the groundwork for the subsequent success of the sovereigntist Bloc Québécois (BQ) in federal politics. In 1993, 54 out of the BQ's 75 candidates were elected. Three of them, Antoine Dubé, Réal Ménard and Yves Rocheleau, had run under the Parti nationaliste label nine years earlier.

== See also ==
- List of political parties in Canada
- Secessionist movements of Canada
