= Marcel Léger =

Canadian politician

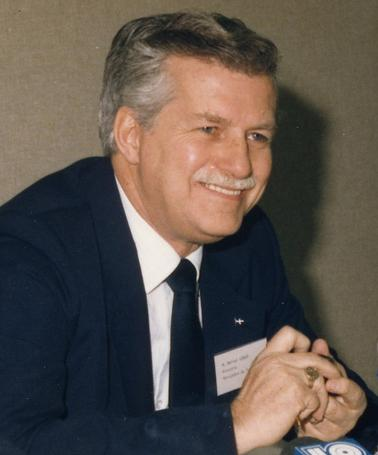

Leader of the Parti nationaliste du Québec
- In office September 14, 1983 – May 17, 1984
- Preceded by: Party formed
- Succeeded by: Denis Monière

Member of the Québec Assembly for LaFontaine
- In office 1970–1985

Québec Minister of Environment
- In office 1976–1982

Personal details
- Born: June 8, 1930
- Died: February 5, 1993 (aged 62)
- Party: Multiple

Marcel Léger (June 8, 1930 – February 5, 1993) was a Canadian politician, Québec sovereignty activist, and businessman. He founded the Canadian polling firm that became Léger Marketing.

== Background ==
Léger was born in Montreal. He is the father of pollster Jean-Marc Léger and former Parti Québécois MNA Nicole Léger.

== Provincial Politics ==
Léger successfully ran as the Parti Québécois candidate in the provincial district of LaFontaine in 1970. He was re-elected in 1973, 1976 and 1981. He became Minister of the Environment in 1976, but was dropped from the Cabinet in 1982.

== Federal Politics ==
Léger was leader of the Parti nationaliste du Québec from September 14, 1983 to May 17, 1984. In that capacity, he tried to establish a federal wing for the Parti Québécois and represent Quebec's interests in Ottawa. However PQ Leader René Lévesque conducted a beau risque policy and refused to endorse Léger's attempt.

== Retirement from politics ==
Léger re-entered the Cabinet as Minister of Tourism in 1984. However he lost his seat in 1985. In 1986, he founded the polling firm "Léger et Léger" (today Léger Marketing).

== Footnotes ==
Political offices
| Preceded by Jean-Paul Beaudry (Union Nationale) | MNA, District of LaFontaine; 1970–1985 | Succeeded by Jean-Claude Gobé (Liberal) |
