= Opinion polling for the 2019 Canadian federal election =

This page provides a list of scientific, nationwide public opinion polls that were conducted from the 2015 Canadian federal election leading up to the 2019 Canadian federal election, which was held on October 21. For riding-specific polls see 2019 constituency polls.

== National polls ==
=== Campaign period ===
Evolution of voting intentions according to polls conducted during the 2019 Canadian federal election campaign, graphed from the data in the table below. Trendlines are local regressions, with polls weighted by proximity in time and a logarithmic function of sample size. 95% confidence ribbons represent uncertainty about the trendlines, not the likelihood that actual election results would fall within the intervals.

Polling firm	Last date of polling^{[1]}	Link	LPC	CPC	NDP	BQ	GPC	PPC	Margin of error^{[2]}	Sample size^{[3]}	Polling method^{[4]}	Lead
2019 election	October 21, 2019	HTML	33.1	34.3	16.0	7.6	6.5	1.6	N/A	18,170,880	N/A	1.2
Nanos Research	October 20, 2019		31.7	32.5	20.8	7.2	6.0	1.5	±3.6 pp	800	telephone	0.8
Mainstreet Research	October 20, 2019		31.6	32.2	18.3	7.9	6.1	2.8	±2.17 pp	2,032	IVR	0.6
Research Co.	October 20, 2019		32	31	19	7	8	2	±3.1 pp	957	online	1
EKOS	October 20, 2019		34.2	30.0	18.3	5.0	8.1	3.5	±2.2 pp	1,994	telephone/IVR	4.2
Campaign Research	October 20, 2019		31.4	31.3	17.8	6.6	9.1	2.7	±1.4 pp	1,498	online (rolling)	0.1
Ipsos	October 19, 2019		31	33	18	7	6	3	±2 pp	3,108	online/telephone	2
Abacus Data	October 19, 2019		34	32	16	8	8	2	±2.1 pp	2,000	online	2
Nanos Research	October 19, 2019		31.0	31.5	18.8	7.0	9.5	1.8	±2.4 pp	1,600 (1/2)	telephone (rolling)	0.5
Campaign Research	October 19, 2019		31.7	31.4	17.4	6.6	9.1	2.7	±1.6 pp	1,554	online (rolling)	0.3
Forum Research	October 18, 2019		31.7	29.9	17.5	9.0	8.3	3.0	±3 pp	1,206	IVR	1.8
Leger	October 18, 2019		33	33	18	8	6	2	±2.13 pp	2,117	online	0
Mainstreet Research	October 18, 2019		32.8	31.9	18.3	7.2	5.5	3.3	±2.11 pp	2,134 (1/3)	IVR (rolling)	0.9
Nanos Research	October 18, 2019		32.6	30.3	18.4	7.1	9.3	1.9	±2.8 pp	1,200 (1/3)	telephone (rolling)	2.3
Campaign Research	October 18, 2019		31	31	18	7	9	3	±2.2 pp	1,987	online	0
Innovative Research	October 17, 2019		33	31	14	9	8	4	N/A	1,964	online	2
Innovative Research	October 17, 2019		34	30	19	6	8	2	N/A	3,094	online	4
EKOS	October 17, 2019		31.0	32.5	17.6	5.5	7.9	3.6	±2.3 pp	1,881	telephone/IVR	1.5
Mainstreet Research	October 17, 2019		32.1	31.9	18.8	7.6	5.8	3.0	±2.11 pp	2,163 (1/3)	IVR (rolling)	0.2
Nanos Research	October 17, 2019		31.5	31.6	19.0	6.2	9.5	1.8	±2.8 pp	1,200 (1/3)	telephone (rolling)	0.1
DART/Maru	October 16, 2019		29	33	21	8	7	2	±2.9 pp	1,518	online	4
Forum Research	October 16, 2019		30	29	20	7	8	4	±3 pp	1,028	IVR	1
Mainstreet Research	October 16, 2019		31.9	30.9	18.6	7.6	7.0	3.2	±2.12 pp	2,128 (1/3)	IVR (rolling)	1.0
Nanos Research	October 16, 2019		31.5	32.5	18.9	6.0	9.2	1.6	±2.8 pp	1,200 (1/3)	telephone (rolling)	1.0
Mainstreet Research	October 15, 2019		30.9	30.6	18.3	7.9	7.7	3.6	±2.15 pp	2,070 (1/3)	IVR (rolling)	0.3
Nanos Research	October 15, 2019		31.9	32.5	18.8	5.9	9.4	1.1	±2.8 pp	1,200 (1/3)	telephone (rolling)	0.6
Angus Reid	October 15, 2019		29	33	19	8	8	3	±2.0 pp	2,100	online	4
EKOS	October 15, 2019		31.2	31.8	18.4	6.4	6.8	3.4	±2.3 pp	1,904	telephone/IVR	0.6
Mainstreet Research	October 14, 2019		30.7	31.1	17.2	8.1	8.5	3.6	±2.15 pp	2,076 (1/3)	IVR (rolling)	0.4
Ipsos	October 13, 2019		30	32	20	7	8	2	±2.4 pp	2,204	online/telephone	2
Mainstreet Research	October 13, 2019		30.7	32.3	16.6	7.8	8.3	3.4	±2.11 pp	2,150	IVR (rolling)	1.6
Nanos Research	October 13, 2019		32.3	32.1	19.2	5.9	9.3	1.0	±2.8 pp	1,200 (1/3)	telephone (rolling)	0.2
Nanos Research	October 12, 2019		31.5	32.3	19.7	6.2	9.0	1.1	±2.8 pp	1,200 (1/3)	telephone (rolling)	0.8
Nanos Research	October 11, 2019		33.2	32.1	18.1	5.9	8.9	1.4	±2.8 pp	1,200 (1/3)	telephone (rolling)	1.1
Abacus Data	October 10, 2019		32	32	18	6	9	2	±1.9 pp	3,000	online	0
Campaign Research	October 10, 2019		29	31	19	7	10	3	±1.54 pp	4,037	online	2
Mainstreet Research	October 10, 2019		28.9	31.7	16.6	7.6	9.4	4.2	±2 pp	2,274 (1/3)	IVR (rolling)	2.8
Nanos Research	October 10, 2019		35.4	33.2	15.3	5.3	8.8	1.4	±2.8 pp	1,200 (1/3)	telephone (rolling)	2.2
Innovative Research	October 10, 2019		35	31	15	6	10	3	N/A	2,394	online	4
Angus Reid	October 10, 2019		29	34	17	7	9	3	±1.8 pp	3,031	online	5
EKOS	October 10, 2019		30.5	31.7	13.1	5.4	12.8	4.7	±2.2 pp	1,947	telephone/IVR	1.2
DART/Maru	October 9, 2019		28	33	20	9	7	2	±3.1 pp	1,510	online	5
Mainstreet Research	October 9, 2019		30.2	32.2	15.1	7.2	9.8	4.0	±2.04 pp	2,309 (1/3)	IVR (rolling)	2.0
Nanos Research	October 9, 2019		36.9	33.2	14.1	5.1	8.2	1.6	±2.8 pp	1,200 (1/3)	telephone (rolling)	3.7
Leger	October 8, 2019		31	31	18	7	11	3	±2.11 pp	2,150	online	0
Forum Research	October 8, 2019		28	35	13	7	12	3	±3 pp	1,013	IVR	7
Mainstreet Research	October 8, 2019		31.7	32.0	14.3	6.1	10.3	4.2	±2 pp	2,445 (1/3)	IVR (rolling)	0.3
Nanos Research	October 8, 2019		35.6	34.8	13.4	5.2	9.1	1.2	±2.8 pp	1,200 (1/3)	telephone (rolling)	0.8
Mainstreet Research	October 7, 2019		32.6	33.1	13.2	6.5	10.1	3.4	±2.11 pp	2,108 (1/3)	IVR (rolling)	0.5
Nanos Research	October 7, 2019		34.6	34.8	13.5	5.1	9.8	1.1	±2.8 pp	1,200 (1/3)	telephone (rolling)	0.2
Ipsos	October 7, 2019		35	34	15	7	7	2	±2.9 pp	1,502	online	1
Innovative Research	October 7, 2019		35	33	13	5	10	4	N/A	2,835	online	2
Mainstreet Research	October 6, 2019		33.1	33.3	13.3	6.3	9.7	2.9	±2.13 pp	2,108	IVR (rolling)	0.2
Nanos Research	October 6, 2019		34.3	33.4	15.0	5.1	9.6	1.5	±2.8 pp	1,200 (1/3)	telephone (rolling)	0.9
Abacus Data	October 5, 2019		35	33	16	5	8	1	±2 pp	1,556	online	2
Nanos Research	October 5, 2019		36.7	32.7	15.0	4.9	8.0	1.8	±2.8 pp	1,200 (1/3)	telephone (rolling)	4.0
Nanos Research	October 4, 2019		36.2	32.6	15.6	5.8	7.4	1.8	±2.8 pp	1,200 (1/3)	telephone (rolling)	3.6
Mainstreet Research	October 3, 2019		34.3	34.8	11.4	5.8	9.1	3.2	±2.07 pp	2,207 (1/3)	IVR (rolling)	0.5
Nanos Research	October 3, 2019		36.3	34.3	13.8	5.9	8.2	1.2	±2.8 pp	1,200 (1/3)	telephone (rolling)	2.0
Campaign Research	October 2, 2019		32	34	14	5	11	3	±1.4 pp	4,755	online	2
Mainstreet Research	October 2, 2019		33.4	36.4	11.9	5.7	9.0	2.5	±2.07 pp	2,234 (1/3)	IVR (rolling)	3.0
Nanos Research	October 2, 2019		32.9	35.2	14.9	5.5	9.9	1.4	±2.8 pp	1,200 (1/3)	telephone (rolling)	2.3
Forum Research	October 1, 2019		34	31	12	6	12	4	±3 pp	1,853	IVR	3
Mainstreet Research	October 1, 2019		33.5	36.0	11.6	5.3	10.0	2.8	±2.06 pp	2,259 (1/3)	IVR (rolling)	2.5
Nanos Research	October 1, 2019		34.2	33.9	15.2	4.5	10.2	1.8	±2.8 pp	1,200 (1/3)	telephone (rolling)	0.3
Mainstreet Research	September 30, 2019		33.3	36.1	11.6	5.3	10.0	2.9	±2.1 pp	2,183 (1/3)	IVR (rolling)	2.8
Nanos Research	September 30, 2019		32.2	34.5	14.3	4.4	11.1	3.0	±2.8 pp	1,200 (1/3)	telephone (rolling)	2.3
Leger	September 30, 2019		34	34	14	5	11	2	±2.48 pp	1,558	online	0
Angus Reid	September 30, 2019		30	37	14	7	8	3	±3 pp	1,522	online	7
Ipsos	September 30, 2019		34	37	15	5	7	2	±2.9 pp	1,489	online	3
Mainstreet Research	September 29, 2019		34.4	34.1	10.9	5.6	10.5	3.4	±2.12 pp	2,140 (1/3)	IVR (rolling)	0.3
Nanos Research	September 29, 2019		32.7	34.0	13.2	4.1	12.6	2.5	±2.8 pp	1,200 (1/3)	telephone (rolling)	1.3
EKOS	September 29, 2019		33.4	31.1	11.4	3.0	13.4	5.1	±2.5 pp	1,492	telephone/IVR	2.3
Mainstreet Research	September 28, 2019		34.0	33.7	11.7	5.8	10.1	3.7	±2.06 pp	2,270 (2/3)	IVR (rolling)	0.3
Nanos Research	September 28, 2019		32.5	34.2	13.0	4.6	12.6	2.1	±2.8 pp	1,200 (1/3)	telephone (rolling)	1.7
Nanos Research	September 27, 2019		32.6	34.1	14.4	3.8	13.2	1.3	±2.8 pp	1,200 (1/3)	telephone (rolling)	1.5
Research Co.	September 26, 2019		36	33	15	5	9	2	±3.1 pp	1,000	online	3
Mainstreet Research	September 26, 2019		33.4	35.6	10.7	5.6	9.7	3.7	±1.98 pp	2,436 (1/3)	IVR (rolling)	2.2
Nanos Research	September 26, 2019		34.4	33.7	15.0	4.4	10.5	1.8	±2.8 pp	1,200 (1/3)	telephone (rolling)	0.7
Abacus Data	September 26, 2019		35	33	15	5	10	2	±2.3 pp	1,975	online	2
Mainstreet Research	September 25, 2019		34.4	35.8	10.7	5.5	9.2	3.4	±2.1 pp	2,425 (1/3)	IVR (rolling)	1.4
Nanos Research	September 25, 2019		35.5	33.6	14.5	4.7	9.5	2.0	±2.8 pp	1,200 (1/3)	telephone (rolling)	1.9
Innovative Research	September 25, 2019		35	31	14	5	10	5	N/A	2,302	online	4
Mainstreet Research	September 24, 2019		35.2	35.5	10.8	5.2	9.3	2.9	±2.1 pp	2,389 (1/3)	IVR (rolling)	0.3
Nanos Research	September 24, 2019		35.3	35.4	12.7	5.5	8.8	2.1	±2.8 pp	1,200 (1/3)	telephone (rolling)	0.1
Leger	September 24, 2019		34	33	13	5	11	4	±2.11 pp	2,153	online	1
Innovative Research	September 24, 2019		35	34	12	5	10	4	N/A	2,496	online	1
Mainstreet Research	September 23, 2019		34.4	35.9	11.2	4.8	9.6		±2.03 pp	2,333 (1/3)	IVR (rolling)	1.5
Nanos Research	September 23, 2019		35.1	33.5	12.9	5.7	10.1	2.4	±2.8 pp	1,200 (1/3)	telephone (rolling)	1.6
Angus Reid	September 23, 2019		30	35	15	6	11	3	±2.5 pp	1,523	online	5
Ipsos	September 23, 2019		32	36	15	4	11	2	±2.9 pp	1,500	online	4
Mainstreet Research	September 22, 2019		33.7	35.8					±2.1 pp	2,168 (1/3)	IVR (rolling)	2.1
Nanos Research	September 22, 2019		33.1	34.3	12.8	5.8	10.6	2.9	±2.8 pp	1,200 (1/3)	telephone (rolling)	1.2
EKOS	September 22, 2019		32.0	35.3	10.9	4.9	10.3	4.1	±2.8 pp	1,272	IVR	3.3
Abacus Data	September 22, 2019		32	34	15	4	10	3	±2.3 pp	1,929	online	2
Mainstreet Research	September 21, 2019		33.9	34.8	11.4	4.9	10.7	3.6	±2.13 pp	2,124 (1/3)	IVR (rolling)	0.9
Forum Research	September 21, 2019		33	33	11	6	11	5	±3 pp	2,449	IVR	0
Nanos Research	September 21, 2019		32.9	35.5	14.0	5.3	9.5	2.2	±2.8 pp	1,200 (1/3)	telephone (rolling)	2.6
DART/Maru	September 20, 2019		30	37	15	6	8	3	±2.9 pp	1,520	online	7
Mainstreet Research	September 20, 2019		35.9	34.2	10.9	4.8	10.4	3.1	±2.14 pp	2,087 (1/3)	IVR (rolling)	1.7
Nanos Research	September 20, 2019		32.0	36.8	13.7	5.4	9.0	2.4	±2.8 pp	1,200 (1/3)	telephone (rolling)	4.8
Mainstreet Research	September 19, 2019		36.8	34.2	10.1	4.7	9.8	3.7	±2.14 pp	2,087 (1/3)	IVR (rolling)	2.6
Nanos Research	September 19, 2019		34.2	37.4	12.8	3.5	9.3	2.4	±2.8 pp	1,200 (1/3)	telephone (rolling)	3.2
Mainstreet Research	September 18, 2019		37.2	34.4	9.8	4.4	10.1	3.3	±2.21 pp	1,935 (2/3)	IVR (rolling)	2.8
Nanos Research	September 18, 2019		35.0	37.8	11.8	4.0	7.7	2.8	±2.8 pp	1,200 (1/3)	telephone (rolling)	2.8
Nanos Research	September 17, 2019		35.5	37.2	13.6	4.0	7.0	1.7	±2.8 pp	1,200 (1/3)	telephone (rolling)	1.7
Leger	September 17, 2019		34	33	12	5	11	4	±2.45 pp	1,598	online	1
Mainstreet Research	September 16, 2019		36.8	34.8	9.7	4.5	9.4	3.8	±2.23 pp	1,935 (1/3)	IVR (rolling)	2.0
Nanos Research	September 16, 2019		34.9	35.9	15.4	4.7	6.5	1.8	±2.8 pp	1,200 (1/3)	telephone (rolling)	1.0
Angus Reid	September 16, 2019		33	36	13	5	9	4	±2.0 pp	2,154	online	3
Mainstreet Research	September 15, 2019		36.5	35.0	9.6	4.3	9.9	3.5	±2.23 pp	1,935	IVR (rolling)	1.5
Nanos Research	September 15, 2019		34.0	34.4	16.4	4.4	7.8	2.3	±2.8 pp	1,200 (1/3)	telephone (rolling)	0.4
Innovative Research	September 15, 2019		35	32	14	4	11	4	N/A	1,622	online	3
Nanos Research	September 14, 2019		35.2	32.3	16.6	3.8	9.6	2.0	±2.8 pp	1,200 (1/3)	telephone (rolling)	2.9
Ipsos	September 13, 2019		35	35	14	4	9	2	±2.2 pp	2,562	online/telephone	0
Nanos Research	September 13, 2019		35.4	32.8	15.7	3.6	9.5	2.4	±2.8 pp	1,200	telephone (rolling)	2.6
DART/Maru	September 11, 2019		32	35	15	6	8	2	±2.9 pp	1,517	online	3
Forum Research	September 11, 2019		32.4	36.3	8.6	4.1	11.6	4.9	±3 pp	1,001	IVR	3.9

=== Pre-campaign period ===
Evolution of voting intentions according to polls conducted during the pre-campaign period of the 2019 Canadian federal election, graphed from the data in the table below. Trendlines are local regressions, with polls weighted by proximity in time and a logarithmic function of sample size. 95% confidence ribbons represent uncertainty about the trendlines, not the likelihood that actual election results would fall within the intervals.

Polling firm	Last date of polling^{[1]}	Link	LPC	CPC	NDP	BQ	GPC	PPC^{[5]}	Margin of error^{[2]}	Sample size^{[3]}	Polling method^{[4]}	Lead
	September 11, 2019	2019 Canadian Federal Election was called										
Abacus Data	September 10, 2019		33	35	15	4	10	3	±2.2 pp	2,000	online	2
Leger	September 9, 2019		34	35	11	5	11	3	±2.49 pp	1,546	online	1
Mainstreet Research	September 8, 2019		37.5	34.0	8.4	3.6	10.8	4.6	±2.26 pp	1,876	IVR	3.5
Nanos Research	September 6, 2019		34.6	30.7	16.5	4.0	11.0	2.0	±3.1 pp	1,000 (1/4)	telephone (rolling)	3.9
Campaign Research	September 5, 2019		34	34	12	4	12	2	±2.14 pp	2,094	online	0
Innovative Research	September 5, 2019		33	34	13	5	11	5	N/A	3,236	online	1
Nanos Research	August 30, 2019		35.4	31.3	15.7	4.4	10.3	1.6	±3.1 pp	1,000 (1/4)	telephone (rolling)	4.1
EKOS	August 29, 2019		37.2	32.9	7.2	5.5	10.4	4.3	±3.3 pp	902	IVR	4.3
Leger	August 29, 2019		34	33	12	5	12	3	±2.14 pp	2,102	online	1
Abacus Data	August 29, 2019		33	34	17	4	9	3	±1.5 pp	4,549	online	1
Angus Reid	August 26, 2019		32	36	14	4	9	4	±2.5 pp	1,534	online	4
Nanos Research	August 23, 2019		33.66	33.65	14.87	4.17	9.41	2.09	±3.1 pp	1,000 (1/4)	telephone (rolling)	0.01
EKOS	August 22, 2019		33.1	34.1	10.4	5.1	11.2	3.7	±2.9 pp	1,182	IVR	1.0
Leger	August 19, 2019		33	33	11	4	13	4	±2.5 pp	1,535	online	0
Ipsos	August 19, 2019		33	35	18	3	9	1	±3.5 pp	1,001	online	2
Abacus Data	August 19, 2019		32	32	17	4	10	3	±2.2 pp	2,152	online	0
DART/Maru	August 17, 2019		32	39	15	5	7	1	±2.9 pp	1,512	online	7
Nanos Research	August 16, 2019		34.61	31.41	14.58	4.16	10.00	1.68	±3.1 pp	1,000 (1/4)	telephone (rolling)	3.20
Campaign Research	August 13, 2019		32	33	13	4	12	3	±2 pp	2,365	online	1
Nanos Research	August 9, 2019		35.00	32.46	14.75	3.69	9.80	1.33	±3.1 pp	1,000 (1/4)	telephone (rolling)	2.54
Abacus Data	August 6, 2019		32	33	17	4	10	3	±2.7 pp	1,422	online	1
Nanos Research	August 2, 2019		36.7	30.8	16.1	3.7	9.3	1.4	±3.1 pp	1,000 (1/2)	telephone (rolling)	5.9
Mainstreet Research	July 31, 2019		34.5	34.1	11.1	4.4	11.1	3.3	±1.97 pp	2,463	IVR	0.4
Innovative Research	July 31, 2019		36	32	14	4	10	4	N/A	1,804	online	4
Forum Research	July 28, 2019		31	34	12	5	12	5	±3 pp	1,733	IVR	3
EKOS	July 25, 2019		30.6	36.0	9.9	4.6	12.9	3.8	±2.9 pp	1,115	IVR	5.4
Leger	July 23, 2019		33	36	11	4	12	3	±2.5 pp	1,536	online	3
EKOS	July 18, 2019		33.6	31.3	12.5	3.1	12.5	4.8	±2.9 pp	1,186	IVR	2.3
Nanos Research	July 19, 2019		35.6	30.0	18.6	4.0	9.0	1.4	±3.1 pp	1,000 (1/4)	telephone (rolling)	5.6
Research Co.	July 17, 2019		34	31	17	4	10	3	±3.1 pp	1,000	online	3
Abacus Data	July 17, 2019		32	32	16	4	11	3	±2.6 pp	1,500	online	0
Ipsos	July 15, 2019		31	37	18	5	7	1	±3.5 pp	1,000	online	6
Campaign Research	July 12, 2019		33	32	14	4	14	3	±2.3 pp	1,896	online	1
Angus Reid	July 12, 2019		30	38	14	4	10	2	±2.0 pp	2,361	online	8
Nanos Research	July 12, 2019		35.9	29.7	18.5	4.8	8.3	1.5	±3.1 pp	1,000 (1/4)	telephone (rolling)	6.2
EKOS	July 8, 2019		30.7	32.3	10.8	5.0	14.9	4.2	±3.2 pp	948	IVR	1.6
Innovative Research	July 8, 2019		35	32	12	4	11	5	N/A	2,515	online	3
Nanos Research	July 5, 2019		34.6	30.4	17.9	4.9	8.8	1.6	±3.1 pp	1,000 (1/4)	telephone (rolling)	4.2
Abacus Data	July 2, 2019		32	33	16	4	11	3	±1.8 pp	3,092	online	1
Mainstreet Research	July 2, 2019		35.0	33.2	10.4	4.5	10.3	4.6	±1.9 pp	2,651	IVR	1.8
EKOS	June 29, 2019		31.6	34.1	9.7	3.8	12.6	5.7	N/A	1,194	IVR	2.5
Nanos Research	June 28, 2019		34.5	31.7	16.5	4.6	9.8	0.9	±3.1 pp	1,000 (1/4)	telephone (rolling)	2.8
DART/Maru	June 26, 2019		33	37	17	5	7	1	±2.9 pp	1,512	online	4
Forum Research	June 23, 2019		29	35	13	5	12	4	±3 pp	1,539	IVR	6
Nanos Research	June 21, 2019		32.5	32.8	16.9	4.9	10.2	0.7	±3.1 pp	1,000 (1/4)	telephone (rolling)	0.3
EKOS	June 17, 2019		30.1	34.2	12.0	4.3	13.2	3.6	±2.0 pp	2,491	IVR	4.1
Nanos Research	June 14, 2019		30.3	34.0	16.8	4.6	11.4	0.7	±3.1 pp	1,000 (1/4)	telephone (rolling)	3.7
Leger	June 10, 2019		29	38	13	4	11	3	±2.5 pp	1,528	online	9
Ipsos	June 7, 2019		31	37	18	5	6		±3.5 pp	1,003	online	6
Nanos Research	June 7, 2019		30.9	34.2	16.9	4.0	11.3	0.8	±3.1 pp	1,000 (1/4)	telephone (rolling)	3.3
Campaign Research	June 6, 2019		32	35	14	4	12	2	±1.9 pp	2,735	online	3
Angus Reid	June 4, 2019		26	37	15	5	12	4	±2 pp	4,698	online	11
Forum Research	June 2, 2019		30	34	13	6	13	4	±3 pp	1,633	IVR	4
Nanos Research	May 31, 2019		29.5	34.3	16.4	4.4	11.5	0.8	±3.1 pp	1,000 (1/4)	telephone (rolling)	4.8
Innovative Research	May 30, 2019		33	33	12	5	13		N/A	1,691	online	0
Abacus Data	May 30, 2019		33	32	16	3	12	3	±2.6 pp	1,500	online	1
Nanos Research	May 24, 2019		29.2	34.8	15.6	4.7	11.5	1.6	±3.1 pp	1,000 (1/4)	telephone (rolling)	5.6
Nanos Research	May 17, 2019		30.6	35.9	14.2	4.0	11.1	1.1	±3.1 pp	1,000 (1/4)	telephone (rolling)	5.3
Nanos Research	May 10, 2019		29.7	35.4	15.0	4.4	11.3	0.9	±3.1 pp	1,000 (1/4)	telephone (rolling)	5.7
Nanos Research	May 3, 2019		31.8	34.5	15.9	4.6	9.7	0.9	±3.1 pp	1,000 (1/4)	telephone (rolling)	2.7
Campaign Research	May 1, 2019		31	35	17	3	10	2	±2.6 pp	1,471	online	4
Angus Reid	April 30, 2019		25	38	18	5	11	3	±2.5 pp	1,525	online	13
Abacus Data	April 30, 2019		31	34	17	4	9	3	±1.5 pp	4,015	online	3
Nanos Research	April 26, 2019		32.0	34.9	16.5	4.1	9.0	0.5	±3.1 pp	1,000 (1/4)	telephone (rolling)	2.9
Ipsos	April 25, 2019		32	36	19	5			±3.5 pp	1,000	online	4
Forum Research	April 24, 2019		30	37	14	6	9	2	±3 pp	1,595	IVR	7
Leger	April 22, 2019		27	40	12	5	11	3	±2.5 pp	1,522	online	13
Nanos Research	April 18, 2019		33.0	35.5	15.2	4.7	8.4	0.8	±3.1 pp	1,000 (1/4)	telephone (rolling)	2.5
Nanos Research	April 12, 2019		34.1	35.0	14.9	4.5	8.8	0.7	±3.1 pp	1,000 (1/4)	telephone (rolling)	0.9
Innovative Research	April 10, 2019		36	32	13	4	10		N/A	2,527	online	4
Forum Research	April 6, 2019		29	42	12	6	9	2	±3 pp	1,634	IVR	13
Campaign Research	April 6, 2019		32	34	15	5	10	3	±2.2 pp	2,035	online	2
Nanos Research	April 5, 2019		32.8	34.9	16.6	4.0	9.5	0.5	±3.1 pp	1,000 (1/4)	telephone (rolling)	2.1
Nanos Research	March 29, 2019		34.6	35.1	16.6	4.4	8.1	0.5	±3.1 pp	1,000 (1/4)	telephone (rolling)	0.5
Ipsos	March 27, 2019		30	40	21	5			±3.5 pp	1,002	online	10
Mainstreet Research	March 25, 2019		35.0	37.4	11.6	3.1	7.9	3.8	±1.06 pp	8,501	IVR	2.4
Angus Reid	March 25, 2019		28	37	17	5	8	4	±2 pp	5,807	online	9
Nanos Research	March 22, 2019		32.5	34.6	19.4	3.9	8.3	0.6	±3.1 pp	1,000 (1/4)	telephone (rolling)	2.1
Forum Research	March 20, 2019		35	41	14	1	6	2	±3 pp	1,490	IVR	6
Leger	March 20, 2019		31	37	14	4	10	3	±2.51 pp	1,513	online	6
Nanos Research	March 15, 2019		32.6	35.5	19.9	3.2	7.7	0.5	±3.1 pp	1,000 (1/4)	telephone (rolling)	2.9
Abacus Data	March 10, 2019		32	34	16	4	11		±3.3 pp	900 (1/3)	online (rolling)	2
Campaign Research	March 10, 2019		30	36	16	4	10	2	±2.5 pp	1,893	online	6
Abacus Data	March 9, 2019		31	35	16	4	11		±3.3 pp	900 (1/3)	online (rolling)	4
Abacus Data	March 8, 2019		31	36	15	5	10		±3.3 pp	900 (1/3)	online (rolling)	5
Nanos Research	March 8, 2019		32.9	36.1	17.9	3.6	8.3	0.5	±3.1 pp	1,000 (1/4)	telephone (rolling)	3.2
Abacus Data	March 7, 2019		33	34	16	4	10		±3.3 pp	900 (1/3)	online (rolling)	1
Abacus Data	March 6, 2019		32	34	18	4	9		±3.3 pp	900 (1/3)	online (rolling)	2
Abacus Data	March 5, 2019		31	35	17	4	9		±3.3 pp	900 (1/3)	online (rolling)	4
Innovative Research	March 4, 2019		36	32	13	5	9	5	N/A	2,122	online	4
Ipsos	March 4, 2019		31	40	20	4	4	0	±3.5 pp	1,000	online	9
Abacus Data	March 4, 2019		30	36	17	5	9		±2.6 pp	1,500	online	6
Nanos Research	March 1, 2019		34.2	34.7	15.5	3.6	9.1	0.7	±3.1 pp	1,000 (1/4)	telephone (rolling)	0.5
Forum Research	February 28, 2019		33	42	12	3	5	4	±3 pp	1,301	IVR	9
Abacus Data	February 26, 2019		32	33	17	4	9		±2.1 pp	2,374	online	1
Angus Reid	February 24, 2019		31	38	14	5	8		±3.1 pp	1,009	online	7
Nanos Research	February 22, 2019		35.7	33.6	15.0	3.7	8.4	1.2	±3.1 pp	1,000 (1/4)	telephone (rolling)	2.1
Leger	February 19, 2019		34	36	12	5	8	4	±2.51 pp	1,529	online	2
Ipsos	February 18, 2019		34	36	17	6			±3.5 pp	1,002	online	2
Nanos Research	February 15, 2019		37.9	31.8	13.7	4.1	7.8	1.5	±3.1 pp	1,000 (1/4)	telephone (rolling)	6.1
Abacus Data	February 11, 2019		33	35	15	4	9		±2.0 pp	2,500	online	2
Campaign Research	February 11, 2019		32	37	14	5	7	3	±2.5 pp	1,590	online	5
Nanos Research	February 8, 2019		37.5	34.4	13.0	3.8	7.4	1.7	±3.1 pp	1,000 (1/4)	telephone (rolling)	3.1
Abacus Data	February 5, 2019		34	34	17	4	8		±2.0 pp	2,500	online	0
Nanos Research	February 1, 2019		37.6	35.9	13.2	3.1	7.9	1.7	±3.1 pp	1,000 (1/4)	telephone (rolling)	1.7
Nanos Research	January 25, 2019		37.6	36.6	12.8	3.0	8.1	1.2	±3.1 pp	1,000 (1/4)	telephone (rolling)	1.0
Innovative Research	January 24, 2019		38	32	12	5	8	4	N/A	2,451	online	6
Mainstreet Research	January 18, 2019		37.2	35.1	11.5	3.2	7.2	4.2	±1.1 pp	7,941	IVR	2.1
Nanos Research	January 18, 2019		37.2	36.1	14.2	3.2	7.4	1.5	±3.1 pp	1,000 (1/4)	telephone (rolling)	1.1
Yves-François Blanchet is acclaimed leader of the Bloc Québécois (January 17, 2019)
Nanos Research	January 11, 2019		38.1	33.9	15.4	3.3	6.9	1.6	±3.1 pp	1,000 (1/4)	telephone (rolling)	4.2
Innovative Research	January 7, 2019		36	33	15	5	8	4	N/A	2,700	online	3
Nanos Research	January 4, 2019		38.7	33.3	16.7	3.0	6.0	1.4	±3.1 pp	1,000 (1/4)	telephone (rolling)	5.4
Nanos Research	December 28, 2018		36.8	34.4	16.1	3.4	6.4	1.2	±3.1 pp	1,000 (1/4)	telephone (rolling)	2.4
Nanos Research	December 21, 2018		35.2	34.1	16.0	3.8	7.0	1.5	±3.1 pp	1,000 (1/4)	telephone (rolling)	1.1
Abacus Data	December 18, 2018		35	34	17	4	7		±2.5 pp	2,000	online	1
Nanos Research	December 14, 2018		36.0	33.9	16.6	3.4	6.6	0.7	±3.1 pp	1,000 (1/4)	telephone (rolling)	2.1
Campaign Research	December 13, 2018		33	35	16	4	8	2	±2.5 pp	1,494	online	2
Ipsos	December 12, 2018		38	33	18	4			±2.5 pp	2,001	online	5
Nanos Research	December 7, 2018		34.1	34.8	15.8	3.1	8.2	0.8	±3.1 pp	1,000 (1/4)	telephone (rolling)	0.7
Nanos Research	November 30, 2018		37.9	32.2	14.3	3.0	7.6	0.8	±3.1 pp	1,000 (1/4)	telephone (rolling)	5.7
Forum Research	November 29, 2018		34	43	11	4	6		±3 pp	1,541	IVR	9
Nanos Research	November 23, 2018		39.6	31.5	14.5	2.4	6.9	1.1	±3.1 pp	1,000 (1/4)	telephone (rolling)	8.1
Leger	November 20, 2018		39	33	14	4	5	4	±2.51 pp	1,521	online	6
Nanos Research	November 16, 2018		39.4	28.7	17.2	2.5	7.3	1.1	±3.1 pp	1,000 (1/4)	telephone (rolling)	10.7
Innovative Research	November 15, 2018		38	32	14	4	8	3	N/A	2,490	online	6
Abacus Data	November 13, 2018		38	31	16	4	9		±2.6 pp	1,500	online	7
Campaign Research	November 9, 2018		35	35	17	4	7		±2.5 pp	2,512	online	0
Nanos Research	November 9, 2018		39.4	27.5	19.8	2.0	6.1	1.4	±3.1 pp	1,000 (1/4)	telephone (rolling)	11.9
Mainstreet Research	November 7, 2018		39.3	34.6	10.8	3.4	6.8	3.8	±1.09 pp	7,961	IVR	4.7
Nanos Research	November 2, 2018		39.6	28.1	19.3	1.9	6.9	1.2	±3.1 pp	1,000 (1/4)	telephone (rolling)	11.5
Nanos Research	October 26, 2018		39.4	28.2	19.3	2.8	6.5	1.0	±3.1 pp	1,000 (1/4)	telephone (rolling)	11.2
Nanos Research	October 19, 2018		39.5	29.4	16.9	3.6	7.0	1.4	±3.1 pp	1,000 (1/4)	telephone (rolling)	10.1
Nanos Research	October 12, 2018		37.1	31.4	16.1	3.7	7.2	1.3	±3.1 pp	1,000 (1/4)	telephone (rolling)	5.7
Forum Research	October 10, 2018		32	41	15	4	7		±3 pp	1,226	IVR	9
Ipsos	October 9, 2018		36	35	20	4			±2.5 pp	2,001	online	1
Nanos Research	October 5, 2018		37.3	31.1	16.2	3.8	6.7		±3.1 pp	1,000 (1/4)	telephone (rolling)	6.2
Innovative Research	October 1, 2018		38	31	15	5	7	3	N/A	2,410	online	7
Nanos Research	September 28, 2018		38.0	31.7	16.7	2.6	6.0		±3.1 pp	1,000 (1/4)	telephone (rolling)	6.3
Nanos Research	September 21, 2018		39.0	31.2	17.0	2.4	5.5		±3.1 pp	1,000 (1/4)	telephone (rolling)	7.8
Pollara	September 20, 2018		40	34	12	3	7	2	±3.1 pp	1,002	online	6
Abacus Data	September 19, 2018		38	34	17	3	7		±2.2 pp	2,000	online	4
DART/Maru	September 19, 2018		30	38	17	5	8		±2.1 pp	5,769	online	8
Maxime Bernier forms the People's Party of Canada following his resignation from the Conservative Party caucus (September 14, 2018)
Campaign Research	September 14, 2018		36	38	15	5	7		±2.5 pp	1,486	online	2
Nanos Research	September 14, 2018		41.1	31.4	14.9	2.0	5.8		±3.1 pp	1,000 (1/4)	telephone (rolling)	9.7
Nanos Research	September 7, 2018		39.9	32.8	14.9	2.5	6.5		±3.1 pp	1,000 (1/4)	telephone (rolling)	7.1
Nanos Research	August 31, 2018		39.9	32.4	15.8	3.4	6.7		±3.1 pp	1,000 (1/4)	telephone (rolling)	7.5
Abacus Data	August 25, 2018		37	34	18	3	6		±3.1 pp	1,000	online	3
Nanos Research	August 24, 2018		38.8	34.4	16.5	2.9	6.3		±3.1 pp	1,000 (1/4)	telephone (rolling)	4.4
Abacus Data	August 20, 2018		37	33	18	3	8		±2.5 pp	1,500	online	4
Nanos Research	August 17, 2018		37.5	33.9	19.0	3.2	5.7		±3.1 pp	1,000 (1/4)	telephone (rolling)	3.6
Forum Research	August 12, 2018		36	42	15	2	4		±3 pp	1,777	IVR	6
Nanos Research	August 10, 2018		35.8	35.1	20.1	3.2	4.8		±3.1 pp	1,000 (1/4)	telephone (rolling)	0.7
Nanos Research	August 3, 2018		36.9	36.6	17.8	2.3	5.2		±3.1 pp	1,000 (1/4)	telephone (rolling)	0.3
Nanos Research	July 27, 2018		35.8	35.2	19.1	2.2	6.6		±3.1 pp	1,000 (1/4)	telephone (rolling)	0.6
EKOS	July 26, 2018		34.9	32.1	17.3	4.0	9.3		±2.7 pp	1,302	IVR	2.8
Abacus Data	July 22, 2018		36	34	19	3	7		±2.2 pp	2,000	online	2
Nanos Research	July 20, 2018		35.8	35.9	19.0	2.0	6.1		±3.1 pp	1,000 (1/4)	telephone (rolling)	0.1
Mainstreet Research	July 17, 2018		39.4	36.9	11.8	2.4	7.0		±1.01 pp	9,384	IVR	2.5
Ipsos	July 16, 2018		39	32	21	2			±3.5 pp	1,000	online	7
Nanos Research	July 13, 2018		37.3	34.5	18.4	1.8	7.1		±3.1 pp	1,000 (1/4)	telephone (rolling)	2.8
Nanos Research	July 6, 2018		35.7	33.4	20.3	2.4	6.8		±3.1 pp	1,000 (1/4)	telephone (rolling)	2.3
Ipsos	June 29, 2018		33	37	21	3			±3.5 pp	1,002	online	4
Nanos Research	June 29, 2018		36.5	33.1	20.8	2.7	5.4		±3.1 pp	1,000 (1/4)	telephone (rolling)	3.4
Nanos Research	June 22, 2018		36.7	32.0	20.6	3.6	5.7		±3.1 pp	1,000 (1/4)	telephone (rolling)	4.7
Campaign Research	June 18, 2018		34	36	18	3	8		±2.5 pp	1,579	online	2
Ipsos	June 15, 2018		32	36	20	5			±3.5 pp	1,001	online	4
Nanos Research	June 15, 2018		36.9	32.5	19.9	4.1	5.1		±3.1 pp	1,000 (1/4)	telephone (rolling)	4.4
Angus Reid	June 14, 2018		36	32	16	4	9		±3.1 pp	1,023	online	4
Mario Beaulieu is named interim leader of the Bloc Québécois (June 13, 2018)
Nanos Research	June 8, 2018		35.3	33.0	22.0	4.1	4.8		±3.1 pp	1,000 (1/4)	telephone (rolling)	2.3
Nanos Research	June 1, 2018		34.1	34.0	21.2	4.4	5.4		±3.1 pp	1,000 (1/4)	telephone (rolling)	0.1
Forum Research	May 31, 2018		31	44	17	2	5		±3 pp	969	IVR	13
Nanos Research	May 25, 2018		33.0	36.0	19.8	4.0	6.4		±3.1 pp	1,000 (1/4)	telephone (rolling)	3.0
Nanos Research	May 18, 2018		35.1	34.0	20.1	3.6	5.9		±3.1 pp	1,000 (1/4)	telephone (rolling)	1.1
Forum Research	May 16, 2018		30	46	18	2	4		±3 pp	1,484	IVR	16
Innovative Research	May 14, 2018		35	38	15	4	7		N/A	2,327	online	3
Nanos Research	May 11, 2018		36.1	34.4	18.5	3.7	6.0		±3.1 pp	1,000 (1/4)	telephone (rolling)	1.7
Leger	May 10, 2018		39	36	15	2			±2.1 pp	2,103	online	3
Nanos Research	May 4, 2018		38.0	33.2	17.6	4.2	5.4		±3.1 pp	1,000 (1/4)	telephone (rolling)	4.8
Innovative Research	May 2, 2018		35	38	16	4	6		±3.1 pp	1,000	telephone	3
Ipsos	April 30, 2018		36	35	20	3			±2.6 pp	1,907	online	1
Nanos Research	April 27, 2018		39.2	30.6	18.2	4.4	5.9		±3.1 pp	1,000 (1/4)	telephone (rolling)	8.6
Forum Research	April 20, 2018		30	43	14	4	8		±2 pp	1,585	IVR	13
Nanos Research	April 20, 2018		38.2	31.6	17.9	3.7	7.0		±3.1 pp	1,000 (1/4)	telephone (rolling)	6.6
Mainstreet Research	April 18, 2018		40.4	37.1	11.9	2.6	5.9		±1.01 pp	9,401	IVR	3.3
Nanos Research	April 13, 2018		41.1	29.2	15.8	3.8	8.2		±3.1 pp	1,000 (1/4)	telephone (rolling)	11.9
Nanos Research	April 6, 2018		38.2	32.9	17.2	3.0	7.0		±3.1 pp	1,000 (1/4)	telephone (rolling)	5.3
Nanos Research	March 29, 2018		39.1	33.7	16.4	2.4	6.5		±3.1 pp	1,000 (1/4)	telephone (rolling)	5.4
Ipsos	March 23, 2018		31	38	23	3			±3.5 pp	1,003	online	7
Nanos Research	March 23, 2018		38.1	34.7	16.8	3.1	5.5		±3.1 pp	1,000 (1/4)	telephone (rolling)	3.4
Nanos Research	March 16, 2018		35.9	34.8	18.5	3.5	6.2		±3.1 pp	1,000 (1/4)	telephone (rolling)	1.1
Angus Reid	March 15, 2018		30	40	19	4	6		±2 pp	5,423	online	10
Nanos Research	March 9, 2018		35.8	33.1	19.3	4.5	6.7		±3.1 pp	1,000 (1/4)	telephone (rolling)	2.7
Leger	March 8, 2018		38	38	14	3	5		±2.5 pp	1,536	online	0
Abacus Data	March 4, 2018		36	33	18	3	8		±2.2 pp	4,023	online	3
Nanos Research	March 2, 2018		36.5	32.7	19.0	4.0	7.1		±3.1 pp	1,000 (1/4)	telephone (rolling)	3.8
Ipsos	March 1, 2018		33	38	21	3			±3.5 pp	1,001	online	5
Forum Research	March 1, 2018		34	46	14	2	3		±3 pp	941	IVR	12
Nanos Research	February 23, 2018		37.7	31.5	19.2	3.8	6.9		±3.1 pp	1,000 (1/4)	telephone (rolling)	6.2
Nanos Research	February 16, 2018		36.6	30.8	20.3	3.3	8.0		±3.1 pp	1,000 (1/4)	telephone (rolling)	5.8
Campaign Research	February 10, 2018		39	32	16	4	7		±2.1 pp	2,227	online	7
Nanos Research	February 9, 2018		38.1	30.4	18.5	3.1	8.8		±3.1 pp	1,000 (1/4)	telephone (rolling)	7.7
Nanos Research	February 2, 2018		38.1	30.3	19.7	3.0	7.6		±3.1 pp	1,000 (1/4)	telephone (rolling)	7.8
Abacus Data	January 28, 2018		39	32	18	4	6		±2.7 pp	1,411	online	7
Nanos Research	January 26, 2018		37.8	30.6	19.9	3.5	7.5		±3.1 pp	1,000 (1/4)	telephone (rolling)	7.2
Forum Research	January 24, 2018		38	43	12	3	3		±3 pp	1,408	IVR	5
Nanos Research	January 19, 2018		37.9	34.4	17.3	3.7	6.0		±3.1 pp	1,000 (1/4)	telephone (rolling)	3.5
Nanos Research	January 12, 2018		37.0	33.8	20.0	3.8	4.5		±3.1 pp	1,000 (1/4)	telephone (rolling)	3.2
Campaign Research	January 11, 2018		42	29	16	4	7		±2.3 pp	1,887	online	13
Mainstreet Research	January 6, 2018		40.3	34.5	13.1	4.4	7.7		±0.99 pp	9,830	IVR	5.8
Nanos Research	January 5, 2018		40.9	30.7	19.5	3.7	4.8		±3.1 pp	1,000 (1/4)	telephone (rolling)	10.2
Nanos Research	December 29, 2017		41.6	30.1	20.1	3.5	4.2		±3.1 pp	1,000 (1/4)	telephone (rolling)	11.5
Nanos Research	December 22, 2017		42.8	29.1	20.0	3.3	4.2		±3.1 pp	1,000 (1/4)	telephone (rolling)	13.7
Nanos Research	December 15, 2017		41.9	29.3	19.1	3.4	5.7		±3.1 pp	1,000 (1/4)	telephone (rolling)	12.6
Forum Research	December 14, 2017		38	39	12	5	5		±3 pp	1,284	IVR	1
Ipsos	December 14, 2017		38	31	20	5			±2.4 pp	2,098	online	7
Nanos Research	December 8, 2017		40.7	30.3	17.5	3.8	6.7		±3.1 pp	1,000 (1/4)	telephone (rolling)	10.4
Nanos Research	December 1, 2017		40.1	30.7	16.5	4.2	6.9		±3.1 pp	1,000 (1/4)	telephone (rolling)	9.4
Leger	November 30, 2017		40	34	13	4	8		±2.4 pp	1,609	online	6
Nanos Research	November 24, 2017		38.8	30.6	17.2	4.4	6.9		±3.1 pp	1,000 (1/4)	telephone (rolling)	8.2
Nanos Research	November 17, 2017		39.3	30.7	16.6	5.0	7.0		±3.1 pp	1,000 (1/4)	telephone (rolling)	8.6
Abacus Data	November 14, 2017		40	32	18	4	6		±2.6 pp	1,500	online	8
Nanos Research	November 10, 2017		38.3	30.9	17.5	5.3	6.0		±3.1 pp	1,000 (1/4)	telephone (rolling)	7.4
Campaign Research	November 9, 2017		38	30	19	5	7		±1.9 pp	2,616	online	8
Forum Research	November 6, 2017		36	38	14	6	6		±3 pp	1,281	IVR	2
Nanos Research	November 3, 2017		36.6	29.6	19.0	5.9	6.4		±3.1 pp	1,000 (1/4)	telephone (rolling)	7.0
Nanos Research	October 27, 2017		36.1	29.6	18.5	6.1	6.6		±3.1 pp	1,000 (1/4)	telephone (rolling)	6.5
Insights West	October 26, 2017		35	33	20	4	7		±3.1 pp	1,005	online	2
Ipsos	October 25, 2017		38	30	23	4			±3.5 pp	1,001	online	8
Leger	October 25, 2017		42	30	15	4	7		±2.5 pp	1,534	online	12
Abacus Data	October 23, 2017		39	35	15	5	5		±2.6 pp	1,500	online	4
Nanos Research	October 20, 2017		35.0	30.8	17.7	6.3	6.9		±3.1 pp	1,000 (1/4)	telephone (rolling)	4.2
Environics	October 16, 2017		38	30	20	5	7			2,000	online	8
Nanos Research	October 13, 2017		34.6	31.3	16.3	7.2	7.3		±3.1 pp	1,000 (1/4)	telephone (rolling)	3.3
Angus Reid	October 12, 2017		35	35	18	4	6		±2.5 pp	1,492	online	0
Campaign Research	October 11, 2017		38	30	19	4	8		±2.2 pp	2,002	online	8
Nanos Research	October 6, 2017		36.9	32.0	15.4	6.6	5.6		±3.1 pp	1,000 (1/4)	telephone (rolling)	4.9
Angus Reid	October 4, 2017		37	36	14	4	8		±2.5 pp	1,477	online	1
Jagmeet Singh is elected leader of the New Democratic Party (October 1, 2017)
EKOS	October 1, 2017		34.4	33.3	14.5	4.5	8.9		±1.4 pp	4,839	IVR	1.1
Nanos Research	September 29, 2017		38.1	31.2	15.2	6.3	6.7		±3.1 pp	1,000 (1/4)	telephone (rolling)	6.9
Ipsos	September 27, 2017		39	32	20	5			±3.5 pp	1,001	online	7
Nanos Research	September 22, 2017		38.5	32.5	14.6	6.1	5.7		±3.1 pp	1,000 (1/4)	telephone (rolling)	6.0
Nanos Research	September 15, 2017		40.9	30.0	15.5	6.0	5.5		±3.1 pp	1,000 (1/4)	telephone (rolling)	10.9
Forum Research	September 14, 2017		35	39	15	5	4		±3 pp	1,350	IVR	4
Campaign Research	September 11, 2017		42	30	16	5	6		±2.3 pp	1,770	online	12
Nanos Research	September 8, 2017		42.0	30.1	15.9	4.6	5.9		±3.1 pp	1,000 (1/4)	telephone (rolling)	11.9
Abacus Data	September 3, 2017		43	31	17	3	6		±2.6 pp	1,512	online	12
Nanos Research	September 1, 2017		41.2	32.0	15.7	4.9	4.7		±3.1 pp	1,000 (1/4)	telephone (rolling)	9.2
Mainstreet Research	August 31, 2017		43	32	15	4	5		±2.19 pp	2,000	telephone	11
Nanos Research	August 25, 2017		41.9	30.8	16.4	4.3	5.0		±3.1 pp	1,000 (1/4)	telephone (rolling)	11.1
Nanos Research	August 18, 2017		39.4	31.0	18.2	5.1	4.9		±3.1 pp	1,000 (1/4)	telephone (rolling)	8.4
Forum Research	August 17, 2017		42	35	14	4	4		±3 pp	1,150	IVR	7
Nanos Research	August 11, 2017		37.8	31.1	19.2	5.2	5.4		±3.1 pp	1,000 (1/4)	telephone (rolling)	6.7
Nanos Research	August 4, 2017		37.5	29.3	20.2	6.4	5.4		±3.1 pp	1,000 (1/4)	telephone (rolling)	8.2
Nanos Research	July 28, 2017		36.7	29.1	20.0	5.8	6.8		±3.1 pp	1,000 (1/4)	telephone (rolling)	7.6
Nanos Research	July 21, 2017		39.0	30.3	18.4	4.2	6.2		±3.1 pp	1,000 (1/4)	telephone (rolling)	8.7
Abacus Data	July 18, 2017		43	31	16	3	5		±2.2 pp	2,036	online	12
Nanos Research	July 14, 2017		38.3	31.2	16.2	5.9	6.1		±3.1 pp	1,000 (1/4)	telephone (rolling)	7.1
Campaign Research	July 10, 2017		40	31	19	4	5		±2 pp	1,540	online	9
Nanos Research	July 7, 2017		39.8	33.0	13.6	5.3	6.4		±3.1 pp	1,000 (1/4)	telephone (rolling)	6.8
Nanos Research	June 30, 2017		38.9	31.6	14.0	6.3	7.6		±3.1 pp	1,000 (1/4)	telephone (rolling)	7.3
Nanos Research	June 23, 2017		38.3	31.1	15.7	6.8	6.2		±3.1 pp	1,000 (1/4)	telephone (rolling)	7.2
EKOS	June 19, 2017		35.3	33.0	15.2	3.7	8.5		±1.3 pp	5,658	IVR	2.3
Nanos Research	June 16, 2017		37.5	30.9	16.5	6.7	6.5		±3.1 pp	1,000 (1/4)	telephone (rolling)	6.6
Campaign Research	June 12, 2017		39	30	19	5	7		±2 pp	2,767	online	9
Angus Reid	June 12, 2017		37	34	17	4	6		±2 pp	5,406	online	3
Nanos Research	June 9, 2017		36.8	30.5	17.3	6.1	7.1		±3.1 pp	1,000 (1/4)	telephone (rolling)	6.3
Forum Research	June 8, 2017		42	34	12	5	6		±3 pp	1,483	IVR	8
Nanos Research	June 2, 2017		40.0	28.1	16.5	6.2	7.3		±3.1 pp	1,000 (1/4)	telephone (rolling)	11.9
Angus Reid	May 31, 2017		40	33	16	4	6		±2.2 pp	1,958	online	7
Mainstreet Research	May 29, 2017		41	33	17	4	5		±1.85 pp	2,800	IVR	8
Andrew Scheer is elected leader of the Conservative Party of Canada (May 27, 2017)
Nanos Research	May 26, 2017		40.3	28.6	16.7	5.7	7.2		±3.1 pp	1,000 (1/4)	telephone (rolling)	11.7
Nanos Research	May 19, 2017		42.1	27.9	16.2	5.2	7.4		±3.1 pp	1,000 (1/4)	telephone (rolling)	14.2
Leger	May 18, 2017		46	25	16	5	6		±2.5 pp	1,529	online	21
Mainstreet Research	May 15, 2017		41	31	18	5	5		±1.85 pp	2,800	IVR	10
Campaign Research	May 13, 2017		43	27	19	3	7		±2 pp	1,969	online	16
Abacus Data	May 12, 2017		43	27	20	4	5		±2.9 pp	1,182	online	16
Nanos Research	May 12, 2017		42.8	28.1	15.9	6.0	5.6		±3.1 pp	1,000 (1/4)	telephone (rolling)	14.7
Nanos Research	May 5, 2017		41.8	29.0	18.8	5.1	4.1		±3.1 pp	1,000 (1/4)	telephone (rolling)	12.8
Nanos Research	April 28, 2017		43.0	29.6	18.5	4.4	3.6		±3.1 pp	1,000 (1/4)	telephone (rolling)	13.4
Forum Research	April 24, 2017		35	35	17	5	7		±3 pp	1,479	IVR	0
Nanos Research	April 21, 2017		42.0	30.4	19.0	4.0	2.9		±3.1 pp	1,000 (1/4)	telephone (rolling)	11.6
Nanos Research	April 14, 2017		41.4	32.4	18.7	3.4	3.1		±3.1 pp	1,000 (1/4)	telephone (rolling)	9.0
Campaign Research	April 11, 2017		38	29	19	6	6		±2 pp	1,970	online	9
Nanos Research	April 7, 2017		40.3	32.6	18.0	4.0	3.5		±3.1 pp	1,000 (1/4)	telephone (rolling)	7.7
Nanos Research	March 31, 2017		40.6	29.6	18.4	5.2	4.6		±3.1 pp	1,000 (1/4)	telephone (rolling)	11.0
Ipsos	March 30, 2017		39	32	20	5			±3.5 pp	1,001	online	7
Nanos Research	March 24, 2017		42.5	29.2	16.1	4.8	5.2		±3.1 pp	1,000 (1/4)	telephone (rolling)	13.3
Forum Research	March 23, 2017		36	38	15	6	4		±3 pp	1,029	IVR	2
Martine Ouellet is acclaimed leader of the Bloc Québécois (March 18, 2017)
Stratcom	March 17, 2017		44	29	16	4	6		±2.2 pp	2,029	online	15
Nanos Research	March 17, 2017		41.9	28.5	17.1	4.7	5.2		±3.1 pp	1,000 (1/4)	telephone (rolling)	13.4
Nanos Research	March 10, 2017		41.4	28.1	17.0	4.9	6.0		±3.1 pp	1,000 (1/4)	telephone (rolling)	13.3
Campaign Research	March 7, 2017		43	27	16	6	5		±3 pp	1,886	online/IVR	16
Nanos Research	March 3, 2017		39.6	30.5	17.2	5.0	5.1		±3.1 pp	1,000 (1/4)	telephone (rolling)	9.1
Forum Research	February 26, 2017		39	35	15	7	4		±3 pp	1,340	IVR	4
Nanos Research	February 24, 2017		38.9	31.0	16.8	5.4	5.2		±3.1 pp	1,000 (1/4)	telephone (rolling)	7.9
Abacus Data	February 19, 2017		40	33	16	4	6		±2.6 pp	1,500	online	7
Nanos Research	February 17, 2017		39.3	29.6	16.9	6.3	5.7		±3.1 pp	1,000 (1/4)	telephone (rolling)	9.7
Nanos Research	February 10, 2017		37.9	32.9	16.9	4.8	5.3		±3.1 pp	1,000 (1/4)	telephone (rolling)	5.0
Campaign Research	February 6, 2017		34	34	16	6	6		±3 pp	1,457	IVR	0
Nanos Research	February 3, 2017		38.0	32.5	16.4	4.9	5.9		±3.1 pp	1,000 (1/4)	telephone (rolling)	5.5
Nanos Research	January 27, 2017		39.1	32.1	16.3	5.1	5.5		±3.1 pp	1,000 (1/4)	telephone (rolling)	7.0
Ipsos	January 25, 2017		41	30	19	5			±3.5 pp	1,000	online	11
Forum Research	January 21, 2017		42	36	12	4	5		±3 pp	1,332	IVR	6
Nanos Research	January 20, 2017		39.4	31.2	16.3	5.1	5.9		±3.1 pp	1,000 (1/4)	telephone (rolling)	8.2
Nanos Research	January 13, 2017		41.4	28.4	16.2	6.1	6.1		±3.1 pp	1,000 (1/4)	telephone (rolling)	13.0
Nanos Research	January 6, 2017		43.0	28.5	16.2	5.2	5.4		±3.1 pp	1,000 (1/4)	telephone (rolling)	14.5
Nanos Research	December 30, 2016		43.0	27.9	16.7	5.5	5.9		±3.1 pp	1,000 (1/4)	telephone (rolling)	15.1
Nanos Research	December 23, 2016		42.0	28.3	16.9	5.6	5.6		±3.1 pp	1,000 (1/4)	telephone (rolling)	13.7
Nanos Research	December 16, 2016		43.6	27.4	16.7	4.9	5.6		±3.1 pp	1,000 (1/4)	telephone (rolling)	16.2
Abacus Data	December 14, 2016		44	30	16	4	5		±2.3 pp	1,848	online	14
Nanos Research	December 9, 2016		43.2	26.7	16.5	5.4	6.0		±3.1 pp	1,000 (1/4)	telephone (rolling)	16.5
Forum Research	December 7, 2016		42	34	12	5	6		±3 pp	1,304	IVR	8
Nanos Research	December 2, 2016		42.9	26.0	17.4	4.8	6.8		±3.1 pp	1,000 (1/4)	telephone (rolling)	16.9
Nanos Research	November 25, 2016		44.7	25.1	17.9	4.4	6.4		±3.1 pp	1,000 (1/4)	telephone (rolling)	19.6
EKOS	November 22, 2016		41.2	31.2	13.0	2.4	8.2		±2.2 pp	1,949	IVR	10.0
Nanos Research	November 18, 2016		42.9	28.7	16.0	5.6	5.6		±3.1 pp	1,000 (1/4)	telephone (rolling)	14.2
Abacus Data	November 13, 2016		46	25	17	5	7		±2.1 pp	2,200	online	21
Nanos Research	November 11, 2016		46.3	26.2	15.4	4.3	6.2		±3.1 pp	1,000 (1/4)	telephone (rolling)	20.1
Forum Research	November 10, 2016		51	28	11	4	5		±3 pp	1,474	IVR	23
Mainstreet Research	November 6, 2016		49	29	13	4	5		±1.38 pp	5,066	IVR	20
Nanos Research	November 4, 2016		44.9	29.6	13.8	5.5	5.5		±3.1 pp	1,000 (1/4)	telephone (rolling)	15.3
Nanos Research	October 28, 2016		44.5	29.6	13.3	5.3	6.0		±3.1 pp	1,000 (1/4)	telephone (rolling)	14.9
Nanos Research	October 21, 2016		46.6	27.5	13.9	4.0	6.8		±3.1 pp	1,000 (1/4)	telephone (rolling)	19.1
EKOS	October 18, 2016		46.6	26.4	14.1	3.3	7.8		±2.4 pp	1,622	online/telephone	20.2
Nanos Research	October 14, 2016		46.3	26.2	15.4	4.3	6.2		±3.1 pp	1,000 (1/4)	telephone (rolling)	20.1
Forum Research	October 12, 2016		49	30	12	5	4		±3 pp	1,437	IVR	19
Abacus Data	October 12, 2016		45	28	14	5	6		±2.6 pp	1,498	online	17
Nanos Research	October 7, 2016		45.9	25.9	16.2	4.3	5.7		±3.1 pp	1,000 (1/4)	telephone (rolling)	20.0
Nanos Research	September 30, 2016		45.8	26.2	16.7	4.5	5.0		±3.1 pp	1,000	telephone (rolling)	19.6
Forum Research	September 21, 2016		47	34	9	6	3		±3 pp	1,326	IVR	13
Mainstreet Research	September 8, 2016		51	29	12	4	4		±1.35 pp	5,250	IVR	22
Forum Research	September 7, 2016		48	30	11	5	4		±3 pp	1,370	IVR	18
Leger	September 1, 2016		53	25	12	4	5		±2.5 pp	1,535	online	28
Abacus Data	August 25, 2016		46	28	16	4	5		±2.2 pp	2,010	online	18
Forum Research	August 6, 2016		50	31	10	4	4		±3 pp	1,345	IVR	19
EKOS	July 14, 2016		45.6	28.5	15.5	2.8	5.9		±3.1 pp	1,003	online/telephone	17.1
Forum Research	July 5, 2016		52	28	11	5	3		±3 pp	1,429	IVR	24
Abacus Data	June 16, 2016		44	28	16	5	6		±2.6 pp	1,500	online	16
Forum Research	June 7, 2016		49	32	10	4	4		±2 pp	2,271	IVR	17
EKOS	June 7, 2016		44.7	26.9	12.4	4.1	7.8		±2.0 pp	2,371	IVR	17.8
Ipsos	May 24, 2016		46	30	15	4			±3.5 pp	1,002	online	16
Abacus Data	May 20, 2016		46	27	15	4	7		±2.2 pp	2,000	online	19
Forum Research	May 11, 2016		52	29	11	4	3		±3 pp	1,517	IVR	23
Mainstreet Research	April 27, 2016		49	30	14	3	4		±1.39 pp	4,998	IVR	19
Nanos Research	April 22, 2016		43.2	25.8	19.3	4.2	5.5		±3.1 pp	1,000	telephone	17.4
Mainstreet Research	April 15, 2016		48	30	14	3	5		±1.38 pp	5,012	IVR	18
EKOS	April 15, 2016		44.1	28.5	12.0	4.4	6.7		±2.9 pp	1,176	IVR	15.6
Abacus Data	April 13, 2016		49	26	13	5	5		±2.6 pp	1,500	online	23
Forum Research	April 5, 2016		51	28	12	6	3		±3 pp	1,455	IVR	23
Innovative Research	March 30, 2016		46	30	12	5	6		n/a	2,456	online	16
EKOS	March 29, 2016		42.1	31.7	11.7	4.8	6.4		±2.2 pp	2,019	IVR	10.4
Abacus Data	March 23, 2016		47	28	14	4	6		±2.6 pp	1,500	online	19
Abacus Data	March 18, 2016		44	29	16	4	6		±2.6 pp	1,500	online	15
Forum Research	March 15, 2016		46	34	12	4	3		±2 pp	1,567	IVR	12
Forum Research	February 17, 2016		49	32	10	3	5		±3 pp	1,406	IVR	17
Leger	February 4, 2016		49	27	15	3	5		±2.1 pp	1,524	online	22
EKOS	January 18, 2016		46.7	25.3	15.9	3.9	7.0		±1.9 pp	2,598	online/telephone	21.4
Mainstreet Research	January 15, 2016		44	32	16	3	5		±1.39 pp	4,937	IVR	12
Abacus Data	January 12, 2016		45	28	17	5	5		±2.6 pp	1,500	online	17
EKOS	December 10, 2015		46.3	27.2	15.3	3.4	6.7		±2.2 pp	1,956	online/telephone	19.1
Forum Research	December 8, 2015		46	32	13	4	4		±3 pp	1,369	IVR	14
Abacus Data	November 25, 2015		49	24	16	5	5		±2.6 pp	1,500	online	25
Forum Research	November 17, 2015		45	37	10	4	3		±3 pp	909	IVR	8
Forum Research	November 7, 2015		55	25	12	4	3		±3 pp	1,256	IVR	30
Rona Ambrose is named interim leader of the Conservative Party of Canada (November 5, 2015)
2015 election	October 19, 2015		39.5	31.9	19.7	4.7	3.4					7.6

Notes

^{1} Polls that share the same last date of polling are ordered from earliest (below) to latest (above) first date of polling. Polls that have identical field dates are placed in the order in which they were released/published (earliest below, latest above).
^{2} In cases when linked poll details distinguish between the margin of error associated with the total sample of respondents (including undecided and non-voters) and that of the subsample of decided/leaning voters, the former is included in the table. Also not included is the margin of error created by rounding to the nearest whole number or any margin of error from methodological sources. Most online polls—because of their opt-in method of recruiting panellists which results in a non-random sample—cannot have a margin of error. In such cases, shown is what the margin of error would be for a survey using a random probability-based sample of equivalent size.
^{3} Refers to the total, "raw" sample size, including undecided and non-voters, and before demographic weighting is applied. Fractions in parentheses apply to rolling polls (see below) and indicate the proportion of the sample that is independent from the previous poll in the series.
^{4} "Telephone" refers to traditional telephone polls conducted by live interviewers; "IVR" refers to automated Interactive Voice Response polls conducted by telephone; "online" refers to polls conducted exclusively over the internet; "telephone/online" refers to polls which combine results from both telephone and online surveys, or for which respondents are initially recruited by telephone and then asked to complete an online survey. "Rolling" polls contain overlapping data from one poll to the next.
^{5} The People's Party of Canada was officially created on September 14, 2018 and voting intentions for the party were therefore not polled prior to this date.

== Regional polls ==
A number of polling firms survey federal voting intentions on a regional or provincial level:

=== Atlantic Canada ===
Polling firm	Last date of polling	Link	LPC	CPC	NDP	BQ	GPC	PPC^{[1]}	Other	Margin of error^{[2]}	Sample size^{[3]}	Polling method^{[4]}	Lead
Narrative Research	August 22, 2019		43	30	10	-	15	-	2	±2.5 pp	1,500	Telephone	13
Narrative Research	May 24, 2019		39	36	9	-	14	-	2	±2.5 pp	1,500	Telephone	3

==== Newfoundland and Labrador ====
Polling firm	Last date of polling	Link	LPC	CPC	NDP	BQ	GPC	PPC^{[1]}	Other	Margin of error^{[2]}	Sample size^{[3]}	Polling method^{[4]}	Lead
MQO Research	July 31, 2019		46	38	11	-	2	2	1	±4.9 pp	400	Telephone	8
MQO Research	May 4, 2019		49	37	11	-	3	0		±4 pp	600	Telephone	12
MQO Research	January 28, 2019		56	35	6	-	1	1		±4 pp	600	Telephone	21

==== Prince Edward Island ====
Polling firm	Last date of polling	Link	LPC	CPC	NDP	BQ	GPC	PPC^{[1]}	Other	Margin of error^{[2]}	Sample size^{[3]}	Polling method^{[4]}	Lead
MQO Research	August 6, 2019		40	34	4	-	21	1		±5.7 pp	400	Telephone	6
MQO Research	April 16, 2019		40	32	8	-	18	1		±4 pp	400	Telephone	8
MQO Research	January 27, 2019		52	30	7	-	10			±4 pp	400	Telephone	22

==== Nova Scotia ====
Polling firm	Last date of polling	Link	LPC	CPC	NDP	BQ	GPC	PPC^{[1]}	Other	Margin of error^{[2]}	Sample size^{[3]}	Polling method^{[4]}	Lead
MQO Research	August 27, 2019		44	31	13	-	9	1		±4.9 pp	400	Telephone	13
MQO Research	May 13, 2019		42	35	11	-	10	0		±4 pp	600	Telephone	7
MQO Research	February 10, 2019		50	30	12	-	7	1		±4 pp	600	Telephone	20

==== New Brunswick ====
Polling firm	Last date of polling	Link	LPC	CPC	NDP	BQ	GPC	PPC^{[1]}	Other	Margin of error^{[2]}	Sample size^{[3]}	Polling method^{[4]}	Lead
MQO Research	August 14, 2019		41	40	6	-	9	4		±4.9 pp	400	Telephone	1
MQO Research	May 6, 2019		36	39	7	-	16	1		±4 pp	600	Telephone	3
MQO Research	February 10, 2019		44	39	4	-	10	3		±4 pp	600	Telephone	5

=== Central Canada ===
==== Quebec ====
Polling firm	Last date of polling	Link	LPC	CPC	NDP	BQ	GPC	PPC^{[1]}	Other	Margin of error^{[2]}	Sample size^{[3]}	Polling method^{[4]}	Lead
2019 election	October 21, 2019		34.2	16.0	10.7	32.5	4.4	1.5	0.5	—N/a	4,284,338	—N/a	1.7
Leger	October 15, 2019		31	16	14	31	6	2	-	±1.79	3000	Online	0
Forum Research	October 12, 2019		33	15	10	31	7	2	2	±3 pp	1001	IVR	2
Leger	October 10, 2019		31	16	13	29	7	3	1	-	1014	Online	2
Mainstreet Research	October 6, 2019		35	17	11	27	7	3	-	±3.75 pp	685	IVR	8
Mainstreet Research	September 30, 2019		37	18	10	22	9	3	-	±3.7 pp	694	IVR	15
Nanos Research	September 30, 2019		35.3	17.0	13.3	22.0	10.1	1.8	0.6	±3.6 pp	828	telephone	13.3
Leger	September 17, 2019		36	21	7	22	10	3	1	±3.9 pp	837	Online	14
Mainstreet Research	September 13, 2019		33.0	24.8	7.9	18.6	9.5	-	-	unknown	unknown	IVR	8.2
Leger	August 29, 2019		34	23	7	20	11	4	1	±3.39 pp	837	Online	11
Forum Research	August 28, 2019		37	21	8	18	9	4		±3 pp	1219	IVR	16
Forum Research	July 24, 2019		30	28	9	15	10	4	3	±3 pp	977	IVR	2
Forum Research	June 12, 2019		32	25	9	18	10	4	2	±3 pp	1,471	IVR	7
Leger	March 11, 2019		35	26	7	17	9	4		±3.08 pp	1,014	Online	9
Leger	January 28, 2019		39	21	8	21	5	6		±3.09 pp	1,007	Online	18
CROP	June 19, 2018		42	27	10	12	8		0	—N/a	1,000	Online	15
Leger	August 24, 2017		43	16	19	16	6		2	±3 pp	1,002	Online	27
2015 election	October 19, 2015		35.7	16.7	25.4	19.4	2.2	—N/a	0.7	—N/a	4,241,487	—N/a	19

==== Ontario ====
Polling firm	Last date of polling	Link	LPC	CPC	NDP	BQ	GPC	PPC^{[1]}	Other	Margin of error^{[2]}	Sample size^{[3]}	Polling method^{[4]}	Lead
Campaign Research	September 19, 2019		35	39	12	-	10	2	1	±2.17 pp	2035	Online/Telephone	4
Angus Reid	September 18, 2019		36	35	15	-	9	5	-	-	722	online	1
EKOS	September 5, 2019		40.8	29.9	10.9	-	11.9	4.8	1.8	±2.0 pp	2393	IVR	10.9
EKOS	August 28, 2019		46.7	29.2	7.6	-	9.4	5.7	1.3	±4.97 pp	389	IVR	17.5
EKOS	August 27, 2019		44	30	10	-	10	4	2	±1.9 pp	2601	IVR	14
EKOS	August 19, 2019		42.9	29.9	8.6	-	13.7	2.5	2.5	±5.39 pp	301	IVR	13
Corbett Communications	August 13, 2019		39	31	14	-	12	4	1	±3 pp	1099	Online	8
EKOS	August 9, 2019		40.3	28.9	11.9	-	12.2	5.2	1.5	±4.90 pp	400	IVR	11.4
EKOS	July 26, 2019		33.8	35.8	9.5	-	13.2	4.5	3.2	±4.89 pp	402	IVR	2
Corbett Communications	July 10, 2019		38	33	14	-	13	1	0	±3 pp	481	Online	5
Innovative Research	April 16, 2019		40	33	14	-	9	-	4		945	Online	7
Innovative Research	April 10, 2019		41	34	13	-	9	-	4		773	Online	7
Innovative Research	April 1, 2019		39	33	18	-	7	-	3	±4 pp	605	Telephone	6

===== Toronto =====
Polling firm	Last date of polling	Link	LPC	CPC	NDP	BQ	GPC	PPC^{[1]}	Other	Margin of error^{[2]}	Sample size^{[3]}	Polling method^{[4]}	Lead
Forum Research	September 26, 2019		50	26	10	-	10	3	1	±3 pp	1,059	IVR	24
Forum Research	July 6, 2019		46	26	12	-	10	4	2	±3 pp	1,143	IVR	20

=== Western Canada ===
==== Manitoba ====
Polling firm	Last date of polling	Link	LPC	CPC	NDP	BQ	GPC	PPC^{[1]}	Other	Margin of error^{[2]}	Sample size^{[3]}	Polling method^{[4]}	Lead
Probe Research	September 26, 2019		27	41	19	-	9	3	1	±3.1 pp	1,000	telephone	14
Probe Research	June 17, 2019		24	43	17	-	13	2	1	±3.1 pp	1,000	telephone	19
Probe Research	March 24, 2019		31	42	17	-	7	3	1	±3.1 pp	1,000	telephone	11
Probe Research	December 6, 2018		34	42	16	-	5	2	1	±2.9 pp	1,105	telephone	8

==== Saskatchewan ====
Polling firm	Last date of polling	Link	LPC	CPC	NDP	BQ	GPC	PPC^{[1]}	Other	Margin of error^{[2]}	Sample size^{[3]}	Polling method^{[4]}	Lead
U of Saskatchewan	September 2019		5	41	11	-	8	1	-	±4.9 pp	400	telephone	30

==== Alberta ====
Polling firm	Last date of polling	Link	LPC	CPC	NDP	BQ	GPC	PPC^{[1]}	Other	Margin of error^{[2]}	Sample size^{[3]}	Polling method^{[4]}	Lead
Lethbridge College	October 10, 2019		17.9	64.0	9.7	-	4.1	1.9	2.4	±3.17 pp	953	telephone	46.1
Lethbridge College	February 5, 2019		12.9	71.4	9.3	-	1.9	2.1	2.3	±3.0 pp	1,055	telephone	58.5

==== British Columbia ====
Polling firm	Last date of polling	Link	LPC	CPC	NDP	BQ	GPC	PPC^{[1]}	Other	Margin of error^{[2]}	Sample size^{[3]}	Polling method^{[4]}	Lead
Insights West	October 16, 2019		20	27	23	-	11	-	2	±2.4 pp	1670	Online	4
Insights West	September 23, 2019		19	29	14	-	14	-	3	±3.3 pp	867	Online	10
Insights West	September 10, 2019		17	29	14	-	13	-	4	±3.4 pp	869	Online	12

== Leadership polls ==
Aside from conducting the usual opinion surveys on general party preferences, polling firms also survey public opinion on who would make the best prime minister:

=== February 2019–October 2019 ===
Polling firm	Last date of polling	Link	Justin Trudeau	Andrew Scheer	Jagmeet Singh	Yves-François Blanchet	Elizabeth May	Maxime Bernier	Unsure	Margin of error^{[1]}	Lead
Nanos Research	September 6, 2019		33.6	22.7	7.4	1.4	8.1	2.4	24.4	±3.1 pp	10.9
Nanos Research	August 30, 2019		32.2	23.2	7.2	1.3	8.3	2.8	25.1	±3.1 pp	9.0
Nanos Research	August 23, 2019		30.9	25.1	6.7	1.4	8.7	2.6	24.6	±3.1 pp	5.8
Nanos Research	August 16, 2019		31.8	23.9	7.5	1.7	8.4	2.5	24.1	±3.1 pp	7.9
Nanos Research	August 9, 2019		31.4	25	7	1.8	8.5	1.9	24.3	±3.1 pp	6.4
Nanos Research	August 2, 2019		33.8	24.4	6.8	1.8	9.2	1.6	22.3	±3.1 pp	9.4
Forum Research	July 28, 2019		28	28	7	-	14	-	23	±3 pp	0
Nanos Research	July 26, 2019		32.5	24.1	7.7	2.5	9.1	1.6	22.4	±3.1 pp	8.4
Leger	July 23, 2019		23	24	7		9	4	20	±2.5 pp	1
Nanos Research	July 19, 2019		32.8	24.0	8.0	2.3	8.8	1.8	22.3	±3.1 pp	8.8
Abacus Data	July 17, 2019		36	31	13		14	6		±2.6 pp	5
Ipsos	July 15, 2019		32	36	13	2	17			±3.5 pp	4
Campaign Research	July 12, 2019		24	20	7	1	9	3	21	±2.3 pp	4
Nanos Research	July 12, 2019		32.9	23.1	8.9	1.8	7.9	2.2	23.2	±3.1 pp	9.8
Nanos Research	June 21, 2019		27.9	24.0	9.7	1.6	7.7	2.1	27.0	±3.1 pp	2.9
Nanos Research	June 14, 2019		27.0	24.9	9.9	1.5	9.4	1.8	25.6	±2.3 pp	2.1
Campaign Research	June 9, 2019		24	24	7	1	9	4	17	±2.6 pp	0
Abacus Data	June 1, 2019		33	30	12		19	6		±2.6 pp	3
Nanos Research	May 31, 2019		26.5	26.7	8.9	1.7	9.6	1.6	24.9	±3.1 pp	0.2
Nanos Research	May 17, 2019		27.9	28.6	6.8	1.5	10.0	1.8	23.3	±3.1 pp	0.8
Abacus Data	May 3, 2019		34	33	14		14	6		±1.5 pp	1
Leger	April 22, 2019		20	25	7		8	3	21	±2.5 pp	5
Leger	March 20, 2019		24	25	8		7	4	19	±2.51 pp	1
Nanos Research	March 15, 2019		30.3	27.3	8.9	1.7	7.2	2.8	21.8	±3.1 pp	3.0
Abacus Data	March 10, 2019		39	31	10		13	7		±3.3 pp	8
Campaign Research	March 10, 2019		23	24	7	1	8		19	±2.5 pp	1
Abacus Data	March 6, 2019		35	33	13		13	7		±3.3 pp (final)	2
Nanos Research	March 1, 2019		35.2	25.0	6.2	1.8	7.3	2.1	22.5	±3.1 pp	10.2
Nanos Research	February 15, 2019		35.7	23.4	5.3	1.6	7.7	2.7	22.1	±3.1 pp	12.3
Campaign Research	February 11, 2019		28	25	4	6	1		17	±2.5 pp	3
Nanos Research	February 8, 2019		35.5	24.9	5.9	1.4	6.4	3.8	22.1	±3.1 pp	10.6

=== September 2018–February 2019 ===
Polling firm	Last date of polling	Link	Justin Trudeau	Andrew Scheer	Jagmeet Singh	Mario Beaulieu	Elizabeth May	Maxime Bernier	Unsure	Margin of error^{[1]}	Lead
Nanos Research	February 1, 2019		34.1	24.9	6.8	1.2	6.7	5.2	21.2	±3.1 pp	9.2
Nanos Research	January 25, 2019		33.5	26.1	7.5	1.2	6.7	4.9	20.1	±3.1 pp	7.4
Nanos Research	January 18, 2019		34.6	24.8	7.5	1.1	6.7	4.4	20.9	±3.1 pp	9.8
Nanos Research	January 11, 2019		36.4	23.9	6.8	1.3	6.2	4.5	20.9	±3.1 pp	12.5
Nanos Research	January 4, 2019		39.3	23.5	6.5	1.2	5.4	3.9	20.1	±3.1 pp	15.8
Nanos Research	December 28, 2018		39.1	23.7	5.0	1.0	5.7	4.2	21.3	±3.1 pp	15.4
Nanos Research	December 21, 2018		38.3	24.8	5.0	0.9	5.8	4.1	21.1	±3.1 pp	13.5
Abacus Data	December 18, 2018		45	29	10		10	5		±2.5 pp	16
Angus Reid	December 18, 2018		27	33	6		7		26	±2.5 pp	6
Nanos Research	December 14, 2018		37.4	25.6	6.3	0.7	5.4	2.6	22.0	±3.1 pp	11.8
Campaign Research	December 13, 2018		32	22	5	1	7		17	±2.5 pp	10
Nanos Research	December 7, 2018		35.8	25.0	5.6	0.6	6.0	2.1	25.0	±3.1 pp	10.8
Nanos Research	November 30, 2018		37.5	23.4	5.7	0.6	5.5	2.5	24.9	±3.1 pp	14.1
Forum Research	November 29, 2018		33	32	6		8		22	±3 pp	1
Nanos Research	November 23, 2018		38.2	21.9	5.8	0.9	5.7	2.3	25.2	±3.1 pp	16.3
Leger	November 20, 2018		33	22	5		6	5		±2.51 pp	11
Nanos Research	November 16, 2018		39.5	20.2	7.7	0.7	5.5	2.2	24.3	±3.1 pp	19.3
Campaign Research	November 9, 2018		32	22	6		6		17	±2.5 pp	10
Nanos Research	November 9, 2018		41.7	20.0	8.6	1.0	5.5	2.6	20.6	±3.1 pp	21.7
Nanos Research	November 2, 2018		41.2	20.3	8.2	1.2	6.3	2.4	20.4	±3.1 pp	20.9
Nanos Research	October 26, 2018		40.8	21.3	8.0	1.6	5.5	2.7	20.0	±3.1 pp	19.5
Nanos Research	October 19, 2018		37.9	22.9	7.5	1.6	6.2	2.5	21.4	±3.1 pp	15.0
Nanos Research	October 12, 2018		39.1	23.4	7.1	1.0	5.5	3.1	20.9	±3.1 pp	15.7
Innovative Research	October 1, 2018		47	29	9	2	8			n/a	18
Pollara	September 20, 2018		39	27	8			5	21	±3.1 pp	12

=== August–September 2018 ===
Polling firm	Last date of polling	Link	Justin Trudeau	Andrew Scheer	Jagmeet Singh	Mario Beaulieu	Elizabeth May	Margin of error^{[1]}	Lead
Nanos Research	September 28, 2018		41.4	24.7	7.8	0.5	5.5	±3.1 pp	16.7
Nanos Research	September 21, 2018		43.1	25.0	7.5	0.8	5.6	±3.1 pp	18.1
Pollara	September 20, 2018		39	27	8	—	5	±3.1 pp	12
Campaign Research	September 14, 2018		32	22	5	5		±2.5 pp	10
Nanos Research	August 31, 2018		42.2	24.3	6.8	1.0	6.4	±3.1 pp	17.9
Nanos Research	August 24, 2018		40.1	25.4	7.7	1.3	5.2	±3.1 pp	14.7
Nanos Research	August 17, 2018		39.6	25.2	8.2	1.2	4.6	±3.1 pp	14.4

=== October 2017–July 2018 ===
Polling firm	Last date of polling	Link	Justin Trudeau	Andrew Scheer	Jagmeet Singh	Martine Ouellet	Elizabeth May	Margin of error^{[1]}	Lead
Nanos Research	July 27, 2018		40.4	24.5	6.5	1.2	5.8	±3.1 pp	15.9
Nanos Research	July 20, 2018		40.5	25.2	6.3	1.3	5.9	±3.1 pp	15.3
Nanos Research	July 6, 2018		42.6	24.4	7.1	0.9	6.0	±3.1 pp	18.2
Nanos Research	June 22, 2018		41.3	24.8	8.2	1.1	4.9	±3.1 pp	16.5
Nanos Research	June 15, 2018		38.7	25.4	8.8	0.8	4.3	±3.1 pp	13.3
Angus Reid	June 14, 2018		35	22	7	–	6	±3.1 pp	13
Nanos Research	June 1, 2018		34.3	25.6	10.0	1.2	5.7	±3.1 pp	8.7
Nanos Research	May 25, 2018		36.0	25.2	9.3	1.3	6.4	±3.1 pp	10.8
Nanos Research	May 18, 2018		39.2	22.4	8.1	1.3	6.8	±3.1 pp	16.8
Nanos Research	May 11, 2018		39.6	20.9	8.1	0.9	7.7	±3.1 pp	18.7
Forum Research	April 20, 2018		24	25	8	3	12	±2 pp	1
Nanos Research	March 23, 2018		38.5	26.5	8.9	1.9	4.9	±3.1 pp	12.0
Nanos Research	March 16, 2018		37.5	25.9	9.0	2.4	5.7	±3.1 pp	11.6
Angus Reid	March 15, 2018		26	22	7	–	–	±2 pp	4
Nanos Research	March 9, 2018		39.2	23.2	9.4	2.6	5.9	±3.1 pp	16.0
Nanos Research	March 2, 2018		40.4	22.8	8.6	1.8	6.6	±3.1 pp	17.6
Nanos Research	February 23, 2018		40.4	22.1	9.5	1.9	5.6	±3.1 pp	18.3
Nanos Research	February 16, 2018		41.0	21.9	9.3	1.5	5.4	±3.1 pp	20.1
Campaign Research	February 10, 2018		35	15	7	2	5	±2.1 pp	20
Nanos Research	January 26, 2018		40.8	22.1	8.3	2.3	5.8	±3.1 pp	18.7
Nanos Research	January 12, 2018		42.7	22.3	8.1	1.8	5.2	±3.1 pp	20.4
Nanos Research	January 5, 2018		45.6	20.3	9.0	1.4	4.1	±3.1 pp	25.3
Nanos Research	December 29, 2017		46.9	21.5	9.1	1.0	3.9	±3.1 pp	25.4
Nanos Research	December 22, 2017		48.3	22.0	7.9	0.8	4.5	±3.1 pp	26.3
Nanos Research	December 15, 2017		46.8	21.9	8.2	1.0	5.9	±3.1 pp	24.9
Forum Research	December 14, 2017		30	21	9	5	10	±3.1 pp	9
Nanos Research	December 8, 2017		45.4	23.5	8.0	1.3	6.4	±3.1 pp	21.9
Nanos Research	December 1, 2017		45.6	22.8	6.6	2.0	6.1	±3.1 pp	22.8
Nanos Research	November 24, 2017		44.1	22.8	7.2	1.6	5.3	±3.1 pp	21.3
Nanos Research	November 17, 2017		44.8	22.4	7.7	1.6	4.8	±3.1 pp	22.4
Nanos Research	November 10, 2017		45.0	21.1	8.8	1.4	5.2	±3.1 pp	23.9
Campaign Research	November 9, 2017		35	15	7	5	5	±2.2 pp	20
Nanos Research	November 3, 2017		43.8	21.0	8.5	1.9	5.4	±3.1 pp	22.8
Nanos Research	October 27, 2017		44.3	20.8	9.2	2.3	5.5	±3.1 pp	23.5
Campaign Research	October 11, 2017		36	14	6	1	5	±2.2 pp	22

=== October 2017 ===
Polling firm	Last date of polling	Link	Justin Trudeau	Andrew Scheer	Jagmeet Singh/ Thomas Mulcair	Martine Ouellet	Elizabeth May	Margin of error^{[1]}	Lead
Nanos Research	October 20, 2017		42.2	22.4	9.5	2.0	5.2	±3.1 pp	19.8
Nanos Research	October 13, 2017		41.9	22.5	8.7	1.6	5.3	±3.1 pp	19.4
Nanos Research	October 6, 2017		43.9	21.7	9.3	1.2	4.0	±3.1 pp	22.2

=== June–September 2017 ===
Polling firm	Last date of polling	Link	Justin Trudeau	Andrew Scheer	Thomas Mulcair	Martine Ouellet	Elizabeth May	Margin of error^{[1]}	Lead
Nanos Research	September 29, 2017		43.9	20.3	9.7	1.3	4.0	±3.1 pp	23.6
Nanos Research	September 22, 2017		45.3	21.2	9.4	1.5	4.3	±3.1 pp	24.1
Nanos Research	September 15, 2017		46.3	19.7	10.1	1.5	4.1	±3.1 pp	26.6
Forum Research	September 14, 2017		34	20	12	4	5	±3 pp	14
Campaign Research	September 11, 2017		42	13	8	2	6	±2.3 pp	29
Nanos Research	September 8, 2017		47.8	19.7	9.7	1.3	3.7	±3.1 pp	28.1
Nanos Research	September 1, 2017		46.2	21.7	9.8	1.6	4.0	±3.1 pp	24.5
Nanos Research	August 25, 2017		48.0	20.4	9.0	1.3	4.3	±3.1 pp	27.6
Nanos Research	August 18, 2017		47.5	21.6	8.4	1.1	4.4	±3.1 pp	25.9
Forum Research	August 17, 2017		39	18	10	2	8	±3 pp	21
Nanos Research	August 11, 2017		47.1	21.3	9.2	1.4	4.9	±3.1 pp	25.8
Nanos Research	August 4, 2017		46.1	21.8	9.8	1.7	5.1	±3.1 pp	24.3
Nanos Research	July 28, 2017		44.0	21.5	9.7	1.6	6.0	±3.1 pp	22.5
Nanos Research	July 21, 2017		45.4	20.8	10.1	1.4	5.5	±3.1 pp	24.6
Nanos Research	July 14, 2017		43.9	21.9	9.8	1.4	5.5	±3.1 pp	22.0
Campaign Research	July 10, 2017		38	17	8	1	4	±2 pp	21
Nanos Research	July 7, 2017		45.6	21.4	8.1	0.7	5.4	±3.1 pp	24.2
Nanos Research	June 30, 2017		46.9	21.5	7.9	1.1	4.0	±3.1 pp	25.4
Nanos Research	June 23, 2017		46.3	21.2	8.4	1.0	4.5	±3.1 pp	25.1
Angus Reid	June 12, 2017		37	19	10			±2 pp	18
Forum Research	June 8, 2017		39	20	9	3	8	±3 pp	19

=== June 2017 ===
Polling firm	Last date of polling	Link	Justin Trudeau	Rona Ambrose/ Andrew Scheer	Thomas Mulcair	Martine Ouellet	Elizabeth May	Margin of error^{[1]}	Lead
Nanos Research	June 16, 2017		45.8	19.8	8.5	1.2	5.3	±3.1 pp	26.0
Nanos Research	June 9, 2017		43.6	19.2	9.1	1.3	5.3	±3.1 pp	24.4
Nanos Research	June 2, 2017		45.9	18.5	8.9	1.5	5.1	±3.1 pp	27.4

=== April–May 2017 ===
Polling firm	Last date of polling	Link	Justin Trudeau	Rona Ambrose	Thomas Mulcair	Martine Ouellet	Elizabeth May	Margin of error^{[1]}	Lead
Nanos Research	May 26, 2017		45.7	18.4	9.1	0.2	4.9	±3.1 pp	27.3
Nanos Research	May 19, 2017		46.3	18.4	9.2	1.9	5.2	±3.1 pp	27.9
Nanos Research	May 12, 2017		47.8	19.4	10.3	2.0	5.4	±3.1 pp	28.4
Nanos Research	May 5, 2017		46.9	18.7	10.7	2.0	5.4	±3.1 pp	28.2
Nanos Research	April 28, 2017		48.2	18.4	9.4	1.6	5.4	±3.1 pp	29.8
Forum Research	April 24, 2017		32	12	10	2	8	±3 pp	20
Nanos Research	April 21, 2017		47.8	18.6	9.2	0.2	5.1	±3.1 pp	29.2
Nanos Research	April 13, 2017		46.5	19.4	8.7	1.7	5.3	±3.1 pp	27.1

=== March–April 2017 ===
Polling firm	Last date of polling	Link	Justin Trudeau	Rona Ambrose	Thomas Mulcair	Rhéal Fortin/ Martine Ouellet	Elizabeth May	Margin of error^{[1]}	Lead
Nanos Research	April 7, 2017		47.0	19.3	10.5	1.3	4.6	±3.1 pp	27.7
Nanos Research	March 31, 2017		47.2	18.1	11.6	1.5	4.9	±3.1 pp	29.1
Nanos Research	March 24, 2017		48.7	18.1	10.7	0.9	5.0	±3.1 pp	30.6

=== December 2015–March 2017 ===
Polling firm	Last date of polling	Link	Justin Trudeau	Rona Ambrose	Thomas Mulcair	Rhéal Fortin	Elizabeth May	Margin of error^{[1]}	Lead
Nanos Research	March 17, 2017		49.7	17.3	10.6	0.8	4.3	±3.1 pp	32.4
Nanos Research	March 10, 2017		48.7	17.0	10.8	0.8	4.9	±3.1 pp	31.7
Nanos Research	March 3, 2017		47.0	17.4	10.2	0.9	5.2	±3.1 pp	29.6
Nanos Research	February 24, 2017		46.3	18.3	9.9	0.9	4.9	±3.1 pp	28.0
Nanos Research	February 17, 2017		46.1	17.3	10.9	1.2	4.9	±3.1 pp	28.8
Nanos Research	February 10, 2017		46.4	19.1	9.6	1.0	4.9	±3.1 pp	27.3
Campaign Research	February 6, 2017		31	14	11			±3 pp	17
Nanos Research	February 3, 2017		45.4	20.0	10.2	1.2	5.5	±3.1 pp	25.4
Nanos Research	January 27, 2017		46.7	19.9	10.7	1.1	4.7	±3.1 pp	26.8
Forum Research	January 21, 2017		38	11	9	2	6	±3 pp	27
Nanos Research	January 20, 2017		46.6	20.3	10.2	0.9	5.1	±3.1 pp	26.3
Nanos Research	January 13, 2017		46.7	18.8	11.1	0.8	5.1	±3.1 pp	27.9
Nanos Research	January 6, 2017		49.3	18.1	10.0	0.5	4.0	±3.1 pp	31.2
Nanos Research	December 30, 2016		49.0	17.7	9.6	0.8	4.7	±3.1 pp	31.3
Nanos Research	December 23, 2016		50.6	17.1	8.8	0.9	4.6	±3.1 pp	33.5
Nanos Research	December 9, 2016		54.1	15.8	7.4	1.0	5.4	±3.1 pp	38.3
Nanos Research	December 2, 2016		54.0	15.5	8.5	1.1	5.3	±3.1 pp	38.5
Forum Research	December 7, 2016		40	14	12	2	6	±3 pp	26
Nanos Research	November 25, 2016		54.2	15.7	8.7	0.7	5.5	±3.1 pp	38.5
Nanos Research	November 18, 2016		52.2	17.1	8.3	0.5	5.3	±3.1 pp	35.1
Nanos Research	November 11, 2016		50.3	16.7	8.7	0.7	5.5	±3.1 pp	33.6
Nanos Research	November 4, 2016		49.5	16.2	8.3	0.5	5.6	±3.1 pp	33.3
Nanos Research	October 28, 2016		49.6	16.0	8.2	0.5	5.7	±3.1 pp	33.6
Nanos Research	October 21, 2016		50.4	14.6	8.4	0.6	6.1	±3.1 pp	35.8
Nanos Research	October 14, 2016		52.2	14.7	8.6	0.7	5.4	±3.1 pp	37.6
Nanos Research	October 7, 2016		55.9	14.5	7.7	0.6	4.5	±3.1 pp	41.4
Nanos Research	September 30, 2016		56.0	14.1	7.4	0.6	4.4	±3.1 pp	41.9
Nanos Research	September 23, 2016		55.9	15.0	7.9	1.1	3.8	±3.1 pp	40.9
Forum Research	September 21, 2016		44	13	8	2	7	±3 pp	31
Nanos Research	September 16, 2016		53.9	15.6	8.3	1.3	3.7	±3.1 pp	38.3
Nanos Research	September 9, 2016		53.7	16.7	8.0	1.5	3.8	±3.1 pp	37.0
Forum Research	September 7, 2016		46	13	8	1	7	±3 pp	33
Nanos Research	September 2, 2016		54.1	16.5	7.9	1.8	3.6	±3.1 pp	37.6
Nanos Research	August 26, 2016		54.4	16.7	9.3	1.5	3.6	±3.1 pp	37.7
Nanos Research	August 19, 2016		56.3	16.3	9.0	1.2	3.3	±3.1 pp	40.0
Nanos Research	August 12, 2016		55.6	14.5	9.2	1.3	4.3	±3.1 pp	41.1
Forum Research	August 6, 2016		50	12	8	1	7	±3.0 pp	38
Nanos Research	August 5, 2016		55.4	15.1	9.2	1.0	4.6	±3.1 pp	40.3
Nanos Research	July 29, 2016		54.1	14.9	9.2	0.6	4.9	±3.1 pp	39.2
Nanos Research	July 22, 2016		52.3	15.9	9.2	0.5	4.9	±3.1 pp	36.4
Nanos Research	July 15, 2016		52.7	17.0	9.0	0.2	4.4	±3.1 pp	35.7
Nanos Research	July 8, 2016		52.3	16.7	9.8	0.7	4.1	±3.1 pp	35.6
Forum Research	July 5, 2016		49	13	9	1	7	±2 pp	36
Nanos Research	June 30, 2016		52.5	17.6	8.5	1.3	4.9	±3.1 pp	34.9
Nanos Research	June 24, 2016		53.4	15.9	8.8	1.5	5.2	±3.1 pp	37.5
Nanos Research	June 17, 2016		53.6	15.1	8.3	1.4	5.0	±3.1 pp	38.5
Nanos Research	June 10, 2016		52.6	15.8	8.0	1.3	5.0	±3.1 pp	36.8
Forum Research	June 7, 2016		45	11	9	2	6	±2 pp	34
Nanos Research	June 3, 2016		53.5	14.5	8.6	1.0	4.3	±3.1 pp	39
Nanos Research	May 27, 2016		53.7	15.5	8.2	1.0	3.8	±3.1 pp	38.2
Nanos Research	May 20, 2016		53.8	15.6	9.0	1.2	3.6	±3.1 pp	38.2
Nanos Research	May 13, 2016		53.0	15.8	10.1	1.3	3.4	±3.1 pp	37.2
Forum Research	May 11, 2016		47	13	10	2	6	±3 pp	34
Nanos Research	May 6, 2016		51.9	15.3	10.3	1.2	5.3	±3.1 pp	36.6
Nanos Research	April 29, 2016		51.6	15.2	10.7	0.8	5.8	±3.1 pp	36.4
Nanos Research	April 22, 2016		50.4	16.7	10.6	0.7	5.8	±3.1 pp	33.7
Nanos Research	April 15, 2016		51.1	16.6	9.7	0.5	6.0	±3.1 pp	34.5
Nanos Research	April 8, 2016		52.3	16.9	10.6	0.5	4.2	±3.1 pp	35.4
Forum Research	April 5, 2016		47	11	10	1	7	±3 pp	36
Nanos Research	April 1, 2016		51.3	17.5	11.6	0.8	3.3	±3.1 pp	33.8
Innovative Research	March 30, 2016		60.0	21.0	12.0	1.0	6.0	n/a	39.0
Nanos Research	March 24, 2016		51.4	17.0	11.6	1.1	3.9	±3.1 pp	34.4
Nanos Research	March 18, 2016		52.8	14.9	12.7	0.6	4.4	±3.1 pp	37.9
Forum Research	March 15, 2016		43	13	10	1	5	±2 pp	30
Nanos Research	March 11, 2016		52.7	14.6	12.8	0.7	4.7	±3.1 pp	38.1
Nanos Research	March 4, 2016		53.7	14.2	11.3	0.9	5.3	±3.1 pp	39.5
Nanos Research	February 26, 2016		53.5	13.9	10.9	0.9	5.0	±3.1 pp	39.6
Nanos Research	February 19, 2016		51.4	14.9	11.4	1.0	4.8	±3.1 pp	36.5
Forum Research	February 17, 2016		47	12	8	1	7	±3 pp	35
Nanos Research	February 12, 2016		51.4	15.1	10.7	1.0	4.4	±3.1 pp	36.3
Leger	February 9, 2016		40	9	10		4	±2.1 pp	30
Nanos Research	February 5, 2016		51.0	14.8	12.2	0.9	4.1	±3.1 pp	36.2
Nanos Research	January 29, 2016		50.0	14.9	13.0	0.7	4.4	±3.1 pp	35.1
Nanos Research	January 22, 2016		52.2	14.6	11.5	0.9	3.5	±3.1 pp	37.6
Nanos Research	January 15, 2016		53.5	13.7	10.6	1.0	4.5	±3.1 pp	39.8
Nanos Research	January 8, 2016		53.2	13.2	10.3	1.1	4.2	±3.1 pp	40.0
Nanos Research	January 2, 2016		52.6	12.1	11.6	1.2	4.8	±3.1 pp	40.5
Nanos Research	December 25, 2015		53.1	11.3	12.7	1.2	5.1	±3.1 pp	40.4
Nanos Research	December 18, 2015		50.2	12.9	13.0	1.3	5.1	±3.1 pp	37.2
Nanos Research	December 11, 2015		51.5	13.7	12.8	1.2	5.0	±3.1 pp	37.8
Nanos Research	December 4, 2015		53.7	13.7	12.0	1.4	4.2	±3.1 pp	40.0

=== November 2015 ===
Polling firm	Last date of polling	Link	Justin Trudeau	Stephen Harper/ Rona Ambrose	Thomas Mulcair	Rhéal Fortin	Elizabeth May	Margin of error^{[1]}	Lead
Nanos Research	November 27, 2015		50.9	16.3	12.3	1.6	4.8	±3.1 pp	34.6
Nanos Research	November 20, 2015		53.3	17.2	11.6	1.2	4.6	±3.1 pp	36.1
Nanos Research	November 13, 2015		50.9	18.4	13.0	1.3	5.0	±3.1 pp	32.5

== See also ==
- Opinion polling for the 2021 Canadian federal election
- Opinion polling for the 2019 Canadian federal election, by constituency
- Opinion polling for the 2015 Canadian federal election
- Opinion polling for the 2011 Canadian federal election
- Opinion polling for the 2008 Canadian federal election
- Opinion polling for the 2006 Canadian federal election
