= Jean-Marc Léger =

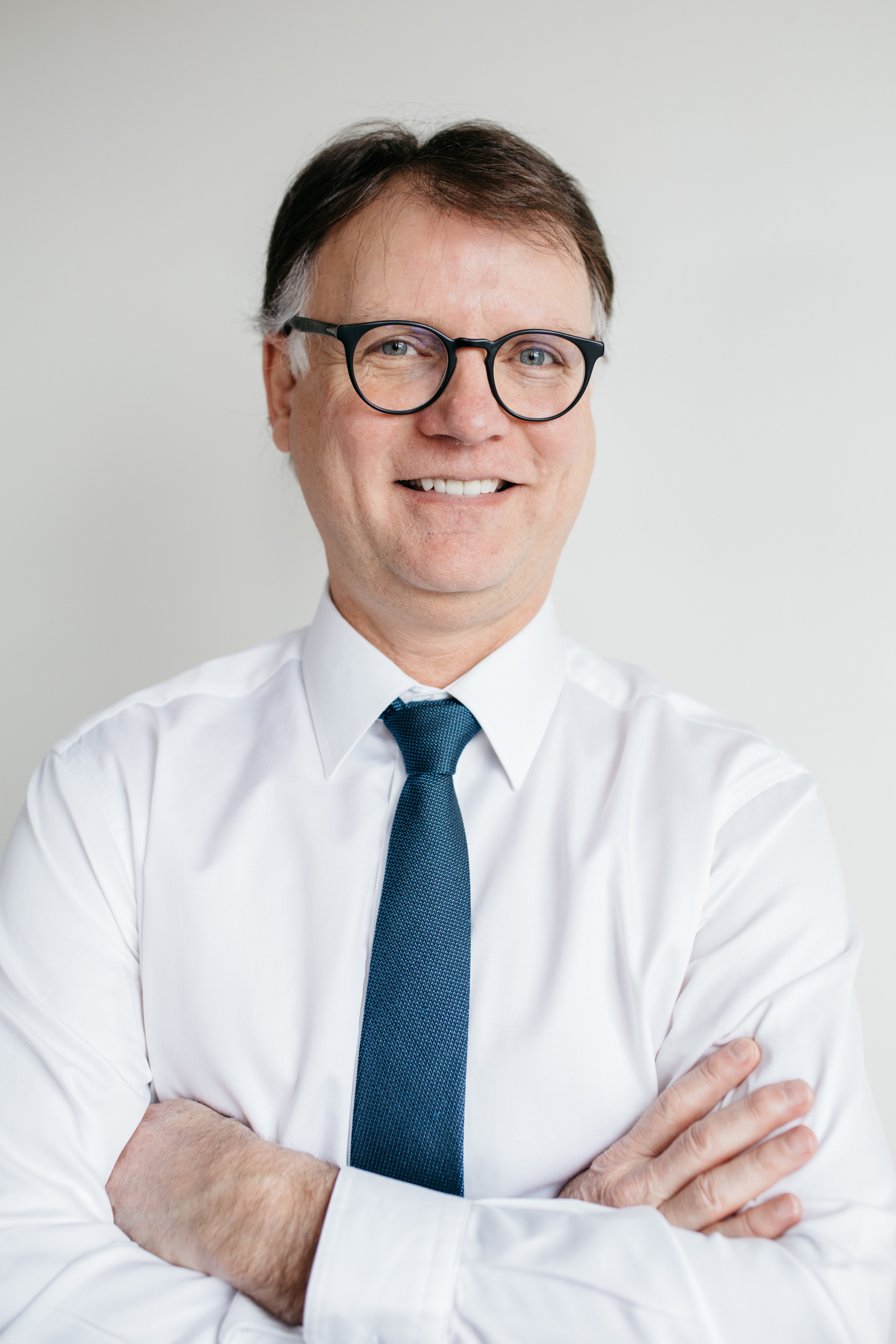
- Jean-Marc Léger in 2017
- Born: 1961 (age 64–65)
- Occupation: Economist
- Father: Marcel Léger
- Website: leger360.com

Jean-Marc Léger (born 1961) is a Canadian economist, business executive, and writer who is the founding President of market research firm Léger. Léger is the author of the book Cracking the Quebec Code and is recognized as an expert on consumer behaviour and millennials

== Career ==
Léger founded this firm with his father Marcel Léger in 1986 under the name Léger & Léger. Under his leadership, the company made ten acquisitions in Canada and the United States. Today, Léger has more than 600 employees in offices across Canada (Montreal, Quebec City, Toronto, Edmonton, Calgary, Winnipeg and Vancouver) and in the United States (Philadelphia).

Léger is a member of the Board of Directors of Groupe TVA, Groupe Sportscene (owner of La Cage - Brasserie sportive), Capsana, the Fondation de l'entrepreneurship and the CRIC (Canadian Research Insights Council). He was Chairman of the Board of the Université du Québec à Montréal from 1999 to 2003 and of the Publicité Club de Montréal from 2002 to 2003. He was also President of the Board of Trade of Metropolitan Montreal between 2013 and 2015 and of the Worldwide Independent Network of Market Research, which includes the largest independent marketing research firms. In 2020, he became appointed as one of the two Canadian representative for ESOMAR , the global community which represents data, research, insights and analytics professionals .

== Books ==
Léger is the author of the best-selling book Cracking the Quebec Code and is recognized as an expert on consumer behaviour and millennials. He is a specialist of the American market and is frequently featured in the North American media. He appears regularly on television programs, particularly during Quebec and Canadian elections, as a public opinion specialist. He is also a columnist for the Journal de Montréal.

== Bibliography ==
- Cracking the Quebec Code, in collaboration with Jacques Nantel and Pierre Duhamel, Éditions de l'Homme, 2016, 237 pages

== See also ==
- Marcel Léger (father)
- Nicole Léger (sister)
