= Jean-Claude Gobé =

Canadian politician (born 1949)

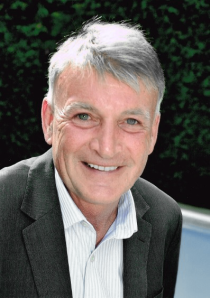
- A Quebec politician

Member of the National Assembly of Quebec for LaFontaine
- In office December 2, 1985 – April 14, 2003
- Preceded by: Marcel Léger
- Succeeded by: Tony Tomassi

Personal details
- Born: April 11, 1949 (age 77) Charleville, France
- Party: Liberal (federal); Action Laval (municipal)
- Other political affiliations: Action démocratique du Québec (2008-2012); Quebec Liberal Party (1985-2003)
- Profession: Politician

Military service
- Allegiance: France
- Branch/service: French Navy
- Years of service: 1967 — 1971
- Unit: 7th Infantry Regiment

Jean-Claude Gobé (born April 11, 1949) is a Quebec politician. He served as the member for LaFontaine in the Quebec National Assembly as a member of the Quebec Liberal Party from 1985 until 2003. He left the Liberals to sit as an Independent shortly before his term in the National Assembly ended. Until resigning in 2018, he was the leader of the Official Opposition in the City of Laval as head of Action Laval.

== Biography ==
Gobé was born in Charleville, France and studied at the College Sainte-Jeanne D'Arc in Orléans and then at the Academy of Montpelier. He served in the 7th Infantry Regiment of the Navy in Fréjus from 1967 to 1971, before emigrating to Canada in 1972.

After serving as a sales manager and then head of Renault Canada, he was director of Ademco and then of Comterm. He was managing director of Norma Rental from 1980 to 1985.

== Political career ==
Gobé ran in the 1985 Quebec provincial election for the seat of LaFontaine against former Parti Québécois minister Marcel Léger and won with a narrow majority as Robert Bourassa became Premier for the second time. He served as a backbench supporter in the government and was re-elected in 1989. He served as a parliamentary secretary in the short-lived government of Daniel Johnson Jr.

He was reelected in 1994 and 1998, never facing a serious challenge. On February 20, 2005, Gobé quit the Quebec Liberal party after Leader Jean Charest requested he step aside for Tony Tomassi. He subsequently did not seek re-election in 2003.

After some time working at Iris as the Vice President of Business Development, he ran for the Liberal Party of Canada federally in 2004 in the riding of La Pointe-de-l'Île and then in 2006 in the riding of Alfred-Pellan, finishing a distant second both times. He then became an advisor to the ADQ leader Gérard Deltell and the head of the ADQ riding association in LaFontaine until the party folded.

In February 2013, Gobé founded the Action Laval party. He ran for mayor of Laval and lost to Marc Demers.

== Electoral record ==
=== Federal ===
2006 Canadian federal election: Alfred-Pellan
Party	Candidate	Votes	%	±%	Expenditures
Bloc Québécois	Robert Carrier	23,193	42.97	-6.23	$40,539
Liberal	Jean-Claude Gobé	14,895	27.59	-12.00	$78,159
Conservative	Rosanne Raymond	10,210	18.92	+13.85	$16,233
New Democratic	Martin Leduc	3,838	7.11	+3.64	$4,371
Green	Christien Lajoie	1,842	3.41	+1.29	
Total valid votes/expense limit		53,978	100.00	$80,448	
Total rejected ballots		791	1.44		
Turnout		54,769	68.18	+2.13	
Electors on the list		80,328			

2004 Canadian federal election: La Pointe-de-l'Île
Party	Candidate	Votes	%	±%	Expenditures
Bloc Québécois	Francine Lalonde	30,713	66.47	+13.35	$58,592
Liberal	Jean-Claude Gobé	10,593	22.93	−9.79	$62,081
Conservative	Christian Prévost	1,961	4.24	−3.11	$5,476
New Democratic	André Langevin	1,751	3.79	+2.69	none listed
Green	André Levert	1,186	2.57	–	none listed
Total valid votes		46,204	100.00		
Total rejected ballots		1,075			
Turnout		47,279	59.18		
Electors on the lists		79,894			
Sources: Official Results, Elections Canada and Financial Returns, Elections Canada.

=== Provincial ===
1998 Quebec general election: LaFontaine
Party	Candidate	Votes	%	±%
Liberal	Jean-Claude Gobé	22,984	57.59	+1.92
Parti Québécois	Pierre Séwa Adjeté	12,116	30.36	-4.23
Action démocratique	Réal Barrette	4,476	11.21	+3.22
Innovator	Renée Devirieux	176	0.44	-0.46
Socialist Democracy	Pierre-Yves Legault	161	0.40	–
Total valid votes		39,913	99.10	–
Total rejected ballots		362	0.90	–
Turnout		40,275	80.06	-2.81
Electors on the lists		50,305		
Liberal hold		Swing		+3.08

1994 Quebec general election: LaFontaine
Party	Candidate	Votes	%	±%
Liberal	Jean-Claude Gobé	20,698	55.67	-2.67
Parti Québécois	Anna-Laura Javicoli	12,116	30.36	-5.75
Action démocratique	Robert Fauteux	2,971	7.99	–
Innovator	Pierre Bourgault	334	0.90	-0.81
Natural Law	Pierre-Yves Legault	316	0.85	–
Total valid votes		37,181	98.56	–
Total rejected ballots		542	1.44	-1.36
Turnout		37,723	82.87	+12.07
Electors on the lists		45,521		
Liberal hold		Swing		+4.21

1989 Quebec general election: LaFontaine
Party	Candidate	Votes	%	±%
Liberal	Jean-Claude Gobé	15,328	57.83	+7.37
Parti Québécois	Anna-Laura Javicoli	9,571	36.11	-9.57
New Democratic	Destin Jean-Pierre	763	2.88	+1.31
Innovator	Michel Labrèche	452	1.71	–
Parti 51	Roger Wistaff	391	1.48	–
Total valid votes		26,505	97.20	–
Total rejected ballots		764	2.80	+0.90
Turnout		27,269	70.80	-5.67
Electors on the lists		38,516		
Liberal hold		Swing		+8.47

1985 Quebec general election: LaFontaine
Party	Candidate	Votes	%	±%
Liberal	Jean-Claude Gobé	19,577	50.46	+14.83
Parti Québécois	Marcel Léger	17,722	45.68	-16.40
New Democratic	Roger Vincent	608	1.57	–
Progressive Conservative	Jean-Paul Jacques	460	1.18	–
Union Nationale	Serge Léveillé	348	0.90	-0.98
Christian Socialist	Jean-Pierre Poulin	83	0.21	–
Total valid votes		26,505	98.10	–
Total rejected ballots		753	1.90	+0.57
Turnout		39,551	76.47	-7.38
Electors on the lists		51,720		
Liberal gain from Parti Québécois		Swing		+15.62

=== Municipal ===
Laval mayoral election, 2017
Party	Mayoral candidate	Vote	%
Mouvement lavallois - Équipe Marc Demers	Marc Demers (X)	50,805	46.24
Parti Laval - Équipe Michel Trottier	Michel Trottier	22,417	20.40
Action Laval - Équipe Jean Claude Gobé	Jean Claude Gobé	17,624	16.04
Avenir Laval - Équipe Sonia Baudelot	Sonia Baudelot	17,155	15.61
Alliance des conseillers autonomes - Équipe Alain Lecompte et Cynthia Leblanc	Alain Lecompte	763	0.69
Independent	Hélène Goupil	733	0.67
Independent	Nicolas Lemire	375	0.34
Total valid votes		109,872	36.32

Laval mayoral election, 2013
Party	Mayoral candidate	Vote	%
Mouvement lavallois	Marc Demers	51,151	44.19
Action Laval	Jean-Claude Gobé	28,130	24.30
Option Laval	Claire Le Bel	14,356	12.40
Parti au service du citoyen	Robert Bordeleau	12,574	10.86
Independent	Jacques Foucher	3,678	3.18
Independent	Hélène Goupil Nantel	2,361	2.04
Nouveau Parti des Lavallois	Guy Landry	1,453	1.26
Independent	Marc-Aurèle Racicot	1,451	1.25
Independent	Régent Millette	611	0.53
Total valid votes		115,765	100
