= Tony Tomassi =

Canadian politician (born 1971)

Minister of Families
- In office December 18, 2008 – May 5, 2010
- Preceded by: Michelle Courchesne
- Succeeded by: Yolande James

Member of the National Assembly of Quebec for LaFontaine
- In office May 1, 2003 – May 3, 2012
- Preceded by: Jean-Claude Gobé
- Succeeded by: Marc Tanguay

Personal details
- Born: January 15, 1971 (age 55) Montreal, Quebec, Canada
- Party: Independent (2010–present)
- Other political affiliations: Provincial: Liberal (2003–2010); Federal: Progressive Conservative (1993)
- Spouse: Clementina Teti-Tomassi

Tony Tomassi (born January 15, 1971) is a Quebec politician. He is the former Member of National Assembly of Quebec for the riding of LaFontaine in Montreal. He formerly represented the Quebec Liberal Party and was the Minister of Families, but was an independent until May 3, 2012, date of his resignation.

Tomassi studied at the Université du Québec à Montréal and the Université de Montréal but did not receive a university degree. He was a political aide for Liberal members for Bourget and Jeanne-Mance. He later became a general manager at Group Genco. He was also a member of the Montreal Board of Trade.

Tomassi was a candidate for the Progressive Conservative Party of Canada in Saint-Léonard—Saint-Michel, in the 1993 federal elections but was not elected as the Conservatives were reduced to just two seats in the House of Commons. He would run in provincial politics and was elected in 2003 in LaFontaine as a Liberal. He was re-elected in 2007 and named the parliamentary secretary to Premier Jean Charest. Following the 2008 elections, he was named for the first time in the Cabinet being designated as the Minister for Family replacing Michelle Courchesne who kept the portfolios of Education, Recreation and Sport.

On May 6, 2010, after much controversy around the attribution of publicly subsidized daycare licenses, Tony Tomassi was asked to resign as Minister for Family and to leave the Liberal caucus, after it was revealed he was using a business credit card in the name of Canadian Bureau of Investigations and Adjustments while sitting as an MNA. His portfolio was given to Yolande James.

On May 3, 2012, he resigned his seat in the Quebec National Assembly. In a brief statement, Tomassi, said he had represented the east-end Montreal LaFontaine riding "with pride." "And I recognize the confidence they showed in me on three occasions since 2003," he wrote. "In the circumstances, I tried to remain an MNA present in my riding, accessible and listening to citizens."

In October 2013, his name came up again in the Charbonneau Commission when François Crête, former chief of staff for then-environment minister Line Beauchamp, told the Charbonneau Commission that Tomassi had been lobbying for company called Carboneutre which was run by Domenic Arcuri, who has ties to the Rizzuto clan, and mob enforcer Raynald Desjardins. While the two men were seeking funds from the investment arm of Quebec's largest labour movement, Tomassi, then Minister for Family, was lobbying environment minister Beauchamp to grant the company a permit to decontaminate soil.

He is married to Clementina Teti-Tomassi, a former Montreal City Councillor.

Political offices
Preceded by Michelle Courchesne	Minister of Families; 2008–2010	Succeeded by Yolande James
