= Léger (company) =

Canadian marketing company

Léger (known as Léger & Léger from 1986 to 1996 and Léger Marketing from 1996 to 2013) is a Canadian family-owned market research and analytics company. It has more than 600 employees in eight Canadian and US offices. The company was founded in 1986 by the father and son duo Marcel Léger, former environment minister of Quebec, and economist Jean-Marc Léger. It is now led solely by Jean-Marc Léger.

== History ==
The firm is headquartered in Montreal, with offices in Toronto, Quebec City, Edmonton, Calgary, Winnipeg, and Vancouver in Canada, and Tarrytown, New York, in the United States. To date, Léger has acquired 12 companies.

In 1995, Léger & Léger repositioned itself in marketing research and became Léger Marketing. In 2000, the polling firm announced the acquisition of Criterion Research Corporation of Toronto. It then expanded westward with the acquisition of Criterion (Edmonton) in 2005 and Claros Research (Calgary) in 2006.

In 2005, Léger conducted the first online surveys in Canada with its Leger Web division.

In 2007, Léger Marketing entered the American market by acquiring ARC Research, a Philadelphia-based firm.

In 2010, Jean-Marc Léger became founding president of WIN, a worldwide association of polling firms that includes 75 major independent research firms from 73 countries. After making several acquisitions to provide Léger Marketing with the technological innovations needed to raise the Quebec company to a world-class position, its founder Jean-Marc Léger feels ready to take the next step: Léger Marketing becomes Léger (Research – Strategy – Consulting) and expands its offer in strategic consulting and advanced statistical analysis.

In 2012, Léger became a majority shareholder in Agility Metrics, a Montreal-based company built around a cloud computing application for measuring customer experience. Agility Metrics later became Léger Metrics. In the same year, Léger – Recherche Stratégie Conseil announced that it had acquired Researchology, a Toronto-based marketing research firm specializing in pharmaceutical research. In 2013, Léger acquired Ifop North America (located in Toronto), with marketing research experience in the pharmaceutical and consumer goods sectors.

In 2014, Léger became a minority shareholder and strategic partner of imarklab, positioned as the Canadian leader in interactive marketing intelligence. By combining traditional marketing research efforts with neuroscience, the imarklab-Léger partnership facilitates better understanding and intervention on customer behaviour across multiple channels of commerce.

In 2018, Léger launched its Léger Analytiques division. In 2019, Leger completed the acquisition of Vancouver-based National Research Group (NRG), the largest company in Western Canada with offices in Vancouver, Calgary, and Winnipeg. In the same year, Legerweb becomes LEO (Léger Opinion), the largest Canadian online panel with over 400,000 panelists.

In 2020, Léger acquired SmartPoint Research; a Toronto-based market research firm specialized in the consumer and healthcare sectors. This strategic acquisition enabled Léger to increase the size of its Léger Opinion (LEO) panel, supplement its patient and healthcare professional panels, and broaden its healthcare research service offering.

In October 2021, Léger acquired Ressac, a digital performance agency based in Montreal and specializing in media strategy and branded content activation.

In November 2021, Léger acquired Insights West, a Vancouver-based market research and analytics firm. This was Leger’s second acquisition in less than a month after acquiring digital agency Ressac and its 12th acquisition in total.
