= LaFontaine =

Provincial electoral district in Quebec, Canada

Coordinates: 45.6622°N 73.5522°W

Quebec electoral district
- Location in Montreal

Provincial electoral district
- Legislature: National Assembly of Quebec
MNA
Marc Tanguay
Liberal
- District created: 1965
- First contested: 1966
- Last contested: 2026

Demographics
- Population (2001): 52,971
- Electors (2014): 41,609
- Area (km²): 28.0
- Pop. density (per km²): 1,891.8
- Census division: Montreal (part)
- Census subdivision: Montreal (part)

LaFontaine (French pronunciation: [lafɔ̃tɛn]) is a provincial electoral district in Montreal, Quebec, Canada, that elects members to the National Assembly of Quebec. It consists of the neighbourhood of Rivière-des-Prairies in the borough of Rivière-des-Prairies–Pointe-aux-Trembles.

It was created for the 1966 election from a part of Bourget electoral district.

In the change from the 2001 to the 2011 electoral map, its territory was unchanged. From 1992 to 2001, the riding also included the northern half of Pointe-aux-Trembles.

It was named after the First Prime Minister of the United Province of Canada, Louis-Hippolyte Lafontaine.

== Members of the Legislative Assembly / National Assembly ==
Legislature	Years	Member	Party
Riding created from Bourget
28th	1966–1970	Jean-Paul Beaudry	Union Nationale
29th	1970–1973	Marcel Léger	Parti Québécois
30th	1973–1976	Marcel Léger	Parti Québécois
31st	1976–1981	Marcel Léger	Parti Québécois
32nd	1981–1985	Marcel Léger	Parti Québécois
33rd	1985–1989	Jean-Claude Gobé	Liberal
34th	1989–1994	Jean-Claude Gobé	Liberal
35th	1994–1998	Jean-Claude Gobé	Liberal
36th	1998–2003	Jean-Claude Gobé	Liberal
36th	2003–2003	Jean-Claude Gobé	Independent
37th	2003–2007	Tony Tomassi	Liberal
38th	2007–2008	Tony Tomassi	Liberal
39th	2008–2010	Tony Tomassi	Liberal
39th	2010–2012	Tony Tomassi	Independent
39th	2012–2012	Marc Tanguay	Liberal
40th	2012–2014	Marc Tanguay	Liberal
41st	2014–2018	Marc Tanguay	Liberal
42nd	2018–2022	Marc Tanguay	Liberal
43rd	2022–2026	Marc Tanguay	Liberal
44th	2026–Present	Marc Tanguay	Liberal

== Election results ==
2026 Quebec general election
** Preliminary results — Not yet official **
Party	Candidate	Votes	%	±%
Liberal	Marc Tanguay	14,893	58.86	+7.19
Conservative	Andréanne Bareil	3,418	13.51	+0.37
Parti Québécois	Joyd Rolkins Daréus	2,654	10.49	+5.39
Québec solidaire	Kim Fontaine	2,448	9.67	+0.80
Coalition Avenir Québec	Guepsly Florvil	1,514	5.98	–14.03
Canadian	Giovanni Manfredi	220	0.87	N/A
Green	David Cox	156	0.62	–0.59
Total valid votes		25,303	98.27	–0.31
Total rejected ballots		446	1.73	+0.31
Turnout		25,749	60.41	–1.92
Electors on the lists		42,624		
Liberal hold		Swing		+3.41
Source: Élections Québec

2022 Quebec general election
Party	Candidate	Votes	%	±%
Liberal	Marc Tanguay	13,398	51.67	-7.13
Coalition Avenir Québec	Loredana Bacchi	5,189	20.01	-1.9
Conservative	Yassir Madih	3,406	13.14	+11.38
Québec solidaire	Anne B-Godbout	2,301	8.87	+0.02
Parti Québécois	Shawn Vermette-Tassoni	1,322	5.10	-3.25
Green	Quinn Brunet	313	1.21	–
Total valid votes		25,929	98.58	–
Total rejected ballots		374	1.42	–
Turnout		26,303	62.33	
Electors on the lists		42,199		

2018 Quebec general election
Party	Candidate	Votes	%	±%
Liberal	Marc Tanguay	14,491	58.8	-14.46
Coalition Avenir Québec	Loredana Bacchi	5,400	21.91	+11.14
Québec solidaire	David Touchette	2,181	8.85	+4.97
Parti Québécois	Claude Gauthier	2,057	8.35	-2.49
Conservative	Caleb Lavoie	434	1.76	–
Marxist–Leninist	Yves Le Seigle	80	0.32	+0.21
Total valid votes		24,643	98.04	
Total rejected ballots		493	1.96	
Turnout		25,136	59.03	-15.35
Eligible voters		42,584		
Liberal hold		Swing		-12.80
Source(s) "Rapport des résultats officiels du scrutin". Élections Québec.

2014 Quebec general election
Party	Candidate	Votes	%	±%
Liberal	Marc Tanguay	22,476	73.26	+14.12
Parti Québécois	Mathieu Pelletier	3,327	10.84	-5.87
Coalition Avenir Québec	Julie Di Battista Manseau	3,303	10.77	-5.06
Québec solidaire	Véronique Martineau	1,189	3.88	-0.44
Green	Benoit Drouin	233	0.76	-1.00
Option nationale	Geneviève Dao Phan	116	0.38	-0.49
Marxist–Leninist	Yves Le Seigle	34	0.11	–
Total valid votes		30,678	99.13	–
Total rejected ballots		269	0.87	–
Turnout		30,947	74.38	+3.07
Electors on the lists		41,609	–	–

2012 Quebec general election
Party	Candidate	Votes	%	±%
Liberal	Marc Tanguay	17,081	59.14	+5.22
Parti Québécois	Marc Boulerice	4,826	16.71	-0.30
Coalition Avenir Québec	Domenico Cavaliere	4,728	16.37	+0.68
Québec solidaire	Christine Filiatrault	1,248	4.32	-1.59
Green	Gaëtan Bérard	507	1.76	-1.26
Option nationale	Maxime St-Arnault	252	0.87	-0.71
Conservative	Patrice Raza	160	0.55	-0.71
Quebec Citizens' Union	Steven Hombrados	78	0.27	–
Total valid votes		28,880	98.88	–
Total rejected ballots		327	1.12	–
Turnout		29,207	71.31	+45.77
Electors on the lists		40,960	–	–

Quebec provincial by-election, June 11, 2012
Party	Candidate	Votes	%	±%
Liberal	Marc Tanguay	5,446	53.36	-16.40
Parti Québécois	Frédéric St-Jean	1,736	17.01	-2.10
Coalition Avenir Québec	Domenico Cavaliere	1,601	15.69	+9.19*
Québec solidaire	Sébastien Rivard	603	5.91	+4.00
Green	Gaëtan Bérard	308	3.02	+0.29
Option nationale	Paolo Zambito	161	1.58	–
Conservative	Patrice Raza	129	1.26	–
Independent	Marc-André Beauchesne	104	1.02	–
Parti nul	Renaud Blais	82	0.80	–
Équipe Autonomiste	Guy Boivin	36	0.45	–
Total valid votes		10,206	98.24	–
Total rejected ballots		183	1.76	–
Turnout		10,389	25.54	-25.62
Electors on the lists		40,679	–	–

* Result compared to Action démocratique

2008 Quebec general election
Party	Candidate	Votes	%	±%
Liberal	Tony Tomassi	14,021	69.76	+7.30
Parti Québécois	Luigi De Benedictis	3,840	19.11	+4.86
Action démocratique	Gaetano Giumento	1,306	6.50	-11.74
Green	Gaëtan Berard	549	2.73	-0.20
Québec solidaire	Natacha Larocque	383	1.91	-0.21
Total valid votes		20,099	98.73	–
Total rejected ballots		258	1.27	–
Turnout		20,357	51.16	-16.22
Electors on the lists		39,794	–	–

2007 Quebec general election
Party	Candidate	Votes	%	±%
Liberal	Tony Tomassi	16,281	62.46	-7.07
Action démocratique	Marie-Eve Campéano	4,755	18.24	+7.92
Parti Québécois	Guido Renzi	3,715	14.25	-4.66
Green	Jean-Christophe Mortreux	765	2.93	–
Québec solidaire	Victorien Pilote	552	2.12	–
Total valid votes		26,068	98.91	–
Total rejected ballots		287	1.09	–
Turnout		26,355	67.38	-3.44
Electors on the lists		39,114	–	–

2003 Quebec general election
Party	Candidate	Votes	%	±%
Liberal	Tony Tomassi	18,164	69.53	+11.94
Parti Québécois	Line Pelletier	4,939	18.91	-11.45
Action démocratique	Josée Anello	2,697	10.32	-0.89
Bloc Pot	Patrick Forcier	323	1.24	–
Total valid votes		26,123	98.68	–
Total rejected ballots		350	1.32	–
Turnout		26,473	70.82	-9.24
Electors on the lists		37,380	–	–

1998 Quebec general election
Party	Candidate	Votes	%	±%
Liberal	Jean-Claude Gobé	22,984	57.59	+1.92
Parti Québécois	Pierre Séwa Adjeté	12,116	30.36	-4.23
Action démocratique	Réal Barrette	4,476	11.21	+3.22
Innovator	Renée Devirieux	176	0.44	-0.46
Socialist Democracy	Pierre-Yves Legault	161	0.40	–
Total valid votes		39,913	99.10	–
Total rejected ballots		362	0.90	–
Turnout		40,275	80.06	-2.81
Electors on the lists		50,305		
Liberal hold		Swing		+3.08

1995 Quebec referendum
Side	Votes	%
Non	26,373	59.73
Oui	17,780	40.27

1994 Quebec general election
Party	Candidate	Votes	%	±%
Liberal	Jean-Claude Gobé	20,698	55.67	-2.67
Parti Québécois	Anna-Laura Javicoli	12,116	30.36	-5.75
Action démocratique	Robert Fauteux	2,971	7.99	–
Innovator	Pierre Bourgault	334	0.90	-0.81
Natural Law	Pierre-Yves Legault	316	0.85	–
Total valid votes		37,181	98.56	–
Total rejected ballots		542	1.44	-1.36
Turnout		37,723	82.87	+12.07
Electors on the lists		45,521		
Liberal hold		Swing		+4.21

1989 Quebec general election
Party	Candidate	Votes	%	±%
Liberal	Jean-Claude Gobé	15,328	57.83	+7.37
Parti Québécois	Anna-Laura Javicoli	9,571	36.11	-9.57
New Democratic	Destin Jean-Pierre	763	2.88	+1.31
Innovator	Michel Labrèche	452	1.71	–
Parti 51	Roger Wistaff	391	1.48	–
Total valid votes		26,505	97.20	–
Total rejected ballots		764	2.80	+0.90
Turnout		27,269	70.80	-5.67
Electors on the lists		38,516		
Liberal hold		Swing		+8.47

1985 Quebec general election
Party	Candidate	Votes	%	±%
Liberal	Jean-Claude Gobé	19,577	50.46	+14.83
Parti Québécois	Marcel Léger	17,722	45.68	-16.40
New Democratic	Roger Vincent	608	1.57	–
Progressive Conservative	Jean-Paul Jacques	460	1.18	–
Union Nationale	Serge Léveillé	348	0.90	-0.98
Christian Socialist	Jean-Pierre Poulin	83	0.21	–
Total valid votes		26,505	98.10	–
Total rejected ballots		753	1.90	+0.57
Turnout		39,551	76.47	-7.38
Electors on the lists		51,720		
Liberal gain from Parti Québécois		Swing		+15.62

== See also ==
- List of Quebec provincial electoral districts
- Canadian provincial electoral districts
