= Beau risque =

In Quebec politics, le beau risque (French pronunciation: [lə bo ʁisk], the noble risk or the good risk) is a political catch phrase describing the "risk" the Parti Québécois (PQ or "péquistes") took in asking Quebecers to support federal Progressive Conservatives (PCs or "Tories") under Brian Mulroney and accept an amended version of the Constitution Act, 1982, which the péquiste Quebec government under René Lévesque had previously refused to sign. Mulroney promised Quebec the opportunity to fully enter into the constitution "with honour and enthusiasm" and have its distinctiveness recognized in the document.

== Etymology ==
It was coined by Parti Québécois Premier of Quebec René Lévesque. His taking the beau risque provoked a crisis in the party, as its main founding principle was the entry of Quebec into a different relationship with Canada, and a number of his party's Members of the National Assembly of Quebec left as a result.

== History ==
In the subsequent 1984 Canadian election the Progressive Conservatives took 58 out of 75 seats in Quebec. Mulroney attempted to fulfill his promise to Quebec via the Meech Lake Accord of 1987, a package of constitutional amendments including a "distinct society" clause for Quebec recognizing that province's unique status. In the 1988 Canadian election, fought around the issue of free-trade with the United States (which Mulroney supported), the PCs increased their total in Quebec to 63. All three major parties, at least publicly, supported the Meech Lake Accord.

Following the 1988 election, however, the Meech Lake Accord was attacked from a variety of ideological angles outside of Quebec, uniting forces as disparate as ex-prime minister Pierre Trudeau, the National Action Committee on the Status of Women, the Reform Party of Canada, and the Assembly of First Nations. It was blocked in the Manitoba legislature by First Nations MLA Elijah Harper and then finally failed when the legislature of Newfoundland cancelled its planned vote on the issue just before the 1990 deadline, signalling a rejection. It was replaced with the Charlottetown Accord of 1992, which had many similarities, but it was defeated in a national referendum.

With the failure of the accords, Mulroney was unable to achieve constitutional recognition of Quebec as a distinct society, and in the 1993 election the Conservatives won only a single seat in Quebec (and only one other in the rest of the country). The largest share of seats in Quebec went to the newly created Bloc Québécois, an openly sovereigntist party led by Lucien Bouchard, a former MP and cabinet minister in Mulroney's government.

== Legacy ==
In 2006, under the Conservative government of Stephen Harper, the Canadian House of Commons passed a motion recognizing "that the Québécois form a nation within a united Canada," but it was without constitutional force. In the subsequent election of 2008, the Conservatives won ten seats in Quebec, the same number as they had won in 2006. In the 2011 election, the Conservatives were reduced to five seats in the province. Though the Conservatives lost power in the 2015 election and remained in Opposition following the 2019 election and 2021 election, its seat count in Quebec went back up, winning 12, 10, and 10 seats in Quebec, respectively.

== See also ==
- History of Quebec
- Timeline of Quebec history
