= Option nationale candidates in the 2014 Quebec provincial election =

Option nationale (ON) fielded 116 candidates in the 2014 Quebec provincial election. It did not win any seats.

The party did not field candidates in Arthabaska, Blainville, D'Arcy-McGee, Jacques-Cartier, Jeanne-Mance–Viger, Mont-Royal, Notre-Dame-de-Grâce, Pontiac, or Westmount–Saint-Louis. Most of these ridings are bastions of Canadian federalism. Option nationale is a Quebec separatist party.

Riding	Candidate's Name	Residence	Occupation	Votes	%	Rank	Notes
Abitibi-Est	Richard Trudel			235	1.14	5th	
Abitibi-Ouest	Grégory Vézeau			627	2.86	5th	
Acadie	Julie Boivin			162	0.47	6th	
Anjou–Louis-Riel	Raphael Couture			147	0.47	6th	
Argenteuil	Samuel Cloutier			112	0.37	6th	
Beauce-Nord	Lorenzo Tessier-Moreau			105	0.34	7th	
Beauce-Sud	Vanessa Roy			220	0.65	6th	
Beauharnois	Florence Rousseau			183	0.60	7th	
Bellechasse	Mathilde Lefebvre			116	0.36	6th	
Berthier	Francis Lamarre			261	0.69	6th	
Berthier	Diane Massicotte			199	0.49	6th	
Bonaventure	Louis-Patrick St-Pierre			130	0.52	6th	
Borduas	Mark-Olivier Siouï			246	0.58	5th	
Bourassa-Sauvé	Félix Luthu			119	0.40	7th	
Bourget	Diego Saavedra Renaud			243	0.73	6th	
Brome-Missisquoi	Nicolas Pépin			199	0.49	5th	
Chambly	Martin Laramée			200	0.56	7th	
Champlain	Nicolas Lavigne-Lefebvre			222	0.64	5th	
Chapleau	Philippe Boily			256	0.75	6th	
Charlesbourg	Guillaume Cyr			257	0.64	7th	
Charlevoix–Côte-de-Beaupré	François Thériault			287	0.77	6th	
Châteauguay	Vincent Masse			199	0.55	5th	
Chauveau	Sophie Leblanc			289	0.67	6th	
Chicoutimi	Philippe Gosselin			327	1.00	6th	
Chomedey	Patrick Simard			130	0.31	7th	
Chutes-de-la-Chaudière	Alexis Lévesque-Morin			236	0.53	7th	
Côte-du-Sud	Joël Leblanc-Lavoie			158	0.45	7th	
Crémazie	Gabrielle Ladouceur-Despins			227	0.66	6th	
Deux-Montagnes	Louis-Félix Cauchon			233	0.67	6th	
Drummond–Bois-Francs	Alexandre Phénix			155	0.45	7th	
Dubuc	Ariane Belva			285	1.03	6th	
Duplessis	Yan Rivard			458	2.06	5th	
Fabre	Bernard Paré			181	0.48	5th	
Gaspé	Frédérick Deroy			194	1.01	6th	
Gatineau	Marcel Vaive			160	0.43	5th	
Gouin	Olivier Lacelle			358	1.13	5th	
Granby	Jocelyn Beaudoin			179	0.51	6th	
Groulx	Alain Marginean			384	0.93	6th	
Hochelaga-Maisonneuve	Simon Marchand			316	1.22	6th	
Hull	Eid Harb			189	0.57	5th	
Huntingdon	Yann Labrie			113	0.39	7th	
Iberville	Claude Savard			265	0.81	5th	
Îles-de-la-Madeleine	David Boudreau			46	0.56	5th	
Jean-Lesage	Sol Zanetti			782	2.50	5th	Party leader.
Jean-Talon	Alexandre Lavallée			526	1.51	5th	
Johnson	Magali Doucet			304	0.80	6th	
Joliette	Sylvain Legault			510	1.29	5th	
Jonquière	Nicolas Beaulieu			326	1.05	5th	
L'Assomption	Gabriel Gauthier			226	0.60	5th	
La Peltrie	Éric Belleau			274	0.64	6th	
La Pinière	François Létourneau-Prézeau			534	1.20	5th	
La Prairie	Jean-Paul Gouin			162	0.50	6th	
Labelle	Philippe Richard-Léonard			211	0.69	5th	
Lac-Saint-Jean	Sabrina Fauteux-Aïmola			222	0.75	7th	
LaFontaine	Geneviève Dao Phan			116	0.38	6th	
Laporte	Linda Dupuis			182	0.55	6th	
Laurier-Dorion	Miguel Tremblay			263	0.78	6th	
Laval-des-Rapides	David Voyer			188	0.49	6th	
Laviolette	Gabriel-Olivier Clavet-Massicotte			124	0.52	5th	
Lévis	Nicolas Belley			252	0.72	6th	
Lotbinière-Frontenac	Annie Grégoire-Gauthier			193	0.49	6th	
Louis-Hébert	Patrick Côté			266	0.71	6th	
Marguerite-Bourgeoys	Myriam Drouin			177	0.47	6th	
Marie-Victorin	Fabien Villemaire			244	0.80	6th	
Marquette	Maude Paquette			151	0.46	8th	
Maskinongé	Dany Brien			154	0.44	6th	
Masson	Pierre-Alexandre Bugeaud			289	0.84	5th	
Matane-Matapédia	Joëlle Vadeboncoeur Harrison			207	0.70	5th	
Mégantic	Évelyne Beaudin			236	0.89	5th	
Mercier	Martin Servant			228	0.80	5th	
Mille-Îles	Maël Rieussec			84	0.26	7th	
Mirabel	Curtis Jean-Louis			200	0.48	6th	
Montarville	Anthony van Duyse			301	0.70	5th	
Montmorency	Jean Bouchard			255	0.60	7th	
Nelligan	François Landry			245	0.54	5th	
Nicolet-Bécancour	Marjolaine Lachapelle			638	2.21	5th	
Orford	Denis Spick			273	0.92	5th	
Outremont	Galia Vaillancourt			154	0.56	7th	Vaillancourt had previously sought election to the Montreal city council in the 2013 municipal election, running for Coalition Montréal in Mile End.
Papineau	Jonathan Beauchamp			309	0.85	6th	
Pointe-aux-Trembles	Camille Goyette-Gingras			234	0.84	6th	
Portneuf	Stéphanie Grimard			227	0.74	6th	
René-Lévesque	Nicolas Boivin Ringuette			207	1.03	5th	
Repentigny	Christian Strasbourg			260	0.68	5th	
Richelieu	Jean-François Tremblay			403	1.34	5th	
Richmond	Vincent Proulx			236	0.57	6th	
Rimouski	Pierre Beaudoin			327	1.10	5th	
Rivière-du-Loup–Témiscouata	Étienne Massé			245	0.70	6th	
Robert-Baldwin	Viviane Martinova-Croteau			96	0.23	7th	
Roberval	Luc-Antoine Cauchon			218	0.68	6th	
Rosemont	Sophie-Geneviève Labelle			321	0.87	6th	
Rosseau	Chantal St-Onge			362	0.91	5th	
Rouyn-Noranda–Témiscamingue	Ghislain Dallaire			269	0.96	5th	
Saint-François	Étienne Boudou-Laforce			265	0.69	7th	
Saint-Henri–Sainte-Anne	Étienne Forest			225	0.60	7th	
Saint-Hyacinthe	Éric Pothier			374	0.92	5th	
Saint-Jean	Jade Bossé Bélanger			386	0.93	5th	
Saint-Jérôme	Mathieu Trottier-Kavanagh			200	0.54	5th	
Saint-Laurent	Jennifer Beaudry			236	0.62	6th	
Saint-Maurice	Jean Guillemette			152	0.62	6th	
Sainte-Marie–Saint-Jacques	Nic Payne			210	0.76	6th	
Sainte-Rose	Bruno Forget			269	0.69	5th	
Sanguinet	Robert Moreau			271	0.94	5th	
Sherbrooke	Jean-Simon Campbell			321	0.94	6th	
Soulanges	Patrick Marquis			478	1.37	5th	
Taillon	Éric Gervais-Després			320	0.89	5th	
Taschereau	Catherine Dorion			1,513	4.21	5th	
Terrebonne	Jean-François Jacob			411	1.03	5th	
Trois-Rivières	André de Repentigny			238	0.80	6th	
Ungava	Zoé Allen-Mercier			235	2.16	5th	
Vachon	Josée Létourneau			280	0.77	6th	
Vanier-Les Rivières	Mathieu Fillion			400	0.95	6th	
Vaudreuil	Jean-Gabriel Cauchon			115	0.25	8th	
Verchères	Mathieu Coulombe			450	1.04	5th	
Verdun	Julien Longchamp			160	0.47	6th	
Viau	Benjamin Michaud			177	0.69	7th	
Vimont	Étienne Boily			192	0.55	6th	
