= 2018 Quebec general election =

Canadian provincial election

- October 1, 2018

125 seats in the National Assembly of Quebec 63 seats needed for a majority
- Opinion polls
- Turnout: 66.45% (▼4.98%)
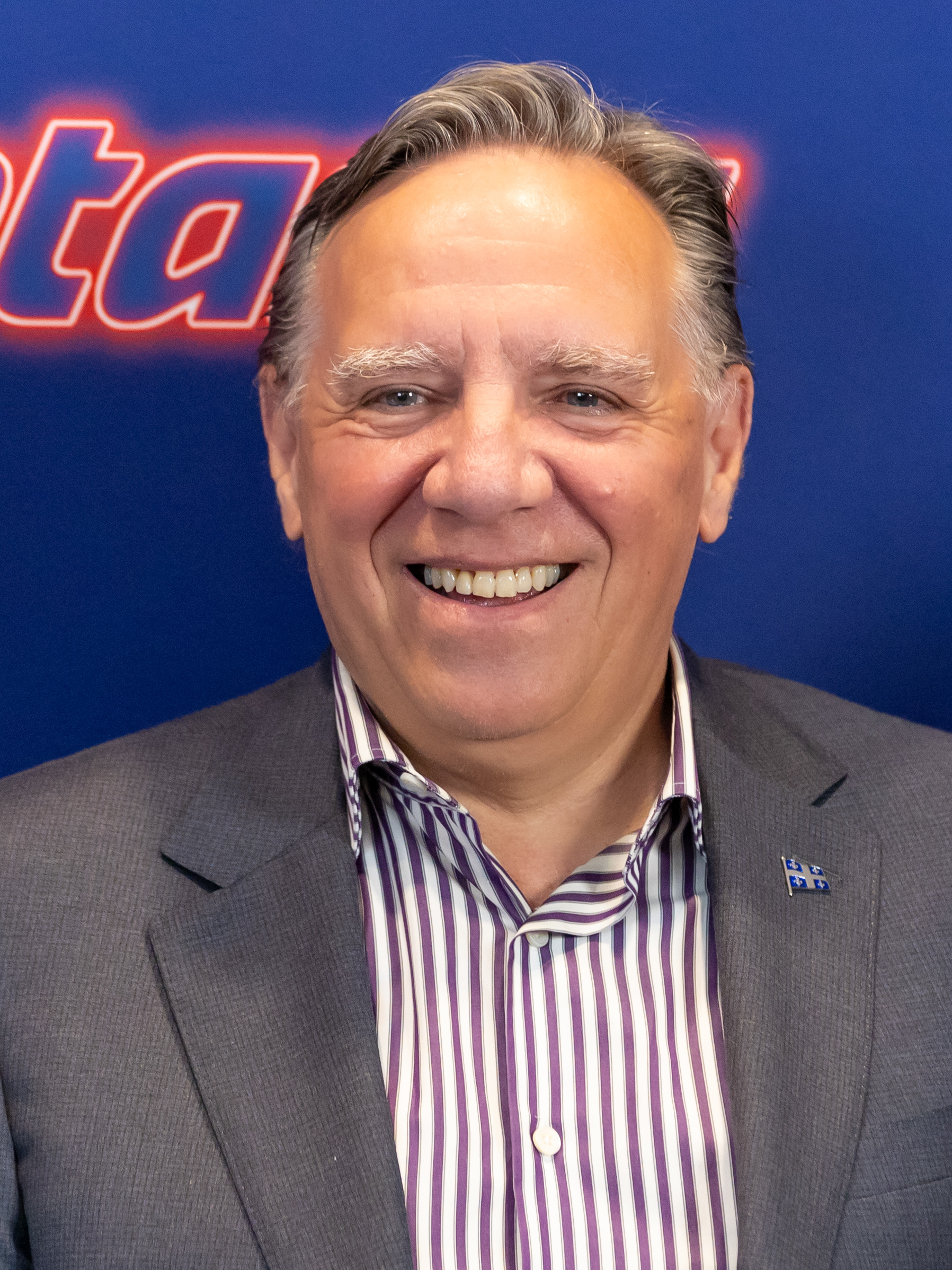

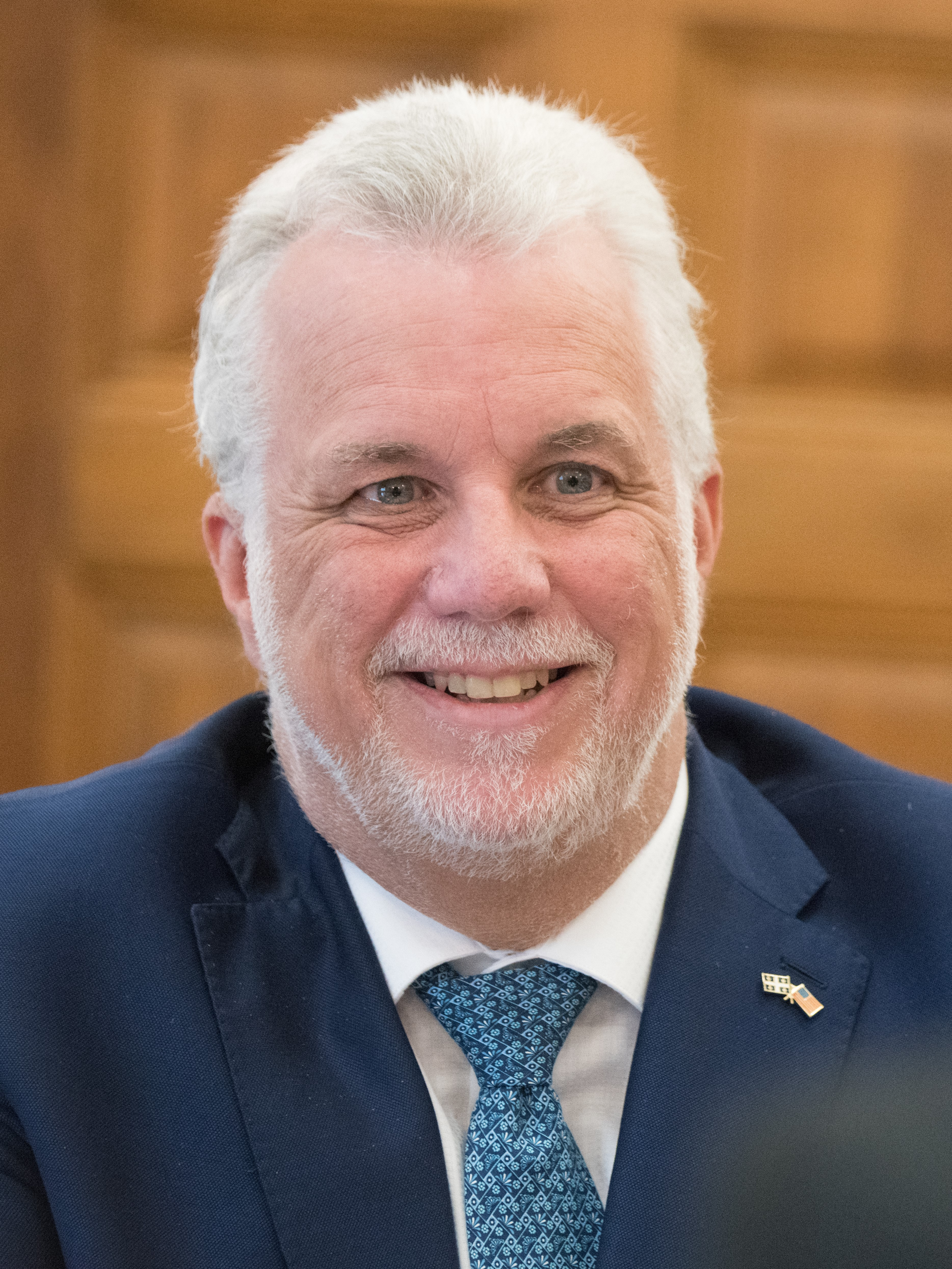

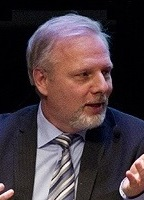

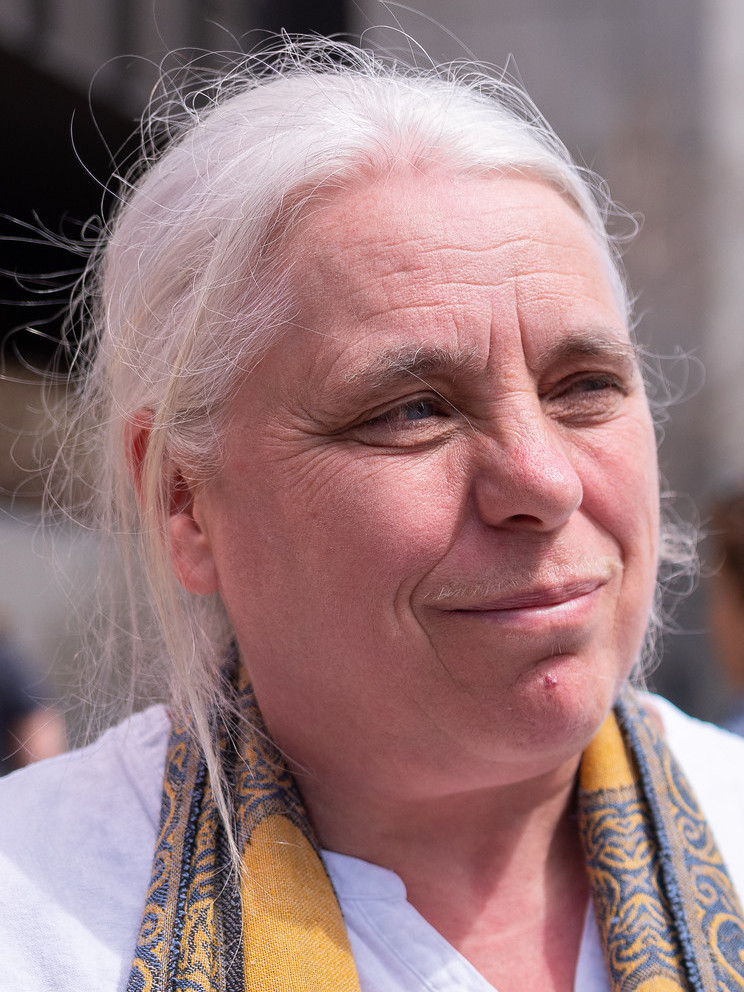
	Majority party	Minority party
Leader	François Legault	Philippe Couillard
Party	Coalition Avenir Québec	Liberal
Leader since	November 4, 2011	March 17, 2013
Leader's seat	L'Assomption	Roberval
Last election	22 seats, 23.05%	70 seats, 41.52%
Seats before	21	68
Seats won	74	31
Seat change	▲53	▼37
Popular vote	1,509,455	1,001,037
Percentage	37.42%	24.82%
Swing	▲14.37pp	▼16.70pp
	Third party	Fourth party
Leader	Jean-François Lisée	Manon Massé (Note: Québec solidaire designated Massé as its candidate for Premier, and Massé and Gabriel Nadeau-Dubois as co-spokespeople. The party's power is held by the general meetings of the members and a board of 16 directors; the de jure leader recognized by the Chief Electoral Officer of Quebec (DGE) is Gaétan Châteauneuf.)
Party	Parti Québécois	Québec solidaire
Leader since	October 7, 2016	May 21, 2017
Leader's seat	Rosemont (lost re-election)	Sainte-Marie–Saint-Jacques
Last election	30 seats, 25.38%	3 seats, 7.63%
Seats before	28	3
Seats won	10	10
Seat change	▼18	▲7
Popular vote	687,995	649,503
Percentage	17.06%	16.10%
Swing	▼8.32pp	▲8.47pp
- Popular vote by riding. As this is an FPTP election, seat totals are not determined by popular vote, but instead by the result in each riding. Riding names are listed at the bottom.
Premier before election
Philippe Couillard
Liberal
Premier after election
François Legault
Coalition Avenir Québec

The 2018 Quebec general election was held on October 1, 2018, to elect members to the National Assembly of Quebec. The election saw a landslide victory for the Coalition Avenir Québec (CAQ) led by François Legault, which won 74 of 125 seats, giving the party a majority and unseating the Quebec Liberal Party. The Liberals became the official opposition with 31 seats.

This election was the first won by the CAQ, which had previously been the third party in the legislature. It was also the first since 1966 that had been won by a party other than the Liberals or Parti Québécois.

== Background ==
In Quebec the Liberal Party had held power since 2003, save for a period of less than two years between 2012 and 2014.

The National Assembly has had a fixed four-year term since passing a fixed election date law in 2013. The law stipulates that "the general election following the end of a Legislature shall be held on the first Monday of October of the fourth calendar year following the year that includes the last day of the previous Legislature", setting the date for October 1, 2018. However, the Chief Electoral Officer could have changed the election date in the event of a natural disaster. Furthermore, the Lieutenant Governor could have called an election sooner should the Premier have requested one, or in the event the government had been dissolved by a motion of no confidence.

== Redistribution of ridings ==
The Commission de la représentation électorale performed a redistribution in 2017, which maintained the number of seats in the National Assembly at 125 for the next general election, making the following alterations:

Abolished ridings	New ridings
Renaming of districts
Crémazie	Maurice-Richard
Drawn from other districts
	Prévost (Note: From parts of Bertrand and Rousseau)
	Les Plaines (Note: From parts of Mirabel, Blainville and Masson)
Merger of districts
Laviolette; Saint-Maurice	Laviolette–Saint-Maurice
Mont-Royal; Outremont	Mont-Royal–Outremont

== Timeline ==
=== Party standings ===
Summary of the pre-election standings of the National Assembly of Quebec
Party	Party leader	Seats	
Party	Party leader	2014	Dissolution
Liberal	Philippe Couillard	70	68
Parti Québécois	Jean-François Lisée	30	28
Coalition Avenir Québec	François Legault	22	21
Québec solidaire	Manon Massé	3	3
Independent		0	5
Vacant			0
Total		125	125

=== Seat changes (2014–2017) ===
Results by riding of the 15 by-elections to the National Assembly of Quebec during the 41st Legislature (2014–2018)

41st National Assembly of Quebec - Movement in seats held from 2014 to 2018
Party	Leader	2014	Gain/(loss) due to							2018
Party	Leader	2014	Resignation	Resigned from party	Death in office	Withdrawn from caucus	Expulsion	By-election hold	By-election gain	2018
Liberal	Philippe Couillard	70	(6)			(1)	(2)	5	1	67
Parti Québécois	Jean-François Lisée	30	(5)	(1)			(1)	5		28
Coalition Avenir Québec	François Legault	22	(2)	(1)			(1)	1	2	21
Québec solidaire	Manon Massé	3	(1)					1		3
Independent	—N/a	–		2	(1)	1	4			6
Total		125	(14)	–	(1)	–	–	12	3	125

Changes in seats held (2014–2018)
Seat	Before				Change		
Seat	Date	Member	Party	Reason	Date	Member	Party
Lévis	August 15, 2014	Christian Dubé	█ CAQ	Resignation	October 20, 2014	François Paradis	█ CAQ
Richelieu	September 29, 2014	Élaine Zakaïb	█ Parti Québécois	Resignation	March 9, 2015	Sylvain Rochon	█ Parti Québécois
Jean-Talon	February 26, 2015	Yves Bolduc	█ Liberal	Resignation (Note: also from the position of Minister of Education)	June 8, 2015	Sébastien Proulx	█ Liberal
Chauveau	April 7, 2015	Gérard Deltell	█ CAQ	Resignation (Note: to run for the Conservatives in Louis-Saint-Laurent)	June 8, 2015	Véronyque Tremblay	█ Liberal
Saint-Henri–Sainte-Anne	August 21, 2015	Marguerite Blais	█ Liberal	Resignation	November 9, 2015	Dominique Anglade	█ Liberal
Fabre	August 24, 2015	Gilles Ouimet	█ Liberal	Resignation	November 9, 2015	Monique Sauvé	█ Liberal
Arthabaska	August 26, 2015	Sylvie Roy	█ CAQ	Resigned from party			█ Independent
René-Lévesque	September 3, 2015	Marjolain Dufour	█ Parti Québécois	Resignation	November 9, 2015	Martin Ouellet	█ Parti Québécois
Beauce-Sud	September 22, 2015	Robert Dutil	█ Liberal	Resignation	November 9, 2015	Paul Busque	█ Liberal
Chicoutimi	October 22, 2015	Stéphane Bédard	█ Parti Québécois	Resignation	April 11, 2016	Mireille Jean	█ Parti Québécois
Saint-Jérôme	May 2, 2016	Pierre Karl Péladeau	█ Parti Québécois	Resignation (Note: also from the positions of PQ leader and Leader of the Opposition)	December 5, 2016	Marc Bourcier	█ Parti Québécois
Marie-Victorin	June 13, 2016	Bernard Drainville	█ Parti Québécois	Resignation (Note: also from the position of Opposition House Leader)	December 5, 2016	Catherine Fournier	█ Parti Québécois
Arthabaska	July 31, 2016	Sylvie Roy	█ Independent	Died in office	December 5, 2016	Éric Lefebvre	█ CAQ
Verdun	August 19, 2016	Jacques Daoust	█ Liberal	Resignation (Note: also from the position of Minister of Transport, Sustainable Mobility and Transport Electrification)	December 5, 2016	Isabelle Melançon	█ Liberal
Laurier-Dorion	October 20, 2016	Gerry Sklavounos	█ Liberal	Expulsion			█ Independent
Gouin	January 19, 2017	Françoise David	█ QC solidaire	Resignation	May 29, 2017	Gabriel Nadeau-Dubois	█ QC solidaire
Groulx	January 25, 2017	Claude Surprenant	█ CAQ	Expulsion			█ Independent
Brome-Missisquoi	January 27, 2017	Pierre Paradis	█ Liberal	Expulsion			█ Independent
Vachon	February 5, 2017	Martine Ouellet	█ Parti Québécois	Resigned from party (Note: to seek the Bloc Québécois leadership)			█ Independent
Louis-Hébert	April 27, 2017	Sam Hamad	█ Liberal	Resignation	October 2, 2017	Geneviève Guilbault	█ CAQ
Gaspé	May 16, 2017	Gaétan Lelièvre	█ Parti Québécois	Expulsion			█ Independent
Argenteuil	April 17, 2018	Yves St-Denis	█ Liberal	Withdraws from caucus			█ Independent

=== Other developments ===
Date	Event
April 7, 2014	The Quebec Liberal Party wins a majority government in the 41st Quebec general election, and Philippe Couillard becomes Quebec's Premier-designate. Outgoing Premier Pauline Marois announces her resignation as Parti Québécois leader.
April 10, 2014	The Parti Québécois caucus unanimously approves Stéphane Bédard as interim leader.
October 4, 2014	PQ riding association presidents meet to decide rules and timeline for its leadership race.
May 15, 2015	Pierre Karl Péladeau is elected leader of the Parti Québécois.
May 6, 2016	Sylvain Gaudreault is appointed interim PQ leader.
October 7, 2016	Jean-François Lisée is elected leader of the Parti Québécois.
March 24, 2017	Québec solidaire announces that its party members will vote on a proposition at its party convention in May to begin talks to merge with Option nationale.
May 21, 2017	Manon Massé and Gabriel Nadeau-Dubois are elected as co-spokespersons for Québec solidaire.
October 5, 2017	Executives of QS and ON reach an agreement to propose a merger, which has yet to be approved by members/delegates in two special congresses.
October 26, 2017	Guy Ouellette, MNA for Chomedey, withdraws from the caucus of the Liberal Party. He rejoins the caucus on November 21.
December 10, 2017	ON and QS decide to merge: ON's special congress approves merger at 90%, 8 days after QS's special congress approved it at 80%.
May 10, 2018	Paul Busque, MNA for Beauce-Sud, withdraws from the caucus of the Liberal Party during an investigation by the ethics commissioner. On June 15, 2018, he is readmitted into the caucus.
August 23, 2018	Phillippe Couillard goes to see the Lieutenant-Governor and calls the election for October 1, 2018.
August 29, 2018	The 41st Legislature ends.
September 13, 2018	First televised debate (Radio-Canada).
September 15, 2018	Candidate nominations close.
September 17, 2018	Second televised debate (CTV). English debate.
September 20, 2018	Third televised debate (TVA).

== Incumbents not running for reelection ==
As of September 5, 2018, a total of 45 MNAs elected in 2014 will not run in the 2018 election, of whom 12 resigned from the National Assembly, one died in office and 32 announced that they will not seek re-election including one whose riding was dissolved, and one who got fired. The latter comprise the following:

Electoral District	Incumbent at dissolution and subsequent nominee		New MNA
Abitibi-Ouest	François Gendron	Sylvain Vachon	Suzanne Blais
Beauce-Nord	André Spénard	Luc Provençal	Luc Provençal
Beauharnois	Guy Leclair	Mireille Théorêt	Claude Reid
Bertrand	Claude Cousineau	Gilbert Lafrenière	Nadine Girault
Bourassa-Sauvé	Rita de Santis	Paule Robitaille	Paule Robitaille
Brome-Missisquoi	Pierre Paradis	Ingrid Marini	Isabelle Charest
Côte-du-Sud	Norbert Morin	Simon Laboissonnière	Marie-Eve Proulx
Gaspé	Gaétan Lelièvre	–	Méganne Perry-Mélançon
Gatineau	Stéphanie Vallée	Luce Farrell	Robert Bussière
Groulx	Claude Surprenant	Eric Girard	Eric Girard
Îles-de-la-Madeleine	Germain Chevarie	Maryse Lapierre	Joël Arseneau
Jacques-Cartier	Geoffrey Kelley	Greg Kelley	Greg Kelley
Jean-Lesage	André Drolet	Gertrude Bourdon	Sol Zanetti
Lac-Saint-Jean	Alexandre Cloutier	William Fradette	Éric Girard
Laurier-Dorion	Gerry Sklavounos	–	Andrés Fontecilla
Lotbinière-Frontenac	Laurent Lessard	Pierre-Luc Daigle	Isabelle Lecours
Marguerite-Bourgeoys	Robert Poëti	Hélène David	Hélène David
Marquette	François Ouimet	Enrico Ciccone	Enrico Ciccone
Mégantic	Ghislain Bolduc	Robert G. Roy	François Jacques
Mercier	Amir Khadir	Ruba Ghazal	Ruba Ghazal
Montmorency	Raymond Bernier	Marie France Trudel	Jean-François Simard
Nelligan	Martin Coiteux	Monsef Derraji	Monsef Derraji
Orford	Pierre Reid	Guy Madore	Gilles Bélanger
Pointe-aux-Trembles	Nicole Léger	Jean-Martin Aussant	Chantal Rouleau
Portneuf	Michel Matte	Philippe Gasse	Vincent Caron
Richmond	Karine Vallières	Annie Godbout	André Bachand
Saint-François	Guy Hardy	Charles Poulin	Geneviève Hébert
Saint-Laurent	Jean-Marc Fournier	Marwah Rizqy	Marwah Rizqy
Taschereau	Agnès Maltais	Diane Lavallée	Catherine Dorion
Vachon	Martine Ouellet	–	Ian Lafrenière
Viau	David Heurtel	Frantz Benjamin	Frantz Benjamin
Westmount–Saint-Louis	Jacques Chagnon	Jennifer Maccarone	Jennifer Maccarone

At the end of his term, Gendron, Dean of the National Assembly, will have served for 41 years and 10 months, representing Abitibi-Ouest for 11 terms.

== Campaign ==
The election saw the first ever English language debate between the leaders of Coalition Avenir Québec (CAQ), Parti Québécois (PQ), Québec solidaire and the Quebec Liberal Party. As of 2026 these the most recent English language debates in a Quebec election.

=== Contests ===
Candidate contests in the ridings
Candidates nominated	Ridings	Party																
Candidates nominated	Ridings	CAQ	PQ	PLQ	QS	PCQ	Green	NDP	CPQ	BP	MLP	Ind	Nul	Auto	Libre	CINQ	Oth	Totals
4	2	2	2	2	2													8
5	4	4	4	4	4	3		1										20
6	24	24	24	24	24	15	12	4	10	1	2		1	2	1			144
7	40	40	40	40	40	32	33	15	15	7	5	3	3	2	2		3	280
8	22	22	22	22	22	22	20	11	10	7	6	5	1	1	1	2	2	176
9	22	22	22	22	22	19	21	19	15	6	6	9	5	3	3	2	2	198
10	8	8	8	8	8	8	8	6	3	6	4	2	3	3	1	3	1	80
11	2	2	2	2	2	1	2	2	2	1	1	2	2	1				22
12	1	1	1	1	1	1	1	1	1	1	1		1				1	12
Total	125	125	125	125	125	101	97	59	56	29	25	21	16	12	8	7	9	940

=== Slogans ===
Parties	French	English	Refs
█ Liberal	Pour faciliter la vie des Québécois	"To facilitate the lives of Quebecers" "To make life easier for Quebecers"	
█ Parti Québécois	Sérieusement.	"Seriously."	
█ CAQ	Maintenant.	"Now."	
█ QC solidaire	Populaires.	"Popular."	
█ Green	Bien plus qu'une couleur.	"More than just a colour."	
█ Conservative	Je vote conservateur.	"I vote conservative."	

=== Issues ===
The election was believed to be the first in almost half a century that had not been fought on the issue of whether Quebec should stay in Canada. The PQ had promised not to hold another referendum on sovereignty until 2022 at the earliest had it won.

2018 Quebec election – issues and respective party platforms
Issue	QLP	PQ	CAQ	QS
Economy and Public Finance	Have tabled five budgets since taking power in 2014; four of them have been balanced. The 2018 budget increased spending by 4.7 per cent, one of the highest increases in the past 20 years.; Plan to spend $440 million over the next five years encouraging entrepreneurship in the province.	Advocates economic nationalism. They want Quebec's pension fund manager — the Caisse de dépôt et placement du Québec — to help prevent corporate headquarters from leaving the province.; The party would also impose a 25 per cent-Quebec content requirement on all Caisse infrastructure projects.; Wants to limit the amount you can save on books, to protect small businesses.	CAQ Leader François Legault has promised to reduce the tax burden of Quebecers. A CAQ government, he says, will further harmonize school taxes across the province, a tax cut valued at $700 million.; A long-standing party proposal is to create a Quebec version of Silicon Valley, which they've dubbed "The Saint-Laurent Project". It envisions turning the Saint-Lawrence Valley into a hub of innovation and entrepreneurship, with the collaboration of universities.; Hoping to eliminate tens of thousands of jobs from the province's civil service.	Supports a $15/hour minimum wage, extending minimum vacation from two to four weeks and ending forced overtime.; The party platform mentions the possibility of nationalizing natural resources in the province, including the mining and forestry industries.; Will offer rebates on electric vehicles, and establish a ban on gas-powered vehicles by 2050.
Immigration	Endorsed a plan that will see Quebec accept between 49,000 and 53,000 immigrants in 2018.; Have promised to spend $25 million over the next four years to provide more French lessons for immigrants and help their integration in rural communities.	Believes 50,000 immigrants is too much for Quebec to accept each year. Lisée wants the auditor general to suggest a different figure.; Would ensure that 25 per cent of newcomers settle in rural communities.; The PQ also wants immigrants to have sufficient knowledge of French and Quebec values before arriving in the province. It is not clear if this would involve additional testing.	As premier, Legault says he would temporarily reduce the number of immigrants Quebec accepts annually from 50,000 to 40,000.; To qualify for a Quebec selection certificate, the CAQ wants immigrants to pass a values and language test. Immigrants would also have to prove they have been looking for employment.	Would create a network of resource centres for immigrants, in order to provide easier access to information about jobs and French lessons, among other things.; Has also promised to streamline the recognition of foreign credentials.
Health Care	The Couillard government passed two major health care reforms bills aimed at centralizing administration and boosting the number of people with a family doctor.; As part of the reforms, 1,400 health care managers were laid off. In 2013–2014, 65 per cent of Quebecers had a family doctor. That number rose to 75 per cent by 2016–2017.	Would reopen a recently signed agreement with province's medical specialists in order to cut their pay.	The party favours decentralizing health-care administration, while maintaining a universal free public health care system, Legault was quoted saying "The important thing is the universality of care. ... I do not want more private. Our public [health care] is a jewel of Quebec."; Like the PQ, the CAQ also vowed to renegotiate with the Quebec's medical specialists in order to cut their compensation by an average of $80,000 per year. Legault believes the specialists will be open to striking a new deal.; Would overhaul the province's longterm care system (CHSLDs) with a new network of smaller, more "humane" homes at an initial cost of $1 billion.	Have proposed a series of measures to reduce how much doctors are paid. Along with revisiting the medical-specialists deal, they want to prevent doctors from incorporating and limit fee-for-service billing.; The party maintains the vast majority of family medicine groups (GMFs) are for-profit enterprises. QS wants to force them to register as non-profits in order to receive public funds.
Education	Increased education system spending by 1.2 and 0.2 per cent, respectively, in the first two years of their mandate. Experts say annual increases of between three and four per cent were necessary to keep pace with inflation.; Tabled a plan in 2017 to boost the high school graduation rate from 68 per cent to 85 per cent by 2030, and hired 1,500 education professionals (including 600 more teachers) last year.; Promised to fix up schools and add physical activity and coding classes.	Has promised to gradually move toward free CEGEP and university tuition, beginning with low-income students. This measure, they estimate, will cost $400 million.; Will reduce funding for English-language CEGEPs in order to offer better quality English-language instruction in French CEGEPs.; Will provide affordable lunches for elementary school students at a cost of $39 million as well as cheaper school supplies, by having schools make bulk purchases on parents' behalf.	Wants to abolish school boards and replace them with service centres that would provide administrative support to schools. The party believes this would give schools greater autonomy and make the education system cheaper to run.; Wants to increase the mandatory age of staying in school to 18, to reduce the drop out rate.; Wants added homework help, extracurricular activities (sport and culture), additional funding for career guidance and tutors assigned to more vulnerable students.	Free education for all people living in the province, from daycare through to university. The party estimates that providing free education for Quebecers between the ages of 0-17 will cost the government $950 million annually.
Child Care and families	Offer free educational services for four-year-olds in government-subsidized daycare and child care centres (CPEs). They estimate this will cost Quebec an additional $250 million.; Families with children under 18 will get an extra $150 to $300 — per child, per year and tax-free — depending on family income.	Promise to cancel progressive pricing of subsidized daycare places. First child would cost $8.05/day, regardless of income. Second child: $4/day. Third would be free. Day care would also be free for families with revenue under $34,000.	The CAQ is also proposing to do away with progressive daycare pricing, though over a period of four years. All Quebec parents would be charged the same daily rate, regardless of their annual income.	Are proposing free daycare as part of their plan to offer free education between the ages of 0 and 17.
Identity, diversity, and secularism	Passed a religious neutrality law last year (known as Bill 62). The law requires, among other things, that people show their faces when either giving or receiving public services. This provision has been suspended pending a court decision on the law's constitutionality.; Couillard believes local police forces should decide whether women officers can wear the hijab.	Believes judges, prosecutors, prison guards and police should not be allowed to display religious symbols, such as wearing a hijab. They want the same prohibition to apply to all newly hired pre-school, elementary and high school teachers.	Opposes the wearing of religious symbols, including the hijab, by police officers and others who wield coercive state power. The party would also ban school teachers from wearing religious symbols.; Would pass a "Secularism Charter" to reduce the scope of religious accommodations available to civil servants.	Opposes the wearing of religious symbols, including the hijab, by police officers and others who hold coercive state power.; Believes citizens should be able to wear religious symbols and still access public services.
Sovereignty	Couillard is a well-known ardent federalist. He's expressed his desire to have Quebec sign the constitution, outlined in a 200-page document called "Quebecers: Our Way of Being Canadians".	While the party remains committed to Quebec independence, Lisée has promised not to hold a referendum on sovereignty in the first mandate of a PQ government. The earliest one would be held, he says, is 2022.	Calls itself nationalist. It wants more power for Quebec, but within Canada. Legault, a former PQ cabinet minister, has promised a CAQ government will never hold a referendum on Quebec sovereignty.; Legault wants to seek additional powers for Quebec, including control over immigration, increased fiscal capacity and a say in the nomination of Supreme Court justices. Some of these measures would require re-opening the Constitution.	Advocates independence. A QS government would organize elections for a constituent assembly, which would draft a constitution for an independent Quebec. That constitution would be put to a referendum.
Environment	Couillard has promised to spend an additional $2.9 billion by 2023 on sustainable mobility.; Supports existing cap-and-trade system designed to reduce greenhouse gases.	Would ban all new fossil fuel projects and existing projects would be subject to stricter oversight.; The Caisse de dépôt, Quebec's pension fund, would be instructed to divest from fossil fuel exploration, production and pipeline companies.	Supports international greenhouse gas reduction targets and would promote "technological innovations to ensure their achievement".	An ambitious program with the goal of reducing carbon dioxide emissions by 95 per cent in the next 30 years.; More sustainable waste management, including prohibiting the use of certain toxic products. Institute a "polluter pays" policy when it comes to waste.

== Opinion polls ==
The CAQ's landslide victory was, in part, surprising due to the close outcome that was projected by opinion polls during the campaigning period. Although polls estimated a difference of approximately 2% between the PLQ and the CAQ in the days leading up to the election, the results showed a 12.6% gap in voting. Studies suggest that this outcome is the result of an ongoing reconfiguration in Quebec's electoral system that is shifting from a two-party to a multi-party system, as the vote share for the QLP and the PQ had been on the decline since 2007. Additionally, the question of sovereignty, which had previously been a reliable indicator of voting choice was replaced by other matters such as identity, immigration, redistribution, and the environment. Research indicates that the polls may have been misled by this change in focus combined with last-minute moves toward the CAQ and the tendency of those who did not disclose their vote to disproportionately vote for the same party. The topic of identity appeared extremely important and was mobilized throughout individuals’ participation with the election campaigns. These findings suggest that the CAQ's shocking victory was the result of longstanding trends toward a multi-party system and a diversified agenda of topics which were not accurately predicted by the polls.

Evolution of voting intentions during the pre-campaign period of the 2018 Quebec general election.

Evolution of voting intentions during the campaign period of the 2018 Quebec general election.

Voting intentions among French speakers

== Candidates ==
- This table lists the names of the registered candidates as they appear on the official list published by the Chief Electoral Officer. The symbol ‡ indicates incumbent members not running for re-election.
- Abbreviations used in the table: Auto.: Équipe autonomiste. BP: Bloc pot. CAP: Citoyens au pouvoir du Québec. CAQ: Coalition avenir Québec - L'équipe François Legault. CINQ: Changement intégrité pour notre Québec. Conservative or Cons.: Conservative Party of Québec. Cul.: Parti culinaire du Québec. Green: Green Party of Québec. Ind.: Independent candidate. Liberal: Quebec Liberal Party. Marxist–Leninist or ML: Parti marxiste-léniniste du Québec. NDP: Nouveau Parti démocratique du Québec. Nul: Parti nul. PL: Parti libre. PQ: Parti québécois. Prov.: Alliance provinciale du Québec. P51: Parti 51. QS: Québec solidaire. VP: Voie du peuple.
- In this list, electoral districts are grouped by administrative region and regions are listed in the order of their administrative number. (However, some sections of the list group two regions that comprise a small number of districts.) Maps of the regions and the districts they include can be consulted at Élections Quebec.

=== Bas-Saint-Laurent and Gaspésie–Îles-de-la-Madeleine ===
Electoral district	Candidates					Incumbent
Electoral district	Liberal	PQ	CAQ	QS	Other	Incumbent
Bonaventure	François Whittom	Sylvain Roy	Hélène Desaulniers	Catherine Cyr Wright	Daniel Bouchard (CAP); Guy Gallant (Ind.); Heather Imhoff (Green)	Sylvain Roy
Côte-du-Sud	Simon Laboissonnière	Michel Forget	Marie-Eve Proulx	Guillaume Dufour	Renaud Blais (Nul); Gabriel Dubé (BP); Marc Roussin (Cons.)	Norbert Morin ‡
Gaspé	Alexandre Boulay	Méganne Perry-Mélançon	Louis LeBouthillier	Alexis Dumont-Blanchet		Gaétan Lelièvre ‡
Îles-de-la-Madeleine	Maryse Lapierre	Joël Arseneau	Yves Renaud	Robert Boudreau-Welsh		Germain Chevarie ‡
Matane-Matapédia	Annie Fournier	Pascal Bérubé	Mathieu Quenum	Marie-Phare Boucher	Pierre-Luc Coulombe (Green); Jocelyn Rioux (CAP); Paul-Émile Vignola (Cons.)	Pascal Bérubé
Rimouski	Claude Laroche	Harold LeBel	Nancy Levesque	Carol-Ann Kack	Denis Bélanger (Ind.); Dany Levesque (BP); Alexie Plourde (Green)	Harold LeBel
Rivière-du-Loup–Témiscouata	Jean D'Amour	Vincent Couture	Denis Tardif	Goulimine Sylvie Cadôret	Martin Perron (Cons.)	Jean D'Amour

=== Saguenay–Lac-Saint-Jean, Côte-Nord and Nord-du-Québec ===
Electoral district	Candidates						Incumbent
Electoral district	Liberal	PQ	CAQ	QS	Conservative	Other	Incumbent
Chicoutimi	Marie-Josée Morency	Mireille Jean	Andrée Laforest	Pierre Dostie	Leonard Gagnon	Tommy Philippe (Green)	Mireille Jean
Dubuc	Serge Simard	Marie-Annick Fortin	François Tremblay	Marie Francine Bienvenue	François Pelletier	Line Bélanger (Nul)	Serge Simard
Duplessis	Laurence Méthot	Lorraine Richard	Line Cloutier	Martine Roux	Alexandre Leblanc		Lorraine Richard
Jonquière	Alexandre Duguay	Sylvain Gaudreault	Benoit Rochefort	Marcel Lapointe	Jimmy Voyer	Julie Sion (Green)	Sylvain Gaudreault
Lac-Saint-Jean	Mathieu Huot	William Fradette	Éric Girard	Manon Girard	Michael Grecoff	Maude Gouin Huot (Auto.)	Alexandre Cloutier ‡
René-Lévesque	Jonathan Lapointe	Martin Ouellet	André Desrosiers	Sandrine Bourque	Eric Barnabé		Martin Ouellet
Roberval	Philippe Couillard	Thomas Gaudreault	Denise Trudel	Luc-Antoine Cauchon	Carl C. Lamontagne	Julie Boucher (CAP); Lynda Lalancette (Nul)	Philippe Couillard
Ungava	Jean Boucher	Jonathan Mattson	Denis Lamothe	Alisha Tukkiapik	Alexandre Croteau	Louis R. Couture (NDP) Cristina Roos (Green)	Jean Boucher

=== Capitale-Nationale ===
Electoral district	Candidates								Incumbent
Electoral district	Liberal	PQ	CAQ	QS	Green	Conservative	NDP	Other	Incumbent
Charlesbourg	François Blais	Annie Morin	Jonatan Julien	Élisabeth Germain		Valérie Tremblay		Daniel Pelletier (Auto.)	François Blais
Charlevoix–Côte-de-Beaupré	Caroline Simard	Nathalie Leclerc	Émilie Foster	Jessica Crossan			Andréanne Bouchard	Albert Chiasson (CAP)	Caroline Simard
Chauveau	Véronyque Tremblay	Jonathan Gagnon	Sylvain Lévesque	Francis Lajoie	Sabir Isufi	Adrien Pouliot	Mona Belleau		Véronyque Tremblay
Jean-Lesage	Gertrude Bourdon	Claire Vignola	Christiane Gamache	Sol Zanetti	Alex Paradis-Bellefeuille	Anne Deblois	Raymond Côté	Marie-Pierre Deschênes (CAP); Nicolas Bouffard-Savoie (Auto.); Claude Moreau (ML); Charles Verreault-Lemieux (Nul)	André Drolet ‡
Jean-Talon	Sébastien Proulx	Sylvain Barrette	Joëlle Boutin	Patrick Provost	Macarena Diab	Carl Bérubé	Hamid Nadji	Ginette Boutet (ML); Ali Dahan (Ind.); Stéphane Pouleur (Auto.)	Sébastien Proulx
La Peltrie	Stéphane Lacasse	Doni Berberi	Éric Caire	Alexandre Jobin-Lawler	Sandra Mara Riedo	Julie Plamondon		Kevin Bouchard (Nul); Yohann Dauphinais (CAP); Josée Mélanie Michaud (Auto.); Stephen Wright (P51)	Éric Caire
Louis-Hébert	Julie-Maude Perron	Normand Beauregard	Geneviève Guilbault	Guillaume Boivin	Daydree Vendette	Natalie Bjerke	Caroline Côté	Vincent Bégin (Ind.); Jean-Luc Rouckout (Auto.)	Geneviève Guilbault
Montmorency	Marie France Trudel	Alexandre Huot	Jean-François Simard	Marie-Christine Lamontagne	Nicholas Lescarbeau	Daniel Beaulieu		Jean Bédard (ML); Jean-François Simard (Ind.)	Raymond Bernier ‡
Portneuf	Philippe Gasse	Christian Hébert	Vincent Caron	Odile Pelletier		Guy Morin		Constance Guimont (CAP)	Michel Matte ‡
Taschereau	Florent Tanlet	Diane Lavallée	Svetlana Solomykina	Catherine Dorion	Élisabeth Grégoire		Roger Duguay	Christian Lavoie (CAP); Guy Boivin (Auto.); Nicolas Pouliot (Nul)	Agnès Maltais ‡
Vanier-Les Rivières	Patrick Huot	William Duquette	Mario Asselin	Monique Voisine	Samuel Raymond	Alain Fortin		Carl Côté (Ind.); David Dallaire (CAP); Carl-André Poliquin (Nul)	Patrick Huot

=== Mauricie ===
Electoral district	Candidates							Incumbent
Electoral district	Liberal	PQ	CAQ	QS	Green	Conservative	Other	Incumbent
Champlain	Pierre-Michel Auger	Gaëtan Leclerc	Sonia LeBel	Steven Roy Cullen	Stéphanie Dufresne	Pierre-Benoit Fortin	Éric Gauthier (Auto.); Anthony Rouss (BP)	Pierre-Michel Auger
Laviolette–Saint-Maurice	Pierre Giguère	Jacynthe Bruneau	Marie-Louise Tardif	Christine Cardin		Ugo Hamel	Jacques Gosselin (CAP)	Julie Boulet ‡ Laviolette
Laviolette–Saint-Maurice	Pierre Giguère	Jacynthe Bruneau	Marie-Louise Tardif	Christine Cardin		Ugo Hamel	Jacques Gosselin (CAP)	Merged riding
Laviolette–Saint-Maurice	Pierre Giguère	Jacynthe Bruneau	Marie-Louise Tardif	Christine Cardin		Ugo Hamel	Jacques Gosselin (CAP)	Pierre Giguère; Saint-Maurice
Maskinongé	Marc H. Plante	Nicole Morin	Simon Allaire	Simon Piotte	Amélie St-Yves	Maxime Rousseau	Jonathan Beaulieu-Richard (Ind.); Alain Bélanger (CAP)	Marc H. Plante
Trois-Rivières	Jean-Denis Girard	Marie-Claude Camirand	Jean Boulet	Valérie Delage	Adis Simidzija	Daniel Hénault		Jean-Denis Girard

=== Estrie ===
Electoral district	Candidates							Incumbent
Electoral district	Liberal	PQ	CAQ	QS	Green	CAP	Other	Incumbent
Mégantic	Robert G. Roy	Gloriane Blais	François Jacques	Andrée Larrivée	Sylvain Dodier	Richard Veilleux		Ghislain Bolduc ‡
Orford	Guy Madore	Maxime Leclerc	Gilles Bélanger	Annabelle Lalumière-Ting	Stéphanie Desmeules	Tommy Poulin	Joseph Tremblay-Bonsens (Cons.)	Pierre Reid ‡
Richmond	Annie Godbout	Véronique Vigneault	André Bachand	Colombe Landry	Yves la Madeleine	Déitane Gendron	Karl Brousseau (Cons.)	Karine Vallières ‡
Saint-François	Charles Poulin	Solange Masson	Geneviève Hébert	Kévin Côté	Mathieu Morin	Cyrille Mc Elreavy		Guy Hardy ‡
Sherbrooke	Luc Fortin	Guillaume Rousseau	Bruno Vachon	Christine Labrie	Marie-Maud Côté-Rouleau	Éric Lebrasseur	Luc Lainé (Ind.); Mona Louis-Jean (NDP); Sara Richard (Nul); Jossy Roy (BP); Patrick Tétreault (Ind.)	Luc Fortin

=== Montréal ===
==== East ====
Electoral district	Candidates								Incumbent
Electoral district	Liberal	PQ	CAQ	QS	Green	Conservative	NDP	Other	Incumbent
Anjou–Louis-Riel	Lise Thériault	Karl Dugal	Michèle Gamelin	Marie-Josée Forget	Hamza Madani		Vincent Henes		Lise Thériault
Bourassa-Sauvé	Paule Robitaille	Karine Gauvin	Julie Séide	Alejandra Zaga Mendez	Karina Barros	Michel Boissonneault	Abed Louis	Jean-François Brunet (BP); Sabrinel Laouadi (CINQ); Jean Marie Floriant Ndzana (Ind.)	Rita de Santis ‡
Bourget	Vincent Girard	Maka Kotto	Richard Campeau	Marlène Lessard	Marieke Hassell-Crépeau			Dany Roy (CAP); Claude Brunelle (ML)	Maka Kotto
Gouin	Alessandra Lubrina	Olivier Gignac	Arianne Lebel	Gabriel Nadeau-Dubois	Alice Sécheresse			Jenny Cartwright (Nul); Ana da Silva (BP)	Gabriel Nadeau-Dubois
Hochelaga-Maisonneuve	Julien Provencher-Proulx	Carole Poirier	Sarah Beaumier	Alexandre Leduc		Mathieu Beaudoin	Éric-Abel Baland	Gabriel Boily (CAP); Christine Dandenault (ML); Etienne Mallette (BP)	Carole Poirier
Jeanne-Mance–Viger	Filomena Rotiroti	Marie-Josée Bruneau	Sarah Petrari	Ismaël Seck	Sylvie Hétu	Sylvain Dallaire		Garnet Colly (ML)	Filomena Rotiroti
LaFontaine	Marc Tanguay	Claude Gauthier	Loredana Bacchi	David Touchette		Caleb Lavoie		Yves Le Seigle (ML)	Marc Tanguay
Laurier-Dorion	George Tsantrizos	Marie-Aline Vadius	Simon Langelier	Andrés Fontecilla	Juan Vazquez	Mohammad Yousuf	Apostolia Petropoulos	Arezki Malek (ML); Mathieu Marcil (Nul); Eric Lessard (CAP); Hugô St-Onge (BP); Chef Jean Louis Thémis (Cul.)	Gerry Sklavounos ‡
Maurice-Richard	Marie Montpetit	Frédéric Lapointe	Manon Gauthier	Raphaël Rebelo	Gilles Fournelle		Jean Rémillard	Morgan Ali (BP); Manon Dupuis (Nul); Daniel St-Hilaire (CAP)	Marie Montpetit
Mercier	Gabrielle Collu	Michelle Blanc	Johanne Gagné	Ruba Ghazal	Stephanie Rochemont	Ludovic Proulx	Conrad Thompson	Serge Lachapelle (ML); Malou Marcil (Nul)	Amir Khadir ‡
Pointe-aux-Trembles	Eric Ouellette	Jean-Martin Aussant	Chantal Rouleau	Céline Pereira				Louis Chandonnet (Auto.); Geneviève Royer (ML); Pierre Surette (BP)	Nicole Léger ‡
Rosemont	Agata La Rosa	Jean-François Lisée	Sonya Cormier	Vincent Marissal	Karl Dubois	Alexandra Liendo	Paulina Ayala	Stéphane Chénier (ML); Coralie Laperrière (BP); Catherine Raymond-Poirier (Nul)	Jean-François Lisée
Sainte-Marie–Saint-Jacques	Louis Charron	Jennifer Drouin	Anna Klisko	Manon Massé	Anna Calderon	Don Ivanski		Alexis Cossette-Trudel (CAP); Henri Ladouceur (BP)	Manon Massé
Viau	Frantz Benjamin	Mounddy Sanon	Janny Gaspard	Sylvain Lafrenière		Patrick St-Onge	Mamoun Ahmed	Beverly Bernardo (Ind.); Hugo Pépino (BP)	David Heurtel ‡

==== West ====
Electoral district	Candidates								Incumbent
Electoral district	Liberal	PQ	CAQ	QS	Green	Conservative	NDP	Other	Incumbent
Acadie	Christine St-Pierre	Farida Sam	Sophie Chiasson	Viviane Martinova-Croteau	Laurence Sicotte	Jocelyn Chouinard	Michel Welt	Yvon Breton (ML)	Christine St-Pierre
D'Arcy-McGee	David Birnbaum	Eliane Pion	Mélodie Cohn	Jean-Claude Kumuyange	Jérémie Alarco	Yaniv Loran	Leigh Smit	Diane Johnston (ML)	David Birnbaum
Jacques-Cartier	Greg Kelley	Martine Bourgeois	Karen Hilchey	Nicolas Chatel-Launay	Catherine Polson	Louis-Charles Fortier	France Séguin	Cynthia Bouchard (CAP); Teodor Daiev (Ind.)	Geoffrey Kelley ‡
Marguerite-Bourgeoys	Hélène David	Jeannot Desbiens	Vicky Michaud	Camille St-Laurent	Smail Louardiane		Nashaat Elsayed		Robert Poëti ‡
Marquette	Enrico Ciccone	Carole Vincent	Marc Hétu	Anick Perreault	Kimberly Salt	Olivia Boye	John Symon	Roger Déry (Ind.); Patrick Desjardins (CAP)	François Ouimet ‡
Mont-Royal–Outremont	Pierre Arcand	Caroline Labelle	Anne-Marie Gagnon	Eve Torres	Vincent J. Carbonneau	Yaakov Pollak	Rebecca Anne Clark	Normand Fournier (ML)	Pierre Arcand; Mont-Royal
Mont-Royal–Outremont	Pierre Arcand	Caroline Labelle	Anne-Marie Gagnon	Eve Torres	Vincent J. Carbonneau	Yaakov Pollak	Rebecca Anne Clark	Normand Fournier (ML)	Merged riding
Mont-Royal–Outremont	Pierre Arcand	Caroline Labelle	Anne-Marie Gagnon	Eve Torres	Vincent J. Carbonneau	Yaakov Pollak	Rebecca Anne Clark	Normand Fournier (ML)	Hélène David; Outremont
Nelligan	Monsef Derraji	Chantal Legendre	Angela Rapoport	Simon Tremblay-Pepin	Giuseppe Cammarrota	Mathew Levitsky-Kaminski	Leslie Eric Murphy		Martin Coiteux ‡
Notre-Dame-de-Grâce	Kathleen Weil	Lucie Bélanger	Nathalie Dansereau	Kathleen Gudmundsson	Chad Walcott	Souhail Ftouh	David-Roger Gagnon	Rachel Hoffman (ML); Cynthia Nichols (Ind.)	Kathleen Weil
Robert-Baldwin	Carlos J. Leitão	Marie-Imalta Pierre-Lys	Laura Azéroual	Zachary Williams	Catherine Richardson	Michael-Louis Coppa	Luca Brown		Carlos Leitão
Saint-Henri–Sainte-Anne	Dominique Anglade	Dieudonné Ella-Oyono	Sylvie Hamel	Benoit Racette	Jean-Pierre Duford	Caroline Orchard	Steven Scott	Félix Gagnon-Paquin (BP); Linda Sullivan (ML); Christopher Young (CINQ)	Dominique Anglade
Saint-Laurent	Marwah Rizqy	Elias Dib Nicolas	Marc Baaklini	Marie Josèphe Pigeon	Halimatou Bah	Guy Morissette	Jacques Dago	Fernand Deschamps (ML)	Jean-Marc Fournier ‡
Verdun	Isabelle Melançon	Constantin Fortier	Nicole Leduc	Vanessa Roy	Alex Tyrrell	Yedidya-Eitan Moryoussef	Raphaël Fortin	Marc-André Milette (Nul); Hugo Richard (BP); Eileen Studd (ML)	Isabelle Melançon
Westmount–Saint-Louis	Jennifer Maccarone	J. Marion Benoit	Michelle Morin	Ekaterina Piskunova	Samuel Dajakran Kuhn	Mikey Colangelo Lauzon	Nicholas Peter Lawson		Jacques Chagnon ‡

=== Outaouais and Abitibi-Témiscamingue ===
Electoral district	Candidates								Incumbent
Electoral district	Liberal	PQ	CAQ	QS	Green	Conservative	CAP	Other	Incumbent
Abitibi-Est	Guy Bourgeois	Élizabeth Larouche	Pierre Dufour	Lyne Cyr	Mélina Paquette		Éric Caron		Guy Bourgeois
Abitibi-Ouest	Martin Veilleux	Sylvain Vachon	Suzanne Blais	Rose Marquis	Yan Dominic Couture	Eric Lacroix	Stéphane Lévesque	Maxim Sylvestre (Ind.)	François Gendron ‡
Rouyn-Noranda–Témiscamingue	Luc Blanchette	Gilles Chapadeau	Jérémy G. Bélanger	Émilise Lessard-Therrien	Jessica Wells	Guillaume Lanouette	Fernand St-Georges		Luc Blanchette

Electoral district	Candidates								Incumbent
Electoral district	Liberal	PQ	CAQ	QS	Green	Conservative	Marxist-Leninist	Other	Incumbent
Chapleau	Marc Carrière	Blake Ippersiel	Mathieu Lévesque	Alexandre Albert		Rowen Tanguay	Françoise Roy		Marc Carrière
Gatineau	Luce Farrell	Jonathan Carreiro-Benoit	Robert Bussière	Milan Bernard	Jasper Boychuk	Mario Belec	Alexandre Deschênes		Stéphanie Vallée ‡
Hull	Maryse Gaudreault	Marysa Nadeau	Rachel Bourdon	Benoit Renaud	Patricia Pilon	Jean-Philippe Chaussé	Pierre Soublière	Marco Jetté (CAP); Nichola St-Jean (NDP)	Maryse Gaudreault
Papineau	Alexandre Iracà	Yves Destroismaisons	Mathieu Lacombe	Mélanie Pilon-Gauvin	Michel Tardif	Joanne Godin		Lynn Boyer (CAP); Claude Flaus (P51); Isabelle Yde (Nul)	Alexandre Iracà
Pontiac	André Fortin	Marie-Claire Nivolon	Olive Kamanyana	Julia Wilkie	Roger Fleury	Kenny Roy	Louis Lang	Samuel Gendron (NDP)	André Fortin

=== Chaudière-Appalaches ===
Electoral district	Candidates								Incumbent
Electoral district	Liberal	PQ	CAQ	QS	Green	Conservative	CAP	Other	Incumbent
Beauce-Nord	Myriam Taschereau	Daniel Perron	Luc Provençal	Fernand Dorval		Isabelle Villeneuve	Nicole Goulet		André Spénard ‡
Beauce-Sud	Paul Busque	Guillaume Grondin	Samuel Poulin	Diane Vincent	Cassandre Poulin	Milan Jovanovic	Jean Paquet	Hans Mercier (P51)	Paul Busque
Bellechasse	Dominique Vien	Benoît Béchard	Stéphanie Lachance	Benoit Comeau		Dominique Messner		Simon Guay (BP); Sébastien Roy (Prov.)	Dominique Vien
Chutes-de-la-Chaudière	Ghyslain Vaillancourt	Serge Bonin	Marc Picard	Olivier Bolduc		Philippe Gaboury	Stéphane Blais	Evelyne Henry (NDP)	Marc Picard
Lévis	Abdulkadir Abkey	Pierre-Gilles Morel	François Paradis	Georges Goma	Maude Bussière	Michel Walters	Nancy Fournier	Lorraine Chartier (NDP); Stéphane L'heureux-Blouin (BP)	François Paradis
Lotbinière-Frontenac	Pierre-Luc Daigle	Yohann Beaulieu	Isabelle Lecours	Normand Beaudet	Marie-Claude Dextraze	Réjean Labbé	Yves Roy	Daniel Croteau (P51)	Laurent Lessard ‡

=== Centre-du-Québec ===
Electoral district	Candidates								Incumbent
Electoral district	Liberal	PQ	CAQ	QS	Green	Conservative	CAP	Other	Incumbent
Arthabaska	Pierre Poirier	Jacques Daigle	Éric Lefebvre	William Champigny-Fortier	Jean-Charles Pelland	Lisette Guay Gaudreault		Jean Landry (Prov.)	Éric Lefebvre
Drummond–Bois-Francs	Kevin Deland	Diane Roy	Sébastien Schneeberger	Lannïck Dinard		François Picard		Sylvain Marcoux (Ind.); Steve Therion (Auto.)	Sébastien Schneeberger
Johnson	François Vaes	Jacques Tétreault	André Lamontagne	Sarah Saint-Cyr Lanoie	Émile Coderre	Jean-François Vignola	Yves Audet	Andrew Leblanc-Marcil (NDP)	André Lamontagne
Nicolet-Bécancour	Marie-Claude Durand	Lucie Allard	Donald Martel	François Poisson	Vincent Marcotte	Jessie Mc Nicoll		Blak D. Blackburn (BP)	Donald Martel

=== Laval ===
Electoral district	Candidates								Incumbent
Electoral district	Liberal	PQ	CAQ	QS	Green	Conservative	NDP	Other	Incumbent
Chomedey	Guy Ouellette	Ouerdia Nacera Beddad	Alice Abou-Khalil	Rabah Moulla	Fatine Kabbaj	Nick Keramarios	Omar El-Harrache		Guy Ouellette
Fabre	Monique Sauvé	Odette Lavigne	Adriana Dudas	Nora Yata	David Gilbert-Parisée	Juliett Zuniga Lopez	Karim Mahmoodi		Monique Sauvé
Laval-des-Rapides	Saul Polo	Jocelyn Caron	Christine Mitton	Graciela Mateo	Estelle Obeo	Benoit Larocque	Jean Phariste Pharicien	Bianca Bozsodi (CAP); Elias Progakis (PL)	Saul Polo
Mille-Îles	Francine Charbonneau	Michel Lachance	Mauro Barone	Jean Trudelle	Alain Joseph			Dwayne Cappelletti (PL); Jason D'Aoust (BP)	Francine Charbonneau
Sainte-Rose	Jean Habel	Marc-André Constantin	Christopher Skeete	Simon Charron	Caroline Bergevin	Benoit Blanchard	Alain Giguère	Valérie Louis-Charles (CINQ)	Jean Habel
Vimont	Jean Rousselle	Sylvie Moreau	Michel Reeves	Caroline Trottier-Gascon	Mélanie Messier	Rachel Landerman	Andriana Kocini	Jean-Marc Boyer (Ind.); Rachel Demers (CAP)	Jean Rousselle

=== Lanaudière ===
Electoral district	Candidates							Incumbent
Electoral district	Liberal	PQ	CAQ	QS	Green	Conservative	CAP	Incumbent
Berthier	Robert Magnan	André Villeneuve	Caroline Proulx	Louise Beaudry	Jérôme St-Jean		Rémi Bourdon	André Villeneuve
Joliette	Emilie Imbeault	Véronique Hivon	François St-Louis	Judith Sicard	Étienne St-Jean		Sébastien Dupuis	Véronique Hivon
L'Assomption	Virginie Bouchard	Sylvie Langlois Brouillette	François Legault	Marie-Claude Brière	Eve Bellavance	Charles-Etienne Everitt-Raynault	Sylvie Tougas	François Legault
Masson	Maryanne Beauchamp	Diane Gadoury Hamelin	Mathieu Lemay	Stéphane Durupt	Véronique Dubois	David Morin		Mathieu Lemay
Repentigny	Emilie Therrien	Eric Tremblay	Lise Lavallée	Olivier Huard	Chafika Hebib	Pierre Lacombe	Julie Girard	Lise Lavallée
Rousseau	Patrick Watson	Nicolas Marceau	Louis-Charles Thouin	Hélène Dubé		Richard Evanko	Michel Lacasse	Nicolas Marceau
Terrebonne	Margaux Selam	Mathieu Traversy	Pierre Fitzgibbon	Anne B-Godbout	Carole Dubois	Jules Néron	Mathieu Goyette	Mathieu Traversy

=== Laurentides ===
Electoral district	Candidates								Incumbent
Electoral district	Liberal	PQ	CAQ	QS	Green	Conservative	CAP	Other	Incumbent
Argenteuil	Bernard Bigras-Denis	Patrick Côté	Agnès Grondin	Céline Lachapelle	Carole Thériault	Sherwin Edwards	Louise Wiseman	Stéphanie Boyer (PL); Yves St-Denis (Ind.)	Yves St-Denis
Bertrand	Diane de Passillé	Gilbert Lafrenière	Nadine Girault	Mylène Jaccoud	Natacha Alarie	Kathy Laframboise	Benoît Pigeon	Benoit Martin (PL)	Claude Cousineau ‡
Blainville	Lucia Carvalho	Gabriel Gousse	Mario Laframboise	William Lepage	Valérie Fortier		Jean Bastien	Thierry Gervais (NDP)	Mario Laframboise
Deux-Montagnes	Fabienne Fatou Diop	Daniel Goyer	Benoit Charette	Audrey Lesage-Lanthier	Isabelle Dagenais	Delia Fodor	Denis Paré	Martin Brulé (PL); Eric Emond (CINQ); Hans Roker Jr (BP)	Benoit Charette
Groulx	Sabrina Chartrand	Jean-Philippe Meloche	Eric Girard	Fabien Torres	Robin Dick	Vincent Aubé	Chantal Lavoie	Claude Surprenant (Ind.)	Claude Surprenant
Labelle	Nadine Riopel	Sylvain Pagé	Chantale Jeannotte	Gabriel Dagenais	René Fournier	Francis Brosseau	Régis Ostigny		Sylvain Pagé
Les Plaines	Vincent Orellana-Pepin	Marc-Olivier Leblanc	Lucie Lecours	Kévin St-Jean	Boris Geynet	Mathieu Laliberté		Mathieu Stevens (PL)	New district
Mirabel	Camille Arsenault Brideau	Denise Beaudoin	Sylvie D'Amours	Marjolaine Goudreau	Émilie Paiement	Désiré Mounanga		Vincent Laurin (BP); Patricia Vaca (CINQ)	Sylvie D'Amours
Prévost	Naömie Goyette	Paul St-Pierre Plamondon	Marguerite Blais	Lucie Mayer		Malcolm Mulcahy		Michel Leclerc (PL)	New district
Saint-Jérôme	Antoine Poulin	Marc Bourcier	Youri Chassin	Ève Duhaime	Annabelle Desrochers	Normand Michaud	Sylvie Brien	Christine Simon (NDP); Giuseppe Starnino (PL)	Marc Bourcier

=== Montérégie ===
==== Eastern ====
Electoral district	Candidates								Incumbent
Electoral district	Liberal	PQ	CAQ	QS	Green	Conservative	NDP	Other	Incumbent
Borduas	Martin Nichols	Cédric G.-Ducharme	Simon Jolin-Barrette	Annie Desharnais	Nicolas Gravel	André Lecompte	André Martin	Razz E. (BP); Stéphane Thévenot (CAP)	Simon Jolin-Barrette
Brome-Missisquoi	Ingrid Marini	Andréanne Larouche	Isabelle Charest	Alexandre Legault	Elisabeth Dionne			Marc Alarie (VP); Manon Gamache (CAP)	Pierre Paradis ‡
Chambly	François Villeneuve	Christian Picard	Jean-François Roberge	Francis Vigeant	Camille B. Jannard	Guy L'Heureux	Gilles Létourneau	Gilles Guindon (CINQ); Benjamin Vachon (BP)	Jean-François Roberge
Granby	Lyne Laverdure	Chantal Beauchemin	François Bonnardel	Anne-Sophie Legault	Daphné Poulin	Pierre Bélanger		Stéphane Deschamps (Nul); Kevin Robidas (BP)	François Bonnardel
Iberville	Mylène Gaudreau	Nicolas Dionne	Claire Samson	Philippe Jetten-Vigeant	Michelle Kolatschek	Serge Benoit	Marc-André Renaud	Dany Desjardins (BP)	Claire Samson
Richelieu	Sophie Chevalier	Sylvain Rochon	Jean-Bernard Émond	Sophie Pagé-Sabourin	Ksenia Svetoushkina	Patrick Corriveau			Sylvain Rochon
Saint-Hyacinthe	Annie Pelletier	Daniel Breton	Chantal Soucy	Marijo Demers			Luc Chulak		Chantal Soucy
Saint-Jean	Vanessa Parent	Dave Turcotte	Louis Lemieux	Simon Lalonde	Véronique Langlois	Philippe Perreault	Geneviève Ruel	Louis Saint-Jacques (CAP)	Dave Turcotte
Verchères	Agnieszka Wnorowska	Stéphane Bergeron	Suzanne Dansereau	Jean-René Péloquin	Pierre-Olivier Downey	Lisette Benoit	Vincent Hillel		Stéphane Bergeron

==== South Shore ====
Electoral district	Candidates								Incumbent
Electoral district	Liberal	PQ	CAQ	QS	Green	Conservative	NDP	Other	Incumbent
Beauharnois	Félix Rhéaume	Mireille Théorêt	Claude Reid	Pierre-Paul St-Onge		Yannick Campeau	François Mantion	Tommy Mathieu (CAP)	Guy Leclair ‡
Châteauguay	Pierre Moreau	Jean-Philippe Thériault	MarieChantal Chassé	Sandrine Garcia-McDiarmid	Stephanie Stevenson	Jeff Benoit	Marie-Ève Masucci-Lauzon		Pierre Moreau
Huntingdon	Stéphane Billette	Huguette Hébert	Claire IsaBelle	Aiden Hodgins-Ravensbergen	Victoria Mary Haliburton	Jérémie Ouellette	Charles Orme		Stéphane Billette
La Pinière	Gaétan Barrette	Suzanne Gagnon	Sylvia Baronian	Marie Pagès	Aziza Dini	Anwar El Youbi	Djaouida Sellah	Patrick Hayes (Ind.); Fang Hu (Ind.)	Gaétan Barrette
Laporte	Nicole Ménard	Annie Lessard	Jacinthe-Eve Arel	Claude Lefrançois	Sabrina Huet-Côté	Linda Therrien	Marc André Audet		Nicole Ménard
La Prairie	Richard Merlini	Cathy Lepage	Christian Dubé	Daniel Blouin	Alexandre Caron	Alain Desmarais	Boukare Tall	Normand Chouinard (ML); Liana Minato (P51)	Richard Merlini
Marie-Victorin	Sonia Ziadé	Catherine Fournier	Martyne Prévost	Carl Lévesque	Laeticia Poiré-Hill		Myriam de Grandpré-Ruel	Shirley Cedent (CINQ); Pierre Chénier (ML); Florent Portron (Auto.)	Catherine Fournier
Montarville	Ludovic Grisé Farand	Daniel Michelin	Nathalie Roy	Caroline Charette			Lise Roy	Jean Dury (BP)	Nathalie Roy
Sanguinet	Marcelina Jugureanu	Alain Therrien	Danielle McCann	Maya Fréchette-Bonnier	Antonino Geraci	Nikolai Grigoriev		Hélène Héroux (ML)	Alain Therrien
Soulanges	Lucie Charlebois	Samuelle Ducrocq-Henry	Marilyne Picard	Maxime Larue-Bourdages	Bianca Jitaru	Felice Trombino	Etienne Madelein	Jean-Patrick Berthiaume (BP); Patrick Marquis (Auto.); Dominik Prud'homme (CAP)	Lucie Charlebois
Taillon	Mohammed Barhone	Diane Lamarre	Lionel Carmant	Manon Blanchard	Mel-Lyna Cadieux Walker	Gerardin Verty	Jonathan Leduc		Diane Lamarre
Vachon	Linda Caron	Patrick Ney	Ian Lafrenière	André Vincent		Lise des Greniers	Ian Lecourtois	Hugo Bluntss (BP); Stéphane Marginean (CAP)	Martine Ouellet ‡
Vaudreuil	Marie-Claude Nichols	Philip Lapalme	Claude Bourbonnais	Igor Erchov	Jason Mossa	Ryan Robertson	Ryan Young	Camille Piché-Jetté (BP); Daniel Pilon (CAP)	Marie-Claude Nichols

== Results ==
The CAQ went into the election as the third party in the legislature, but won a decisive victory with 74 seats, exceeding all published opinion polling. The Liberals won 31 seats, while Québec solidaire and the Parti Québécois each won 10 seats. This is the second election in a row in which a government has been defeated after only one term.

The CAQ formed government for the first time, mainly by dominating its traditional heartlands of Capitale-Nationale, Chaudière-Appalaches and Centre-du-Québec, while winning sweeps or near-sweeps in Mauricie, Estrie, Lanaudière, Montérégie, the Laurentides and northern Quebec. Many of their gains came at the expense of the PQ. The CAQ took a number of seats that had been in PQ hands for four decades or more, in some cases by landslide margins. It did, however, win only two seats in Montreal.

The Parti Québécois came up two seats short of official status in the legislature. Notably, it was completely shut out in Montreal for the first time in decades; indeed, it won only one seat (Marie-Victorin in Longueuil) in the entire Greater Montreal area. It was easily the PQ's worst showing in a provincial election in 45 years. For the second election in a row, its leader was unseated in his own riding. According to a postmortem by The Globe and Mail, the PQ was so decisively beaten that there were already questions about whether it could survive. Echoing this, Christian Bourque of Montreal-based pollster Léger Marketing told The Guardian that he believed the PQ was likely finished in its present form, and would have to merge with another sovereigntist party to avoid fading into irrelevance.

The election was viewed as the Liberals' worst defeat since the 1976 election. While the party more than held its own in Montreal (where it won 19 out of 27 seats) and Laval (where it retained all but one seat), it only won seven seats elsewhere.

This was the first election in which Québec Solidaire won seats outside Montreal, taking one seat from the PQ and three from the Liberals.

The CAQ won 37.4 per cent of the popular vote, a smaller vote share than the Liberals' 41 per cent in 2014 and the lowest vote share on record for a party winning a majority government. However, due to the nature of the first-past-the-post system, which awards power solely on the basis of seats won, the CAQ's heavy concentration of support in the regions they dominated was enough for a strong majority of 11 seats. Quebec elections have historically seen large disparities between the raw vote and the actual seat count.

Following the elections, both Jean-François Lisée and Philippe Couillard resigned.

Summary of the National Assembly of Quebec election results (October 1, 2018)
Political party	Party leader	MNAs					Votes			
Political party	Party leader	Candidates	2014	Dissol.	2018	±	#	±	%	± (pp)
Coalition Avenir Québec	François Legault	125	22	21	74	53▲	1,509,455	533,848▲	37.42	14.37▲
Liberal	Philippe Couillard	125	70	68	31	37▼	1,001,037	756,034▼	24.82	16.70▼
Parti Québécois	Jean-François Lisée	125	30	28	10	18▼	687,995	386,125▼	17.06	8.32▼
Québec solidaire	Manon Massé, Gabriel Nadeau-Dubois	125	3	3	10	7▲	649,503	326,379▲	16.10	8.47▲
Independent		21	–	5	–	5▼	6,462	8,899▼	0.16	0.20▼
Green	Alex Tyrrell	97	–	–	–	–	67,870	44,707▲	1.68	1.13▲
Conservative	Adrien Pouliot	101	–	–	–	–	59,055	42,626▲	1.46	1.07▲
New Democratic	Raphaël Fortin	59	–	–	–	–	22,863	New	0.57	New
Citoyens au pouvoir du Québec	Stéphane Blais (intérim)	56	–	–	–	–	13,768	12,477▲	0.34	0.31▲
Bloc Pot	Jean-Patrick Berthiaume	29	–	–	–	–	4,657	1,967▲	0.12	0.06▲
Parti nul	Renaud Blais	16	–	–	–	–	3,659	3,880▼	0.09	0.03▼
Marxist–Leninist	Pierre Chénier	25	–	–	–	–	1,708	308▼	0.04	0.01▼
Parti libre	Michel Leclerc	8	–	–	–	–	1,678	New	0.04	New
Équipe Autonomiste	Stéphane Pouleur	12	–	–	–	–	1,138	738▲	0.03	0.02▲
Parti 51	Hans Mercier	5	–	–	–	–	1,117	New	0.03	New
Changement intégrité pour notre Québec	Eric Emond	7	–	–	–	–	693	New	0.02	New
Alliance provinciale	Sébastien Roy	2	–	–	–	–	521	New	0.01	New
Voie du peuple	Marc Alarie	1	–	–	–	–	190	New	–	New
Parti culinaire	Jean-Louis Thémistocle	1	–	–	–	–	169	New	–	New
Option nationale	n/a						Merged with QS			0.73▼
Parti équitable	Patricia Domingos	–	–	–	–	–	did not campaign			0.04▼
Mon pays le Québec	n/a						Party dissolved			0.01▼
Unité Nationale	n/a						Party dissolved			0.01▼
Quebec – Democratic Revolution	n/a						Party dissolved			–
Parti indépendantiste	n/a						Party dissolved			–
Quebec Citizens' Union	n/a						Party dissolved			–
Total		940	125	125	125		4,033,538	198,724▼		
Rejected ballots							66,085	3,292▲		
Voter turnout							4,099,623	195,432▼	66.45%	4.99▼
Registered electors							6,169,772	157,282▲		

=== Vote and seat summaries ===
Ternary plots - shift of electoral support (2014-2018)
2014

2018
Electoral districts identified by colours of winning parties

Vote share
CAQ	37.42%
PLQ	24.82%
PQ	17.06%
QS	16.10%
Green	1.68%
PCQ	1.46%
Others	1.46%

Seats
CAQ	59.20%
PLQ	24.80%
PQ	8.00%
QS	8.00%

=== Summary analysis ===
Popular vote
party	year	votes	change
CAQ	2014	23.05%	+14.37%
CAQ	2018	37.42%	+14.37%
Liberal	2014	41.52%	−16.70%
Liberal	2018	24.82%	−16.70%
PQ	2014	25.38%	−8.32%
PQ	2018	17.06%	−8.32%
QS	2014	7.63%	+8.47%
QS	2018	16.10%	+8.47%
Others	2014	2.42%	+2.18%
Others	2018	4.60%	+2.18%

Elections to the National Assembly of Quebec – seats won/lost by party, 2014–2018
Party	2014	Gain from (loss to)										2018
Party	2014	CAQ		Lib		PQ		QS		New riding	Dissolved riding	2018
Coalition Avenir Québec	22			31		18				3		74
Liberal	70		(31)				(1)		(4)	1	(4)	31
Parti Québécois	30		(18)	1					(3)			10
Québec solidaire	3			4		3						10
Total	125	–	(49)	36	–	21	(1)	–	(7)	4	(4)	125

Resulting composition of the 42nd Quebec Legislature
Source		Party				
Source		CAQ	Lib	PQ	QS	Total
Seats retained	Incumbents returned	18	22	8	2	50
Seats retained	Open seats held	2	8	1	1	12
Seats retained	Byelection loss reversed	1				1
Seats changing hands	Incumbents defeated	33			4	37
Seats changing hands	Open seats gained	16		1	3	20
Seats changing hands	Byelection gain held	1				1
New ridings	Incumbent from dissolved riding returned		1			1
New ridings	Former MNA returned	1				1
New ridings	New MNAs	2				2
Total		74	31	10	10	125

=== Synopsis of riding results ===
Results by riding - 2018 Quebec general election
Riding	Winning party								Turnout (Note: including spoilt ballots)	Votes (Note: All parties with more than 1% of the vote are shown individually. Independent candidates and other minor parties are aggregated separately. Parties are presented in the order shown on EQ data.)										
Name	2014	1st place	Votes	Share	Margin #	Margin %	2nd place	3rd place	Turnout	CAQ	PLQ	PQ	QS	PVQ	PCQ	NDP	CPQ	Ind	Other	Total
Abitibi-Est	PLQ	CAQ	8,967	42.72%	4,877	23.23%	PQ	PLQ	63.79%	8,967	3,936	4,090	3,287	356	–	–	355	–	–	20,991
Abitibi-Ouest	PQ	CAQ	7,680	34.12%	194	0.86%	PQ	QS	64.75%	7,680	2,546	7,486	3,735	254	248	–	388	172	–	22,509
Acadie	PLQ	PLQ	14,305	53.80%	9,914	37.28%	CAQ	QS	54.17%	4,391	14,305	2,394	3,656	737	579	442	–	–	87	26,591
Anjou–Louis-Riel	PLQ	PLQ	10,802	39.06%	2,807	10.15%	CAQ	PQ	64.49%	7,995	10,802	4,064	4,018	519	–	256	–	–	–	27,654
Argenteuil	PLQ	CAQ	11,848	38.88%	5,405	17.73%	PQ	PLQ	65.33%	11,848	5,306	6,443	3,710	552	472	–	135	1,778	233	30,477
Arthabaska	CAQ	CAQ	25,640	61.84%	20,425	49.26%	QS	PLQ	69.49%	25,640	4,707	3,897	5,215	620	968	–	–	–	418	41,465
Beauce-Nord	CAQ	CAQ	20,039	66.37%	15,310	50.71%	PLQ	QS	70.79%	20,039	4,729	1,546	2,131	–	1,414	–	334	–	–	30,193
Beauce-Sud	PLQ	CAQ	20,936	62.68%	13,978	41.85%	PLQ	QS	69.13%	20,936	6,958	1,374	1,934	500	830	–	170	–	700	33,402
Beauharnois	PQ	CAQ	14,947	46.70%	7,952	24.85%	PQ	QS	68.62%	14,947	4,069	6,995	4,816	–	288	459	429	–	–	32,003
Bellechasse	PLQ	CAQ	16,302	53.85%	8,079	26.69%	PLQ	QS	70.10%	16,302	8,223	2,198	2,272	–	976	–	–	–	303	30,274
Berthier	PQ	CAQ	18,048	45.13%	6,481	16.21%	PQ	QS	69.84%	18,048	3,052	11,567	6,169	687	–	–	467	–	–	39,990
Bertrand	PQ	CAQ	13,867	41.55%	6,052	18.13%	PQ	QS	67.60%	13,867	4,471	7,815	6,047	613	261	–	197	–	107	33,378
Blainville	CAQ	CAQ	20,457	48.27%	12,375	29.20%	PLQ	QS	74.56%	20,457	8,082	5,744	6,408	1,146	–	286	254	–	–	42,377
Bonaventure	PQ	PQ	8,416	38.46%	2,830	12.93%	PLQ	CAQ	62.27%	3,502	5,586	8,416	3,282	312	–	–	209	575	–	21,882
Borduas	CAQ	CAQ	20,852	47.78%	11,513	26.38%	PQ	QS	76.41%	20,852	5,012	9,339	6,828	836	290	184	164	–	135	43,640
Bourassa-Sauvé	PLQ	PLQ	11,456	46.16%	5,630	22.69%	CAQ	QS	52.44%	5,826	11,456	2,640	3,469	433	363	219	–	92	319	24,817
Bourget	PQ	CAQ	8,870	27.57%	500	1.55%	PQ	QS	64.92%	8,870	6,074	8,370	7,865	719	–	–	200	–	80	32,178
Brome-Missisquoi	PLQ	CAQ	18,407	44.38%	8,369	20.18%	PLQ	QS	70.75%	18,407	10,038	4,446	7,167	978	–	–	247	–	190	41,473
Chambly	CAQ	CAQ	18,940	50.26%	12,376	32.84%	PQ	QS	75.35%	18,940	4,599	6,564	6,177	683	309	180	–	–	233	37,685
Champlain	PLQ	CAQ	21,154	51.86%	13,544	33.21%	PLQ	QS	70.48%	21,154	7,610	4,928	5,285	789	733	–	–	–	290	40,789
Chapleau	PLQ	CAQ	13,057	40.42%	2,537	7.85%	PLQ	QS	59.78%	13,057	10,520	2,922	5,122	–	497	–	–	–	182	32,300
Charlesbourg	PLQ	CAQ	19,985	48.13%	10,666	25.68%	PLQ	QS	73.37%	19,985	9,319	4,868	5,613	–	1,530	–	–	–	212	41,527
Charlevoix–Côte-de-Beaupré	PLQ	CAQ	15,761	45.37%	7,890	22.71%	PLQ	PQ	68.48%	15,761	7,871	6,012	4,472	–	–	330	292	–	–	34,738
Châteauguay	PLQ	CAQ	12,259	37.06%	1,121	3.39%	PLQ	QS	63.86%	12,259	11,138	4,055	4,236	624	458	310	–	–	–	33,080
Chauveau	CAQ	CAQ	18,424	47.06%	9,627	24.59%	PLQ	QS	70.80%	18,424	8,797	3,603	4,052	613	3,371	286	–	–	–	39,146
Chicoutimi	PQ	CAQ	12,123	39.26%	4,416	14.30%	PQ	PLQ	68.53%	12,123	6,094	7,707	3,977	551	426	–	–	–	–	30,878
Chomedey	PLQ	PLQ	15,982	52.68%	7,968	26.26%	CAQ	PQ	54.02%	8,014	15,982	2,301	2,144	538	1,084	276	–	–	–	30,339
Chutes-de-la-Chaudière	CAQ	CAQ	25,777	59.51%	19,739	45.57%	PLQ	QS	76.63%	25,777	6,038	4,055	4,950	–	1,854	301	341	–	–	43,316
Côte-du-Sud	PLQ	CAQ	17,595	53.64%	10,383	31.66%	PLQ	QS	66.83%	17,595	7,212	3,315	3,560	–	575	–	–	–	542	32,799
D'Arcy-McGee	PLQ	PLQ	19,085	74.32%	17,224	67.07%	QS	CAQ	46.56%	1,643	19,085	657	1,861	837	1,153	368	–	–	77	25,681
Deux-Montagnes	CAQ	CAQ	16,038	47.44%	9,574	28.32%	PQ	QS	71.10%	16,038	4,523	6,464	4,912	722	368	–	322	–	457	33,806
Drummond–Bois-Francs	CAQ	CAQ	19,577	56.30%	14,356	41.28%	QS	PLQ	68.82%	19,577	4,527	4,360	5,221	–	733	–	–	250	106	34,774
Dubuc	PLQ	CAQ	10,535	40.23%	4,676	17.86%	PLQ	PQ	65.85%	10,535	5,859	5,541	3,163	–	645	–	–	–	445	26,188
Duplessis	PQ	PQ	7,023	34.32%	127	0.62%	CAQ	PLQ	55.81%	6,896	3,668	7,023	2,534	–	344	–	–	–	–	20,465
Fabre	PLQ	PLQ	12,147	37.52%	1,607	4.96%	CAQ	PQ	61.23%	10,540	12,147	4,372	3,487	861	688	279	–	–	–	32,374
Gaspé	PQ	PQ	6,003	33.41%	41	0.23%	PLQ	CAQ	60.82%	3,521	5,962	6,003	2,482	–	–	–	–	–	–	17,968
Gatineau	PLQ	CAQ	14,586	41.74%	3,932	11.25%	PLQ	QS	59.78%	14,586	10,654	3,148	4,517	1,271	697	–	–	–	71	34,944
Gouin	QS	QS	17,977	59.14%	13,454	44.26%	PQ	PLQ	69.62%	3,011	3,483	4,523	17,977	1,049	–	–	–	–	356	30,399
Granby	CAQ	CAQ	22,570	62.38%	17,495	48.35%	QS	PLQ	69.82%	22,570	3,881	3,491	5,075	531	358	–	–	–	277	36,183
Groulx	CAQ	CAQ	14,771	40.61%	7,402	20.35%	PLQ	QS	70.25%	14,771	7,369	5,745	6,268	802	368	–	235	812	–	36,370
Hochelaga-Maisonneuve	PQ	QS	13,389	50.05%	7,079	26.46%	PQ	CAQ	63.40%	3,447	2,766	6,310	13,389	–	164	337	117	–	222	26,752
Hull	PLQ	PLQ	10,519	33.76%	2,281	7.32%	CAQ	QS	57.62%	8,238	10,519	4,238	5,764	1,099	454	721	69	–	56	31,158
Huntingdon	PLQ	CAQ	10,893	37.69%	711	2.46%	PLQ	QS	67.60%	10,893	10,182	3,188	3,676	444	396	126	–	–	–	28,905
Iberville	CAQ	CAQ	15,892	47.62%	10,035	30.07%	PQ	QS	70.88%	15,892	4,106	5,857	5,779	631	583	269	–	–	258	33,375
Îles-de-la-Madeleine	PLQ	PQ	2,955	38.65%	15	0.20%	PLQ	QS	72.66%	714	2,940	2,955	1,036	–	–	–	–	–	–	7,645
Jacques-Cartier	PLQ	PLQ	21,133	71.81%	18,389	62.48%	CAQ	PVQ	65.11%	2,744	21,133	815	1,291	1,981	762	555	72	78	–	29,431
Jean-Lesage	PLQ	QS	10,331	34.70%	699	2.35%	CAQ	PLQ	65.78%	9,632	5,335	2,774	10,331	343	520	399	149	–	288	29,771
Jean-Talon	PLQ	PLQ	11,069	32.58%	1,363	4.01%	CAQ	QS	75.16%	9,706	11,069	4,912	6,515	610	620	197	–	236	110	33,975
Jeanne-Mance-Viger	PLQ	PLQ	18,215	66.32%	13,770	50.14%	CAQ	QS	55.27%	4,445	18,215	1,523	2,237	570	391	–	–	–	83	27,464
Johnson	CAQ	CAQ	20,902	52.96%	13,851	35.10%	QS	PQ	67.47%	20,902	4,362	5,194	7,051	745	630	302	280	–	–	39,466
Joliette	PQ	PQ	17,685	46.23%	4,431	11.58%	CAQ	QS	71.93%	13,254	2,620	17,685	3,881	528	–	–	283	–	–	38,251
Jonquière	PQ	PQ	14,887	48.35%	4,890	15.88%	CAQ	PLQ	69.25%	9,997	3,029	14,887	2,242	296	337	–	–	–	–	30,788
Labelle	PQ	CAQ	11,784	36.50%	599	1.86%	PQ	QS	67.20%	11,784	3,524	11,185	4,954	395	265	–	181	–	–	32,288
Lac-Saint-Jean	PQ	CAQ	11,437	39.46%	2,299	7.93%	PQ	QS	68.68%	11,437	3,630	9,138	4,305	–	272	–	–	–	199	28,981
LaFontaine	PLQ	PLQ	14,491	58.80%	9,091	36.89%	CAQ	QS	59.03%	5,400	14,491	2,057	2,181	–	434	–	–	–	80	24,643
La Peltrie	CAQ	CAQ	23,389	57.73%	16,660	41.12%	PLQ	QS	70.77%	23,389	6,729	3,050	4,000	700	1,926	–	266	–	457	40,517
La Pinière	PLQ	PLQ	15,476	47.07%	5,996	18.24%	CAQ	QS	61.09%	9,480	15,476	2,921	3,300	585	435	354	–	329	–	32,880
Laporte	PLQ	PLQ	12,514	35.61%	2,479	7.06%	CAQ	QS	66.29%	10,035	12,514	4,647	6,007	980	475	480	–	–	–	35,138
La Prairie	PLQ	CAQ	14,511	43.14%	6,442	19.15%	PLQ	PQ	74.85%	14,511	8,069	5,290	4,362	694	379	222	–	–	107	33,634
L'Assomption	CAQ	CAQ	18,237	57.03%	12,812	40.06%	QS	PQ	71.95%	18,237	2,558	4,625	5,425	596	175	–	363	–	–	31,979
Laurier-Dorion	PLQ	QS	14,226	47.28%	5,301	17.62%	PLQ	CAQ	63.59%	2,664	8,925	2,344	14,226	530	354	574	60	–	414	30,091
Laval-des-Rapides	PLQ	PLQ	10,637	31.54%	271	0.80%	CAQ	QS	61.68%	10,366	10,637	5,195	5,721	738	361	257	271	–	184	33,730
Laviolette–Saint-Maurice	New	CAQ	16,260	45.41%	8,820	24.63%	PLQ	PQ	63.81%	16,260	7,440	5,611	5,414	–	639	–	444	–	–	35,808
Les Plaines	New	CAQ	13,818	51.22%	7,421	27.51%	PQ	QS	69.05%	13,818	2,160	6,397	3,738	434	293	–	–	–	140	26,980
Lévis	CAQ	CAQ	19,417	57.29%	14,516	42.83%	PLQ	QS	71.40%	19,417	4,901	3,475	3,979	698	931	200	174	–	116	33,891
Lotbinière-Frontenac	PLQ	CAQ	20,360	53.78%	12,618	33.33%	PLQ	QS	69.45%	20,360	7,742	3,591	3,593	655	1,410	–	304	–	200	37,855
Louis-Hébert	PLQ	CAQ	16,248	44.59%	6,548	17.97%	PLQ	PQ	80.52%	16,248	9,700	4,529	4,030	550	841	276	–	244	22	36,440
Marguerite-Bourgeoys	PLQ	PLQ	15,361	53.39%	8,605	29.91%	CAQ	QS	54.80%	6,756	15,361	2,430	3,095	675	–	456	–	–	–	28,773
Marie-Victorin	PQ	PQ	8,952	30.82%	705	2.43%	CAQ	QS	62.91%	8,247	4,418	8,952	6,295	625	–	310	–	–	203	29,050
Marquette	PLQ	PLQ	11,819	42.99%	4,026	14.64%	CAQ	QS	59.61%	7,793	11,819	2,139	3,153	1,111	599	596	150	134	–	27,494
Maskinongé	PLQ	CAQ	13,199	42.42%	4,517	14.52%	PLQ	PQ	71.58%	13,199	8,682	3,987	3,764	609	463	–	206	204	–	31,114
Masson	CAQ	CAQ	17,565	53.05%	11,038	33.34%	PQ	QS	72.86%	17,565	3,606	6,527	4,451	699	263	–	–	–	–	33,111
Matane-Matapédia	PQ	PQ	20,658	69.46%	17,279	58.10%	CAQ	PLQ	65.38%	3,379	3,351	20,658	1,718	358	159	–	118	–	–	29,741
Maurice-Richard	PLQ	PLQ	9,459	29.52%	530	1.65%	QS	CAQ	68.63%	6,330	9,459	6,131	8,929	602	–	216	77	–	304	32,048
Mégantic	PLQ	CAQ	12,593	47.53%	7,336	27.69%	PLQ	QS	69.15%	12,593	5,257	3,325	4,228	809	–	–	281	–	–	26,493
Mercier	QS	QS	15,919	54.50%	10,747	36.79%	PLQ	PQ	65.56%	2,348	5,172	3,542	15,919	1,102	122	738	–	–	267	29,210
Mille-Îles	PLQ	PLQ	10,408	35.82%	1,206	4.15%	CAQ	PQ	66.47%	9,202	10,408	4,378	3,711	822	–	–	–	–	537	29,058
Mirabel	CAQ	CAQ	21,602	54.63%	14,440	36.52%	PQ	QS	70.69%	21,602	3,526	7,162	5,916	688	296	–	–	–	353	39,543
Montarville	CAQ	CAQ	17,368	41.11%	7,070	16.73%	PLQ	PQ	80.37%	17,368	10,298	6,820	6,716	–	–	836	–	–	214	42,252
Montmorency	PLQ	CAQ	20,233	50.87%	12,836	32.27%	PLQ	QS	70.96%	20,233	7,397	4,221	5,225	558	1,507	–	–	561	69	39,771
Mont-Royal–Outremont	New	PLQ	16,026	51.34%	11,206	35.90%	QS	CAQ	55.71%	4,218	16,026	3,672	4,820	1,344	509	548	–	–	79	31,216
Nelligan	PLQ	PLQ	22,421	65.12%	16,510	47.95%	CAQ	QS	59.58%	5,911	22,421	1,580	1,902	1,040	1,038	537	–	–	–	34,429
Nicolet-Bécancour	CAQ	CAQ	15,562	55.29%	11,139	39.57%	PQ	PLQ	71.77%	15,562	3,539	4,423	3,474	403	576	–	–	–	170	28,147
Notre-Dame-de-Grâce	PLQ	PLQ	16,843	62.98%	13,677	51.14%	QS	CAQ	56.14%	2,142	16,843	1,460	3,166	1,785	405	708	–	151	82	26,742
Orford	PLQ	CAQ	12,117	40.05%	4,569	15.10%	PLQ	QS	70.72%	12,117	7,548	3,744	5,406	881	344	–	211	–	–	30,251
Papineau	PLQ	CAQ	16,975	46.93%	8,617	23.82%	PLQ	QS	60.88%	16,975	8,358	3,828	5,434	547	463	–	252	–	311	36,168
Pointe-aux-Trembles	PQ	CAQ	10,579	38.96%	1,834	6.75%	PQ	QS	67.43%	10,579	3,410	8,745	4,036	–	–	–	–	–	386	27,156
Pontiac	PLQ	PLQ	14,869	53.89%	9,237	33.48%	CAQ	QS	53.53%	5,632	14,869	1,520	2,964	919	853	795	–	–	40	27,592
Portneuf	PLQ	CAQ	15,994	54.31%	10,435	35.43%	PLQ	QS	70.31%	15,994	5,559	2,727	3,364	–	1,524	–	282	–	–	29,450
Prévost	New	CAQ	14,876	47.03%	7,137	22.56%	PQ	QS	70.80%	14,876 (Note: Marguerite Blais was previously the Liberal incumbent in Saint-Henri-Sainte-Anne)	4,063	7,739	4,414	–	303	–	–	–	235	31,630
René-Lévesque	PQ	PQ	8,055	42.22%	1,623	8.51%	CAQ	PLQ	58.75%	6,432	2,440	8,055	1,948	–	204	–	–	–	–	19,079
Repentigny	CAQ	CAQ	18,799	49.74%	11,698	30.95%	PQ	QS	74.21%	18,799	5,166	7,101	5,622	441	309	–	357	–	–	37,795
Richelieu	PQ	CAQ	15,258	49.79%	8,196	26.75%	PQ	QS	70.43%	15,258	3,456	7,062	4,101	402	364	–	–	–	–	30,643
Richmond	PLQ	CAQ	17,011	39.64%	8,509	19.83%	PLQ	QS	72.11%	17,011	8,502	7,654	8,110	680	600	–	353	–	–	42,910
Rimouski	PQ	PQ	13,940	43.92%	6,037	19.02%	CAQ	QS	70.25%	7,903	3,914	13,940	5,531	220	–	–	–	123	106	31,737
Rivière-du-Loup–Témiscouata	PLQ	CAQ	13,439	39.18%	1,962	5.72%	PLQ	PQ	69.41%	13,439	11,477	5,230	3,783	–	373	–	–	–	–	34,302
Robert-Baldwin	PLQ	PLQ	22,426	73.85%	18,988	62.53%	CAQ	QS	55.60%	3,438	22,426	994	1,317	781	921	488	–	–	–	30,365
Roberval	PLQ	PLQ	11,807	42.46%	5,088	18.30%	CAQ	PQ	63.39%	6,719	11,807	5,290	2,975	–	478	–	305	–	236	27,810
Rosemont	PQ	QS	12,920	35.25%	2,500	6.82%	PQ	PLQ	69.40%	5,703	6,148	10,420	12,920	521	217	314	–	–	410	36,653
Rousseau	PQ	CAQ	14,464	53.24%	7,304	26.88%	PQ	QS	66.15%	14,464	1,419	7,160	3,531	–	271	–	323	–	–	27,168
Rouyn-Noranda-Témiscamingue	PLQ	QS	9,304	32.08%	506	1.74%	CAQ	PQ	65.60%	8,798	4,753	5,311	9,304	389	253	–	195	–	–	29,003
Sainte-Marie-Saint-Jacques	QS	QS	12,429	49.28%	7,094	28.13%	PLQ	PQ	59.42%	2,773	5,335	3,528	12,429	881	130	–	72	–	73	25,221
Sainte-Rose	PLQ	CAQ	13,491	36.84%	2,462	6.72%	PLQ	PQ	70.01%	13,491	11,029	5,309	5,082	923	423	250	–	–	110	36,617
Saint-François	PLQ	CAQ	13,524	34.73%	4,450	11.43%	PLQ	QS	69.15%	13,524	9,074	6,304	8,833	691	–	–	514	–	–	38,940
Saint-Henri-Sainte-Anne	PLQ	PLQ	11,837	38.06%	4,424	14.22%	QS	CAQ	56.61%	5,809	11,837	3,568	7,413	1,009	380	690	–	–	396	31,102
Saint-Hyacinthe	CAQ	CAQ	21,227	52.00%	14,401	35.28%	QS	PQ	71.46%	21,227	5,758	6,524	6,826	–	–	486	–	–	–	40,821
Saint-Jean	PQ	CAQ	16,789	39.50%	3,618	8.51%	PQ	QS	71.28%	16,789	4,946	13,171	6,137	694	368	159	240	–	–	42,504
Saint-Jérôme	PQ	CAQ	17,225	43.74%	6,425	16.31%	PQ	QS	65.87%	17,225	3,534	10,800	6,243	677	345	141	294	–	123	39,382
Saint-Laurent	PLQ	PLQ	17,669	61.97%	13,347	46.81%	CAQ	QS	50.96%	4,322	17,669	1,846	2,458	849	863	432	–	–	75	28,514
Sanguinet	PQ	CAQ	12,986	43.54%	5,597	18.77%	PQ	QS	72.45%	12,986	4,169	7,389	4,390	456	355	–	–	–	81	29,826
Sherbrooke	PLQ	QS	12,315	34.27%	3,450	9.60%	PLQ	CAQ	71.51%	8,403	8,865	5,244	12,315	423	–	141	162	156	223	35,932
Soulanges	PLQ	CAQ	15,307	39.23%	2,142	5.49%	PLQ	QS	70.33%	15,307	13,165	4,001	4,508	729	322	424	292	–	270	39,018
Taillon	PQ	CAQ	12,186	33.76%	2,048	5.67%	PQ	QS	69.12%	12,186	6,042	10,138	6,382	766	235	349	–	–	–	36,098
Taschereau	PQ	QS	15,373	42.52%	8,511	23.54%	CAQ	PLQ	73.74%	6,862	6,387	6,379	15,373	534	–	196	152	–	274	36,157
Terrebonne	PQ	CAQ	17,638	42.97%	5,532	13.48%	PQ	QS	72.34%	17,638	4,976	12,106	5,279	522	287	–	244	–	–	41,052
Trois-Rivières	PLQ	CAQ	15,323	41.07%	6,801	18.23%	PLQ	QS	70.22%	15,323	8,522	5,758	6,411	653	639	–	–	–	–	37,306
Ungava	PLQ	CAQ	2,270	26.51%	46	0.54%	PQ	PLQ	30.89%	2,270	2,134	2,224	1,416	183	192	145	–	–	–	8,564
Vachon	PQ	CAQ	15,625	43.61%	8,089	22.58%	PLQ	PQ	70.86%	15,625	7,536	6,106	5,194	–	436	453	200	–	278	35,828
Vanier-Les Rivières	PLQ	CAQ	18,267	45.10%	7,916	19.55%	PLQ	QS	71.82%	18,267	10,351	4,028	4,946	668	1,454	–	242	299	245	40,500
Vaudreuil	PLQ	PLQ	15,143	39.92%	2,765	7.29%	CAQ	PQ	65.70%	12,378	15,143	3,813	3,811	1,026	644	568	343	–	206	37,932
Verchères	PQ	CAQ	17,073	37.49%	827	1.82%	PQ	QS	77.38%	17,073	4,017	16,246	6,723	701	380	403	–	–	–	45,543
Verdun	PLQ	PLQ	11,054	35.51%	3,597	11.55%	QS	CAQ	63.19%	6,343	11,054	3,929	7,457	1,157	217	717	–	–	256	31,130
Viau	PLQ	PLQ	10,113	46.63%	4,837	22.30%	QS	CAQ	53.44%	3,411	10,113	1,803	5,276	–	274	494	–	153	162	21,686
Vimont	PLQ	PLQ	11,474	36.69%	567	1.81%	CAQ	PQ	69.15%	10,907	11,474	3,875	3,602	652	291	230	131	115	–	31,277
Westmount-Saint-Louis	PLQ	PLQ	14,547	66.71%	12,311	56.46%	QS	CAQ	48.47%	2,110	14,547	1,105	2,236	730	479	598	–	–	–	21,805

= open seat
= turnout is above provincial average
= winning candidate was in previous Legislature
= incumbent had switched allegiance
= previously incumbent in another riding
= not incumbent; was previously elected to the Legislature
= incumbency arose from byelection gain
= other incumbents renominated
= previously an MP in the House of Commons of Canada
= multiple candidates

=== Comparative analysis for ridings (2018 vs 2014) ===
Summary of riding results by turnout and vote share for winning candidate (vs 2014)
Riding and winning party			Turnout		Vote share	
Riding and winning party			%	Change (pp)	%	Change (pp)
Abitibi-Est	CAQ	Gain	63.79	0.91	42.72	23.68
Abitibi-Ouest	CAQ	Gain	64.75	1.40	34.12	20.07
Acadie	PLQ	Hold	54.17	-15.53	53.80	-17.16
Anjou–Louis-Riel	PLQ	Hold	64.49	-8.80	39.06	-11.75
Argenteuil	CAQ	Gain	65.33	-3.60	38.88	15.25
Arthabaska	CAQ	Hold	69.49	-3.78	61.84	16.35
Beauce-Nord	CAQ	Hold	70.79	-3.19	66.37	15.48
Beauce-Sud	CAQ	Gain	69.13	-1.67	62.68	24.46
Beauharnois	CAQ	Gain	68.62	0.66	46.70	23.73
Bellechasse	CAQ	Gain	70.10	-5.13	53.85	20.67
Berthier	CAQ	Gain	69.84	0.98	45.13	14.09
Bertrand	CAQ	Gain	67.60	-3.50	41.55	14.62
Blainville	CAQ	Hold	74.56	-2.29	48.27	14.36
Bonaventure	PQ	Hold	62.27	-7.17	38.46	-7.24
Borduas	CAQ	Hold	76.41	-0.38	47.78	14.28
Bourassa-Sauvé	PLQ	Hold	52.44	-10.69	46.16	-14.32
Bourget	CAQ	Gain	64.92	-3.44	27.57	7.93
Brome-Missisquoi	CAQ	Gain	70.75	-2.38	44.38	16.49
Chambly	CAQ	Hold	75.35	-1.27	50.26	16.02
Champlain	CAQ	Gain	70.48	-1.75	51.86	21.43
Chapleau	CAQ	Gain	59.78	-3.19	40.42	25.68
Charlesbourg	CAQ	Gain	73.37	-3.57	48.13	15.70
Charlevoix–Côte-de-Beaupré	CAQ	Gain	68.48	-5.00	45.37	19.29
Châteauguay	CAQ	Gain	63.86	-8.70	37.06	16.81
Chauveau	CAQ	Hold	70.80	-5.22	47.06	-5.35
Chicoutimi	CAQ	Gain	68.53	-2.04	39.26	21.81
Chomedey	PLQ	Hold	54.02	-18.27	52.68	-20.35
Chutes-de-la-Chaudière	CAQ	Hold	76.63	-4.43	59.51	11.80
Côte-du-Sud	CAQ	Gain	66.83	-2.75	53.64	30.37
D'Arcy-McGee	PLQ	Hold	46.56	-25.50	74.32	-17.84
Deux-Montagnes	CAQ	Hold	71.10	-3.35	47.44	13.28
Drummond–Bois-Francs	CAQ	Hold	68.82	-0.41	56.30	16.38
Dubuc	CAQ	Gain	65.85	-4.63	40.23	21.35
Duplessis	PQ	Hold	55.81	-2.86	34.32	-5.67
Fabre	PLQ	Hold	61.23	-16.00	37.52	-17.62
Gaspé	PQ	Hold	60.82	-2.32	33.41	-18.63
Gatineau	CAQ	Gain	59.78	-5.38	41.74	27.73
Gouin	QS	Hold	69.62	-3.56	59.14	8.16
Granby	CAQ	Hold	69.82	0.31	62.38	9.33
Groulx	CAQ	Hold	70.25	-3.23	40.61	9.76
Hochelaga-Maisonneuve	QS	Gain	63.40	-0.29	50.05	19.48
Hull	PLQ	Hold	57.62	-6.22	33.76	-21.41
Huntingdon	CAQ	Gain	67.60	-2.52	37.69	14.03
Iberville	CAQ	Hold	70.88	-0.12	47.62	13.39
Îles-de-la-Madeleine	PQ	Gain	72.66	-4.35	38.65	-1.51
Jacques-Cartier	PLQ	Hold	65.11	-16.07	71.81	-13.62
Jean-Lesage	QS	Gain	65.78	-2.13	34.70	23.10
Jean-Talon	PLQ	Hold	75.16	-2.78	32.58	-11.92
Jeanne-Mance-Viger	PLQ	Hold	55.27	-15.82	66.32	-12.21
Johnson	CAQ	Hold	67.47	0.03	52.96	16.90
Joliette	PQ	Hold	71.93	2.08	46.23	1.90
Jonquière	PQ	Hold	69.25	-0.26	48.35	4.84
L'Assomption	CAQ	Hold	71.95	-1.43	57.03	7.65
La Peltrie	CAQ	Hold	70.77	-6.38	57.73	7.40
La Pinière	PLQ	Hold	61.09	-13.68	47.07	-11.22
La Prairie	CAQ	Gain	74.85	-3.42	43.14	10.52
Labelle	CAQ	Gain	67.20	1.85	36.50	15.41
Lac-Saint-Jean	CAQ	Gain	68.68	-1.16	39.46	21.15
LaFontaine	PLQ	Hold	59.03	-15.35	58.80	-14.46
Laporte	PLQ	Hold	66.29	-6.75	35.61	-12.04
Laurier-Dorion	QS	Gain	63.59	-9.01	47.28	19.59
Laval-des-Rapides	PLQ	Hold	61.68	-9.23	31.54	-12.67
Laviolette–Saint-Maurice	CAQ	New	63.81	New	45.41	New
Les Plaines	CAQ	New	69.05	New	51.22	New
Lévis	CAQ	Hold	71.40	-4.03	57.29	16.80
Lotbinière-Frontenac	CAQ	Gain	69.45	-4.12	53.78	24.01
Louis-Hébert	CAQ	Gain	80.52	-3.14	44.59	18.67
Marguerite-Bourgeoys	PLQ	Hold	54.80	-17.54	53.39	-16.70
Marie-Victorin	PQ	Hold	62.91	-3.41	30.82	-7.35
Marquette	PLQ	Hold	59.61	-11.54	42.99	-19.52
Maskinongé	CAQ	Gain	71.58	-2.24	42.42	14.13
Masson	CAQ	Hold	72.86	3.35	53.05	14.70
Matane-Matapédia	PQ	Hold	65.38	2.18	69.46	8.30
Maurice-Richard	PLQ	Hold	68.63	-6.37	29.52	-9.48
Mégantic	CAQ	Gain	69.15	-0.70	47.53	24.66
Mercier	QS	Hold	65.56	-6.84	54.50	8.31
Mille-Îles	PLQ	Hold	66.47	-10.83	35.82	-14.68
Mirabel	CAQ	Hold	70.69	0.21	54.63	15.39
Mont-Royal–Outremont	PLQ	New	55.71	New	51.34	New
Montarville	CAQ	Hold	80.37	-2.80	41.11	6.07
Montmorency	CAQ	Gain	70.96	-5.56	50.87	17.04
Nelligan	PLQ	Hold	59.58	-19.03	65.12	-15.22
Nicolet-Bécancour	CAQ	Hold	71.77	-2.43	55.29	16.64
Notre-Dame-de-Grâce	PLQ	Hold	56.14	-16.36	62.98	-13.63
Orford	CAQ	Gain	70.72	-2.10	40.05	19.03
Papineau	CAQ	Gain	60.88	-2.67	46.93	30.84
Pointe-aux-Trembles	CAQ	Gain	67.43	-2.00	38.96	14.89
Pontiac	PLQ	Hold	53.53	-14.71	53.89	-21.87
Portneuf	CAQ	Gain	70.31	-5.40	54.31	16.32
Prévost	CAQ	New	70.80	New	47.03	New
René-Lévesque	PQ	Hold	58.75	-0.61	42.22	-12.79
Repentigny	CAQ	Hold	74.21	-1.81	49.74	13.67
Richelieu	CAQ	Gain	70.43	0.85	49.79	22.98
Richmond	CAQ	Gain	72.11	-0.50	39.64	17.61
Rimouski	PQ	Hold	70.25	2.98	43.92	3.34
Rivière-du-Loup–Témiscouata	CAQ	Gain	69.41	-0.59	39.18	22.62
Robert-Baldwin	PLQ	Hold	55.60	-21.39	73.85	-13.42
Roberval	PLQ	Hold	63.39	-8.90	42.46	-12.72
Rosemont	QS	Gain	69.40	-3.27	35.25	16.57
Rousseau	CAQ	Gain	66.15	1.68	53.24	16.54
Rouyn-Noranda-Témiscamingue	QS	Gain	65.60	1.35	32.08	20.52
Saint-François	CAQ	Gain	69.15	-1.00	34.73	17.64
Saint-Henri-Sainte-Anne	PLQ	Hold	56.61	-11.68	38.06	-14.46
Saint-Hyacinthe	CAQ	Hold	71.46	-0.12	52.00	19.26
Saint-Jean	CAQ	Gain	71.28	-0.39	39.50	8.42
Saint-Jérôme	CAQ	Gain	65.87	-1.38	43.74	12.22
Saint-Laurent	PLQ	Hold	50.96	-19.32	61.97	-20.32
Sainte-Marie-Saint-Jacques	QS	Hold	59.42	-6.54	49.28	18.68
Sainte-Rose	CAQ	Gain	70.01	-8.22	36.84	12.80
Sanguinet	CAQ	Gain	72.45	-1.70	43.54	11.77
Sherbrooke	QS	Gain	71.51	1.58	34.27	21.34
Soulanges	CAQ	Gain	70.33	-4.60	39.23	New (Note: There was no CAQ candidate in the previous election.)
Taillon	CAQ	Gain	69.12	-1.67	33.76	9.54
Taschereau	QS	Gain	73.74	0.33	42.52	27.23
Terrebonne	CAQ	Gain	72.34	-1.86	42.97	8.60
Trois-Rivières	CAQ	Gain	70.22	0.77	41.07	18.79
Ungava	CAQ	Gain	30.89	-10.58	26.51	9.99
Vachon	CAQ	Gain	70.86	-4.12	43.61	18.33
Vanier-Les Rivières	CAQ	Gain	71.82	-3.87	45.10	10.62
Vaudreuil	PLQ	Hold	65.70	-12.29	39.92	-21.27
Verchères	CAQ	Gain	77.38	0.42	37.49	7.14
Verdun	PLQ	Hold	63.19	-7.50	35.51	-15.08
Viau	PLQ	Hold	53.44	-9.89	46.63	-15.39
Vimont	PLQ	Hold	69.15	-9.33	36.69	-13.79
Westmount-Saint-Louis	PLQ	Hold	48.47	-13.56	66.71	-16.49

== See also ==
- 41st Quebec Legislature
- Politics of Quebec
- Timeline of Quebec history
- List of political parties in Quebec
