= 2025 Québec solidaire co-spokesperson election =

- November 8, 2025
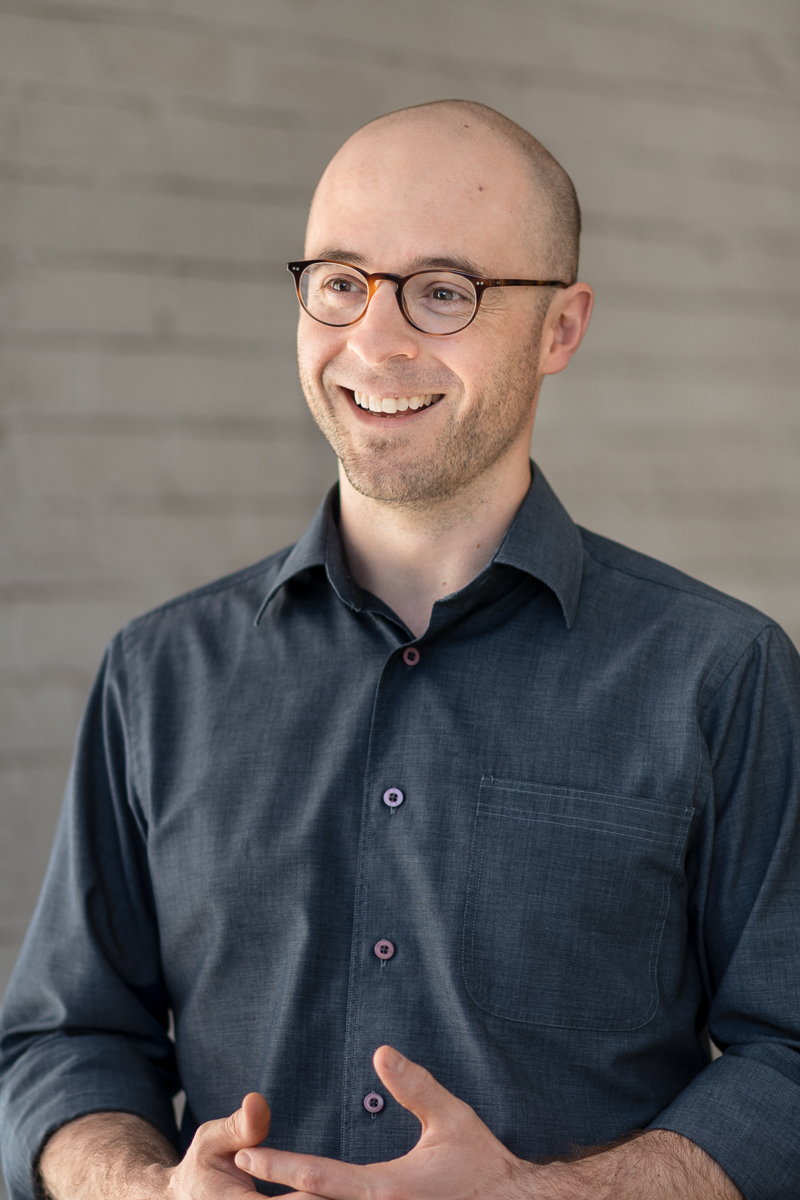

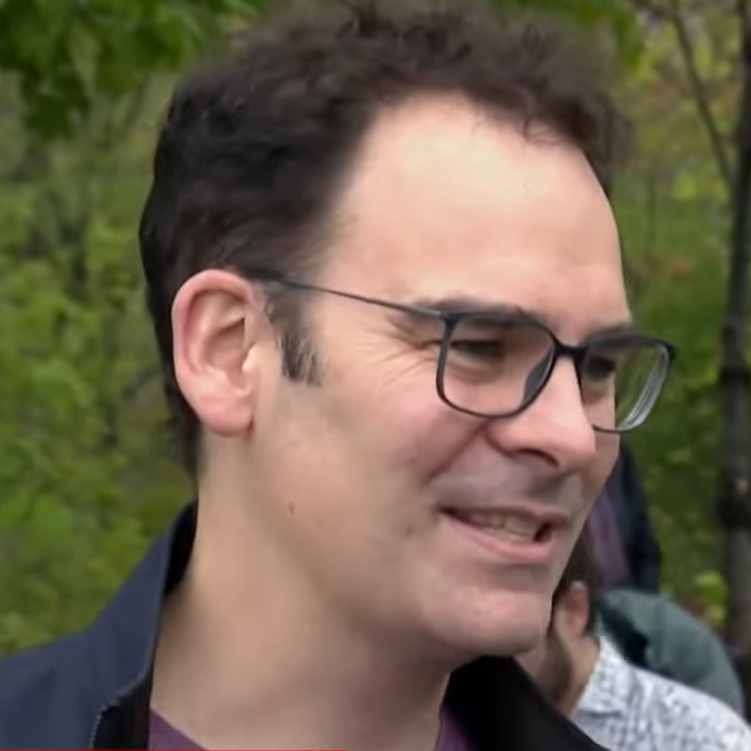
			YB
Candidate	Sol Zanetti	Étienne Grandmont	Yv Bonnier-Viger
First ballot	50.41%	37.96%	9.24%
Co-spokespersons before election
Ruba Ghazal
Guillaume Cliche-Rivard (interim)
Co-spokespersons after election
Ruba Ghazal
Sol Zanetti

2025 Québec solidaire leadership election
- Date: November 8, 2025
- Convention: Centre des congrès de Québec, Quebec City
- Resigning leader: Gabriel Nadeau-Dubois
- Won by: Sol Zanetti
- Ballots: 1
- Candidates: 3
- Entrance fee: $10,000

Québec solidaire held a co-spokesperson election in 2025 after the resignation of Gabriel Nadeau-Dubois from the position.

== Background ==
Under Québec solidaire's constitution, the party is de facto led by two co-spokespersons; it was required that one of the co-spokespersons be female and the other male. However, the constitution was amended to remove the requirement that one co-leader be male.

Nominations for the election opened on 15 August and closed on 14 September. The application must contain 500 valid signatures and a $10,000 entry fee. The result was announced on 8 November, at the party's convention. A forum for the candidates was held on 5 October, and the last day to become a member to vote was 9 October.

== Candidates ==
=== Approved ===
- Yv Bonnier-Viger, former Regional Director of Public Health for Gaspésie-Îles-de-la-Madeleine
- Étienne Grandmont, MNA for Taschereau since 2022
- Sol Zanetti, MNA for Jean-Lesage since 2018

=== Failed to qualify ===
- Geru Schneider, activist

=== Declined ===
- Guillaume Cliche-Rivard, interim co-spokesperson and MNA for Saint-Henri–Sainte-Anne since 2023
- Alexandre Leduc, MNA for Hochelaga-Maisonneuve since 2018

== Results ==
2025 Québec solidaire co-spokesperson electionPoint allocation by ballot
Candidate	Ballot 1
Name	Points
Sol Zanetti	50.41%
Étienne Grandmont	37.96%
Yv Bonnier-Viger	9.24%
Vacancy	1.47%
Abstain	0.92%
Total	100.00%
