= Gertrude Bourdon =

Canadian health professional and politician

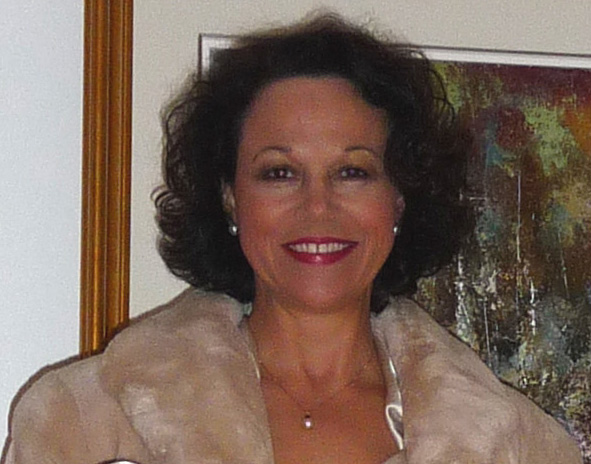
- Bourdon in 2010

Personal details
- Party: Quebec Liberal Party
- Occupation: Health professional and politician

Gertrude Bourdon (born c. 1955) is a Canadian health professional and politician.

Bourdon was educated at the Polyvalente de Saint-Prosper and the Cégep Limoilou. She went on to study nursing at the Université Laval and public administration at the École nationale d'administration publique. In 2009, she was named director general for the Centre hospitalier universitaire de Québec (CHUQ). In 2012, she was responsible for the union of the Centre hospitalier affilié universitaire de Québec with the CHUQ. She then became president/director-general of the amalgamated network of hospitals. She resigned her position in August 2018 to run for political office. Bourdon was recognized as one of Canada's Top 100 most influential women by the Women's Executive Network in 2014. In 2016, she was named to the Académie des Grands Québécois by the Chambre de commerce et d'industrie de Québec. She was awarded the Prix Rachel-Bureau by the Ordre régional des infirmières et infirmiers de Québec. In 2018, she was named an Officer in the Order of Canada.

Following her resignation, Bourdon announced that she would run as a Quebec Liberal Party candidate in the riding of Jean-Lesage in the 2018 Quebec general election. She had already refused an offer to run as a candidate for the Coalition Avenir Québec. It was announced that she would become Minister of Health if the Liberals formed the next government in Quebec. On 1 October 2018, Bourdon lost her election (5,305 votes) to Sol Zanetti (QS 10,304) where she came in third place behind Christiane Gamache (CAQ- 9,635)

== Electoral records ==
Quebec provincial by-election, December 2, 2019 On the resignation of Sébastien Proulx
Party	Candidate	Votes	%	±%
Coalition Avenir Québec	Joëlle Boutin	9,950	43.38	+14.81
Liberal	Gertrude Bourdon	5,742	25.03	-7.54
Québec solidaire	Olivier Bolduc	3,888	16.95	-2.22
Parti Québécois	Sylvain Barrette	2,137	9.32	-5.14
Green	Émilie Coulombe	640	2.79	+0.99
Conservative	Éric Barnabé	233	1.02	-0.81
Independent	Ali Dahan	206	0.90	+0.20
Citoyens au pouvoir	Stéphane Blais	85	0.37	-
Indépendance du Québec	Michel Blondin	32	0.14	-
Équipe Autonomiste	Stéphane Pouleur	23	0.10	-0.48
Total valid votes		22,936	99.53	
Total rejected ballots		109	0.47	-0.71
Turnout		23,045	49.18	-25.98
Electors on the lists		46,857	–	
Coalition Avenir Québec gain from Liberal		Swing		+11.18

2018 Quebec general election
Party	Candidate	Votes	%	±%
Québec solidaire	Sol Zanetti	10,304	34.68	+20.58
Coalition Avenir Québec	Christiane Gamache	9,635	32.43	+8.65
Liberal	Gertrude Bourdon	5,305	17.86	-19.41
Parti Québécois	Claire Vignola	2,764	9.30	-13.10
Conservative	Anne Deblois	520	1.75	+0.96
New Democratic	Raymond Côté	399	1.34	New
Green	Alex Paradis-Bellefeuille	342	1.15	New
Parti nul	Charles Verreault-Lemieux	192	0.65	-0.58
Citoyens au pouvoir	Marie-Pierre Deschênes	153	0.51	New
Équipe Autonomiste	Nicolas Bouffard-Savoie	52	0.18	New
Marxist–Leninist	Claude Moreau	44	0.15	+0.01
Total valid votes		29,710	100.0	
Total rejected ballots				
Turnout				
Eligible voters				
Québec solidaire gain from Liberal		Swing		–
