= Sol Zanetti =

Canadian politician (born 1982)

Sol Zanetti MNA
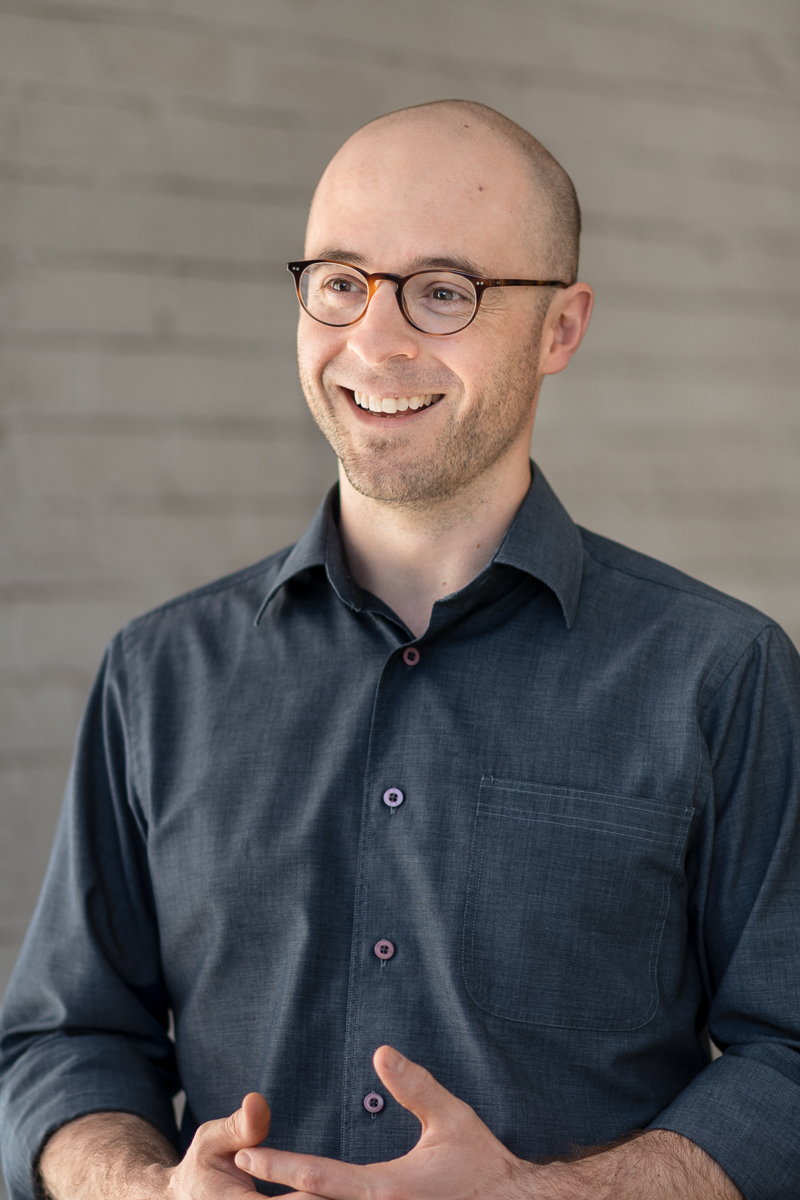
- Sol Zanetti in 2018

Co-Spokesperson for Québec Solidaire
- Incumbent
- Assumed office November 8, 2025 Serving with Ruba Ghazal
- Preceded by: Guillaume Cliche-Rivard (interim)

Member of the National Assembly of Quebec for Jean-Lesage
- Incumbent
- Assumed office October 1, 2018
- Preceded by: André Drolet

Leader of Option nationale
- In office October 26, 2013 – January 1, 2018
- Preceded by: Jean-Martin Aussant

Personal details
- Born: August 11, 1982 (age 44) Sainte-Foy, Quebec, Canada
- Party: Québec solidaire (2018–present)
- Other political affiliations: Option nationale (2012–2018)

Sol Zanetti (born 1982) is a Canadian politician, who was elected to the National Assembly of Quebec in the 2018 provincial election. He represents the electoral district of Jean-Lesage as a member of Québec solidaire.

Following his win in the 2022 provincial election, he was chosen as its critic for Sovereignty, Canadian Relations, Democratic Institutions, Access to Information and Protection of Personal Information, and the Family.

He was previously the leader of Option nationale, a Quebec sovereigntist political party, from 2013 to 2018.

A candidate for the party in the 2012 provincial election, Zanetti won the party's leadership on October 26, 2013, winning 67 per cent of the leadership vote against musician and activist Nic Payne. He led the party into the 2014 provincial election.

In September 2014, Zanetti published a video on YouTube encouraging voters in the Scottish independence referendum to vote yes.

The party merged with Québec solidaire in 2018 and became a collective within the latter party. He was elected co-spokesperson of the party in 2025, winning on the first ballot.

He is of Italian and Canadian descent.

== Electoral record ==
2022 Quebec general election: Jean-Lesage
Party	Candidate	Votes	%	±%
Québec solidaire	Sol Zanetti	11,390	37.77	+3.07
Coalition Avenir Québec	Christiane Gamache	9,426	31.26	-1.09
Conservative	Denise Peter	4,258	14.12	+12.37
Parti Québécois	Michaël Potvin	3,337	11.07	+1.75
Liberal	Charles Robert	1,326	4.40	-13.52
Green	Félix-Antoine Bérubé-Simard	237	0.79	-0.36
Climat Québec	Mario Ledoux	67	0.22	–
Marxist–Leninist	Claude Moreau	57	0.19	+0.04
Démocratie directe	Lucie Perreault	56	0.19	–
Total valid votes		30.154	98.63	
Total rejected ballots		419	1.37	
Turnout		30,573	67.34	
Electors on the lists		45,399	–	–

2018 Quebec general election: Jean-Lesage
Party	Candidate	Votes	%	±%
Québec solidaire	Sol Zanetti	10,331	34.7	+20.58
Coalition Avenir Québec	Christiane Gamache	9,632	32.35	+8.65
Liberal	Gertrude Bourdon	5,335	17.92	-19.41
Parti Québécois	Claire Vignola	2,774	9.32	-13.1
Conservative	Anne Deblois	520	1.75	+0.96
New Democratic	Raymond Côté	399	1.34	
Green	Alex Paradis-Bellefeuille	343	1.15	
Parti nul	Charles Verreault-Lemieux	192	0.64	-0.58
Citoyens au pouvoir	Marie-Pierre Deschênes	149	0.5	
Équipe Autonomiste	Nicolas Bouffard-Savoie	52	0.17	
Marxist–Leninist	Claude Moreau	44	0.15	+0.01
Total valid votes		29,771	98.19	
Total rejected ballots		548	1.81	
Turnout		30,319	65.78	
Eligible voters		46,090		
Québec solidaire gain from Liberal		Swing		+5.97
Source(s) "Rapport des résultats officiels du scrutin". Élections Québec.

Quebec provincial by-election, June 8, 2015: Jean-Talon
Party	Candidate	Votes	%	±%
Liberal	Sébastien Proulx	8,214	41.76	-2.74
Parti Québécois	Clément Laberge	5,894	29.97	+7.49
Coalition Avenir Québec	Alain Fecteau	2,717	13.81	-6.75
Québec solidaire	Amélie Boisvert	1,503	7.64	-1.41
Option nationale	Sol Zanetti	474	2.41	+0.90
Green	Elodie Boisjoly-Dubreuil	472	2.4	–
Conservative	Sylvain Rancourt	237	1.20	+0.61
Parti des sans Parti	Sylvain Drolet	76	0.39	–
Équipe Autonomiste	Stéphane Pouleur	55	0.28	+0.09
Parti indépendantiste	Grégoire Bonneau-Fortier	27	0.14	–
Total valid votes		19,668	99.18	
Total rejected ballots		162	0.82	
Turnout		19,830	43.61	-34.39
Electors on the lists		45,475	–	
Liberal hold		Swing		-5.12

Quebec provincial by-election, March 9, 2015: Richelieu
Party	Candidate	Votes	%	±%
Parti Québécois	Sylvain Rochon	7,294	35.98	-3.04
Coalition Avenir Québec	Jean-Bernard Émond	6,584	32.48	+5.66
Liberal	Benoît Théroux	5,054	24.93	-0.72
Québec solidaire	Marie-Ève Mathieu	541	2.67	-2.63
Option nationale	Sol Zanetti	316	1.56	+0.21
Green	Vincent Pouliot	352	1.74	+0.58
Conservative	Daniel Gaudreau	103	0.51	-0.21
Équipe Autonomiste	Louis Chandonnet	30	0.15	
Total valid votes		20,274	98.45	+1.00
Total rejected ballots		319	1.55	-1.00
Turnout		20,593	46.43	-23.57
Electors on the lists		44,356	–	–
Parti Québécois hold		Swing		-4.35

2014 Quebec general election: Jean-Lesage
Party	Candidate	Votes	%
Liberal	André Drolet	11,645	37.27
Coalition Avenir Québec	Émilie Foster	7,431	23.78
Parti Québécois	Pierre Châteauvert	6,998	22.40
Québec solidaire	Sébastien Bouchard	3,626	11.60
Option nationale	Sol Zanetti	782	2.50
Parti nul	Sébastien Dumais	384	1.23
Conservative	Andréas Garcia	77	0.24
Independent	José Breton	93	0.30
Marxist–Leninist	Claude Moreau	43	0.14
Total valid votes		31,248	98.65
Total rejected ballots		427	1.35
Turnout		31,675	68.00
Electors on the lists		46,643	–

2012 Quebec general election: Louis-Hébert
Party	Candidate	Votes	%	±%
Liberal	Sam Hamad	14,602	38.42	-10.43
Coalition Avenir Québec	Michel Hamel	12,510	32.92	+16.67*
Parti Québécois	Rosette Côté	8,127	21.38	-7.71
Québec solidaire	Guillaume Boivin	1,359	3.58	+0.73
Option nationale	Sol Zanetti	706	1.86	–
Parti nul	Julie Lachance	226	0.59	–
Coalition pour la constituante	Guillaume Dion	209	0.55	–
Conservative	Véronique Durand	146	0.38	–
Équipe Autonomiste	Hugues Fortin	70	0.18	–
Quebec Citizens' Union	Maxime Guérin	49	0.13	–
Total valid votes		38,004	99.18	–
Total rejected ballots		316	0.82	–
Turnout		38,320	86.57	+16.22
Electors on the lists		44,263	–	–
