= André Drolet =

Canadian politician

Member of the National Assembly of Quebec for Jean-Lesage
- In office December 8, 2008 – August 29, 2018
- Preceded by: Jean-François Gosselin
- Succeeded by: Sol Zanetti

Personal details
- Born: June 1, 1954 (age 71) Quebec City, Quebec, Canada
- Party: Liberal
- Spouse: Ginette Bilodeau

André Drolet (born 1 June 1954) is a Canadian politician. Drolet was elected to represent the riding of Jean-Lesage in the National Assembly of Quebec in the 2008 provincial election. He is a member of the Quebec Liberal Party.

Prior to his election, Drolet worked for over 25 years in the field of sales public relations including for O'Keefe and Groupe Michel Cadrin. He is also the owners of several small businesses including a golf course and a well-known local restaurant in the Quebec City area.
