= Jean-Lesage =

Provincial electoral district in Quebec, Canada

Coordinates: 46°50′30″N 71°13′0″W

Quebec electoral district
- Location in Quebec

Provincial electoral district
- Legislature: National Assembly of Quebec
MNA
Sol Zanetti
Québec solidaire
- District created: 2001
- First contested: 2003
- Last contested: 2026

Demographics
- Electors (2014): 46,643
- Area (km²): 25.0
- Census division: Quebec City (part)
- Census subdivision: Quebec City (part)

Jean-Lesage (French pronunciation: [ʒɑ̃ ləsaʒ]) is a provincial electoral district in the Capitale-Nationale region of Quebec, Canada, which elects a member to the National Assembly of Quebec. It consists of parts of the Beauport and La Cité-Limoilou boroughs of Quebec City.

It was created for the 2003 election from most of the former Limoilou and part of Montmorency electoral districts. Even earlier, before Limoilou, the electoral district of Québec-Est existed in the same general area. In the change from the 2001 to the 2011 electoral map, it lost some territory to Montmorency but gained some territory from Taschereau; it also gained a tiny amount of territory from Charlesbourg.

It is named after former Quebec Premier Jean Lesage who orchestrated the Quiet Revolution from 1960 to 1966.

== Members of the National Assembly ==
Legislature	Years	Member	Party
Riding created from Limoilou and Montmorency
37th	2003–2007	Michel Després	Liberal
38th	2007–2008	Jean-François Gosselin	Action démocratique
39th	2008–2012	André Drolet	Liberal
40th	2012–2014	André Drolet	Liberal
41st	2014–2018	André Drolet	Liberal
42nd	2018–2022	Sol Zanetti	Québec solidaire
43rd	2022–2026	Sol Zanetti	Québec solidaire
44th	2026–Present	Sol Zanetti	Québec solidaire

== Election results ==
2026 Quebec general election
The 2026 general election will be held on October 5.
Party	Candidate	Votes	%	±%
Québec solidaire	Sol Zanetti	10,847	35.67	
Conservative	Nancy Joannette	7,190	23.65	
Parti Québécois	Claude Villeneuve	6,412	21.09	
Coalition Avenir Québec	Nathalie St-Pierre	2,845	9.36	
Liberal	Gertrude Bourdon	2,754	9.06	
Parti nul	Geneviève Dorval	170	0.56	
Climat Québec	Mario Ledoux	92	0.30	
Marxist–Leninist	Claude Moreau	62	0.20	
Équipe Autonomiste	Nicolas Thériault	35	0.12	
Total valid votes				
Total rejected ballots				
Turnout			69.11	
Electors on the lists				

2022 Quebec general election
Party	Candidate	Votes	%	±%
Québec solidaire	Sol Zanetti	11,390	37.77	+3.07
Coalition Avenir Québec	Christiane Gamache	9,426	31.26	-1.09
Conservative	Denise Peter	4,258	14.12	+12.37
Parti Québécois	Michaël Potvin	3,337	11.07	+1.75
Liberal	Charles Robert	1,326	4.40	-13.52
Green	Félix-Antoine Bérubé-Simard	237	0.79	-0.36
Climat Québec	Mario Ledoux	67	0.22	–
Marxist–Leninist	Claude Moreau	57	0.19	+0.04
Démocratie directe	Lucie Perreault	56	0.19	–
Total valid votes		30.154	98.63	
Total rejected ballots		419	1.37	
Turnout		30,573	67.34	
Electors on the lists		45,399	–	–

2018 Quebec general election
Party	Candidate	Votes	%	±%
Québec solidaire	Sol Zanetti	10,331	34.7	+20.58
Coalition Avenir Québec	Christiane Gamache	9,632	32.35	+8.65
Liberal	Gertrude Bourdon	5,335	17.92	-19.41
Parti Québécois	Claire Vignola	2,774	9.32	-13.1
Conservative	Anne Deblois	520	1.75	+0.96
New Democratic	Raymond Côté	399	1.34	
Green	Alex Paradis-Bellefeuille	343	1.15	
Parti nul	Charles Verreault-Lemieux	192	0.64	-0.58
Citoyens au pouvoir	Marie-Pierre Deschênes	149	0.5	
Équipe Autonomiste	Nicolas Bouffard-Savoie	52	0.17	
Marxist–Leninist	Claude Moreau	44	0.15	+0.01
Total valid votes		29,771	98.19	
Total rejected ballots		548	1.81	
Turnout		30,319	65.78	
Eligible voters		46,090		
Québec solidaire gain from Liberal		Swing		+5.97
Source(s) "Rapport des résultats officiels du scrutin". Élections Québec.

2014 Quebec general election
Party	Candidate	Votes	%	±%
Liberal	André Drolet	11,645	37.27	+6.66
Coalition Avenir Québec	Émilie Foster	7,431	23.78	-3.53
Parti Québécois	Pierre Châteauvert	6,998	22.40	-6.21
Québec solidaire	Sébastien Bouchard	3,626	11.60	+3.63
Option nationale	Sol Zanetti	782	2.50	-1.46
Parti nul	Sébastien Dumais	384	1.23	
Conservative	Andréas Garcia	246	0.79	
Independent	José Breton	93	0.30	
Marxist–Leninist	Claude Moreau	43	0.14	-0.06
Total valid votes		31,248	98.65	
Total rejected ballots		427	1.35	-0.09
Turnout		31,675	67.91	-3.22
Electors on the lists		46,643	–	
Liberal hold		Swing		+5.10

2012 Quebec general election
Party	Candidate	Votes	%	±%
Liberal	André Drolet	9,965	30.60	-7.67
Parti Québécois	Pierre Châteauvert	9,314	28.60	-2.35
Coalition Avenir Québec	Johanne Lapointe	8,894	27.31	+4.10
Québec solidaire	Élaine Hémond	2,598	7.98	+2.25
Option nationale	Christian St-Pierre	1,289	3.96	
Independent	Debelle Michel	222	0.68	
Quebec Citizens' Union	Simon Beaudoin	84	0.26	
Équipe Autonomiste	Steve Nadeau	77	0.24	
Marxist–Leninist	Claude Moreau	64	0.20	
Unité Nationale	Oxana Vassiltchenko	56	0.17	
Total valid votes		32,563	98.56	–
Total rejected ballots		475	1.44	–
Turnout		33,038	71.13	
Electors on the lists		46,448	–	–
Liberal hold		Swing		-2.66

^ Change is from redistributed results. CAQ change is from ADQ.

2008 Quebec general election
Party	Candidate	Votes	%	±%
Liberal	Andre Drolet	14,196	46.48	
Parti Québécois	Helene Guillemette	7,497	24.54	
Action démocratique	Jean-Francois Gosselin	7,302	23.91	
Québec solidaire	Jean-Yves Desgagnes	1,236	4.05	
Independent	Jose Breton	314	1.03	

2007 Quebec general election
Party	Candidate	Votes	%	±%
Action démocratique	Jean-Francois Gosselin	13,865	39.86	
Liberal	Michel Després	10,185	29.28	
Parti Québécois	Christian Simard	7,990	22.97	
Québec solidaire	Jean-Yves Desgagnes	1,236	3.55	
Green	Lucien Rodrigue	1,159	3.33	–
Independent	Jose Breton	131	0.38	
Christian Democracy	Danielle Benny	116	0.33	
People's Front	Jean Bédard	100	0.29	

2003 Quebec general election
Party	Candidate	Votes	%	±%
Liberal	Michel Després	15547	44.22	
Parti Québécois	Robert Caron	9408	26.76	
Action démocratique	Aurel Bélanger	8912	25.35	
Independent	Jean-Yves Desgagnés	714	2.03	
Bloc Pot	Nicolas Frichot	390	1.11	
People's Front	Jean Bédard	185	0.53	

== See also ==
- List of Quebec provincial electoral districts
- Canadian provincial electoral districts
