= Option nationale =

Provincial political party in Québec, Canada (2011–18)

National Option Option Nationale
- Leader: Sol Zanetti
- Founder: Jean-Martin Aussant
- Founded: October 31, 2011
- Dissolved: January 1, 2018
- Split from: Parti Québécois
- Merged into: Québec solidaire
- Headquarters: Longueuil, Quebec
- Ideology: Quebec sovereigntism Quebec nationalism Progressivism; Social democracy Social liberalism
- Political position: Centre-left

Website
- www.optionnationale.org

Option Nationale ([ɔpsjɔ̃ nɑsjɔnal]), registered as Option nationale – Pour l'indépendance du Québec (National Option – For the Independence of Quebec), was a centre-left nationalist political party in Quebec, Canada. It advocated for the independence of Quebec from Canada, and said a vote for Option Nationale is an electoral mandate for full-fledged autonomy (de facto sovereignty), before holding a referendum to adopt the constitution of Quebec as an independent state (de jure sovereignty). It merged with Québec Solidaire on January 1, 2018 to become a collective within the party.

== History ==
It was founded in 2011 by Jean-Martin Aussant, an independent member of the National Assembly (MNA) who had quit the Parti Québécois (PQ) earlier that year after being elected in 2008.

The party had planned to use the name "Option Québec", as a nod to René Lévesque's 1968 manifesto An Option for Quebec, but it was already taken by another group.

In August 2011, before the party was founded, Aussant was courted by the Parti Indépendantiste, with leader Eric Tremblay hoping to have his first member of the National Assembly. Aussant refused however, saying he disagreed with the party's position on reducing immigration, and with the view of the party that the 1995 referendum was lost because of "anglophone and ethnic votes". Aussant insists that economic fears propagated by federalists were responsible for the referendum defeat.

Shortly after the creation of Option Nationale, Lisette Lapointe, wife of former Quebec Premier Jacques Parizeau, acquired a membership card from the party, but decided to continue sitting as an independent MNA until the end of her term, and did not run for reelection in the 2012 provincial election.

During the campaign of the 2012 general election, columnist Dan Delmar of the National Post commented:

Although the party led by former Péquiste Jean-Martin Aussant is desperate to breakaway [sic] from Canada, he is going about the project in a civilized manner. Aussant speaks near-perfect English, which is uncommon for post-Bernard Landry sovereignist leaders. And in a somewhat stunning development, he posted a YouTube video pitching sovereignty to Anglophones – in English! His brand of inclusive sovereignty is refreshing.

On June 19, 2013, Aussant resigned as leader of Option Nationale, and Nathaly Dufour became interim leader. On October 26, 2013, Sol Zanetti became the new leader of the party.

Option Nationale merged with Québec Solidaire on January 1, 2018 to become a collective within the party.

== Election results ==
Election	Seats won	Candidates	Popular vote	Popular vote (%)	Legislative role	Party leader
2012	0	120	82,535	1.89%	No representation in National Assembly	Jean-Martin Aussant
2014	0	116	30,720	0.73%	No representation in National Assembly	Sol Zanetti
