= Marie-Louise Tardif =

Canadian politician

Member of the National Assembly of Quebec for Laviolette–Saint-Maurice
- In office October 1, 2018 – August 27, 2026
- Preceded by: Riding established
- Succeeded by: Élodie Murphy-Gauthier

Personal details
- Born: Sainte-Anne-de-la-Pocatière
- Party: Coalition Avenir Québec

Marie-Louise Tardif is a Canadian politician, who was elected to the National Assembly of Quebec in the 2018 provincial election. She represented the electoral district of Laviolette–Saint-Maurice as a member of the Coalition Avenir Québec. On March 7, 2023, Tardif temporarily withdrew from the CAQ's caucus amid allegations that Tardif threatened her former constituency manager in court. On March 29, 2023, Tardif rejoined the CAQ's caucus after prosecutors decided not to charge her due to insufficient evidence. She did not seek re-election in the 2026 general election.

== Electoral record ==
2022 Quebec general election: Laviolette-Saint-Maurice
Party	Candidate	Votes	%	±%
Coalition Avenir Québec	Marie-Louise Tardif	19,418	51.72	+6.31
Conservative	Pierre-David Tremblay	6,287	16.75	+14.97
Parti Québécois	Pascal Bastarache	6,010	16.01	+0.34
Québec solidaire	France Lavigne	3,568	9.50	-5.62
Liberal	Kévin Nzoula-Mendome	1,875	4.99	-15.79
Independent	Jean-Patrick Berthiaume	137	0.36	–
L'Union fait la force	Raoul Parent	126	0.34	–
Famille et communautés	Josée St-Georges	122	0.32	–
Total valid votes		37,543	98.69	
Total rejected ballots		497	1.31	
Turnout		38,040	64.04	
Electors on the lists		59,400		

2018 Quebec general election: Laviolette-Saint-Maurice
Party	Candidate	Votes	%
Coalition Avenir Québec	Marie-Louise Tardif	16,260	45.41
Liberal	Pierre Giguère	7,440	20.78
Parti Québécois	Jacynthe Bruneau	5,611	15.67
Québec solidaire	Christine Cardin	5,414	15.12
Conservative	Ugo Hamel	639	1.78
Citoyens au pouvoir	Jacques Gosselin	444	1.24
Total valid votes		35,808	97.58
Total rejected ballots		888	2.42
Turnout		36,696	63.81
Eligible voters		57,511	
Source(s) "Rapport des résultats officiels du scrutin". Élections Québec.
