= Laviolette–Saint-Maurice =

Provincial electoral district in Quebec, Canada

Quebec electoral district

Provincial electoral district
- Legislature: National Assembly of Quebec
MNA
Élodie Murphy-Gauthier
Parti Québécois
- First contested: 2018
- Last contested: 2026

Demographics
- Census division(s): La Tuque, Les Chenaux, Maskinongé, Mékinac Regional County Municipality, Shawinigan
- Census subdivision(s): Grandes-Piles, La Bostonnais, Lac-Édouard, La Tuque, Notre-Dame-du-Mont-Carmel, Saint-Roch-de-Mékinac, Shawinigan, Trois-Rives

Laviolette–Saint-Maurice (French pronunciation: [lavjɔlɛt sɛ̃ mɔʁis]) is a provincial electoral district in Quebec, Canada. It was created from parts of Laviolette and Saint-Maurice districts. It will be first contested in the 2018 Quebec general election. It notably includes the cities of Shawinigan and La Tuque.

== Members of the National Assembly ==
Legislature	Years	Member	Party
Riding created from Laviolette and Saint-Maurice
42nd	2018–2022	Marie-Louise Tardif	Coalition Avenir Québec
43rd	2022–2023	Marie-Louise Tardif	Coalition Avenir Québec
43rd	2023–2023	Marie-Louise Tardif	Independent
43rd	2023–2026	Marie-Louise Tardif	Coalition Avenir Québec
44th	2026–Present	Élodie Murphy-Gauthier	Parti Québécois

== Election results ==
2026 Quebec general election
** Preliminary results — Not yet official **
Party	Candidate	Votes	%	±%
Parti Québécois	Élodie Murphy-Gauthier	12,142	31.35	+15.34
Conservative	Charles Paquin	10,611	27.40	+10.65
Liberal	Laurent Bélisle	6,620	17.09	+12.10
Coalition Avenir Québec	Guy Veillette	6,056	15.64	–36.08
Québec solidaire	Rébéka Frédette	2,644	6.83	–2.67
Climat Québec	Hugo Laperrière Piché	313	0.81	N/A
Bloc Pot	Jean-Patrick Berthiaume	212	0.55	N/A
Démocratie directe	Stéphane Gélinas	135	0.35	N/A
Total valid votes		38,733	98.14	–0.55
Total rejected ballots		733	1.86	+0.55
Turnout		39,466	64.82	+1.01
Electors on the lists		39,466		
Parti Québécois gain from Coalition Avenir Québec		Swing		+2.35
Source: Élections Québec

2022 Quebec general election
Party	Candidate	Votes	%	±%
Coalition Avenir Québec	Marie-Louise Tardif	19,418	51.72	+6.31
Conservative	Pierre-David Tremblay	6,287	16.75	+14.97
Parti Québécois	Pascal Bastarache	6,010	16.01	+0.34
Québec solidaire	France Lavigne	3,568	9.50	-5.62
Liberal	Kévin Nzoula-Mendome	1,875	4.99	-15.79
Independent	Jean-Patrick Berthiaume	137	0.36	–
L'Union fait la force	Raoul Parent	126	0.34	–
Famille et communautés	Josée St-Georges	122	0.32	–
Total valid votes		37,543	98.69	
Total rejected ballots		497	1.31	
Turnout		38,040	64.04	
Electors on the lists		59,400		

2018 Quebec general election
Party	Candidate	Votes	%
Coalition Avenir Québec	Marie-Louise Tardif	16,260	45.41
Liberal	Pierre Giguère	7,440	20.78
Parti Québécois	Jacynthe Bruneau	5,611	15.67
Québec solidaire	Christine Cardin	5,414	15.12
Conservative	Ugo Hamel	639	1.78
Citoyens au pouvoir	Jacques Gosselin	444	1.24
Total valid votes		35,808	97.58
Total rejected ballots		888	2.42
Turnout		36,696	63.81
Eligible voters		57,511	
Source(s) "Rapport des résultats officiels du scrutin". Élections Québec.

== See also ==
- List of Quebec provincial electoral districts
- Canadian provincial electoral districts
