= Élodie Murphy-Gauthier =

Quebec politician

Élodie Murphy-Gauthier MNA

Member of the National Assembly for Laviolette-Saint-Maurice
- Incumbent
- Assumed office October 5, 2026
- Preceded by: Marie-Louise Tardif

Personal details
- Party: Parti Québécois

Élodie Murphy-Gauthier is a Quebec politician who was the elected to the National Assembly of Quebec for Laviolette-Saint-Maurice in the 2026 Quebec general election as a member of the Parti Québécois. She succeeded Marie-Louise Tardif. She is a family physician.
