= 2026 Quebec general election =

Canadian provincial election

- October 5, 2026

127 seats in the National Assembly of Quebec 64 seats needed for a majority
- Opinion polls
- Turnout: 66.93% (▲0.78 pp)
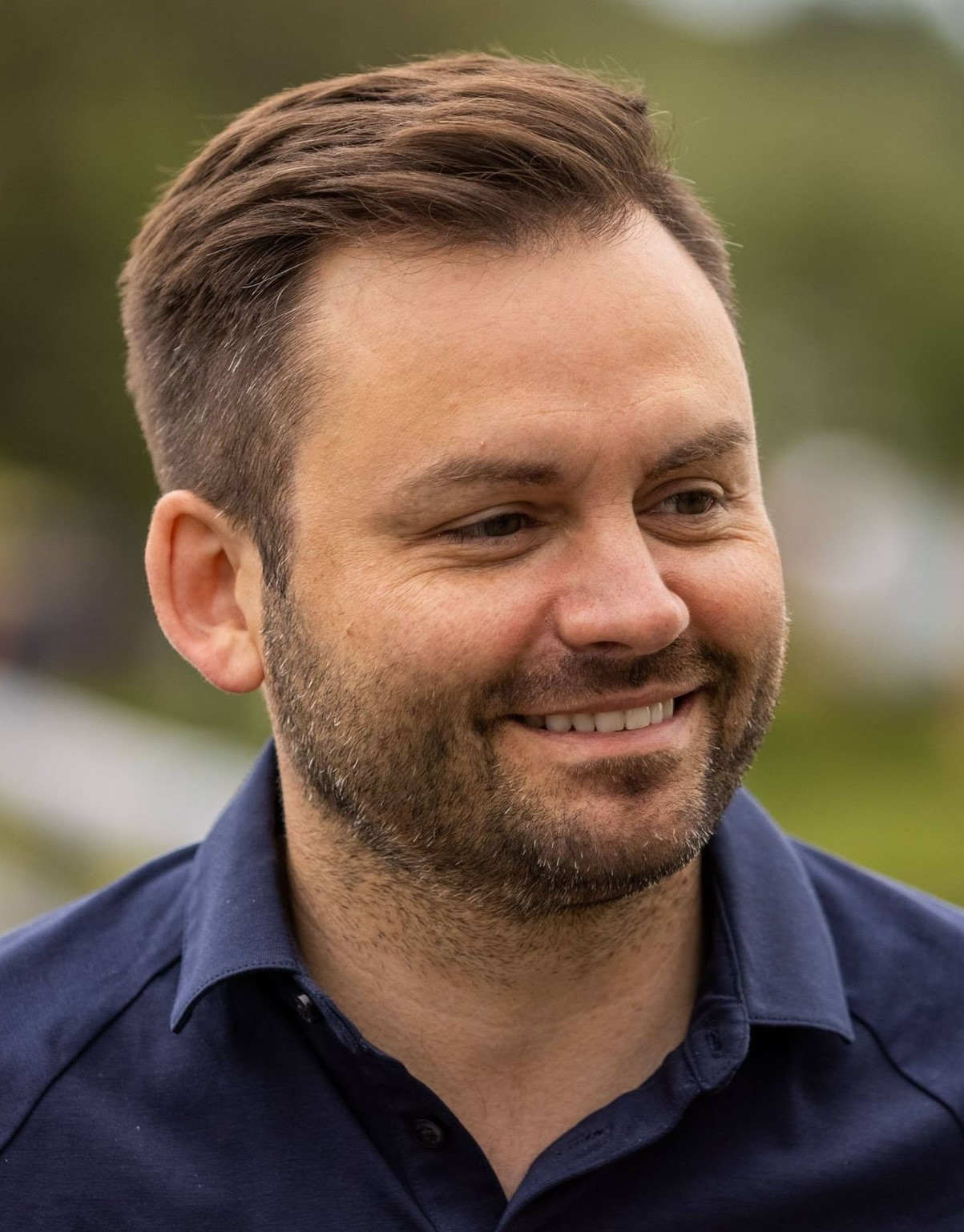

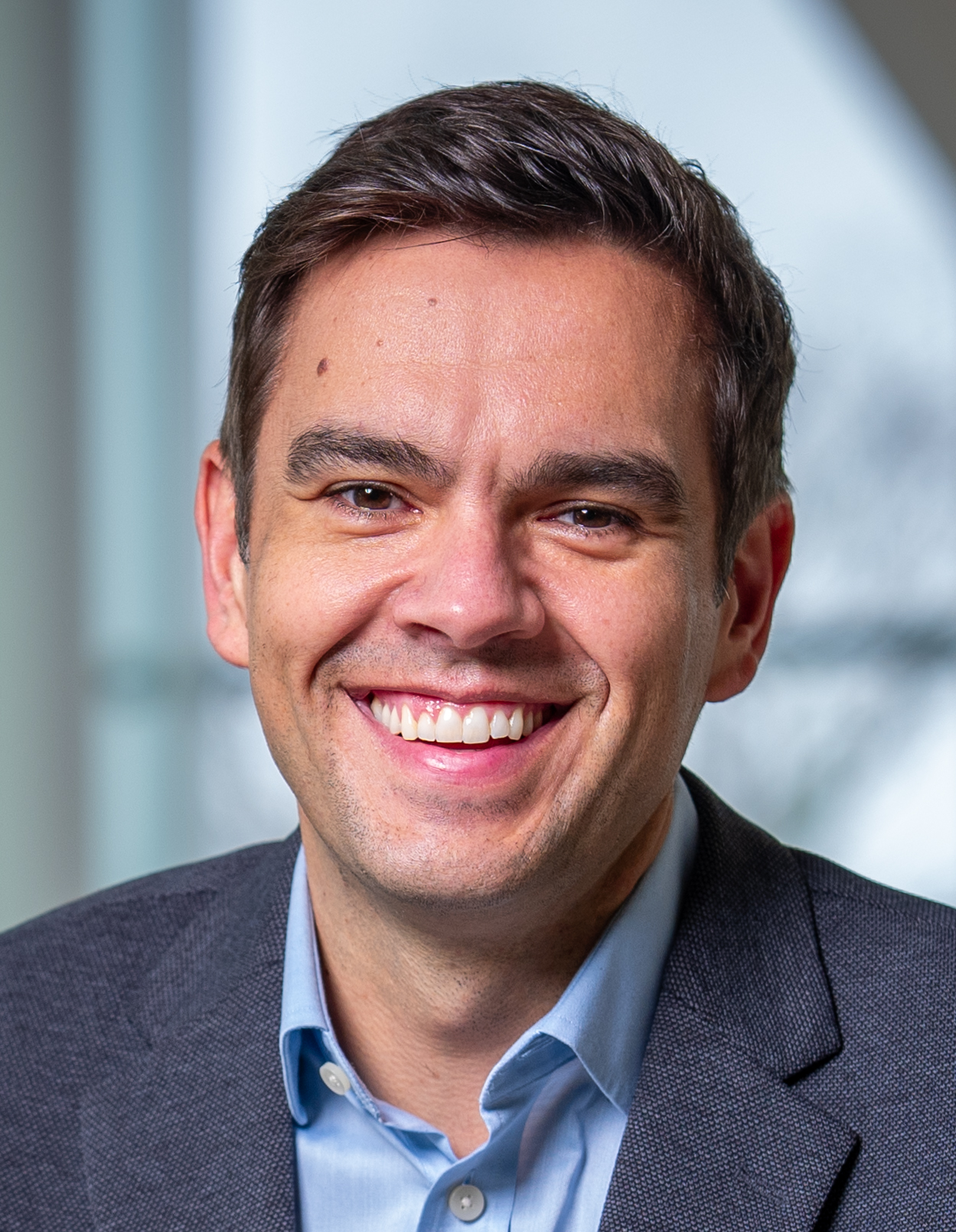

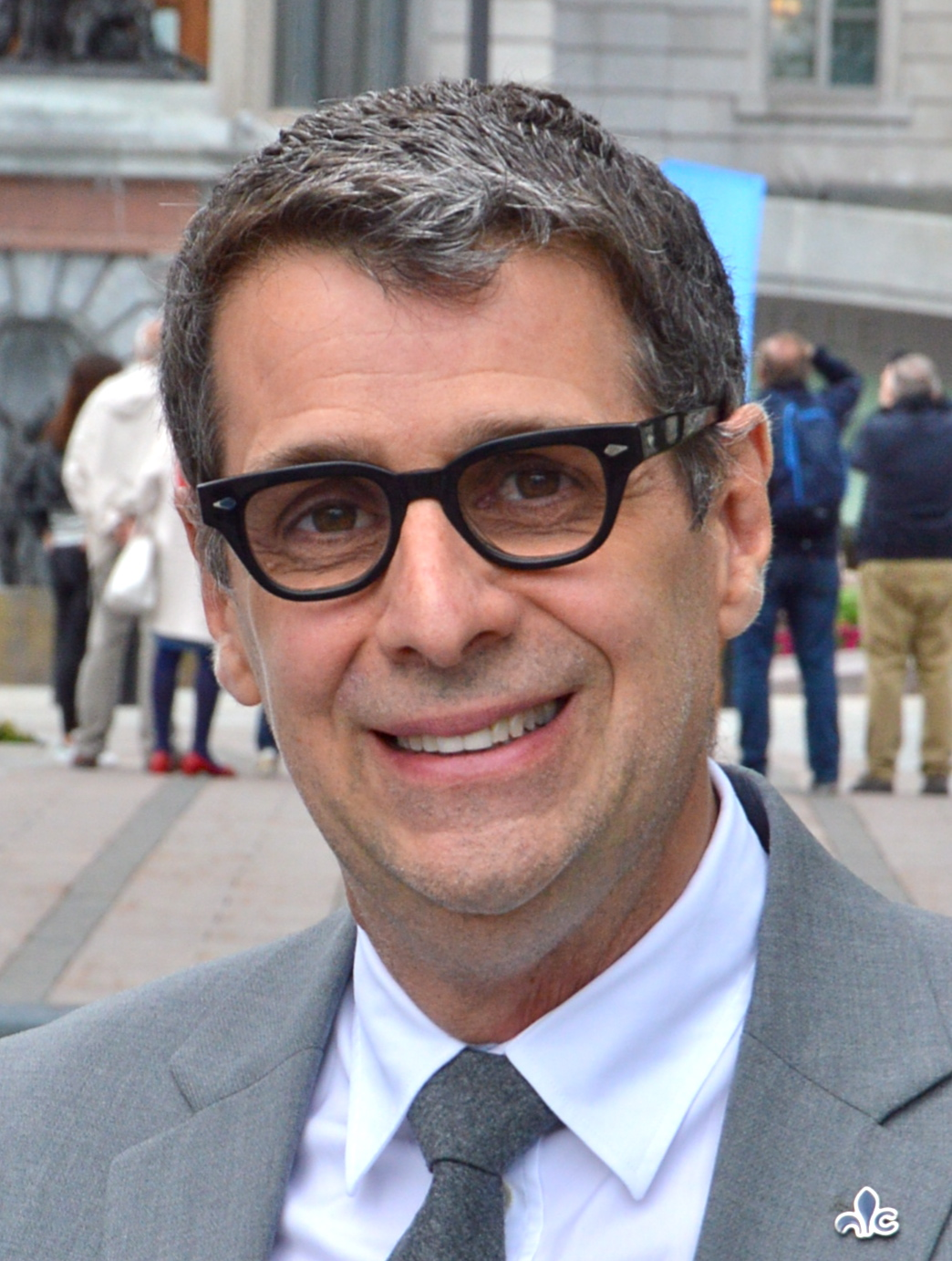

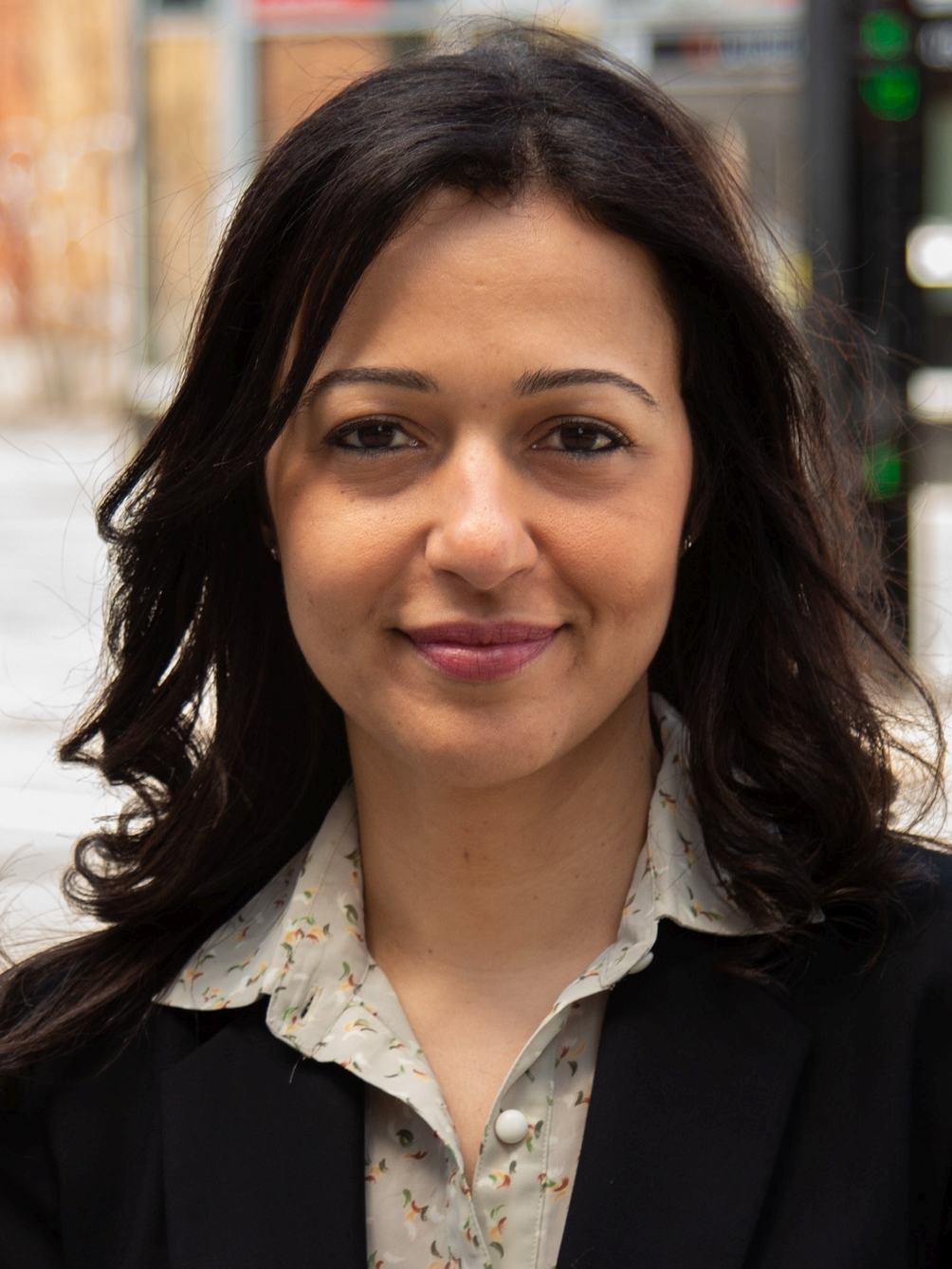

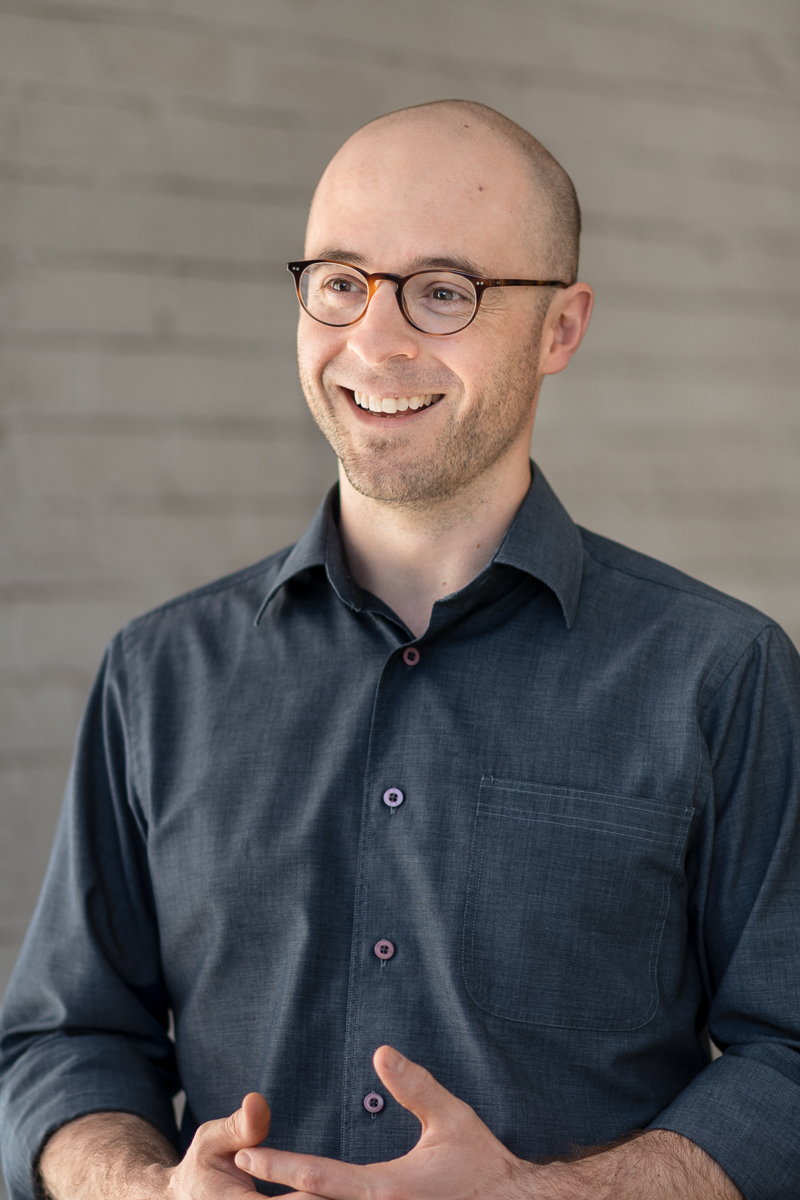

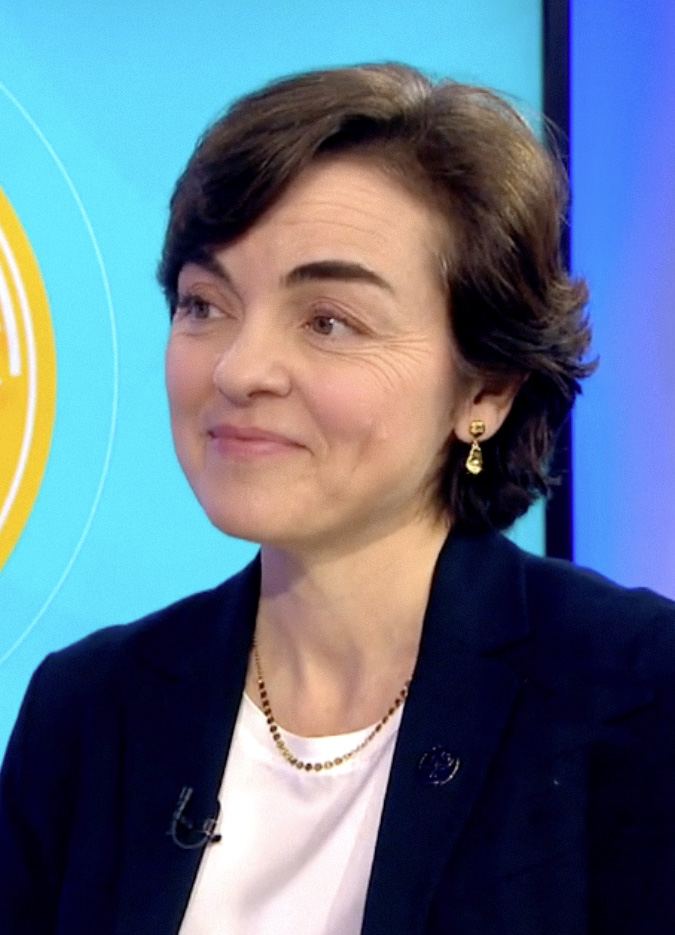
	Majority party	Minority party	Third party
Leader	Paul St-Pierre Plamondon	Charles Milliard	Éric Duhaime
Party	Parti Québécois	Liberal	Conservative
Leader since	October 9, 2020	February 13, 2026	April 17, 2021
Leader's seat	Camille-Laurin	Orford (won seat)	Bellechasse (won seat)
Last election	3 seats, 14.61%	21 seats, 14.37%	0 seats, 12.91%
Seats before	7	18	1
Seats won	60	39	19
Seat change	▲53	▲21	▲18
Popular vote	1,200,369	1,037,953	885,337
Percentage	28.02%	24.23%	20.66%
Swing	▲13.41 pp	▲9.86 pp	▲7.75 pp
	Fourth party	Fifth party
Leader	Ruba Ghazal & Sol Zanetti (Note: Québec solidaire designates Ghazal and Sol Zanetti as co-spokespeople. Ghazal is the party's candidate for premier in the 2026 election.)	Christine Fréchette
Party	Québec solidaire	Coalition Avenir Québec
Leader since	November 16, 2024	April 12, 2026
Leader's seat	Mercier	Ran in Trois-Rivières (lost) (Note: Incumbent MNA for Sanguinet.)
Last election	11 seats, 15.43%	90 seats, 40.98%
Seats before	11	79
Seats won	9	0
Seat change	▼2	▼79
Popular vote	532,114	572,040
Percentage	12.42%	13.35%
Swing	▼3.01 pp	▼27.63 pp
Premier before election
Christine Fréchette
Coalition Avenir Québec
Premier after election
Paul St-Pierre Plamondon
Parti Québécois

The 2026 Quebec general election was held on October 5, 2026, to elect members to the National Assembly of the 44th Quebec Legislature. Lieutenant Governor Manon Jeannotte dropped the writs of election on August 27, 2026, after Premier Christine Fréchette advised her to dissolve the legislature. Key issues of the election campaign included the cost of living, housing, Quebec sovereignty, infrastructure, protection of Quebec culture and the French language, U.S. tariffs, healthcare, the economy, and energy.

Fréchette and the governing Coalition Avenir Québec lost all 79 of their seats, easily the worst defeat for a sitting government in Quebec history. It was only the fourth time in Canadian history that a ruling party suffered a complete electoral wipeout, joining the Prince Edward Island Conservatives in 1935, the United Farmers of Alberta in 1935, and the New Brunswick Progressive Conservatives in 1987. In terms of the number and percentage of seats lost, this far surpassed the 1987 loss by Richard Hatfield and the New Brunswick Tories as the worst defeat for a provincial government in Canadian history. Saying that she alone was responsible for the debacle, Fréchette announced the following day she would step down as CAQ leader.

Paul St-Pierre Plamondon led the Parti Québécois to a massive rebound in popularity. After leading opinion polls for almost three years, the PQ jumped from 7 seats to 60, after having won just 3 in 2022. Plamondon became Premier-designate of Quebec, but fell short of a majority government that had been predicted by many pundits. The Quebec Liberal Party placed second with their highest seat count since 2014 to form the province's official opposition, while the Conservative Party of Quebec gained official party status for the first time since being founded in 2009, and the first time since 1935 that seats would be won under a Conservative party banner. Québec solidaire dropped 2 seats from 11 to 9.

This was the first election in Quebec history where no party reached 30% of the popular vote. However, the PQ's heavy concentration of support in francophone ridings brought it within five seats of a majority. Historically, Quebec provincial elections have seen large discrepancies between raw vote and actual seat count. As well, it was the first since 1998 in which sovereigntist parties won a combined majority of seats in the National Assembly. Between them, the PQ and Québec solidaire held 69 seats.

== Background ==
In the 2022 general election, the Coalition Avenir Québec under François Legault increased its parliamentary majority, winning 90 seats. The Liberals, despite finishing fourth in the popular vote behind Québec solidaire and the Parti Québécois, remained the official opposition, winning 21 seats. The Parti Québécois lost most of its remaining seats but managed to elect its previously seatless leader Paul St-Pierre Plamondon to a seat. The Conservatives increased their share of the vote to 13%; however, as their support was more spread out throughout Quebec, they did not gain any seats.

On January 14, 2026, Legault announced his pending resignation as leader of the CAQ and premier of Quebec.

Under the province's fixed election date law, passed in 2013, "the general election following the end of a Legislature shall be held on the first Monday of October of the fourth calendar year following the year that includes the last day of the previous Legislature", setting the date for October 5, 2026. On August 27, premier Fréchette visited the lieutenant governor of Quebec to advise her to dissolve the legislature and call a general election.

Ahead of the election, the CAQ officially changed its registration to Équipe Christine Fréchette – Coalition Avenir Québec.

=== Political parties and standings ===
The table below lists parties represented and seats held in the National Assembly after the 2022 provincial election.

Name	Ideology	Position	Leader	2022 result		Seats at Dissolution
Name	Ideology	Position	Leader	Votes (%)	Seats	Seats at Dissolution
Coalition Avenir; Québec	Quebec nationalism; Quebec autonomism; Conservatism	Centre-right to right-wing	Christine Fréchette	40.98%	90 / 125	79 / 125
Liberal	Quebec federalism; Economic liberalism; Liberalism	Centre to centre-right	Charles Milliard	14.37%	21 / 125	18 / 125
Québec solidaire	Quebec sovereigntism; Democratic socialism; Environmentalism	Left-wing	Ruba Ghazal & Sol Zanetti (co-spokespersons)	15.43%	11 / 125	11 / 125
Parti Québécois	Quebec sovereigntism; Quebec nationalism; Social democracy; Economic nationalism; Cultural conservatism	Centre-left to centre	Paul St-Pierre Plamondon	14.61%	3 / 125	7 / 125
Conservative	Quebec federalism; Economic liberalism; Conservatism	Right-wing	Éric Duhaime	12.91%	0 / 125	1 / 125
Independents	N/A			0.05%	0 / 125	9 / 125
Vacant	N/A					0 / 125

== Changes to the National Assembly ==
=== Constituency name changes ===
The following electoral districts had their names changed in June 2025:

Old name	New name
Arthabaska	Arthabaska–L'Érable
Laporte	Pierre-Laporte
Matane-Matapédia	Matane-Matapédia-Mitis
Rivière-du-Loup–Témiscouata	Rivière-du-Loup–Témiscouata–Les Basques
Vimont	Vimont-Auteuil

=== Redistribution of seats ===
For the 2026 election, the Assembly was increased to 127 seats. Two new seats were created, 39 had their boundaries changed, and five regions saw no changes at all.

Changes to electoral districts (2026)
Region	New district	Modifications
Capitale-Nationale		La Peltrie; Portneuf; Vanier-Les Rivières
Centre-du-Québec	Marie-Lacoste-Gérin-Lajoie (Note: drawn from parts of Johnson, Nicolet-Bécancour and Drummond–Bois-Francs)	Arthabaska–L'Érable; Drummond–Bois-Francs; Nicolet-Bécancour
Estrie		Brome-Missisquoi; Daniel-Johnson (Note: formerly Johnson); Granby; Mégantic; Orford; Richmond; Saint-François
Lanaudière		Berthier; L'Assomption; Repentigny; Terrebonne
Laurentides	Bellefeuille (Note: drawn from parts of Saint-Jérôme, Mirabel and Argenteuil)	Argenteuil; Les Plaines; Mirabel; Saint-Jérôme
Laval		Chomedey; Laval-des-Rapides; Mille-Îles
Montérégie		Beauharnois; Borduas; Huntingdon; Richelieu; Saint-Hyacinthe; Saint-Jean; Soulanges; Vaudreuil; Verchères
Outaouais		Chapleau; Gatineau; Hull; Papineau
Saguenay–Lac-Saint-Jean		Chicoutimi; Dubuc

Unchanged electoral divisions – statutory preservation (2026)
Arising from	Region	Divisions	Number
An Act to ensure effective representation of electors, L.Q. 2026, c. 15	Bas-Saint-Laurent	Matane-Matapédia-Mitis; Rimouski	2
An Act to ensure effective representation of electors, L.Q. 2026, c. 15	Gaspésie–Îles-de-la-Madeleine	Bonaventure; Gaspé	2
An Act to ensure effective representation of electors, L.Q. 2026, c. 15	Montreal	Anjou–Louis-Riel; Camille-Laurin; Hochelaga-Maisonneuve; LaFontaine; Laurier-Dorion; Pointe-aux-Trembles; Sainte-Marie-Saint-Jacques; Viau	8
Total			12

Regions with no electoral changes (2026)
Arising from	Region	Divisions	Number
Commission Order	Abitibi-Témiscamingue	All divisions	3
Commission Order	Chaudière-Appalaches	All divisions	7
Commission Order	Côte-Nord	All divisions	2
Commission Order	Mauricie	All divisions	4
Commission Order	Nord-du-Québec	All divisions	1
Total			17

== Timeline ==
=== Changes in the 43rd National Assembly of Quebec ===
seat changed hands after by-election
involuntary departure
Coalition Avenir Québec
Parti Québécois
Liberal
Québec solidaire
Conservative
Independent

43rd Quebec Legislature (2022–26) - Membership and party affiliation changes
Electoral District	Before			Change	
Electoral District	Date	Reason	Incumbent	New member	Date
Vaudreuil	October 27, 2022	Expelled from caucus; re-admitted to caucus	Marie-Claude Nichols		May 2, 2025
Saint-Henri–Sainte-Anne	Dec 1, 2022	Resignation	Dominique Anglade	Guillaume Cliche-Rivard	March 13, 2023
Laviolette–Saint-Maurice	March 7, 2023	Left caucus; rejoined caucus	Marie-Louise Tardif		March 28, 2023
Jean-Talon	July 31, 2023	Resignation	Joëlle Boutin	Pascal Paradis	October 2, 2023
Marguerite-Bourgeoys	October 7, 2023	Removed from caucus; re-admitted to caucus	Frédéric Beauchemin		December 15, 2023
Arthabaska	April 16, 2024	Resignation from party	Éric Lefebvre		
Arthabaska	March 18, 2025	Resignation	Éric Lefebvre	Alex Boissonneault	August 11, 2025
Terrebonne	Sep 3, 2024	Resignation	Pierre Fitzgibbon	Catherine Gentilcore	March 17, 2025
Saint-Jérôme	Sep 12, 2024	Resignation from party	Youri Chassin		
Chicoutimi	Sep 4, 2025	Resignation	Andrée Laforest	Marie-Karlynn Laflamme	Feb 23, 2026
Abitibi-Est	Sep 5, 2025	Expelled from caucus	Pierre Dufour		
Rimouski	Sep 18, 2025	Left caucus; joined Conservative	Maïté Blanchette Vézina		March 24, 2026
Taillon	October 30, 2025	Resignation from cabinet and caucus; rejoined party caucus	Lionel Carmant		April 1, 2026
Laporte	Nov 4, 2025	Expelled from caucus	Isabelle Poulet		
Rosemont	Nov 22, 2025	Left caucus	Vincent Marissal		
Saint-Laurent	Dec 2, 2025	Expelled from caucus	Marwah Rizqy		
Chomedey	Dec 4, 2025	Expelled from caucus	Sona Lakhoyan Olivier		
La Prairie	Dec 18, 2025	Left caucus	Christian Dubé		
Dubuc	January 9, 2026	Left caucus	François Tremblay		
Orford	April 22, 2026	Left caucus	Gilles Bélanger		

=== By-elections ===
Analysis of by-elections by turnout and vote share for winning candidate (vs 2022)
Riding and winning party			Turnout		Vote share for winning candidate	
Riding and winning party			%	Change (pp)	%	Change (pp)
Saint-Henri–Sainte-Anne	█ Québec solidaire	Gain	31.10	-26.72	44.50	16.78
Jean-Talon	█ Parti Québécois	Gain	55.21	-18.64	44.06	25.37
Terrebonne	█ Parti Québécois	Gain	37.26	-33.91	52.74	33.86
Arthabaska	█ Parti Québécois	Gain	59.98	-14.12	46.37	36.36
Chicoutimi	█ Parti Québécois	Gain	34.22	-34.51	45.35	31.14

=== 2022 ===
- October 3 – The Coalition Avenir Québec led by François Legault wins a second majority government in the 43rd Quebec general election.
- November 7 – Dominique Anglade resigns as the leader of the Quebec Liberal Party, triggering a leadership election to determine her successor.
- November 10 – LaFontaine MNA Marc Tanguay is named interim leader of the Quebec Liberal Party.

=== 2023 ===
- May 16 – Manon Massé announced that she will not seek re-election as female spokesperson at Québec Solidaire's next convention held from November 24 to 26, 2023, in Gatineau.
- November 26 – Émilise Lessard-Therrien is elected as Québec Solidaire's female spokesperson.

=== 2024 ===
- April 29 – Lessard-Therrien resigns as Québec Solidaire's female spokesperson.
- May 2 – Sherbrooke MNA Christine Labrie becomes Québec Solidaire's interim female spokesperson.
- November 16 – Mercier MNA Ruba Ghazal is elected female spokesperson of Québec Solidaire.

=== 2025 ===
- March 20 – Gabriel Nadeau-Dubois resigns as Québec Solidaire's male spokesperson.
- March 24 – Saint-Henri–Sainte-Anne MNA Guillaume Cliche-Rivard becomes Québec Solidaire's interim male spokesperson.
- June 14 – Pablo Rodriguez wins the 2025 Quebec Liberal Party leadership election.
- September 10 – François Legault conducts a major cabinet reshuffle.
- November 8 – Jean-Lesage MNA Sol Zanetti wins the 2025 Québec solidaire co-spokesperson election.
- December 17 – Pablo Rodriguez resigns as leader of the Quebec Liberal Party.
- December 19 – LaFontaine MNA Marc Tanguay is named interim leader of the Quebec Liberal Party.

=== 2026 ===
- January 14 – Francois Legault announces his pending resignation as premier of Quebec and leader of the Coalition Avenir Québec, triggering a leadership election.
- February 13 – Charles Milliard wins the 2026 Quebec Liberal Party leadership election by acclamation.
- April 12 – Christine Fréchette wins the 2026 Coalition Avenir Québec leadership election.
- April 15 – Fréchette is sworn in as the 33rd Premier of Quebec.
- April 21 – The Fréchette ministry is sworn in.
- August 27 – Fréchette advises the lieutenant governor to dissolve the national assembly and call a general election for October 5, 2026.
- September 9 – First debate is hosted by Radio-Canada.
- September 15 – Second debate is hosted by TVA Nouvelles.
- September 16 – Third debate is hosted by Noovo Info/Crave.
- September 23 – Final debate is hosted by Radio-Canada.
- October 5 – Election day.

== Campaign ==
=== Contests ===
Candidate contests (2026)
Candidates nominated	Electoral districts	Party															
Candidates nominated	Electoral districts	CAQ	PQ	PLQ	PCQ	QS	Climat	Nul	PVQ	CaPQ	DD	Ind	Presence	MLP	Comm	Other	Totals
5	10	10	10	10	10	10	–	–	–	–	–	–	–	–	–	–	50
6	35	35	35	35	35	35	12	7	2	3	4	2	1	1	–	3	210
7	42	42	42	42	42	42	14	8	19	12	10	4	7	1	–	9	294
8	19	19	19	19	19	19	13	9	3	4	7	5	6	3	1	6	152
9	14	14	14	14	14	14	8	9	8	7	4	5	3	4	2	6	126
10	4	4	4	4	4	4	2	3	3	1	2	2	1	1	4	1	40
11	1	1	1	1	1	1	1	1	–	1	1	–	–	–	1	1	11
12	1	1	1	1	1	1	1	1	1	–	–	–	–	1	1	2	12
13	1	1	1	1	1	1	1	–	1	1	–	1	–	1	1	2	13
Total	127	127	127	127	127	127	52	38	37	29	28	19	18	12	10	30	908

=== Incumbents not standing for re-election ===
Incumbent MNA	Electoral District	Date announced
Marwah Rizqy	Saint-Laurent	October 1, 2024
Gabriel Nadeau-Dubois	Gouin	March 20, 2025
Christine Labrie	Sherbrooke	June 7, 2025
Christian Dubé	La Prairie	August 25, 2025
André Lamontagne	Johnson	September 8, 2025
Suzanne Roy	Verchères	September 8, 2025
Manon Massé	Sainte-Marie–Saint-Jacques	October 20, 2025
Sylvain Lévesque	Chauveau	December 19, 2025
Denis Lamothe	Ungava	January 9, 2026
François Legault	L'Assomption	January 14, 2026
Geneviève Guilbault	Louis-Hébert	January 18, 2026
Sonia LeBel	Champlain	January 19, 2026
Haroun Bouazzi	Maurice-Richard	January 21, 2026
Jonatan Julien	Charlesbourg	February 2, 2026
Lionel Carmant	Taillon	February 3, 2026
André Bachand	Richmond	February 27, 2026
Vincent Marissal	Rosemont	March 2, 2026
Caroline Proulx	Berthier	March 2, 2026
Lucie Lecours	Les Plaines	March 17, 2026
Isabelle Poulet	Laporte	March 17, 2026
Éric Caire	La Peltrie	March 26, 2026
Louis Lemieux	Saint-Jean	April 2, 2026
Isabelle Charest	Brome-Missisquoi	April 6, 2026
Nancy Guillemette	Roberval	April 7, 2026
Agnès Grondin	Argenteuil	April 8, 2026
Youri Chassin	Saint-Jérôme	April 10, 2026
Alice Abou-Khalil	Fabre	April 20, 2026
Chantale Jeannotte	Labelle	May 25, 2026
Isabelle Lecours	Lotbinière-Frontenac	May 28, 2026
François St-Louis	Joliette	May 29, 2026
Luc Provençal	Beauce-Nord	May 29, 2026
Carole Mallette	Huntingdon	May 29, 2026
Mario Asselin	Vanier-Les Rivières	May 30, 2026
Robert Bussière	Gatineau	May 31, 2026
Marie-Louise Tardif	Laviolette–Saint-Maurice	June 1, 2026
Mathieu Lemay	Masson	June 3, 2026
Sylvie D'Amours	Mirabel	June 8, 2026
Gilles Bélanger	Orford	June 8, 2026
Daniel Bernard	Rouyn-Noranda–Témiscamingue	June 12, 2026
Éric Girard	Lac-Saint-Jean	June 16, 2026
Jean Boulet	Trois-Rivières	June 17, 2026
Mathieu Lacombe	Papineau	June 18, 2026
Céline Haytayan	Laval-des-Rapides	July 2, 2026
François Tremblay	Dubuc	July 6, 2026
François Bonnardel	Granby	July 13, 2026
Marie-Claude Nichols	Vaudreuil	August 4, 2026
Chantal Soucy	Saint-Hyacinthe	August 6, 2026
Benoit Charette	Deux-Montagnes	August 19, 2026

=== Party slogans ===
Party	French	English (translation)
█ CAQ	Avançons	Unofficial: "Let's move forward"
█ Liberal	Rassembler. Réparer. Bâtir.	"Unite. Repair. Build."
█ QC solidaire	C'est possible	Unofficial: "It's possible"
█ Parti Québécois	Le choix de la confiance	Unofficial: "The choice of trust"
█ Conservative	Oser pour vrai	Unofficial: "Dare for real"

=== Party platforms ===
2026 Quebec election – issues and respective party platforms
Issue	QS	PQ	Liberal	CAQ	PCQ
Immigration	QS would increase the annual permanent number of immigrants to 70,000 from the current 45,000.	PQ would reduce the annual permanent number of immigrants to 35,000 from the current 45,000.; The PQ also promises to cut temporary immigration in half.; The PQ would impose a moratorium on international, permanent, economic immigration until the temporary immigration target is reached.	Maintain permanent immigration to vacillate between 45,000 and 70,000 per year.; Factor Quebec's capacity and workforce needs into the numbers.; Keep temporary immigration at current levels.	Keep the annual permanent number of immigrants to 45,000.	Regionalize immigration, allowing municipalities to set their own reception capacity.; Reduce the yearly share of refugees and family reunification immigrants from 20,000 to 10,000.; Change selection criteria to favour candidates sharing Quebecois values of democracy and freedom.
Sovereignty and monarchy	QS would launch a constituent assembly in consultation with First Nations and Inuit peoples as a first step toward making Quebec a sovereign country.	PQ remains committed to holding a referendum during a first term in government, although it will not hold one before January 20, 2029, when President of the United States Donald Trump is scheduled to leave office at the expiry of his second term.; Hold a referendum on Quebec sovereignty even if they did not get a majority government.; Within the first 100 days of a mandate, a PQ government would cut off funding to the Lieutenant Governor of Quebec and abolish the monarchy (even though it is provided for in the Canadian Constitution).	Liberals are opposed to holding a referendum on Quebec sovereignty.	CAQ is opposed to holding a referendum on Quebec sovereignty.	PCQ is opposed to holding a referendum on Quebec sovereignty.
Identity, diversity, language, demographics and secularism	Adopt the United Nations Declaration on the Rights of Indigenous Peoples (UNDRIP).; Co-draft bills with indigenous peoples.	PQ would apply Bill 101 to CEGEPs.; PQ supports a baby bonus of $350 a year for a third and fourth child.; PQ would expand Quebec secularism laws, by banning elementary school students from wearing hijabs, kippahs and other "conspicuous religious symbols".; Consult with the First Nations and Inuit to develop a plan to strengthen indigenous languages.	Invest $380 million over four years in measures to help immigrants learn French and integrate better into Quebec society and workplaces.; Expand the period to learn French before the government starts to communicate with them only in French from six months to two years for new arrivals.; Extend the shareable parental leave by two weeks or parents can receive an equal payment to help with the costs of raising their child.; Will not renew the notwithstanding clause protecting Bill 21. Will wait for the Supreme Court of Canada decision before amending it.	None	None
Economy and public finance	QS says it would raise $5 billion through a wealth tax on fortunes over $25 million.; QS says it would raise taxes on incomes above $110,000.	PQ says it would lower corporate income taxes from 11.5 percent to 9.5 percent.	Balance the budget by 2029–30.; Increase revenue by $1.3 billion in time for the 2030–31 fiscal year by econfiguring corporate tax credits, taxing online gambling, cancelling some CAQ tax cuts and taking steps to counter tax evasion.; Increase infrastructure spending by $945 million in 2030–31.; Spend $375 million per year to pay students for public-sector work placements.	None	It would gradually reduce the provincial corporate taxes rate from 11.5 per cent to 4.7 per cent.
Health care	None	Abolish Santé Québec.	Invest $350 million in home care.	None	None

=== Housing ===
Housing affordability is an important issue in the 2026 campaign. The shortage of affordable housing, rising rents and the construction of new housing have become significant concerns for municipalities and other organizations. Municipalities have called for greater support for the construction of affordable housing in order to address the housing shortage and improve access to affordable homes. All parties have proposed various housing plans.

=== Economy and cost of living ===
The economy and cost of living are prominent issues in the 2026 campaign. The Coalition Avenir Québec has made the cost of living and economic security among the main themes of its early campaign efforts.

=== Health care and public services ===
Health care is another major issue in the campaign. Issues raised by organizations in the health sector include access to primary care, the role of the private sector, working conditions and the governance of Santé Québec. Parti Québécois leader Paul St-Pierre Plamondon has pledged to abolish Santé Québec. He later suggested that he would keep part of it as a division within the Ministry of Health.

=== Immigration and the French language ===
Immigration and the protection of the French language remain important issues in Quebec political debate. The planning of temporary and permanent immigration levels, as well as their effects on public services and linguistic integration, are among the issues being debated ahead of the 2026 election. Following a breakdown in negotiations during the 2025–2026 United States trade war with Canada, prime minister Mark Carney stated that the Americans made "threats to the French language" and "Quebec culture", and made efforts "to restrict our protections of our language, our culture, and in effect, our sovereignty", which helped spell "the end of this phase of the negotiations"; this was denied by Trump and his officials.

In addition, voting information mail from Élections Québec will be French-only, sparking criticism from some groups.

=== Quebec independence ===
The question of Quebec independence has returned to a prominent place in the campaign. Parti Québécois leader Paul St-Pierre Plamondon remains committed to holding a referendum during a first term in government, although he has stated that he would not hold one before January 20, 2029, when President of the United States Donald Trump is scheduled to leave office at the expiry of his second term. Plamondon claimed that too much political uncertainty would be created by holding a referendum while Trump remains in office. On September 9th, 2026, Plamondon pledged to hold a referendum on Quebec sovereignty even if the PQ did not get a majority government.

On National Day for Truth and Reconciliation, the Mohawk Council of Kahnawà:ke took issue with Parti Québécois lack of recognition of Indigenous rights in the blue book, their policy book. They pointed out that Quebec needs to consult indigenous communities if they wanted to pursue independence. On the same day, Plamondon revealed that, if Quebec voted yes on a referendum, a PQ government would adopt a temporary constitution where Indigenous support is not essential.

=== Debates ===
On June 23, 2026, it was announced that there would be no English debate during the election. This was the second consecutive election that the Coalition Avenir Québec (CAQ) and Parti Québécois (PQ) declined to participate in a debate in English. Québec solidaire and the Conservative Party of Quebec had agreed to a debate.

Date	Organizers	Location	Moderator	P Present I Invitee N Non-invitee					Source
Date	Organizers	Location	Moderator	Fréchette	Milliard	Ghazal	Plamondon	Duhaime	Source
September 9, 2026 (Note: In the form of individual exchanges.)	Radio-Canada	National Assembly of Quebec	Sébastien Bovet, Anne-Marie Dussault, Alec Castonguay	P	P	P	P	P	
September 15, 2026	TVA Nouvelles	TVA Nouvelles Studio	Paul Larocque	P	P	P	P	P	
September 16, 2026	Noovo Info/Crave	Campus Bell	Michel Bherer	P	P	P	P	P	
September 23, 2026	Radio-Canada	Maison de Radio-Canada, Montreal	Patrice Roy	P	P	P	P	P	

== Opinion polls ==
Opinion polling during the election

Opinion polling since the 2022 election

Timeline of opinion polls
Polling organisation	Last date of polling	Source	Sample size	MoE	CAQ	QS	PQ	Liberal	PCQ	Other	Lead
Forum Research	October 4, 2026	HTML	1,227	±2.8%	13	13	26	25	21	2	1
Research Co.	October 4, 2026	HTML	708	±3.7%	13	10	31	25	20	1	6
Leger	October 3, 2026	PDF	892	—N/a	14	11	29	25	20	0	4
Liaison Strategies	October 3, 2026	PDF	900	—N/a	18	10	28	23	20	0	5
Mainstreet	October 3, 2026	PDF	2,011	—N/a	20	9	27	23	19	1	4
Pallas	October 3, 2026	PDF	1,137	—N/a	15	11	29	24	20	1	6
Leger	September 27, 2026	PDF	1,001	—N/a	16	9	30	26	18	0	4
Synopsis	September 27, 2026	PDF	1,000	—N/a	17	13	30	22	17	0	8
Pallas	September 26, 2026	PDF	1,192	—N/a	18	10	29	23	17	2	6
Leaders Debate on September 23, 2026.
Leger	September 21, 2026	PDF	1,001	—N/a	20	10	29	23	17	0	6
Pallas	September 17, 2026	PDF	1,089	—N/a	22	11	28	22	16	1	5
Segma	September 17, 2026	PDF	4,594	—N/a	22	12	29	19	18	0	7
Leaders Debate on September 16, 2026.
Leaders Debate on September 15, 2026.
Nanos	September 14, 2026	PDF	485	—N/a	21	9	28	24	16	2	4
Mainstreet (Note: Sponsored by the Coalition Avenir Quebec)	September 13, 2026	PDF	2,047	—N/a	28	8	24	22	17	2	4
Research Co.	September 13, 2026	HTML	705	±3.7%	23	10	28	22	16	1	5
Leger	September 13, 2026	PDF	1,013	—N/a	21	10	29	23	17	0	6
Synopsis	September 13, 2026	La Presse	1,000	—N/a	24	11	28	22	14	1	4
Pallas Data	September 12, 2026	PDF	1,085	—N/a	23	11	27	23	16	1	4
Leaders Debate on September 9, 2026.
Leger	September 6, 2026	PDF	1,008	—N/a	23	10	29	22	15	1	6
Pallas Data	September 5, 2026	PDF	1,100	—N/a	24	11	29	20	15	1	5
Leger	August 30, 2026	PDF	1,008	—N/a	24	10	29	22	15	0	5
Pallas Data	August 29, 2026	PDF	1,108	—N/a	24	9	29	22	16	1	5
Campaign period officially begins on August 27, 2026.
Synopsis	August 26, 2026	La Presse	1,009	—N/a	27	10	28	20	14	1	1
Leger	August 24, 2026	PDF	1,010	—N/a	23	7	30	23	16	2	7
Leger	August 9, 2026	PDF	998	—N/a	20	11	30	24	13	2	6
Pallas Data	August 2, 2026	HTML	1,121	±3%	19	9	31	27	14	0	4
Leger	June 15, 2026	PDF	1,014	—N/a	21	8	30	27	13	2	3
Pallas Data	June 12, 2026	PDF	1,099	±3%	20.0	11.2	28.6	24.7	14.1	1.4	3.9
Synopsis	June 8, 2026	PDF	1,000	—N/a	21	11	31	25	12	1	6
Leger	May 18, 2026	PDF	1,027	—N/a	22	8	30	28	11	1	2
Mainstreet Research	May 15, 2026	PDF	1,468	±2.6%	24.3	5.6	22.7	31.9	12.9	2.6	7.6
Synopsis	May 10, 2026	PDF	1,000	—N/a	18	8	30	30	13	1	Tie
Pallas Data	May 9, 2026	PDF	1,176	±2.9%	18.9	8.1	28.5	28.3	14.3	1.9	0.2
Liaison Strategies	April 27, 2026	PDF	1,000	±3.1%	16	7	32	32	11	2	Tie
Leger	April 20, 2026	PDF	1,030	±3.04%	17	8	31	28	14	1	3
Pallas Data	April 14, 2026	PDF	956	±3.2%	14.4	10.6	28.5	31.8	13.7	1.1	3.3
Christine Fréchette is elected as leader of the Coalition Avenir Québec on April 12, 2026.
Leger	April 6, 2026	HTML	1,036	±3.04%	13	8	32	33	12	2	1
Leger	March 22, 2026	PDF	1,003	±3.1%	9	9	33	33	15	1	Tie
Leger	March 2, 2026	HTML	1,021	—N/a	13	9	31	30	15	2	1
PQ wins the by-election in Chicoutimi on February 23, 2026.
Pallas Data	February 22, 2026	PDF	1,075	±3%	13.7	10.2	30.1	27.1	16.4	2.4	3
Charles Milliard is acclaimed as leader of the Quebec Liberal Party on February 13, 2026.
Innovative Research	February 1, 2026	HTML	651	—N/a	14	6	31	26	18	5	5
Leger	January 29, 2026	HTML	1,000	±3.04%	17	7	32	26	14	3	6
François Legault announces his pending resignation as leader of the CAQ and premier on January 14, 2026.
Pallas Data	January 10, 2026	HTML	1,128	±3%	11	11	34	24	16	3	10
Pablo Rodriguez resigns as leader of the Quebec Liberal Party on December 17, 2025.
Leger	December 15, 2025	PDF	1,039	±3.04%	19	9	35	20	16	2	15
Angus Reid	December 1, 2025	HTML	538	—N/a	13	10	40	18	16	3	22
Leger	December 1, 2025	PDF	1,042	±3.04%	18	8	39	21	13	1	18
Pallas Data	November 25, 2025	PDF	1,102	±3%	12.8	9.2	35.5	24.7	14.7	3.1	10.8
Leger	November 10, 2025	HTML	1,031	±3.1%	17	8	32	27	14	2	5
Sol Zanetti is elected co-spokesperson of Québec solidaire on November 8, 2025.
Pallas Data (Note: Sponsored by the Conservative Party of Quebec)	October 19, 2025	PDF	1,234	±2.9%	12.5	10.3	33.3	26.1	13.9	3.9	7.2
Leger	September 28, 2025	HTML	1,037	±3.04%	16	6	36	25	15	2	11
Leger	September 15, 2025	PDF	1,053	±3.02%	16	7	38	27	11	1	11
Pallas Data	September 6, 2025	PDF	1,187	±2.8%	10.8	7.9	38	26.7	14.8	1.8	11.3
Angus Reid	September 5, 2025	HTML	524	—N/a	12	11	38	21	16	3	17
Leger	August 18, 2025	HTML	977	±3.1%	17	9	35	26	10	2	9
PQ wins the by-election in Arthabaska on August 11, 2025.
Mainstreet Research	June 24, 2025	PDF	910	±3.2%	16	8	31	29	14	2	2
Leger	June 22, 2025	PDF	1,056	±3.0%	17	9	30	28	14	2	2
Pallas Data	June 16, 2025	HTML	1,085	±3.0%	15	12	31	26	14	2	5
Pablo Rodriguez is elected as leader of the Quebec Liberal Party on June 14, 2025.
Leger	May 11, 2025	HTML	1,051	±3.02%	20	10	33	21	13	2	12
Gabriel Nadeau-Dubois resigns as co-spokesperson of Québec solidaire on March 20, 2025.
PQ wins the by-election in Terrebonne on March 17, 2025.
Leger	March 10, 2025	PDF	1,007	±3.09%	24	12	30	19	12	3	6
Pallas Data	March 1, 2025	PDF	1,120	±2.9%	19.5	10.1	31.6	21.6	15	2.2	10
Leger	February 2, 2025	PDF	1,017	±3.07%	21	10	30	21	14	3	9
Leger (Note: Sponsored by the Bloc Québécois)	January 19, 2025	HTML	1,003	±3.09%	25	12	34	15	11	(Note: Not specified in the Canadian Press article)	9
Leger	December 2, 2024	PDF	1,002	±3.1%	24	13	31	16	13	3	7
Pallas Data	November 26, 2024	PDF	1,093	±3.0%	20.4	11.9	35.0	18.3	12.8	1.6	14.6
Ruba Ghazal is elected co-spokesperson of Québec solidaire on November 16, 2024.
Leger	November 11, 2024	PDF	1,010	±3.08%	21	13	35	17	11	2	14
Leger	October 6, 2024	PDF	1,036	±3.04%	24	14	32	17	12	1	8
Pallas Data	September 26, 2024	PDF	1,111	±2.9%	21.6	11.7	33.9	17.6	14.0	1.2	12.3
Pallas Data	September 3, 2024	HTML	1,191	±3.0%	23	13	31	17	14	—N/a	8
Leger	August 25, 2024	PDF	1,041	±3.04%	24	15	29	16	13	3	5
Pallas Data	June 22, 2024	PDF	1,445	±2.6%	21.7	13.2	35.0	16.7	12.2	1.2	13.3
Pallas Data	June 8, 2024	PDF	1,339	±2.7%	21.5	15.9	33.1	17.1	10.6	1.8	11.6
Leger	June 3, 2024	PDF	1,015	±3.08%	25	14	32	15	10	3	7
Leger	May 13, 2024	PDF	1,031	±3.05%	22	12	32	17	12	4	10
Émilise Lessard-Therrien resigns as co-spokesperson of Québec solidaire on April 29, 2024.
Leger	April 21, 2024	PDF	1,026	±3.06%	24	14	34	15	10	3	10
Pallas Data	April 21, 2024	PDF	1,256	±2.8%	19.5	12.9	32.9	22.8	10.7	1.2	10.1
Leger	March 18, 2024	PDF	1,033	±3.05%	22	18	34	14	10	2	12
Pallas Data	February 24, 2024	PDF	1,122	±2.9%	23.1	16.5	31.4	14.5	12.8	1.7	8.3
Leger	February 5, 2024	PDF	1,032	±3.05%	25	16	32	15	11	1	7
Pallas Data	January 24, 2024	PDF	1,175	±2.9%	21.1	17.0	31.7	15.4	11.5	3.2	10.6
Leger	December 4, 2023	PDF	1,040	±3.04%	25	17	31	14	11	2	6
Émilise Lessard-Therrien is elected as co-spokesperson of Québec solidaire on November 26, 2023, following the resignation of Manon Massé.
Pallas Data	November 18, 2023	PDF	1,178	±2.86%	24.1	16.1	30.4	15.5	11.3	2.7	6.3
Leger	October 30, 2023	PDF	1,026	±3.06%	30	15	26	15	12	3	4
PQ wins the by-election in Jean-Talon on October 2, 2023.
Pallas Data	September 27, 2023	PDF	1,095	±3.0%	34.5	15.4	19.0	14.7	14.6	1.9	15.5
Leger	September 25, 2023	PDF	1,028	±3.06%	34	17	22	14	12	1	12
Leger	August 21, 2023	PDF	1,036	±3.0%	37	15	22	12	11	3	15
Leger	June 12, 2023	PDF	1,042	±3.0%	37	16	23	13	9	2	14
Angus Reid	June 3, 2023	PDF	506	—N/a	33	17	22	13	12	3 (Note: Including PVQ at 2%)	11
Leger	May 1, 2023	PDF	1,201	±3.0%	36	16	22	14	10	2	14
The Coalition Avenir Québec announces it is scrapping plans for a multi-purpose vehicle highway on the proposed Third Link project between Quebec City and Lévis. Troisième lien entre Québec et Lévis thereby breaking an 2018,2022 Election promise on April, 2023.
QS wins the by-election in Saint-Henri–Sainte-Anne on March 13, 2023.
Leger	February 26, 2023	PDF	1,044	±3.0%	40	17	18	14	9	2	22
Leger	December 10, 2022	PDF	1,002	±3.1%	41	14	18	14	10	3	23
Leger	November 6, 2022	PDF	1,028	±3.1%	36	19	18	14	11	3	17
2022 election	October 3, 2022		4,169,137		41.0	15.4	14.6	14.4	12.9	1.7	25.6

=== Polling by language ===
Voting intentions among French speakers

Voting intentions among non-French speakers

Timeline of opinion polls by language
Date(s)	Firm	Language	Sample	CAQ	Liberal	PQ	QS	PCQ	Other	Ref.
October 3, 2026	Léger	Francophone	682	15%	15%	35%	14%	19%	2%	PDF
October 3, 2026	Léger	Non-francophone	152	9%	56%	9%	5%	20%	1%	PDF
September 27, 2026	Léger	Francophone	682	18%	14%	37%	10%	19%	1%	PDF
September 27, 2026	Léger	Non-francophone	152	10%	63%	7%	8%	12%	0%	PDF
September 21, 2026	Léger	Francophone	682	24%	11%	37%	9%	18%	1%	PDF
September 21, 2026	Léger	Non-francophone	152	7%	60%	6%	11%	15%	2%	PDF
September 19, 2026	Pallas	Francophone	682	23%	14%	34%	12%	16%	0%	PDF
September 19, 2026	Pallas	Non-francophone	152	18%	51%	7%	7%	15%	2%	PDF
September 13, 2026	ResearchCo	Francophone	682	29%	13%	33%	9%	15%	1%	PDF
September 13, 2026	ResearchCo	Non-francophone	152	9%	42%	12%	14%	21%	2%	PDF
September 13, 2026	Synopsis	Francophone	682	27%	14%	34%	12%	13%	1%	PDF
September 13, 2026	Synopsis	Non-francophone	152	12%	51%	9%	10%	15%	3%	PDF
September 13, 2026	Léger	Francophone	682	25%	10%	35%	12%	17%	1%	PDF
September 13, 2026	Léger	Non-francophone	152	9%	61%	6%	4%	17%	2%	PDF
September 6, 2026	Léger	Francophone	682	26%	12%	35%	11%	15%	1%	PDF
September 6, 2026	Léger	Non-francophone	152	11%	55%	9%	9%	15%	1%	PDF
August 31, 2026	Léger	Francophone	682	27%	10%	35%	10%	16%	0%	PDF
August 31, 2026	Léger	Non-francophone	152	14%	57%	9%	7%	12%	1%	PDF
August 24, 2026	Léger	Francophone	682	26%	14%	38%	6%	15%	1%	PDF
August 24, 2026	Léger	Non-francophone	152	12%	50%	8%	9%	20%	1%	PDF
August 9, 2026	Léger	Francophone	669	25%	13%	36%	11%	14%	2%	PDF
August 9, 2026	Léger	Non-francophone	149	7%	55%	11%	9%	11%	4%	PDF
August 2, 2026	Pallas	Francophone	988	19%	19%	34%	12%	16%	0%	PDF
August 2, 2026	Pallas	Non-francophone	133	18%	52%	19%	3%	7%	7%	PDF
June 15, 2026	Léger	Francophone	714	23%	20%	35%	8%	14%	1%	PDF
June 15, 2026	Léger	Non-francophone	118	13%	53%	12%	8%	10%	5%	PDF
June 12, 2026	Pallas	Francophone	957	25%	15%	34%	11%	14%	1%	PDF
June 12, 2026	Pallas	Non-francophone	142	5%	55%	12%	12%	13%	3%	PDF
May 18, 2026	Léger	Francophone	676	26%	17%	37%	9%	11%	1%	PDF
May 18, 2026	Léger	Non-francophone	163	12%	59%	12%	6%	11%	1%	PDF
May 9, 2026	Pallas	Francophone	1026	22%	20%	35%	9%	13%	1%	PDF
May 9, 2026	Pallas	Non-francophone	150	10%	56%	8%	5%	18%	3%	PDF
April 20, 2026	Léger	Francophone	685	21%	19%	38%	9%	12%	1%	PDF
April 20, 2026	Léger	Non-francophone	157	5%	57%	11%	6%	18%	2%	PDF
April 14, 2026	Pallas	Francophone	840	18%	21%	34%	13%	13%	1%	PDF
April 14, 2026	Pallas	Non-francophone	116	4%	64%	13%	4%	15%	0%	PDF
April 6, 2026	Léger	Francophone	701	15%	22%	39%	9%	12%	2%	PDF
April 6, 2026	Léger	Non-francophone	157	4%	65%	11%	4%	13%	3%	PDF
March 22, 2026	Léger	Francophone	674	11%	23%	41%	10%	14%	1%	PDF
March 22, 2026	Léger	Non-francophone	129	3%	61%	10%	7%	18%	1%	PDF
March 3, 2026	Léger	Francophone	674	17%	19%	39%	10%	15%	1%	PDF
March 3, 2026	Léger	Non-francophone	129	6%	65%	6%	7%	16%	3%	PDF
February 22, 2026	Pallas	Francophone	957	16%	18%	37%	12%	15%	2%	PDF
February 22, 2026	Pallas	Non-francophone	118	8%	57%	6%	4%	22%	3%	PDF
November 25, 2025	Pallas	Francophone	978	14%	15%	44%	11%	15%	2%	PDF
November 25, 2025	Pallas	Non-francophone	124	7%	60%	6%	5%	14%	9%	PDF
September 15, 2025	Léger	Francophone	678	19%	15%	46%	9%	15%	1%	PDF
September 15, 2025	Léger	Non-francophone	118	6%	65%	12%	1%	11%	4%	PDF
June 22, 2025	Léger	Francophone	750	20%	18%	38%	9%	14%	2%	PDF
June 22, 2025	Léger	Non-francophone	141	8%	58%	7%	9%	15%	3%	PDF
March 10, 2025	Léger	Francophone	720	25%	10%	37%	13%	12%	2%	PDF
March 10, 2025	Léger	Non-francophone	141	22%	49%	8%	8%	11%	1%	PDF
December 2, 2024	Léger	Francophone	678	25%	7%	40%	14%	12%	2%	PDF
December 2, 2024	Léger	Non-francophone	118	18%	45%	4%	8%	17%	9%	PDF
November 26, 2024	Pallas	Francophone	966	23%	9%	42%	13%	11%	1%	PDF
November 26, 2024	Pallas	Non-francophone	133	11%	48%	14%	8%	18%	2%	PDF
November 11, 2024	Léger	Francophone	704	24%	5%	44%	15%	11%	1%	PDF
November 11, 2024	Léger	Non-francophone	125	13%	54%	8%	6%	13%	7%	PDF
October 6, 2024	Léger	Francophone	665	29%	7%	38%	15%	10%	1%	PDF
October 6, 2024	Léger	Non-francophone	153	9%	50%	12%	9%	19%	1%	PDF
August 25, 2024	Léger	Francophone	722	28%	7%	37%	16%	11%	1%	PDF
August 25, 2024	Léger	Non-francophone	141	14%	44%	6%	11%	19%	6%	PDF
June 3, 2024	Léger	Francophone	672	29%	6%	40%	16%	8%	2%	PDF
June 3, 2024	Léger	Non-francophone	143	12%	46%	7%	9%	18%	8%	PDF
May 13, 2024	Léger	Francophone	687	26%	6%	40%	15%	11%	2%	PDF
May 13, 2024	Léger	Non-francophone	132	9%	51%	9%	5%	15%	12%	PDF
April 21, 2024	Léger	Francophone	683	27%	6%	42%	15%	8%	2%	PDF
April 21, 2024	Léger	Non-francophone	166	12%	43%	9%	14%	17%	5%	PDF
March 18, 2024	Léger	Francophone	709	25%	4%	42%	20%	7%	2%	PDF
March 18, 2024	Léger	Non-francophone	127	10%	51%	7%	13%	18%	2%	PDF
February 5, 2024	Léger	Francophone	723	28%	7%	38%	17%	10%	1%	PDF
February 5, 2024	Léger	Non-francophone	148	14%	47%	10%	12%	14%	3%	PDF
December 4, 2023	Léger	Francophone	680	31%	5%	37%	18%	9%	1%	PDF
December 4, 2023	Léger	Non-francophone	170	7%	44%	9%	14%	21%	5%	PDF
October 30, 2023	Léger	Francophone	676	35%	6%	31%	17%	9%	2%	PDF
October 30, 2023	Léger	Non-francophone	174	14%	46%	7%	6%	20%	6%	PDF
September 25, 2023	Léger	Francophone	669	39%	5%	27%	20%	7%	1%	PDF
September 25, 2023	Léger	Non-francophone	163	19%	39%	6%	7%	26%	3%	PDF
August 21, 2023	Léger	Francophone	?	42%	5%	27%	16%	8%	2%	PDF
August 21, 2023	Léger	Non-francophone	?	19%	40%	5%	9%	20%	7%	PDF
June 12, 2023	Léger	Francophone	685	41%	4%	29%	17%	8%	1%	PDF
June 12, 2023	Léger	Non-francophone	185	23%	44%	4%	13%	12%	4%	PDF
May 1, 2023	Léger	Francophone	816	42%	5%	26%	17%	9%	1%	PDF
May 1, 2023	Léger	Non-francophone	165	18%	42%	7%	12%	15%	7%	PDF
February 26, 2023	Léger	Francophone	707	46%	4%	23%	19%	8%	1%	PDF
February 26, 2023	Léger	Non-francophone	174	20%	46%	2%	12%	14%	6%	PDF
December 10, 2022	Léger	Francophone	705	48%	6%	22%	14%	8%	2%	PDF
December 10, 2022	Léger	Non-francophone	182	21%	41%	5%	12%	14%	7%	PDF
November 6, 2022	Léger	Francophone	709	41%	5%	22%	20%	10%	2%	PDF
November 6, 2022	Léger	Non-francophone	180	15%	46%	4%	14%	13%	8%	PDF

Hypothetical polling

Voting intention with Coalition Avenir Québec leadership candidates

Bernard Drainville as leader

Polling organisation	Last date of polling	Source	Sample size	MoE	CAQ	QS	PQ	Liberal	PCQ	Other	Lead
Léger	March 30, 2026		1061	3.01%	10	10	34	31	11	3	3
Léger	January 29, 2026		742	–	15	9	34	24	14	4	10

Christine Fréchette as leader

Polling organisation	Last date of polling	Source	Sample size	MoE	CAQ	QS	PQ	Liberal	PCQ	Other	Lead
Léger	March 30, 2026		1061	3.01%	16	10	32	28	12	2	4
Léger	January 29, 2026		765	–	25	7	30	21	14	3	5

Voting intention with Liberal leadership candidates

Karl Blackburn as leader

Polling organisation	Last date of polling	Source	Sample size	MoE	CAQ	QS	PQ	Liberal	PCQ	Other	Lead
Leger	May 13, 2025	PDF	706		20	10	32	25	11	3	7
Leger	November 11, 2024	PDF	1,010	±3.08%	17	12	36	20	12	3	16
Leger	October 6, 2024	PDF	1,036	±3.04%	27	12	27	21	10	2	0
Leger	August 25, 2024	PDF	1,041	±3.04%	23	14	30	16	12	4	7
Leger	February 5, 2024	PDF	1,032	±3.05%	23	14	31	21	9	3	8

Charles Milliard as leader

Polling organisation	Last date of polling	Source	Sample size	MoE	CAQ	QS	PQ	Liberal	PCQ	Other	Lead
Leger	May 13, 2025	PDF	691		19	11	32	22	12	4	10
Leger	November 11, 2024	PDF	1,010	±3.08%	20	13	36	16	13	2	16
Leger	August 25, 2024	PDF	1,041	±3.04%	23	15	31	14	13	4	8

Pablo Rodriguez as leader

Polling organisation	Last date of polling	Source	Sample size	MoE	CAQ	QS	PQ	Liberal	PCQ	Other	Lead
Leger	May 13, 2025	PDF	733		16	8	30	31	11	3	1
Leger	November 11, 2024	PDF	1,010	±3.08%	15	11	33	26	12	1	7
Leger	October 6, 2024	PDF	1,036	±3.04%	25	11	26	28	9	2	2
Leger	August 25, 2024	PDF	1,041	±3.04%	23	13	30	19	11	3	7

=== Projections ===
Source	Seat ranking						
Source	PQ	Liberal	PCQ	QS	CAQ	As of	Projection
338Canada	63 (50–74)	37 (33–44)	18 (10–27)	9 (2–12)	0 (0–2)	October 5, 2026	PQ minority
Polling Canada	64 (57–72)	37 (33–39)	18 (16–25)	6 (6–8)	2 (0–4)	October 4, 2026	PQ majority

Source	Popular vote ranking					
Source	PQ	Liberal	PCQ	CAQ	QS	As of
338Canada	29% (±4%)	24% (±3%)	20% (±3%)	16% (±3%)	11% (±2%)	October 5, 2026
Polling Canada	29%	24%	20%	16%	11%	October 4, 2026

== Results ==
Ici Radio-Canada Télé called the election for the PQ 40 minutes after counting began, with some news outlets declaring a PQ victory as early as 20 minutes after the polls closed.

Several results were in dispute:

- In Saint-Henri–Sainte-Anne, Liberal candidate Benoit Clermont had unseated Guillaume Cliche-Rivard of Québec Solidaire by just 39 votes. Cliche-Rivard had indicated the possibility of a legal challenge, but once vote verification lengthened Clermont's lead to 275, Cliche-Rivard stated that the "result is clear" and accepted the outcome.
- In Vachon, Liberal candidate Affine Lwalalika's 10,063 votes were just 10 more than those of Parti Québécois candidate Stephan Fogaing. As a result, the PQ requested a judicial recount, which was subsequently granted. On October 21, the recount determined that Fogaing won by three votes. On October 26, the Liberals announced that they would appeal the result.
- In Champlain, discrepancies were alleged to have occurred in the count, with roughly 80 votes missing from one ballot box and 30 from another. The PQ requested a recount in the district, and the Court of Quebec approved the application. After the presiding judge completed his recount of the 67 disputed ballot boxes, the PQ conceded defeat and both parties mutually agreed to terminate the recount. As a result, the existing results from the other 124 boxes were certified without any further counting.

Outside of the five main parties, only one candidate received 1,000 or more votes in this election, being Kevin Grenier of Démocratie directe in René-Lévesque, placing fifth.

Vote shares of principal parties (Quebec 2026)
PQ

PLQ

PCQ

QS

CAQ

Elections to the 44th Quebec Legislature (2026)
Party	Leader(s)	Candidates	Votes				Seats		
Party	Leader(s)	Candidates	#	±	%	Change (pp)	2022	2026	±
Parti Québécois	Paul St-Pierre Plamondon	127	1,200,394	▲599,686	28.02	▲13.41	3	60 / 127	▲57
Liberal	Charles Milliard	127	1,037,999	▲446,922	24.23	▲9.86	21	39 / 127	▲18
Conservative	Éric Duhaime	127	885,379	▲354,593	20.66	▲7.75	0	19 / 127	▲19
Québec solidaire	Ruba Ghazal & Sol Zanetti	127	532,093	▼102,442	12.42	▼3.01	11	9 / 127	▼2
Coalition Avenir Québec	Christine Fréchette	127	572,037	▼1,113,536	13.35	▼27.63	90	0 / 127	▼90
Green	Alex Tyrrell	37	12,107	▼18,947	0.28	▼0.47			
Climat Québec	Martine Ouellet	52	11,667	▲3,023	0.27	▲0.06			
Canadian	Joseph Cianflone	29	8,232	▼4,749	0.19	▼0.13			
Parti nul	Renaud Blais	38	8,136	▲7,062	0.19	▲0.16			
Démocratie directe	Jean Charles Cléroux	28	4,453	▲2,032	0.10	▲0.04			
Independent	—N/a	19	3,911	▲1,790	0.09	▲0.04			
Présence	Guillaume Tremblay	18	2,940	New	0.07	New			
Parti culinaire	Jean-Louis Thémis	4	948	▲592	0.02	▲0.01			
Libertarian	Charles Olivier	3	859	▲743	0.02	▲0.02			
Communist	Adrien Welsh	10	821	Returned	0.02	Returned			
Marxist–Leninist	Christine Dandenault (interim)	12	739	▲54	0.02	0.00			
Access, Property, and Equity Party	Shawn Lalande McLean	5	529	▲459	0.01	▲0.01			
Bloc Pot	Jean-Patrick Berthiaume	6	529	Returned	0.01	Returned			
Équipe Autonomiste	Louis Chandonnet	8	292	▼264	0.01	0.00			
Osons Québec	Ludovic Mbany	2	209	New	0.00	New			
Québec innovant	Alexandre St-Pierre	2	188	New	0.00	New			
Total		908	4,284,462	▲171,641	100%		125	127	▲2
Rejected ballots			63,241	▲6,925	1.45%	▲0.10%			
Turnout			4,347,703	▲178,566	66.92%	▲0.77%			
Registered electors			6,495,984	▲193,195	Sources				

=== Synopsis of results ===
Results by riding - 2026 Quebec general election (Note: Drawn from data at "Data archives". Élections Québec.)
Riding	Winning party								Turnout (Note: including spoilt ballots)	Votes (Note: All parties with more than 1% of the vote, or which obtained at least 1,000 votes in one riding, are shown individually. Independent candidates and other minor parties are aggregated separately. Parties are presented in the order of total votes received.)								
Name	2022	1st place	Votes	Share	Margin #	Margin %	2nd place	3rd place	Turnout	PQ	PLQ	PCQ	CAQ	QS	DD	Ind	Other	Total
Abitibi-Est	CAQ	PQ	7,192	34.65%	2,583	12.44%	PCQ	PLQ	63.29%	7,192	4,292	4,609	2,587	1,956	–	–	123	20,759
Abitibi-Ouest	CAQ	PQ	11,080	49.59%	7,035	31.48%	PCQ	CAQ	64.30%	11,080	1,827	4,045	3,433	1,959	–	–	–	22,344
Acadie	PLQ	PLQ	12,996	49.46%	7,837	29.82%	QS	PQ	53.14%	3,446	12,996	2,435	1,439	5,159	–	–	803	26,278
Anjou–Louis-Riel	CAQ	PLQ	10,242	40.05%	4,913	19.21%	PQ	QS	62.68%	5,329	10,242	2,405	3,572	3,733	–	–	293	25,574
Argenteuil	CAQ	PQ	8,956	33.13%	2,032	7.52%	PLQ	PCQ	63.75%	8,956	6,924	5,439	3,096	1,881	–	517	219	27,032
Arthabaska–L'Érable	CAQ	PCQ	18,432	40.55%	3,552	7.81%	PQ	CAQ	74.39%	14,880	3,431	18,432	6,047	2,293	80	–	296	45,459
Beauce-Nord	CAQ	PCQ	22,164	61.86%	16,724	46.68%	PLQ	PQ	77.56%	4,360	5,440	22,164	2,483	1,209	–	–	174	35,830
Beauce-Sud	CAQ	PCQ	21,966	58.19%	13,499	35.76%	CAQ	PQ	75.03%	3,398	2,940	21,966	8,467	896	81	–	–	37,748
Beauharnois	CAQ	PQ	17,913	44.87%	10,239	25.65%	CAQ	PCQ	67.89%	17,913	5,022	6,230	7,674	2,536	154	–	393	39,922
Bellechasse	CAQ	PCQ	22,527	63.84%	17,221	48.80%	PQ	CAQ	77.29%	5,306	2,621	22,527	3,301	1,447	84	–	–	35,286
Bellefeuille	New	PQ	12,985	41.59%	5,644	18.08%	PCQ	PLQ	70.06%	12,985	4,513	7,341	3,840	2,540	–	–	–	31,219
Berthier	CAQ	PQ	15,640	43.45%	7,823	21.73%	PCQ	CAQ	67.91%	15,640	3,183	7,817	5,476	3,253	177	–	447	35,993
Bertrand	CAQ	PQ	15,768	39.88%	8,406	21.26%	CAQ	PCQ	66.75%	15,768	5,603	5,746	7,362	4,550	183	–	323	39,535
Blainville	CAQ	PQ	15,000	33.69%	3,178	7.14%	PLQ	PCQ	72.36%	15,000	11,822	7,112	6,418	3,448	–	–	723	44,523
Bonaventure	CAQ	PQ	9,893	46.54%	5,297	24.92%	CAQ	PLQ	60.08%	9,893	2,928	2,026	4,596	1,813	–	–	–	21,256
Borduas	CAQ	PQ	15,949	35.30%	5,302	11.74%	CAQ	PLQ	77.83%	15,949	7,088	6,330	10,647	4,787	–	–	376	45,177
Bourassa-Sauvé	PLQ	PLQ	10,428	47.39%	6,710	30.49%	QS	PQ	50.98%	3,596	10,428	2,074	2,064	3,718	–	125	–	22,005
Brome-Missisquoi	CAQ	PLQ	13,007	32.47%	2,118	5.29%	PQ	PCQ	70.43%	10,889	13,007	6,445	5,249	3,585	–	–	878	40,053
Camille-Laurin	PQ	PQ	12,229	39.66%	5,423	17.59%	PLQ	QS	63.37%	12,229	6,806	2,371	2,688	6,247	–	–	494	30,835
Chambly	CAQ	PQ	13,885	34.28%	6,092	15.04%	PLQ	CAQ	75.33%	13,885	7,793	5,900	7,646	4,510	73	162	541	40,510
Champlain	CAQ	PCQ	12,690	29.27%	186	0.43%	PQ	CAQ	72.40%	12,504	6,511	12,690	7,395	2,906	151	–	1,200 (Note: Martine Ouellet, previously PQ MNA for Vachon (2010-2018), ran for Climat Québec and received 988 votes.)	43,357
Chapleau	CAQ	PLQ	12,816	37.46%	6,076	17.76%	PQ	CAQ	58.57%	6,740	12,816	5,471	5,652	2,911	–	–	626	34,216
Charlesbourg	CAQ	PCQ	16,882	38.49%	5,545	12.64%	PQ	PLQ	76.91%	11,337	5,956	16,882	5,171	4,114	–	–	405	43,865
Charlevoix–Côte-de-Beaupré	CAQ	PCQ	15,997	38.99%	5,491	13.38%	PQ	CAQ	74.04%	10,506	3,260	15,997	7,287	3,778	124	–	80	41,032
Châteauguay	CAQ	PLQ	12,343	35.76%	2,692	7.80%	PQ	CAQ	61.46%	9,651	12,343	4,251	4,663	3,037	–	–	569	34,514
Chauveau	CAQ	PCQ	22,026	47.88%	12,552	27.28%	PQ	PLQ	77.52%	9,474	5,825	22,026	4,497	3,860	–	–	325	46,007
Chicoutimi	CAQ	PQ	11,858	39.39%	6,336	21.05%	PCQ	CAQ	66.46%	11,858	4,408	5,522	4,956	2,965	–	–	397	30,106
Chomedey	PLQ	PLQ	12,807	45.17%	7,691	27.12%	PCQ	PQ	50.50%	3,761	12,807	5,116	2,522	2,917	–	952	281	28,356
Chutes-de-la-Chaudière	CAQ	PCQ	22,752	45.74%	11,339	22.79%	PQ	PLQ	80.99%	11,413	6,543	22,752	5,702	2,691	–	–	645	49,746
Côte-du-Sud	CAQ	PCQ	15,161	42.34%	6,601	18.44%	PQ	CAQ	71.73%	8,560	3,967	15,161	6,076	2,041	–	–	–	35,805
D'Arcy-McGee	PLQ	PLQ	16,442	60.74%	11,106	41.03%	PCQ	QS	48.10%	1,056	16,442	5,336	694	2,703	–	–	840	27,071
Daniel-Johnson	CAQ	PQ	11,983	34.70%	3,396	9.84%	PCQ	PLQ	71.15%	11,983	5,785	8,587	5,172	3,002	–	–	–	34,529
Deux-Montagnes	CAQ	PQ	12,575	36.42%	4,858	14.07%	PLQ	PCQ	69.60%	12,575	7,717	5,194	4,966	3,836	–	–	244	34,532
Drummond–Bois-Francs	CAQ	PQ	11,409	30.67%	466	1.25%	PCQ	CAQ	70.75%	11,409	4,516	10,943	7,233	2,586	–	–	517	37,204
Dubuc	CAQ	PQ	10,725	38.63%	2,831	10.20%	PCQ	CAQ	65.27%	10,725	3,151	7,894	3,987	1,804	–	–	202	27,763
Duplessis	CAQ	PQ	9,434	47.14%	4,884	24.40%	CAQ	PCQ	54.54%	9,434	1,080	3,909	4,550	984	–	–	56	20,013
Fabre	CAQ	PLQ	15,043	42.74%	8,075	22.94%	PQ	PCQ	60.73%	6,968	15,043	6,080	3,118	3,439	–	–	550	35,198
Gaspé	CAQ	PQ	10,525	58.81%	8,111	45.32%	CAQ	PLQ	60.21%	10,525	2,278	1,358	2,414	1,322	–	–	–	17,897
Gatineau	CAQ	PLQ	15,547	41.67%	7,239	19.40%	PQ	PCQ	60.84%	8,308	15,547	6,303	3,988	2,903	–	–	265	37,314
Gouin	QS	QS	19,431	62.61%	14,420	46.47%	PQ	PLQ	72.62%	5,011	3,976	1,063	953	19,431	–	–	600	31,034
Granby	CAQ	PQ	13,171	32.95%	4,918	12.30%	CAQ	PLQ	68.90%	13,171	7,553	6,971	8,253	3,645	–	–	381	39,974
Groulx	CAQ	PQ	11,742	32.17%	3,121	8.55%	PLQ	CAQ	68.41%	11,742	8,621	5,284	6,474	4,053	–	–	330	36,504
Hochelaga-Maisonneuve	QS	QS	14,033	52.01%	7,368	27.31%	PQ	PLQ	66.77%	6,665	3,311	1,240	1,176	14,033	57	–	500	26,982
Hull	CAQ	PLQ	14,582	42.50%	8,550	24.92%	QS	PQ	56.96%	5,798	14,582	3,639	4,072	6,032	–	–	185	34,308
Huntingdon	CAQ	PQ	10,110	30.48%	1,605	4.84%	PLQ	PCQ	67.04%	10,110	8,505	8,475	4,022	1,856	–	–	202	33,170
Iberville	CAQ	PQ	12,755	35.51%	4,807	13.38%	PCQ	CAQ	71.14%	12,755	4,631	7,948	6,762	3,085	–	–	740	35,921
Îles-de-la-Madeleine	PQ	PQ	5,061	66.54%	3,501	46.03%	PLQ	QS	69.32%	5,061	1,560	202	330	338	–	–	115	7,606
Jacques-Cartier	PLQ	PLQ	22,456	73.21%	19,147	62.42%	PCQ	QS	63.60%	1,329	22,456	3,309	881	1,696	–	–	1,004	30,675
Jean-Lesage	QS	QS	10,847	35.67%	3,657	12.03%	PCQ	PQ	69.11%	6,412	2,754	7,190	2,845	10,847	–	–	359	30,407
Jean-Talon	CAQ	PLQ	11,522	31.76%	907	2.50%	PQ	PCQ	76.55%	10,615	11,522	5,680	2,968	5,121	35	–	341	36,282
Jeanne-Mance–Viger	PLQ	PLQ	17,357	64.06%	14,050	51.85%	QS	PCQ	55.32%	2,266	17,357	2,622	1,204	3,307	–	–	340 (Note: Djaouida Sellah formerly MP for Saint-Bruno—Saint-Hubert (2011-2015), stood for the Canadian Party of Quebec and received 165 votes.)	27,096
Joliette	CAQ	PQ	18,368	45.04%	11,141	27.32%	CAQ	PCQ	69.99%	18,368	3,775	7,138	7,227	3,541	–	–	734	40,783
Jonquière	CAQ	PQ	11,101	36.34%	916	3.00%	CAQ	PCQ	68.32%	11,101	1,639	5,244	10,185	2,223	–	–	159	30,551
L'Assomption	CAQ	PQ	16,351	41.09%	9,081	22.82%	PCQ	CAQ	70.82%	16,351	5,378	7,270	6,705	3,762	–	–	323	39,789
La Peltrie	CAQ	PCQ	21,826	48.17%	13,285	29.32%	PQ	PLQ	76.61%	8,541	7,112	21,826 (Note: Maïté Blanchette Vézina was previously the CAQ MNA for Rimouski.)	4,157	3,220	–	–	455	45,311
La Pinière	PLQ	PLQ	17,248	50.05%	12,279	35.63%	PQ	PCQ	59.15%	4,969	17,248	4,234	3,371	3,848	–	–	790	34,460
La Prairie	CAQ	PLQ	11,370	31.01%	651	1.78%	PQ	CAQ	73.02%	10,719	11,370	4,989	6,087	3,242	–	–	255	36,662
Labelle	CAQ	PQ	14,016	39.85%	7,343	20.88%	PCQ	CAQ	65.90%	14,016	4,326	6,673	6,672	2,860	233	–	392	35,172
Lac-Saint-Jean	CAQ	PQ	13,676	45.61%	6,988	23.30%	PCQ	CAQ	68.05%	13,676	2,716	6,688	4,549	2,043	–	–	315	29,987
LaFontaine	PLQ	PLQ	14,893	58.86%	11,475	45.35%	PCQ	PQ	60.41%	2,654	14,893	3,418	1,514	2,448	–	–	376	25,303
Laurier-Dorion	QS	QS	14,577	50.66%	6,544	22.74%	PLQ	PQ	65.48%	3,494	8,033	1,280	704	14,577	52	–	636	28,776
Laval-des-Rapides	CAQ	PLQ	12,034	36.38%	4,528	13.69%	PQ	QS	59.30%	7,506	12,034	3,888	3,875	5,339	–	–	433	33,075
Laviolette–Saint-Maurice	CAQ	PQ	12,142	31.35%	1,531	3.95%	PCQ	PLQ	64.82%	12,142	6,620	10,611	6,056	2,644	135	–	525	38,733
Les Plaines	CAQ	PQ	12,983	38.98%	5,961	17.90%	PCQ	PLQ	68.22%	12,983	5,464	7,022	4,198	2,894	224	521	–	33,306
Lévis	CAQ	PCQ	15,375	38.53%	6,500	16.29%	PQ	CAQ	74.86%	8,875	5,381	15,375	6,835	3,146	–	–	293	39,905
Lotbinière-Frontenac	CAQ	PCQ	23,976	54.39%	15,858	35.97%	PQ	PLQ	74.99%	8,118	5,647	23,976	4,154	1,827	154	–	205	44,081
Louis-Hébert	CAQ	PCQ	11,571	29.07%	964	2.42%	PQ	PLQ	83.31%	10,607	9,048	11,571	5,196	3,163	–	154	71	39,810
Marguerite-Bourgeoys	PLQ	PLQ	14,605	52.62%	10,372	37.37%	PQ	QS	52.92%	4,233	14,605	3,244	1,929	3,382	–	–	361	27,754
Marie-Lacoste-Gérin-Lajoie	New	PQ	11,323	36.13%	2,770	8.84%	PCQ	PLQ	68.75%	11,323	4,612	8,553	4,305	2,160	115	117	153	31,338
Marie-Victorin	CAQ	PQ	9,205	33.34%	3,423	12.40%	QS	PLQ	63.01%	9,205	5,600	2,832	3,722	5,782	–	–	465	27,606
Marquette	PLQ	PLQ	14,498	55.29%	10,651	40.62%	PQ	QS	58.26%	3,847	14,498	2,703	1,761	2,776	–	–	635	26,220
Maskinongé	CAQ	PQ	11,099	31.96%	1,709	4.92%	PCQ	CAQ	72.85%	11,099	4,606	9,390	6,830	2,365	79	89	272	34,730
Masson	CAQ	PQ	15,609	40.27%	8,472	21.86%	PLQ	PCQ	71.34%	15,609	7,137	6,694	6,034	3,283	–	–	–	38,757
Matane-Matapédia-Mitis	PQ	PQ	19,801	67.77%	15,910	54.45%	PCQ	PLQ	63.48%	19,801	1,974	3,891	1,927	1,347	103	–	174	29,217
Maurice-Richard	QS	PLQ	9,771	31.07%	309	0.98%	QS	PQ	69.32%	7,763	9,771	1,703	2,550	9,462	–	–	199	31,448
Mégantic	CAQ	PCQ	12,290	34.29%	3,335	9.30%	PQ	CAQ	69.99%	8,955	4,346	12,290	7,184	2,532	235	–	302	35,844
Mercier	QS	QS	17,761	59.20%	11,930	39.77%	PLQ	PQ	66.46%	3,766	5,831	1,001	975	17,761	–	25	642	30,001
Mille-Îles	PLQ	PLQ	14,512	44.32%	7,408	22.62%	PQ	PCQ	66.33%	7,104	14,512	4,139	3,111	3,768	–	–	112	32,746
Mirabel	CAQ	PQ	15,433	39.81%	7,252	18.71%	PCQ	PLQ	71.32%	15,433	6,214	8,181	5,578	3,006	–	–	352	38,764
Mont-Royal–Outremont	PLQ	PLQ	16,196	50.94%	9,602	30.20%	QS	PQ	54.34%	3,730	16,196	2,883	1,690	6,594	–	–	704	31,797
Montarville	CAQ	PLQ	12,775	29.62%	336	0.78%	PQ	CAQ	80.74%	12,439	12,775	3,677	8,594	5,046	–	188	408	43,127
Montmorency	CAQ	PCQ	19,482	43.81%	9,531	21.43%	PQ	CAQ	77.22%	9,951	5,145	19,482	5,689	3,853	–	–	346	44,466
Nelligan	PLQ	PLQ	21,690	63.70%	16,818	49.39%	PCQ	PQ	58.97%	2,563	21,690	4,872	1,663	2,301	–	–	963	34,052
Nicolet-Bécancour	CAQ	PCQ	12,574	41.21%	3,786	12.41%	PQ	CAQ	75.20%	8,788	2,438	12,574	4,988	1,364	–	85	276	30,513
Notre-Dame-de-Grâce	PLQ	PLQ	16,355	61.04%	11,594	43.27%	QS	PCQ	57.09%	1,586	16,355	2,126	767	4,761	–	–	1,201	26,796
Orford	CAQ	PLQ	13,080	37.80%	4,416	12.76%	PQ	PCQ	72.95%	8,664	13,080	4,785	4,113	3,349	–	–	611	34,602
Papineau	CAQ	PQ	11,181	30.17%	556	1.50%	PLQ	PCQ	61.65%	11,181	10,625	8,143	4,167	2,625	–	316	–	37,057
Pierre-Laporte	CAQ	PLQ	14,535	42.89%	7,168	21.15%	PQ	QS	64.53%	7,367	14,535	3,110	3,160	5,003	–	–	717	33,892
Pointe-aux-Trembles	CAQ	PQ	9,882	38.08%	5,039	19.42%	CAQ	PLQ	65.60%	9,882	4,586	3,020	4,843	3,299	–	–	322	25,952
Pontiac	PLQ	PLQ	18,358	61.36%	14,985	50.09%	PCQ	PQ	53.51%	3,236	18,358	3,373	1,686	2,862	–	–	402	29,917
Portneuf	CAQ	PCQ	21,817	51.58%	14,272	33.74%	CAQ	PQ	76.00%	6,559	3,200	21,817	7,545	2,760	108	–	305	42,294
Prévost	CAQ	PQ	14,554	38.61%	7,189	19.07%	PCQ	CAQ	71.70%	14,554	5,941	7,365	6,585	3,085	165	–	–	37,695
René-Lévesque	CAQ	PQ	9,415	50.72%	6,201	33.41%	CAQ	PCQ	58.91%	9,415	898	2,541	3,214	1,365	1,130	–	–	18,563
Repentigny	CAQ	PQ	14,604	36.21%	5,850	14.50%	CAQ	PLQ	72.11%	14,604	7,554	5,158	8,754	3,931	–	–	332	40,333
Richelieu	CAQ	PQ	15,074	41.26%	7,222	19.77%	CAQ	PCQ	68.78%	15,074	3,916	6,704	7,852	2,482	155	–	352	36,535
Richmond	CAQ	PQ	12,718	29.23%	2,762	6.35%	PCQ	PLQ	74.27%	12,718	9,906	9,956	5,767	4,597	–	197	367	43,508
Rimouski	CAQ	PQ	14,189	43.35%	8,393	25.64%	CAQ	QS	71.15%	14,189	3,095	4,322	5,796	4,923	–	–	405	32,730
Rivière-du-Loup–Témiscouata–Les Basques	CAQ	PQ	12,745	35.29%	4,439	12.29%	PCQ	CAQ	70.23%	12,745	5,189	8,306	7,110	2,434	–	–	330	36,114
Robert-Baldwin	PLQ	PLQ	19,984	65.05%	15,331	49.90%	PCQ	QS	56.27%	1,505	19,984	4,653	1,035	2,705	–	–	841	30,723
Roberval	CAQ	PQ	10,168	36.53%	2,912	10.46%	PCQ	CAQ	63.39%	10,168	3,736	7,256	5,202	1,473	–	–	–	27,835
Rosemont	QS	QS	14,168	39.22%	4,082	11.30%	PQ	PLQ	70.19%	10,086	7,177	1,871	2,468	14,168	–	134	224	36,128
Rousseau	CAQ	PQ	13,634	44.07%	4,989	16.13%	PCQ	CAQ	64.06%	13,634	2,513	8,645	3,932	2,211	–	–	–	30,935
Rouyn-Noranda–Témiscamingue	CAQ	PQ	10,251	36.62%	5,013	17.91%	CAQ	PCQ	63.87%	10,251	3,176	5,121	5,238	3,952	–	–	256	27,994
Saint-François	CAQ	PQ	9,709	26.03%	809	2.17%	PLQ	PCQ	68.67%	9,709	8,900	6,611	6,217	5,416	–	–	441	37,294
Saint-Henri–Sainte-Anne	PLQ	PLQ	13,341	37.20%	275	0.77%	QS	PQ	60.13%	4,740	13,341	2,631	1,563	13,066	–	–	523	35,864
Saint-Hyacinthe	CAQ	PQ	15,354	39.07%	8,366	21.29%	PCQ	CAQ	71.87%	15,354	6,267	6,988	6,835	3,470	–	–	382	39,296
Saint-Jean	CAQ	PQ	15,061	35.62%	7,155	16.92%	PLQ	CAQ	69.81%	15,061	7,906	6,950	7,146	4,409	109	–	697	42,278
Saint-Jérôme	CAQ	PQ	11,232	39.50%	6,077	21.37%	PCQ	CAQ	63.06%	11,232	3,732	5,155	4,690	3,330	–	–	300	28,439
Saint-Laurent	PLQ	PLQ	16,681	54.45%	11,614	37.91%	QS	PCQ	52.01%	2,570	16,681	3,781	1,425	5,067	–	77	1,034	30,635
Sainte-Marie–Saint-Jacques	QS	QS	10,921	43.15%	4,492	17.75%	PLQ	PQ	59.45%	5,055	6,429	1,135	1,062	10,921	–	–	708	25,310
Sainte-Rose	CAQ	PLQ	14,123	37.48%	5,145	13.65%	PQ	PCQ	65.55%	8,978	14,123	5,009	4,836	4,368	–	–	369	37,683
Sanguinet	CAQ	PQ	13,331	41.59%	7,221	22.53%	PLQ	PCQ	71.50%	13,331	6,110	5,008	4,590	2,877	–	–	137	32,053
Sherbrooke	QS	QS	10,101	27.22%	532	1.43%	PLQ	PQ	70.17%	8,927	9,569	3,830	4,029	10,101	62	–	597	37,115
Soulanges	CAQ	PLQ	14,174	35.51%	4,050	10.15%	PQ	PCQ	68.61%	10,124	14,174	7,067	5,527	2,406	136	–	485	39,919
Taillon	CAQ	PQ	11,326	32.11%	2,047	5.80%	PLQ	CAQ	68.40%	11,326	9,279	3,599	5,460	5,284	–	–	320	35,268
Taschereau	QS	QS	15,020	41.77%	5,939	16.51%	PQ	PLQ	74.44%	9,081	5,043	4,140	2,378	15,020	–	121	179	35,962
Terrebonne	CAQ	PQ	15,336	39.51%	7,633	19.67%	PLQ	PCQ	71.21%	15,336	7,703	6,020	5,788	3,665	–	–	300	38,812
Trois-Rivières	CAQ	PQ	10,107	27.10%	499	1.34%	CAQ	PCQ	69.75%	10,107	6,220	6,745	9,608	4,181	–	–	438	37,299
Ungava	CAQ	PQ	3,272	39.23%	963	11.55%	PLQ	PCQ	27.61%	3,272	2,309	1,447	863	450	–	–	–	8,341
Vachon	CAQ	PQ	10,023	27.51%	3	0.01%	PLQ	CAQ	68.43%	10,023	10,020	4,721	7,607	3,800	–	–	260	36,431
Vanier-Les Rivières	CAQ	PCQ	16,502	36.97%	5,852	13.11%	PQ	PLQ	75.65%	10,650	7,520	16,502	5,727	3,730	56	–	448	44,633
Vaudreuil	PLQ	PLQ	18,783	46.75%	10,803	26.89%	PQ	PCQ	65.05%	7,980	18,783	5,715	4,263	2,927	–	–	509	40,177
Verchères	CAQ	PQ	17,105	39.90%	9,466	22.08%	CAQ	PLQ	77.23%	17,105	6,520	6,308	7,639	4,981	–	–	320	42,873
Verdun	QS	PLQ	12,373	37.77%	710	2.17%	QS	PQ	66.19%	4,528	12,373	1,952	1,680	11,663	–	40	523	32,759
Viau	PLQ	PLQ	8,697	42.45%	2,836	13.84%	QS	PQ	52.92%	2,895	8,697	1,447	977	5,861	–	91	522	20,490
Vimont-Auteuil	CAQ	PLQ	13,535	42.76%	6,914	21.84%	PQ	PCQ	68.28%	6,621	13,535	4,000	3,997	3,085	–	–	416	31,654
Westmount–Saint-Louis	PLQ	PLQ	14,532	59.89%	10,803	44.52%	QS	PCQ	45.98%	1,801	14,532	2,483	816	3,729	–	–	903	24,264

= open seat
= turnout is above provincial average
= winning candidate was in previous Legislature
= incumbent had switched allegiance
= previously incumbent in another riding
= not incumbent; was previously elected to the Legislature
= incumbency arose from byelection gain
= other incumbents renominated
= previously an MP in the House of Commons of Canada
= multiple candidates

==== MNAs elected ====
- Abitibi-Est: Stéphane Tremblay
- Abitibi-Ouest: Sébastien D'Astous
- Acadie: André Morin
- Anjou–Louis-Riel: Nicolas Plourde
- Argenteuil: Pierre Nantel
- Arthabaska-L'Érable: Tarek Henoud
- Beauce-Nord: Patricia Drouin
- Beauce-Sud: Jonathan Poulin
- Beauharnois: Alexandre Daneau
- Bellechasse: Éric Duhaime
- Bellefeuille: Audrey Bujold
- Berthier: Elsie Lefebvre
- Bertrand: Alexandre Girard-Duchaine
- Blainville: Nadine Le Gal
- Bonaventure: Pier-Luc Bujold
- Borduas: Cédric Gagnon-Ducharme
- Bourassa-Sauvé: Madwa-Nika Cadet
- Brome-Missisquoi: Frédéric Beauchemin
- Camille-Laurin: Paul St-Pierre Plamondon
- Chambly: Julie Guyot
- Champlain: Adriana Szalontai
- Chapleau: Michel Langevin
- Charlesbourg: Éloïse Coulombe
- Charlevoix–Côte-de-Beaupré: Caroline Simard
- Châteauguay: Félix Rhéaume
- Chauveau: Karim Elayoubi
- Chicoutimi: Marie-Karlynn Laflamme
- Chomedey: Madeleine Féquière
- Chutes-de-la-Chaudière: Dominique Dumas
- Côte-du-Sud: Frédéric Poulin
- Daniel-Johnson: Nathalie Boisclair
- D'Arcy-McGee: Elisabeth Prass
- Deux-Montagnes: Linda Vaillant
- Drummond–Bois-Francs: Charles Page
- Dubuc: Émile Simard
- Duplessis: Meggie Richard
- Fabre: Marie Claude Fournier
- Gaspé: Méganne Perry Mélançon
- Gatineau: David Logue
- Gouin: Alexandre Boulerice
- Granby: Jean-François Arsenault
- Groulx: Marie-Claude Sarrazin
- Hochelaga-Maisonneuve: Alexandre Leduc
- Hull: Sacha Cannon
- Huntingdon: Frédéric Laplante
- Iberville: Camille Pellerin-Forget
- Îles-de-la-Madeleine: Joël Arseneau
- Jacques-Cartier: Greg Kelley
- Jean-Lesage: Sol Zanetti
- Jeanne-Mance–Viger: Filomena Rotiroti
- Jean-Talon: Julie White
- Joliette: Véronique Venne
- Jonquière: Jimmy Bouchard
- La Peltrie: Maïté Blanchette Vézina
- La Pinière: Linda Caron
- La Prairie: Sonia Ziadé
- Labelle: Catherine Drouin
- Lac-Saint-Jean: William Fradette
- LaFontaine: Marc Tanguay
- L'Assomption: Maxime Laporte
- Laurier-Dorion: Andrés Fontecilla
- Laval-des-Rapides: Caroline De Guire
- Laviolette–Saint-Maurice: Élodie Murphy-Gauthier
- Les Plaines: Dieudonné Ella Oyono
- Lévis: Karine Laflamme
- Lotbinière-Frontenac: Renaud Labrecque
- Louis-Hébert: Marcos Archambault
- Marguerite-Bourgeoys: Michel Leblanc
- Marie-Lacoste-Gérin-Lajoie: Natalie Bisaillon
- Marie-Victorin: Nicolas Marceau
- Marquette: Enrico Ciccone
- Maskinongé: Isabelle Blais
- Masson: Stéphane Handfield
- Matane-Matapédia-Mitis: Pascal Bérubé
- Maurice-Richard: Nada Boumeftah
- Mégantic: Jimmy Gagnon
- Mercier: Ruba Ghazal
- Mille-Îles: Virginie Dufour
- Mirabel: Geneviève Couture
- Montarville: Mathieu Lavoie
- Montmorency: Marie-Josée Hélie
- Mont-Royal–Outremont: Michelle Setlakwe
- Nelligan: Monsef Derraji
- Nicolet-Bécancour: Guillaume Langlois
- Notre-Dame-de-Grâce: Désirée McGraw
- Orford: Charles Milliard
- Papineau: Isabelle Millette
- Pierre-Laporte: David Bowles
- Pointe-aux-Trembles: Stéphane Paquet
- Pontiac: André Fortin
- Portneuf: Marcel Bouchard
- Prévost: Anne Nguyen
- René-Lévesque: Odette Lavigne
- Repentigny: Nicolas Girard
- Richelieu: Jocelyn Desjardins
- Richmond: Bernard Sévigny
- Rimouski: Yohann St-Pierre
- Rivière-du-Loup–Témiscouata–Les Basques: Ariane Boyer
- Robert-Baldwin: Brigitte Garceau
- Roberval: Isabelle Thibeault
- Rosemont: Gisèle Pouhe Njall
- Rousseau: Mathieu Lebrun
- Rouyn-Noranda–Témiscamingue: Diane Dallaire
- Sainte-Marie–Saint-Jacques: Roxane Milot
- Sainte-Rose: Cécile Tremblay
- Saint-François: Sylvie Tanguay
- Saint-Henri–Sainte-Anne: Benoit Clermont
- Saint-Hyacinthe: Simon-Pierre Savard-Tremblay
- Saint-Jean: Gaétan Bédard
- Saint-Jérôme: Sandrine Michon
- Saint-Laurent: Valérie Assouline
- Sanguinet: Alain Therrien
- Sherbrooke: Stéphanie Vachon
- Soulanges: Olivier Bertin-Mahieux
- Taillon: Sandra Hernández
- Taschereau: Étienne Grandmont
- Terrebonne: Catherine Gentilcore
- Trois-Rivières: Jean Pellerin
- Ungava: Sonia Caron
- Vachon: Stephan Fogaing
- Vanier-Les Rivières: Patrick Paquet
- Vaudreuil: James Hughes
- Verchères: Guy Lapointe
- Verdun: Antoine Dionne-Charest
- Viau: Frantz Benjamin
- Vimont-Auteuil: Louis Ialenti
- Westmount–Saint-Louis: Jennifer Maccarone

=== Comparative analysis for ridings (2026 vs 2022) ===
==== Analytical charts ====
Ternary plots of election results
2022

2026
Electoral districts won identified by CAQ (blue), PCQ (dark blue), Liberal (red), Québec solidaire (orange) and PQ (cyan).

==== Turnout, winning shares and swings ====
Summary of riding results by turnout, vote share for winning candidate and by swing
Riding and winning party			Turnout		Vote share (Note: Share won by winning candidate, with difference noted from share achieved by the same party in 2022.)		Swing (Note: Positive indicates improvement to standing of party winning in 2022; negative points to 2022's second-place party being swung to.)		
Riding and winning party			%	Change (pp)	%	Change (pp)	From	To	Change (pp)
Abitibi-Est	PQ	Gain	63.29	0.72	34.65	22.26	CAQ	PLQ	-20.34
Abitibi-Ouest	PQ	Gain	64.30	0.60	49.59	28.83	CAQ	PQ	-30.11
Acadie	PLQ	Hold	53.14	-0.31	49.46	7.20	QS	PLQ	2.39
Anjou-Louis-Riel	PLQ	Gain	62.68	-1.17	40.05	9.53	CAQ	PLQ	-15.56
Argenteuil	PQ	Gain	63.75	-0.42	33.13	16.92	CAQ	PQ	-25.29
Arthabaska-L'Érable	PCQ	Gain	74.39	0.29	40.55	15.86	CAQ	PCQ	-27.16
Beauce-Nord	PCQ	Gain	77.56	0.53	61.86	19.03	CAQ	PCQ	-27.77
Beauce-Sud	PCQ	Gain	75.03	-0.90	58.19	14.79	CAQ	PCQ	-18.46
Beauharnois	PQ	Gain	67.89	1.56	44.87	27.91	CAQ	PQ	-31.24
Bellechasse	PCQ	Gain	77.29	3.43	63.84	28.58	CAQ	PCQ	-32.49
Bellefeuille	PQ	New	70.06	New	48.59	New			
Berthier	PQ	Gain	67.91	0.06	43.45	22.63	CAQ	PQ	-29.20
Bertrand	PQ	Gain	66.75	1.98	39.88	19.25	CAQ	PQ	-22.95
Blainville	PQ	Gain	72.36	0.24	33.69	18.26	CAQ	PQ	-26.65
Bonaventure	PQ	Gain	60.08	-2.68	46.54	16.48	CAQ	PQ	-19.66
Borduas	PQ	Gain	77.83	2.89	35.30	15.84	CAQ	PQ	-21.75
Bourassa-Sauvé	PLQ	Hold	50.98	-2.48	47.39	7.26	CAQ	PLQ	11.45
Brome-Missisquoi	PLQ	Gain	70.43	2.44	32.47	20.56	CAQ	QS	-12.90
Camille-Laurin	PQ	Hold	63.37	-0.08	39.66	-2.02	CAQ	PQ	10.60
Chambly	PQ	Gain	75.33	1.60	34.28	16.38	CAQ	PQ	-22.99
Champlain	PCQ	Gain	72.40	1.42	29.27	11.72	CAQ	PCQ	-25.28
Chapleau	PLQ	Gain	58.57	-0.21	37.46	23.85	CAQ	PLQ	-29.82
Charlesbourg	PCQ	Gain	76.91	2.31	38.49	18.12	CAQ	PCQ	-25.67
Charlevoix-Côte-de-Beaupré	PCQ	Gain	74.04	3.84	38.99	20.87	CAQ	PCQ	-25.64
Châteauguay	PLQ	Gain	61.46	-0.52	35.76	10.98	CAQ	PLQ	-18.30
Chauveau	PCQ	Gain	77.52	1.84	47.88	16.04	CAQ	PCQ	-26.56
Chicoutimi	PQ	Gain	66.46	-2.27	39.39	25.18	CAQ	PQ	-35.50
Chomedey	PLQ	Hold	50.50	-4.02	45.17	8.65	CAQ	PLQ	13.23
Chutes-de-la-Chaudière	PCQ	Gain	80.99	2.08	45.74	18.54	CAQ	PCQ	-27.27
Côte-du-Sud	PCQ	Gain	71.73	3.27	42.34	18.93	CAQ	PCQ	-24.83
D'Arcy-McGee	PLQ	Hold	48.1	0.61	60.74	9.33	PCQ	PLQ	5.79
Daniel-Johnson	PQ	Gain	71.15	3.51	34.70	20.29	CAQ	PCQ	-23.63
Deux-Montagnes	PQ	Gain	69.60	0.12	36.42	19.26	CAQ	PQ	-25.98
Drummond-Bois-Francs	PQ	Gain	70.75	1.15	30.67	15.62	CAQ	PCQ	-22.11
Dubuc	PQ	Gain	65.27	0.22	38.63	21.08	CAQ	PQ	-32.16
Duplessis	PQ	Gain	54.54	1.33	47.14	22.35	CAQ	PQ	-22.38
Fabre	PLQ	Gain	60.73	-1.82	42.74	11.83	CAQ	PLQ	-17.39
Gaspé	PQ	Gain	60.21	-0.75	58.81	21.31	CAQ	PQ	-24.61
Gatineau	PLQ	Gain	60.84	2.05	41.67	22.11	CAQ	PLQ	-29.08
Gouin	QS	Hold	72.62	3.05	62.61	3.17	PQ	QS	0.32
Granby	PQ	Gain	68.90	0.76	32.95	21.11	CAQ	QS	-16.19
Groulx	PQ	Gain	68.41	-0.10	32.17	16.86	CAQ	QS	-12.45
Hochelaga-Maisonneuve	QS	Hold	66.77	4.21	52.01	1.17	CAQ	QS	7.81
Hull	PLQ	Gain	56.96	-0.98	42.50	16.58	CAQ	PLQ	-19.68
Huntingdon	PQ	Gain	67.04	2.77	30.48	18.46	CAQ	PLQ	-22.88
Iberville	PQ	Gain	71.14	0.91	35.51	20.27	CAQ	PQ	-27.30
Îles-de-la-Madeleine	PQ	Hold	69.32	-6.42	66.54	20.19	CAQ	PQ	27.88
Jacques-Cartier	PLQ	Hold	63.60	0.43	73.21	10.64	PCQ	PLQ	5.54
Jean-Lesage	QS	Hold	69.11	1.77	35.67	-2.10	CAQ	QS	9.90
Jean-Talon	PLQ	Gain	76.55	2.69	31.76	18.25	CAQ	QS	-7.34
Jeanne-Mance-Viger	PLQ	Hold	55.32	0.31	64.06	10.13	CAQ	PLQ	11.15
Joliette	PQ	Gain	69.99	0.23	45.04	13.81	CAQ	PQ	-20.84
Jonquière	PQ	Gain	68.32	-0.14	36.34	17.04	CAQ	PQ	-21.55
L'Assomption	PQ	Gain	70.82	0.07	41.09	27.34	CAQ	QS	-18.46
La Peltrie	PCQ	Gain	76.61	2.91	48.17	18.27	CAQ	PCQ	-26.73
La Pinière	PLQ	Hold	59.15	-0.75	50.05	11.54	CAQ	PLQ	16.47
La Prairie	PLQ	Gain	73.02	0.52	31.01	17.16	CAQ	PLQ	-26.64
Labelle	PQ	Gain	65.90	0.75	39.85	20.72	CAQ	PQ	-27.42
Lac-Saint-Jean	PQ	Gain	68.05	0.87	45.61	19.99	CAQ	PQ	-28.15
LaFontaine	PLQ	Hold	60.41	-1.92	58.86	7.19	CAQ	PLQ	10.61
Laurier-Dorion	QS	Hold	65.48	3.86	50.66	1.86	QS	PLQ	-3.25
Laval-des-Rapides	PLQ	Gain	59.30	-2.18	36.38	7.65	CAQ	PLQ	-13.92
Laviolette-Saint-Maurice	PQ	Gain	64.82	0.78	31.35	15.34	CAQ	PCQ	-23.37
Les Plaines	PQ	Gain	68.22	0.63	38.98	22.85	CAQ	PQ	-30.40
Lévis	PCQ	Gain	74.86	1.13	38.53	17.78	CAQ	PCQ	-24.72
Lotbinière-Frontenac	PCQ	Gain	74.99	1.13	54.39	22.19	CAQ	PCQ	-28.25
Louis-Hébert	PCQ	Gain	83.31	2.22	29.07	14.46	CAQ	PQ	-22.14
Marguerite-Bourgeoys	PLQ	Hold	52.92	-1.79	52.62	7.84	CAQ	PLQ	12.02
Marie-Lacoste-Gérin-Lajoie	PQ	New	68.75	New	36.13	New			
Marie-Victorin	PQ	Gain	63.01	1.37	33.34	8.49	CAQ	PQ	-14.06
Marquette	PLQ	Hold	58.26	-0.06	55.29	8.56	CAQ	PLQ	11.83
Maskinongé	PQ	Gain	72.85	2.28	31.96	17.82	CAQ	PCQ	-22.41
Masson	PQ	Gain	71.34	0.18	40.27	22.03	CAQ	PQ	-29.03
Matane-Matapédia-Mitis	PQ	Hold	63.48	-1.45	67.77	0.34	CAQ	PQ	5.55
Maurice-Richard	PLQ	Gain	69.32	0.96	31.07	13.85	CAQ	QS	7.24
Mégantic	PCQ	Gain	69.99	-0.40	34.29	12.04	CAQ	PCQ	-19.09
Mercier	QS	Hold	66.46	2.84	59.2	5.28	PQ	QS	3.65
Mille-Îles	PLQ	Hold	66.33	-0.65	44.32	11.94	CAQ	PLQ	16.69
Mirabel	PQ	Gain	71.32	2.34	39.81	23.03	CAQ	PQ	-29.38
Mont-Royal-Outremont	PLQ	Hold	54.34	0.64	50.94	11.59	QS	PLQ	5.57
Montarville	PLQ	Gain	80.74	2.19	29.62	17.35	CAQ	PQ	-18.06
Montmorency	PCQ	Gain	77.22	3.28	43.81	17.75	CAQ	PCQ	-25.07
Nelligan	PLQ	Hold	58.97	0.21	63.7	11.67	CAQ	PLQ	11.72
Nicolet-Bécancour	PCQ	Gain	75.20	2.68	41.21	18.98	CAQ	PCQ	-24.84
Notre-Dame-de-Grâce	PLQ	Hold	57.09	1.33	61.04	10.58	QS	PLQ	4.15
Orford	PLQ	Gain	72.95	1.76	37.80	22.81	CAQ	QS	-12.29
Papineau	PQ	Gain	61.65	2.21	30.17	19.94	CAQ	QS	-17.45
Pierre-Laporte	PLQ	Gain	64.53	0.49	42.89	14.07	CAQ	PLQ	-17.76
Pointe-aux-Trembles	PQ	Gain	65.60	-0.73	38.08	18.21	CAQ	PQ	-22.72
Pontiac	PLQ	Hold	53.51	0.01	61.36	17.68	CAQ	PLQ	18.37
Portneuf	PCQ	Gain	76.00	2.71	51.58	21.84	CAQ	PCQ	-25.69
Prévost	PQ	Gain	71.70	2.33	38.61	19.03	CAQ	PQ	-23.90
René-Lévesque	PQ	Gain	58.91	-1.02	50.72	29.55	CAQ	PQ	-35.58
Repentigny	PQ	Gain	72.11	-1.13	36.21	18.48	CAQ	PQ	-24.57
Richelieu	PQ	Gain	68.78	0.97	41.26	20.98	CAQ	PQ	-27.69
Richmond	PQ	Gain	74.27	2.17	29.23	16.47	CAQ	QS	-12.10
Rimouski	PQ	Gain	71.15	-0.45	43.35	14.71	CAQ	PQ	-19.38
Rivière-du-Loup-Témiscouata-Les Basques	PQ	Gain	70.23	1.34	35.29	17.71	CAQ	PQ	-25.04
Robert-Baldwin	PLQ	Hold	56.27	0.47	65.05	7.29	PCQ	PLQ	4.08
Roberval	PQ	Gain	63.39	2.61	36.53	16.00	CAQ	PQ	-26.75
Rosemont	QS	Hold	70.19	1.97	39.22	1.60	CAQ	QS	8.92
Rousseau	PQ	Gain	64.06	2.57	44.07	26.21	CAQ	PQ	-32.04
Rouyn-Noranda-Témiscamingue	PQ	Gain	63.87	-1.04	36.62	25.37	CAQ	QS	-4.82
Saint-François	PQ	Gain	68.67	-0.78	26.03	16.92	CAQ	QS	-6.04
Saint-Henri-Sainte-Anne	PLQ	Hold	60.13	2.31	37.20	1.05	PLQ	QS	-3.83
Saint-Hyacinthe	PQ	Gain	71.87	1.40	39.07	22.37	CAQ	PQ	-29.70
Saint-Jean	PQ	Gain	69.81	0.08	35.62	16.40	CAQ	PQ	-25.08
Saint-Jérôme	PQ	Gain	63.06	-2.11	39.50	20.67	CAQ	PQ	-27.10
Saint-Laurent	PLQ	Hold	52.01	1.05	54.45	4.48	CAQ	PLQ	7.06
Sainte-Marie-Saint-Jacques	QS	Hold	59.45	3.22	43.15	-4.54	QS	PLQ	-7.05
Sainte-Rose	PLQ	Gain	65.55	-2.01	37.48	13.50	CAQ	PLQ	-19.59
Sanguinet	PQ	Gain	71.50	1.69	41.59	25.29	CAQ	PQ	-29.88
Sherbrooke	QS	Hold	70.17	-0.65	27.22	-14.69	CAQ	QS	4.85
Soulanges	PLQ	Gain	68.61	1.24	35.51	13.69	CAQ	PLQ	-21.23
Taillon	PQ	Gain	68.40	0.74	32.11	11.80	CAQ	PQ	-18.92
Taschereau	QS	Hold	74.44	2.16	41.77	2.24	QS	PQ	-0.22
Terrebonne	PQ	Gain	71.21	0.02	39.51	20.63	CAQ	PQ	-27.58
Trois-Rivières	PQ	Gain	69.75	1.03	27.10	12.76	CAQ	QS	-9.96
Ungava	PQ	Gain	27.61	-2.60	39.23	26.68	CAQ	QS	-3.55
Vachon	PQ	Gain	68.43	0.06	27.51	14.14	CAQ	PLQ	-17.73
Vanier-Les Rivières	PCQ	Gain	75.65	2.11	36.97	17.45	CAQ	PCQ	-26.01
Vaudreuil	PLQ	Hold	65.05	-0.14	46.75	12.53	CAQ	PLQ	17.35
Verchères	PQ	Gain	77.23	1.95	39.90	19.19	CAQ	PQ	-26.33
Verdun	PLQ	Gain	66.19	1.67	37.77	8.50	QS	PLQ	-1.83
Viau	PLQ	Hold	52.92	-1.11	42.45	4.27	QS	PLQ	3.06
Vimont-Auteuil	PLQ	Gain	68.28	-1.69	42.76	12.91	CAQ	PLQ	-17.28
Westmount-Saint-Louis	PLQ	Hold	45.98	0.99	59.89	9.41	QS	PLQ	3.43

==== Changes in party shares ====
Share change analysis by party and riding (2026 vs 2022)
Riding	PQ		PLQ		PCQ		CAQ		QS	
Riding	%	Change (pp)	%	Change (pp)	%	Change (pp)	%	Change (pp)	%	Change (pp)
Abitibi-Est	34.65	22.26	20.68	5.97	22.20	10.19	12.46	-34.71	9.42	-4.29
Abitibi-Ouest	49.59	28.83	8.18	3.00	18.10	7.79	15.36	-31.39	8.77	-7.52
Acadie	13.11	3.24	49.46	7.20	9.27	-2.10	5.48	-11.63	19.63	2.43
Anjou-Louis-Riel	20.84	9.80	40.05	9.53	9.40	2.24	13.97	-21.59	14.60	-0.17
Argenteuil	33.13	16.92	25.61	15.43	20.12	5.40	11.45	-33.65	6.96	-3.83
Arthabaska-L'Érable	32.73	22.71	7.55	3.79	40.55	15.86	13.30	-38.45	5.04	-4.18
Beauce-Nord	12.17	6.23	15.18	12.35	61.86	19.03	6.93	-36.50	3.37	-1.16
Beauce-Sud	9.00	4.96	7.79	4.96	58.19	14.79	22.43	-22.12	2.37	-1.98
Beauharnois	44.87	27.91	12.58	6.75	15.61	6.25	19.22	-34.56	6.35	-6.58
Bellechasse	15.04	6.21	7.43	3.30	63.84	28.58	9.35	-36.39	4.10	-1.94
Bellefeuille	41.59	New	14.46	New	23.51	New	12.30	New	8.14	New
Berthier	43.45	22.63	8.84	6.29	21.72	10.73	15.21	-35.76	9.04	-5.05
Bertrand	39.88	19.25	14.17	8.16	14.53	4.74	18.62	-26.64	11.51	-4.64
Blainville	33.69	18.26	26.55	15.52	15.97	6.21	14.42	-35.03	7.74	-6.26
Bonaventure	46.54	16.48	13.77	5.21	9.53	4.07	21.62	-22.83	8.53	-2.30
Borduas	35.30	15.84	15.69	10.45	14.01	6.45	23.57	-27.66	10.60	-4.54
Bourassa-Sauvé	16.34	7.65	47.39	7.26	9.43	0.49	9.38	-15.63	16.90	1.45
Brome-Missisquoi	27.19	15.24	32.47	20.56	16.09	5.22	13.11	-32.76	8.95	-6.96
Camille-Laurin	39.66	-2.02	22.07	5.60	7.69	1.18	8.72	-23.22	20.26	N/A (Note: Not contested in 2022.)
Chambly	34.28	16.38	19.24	11.39	14.56	6.23	18.87	-29.60	11.13	-5.24
Champlain	28.84	16.80	15.02	9.94	29.27	11.72	17.06	-38.83	6.70	-2.27
Chapleau	19.70	10.00	37.46	23.85	15.99	5.89	16.52	-35.78	8.51	-4.69
Charlesbourg	25.85	11.66	13.58	7.59	38.49	18.12	11.79	-33.21	9.38	-3.67
Charlevoix-Côte-de-Beaupré	25.60	9.41	7.95	3.25	38.99	20.87	17.76	-30.41	9.21	-3.32
Châteauguay	27.96	16.12	35.76	10.98	12.32	2.23	13.51	-25.61	8.80	-3.98
Chauveau	20.59	12.96	12.66	8.85	47.88	16.04	9.77	-37.07	8.39	-0.42
Chicoutimi	39.39	25.18	14.64	11.60	18.34	9.91	16.46	-45.82	9.85	-2.19
Chomedey	13.26	6.07	45.17	8.65	18.04	-1.81	8.89	-17.81	10.29	2.40
Chutes-de-la-Chaudière	22.94	11.83	13.15	8.20	45.74	18.54	11.46	-36.00	5.41	-3.87
Côte-du-Sud	23.91	11.14	11.08	4.77	42.34	18.93	16.97	-30.72	5.70	-3.63
D'Arcy-McGee	3.90	1.39	60.74	9.33	19.71	-2.24	2.56	-3.35	9.98	1.46
Daniel-Johnson	34.70	20.29	16.75	13.24	24.87	9.74	14.98	-37.52	8.69	-5.11
Deux-Montagnes	36.42	19.26	22.35	12.08	15.04	5.22	14.38	-32.70	11.11	-3.04
Drummond-Bois-Francs	30.67	15.62	12.14	8.13	29.41	12.02	19.44	-32.20	6.95	-3.70
Dubuc	38.63	21.08	11.35	8.86	28.43	17.39	14.36	-43.24	6.50	-4.08
Duplessis	47.14	22.35	5.40	1.38	19.53	3.81	22.74	-22.40	4.92	-4.44
Fabre	19.80	10.05	42.74	11.83	17.27	2.10	8.86	-22.95	9.77	-1.36
Gaspé	58.81	21.31	12.73	5.84	7.59	2.34	13.49	-27.91	7.39	-1.58
Gatineau	22.27	12.56	41.67	22.11	16.89	6.13	10.69	-36.05	7.78	-4.32
Gouin	16.15	2.52	12.81	4.41	3.43	0.32	3.07	-9.30	62.61	3.17
Granby	32.95	21.11	18.89	14.13	17.44	7.33	20.65	-37.54	9.12	-5.17
Groulx	32.17	16.86	23.62	12.60	14.48	5.78	17.74	-30.01	11.10	-5.11
Hochelaga-Maisonneuve	24.70	8.73	12.27	4.49	4.60	-0.02	4.36	-14.44	52.01	1.17
Hull	16.90	7.12	42.50	16.58	10.61	3.75	11.87	-22.77	17.58	-3.17
Huntingdon	30.48	18.46	25.64	11.25	25.55	12.16	12.13	-34.51	5.60	-5.55
Iberville	35.51	20.27	12.89	7.25	22.13	10.86	18.82	-34.33	8.59	-5.13
Îles-de-la-Madeleine	66.54	20.19	20.51	13.26	2.66	1.55	4.34	-35.57	4.44	-0.94
Jacques-Cartier	4.33	1.31	73.21	10.64	10.79	-0.44	2.87	-6.55	5.53	0.51
Jean-Lesage	21.09	10.02	9.06	4.66	23.65	9.53	9.36	-21.90	35.67	-2.10
Jean-Talon	29.26	10.57	31.76	18.25	15.66	5.30	8.18	-24.32	14.11	-9.65
Jeanne-Mance-Viger	8.36	4.18	64.06	10.13	9.68	-1.92	4.44	-12.16	12.20	1.55
Joliette	45.04	13.81	9.26	6.26	17.50	8.68	17.72	-27.86	8.68	-2.70
Jonquière	36.34	17.04	5.36	3.24	17.16	7.61	33.34	-26.05	7.28	-1.79
L'Assomption	41.09	27.34	13.52	7.84	18.27	10.64	16.85	-41.78	9.45	-4.87
La Peltrie	18.85	8.92	15.70	10.04	48.17	18.27	9.17	-35.18	7.11	-1.79
La Pinière	14.42	6.60	50.05	11.54	12.29	2.14	9.78	-21.39	11.17	1.15
La Prairie	29.24	17.82	31.01	17.16	13.61	5.66	16.60	-36.11	8.84	-4.26
Labelle	39.85	20.72	12.30	7.25	18.97	9.43	18.97	-34.11	8.13	-4.13
Lac-Saint-Jean	45.61	19.99	9.06	6.04	22.30	10.93	15.17	-36.30	6.81	-0.77
LaFontaine	10.49	5.39	58.86	7.19	13.51	0.37	5.98	-14.03	9.67	0.80
Laurier-Dorion	12.14	1.88	27.92	8.35	4.45	-1.09	2.45	-9.28	50.66	1.86
Laval-des-Rapides	22.69	9.77	36.38	7.65	11.76	3.18	11.72	-20.18	16.14	-0.54
Laviolette-Saint-Maurice	31.35	15.34	17.09	12.10	27.40	10.65	15.64	-36.08	6.83	-2.67
Les Plaines	38.98	22.85	16.41	9.53	21.08	8.98	12.60	-37.94	8.69	-4.63
Lévis	22.24	9.33	13.48	8.35	38.53	17.78	17.13	-31.66	7.88	-3.59
Lotbinière-Frontenac	18.42	9.62	12.81	6.89	54.39	22.19	9.42	-34.30	4.14	-5.22
Louis-Hébert	26.64	10.12	22.73	14.02	29.07	14.46	13.05	-34.16	7.95	-4.08
Marguerite-Bourgeoys	15.25	8.28	52.62	7.84	11.69	0.69	6.95	-16.20	12.19	1.92
Marie-Lacoste-Gérin-Lajoie	36.13	New	14.72	New	27.29	New	13.74	New	6.89	New
Marie-Victorin	33.34	8.49	20.29	10.25	10.26	3.24	13.48	-19.63	20.94	-1.73
Marquette	14.67	6.61	55.29	8.56	10.31	1.18	6.72	-15.10	10.59	-0.68
Maskinongé	31.96	17.82	13.26	8.19	27.04	10.98	19.67	-33.83	6.81	-3.09
Masson	40.27	22.03	18.41	10.69	17.27	8.84	15.57	-36.03	8.47	-4.60
Matane-Matapédia-Mitis	67.77	0.34	6.76	4.62	13.32	5.53	6.60	-10.76	4.61	-0.26
Maurice-Richard	24.69	10.02	31.07	13.85	5.42	1.22	8.11	-19.05	30.09	-4.58
Mégantic	24.98	12.21	12.12	6.41	34.29	12.04	20.04	-26.13	7.06	-5.72
Mercier	12.55	-2.02	19.44	5.42	3.34	-0.50	3.25	-7.03	59.20	5.28
Mille-Îles	21.69	9.62	44.32	11.94	12.64	2.08	9.50	-21.43	11.51	-1.37
Mirabel	39.81	23.03	16.03	9.27	21.10	9.67	14.39	-35.72	7.75	-6.66
Mont-Royal-Outremont	11.73	0.31	50.94	11.59	9.07	0.56	5.31	-10.48	20.74	0.46
Montarville	28.84	10.15	29.62	17.35	8.53	3.41	19.93	-25.97	11.70	-4.55
Montmorency	22.38	11.10	11.57	6.92	43.81	17.75	12.79	-32.39	8.67	-3.38
Nelligan	7.53	3.36	63.70	11.67	14.31	-0.78	4.88	-11.77	6.76	1.50
Nicolet-Bécancour	28.80	11.62	7.99	3.25	41.21	18.98	16.35	-30.70	4.47	-4.33
Notre-Dame-de-Grâce	5.92	0.83	61.04	10.58	7.93	-0.22	2.86	-4.47	17.77	2.28
Orford	25.04	11.43	37.80	22.81	13.83	2.95	11.89	-31.06	9.68	-6.48
Papineau	30.17	19.94	28.67	20.26	21.97	8.70	11.24	-41.59	7.08	-6.70
Pierre-Laporte	21.74	9.55	42.89	14.07	9.18	1.79	9.32	-21.44	14.76	-2.96
Pointe-aux-Trembles	38.08	18.21	17.67	7.29	11.64	4.83	18.66	-27.22	12.71	-2.70
Pontiac	10.82	4.21	61.36	17.68	11.27	0.35	5.64	-19.06	9.57	-0.71
Portneuf	15.51	5.66	7.57	4.75	51.58	21.84	17.84	-29.54	6.53	-1.69
Prévost	38.61	19.03	15.76	9.74	19.54	7.86	17.47	-28.76	8.18	-6.92
René-Lévesque	50.72	29.55	4.84	3.25	13.69	3.57	17.31	-41.61	7.35	-0.21
Repentigny	36.21	18.48	18.73	8.77	12.79	6.38	21.70	-30.66	9.75	-2.93
Richelieu	41.26	20.98	10.72	6.59	18.35	9.53	21.49	-34.40	6.79	-3.29
Richmond	29.23	16.47	22.77	17.32	22.88	8.18	13.26	-33.49	10.57	-9.29
Rimouski	43.35	14.71	9.46	6.45	13.21	8.46	17.71	-24.04	15.04	-6.33
Rivière-du-Loup-Témiscouata-Les Basques	35.29	17.71	14.37	10.40	23.00	11.73	19.69	-32.37	6.74	-7.87
Robert-Baldwin	4.90	2.30	65.05	7.29	15.15	-0.87	3.37	-6.38	8.80	3.78
Roberval	36.53	16.00	13.42	8.87	26.07	14.70	18.69	-37.50	5.29	-1.54
Rosemont	27.92	6.65	19.87	8.08	5.18	0.64	6.83	-16.23	39.22	1.60
Rousseau	44.07	26.21	8.12	4.67	27.95	12.97	12.71	-37.87	7.15	-5.99
Rouyn-Noranda-Témiscamingue	36.62	25.37	11.35	6.98	18.29	10.63	18.71	-26.45	14.12	-16.82
Saint-François	26.03	16.92	23.86	15.95	17.73	6.72	16.67	-25.76	14.52	-13.69
Saint-Henri-Sainte-Anne	13.22	4.95	37.20	1.05	7.34	0.98	4.36	-13.37	36.43	8.71
Saint-Hyacinthe	39.07	22.37	15.95	11.82	17.78	7.94	17.39	-37.03	8.83	-4.81
Saint-Jean	35.62	16.40	18.70	12.72	16.44	8.04	16.90	-33.75	10.43	-4.33
Saint-Jérôme	39.50	20.67	13.12	8.59	18.13	8.39	16.49	-33.53	11.71	-3.91
Saint-Laurent	8.39	2.47	54.45	4.48	12.34	-1.54	4.65	-9.64	16.54	6.62
Sainte-Marie-Saint-Jacques	19.97	5.25	25.40	9.55	4.48	-0.50	4.20	-10.11	43.15	-4.54
Sainte-Rose	23.83	11.44	37.48	13.50	13.29	3.92	12.83	-25.67	11.59	-2.74
Sanguinet	41.59	25.29	19.06	9.20	15.62	5.05	14.32	-34.46	8.98	-4.13
Sherbrooke	24.05	14.96	25.78	19.94	10.32	3.58	10.86	-24.39	27.22	-14.69
Soulanges	25.36	15.09	35.51	13.69	17.70	5.23	13.85	-28.77	6.03	-4.81
Taillon	32.11	11.80	26.31	14.69	10.20	3.73	15.48	-26.03	14.98	-3.92
Taschereau	25.25	2.68	14.02	8.13	11.51	2.75	6.61	-15.32	41.77	2.24
Terrebonne	39.51	20.63	19.85	9.68	15.51	7.57	14.91	-34.53	9.44	-3.21
Trois-Rivières	27.10	12.76	16.68	11.14	18.08	5.82	25.76	-25.05	11.21	-5.14
Ungava	39.23	26.68	27.68	9.49	17.35	8.59	10.35	-25.92	5.40	-18.83
Vachon	27.51	14.14	27.50	11.43	12.96	4.06	20.88	-24.03	10.43	-4.58
Vanier-Les Rivières	23.86	10.79	16.85	10.57	36.97	17.45	12.83	-34.56	8.36	-3.79
Vaudreuil	19.86	12.16	46.75	12.53	14.22	2.60	10.61	-22.16	7.29	-1.94
Verchères	39.90	19.19	15.21	9.93	14.71	7.63	17.82	-33.46	11.62	-2.82
Verdun	13.82	5.49	37.77	8.50	5.96	0.61	5.13	-17.87	35.60	4.85
Viau	14.13	6.55	42.45	4.27	7.06	0.92	4.77	-10.41	28.60	-1.84
Vimont-Auteuil	20.92	10.35	42.76	12.91	12.64	-0.24	12.63	-21.65	9.75	-1.73
Westmount-Saint-Louis	7.42	1.37	59.89	9.41	10.23	1.02	3.36	-6.72	15.37	2.55

=== Proportionality ===
Gallagher Index for the 2026 Quebec general election
Party	Votes (%)	Seats (%)	Difference	Difference squared
PQ	28.02%	46.46%	18.44	340.0336
PLQ	24.23%	31.50%	7.27	52.8529
PCQ	20.66%	14.96%	-5.7	32.49
QS	12.42%	7.09%	-5.33	28.4089
CAQ	13.35%	0.00%	-13.35	178.2225
Others	1.32%	0.00%	-1.32	1.7424
Total of differences squared				633.7503
Total / 2				316.8751
Square root of (Total / 2): Gallagher Index result				17.8
^{The Gallagher Index ranges from 0 to 100. Low indexes (close to 0) are very proportionate, high indexes (20 or greater) are very disproportionate.}

=== Detailed analysis ===
Party candidates in 2nd place
Party in 1st place	Party in 2nd place					Total
Party in 1st place	PQ	PLQ	PCQ	CAQ	QS	Total
Parti Québécois	–	17	25	17	1	60
Liberal	20	–	7	–	12	39
Conservative	16	1	–	2	–	19
Québec solidaire	4	4	1	–	–	9
Total	40	22	33	19	13	127

Principal races, according to 1st and 2nd-place results
Parties		Seats
█ Parti Québécois	█ Conservative	41
█ Parti Québécois	█ Liberal	37
█ Parti Québécois	█ Coalition Avenir Québec	17
█ Parti Québécois	█ Québec solidaire	5
█ Liberal	█ Québec solidaire	16
█ Liberal	█ Conservative	8
█ Conservative	█ Coalition Avenir Québec	2
█ Québec solidaire	█ Conservative	1
Total		127

Party rankings (1st to 5th place)
Party	1st	2nd	3rd	4th	5th
Parti Québécois	60	40	20	7	–
Liberal	39	22	28	30	7
Conservative	19	33	34	29	12
Québec solidaire	9	13	11	17	77
Coalition Avenir Québec	–	19	34	44	30
Démocratie directe	–	–	–	–	1

== Reactions ==
=== National reactions ===
In a phone call, Prime Minister Mark Carney congratulated St-Pierre Plamondon for his victory and pledged to work with him in a mutual benefit partnership between Quebec and the federal government. Figures of the Alberta separatist movement congratulated the Parti Québécois for its victory as well.

=== International reactions ===
Two days after the election, businessman Elon Musk reacted to the election of a minority Parti Québécois government by declaring his support for the Quebec sovereignty movement.

On October 27, 22 days after the election, US President Donald Trump congratulated on Truth Social St-Pierre Plamondon for his victory.

== Government formation ==
After the election, all 59 elected Parti Québécois MNAs did not take the Oath to the King (just like they didn't in 2022). It was reported to be the first time a governing party did not swear an oath to the monarchy. The Quebec Liberals would follow suit and not swear an oath to the king. The PQ minority government was sworn-in on October 21.

== See also ==
- 2025 Canadian federal election in Quebec
- 2026 Alberta independence referendum
- 1987 New Brunswick general election – Another election in which the governing party (the Progressive Conservatives) were wiped out
- 1993 Canadian federal election – Another election in which the ruling party suffered a catastrophic wipeout
