= 44th Quebec Legislature =

- Minority parliament
- Dec. 1, 2026 – present

Parliament leaders
- Premier: Paul St-Pierre Plamondon; Oct. 21, 2026 – present
- Leader of the Opposition: Charles Milliard; Oct. 5, 2026 – present

Party caucuses
- Government: Parti Québécois
- Opposition: Liberal
- Recognized: Conservative
- Unrecognized: Québec solidaire

National Assembly
- Government House leader: Catherine Gentilcore; Oct. 21, 2026 – present
- Opposition House leader: André Fortin; Oct. 18, 2026 – present
- Members: 127 MNA seats

Sovereign
- Monarch: Charles III; Sep. 8, 2022 – present
- Lieutenant governor: Manon Jeannotte; Jan. 25, 2024 – present

Sessions
- 1st session December 1, 2026 –
← 43rd	→ 45th

The 44th National Assembly of Quebec consists of those elected in the October 5, 2026, general election. As a result, Paul St-Pierre Plamondon's Parti Québécois government was elected.

== Member list ==
Cabinet ministers are in bold, party leaders are in italic and the president of the National Assembly is marked with a †.

Name	Party	Riding	First elected / previously elected	No. of terms
Stéphane Tremblay	Parti Québécois	Abitibi-Est	2026	1st term
**Sébastien D'Astous**	Parti Québécois	Abitibi-Ouest	2026	1st term
André Albert Morin	Liberal	Acadie	2022	2nd term
Nicolas Plourde	Liberal	Anjou–Louis-Riel	2026	1st term
Pierre Nantel	Parti Québécois	Argenteuil	2026	1st term
Tarek Henoud	Conservative	Arthabaska-L'Érable	2026	1st term
Patricia Drouin	Conservative	Beauce-Nord	2026	1st term
Jonathan Poulin	Conservative	Beauce-Sud	2026	1st term
Alexandre Daneau	Parti Québécois	Beauharnois	2026	1st term
Éric Duhaime	Conservative	Bellechasse	2026	1st term
Audrey Bujold	Parti Québécois	Bellefeuille	2026	1st term
**Elsie Lefebvre**	Parti Québécois	Berthier	2004, (Note: Laurier-Dorion) 2026	2nd term*
Alexandre Girard-Duchaine	Parti Québécois	Bertrand	2026	1st term
Nadine Le Gal	Parti Québécois	Blainville	2026	1st term
Pier-Luc Bujold	Parti Québécois	Bonaventure	2026	1st term
Cédric Gagnon-Ducharme	Parti Québécois	Borduas	2026	1st term
Madwa-Nika Cadet	Liberal	Bourassa-Sauvé	2022	2nd term
Frédéric Beauchemin	Liberal	Brome-Missisquoi	2022	2nd term
**Paul St-Pierre Plamondon**	Parti Québécois	Camille-Laurin	2022	2nd term
Julie Guyot	Parti Québécois	Chambly	2026	1st term
Adriana Szalontai	Conservative	Champlain	2026	1st term
Michel Langevin	Liberal	Chapleau	2026	1st term
Éloïse Coulombe	Conservative	Charlesbourg	2026	1st term
Caroline Simard	Conservative	Charlevoix–Côte-de-Beaupré	2014, (Note: First elected as a Liberal) 2026	2nd term*
Félix Rhéaume	Liberal	Châteauguay	2026	1st term
Karim Elayoubi	Conservative	Chauveau	2026	1st term
**Marie-Karlynn Laflamme**	Parti Québécois	Chicoutimi	2026	2nd term
Madeleine Féquière	Liberal	Chomedey	2026	1st term
Dominique Dumas	Conservative	Chutes-de-la-Chaudière	2026	1st term
Frédéric Poulin	Conservative	Côte-du-Sud	2026	1st term
Elisabeth Prass	Liberal	D'Arcy-McGee	2022	2nd term
Nathalie Boisclair	Parti Québécois	Daniel-Johnson	2026	1st term
Linda Vaillant	Parti Québécois	Deux-Montagnes	2026	1st term
Charles Page	Parti Québécois	Drummond–Bois-Francs	2026	1st term
Émile Simard	Parti Québécois	Dubuc	2026	1st term
**Meggie Richard**	Parti Québécois	Duplessis	2026	1st term
Marie Claude Fournier	Liberal	Fabre	2026	1st term
**Méganne Perry Mélançon**	Parti Québécois	Gaspé	2018, 2026	2nd term*
David Logue	Liberal	Gatineau	2026	1st term
Alexandre Boulerice	Québec solidaire	Gouin	2026	1st term
Jean-François Arsenault	Parti Québécois	Granby	2026	1st term
**Marie-Claude Sarrazin**	Parti Québécois	Groulx	2026	1st term
Alexandre Leduc	Québec solidaire	Hochelaga-Maisonneuve	2018	3rd term
Sacha Cannon	Liberal	Hull	2026	1st term
Frédéric Laplante	Parti Québécois	Huntingdon	2026	1st term
**Camille Pellerin-Forget**	Parti Québécois	Iberville	2026	1st term
**Joël Arseneau**	Parti Québécois	Îles-de-la-Madeleine	2018	3rd term
Gregory Kelley	Liberal	Jacques-Cartier	2018	3rd term
Sol Zanetti	Québec solidaire	Jean-Lesage	2018	3rd term
Filomena Rotiroti	Liberal	Jeanne-Mance–Viger	2008	6th term
Julie White	Liberal	Jean-Talon	2026	1st term
Véronique Venne	Parti Québécois	Joliette	2026	1st term
Jimmy Bouchard	Parti Québécois	Jonquière	2026	1st term
Catherine Drouin	Parti Québécois	Labelle	2026	1st term
William Fradette	Parti Québécois	Lac-Saint-Jean	2026	1st term
Marc Tanguay	Liberal	LaFontaine	2012	6th term
Maïté Blanchette Vézina	Conservative	La Peltrie	2022 (Note: First elected as a CAQ)	2nd term
Linda Caron	Liberal	La Pinière	2022	2nd term
Sonia Ziadé	Liberal	La Prairie	2026	1st term
Maxime Laporte	Parti Québécois	L'Assomption	2026	1st term
Andrés Fontecilla	Québec solidaire	Laurier-Dorion	2018	3rd term
Caroline De Guire	Liberal	Laval-des-Rapides	2026	1st term
Élodie Murphy-Gauthier	Parti Québécois	Laviolette–Saint-Maurice	2026	1st term
**Dieudonné Ella Oyono**	Parti Québécois	Les Plaines	2026	1st term
Karine Laflamme	Conservative	Lévis	2026	1st term
Renaud Labrecque	Conservative	Lotbinière-Frontenac	2026	1st term
Marcos Archambault	Conservative	Louis-Hébert	2026	1st term
Michel Leblanc	Liberal	Marguerite-Bourgeoys	2026	1st term
**Natalie Bisaillon**	Parti Québécois	Marie-Lacoste-Gérin-Lajoie	2026	1st term
**Nicolas Marceau**	Parti Québécois	Marie-Victorin	2009, (Note: Rousseau) 2026	4th term*
Enrico Ciccone	Liberal	Marquette	2018	3rd term
Isabelle Blais	Parti Québécois	Maskinongé	2026	1st term
Stéphane Handfield	Parti Québécois	Masson	2026	1st term
**Pascal Bérubé**	Parti Québécois	Matane-Matapédia-Mitis	2007	7th term
Nada Boumeftah	Liberal	Maurice-Richard	2026	1st term
Jimmy Gagnon	Conservative	Mégantic	2026	1st term
Ruba Ghazal	Québec solidaire	Mercier	2018	3rd term
Virginie Dufour	Liberal	Mille-Îles	2022	2nd term
Geneviève Couture	Parti Québécois	Mirabel	2026	1st term
Mathieu Lavoie	Liberal	Montarville	2026	1st term
Marie-Josée Hélie	Conservative	Montmorency	2026	1st term
Michelle Setlakwe	Liberal	Mont-Royal–Outremont	2022	2nd term
Monsef Derraji	Liberal	Nelligan	2018	3rd term
Guillaume Langlois	Conservative	Nicolet-Bécancour	2026	1st term
Désirée McGraw	Liberal	Notre-Dame-de-Grâce	2022	2nd term
Charles Milliard	Liberal	Orford	2026	1st term
Isabelle Millette	Parti Québécois	Papineau	2026	1st term
David Bowles	Liberal	Pierre-Laporte	2026	1st term
**Stéphane Paquet**	Parti Québécois	Pointe-aux-Trembles	2026	1st term
André Fortin	Liberal	Pontiac	2014	4th term
Marcel Bouchard	Conservative	Portneuf	2026	1st term
**Anne Nguyen**	Parti Québécois	Prévost	2026	1st term
Odette Lavigne	Parti Québécois	René-Lévesque	2026	1st term
**Nicolas Girard**	Parti Québécois	Repentigny	2004, (Note: Gouin) 2026	4th term*
Jocelyn Desjardins	Parti Québécois	Richelieu	2026	1st term
**Bernard Sévigny**	Parti Québécois	Richmond	2026	1st term
Yohann St-Pierre	Parti Québécois	Rimouski	2026	1st term
Ariane Boyer	Parti Québécois	Rivière-du-Loup–Témiscouata–Les Basques	2026	1st term
Brigitte Garceau	Liberal	Robert-Baldwin	2022	2nd term
Isabelle Thibeault	Parti Québécois	Roberval	2026	1st term
Gisèle Pouhe Njall	Québec solidaire	Rosemont	2026	1st term
**Mathieu Lebrun**	Parti Québécois	Rousseau	2026	1st term
Diane Dallaire	Parti Québécois	Rouyn-Noranda–Témiscamingue	2026	1st term
Sylvie Tanguay	Parti Québécois	Saint-François	2026	1st term
Benoit Clermont	Liberal	Saint-Henri–Sainte-Anne	2026	1st term
**Simon-Pierre Savard-Tremblay**	Parti Québécois	Saint-Hyacinthe	2026	1st term
Gaétan Bédard	Parti Québécois	Saint-Jean	2026	1st term
Sandrine Michon	Parti Québécois	Saint-Jérôme	2026	1st term
Valérie Assouline	Liberal	Saint-Laurent	2026	1st term
Roxane Milot	Québec solidaire	Sainte-Marie–Saint-Jacques	2026	1st term
Cécile Tremblay	Liberal	Sainte-Rose	2026	1st term
**Alain Therrien**	Parti Québécois	Sanguinet	2012, 2026	3rd term*
Stéphanie Vachon	Québec solidaire	Sherbrooke	2026	1st term
Olivier Bertin-Mahieux	Liberal	Soulanges	2026	1st term
Sandra Hernández	Parti Québécois	Taillon	2026	1st term
Étienne Grandmont	Québec solidaire	Taschereau	2022	2nd term
**Catherine Gentilcore**	Parti Québécois	Terrebonne	2025	2nd term
**Jean Pellerin**	Parti Québécois	Trois-Rivières	2026	1st term
Sonia Caron	Parti Québécois	Ungava	2026	1st term
Stephan Fogaing	Parti Québécois	Vachon	2026	1st term
Patrick Paquet	Conservative	Vanier-Les Rivières	2026	1st term
James Hughes	Liberal	Vaudreuil	2026	1st term
**Guy Lapointe**	Parti Québécois	Verchères	2026	1st term
Antoine Dionne Charest	Liberal	Verdun	2026	1st term
Frantz Benjamin	Liberal	Viau	2018	3rd term
Louis Ialenti	Liberal	Vimont-Auteuil	2026	1st term
Jennifer Maccarone	Liberal	Westmount–Saint-Louis	2018	3rd term
