= Péladeau =

Péladeau may refer to:

== Persons ==
- Pierre Péladeau (1925-1997), editor and Quebec business man
  - Pierre Karl Péladeau (born in 1961), Quebec businessman, son of the preceding
  - Erik Péladeau, a business man of Quebec (printing), son of the preceding

== Toponyms ==
- Péladeau River, a tributary of the Rivière aux Feuilles
