= Richard Martineau =

French-Canadian commentator (born 1961)

Richard Martineau (born July 29, 1961) is a French-Canadian commentator. He is a columnist for Le Journal de Montréal newspaper. His columns also appear in the Infopresse and Elle Québec magazines. He also hosts Franchement Martineau, a public affairs programme which airs on Le Canal Nouvelles.

Since 1998, he has co-hosted Télé-Québec's Les Francs-tireurs, first with Benoit Dutrizac and Laurent Saulnier and since 2006 with La Presse journalist Patrick Lagacé.

== Career ==
Martineau became known for his column "Ondes de choc" (English: shockwave), which appeared in the Montreal weekly newspaper Voir until 2006. Martineau has also participated in evening debates on Télévision Quatre-Saisons and was the moderator of those debates between May and September 2006. He hosted a radio programme until 2007. Radio Canada has described his work as "established him as a leftist chronicler, then he forged deep to the right and to a posture more and more pamphleteering working within the Quebecor empire."

== Controversy ==
In February 2020, Martineau falsely accused McGill University Professor Daniel Weinstock of supporting female genital mutilation. Weinstock was subsequently disinvited by Quebec Education Minister Jean-François Roberge from speaking at a conference on the Province's ethics and religious culture program. On February 21, Martineau published a non-apology, correcting his error. Roberge apologized publicly to Weinstock on February 23.

== Personal ==
Martineau was born in Verdun on July 23, 1961, to a French mother (born 1940) and an American father (born 1934). He lives in Outremont with his partner Sophie Durocher and their son. He previously lived with fellow journalist Nathalie Collard, with whom he has two daughters.
