= François Desrochers =

Canadian politician and teacher

MNA for Mirabel
- In office April 25, 2007 – November 5, 2008
- Preceded by: Denise Beaudoin
- Succeeded by: Denise Beaudoin

Personal details
- Party: Action démocratique du Québec
- Profession: teacher

François Desrochers is a politician and teacher from Quebec, Canada. He was an Action démocratique du Québec Member of the National Assembly for the electoral district of Mirabel from 2007 to 2008.

Desrochers hold a bachelor's degree in secondary teaching from the Université du Québec à Montréal and is currently doing a master's degree in the same domain at the Université de Sherbrooke Before his election, Desrochers was a public school teacher for nine years in human sciences and was an assistant principal at École secondaire des Patriotes in Saint-Eustache.

Desrochers was first elected for the ADQ (which he was a member since 1995) in the 2007 election with 44% of the vote. Parti Québécois incumbent Denise Beaudoin finished second with 34% of the vote. Desrochers took office on April 12, 2007. On April 19, 2007, he was selected to be the Official Opposition's Shadow Minister of Education.

== Electoral record ==
=== Federal ===
2019 Canadian federal election: Mirabel
Party	Candidate	Votes	%	±%	Expenditures
Bloc Québécois	Simon Marcil	33,219	51.08	+19.59	$7,193.50
Liberal	Karl Trudel	16,162	24.85	-1.26	$36,834.25
Conservative	François Desrochers	5,940	9.13	-1.00	none listed
New Democratic	Anne-Marie Saint-Germain	5,219	8.03	-22.05	$902.88
Green	Julie Tremblay	3,517	5.41	+3.22	$10,545.78
People's	Christian Montpetit	641	0.99		none listed
Indépendance du Québec	Pietro Biacchi	332	0.51		$0.00
Total valid votes/expense limit		65,030	98.06		
Total rejected ballots		1,286	1.94	-0.00	
Turnout		66,316	68.47	-0.43	
Eligible voters		96,848			
Bloc Québécois hold		Swing		+10.41	
Source: Elections Canada

=== Provincial ===
2008 Quebec general election
Party	Candidate	Votes	%	±%
Parti Québécois	Denise Beaudoin	13,700	47.41	+13.33
Liberal	Ritha Cossette	7,207	24.94	+8.85
Action démocratique	François Desrochers	6,522	22.57	-21.86
Green	Simon Cadieux	847	2.93	-0.66
Québec solidaire	Kim Joly	621	2.15	+0.34
Total valid votes		28,897	98.16	–
Total rejected ballots		542	1.84	–
Turnout		29,439	58.65	-16.62
Electors on the lists		50,196	–	–

2007 Quebec general election
Party	Candidate	Votes	%	±%
Action démocratique	François Desrochers	15,241	44.43	+10.05
Parti Québécois	Denise Beaudoin	11,691	34.08	-4.25
Liberal	Ritha Cossette	5,520	16.09	-11.20
Green	Sylvain Castonguay	1,233	3.59	–
Québec solidaire	Jocelyn Parent	620	1.81	–
Total valid votes		34,305	98.84	–
Total rejected ballots		404	1.16	–
Turnout		34,709	75.27	+3.25
Electors on the lists		46,110	–	–

== Footnotes ==
Political offices
Preceded by Camil Bouchard (PQ)	Official Opposition's Shadow Minister of Education; 2007–Current	Succeeded by Incumbent
