= Sylvie D'Amours =

Canadian politician

The Honourable Sylvie D'Amours
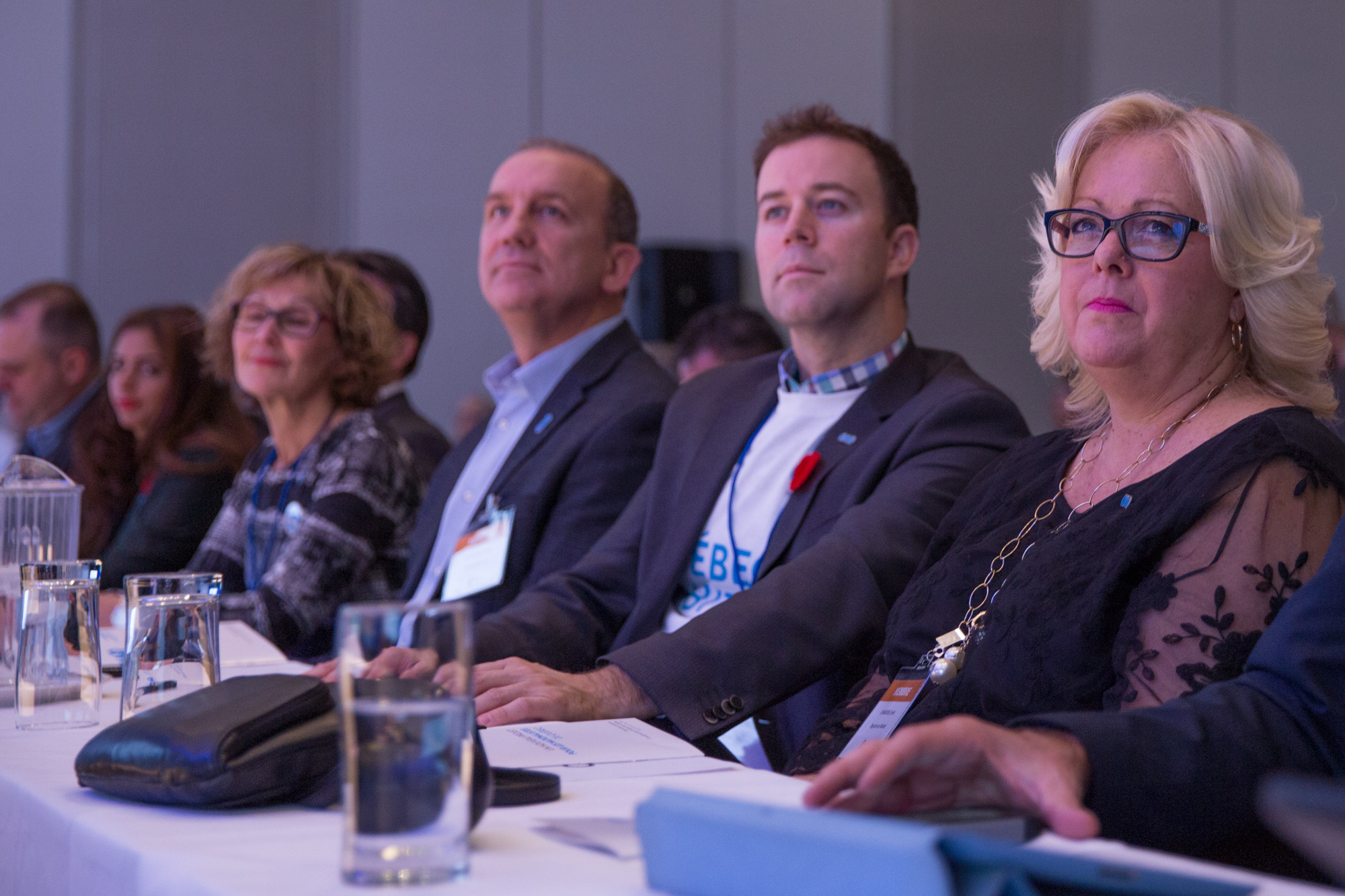

Member of the National Assembly of Quebec for Mirabel
- In office April 7, 2014 – August 27, 2026
- Preceded by: Denise Beaudoin
- Succeeded by: Geneviève Couture

Personal details
- Born: August 19, 1960 (age 66) Malartic, Quebec
- Party: Coalition Avenir Québec

Sylvie D'Amours (born August 19, 1960) is a Canadian politician in Quebec, who was elected to the National Assembly of Quebec in the 2014 election. She represented the electoral district of Mirabel as a member of the Coalition Avenir Québec.

== Early life ==
D'Amours was born in the city of Malartic in the La Vallée-de-l'Or.

== Political career ==
Prior to her election to the legislature, D'Amours was a municipal councillor in Saint-Joseph-du-Lac.

She ran in Mirabel at the 2012 Quebec general election.

She was elected to the National Assembly of Quebec in the 2014 election. D'Amours was re-elected in the 2018 general election and the 2022 general election.

She did not seek re-election in the 2026 general election.

== Electoral record ==
2022 Quebec general election: Mirabel
Party	Candidate	Votes	%	±%
Coalition Avenir Québec	Sylvie D'Amours	21,639	50.11	-4.52
Parti Québécois	Carole Savoie	7,246	16.78	-1.33
Québec solidaire	Marjolaine Goudreau	6,222	14.41	-0.55
Conservative	Gala Durand	4,936	11.43	+10.68
Liberal	Isabella Giosi	2,918	6.76	-2.16
L'Union fait la force	Pierre Larouche	159	0.37	–
Démocratie directe	Rémi Lavoie	64	0.15	–
Total valid votes		43,184	98.53	–
Total rejected ballots		643	1.47	-0.22
Turnout		43,827	68.98	-1.70
Electors on the lists		63,532	–	–
Coalition Avenir Québec hold		Swing		-1.59

2018 Quebec general election: Mirabel
Party	Candidate	Votes	%	±%
Coalition Avenir Québec	Sylvie D'Amours	21,602	54.63	+15.39
Parti Québécois	Denise Beaudoin	7,162	18.11	-16.17
Québec solidaire	Marjolaine Goudreau	5,916	14.96	+8.86
Liberal	Camille Arsenault Brideau	3,526	8.92	-10.43
Green	Émilie Paiement	688	1.74	
Conservative	Désiré Mounanga	296	0.75	+0.2
Bloc Pot	Vincent Laurin	231	0.58	
CINQ	Patricia Vaca	122	0.31	
Total valid votes		39,543	98.31	
Total rejected ballots		680	1.69	
Turnout		40,223	70.69	
Eligible voters		56,903		
Coalition Avenir Québec hold		Swing		+15.78
Source(s) "Rapport des résultats officiels du scrutin". Élections Québec.

2014 Quebec general election
Party	Candidate	Votes	%	±%
Coalition Avenir Québec	Sylvie D'Amours	16,359	39.24	+2.89
Parti Québécois	Denise Beaudoin	14,290	34.28	-9.49
Liberal	Ismaël Boisvert	8,068	19.35	+6.28
Québec solidaire	Mylène Jaccoud	2,543	6.10	+2.31
Conservative	Andre Linskiy	229	0.55	–
Option nationale	Curtis Jean-Louis	200	0.48	-1.74
Total valid votes		41,689	97.95	–
Total rejected ballots		872	2.05	–
Turnout		42,561	70.48	-7.91
Electors on the lists		60,386	–	–
Coalition Avenir Québec gain from Parti Québécois		Swing		+6.19

2012 Quebec general election
Party	Candidate	Votes	%	±%
Parti Québécois	Denise Beaudoin	19,467	43.77	-3.64
Coalition Avenir Québec	Sylvie D'Amours	16,167	36.35	+13.78*
Liberal	Ismaël Boisvert	5,812	13.07	-11.87
Québec solidaire	Mylène Jaccoud	1,687	3.79	+1.64
Option nationale	Jean-François Pouliot	988	2.22	–
Independent	Eric Emond	353	0.79	–
Total valid votes		44,474	98.53	–
Total rejected ballots		664	1.47	–
Turnout		45,138	78.39	+19.74
Electors on the lists		57,581	–	–
Parti Québécois hold		Swing		-8.71

== Cabinet posts ==
Quebec provincial government of François Legault
Cabinet post (1)
Predecessor	Office	Successor
Geoffrey Kelley	Minister responsible for Aboriginal Affairs; October 18, 2018–October 9, 2020	Ian Lafrenière
