= Marc Bourcier =

Canadian politician

Mayor of Saint-Jérôme
- In office November 15, 2021 – November 18, 2025
- Preceded by: Janice Bélair Rolland
- Succeeded by: Rémi Barbeau

Member of the National Assembly of Quebec for Saint-Jérôme
- In office December 5, 2016 – October 1, 2018
- Preceded by: Pierre Karl Péladeau
- Succeeded by: Youri Chassin

Personal details
- Party: Avenir Saint-Jérôme
- Other political affiliations: Parti Québécois (provincial)

Marc Bourcier is a Canadian politician, who served as the mayor of Saint-Jérôme, Quebec from 2021 to 2025. Previously, he was elected to the National Assembly of Quebec in a by-election on December 5, 2016, and served until 2018. He represented the electoral district of Saint-Jérôme as a member of the Parti Québécois caucus. Prior to his by-election in the legislature, he was a city councillor for Saint-Jérôme City Council.

== Electoral record ==
=== Provincial ===
2018 Quebec general election: Saint-Jérôme
Party	Candidate	Votes	%	±%
Coalition Avenir Québec	Youri Chassin	17,225	43.74	+8.26
Parti Québécois	Marc Bourcier	10,800	27.42	-18.81
Québec solidaire	Ève Duhaime	6,243	15.85	+11.47
Liberal	Antoine Poulin	3,534	8.97	-1.61
Green	Annabelle Desrochers	677	1.72	-0.33
Conservative	Normand Michaud	345	0.88	+0.54
Citoyens au pouvoir	Sylvie Brien	294	0.75	
New Democratic	Christine Simon	141	0.36	
Parti libre	Giuseppe Starnino	123	0.31	
Total valid votes		39,382	98.24	
Total rejected ballots		707	1.76	
Turnout		40,089	65.87	
Eligible voters		60,859		
Coalition Avenir Québec gain from Parti Québécois		Swing		+13.54
Source(s) "Rapport des résultats officiels du scrutin". Élections Québec.

Quebec provincial by-election, December 5, 2016
Party	Candidate	Votes	%	±%
Parti Québécois	Marc Bourcier	9,141	46.23	+9.42
Coalition Avenir Québec	Bruno Laroche	7,016	35.48	+3.96
Liberal	Naömie Goyette	2,092	10.58	-9.38
Québec solidaire	Marcel Gosselin	867	4.38	-6.38
Green	Émilianne Lépine	405	2.05	
Option nationale	Olivier Lamanque Galarneau	89	0.45	-0.09
Conservative	Sébastien Roy	67	0.34	-0.07
Parti indépendantiste	Sengtiane Trempe	40	0.20	
CINQ	Eric Emond	34	0.17	
Équipe Autonomiste	Louis Chandonnet	23	0.12	
Total valid votes		19,774	100.00	
Total rejected ballots		232	1.16	-0.54
Turnout		20,006	33.92	-33.33
Electors on the lists		58,973		
Parti Québécois hold		Swing		+2.73
