= Patrick Lagacé =

Canadian journalist for La Presse (born 1972)

Patrick Lagacé (born 1972) is a Canadian columnist and television host who currently publishes columns for La Presse newspaper and hosts a weekly television show on Télé-Québec.

== Biography ==
Lagacé was born in Montreal in 1972.

Lagacé studied communications at the University of Ottawa, where for two years he was editor of the student newspaper francophone La Rotonde. He first worked as a researcher at the radio of Radio-Canada on the morning show CBOF Hello. He has worked on the weekly Le Carillon d'Hawkesbury (Ontario) as well as French daily Le Droit of Ottawa / Gatineau.

He has worked in Journal de Montréal from 1999 until 2007 before moving to La Presse in April 2007. He is also a columnist and has an opinion blog online.

Patrick Lagacé also served as co-director of the newspaper of the Professional Federation of Quebec Journalists (FPJQ, 2000-2001) and was in charge of a course in journalism writing.

He has appeared on a number of radio and television programmes, notably Lapierre et cie on CKAC, Grand journal on TQS, Newsworld on CBC and on LCN. In 2005, he co-hosted the television program Les Francs-tireurs, an opinion program broadcast on the Télé-Québec. He left the program in 2013 citing insurmountable differences between him and his co-host.

In 2006, he won with Richard Martineau, the Gemini prize for Best Animation for a TV magazine. In 2007, Lagacé was nominated for National Newspaper Awards for articles published in La Presse about the Canadian Olympic biathlon champion Myriam Bédard.

For several months in 2016, Montreal police were monitoring Lagacé’s iPhone to determine the identity of his sources.

In February 2019 he became involved in controversy surrounding Ensaf Haidar, wife of blogger, Raif Haidar, imprisoned in Saudi Arabia. He criticised Mrs Haidar for associating with any critics of Islam or the Saudi regime. Mrs Haidar said his attack on her, for not kowtowing to the Saudi regime, was bringing danger upon her and her children.
