= List of Quebec provincial electoral districts =

This list encompasses all Quebec provincial electoral districts, which are pivotal in determining the representation within the National Assembly of Quebec, the province's legislative body. Each of the 127 electoral districts, also known as ridings or constituencies, plays a crucial role in Quebec's democratic process, allowing citizens across the province's 17 administrative regions to elect their representatives. These districts are periodically reviewed and potentially redefined to reflect changes in population and ensure equitable representation.

== List of districts ==
District	Region	Population	Number of electors entered on the list of electors	Land Area (km²)	Population Density (people per km²)
Abitibi-Est	Abitibi-Témiscamingue	44,055	32,822	29,201.80	1.51
Abitibi-Ouest	Abitibi-Témiscamingue	45,290	35,532	11,516.77	3.93
Acadie	West Montreal	82,340	50,178	14.30	5,758.04
Anjou–Louis-Riel	East Montreal	63,611	41,964	17.51	3,632.84
Argenteuil	Laurentides	48,180	40,398	1,947.12	24.74
Arthabaska-L’Érable	Centre-du-Québec	77,225	61,110	1,748.69	44.16
Beauce-Nord	Chaudière-Appalaches	57,245	44,248	1,755.74	32.60
Beauce-Sud	Chaudière-Appalaches and Estrie (Eastern Townships)	63,595	49,837	3,003.56	21.17
Beauharnois	South Shore	68,800	57,252	400.83	171.64
Bellechasse	Chaudière-Appalaches	57,020	45,372	3,163.11	18.03
Bellefeuille	Laurentides	55,275	42,238	229.58	240.77
Berthier	Lanaudière	61,440	50,943	10,206.79	6.02
Bertrand	Laurentides and Lanaudière	64,730	55,570	2,310.49	28.02
Blainville	Laurentides	79,480	60,456	65.90	1,206.07
Bonaventure	Gaspésie–Îles-de-la-Madeleine	40,733	35,898	8,608.85	4.73
Borduas	Eastern Montérégie	71,565	56,407	473.76	151.06
Bourassa-Sauvé	East Montreal	81,450	46,339	10.29	7,915.45
Brome-Missisquoi	Estrie (Eastern Townships)	64,785	53,998	1,697.45	38.17
Camille-Laurin	East Montreal	71,858	49,559	15.34	4,684.35
Chambly	Eastern Montérégie	70,525	52,489	211.54	333.39
Champlain	Mauricie	73,250	60,079	1,899.01	38.57
Chapleau	Outaouais	80,435	59,360	42.47	1,893.93
Charlesbourg	Capitale-Nationale	74,350	57,141	34.28	2,168.90
Charlevoix–Côte-de-Beaupré	Capitale-Nationale	65,840	54,068	11,417.89	5.77
Châteauguay	South Shore	70,595	54,867	197.37	357.68
Chauveau	Capitale-Nationale	76,350	58,171	2,640.28	28.92
Chicoutimi	Saguenay–Lac-Saint-Jean	57,895	45,736	149.03	388.48
Chomedey	Laval	77,470	55,666	18.22	4,251.92
Chutes-de-la-Chaudière	Chaudière-Appalaches	77,200	60,060	301.73	255.86
Côte-du-Sud	Bas-Saint-Laurent and Chaudière-Appalaches	61,385	50,103	6,081.54	10.09
Daniel-Johnson	Estrie (Eastern Townships) and Eastern Montérégie	58,030	47,297	1,849.56	31.38
D'Arcy-McGee	West Montreal	92,930	55,594	12.72	7,305.82
Deux-Montagnes	Laurentides	63,190	49,342	76.49	826.12
Drummond–Bois-Francs	Centre-du-Québec	65,520	52,131	1,789.33	36.62
Dubuc	Saguenay–Lac-Saint-Jean	52,015	42,037	44,217.35	1.18
Duplessis	Côte-Nord	48,090	37,139	249,090.96	0.19
Fabre	Laval	78,795	56,104	40.98	1,922.77
Gaspé	Gaspésie–Îles-de-la-Madeleine	35,955	30,131	11,529.86	3.12
Gatineau	Outaouais	76,855	59,248	15,561.78	4.94
Gouin	East Montreal	61,460	42,222	5.75	10,688.70
Granby	Estrie (Eastern Townships)	72,365	57,732	204.94	353.10
Groulx	Laurentides	68,930	53,907	47.91	1,438.74
Hochelaga-Maisonneuve	East Montreal	59,448	40,557	7.81	7,611.78
Hull	Outaouais	94,660	60,523	53.11	1,782.34
Huntingdon	South Shore	57,950	48,042	2,219.01	26.12
Iberville	Eastern Montérégie	64,145	49,822	1,026.15	62.51
Îles-de-la-Madeleine	Gaspésie–Îles-de-la-Madeleine	12,650	11,176	198.03	63.88
Jacques-Cartier	West Montreal	62,510	46,582	53.71	1,163.84
Jean-Lesage	Capitale-Nationale	59,745	45,658	18.33	3,259.41
Jeanne-Mance–Viger	East Montreal	79,340	49,917	13.48	5,885.76
Jean-Talon	Capitale-Nationale	69,815	46,997	29.10	2,399.14
Joliette	Lanaudière	71,115	57,541	423.31	168
Jonquière	Saguenay–Lac-Saint-Jean	56,325	45,367	401.10	140.43
La Peltrie	Capitale-Nationale	77,880	57,662	600.20	129.76
La Pinière	South Shore	81,625	56,059	42.03	1,942.07
La Prairie	South Shore	65,325	48,517	130.50	500.57
Labelle	Laurentides	62,590	52,440	18,074.84	3.46
Lac-Saint-Jean	Saguenay–Lac-Saint-Jean	54,090	43,835	19,659.70	2.75
LaFontaine	East Montreal	58,066	42,311	23.50	2,470.89
L'Assomption	Lanaudière	71,795	55,098	300.67	238.78
Laurier-Dorion	East Montreal	74,674	45,007	6.19	12,063.65
Laval-des-Rapides	Laval	80,150	56,435	25.05	3,199.60
Laviolette–Saint-Maurice	Mauricie	72,160	59,704	35,010.79	2.06
Les Plaines	Laurentides and Lanaudière	65,615	48,144	213.01	308.04
Lévis	Chaudière-Appalaches	63,160	51,072	56.21	1,123.64
Lotbinière-Frontenac	Chaudière-Appalaches	72,630	57,752	3,232.50	22.47
Louis-Hébert	Capitale-Nationale	58,585	47,037	148.79	393.74
Marguerite-Bourgeoys	West Montreal	82,235	52,784	16.34	5,032.74
Marie-Lacoste-Gérin-Lajoie	Centre-du-Québec	58,305	45,119	984.90	59.20
Marie-Victorin	South Shore	66,315	45,715	14.46	4,586.10
Marquette	West Montreal	65,760	45,705	38.85	1,692.66
Maskinongé	Mauricie	56,775	46,246	2,611.23	21.74
Masson	Lanaudière	65,810	51,386	135.37	486.15
Matane-Matapédia-Mitis	Bas-Saint-Laurent	56,838	46,470	11,090.68	5.12
Maurice-Richard	East Montreal	68,210	46,762	10.24	6,661.13
Mégantic	Estrie (Eastern Townships) and Chaudière-Appalaches	61,885	50,134	5,805.03	10.66
Mercier	East Montreal	69,895	43,735	5.40	12,943.52
Mille-Îles	Laval	66,660	49,129	80.33	829.83
Mirabel	Laurentides	68,370	52,130	467.58	146.22
Montarville	South Shore	68,015	53,338	114.46	594.23
Montmorency	Capitale-Nationale	74,740	58,076	177.11	422
Mont-Royal–Outremont	West Montreal	96,625	56,763	20.05	4,819.20
Nelligan	West Montreal	79,805	57,634	52.04	1,533.53
Nicolet-Bécancour	Centre-du-Québec	49,390	40,371	2,472.14	19.98
Notre-Dame-de-Grâce	West Montreal	73,265	46,794	9.99	7,333.83
Orford	Estrie (Eastern Townships)	54,795	45,302	1,440.35	38.04
Papineau	Outaouais	74,845	58,828	3,587.39	20.86
Pierre-Laporte	Montérégie	74,615	53,357	20.82	3,583.81
Pointe-aux-Trembles	East Montreal	54,262	40,632	31.12	1,743.64
Pontiac	Outaouais	78,350	54,400	14,459.61	5.42
Portneuf	Capitale-Nationale	66,595	53,435	4,220.96	15.78
Prévost	Laurentides	61,360	50,465	380.60	161.22
René-Lévesque	Côte-Nord	40,435	32,495	51,798.85	0.78
Repentigny	Lanaudière	70,715	54,886	27.17	2,602.69
Richelieu	Eastern Montérégie	64,515	53,343	910.45	70.86
Richmond	Estrie (Eastern Townships)	72,780	56,562	1,263.90	57.58
Rimouski	Bas-Saint-Laurent	57,191	46,278	2,770.10	20.65
Rivière-du-Loup–Témiscouata–Les Basques	Bas-Saint-Laurent	63,705	51,392	6,471.88	9.87
Robert-Baldwin	West Montreal	77,275	54,113	23.21	3,329.38
Roberval	Saguenay–Lac-Saint-Jean	55,230	44,548	40,346.24	1.37
Rosemont	East Montreal	76,870	52,571	9.71	7,916.58
Rousseau	Lanaudière	58,430	46,922	714.41	81.79
Rouyn-Noranda–Témiscamingue	Abitibi-Témiscamingue	57,735	44,720	23,531.65	2.45
Sainte-Marie–Saint-Jacques	East Montreal	66,864	41,267	9.63	6,943.30
Sainte-Rose	Laval	74,990	55,438	38.64	1,940.73
Saint-François	Estrie (Eastern Townships)	71,350	54,324	1,418.11	50.31
Saint-Henri–Sainte-Anne	West Montreal	84,550	57,517	15.91	5,314.27
Saint-Hyacinthe	Eastern Montérégie	71,160	55,004	634.20	112.20
Saint-Jean	Eastern Montérégie	77,380	61,098	171.69	450.70
Saint-Jérôme	Laurentides	56,330	45,713	38	1,482.37
Saint-Laurent	West Montreal	93,910	57,660	43.33	2,167.32
Sanguinet	South Shore	58,600	43,811	175.06	334.74
Sherbrooke	Estrie (Eastern Townships)	72,420	53,490	58.73	1,233.10
Soulanges	South Shore	73,010	57,041	731.51	99.81
Taillon	South Shore	74,570	52,919	29.28	2,546.79
Taschereau	Capitale-Nationale	64,045	47,985	12.80	5,003.52
Terrebonne	Lanaudière	71,340	53,935	68.86	1,036.02
Trois-Rivières	Mauricie	70,875	54,737	63.20	1,121.44
Ungava	Nord-du-Québec	45,740	29,657	855,163.20	0.05
Vachon	South Shore	71,640	52,893	61.87	1,157.91
Vanier-Les Rivières	Capitale-Nationale	70,015	56,208	44.55	1,571.60
Vaudreuil	South Shore	82,115	60,203	78.94	1,040.22
Verchères	Eastern Montérégie	70,835	55,010	285.94	247.73
Verdun	West Montreal	70,375	48,830	9.62	7,315.48
Viau	East Montreal	70,417	39,936	10.26	6,863.26
Vimont-Auteuil	Laval	60,305	46,321	43.04	1,401.14
Westmount–Saint-Louis	West Montreal	86,250	48,265	11.78	7,321.73

== Former districts ==
The following districts were eliminated following the 2012 Quebec general election.

- Anjou
- Kamouraska-Témiscouata
- Matane
- Matapédia
- Rivière-du-Loup
- Charlevoix
- Vanier
- Drummond
- Frontenac (1912–1973)
- Frontenac (1972–2011)
- Lotbinière
- Montmagny-L'Islet
- Nicolet-Yamaska
- Mégantic-Compton
- Shefford
- Marguerite-D'Youville
- Prévost

== See also ==
- Canadian provincial electoral districts
