= Pierre Péladeau =

Canadian businessman (1925–1997)

Pierre Péladeau CM OQ
- Born: 12 April 1925; Montreal, Quebec, Canada
- Died: 24 December 1997 (aged 72); Montreal, Quebec, Canada
- Education: Université de Montréal (LPh, MA); McGill University (BCL)
- Occupation: Businessman
- Spouse: Raymonde Chopin (m. 1954)
- Children: 7, including Érik and Pierre Karl

Pierre Péladeau (12 April 1925 – 24 December 1997) was a Canadian businessman. He was the founder of Quebecor Inc., a Canadian media and telecommunications conglomerate in Quebec, Canada.

He was the father of billionaire Pierre Karl Péladeau, former Parti Québécois leader.

== Early life ==
Pierre Péladeau was born in Montreal, Canada, on 12 April 1925, as the youngest of seven children of Henri Péladeau, who had a successful timber business. While Henri Péladeau was on a sales trip to Europe in 1929, the stock market crashed and on his return to Montreal he found that his two partners had taken control of the business. This event undoubtedly affected Pierre Peladeau's attitude to business and his business partners.

Péladeau had four children – Érik, Isabelle, Pierre Karl, and Anne-Marie – with his first wife, Raymonde Chopin, who died in 1976. Pierre Karl Péladeau would serve as CEO of Quebecor before serving one year as leader of the Parti Québécois from May 2015 to May 2016. Érik Péladeau served as a former Vice-Chairman of Quebecor Inc. Péladeau had two children – Simon-Pierre and Esther – with his second wife, Line Parisien, whom he divorced and regretted it. He had a relationship with Manon Blanchette that produced one son and he ended his relationship with his long-term partner, Anne Béland.

Péladeau's time spent with Quebecor meant that he was often an absent father to his children.

In 1987, Péladeau told The Globe and Mail: "I've had all the women I wanted, when I wanted them." He also openly boasted that he only spoke English when he could make a profit by doing so.

In 1989, Péladeau said that women had no place on corporate boards because "they seduce too much". In 1990, Péladeau was quoted in l'Actualite magazine saying that Jews "take up too much space'" in Quebec, and was forced to issue a statement of apology claiming that he meant it in the context of Jewish fashion designers getting the lion's share of coverage from Montreal newspapers.

== Education and career ==
He attended College Jean-de-Brebeuf (a private school also attended by Pierre Elliott Trudeau). He then went on to complete a degree in philosophy at the Université de Montréal, and a law degree at McGill University.

While studying for the bar exam in 1950, Péladeau purchased with a $1,500 loan from his mother, Elmire, a struggling community paper, Le Journal de Rosemont, including their printing works, which became Nouvelles et Potins.

In 1964, the employees of La Presse, the major Montréal French-language newspaper, went on strike, giving Péladeau the room to create his own newspaper, Le Journal de Montréal.

Péladeau's printing business also had ties to Montreal's English-language tabloid press. During the early years of Joe Azaria's Midnight, Péladeau printed the publication. Midnight, founded in Montreal in 1954, later developed into a major North American supermarket tabloid. Péladeau did not acquire Midnight; Azaria later sold it separately, while Quebecor acquired another Azaria publication, the Sunday Express.

=== Quebecor Inc. ===
Péladeau created Quebecor Inc. in 1965, with Le Journal de Montréal as its flagship publication.

In 1977, Péladeau expanded Quebecor into the United States by starting a daily sports-heavy tabloid called The Philadelphia Journal, which was unsuccessful and ended its publication run in 1981. Péladeau later spoke of his failed venture and the loss of his 14 million USD investment as "the most expensive MBA in the United States". Péladeau also went on to acquire printing businesses in France and the United Kingdom, printing Paris Match, among many other well-known publications both in Europe and the USA.

In 1983, Quebecor bought the Winnipeg Sun.

Despite Péladeau's strong support for Quebec sovereignty, he chaired a committee in charge of organization Montreal's Canada Day celebrations in 1987.

Péladeau started The Daily News of Montreal in 1988 in a partnership with British newspaper magnate Robert Maxwell, but the paper closed two years later.

== Death and honours ==
Péladeau suffered a heart attack on December 24, 1997, and fell into a coma. On December 24, Péladeau died at Hotel-Dieu Hospital in Montreal at the age of 72. A private memorial ceremony for Péladeau was planned for December 29 in Sainte Adele's Pavilion des Arts.

At the time of his death, Quebecor had 6.3 billion CAD in revenue and Le Journal de Montreal was the Canadian newspaper with the third largest circulation, as well as being the largest French newspaper in Quebec. Quebecor Printing was North America's second-largest commercial printer. Péladeau left the company to his heirs, and his son, Pierre Karl Péladeau, would become president and CEO in 1999.

In 1987, Péladeau was made a Member of the Order of Canada. In 1989, he was made an Officer of the National Order of Quebec.

In 1999, Quebecor established an annual bursary for young Quebec entrepreneurs award in his name.
