= Stephan Fogaing =

Quebec politician

Stephan Fogaing MNA

Member of the National Assembly for Vachon
- Incumbent
- Assumed office October 5, 2026
- Preceded by: Ian Lafrenière

Personal details
- Party: Parti Québécois

Stephan Fogaing is a Quebec politician who was the elected to the National Assembly of Quebec for Vachon in the 2026 Quebec general election as a member of the Parti Québécois.

Initial results showed Quebec Liberal Party candidate Affine Lwalalika in the lead and an election recount was requested by the Parti Québécois due to the margin of 10 votes. The recount gave Fogaing a victory of 3 votes. He was previously an industrial development advisor for the aerospace sector at the Ministry of the Economy.

== Electoral history ==
2026 Quebec general election: Vachon
** Preliminary results — Not yet official **
Party	Candidate	Votes	%	±%
Parti Québécois	Stephan Fogaing	10,023		
Liberal	Affine Lwalalika	10,020		
Coalition Avenir Québec	Ian Lafrenière	7,614		
Conservative	Martine Boucher	4,763		
Québec solidaire	Magdouda Oudjit	3,807		
Climat Québec	Martine Lajoie	262		
Total valid votes				
Total rejected ballots				
Turnout			68.41	
Electors on the lists			–	–
Source: Élections Québec

2022 Quebec general election: Hochelaga-Maisonneuve
Party	Candidate	Votes	%	±%
Québec solidaire	Alexandre Leduc	12,784	50.84	+0.79
Coalition Avenir Québec	Rebecca McCann	4,728	18.8	+5.91
Parti Québécois	Stephan Fogaing	4,015	15.97	-7.92
Liberal	Line Flore Tchetmi	1,957	7.78	-2.56
Conservative	Louise Poudrier	1,161	4.62	+4.01
Green	Wejden Chouchene	337	1.34	–
Climat Québec	James Strayer	84	0.33	–
Marxist–Leninist	Christine Dandenault	78	0.31	+0.12
Total valid votes		25,144	98,75	
Total rejected ballots		319	1,25	
Turnout		25,436	62.56	
Electors on the lists		40,699		

== See also ==
- 44th Quebec Legislature
