= Lucie Lecours =

Canadian politician (born 1964)

Member of the National Assembly of Quebec for Les Plaines
- In office October 1, 2018 – August 27, 2026
- Preceded by: Riding established
- Succeeded by: Dieudonné Ella Oyono

Personal details
- Born: 1964 (age 61–62) Repentigny, Quebec, Canada
- Party: Coalition Avenir Québec

Lucie Lecours (French pronunciation: [lysi ləkuʁ]; born 1964) is a Canadian politician who was elected to the National Assembly of Quebec in the 2018 provincial election. She represented the electoral district of Les Plaines as a member of the Coalition Avenir Québec (CAQ). She did not seek re-election in the 2026 general election.

== Electoral record ==
2022 Quebec general election: Les Plaines
Party	Candidate	Votes	%	±%
Coalition Avenir Québec	Lucie Lecours	13,922	50.54	-0.67
Parti Québécois	Normand Ouellette	4,444	16.13	-7.58
Québec solidaire	Richard Jr Leblanc	3,668	13.32	-0.54
Conservative	Ian Lavallée	3,333	12.10	+11.01
Liberal	Elizabeth Stavrakakis	1,895	6.88	-1.13
Green	Mohamed Benmoumene	282	1.02	-0.58
Total valid votes		27,544	98.24	–
Total rejected ballots		494	1.76	-0.57
Turnout		28,038	67.59	-1.46
Electors on the lists		41,484	–	–
Coalition Avenir Québec hold		Swing		+3.45

2018 Quebec general election: Les Plaines
Party	Candidate	Votes	%	±%
Coalition Avenir Québec	Lucie Lecours	13,818	51.22	
Parti Québécois	Marc-Olivier Leblanc	6,397	23.71	
Québec solidaire	Kévin St-Jean	3,738	13.85	
Liberal	Vincent Orellana-Pepin	2,160	8.01	
Green	Boris Geynet	434	1.61	
Conservative	Mathieu Laliberté	293	1.09	
Parti libre	Mathieu Stevens	140	0.52	
Total valid votes		26,980	97.67	
Total rejected ballots		645	2.33	
Turnout		27,625	69.05	
Eligible voters		40,009		
Source(s) "Rapport des résultats officiels du scrutin". Élections Québec.
