= Bellefeuille (electoral district) =

Quebec electoral district

Provincial electoral district
- Legislature: National Assembly of Quebec
MNA
Audrey Bujold
Parti Québécois
- District created: 2026
- First contested: 2026
- Last contested: 2026

Demographics
- Census division(s): La Rivière-du-Nord, Mirabel

Bellefeuille (French pronunciation: [bɛlfœj]) is a provincial electoral district in the Laurentides region of Quebec, Canada which elects a member to the National Assembly of Quebec. It includes the western part of the town of Saint-Jérôme, the part of the town of Mirabel located to the north of Autoroute 50 (Saint-Canut) and the municipality of Saint-Colomban.

It was created for the 2026 election from parts of the Saint-Jérôme, Mirabel and Argenteuil electoral districts. Its name refers to the former town of Bellefeuille, now the western part of Saint-Jérôme. It refers also to the river Bellefeuille, which flows through Saint-Jérôme, and to Eustache-Antoine Lefebvre de Bellefeuille.

== Members of the National Assembly ==
Legislature	Years	Member	Party
Riding created from Saint-Jérôme, Mirabel and Argenteuil
44th	2026–Present	Audrey Bujold	Parti Québécois

== Election results ==
2026 Quebec general election
** Preliminary results — Not yet official **
Party	Candidate	Votes	%	±%
Parti Québécois	Audrey Bujold	12,985	41.59	+22.87
Conservative	Pier-Luc Chayer	7,341	23.51	+11.55
Liberal	Maud Laporte-Roy	4,513	14.46	+9.62
Coalition Avenir Québec	Rachel Renaud	3,840	12.30	–35.75
Québec solidaire	Normand Lalonde	2,540	8.14	–7.01
Total valid votes		31,219	98.19	
Total rejected ballots		574	1.81	
Turnout		31,793	70.06	
Electors on the lists		45,378		
Parti Québécois notional gain from Coalition Avenir Québec		Swing		+5.66
Source: Élections Québec

2022 Quebec general election redistributed results
Party	Vote	%
Coalition Avenir Québec	13,008	48.05
Parti Québécois	5,067	18.72
Québec solidaire	4,101	15.15
Conservative	3,239	11.96
Liberal	1,311	4.84
Others	347	1.28
