= Saint-Jérôme (electoral district) =

Provincial electoral district in Quebec, Canada

Quebec electoral district

Provincial electoral district
- Legislature: National Assembly of Quebec
MNA
Sandrine Michon
Parti Québécois
- District created: 2011
- First contested: 2012
- Last contested: 2026

Demographics
- Population (2011): 68,230
- Electors (2014): 56,077
- Area (km²): 92.4
- Pop. density (per km²): 738.4
- Census division: La Rivière-du-Nord (part)
- Census subdivision: Saint-Jérôme

Saint-Jérôme is a provincial electoral district in the Laurentides region of Quebec, Canada, that elects members to the National Assembly of Quebec. It contains part of the city of Saint-Jérôme.

It was created for the 2012 election from part of the former Prévost electoral district. The Prévost electoral district consisted solely of the town of Prévost and of the city of Saint-Jérôme. In the change from the 2001 to the 2011 electoral map, the eponymous municipality of Prévost was moved to the Bertrand electoral district; the Prévost electoral district became defunct and the remaining municipality of Saint-Jérôme became a separate new electoral district in its own right, named after itself.

In 2026, the riding lost the neighbourhoods of Domaine-Raymond, Lac-Filion, Lac-Cloutier, Lac-Massie, Domaine-Richer, Place-Citation, Bellefeuille, Domaine-Ouellette, Domaine-Huot, Domaine-Hatin and Place-Laurier to the new riding of Bellefeuille.

== Members of the National Assembly ==
Legislature	Years	Member	Party
Riding created from Prévost
40th	2012–2014	Jacques Duchesneau	Coalition Avenir Québec
41st	2014–2016	Pierre Karl Péladeau	Parti Québécois
41st	2016–2018	Marc Bourcier	Parti Québécois
42nd	2018–2022	Youri Chassin	Coalition Avenir Québec
43rd	2022–2024	Youri Chassin	Coalition Avenir Québec
43rd	2024–2026	Youri Chassin	Independent
44th	2026–Present	Sandrine Michon	Parti Québécois

== Election results ==
2026 Quebec general election
** Preliminary results — Not yet official **
Party	Candidate	Votes	%	±%
Parti Québécois	Sandrine Michon	11,232	39.50	
Conservative	Myriam Laroche	5,155	18.13	
Coalition Avenir Québec	Carla Pierre-Paul	4,690	16.49	
Liberal	Suzanne Pomerleau	3,732	13.12	
Québec solidaire	Orphée Dubé-Gervais	3,330	11.71	
Climat Québec	Sandra Hould	300	1.05	
Total valid votes				
Total rejected ballots				
Turnout			63.06	
Electors on the lists			–	–
Parti Québécois gain from Coalition Avenir Québec		Swing		+
Source: Élections Québec

2022 Quebec general election redistributed results
Party	Vote	%
Coalition Avenir Québec	13,488	50.21
Parti Québécois	4,991	18.58
Québec solidaire	4,216	15.69
Conservative	2,658	9.89
Liberal	1,163	4.33
Green	348	1.30

2022 Quebec general election
Party	Candidate	Votes	%	±%
Coalition Avenir Québec	Youri Chassin	20,527	50.02	
Parti Québécois	Sandrine Michon	7,727	18.83	
Québec solidaire	Marc-Olivier Neveu	6,411	15.62	
Conservative	Maxime Clermont	3,998	9.74	
Liberal	Martin Plante	1,858	4.53	
Green	Marcella Bustamante	517	1.26	
Total valid votes		41,038	–	
Total rejected ballots		610	–	
Turnout		65.17%		
Electors on the lists		63,909	–	–

2018 Quebec general election
Party	Candidate	Votes	%	±%
Coalition Avenir Québec	Youri Chassin	17,225	43.74	+8.26
Parti Québécois	Marc Bourcier	10,800	27.42	-18.81
Québec solidaire	Ève Duhaime	6,243	15.85	+11.47
Liberal	Antoine Poulin	3,534	8.97	-1.61
Green	Annabelle Desrochers	677	1.72	-0.33
Conservative	Normand Michaud	345	0.88	+0.54
Citoyens au pouvoir	Sylvie Brien	294	0.75	
New Democratic	Christine Simon	141	0.36	
Parti libre	Giuseppe Starnino	123	0.31	
Total valid votes		39,382	98.24	
Total rejected ballots		707	1.76	
Turnout		40,089	65.87	
Eligible voters		60,859		
Coalition Avenir Québec gain from Parti Québécois		Swing		+13.54
Source(s) "Rapport des résultats officiels du scrutin". Élections Québec.

Quebec provincial by-election, December 5, 2016
Party	Candidate	Votes	%	±%
Parti Québécois	Marc Bourcier	9,141	46.23	+9.42
Coalition Avenir Québec	Bruno Laroche	7,016	35.48	+3.96
Liberal	Naömie Goyette	2,092	10.58	-9.38
Québec solidaire	Marcel Gosselin	867	4.38	-6.38
Green	Émilianne Lépine	405	2.05	
Option nationale	Olivier Lamanque Galarneau	89	0.45	-0.09
Conservative	Sébastien Roy	67	0.34	-0.07
Parti indépendantiste	Sengtiane Trempe	40	0.20	
CINQ	Eric Emond	34	0.17	
Équipe Autonomiste	Louis Chandonnet	23	0.12	
Total valid votes		19,774	100.00	
Total rejected ballots		232	1.16	-0.54
Turnout		20,006	33.92	-33.33
Electors on the lists		58,973		
Parti Québécois hold		Swing		+2.73

2014 Quebec general election
Party	Candidate	Votes	%	±%
Parti Québécois	Pierre Karl Péladeau	13,647	36.81	-0.93
Coalition Avenir Québec	Patrice Charbonneau	11,685	31.52	-8.44
Liberal	Armand Dubois	7,400	19.96	+7.40
Québec solidaire	Vincent Lemay-Thivierge	3,991	10.76	+3.60
Option nationale	Mathieu Trottier-Kavanagh	200	0.54	-0.77
Conservative	Bruno Morin	151	0.41	–
Total valid votes		37,074	98.30	–
Total rejected ballots		640	1.70	+0.49
Turnout		37,714	67.25	-8.16
Electors on the lists		56,077	–	–
Parti Québécois gain from Coalition Avenir Québec		Swing		+3.75

2012 Quebec general election
Party	Candidate	Votes	%	±%
Coalition Avenir Québec	Jacques Duchesneau	16,179	39.96	+18.42
Parti Québécois	Gilles Robert	15,282	37.74	-6.14
Liberal	Marc Bustamante	5,087	12.56	-16.36
Québec solidaire	Vincent Lemay-Thivierge	2,903	7.17	+4.11
Option nationale	Julien Benca	532	1.31	–
Green	Olivier Adam	506	1.25	-1.34
Total valid votes		40,489	98.79	–
Total rejected ballots		495	1.21	–
Turnout		40,984	75.41	
Electors on the lists		54,345	–	–
Coalition Avenir Québec gain from Parti Québécois		Swing		+12.28

^ Change is from redistributed results. CAQ change is from ADQ.

2008 Quebec general election redistributed results
Party	Vote	%
Parti Québécois	12,632	43.89
Liberal	8,324	28.92
Action démocratique	6,201	21.54
Québec solidaire	882	3.06
Green	744	2.58

== See also ==
- List of Quebec provincial electoral districts
- Canadian provincial electoral districts
