= Mirabel (provincial electoral district) =

Provincial electoral district in Quebec, Canada

Coordinates: 45°35′N 74°3′W

Quebec electoral district

Provincial electoral district
- Legislature: National Assembly of Quebec
MNA
Geneviève Couture
Parti Québécois
- District created: 2001
- First contested: 2003
- Last contested: 2026

Demographics
- Population (2011): 75,770
- Electors (2012): 57,431
- Area (km²): 708.6
- Pop. density (per km²): 106.9
- Census division(s): Mirabel, Deux-Montagnes (part)
- Census subdivision(s): Mirabel, Oka, Pointe-Calumet, Saint-Joseph-du-Lac, Sainte-Marthe-sur-le-Lac, Saint-Placide; Kanesatake

Mirabel (French pronunciation: [miʁabɛl]) is a provincial electoral district in Quebec, Canada, that elects members to the National Assembly of Quebec. It includes the municipalities of Mirabel, Oka, Pointe-Calumet, Saint-Joseph-du-Lac, Sainte-Marthe-sur-le-Lac and Saint-Placide, and the Mohawk community of Kanesatake.

It was created for the 2003 election from parts of Argenteuil and Deux-Montagnes.

In the change from the 2001 to the 2011 electoral map, its territory was unchanged. In the change from the 2011 to the 2017 electoral map the riding will lose the communities of Saint-Janvier and Saint-Antoine-des-Laurentides to the new riding of Les Plaines.

== Members of the National Assembly ==
Legislature	Years	Member	Party
Riding created from Argenteuil and Deux-Montagnes
37th	2003–2007	Denise Beaudoin	Parti Québécois
38th	2007–2008	François Desrochers	Action démocratique
39th	2008–2012	Denise Beaudoin	Parti Québécois
40th	2012–2014	Denise Beaudoin	Parti Québécois
41st	2014–2018	Sylvie D'Amours	Coalition Avenir Québec
42nd	2018–2022	Sylvie D'Amours	Coalition Avenir Québec
43rd	2022–2026	Sylvie D'Amours	Coalition Avenir Québec
44th	2026–Present	Geneviève Couture	Parti Québécois

== Election results ==
2026 Quebec general election
** Preliminary results — Not yet official **
Party	Candidate	Votes	%	±%
Parti Québécois	Geneviève Couture	15,433	39.81	
Conservative	Francis Brosseau	8,181	21.10	
Liberal	Daniela Rodriguez	6,214	16.03	
Coalition Avenir Québec	Marjolaine Ferron	5,578	14.39	
Québec solidaire	Marjolaine Goudreau	3,006	7.75	
Climat Québec	Danick Soucy	230	0.59	
Canadian	Zenzi Wolker	122	0.31	
Total valid votes				
Total rejected ballots				
Turnout			71.32	
Electors on the lists			–	–
Source: Élections Québec

2022 Quebec general election
Party	Candidate	Votes	%	±%
Coalition Avenir Québec	Sylvie D'Amours	21,639	50.11	-4.52
Parti Québécois	Carole Savoie	7,246	16.78	-1.33
Québec solidaire	Marjolaine Goudreau	6,222	14.41	-0.55
Conservative	Gala Durand	4,936	11.43	+10.68
Liberal	Isabella Giosi	2,918	6.76	-2.16
L'Union fait la force	Pierre Larouche	159	0.37	–
Démocratie directe	Rémi Lavoie	64	0.15	–
Total valid votes		43,184	98.53	–
Total rejected ballots		643	1.47	-0.22
Turnout		43,827	68.98	-1.70
Electors on the lists		63,532	–	–
Coalition Avenir Québec hold		Swing		-1.59

2018 Quebec general election
Party	Candidate	Votes	%	±%
Coalition Avenir Québec	Sylvie D'Amours	21,602	54.63	+15.39
Parti Québécois	Denise Beaudoin	7,162	18.11	-16.17
Québec solidaire	Marjolaine Goudreau	5,916	14.96	+8.86
Liberal	Camille Arsenault Brideau	3,526	8.92	-10.43
Green	Émilie Paiement	688	1.74	
Conservative	Désiré Mounanga	296	0.75	+0.2
Bloc Pot	Vincent Laurin	231	0.58	
CINQ	Patricia Vaca	122	0.31	
Total valid votes		39,543	98.31	
Total rejected ballots		680	1.69	
Turnout		40,223	70.69	
Eligible voters		56,903		
Coalition Avenir Québec hold		Swing		+15.78
Source(s) "Rapport des résultats officiels du scrutin". Élections Québec.

2014 Quebec general election
Party	Candidate	Votes	%	±%
Coalition Avenir Québec	Sylvie D'Amours	16,359	39.24	+2.89
Parti Québécois	Denise Beaudoin	14,290	34.28	-9.49
Liberal	Ismaël Boisvert	8,068	19.35	+6.28
Québec solidaire	Mylène Jaccoud	2,543	6.10	+2.31
Conservative	Andre Linskiy	229	0.55	–
Option nationale	Curtis Jean-Louis	200	0.48	-1.74
Total valid votes		41,689	97.95	–
Total rejected ballots		872	2.05	–
Turnout		42,561	70.48	-7.91
Electors on the lists		60,386	–	–
Coalition Avenir Québec gain from Parti Québécois		Swing		+6.19

2012 Quebec general election
Party	Candidate	Votes	%	±%
Parti Québécois	Denise Beaudoin	19,467	43.77	-3.64
Coalition Avenir Québec	Sylvie D'Amours	16,167	36.35	+13.78*
Liberal	Ismaël Boisvert	5,812	13.07	-11.87
Québec solidaire	Mylène Jaccoud	1,687	3.79	+1.64
Option nationale	Jean-François Pouliot	988	2.22	–
Independent	Eric Emond	353	0.79	–
Total valid votes		44,474	98.53	–
Total rejected ballots		664	1.47	–
Turnout		45,138	78.39	+19.74
Electors on the lists		57,581	–	–
Parti Québécois hold		Swing		-8.71

* Result compared to Action démocratique

2008 Quebec general election
Party	Candidate	Votes	%	±%
Parti Québécois	Denise Beaudoin	13,700	47.41	+13.33
Liberal	Ritha Cossette	7,207	24.94	+8.85
Action démocratique	François Desrochers	6,522	22.57	-21.86
Green	Simon Cadieux	847	2.93	-0.66
Québec solidaire	Kim Joly	621	2.15	+0.34
Total valid votes		28,897	98.16	–
Total rejected ballots		542	1.84	–
Turnout		29,439	58.65	-16.62
Electors on the lists		50,196	–	–

2007 Quebec general election
Party	Candidate	Votes	%	±%
Action démocratique	François Desrochers	15,241	44.43	+10.05
Parti Québécois	Denise Beaudoin	11,691	34.08	-4.25
Liberal	Ritha Cossette	5,520	16.09	-11.20
Green	Sylvain Castonguay	1,233	3.59	–
Québec solidaire	Jocelyn Parent	620	1.81	–
Total valid votes		34,305	98.84	–
Total rejected ballots		404	1.16	–
Turnout		34,709	75.27	+3.25
Electors on the lists		46,110	–	–

2003 Quebec general election
Party	Candidate	Votes	%
Parti Québécois	Denise Beaudoin	10,577	38.33
Action démocratique	Hubert Meilleur	9,486	34.38
Liberal	Réal Proulx	7,529	27.29
Total valid votes		27,592	98.06
Total rejected ballots		545	1.94
Turnout		28,137	72.02
Electors on the lists		39,066	–

== See also ==
- List of Quebec provincial electoral districts
- Canadian provincial electoral districts
