= Denise Beaudoin =

Canadian businessperson, lawyer, and politician

MNA for Mirabel
- In office April 14, 2003 – March 26, 2007
- Preceded by: first member
- Succeeded by: François Desrochers
- In office December 8, 2008 – April 7, 2014
- Preceded by: François Desrochers
- Succeeded by: Sylvie D'Amours

Personal details
- Born: February 24, 1949 (age 77) Lachute, Quebec, Canada
- Party: Parti Québécois

Denise Beaudoin (born February 24, 1949) is a Canadian businessperson, lawyer, and former politician. She was first elected to represent the riding of Mirabel in the National Assembly of Quebec in the 2003 provincial election, but was defeated in the 2007 provincial election by François Desrochers of the Action démocratique du Québec. She was subsequently re-elected in the 2008 and 2012 provincial elections and defeated again in the 2014 provincial election by Sylvie D'Amours of the Coalition Avenir Québec. She is a member of the Parti Québécois.

Born in Lachute, Quebec, Beaudoin is a graduate of the University of Ottawa and the Université de Montréal obtaining a bachelor's degree as well as a law licence from Ottawa. She became a member of the Quebec Bar in 1976 and practised law from 1977 to 1994. In addition, she was the owner/co-owner of several small businesses or facilities in the lower Laurentides region. She was also a member of the Lac des Deux-Montagnes and Lachute Chamber of Commerce.

From 1994 to 2000 she was a parliamentary assistant and juridical counsellor for the Bloc Québécois MPs.
