= Pierre Karl Péladeau =

Canadian politician

Pierre Karl Péladeau OQ
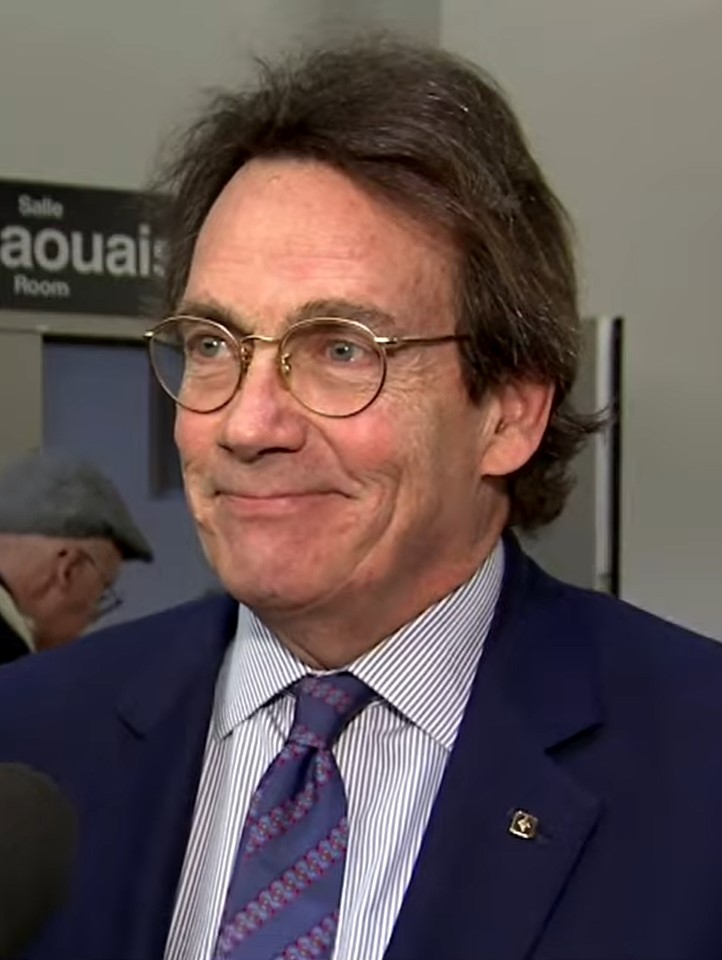
- Péladeau in 2024

Leader of the Opposition in Quebec
- In office 15 May 2015 – 2 May 2016
- Preceded by: Stéphane Bédard
- Succeeded by: Sylvain Gaudreault

Leader of the Parti Québécois
- In office 15 May 2015 – 2 May 2016
- Preceded by: Stéphane Bédard (interim)
- Succeeded by: Sylvain Gaudreault (interim)

Member of the National Assembly of Quebec for Saint-Jérôme
- In office 7 April 2014 – 2 May 2016
- Preceded by: Jacques Duchesneau
- Succeeded by: Marc Bourcier

Personal details
- Born: Pierre-Carl Péladeau; 16 October 1961 (age 65) Montreal, Quebec, Canada
- Party: Parti Québécois
- Spouses: Pascale Bourbeau; Julie Snyder (2001–2014, 2015–2016); Isabelle Hervet (1994–2000)
- Children: 5
- Parent: Pierre Péladeau (father)
- Education: Collège Jean-de-Brébeuf; UQAM; Université de Montréal
- Occupation: Businessman, politician

Pierre Karl Péladeau (French: [pjɛʁ kaʁl pelado]; born 16 October 1961), also known by his initials PKP, is a Canadian businessman, billionaire and former politician. Péladeau is the president and CEO of Quebecor Inc. He was also the Member of the National Assembly for Saint-Jérôme. He is seen as a "strong Quebec nationalist" who has wielded his media properties to influence Quebec politics. Péladeau previously owned Sun Media Corporation.

Péladeau was the Leader of the Opposition in the Quebec National Assembly from his election as leader of the Parti Québécois on 15 May 2015 until his resignation on 2 May 2016 for family reasons.

== Life and career ==
Péladeau is the son of the Quebecor founder Pierre Péladeau (1925–1997) and his first wife Raymonde Chopin (1927–1976). His siblings are Érik Péladeau, Anne-Marie Péladeau, Isabelle Péladeau, Simon-Pierre Péladeau, Esther Péladeau and Jean B. Péladeau. He was educated in Montreal and Paris, especially at Université Paris VIII. He attended the Collège Jean-de-Brébeuf. He holds a degree in philosophy from Université du Québec à Montréal and a law degree from Université de Montréal.

Péladeau was so inspired by Karl Marx while attending university that he changed his middle name from "Carl" to "Karl".

== Business career ==
Péladeau joined his father's management team at an early age. He is known to be confrontational with unions and has used lock-out tactics at least 14 times. He counted Brian Mulroney amongst his business associates. Péladeau sits on the boards of several Quebecor companies.

Péladeau first started in acquisition and business development participating in the acquisition of BCE Publitech which made Quebecor the largest printer in Canada. He played a leading role in the acquisition of Maxwell Graphics which gave the company a significant presence in the U.S. market. He was also involved in the acquisition of Donohue Inc., a North American pulp and paper company.

Péladeau was appointed president of Quebecor Communications Inc. in 1991. This division included the company's main publishing assets and some distribution and retail operations.

In 1994, Péladeau relocated to Paris to help his company's growth. As president of Quebecor Printing Europe he developed the new subsidiary through a series of acquisitions in France, the United Kingdom and Spain, building it into Europe's largest printer.

In 1997, after the sudden death of his father, he returned to the Montreal head office to assume the position of executive vice president and chief operating officer of Quebecor Printing Inc. with overall responsibility for the company's worldwide operations.

In 1998, Péladeau spearheaded the acquisition of Sun Media Corporation, making Quebecor the second largest newspaper chain in Canada.

In 1999, he carried out the acquisition of World Color Press by Quebecor Printing Inc. The acquisition created Quebecor World Inc., one of the world's largest printers. Quebecor World had, at one time, operations in 17 countries on three continents and employed approximately 35,000 employees. In 1999 the board of directors of Quebecor Inc. named him president and CEO of the company.

In 2000, with the support of the Caisse de dépôt et placement du Québec, he acquired Videotron Group, the largest cable operator in Québec, third largest in Canada and owner of the country's leading French-language broadcaster, TVA.

Shortly afterwards all of the company's media properties were brought under one roof with the creation of Quebecor Media, of the largest media operations in Canada as of 2026. It is engaged in newspaper publishing (Journal de Montréal, Journal de Québec, 24heures), cable television, Internet access provider and local telephony (Vidéotron ltée), broadcasting (Groupe TVA), Web technology and integration, Internet portals (QUB), book and magazine publishing (TVA Publications Inc.), retailing of books and entertainment products (Québecor Sports et divertissement, Musicor, GESTEV) and business telecommunications (Vidéotron ltée).

In 2008, Quebecor World went bankrupt as the printing business collapsed. Péladeau allegedly resented the failure of the Royal Bank of Canada and the English Canadian business establishment to refinance Quebecor World's debt.

In March 2013, Péladeau announced he was stepping down as CEO of Québecor and was succeeded in May 2013 by Vidéotron's then-President Robert Depatie. Péladeau was to continue to work for the company in corporate strategy.

Péladeau returned as Quebecor's CEO and President on 16 February 2017, with Brian Mulroney remaining as chairman.

=== Sports Ownership ===
In 2009, Péladeau was in a bidding war with the Molson family for the Montreal Canadiens hockey franchise. During the sale process, Péladeau criticized the appointment of Jacques Martin as Canadiens coach. Péladeau lost out to the scions of the Canadian brewing giant, and an article published in Quebecor's Journal de Québec noted Péladeau's "regret" that Canadiens owner George Gillett "preferred financial considerations, while [Péladeau] would have liked the Canadiens to be based on a Québécois identity." Péladeau then tried to purse an NHL franchise for Quebec City.

In 2023, Péladeau purchased the Montreal Alouettes of the Canadian Football League.

== Political career ==
=== Activism and political influence ===
Péladeau's views have been described as "strongly Quebec nationalist, if not outright sovereignist" and has been noted for using his views to shape Quebec. In 2000, he told the Globe and Mail that he had no interest in politics and was more interested in running Quebecor. His media properties have been noted for their disdain for the political left. Le Journal de Montreal, a property owned by Quebecor, is noted for pushing support on Quebec Independence through tabloid-style exposés on Quebec identity politics. However, the Sun News Network, a former property of Quebecor, was noted for supporting right-wing populism and trying to engage in Anti-Quebec sentiment.

In 2011, actor and then Parti Québécois MNA Pierre Curzi opposed his party's Bill 204, a contract which prevented legal challenges between Quebecor and the Quebec City government for the Centre Vidéotron. Curzi described the bill as "anti-democratic" and believes that this led Péladeau to cut him off from Quebecor productions.

On 15 May 2013, Péladeau was appointed by Pauline Marois to be chairman of the board of directors of Hydro-Québec, the largest hydroelectric producer and distributor in Canada. He resigned in March 2014 to pursue his political ambitions.

After Péladeau resigned from the Parti Québécois in 2016, he was noted for trying to use his media properties for political gain. In 2018, he was critical of Alexandre Taillefer on social media. Taillefer later told Paul Arcand in a radio interview that he believed Péladeau uses his properties to influence the views of the Quebec public. Marsha Barber, a professor from the Toronto Metropolitan University School of Journalism told Global News argued that "it's very unusual to have a majority shareholder who is involved to a great degree in politics and in the electoral process" as a reference to Péladeau.

=== MNA and leader of the Parti Quebecois ===
On 9 March 2014, Péladeau announced his candidacy for that year's election as a star candidate for the Parti Québécois in the riding of Saint-Jérôme, which is contiguous with the Montreal exurb of the same name just north-east of Mirabel Airport. He was not previously known to be a sovereigntist, although with pronouncements such as the fact that he wants "Quebec to be a country" and that he is "in it for sovereignty" he promptly established himself as such. The federal government chose in early March not to comment on Péladeau's decision to embrace the PQ and Quebec sovereignty. "We have no intention of getting involved in a provincial election," said Denis Lebel, federal Minister of Intergovernmental Affairs, and Minister of Economic Development Agency of Canada for the Regions of Quebec in Stephen Harper's government.

Quebec Liberal leader and Leader of the Opposition Philippe Couillard, along with Coalition Avenir Québec leader François Legault, felt that if the PQ won another term, it would be a severe conflict of interest for the owner of half the media outlets in Quebec to be a government backbencher. Péladeau had in 2010 refused to meet with John Gomery, president of the Conseil de presse du Quebec, over his withdrawal from the Conseil of two of Quebecor's newspapers, the Journal de Montréal and the Journal de Québec.

Péladeau's selection alienated voters on several fronts. He had a reputation for being a union-buster due to his frequent use of lockouts, a significant liability both in a province that is 40 percent unionized and in a party that had long billed itself as a social democratic party. At the same time, his unabashed support for sovereigntism alienated many voters who did not want to vote on the sovereignty issue again. Indeed, according to The Globe and Mail, the PQ's poll numbers flatlined soon after Péladeau announced his candidacy and did not recover.

Péladeau was elected in the Saint-Jérôme riding with 37 percent of the vote. His first day at the National Assembly was on 26 May 2014, eight days after a bike accident in the Eastern Townships left him with four fractures.

Following much speculation, Péladeau officially entered the Parti Québécois leadership race in November.

Péladeau's wealth and status as principal shareholder of Québecor, the province's largest media firm, were leading issues during the campaign. The Péladeau campaign outspent the second place candidate, Alexandre Cloutier, by over five times, spending a total $415,000, with Cloutier spending $79,598.

On 15 May 2015, Péladeau was elected leader of the Parti Québécois with 57% of party votes. He resigned from his position and from his seat in the National Assembly on 2 May 2016.

== Personal life ==
Péladeau has a daughter from his previous relationship with Isabelle Hervet, a native of France.

He was in a long-term relationship with Julie Snyder, which produced two children. Their separation was announced in December 2013, but the couple later reconciled and were married on 15 August 2015 in Quebec City, Quebec. They separated again in January 2016, less than five months after their marriage. They divorced in 2016.

His girlfriend Marie-Christine Couture was discovered dead in October 2016 at her home in Montreal. Police suspected it was from suicide.

Péladeau dated Lucie Laurier, a Canadian actress, for a while.

As of 2021, he is in a relationship with model and artist Pascale Bourbeau. They have two boys.

In 2025, Forbes estimated his net worth at about $2.4 billion.

Péladeau is active in many charitable and cultural organizations.
