= Le Journal de Montréal =

Daily tabloid newspaper published in Canada

- The April 26, 2012, front page of Le Journal de Montréal
- Type: Daily newspaper
- Format: Tabloid
- Owner: Quebecor
- Founder: Pierre Péladeau
- Founded: 1964
- Political alignment: Right-wing, Quebec nationalism, Quebec sovereigntism
- Language: French
- Headquarters: 4545, rue Frontenac; Montreal, Quebec; H2H 2R7
- Circulation: 231,069 weekdays 241,485 Saturdays; 229,497 Sundays in 2015
- Sister newspapers: 24 Hours
- ISSN: 0839-5179
- OCLC number: 502914813
- Website: journaldemontreal.com

Le Journal de Montréal is a daily French-language tabloid newspaper published in Montreal, Quebec, Canada. It has the largest circulation of any newspaper in Quebec and is also the largest French-language daily newspaper in North America. Established by Pierre Péladeau in 1964, it is owned by Quebecor Media, and is hence a sister publication of TVA flagship CFTM-DT. It is also Canada's largest tabloid newspaper. Its head office is located on 4545, rue Frontenac in Montreal.

Le Journal de Montréal covers mostly local and provincial news, as well as sports, arts and justice. It has draw praise for its investigation desk launched in 2013 but criticism known for its sensationalist news, and its columnists who are often public figures.

== History ==
Taking advantage of a labor dispute in La Presse, the leading daily newspaper in Montreal at the time, businessman Pierre Péladeau launched a new tabloid newspaper. The first issue was launched on newsstands June 15, 1964. Although Péladeau's newspaper would evolve for several years, the first edition was compiled in a single weekend.

Over the years, the newspaper gained a substantial share of an increasingly important market, sending a significant number of copies to the American state of Florida—Florida being a popular destination for snowbird Quebecers.

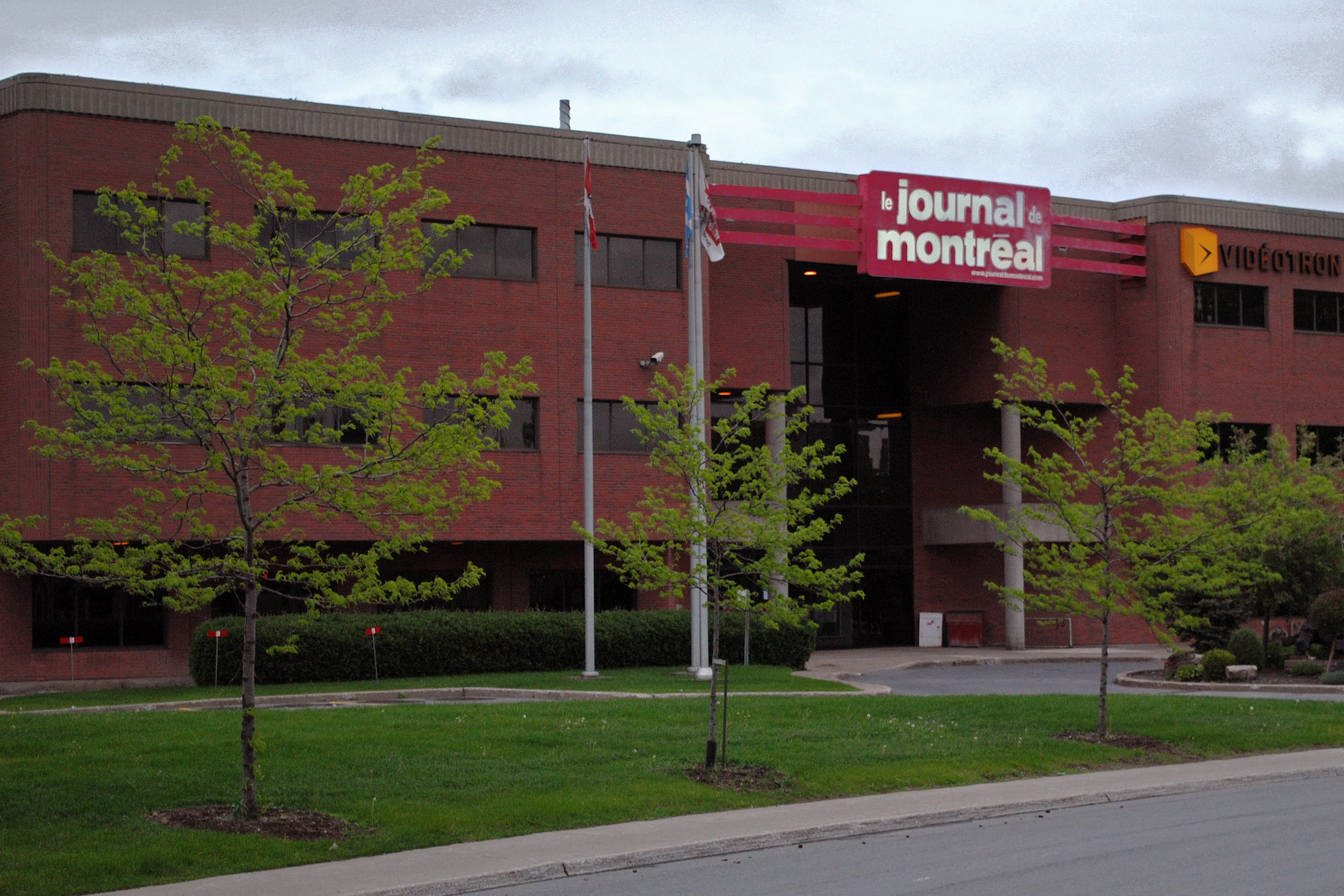
The headquarters of Le Journal de Montréal on Rue Frontenac in Montreal

In the wake of its expansion, the paper enlisted the services of several renowned journalists who previously had worked for competitors, including Jacques Beauchamp and André Rufiange. One of the key journalists of this tabloid was Gérard Cellier, a French immigrant who landed in Quebec in 1956. When launching the Le Journal de Montréal, Pierre Peladeau could rely on Cellier's services to carry out the destiny of the tabloid. Appointed Director in 1964, Cellier remained in office until 1985, eventually becoming director of information and production. For 21 years he was largely responsible for the success of this newspaper, and in many respects, was one of the spearheads of the Quebecor empire. He died of cancer in 1997.

The Courrier du cœur was maintained by Réjeanne Desrameaux, a prominent personality in the arts in Quebec. Then, following the death of Desrameaux, Solange Harvey took over the column, known as 'Le courrier de Solange' for 25 years. She was hired by Jacques Beauchamp in 1976.

Le Journal de Montréal earned a reputation as a sports and news item oriented newspaper until the early 2000s. Inspired by the tabloids of Britain, it has gradually specialized in investigating reports and infiltrations. The space allocated to news items has decreased significantly and opinion pages have appeared.

Le Journal de Montréal has a more populist tone than that of its main competitors. It is also distinguished by its investigative journalism. In 2003, one of its journalists, Brigitte McCann, infiltrated the Raëlians, over the course of nine months, before publishing a series of reports and eventually a book. Following a series of investigations into the Hells Angels motorcycle gang, reporter Michel Auger became the victim of an attempted assassination by individuals associated with the outlaw motorcycle gang.

In September 2005, the newspaper underwent a major graphical overhaul to make it appear more modern. This change was accompanied by the addition of several new columnists, including journalist and television host Richard Martineau, former Quebec government ministers Yves Séguin and Joseph Facal, former federal government Minister Sheila Copps, former hockey player Guy Lafleur and the ex-hacker Mafiaboy.

== Circulation ==
Le Journal de Montréal has seen like most Canadian daily newspapers a decline in circulation. Its total circulation dropped by 14 percent to 232,332 copies daily from 2009 to 2015. Until 2023, it was the only Montreal newspaper that prints on Sundays due to La Presse and The Gazette dropping their Sunday editions and moving online.

Daily average

== Columnists ==
- Benôit Aubin
- Michel Beaudry
- Mathieu Bock-Côté
- Denise Bombardier
- Julie Couture
- Christian Dufour
- Éric Duhaime
- Mario Dumont
- Sophie Durocher
- Nathalie Elgrably-Lévy
- Joseph Facal
- Guy Fournier
- Michel Hébert
- Richard Latendresse
- Jean-Marc Léger
- Isabelle Maréchal
- Richard Martineau
- Jean-Luc Mongrain
- Gilles Proulx
- Lise Ravary
- Jean-Jacques Samson

== Criticism ==
=== Anti-Competitive practices ===
In July 2016, the Journal de Montréal filed an injunction against its satirical newspaper, Le Journal de Mourréal. This decision was immediately perceived as a violation of freedom of expression and garnered support from numerous artists, such as Mike Ward, as well as from many lawyers who were willing to defend the case pro bono following the launch of a crowdfunding campaign, and from the Quebec public. In its application, Agence QMI claimed that the online publication was causing confusion among "ordinary people who are rather busy."

=== Reprimandation from Conseil de presse du Québec ===
In March 2010, the Conseil de presse du Québec reprimanded Le Journal de Montréal for providing incomplete information, which could lead to misinterpretation, regarding an article about a demonstration held in honour of Fredy Villanueva. The decision was upheld by the Press Council's Appeals Commission. In September 2012, the Conseil de presse du Québec again reprimanded Le Journal de Montréal for inaccurate information, discriminatory remarks, and prejudice against the Coalition large de l’Association pour une solidarité syndicale étudiante. In January 2017, the Conseil de presse du Québec issued a severe reprimand to the website journaldemontreal.com for inaccurate information.

=== Allegations of selective political coverage ===
Le Journal de Montréal is owned by Quebecor, which is run by former leader of the separatist Parti Québécois, Pierre Karl Péladeau. The Journal is noted for pushing support on Quebec Independence through tabloid-style exposés on Quebec identity politics. Former Journal de Montreal writer Toula Drimonis raised concerns about how the Péladeau owned properties where not only trying to shape how Quebecers see themselves and the rest of Canada, but also how the rest of Canada sees Quebec. She points to an story about how Journal published a story about in the 2012 Quebec general election, about how the Unité permanente anticorruption visited the Quebec Liberals but omitted how the PQ were also visited by.

In 2018, Péladeau was critical businessmman Alexandre Taillefer on social media. Taillefer then told Paul Arcand in a radio interview that he believes Péladeau uses his properties to influences the views of Quebecois. Taillefer pointed out an article and opinion piece by Journal de Montreal that came after Péladeau's comment as reason of his belief and asked the question "is the editorial position of Quebecor media properties in line with the well-known political positions of their owner?”.

In November 2025 Le Journal de Montréal, after it reported that Quebec Liberal Party members were allegedly financially rewarded for voting for Pablo Rodriguez in the 2025 Quebec Liberal Party leadership election; he denied the accusations. The payments were reportedly nicknamed "brownies". The Unité permanente anticorruption confirmed that it opened an investigation in December 2025 in which he did later. In August 2026, La Presse and Noovo Info both reported that the provincial anti-corruption police, Unité permanente anticorruption, and Élections Québec investigations had cleared Rodriguez, finding that he did not have any links to vote buying schemes. UPAC investigators also reportedly believed that the initial JdM report may have been part of setup targeting Rodriguez.

In December 2025, the Journal de Montreal published a story where former citizenship and immigration minister Sergio Marchi was suggested by Prime Minister Jean Chretien to speed up citizenship applications during the 1995 Quebec referendum as a way for the No side to win. The Hill Times argued that this story was Péladeau's attempt to create sentiment against the federal government of Canada. They pointed out how the story was not picked by other Quebec news outlets such as La Presse nor Radio-Canada. The Hill Times also pointed that the Journal rehashed a 1996 story by former La Presse journalist Chantal Hébert as well as the 2007 Grenier Commission on the referendum found no irregularities with the citizenship applications being sped up and no impact on the vote.

=== Treatment of staff ===
On January 24, 2009, Quebecor Media locked out 243 of its unionized staff, who are members of the Confédération des Syndicats Nationaux. At the heart of the dispute, was the increased convergence between media outlets in the group, job cuts in the classified advertising and accounting departments, and the lengthening of the workweek. Three days after the conflict began, a strike mandate was passed by the affected employees. The locked out workers published their own, competing newspaper, called Rue Frontenac, which was published on paper weekly and more often online. Le Journal de Montréal continued to publish with the use of strikebreakers, managers, and wire services. After 25 months on strike, 64% of unionized employees agreed to a settlement proposal submitted by an arbitrator to the case.

Former employees have taken an issues with Journal columnist. On February 19 2020, Journal de Montréal published by columnist Richard Martineau, a story falsely accusing McGill Faculty of Law professor Daniel Weinstock as a supporter of genital mutilation. This led to Weinstock being disinvited by Quebec’s education minister Jean-François Roberge. It was then revealed the assertion that Martineau, made the claim based of, never proved that Weinstock supported it and he omitted that a 2015 paper were Weinstock stated that he opposed the practice. This led to four young journalists, such as Vanessa Destiné, quitting the company. Former Journal columnist Lise Ravary revealed that while the Journal management support diverse points of view on the pages, it prioritizes its star columnists.

On April 22, 2021, Journal de Montréal was condemned by all major Quebec parties for a front page cover linking prime minister Justin Trudeau's India trip to COVID-19 virus. One of the unions representing workers was also critical of the front page by stating that it negatively impact "our reputation and our credibility as journalists" and that they deal with the fallout of the decision.

== See also ==
- List of Quebec media
- List of newspapers in Canada

Montreal newspapers:

- The Gazette
- La Presse
- Le Devoir
- Métro (defunct)
- Montreal Daily News (defunct)
- Montreal Star (defunct)
