= Christiane Pelchat =

Canadian politician

MNA for Vachon
- In office 1985–1994
- Preceded by: David Payne
- Succeeded by: David Payne

Personal details
- Born: August 28, 1959 (age 66) Saint-Hubert, Quebec
- Party: Liberal

Christiane Pelchat (born August 28, 1959) is a former Canadian politician, who represented the electoral district of Vachon in the National Assembly of Quebec from 1985 to 1994. She was a member of the Quebec Liberal Party.

She is the president of Quebec's provincial Council on the Status of Women from November 30, 2006 to August 15, 2011, when she was named Quebec's delegate-general in Mexico City.
