= David Payne (politician) =

Canadian diplomat and politician

MNA for Vachon
- In office April 13, 1981 – December 2, 1985
- Succeeded by: Christiane Pelchat
- In office September 12, 1994 – April 14, 2003
- Preceded by: Christiane Pelchat
- Succeeded by: Camil Bouchard

Personal details
- Born: January 12, 1944 (age 82) Middlesbrough, England
- Party: Parti Québécois
- Portfolio: Culture, Communications, Environment

David Payne (born January 12, 1944) is a diplomat and former politician. He is a former member of the National Assembly of Quebec, Canada, from the constituency of Vachon. During his time in the National Assembly he was one of two anglophone MNAs within the Parti Québécois parliamentary caucus.

Payne was born and raised in Middlesbrough, England in North Yorkshire. He graduated with a degree in philosophy from the Pontifical Gregorian University and earned a diploma in sociology at the Université catholique de Louvain. His Doctoral studies (IP) are in the field of democratization in post-conflict societies.

== Career ==
Payne moved to Quebec in 1971 to become the Directeur Général du Centre d'accueil des immigrants. From 1973 to 1976, he taught at Vanier College. In 1976, he was appointed Executive Secretary in the Executive Council of Quebec premier René Lévesque. He wrote Autant de façons d'être Québécois (So many ways to be Québécois), and headed up the public hearings into the future of the Anglophone community of the Lower North Shore producing "La Basse-Cote Nord- perspectives et développement".

He was appointed Secretary to the Commission of Inquiry on the mining disaster of Belmoral in northern Quebec in 1979.

He was elected to the provincial legislature as the Member for the new district of Vachon in 1981, but was defeated in 1985 and 1989, only to be re-elected (with strong majorities) in 1994 and 1998. He did not run in 2003.

In 1984 he was present in the National Assembly when a gunman, Denis Lortie, entered the building and detained a number of employees in the Quebec Parliament, killing three employees, and wounding several others.

He was appointed Secretary General of Environnement 2000, a government supported agency preparing policies towards the Rio Summit later that year.

He was appointed President of the permanent Commission on Culture and Communications. He directed a number of government missions to various countries, notably in Asia and South America. As the only anglophone in the PQ caucus at the time, he was a frequent guest on Canadian television and radio media concerning Quebec constitutional and language affairs.

For many years, Payne was Delegate (Quebec) of the Commonwealth Parliamentary Association.

In 1996, he was appointed Parliamentary Secretary to the Premier of Quebec. Payne left his seat in 2003 to become Economic and Commercial Delegate of Quebec to China.

Subsequently, he joined the National Democratic Institute (Washington, US) as Director of Legislative Programs in Kosovo. Later he occupied a similar post for United Nations Development Program (UNDP) in Afghanistan.
