= Les Plaines =

Provincial electoral district in Quebec, Canada

Quebec electoral district

Provincial electoral district
- Legislature: National Assembly of Quebec
MNA
Dieudonné Ella Oyono
Parti Québécois
- First contested: 2018
- Last contested: 2026

Demographics
- Population (2016): 54,060
- Electors (2017): 39,425
- Census division(s): Mirabel, Thérèse-De Blainville, Les Moulins
- Census subdivision(s): Sainte-Anne-des-Plaines (all), Mirabel (part), Terrebonne (part)

Les Plaines (French pronunciation: [le plɛn]; lit. 'The Plains') is a provincial electoral district in Quebec, Canada, located in the Laurentides and Lanaudière regions. Its member of the National Assembly of Quebec has been Lucie Lecours of the Coalition Avenir Québec (CAQ) since it was first contested in the 2018 general election.

== History ==
Les Plaines was established in 2017. It was first contested in the 2018 general election. In 2026 ahead of the general election part of the constituency of Terrebonne was ceded to Les Plaines.

== Geography ==
Les Plaines comprises Sainte-Anne-des-Plaines and part of Mirabel and Terrebonne northwest of Montreal.

== Members of the National Assembly ==
Legislature	Years	Member	Party
Riding created from Mirabel, Blainville and Masson
42nd	2018–2022	Lucie Lecours	Coalition Avenir Québec
43rd	2022–2026	Lucie Lecours	Coalition Avenir Québec
44th	2026–Present	Dieudonné Ella Oyono	Parti Québécois

== Election results ==
2026 Quebec general election
** Preliminary results — Not yet official **
Party	Candidate	Votes	%	±%
Parti Québécois	Dieudonné Ella Oyono	12,983	38.98	+22.85
Conservative	Habib Diarra	7,022	21.08	+8.98
Liberal	Agathe Owona	5,464	16.41	+9.53
Coalition Avenir Québec	Fatou Diop	4,198	12.60	–37.94
Québec solidaire	Irène Dubé	2,894	8.69	–4.63
Independent	Maxime Émilie Savoie	521	1.56	N/A
Démocratie directe	Félix-Alexandre Bernier	224	0.67	N/A
Total valid votes		33,306	97.83	–0.41
Total rejected ballots		739	2.17	+0.41
Turnout		34,045	68.22	+0.63
Electors on the lists		49,905		
Parti Québécois gain from Coalition Avenir Québec		Swing		+6.94
Source: Élections Québec

2022 Quebec general election
Party	Candidate	Votes	%	±%
Coalition Avenir Québec	Lucie Lecours	13,922	50.54	-0.67
Parti Québécois	Normand Ouellette	4,444	16.13	-7.58
Québec solidaire	Richard Jr Leblanc	3,668	13.32	-0.54
Conservative	Ian Lavallée	3,333	12.10	+11.01
Liberal	Elizabeth Stavrakakis	1,895	6.88	-1.13
Green	Mohamed Benmoumene	282	1.02	-0.58
Total valid votes		27,544	98.24	–
Total rejected ballots		494	1.76	-0.57
Turnout		28,038	67.59	-1.46
Electors on the lists		41,484	–	–
Coalition Avenir Québec hold		Swing		+3.45

2018 Quebec general election
Party	Candidate	Votes	%	±%
Coalition Avenir Québec	Lucie Lecours	13,818	51.22	
Parti Québécois	Marc-Olivier Leblanc	6,397	23.71	
Québec solidaire	Kévin St-Jean	3,738	13.85	
Liberal	Vincent Orellana-Pepin	2,160	8.01	
Green	Boris Geynet	434	1.61	
Conservative	Mathieu Laliberté	293	1.09	
Parti libre	Mathieu Stevens	140	0.52	
Total valid votes		26,980	97.67	
Total rejected ballots		645	2.33	
Turnout		27,625	69.05	
Eligible voters		40,009		
Source(s) "Rapport des résultats officiels du scrutin". Élections Québec.

== See also ==
- List of Quebec provincial electoral districts
- Canadian provincial electoral districts
