= Vachon (electoral district) =

Provincial electoral district in Quebec, Canada

Coordinates: 45.49°N 73.40°W

Quebec electoral district
- Location in Longueuil

Provincial electoral district
- Legislature: National Assembly of Quebec
MNA
Stephan Fogaing
Parti Québécois
- District created: 1980
- First contested: 1981
- Last contested: 2026

Demographics
- Population (2021): 71,643
- Electors (2021): 52,770
- Area (km²): 61.87
- Pop. density (per km²): 1,158
- Census division: Longueuil (part)
- Census subdivision: Longueuil (part)

Vachon (French pronunciation: [vaʃɔ̃]) is a provincial electoral district in the Montérégie region of Quebec, Canada, that elects members to the National Assembly of Quebec. It is located within the city of Longueuil and includes most of the borough of Saint-Hubert.

It was created for the 1981 election from a part of Taillon electoral district and is named after early Quebec aviation pioneer Roméo Vachon, who worked at Trans-Canada Airlines; the district includes Montréal/Saint-Hubert Airport.

In the change from the 2001 to the 2011 electoral map, its territory was unchanged.

== Members of the National Assembly ==
This riding has elected the following members of the National Assembly:

Legislature	Years	Member	Party
Riding created from Taillon
32nd	1981–1985	David Payne	Parti Québécois
33rd	1985–1989	Christiane Pelchat	Liberal
34th	1989–1994	Christiane Pelchat	Liberal
35th	1994–1998	David Payne	Parti Québécois
36th	1998–2003	David Payne	Parti Québécois
37th	2003–2007	Camil Bouchard	Parti Québécois
38th	2007–2008	Camil Bouchard	Parti Québécois
39th	2008–2010	Camil Bouchard	Parti Québécois
39th	2010–2012	Martine Ouellet	Parti Québécois
40th	2012–2014	Martine Ouellet	Parti Québécois
41st	2014–2017	Martine Ouellet	Parti Québécois
41st	2017–2018	Martine Ouellet	Independent
42nd	2018–2022	Ian Lafrenière	Coalition Avenir Québec
43rd	2022–2026	Ian Lafrenière	Coalition Avenir Québec
44th	2026–Present	Stephan Fogaing	Parti Québécois

== Election results ==
2026 Quebec general election
** Preliminary results — Not yet official **
Party	Candidate	Votes	%	±%
Parti Québécois	Stephan Fogaing			
Liberal	Affine Lwalalika			
Coalition Avenir Québec	Ian Lafrenière			
Conservative	Martine Boucher			
Québec solidaire	Magdouda Oudjit			
Climat Québec	Martine Lajoie			
Total valid votes				
Total rejected ballots				
Turnout			68.41	
Electors on the lists				
Electors on the lists			–	–
Élections Québec

2022 Quebec general election
Party	Candidate	Votes	%	±%
Coalition Avenir Québec	Ian Lafrenière	15,984	44.91	
Liberal	Yves Mbattang	5,718	16.07	
Québec solidaire	Jean-Philippe Samson	5,343	15.01	
Parti Québécois	Adam Wrzesien	4,757	13.37	
Conservative	Martine Boucher	3,166	8.90	
Green	Juan Carlos Nino Caita	404	1.14	–
Climat Québec	Jean-Pierre Lacombe	217	0.61	–
Total valid votes		35,589	98.64	–
Total rejected ballots		491	1.36	–
Turnout		36,080	68.37	
Electors on the lists		52,770	–	–
Source(s) "Résultats des élections générales du 3 octobre 2022". Élections Québec.

2018 Quebec general election
Party	Candidate	Votes	%	±%
Coalition Avenir Québec	Ian Lafrenière	15,625	43.61	+18.33
Liberal	Linda Caron	7,536	21.03	-11.55
Parti Québécois	Patrick Ney	6,106	17.04	-16.02
Québec solidaire	André Vincent	5,194	14.5	+7.21
New Democratic	Ian Lecourtois	453	1.26	
Conservative	Lise des Greniers	436	1.22	
Bloc Pot	Hugo Bluntss	278	0.78	
Citoyens au pouvoir	Stéphane Marginean	200	0.56	
Total valid votes		35,828	98.15	
Total rejected ballots		676	1.85	
Turnout		36,504	70.86	
Eligible voters		51,519		
Coalition Avenir Québec gain from Parti Québécois		Swing		+14.94
Source(s) "Rapport des résultats officiels du scrutin". Élections Québec.

2014 Quebec general election
Party	Candidate	Votes	%	±%
Parti Québécois	Martine Ouellet	11,983	33.06	-6.53
Liberal	Michel Bienvenu	11,809	32.58	+11.37
Coalition Avenir Québec	Stephane Robichaud	9,164	25.28	-4.38
Québec solidaire	Sebastien Robert	2,644	7.29	+2.24

2012 Quebec general election
Party	Candidate	Votes	%	±%
Parti Québécois	Martine Ouellet	14,723	39.59	
Coalition Avenir Québec	Jean-François Roberge	11,030	29.66	
Liberal	Linda Langlois Saulnier	7,885	21.21	
Québec solidaire	Sebastien Robert	1,878	5.05	

Quebec provincial by-election, July 5, 2010
Party	Candidate	Votes	%	±%
Parti Québécois	Martine Ouellet	7,863	59.15	+10.51
Liberal	Simon-Pierre Diamond	3,236	24.34	−7.94
Action démocratique	Alain Dépatie	879	6.61	−7.06
Québec solidaire	Sébastien Robert	727	5.47	+3.23
Green	Yvon Rudolphe	419	3.15	−0.01
Independent	Denis Durand	98	0.74	−2.42
Independent	Régent Millette	71	0.53	-
Total valid votes		13,293	100.00	
Rejected and declined votes		174		
Turnout		13,467	29.25	−32.23
Electors on the lists		46,046		

Source: Official Results, Le Directeur général des élections du Québec.

2008 Quebec general election
Party	Candidate	Votes	%	±%
Parti Québécois	Camil Bouchard	13,312	48.64	+13.76
Liberal	Georges Painchaud	8,835	32.28	+7.59
Action démocratique	Jean-François Denis	3,742	13.67	-20.53
Green	Denis Durand	866	3.16	-0.79
Québec solidaire	Vincent Lagacé	613	2.24	-0.04

2007 Quebec general election
Party	Candidate	Votes	%	±%
Parti Québécois	Camil Bouchard	11,560	34.88	-5.57
Action démocratique	Maro Akoury	11,333	34.20	+16.91
Liberal	Brigitte Mercier	8,184	24.69	-15.08
Green	Denis Durand	1,309	3.95	+2.33
Québec solidaire	Richard St-Onge	755	2.28	+1.41

2003 Quebec general election
Party	Candidate	Votes	%	±%
Parti Québécois	Camil Bouchard	12,960	40.45	-9.30
Liberal	Brigitte Mercier	12,741	39.77	+5.36
Action démocratique	Joëlle Lescop	5,540	17.29	+2.22
Bloc Pot	Denis Durand	519	1.62	-
UFP	Richard St-Onge	279	0.87	+0.40

1998 Quebec general election
Party	Candidate	Votes	%	±%
Parti Québécois	David Payne	16,993	49.75	+0.89
Liberal	Sophie Joncas	11,755	34.41	-3.45
Action démocratique	Rose Paquet Cyr	5,147	15.07	+4.05
Independent	Richard St-Onge	161	0.47	-
Innovator	André Plante	103	0.30	-

1995 Quebec referendum
Side	Votes	%
Oui	21,374	56.76
Non	16,284	43.24

1994 Quebec general election
Party	Candidate	Votes	%	±%
Parti Québécois	David Payne	15,685	48.86	+3.70
Liberal	André Nadeau	12,154	37.86	-7.64
Action démocratique	Alain Riendeau	3,536	11.02	-
Natural Law	Robert Turgeon	300	0.93	-
Economic	Denis Gagnon	254	0.79	-
Sovereignty	Guillaume Pereira	170	0.53	-

1992 Charlottetown Accord referendum
Side	Votes	%
Non	26,333	64.14
Oui	14,721	35.86

1989 Quebec general election
Party	Candidate	Votes	%	±%
Liberal	Christiane Pelchat	15,468	45.50	-3.97
Parti Québécois	David Payne	15,354	45.16	-1.71
Green	Yvon Rudolphe	1,216	3.58	-
Independent	Daniel Dufour	979	2.88	-
New Democrat	Réjean Benoit	620	1.82	-0.26
Parti 51	Paul Ducharme	223	0.66	-
United Social Credit	Yves Rioux	138	0.41	-

1985 Quebec general election
Party	Candidate	Votes	%	±%
Liberal	Christiane Pelchat	16,011	49.47	+10.27
Parti Québécois	David Payne	15,169	46.87	-10.98
New Democrat	Michael Kakura Jr.	673	2.08	-
Parti indépendantiste	Daniel Courville	511	1.58	-

1981 Quebec general election
Party	Candidate	Votes	%
Parti Québécois	David Payne	17,671	57.85
Liberal	Jacques Roy	11,972	39.20
Union Nationale	Jean Paul Côté	901	2.95

== See also ==
- List of Quebec provincial electoral districts
- Canadian provincial electoral districts
