= Youri Chassin =

Canadian politician

Member of the National Assembly of Quebec for Saint-Jérôme
- In office October 1, 2018 – August 27, 2026
- Preceded by: Marc Bourcier
- Succeeded by: Sandrine Michon

Personal details
- Born: 1977 Sainte-Agathe-des-Monts, Quebec, Canada
- Party: Independent
- Occupation: Economist

Youri Chassin is a Canadian politician, who was elected to the National Assembly of Quebec in the 2018 provincial election. He represented the electoral district of Saint-Jérôme as an independent, and was originally elected as a member of the Coalition Avenir Québec.

Chassin worked as a researcher and economist with the Montreal Economic Institute, in November 2010 to March 2017. Prior to this, he was an economic analyst at the Quebec Employers Council (CPQ) and an economist at the Centre for Interuniversity Research and Analysis on Organizations (CIRANO). His interest in public policy issues goes back to his university days during which he collaborated with the Quebec Federation of University Students (FEUQ), with the Conseil permanent de la jeunesse and with Force Jeunesse.

Chassin is openly gay. In December 2020, Chassin was found to have travelled overseas despite public health orders to avoid nonessential travel overseas. Chassin claimed his trip was to see his husband who lived in Peru and that it was essential and not a vacation, saying "In other circumstances, I would not have come to Peru, but this is a special case." The trip was pre-approved by Quebec Premier François Legault.

In September 2024, Chassin announced he was resigning from the Coalition Avenir Québec party and would sit the remainder of his term as an independent.

He did not seek re-election in the 2026 general election.

== Electoral record ==
2022 Quebec general election: Saint-Jérôme
Party	Candidate	Votes	%	±%
Coalition Avenir Québec	Youri Chassin	20,527	50.02	
Parti Québécois	Sandrine Michon	7,727	18.83	
Québec solidaire	Marc-Olivier Neveu	6,411	15.62	
Conservative	Maxime Clermont	3,998	9.74	
Liberal	Martin Plante	1,858	4.53	
Green	Marcella Bustamante	517	1.26	
Total valid votes		41,038	–	
Total rejected ballots		610	–	
Turnout		65.17%		
Electors on the lists		63,909	–	–

2018 Quebec general election: Saint-Jérôme
Party	Candidate	Votes	%	±%
Coalition Avenir Québec	Youri Chassin	17,225	43.74	+8.26
Parti Québécois	Marc Bourcier	10,800	27.42	-18.81
Québec solidaire	Ève Duhaime	6,243	15.85	+11.47
Liberal	Antoine Poulin	3,534	8.97	-1.61
Green	Annabelle Desrochers	677	1.72	-0.33
Conservative	Normand Michaud	345	0.88	+0.54
Citoyens au pouvoir	Sylvie Brien	294	0.75	
New Democratic	Christine Simon	141	0.36	
Parti libre	Giuseppe Starnino	123	0.31	
Total valid votes		39,382	98.24	
Total rejected ballots		707	1.76	
Turnout		40,089	65.87	
Eligible voters		60,859		
Coalition Avenir Québec gain from Parti Québécois		Swing		+13.54
Source(s) "Rapport des résultats officiels du scrutin". Élections Québec.
