= Sandrine Michon =

Sandrine Michon MNA

Member of the National Assembly for Saint-Jérôme
- Incumbent
- Assumed office October 5, 2026
- Preceded by: Youri Chassin

Personal details
- Party: Parti Québécois

Sandrine Michon is a Canadian politician who is a candidate for the National Assembly of Quebec for Saint-Jérôme in the 2026 Quebec general election as a member of the Parti Québécois.

Prior to her election, Michon was the director of the Alliance du personnel professionnel et technique de la santé et des services sociaux.

== Electoral record ==
2026 Quebec general election: Saint-Jérôme
** Preliminary results — Not yet official **
Party	Candidate	Votes	%	±%
Parti Québécois	Sandrine Michon	11,232	39.50	
Conservative	Myriam Laroche	5,155	18.13	
Coalition Avenir Québec	Carla Pierre-Paul	4,690	16.49	
Liberal	Suzanne Pomerleau	3,732	13.12	
Québec solidaire	Orphée Dubé-Gervais	3,330	11.71	
Climat Québec	Sandra Hould	300	1.05	
Total valid votes				
Total rejected ballots				
Turnout			63.06	
Electors on the lists			–	–
Parti Québécois gain from Coalition Avenir Québec		Swing		+
Source: Élections Québec
