= Camil Bouchard =

Canadian politician

MNA for Vachon
- In office April 14, 2003 – January 6, 2010
- Preceded by: David Payne
- Succeeded by: Martine Ouellet

Personal details
- Born: October 27, 1945 (age 80) La Tuque, Quebec
- Party: Parti Québécois
- Spouse: Tamara Lemerise
- Profession: Teacher, Researcher
- Portfolio: Environment

Camil Bouchard (born October 27, 1945) is a Canadian Quebec politician, teacher and psychology researcher. He was a Member of National Assembly of Quebec from 2003 to 2010, representing the riding of Vachon in Longueuil. He is a member of the Parti Québécois.

He went to Université Laval and obtained a bachelor's and master's degree in psychology. He would add a doctorate at McGill University in 1974. He was then a teacher and researcher at the department of psychology at the Université du Québec à Montréal for 28 years. He was one of the founding members of the Research Lab in Human and Social Ecology in 1979.

Bouchard entered politics in 2003 and was elected in Vachon. He was later named the critic for social solidarity and poverty and then the critic in family and education. Bouchard was narrowly re-elected in 2007, surviving a regional swing to the Action démocratique du Québec. He was the PQ critic for environmental affairs.

On December 14, 2009, he announced his resignation as MNA. The resignation took effect on January 6, 2010.
