= Audrey Bujold =

Canadian politician

Audrey Bujold MNA

Member of the National Assembly for Bellefeuille
- Incumbent
- Assumed office October 5, 2026
- Preceded by: constituency established

Personal details
- Party: Parti Québécois

Audrey Bujold is a Canadian politician who is a candidate for the National Assembly of Quebec for Bellefeuille in the 2026 Quebec general election as a member of the Parti Québécois.

Bujold is a former health researcher and clinical nurse.
