= Geneviève Couture =

Geneviève Couture MNA

Member of the National Assembly for Mirabel
- Incumbent
- Assumed office October 5, 2026
- Preceded by: Sylvie D'Amours

Personal details
- Party: Parti Québécois

Geneviève Couture is a Canadian politician who is a candidate for the National Assembly of Quebec for Mirabel in the 2026 Quebec general election as a member of the Parti Québécois.

Couture was PQ co-spokesperson on SMEs and energy issues.

== Electoral record ==
2026 Quebec general election: Mirabel
** Preliminary results — Not yet official **
Party	Candidate	Votes	%	±%
Parti Québécois	Geneviève Couture	15,433	39.81	
Conservative	Francis Brosseau	8,181	21.10	
Liberal	Daniela Rodriguez	6,214	16.03	
Coalition Avenir Québec	Marjolaine Ferron	5,578	14.39	
Québec solidaire	Marjolaine Goudreau	3,006	7.75	
Climat Québec	Danick Soucy	230	0.59	
Canadian	Zenzi Wolker	122	0.31	
Total valid votes				
Total rejected ballots				
Turnout			71.32	
Electors on the lists			–	–
Source: Élections Québec
