= Dieudonné Ella Oyono =

Gabonese-Canadian economist

Dieudonné Ella Oyono MNA

Member of the National Assembly for Les Plaines
- Incumbent
- Assumed office October 5, 2026
- Preceded by: Lucie Lecours

Personal details
- Party: Parti Québécois
- Website: https://pq.org/nos-candidats/dieudonne-ella-oyono/

Dieudonné Ella Oyono is Gabonese-Quebecois politician. He holds a team leader position in the economic development department of the City of Montreal and is a lecturer at the School of Management Sciences of the University of Quebec at Montreal (UQAM). He was the president of the Parti Québécois (PQ) between November 2019 and 2021.

== Biography ==
In Libreville, Gabon, Dieudonné Ella Oyono studied economics at Omar Bongo University. In 2001, at the age of 27, he pursued doctoral studies in Montreal, Quebec, thanks to a scholarship from Gabon. He then decided to settle in Montreal, began teaching economics at UQAM (Université du Québec à Montréal), and eventually joined the Quebec public service. In 2006, he became a market analyst at the Ministry of Agriculture. In 2008, he obtained a position as an economic advisor at the Quebec Ministry of Economy. Finally, in 2010, within that ministry, he was promoted to assistant regional director.

Alongside his career as a civil servant, Dieudonné Ella Oyono began to get involved in the labour movement, within the Quebec Government Professional Employees Union . He also founded Afrique Canada Opportunités, an organization dedicated to integration and business development between Quebec and Africa.

In 2018, he published a book: How to Fall in Love with Your New Country . Finally, he became involved with the Parti Québécois in 2012. He was an unsuccessful PQ candidate in the riding of Saint-Henri–Sainte-Anne in 2018, and subsequently became president of the party's riding association in Pointe-aux-Trembles.

In November 2019, he was elected president of the party's national executive council unopposed.

He was elected to the National Assembly of Quebec for Les Plaines in the 2026 Quebec general election. Oyono was then appointed Minister of International Relations, La Francophonie, and Foreign Trade.
