= Daniel Weinstock =

Canadian philosopher

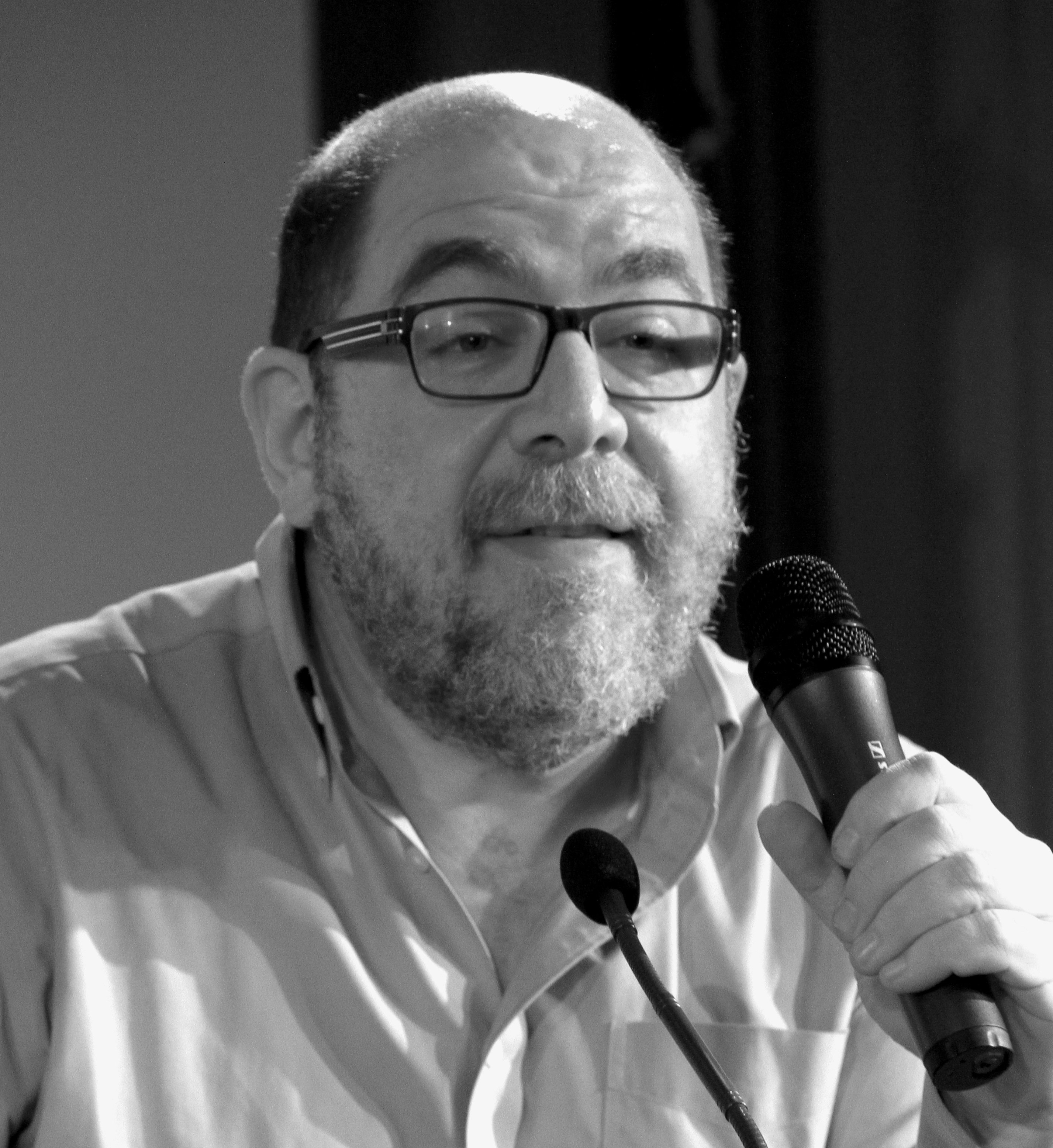
Photo of Daniel Weinstock

Daniel Marc Weinstock CM (born 1963) is a Canadian philosopher and full professor at the Faculty of Law of McGill University. He holds a DPhil in philosophy (Oxford), an MA in political philosophy, and a BA in French literature and political philosophy (McGill). Daniel Weinstock studied with Charles Taylor, and with John Rawls.

His research studies contemporary moral philosophy and political philosophy, and explores how legal, ethical and empirical considerations interact in the making of public policy.

== Life ==
He is married to McGill University history professor Elizabeth Elbourne. They have three children, the oldest of whom, Emma Elbourne-Weinstock, ran as a candidate for the New Democratic Party in the Montreal riding of NDG-Westmount, in the 2021 federal election.

== Career ==
He joined McGill Law in August 2012. He was director of the McGill Institute for Health and Social Policy from 2013 to 2020.

Before joining McGill, Daniel Weinstock was a Professor of Philosophy at the Université de Montréal, where he held the Canadian Research Chair on Ethics and Political Philosophy. He was also the director of the Research Centre on Ethics at Université de Montréal (CRÉUM).

He is a member of Centre d'études ethniques des universités montréalaises (Université de Montréal).

== Prizes and awards ==
- Fellow of the Pierre Elliott Trudeau Foundation (2004)
- André-Laurendeau Prize given by the Association canadienne-française pour l’avancement des sciences (2008).
- James McGill Professor (2014 to 2020)
- 2017 Charles Taylor Prize for Excellence in Policy Research from the Broadbent Institute.
- Katharine A. Pearson Chair in Civil Society and Public Policy (2021-)
- Order of Canada (2023)
