= La Presse =

Canadian online newspaper

- Type: Online newspaper
- Format: Tablet digital, Website, Mobile app
- Owner(s): La Presse Inc. (a non-profit corporation)
- President: Pierre-Elliott Levasseur
- Editor: Guy Crevier
- Founded: 1884
- Ceased publication: 2017 (print edition)
- Language: French
- Headquarters: 750, boulevard Saint-Laurent; Montreal, Quebec; H2Y 2Z4
- Country: Canada
- Circulation: 204,948 daily; 263,888 Saturday; (as of 2011)
- ISSN: 0317-9249
- OCLC number: 299333147
- Website: lapresse.ca

La Presse is a French-language online newspaper published daily in Montreal, Quebec, Canada. Founded in 1884, it is now owned by an independent nonprofit trust.

La Presse was formerly a broadsheet daily, considered a newspaper of record in Canada. Its Sunday edition was discontinued in 2009, and the weekday edition in 2016. The weekend Saturday printed edition was discontinued on 31 December 2017, turning La Presse into an entirely online newspaper.

== Audience and sections ==
La Presse is published on its website, lapresse.ca, as well as on its mobile and tablet apps, La Presse Mobile and La Presse+. The newspaper targets an educated, middle-class readership. Its main competitors are two Montreal print dailies, the tabloid-format Le Journal de Montréal, which aims at a more populist audience, and the more left-leaning broadsheet Le Devoir.

La Presse comprises several sections, dealing individually with arts, sports, business and economy and other themes. Its Saturday print edition (now discontinued) contained over 10 sections.

The newspaper's archives from 2000 to 2019 are available on its website.

== History ==
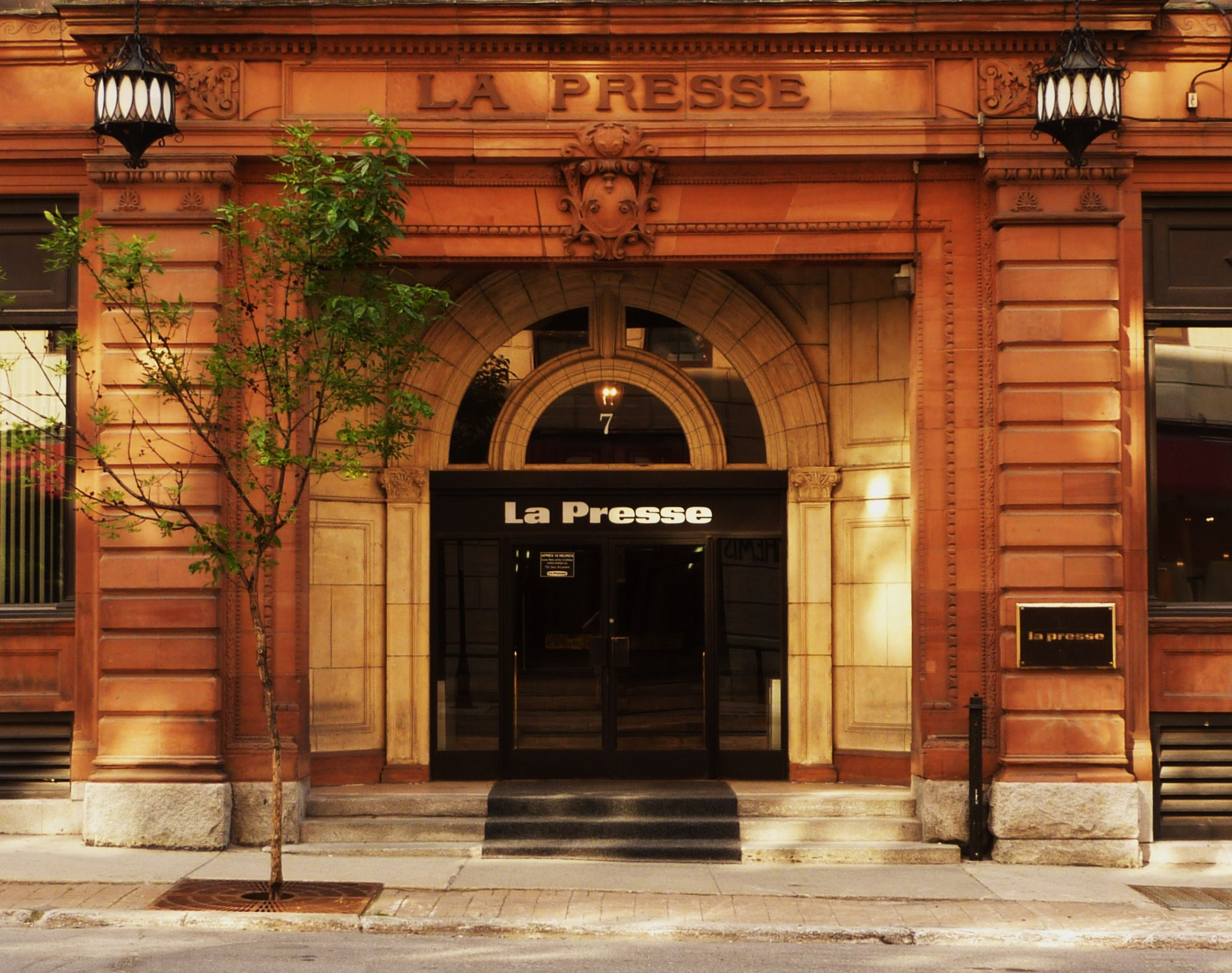
La Presse former office in Old Montreal. The building is now the Canadian head office of Mediterranean Shipping Company since 2019. The black plate to the right of the door shows the logo used from the 1960s until the mid-1980s. The logo over the door was used from the late 1980s until the 1990s.

The paper was founded on October 20, 1884 by William-Edmond Blumhart. Trefflé Berthiaume took over in 1889. The fledgling newspaper's circulation would soon pass that of its main competitor of the time, La Patrie.

In April 1901, the paper organized a cruise to Quebec City (Croisière de La Presse). It also organized a charity to give Christmas gifts to poor children (L'Oeuvre des étrennes aux enfants pauvres).

A front-page illustration on December 3, 1904, issue celebrated the 50th anniversary of the proclamation of the Roman Catholic dogma of the Immaculate Conception. The practice of the time was to have an illustration on the front page, rather than a photograph.

Between July 1971 and February 1972, La Presse endured a seven-month labour dispute between its then-owner Power Corporation of Canada and 11 trade unions, prompted by the introduction of new printing technology that could have jeopardized the jobs of newspaper typographers. This resulted in La Presse not being printed between October 28, 1971, and February 9, 1972. The dispute culminated in an over-10,000-strong protest in Downtown Montreal on October 29, 1971, resulting in over 200 injuries and arrests, as well as the death of the 28-year-old Michèle Gauthier, a student at Cégep du Vieux Montréal, who was caught up in the protests.

The style and presentation of the print newspaper changed immensely during the course of the 20th century. It underwent complete graphic redesigns in 1986 and 2003.

From 1984 to 2014, La Presse every year honoured a "Person of the Year", for example, Julie Payette, Daniel Langlois and Gaétan Boucher. In 1984, it also published a commemorative book in order to celebrate its 100th anniversary. A similar book was published by Éditions La Presse to recap the major events of the 20th century.

In 2001, with the arrival of news editor Guy Crevier, the newspaper began a radical remodelling. The graphic design was modernized, new sections were created, international coverage was greatly increased, and many new young, up-and-coming journalists were hired. These changes had a significant positive impact on quality and circulation, to the point that the paper is now considered a rival to Le Devoir for the title of Quebec's newspaper of record.

In 2011, La Presse rebranded its new-media operations from Cyberpresse.ca to LaPresse.ca. In 2013, the newspaper launched La Presse+, a free digital edition for iPad.

Founded in May 2015, Nuglif is a subsidiary of La Presse and the platform aims at replicating the La Presse+ business model for other publications in the daily news industry through a suite of publishing software and tools for delivery on both iPads and Android tablets.

The newspaper announced in September 2015 that it would end its weekday print edition in 2016 and that thereafter the weekday paper would be available only in digital form. The Saturday edition continued in print until December 30, 2017.

On May 8, 2018, it was announced that La Presse would become a non-profit organization and sever ties with its owner, Power Corporation. This move allowed the newspaper to accept private donations and governmental support.

== Editorial line ==
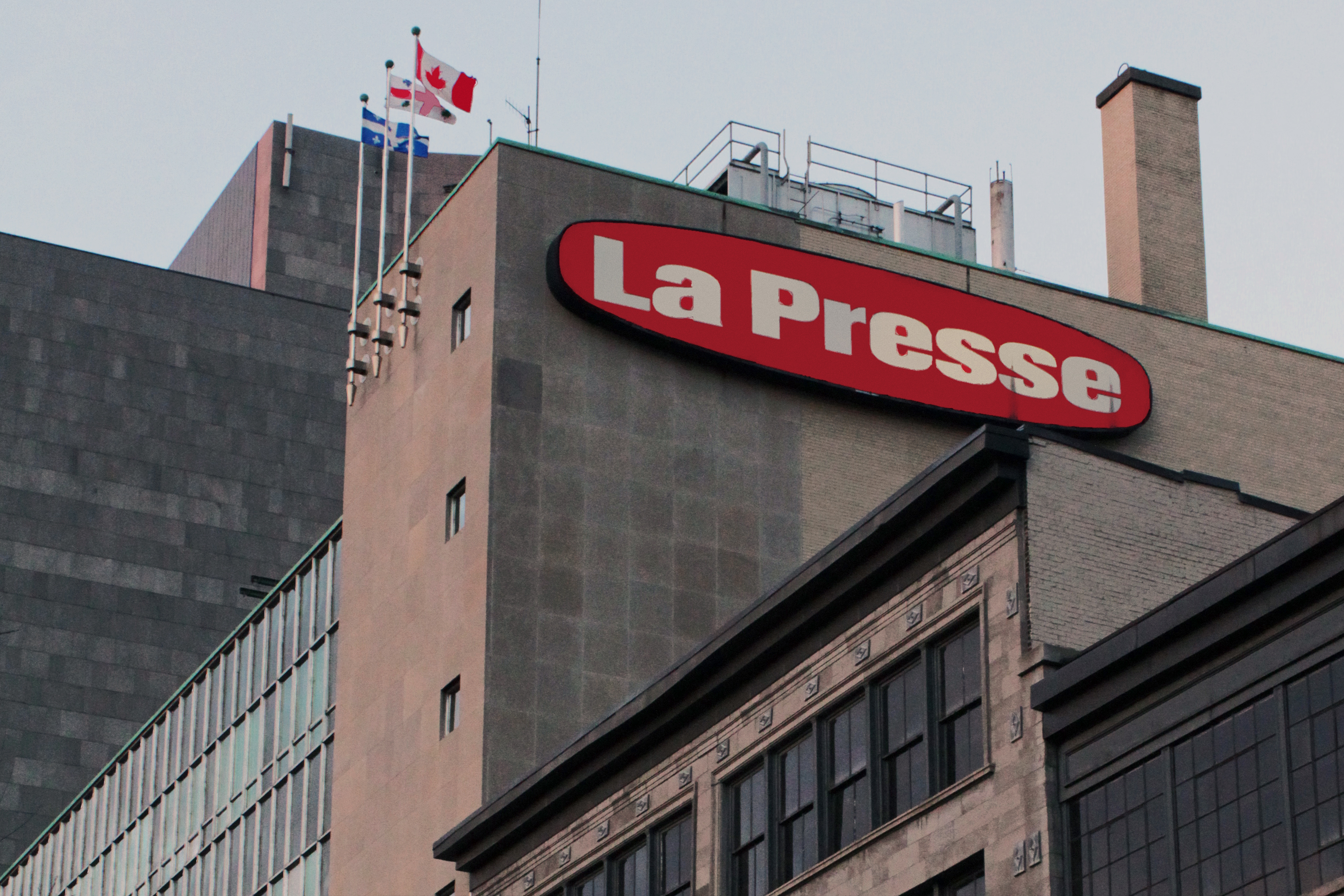
La Presse's offices in Old Montreal with 1986–1999 logo

The editorial board of La Presse has been consistently supportive of Canadian federalism over the past 25 years, though individual columnists may freely express less sympathy. The newspaper's editorials endorsed the federalist option in both the 1980 Quebec referendum and the 1995 Quebec referendum which were held on the issue of Quebec's national sovereignty.

The editorial board leaves room for the whole spectrum of opinions. It supported same-sex marriage legislation in Canada, the protests against the War in Iraq, and criticized both sides in the 2012 Quebec student protests. The paper endorsed the Conservative Party in the 2006 election. This was primarily out of a reasoning that the Canadian government was in need of a necessary change after more than 12 years of Liberal rule. Similarly, with Stephen Harper's Conservatives having been in power for nine years at the time, La Presse endorsed Justin Trudeau's Liberal Party in the 2015 election.

Guy Crevier is currently the editor, and François Cardinal is the assistant editor. Noted journalists associated with the paper include Patrick Lagacé, Yves Boisvert, Agnès Gruda and Lysiane Gagnon.

== Television ==
The newspaper's television production arm, La Presse Télé, has produced the series Dumont, hosted by former politician Mario Dumont, for the Quebec television network V (formerly TQS). The division, which had changed its name to LP8 Média, was sold to Attraction Images in 2014.

== Notable staff ==
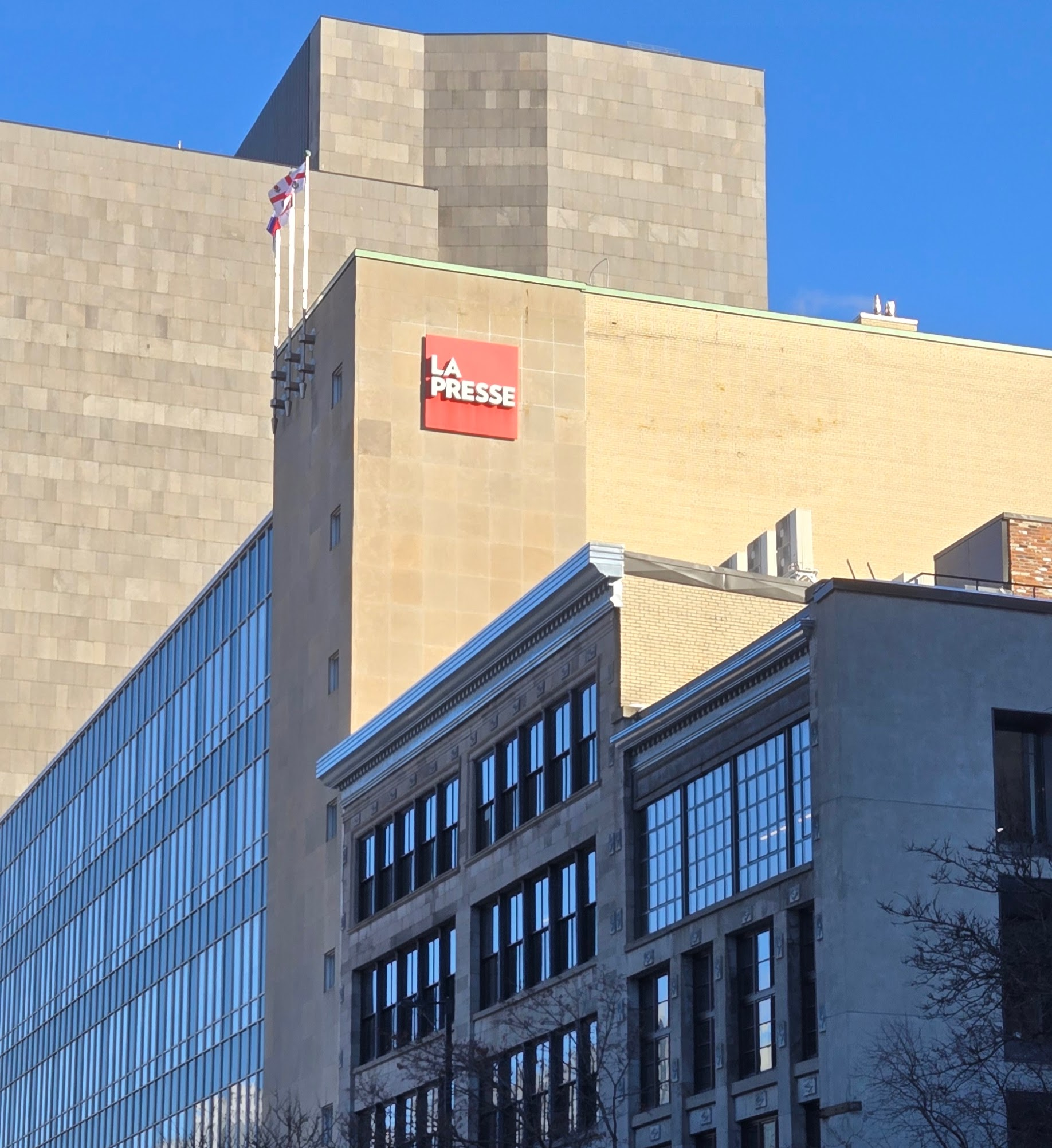
La Presse's offices in 2026

- Montague Birrell Black, front page illustrator
- Marcel Desjardins, vice-president, assistant editor and news director
- Rima Elkouri, columnist, novelist
- François Gagnon, ice hockey journalist covering the Montreal Canadiens

== See also ==
- List of Quebec media

Montreal newspapers:

- The Gazette
- Le Journal de Montréal
- Le Devoir
- Métro (defunct)
- Montreal Daily News (defunct)
- Montreal Star (defunct)
