= Érik Péladeau =

Canadian publisher

Érik Péladeau (born March 24, 1955) is the son of Canadian publisher Pierre Péladeau, and board member of Quebecor. In 1991 his father placed him at the head of Quebecor Communications, the newspaper and communication division of Quebecor. In 1999 he became CEO of that division.

In 2008 Péladeau left the board of directors of Quebecor World, but he retained his position in the board of directors at Quebecor Inc.
