= Changement Intégrité pour notre Québec =

Changement Intégrité pour notre Québec CINQ
- Leader: Eric Emond
- Founded: October 6, 2016
- Headquarters: Sainte-Marthe-sur-le-Lac, Quebec
- Ideology: Feminism; Anti-corruption; Social liberalism
- Political position: Centre to centre-left
- Colours: Purple
- Seats in the National Assembly: 0 / 125

Website
- http://cinqleparti.org/

Changement Intégrité pour notre Québec (French pronunciation: [ʃɑ̃ʒmɑ̃ ɛ̃teɡʁite puʁ nɔtʁ kebɛk], CINQ) is a minor political party in the Canadian province of Quebec founded in October 2016. Its stated mission includes working for equality between men and women, promoting transparency and democratic accountability, and "stopping the transfer of wealth from the middle to the 'upper' class". The party's proposals include efforts to counter corruption and political interference in the judiciary, and massive investments in education and healthcare.

The party was among several prevented from running candidates who wore hijabs by a Chief Electoral Officer of Quebec requirement to submit an official photo of each candidate with an uncovered head. In 2016, it ran Shirley Cedent and Eric Emond for deputy of Marie-Victorin and Saint-Jérôme respectively; they received 0.25% and 0.2% of the vote.

== Election results ==
General election	# of candidates	# of elected candidates	% of popular vote
2018	7	0	0.02%
