= Parti équitable =

Fair Party Parti équitable
- Leader: Patricia Domingos
- Founder: Yvan Rodrigue
- Founded: 2012
- Dissolved: 2019
- Merged into: Citoyens au pouvoir du Québec
- Headquarters: 810, montée Noire; Ste-Justine-de-Newton (Québec); J0P 1T0
- Colours: Green, Blue

Website
- www.partiequitable.org

The Parti équitable (French pronunciation: [paʁti ekitabl]) was a political party in the Canadian province of Quebec. It was founded shortly before the 2012 election, where its leader Yvan Rodrigue, ran in Lévis. Rodrigue stepped down as leader in 2013, and was replaced by Patricia Domingos. Domingos, a former candidate for leadership of the Green Party of Quebec and Mayor of Sainte-Justine-de-Newton ran in Soulanges in the 2014 election. The Party ceased to exist on January 1, 2019 as a result of its merger with the Party Citoyens au Pouvoir du Québec.

== Ideology ==
The party's ideology shifted between the two leaders. When the party was founded by Yvan Rodrigue, the party took more of a centre-right ideology, "advocating a "sound management of government spending" to alleviate Quebec's debt and reduce the tax burden". Additionally, Rodrigue proposed to "remove premiums in the public service, increase penalties for criminals, reduce debt and taxes, and impose a moratorium on shale gas". When Patricia Domingos took over the party in 2013, the party moved closer to the left of the political spectrum, shifting "to a political program based on ecology, sustainable development and social justice".

== Leadership ==
- Yvan Rodrigue: February 2012 - December 2013
- Patricia Domingos: December 2013 – January 2019

== Election results ==
General election	# of candidates	# of elected candidates	% of popular vote
2012	1	0	0.00%
2014	5	0	0.04%
2018	N/A (Note: The party didn't campaign this election)	0	0.00%
