= 2012 Montreal shooting =

Shooting at Quebec Premier post-election victory party

Coordinates: 45°30′39″N 73°33′48″W

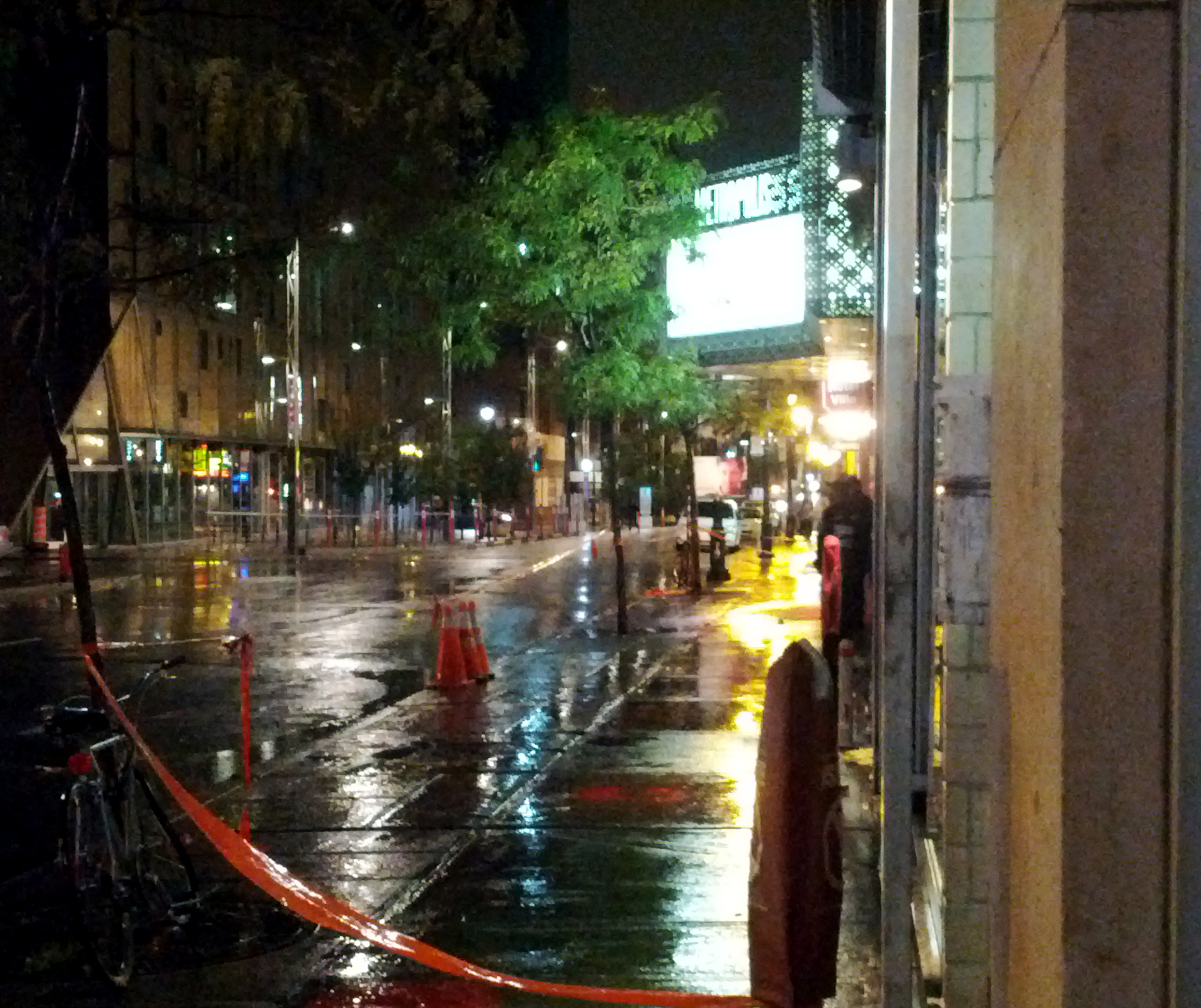
- Caution tape and policemen at Saint Catherine Street in front of the Métropolis building, after the shooting
- Location: Montreal, Quebec, Canada
- Date: September 4, 2012 (UTC-4)
- Target: Separatists
- Attack type: Shooting, arson
- Weapons: CZ-858 semi-automatic rifle; 9mm CZ 75 semi-automatic pistol
- Deaths: 1
- Injuries: 1
- Perpetrator: Richard Henry Bain
- Motive: Opposition to the Quebec sovereignty movement

On the night of September 4, 2012, the Parti Québécois won the Quebec general election, with a minority government. Party leader Pauline Marois was partway through her victory speech at the Métropolis in the downtown of Montreal, Quebec, Canada, when Richard Henry Bain, in an attempt to assassinate her and "kill as many separatists as possible", approached the building and opened fire with a semi-automatic rifle, killing one stage technician and severely injuring another. After his rifle jammed, Bain lit a fire in the back of the building and was quickly tackled and apprehended by Montreal police. In 2016, Bain was convicted of second-degree murder along with three counts of attempted murder and was sentenced to twenty years in prison.

== Details ==
Bain, wearing a blue bathrobe and black balaclava approached the back door of the Métropolis theatre with a 9mm CZ 75 semi-automatic pistol and a Česká Zbrojovka-858 semiautomatic rifle. Initial eyewitness reports claimed the rifle was an AK-47 assault rifle, which is similar in appearance to the semiautomatic CZ-858. Bain opened fire, killing Denis Blanchette, a 48-year-old male stage technician. His 27-year-old colleague, Dave Courage, was critically wounded.

Marois was whisked away from the stage without harm by her bodyguards, and the suspect was apprehended and arrested, shortly after he had started a fire at the back entrance of the building. While being led to the police vehicle during his arrest, the suspect called out "The English are waking up!" and "It's going to be fucking payback." Although in 2012 it was reported the shooter used a Molotov cocktail, it was later alleged Bain poured gasoline on a door and ignited it with a road flare. Several families living in the area had to be evacuated out of their homes due to the fire, which was quickly doused. The Sûreté du Québec announced that the shooting would be investigated as a potential attempted assassination on Marois, the then-premier-designate.

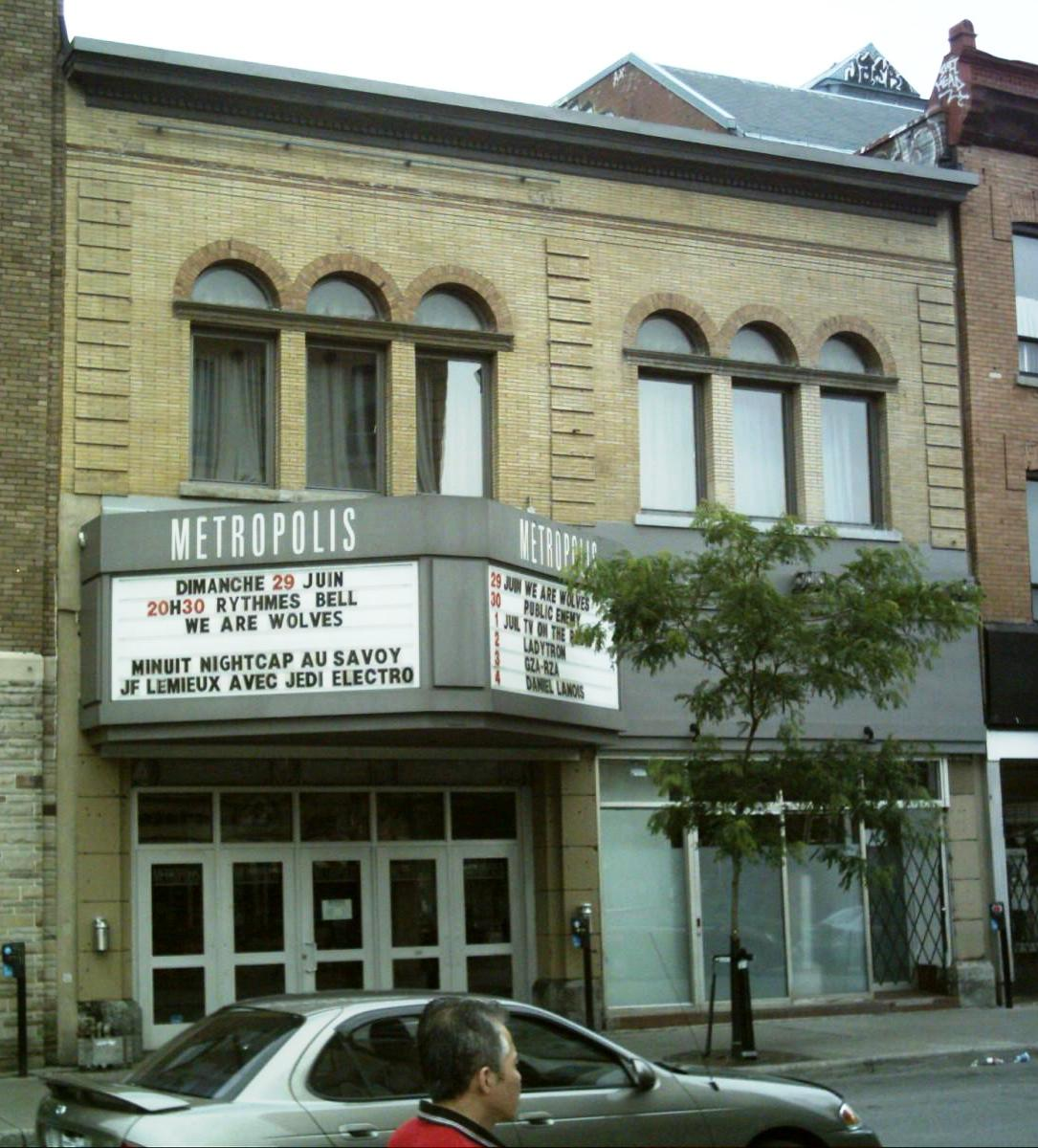
The Métropolis, the site of the attack

== Perpetrator ==
Richard Henry Bain (born September 8, 1950) is an evangelical Baptist from La Conception, Laurentides, Quebec. Police searched Bain's vehicle and found a 9mm Beretta pistol, a .357 Magnum revolver, a .22-calibre semi-automatic rifle, lighter fluid and gas canisters that could have been used for the fire.

=== Legal proceedings ===
Bain faced 16 charges, including one first-degree murder and three attempted murders; the remnant charges are related to arson and weapons violations. In several of the multiple court hearings, Bain claimed that Jesus Christ is his lawyer. After losing his legal aid lawyer, he looked for a new lawyer and read up on the criminal code to represent himself. He had a preliminary hearing scheduled on March 12, 2013.

With Alan Guttman as his new defence lawyer, Bain's trial was delayed to May 2016 while Guttman sought an expert to perform another psychiatric evaluation of Bain. Guttman claimed that Bain was on anti-depressants with side effects on personality and hallucinations.

During the trial, Guttman argued the defendant was not criminally responsible. However, forensic psychiatrist Dr. Joel Watts, called by the Crown, testified Bain understood his actions were wrong. In their closing arguments, the prosecution cited handwritten answers Bain provided to psychiatrist Marie-Frédérique Allard, who had previously testified for the defense, which stated "If my rifle had not jammed I would have killed other people" and "if Madame Marois could be seen, I would have killed her."

On August 23, 2016, Bain was found guilty of second-degree murder and three counts of attempted murder. Sentencing arguments were heard in September 2016. On November 18, 2016, Bain was sentenced to life imprisonment without eligibility for parole until he has served 20 years of that sentence. In October 2019, the Supreme Court of Canada refused to hear his appeal.

== Official reaction ==
Canadian Prime Minister Stephen Harper stated that he was 'shocked and saddened' by the shooting, and that "such violence has no place in Canada". At a party caucus meeting in St. John's, Newfoundland and Labrador, New Democratic Party leader Tom Mulcair issued the following statement: "Our first thoughts are with the victims and their families and those that were close to them. We're going to continue to let the police do their work before commenting any further on these tragic events." On September 6, it was reported that Denis Blanchette would be given a civic funeral. The funeral was held on September 10, with Marois and former premier Bernard Landry among the dignitaries in attendance. Équipe Spectra also organized a benefit concert in memory of Blanchette, with funds to support Blanchette's four-year-old daughter.
