= 2012 Quebec general election =

Canadian provincial election

- September 4, 2012

125 seats in the National Assembly of Quebec 63 seats needed for a majority
- Opinion polls
- Turnout: 74.60% (▲17.17%)
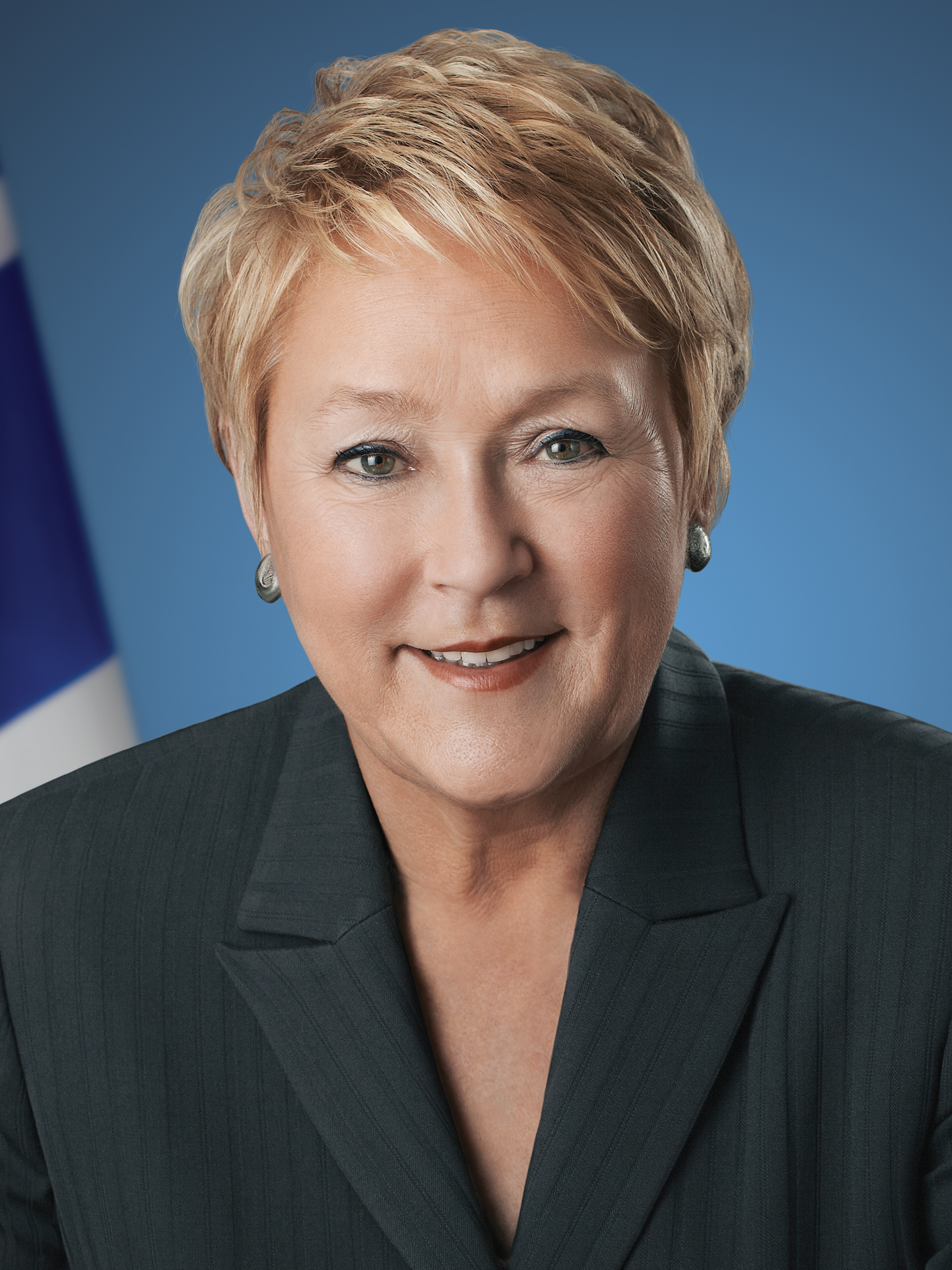

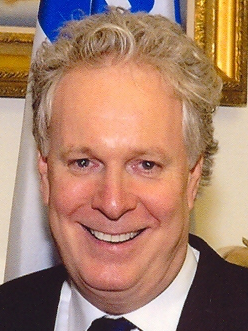

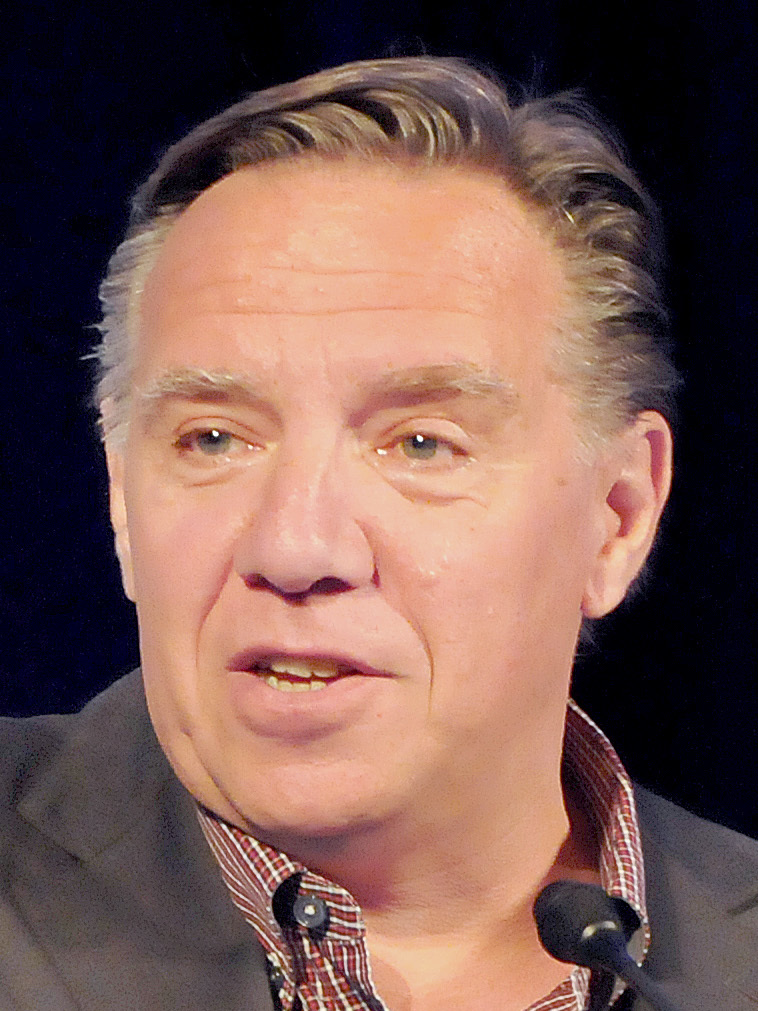

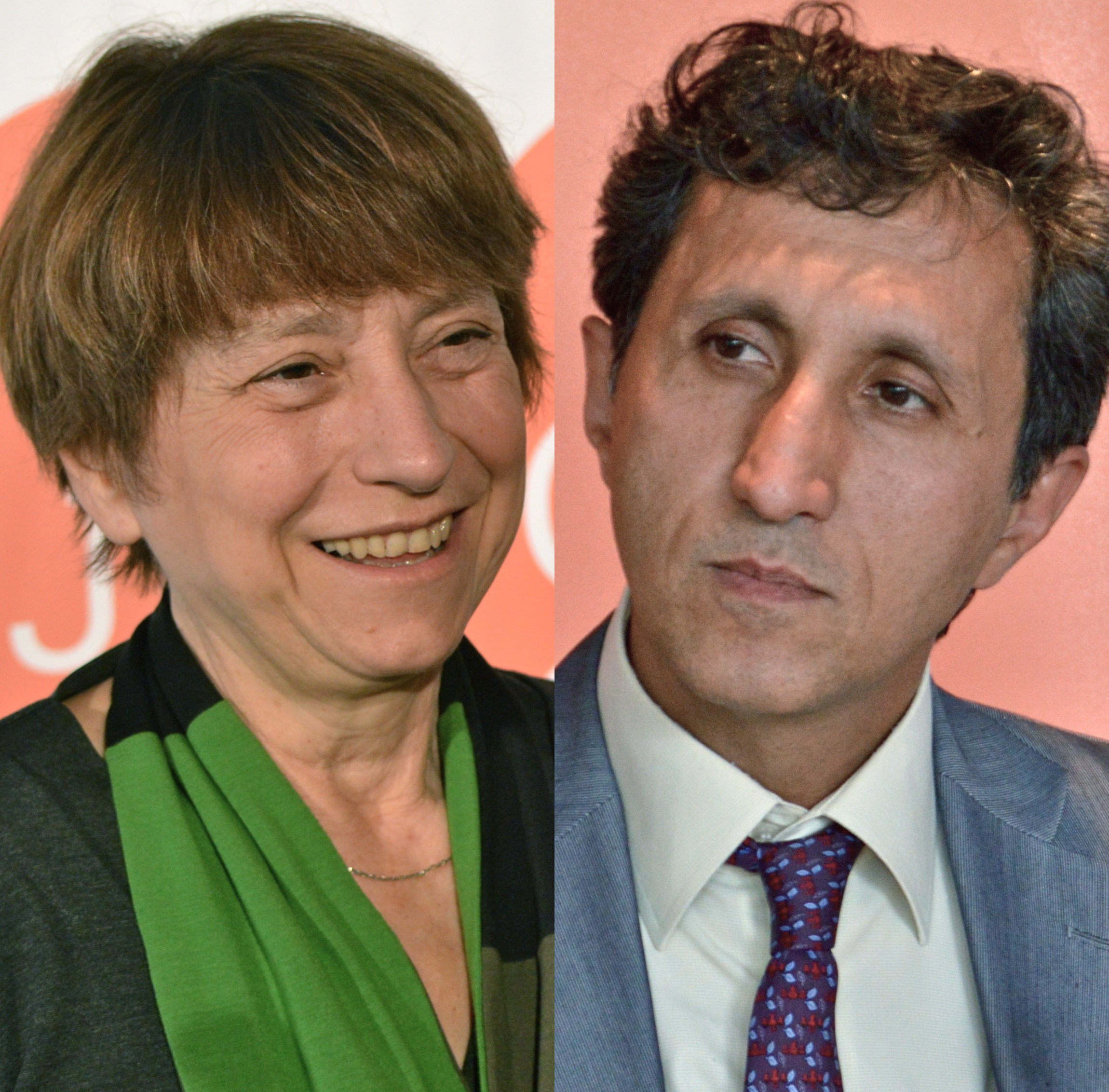
	First party	Second party
Leader	Pauline Marois	Jean Charest
Party	Parti Québécois	Liberal
Leader since	June 26, 2007	April 30, 1998
Leader's seat	Charlevoix–Côte-de-Beaupré	Sherbrooke (lost re-election)
Last election	51 seats, 35.17%	66 seats, 42.08%
Seats before	47	64
Seats won	54	50
Seat change	▲7	▼14
Popular vote	1,393,703	1,360,968
Percentage	31.95%	31.20%
Swing	▼3.22pp	▼10.88pp
	Third party	Fourth party
Leader	François Legault	Françoise David & Amir Khadir (as spokespeople)
Party	Coalition Avenir Québec	Québec solidaire
Leader since	November 4, 2011	February 4, 2006
Leader's seat	L'Assomption (won seat)	David: Gouin; Khadir: Mercier
Last election	7 seats, 16.37%^{1}	1 seat, 3.78%
Seats before	9	1
Seats won	19	2
Seat change	▲10	▲1
Popular vote	1,180,235	263,111
Percentage	27.05%	6.03%
Swing	▲10.68pp^{1}	▲2.25pp
- Popular vote by riding. As this is an FPTP election, seat totals are not determined by popular vote, but instead via results by each riding. Click the map for more details.
Premier before election
Jean Charest
Liberal
Premier after election
Pauline Marois
Parti Québécois

Seating plan following the election.

The 2012 Quebec general election took place in the Canadian province of Quebec on September 4, 2012. Lieutenant Governor Pierre Duchesne dissolved the National Assembly on August 1, 2012, following Premier Jean Charest's request. The Parti Québécois were elected to a minority government, with Pauline Marois becoming the first woman to be Premier of Quebec. The Quebec Liberal Party took second place, with Premier Jean Charest losing his seat. The newly-formed Coalition Avenir Québec, led by François Legault, took third place, while Québec solidaire took 2 seats out of the 125.

During Marois' victory speech, an attack including gunshots and a fire occurred at the Métropolis concert hall housing the event and a forty-year-old man died as a result of gunshot wounds.

This was the last time the Parti Québécois won government until 2026.

== Timeline ==
=== 2008 ===
- December 8 – 39th Quebec general election
- December 15 – Pauline Marois becomes the leader of the Official Opposition.
- December 18 – Swearing in of the Cabinet members

=== 2009 ===
- January 13 – Yvon Vallières is elected President of the National Assembly.
- January 14 – An economic statement is pronounced by Monique Jérôme-Forget.
- March 6 – Resignation of Mario Dumont (ADQ) as MNA of Rivière-du-Loup
- March 10 – The opening speech of the 39th Quebec Legislature is pronounced by Premier Jean Charest.
- March 25 — The Conservative Party of Quebec is registered.
- April 8 – Resignation of Monique Jérôme-Forget (Lib) as MNA of Marguerite-Bourgeoys
- April 9 — The Parti nul is registered.
- June 22 – In two by-elections, Jean D'Amour (Lib) and Clément Gignac (Lib) are elected MNAs of Rivière-du-Loup and Marguerite-Bourgeoys respectively.
- June 25 – Resignation of François Legault (PQ) as MNA of Rousseau
- September 21 – In a by-election, Nicolas Marceau (PQ) is elected MNA of Rousseau with 57% of the vote.
- October 18 – Gilles Taillon is elected as leader of the Action démocratique du Québec (ADQ).
- November 6 – Éric Caire and Marc Picard leave the ADQ to sit as independents.
- November 10 – Gilles Taillon resigns his post as ADQ leader amid Caire and Picard's defections. Taillon also called for a police investigation into the “troubling” funding practices in the party."
- November 19 – Gérard Deltell replaces Taillon as leader of ADQ.

=== 2010 ===
- January 6 – Resignation of Camil Bouchard (PQ) as MNA of Vachon
- May 6 – Tony Tomassi is kicked out of the Liberal cabinet and caucus after it is revealed he was given a gasoline credit card by a private security firm.
- July 5 – In a by-election, Martine Ouellet (PQ) is elected MNA of Vachon with 59% of the vote.
- August 9 – Resignation of Jacques Dupuis (Lib) as MNA of Saint-Laurent
- September 7 – Resignation of Claude Béchard as MNA of Kamouraska-Témiscouata (Lib), he dies from cancer later that day
- September 13 – In a by-election, Jean-Marc Fournier (Lib) is elected MNA of Saint-Laurent with 64% of the vote.
- November 29 – In a by-election, André Simard (PQ) is elected MNA of Kamouraska-Témiscouata with 37% of the vote.

=== 2011 ===
- March 7 — A party named "Québec - Révolution démocratique" is registered.
- June 6 – Louise Beaudoin, Pierre Curzi, and Lisette Lapointe leave the Parti Québécois to sit as independents.
- June 7 – Jean-Martin Aussant leaves the Parti Québécois to sit as an independent.
- June 21 – Benoit Charette leaves the Parti Québécois to sit as an independent and René Gauvreau is asked to leave the Parti Québécois pending an investigation of his former aide.
- September 6 – Resignation of Nathalie Normandeau (Lib) as MNA of Bonaventure
- September 19 – Jean-Martin Aussant (Ind, ex-PQ) announces his intention to register a new sovereigntist political party, Option nationale.
- November 4 – Coalition Avenir Québec, a new party led by François Legault, is officially registered.
- November 17 – Lisette Lapointe buys an Option nationale membership, but remains sitting as an independent.
- November 24 – Daniel Ratthé is expelled from the PQ caucus.
- December 5 – In a by-election, Damien Arsenault (Lib) is elected MNA of Bonaventure with 49.5% of the vote.
- December 14 – The Coalition Avenir Québec and the ADQ announced an agreement in principle to merge, pending final approval from the ADQ membership.
- December 16 – Resignation of David Whissell (Lib) as MNA of Argenteuil
- December 19 – Éric Caire (Ind, ex-ADQ), Benoit Charette (Ind, ex-PQ), Marc Picard (Ind, ex-ADQ), and Daniel Ratthé (Ind, ex-PQ) join the Coalition Avenir Québec.

=== 2012 ===
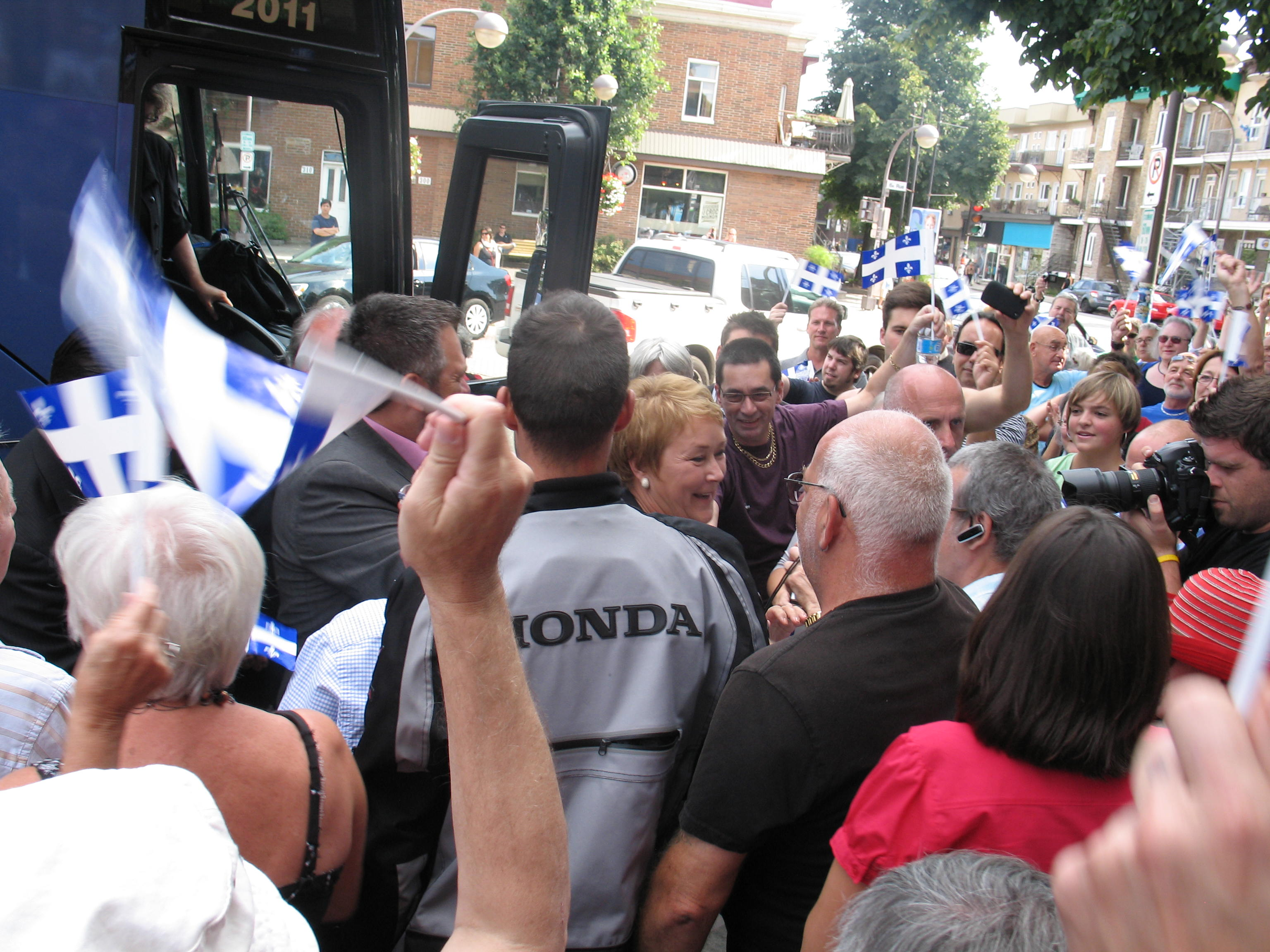
Pauline Marois on the campaign trail.

- January 9 – François Rebello (PQ) joins the Coalition Avenir Québec.
- January 22 – The ADQ membership approves a merger with the Coalition Avenir Québec, resulting in ADQ MNA's Sylvie Roy, Janvier Grondin, François Bonnardel and leader Gérard Deltell becoming CAQ members.
- February 14 — The Coalition Avenir Québec is registered.
- February 25 – Founding convention of Option nationale.
- March 4 – Independent Lisette Lapointe announces that she will not run in the next election.
- March 21 — The Équipe autonomiste is registered.
- April 3 - Louise Beaudoin (Ind) rejoins the Parti Québécois.
- April 5 - René Gauvreau (Ind) is re-admitted into the Parti Québécois.
- May 3 - Resignation of Tony Tomassi (Ind) as MNA of LaFontaine
- May 8 — The Middle Class Party of Quebec is registered.
- May 14 - Resignation of Line Beauchamp (Lib) as MNA of Bourassa-Sauvé
- June 11 - In by-elections, Marc Tanguay (Lib) is elected MNA of LaFontaine with 53% of the vote, and Roland Richer (PQ) is elected MNA of Argenteuil with 36% of the vote.
- June 13 — The Coalition pour la constituante is registered.
- June 29 — The Parti démocratie chrétienne du Québec is renamed to Parti unité nationale.
- July 11 — Documents from the Quebec Liberal Party and the Government suggest that a general election will be called on August 1 and take place on Tuesday, September 4.
- July 13 — The Quebec Citizens' Union is registered.
- August 1 - Lieutenant Governor Pierre Duchesne dissolves the National Assembly, on Premier Jean Charest's request, and calls an election for September 4, 2012.
- September 4 - The election takes place.
  - Pauline Marois's victory speech is disrupted by the 2012 Montreal shooting.

== Redistribution of ridings ==
The Commission de la représentation électorale performed a redistribution in 2011, which maintained the number of seats in the National Assembly at 125 for the next general election, making the following alterations:

Abolished ridings	New ridings
Renaming of districts
Anjou	Anjou–Louis-Riel
Charlevoix	Charlevoix–Côte-de-Beaupré
Drummond	Drummond–Bois-Francs
Marguerite-D'Youville	Montarville
Mégantic-Compton	Mégantic
Montmagny-L'Islet	Côte-du-Sud
Nicolet-Yamaska	Nicolet-Bécancour
Prévost	Saint-Jérôme
Shefford	Granby
Vanier	Vanier-Les Rivières
Drawn from other districts
	Repentigny (Note: Part from L'Assomption.)
	Sainte-Rose (Note: Parts from Fabre and Vimont.)
	Sanguinet (Note: Parts from Châteauguay, La Prairie and Huntingdon.)
Merger of districts
Lotbinière; Frontenac	Lotbinière-Frontenac
Matane; Matapédia	Matane-Matapédia
Rivière-du-Loup; Kamouraska-Témiscouata	Rivière-du-Loup–Témiscouata

== Incumbent MNAs who did not run for re-election ==
Liberal
- Vincent Auclair, Vimont
- Daniel Bernard, Rouyn-Noranda–Témiscamingue
- Michelle Courchesne, Fabre
- Monique Gagnon-Tremblay, Saint-François
- Johanne Gonthier, Mégantic-Compton
- Norman MacMillan, Papineau
- Yvon Vallières, Richmond
Parti Québécois
- Louise Beaudoin, Rosemont
- Danielle Doyer, Matapédia
- René Gauvreau, Groulx
- Martin Lemay, Sainte-Marie–Saint-Jacques
- Claude Pinard, Saint-Maurice
- Sylvain Simard, Richelieu
- Guillaume Tremblay, Masson

Coalition Avenir Québec

- Janvier Grondin, Beauce-Nord

Independent

- Pierre Curzi, Borduas
- Lisette Lapointe, Crémazie

== Opinion polls ==
Evolution of voting intentions for the 2012 Quebec general election. Dots are individual poll results and trend lines are local regressions with 95% confidence interval.

Polling firm	Last date of polling	Link	QLP	PQ	CAQ	QS	ON	GPQ	Other
2012 Election	September 4, 2012	HTML	31.20	31.95	27.05	6.03	1.89	0.99	0.89
Forum Research	September 3, 2012	PDF	29	36	25	6	2	2	0
EKOS	September 2, 2012	PDF	23.2	36.0	24.5	10.7			5.5
Léger Marketing	August 31, 2012	PDF	27	33	28	7	3	1	1
CROP	August 29, 2012	HTML	26	32	28	9	2	2	1
Forum Research	August 28, 2012	PDF	28	33	27	8	2	2	0
CROP	August 26, 2012	HTML	26	33	28	7	3	3	1
Léger Marketing	August 24, 2012	PDF	27	33	28	7	2	2	1
Forum Research	August 20, 2012	PDF	35	29	24	9	1	2	0
Léger Marketing	August 16, 2012	PDF	28	33	27	6	3	2	0
CROP	August 14, 2012	HTML	27	34	25	7	2	3	1
Forum Research	August 13, 2012	PDF	31	35	25	6		2	0
Léger Marketing	August 8, 2012	PDF	31	32	27	6	2	2	0
CROP	August 8, 2012	HTML	29	32	21	8	2	3	4
Forum Research	August 7, 2012	PDF	32	34	24	6		3	0
Forum Research	August 1, 2012	PDF	38	39	14	4		3	0
Léger Marketing	July 31, 2012	PDF	31	33	21	7	2	4	2
2008 Election	December 8, 2008	HTML	42.08	35.17	—	3.78	—	2.17	16.80

Opinion polling from 2008 to June 2012
Polling firm	Last date of polling	Link	QLP	PQ	CAQ (Note: Polls prior to November 2011 were listed as "New Party led by François Legault".)	QS	ON	GPQ	ADQ	Other
Léger Marketing	June 14, 2012	PDF	33	32	19	9	1	4		2
CROP	May 25, 2012	PDF	31	30	22	9	2	5		2
Léger Marketing	May 21, 2012	PDF	32	32	21	10	1	4		0
Forum Research	May 17, 2012	PDF	34	33	18	10		4		0
Segma Recherche	May 17, 2012	PDF	28	32	19	11		9		1
Forum Research	May 15, 2012	PDF	35	33	19	10		3		0
CROP	May 3, 2012	HTML	31	25	24	8	2	8		2
Léger Marketing	May 2, 2012	PDF	28	31	24	9	2	4		2
Forum Research	April 23, 2012	PDF	35	35	16	8		6		0
CROP	April 23, 2012	PDF	30	28	25	8	1	7		1
Forum Research	April 10, 2012	PDF	34	39	18	6		4		0
Léger Marketing	April 4, 2012	PDF	27	33	22	7	1	5		5
Forum Research	March 21, 2012	HTML	29	41	19	8		4		0
CROP	March 19, 2012	PDF	30	34	24	5	1	5		
Léger Marketing	March 7, 2012	PDF	28	33	24	6	2	4		3
Forum Research	February 23, 2012	HTML	30	39	19	6		5		0
CROP	February 21, 2012	HTML	29	30	26	8	2	3		1
Léger Marketing	February 12, 2012	PDF	29	29	28	8		4		2
Léger Marketing	January 25, 2012	PDF	26	25	32	9		6		2
CROP	January 23, 2012	PDF	29	21	31	11	2	5		1
Léger Marketing	January 12, 2012	PDF	27	25	33	9		3		3
CROP	December 14, 2011	PDF	28	18	39	9		5		1
Léger Marketing	December 14, 2011	PDF	22	24	37	9		5		3
CROP	November 23, 2011	JPG	25	21	42	7		4		1
CROP	November 23, 2011	PDF	27	19	33	6		5	6	3
Léger Marketing	November 17, 2011	PDF	22	21	35	8		3	8	3
Léger Marketing	October 27, 2011	PDF	22	20	35*	8		5	8	2
CROP	October 17, 2011	PDF	28	25		13		5	20	9
Léger Marketing	October 12, 2011	PDF	22	18	36*	7		5	9	3
Léger Marketing	October 12, 2011	PDF	26	25		11		6	18	14
CROP	September 19, 2011	PDF	28	28		11		7	18	9
Léger Marketing	September 15, 2011	PDF	25	17	34*	7		6	9	2
Léger Marketing	September 15, 2011	PDF	31	26		9		5	16	13
CROP	August 22, 2011	PDF	33	27		11		5	16	9
Léger Marketing	August 20, 2011	PDF	34	24		12		5	14	11
CROP	June 20, 2011	PDF	35	29		7		7	17	5
Léger Marketing	June 8, 2011	PDF	30	30		11		6	17	6
CROP	June 7, 2011	HTML	27	26		17		9	15	7
CROP	May 16, 2011	PDF	23	34		12		11	16	5
Léger Marketing	May 11, 2011	PDF	30	34		9		4	18	5
Léger Marketing	April 14, 2011	PDF	31	38		9		5	14	3
Léger Marketing	March 10, 2011	PDF	27	37		11		5	13	7
Léger Marketing	February 10, 2011	PDF	28	34		9		7	15	7
CROP	September 27, 2010	HTML	31	40		9		7	13	
Angus Reid Public Opinion	September 26, 2010	PDF	26	40		10		8	11	5
Léger Marketing	September 16, 2010	PDF	32	40		11		6	10	2
Léger Marketing	August 19, 2010	PDF	31	41		9		7	9	3
Angus Reid Public Opinion	August 12, 2010	PDF	31	39		8		8	12	3
Léger Marketing	June 11, 2010	PDF	30	41		8		5	13	2
Léger Marketing	May 6, 2010	PDF	31	40		8		7	12	1
Angus Reid Public Opinion	April 14, 2010	PDF	23	41		9		10	13	5
Léger Marketing	April 8, 2010	PDF	30	40		9		8	10	2
Léger Marketing	March 12, 2010	PDF	32	38		10		7	10	
Léger Marketing	February 11, 2010	PDF	37	40		6		6	9	
CROP	January 24, 2010	HTML	40	38		8		8	6	
Léger Marketing	January 15, 2010	PDF	39	41		7		5	6	
Léger Marketing	November 30, 2009	PDF	37	41		7		7	8	
CROP	October 28, 2009	HTML	39	40		6		6	8	
Léger Marketing	September 9, 2009	PDF	41	37		6		5	10	
Environics	June 2009	HTML	45	38		4		1	11	
Léger Marketing	May 25, 2009	PDF	40	40		5		5	8	1
Environics	April 2009	HTML	34	50		2		1	13	
Environics	December 2008	HTML	36	40		8		1	14	
2008 Election	December 8, 2008	HTML	42.08	35.17	—	3.78	—	2.17	16.37	0.43

=== By Language ===
==== French ====
Voting intentions among French speakers

Timeline of opinion polls
Polling organisation	Last date of polling	Source	Sample size	MoE	PQ	PLQ	CAQ	QS	Other	Lead
Léger	August 31, 2012	PDF			38	18	31	7	6 (Note: 1 for Green Party of Quebec, 4 for Option nationale)	7
Forum	August 28, 2012	PDF			35	26	28	8	4 (Note: 2 for Green Party of Quebec, 2 for Option nationale)	7
CROP	August 26, 2012	PDF			36	19	30	7	7 (Note: 3 for Green Party of Quebec, 3 for Option nationale)	6
Leger	August 24, 2012	PDF			38	18	31	8	4 (Note: 1 for Green Party of Quebec, 3 for Option nationale)	7
Leger	August 16, 2012	PDF			40	19	29	6	7 (Note: 1 for Green Party of Quebec, 4 for Option nationale)	11
CROP	August 14, 2012	PDF			39	21	26	7	8 (Note: 4 for Green Party of Quebec, 2 for Option nationale)	13
CROP	August 8, 2012	PDF			38	22	25	8	8 (Note: 3 for Green Party of Quebec, 2 for Option nationale)	13
Leger	August 8, 2012	PDF			39	18	31	7	4 (Note: 2 for Green Party of Quebec, 2 for Option nationale)	8
Forum	August 7, 2012	PDF			39	26	27	6	2 (Note: 2 for Green Party of Quebec)	12
Forum	August 1, 2012	PDF			43	32	16	5	3 (Note: 3 for Green Party of Quebec)	11
Leger	July 31, 2012	PDF			39	24	24	7	7 (Note: 3 for Green Party of Quebec, 3 for Option nationale)	15
CROP	July 25, 2012	PDF			36	22	28			
Leger	June 14, 2012	PDF			38	27	20	10	5 (Note: 3 for Green Party of Quebec, 1 for Option nationale)	
CROP	May 25, 2012	PDF			36	23	26	9	6 (Note: 3 for Green Party of Quebec, 2 for Option nationale)	
Leger	May 21, 2012	PDF			39	25	24	10	4 (Note: 3 for Green Party of Quebec, 1 for Option nationale)	
Segma	May 17, 2012	PDF			36	21	21	12	11 (Note: 10 for Green Party of Quebec)	
Leger	May 2 , 2012	PDF			37	22	26	9	6 (Note: 2 for Green Party of Quebec, 2 for Option nationale)	
Forum	24 April 2012	PDF			39	30	18	8	5 (Note: 5 for Green Party of Quebec)	
CROP	April 23, 2012	PDF			32	22	29	8	9 (Note: 7 for Green Party of Quebec, 1 for Option nationale)	
Leger	March 7, 2012	PDF			40	20	26	7	7 (Note: 4 for Green Party of Quebec, 2 for Option nationale)	
CROP	February 21, 2012	PDF			36	18	31	9	6 (Note: 2 for Green Party of Quebec, 3 for Option nationale)	
Leger	January 12, 2012	PDF			31	17	38	10	4 (Note: 2 for Green Party of Quebec)	
Leger	December 14, 2011	PDF			28	16	42	10	4 (Note: 3 for Green Party of Quebec)	
Leger	November 17, 2011	PDF			24	14	40	10	12 (Note: 2 for Green Party of Quebec, 9 for Action démocratique du Québec)	
Leger	October 27, 2011	PDF			22	15	40	9	14 (Note: 3 for Green Party of Quebec, 8 for Action démocratique du Québec)	
Leger	October 12, 2011	PDF			30	19		11	44 (Note: 6 for Green Party of Quebec, 21 for Action démocratique du Québec)	
Leger	September 15, 2011	PDF			30	25		10	35 (Note: 4 for Green Party of Quebec, 17 for Action démocratique du Québec)	
CROP	June 20 , 2011	PDF			34	27		8	31 (Note: 7 for Green Party of Quebec, 19 for Action démocratique du Québec)	
Leger	June 8, 2011	PDF			37	21		13	29 (Note: 6 for Green Party of Quebec, 18 for Action démocratique du Québec)	
CROP	April 20, 2011	PDF			48	20		13	20 (Note: 3 for Green Party of Quebec, 13 for Action démocratique du Québec)	
Leger	April 14, 2011	PDF			46	20		11	23 (Note: 4 for Green Party of Quebec, 16 for Action démocratique du Québec)	
Leger	March 10, 2011	PDF			42	20		13	25 (Note: 4 for Green Party of Quebec, 15 for Action démocratique du Québec)	
Leger	February 10, 2011	PDF			40	20		11	29 (Note: 5 for Green Party of Quebec, 17 for Action démocratique du Québec)	
CROP	November 22, 2010	PDF			45	17		14	6 (Note: 6 for Green Party of Quebec)	
CROP	September 27, 2010	PDF			45	25		10	21 (Note: 5 for Green Party of Quebec, 15 for Action démocratique du Québec)	
Leger	September 16, 2010	PDF			48	24		12	17 (Note: 5 for Green Party of Quebec, 11 for Action démocratique du Québec)	
Leger	August 19, 2010	PDF			51	21		10	18 (Note: 5 for Green Party of Quebec, 11 for Action démocratique du Québec)	
Leger	June 10, 2010	PDF			49	23		9	20 (Note: 4 for Green Party of Quebec, 14 for Action démocratique du Québec)	
Leger	March 11, 2010	PDF			45	25		10	19 (Note: 7 for Green Party of Quebec, 11 for Action démocratique du Québec)	
Leger	February 11, 2010	PDF			48	29		7	16 (Note: 6 for Green Party of Quebec, 9 for Action démocratique du Québec)	
CROP	24 January 2010	PDF			45	33		9	14 (Note: 7 for Green Party of Quebec, 7 for Action démocratique du Québec)	
Leger	14 January 2010	PDF			50	30		8	12 (Note: 4 for Green Party of Quebec, 7 for Action démocratique du Québec)	
Leger	November 26, 2009	PDF			47	29		8	16 (Note: 6 for Green Party of Quebec, 9 for Action démocratique du Québec)	
CROP	October 25, 2009	PDF			46	33		7	14 (Note: 5 for Green Party of Quebec, 9 for Action démocratique du Québec)	
CROP	27 September 2009	PDF			41	37		7	15 (Note: 7 for Green Party of Quebec, 8 for Action démocratique du Québec)	
Leger	September 2 , 2009	PDF			45	33		6	16 (Note: 5 for Green Party of Quebec, 10 for Action démocratique du Québec)	
CROP	August 23, 2009	PDF			39	37		9	15 (Note: 6 for Green Party of Quebec, 9 for Action démocratique du Québec)	
CROP	18 June 2009	PDF			43	33		7	17 (Note: 6 for Green Party of Quebec, 11 for Action démocratique du Québec)	
CROP	May 24, 2009	PDF			45	29		8	17 (Note: 7 for Green Party of Quebec, 10 for Action démocratique du Québec)	
Leger	May 17, 2009	PDF			48	31		6	14 (Note: 4 for Green Party of Quebec, 9 for Action démocratique du Québec)	
CROP	April 26, 2009	PDF			46	31		6	16 (Note: 7 for Green Party of Quebec, 9 for Action démocratique du Québec)	
CROP	March 23, 2009	PDF			48	27		8	17 (Note: 5 for Green Party of Quebec, 11 for Action démocratique du Québec)	
Leger	March 5, 2009	PDF			48	31		6	16 (Note: 6 for Green Party of Quebec, 10 for Action démocratique du Québec)	
Leger	February 25, 2009	PDF			50	28		5	16 (Note: 4 for Green Party of Quebec, 11 for Action démocratique du Québec)	
CROP	25 January 2009	PDF			39	34		8	20 (Note: 5 for Green Party of Quebec, 14 for Action démocratique du Québec)	

==== Non French ====
Voting intentions among non-French speakers

Timeline of opinion polls
Polling organisation	Last date of polling	Source	Sample size	MoE	PQ	PLQ	CAQ	QS	Other	Lead
Leger	August 31, 2012	PDF			10	61	18	5	6 (Note: 3 for Green Party of Quebec, 2 for Option nationale)	43
Forum	August 28, 2012	PDF			4	67	19	3	8 (Note: 5 for Green Party of Quebec, 2 for Option nationale)	48
Leger	August 24, 2012	PDF			9	67	15	2	6 (Note: 4 for Green Party of Quebec)	66
Leger	August 16, 2012	PDF			2	65	20	5	8 (Note: 5 for Green Party of Quebec)	45
Leger	August 8, 2012	PDF			3	81	9	1	7 (Note: 4 for Green Party of Quebec, 2 for Option nationale)	72
Forum	August 7, 2012	PDF			6	71	5	3	6 (Note: 6 for Green Party of Quebec)	65
Forum	August 1, 2012	PDF			14	73	5	3	5 (Note: 5 for Green Party of Quebec)	59
Leger	July 31, 2012	PDF			10	59	11	6	14 (Note: 7 for Green Party of Quebec)	
Leger	June 14, 2012	PDF			6	56	15	7	16 (Note: 7 for Green Party of Quebec)	
Leger	May 21, 2012	PDF			6	64	10	10	8 (Note: 8 for Green Party of Quebec)	
Segma	May 17, 2012	PDF			14	55	13	8	9 (Note: 8 for Green Party of Quebec)	
Leger	May 2 , 2012	PDF			4	54	14	6	22 (Note: 12 for Green Party of Quebec, 1 for Option nationale)	
Forum	24 April 2012	PDF			10	69	5	4	12 (Note: 11 for Green Party of Quebec)	
CROP	April 23, 2012	PDF			4	69	6	6	12 (Note: 6 for Green Party of Quebec, 2 for Option nationale)	
Leger	March 7, 2012	PDF			4	61	19	4	12 (Note: 6 for Green Party of Quebec,)	
Leger	January 12, 2012	PDF			3	69	12	4	12 (Note: 6 for Green Party of Quebec)	
Leger	December 14, 2011	PDF			8	53	15	7	17 (Note: 12 for Green Party of Quebec)	
Leger	November 17, 2011	PDF			4	57	12	2	25 (Note: 8 for Green Party of Quebec, 8 for Action démocratique du Québec)	
Leger	October 27, 2011	PDF			10	47	15	4	24 (Note: 9 for Green Party of Quebec, 8 for Action démocratique du Québec)	
Leger	October 12, 2011	PDF			5	55		10	30 (Note: 9 for Green Party of Quebec, 8 for Action démocratique du Québec)	
Leger	September 15, 2011	PDF			6	56		4	34 (Note: 12 for Green Party of Quebec, 12 for Action démocratique du Québec)	
CROP	June 20 , 2011	PDF			4	72		3	21 (Note: 10 for Green Party of Quebec, 8 for Action démocratique du Québec)	
Leger	June 8, 2011	PDF			6	61		6	27 (Note: 5 for Green Party of Quebec, 15 for Action démocratique du Québec)	
CROP	April 20, 2011	PDF			3	58		4	36 (Note: 13 for Green Party of Quebec, 17 for Action démocratique du Québec)	
Leger	April 14, 2011	PDF			11	68		2	19 (Note: 9 for Green Party of Quebec, 6 for Action démocratique du Québec)	
Leger	March 10, 2011	PDF			17	59		5	19 (Note: 9 for Green Party of Quebec, 3 for Action démocratique du Québec)	
Leger	February 10, 2011	PDF			7	64		1	28 (Note: 15 for Green Party of Quebec, 6 for Action démocratique du Québec)	
Leger	September 16, 2010	PDF			10	63		5	22 (Note: 11 for Green Party of Quebec, 6 for Action démocratique du Québec)	
Leger	August 19, 2010	PDF			8	66		4	23 (Note: 13 for Green Party of Quebec, 5 for Action démocratique du Québec)	
Leger	June 10, 2010	PDF			9	64		2	26 (Note: 12 for Green Party of Quebec, 9 for Action démocratique du Québec)	
Leger	March 11, 2010	PDF			7	67		9	16 (Note: 8 for Green Party of Quebec, 6 for Action démocratique du Québec)	
Leger	February 11, 2010	PDF			9	68		4	19 (Note: 8 for Green Party of Quebec, 9 for Action démocratique du Québec)	
Leger	14 January 2010	PDF			7	77		3	13 (Note: 8 for Green Party of Quebec, 1 for Action démocratique du Québec)	
Leger	November 26, 2009	PDF			14	72		2	17 (Note: 8 for Green Party of Quebec, 2 for Action démocratique du Québec)	
Leger	September 2 , 2009	PDF			7	70		6	17 (Note: 6 for Green Party of Quebec, 8 for Action démocratique du Québec)	
Leger	May 17, 2009	PDF			9	74		3	13 (Note: 8 for Green Party of Quebec, 3 for Action démocratique du Québec)	
CROP	March 23, 2009	PDF			3	64		8	23 (Note: 16 for Green Party of Quebec, 7 for Action démocratique du Québec)	
Leger	March 5, 2009	PDF			9	71		9	11 (Note: 1 for Green Party of Quebec, 8 for Action démocratique du Québec)	
Leger	February 25, 2009	PDF			7	81		3	9 (Note: 6 for Green Party of Quebec, 2 for Action démocratique du Québec)	
CROP	25 January 2009	PDF			4	78		3	15 (Note: 9 for Green Party of Quebec, 5 for Action démocratique du Québec)	

== Results ==
Summary of the September 4, 2012, National Assembly of Quebec election results
Party	Party leader	Candidates	Seats					Popular vote		
Party	Party leader	Candidates	2008	Dissol.	2012	Change	%	Number	%	Change (pp)
Parti Québécois	Pauline Marois	125	51	47	54	+3	43.20	1,393,703	31.95	-3.22
Liberal	Jean Charest	125	66	64	50	-16	40.00	1,360,968	31.20	-10.88
Coalition Avenir Québec	François Legault	125	7^{†}	9	19	+12^{†}	15.20	1,180,235	27.05	+10.68^{†}
Québec solidaire	Françoise David, Amir Khadir^{††}	124	1	1	2	+1	1.60	263,111	6.03	+2.25
Option nationale	Jean-Martin Aussant	120	*	1	—	*	—	82,539	1.89	*
Green	Claude Sabourin	66	—	—	—	—	—	43,394	0.99	-1.18
Independent		46	—	1	—	—	—	11,578	0.27	+0.07
Conservative	Luc Harvey	27	*	—	—	*	—	7,654	0.18	*
Coalition pour la constituante	Marc Fafard	29	*	—	—	*	—	5,197	0.12	*
Parti nul	Renaud Blais	10	*	—	—	*	—	2,743	0.06	*
Équipe Autonomiste	Guy Boivin	17	*	—	—	*	—	2,182	0.05	*
Quebec Citizens' Union	Alexis St-Gelais	20	*	—	—	*	—	2,089	0.05	*
Parti de la classe moyenne	Jean Lavoie	7	*	—	—	*	—	2,053	0.05	*
Marxist–Leninist	Pierre Chénier	25	—	—	—	—	—	1,969	0.05	-0.03
Parti indépendantiste	Michel Lepage	10	—	—	—	—	—	1,244	0.03	-0.10
Unité Nationale	Paul Biron	12	*	—	—	*	—	1,227	0.03	*
Bloc Pot	Hugô St-Onge	2	*	—	—	*	—	420	0.01	*
Quebec – Democratic Revolution	Robert Genesse	1	*	—	—	*	—	256	0.01	*
Parti équitable	Yvan Rodrigue	1	*	—	—	*	—	126	0.00	*
Independent Option nationale			*	1						
Vacant				1						
Total		892	125	125	125	0	100.00%	4,362,688	100.00	
Valid ballots								4,362,688	98.78	+0.28
Rejected ballots								53,749	1.22	-0.28
Voter turnout								4,416,437	74.60	+17.17
Registered electors								5,919,778		

Notes:

^{†} Results change is compared to the Action démocratique du Québec in 2008.
^{††} The party avoids formally designating David and Khadir as co-leaders, relying instead on internal direct democracy during general assembly meetings; the de jure leader recognized by the Chief Electoral Officer of Quebec (DGE) is Régent Séguin.
* Party did not nominate candidates in the previous election.

^1 Results change is compared to the Action démocratique du Québec in 2008.

=== Vote and seat summaries ===
Ternary plots - shift of electoral support (2008-2012)
2008

2012
Electoral districts identified by colours of winning parties

Vote share
PQ	31.95%
PLQ	31.20%
CAQ	27.05%
QS	6.03%
Option nationale	1.89%
Green	0.99%
Others	0.89%

Seats
PQ	43.20%
PLQ	40.00%
CAQ	15.20%
QS	1.60%

=== Synopsis of results ===
Results by riding - 2012 Quebec general election
Riding	Winning party								Turnout (Note: including spoilt ballots)	Votes (Note: All parties with more than 1% of the vote are shown individually. Independent candidates and other minor parties are aggregated separately. Parties are presented in the order shown on EQ data.)								
Name	2008	1st place	Votes	Share	Margin #	Margin %	2nd place	3rd place	Turnout	PLQ	PQ	CAQ	QS	PVQ	ON	Ind	Other	Total
Abitibi-Est	PLQ	PQ	8,430	38.39%	777	3.54%	PLQ	CAQ	67.38%	7,653	8,430	4,059	1,047	316	452	–	–	21,957
Abitibi-Ouest	PQ	PQ	12,066	51.39%	7,307	31.12%	CAQ	PLQ	67.79%	4,399	12,066	4,759	1,260	–	997	–	–	23,481
Acadie	PLQ	PLQ	17,191	55.65%	11,798	38.19%	CAQ	PQ	64.76%	17,191	5,319	5,393	2,474	–	512	–	–	30,889
Anjou–Louis-Riel	PLQ	PLQ	12,953	40.12%	2,955	9.15%	PQ	CAQ	75.33%	12,953	9,998	6,371	2,347	–	407	–	212	32,288
Argenteuil	PLQ	PQ	12,449	38.52%	3,062	9.47%	PLQ	CAQ	74.33%	9,387	12,449	8,564	855	653	409	–	–	32,317
Arthabaska	PLQ	CAQ	19,016	42.42%	5,393	12.03%	PLQ	PQ	78.07%	13,623	8,991	19,016	1,775	501	519	316	91	44,832
Beauce-Nord	ADQ	CAQ	18,126	57.34%	10,156	32.13%	PLQ	PQ	76.58%	7,970	3,207	18,126	697	345	286	266	716	31,613
Beauce-Sud	PLQ	PLQ	14,791	42.39%	650	1.86%	CAQ	PQ	74.02%	14,791	3,987	14,141	861	–	558	302	256	34,896
Beauharnois	PQ	PQ	15,117	45.16%	6,518	19.47%	CAQ	PLQ	75.07%	6,861	15,117	8,599	1,328	512	515	353	188	33,473
Bellechasse	PLQ	PLQ	13,119	40.67%	698	2.16%	CAQ	PQ	76.12%	13,119	4,896	12,421	989	–	–	–	830	32,255
Berthier	PQ	PQ	19,584	46.94%	6,130	14.69%	CAQ	PLQ	75.69%	5,477	19,584	13,454	2,015	518	452	–	221	41,721
Bertrand	PQ	PQ	18,305	41.69%	4,300	9.79%	CAQ	PLQ	77.73%	7,602	18,305	14,005	2,351	682	744	–	222	43,911
Blainville	PQ	CAQ	19,288	41.32%	2,709	5.80%	PQ	PLQ	81.86%	7,401	16,579	19,288	1,817	701	749	–	141	46,676
Bonaventure	PLQ	PQ	11,809	47.55%	3,144	12.66%	PLQ	CAQ	69.31%	8,665	11,809	2,766	1,278	–	315	–	–	24,833
Borduas	PQ	PQ	18,363	39.32%	2,511	5.38%	CAQ	PLQ	84.46%	7,996	18,363	15,852	2,715	723	938	–	110	46,697
Bourassa-Sauvé	PLQ	PLQ	12,518	42.28%	4,426	14.95%	PQ	CAQ	64.17%	12,518	8,092	5,165	3,045	465	324	–	–	29,609
Bourget	PQ	PQ	16,379	45.68%	8,876	24.75%	CAQ	PLQ	74.19%	6,960	16,379	7,503	3,381	537	702	–	394	35,856
Brome-Missisquoi	PLQ	PLQ	13,841	33.02%	303	0.72%	CAQ	PQ	76.55%	13,841	10,670	13,538	1,944	724	490	268	437	41,912
Chambly	PQ	PQ	15,104	40.13%	2,247	5.97%	CAQ	PLQ	83.50%	6,203	15,104	12,857	1,878	633	765	–	199	37,639
Champlain	PQ	PQ	13,624	36.73%	1,404	3.79%	CAQ	PLQ	77.14%	8,188	13,624	12,220	1,541	–	1,084	319	113	37,089
Chapleau	PLQ	PLQ	14,812	42.13%	5,666	16.11%	PQ	CAQ	65.32%	14,812	9,146	8,191	1,731	774	421	–	86	35,161
Charlesbourg	PLQ	CAQ	15,278	36.89%	1,125	2.72%	PLQ	PQ	79.91%	14,153	8,760	15,278	1,612	–	780	232	603	41,418
Charlevoix–Côte-de-Beaupré	PQ	PQ	15,472	40.65%	5,171	13.58%	PLQ	CAQ	75.95%	10,301	15,472	10,203	1,227	–	619	–	243	38,065
Châteauguay	PLQ	PLQ	13,819	37.64%	2,220	6.05%	PQ	CAQ	75.43%	13,819	11,599	8,734	1,220	684	396	–	259	36,711
Chauveau	ADQ	CAQ	23,449	52.99%	12,542	28.34%	PLQ	PQ	78.93%	10,907	7,247	23,449	1,337	–	677	–	633	44,250
Chicoutimi	PQ	PQ	15,768	44.51%	6,907	19.50%	CAQ	PLQ	76.77%	7,925	15,768	8,861	1,755	–	679	–	440	35,428
Chomedey	PLQ	PLQ	21,893	57.24%	14,514	37.95%	CAQ	PQ	67.91%	21,893	6,340	7,379	1,362	663	341	267	–	38,245
Chutes-de-la-Chaudière	ADQ	CAQ	24,267	53.79%	13,911	30.84%	PLQ	PQ	84.12%	10,356	7,678	24,267	1,727	622	–	–	462	45,112
Côte-du-Sud	PLQ	PLQ	14,047	38.91%	3,296	9.13%	CAQ	PQ	72.22%	14,047	9,293	10,751	1,221	–	532	–	259	36,103
Crémazie	PQ	PQ	13,392	38.61%	3,388	9.77%	PLQ	CAQ	76.63%	10,004	13,392	5,933	4,014	518	825	–	–	34,686
D'Arcy-McGee	PLQ	PLQ	22,285	84.72%	20,347	77.35%	CAQ	QS	65.82%	22,285	767	1,938	987	–	–	328	–	26,305
Deux-Montagnes	PQ	PQ	14,423	38.80%	1,321	3.55%	CAQ	PLQ	79.99%	6,689	14,423	13,102	1,522	724	712	–	–	37,172
Drummond–Bois-Francs	PQ	CAQ	13,879	37.59%	2,505	6.78%	PQ	PLQ	75.65%	8,230	11,374	13,879	1,607	–	950	355	528	36,923
Dubuc	PLQ	PQ	12,345	42.19%	4,265	14.58%	PLQ	CAQ	74.63%	8,080	12,345	6,921	1,118	–	343	455	–	29,262
Duplessis	PQ	PQ	12,393	53.01%	6,251	26.74%	PLQ	CAQ	61.60%	6,142	12,393	2,694	1,032	–	593	119	407	23,380
Fabre	PLQ	PLQ	13,305	37.50%	3,381	9.53%	PQ	CAQ	75.96%	13,305	9,924	9,852	1,260	547	388	207	–	35,483
Gaspé	PLQ	PQ	11,825	56.79%	5,972	28.68%	PLQ	CAQ	67.58%	5,853	11,825	1,971	779	–	395	–	–	20,823
Gatineau	PLQ	PLQ	16,835	45.67%	6,752	18.32%	PQ	CAQ	66.24%	16,835	10,083	6,923	1,648	913	372	–	87	36,861
Gouin	PQ	QS	15,483	46.03%	4,556	13.54%	PQ	PLQ	77.93%	3,924	10,927	2,713	15,483	448	–	–	143	33,638
Granby	ADQ	CAQ	19,517	52.14%	11,015	29.43%	PQ	PLQ	76.13%	6,051	8,502	19,517	2,121	–	477	–	764	37,432
Groulx	PQ	CAQ	16,711	38.02%	1,763	4.01%	PQ	PLQ	79.08%	8,776	14,948	16,711	1,892	591	895	140	–	43,953
Hochelaga-Maisonneuve	PQ	PQ	12,754	45.10%	6,053	21.40%	QS	CAQ	70.08%	3,262	12,754	3,564	6,701	453	1,116	–	431	28,281
Hull	PLQ	PLQ	13,179	39.48%	2,473	7.41%	PQ	CAQ	65.24%	13,179	10,706	5,323	2,651	787	288	–	451	33,385
Huntingdon	PLQ	PLQ	11,896	39.60%	3,889	12.95%	PQ	CAQ	73.32%	11,896	8,007	7,721	1,116	448	289	–	563	30,040
Iberville	PQ	PQ	13,779	38.90%	1,953	5.51%	CAQ	PLQ	77.99%	6,833	13,779	11,826	1,462	853	669	–	–	35,422
Îles-de-la-Madeleine	PLQ	PQ	4,304	51.01%	1,060	12.56%	PLQ	CAQ	78.08%	3,244	4,304	407	403	–	80	–	–	8,438
Jacques-Cartier	PLQ	PLQ	24,525	73.11%	19,519	58.18%	CAQ	PVQ	76.89%	24,525	1,232	5,006	859	1,522	128	189	86	33,547
Jean-Lesage	PLQ	PLQ	9,965	30.60%	651	2.00%	PQ	CAQ	71.13%	9,965	9,314	8,894	2,598	–	1,289	222	281	32,563
Jean-Talon	PLQ	PLQ	13,534	37.31%	3,471	9.57%	PQ	CAQ	80.93%	13,534	10,063	8,747	2,321	–	1,351	–	262	36,278
Jeanne-Mance-Viger	PLQ	PLQ	20,912	65.39%	16,269	50.87%	CAQ	PQ	67.41%	20,912	4,295	4,643	1,618	–	410	–	104	31,982
Johnson	PQ	PQ	15,007	36.16%	203	0.49%	CAQ	PLQ	74.96%	8,434	15,007	14,804	1,887	–	889	–	479	41,500
Joliette	PQ	PQ	20,509	47.12%	7,500	17.23%	CAQ	PLQ	78.34%	6,102	20,509	13,009	2,449	–	649	513	294	43,525
Jonquière	PQ	PQ	16,429	48.22%	7,889	23.16%	CAQ	PLQ	76.13%	6,833	16,429	8,540	1,089	–	427	218	534	34,070
Labelle	PQ	PQ	17,181	50.71%	9,099	26.86%	CAQ	PLQ	72.37%	5,749	17,181	8,082	1,976	574	319	–	–	33,881
Lac-Saint-Jean	PQ	PQ	16,972	53.11%	9,268	29.00%	CAQ	PLQ	75.53%	5,270	16,972	7,704	1,214	275	323	–	200	31,958
LaFontaine	PLQ	PLQ	17,081	59.14%	12,255	42.43%	PQ	CAQ	71.31%	17,081	4,826	4,728	1,248	507	252	–	238	28,880
La Peltrie	ADQ	CAQ	21,871	51.88%	10,124	24.01%	PLQ	PQ	79.05%	11,747 (Note: Jean-François Gosselin was previously elected in 2007 as the adéquiste MNA for Jean-Lesage.)	6,069	21,871	1,069	–	690	552	162	42,160
La Pinière	PLQ	PLQ	20,551	49.25%	10,331	24.76%	CAQ	PQ	72.13%	20,551	7,448	10,220	1,832	798	433	–	442	41,724
Laporte	PLQ	PLQ	12,827	37.19%	2,075	6.02%	PQ	CAQ	76.33%	12,827	10,752	8,023	2,043	–	550	–	291	34,486
La Prairie	PQ	CAQ	11,094	32.64%	75	0.22%	PQ	PLQ	82.45%	9,338	11,019	11,094	1,195	469	473	–	399	33,987
L'Assomption	PQ	CAQ	17,166	42.21%	1,078	2.65%	PQ	PLQ	80.43%	4,694	16,088	17,166 (Note: François Legault was previously the péquiste MNA for Rousseau.)	1,465	588	667	–	–	40,668
Laurier-Dorion	PLQ	PLQ	10,987	34.08%	2,463	7.64%	PQ	QS	70.21%	10,987	8,524	3,154	7,844	480	912	169	166	32,236
Laval-des-Rapides	PLQ	PQ	14,934	38.33%	2,362	6.06%	PLQ	CAQ	73.37%	12,572	14,934	8,493	1,643	517	594	–	205	38,958
Laviolette	PLQ	PLQ	10,903	43.17%	3,116	12.34%	PQ	CAQ	71.86%	10,903	7,787	4,934	951	–	492	124	67	25,258
Lévis	PLQ	CAQ	14,528	39.87%	3,273	8.98%	PLQ	PQ	79.35%	11,255	7,302	14,528	1,904	–	669	–	778	36,436
Lotbinière-Frontenac	New	PLQ	17,681	43.32%	4,956	12.14%	CAQ	PQ	77.06%	17,681	8,629	12,725	1,783	–	–	–	–	40,818
Louis-Hébert	PLQ	PLQ	14,602	38.42%	2,092	5.50%	CAQ	PQ	86.57%	14,602	8,127	12,510	1,359	–	706	–	700	38,004
Marguerite-Bourgeoys	PLQ	PLQ	19,993	56.91%	13,049	37.14%	PQ	CAQ	69.05%	19,993	6,944	6,104	1,434	–	543	–	113	35,131
Marie-Victorin	PQ	PQ	15,506	47.10%	8,387	25.48%	CAQ	PLQ	71.88%	5,773	15,506	7,119	2,702	648	832	–	338	32,918
Marquette	PLQ	PLQ	15,343	49.20%	8,660	27.77%	PQ	CAQ	70.39%	15,343	6,683	6,101	1,628	992	440	–	–	31,187
Maskinongé	PLQ	PLQ	11,676	32.06%	769	2.11%	CAQ	PQ	77.97%	11,676	10,888	10,907	1,334	389	784	–	437	36,415
Masson	PQ	PQ	17,377	45.96%	3,713	9.82%	CAQ	PLQ	78.17%	4,178	17,377	13,664	1,199	545	716	–	134	37,813
Matane-Matapédia	New	PQ	19,768	58.99%	13,505	40.30%	PLQ	CAQ	70.96%	6,263	19,768	5,332	1,230	348	440	–	127	33,508
Mégantic	PLQ	PLQ	9,946	35.09%	1,099	3.88%	PQ	CAQ	74.44%	9,946	8,847	7,260	1,531	–	473	284	–	28,341
Mercier	QS	QS	14,164	46.73%	7,027	23.18%	PQ	PLQ	76.27%	4,091	7,137	3,336	14,164	859	722	–	–	30,309
Mille-Îles	PLQ	PLQ	11,946	37.39%	1,797	5.63%	PQ	CAQ	77.62%	11,946	10,149	7,467	1,511	343	354	122	54	31,946
Mirabel	PQ	PQ	19,467	43.77%	3,300	7.42%	CAQ	PLQ	78.39%	5,812	19,467	16,167	1,687	–	988	353	–	44,474
Montarville	PQ	CAQ	16,083	35.74%	1,908	4.24%	PQ	PLQ	87.66%	11,020	14,175	16,083	2,010	633	877	–	205	45,003
Montmorency	PLQ	CAQ	16,239	38.21%	2,122	4.99%	PLQ	PQ	78.36%	14,117	8,736	16,239	1,460	–	755	517	671	42,495
Mont-Royal	PLQ	PLQ	16,892	66.23%	13,505	52.95%	CAQ	PQ	62.20%	16,892	2,276	3,387	1,743	597	363	–	248	25,506
Nelligan	PLQ	PLQ	27,470	66.31%	19,816	47.84%	CAQ	PQ	73.21%	27,470	3,716	7,654	966	1,238	292	–	89	41,425
Nicolet-Bécancour	PQ	CAQ	9,745	32.01%	1,876	6.16%	ON	PLQ	78.61%	6,840	5,644	9,745	–	–	7,869	–	348	30,446
Notre-Dame-de-Grâce	PLQ	PLQ	16,761	62.65%	13,118	49.03%	CAQ	QS	67.94%	16,761	2,217	3,643	2,291	1,531	236	–	74	26,753
Orford	PLQ	PLQ	11,448	36.58%	1,888	6.03%	PQ	CAQ	78.10%	11,448	9,560	7,558	1,687	554	356	–	134	31,297
Outremont	PLQ	PLQ	10,949	41.52%	4,830	18.32%	PQ	QS	68.21%	10,949	6,119	3,691	4,751	–	451	–	410	26,371
Papineau	PLQ	PLQ	12,996	34.76%	167	0.45%	PQ	CAQ	66.53%	12,996	12,829	8,218	1,963	–	574	246	561	37,387
Pointe-aux-Trembles	PQ	PQ	15,406	50.26%	7,981	26.04%	CAQ	PLQ	76.37%	4,732	15,406	7,425	1,811	–	672	425	182	30,653
Pontiac	PLQ	PLQ	16,981	56.63%	11,564	38.56%	CAQ	PQ	62.13%	16,981	4,835	5,417	1,565	906	223	–	61	29,988
Portneuf	PLQ	CAQ	12,605	40.65%	2,203	7.10%	PLQ	PQ	77.81%	10,402	5,568	12,605	932	–	534	567	403	31,011
René-Lévesque	PQ	PQ	13,634	59.68%	9,474	41.47%	PLQ	CAQ	66.67%	4,160	13,634	3,643	892	–	517	–	–	22,846
Repentigny	New	PQ	16,762	40.70%	1,237	3.00%	CAQ	PLQ	82.46%	6,217	16,762	15,525	1,730	–	948	–	–	41,182
Richelieu	PQ	PQ	14,474	43.05%	3,601	10.71%	CAQ	PLQ	77.69%	6,128	14,474	10,873	1,084	–	1,065	–	–	33,624
Richmond	PLQ	PLQ	15,962	35.50%	269	0.60%	PQ	CAQ	79.26%	15,962	15,693	9,751	1,858	684	810	–	201	44,959
Rimouski	PQ	PQ	15,979	48.35%	8,721	26.39%	PLQ	CAQ	75.56%	7,258	15,979	5,684	2,409	630	910	–	182	33,052
Rivière-du-Loup–Témiscouata	New	PLQ	15,317	40.91%	2,447	6.54%	PQ	CAQ	74.56%	15,317	12,870	6,949	1,116	647	410	–	135	37,444
Robert-Baldwin	PLQ	PLQ	27,904	75.21%	23,087	62.23%	CAQ	PQ	69.09%	27,904	1,978	4,817	1,083	988	194	–	138	37,102
Roberval	PQ	PQ	15,069	46.70%	5,912	18.32%	PLQ	CAQ	72.59%	9,157	15,069	6,252	1,302	–	488	–	–	32,268
Rosemont	PQ	PQ	16,780	43.67%	8,944	23.28%	PLQ	CAQ	76.10%	7,836	16,780	6,657	5,564	–	1,079	–	507	38,423
Rousseau	PQ	PQ	18,112	41.72%	1,116	2.57%	CAQ	PLQ	72.54%	5,186	18,112	16,996	2,163	–	536	232	189	43,414
Rouyn-Noranda-Témiscamingue	PLQ	PQ	11,082	36.78%	3,099	10.29%	PLQ	CAQ	69.01%	7,983	11,082	7,140	2,941	451	534	–	–	30,131
Sainte-Marie-Saint-Jacques	PQ	PQ	10,199	35.76%	2,946	10.33%	QS	PLQ	68.18%	5,531	10,199	4,216	7,253	–	880	154	290	28,523
Sainte-Rose	New	PQ	13,508	34.86%	2,038	5.26%	CAQ	PLQ	79.12%	11,054	13,508	11,470	1,689	–	764	263	–	38,748
Saint-François	PLQ	PQ	15,303	36.34%	65	0.15%	PLQ	CAQ	77.25%	15,238	15,303	7,607	2,103	809	932	–	124	42,116
Saint-Henri-Sainte-Anne	PLQ	PLQ	13,894	38.46%	2,307	6.39%	PQ	CAQ	68.11%	13,894	11,587	5,573	4,084	–	827	–	157	36,122
Saint-Hyacinthe	PQ	PQ	16,082	36.32%	2,120	4.79%	CAQ	PLQ	78.68%	10,552	16,082	13,962	2,198	–	803	–	679	44,276
Saint-Jean	PQ	PQ	18,304	40.73%	3,847	8.56%	CAQ	PLQ	78.34%	8,955	18,304	14,457	1,886	–	770	–	566	44,938
Saint-Jérôme	PQ	CAQ	16,179	39.96%	897	2.22%	PQ	PLQ	75.41%	5,087	15,282	16,179	2,903	506	532	–	–	40,489
Saint-Laurent	PLQ	PLQ	22,481	65.67%	17,579	51.35%	CAQ	PQ	64.52%	22,481	3,878	4,902	1,718	684	384	–	187	34,234
Saint-Maurice	PQ	PQ	9,395	35.65%	1,897	7.20%	CAQ	PLQ	73.55%	7,158	9,395	7,498	1,250	–	519	442	90	26,352
Sanguinet	New	PQ	12,384	40.68%	2,527	8.30%	CAQ	PLQ	80.39%	6,072	12,384	9,857 (Note: François Rebello was previously the péquiste MNA for La Prairie.)	1,056	–	401	315	355	30,440
Sherbrooke	PLQ	PQ	15,909	42.12%	2,642	7.00%	PLQ	CAQ	78.10%	13,267	15,909	4,457	2,586	407	1,069	–	73	37,768
Soulanges	PLQ	PLQ	12,795	35.05%	1,514	4.15%	PQ	CAQ	79.00%	12,795	11,281	10,234	1,323	–	495	378	–	36,506
Taillon	PQ	PQ	15,508	40.21%	4,736	12.28%	CAQ	PLQ	76.76%	7,470	15,508	10,772	2,874	590	932	183	240	38,569
Taschereau	PQ	PQ	13,994	37.06%	4,297	11.38%	PLQ	CAQ	77.37%	9,697	13,994	6,311	4,416	–	2,804	–	540	37,762
Terrebonne	PQ	PQ	19,077	44.53%	3,648	8.52%	CAQ	PLQ	80.21%	5,646	19,077	15,429	1,380	635	510	–	160	42,837
Trois-Rivières	PLQ	PLQ	11,255	35.15%	1,001	3.13%	PQ	CAQ	75.22%	11,255	10,254	7,447	1,615	–	1,121	217	110	32,019
Ungava	PQ	PQ	4,854	45.52%	1,153	10.81%	PLQ	CAQ	41.62%	3,701	4,854	1,176	655	–	277	–	–	10,663
Vachon	PQ	PQ	14,824	39.58%	3,729	9.96%	CAQ	PLQ	78.68%	7,966	14,824	11,095	1,890	808	670	–	197	37,450
Vanier-Les Rivières	PLQ	CAQ	16,333	37.92%	1,331	3.09%	PLQ	PQ	78.67%	15,002	8,038	16,333	1,371	569	924	322	508	43,067
Vaudreuil	PLQ	PLQ	19,375	45.07%	8,362	19.45%	CAQ	PQ	76.43%	19,375	8,902	11,013	2,099	1,067	444	–	93	42,993
Verchères	PQ	PQ	22,052	47.27%	7,370	15.80%	CAQ	PLQ	84.14%	6,419	22,052	14,682	1,900	–	1,035	297	269	46,654
Verdun	PLQ	PLQ	11,920	35.42%	547	1.63%	PQ	CAQ	71.37%	11,920	11,373	6,373	2,449	825	525	–	185	33,650
Viau	PLQ	PLQ	11,788	47.28%	5,888	23.61%	PQ	CAQ	62.35%	11,788	5,900	3,103	2,873	530	740	–	–	24,934
Vimont	PLQ	PLQ	12,973	37.48%	2,409	6.96%	PQ	CAQ	79.34%	12,973	10,564	8,544	1,373	–	688	253	219	34,614
Westmount-Saint-Louis	PLQ	PLQ	15,774	67.69%	12,718	54.58%	CAQ	PQ	59.44%	15,774	1,739	3,056	1,493	916	230	94	–	23,302

= open seat
= turnout is above provincial average
= winning candidate was in previous Legislature
= incumbent had switched allegiance
= previously incumbent in another riding
= not incumbent; was previously elected to the Legislature
= incumbency arose from byelection gain
= other incumbents renominated
= previously an MP in the House of Commons of Canada
= multiple candidates

=== Comparative analysis for ridings (2012 vs 2008) ===
Summary of riding results by turnout and vote share for winning candidate (vs 2008)
Riding and winning party			Turnout		Vote share	
Riding and winning party			%	Change (pp)	%	Change (pp)
Abitibi-Est	PQ	Gain	67.38	8.65	38.39	-4.71
Abitibi-Ouest	PQ	Hold	67.79	10.73	51.39	-5.94
Acadie	PLQ	Hold	64.76	17.85	55.65	-11.51
Anjou–Louis-Riel	PLQ	Hold	75.33	16.45	40.12	-10.32
Argenteuil	PQ	Gain	74.33	20.15	38.52	4.90
Arthabaska	CAQ	Gain	78.07	14.11	42.42	17.54
Beauce-Nord	CAQ	Hold	76.58	12.72	57.34	7.42
Beauce-Sud	PLQ	Hold	74.02	14.02	42.39	-1.24
Beauharnois	PQ	Hold	75.07	14.06	45.16	-1.99
Bellechasse	PLQ	Hold	76.12	11.76	40.67	-6.98
Berthier	PQ	Hold	75.69	15.26	46.94	4.44
Bertrand	PQ	Hold	77.73	19.69	41.69	-7.44
Blainville	CAQ	Gain	81.86	20.95	41.32	19.39
Bonaventure	PQ	Gain	69.31	11.30	47.55	18.50
Borduas	PQ	Hold	84.46	18.59	39.32	-8.33
Bourassa-Sauvé	PLQ	Hold	64.17	16.49	42.28	-19.05
Bourget	PQ	Hold	74.19	18.63	45.68	-4.51
Brome-Missisquoi	PLQ	Hold	76.55	16.16	33.02	-16.22
Chambly	PQ	Hold	83.50	16.88	40.13	0.12
Champlain	PQ	Hold	77.14	12.76	36.73	-4.25
Chapleau	PLQ	Hold	65.32	17.36	42.13	-12.58
Charlesbourg	CAQ	Gain	79.91	14.12	36.89	7.60
Charlevoix–Côte-de-Beaupré	PQ	Hold	75.95	14.94	40.65	-11.57
Châteauguay	PLQ	Hold	75.43	17.17	37.64	-3.85
Chauveau	CAQ	Hold	78.93	17.30	52.99	10.24
Chicoutimi	PQ	Hold	76.77	13.05	44.51	-1.45
Chomedey	PLQ	Hold	67.91	22.70	57.24	-8.87
Chutes-de-la-Chaudière	CAQ	Hold	84.12	16.96	53.79	9.02
Côte-du-Sud	PLQ	Hold	72.22	10.94	38.91	-12.87
Crémazie	PQ	Hold	76.63	14.33	38.61	-6.52
D'Arcy-McGee	PLQ	Hold	65.82	26.92	84.72	-4.03
Deux-Montagnes	PQ	Hold	79.99	18.96	38.80	-4.34
Drummond–Bois-Francs	CAQ	Gain	75.65	16.35	37.59	8.40
Dubuc	PQ	Gain	74.63	13.99	42.19	1.28
Duplessis	PQ	Hold	61.60	11.35	53.01	0.66
Fabre	PLQ	Hold	75.96	18.88	37.50	-8.00
Gaspé	PQ	Gain	67.58	9.40	56.79	17.27
Gatineau	PLQ	Hold	66.24	16.76	45.67	-14.13
Gouin	QS	Gain	77.93	19.91	46.03	14.18
Granby	CAQ	Hold	76.13	17.25	52.14	17.51
Groulx	CAQ	Gain	79.08	17.74	38.02	17.79
Hochelaga-Maisonneuve	PQ	Hold	70.08	22.26	45.10	-9.21
Hull	PLQ	Hold	65.24	17.53	39.48	-11.79
Huntingdon	PLQ	Hold	73.32	15.51	39.60	-4.73
Iberville	PQ	Hold	77.99	16.37	38.90	-2.38
Îles-de-la-Madeleine	PQ	Gain	78.08	11.73	51.01	5.64
Jacques-Cartier	PLQ	Hold	76.89	24.12	73.11	-7.75
Jean-Lesage	PLQ	Hold	71.13	12.53	30.60	-11.08
Jeanne-Mance-Viger	PLQ	Hold	67.41	20.45	65.39	-7.66
Jean-Talon	PLQ	Hold	80.93	11.86	37.31	-12.41
Johnson	PQ	Hold	74.96	11.94	36.16	-4.05
Joliette	PQ	Hold	78.34	15.73	47.12	1.03
Jonquière	PQ	Hold	76.13	13.61	48.22	0.54
La Prairie	CAQ	Gain	82.45	18.83	32.64	18.47
Labelle	PQ	Hold	72.37	17.36	50.71	-2.79
Lac-Saint-Jean	PQ	Hold	75.53	12.34	53.11	-2.51
LaFontaine	PLQ	Hold	71.31	20.15	59.14	-10.61
Lapeltrie	CAQ	Hold	79.05	13.69	51.88	12.70
Lapinière	PLQ	Hold	72.13	19.96	49.25	-12.19
Laporte	PLQ	Hold	76.33	18.28	37.19	-11.77
L'Assomption	CAQ	Gain	80.43	17.22	42.21	22.99
Laurier-Dorion	PLQ	Hold	70.21	21.05	34.08	-8.82
Laval-des-Rapides	PQ	Gain	73.37	18.25	38.33	-0.62
Laviolette	PLQ	Hold	71.86	13.14	43.17	-15.89
Lévis	CAQ	Gain	79.35	15.22	39.87	5.65
Lotbinière-Frontenac	PLQ	New	77.06	New	43.32	New
Louis-Hébert	PLQ	Hold	86.57	16.22	38.42	-10.42
Marguerite-Bourgeoys	PLQ	Hold	69.05	20.96	56.91	-9.28
Marie-Victorin	PQ	Hold	71.88	18.59	47.10	-4.46
Marquette	PLQ	Hold	70.39	21.30	49.20	-7.01
Maskinongé	PLQ	Hold	77.97	13.73	32.06	-10.19
Masson	PQ	Hold	78.17	21.07	45.96	-4.72
Matane-Matapédia	PQ	New	70.96	New	58.99	New
Mégantic	PLQ	Hold	74.44	13.74	35.09	-10.00
Mercier	QS	Hold	76.27	20.25	46.73	8.85
Mille-Îles	PLQ	Hold	77.62	16.96	37.39	-9.37
Mirabel	PQ	Hold	78.39	19.74	43.77	-3.64
Montarville	CAQ	Gain	87.66	16.27	35.74	17.28
Montmorency	CAQ	Gain	78.36	13.88	38.21	4.89
Mont-Royal	PLQ	Hold	62.20	23.41	66.23	-10.09
Nelligan	PLQ	Hold	73.21	26.16	66.31	-5.88
Nicolet-Bécancour	CAQ	Gain	78.61	11.23	32.01	5.81
Notre-Dame-de-Grâce	PLQ	Hold	67.94	24.92	62.65	-5.32
Orford	PLQ	Hold	78.10	16.45	36.58	-6.82
Outremont	PLQ	Hold	68.21	19.71	41.52	-12.69
Papineau	PLQ	Hold	66.53	17.59	34.76	-16.34
Pointe-aux-Trembles	PQ	Hold	76.37	19.70	50.26	-6.61
Pontiac	PLQ	Hold	62.13	20.76	56.63	-9.47
Portneuf	CAQ	Gain	77.81	14.17	40.65	7.05
René-Lévesque	PQ	Hold	66.67	12.24	59.68	1.25
Repentigny	PQ	New	82.46	New	40.70	New
Richelieu	PQ	Hold	77.69	15.94	43.05	-3.94
Richmond	PLQ	Hold	79.26	16.24	35.50	-16.00
Rimouski	PQ	Hold	75.56	13.49	48.35	-0.11
Rivière-du-Loup–Témiscouata	PLQ	New	74.56	New	40.91	New
Robert-Baldwin	PLQ	Hold	69.09	27.57	75.21	-5.86
Roberval	PQ	Hold	72.59	11.96	46.70	0.28
Rosemont	PQ	Hold	76.10	17.44	43.67	-6.99
Rousseau	PQ	Hold	72.54	18.52	41.72	-15.06
Rouyn-Noranda-Témiscamingue	PQ	Gain	69.01	11.46	36.78	1.64
Saint-François	PQ	Gain	77.25	14.68	36.34	-5.58
Saint-Henri-Sainte-Anne	PLQ	Hold	68.11	23.35	38.46	-7.38
Saint-Hyacinthe	PQ	Hold	78.68	15.25	36.32	-1.75
Saint-Jean	PQ	Hold	78.34	16.33	40.73	1.53
Saint-Jérôme	CAQ	Gain	75.41	17.68	39.96	19.02
Saint-Laurent	PLQ	Hold	64.52	23.63	65.67	-8.72
Saint-Maurice	PQ	Hold	73.55	14.05	35.65	-5.75
Sainte-Marie-Saint-Jacques	PQ	Hold	68.18	20.93	35.76	-10.86
Sainte-Rose	PQ	New	79.12	New	34.86	New
Sanguinet	PQ	New	80.39	New	40.68	New
Sherbrooke	PQ	Gain	78.10	15.49	42.12	4.53
Soulanges	PLQ	Hold	79.00	19.86	35.05	-11.24
Taillon	PQ	Hold	76.76	18.13	40.21	-6.14
Taschereau	PQ	Hold	77.37	20.41	37.06	-7.16
Terrebonne	PQ	Hold	80.21	19.73	44.53	-0.69
Trois-Rivières	PLQ	Hold	75.22	14.76	35.15	-4.94
Ungava	PQ	Hold	41.62	5.53	45.52	-1.77
Vachon	PQ	Hold	78.68	17.19	39.58	-9.06
Vanier-Les Rivières	CAQ	Gain	78.67	16.47	37.92	0.99
Vaudreuil	PLQ	Hold	76.43	19.10	45.07	-8.95
Verchères	PQ	Hold	84.14	19.56	47.27	-8.16
Verdun	PLQ	Hold	71.37	20.75	35.42	-12.28
Viau	PLQ	Hold	62.35	17.83	47.28	-11.33
Vimont	PLQ	Hold	79.34	18.99	37.48	-10.30
Westmount-Saint-Louis	PLQ	Hold	59.44	22.63	67.69	-7.47

== List of candidates ==
The deadline for candidacies was August 18, 2012 at 2 pm.

- Official Search page for candidates, by party or by electoral division (monvote.qc.ca, a website of the Chief Electoral Officer of Quebec)

=== (1) Bas-Saint-Laurent and (11) Gaspésie–Îles-de-la-Madeleine ===
Electoral district	Candidates						Incumbent
Electoral district	Liberal	PQ	CAQ	QS	ON	Other	Incumbent
Bonaventure	Damien Arsenault	Sylvain Roy	Jean-Marc Landry	Patricia Chartier	Louis-Patrick St-Pierre		Damien Arsenault
Côte-du-Sud	Norbert Morin	André Simard	François Lagacé	Josée Michaud	Marc-André Robert	Serge Lévesque (ÉA)	Norbert Morin; Montmagny-L'Islet
Gaspé	Georges Mamelonet	Gaétan Lelièvre	Yvan Blanchard	Éric Boucher	Frédérick DeRoy		Georges Mamelonet
Îles-de-la-Madeleine	Germain Chevarie	Jeannine Richard	Georges Painchaud	Yvonne Langford	Jonathan Godin		Germain Chevarie
Matane-Matapédia	Jean-Clément Ouellet	Pascal Bérubé	Pierre d'Amours	Diane Bélanger	Geneviève Allard	Lise Deschênes (Green) Pascal Gauthier (ÉA)	Pascal Bérubé; Matane
Matane-Matapédia	Jean-Clément Ouellet	Pascal Bérubé	Pierre d'Amours	Diane Bélanger	Geneviève Allard	Lise Deschênes (Green) Pascal Gauthier (ÉA)	merged district
Matane-Matapédia	Jean-Clément Ouellet	Pascal Bérubé	Pierre d'Amours	Diane Bélanger	Geneviève Allard	Lise Deschênes (Green) Pascal Gauthier (ÉA)	Danielle Doyer; Matapédia
Rimouski	Raymond Giguère	Irvin Pelletier	Jean-Paul Carrier	Rosalie Carrier Cyr	Pierre Beaudoin	Clément Pelletier (Green) Renaud Blais (PN)	Irvin Pelletier
Rivière-du-Loup–Témiscouata	Jean D'Amour	Michel Lagacé	Gaétan Lavoie	Stacy Larouche	Jonathan St-Pierre	Nadia Pelletier (Green) Sylvain Potvin (CC)	Jean D'Amour; Rivière-du-Loup
Rivière-du-Loup–Témiscouata	Jean D'Amour	Michel Lagacé	Gaétan Lavoie	Stacy Larouche	Jonathan St-Pierre	Nadia Pelletier (Green) Sylvain Potvin (CC)	merged district
Rivière-du-Loup–Témiscouata	Jean D'Amour	Michel Lagacé	Gaétan Lavoie	Stacy Larouche	Jonathan St-Pierre	Nadia Pelletier (Green) Sylvain Potvin (CC)	André Simard; Kamouraska-Témiscouata

=== (2) Saguenay–Lac-Saint-Jean and (9) Côte-Nord ===
Electoral district	Candidates						Incumbent
Electoral district	Liberal	PQ	CAQ	QS	ON	Other	Incumbent
Chicoutimi	Carol Néron	Stéphane Bédard	Alix Boivin	Pierre Dostie	Catherine Bouchard-Tremblay	Simon Lavoie (PCM)	Stéphane Bédard
Dubuc	Serge Simard	Jean-Marie Claveau	François Tremblay	Marie Francine Bienvenue	David Girard	Charles-Olivier B. Tremblay (Ind.) Pascal Tremblay (Ind.)	Serge Simard
Duplessis	Lise Pelletier	Lorraine Richard	Gervais Gagné	Jacques Gélineau	Yan Rivard	Marc Fafard (CC) Alain Magnan (Ind.)	Lorraine Richard
Jonquière	Martine Girard	Sylvain Gaudreault	Pierre-Olivier Simard	Réjean Dumais	Sébastien Lévesque	Alexis St-Gelais (QCU) Alain Létourneau (PN); Tommy Gagnon (Ind.)	Sylvain Gaudreault
Lac-Saint-Jean	Jeannot Boulianne	Alexandre Cloutier	Michel Simard	Frédérick Plamondon	Jordan Racine	France Bergeron (Green) Matthew Babin (BP)	Alexandre Cloutier
René-Lévesque	Pascal Chouinard	Marjolain Dufour	Dereck Blouin-Perry	Julie Gonthier-Brazeau	Maxime Cantin		Marjolain Dufour
Roberval	Georges Simard	Denis Trottier	Alain Hamel	Olivier Bouchard-Lamontagne	Catherine Douesnard		Denis Trottier

=== (3) Capitale-Nationale ===
Electoral district	Candidates						Incumbent
Electoral district	Liberal	PQ	CAQ	QS	ON	Other	Incumbent
Charlesbourg	Michel Pigeon	Christophe Fortier Guay	Denise Trudel	Marie Céline Domingue	Guillaume Cyr	Pierre Chénier (ML) Yves Marier (ÉA); Daniel Lachance (PUN); Jérôme Paquin (PN); Alain Pérusse (Ind.)	Michel Pigeon
Charlevoix–Côte-de-Beaupré	Claire Rémillard	Pauline Marois	Ian Latrémouille	André Jacob	Pierre Tremblay	Daniel Laforest (CC)	Pauline Marois; Charlevoix
Chauveau	Marie-Ève Picard-Bédard	Marie-Ève D’Ascola	Gérard Deltell	Sébastien Bouchard	Ariane Grondin	Gaétan Roy (PC) Noémie Rocque (QCU); Normand Michaud (ÉA); Sylvain Rancourt (PCM)	Gérard Deltell
Jean-Lesage	André Drolet	Pierre Châteauvert	Johanne Lapointe	Élaine Hémond	Christian St-Pierre	Claude Moreau (ML) Simon Beaudoin (QCU); Steve Nadeau (ÉA); Oxana Vassiltchenko (PUN); Debelle Michel (Ind.)	André Drolet
Jean-Talon	Yves Bolduc	Neko Likongo	Hugues Beaulieu	Émilie Guimond-Bélanger	Guillaume Langlois	Stéphane Pouleur (ÉA)	Yves Bolduc
La Peltrie	Jean-François Gosselin	Jean-Luc Jolivet	Éric Caire	Brigitte Hannequin	Alexandre Desmeules	Charlotte Cyr (ÉA) Anthony Leclerc (Ind.)	Éric Caire
Louis-Hébert	Sam Hamad	Rosette Côté	Michel Hamel	Guillaume Boivin	Sol Zanetti	Guillaume Dion (CC) Véronique Durand (PC); Maxime Guérin (QCU); Hugues Fortin (ÉA); Julie Lachance (PN)	Sam Hamad
Montmorency	Raymond Bernier	Michel Létourneau	Michelyne St-Laurent	Lucie Charbonneau	Jean Bouchard	Maryse Belley (ÉA) Luc Duranleau (PI); Jean Lavoie (PCM); Martin Roussel (Ind.)	Raymond Bernier
Portneuf	Michel Matte	René Perreault	Jacques Marcotte	Raphaël Langevin	Marianne Garnier	Sylvie Gagné (PC) Yves St-Amant (Ind.)	Michel Matte
Taschereau	Clément Gignac	Agnès Maltais	Mario Asselin	Serge Roy	Catherine Dorion	François Tremblay (CC) Guy Boivin (ÉA); Jean-Luc Savard (PN)	Agnès Maltais
Vanier-Les Rivières	Patrick Huot	Marc Dean	Sylvain Lévesque	Monique Voisine	Mathieu Fillion	Jean Cloutier (Green) Daniel Brisson (PC); Jean-François Morency (ÉA); Carl Côté (Ind.)	Patrick Huot; Vanier

=== (4) Mauricie ===
Electoral district	Candidates						Incumbent
Electoral district	Liberal	PQ	CAQ	QS	ON	Other	Incumbent
Champlain	Marc-Antoine Trudel	Noëlla Champagne	Pierre Jackson	Yves Sansregret	Émilie Joly	Jessy Trottier (ÉA) Éric L'Abbée (Ind.)	Noëlla Champagne
Laviolette	Julie Boulet	André Beaudoin	Sylvain Medzalabenleth	Jean-François Dubois	Gabriel Pelland	Jean-Paul Bédard (ML) Jean Marceau (Ind.)	Julie Boulet
Maskinongé	Jean-Paul Diamond	Patrick Lahaie	Jean Damphousse	Julie Veilleux	Émilie Viau-Drouin	Laurence J. Requilé (Green) Marie Anny Gosselin (CC); Didier Provencher (ÉA); Linda Delmé (PCM)	Jean-Paul Diamond
Saint-Maurice	Robert Pilotte	Luc Trudel	Pierre Giguère	Luc Lafrance	Nathalie Lortie	Gilles Noël (PUN) Marie-Paule Bertrand (Ind.)	Claude Pinard
Trois-Rivières	Danielle St-Amand	Djemila Benhabib	Andrew D'Amours	Jean-Claude Landry	Charles-Hugo Normand	Kathie Mc Nicoll (ÉA) Robert Deschamps (Ind.)	Danielle St-Amand

=== (5) Estrie (Eastern Townships) ===
Electoral district	Candidates						Incumbent
Electoral district	Liberal	PQ	CAQ	QS	ON	Other	Incumbent
Mégantic	Ghislain Bolduc	Gloriane Blais	Raymonde Lapointe	William Leclerc Bellavance	Jasmin Roy-Rouleau	Jacques Audet (Ind.) Jean-Luc Perron (Ind.)	Johanne Gonthier; Mégantic-Compton
Orford	Pierre Reid	Michel Breton	Jean L'Écuyer	Patricia Tremblay	Marie-Hélène Martin	Guillaume Corriveau (Green) Serge Trottier (CC)	Pierre Reid
Richmond	Karine Vallières	Étienne-Alexis Boucher	Marie-Soleil Perron	Colombe Landry	Jean-Sébastien Lamothe	Nick Fonda (Green) Danielle Voisard (CC)	Yvon Vallières
Saint-François	Nathalie Goguen	Réjean Hébert	Éric Giroux	André Poulin	Gaby Machabée	Lindsay-Jane Gowman (Green) Lionel Lambert (PUN)	Monique Gagnon-Tremblay
Sherbrooke	Jean Charest	Serge Cardin	Philippe Girard	Christian Bibeau	Évelyne Beaudin	Suzanne Richer (Green) Christian Clavet (PI)	Jean Charest

=== (6) Montreal ===
==== East ====
Electoral district	Candidates						Incumbent
Electoral district	Liberal	PQ	CAQ	QS	ON	Other	Incumbent
Anjou–Louis-Riel	Lise Thériault	Martine Roux	Richard Campeau	Marlène Lessard	Raphaël Couture	Samuel Stohl (CC) Linda Sullivan (ML)	Lise Thériault; Anjou
Bourassa-Sauvé	Rita de Santis	Marianne Dessureault	Louis Pelletier	Will Prosper	Nancy Lavallée	Éric Guerra-Grenier Jr. (Green)	vacant
Bourget	Dave McMahon	Maka Kotto	Mario Bentrovato	Patrice Gagnon	Paolo Zambito	Gilbert Caron (Green) Jan Stohl (CC); Claude Brunelle (ML); Gaston Savard (PUN); Sylvie R. Tremblay (PI)	Maka Kotto
Crémazie	Eleni Bakopanos	Diane De Courcy	Carla El-Ghandour	André Frappier	Yanek Lauzière-Fillion	Yves Laporte (Green)	Lisette Lapointe
Gouin	Anson Duran	Nicolas Girard	Bernard Labadie	Françoise David		Sameer Muldeen (Green) Gilles Guibord (PUN)	Nicolas Girard
Hochelaga-Maisonneuve	Alexandre Farley	Carole Poirier	David Monette	Alexandre Leduc	André Lamy	Nicholas Kulak (Green) Jean-François Jetté (CC); Christine Dandenault (ML); Serge Provost (PI); Denis Poulin (PN)	Carole Poirier
Jeanne-Mance–Viger	Filomena Rotiroti	Nicolas Bonami	Jean-François Gagné	Marie-Chantal Locas	Julie Surprenant	Garnet Colly (ML)	Filomena Rotiroti
LaFontaine	Marc Tanguay	Marc Boulerice	Domenico Cavaliere	Christine Filiatrault	Maxime St-Arnault	Gaëtan Bérard (Green) Patrice Raza (PC); Steven Hombrados (QCU)	Marc Tanguay
Laurier-Dorion	Gerry Sklavounos 10,987 34.08%	Badiona Bazin 8,524 26.44%	Marie Josée Godbout 3,154 9.78%	Andrés Fontecilla 7,844 24.33%	Miguel Tremblay 912 2.83%	Danny Polifroni (Green) 480 1.49% Yves Pageau (CC) 66 0.20% Peter Macrisopoulos (ML) 100 0.31% David H. Cherniak (Ind.) 119 0.37% Michel Dugré (Ind./nd) 50 0.16%	Gerry Sklavounos
Mercier	Anne Pâquet	Jean Poirier	Julie Boncompain	Amir Khadir	Nicolas Payne	David Kovacs (Green)	Amir Khadir
Pointe-aux-Trembles	Jessica Cialdella	Nicole Léger	Guy Boutin	Natacha Larocque	Guillaume Simard L'Heureux	Geneviève Royer (ML) Gérald Briand (PI); Jean-Marcel Seck (Ind.)	Nicole Léger
Rosemont	Madwa-Nika Phanord-Cadet	Jean-François Lisée	Léo Fradette	François Saillant	Johanne Lavoie	Daniel Guersan (CC) Stéphane Chénier (ML); Raynald St-Onge (BP)	Louise Beaudoin
Sainte-Marie–Saint-Jacques	Étienne Collins	Daniel Breton	Cédrick Beauregard	Manon Massé	Denis Monière	Serge Lachapelle (ML) Edson Emilio (QCU); Louis Provencher (PCM); Jean-Marc Labrèche (Ind.); Dimitri Mourkes (Ind.)	Martin Lemay
Viau	Emmanuel Dubourg	Gabriel Arbieto Munayco	Walid Hadid	Geneviève Fortier-Moreau	Simon-Pierre Bélanger	Eric Perreault-Chamberland (Green)	Emmanuel Dubourg

==== West ====
Electoral district	Candidates						Incumbent
Electoral district	Liberal	PQ	CAQ	QS	ON	Other	Incumbent
Acadie	Christine St-Pierre	Rachid Bandou	Abel-Claude Arslanian	Marianne Breton-Fontaine	Sébastien Croteau		Christine St-Pierre
D'Arcy-McGee	Lawrence Bergman	Guy Amyot	Sophie Leroux	Émilie Beauchesne		Abraham Weizfeld (Ind.)	Lawrence Bergman
Jacques-Cartier	Geoffrey Kelley	Olivier Gendreau	Paola L. Hawa	François-Xavier Charlebois	Raphael Hébert	Alex Tyrrell (Green) Ágnes Mina Barti (QCU); Francis Juneau (Ind.)	Geoffrey Kelley
Marguerite-Bourgeoys	Robert Poëti	Jessica Riggi	Michel Delisle	Yebo Romaric Okou	Véronique Pelletier	Yves Le Seigle (ML)	Clément Gignac
Marquette	François Ouimet	Étienne Gougoux	Victor A. Tan	Claudelle Cyr	Patrick Valois	John Symon (Green)	François Ouimet
Mont-Royal	Pierre Arcand	André Normandeau	Stefan Stanczykowski	Marc-André Beauchamp	Guillaume Blanchet	Ken McMurray (Green) Amal Bouchentouf (CC); Diane Johnston (ML)	Pierre Arcand
Nelligan	Yolande James	Marcos Archambault	Philippe Boileau	Elahé Machouf	François Landry	Kristianne Brunet (Green) Jean-Dominic Lévesque-René (QCU)	Yolande James
Notre-Dame-de-Grâce	Kathleen Weil	Olivier Sirard	Angely Pacis	David Mandel	Sylvain Labranche	Claude Sabourin (Green) Rachel Hoffman (ML)	Kathleen Weil
Outremont	Raymond Bachand	Roxanne Gendron	Claude Michaud	Édith Laperle	Luc Séguin	Olga Sharonova (CC) Jonathan Moffatt (QCU); Mathieu Marcil (PN)	Raymond Bachand
Robert-Baldwin	Pierre Marsan	Alexandre Pagé-Chassé	Toni Rinow	Sarah Landry	Sophie Turcot	Mathieu Mireault (Green) Fredrick-Anthony Ghali (QCU)	Pierre Marsan
Saint-Henri–Sainte-Anne	Marguerite Blais	Sophie Stanké	Joakim Beaupré	Nicolas Boisclair	Luc Lefebvre	Andrzej Jastrzebski (PUN)	Marguerite Blais
Saint-Laurent	Jean-Marc Fournier	Roger Gagnon	George Manolikakis	Marie Josèphe Pigeon	Maxime Bellerose	Pierre Etienne Loignon (Green) Fernand Deschamps (ML); Brian Jenkins (PUN)	Jean-Marc Fournier
Verdun	Henri-François Gautrin	Thierry St-Cyr	André Besner	Chantale Michaud	Marc-Antoine Daneau	Jeffrey Mackie (Green) Eileen Studd (ML); Philippe Refghi (QCU)	Henri-François Gautrin
Westmount–Saint-Louis	Jacques Chagnon	Marc-André Bahl	Johnny Kairouz	Mélissa Desjardins	Benoît Guérin	Lisa Julie Cahn (Green) Pierre JC Allard (Ind./nd)	Jacques Chagnon

=== (7) Outaouais ===
Electoral district	Candidates						Incumbent
Electoral district	Liberal	PQ	CAQ	QS	ON	Other	Incumbent
Chapleau	Marc Carrière	Yves Morin	Luc Angers	Benoit Renaud	Eid Harb	Jonathan Meijer (Green) Pierre Soublière (ML)	Marc Carrière
Gatineau	Stéphanie Vallée	Maude Tremblay	Michel Halloran	Francis Da Silva-Casimiro	Nicolas Lepage	Brandon Bolduc (Green) Yvon Breton (ML)	Stéphanie Vallée
Hull	Maryse Gaudreault	Gilles Aubé	Étienne Boulrice	Bill Clennett	Mikaël St-Louis	Jozyam Ilsa Fontaine (Green) Gabriel Girard Bernier (ML); Kamal Maghri (QCU); Marc Fiset (PN)	Maryse Gaudreault
Papineau	Alexandre Iracà	Jean-François Primeau	Chantal Dubé	Katia Gagnon	Jonathan Beauchamp	Alexandre Deschênes (ML) Christine Gagné (PN); Mario Parent (Ind.)	Norman MacMillan
Pontiac	Charlotte L'Écuyer	Geneviève Gendron-Nadeau	André Laframboise	Charmain Levy	Patrick Émard	Garry Bélair (Green) Louis Lang (ML)	Charlotte L'Écuyer

=== (8) Abitibi-Témiscamingue and (10) Nord-du-Québec ===
Electoral district	Candidates						Incumbent
Electoral district	Liberal	PQ	CAQ	QS	ON	Other	Incumbent
Abitibi-Est	Pierre Corbeil 7,653	Élizabeth Larouche 8,430	Samuel Dupras 4,059	Sarah Charbonneau-Beaulieu 1,047	Richard Trudel 452	Yvette Poucachiche (Green) 316	Pierre Corbeil
Abitibi-Ouest	Claude Nelson Morin 4,399	François Gendron 12,066	Sébastien D'Astous 4,759	Ghislaine Camirand 1,260	Grégory Vézeau 997		François Gendron
Rouyn-Noranda–Témiscamingue	Melissa Turgeon 7,983	Gilles Chapadeau 11,082	Bernard Flebus 7,140	Guy Leclerc 2,941	Sébastien-L. Pageon 534	Robert Bertrand (Green) 451	Daniel Bernard

Electoral district	Candidates						Incumbent
Electoral district	Liberal	PQ	CAQ	QS	ON	Other	Incumbent
Ungava	Gérald Lemoyne 3,701	Luc Ferland 4,854	Stéphane Robichaud 1,176	Sylvain Couture 655	Dominic Hamelin-Johnston 277		Luc Ferland

=== (12) Chaudière-Appalaches and (17) Centre-du-Québec ===
Electoral district	Candidates						Incumbent
Electoral district	Liberal	PQ	CAQ	QS	ON	Other	Incumbent
Arthabaska	Claude Bachand	Lucie LeBrun	Sylvie Roy	Christine Letendre	Rémi Marineau	François Fillion (Green) Eric Lafontaine (QCU); Jean Landry (Ind.)	Claude Bachand
Beauce-Nord	Jack Roy	Daniel Bizier	André Spénard	Yv Bonnier Viger	Stéphane Trudel	Gwendoline Mathieu-Poulin (Green) Danielle Favreau (CC); Sébastien Drouin (PC); Benoît Roy (Ind.)	Janvier Grondin
Beauce-Sud	Robert Dutil	Luc Villeneuve	Richard Savoie	Marie-Claude Verville	Vanessa Roy	Robert Genesse (QRD) Jean Rhéaume (Ind.)	Robert Dutil
Bellechasse	Dominique Vien	Clément Pouliot	Christian Lévesque	Benoit Comeau		Linda Beaudoin (PC) Sébastien Ruel (ÉA); Christine Lavoie (PUN); Patrice Aubin (PCM)	Dominique Vien
Chutes-de-la-Chaudière	Réal St-Laurent	Daniel Lachance	Marc Picard	Eveline Gueppe		Marielle Parent (Green) Renaud Grégoire (PC)	Marc Picard
Drummond–Bois-Francs	Marie Désilets	Annie Jean	Sébastien Schneeberger	Francis Soulard	Martin Allard	François Picard (PC) Robert Dufour (PUN); Pierre Hébert (Ind.)	Yves-François Blanchet; Drummond
Johnson	Nancy Boyce	Yves-François Blanchet	Stéphane Legault	Julie Dionne	Steve Lemay	Benoit Lussier (PC)	Étienne-Alexis Boucher
Lévis	Gilles Lehouillier	Stéphane Labrie	Christian Dubé	Valérie Guilloteau	Nathaly Dufour	Luc Harvey (PC) Carl Michaud (ÉA); Paul Biron (PUN); Patrick Vallières (PCM); Yvan Rodrigue (PÉ)	Gilles Lehouillier
Lotbinière-Frontenac	Laurent Lessard	Kaven Mathieu	Martin Caron	Marie-Christine Rochefort			Sylvie Roy; Lotbinière
Lotbinière-Frontenac	Laurent Lessard	Kaven Mathieu	Martin Caron	Marie-Christine Rochefort			merged district
Lotbinière-Frontenac	Laurent Lessard	Kaven Mathieu	Martin Caron	Marie-Christine Rochefort			Laurent Lessard; Frontenac
Nicolet-Bécancour	Marc Descôteaux	Gilles Mayrand	Donald Martel	none	Jean-Martin Aussant	Mathieu Benoit (PC)	Jean-Martin Aussant; Nicolet-Yamaska

=== (13) Laval ===
Electoral district	Candidates						Incumbent
Electoral district	Liberal	PQ	CAQ	QS	ON	Other	Incumbent
Chomedey	Guy Ouellette	Jean Cooke	Marielle Potvin	Francine Bellerose	Patrick Simard	Stéphanie Stevenson (Green) Kamal Germanos Lutfi (Ind.)	Guy Ouellette
Fabre	Gilles Ouimet	François-Gycelain Rocque	Dominique Anglade	Wilfried Cordeau	Bruno Forget	Jean-François Lepage (Green) Philippe Mayrand (Ind.)	Michelle Courchesne
Laval-des-Rapides	Alain Paquet	Léo Bureau-Blouin	Maud Cohen	Sylvie Des Rochers	Lawrence Côté-Collins	Carl Desmarais (Green) Monique Chartrand (CC)	Alain Paquet
Mille-Îles	Francine Charbonneau	Robert Carrier	Jean Prud’homme	Nicole Bellerose	Alain Sénécal	Henrico Negro (Green) Carlos Silva (QCU); Régent Millette (Ind.)	Francine Charbonneau
Sainte-Rose	Geneviève April	Suzanne Proulx	François Gaudreau	Nicolas Chatel-Launay	Sylvain Fortin	Ioan-Adrian Hancu (Ind.)	new district
Vimont	Jean Rousselle	Linda Tousignant	Christopher Skeete	David Lanneville	Catherine Houbart	Alain Robert (PC) Jean-Marc Boyer (Ind.)	Vincent Auclair

=== (14) Lanaudière ===
Electoral district	Candidates						Incumbent
Electoral district	Liberal	PQ	CAQ	QS	ON	Other	Incumbent
Berthier	Catherine Haulard	André Villeneuve	François Benjamin	Louise Beaudry	Raymond Guay	Dany Ouellet (Green) Pierre Baril (CC)	André Villeneuve
Joliette	Pascal Beaupré	Véronique Hivon	Normand Masse	Flavie Trudel	Amélie Dolbec	Mikey Colangelo Lauzon (PC) Michel Thouin (QCU); Jean-Mathieu Desmarais (Ind.)	Véronique Hivon
L'Assomption	Lise Hébert	Lizabel Nitoi	François Legault	Sylvain Fournier	Evelyne Marcil	Christine Lebel (Green)	Scott McKay
Masson	Suzanne Rathé	Diane Hamelin	Christian Gauthier	Jacinthe Sabourin	Samuel Bergeron	Michel Paulette (Green) Adam Stohl (CC)	Guillaume Tremblay
Repentigny	Marc Thompson	Scott McKay	Chantal Longpré	Olivier Huard	Anne-Marie Labrosse		new district
Rousseau	Mario Racette	Nicolas Marceau	Laurence R. Fortin	François Lépine	Gilles Chapdelaine	André Matteau (PI) Robert Boucher (Ind.)	Nicolas Marceau
Terrebonne	Josée Gingras	Mathieu Traversy	Gaétan Barrette	Yan Smith	Marc-André Dénommée	Benoit Carignan (Green) Patrick Dubé (CC)	Mathieu Traversy

=== (15) Laurentides ===
Electoral district	Candidates						Incumbent
Electoral district	Liberal	PQ	CAQ	QS	ON	Other	Incumbent
Argenteuil	Lise Proulx	Roland Richer	Mario Laframboise	Yvan Zanetti	Patrick Sabourin	Stephen Matthews (Green)	Roland Richer
Bertrand	Yannick Ouellette	Claude Cousineau	Jean-Marc Lacoste	Lise Boivin	Samuelle Ducrocq-Henry	Marc Saint-Germain (Green) Patrick Dubé (CC)	Claude Cousineau
Blainville	Joao Neves	Bernard Généreux	Daniel Ratthé	Étienne Ferland	Christian Bélanger	Michel Sigouin (Green) Yan Bégin (PI)	Daniel Ratthé
Deux-Montagnes	Stéphanie Ménard	Daniel Goyer	Benoit Charette	Normand Godon	Wilson Ortiz	Princess Brooks (Green)	Benoit Charette
Groulx	Linda Lapointe	Raymond Archambault	Hélène Daneault	Sylvie Giguère	Alain Marginean	Alec Ware (Green) Alex Munteanu (Ind.)	René Gauvreau
Labelle	Vicki Emard	Sylvain Pagé	Robert Milot	Normand St-Amour	Simon Marcil	François Beauchamp (Green)	Sylvain Pagé
Mirabel	Ismaël Boisvert	Denise Beaudoin	Sylvie D'Amours	Mylène Jaccoud	Jean-François Pouliot	Eric Emond (Ind.)	Denise Beaudoin
Saint-Jérôme	Marc Bustamante	Gilles Robert	Jacques Duchesneau	Vincent Lemay-Thivierge	Julien Benca	Olivier Adam (Green)	Gilles Robert; Prévost

=== (16) Montérégie ===
==== Eastern ====
Electoral district	Candidates						Incumbent
Electoral district	Liberal	PQ	CAQ	QS	ON	Other	Incumbent
Borduas	Conrad Deschênes	Pierre Duchesne	Emmanuelle Géhin	Jean-François Lessard	Martin Dulac	Mary Harper (Green) Michel Lepage (PI)	Pierre Curzi
Brome-Missisquoi	Pierre Paradis	Richard Leclerc	Benoit Legault	Benoit Van Caloen	Patrick Melchior	Louise Martineau (Green) Dominique Favreau (CC); Jacques Pipon (PC); Gilles Alarie (Ind.); Jean-Pierre Dufault (Ind.)	Pierre Paradis
Chambly	Julie Tremblay	Bertrand St-Arnaud	Martin Trudeau	Anne Poussard	Martin Laramée	Nicholas Lescarbeau (Green) Daniel Nicol (PC)	Bertrand St-Arnaud
Granby	Guy Gaudord	Luc Perron	François Bonnardel	Éric Bédard	Jocelyn Beaudoin	Francine St-Onge (CC) Stéphane Gagné (PC); Stéphane Deschamps (PN)	François Bonnardel; Shefford
Iberville	Alain Ménard	Marie Bouillé	Claire Samson	Myriam-Zaa Normandin	Claude Chagnon	Marie-France Allard (Green)	Marie Bouillé
Richelieu	Alain Plante	Élaine Zakaïb	Jean-Bernard Émond	Marie-Ève Mathieu	Michaël Rocheleau		Sylvain Simard
Saint-Hyacinthe	Louise Arpin	Émilien Pelletier	Pierre Schetagne	Richard Gingras	Jérôme Saint-Amand	Isabelle Leclerc (PC) Thomas Gagné (QCU); Alexandre Bruneau (ÉA); Lise Gaudette (PUN)	Émilien Pelletier
Saint-Jean	Martin Massé	Dave Turcotte	Yvan Berthelot	Carole Lusignan	Félix Lemaire	Carmyn Girard (PC) François Mailly (QCU); Yvon Sylva Aubé (PI)	Dave Turcotte
Verchères	Maxime St-Onge	Stéphane Bergeron	Chantal Soucy	Marie-Thérèse Toutant	Diane Massicotte	Mario Geoffrion (CC) Steven Terranova (Ind.)	Stéphane Bergeron

==== South Shore ====
Electoral district	Candidates						Incumbent
Electoral district	Liberal	PQ	CAQ	QS	ON	Other	Incumbent
Beauharnois	Lyse Lemieux	Guy Leclair	Michel Drouin	Pierre-Paul St-Onge	Jérémie Poupart Montpetit	Bruno Auclair (Green) Lynne Mimeault (PC); Matthieu Bonin (Ind.); Sylvain Larocque (Ind./nd)	Guy Leclair
Châteauguay	Pierre Moreau	Maryse Perreault	Denis Leftakis	Xavier P.-Laberge	Nicolas Dionne	Denis Côté (Green) Jean-Paul Pellerin (PC)	Pierre Moreau
Huntingdon	Stéphane Billette	Gaétan Arel	Claire IsaBelle	Carmen Labelle	Éric Paré	Nicholas Roach (Green) Antoine-Marie Bourdon (CC); Maxime Collette (PC); Steven Gomory (QCU)	Stéphane Billette
La Pinière	Fatima Houda-Pepin	Pierre O. Thibert	François Lemay	Johane Beaupré	Mylaine Larocque	Marc-André Beauchemin (Green) Claude Chalhoub (PC); Serge Patenaude (ML); Sean Connolly-Boutin (QCU)	Fatima Houda-Pepin
Laporte	Nicole Ménard	Simon Bélanger	Donald LeBlanc	Michèle St-Denis	Linda Dupuis	Camil Lambert (PC)	Nicole Ménard
La Prairie	Lucie F. Roussel	Pierre Langlois	Stéphane Le Bouyonnec	Yohan Perron	Jean-Pierre Gouin	Kevin Murphy (Green) Adrian Ahsly Gutierrez (CC); Monique Roy-Verville (PC); Normand Chouinard (ML)	François Rebello
Marie-Victorin	Farida Chemmakh	Bernard Drainville	Simon Jolin-Barrette	Carl Lévesque	Olivier Chauvin	Mathieu Yargeau (Green) Jean Baillargeon (CC); Yves Ménard (PI)	Bernard Drainville
Montarville	Nicole Girard	Monique Richard	Nathalie Roy	David Fortin Côté	Luc Lapierre-Pelletier	Dominique Robitaille (Green) Claude Leclair (PC)	Monique Richard; Marguerite-D'Youville
Sanguinet	Jocelyne Bates	Alain Therrien	François Rebello	Frédéric Nadeau	Keven Rousseau	André Martel (PC) Hélène Héroux (ML); Martin Mc Neil (Ind.)	new district
Soulanges	Lucie Charlebois	André Bouthillier	Mario Gagnier	Andrée Bessette	Frédéric Roy	Patricia Domingos (Ind.)	Lucie Charlebois
Taillon	Marie-Ève Pelletier	Marie Malavoy	Pierre Cimoné	Manon Blanchard	Julien-Alexandre Bilodeau	Carole Mainville Bériault (Green) Marie-Noelle Mondoux-Lemoine (CC); Normand Fournier (ML); Robert Morin (Ind.)	Marie Malavoy
Vachon	Linda Langlois Saulnier	Martine Ouellet	Jean-François Roberge	Sébastien Robert	Sylvain Gauthier	Pierre-André Beauchemin (Green) Marc Joseph (CC)	Martine Ouellet
Vaudreuil	Yvon Marcoux	Kim Comeau	Martin Legault	Marc-André Pilon	Julien Bédard	Julien Leclerc (Green) Étienne Ouellet (QCU)	Yvon Marcoux

=== Summary analysis ===
Party candidates in 2nd place
Party in 1st place	Party in 2nd place					Total
Party in 1st place	PQ	PLQ	ADQ	QS	ON	Total
Parti Québécois		20	32	2		54
Liberal	29		21			50
Coalition Avenir Québec	8	10			1	19
Québec solidaire	2					2
Total	39	30	53	2	1	125

Candidates ranked 1st to 5th place, by party
Parties	1st	2nd	3rd	4th	5th
█ Parti Québécois	54	39	28	4	
█ Liberal	50	30	44	1	
█ Coalition Avenir Québec	19	53	48	5	
█ Québec solidaire	2	2	4	114	2
█ Option nationale		1			85
█ Green			1	1	32
█ Independent					2
█ Conservative					2
█ Parti de la classe moyenne					1

Resulting composition of the National Assembly (2008)
Source		Party				
Source		PQ	Lib	CAQ	QS	Total
Seats retained	Incumbents returned	31	42	4	1	78
Seats retained	Open seats held	8	6	1		15
Seats retained	Ouster of incumbent changing allegiance	1				1
Seats changing hands	Incumbents defeated	7		9	1	17
Seats changing hands	Open seats gained	2		4		6
Seats changing hands	Incumbents changing allegiance			1		1
Seats changing hands	Byelection gain held	1				1
New seats	Previous incumbents from other ridings	2	2			4
New seats	New MNAs	2				
Total		54	50	19	2	125

== See also ==
- 39th Quebec Legislature
- Politics of Quebec
- List of premiers of Quebec
- List of leaders of the Official Opposition (Quebec)
- National Assembly of Quebec
- Timeline of Quebec history
- Political parties in Quebec
- 2011 Canadian federal election in Quebec
