= Quebec Citizens' Union =

Canadian political party (2012–2015)

Quebec Citizens' Union Union citoyenne du Québec
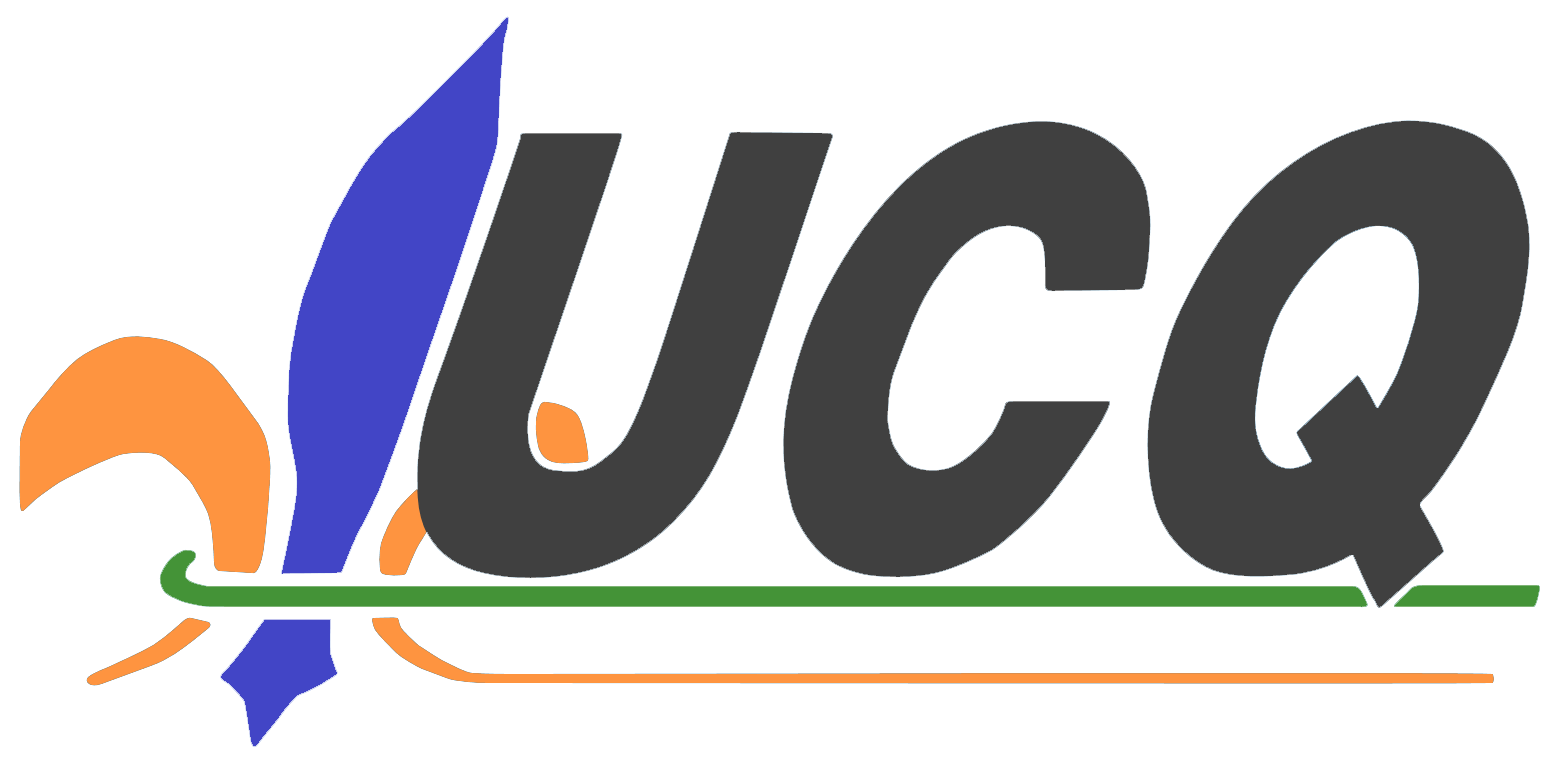
- President: Unknown
- Founded: July 13, 2012
- Dissolved: November 20, 2015
- Headquarters: 2373-4 Mathias street, Jonquière QC, G7S 5A4
- Ideology: Social democracy Canadian federalism Progressivism; Green politics
- Political position: Centre-left
- Colours: Orange, Blue
- Seats in the National Assembly: 0 / 125

Website
- www.ucquebec.org

The Quebec Citizens' Union (French: Union citoyenne du Québec, pronounced [ynjɔ̃ sitwajɛn dy kebɛk], UCQ) was a social-democratic, progressive and federalist political party in Québec, Canada, that was officially recognized on July 13, 2012, in Quebec.

== History ==
The Quebec Citizens' Union was founded in the fall of 2011, when about a dozen people left the Jonquière Liberal Association with its resigning president, Alexis St-Gelais, to form a party that would appeal to progressive, federalist voters. The party's name was reserved on December 14, 2011, but it was not until February 2012 that it started appearing in various social media outlets. Social media has since become crucial to the party, becoming its primary means of campaigning.

The party was recognized by the Chief Electoral Officer of Québec on July 13, 2012.

On August 4, 2012, the UCQ published its manifesto and slogan, Finally!, for the 2012 provincial election. The UCQ nominated 20 candidates for the election, who won a total of 2,089 votes. A translated English version was published on August 24, 2012.

In the 2014 provincial election, the party nominated one candidate, who won 58 votes.

On November 20, 2015, the UCQ announced on Twitter that the party was closing.
