= Citoyens au pouvoir du Québec =

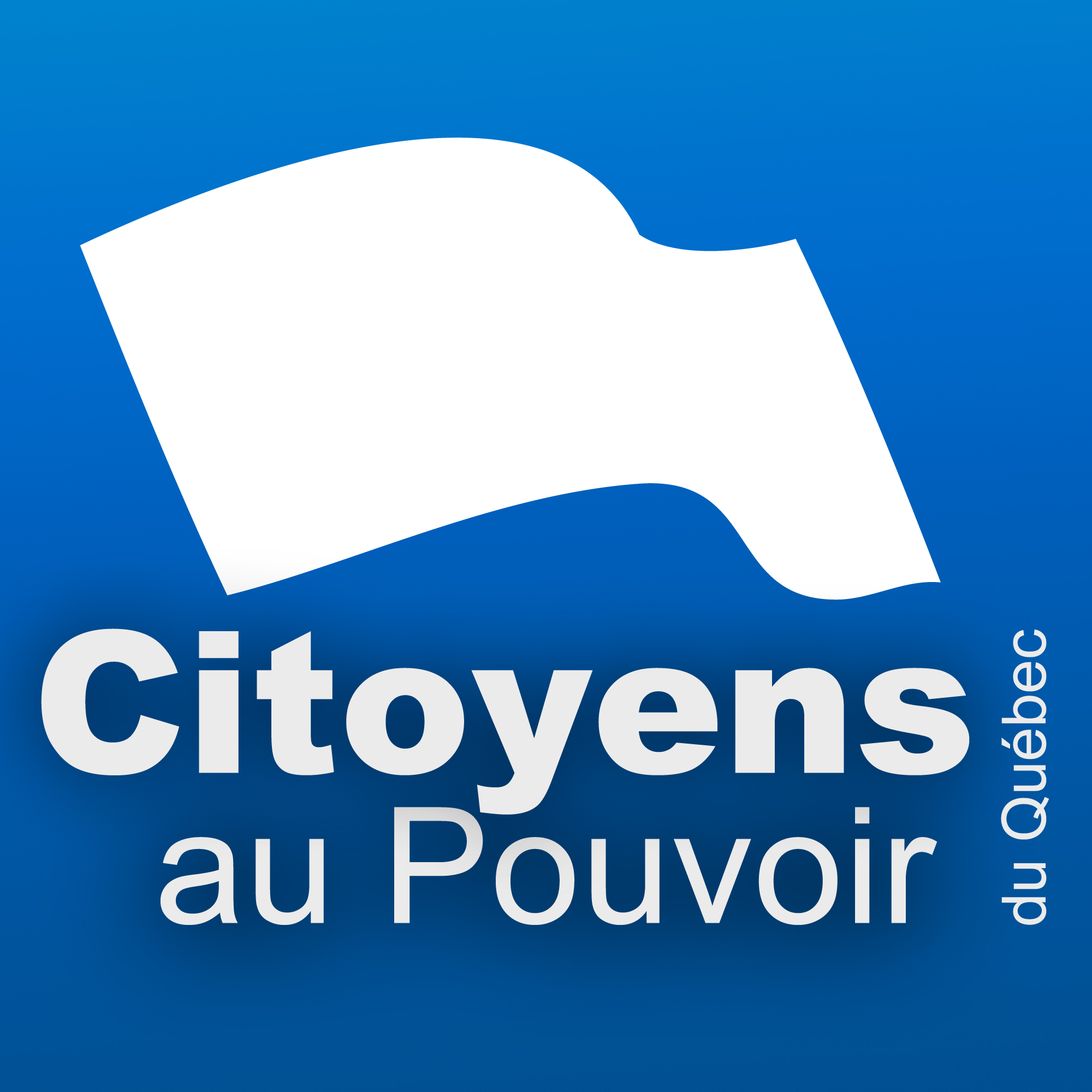
- Leader: Stéphane Lévesque (interim)
- Founded: 2011
- Headquarters: 2500, rue Jean-Perrin, bureau 201; Québec (Québec); G2C 1X1
- Ideology: Direct democracy Anti-public health measures

Website
- www.citoyensaupouvoir.ca

Citoyens au pouvoir du Québec (French pronunciation: [sitwajɛ̃ o puvwaʁ dy kebɛk]; English: Citizens in Power of Quebec) is a minor political party in the Canadian province of Quebec. The Party gave its support to the Anti-mask movement during the COVID-19 pandemic and was accused of having ties with far-right group La Meute.

== Platform ==
The main policy point in the party's platform is the creation of a constituent assembly via random draw which will help "give freedom to citizens to decide on the type of society, state and government they want". They advocate for elected deputy's duty to consult their fellow citizens and vote according to their constituency's opinions instead of their party line. The party proposes the establishment of direct democracy, through referendums initiated by the citizens, on the model in use in Switzerland.

== History ==
The party was founded in 2011 under the name Coalition pour la constituante (Coalition for a constituent assembly) when the Mouvement des Sans-Parti issued its manifesto, signed by over 500 supporters. It became officially registered under the Election Act in June 2012 and it first ran candidates in the September 2012 election. The party changed its name in 2013 to Parti des sans parti (Party of people without a party), then in 2015 to Sans parti – Citoyens constituants (Without a party - Constituent citizens) and again in 2016 to its present name, Citoyens au pouvoir du Québec (Citizens in power of Quebec). A renewed registration was issued by the Chief Electoral Officer in 2019. Although the party has a leader as required by the Election Act, its direct democracy used to render this role obsolete and it used spokespersons instead and its candidates were called mandataries. In 2019, it adopted a more standard model with leader and candidates.

Under the leadership of Stéphane Blais, the party took positions opposing health measures aimed at combatting the COVID-19 pandemic in Quebec, and has been accused of promoting COVID-19 misinformation in Canada.

In May 2021, Blais resigned as party leader and Stéphane Lévesque was named interim leader. In October 2021, Lévesque announced he was discussing with party members the future of the party. Lévesque provided party membership with three options: the continued survival of the party, merging with an existing party, or the dissolution of the party.

== Spokespersons ==
- Marc Fafard, June 2012–September 2012
- Daniel Guersan, 2012–2013
- Frank Malenfant, 2013–2016
- Bernard Gauthier, 2016–2017
- Stéphane Blais, 2018–2021

== Election results ==
General election	Name	# of candidates	# of elected candidates	Popular vote	% of popular vote
2012	Coalition pour la constituante	29	0	5,197	0.12%
2014	Parti des sans parti	5	0	1,291	0.03%
2018	Citoyens au pouvoir du Québec	56	0	13,768	0.35%

== See also ==
- List of political parties in Quebec
