= Nathalie Roy =

Canadian politician

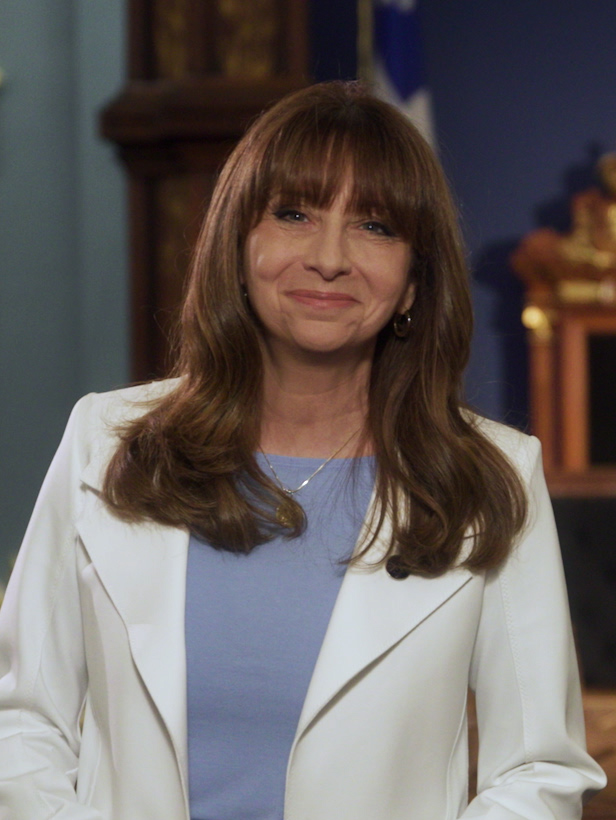
- Roy in 2024

47th President of the National Assembly of Quebec
- In office November 29, 2022 – October 5, 2026
- Preceded by: François Paradis
- Succeeded by: To be elected

Minister of Culture and Communications
- In office October 18, 2018 – October 20, 2022
- Preceded by: Marie Montpetit
- Succeeded by: Mathieu Lacombe

Member of the National Assembly for Montarville
- In office September 4, 2012 – October 5, 2026
- Preceded by: Monique Richard (for Marguerite-D'Youville)
- Succeeded by: Mathieu Lavoie

Personal details
- Born: 8 May 1964 (age 62) New Carlisle, Quebec, Canada
- Party: Coalition Avenir Québec
- Profession: Lawyer; news anchor
- Cabinet: Ministry of Culture and Communications (Quebec)

Nathalie Roy (born May 8, 1964) is a Canadian politician. She was a member of the National Assembly of Quebec for the riding of Montarville, first elected in the 2012 election. From 2018 to 2022 she served as minister of Culture and Communications. Prior to her election, Roy served as a journalist and news anchor with TVA Nouvelles.

In August 2016, Roy came out as against Burkini and Hijab, saying these are accessories of Radical Islam.

In August 2019, as minister of Culture and Communications, Roy announced the allocation of CA$15 million to preserve the cultural heritage that the churches of Quebec embody, and CA$5 million for the requalification of places of worship.

Following the 2022 Quebec general election, she was re-elected in her riding of Montarville. In the first session of the 43rd legislature, she was elected by her fellow members to the position of President of the National Assembly (or speaker). She became the second woman to serve as president of the national assembly after Louise Harel in 2002.

In the 2026 Quebec general election, Roy was unseated by Mathieu Lavoie from the Quebec Liberal Party (PLQ).

== Electoral record ==
2026 Quebec general election: Montarville
The 2026 general election will be held on October 5.
Party	Candidate	Votes	%	±%
Liberal	Mathieu Lavoie	12,775	29.62	
Parti Québécois	Jean-François Cloutier	12,439	28.84	
Coalition Avenir Québec	Nathalie Roy	8,594	19.93	
Québec solidaire	Ginette Langlois	5,046	11.70	
Conservative	Marc Rondeau	3,677	8.53	
Climat Québec	Jean-Simon Bellavance	303	0.70	
Independent	Sylvain Bouchard	188	0.44	
Présence	Annie St-Jacques	105	0.24	
Total valid votes				
Total rejected ballots				
Turnout			80.74	
Electors on the lists				

2022 Quebec general election: Montarville
Party	Candidate	Votes	%	±%
Coalition Avenir Québec	Nathalie Roy	19,045	45.90%	+4.79
Parti Québécois	Daniel Michelin	7,753	18.69%	+2.55
Québec solidaire	Marie-Christine Veilleux	6,741	16.25%	+0.35
Liberal	Lucie Gagnon	5,090	12.27%	-12.10
Conservative	Evans Henry	2,124	5.12%	+5.12
Green	Jeanne Dufour	601	1.45	+.145
Climat Québec	Isadora Lamouche	134	0.32	+0.32
Total valid votes		41,488	–	
Total rejected ballots			–	
Turnout				
Electors on the lists			–	–

2018 Quebec general election: Montarville
Party	Candidate	Votes	%	±%
Coalition Avenir Québec	Nathalie Roy	17,368	41.11	+6.07
Liberal	Ludovic Grisé Farand	10,298	24.37	-6.92
Parti Québécois	Daniel Michelin	6,820	16.14	-10.18
Québec solidaire	Caroline Charette	6,716	15.9	+9.25
New Democratic	Lise Roy	836	1.98	
Bloc Pot	Jean Dury	214	0.51	
Total valid votes		42,252	98.60	
Total rejected ballots		599	1.40	
Turnout		42,851	80.37	
Eligible voters		53,315		
Coalition Avenir Québec hold		Swing		+6.495
Source(s) "Rapport des résultats officiels du scrutin". Élections Québec.

2014 Quebec general election
Party	Candidate	Votes	%	±%
Coalition Avenir Québec	Nathalie Roy	14,999	35.04	-0.70
Liberal	Jacques Gendron	13,392	31.29	+6.80
Parti Québécois	Simon Prévost	11,268	26.32	-5.17
Québec solidaire	Jean Marc Ostiguy	2,845	6.65	+2.18
Option nationale	Anthony van Duyse	301	0.70	-1.25
Total valid votes		42,805	98.83	–
Total rejected ballots		505	1.17	–
Turnout		43,310	83.17	-4.49
Electors on the lists		52,071	–	–
Coalition Avenir Québec hold		Swing		-3.75

2012 Quebec general election
Party	Candidate	Votes	%	±%
Coalition Avenir Québec	Nathalie Roy	16,083	35.74	+19.96
Parti Québécois	Monique Richard	14,175	31.50	-4.56
Liberal	Nicole Girard	11,020	24.49	-16.90
Québec solidaire	David Fortin Côté	2,010	4.47	+1.22
Option nationale	Luc Lapierre-Pelletier	877	1.95	–
Green	Dominique Robitaille	633	1.41	-1.80
Conservative	Claude Leclair	205	0.46	–
Total valid votes		45,003	99.16	–
Total rejected ballots		381	0.84	–
Turnout		45,384	87.66	
Electors on the lists		51,772	–	–
Coalition Avenir Québec notional gain from Liberal		Swing		+18.43

Quebec provincial government of François Legault
Cabinet post (1)
Predecessor	Office	Successor
Marie Montpetit	Minister of Culture, Communication and the French Language; 18 October 2018 - October 20, 2022	Mathieu Lacombe
