= Montarville (provincial electoral district) =

Provincial electoral district in Quebec, Canada

Coordinates: 45°32′N 73°20′W

Quebec electoral district
- Location in Longueuil

Provincial electoral district
- Legislature: National Assembly of Quebec
MNA
Mathieu Lavoie
Liberal
- District created: 2011
- First contested: 2012
- Last contested: 2026

Demographics
- Population (2011): 66,860
- Electors (2012): 51,710
- Area (km²): 123.8
- Pop. density (per km²): 540.1
- Census division: Longueuil (part)
- Census subdivision(s): Boucherville, Saint-Bruno-de-Montarville

Montarville (French pronunciation: [mɔ̃taʁvil]) is a provincial electoral district in the Montérégie region of Quebec, Canada, that elects members to the National Assembly of Quebec. It consists of the municipalities of Boucherville and Saint-Bruno-de-Montarville, both of which are part of the urban agglomeration of Longueuil.

It was created for the 2012 election from parts of the Marguerite-D'Youville and Chambly electoral districts.

Marguerite-D'Youville, which ceased to exist, consisted of Boucherville and Sainte-Julie. To create Montarville, Sainte-Julie was moved to the Verchères electoral district and Saint-Bruno-de-Montarville was taken from Chambly.

== Members of the National Assembly ==
Legislature	Years	Member	Party
Riding created from Marguerite-D'Youville and Chambly
40th	2012–2014	Nathalie Roy	Coalition Avenir Québec
41st	2014–2018	Nathalie Roy	Coalition Avenir Québec
42nd	2018–2022	Nathalie Roy	Coalition Avenir Québec
43rd	2022–2026	Nathalie Roy	Coalition Avenir Québec
44th	2026–Present	Mathieu Lavoie	Liberal

== Election results ==
Template:2026 Quebec general election/Montarville

2022 Quebec general election
Party	Candidate	Votes	%	±%
Coalition Avenir Québec	Nathalie Roy	19,045	45.90%	+4.79
Parti Québécois	Daniel Michelin	7,753	18.69%	+2.55
Québec solidaire	Marie-Christine Veilleux	6,741	16.25%	+0.35
Liberal	Lucie Gagnon	5,090	12.27%	-12.10
Conservative	Evans Henry	2,124	5.12%	+5.12
Green	Jeanne Dufour	601	1.45	+.145
Climat Québec	Isadora Lamouche	134	0.32	+0.32
Total valid votes		41,488	–	
Total rejected ballots			–	
Turnout				
Electors on the lists			–	–

2018 Quebec general election
Party	Candidate	Votes	%	±%
Coalition Avenir Québec	Nathalie Roy	17,368	41.11	+6.07
Liberal	Ludovic Grisé Farand	10,298	24.37	-6.92
Parti Québécois	Daniel Michelin	6,820	16.14	-10.18
Québec solidaire	Caroline Charette	6,716	15.9	+9.25
New Democratic	Lise Roy	836	1.98	
Bloc Pot	Jean Dury	214	0.51	
Total valid votes		42,252	98.60	
Total rejected ballots		599	1.40	
Turnout		42,851	80.37	
Eligible voters		53,315		
Coalition Avenir Québec hold		Swing		+6.495
Source(s) "Rapport des résultats officiels du scrutin". Élections Québec.

2014 Quebec general election
Party	Candidate	Votes	%	±%
Coalition Avenir Québec	Nathalie Roy	14,999	35.04	-0.70
Liberal	Jacques Gendron	13,392	31.29	+6.80
Parti Québécois	Simon Prévost	11,268	26.32	-5.17
Québec solidaire	Jean Marc Ostiguy	2,845	6.65	+2.18
Option nationale	Anthony van Duyse	301	0.70	-1.25
Total valid votes		42,805	98.83	–
Total rejected ballots		505	1.17	–
Turnout		43,310	83.17	-4.49
Electors on the lists		52,071	–	–
Coalition Avenir Québec hold		Swing		-3.75

2012 Quebec general election
Party	Candidate	Votes	%	±%
Coalition Avenir Québec	Nathalie Roy	16,083	35.74	+19.96
Parti Québécois	Monique Richard	14,175	31.50	-4.56
Liberal	Nicole Girard	11,020	24.49	-16.90
Québec solidaire	David Fortin Côté	2,010	4.47	+1.22
Option nationale	Luc Lapierre-Pelletier	877	1.95	–
Green	Dominique Robitaille	633	1.41	-1.80
Conservative	Claude Leclair	205	0.46	–
Total valid votes		45,003	99.16	–
Total rejected ballots		381	0.84	–
Turnout		45,384	87.66	
Electors on the lists		51,772	–	–
Coalition Avenir Québec notional gain from Liberal		Swing		+18.43

^ Change based on redistributed results. CAQ change from ADQ.

== See also ==
- List of Quebec provincial electoral districts
- Canadian provincial electoral districts
