= 2008 Quebec general election =

Canadian provincial election

- December 8, 2008

125 seats in the National Assembly of Quebec 63 seats needed for a majority
- Turnout: 57.43% (▼13.8%)
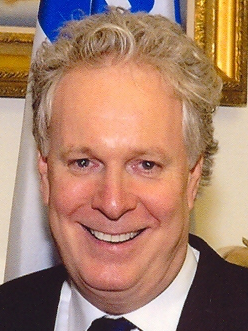

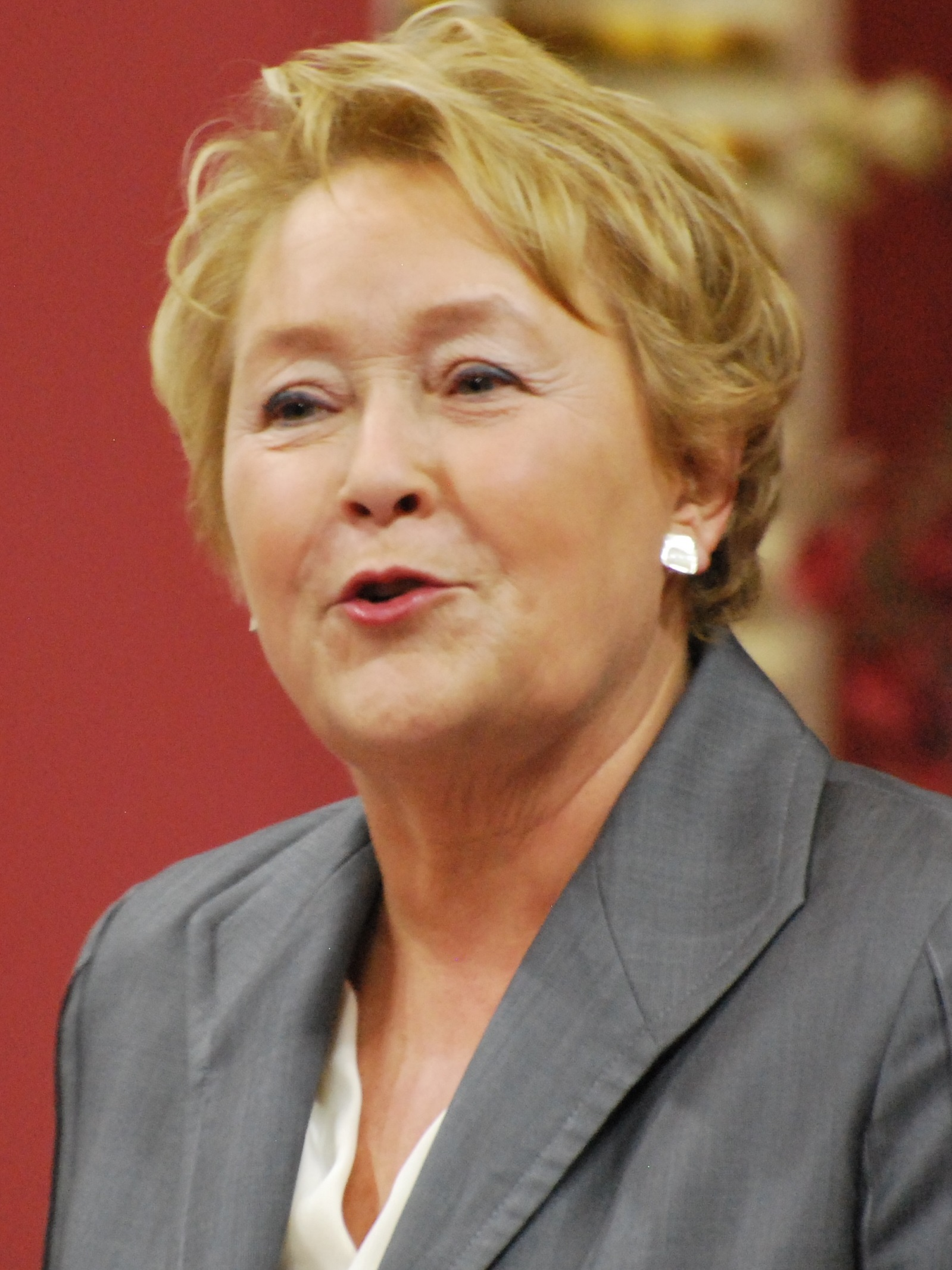

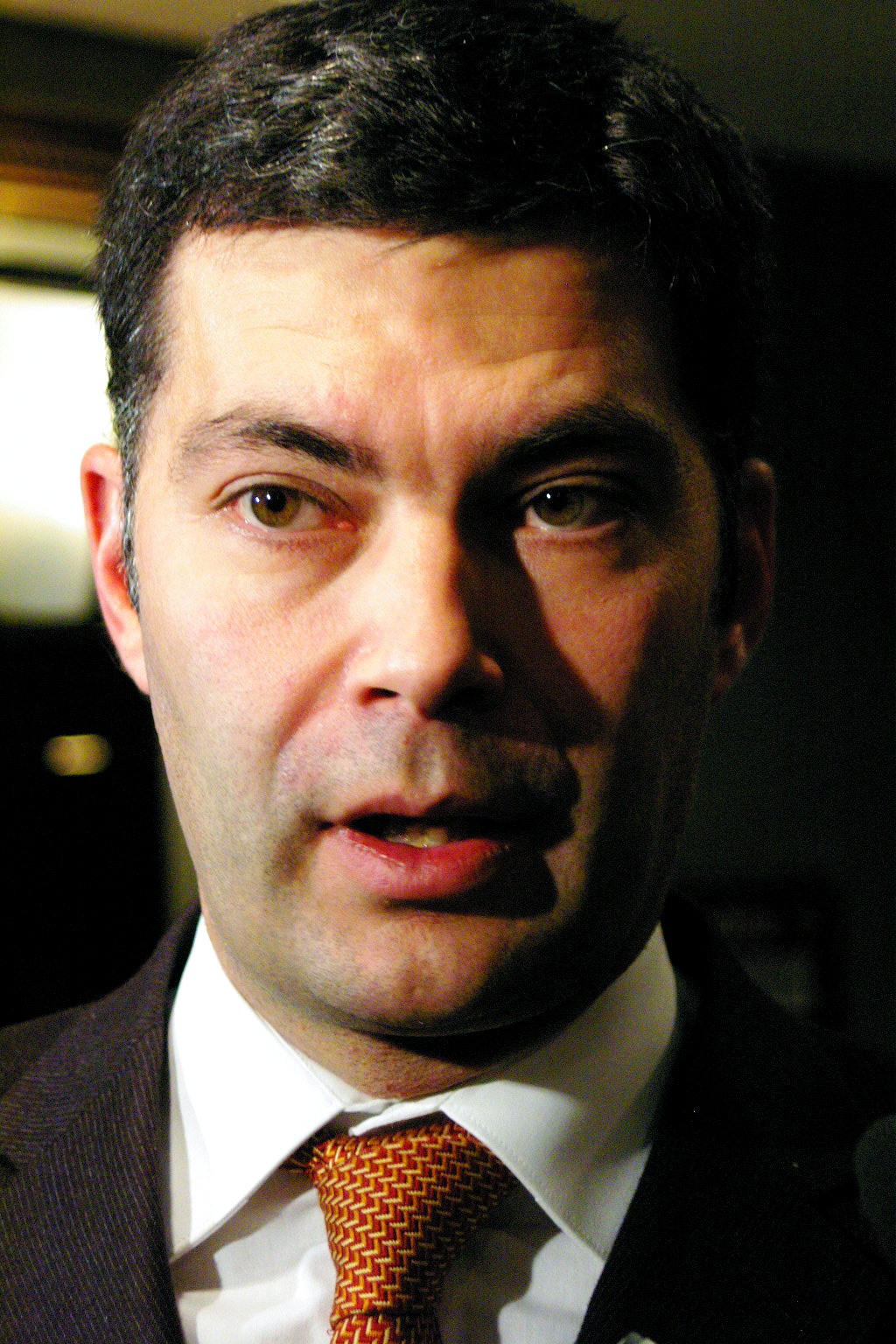

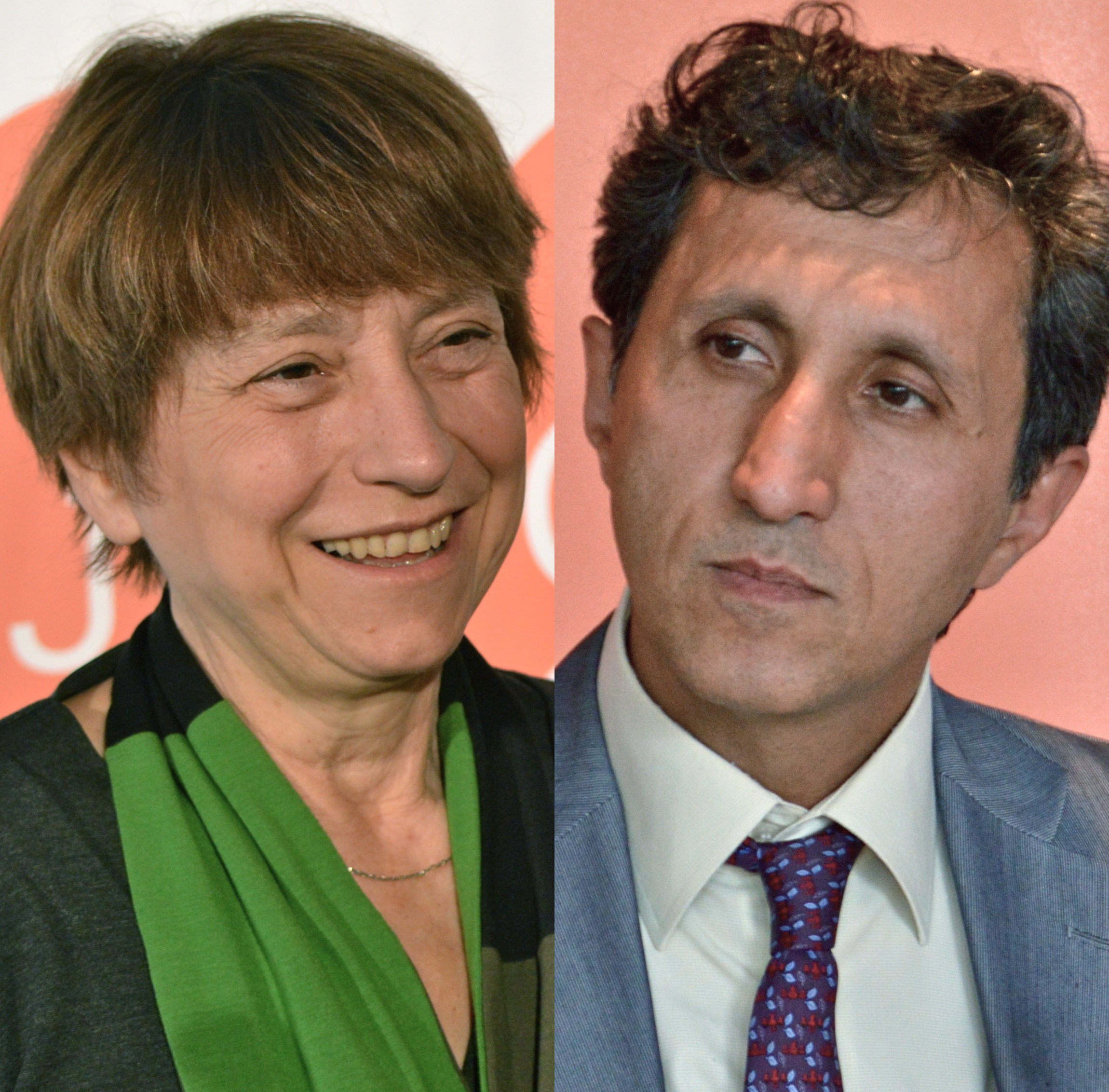
	Majority party	Minority party
Leader	Jean Charest	Pauline Marois
Party	Liberal	Parti Québécois
Leader since	April 30, 1998	June 26, 2007
Leader's seat	Sherbrooke	Charlevoix
Last election	48 seats, 33.08%	36 seats, 28.35%
Seats won	66	51
Seat change	▲18	▲15
Popular vote	1,366,046	1,139,185
Percentage	42.08%	35.17%
Swing	▲9.00%	▲6.82%
	Third party	Fourth party
Leader	Mario Dumont	Françoise David and Amir Khadir (as spokespeople)
Party	Action démocratique	Québec solidaire
Leader since	May 11, 1994	February 4, 2006
Leader's seat	Rivière-du-Loup	David: Ran in Gouin (lost) Khadir: Mercier
Last election	41 seats, 30.84%	0 seats, 3.64%
Seats won	7	1
Seat change	▼34	▲1
Popular vote	529,925	123,061
Percentage	16.37%	3.78%
Swing	▼14.47%	▲0.14%
- Popular vote by riding. As this is an FPTP election, seat totals are not determined by popular vote, but instead via results by each riding. Click the map for more details.
Premier before election
Jean Charest
Liberal
Premier after election
Jean Charest
Liberal

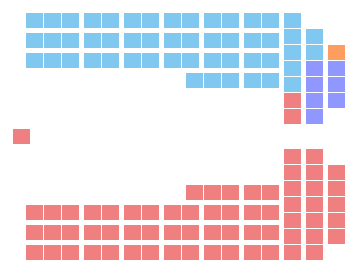
Seating plan following the election.

The 2008 Quebec general election was held in the Canadian province of Quebec on December 8, 2008. The Quebec Liberal Party, under incumbent Premier Jean Charest, was re-elected with a majority government, marking the first time since the 1950s (when the Union Nationale of Maurice Duplessis won four consecutive elections) that a party or leader was elected to a third consecutive mandate, and the first time for the Liberals since the 1930s, when Louis-Alexandre Taschereau was Premier.

The 2008 election also marked the first time that Québec solidaire won a seat.

== Issues ==
Charest called the election on November 5, saying he needed a "clear mandate" and a majority to handle the economic storm. He was criticized, however, by the Parti Québécois and the Action démocratique du Québec for calling a snap election to get a majority when they were willing to work with him to fix the economy.

Most notably, the election was marked by a significant collapse in support for the ADQ. Formerly a relatively minor party, the ADQ had attracted significant protest support in the 2007 election, beating the Parti Québécois to Official Opposition status. In 2008, however, the party's support dropped back to approximately 15 per cent of the popular vote, roughly the same range of support the party attracted before 2007. As a result of this loss of support, Mario Dumont announced in his concession speech that he would step down as party leader.

In the final days of the election campaign, the concurrent parliamentary confidence dispute became an issue, with Prime Minister Stephen Harper attacking the credibility of a potential Liberal-New Democratic Party coalition government because the Bloc Québécois had pledged to support the coalition on motions of confidence. Both Marois and Dumont called upon Charest, a former leader of the federal Progressive Conservatives, to clarify where he stood on the coalition and on Harper's use of anti-sovereigntist rhetoric in the dispute. Charest emphasized that the Bloc MPs had been legitimately elected by Quebecers, and stated that "I live in a society in which people can be sovereigntists or federalists, but they respect each other. The same thing should prevail in the federal parliament."

Media analysts noted that while Charest's Liberals won a majority, the final result was much narrower in both the popular vote and the seat total than polls even just a few days before the election had predicted, because the Liberals only won an eight-seat majority, a result which was widely credited to a late voter swing toward the PQ as a result of Harper's comments.

== Timeline ==
=== 2007 ===
- March 26 - 38th Quebec general election
- April 4 - Mario Dumont becomes the leader of the Official Opposition.
- April 5 - Swearing in of the liberals members of the National Assembly
- April 12 - Swearing in of the ADQs members of the National Assembly
- April 18 - Swearing in of the Cabinet members
- April 25 - Swearing in of the PQs members of the National Assembly
- May 8 - Resignation of André Boisclair as leader of the Parti Québécois
- May 9 - The opening speech of the 38th National Assembly of Quebec is pronounced by Premier Jean Charest.
- May 10 - François Gendron becomes the interim leader of the Parti Québécois, so the leader of the Second Opposition group.
- May 24 - The budget speech is pronounced by Monique Jérôme-Forget. Both opposition parties announce that they will vote against the budget, causing a crisis in the National Assembly.
- June 1 - Monique Jérôme-Forget adds 111 million dollars to the budget to avoid the holding of a general election. The budgetary policy is approved by 46 votes against 44.
- June 7 - Pierre Duchesne becomes the twenty-eighth Lieutenant Governor of Quebec.
- June 26 - Pauline Marois is elected as leader of the Parti Québécois without opposition.
- August 13 - Resignation of Rosaire Bertrand as MNA of Charlevoix
- September 24 - In a by-election, Pauline Marois is elected MNA of Charlevoix with 59.2% of the vote.
- October 17 - Resignation of Diane Lemieux as MNA of Bourget
- November 15 - Resignation of André Boisclair as MNA of Pointe-aux-Trembles

=== 2008 ===
- March 8 - 97.2% of the liberals delegates support their leader, Jean Charest.
- March 13 - Monique Jérôme-Forget pronounces her second budget speech. Mario Dumont announces that the ADQ will vote for the budget, whereas Pauline Marois announces that the PQ will vote against. Thus, the government is safe.
- March 16 - 94.8% of the ADQ's delegates support their leader, Mario Dumont.
- March 29 - Guy Rainville is elected as leader of the Green Party against Scott McKay.
- April 9 - Resignation of Roch Cholette as MNA of Hull
- May 12 - In by-elections, Maka Kotto, Maryse Gaudreault and Nicole Léger are respectively elected MNAs of Bourget, Hull and Pointe-aux-Trembles. The voter turnout is around 34% in the three electoral districts.
- June 25 - Resignation of Philippe Couillard as MNA of Jean-Talon and swearing in of Yves Bolduc as minister of Health and Social Services
- July 14 - Resignation of Michel Bissonnet as president of the National Assembly
- September 24 - Resignation of Michel Bissonnet as MNA of Jeanne-Mance–Viger
- September 29 - In a by-election, Yves Bolduc is elected MNA of Jean-Talon with 58.5% of the vote.
- October 21 - Election of François Gendron as president of the National Assembly
- October 22 - Resignation of Russell Copeman as MNA of Notre-Dame-de-Grâce
- October 23 - ADQ members of the National Assembly André Riedl and Pierre-Michel Auger cross the floor to sit as members of the Liberal caucus.
- November 5 - Premier Jean Charest calls a general election for December 8.
- November 25 - Leaders debate

== Opinion polls ==
Evolution of voting intentions for the 2008 Quebec general election. Dots are individual poll results and trend lines are local regressions with 95% confidence interval.

Polling firm	Last date of polling	Link	QLP	ADQ	PQ	GPQ	QS	Other
Angus Reid Strategies	December 5, 2008	PDF	42	13	36	3	5	1
Léger Marketing	December 4, 2008	PDF	45	15	32	3	4	1
CROP	December 3, 2008	PDF	45	15	29	6	5	0
Léger Marketing	November 23, 2008	PDF	46	12	34	4	4	0
CROP	November 23, 2008	PDF	45	12	32	5	5	0
Nanos Research	November 22, 2008	PDF	44	12	36	4	4	1
Léger Marketing	November 19, 2008	PDF	44	15	33	4	4	0
CROP	November 13, 2008	DOC	42	15	31	7	4	1
Environics	November 12, 2008	HTML	45	14	39	1	1	0
Léger Marketing	November 10, 2008	PDF	41	14	35	4	4	2
Léger Marketing	October 27, 2008	PDF	42	14	34	4	4	2
CROP	October 27, 2008	DOC	38	17	32	7	5	1
CROP	September 28, 2008	DOC	41	16	32	6	4	0
CROP	August 24, 2008	DOC	42	17	32	6	3	0
CROP	June 23, 2008	DOC	36	17	31	7	8	0
Léger Marketing	June 15, 2008	PDF	42	14	32	7	4	1
CROP	May 26, 2008	PDF	41	14	32	6	6	1
CROP	April 27, 2008	DOC	38	17	29	9	5	1
Léger Marketing	April 20, 2008	PDF	37	18	33	6	4	2
CROP	March 26, 2008	DOC	34	22	30	7	6	1
CROP	February 24, 2008	DOC	35	21	32	7	5	0
CROP	January 27, 2008	DOC	31	24	35	5	4	0
Léger Marketing	January 17, 2008	PDF	33	27	30	5	4	1
CROP	December 2, 2007	DOC	30	26	34	6	3	1
Léger Marketing	November 4, 2007	PDF	31	27	31	5	5	1
CROP	October 28, 2007	DOC	31	28	31	6	4	0
CROP	September 23, 2007	HTML	24	34	30	7	5	0
Léger Marketing	September 8, 2007	PDF	28	30	34	4	2	2
CROP	August 26, 2007	DOC	27	29	33	6	4	1
CROP	June 25, 2007	PDF	27	28	29	9	6	1
Léger Marketing	June 24, 2007	PDF	28	31	32	5	4	0
CROP	June 3, 2007	PDF	28	29	29	8	5	0
CROP	May 28, 2007	HTML	28	32	27	7	5	0
Léger Marketing	May 26, 2007	PDF	28	33	30	4	4	1
CROP	April 29, 2007	PDF	27	32	23	9	7	1
Léger Marketing	March 29, 2007	PDF	31	38	22	5	3	0
Last election	March 26, 2007	HTML	33.1%	30.8%	28.4%	3.9%	3.6%	0.2%

Voting intentions among French speakers

Voting intentions among non-French speakers

=== Polling by Language ===
Date(s)	Firm	Sample	Parti Québécois		Quebec Liberal Party		Action démocratique du Québec		Québec solidaire		Other		Ref.
Date(s)	Firm	Sample	Francophones	Non Francophones	Francophones	Non Francophones	Francophones	Non Francophones	Francophones	Non Francophones	Francophones	Non Francophones	Ref.
December 4, 2008	Léger		38%	9%	36%	79%	18%	5%	5%	1%	3% (Note: 3 for Green Party of Quebec)	6% (Note: 5 for Green Party of Quebec)	HTML
November 23, 2008	Léger		40%	11%	38%	78%	14%	6%	4%	1%	4% (Note: 4 for Green Party of Quebec)	5% (Note: 5 for Green Party of Quebec)	HTML
November 17, 2008	Léger		39%	12%	37%	68%	15%	14%	5%	3%	4% (Note: 4 for Green Party of Quebec)	3% (Note: 3 for Green Party of Quebec)	HTML
November 9, 2008	Léger		39%	17%	34%	66%	17%	15%	4%	5%	6% (Note: 4 for Green Party of Quebec)	7% (Note: 5 for Green Party of Quebec)	HTML
June 15, 2008	Léger		36%	18%	35%	68%	17%	4%	4%	2%	8% (Note: 7 for Green Party of Quebec)	9% (Note: 6 for Green Party of Quebec)	HTML
26 May 2008	CROP		38%	6%	32%	82%	17%	3%	6%	5%	7% (Note: 6 for Green Party of Quebec)	3% (Note: 3 for Green Party of Quebec)	HTML
April 20, 2008	Leger		37%	13%	30%	64%	20%	11%	5%	0%	7% (Note: 6 for Green Party of Quebec)	12% (Note: 7 for Green Party of Quebec)	HTML
17 January 2008	Leger		37%	7%	23%	72%	31%	12%	4%	2%	5% (Note: 4 for Green Party of Quebec)	7% (Note: 7 for Green Party of Quebec)	HTML
November 4, 2007	Leger		36%	6%	25%	61%	30%	18%	5%	2%	4% (Note: 3 for Green Party of Quebec)	13% (Note: 11 for Green Party of Quebec)	HTML
September 8, 2007	Leger		39%	8%	20%	59%	34%	14%	3%	3%	4% (Note: 3 for Green Party of Quebec)	16% (Note: 11 for Green Party of Quebec)	HTML
June 24, 2007	Leger		36%	13%	20%	66%	35%	13%	5%	1%	4% (Note: 4 for Green Party of Quebec)	7% (Note: 7 for Green Party of Quebec)	HTML
May 26, 2007	Leger		34%	8%	22%	58%	36%	20%	3%	6%	5% (Note: 4 for Green Party of Quebec)	7% (Note: 7 for Green Party of Quebec)	HTML
29 April 2007	CROP		27%	5%	20%	59%	35%	18%	8%	6%	10% (Note: 9 for Green Party of Quebec)	12% (Note: 12 for Green Party of Quebec)	HTML

== Campaign slogans ==
- Action démocratique du Québec: Donnez-vous le pouvoir ("Give yourselves the power")
- Parti libéral du Québec: L'économie d'abord OUI ("The economy first YES")
- Parti québécois: Québec gagnant avec Pauline ("Quebec is a winner with Pauline")
- Parti vert du Québec : Votons pour l'avenir ("Let's vote for the future")
- Québec solidaire : Pour un système de santé public / Pour des salaires décents / Pour une souveraineté solidaire / Pour une économie verte et locale / Pour Éole Québec ("For a public health system" / "For decent incomes" / "For an independence in solidarity" / "For a green and local economy" / "For Wind Québec" [Éole Québec is a play on the state-run Hydro-Québec power utility, and refers to the nationalization of the wind energy industry])

== Incumbent MNAs not running for re-election ==
=== Liberals ===
- Maurice Clermont, Mille-Îles
- Jean-Marc Fournier, Châteauguay
- Benoît Pelletier, Chapleau

=== Péquistes ===
- Maxime Arseneau, Îles-de-la-Madeleine
- Jacques Côté, Dubuc
- Serge Deslières, Beauharnois
- Rita Dionne-Marsolais, Rosemont
- Louise Harel, Hochelaga-Maisonneuve
- Guy Lelièvre, Gaspé

== List of candidates and results per riding ==
The results in each riding (electoral division) were:

=== Bas-Saint-Laurent and Gaspésie–Îles-de-la-Madeleine ===
Electoral district	Candidates						Incumbent
Electoral district	Liberal	ADQ	PQ	Green	QS	Other	Incumbent
Bonaventure	Nathalie Normandeau; 10,707; 64.29%	Denise Porlier; 586; 3.52%	Marcel Landry; 4,829; 28.99%		Patricia Chartier; 533; 3.20%		Nathalie Normandeau
Gaspé	Georges Mamelonet; 8,886; 56.08%	Marcelle Guay; 499; 3.15%	Annie Chouinard; 6,285; 39.67%		Simon Tremblay-Pepin; 175; 1.10%		Guy Lelièvre
Îles-de-la-Madeleine	Germain Chevarie; 3,510; 49.85%	Patrick Leblanc; 121; 1.72%	Jeannine Richard; 3,194; 45.36%	Nicolas Tremblay; 129; 1.83%	Jacques Bourdeau; 87; 1.24%		Maxime Arseneau
Kamouraska-Témiscouata	Claude Béchard; 11,048; 53.70%	Ian Sénéchal; 4,436; 21.56%	Michel Forget; 4,351; 21.15%		Manon Côté; 604; 2.94%	Alexie Plourde (Ind.); 134; 0.65%	Claude Béchard
Matane	Éric Plourde; 5,503; 33.27%	Denis Paquette; 1,127; 6.81%	Pascal Bérubé; 9,589; 57.98%		Gilles Arteau; 320; 1.93%		Pascal Bérubé
Matapédia	Jean-Yves Roy; 5,828; 33.94%	Cindy Rousseau; 1,982; 11.54%	Danielle Doyer; 8,815; 51.34%		Eve-Lyne Couturier; 544; 3.17%		Danielle Doyer
Rimouski	Raymond Guiguère; 9,424; 35.33%	Frédéric Audet; 3,410; 12.78%	Irvin Pelletier; 12,873; 48.26%		Alain Thibault; 967; 3.63%		Irvin Pelletier
Rivière-du-Loup	Jean-Pierre Rioux; 5,795; 26.98%	Mario Dumont; 11,115; 51.75%	Stephan Shields; 3,049; 14.20%	Alain Gagnon; 513; 2.39%	Stacy Larouche; 400; 1.86%	Victor-Lévy Beaulieu (Ind.); 607; 2.83%	Mario Dumont

=== Côte-Nord and Saguenay–Lac-Saint-Jean ===
Electoral district	Candidates						Incumbent
Electoral district	Liberal	ADQ	PQ	Green	QS	Other	Incumbent
Chicoutimi	Joan Simard; 12,128; 41.61%	Jean-Philippe Marin; 2,455; 8.42%	Stéphane Bédard; 13,402; 45.98%		Réjean Godin; 1,164; 3.99%		Stéphane Bédard
Dubuc	Serge Simard; 9,723; 42.85%	Robert Émond; 2,789; 12.29%	André Michaud; 9,272; 40.86%		Marie-France Bienvenue; 708; 3.12%	Fernand Bouchard (Ind.); 199; 0.88%	Jacques Côté
Duplessis	Pierre Cormier; 6,300; 34.28%	Bernard Lefrançois; 1,532; 8.34%	Lorraine Richard; 9,619; 52.34%	Jacques Gélineau; 459; 2.50%	Olivier Noël; 469; 2.55%		Lorraine Richard
Jonquière	Martine Girard; 10,367; 37.80%	Marc Jomphe; 2,913; 10.62%	Sylvain Gaudreault; 13,077; 47.68%		Gabrielle Desbiens; 1,068; 3.89%		Sylvain Gaudreault
Lac-Saint-Jean	Pierre Simard; 7,825; 29.94%	Sylvain Carbonneau; 2,764; 10.57%	Alexandre Cloutier; 14,539; 55.62%	France Bergeron; 483; 1.85%	Samuel Thivierge; 527; 2.02%		Alexandre Cloutier
René-Lévesque	Patrick Sullivan; 4,725; 26.29%	Louis-Olivier Minville; 2,198; 12.23%	Marjolain Dufour; 10,554; 58.71%		Marie-Claude Ouellette; 498; 2.77%		Marjolain Dufour
Roberval	Georges Simard; 10,905; 40.07%	Jacques Cadieux; 2,641; 9.70%	Denis Trottier; 12,528; 46.03%		Nicole Schmitt; 571; 2.10%	Sébastien Girard (PDQ); 571; 2.10%	Denis Trottier

=== Capitale-Nationale ===
Electoral district	Candidates						Incumbent
Electoral district	Liberal	ADQ	PQ	Green	QS	Other	Incumbent
Charlesbourg	Michel Pigeon; 14,196; 42.35%	Catherine Morissette; 9,814; 29.28%	Renaud Lapierre; 8,449; 25.20%		Martine Sanfaçon; 1,063; 3.17%		Catherine Morissette
Charlevoix	Jean-Luc Simard; 6,252; 31.00%	Marc Cardwell; 2,568; 12.73%	Pauline Marois; 10,532; 52.21%	David Turcotte; 326; 1.62%	André Jacob; 340; 1.69%	Jean-Michel Harvey (Ind.); 152; 0.75%	Pauline Marois
Chauveau	Sarah Perreault; 10,359; 33.76%	Gérard Deltell; 13,281; 43.28%	François Aumond; 6,267; 20.42%		Catherine Flynn; 778; 2.54%		Gilles Taillon
Jean-Lesage	André Drolet; 11,682; 41.68%	Jean-François Gosselin; 7,302; 26.05%	Hélène Guillemette; 7,497; 26.75%		Jean-Yves Desgagnés; 1,236; 4.41%	José Breton (Ind.); 314; 1.12%	Jean-François Gosselin
Jean-Talon	Yves Bolduc; 13,885; 49.79%	Martin Briand; 2,588; 9.28%	Patrick Neko Likongo; 8,937; 32.05%	Nathalie Gingras; 1,066; 3.82%	Marc-André Gauthier; 1,410; 5.06%		Yves Bolduc
La Peltrie	France Hamel; 13,133; 38.09%	Éric Caire; 13,393; 38.84%	France Gagné; 7,014; 20.34%		Guillaume Boivin; 943; 2.73%		Éric Caire
Louis-Hébert	Sam Hamad; 17,627; 48.82%	Jean Nobert; 5,863; 16.24%	Françoise Mercure; 10,508; 29.10%	Carl Lavoie; 1,069; 2.96%	Dominique Gautron; 1,037; 2.87%		Sam Hamad
Montmorency	Raymond Bernier; 12,536; 36.52%	Hubert Benoit; 11,375; 33.14%	Jacques Nadeau; 8,784; 25.59%	Jacques Legros; 726; 2.12%	Lucie Charbonneau; 751; 2.19%	Luc Duranleau (PI); 153; 0.45%	Hubert Benoit
Portneuf	Michel Matte; 11,055; 39.58%	Raymond Francoeur; 9,388; 33.61%	René Perreault; 6,553; 23.46%		André Lavoie; 934; 3.34%		Raymond Francoeur
Taschereau	Hébert Dufour; 7,845; 29.48%	Renée-Claude Lizotte; 3,563; 13.39%	Agnès Maltais; 11,768; 44.22%	Antonine Yaccarini; 1,048; 3.94%	Serge Roy; 2,241; 8.42%	Mélanie Thériault (PI); 149; 0.56%	Agnès Maltais
Vanier	Patrick Huot; 13,077; 38.33%	Sylvain Légaré; 12,599; 36.93%	Éric Boucher; 7,512; 22.02%		Monique Voisine; 931; 2.73%		Sylvain Légaré

=== Mauricie ===
Electoral district	Candidates						Incumbent
Electoral district	Liberal	ADQ	PQ	Green	QS	Other	Incumbent
Champlain	Pierre-Michel Auger; 10,286; 34.15%	Luc Arvisais; 6,582; 21.86%	Noëlla Champagne; 12,317; 40.91%		Myriam Fauteux; 714; 2.37%	Jean-Pierre Grenier (Ind.); 211; 0.70%	Pierre-Michel Auger
Laviolette	Julie Boulet; 11,645; 59.13%	Éric Tapps; 2,121; 10.77%	Claude Lessard; 5,413; 27.48%		Rémy Francoeur; 516; 2.62%		Julie Boulet
Maskinongé	Jean-Paul Diamond; 13,277; 42.18%	Jean Damphousse; 6,252; 19.86%	Rémy Désilets; 10,841; 34.44%		Mariannick Mercure; 709; 2.25%	Michel Thibeault (Ind.); 395; 1.26%	Jean Damphousse
Saint-Maurice	Céline Trépanier; 8,138; 38.43%	Robert Deschamps; 3,119; 14.73%	Claude Pinard; 8,769; 41.41%	Stéphane Normandin; 447; 2.11%	Allison Molesworth; 429; 2.03%	Yves Demers (Ind.); 276; 1.30%	Robert Deschamps
Trois-Rivières	Danielle St-Amand; 9,129; 40.10%	Sébastien Proulx; 4,241; 18.63%	Yves St-Pierre; 8,169; 35.88%	Louis Lacroix; 515; 2.26%	Alex Noël; 714; 3.14%		Sébastien Proulx

=== Chaudière-Appalaches and Centre-du-Québec ===
Electoral district	Candidates						Incumbent
Electoral district	Liberal	ADQ	PQ	Green	QS	Other	Incumbent
Arthabaska	Claude Bachand; 13,227; 42.49%	Jean-François Roux; 7,735; 24.85%	Catherine Coutel; 8,791; 28.24%	François Fillion; 690; 2.22%	Bill Ninacs; 685; 2.20%		Jean-François Roux
Beauce-Nord	Richard Lehoux; 9,612; 37.99%	Janvier Grondin; 12,633; 49.93%	Mireille Mercier-Roy; 2,297; 9.08%	Francis Paré; 381; 1.51%	Émilie Guimond-Bélanger; 264; 1.04%	Benoît Roy (Ind.); 116; 0.46%	Janvier Grondin
Beauce-Sud	Robert Dutil; 12,138; 43.37%	Claude Morin; 11,499; 41.09%	André Côté; 2,959; 10.57%	Francis Cossette; 749; 2.68%	Anne-Marie Provost; 307; 1.10%	Léo Doyon (Ind.); 332; 1.19%	Claude Morin
Bellechasse	Dominique Vien; 10,530; 47.79%	Jean Domingue; 7,553; 34.28%	Jerry Beaudoin; 3,435; 15.59%		Jean-Nicolas Denis; 518; 2.35%		Jean Domingue
Chutes-de-la-Chaudière	Réal St-Laurent; 10,657; 30.87%	Marc Picard; 15,366; 44.51%	Marie Raiche; 7,428; 21.52%		Marie-Hélène Côté-Brochu; 1,069; 3.10%		Marc Picard
Drummond	Jacques Sigouin; 10,860; 32.54%	Sébastien Schneeberger; 9,757; 29.23%	Yves-François Blanchet; 11,480; 34.40%		Luce Daneau; 1,279; 3.83%		Sébastien Schneeberger
Frontenac	Laurent Lessard; 11,785; 56.71%	Paul-André Proulx; 3,539; 17.03%	Juliette Jalbert; 4,852; 23.35%		Claudette Lambert; 423; 2.04%	Martin Duranleau (PI); 183; 0.88%	Laurent Lessard
Johnson	Denis F. Morin; 8,478; 30.99%	Éric Charbonneau; 6,318; 23.09%	Étienne-Alexis Boucher; 11,012; 40.25%	Pierre-Olivier Jetté; 919; 3.36%	Colombe Landry; 634; 2.32%		Éric Charbonneau
Lévis	Gilles Lehouillier; 12,645; 38.76%	Christian Lévesque; 11,196; 34.32%	Jimmy Grenier; 7,326; 22.46%		Valérie Guilloteau; 1,457; 4.47%		Christian Lévesque
Lotbinière	Julie Champagne; 7,540; 34.31%	Sylvie Roy; 9,615; 43.75%	Guy St-Pierre; 4,238; 19.28%		Guillaume Dorval; 586; 2.67%		Sylvie Roy
Montmagny-L'Islet	Norbert Morin; 10,027; 51.90%	Claude Roy; 5,596; 28.96%	Guy Bélanger; 3,048; 15.78%	Richard Piper; 356; 1.84%	Bernard Beaulieu; 294; 1.52%		Claude Roy
Nicolet-Yamaska	Mario Landry; 7,991; 34.56%	Éric Dorion; 6,052; 26.17%	Jean-Martin Aussant; 8,132; 35.17%		Marianne Mathis; 950; 4.11%		Éric Dorion

=== Estrie (Eastern Townships) ===
Electoral district	Candidates						Incumbent
Electoral district	Liberal	ADQ	PQ	Green	QS	Other	Incumbent
Mégantic-Compton	Johanne Gonthier; 9,204; 45.32%	Samuel Therrien; 3,268; 16.09%	Gloriane Blais; 7,079; 34.85%		Julie Dionne; 760; 3.74%		Johanne Gonthier
Orford	Pierre Reid; 14,728; 43.46%	Pierre Harvey; 4,525; 13.35%	Michel Breton; 12,470; 36.80%	Louis Hamel; 1,030; 3.04%	Patricia Tremblay; 1,135; 3.35%		Pierre Reid
Richmond	Yvon Vallières; 11,657; 51.50%	Jean-Philippe Hamel; 3,682; 16.27%	Martyne Prévost; 6,535; 28.87%		Michel Reesor; 760; 3.36%		Yvon Vallières
Saint-François	Monique Gagnon-Tremblay; 13,327; 46.96%	Vincent Marmion; 2,230; 7.86%	Réjean Hébert; 11,845; 41.74%		Sandy Tremblay; 769; 2.71%	François Mailly (Ind.); 210; 0.74%	Monique Gagnon-Tremblay
Sherbrooke	Jean Charest; 13,694; 45.21%	Jacques Joly; 2,065; 6.82%	Laurent-Paul Maheux; 11,380; 37.57%	Steve Dubois; 1,016; 3.35%	Christian Bibeau; 1,956; 6.46%	Hubert Richard (Ind.); 178; 0.59%	Jean Charest

=== Montérégie ===
==== Eastern Montérégie ====
Electoral district	Candidates						Incumbent
Electoral district	Liberal	ADQ	PQ	Green	QS	Other	Incumbent
Borduas	Jacques Charbonneau; 9,125; 32.61%	Jean Dion; 3,430; 12.26%	Pierre Curzi; 13,329; 47.63%	Marco Caron; 914; 3.27%	Eric Noël; 966; 3.45%	Michel Lepage (PI); 219; 0.78%	Pierre Curzi
Brome-Missisquoi	Pierre Paradis; 14,926; 49.11%	Mario Charpentier; 5,127; 16.87%	Richard Leclerc; 8,280; 27.24%	Louise Martineau; 1,006; 3.31%	Diane Cormier; 884; 2.91%	Jacques-Antoine Normandin (Ind.); 171; 0.56%	Pierre Paradis
Chambly	Stéphanie Doyon; 14,485; 36.11%	Richard Merlini; 6,455; 16.09%	Bertrand St-Arnaud; 16,049; 40.01%	Nicholas Lescarbeau; 1,200; 2.99%	Jocelyn Roy; 1,167; 2.91%	Ghislain Lebel (PI); 758; 1.89%	Richard Merlini
Iberville	André Riedl; 9,075; 32.01%	Lyne Denechaud; 6,087; 21.47%	Marie Bouillé; 11,698; 41.26%	Guy Berger; 882; 3.11%	André Dupuis; 612; 2.16%		André Riedl
Richelieu	Christian Cournoyer; 8,546; 34.63%	Patrick Fournier; 3,127; 12.67%	Sylvain Simard; 11,607; 47.04%	Patrick Lamothe; 691; 2.80%	Paul Martin; 704; 2.85%		Sylvain Simard
Saint-Hyacinthe	Claude Corbeil; 11,609; 37.38%	Claude L'Écuyer; 5,690; 18.32%	Émilien Pelletier; 11,822; 38.07%	Louis-Pierre Beaudry; 975; 3.14%	Richard Gingras; 957; 3.08%		Claude L'Écuyer
Saint-Jean	Jean-Pierre Paquin; 12,568; 36.52%	Lucille Méthé; 6,266; 18.21%	Dave Turcotte; 13,474; 39.15%	Éric Beaudry; 1,034; 3.00%	Danielle Desmarais; 768; 2.23%	Martin Rioux (PI); 189; 0.55% Guillaume Tremblay (Ind.); 118; 0.34%	Lucille Méthé
Shefford	Jean-Claude Tremblay; 11,201; 34.42%	François Bonnardel; 11,271; 34.63%	Jean-François Arseneault; 8,019; 24.64%	Martin Giard; 789; 2.42%	Ginette Moreau; 1,085; 3.33%	Lucie Piédalue (Ind.); 181; 0.56%	François Bonnardel
Verchères	Vincent Sabourin; 6,389; 22.87%	Daniel Castonguay; 4,333; 15.52%	Stéphane Bergeron; 15,457; 55.37%	Christine Hayes; 842; 3.02%	Lynda Gadoury; 737; 2.64%	Yvon Sylva Aubé (PI); 158; 0.57%	Stéphane Bergeron

==== South Shore ====
Electoral district	Candidates						Incumbent
Electoral district	Liberal	ADQ	PQ	Green	QS	Other	Incumbent
Beauharnois	Louis-Charles Roy; 8,811; 33.64%	Michael Betts; 3,311; 12.64%	Guy Leclair; 12,349; 47.15%	Stéphanie Théorêt; 570; 2.18%	Maxime Larue-Bourdages; 681; 2.60%	Christian Grenon (Ind.); 467; 1.78%	Serge Deslières
Châteauguay	Pierre Moreau; 13,583; 41.41%	Geneviève Tousignant; 4,115; 12.54%	Michel Pinard; 13,132; 40.03%	Johanne Côté; 967; 2.95%	Véronique Pronovost; 677; 2.06%	Nicole Caron (PI); 215; 0.66% Hélène Héroux (M-L); 115; 0.35%	Jean-Marc Fournier
Huntingdon	Stéphane Billette; 11,178; 44.01%	Albert De Martin; 6,372; 25.09%	Joan Gosselin; 6,988; 27.51%		Stéphane Thellen; 863; 3.40%		Albert De Martin
La Pinière	Fatima Houda-Pepin; 17,480; 61.44%	Marc-André Beauchemin; 2,822; 9.92%	Jocelyne Duguay-Varfalvy; 7,046; 24.77%		Nadine Beaudoin; 971; 3.41%	Serge Patenaude (M-L); 131; 0.46%	Fatima Houda-Pepin
Laporte	Nicole Ménard; 12,823; 49.01%	Alain Dépatie; 2,462; 9.41%	Robert Pellan; 8,765; 33.50%	Richard Morisset; 1,162; 4.44%	Michèle St-Denis; 954; 3.65%		Nicole Ménard
La Prairie	Marc Savard; 13,621; 37.41%	Monique Roy Verville; 5,162; 14.18%	François Rebello; 16,322; 44.83%		Danielle Maire; 759; 2.08%	Martin McNeil (Ind.); 392; 1.08% Normand Chouinard (M-L); 150; 0.41%	Monique Roy Verville
Marguerite-D'Youville	Jean-Robert Grenier; 13,096; 35.85%	Simon-Pierre Diamond; 6,731; 18.43%	Monique Richard; 14,545; 39.82%	Thomas Goyette-Levac; 1,097; 3.00%	Hugo Bergeron; 1,059; 2.90%		Simon-Pierre Diamond
Marie-Victorin	Isabelle Mercille; 6,185; 28.92%	Roger Dagenais; 2,369; 11.08%	Bernard Drainville; 11,026; 51.56%	Réal Langelier; 665; 3.11%	Sébastien Robert; 957; 4.48%	Yves Ménard (PI); 182; 0.85%	Bernard Drainville
Soulanges	Lucie Charlebois; 11,564; 46.29%	Daniel Lavigne; 2,992; 11.98%	Louisanne Chevrier; 9,229; 36.95%	Denis Eperjusy; 736; 2.95%	Jonathan Vallée-Payette; 459; 1.84%		Lucie Charlebois
Taillon	Richard Bélisle; 10,688; 32.98%	Karine Simard; 3,889; 12.00%	Marie Malavoy; 15,021; 46.34%	Simon Bernier; 1,094; 3.37%	Manon Blanchard; 1,374; 4.24%	Éric Tremblay (PI); 349; 1.08%	Marie Malavoy
Vachon	Georges Painchaud; 8,802; 32.26%	Jean-François Denis; 3,776; 13.84%	Camil Bouchard; 13,203; 48.39%	Denis Durand; 886; 3.25%	François Cyr; 615; 2.25%		Camil Bouchard
Vaudreuil	Yvon Marcoux; 15,827; 54.08%	Lucie Boudreault; 2,578; 8.81%	Claude Turcotte; 8,789; 30.03%	Julien Leclerc; 1,083; 3.70%	Maria-Pia Chavez; 543; 1.86%	Kevin Côté (Ind.); 305; 1.04% Gilles Paquette (PRQ); 140; 0.48%	Yvon Marcoux

=== Montréal ===
==== East Montreal ====
Electoral district	Candidates						Incumbent
Electoral district	Liberal	ADQ	PQ	Green	QS	Other	Incumbent
Anjou	Lise Thériault; 13,082	Jacques Lachapelle; 2,242	Sébastien Richard; 8,927	Sylvie Morneau; 727	Francine Gagné; 944		Lise Thériault
Bourassa-Sauvé	Line Beauchamp; 13,736	Guy Mailloux; 1,933	Roland Carrier; 6,059		Enrico Gambardella; 732		Line Beauchamp
Bourget	Pierre MacNicoll; 7,984	Guy Boutin; 2,677	Maka Kotto; 13,046	Gilbert Caron; 939	Gaétan Legault; 1,177	Antonis Labbé (PI); 127	Maka Kotto
Crémazie	Martin Cossette; 11,757	Diane Charbonneau; 1,847	Lisette Lapointe; 12,947	Daniel Hémond; 778	André Frappier; 1,639		Lisette Lapointe
Gouin	Édith Keays; 4,974	Caroline Giroux; 895	Nicolas Girard; 10,276	Stephen Marchant; 753	Françoise David; 7,987	Jonathan Godin (PI); 110	Nicolas Girard
Hochelaga-Maisonneuve	Julie Tremblay; 4,115	Jean-Lévy Champagne; 1,303	Carole Poirier; 10,529	Sylvie Woods; 816	Serge Mongeau; 2,502	Christine Dandenault (M-L); 117	Louise Harel
Jeanne-Mance–Viger	Filomena Rotiroti; 16,303	Luigi Verrelli; 1,736	Christine Normandin; 3,379		Céline Gingras; 554	Katia Proulx (Ind.); 284; Garnet Colly (M-L); 125	Vacant
LaFontaine	Tony Tomassi; 14,031	Gaetano Giumento; 1,306	Luigi De Benedictis; 3,838	Gaétan Bérard; 549	Natacha Larocque; 389		Tony Tomassi
Laurier-Dorion	Gerry Sklavounos; 9,769	Olivier Manceau; 943	Badiona Bazin; 7,701	Michel Lemay; 1,090	Ruba Ghazal; 2,963	Peter Macrisopoulos (M-L); 219; Michel Prairie (Ind.); 86	Gerry Sklavounos
Mercier	Catherine Émond; 4,940	Elysa Toutant; 575	Daniel Turp; 7,989	Olivier Adam; 833	Amir Khadir; 8,861	Jean-Marc Labrèche (PI); 83	Daniel Turp
Pointe-aux-Trembles	Gilbert Thibodeau; 5,581	Pierre Trudelle; 2,525	Nicole Léger; 12,845	Xavier Daxhelet; 733	Marie-Josèphe Pigeon; 664	Gérald Briand (Ind.); 159; Geneviève Royer (M-L); 81	Nicole Léger
Rosemont	Nathalie Rivard; 9,557	Audrey Serec; 1,901	Louise Beaudoin; 15,149	Sylvain Valiquette; 816	François Saillant; 2,470	Stephane Chénier (M-L); 88	Rita Dionne-Marsolais
Sainte-Marie–Saint-Jacques	Éric Prud'homme; 5,536	Dominic Boisvert; 793	Martin Lemay; 9,135	Annie Morel; 1,089	Manon Massé; 3,009	Serge Lachapelle (M-L); 207	Martin Lemay
Viau	Emmanuel Dubourg; 10,705	Martin Fournier; 1,186	Martine Banolok; 4,783	Michel Cummings; 678	Rosa Dutra; 916		Emmanuel Dubourg

==== West Montreal ====
Electoral district	Candidates						Incumbent
Electoral district	Liberal	ADQ	PQ	Green	QS	Other	Incumbent
Acadie	Christine St-Pierre; 15,240	Ahamed Badawy; 980	Marc-André Nolet; 4,717	Nicolas Rémillard-Tessier; 755	André Parizeau; 956		Christine St-Pierre
D'Arcy-McGee	Lawrence Bergman; 14,087	Mathieu Lacombe; 292	Marie-Aude Ardizzon; 564	Jean-Christophe Mortreux; 666	Abraham Weizfeld; 264		Lawrence Bergman
Jacques-Cartier	Geoffrey Kelley; 20,428	Marie-Hélène Trudel; 980	Olivier Gendreau; 1,555	Ryan Young; 1,895	Marianne Breton-Fontaine; 364	Marsha Fine (M-L); 87	Geoffrey Kelley
Marguerite-Bourgeoys	Monique Jérôme-Forget; 14,490	Michel Beaudoin; 1,900	Félix Sylvestre-Kentzinger; 4,750		Elena Tapia; 752		Monique Jérôme-Forget
Marquette	François Ouimet; 13,471	Marc-Antoine Desjardins; 2,062	Catherine Major; 6,451	Réjean Malette; 1,308	Manuel Teigeiro; 588	Yves Le Seigle (M-L); 86	François Ouimet
Mont-Royal	Pierre Arcand; 12,205	Caroline Morgan; 555	Simon Robert-Chartrand; 1,854	Mario Bonenfant; 736	Robbie Mahoud; 577	Diane Johnston (M-L); 69	Pierre Arcand
Nelligan	Yolande James; 18,039	François Savard; 1,418	Anais Valiquette-L'Heureux; 3,634	Jonathan Théorêt; 1,556	Elahé Machouf; 378		Yolande James
Notre-Dame-de-Grâce	Kathleen Weil; 11,485	Matthew Conway; 481	Fabrice Martel; 2,307	Peter McQueen; 2,430		Linda Sullivan (M-L); 124; David Sommer Rovins (Ind.); 64	Vacant
Outremont	Raymond Bachand; 10,571	Christian Collard; 577	Sophie Fréchette; 4,919	Maxime Simard; 1,204	May Chiu; 2,228		Raymond Bachand
Robert-Baldwin	Pierre Marsan; 17,078	Alexandra Lauzon; 877	Alexandre Pagé-Chassé; 1,602	Maryse Goulet; 1,059	Sarah Landry; 375	Nicholas Lin (M-L); 74	Pierre Marsan
Saint-Henri–Sainte-Anne	Marguerite Blais; 10,552	Claude-Ludovic Mbany; 1,326	Frédéric Isaya; 8,535	Tim Landry; 985	Marie-Ève Rancourt; 1,471	Jean-Paul Bédard (M-L); 146	Marguerite Blais
Saint-Laurent	Jacques P. Dupuis; 15,663	José Fiorilo; 1,009	Gabrielle Dufour-Turcotte; 3,505		William Sloan; 731	Fernand Deschamps (M-L); 147	Jacques P. Dupuis
Verdun	Henri-François Gautrin; 11,223	Moscou Côté; 1,411	Richard Langlais; 8,314	Sébastien Beausoleil; 1,087	Chantale Michaud; 1,215	Sylvie Tremblay (Ind.); 216; Robert Lindblad (Ind.); 61	Henri-François Gautrin
Westmount–Saint-Louis	Jacques Chagnon; 11,041	Léonidas Priftakis; 438	Daniella Johnson-Meneghini; 1,525	Patrick Daoust; 1,090	Nadia Alexan; 641		Jacques Chagnon

=== Laval ===
Electoral district	Candidates						Incumbent
Electoral district	Liberal	ADQ	PQ	Green	QS	Other	Incumbent
Chomedey	Guy Ouellette; 16,482	Josée Granger; 1,932	Jonathan Cyr; 5,218	Christian Picard; 618	Francine Bellerose; 547	Polyvios Tsakanikas (M-L); 234	Guy Ouellette
Fabre	Michelle Courchesne; 15,349	Tom Pentefountas; 4,024	François-Ghyslain Rocque; 12,425	Erika Alvarez; 1,021	Pierre Brien; 918		Michelle Courchesne
Laval-des-Rapides	Alain Paquet; 11,551	Robert Goulet; 2,727	Marc Demers; 10,264	Nicholas Sarrazin; 779	Sylvie DesRochers; 758	Mathieu Desbiens (PI); 151; Jacques Frigon (Ind.); 125; Yvon Breton (M-L); 114	Alain Paquet
Mille-Îles	Francine Charbonneau; 15,334	Pierre Tremblay; 3,588	Donato Santomo; 12,124	Maude Delangis; 903	Nicole Bellerose; 905	Isabelle Gérin-Lajoie (Ind.); 191; Régent Millette (Ind.); 44	Maurice Clermont
Vimont	Vincent Auclair; 16,217	Pierre Brien; 3,932	Rachel Demers; 12,257		Audrey Boisvert; 1,537		Vincent Auclair

=== Lanaudière ===
Electoral district	Candidates						Incumbent
Electoral district	Liberal	ADQ	PQ	Green	QS	Other	Incumbent
Berthier	Norman Blackburn; 8,393	François Benjamin; 8,239	André Villeneuve; 13,650	Yan Beaudry; 903	Jocelyne Dupuis; 931		François Benjamin
Joliette	Christian Trudel; 9,168	Pascal Beaupré; 6,171	Véronique Hivon; 14,647		Flavie Trudel; 1,544	Pablo Lugo-Herrera (Ind.); 244	Pascal Beaupré
L'Assomption	Christian Gauthier; 11,384	Éric Laporte; 6,977	Scott McKay; 15,494	Chantal Latour; 946	Olivier Huart; 1,099	Fanny Bérubé (PI); 341	Éric Laporte
Masson	David Grégoire; 8,174	Ginette Grandmont; 7,436	Guillaume Tremblay; 17,997	Michel Paulette; 954	Gabriel Poirier; 716	Bertrand Lefebvre (PI); 257	Ginette Grandmont
Rousseau	Michel Fafard; 6,689	Jean-Pierre Parrot; 4,778	François Legault; 16,783	Michel Popik; 607	François Lépine; 730		François Legault
Terrebonne	Chantal Leblanc; 9,439	Jean-François Therrien; 7,377	Mathieu Traversy; 15,455	Yoland Gilbert; 1,103	Sabrina Perreault; 894		Jean-François Therrien

=== Laurentides ===
Electoral district	Candidates						Incumbent
Electoral district	Liberal	ADQ	PQ	Green	QS	Other	Incumbent
Argenteuil	David Whissell; 10,843	Michael Perzow; 2,455	John Saywell; 7,353	Claude Sabourin; 790	Loïc Kauffeisen; 456		David Whissell
Bertrand	Isabelle Lord; 10,424	Diane Bellemare; 3,463	Claude Cousineau; 14,970	Michelle L. Déry; 839	Mylène Jaccoud; 843		Claude Cousineau
Blainville	Johanne Berthiaume; 11,301	Pierre Gingras; 7,677	Daniel Ratthé; 14,118	Michel Sigouin; 962	Francis Gagnon-Bergmann; 798		Pierre Gingras
Deux-Montagnes	Marie-France D'Aoust; 8,979	Lucie Leblanc; 4,983	Benoit Charette; 11,932	Guy Rainville; 1,168	Julien Demers; 632		Lucie Leblanc
Groulx	Monique Laurin; 10,823	Linda Lapointe; 6,036	René Gauvreau; 11,226	Carmen Brisebois; 955	Adam Veilleux; 701	Sébastien Hotte (PI); 102	Linda Lapointe
Labelle	Déborah Bélanger; 7,140	Claude Ouellette; 2,807	Sylvain Pagé; 13,195	François Beauchamp; 754	Luc Boisjoli; 751		Sylvain Pagé
Mirabel	Ritha Cossette; 7,207	François Desrochers; 6,522	Denise Beaudoin; 13,700	Simon Cadieux; 847	Kim Joly; 621		François Desrochers
Prévost	Jacques Gariépy; 10,001	Martin Camirand; 7,193	Gilles Robert; 15,229	Bernard Anton; 913	Lise Boivin; 1,107		Martin Camirand

=== Outaouais ===
Electoral district	Candidates						Incumbent
Electoral district	Liberal	ADQ	PQ	Green	QS	Other	Incumbent
Chapleau	Marc Carrière; 13,968	Gilles Taillon; 3,182	Yves Morin; 6,560	Roger Fleury; 1,032	Benoît Renaud; 609	Jean-Pierre Grenier (Ind.); 118; Pierre Soublière (M-L); 51	Benoît Pelletier
Gatineau	Stéphanie Vallée; 14,506	Serge Charrette; 2,395	Thérèse Viel-Déry; 7,176			Benoit Legros (M-L); 304	Stéphanie Vallée
Hull	Maryse Gaudreault; 11,924	Renée Gagné; 1,319	Gilles Aubé; 7,602		Bill Clennett; 2,006	Jean-Roch Villemaire (PI); 139; Gabriel Girard-Bernier (M-L); 101	Maryse Gaudreault
Papineau	Norman MacMillan; 13,786	Bruno Lemieux; 2,825	Gilles Hébert; 8,674	Patrick Mailloux; 790	Françoise Breault; 805	Christian-Simon Ferlatte (M-L); 92	Norman MacMillan
Pontiac	Charlotte L'Écuyer; 12,960	Christian Toussaint; 1,215	Nathalie Lepage; 3,553	Gail Lemmon Walker; 950	Charmain Lévy; 804	Lisa Leblanc (M-L); 122	Charlotte L'Écuyer

=== Abitibi-Témiscamingue and Nord-du-Québec ===
Electoral district	Candidates						Incumbent
Electoral district	Liberal	ADQ	PQ	Green	QS	Other	Incumbent
Abitibi-Est	Pierre Corbeil; 8,942	Samuel Dupras; 1,742	Alexis Wawanoloath; 8,427		Lizon Boucher; 438		Alexis Wawanoloath
Abitibi-Ouest	Claude Nelson Morin; 5,309	Sébastien D'Astous; 2,182	François Gendron; 10,570			Grégory Vézeau (PI); 370	François Gendron
Rouyn-Noranda–Témiscamingue	Daniel Bernard; 10,358	Paul-Émile Barbeau; 4,111	Johanne Morasse; 8,604		Guy Leclerc; 1,413		Johanne Morasse
Ungava	Pierre Gaudreault; 3,015	Pascal Dion; 917	Luc Ferland; 4,118		Mélanie Dufour; 439	Gilbert Hamel (Ind.); 218	Luc Ferland

== Results ==
The overall results were:

Summary of the December 8, 2008 National Assembly of Quebec election results
Party	Party leader	Candi- dates	Seats					Popular vote		
Party	Party leader	Candi- dates	2007	Dissol.	2008	Change	%	#	%	Change
Liberal	Jean Charest	125	48	48	66	+18	52.80%	1,366,046	42.08%	+9.00%
Parti Québécois	Pauline Marois	125	36	36	51	+15	40.80%	1,141,751	35.17%	+6.82%
Action démocratique	Mario Dumont	125	41	39	7	-34	5.60%	531,358	16.37%	-14.47%
Québec solidaire	Françoise David; Amir Khadir^{†}	122	-	-	1	+1	0.80%	122,618	3.78%	+0.14%
Green	Guy Rainville	80	-	-	-	-	-	70,393	2.17%	-1.68%
Parti indépendantiste	Éric Tremblay	19	*	-	-	*	-	4,227	0.13%	*
Marxist–Leninist	Pierre Chénier	23	-	-	-	-	-	2,727	0.08%	+0.03%
Durable	Sébastien Girard	1	*	-	-	*	-	567	0.02%	*
Republic of Quebec	Gilles Paquette	1	*	-	-	*	-	140	<0.01%	*
Independents		30	-	-	-	-	-	6,506	0.20%	+0.09%
Vacant				2						
Total		651	125	125	125	-	100%	3,246,333	100%	
Notes: "Change" refers to change from previous election.^{†} The party designated David and Khadir as co-spokespeople; the de jure leader recognized by the Directeur général des éléctions was Benoît Renaud. * Party did not nominate candidates in the previous election.

=== Vote and seat summaries ===
Ternary plots - shift of electoral support (2007-2008)
2007

2008
Electoral districts identified by colours of winning parties

Vote share
PLQ	42.08%
PQ	35.17%
ADQ	16.37%
QS	3.78%
Green	2.17%
Others	0.44%

Seats
PLQ	52.80%
PQ	40.80%
ADQ	5.60%
QS	0.80%

=== Synopsis of results ===
Results by riding - 2008 Quebec general election
Riding	Winning party								Turnout (Note: including spoilt ballots)	Votes (Note: All parties with more than 1% of the vote are shown individually. Independent candidates and other minor parties are aggregated separately. Parties are presented in the order shown on EQ data.)							
Name	2007	1st place	Votes	Share	Margin #	Margin %	2nd place	3rd place	Turnout	PLQ	PQ	ADQ	QS	PVQ	Ind	Other	Total
Abitibi-Est	PQ	PLQ	8,942	45.74%	515	2.63%	PQ	ADQ	58.73%	8,942	8,427	1,742	438	–	–	–	19,549
Abitibi-Ouest	PQ	PQ	10,597	57.32%	5,280	28.56%	PLQ	ADQ	57.06%	5,317	10,597	2,198	–	–	–	375	18,487
Acadie	PLQ	PLQ	15,145	67.16%	10,427	46.24%	PQ	ADQ	46.91%	15,145	4,718	982	958	747	–	–	22,550
Anjou	PLQ	PLQ	13,082	50.44%	4,152	16.01%	PQ	ADQ	58.88%	13,082	8,930	2,252	944	727	–	–	25,935
Argenteuil	PLQ	PLQ	10,843	49.58%	3,490	15.96%	PQ	ADQ	54.17%	10,843	7,353	2,457	456	760	–	–	21,869
Arthabaska	ADQ	PLQ	13,304	42.55%	4,510	14.43%	PQ	ADQ	63.96%	13,304	8,794	7,777	697	693	–	–	31,265
Beauce-Nord	ADQ	ADQ	12,633	49.92%	3,021	11.94%	PLQ	PQ	63.86%	9,612	2,297	12,633	264	384	117	–	25,307
Beauce-Sud	ADQ	PLQ	12,108	43.62%	570	2.05%	ADQ	PQ	59.99%	12,108	2,947	11,538	315	536	311	–	27,755
Beauharnois	PQ	PQ	12,349	47.15%	3,538	13.51%	PLQ	ADQ	61.00%	8,811	12,349	3,311	681	570	467	–	26,189
Bellechasse	ADQ	PLQ	10,530	47.66%	2,932	13.27%	ADQ	PQ	64.35%	10,530	3,450	7,598	518	–	–	–	22,096
Berthier	ADQ	PQ	13,776	42.50%	5,341	16.48%	PLQ	ADQ	60.43%	8,435	13,776	8,358	934	911	–	–	32,414
Bertrand	PQ	PQ	15,263	49.12%	4,636	14.92%	PLQ	ADQ	58.04%	10,627	15,263	3,496	851	834	–	–	31,071
Blainville	ADQ	PQ	13,989	40.52%	2,772	8.03%	PLQ	ADQ	60.91%	11,217	13,989	7,571	789	954	–	–	34,520
Bonaventure	PLQ	PLQ	10,707	64.23%	5,863	35.17%	PQ	ADQ	58.02%	10,707	4,844	586	533	–	–	–	16,670
Borduas	PQ	PQ	13,329	47.66%	4,204	15.03%	PLQ	ADQ	65.87%	9,125	13,329	3,430	966	904	–	214	27,968
Bourassa-Sauvé	PLQ	PLQ	13,950	61.33%	7,839	34.46%	PQ	ADQ	47.68%	13,950	6,111	1,947	738	–	–	–	22,746
Bourget	PQ	PQ	13,007	50.19%	5,023	19.38%	PLQ	ADQ	55.56%	7,984	13,007	2,677	1,180	939	–	127	25,914
Brome-Missisquoi	PLQ	PLQ	15,006	49.24%	6,681	21.92%	PQ	ADQ	60.39%	15,006	8,325	5,073	884	1,012	173	–	30,473
Chambly	ADQ	PQ	16,049	40.01%	1,564	3.90%	PLQ	ADQ	66.62%	14,485	16,049	6,455	1,167	1,200	–	758	40,114
Champlain	ADQ	PQ	12,317	40.98%	2,024	6.73%	PLQ	ADQ	64.38%	10,293	12,317	6,582	654	–	211	–	30,057
Chapleau	PLQ	PLQ	13,968	54.71%	7,408	29.01%	PQ	ADQ	47.96%	13,968	6,560	3,194	609	1,032	118	51	25,532
Charlesbourg	ADQ	PLQ	14,196	42.36%	4,382	13.08%	ADQ	PQ	65.79%	14,196	8,449	9,814	1,053	–	–	–	33,512
Charlevoix	PQ	PQ	10,510	52.21%	4,269	21.21%	PLQ	ADQ	61.01%	6,241	10,510	2,560	343	325	150	–	20,129
Châteauguay	PLQ	PLQ	13,637	41.49%	495	1.51%	PQ	ADQ	58.26%	13,637	13,142	4,091	703	967	–	327	32,867
Chauveau	ADQ	ADQ	14,029	42.75%	2,605	7.94%	PLQ	PQ	61.63%	11,424	6,559	14,029	801	–	–	–	32,813
Chicoutimi	PQ	PQ	13,400	45.96%	1,282	4.40%	PLQ	ADQ	63.71%	12,118	13,400	2,465	1,174	–	–	–	29,157
Chomedey	PLQ	PLQ	16,702	66.12%	11,392	45.10%	PQ	ADQ	45.21%	16,702	5,310	1,936	556	625	–	133	25,262
Chutes-de-la-Chaudière	ADQ	ADQ	15,536	44.77%	4,879	14.06%	PLQ	PQ	67.16%	10,657	7,437	15,536	1,070	–	–	–	34,700
Crémazie	PQ	PQ	12,972	45.13%	1,412	4.91%	PLQ	ADQ	62.29%	11,560	12,972	1,808	1,627	776	–	–	28,743
D'Arcy-McGee	PLQ	PLQ	14,087	88.75%	13,421	84.55%	PVQ	PQ	38.89%	14,087	564	292	264	666	–	–	15,873
Deux-Montagnes	ADQ	PQ	11,961	43.14%	2,981	10.75%	PLQ	ADQ	61.03%	8,980	11,961	4,986	632	1,168	–	–	27,727
Drummond	ADQ	PQ	11,581	34.40%	615	1.83%	PLQ	ADQ	59.30%	10,966	11,581	9,826	1,293	–	–	–	33,666
Dubuc	PQ	PLQ	9,695	42.78%	424	1.87%	PQ	ADQ	60.65%	9,695	9,271	2,789	708	–	199	–	22,662
Duplessis	PQ	PQ	9,622	52.35%	3,322	18.07%	PLQ	ADQ	50.26%	6,300	9,622	1,535	469	454	–	–	18,380
Fabre	PLQ	PLQ	15,349	45.50%	2,924	8.67%	PQ	ADQ	57.08%	15,349	12,425	4,024	918	1,021	–	–	33,737
Frontenac	PLQ	PLQ	11,785	56.71%	6,933	33.36%	PQ	ADQ	63.58%	11,785	4,852	3,539	423	–	–	183	20,782
Gaspé	PQ	PLQ	8,947	56.25%	2,662	16.74%	PQ	ADQ	58.17%	8,947	6,285	499	175	–	–	–	15,906
Gatineau	PLQ	PLQ	14,566	59.80%	7,399	30.38%	PQ	ADQ	49.48%	14,566	7,167	2,318	–	–	–	306	24,357
Gouin	PQ	PQ	10,276	41.18%	2,329	9.33%	QS	PLQ	58.03%	4,972	10,276	895	7,947	753	–	110	24,953
Groulx	ADQ	PQ	11,226	37.62%	403	1.35%	PLQ	ADQ	61.33%	10,823	11,226	6,036	701	955	–	102	29,843
Hochelaga-Maisonneuve	PQ	PQ	10,530	54.31%	6,415	33.08%	PLQ	QS	47.82%	4,115	10,530	1,303	2,508	817	–	117	19,390
Hull	PLQ	PLQ	11,651	51.27%	4,110	18.09%	PQ	QS	47.72%	11,651	7,541	1,309	1,994	–	–	231	22,726
Huntingdon	ADQ	PLQ	11,329	44.33%	4,305	16.84%	PQ	ADQ	57.81%	11,329	7,024	6,431	774	–	–	–	25,558
Iberville	ADQ	PQ	11,698	41.28%	2,623	9.26%	PLQ	ADQ	61.62%	9,075	11,698	6,085	605	876	–	–	28,339
Îles-de-la-Madeleine	PQ	PLQ	3,510	49.85%	316	4.49%	PQ	PVQ	66.35%	3,510	3,194	121	87	129	–	–	7,041
Jacques-Cartier	PLQ	PLQ	20,433	80.85%	18,536	73.35%	PVQ	PQ	52.77%	20,433	1,522	969	364	1,897	–	87	25,272
Jean-Lesage	ADQ	PLQ	11,674	41.68%	4,203	15.01%	PQ	ADQ	58.60%	11,674	7,471	7,307	1,238	–	316	–	28,006
Jean-Talon	PLQ	PLQ	13,853	49.71%	4,861	17.44%	PQ	ADQ	69.07%	13,853	8,992	2,546	1,409	1,065	–	–	27,865
Jeanne-Mance-Viger	PLQ	PLQ	16,433	73.05%	13,054	58.03%	PQ	ADQ	46.95%	16,433	3,379	1,726	554	–	281	124	22,497
Johnson	ADQ	PQ	10,973	40.21%	2,502	9.17%	PLQ	ADQ	63.02%	8,471	10,973	6,297	634	914	–	–	27,289
Joliette	ADQ	PQ	14,666	46.09%	5,491	17.26%	PLQ	ADQ	62.60%	9,175	14,666	6,185	1,549	–	246	–	31,821
Jonquière	PQ	PQ	13,077	47.68%	2,710	9.88%	PLQ	ADQ	62.52%	10,367	13,077	2,913	1,068	–	–	–	27,425
Kamouraska-Témiscouata	PLQ	PLQ	11,048	53.70%	6,612	32.14%	ADQ	PQ	60.55%	11,048	4,351	4,436	604	–	134	–	20,573
Labelle	PQ	PQ	13,255	53.50%	6,078	24.53%	PLQ	ADQ	55.01%	7,177	13,255	2,837	755	752	–	–	24,776
Lac-Saint-Jean	PQ	PQ	14,536	55.62%	6,711	25.68%	PLQ	ADQ	63.20%	7,825	14,536	2,764	527	483	–	–	26,135
LaFontaine	PLQ	PLQ	14,021	69.76%	10,181	50.65%	PQ	ADQ	51.16%	14,021	3,840	1,306	383	549	–	–	20,099
La Peltrie	ADQ	ADQ	13,461	39.17%	436	1.27%	PLQ	PQ	65.36%	13,025	6,988	13,461	888	–	–	–	34,362
La Pinière	PLQ	PLQ	17,480	61.44%	10,434	36.67%	PQ	ADQ	52.17%	17,480	7,046	2,822	971	–	–	131	28,450
Laporte	PLQ	PLQ	12,823	48.97%	4,048	15.46%	PQ	ADQ	58.05%	12,823	8,775	2,472	954	1,162	–	–	26,186
La Prairie	ADQ	PQ	16,382	44.83%	2,704	7.40%	PLQ	ADQ	63.62%	13,678	16,382	5,178	760	–	392	150	36,540
L'Assomption	ADQ	PQ	15,438	42.77%	4,090	11.33%	PLQ	ADQ	63.21%	11,348	15,438	6,938	1,090	940	–	341	36,095
Laurier-Dorion	PLQ	PLQ	9,769	42.90%	2,069	9.09%	PQ	QS	49.16%	9,769	7,700	943	2,963	1,090	86	219	22,770
Laval-des-Rapides	PLQ	PLQ	11,757	44.07%	1,365	5.12%	PQ	ADQ	55.11%	11,757	10,392	2,722	766	683	112	246	26,678
Laviolette	PLQ	PLQ	11,667	59.06%	6,224	31.51%	PQ	ADQ	58.72%	11,667	5,443	2,127	517	–	–	–	19,754
Lévis	ADQ	PLQ	12,646	38.65%	1,447	4.42%	ADQ	PQ	64.13%	12,646	7,438	11,199	1,438	–	–	–	32,721
Lotbinière	ADQ	ADQ	9,659	43.98%	2,082	9.48%	PLQ	PQ	65.01%	7,577	4,238	9,659	488	–	–	–	21,962
Louis-Hébert	PLQ	PLQ	17,650	48.85%	7,137	19.75%	PQ	ADQ	70.35%	17,650	10,513	5,872	1,031	1,068	–	–	36,134
Marguerite-Bourgeoys	PLQ	PLQ	14,490	66.19%	9,740	44.49%	PQ	ADQ	48.09%	14,490	4,750	1,899	752	–	–	–	21,891
Marguerite-D'Youville	ADQ	PQ	14,533	39.75%	1,414	3.87%	PLQ	ADQ	71.39%	13,119	14,533	6,750	1,064	1,097	–	–	36,563
Marie-Victorin	PQ	PQ	11,026	51.56%	4,841	22.64%	PLQ	ADQ	53.29%	6,185	11,026	2,369	957	665	–	182	21,384
Marquette	PLQ	PLQ	13,471	56.21%	7,020	29.29%	PQ	ADQ	49.09%	13,471	6,451	2,062	588	1,308	–	86	23,966
Maskinongé	ADQ	PLQ	13,429	42.25%	2,441	7.68%	PQ	ADQ	64.25%	13,429	10,988	6,259	708	–	397	–	31,781
Masson	ADQ	PQ	18,037	50.68%	9,863	27.71%	PLQ	ADQ	57.10%	8,174	18,037	7,466	716	948	–	251	35,592
Matane	PQ	PQ	9,589	58.01%	4,086	24.72%	PLQ	ADQ	59.60%	5,503	9,589	1,117	320	–	–	–	16,529
Matapédia	PQ	PQ	8,802	51.89%	2,980	17.57%	PLQ	ADQ	57.49%	5,822	8,802	1,942	398	–	–	–	16,964
Mégantic-Compton	PLQ	PLQ	9,204	45.09%	2,034	9.97%	PQ	ADQ	60.70%	9,204	7,170	3,268	769	–	–	–	20,411
Mercier	PQ	QS	8,597	37.89%	810	3.57%	PQ	PLQ	56.02%	4,842	7,787	565	8,597	818	–	83	22,692
Mille-Îles	PLQ	PLQ	15,628	46.76%	3,456	10.34%	PQ	ADQ	60.66%	15,628	12,172	3,585	901	905	230	–	33,421
Mirabel	ADQ	PQ	13,700	47.41%	6,493	22.47%	PLQ	ADQ	58.65%	7,207	13,700	6,522	621	847	–	–	28,897
Montmagny-L'Islet	ADQ	PLQ	10,027	51.78%	4,395	22.69%	ADQ	PQ	61.28%	10,027	3,058	5,632	293	356	–	–	19,366
Montmorency	ADQ	PLQ	12,536	36.53%	1,101	3.21%	ADQ	PQ	64.48%	12,536	8,788	11,435	711	690	–	153	34,313
Mont-Royal	PLQ	PLQ	12,234	76.32%	10,378	64.74%	PQ	PVQ	38.79%	12,234	1,856	557	577	737	–	69	16,030
Nelligan	PLQ	PLQ	18,251	72.19%	14,595	57.73%	PQ	PVQ	47.04%	18,251	3,656	1,434	379	1,562	–	–	25,282
Nicolet-Yamaska	ADQ	PQ	8,131	35.24%	175	0.76%	PLQ	ADQ	67.38%	7,956	8,131	6,044	940	–	–	–	23,071
Notre-Dame-de-Grâce	PLQ	PLQ	11,475	67.97%	9,045	53.57%	PVQ	PQ	43.02%	11,475	2,307	483	–	2,430	64	124	16,883
Orford	PLQ	PLQ	14,709	43.40%	2,193	6.47%	PQ	ADQ	61.65%	14,709	12,516	4,516	1,128	1,026	–	–	33,895
Outremont	PLQ	PLQ	10,569	54.21%	5,649	28.97%	PQ	QS	48.49%	10,569	4,920	577	2,228	1,204	–	–	19,498
Papineau	PLQ	PLQ	13,786	51.10%	5,112	18.95%	PQ	ADQ	48.94%	13,786	8,674	2,825	805	795	–	92	26,977
Pointe-aux-Trembles	PQ	PQ	12,851	56.87%	7,271	32.17%	PLQ	ADQ	56.66%	5,580	12,851	2,535	664	733	159	77	22,599
Pontiac	PLQ	PLQ	12,960	66.10%	9,409	47.99%	PQ	ADQ	41.37%	12,960	3,551	1,225	809	940	–	123	19,608
Portneuf	ADQ	PLQ	11,205	39.63%	1,706	6.03%	ADQ	PQ	63.63%	11,205	6,631	9,499	938	–	–	–	28,273
Prévost	ADQ	PQ	14,946	44.34%	5,224	15.50%	PLQ	ADQ	57.74%	9,722	14,946	7,057	1,079	902	–	–	33,706
René-Lévesque	PQ	PQ	10,748	58.43%	5,866	31.89%	PLQ	ADQ	54.43%	4,882	10,748	2,250	516	–	–	–	18,396
Richelieu	PQ	PQ	11,591	46.99%	3,039	12.32%	PLQ	ADQ	61.75%	8,552	11,591	3,126	705	693	–	–	24,667
Richmond	PLQ	PLQ	11,658	51.50%	5,123	22.63%	PQ	ADQ	63.02%	11,658	6,535	3,682	760	–	–	–	22,635
Rimouski	PQ	PQ	12,973	48.45%	3,549	13.26%	PLQ	ADQ	62.08%	9,424	12,973	3,410	967	–	–	–	26,774
Rivière-du-Loup	ADQ	ADQ	11,115	51.77%	5,320	24.78%	PLQ	PQ	63.98%	5,795	3,048	11,115	400	513	597	–	21,468
Robert-Baldwin	PLQ	PLQ	17,078	81.07%	15,476	73.47%	PQ	PVQ	41.52%	17,078	1,602	877	375	1,059	–	74	21,065
Roberval	PQ	PQ	12,522	46.42%	1,825	6.77%	PLQ	ADQ	60.63%	10,697	12,522	2,630	561	–	–	567	26,977
Rosemont	PQ	PQ	15,220	50.66%	5,663	18.85%	PLQ	QS	58.67%	9,557	15,220	1,891	2,470	816	–	88	30,042
Rousseau	PQ	PQ	16,513	56.77%	10,019	34.45%	PLQ	ADQ	54.02%	6,494	16,513	4,774	709	595	–	–	29,085
Rouyn-Noranda-Témiscamingue	PQ	PLQ	10,358	42.30%	1,754	7.16%	PQ	ADQ	57.56%	10,358	8,604	4,111	1,413	–	–	–	24,486
Sainte-Marie-Saint-Jacques	PQ	PQ	9,236	46.62%	3,646	18.40%	PLQ	QS	47.24%	5,590	9,236	796	3,051	1,062	–	76	19,811
Saint-François	PLQ	PLQ	13,172	46.68%	1,346	4.77%	PQ	ADQ	62.56%	13,172	11,826	2,240	769	–	210	–	28,217
Saint-Henri-Sainte-Anne	PLQ	PLQ	10,552	45.85%	2,017	8.76%	PQ	QS	44.76%	10,552	8,535	1,326	1,471	985	–	146	23,015
Saint-Hyacinthe	ADQ	PQ	11,822	38.07%	213	0.69%	PLQ	ADQ	63.44%	11,609	11,822	5,693	956	975	–	–	31,055
Saint-Jean	ADQ	PQ	13,534	39.20%	914	2.65%	PLQ	ADQ	62.01%	12,620	13,534	6,263	767	1,035	118	189	34,526
Saint-Laurent	PLQ	PLQ	15,663	74.39%	12,158	57.74%	PQ	ADQ	40.89%	15,663	3,505	1,009	731	–	–	147	21,055
Saint-Maurice	ADQ	PQ	8,835	41.41%	653	3.06%	PLQ	ADQ	59.50%	8,182	8,835	3,161	432	449	279	–	21,338
Shefford	ADQ	ADQ	11,271	34.63%	70	0.22%	PLQ	PQ	58.88%	11,201	8,019	11,271	1,085	789	181	–	32,546
Sherbrooke	PLQ	PLQ	13,694	45.24%	2,314	7.64%	PQ	ADQ	62.61%	13,694	11,380	2,074	1,948	1,016	158	–	30,270
Soulanges	PLQ	PLQ	11,561	46.29%	2,332	9.34%	PQ	ADQ	59.14%	11,561	9,229	2,992	459	736	–	–	24,977
Taillon	PQ	PQ	15,031	46.35%	4,340	13.38%	PLQ	ADQ	58.63%	10,691	15,031	3,889	1,374	1,094	–	349	32,428
Taschereau	PQ	PQ	11,768	44.22%	3,923	14.74%	PLQ	ADQ	56.96%	7,845	11,768	3,563	2,241	1,048	–	149	26,614
Terrebonne	ADQ	PQ	15,475	45.22%	6,061	17.71%	PLQ	ADQ	60.47%	9,414	15,475	7,381	892	1,056	–	–	34,218
Trois-Rivières	ADQ	PLQ	9,129	40.10%	960	4.22%	PQ	ADQ	60.46%	9,129	8,169	4,241	714	515	–	–	22,768
Ungava	PQ	PQ	4,119	47.30%	1,104	12.68%	PLQ	ADQ	36.09%	3,015	4,119	918	439	–	218	–	8,709
Vachon	PQ	PQ	13,312	48.64%	4,477	16.36%	PLQ	ADQ	61.48%	8,835	13,312	3,742	613	866	–	–	27,368
Vanier	ADQ	PLQ	13,077	38.31%	469	1.37%	ADQ	PQ	62.20%	13,077	7,521	12,608	932	–	–	–	34,138
Vaudreuil	PLQ	PLQ	15,827	54.02%	7,026	23.98%	PQ	ADQ	57.33%	15,827	8,801	2,599	543	1,086	305	140	29,301
Verchères	PQ	PQ	15,664	55.42%	9,200	32.55%	PLQ	ADQ	64.59%	6,464	15,664	4,377	749	845	–	164	28,263
Verdun	PLQ	PLQ	11,223	47.70%	2,909	12.36%	PQ	ADQ	50.62%	11,223	8,314	1,411	1,215	1,087	277	–	23,527
Viau	PLQ	PLQ	10,705	58.60%	5,922	32.42%	PQ	ADQ	44.52%	10,705	4,783	1,186	915	678	–	–	18,267
Vimont	PLQ	PLQ	16,217	47.78%	3,960	11.67%	PQ	ADQ	60.35%	16,217	12,257	3,932	1,537	–	–	–	33,943
Westmount-Saint-Louis	PLQ	PLQ	11,108	75.17%	9,581	64.83%	PQ	PVQ	36.81%	11,108	1,527	434	615	1,094	–	–	14,778

= open seat
= turnout is above provincial average
= winning candidate was in previous Legislature
= incumbent had switched allegiance
= previously incumbent in another riding
= not incumbent; was previously elected to the Legislature
= incumbency arose from byelection gain
= other incumbents renominated
= previously an MP in the House of Commons of Canada
= multiple candidates

=== Comparative analysis for ridings (2008 vs 2007) ===
Summary of riding results by turnout and vote share for winning candidate (vs 2007)
Riding and winning party			Turnout		Vote share	
Riding and winning party			%	Change (pp)	%	Change (pp)
Abitibi-Est	PLQ	Gain	58.73	-9.05	45.74	11.30
Abitibi-Ouest	PQ	Hold	57.06	-13.70	57.32	8.94
Acadie	PLQ	Hold	46.91	-15.12	67.16	7.08
Anjou	PLQ	Hold	58.88	-13.16	50.44	9.08
Argenteuil	PLQ	Hold	54.17	-14.35	49.58	11.99
Arthabaska	PLQ	Gain	63.96	-12.04	42.55	12.04
Beauce-Nord	ADQ	Hold	63.86	-14.05	49.92	-12.70
Beauce-Sud	PLQ	Gain	59.99	-14.10	43.62	13.43
Beauharnois	PQ	Hold	61.00	-13.09	47.15	6.08
Bellechasse	PLQ	Gain	64.35	-12.42	47.66	13.31
Berthier	PQ	Gain	60.43	-12.31	42.50	7.77
Bertrand	PQ	Hold	58.04	-13.06	49.12	12.11
Blainville	PQ	Gain	60.91	-17.09	40.52	7.06
Bonaventure	PLQ	Hold	58.02	-9.79	64.23	11.34
Borduas	PQ	Hold	65.87	-13.72	47.66	8.90
Bourassa-Sauvé	PLQ	Hold	47.68	-15.43	61.33	11.24
Bourget	PQ	Hold	55.56	-14.33	50.19	8.94
Brome-Missisquoi	PLQ	Hold	60.39	-11.49	49.24	9.40
Chambly	PQ	Gain	66.62	-12.95	40.01	11.17
Champlain	PQ	Gain	64.38	-12.16	40.98	10.28
Chapleau	PLQ	Hold	47.96	-14.01	54.71	9.68
Charlesbourg	PLQ	Gain	65.79	-13.08	42.36	15.04
Charlevoix	PQ	Hold	61.01	-12.98	52.21	14.55
Châteauguay	PLQ	Hold	58.26	-15.60	41.49	4.08
Chauveau	ADQ	Hold	61.63	-15.88	42.75	-12.84
Chicoutimi	PQ	Hold	63.71	-12.73	45.96	5.98
Chomedey	PLQ	Hold	45.21	-17.69	66.12	11.37
Chutes-de-la-Chaudière	ADQ	Hold	67.16	-14.22	44.77	-14.15
Crémazie	PQ	Hold	62.29	-11.54	45.13	9.13
D'Arcy-McGee	PLQ	Hold	38.89	-14.20	88.75	4.54
Deux-Montagnes	PQ	Gain	61.03	-15.34	43.14	10.13
Drummond	PQ	Gain	59.30	-12.49	34.40	1.89
Dubuc	PLQ	Gain	60.65	-12.58	42.78	16.50
Duplessis	PQ	Hold	50.26	-12.68	52.35	7.60
Fabre	PLQ	Hold	57.08	-16.25	45.50	10.63
Frontenac	PLQ	Hold	63.58	-13.52	56.71	15.64
Gaspé	PLQ	Gain	58.17	-9.86	56.25	18.71
Gatineau	PLQ	Hold	49.48	-13.93	59.80	14.85
Gouin	PQ	Hold	58.03	-12.06	41.18	3.93
Groulx	PQ	Gain	61.33	-14.01	37.62	8.73
Hochelaga-Maisonneuve	PQ	Hold	47.82	-14.36	54.31	1.59
Hull	PLQ	Hold	47.72	-13.55	51.27	8.74
Huntingdon	PLQ	Gain	57.81	-13.10	44.33	12.78
Iberville	PQ	Gain	61.62	-14.50	41.28	14.05
Îles-de-la-Madeleine	PLQ	Gain	66.35	-9.75	49.85	16.75
Jacques-Cartier	PLQ	Hold	52.77	-14.58	80.85	10.62
Jean-Lesage	PLQ	Gain	58.60	-14.05	41.68	12.40
Jeanne-Mance-Viger	PLQ	Hold	46.95	-16.31	73.05	5.05
Jean-Talon	PLQ	Hold	69.07	-10.90	49.71	7.75
Johnson	PQ	Gain	63.02	-11.99	40.21	4.75
Joliette	PQ	Gain	62.60	-12.16	46.09	11.02
Jonquière	PQ	Hold	62.52	-12.35	47.68	8.35
Kamouraska-Témiscouata	PLQ	Hold	60.55	-11.84	53.70	13.98
La Prairie	PQ	Gain	63.62	-13.88	44.83	14.05
Labelle	PQ	Hold	55.01	-13.97	53.50	8.08
Lac-Saint-Jean	PQ	Hold	63.20	-14.12	55.62	9.19
LaFontaine	PLQ	Hold	51.16	-16.22	69.76	7.30
Lapeltrie	ADQ	Hold	65.36	-14.39	39.17	-11.89
Lapinière	PLQ	Hold	52.17	-14.35	61.44	11.01
Laporte	PLQ	Hold	58.05	-12.87	48.97	8.00
L'Assomption	PQ	Gain	63.21	-12.95	42.77	8.84
Laurier-Dorion	PLQ	Hold	49.16	-16.22	42.90	3.24
Laval-des-Rapides	PLQ	Hold	55.11	-14.56	44.07	9.66
Laviolette	PLQ	Hold	58.72	-13.87	59.06	18.07
Lévis	PLQ	Gain	64.13	-15.21	38.65	13.45
Lotbinière	ADQ	Hold	65.01	-13.05	43.98	-15.24
Louis-Hébert	PLQ	Hold	70.35	-10.98	48.85	14.30
Marguerite-Bourgeoys	PLQ	Hold	48.09	-15.05	66.19	9.06
Marguerite-D'Youville	PQ	Gain	71.39	-11.24	39.75	8.69
Marie-Victorin	PQ	Hold	53.29	-15.26	51.56	11.96
Marquette	PLQ	Hold	49.09	-15.28	56.21	8.44
Maskinongé	PLQ	Gain	64.25	-12.08	42.25	13.25
Masson	PQ	Gain	57.10	-17.20	50.68	14.75
Matane	PQ	Hold	59.60	-12.67	58.01	18.91
Matapédia	PQ	Hold	57.49	-12.90	51.89	8.19
Mégantic-Compton	PLQ	Hold	60.70	-13.00	45.09	12.12
Mercier	QS	Gain	56.02	-13.30	37.89	8.51
Mille-Îles	PLQ	Hold	60.66	-15.27	46.76	8.02
Mirabel	PQ	Gain	58.65	-16.63	47.41	13.33
Montmagny-L'Islet	PLQ	Gain	61.28	-11.36	51.78	13.59
Montmorency	PLQ	Gain	64.48	-13.50	36.53	13.92
Mont-Royal	PLQ	Hold	38.79	-15.66	76.32	5.82
Nelligan	PLQ	Hold	47.04	-17.11	72.19	8.37
Nicolet-Yamaska	PQ	Gain	67.38	-10.35	35.24	6.92
Notre-Dame-de-Grâce	PLQ	Hold	43.02	-15.50	67.97	6.54
Orford	PLQ	Hold	61.65	-12.43	43.40	10.11
Outremont	PLQ	Hold	48.49	-14.19	54.21	7.18
Papineau	PLQ	Hold	48.94	-15.68	51.10	12.05
Pointe-aux-Trembles	PQ	Hold	56.66	-16.25	56.87	9.56
Pontiac	PLQ	Hold	41.37	-15.16	66.10	7.55
Portneuf	PLQ	Gain	63.63	-13.90	39.63	7.45
Prévost	PQ	Gain	57.74	-14.53	44.34	7.02
René-Lévesque	PQ	Hold	54.43	-14.18	58.43	6.65
Richelieu	PQ	Hold	61.75	-13.36	46.99	8.96
Richmond	PLQ	Hold	63.02	-11.50	51.50	9.19
Rimouski	PQ	Hold	62.08	-12.19	48.45	7.88
Rivière-du-Loup	ADQ	Hold	63.98	-14.29	51.77	-6.70
Robert-Baldwin	PLQ	Hold	41.52	-17.10	81.07	6.32
Roberval	PQ	Hold	60.63	-12.07	46.42	4.67
Rosemont	PQ	Hold	58.67	-12.20	50.66	12.06
Rousseau	PQ	Hold	54.02	-15.01	56.77	15.00
Rouyn-Noranda-Témiscamingue	PLQ	Gain	57.56	-10.61	42.30	9.64
Saint-François	PLQ	Hold	62.56	-11.24	46.68	8.82
Saint-Henri-Sainte-Anne	PLQ	Hold	44.76	-16.28	45.85	7.36
Saint-Hyacinthe	PQ	Gain	63.44	-12.92	38.07	5.89
Saint-Jean	PQ	Gain	62.01	-13.02	39.20	9.93
Saint-Laurent	PLQ	Hold	40.89	-16.98	74.39	6.58
Saint-Maurice	PQ	Gain	59.50	-13.07	41.41	8.68
Sainte-Marie-Saint-Jacques	PQ	Hold	47.24	-13.62	46.62	5.28
Shefford	ADQ	Hold	58.88	-14.17	34.63	-7.48
Sherbrooke	PLQ	Hold	62.61	-11.62	45.24	8.68
Soulanges	PLQ	Hold	59.14	-14.82	46.29	10.26
Taillon	PQ	Hold	58.63	-13.20	46.35	10.88
Taschereau	PQ	Hold	56.96	-13.59	44.22	7.11
Terrebonne	PQ	Gain	60.47	-16.04	45.22	8.91
Trois-Rivières	PLQ	Gain	60.46	-13.03	40.10	11.56
Ungava	PQ	Hold	36.09	-10.38	47.30	5.89
Vachon	PQ	Hold	61.48	-13.72	48.64	13.76
Vanier	PLQ	Gain	62.20	-14.15	38.31	14.12
Vaudreuil	PLQ	Hold	57.33	-15.25	54.02	9.82
Verchères	PQ	Hold	64.59	-13.88	55.42	14.18
Verdun	PLQ	Hold	50.62	-13.83	47.70	6.76
Viau	PLQ	Hold	44.52	-14.81	58.60	6.69
Vimont	PLQ	Hold	60.35	-15.78	47.78	11.81
Westmount-Saint-Louis	PLQ	Hold	36.81	-12.42	75.17	7.58

=== Seats that changed hands ===
Elections to the National Assembly – seats won/lost by party, 2007–2008
Party	2007	Gain from (loss to)								2008
Party	2007	PLQ		PQ		ADQ		QS		2008
Liberal	48			5		13				66
Parti Québécois	36		(5)			21			(1)	51
Action démocratique	41		(13)		(21)					7
Québec solidaire	–			1						1
Total	125	–	(18)	6	(21)	34	–	–	(1)	125

=== Summary analysis ===
Party candidates in 2nd place
Party in 1st place	Party in 2nd place					Total
Party in 1st place	Lib	PQ	ADQ	QS	PVQ	Total
Liberal		54	9		3	66
Parti Québécois	50			1		51
Action démocratique	7					7
Québec solidaire		1				1
Total	57	55	9	1	3	125

Candidates ranked 1st to 5th place, by party
Parties	1st	2nd	3rd	4th	5th
█ Liberal	66	57	2		
█ Parti Québécois	51	55	19		
█ Action démocratique	7	9	92	11	6
█ Québec solidaire	1	1	7	73	39
█ Green		3	5	37	35
█ Independent				1	10
█ Marxist–Leninist				1	3
█ Parti indépendantiste				1	2
█ Parti durable				1	

Resulting composition of the National Assembly (2008)
Source		Party				
Source		Lib	PQ	ADQ	QS	Total
Seats retained	Incumbents returned	43	27	6		76
Seats retained	Open seats held - new MNAs	5	2	1		8
Seats retained	Open seats held - previous MNA returned		1			1
Seats changing hands	Incumbents defeated - new MNAs	9	18		1	28
Seats changing hands	Incumbents defeated - previous MNAs returned	6	3			9
Seats changing hands	Open seats gained	3				3
Total		66	51	7	1	125

== See also ==
- 39th National Assembly of Quebec
- Liste de sondages sur les élections générales québécoises de 2008 Opinion polling for the 2008 Quebec general election
- Politics of Quebec
- List of premiers of Quebec
- List of leaders of the Official Opposition (Quebec)
- National Assembly of Quebec
- Timeline of Quebec history
- Political parties in Quebec
