= Bertrand (1981–1994 electoral district) =

Quebec electoral district

Defunct provincial electoral district
- Legislature: National Assembly of Quebec
- District created: 1980
- District abolished: 1992
- First contested: 1981
- Last contested: 1989

Bertrand (French pronunciation: [bɛʁtʁɑ̃]) was the name of a defunct provincial electoral district in the province of Quebec, Canada. It was located in the Montérégie region, and is not to be confused with the later, entirely different Bertrand electoral district located in the Lanaudière and Laurentides regions, which re-used the name but otherwise has nothing in common.

It was created for the 1981 election from parts of the existing Chambly and Verchères districts. Its final election was in 1989. It disappeared in the 1994 election and its successor electoral district was Marguerite-D'Youville.

It was in this electoral district that Robert Bourassa was elected in a by-election on June 3, 1985, as part of his political comeback after returning as Quebec Liberal Party leader, only to be defeated by the Parti Québécois candidate in the 1985 general election six months later. Bourassa subsequently ran in a by-election in Saint-Laurent on January 20, 1986, and won there.

== Members of National Assembly ==
1. Denis Lazure, Parti Québécois (1981–1984)
2. Robert Bourassa, Liberal (1985 by-election)
3. Jean-Guy Parent, Parti Québécois (1985–1989)
4. François Beaulne, Parti Québécois (1989–1994)

== Election results ==
Quebec provincial by-election, June 3, 1985
Party	Candidate	Votes	%
Liberal	Robert Bourassa	15,490	57.97
Parti Québécois	Francine Lalonde	10,217	38.23
Independent	Joseph Arthur Laurent Alie	408	1.53
United Social Credit	Joseph Ranger	182	0.68
Commonwealth of Canada	Paul Rochon	162	0.61
Non-Affiliated	Carolle Caron	135	0.51
Non-Affiliated	Patricia Métivier	129	0.48
Total valid votes		26,723	
Rejected and declined votes		567	
Turnout		27,290	68.61
Electors on the lists		39,776	
Source: Official Results, Government of Quebec
