= Filomena Rotiroti =

Canadian politician

Filomena Rotiroti MNA
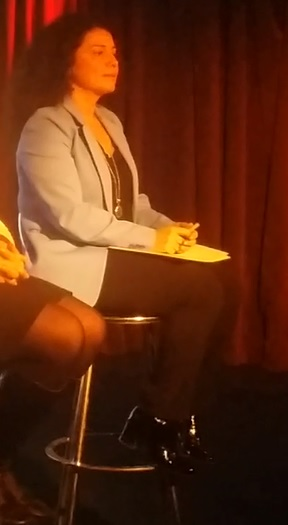
- Filomena Rotiroti, is a Canadian politician.

Member of the National Assembly of Quebec for Jeanne-Mance–Viger
- Incumbent
- Assumed office December 8, 2008
- Preceded by: Michel Bissonnet

Personal details
- Born: May 17, 1974 (age 52) Montreal, Quebec
- Party: Liberal

Filomena Rotiroti (born May 17, 1974) is a Canadian politician. Rotiroti was elected to represent the riding of Jeanne-Mance–Viger in the National Assembly of Quebec in the 2008 provincial election. She was re-elected in 2012, 2014, 2018, and 2022. She is a member of the Quebec Liberal Party. She is currently the Chief Whip of the Official Opposition. As of September 7, 2024, she serves as critic for Regional Economic Development and Metropolis. Prior to her election to office, she worked as a chief of staff to her caucus colleague Lise Thériault. She also worked as counsellor for the Minister of Economic and Regional Development.

== Electoral record ==
2022 Quebec general election: Jeanne-Mance-Viger
Party	Candidate	Votes	%	±%
Liberal	Filomena Rotiroti	14,471	53.93	-12.39
Coalition Avenir Québec	Julie De Martino	4,455	16.60	+0.52
Conservative	Chakib Saad	3,113	11.60	+10.18
Québec solidaire	Marie-Josée Forget	2,858	10.65	+2.50
Parti Québécois	Laurence Massey	1,122	4.18	-1.37
Canadian	Giovanni Manfredi	496	1.85	+1.85
Green	Alessandra Szilagyi	319	1.19	-0.89
Total valid votes		26,834	98.19	
Total rejected ballots		495	1.81	-0.11
Turnout		27,329	55.01	-0.26
Electors on the lists		49,683		
Liberal hold		Swing		–

2018 Quebec general election: Jeanne-Mance-Viger
Party	Candidate	Votes	%	±%
Liberal	Filomena Rotiroti	18,215	66.32	-12.21
Coalition Avenir Québec	Sarah Petrari	4,445	16.18	+7.98
Québec solidaire	Ismaël Seck	2,237	8.15	+4.79
Parti Québécois	Marie-Josée Bruneau	1,523	5.55	-3.05
Green	Sylvie Hétu	570	2.08	+0.98
Conservative	Sylvain Dallaire	391	1.42	
Marxist–Leninist	Garnet Colly	83	0.3	+0.09
Total valid votes		27,464	98.08	
Total rejected ballots		538	1.92	
Turnout		28,002	55.27	
Eligible voters		50,660		
Liberal hold		Swing		-10.095
Source(s) "Rapport des résultats officiels du scrutin". Élections Québec.

2014 Quebec general election
Party	Candidate	Votes	%	±%
Liberal	Filomena Rotiroti	27,007	78.53	+13.14
Parti Québécois	Joanie Harnois	2,956	8.60	-4.83
Coalition Avenir Québec	Mario Parent	2,820	8.20	-6.32
Québec solidaire	Stéphanie Charpentier	1,154	3.36	-1.70
Green	Melissa Miscione	379	1.10	–
Marxist–Leninist	Garnet Colly	73	0.21	-0.12
Total valid votes		34,389	98.97	–
Total rejected ballots		394	1.13	–
Turnout		34,783	71	+3.59
Electors on the lists		48,925	–	–
Liberal hold		Swing		–

2012 Quebec general election
Party	Candidate	Votes	%	±%
Liberal	Filomena Rotiroti	20,912	65.39	-7.66
Coalition Avenir Québec	Jean-François Gagné	4,643	14.52	+6.85
Parti Québécois	Nicolas Bonami	4,295	13.43	-1.59
Québec solidaire	Marie-Chantal Locas	1,618	5.06	+2.60
Option nationale	Julie Surprenant	410	1.28	–
Marxist–Leninist	Garnet Colly	104	0.33	-0.23
Total valid votes		31,982	98.71	–
Total rejected ballots		419	1.29	–
Turnout		32,401	67.41	
Electors on the lists		48,069	–	–

^ Change is from redistributed results. CAQ change is from ADQ.

2008 Quebec general election
Party	Candidate	Votes	%	±%
Liberal	Filomena Rotiroti	16433	73.05	
Parti Québécois	Christine Normandin	3379	15.02	
Action démocratique	Luigi Verrelli	1726	7.67	
Québec solidaire	Celine Gingras	554	2.46	
Independent	Katia Proulx	281	1.25	
People's Front	Garnet Colly	124	0.55	
	Total valid votes	22,497	98.57	
	Total rejected ballots	326	1.43	
	Turnout	22,823	46.95	
	Electors on the lists	48,609		
