= Jeanne-Mance–Viger =

Provincial electoral district in Quebec, Canada

Coordinates: 45.5908°N 73.5980°W

Quebec electoral district
- Location in Montreal

Provincial electoral district
- Legislature: National Assembly of Quebec
MNA
Filomena Rotiroti
Liberal
- District created: 2001
- First contested: 2003
- Last contested: 2026

Demographics
- Electors (2021): 49,517
- Area (km²): 13.5
- Census division: Montreal (part)
- Census subdivision: Montreal (part)

Jeanne-Mance–Viger is a provincial electoral district in the Montreal region of Quebec, Canada, that elects one member to the National Assembly of Quebec. It corresponds exactly to the territory of the Saint-Léonard borough of the city of Montreal. The current MNA is Filomenna Rotiroti who was first elected in 2008.

It was created for the 2003 election from Jeanne-Mance and part of Viger and has remained a Liberal stronghold ever since. It is the safest Liberal electoral district in Montreal's east end.

Its territory has remained unchanged from its creation back in 2001. It borders the electoral districts of Viau to west, Anjou-Louis Riel to the east and southeast, Rosemont to the southwest, and Bourassa-Sauve to the north.

It was named for Jeanne Mance and jointly for Denis-Benjamin Viger and Jacques Viger (1787–1858).

== Members of the National Assembly ==
| Legislature | Years | Member | Party |
|---|---|---|---|
Riding created from Jeanne-Mance and Viger
| 37th | 2003–2007 | Michel Bissonnet | Liberal |
| 38th | 2007–2008 | Michel Bissonnet | Liberal |
| 39th | 2008–2012 | Filomena Rotiroti | Liberal |
| 40th | 2012–2014 | Filomena Rotiroti | Liberal |
| 41st | 2014–2018 | Filomena Rotiroti | Liberal |
| 42nd | 2018–2022 | Filomena Rotiroti | Liberal |
| 43rd | 2022–2026 | Filomena Rotiroti | Liberal |
| 44th | 2026–Present | Filomena Rotiroti | Liberal |

== Election results ==
2026 Quebec general election
** Preliminary results — Not yet official **
| Party | Candidate | Votes | % | ±% |
|---|---|---|---|---|
| Liberal | Filomena Rotiroti | 17,357 | 64.06 | +10.13 |
| Québec solidaire | Dalila Assefsaf | 3,307 | 12.20 | +1.55 |
| Conservative | Chakib Saad | 2,622 | 9.68 | –1.92 |
| Parti Québécois | Adnane Najahi | 2,266 | 8.36 | +4.18 |
| Coalition Avenir Québec | Ernest Denon | 1,204 | 4.44 | –12.16 |
| Green | Younes Gouriny | 175 | 0.65 | –0.54 |
| Canadian | Djaouida Sellah | 165 | 0.61 | –1.24 |
| Total valid votes | | 27,096 | 97.79 | –0.40 |
| Total rejected ballots | | 613 | 2.21 | +0.40 |
| Turnout | | 27,709 | 55.32 | +0.31 |
| Electors on the lists | | 50,087 | | |
| Liberal hold | | Swing | | +4.29 |
Source: Élections Québec

2022 Quebec general election
| Party | Candidate | Votes | % | ±% |
|---|---|---|---|---|
| Liberal | Filomena Rotiroti | 14,471 | 53.93 | -12.39 |
| Coalition Avenir Québec | Julie De Martino | 4,455 | 16.60 | +0.52 |
| Conservative | Chakib Saad | 3,113 | 11.60 | +10.18 |
| Québec solidaire | Marie-Josée Forget | 2,858 | 10.65 | +2.50 |
| Parti Québécois | Laurence Massey | 1,122 | 4.18 | -1.37 |
| Canadian | Giovanni Manfredi | 496 | 1.85 | +1.85 |
| Green | Alessandra Szilagyi | 319 | 1.19 | -0.89 |
| Total valid votes | | 26,834 | 98.19 | |
| Total rejected ballots | | 495 | 1.81 | -0.11 |
| Turnout | | 27,329 | 55.01 | -0.26 |
| Electors on the lists | | 49,683 | | |
| Liberal hold | | Swing | | – |

2018 Quebec general election
| Party | Candidate | Votes | % | ±% |
|---|---|---|---|---|
| Liberal | Filomena Rotiroti | 18,215 | 66.32 | -12.21 |
| Coalition Avenir Québec | Sarah Petrari | 4,445 | 16.18 | +7.98 |
| Québec solidaire | Ismaël Seck | 2,237 | 8.15 | +4.79 |
| Parti Québécois | Marie-Josée Bruneau | 1,523 | 5.55 | -3.05 |
| Green | Sylvie Hétu | 570 | 2.08 | +0.98 |
| Conservative | Sylvain Dallaire | 391 | 1.42 | |
| Marxist–Leninist | Garnet Colly | 83 | 0.3 | +0.09 |
| Total valid votes | | 27,464 | 98.08 | |
| Total rejected ballots | | 538 | 1.92 | |
| Turnout | | 28,002 | 55.27 | |
| Eligible voters | | 50,660 | | |
| Liberal hold | | Swing | | -10.095 |
Source(s) "Rapport des résultats officiels du scrutin". Élections Québec.

2014 Quebec general election
| Party | Candidate | Votes | % | ±% |
|---|---|---|---|---|
| Liberal | Filomena Rotiroti | 27,007 | 78.53 | +13.14 |
| Parti Québécois | Joanie Harnois | 2,956 | 8.60 | -4.83 |
| Coalition Avenir Québec | Mario Parent | 2,820 | 8.20 | -6.32 |
| Québec solidaire | Stéphanie Charpentier | 1,154 | 3.36 | -1.70 |
| Green | Melissa Miscione | 379 | 1.10 | – |
| Marxist–Leninist | Garnet Colly | 73 | 0.21 | -0.12 |
| Total valid votes | | 34,389 | 98.97 | – |
| Total rejected ballots | | 394 | 1.13 | – |
| Turnout | | 34,783 | 71 | +3.59 |
| Electors on the lists | | 48,925 | – | – |
| Liberal hold | | Swing | | – |

2012 Quebec general election
| Party | Candidate | Votes | % | ±% |
|---|---|---|---|---|
| Liberal | Filomena Rotiroti | 20,912 | 65.39 | -7.66 |
| Coalition Avenir Québec | Jean-François Gagné | 4,643 | 14.52 | +6.85 |
| Parti Québécois | Nicolas Bonami | 4,295 | 13.43 | -1.59 |
| Québec solidaire | Marie-Chantal Locas | 1,618 | 5.06 | +2.60 |
| Option nationale | Julie Surprenant | 410 | 1.28 | – |
| Marxist–Leninist | Garnet Colly | 104 | 0.33 | -0.23 |
| Total valid votes | | 31,982 | 98.71 | – |
| Total rejected ballots | | 419 | 1.29 | – |
| Turnout | | 32,401 | 67.41 | |
| Electors on the lists | | 48,069 | – | – |

^ Change is from redistributed results. CAQ change is from ADQ.

2008 Quebec general election
| Party | | Candidate | Votes | % | ±% |
|---|---|---|---|---|---|
| | Liberal | Filomena Rotiroti | 16433 | 73.05 | |
| | Parti Québécois | Christine Normandin | 3379 | 15.02 | |
| | Action démocratique | Luigi Verrelli | 1726 | 7.67 | |
| | Québec solidaire | Celine Gingras | 554 | 2.46 | |
| } | Independent | Katia Proulx | 281 | 1.25 | |
| | People's Front | Garnet Colly | 124 | 0.55 | |
| | | Total valid votes | 22,497 | 98.57 | |
| | | Total rejected ballots | 326 | 1.43 | |
| | | Turnout | 22,823 | 46.95 | |
| | | Electors on the lists | 48,609 | | |

2007 Quebec general election
| Party | Candidate | Votes | % | ±% |
|---|---|---|---|---|
| Liberal | Michel Bissonnet | 20716 | 68.00 | -11.89 |
| Action démocratique | Carole Giroux | 4565 | 14.98 | +8.78 |
| Parti Québécois | Kamal El Batal | 3659 | 12.01 | -0.82 |
| Green | Hamadou Abdel Kader Nikiema | 790 | 2.59 | – |
| Québec solidaire | Ramon Villaruel | 635 | 2.08 | |
| People's Front | Stéphane Chénier | 101 | 0.33 | |
| | Total valid votes | 30,466 | 98.87 | |
| | Total rejected ballots | 349 | 1.13 | |
| | Turnout | 30,815 | 63.26 | |
| | Electors on the lists | 48,710 | | |

2003 Quebec general election
| Party | Candidate | Votes | % | ±% |
|---|---|---|---|---|
| Liberal | Michel Bissonnet | 26801 | 79.89 | |
| Parti Québécois | Robert La Rose | 4303 | 12.83 | |
| Action démocratique | Carole Giroux | 2080 | 6.20 | |
| Bloc Pot | Eddy Guarino | 365 | 1.09 | |

== See also ==
- List of Quebec provincial electoral districts
- Canadian provincial electoral districts
