= François Beaulne =

Canadian politician

Member of the National Assembly for Marguerite-D'Youville Bertrand (1989–1994)
- In office September 25, 1989 – April 14, 2003
- Preceded by: Jean-Guy Parent
- Succeeded by: Pierre Moreau

Personal details
- Born: November 28, 1946 (age 79) Ottawa, Ontario
- Party: New Democratic Party (federal); Parti Québécois (provincial)
- Profession: Economist, diplomat

François Beaulne (born November 28, 1946) is a Quebec politician, he is the son of diplomats Yvon Beaulne and Thérèse Pratte.

== Biography ==
Beaulne earned two master's degree from the University of Ottawa, in political science and in business administration, finance and commerce. He also has a doctorate in international relations from Columbia University.

He taught economics at the University of Ottawa. He then worked at the Consul of Canada in San Francisco from 1974 to 1978 and at the Department of External Affairs of Canada from 1978 to 1980. He became vice-president, international affairs, at the National Bank of Canada from 1980 to 1986. He returned to teaching at the Université du Québec à Montréal from 1987 until 1989.

== Political career ==
While at the University of Ottawa, he ran for the NDP in the 1972 federal election. Tommy Douglas spoke at his nomination. He lost to Liberal Jean-Robert Gauthier. Later, in Montreal, while teaching, he ran for the NDP in the riding of Laurier-Sainte-Marie in the 1988 federal election, finishing in a strong third place. He caught the attention of Jacques Parizeau, the leader of the Parti Québécois and served as his Senior Economic Advisor.

Beaulne ran in the riding of Bertrand in 1989 and won. He was re-elected in Marguerite-D'Youville in 1994 and served as Parliamentary Assistant to Premier Jacques Parizeau.

Beaulne was re-elected in 1998, he went on to serve as Parliamentary Assistant to the Minister of Citizenship and Immigration in the Lucien Bouchard government. He was Parliamentary Secretary to the Minister of State for International Relations in the Bernard Landry government until becoming the Second Vice President of the National Assembly of Quebec. Beaulne ran for re-election in 2003 but lost narrowly to Pierre Moreau as the Landry Government was turfed from office.

== Diplomatic career ==
After losing his seat, Beaulne went to work at the United Nations and was a political adviser in five countries: Cambodia, Mozambique, Burundi, Côte d'Ivoire and Tunisia. He received the Cambodia Medal of Merit for his contribution to parliamentary democracy.

== Attempted political comeback ==
In 2015, Beaulne sought the NDP nomination for the new riding of Pierre-Boucher—Les Patriotes—Verchères, he lost to Raphaël Fortin.

== Electoral record ==
=== Federal ===
1988 Canadian federal election: Laurier—Sainte-Marie
Party	Candidate	Votes	%	Expenditures
Liberal	Jean-Claude Malepart	15,956	39.07	$41,754
Progressive Conservative	Charles Hamelin	12,113	29.66	$35,391
New Democratic	François Beaulne	8,828	21.62	$42,678
Rhinoceros	Sonia Chatouille Côté	2,121	5.19	$425
Green	Philippe Champagne	1,438	3.52	$0
Communist	Marianne Roy	175	0.43	$1,263
Independent Marxist-Leninist	Hélène Héroux	130	0.32	$130
Commonwealth of Canada	Daniel Gonzales	79	0.19	$0
Total valid votes		40,840	100.00	
Total rejected ballots		729		
Turnout		41,569	69.33	
Electors on the lists		59,956		
Source: Report of the Chief Electoral Officer, Thirty-fourth General Election, 1988.

=== Provincial ===
2003 Quebec general election: Marguerite-D'Youville
Party	Candidate	Votes	%	±%
Liberal	Pierre Moreau	16,368	41.38	+10.84
Parti Québécois	François Beaulne	15,501	39.19	-15.09
Action démocratique	Luc Pommainville	6,596	16.68	+2.95
Bloc Pot	Yan Lacombe	550	1.39	+0.55
UFP	Maxime Babeu	536	1.36	–
Total valid votes		39,551	98.74	
Rejected and declined votes		506	1.26	+0.31
Turnout		40,057	81.93	-4.74
Electors on the lists		48,892		
Source: Official Results, Government of Quebec
Liberal gain from Parti Québécois		Swing		+12.97

1998 Quebec general election: Marguerite-D'Youville
Party	Candidate	Votes	%	±%
Parti Québécois	François Beaulne	21,224	54.28	-3.74
Liberal	Guy Lafrance	11,941	30.54	-7.44
Action démocratique	Nicolas Gaboury	5,370	13.73	–
Bloc Pot	Hugô St-Onge	327	0.84	–
Socialist Democracy	Jonathan Bérubé	240	0.61	–
Total valid votes		39,102	99.05	
Rejected and declined votes		376	0.95	-2.63
Turnout		39,478	86.67	-0.49
Electors on the lists		45,548		
Source: Official Results, Government of Quebec
Parti Québécois hold		Swing		+5.59

1994 Quebec general election: Marguerite-D'Youville
Party	Candidate	Votes	%
Parti Québécois	François Beaulne	19,995	58.02
Liberal	Claude Savaria	13,089	37.98
Green	Jean Dury	822	2.39
Natural Law	Jacinthe Vidal	554	1.61
Total valid votes		34,460	96.42
Rejected and declined votes		1,281	3.58
Turnout		35,741	87.16
Electors on the lists		41,008	
Source: Official Results, Government of Quebec

1989 Quebec general election: Bertrand
Party	Candidate	Votes	%	±%
Parti Québécois	François Beaulne	20,188	53.75	+4.86
Liberal	Estelle Lessard	17,369	46.25	-1.99
Total valid votes		37,557	95.36	
Rejected and declined votes		1,826	4.64	+3.31
Turnout		39,383	81.62	-5.88
Electors on the lists		48,249		
Source: Official Results, Government of Quebec
Parti Québécois hold		Swing		+3.43
