= Mathieu Lavoie =

Quebec politician

Mathieu Lavoie MNA

Member of the National Assembly for Montarville
- Incumbent
- Assumed office October 5, 2026
- Preceded by: Nathalie Roy

Personal details
- Party: Liberal
- Education: Université de Montréal

Mathieu Lavoie is a Quebec politician who was the elected to the National Assembly of Quebec for Montarville in the 2026 Quebec general election as a member of the Quebec Liberal Party (PLQ). He unseated Nathalie Roy from the Coalition Avenir Québec (CAQ). Lavoie is a graduate of the University of Montreal. He is a musician by profession.

== Electoral record ==
2026 Quebec general election: Montarville
The 2026 general election will be held on October 5.
Party	Candidate	Votes	%	±%
Liberal	Mathieu Lavoie	12,775	29.62	
Parti Québécois	Jean-François Cloutier	12,439	28.84	
Coalition Avenir Québec	Nathalie Roy	8,594	19.93	
Québec solidaire	Ginette Langlois	5,046	11.70	
Conservative	Marc Rondeau	3,677	8.53	
Climat Québec	Jean-Simon Bellavance	303	0.70	
Independent	Sylvain Bouchard	188	0.44	
Présence	Annie St-Jacques	105	0.24	
Total valid votes				
Total rejected ballots				
Turnout			80.74	
Electors on the lists				
