= Simon-Pierre Diamond =

Canadian politician (born 1985)

MNA for Marguerite-D'Youville
- In office April 25, 2007 – November 5, 2008
- Preceded by: Pierre Moreau
- Succeeded by: Monique Richard

Personal details
- Born: February 9, 1985 (age 41) Boucherville, Quebec, Canada
- Party: ADQ (2007-2008); Liberal (2010-present)

Simon-Pierre Diamond (born February 9, 1985) is a politician in Quebec, Canada. He represented the Marguerite-D'Youville district in the National Assembly of Quebec from 2007 to 2008 as a member of the Action démocratique du Québec.

From 2004 to 2007, Diamond, a law student at Université de Montréal and a resident of Boucherville, served as President of the Youth Commission of the ADQ. He supports same-sex marriage, but believes that only the federal government has jurisdiction over that issue.

In the 2007 election at age 22, Diamond became the youngest member ever elected to the Quebec legislature, a record he held until the 2012 election of Léo Bureau-Blouin; the previous recordholders had been André Boisclair and Claude Charron.

Diamond was elected with 37% of the vote, defeating PQ candidate Sébastien Gagnon (31%) and Liberal incumbent Pierre Moreau (27%). He took office on April 12, 2007. On April 19, 2007, he was selected to be the Official Opposition's Shadow Minister of Environment and Sustaining Development. He lost his seat in the 2008 election along with 33 other ADQ MNAs, coming in third place in his riding with 18.46% of the vote.

On May 31, 2010, it was announced Diamond had switched to the Liberal Party and would be running for them in the July 5 Vachon by-election. He was defeated in that election by Parti Québécois candidate Martine Ouellet.

Diamond was born in Boucherville, Quebec. His father is a federal Liberal.

== Electoral record ==
Quebec provincial by-election, July 5, 2010: Vachon
Party	Candidate	Votes	%	±%
Parti Québécois	Martine Ouellet	7,863	59.15	+10.51
Liberal	Simon-Pierre Diamond	3,236	24.34	−7.94
Action démocratique	Alain Dépatie	879	6.61	−7.06
Québec solidaire	Sébastien Robert	727	5.47	+3.23
Green	Yvon Rudolphe	419	3.15	−0.01
Independent	Denis Durand	98	0.74	−2.42
Independent	Régent Millette	71	0.53	-
Total valid votes		13,293	100.00	
Rejected and declined votes		174		
Turnout		13,467	29.25	−32.23
Electors on the lists		46,046		

Source: Official Results, Le Directeur général des élections du Québec.

2008 Quebec general election
Party	Candidate	Votes	%	±%
Parti Québécois	Monique Richard	14,533	39.75	+8.70
Liberal	Jean-Robert Grenier	13,119	35.88	+8.68
Action démocratique	Simon-Pierre Diamond	6,750	18.46	-18.61
Green	Thomas Goyette-Levac	1,097	3.00	-
Québec solidaire	Hugo Bergeron	1,064	2.91	-1.76

2007 Quebec general election
Party	Candidate	Votes	%	±%
Action démocratique	Simon-Pierre Diamond	15,536	37.07	+20.39
Parti Québécois	Sébastien Gagnon	13,015	31.05	-8.14
Liberal	Pierre Moreau	11,401	27.20	-14.18
Québec solidaire	Daniel Michelin	1,958	4.67	+3.31*

* Increase is from UFP

== Footnotes ==
Party political offices
Preceded by Micaël Bérubé	President of the Youth Commission of the Action démocratique du Québec; 2004–2007	Succeeded by Catherine Goyer
Political offices
Preceded by Stéphane Bergeron (PQ)	Official Opposition's Shadow Minister of Environment; 2007–2008	Succeeded by Monique Richard (PQ)
