= Parti durable du Québec =

Sustainable Development Party Parti durable du Québec
- Leader: Sebastien Girard
- Founded: 2008
- Dissolved: 2009
- Headquarters: 1114, rue Anne-Hébert; Saint-Félicien (Québec); G8K 1H1
- Ideology: Regionalism; Centrism; Sustainable development

Website
- www.partidurable.org

The Parti durable du Québec (English: Sustainable Development Party) is a political party in Quebec that advocates for regionalism, centrism, and sustainable development.

According to Quebecpolitique.com, the party "was founded in 2008. Its mission is to "defend the interests of the regional population" of (the) Saguenay-Lac-Saint-Jean" region.

== Election 2008 ==
In the 2008 election, party leader Sebastien Girard ran as the party's only candidate in the provincial riding of Roberval. He finished in fifth place with 571 votes (2.1%), tying with the candidate for Québec Solidaire.

== Dissolution ==
In February 2010, Quebec's Chief Electoral Officer released a statement saying that the party had lost its official status as an authorised political party as of November 2009.

== Platform ==
On the party website, Girard laid out the party's platform:

- La Charte du Bois (The Timber Charter):
  - Due to the crisis in the forestry sector in the Saguenay-Lac-Saint-Jean region, the party suggests that a Timber Charter be introduced in the National Assembly. This charter would contain two different agendas:
    - 1. Wood products would be labelled, so that they can be traced, advocating local consumption of wood with a local origin.
    - 2. More use of Quebec wood in the construction of public buildings in Quebec.
- Entrepreneurship and Youth Migration
  - To combat migration and brain drain from the Saguenay region, the party promised:
    - A work-entrepreneurship program, in which entrepreneurs would spend part of the time working and the other part developing their idea or business plan.
    - A student-entrepreneurship program, which would give youth resources for their entrepreneurial ideas.
    - A regional mentoring program, to help foster the two above programs.
- Energy policy
  - Investment in renewable energy sources, more specifically ethanol, biodiesel and methane
  - An energy cooperative for the Saugenay region.
- Education
  - More investment in alternative forms of education.
  - More assessment of students and more resources for teachers
- Food
  - The development of a "Charter of Agricultural Soils"
  - Developing a visibility program for regional products
- Sustainable tourism
  - Investment in a sustainable tourist sector in the Saugenay region
    - Opening Internet access to all citizens in the region, opening tourist-based businesses to the world
    - Developing a tourist cooperative for the Saugenay-Lac-Saint-Jean region.
    - Invest in a circuit of hostels
    - Establishing festivals and activities for the Lac-Saint-Jean region.
    - Making tourist information available in different languages
    - Establishing a rail tour of the area
- First Nations
  - Collaboration with the local Innu community to establish a research centre.
  - Promoting the education of Native Spirituality on reserves and encouraging discussion in public schools
  - Establishing an ethnotourist market in the region.
- Sustainable environment
  - Regulate the burning of wood
  - Accelerate development of electric vehicles
  - Nationalize Quebec water
- Health
  - Recognize and regulate alternative medicines
  - Give more power to graduate nurses
  - Relax admission to those looking at medical school
