= Pierre Moreau =

Canadian politician

The Honourable Pierre Moreau PC
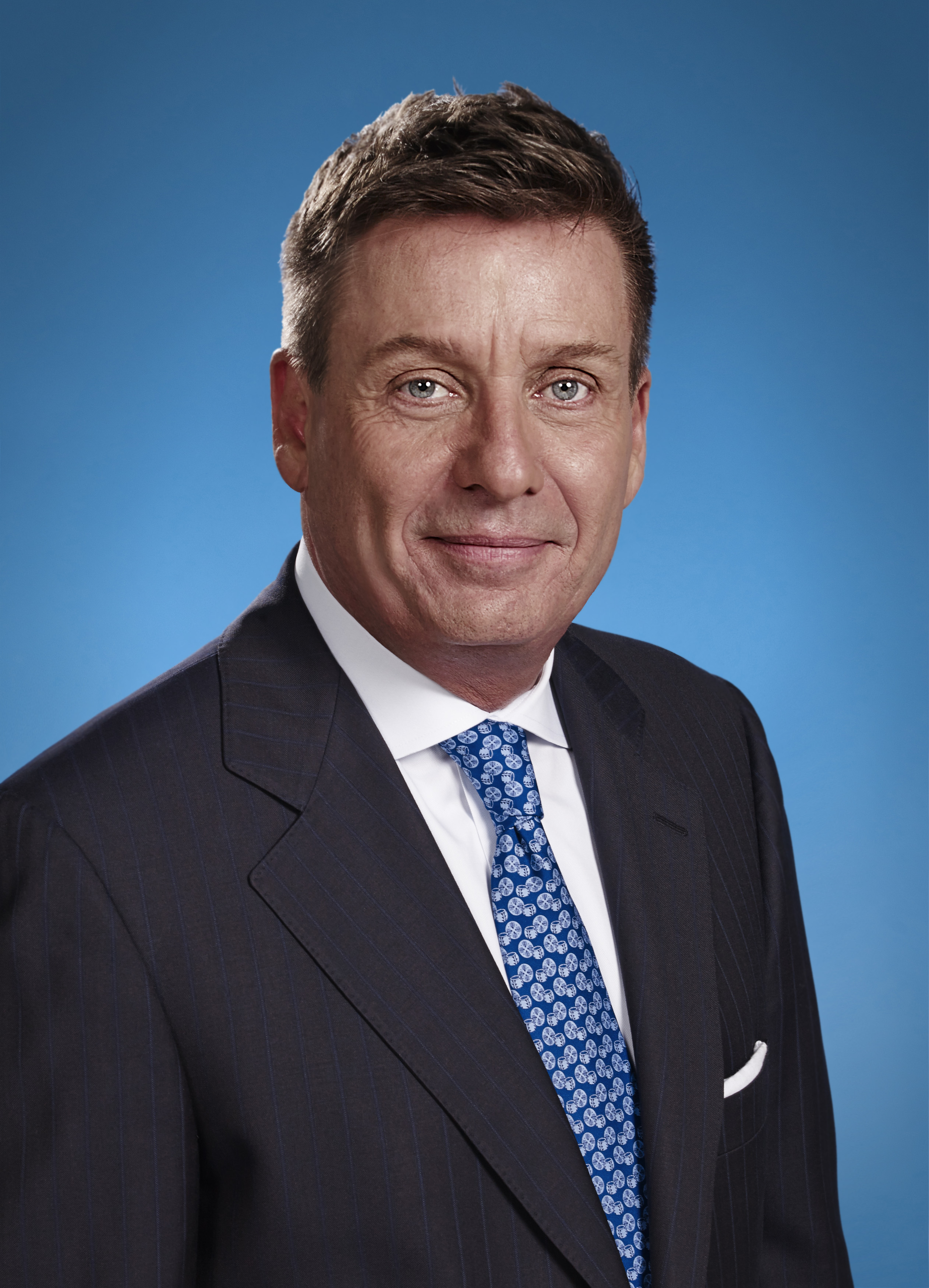
- Moreau in 2015

Representative of the Government in the Senate
- Incumbent
- Assumed office 18 July 2025
- Prime Minister: Mark Carney
- Preceded by: Marc Gold

Canadian Senator from Quebec - The Laurentides
- Incumbent
- Assumed office 10 September 2024
- Nominated by: Justin Trudeau
- Appointed by: Mary Simon
- Preceded by: Renée Dupuis
Provincial ministerial roles
Minister of Education, Recreation and Sports
In office 28 January 2016 – 22 February 2016
Preceded by	François Blais
Succeeded by	Sébastien Proulx; Hélène David
Minister of Municipal Affairs and Land Occupancy
In office 23 April 2014 – 28 January 2016
Preceded by	Sylvain Gaudreault
Succeeded by	Martin Coiteux
Minister responsible for the Monteregian region
In office 23 April 2014 – 22 February 2016
Preceded by	Marie Malavoy
Succeeded by	Lucie Charlebois

Member of the National Assembly of Quebec
- In office 8 December 2008 – 29 August 2018
- Preceded by: Jean-Marc Fournier
- Succeeded by: Marie-Chantal Chassé
- Constituency: Châteauguay
- In office 14 April 2003 – 26 March 2007
- Preceded by: François Beaulne
- Succeeded by: Simon-Pierre Diamond
- Constituency: Marguerite-D'Youville

Personal details
- Born: 12 December 1957 (age 68) Verchères, Quebec, Canada
- Party: Non-affiliated (2025—present)
- Other political affiliations: Progressive Senate Group (2024—2025); Quebec Liberal (until 2024)
- Profession: Lawyer

Pierre Moreau PC (born 12 December 1957) is a Canadian politician and former lawyer who has served as the representative of the Government in the Senate since 2025 under Prime Minister Mark Carney. He was appointed to the Senate in 2024 on the advice of Prime Minister Justin Trudeau, representing the Laurentides division of Quebec.

Moreau was a Liberal member of the National Assembly of Quebec from 2003 to 2007. He ran unsuccessfully for the leadership of the Quebec Liberal Party in 2013, coming second to Philippe Couillard. On 7 April 2014, Moreau was re-elected for a third consecutive term in Châteauguay in an election where the Liberals formed a majority government. On 23 April 2014, Philippe Couillard named him Minister of Municipal Affairs and Land Occupancy and Minister responsible for the Montérégie region. He lost his National Assembly seat in the 2018 Quebec general election.

== Biography ==
Born in Verchères on 12 December 1957, Pierre Moreau obtained a Bachelor of Civil Law from Laval University in 1980 and was admitted to the École du Barreau du Québec in 1981. He spent 22 years specializing in municipal and administrative law in a private practice in Montreal. He also shared his expertise by teaching at the École du Barreau du Québec from 1996 to 2002.

He first entered the political arena by running for the Liberal Party of Quebec in October 2002. Elected as MNA for Marguerite-d’Youville on 14 April 2003, he successively served as parliamentary assistant to the Minister of Justice and Attorney General, as assistant Government House Leader, and as parliamentary assistant to the Chair of the Conseil du trésor and Minister responsible for Government Administration.

In 2007 and 2008, Pierre Moreau held the offices of Chief of staff for the Government House Leader, and as Chief of staff for the Minister of Justice and Attorney General and the Minister of Public Security.

Elected as MNA for Châteauguay in the general election held on 8 December 2008, he held the offices of Chief Government Whip from December 2008 up until February 2011. From February to September 2011, of Minister responsible for Canadian Intergovernmental Affairs and the Canadian Francophonie, and of Minister responsible for the Reform of Democratic Institutions and Access to Information. He was then appointed as Minister of Transports from September 2011 to September 2012.

Pierre Moreau was, re-elected as MNA for Châteauguay in the general election held on 4 September 2012 and appointed as Official Opposition House Leader on 9 April 2013.

On 7 April 2014, Pierre Moreau was re-elected for the third consecutive time in Châteauguay. On 23 April 2014, Philippe Couillard, named him Minister of Municipal Affairs and Land Occupancy and Minister responsible for the Montérégie region.

On 28 January 2016 he was appointed Minister of Education, but went on a leave of absence on 22 February following a tumour diagnosis. Sébastien Proulx replaced Hélène David as Minister of Higher Education and Lucie Charlebois was responsible for Montérégie until his return to work on 19 January 2017.

Moreau was said by some pundits to be the heir apparent to the PLQ leadership until he lost his Chateauguay seat in the Quebec general election, 2018. Moreau earned second place in the 2013 party leadership race that elected Philippe Couillard.

In December 2018, Moreau decided to not run for the leadership of the Quebec Liberal Party.

In February 2019, Moreau was appointed Managing Partner of the Bélanger Sauvé law firm based in Montreal, Quebec for which he was an Associate Partner from 1991 to 2003.
