= Marguerite-D'Youville =

Former provincial electoral district in Quebec, Canada

Coordinates: 45.588°N 73.411°W

Quebec electoral district

Defunct provincial electoral district
- Legislature: National Assembly of Quebec
- District created: 1992
- District abolished: 2011
- First contested: 1994
- Last contested: 2008

Demographics
- Population (2001): 62,832
- Electors (2008): 51,956
- Area (km²): 132.55
- Census division(s): Longueuil (part), Marguerite D'Youville (part)
- Census subdivision(s): Boucherville, Sainte-Julie

Marguerite-D'Youville is a former provincial electoral district in the Montérégie region of Quebec, Canada, that elected members to the National Assembly of Quebec. As of its final election, it consisted of the cities of Boucherville and Sainte-Julie.

It was created for the 1994 election from Bertrand and named after Saint Marie-Marguerite d'Youville, founder of the Order of Sisters of Charity of the Hôpital Général of Montreal. Its final election was in 2008. It disappeared in the 2012 election and the successor electoral district was Montarville.

In the 1995 Quebec referendum it voted 59% for Quebec to separate.

== Members of the National Assembly ==
1. François Beaulne, Parti Québécois (1994–2003)
2. Pierre Moreau, Liberal (2003–2007)
3. Simon-Pierre Diamond, Action démocratique (2007–2008)
4. Monique Richard, Parti Québécois (2008–2012)

== Election results ==
2008 Quebec general election
Party	Candidate	Votes	%	±%
Parti Québécois	Monique Richard	14,533	39.75	+8.70
Liberal	Jean-Robert Grenier	13,119	35.88	+8.68
Action démocratique	Simon-Pierre Diamond	6,750	18.46	-18.61
Green	Thomas Goyette-Levac	1,097	3.00	-
Québec solidaire	Hugo Bergeron	1,064	2.91	-1.76

2007 Quebec general election
Party	Candidate	Votes	%	±%
Action démocratique	Simon-Pierre Diamond	15,536	37.07	+20.39
Parti Québécois	Sébastien Gagnon	13,015	31.05	-8.14
Liberal	Pierre Moreau	11,401	27.20	-14.18
Québec solidaire	Daniel Michelin	1,958	4.67	+3.31*

* Increase is from UFP

2003 Quebec general election
Party	Candidate	Votes	%	±%
Liberal	Pierre Moreau	16,368	41.38	+10.84
Parti Québécois	François Beaulne	15,501	39.19	-15.09
Action démocratique	Luc Pommainville	6,596	16.68	+2.95
Bloc Pot	Yan Lacombe	550	1.39	+0.55
UFP	Maxime Babeu	536	1.36	–
Total valid votes		39,551	98.74	
Rejected and declined votes		506	1.26	+0.31
Turnout		40,057	81.93	-4.74
Electors on the lists		48,892		
Source: Official Results, Government of Quebec
Liberal gain from Parti Québécois		Swing		+12.97

1998 Quebec general election
Party	Candidate	Votes	%	±%
Parti Québécois	François Beaulne	21,224	54.28	-3.74
Liberal	Guy Lafrance	11,941	30.54	-7.44
Action démocratique	Nicolas Gaboury	5,370	13.73	–
Bloc Pot	Hugô St-Onge	327	0.84	–
Socialist Democracy	Jonathan Bérubé	240	0.61	–
Total valid votes		39,102	99.05	
Rejected and declined votes		376	0.95	-2.63
Turnout		39,478	86.67	-0.49
Electors on the lists		45,548		
Source: Official Results, Government of Quebec
Parti Québécois hold		Swing		+5.59

1995 Quebec referendum
Side	Votes	%
Oui	23,778	59.01
Non	16,520	40.99

1994 Quebec general election
Party	Candidate	Votes	%
Parti Québécois	François Beaulne	19,995	58.02
Liberal	Claude Savaria	13,089	37.98
Green	Jean Dury	822	2.39
Natural Law	Jacinthe Vidal	554	1.61
Total valid votes		34,460	96.42
Rejected and declined votes		1,281	3.58
Turnout		35,741	87.16
Electors on the lists		41,008	
Source: Official Results, Government of Quebec

== See also ==
- List of Quebec provincial electoral districts
- Canadian provincial electoral districts
