= Monique Richard =

Canadian politician

MNA for Marguerite-D'Youville
- In office December 8, 2008 – 2012
- Preceded by: Simon-Pierre Diamond
- Succeeded by: riding dissolved

Personal details
- Party: Parti Québécois

Monique Richard (born December 12, 1947) is a Quebec politician. She is a member of the National Assembly of Quebec, representing the district of Marguerite-D'Youville. She was elected in the 2008 provincial election. She is a member of the Parti Québécois and served as president of that party from 2005 to 2008.

She is a former labour union leader of the Centrale des syndicats du Québec. She is now councilor and spokesperson of the left-wing SPQ Libre, a political faction within the Parti Québécois. She became the president of the Parti Québécois in 2005, becoming the first president after the separation of that function with that of leader of the party.

Richard obtained a bachelor's degree in education sciences from the École Normale Eulalie-Durocher in 1969 and became teacher at the primary level. From 1984 to 1999 she was the vice-president of the executive council of the Centrale des syndicats du Québec, and served as the president from 1999 to 2003.
