= Daneault =

Daneault is a surname. Notable people with the surname include:

- Hélène Daneault (born 1961), Canadian politician
- Richard Daneault (born 1976), Canadian curler
