= 2014 Quebec general election =

Canadian provincial election

- April 7, 2014

125 seats in the National Assembly of Quebec 63 seats needed for a majority
- Opinion polls
- Turnout: 71.43% (▼3.17%)
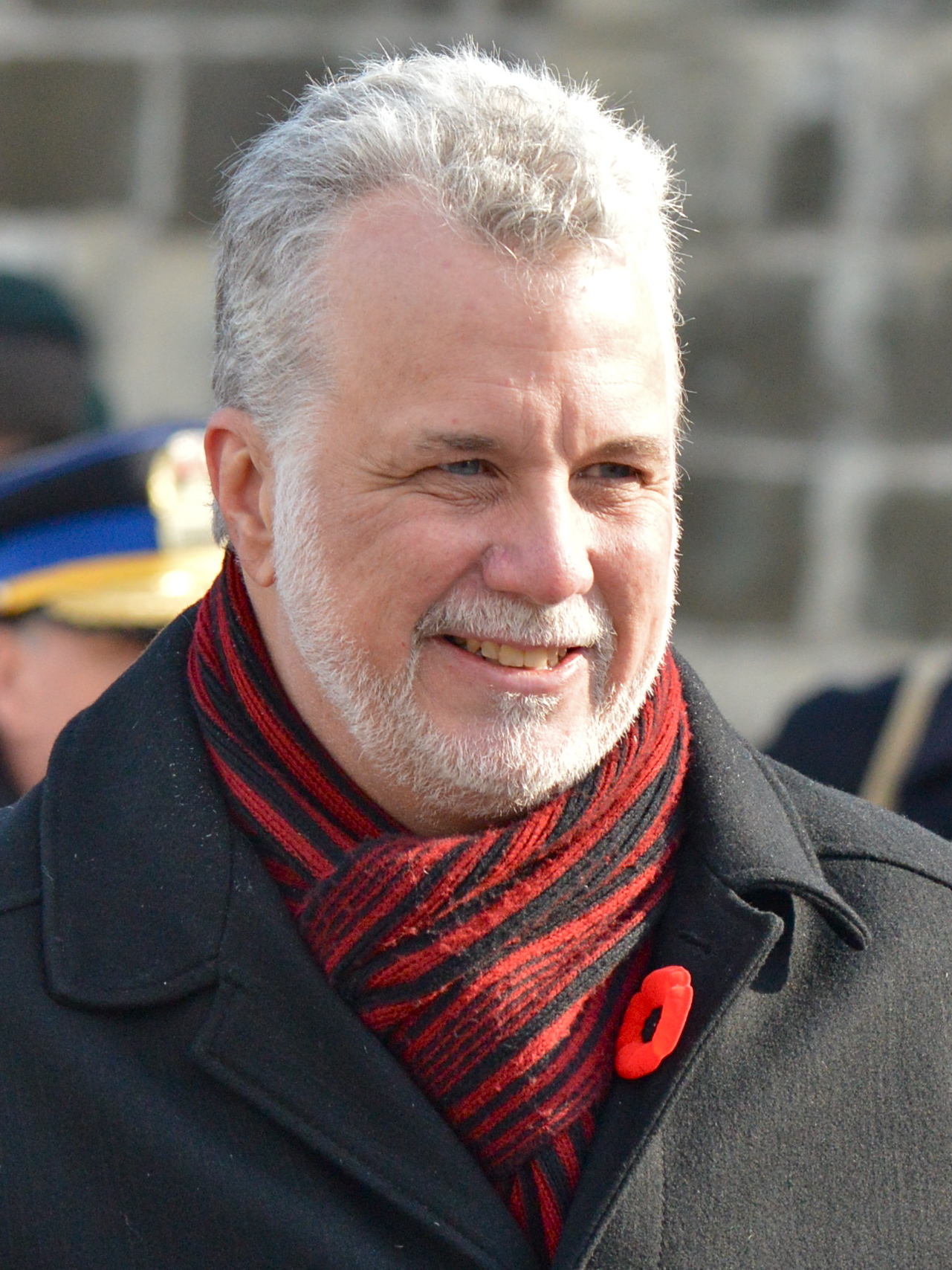

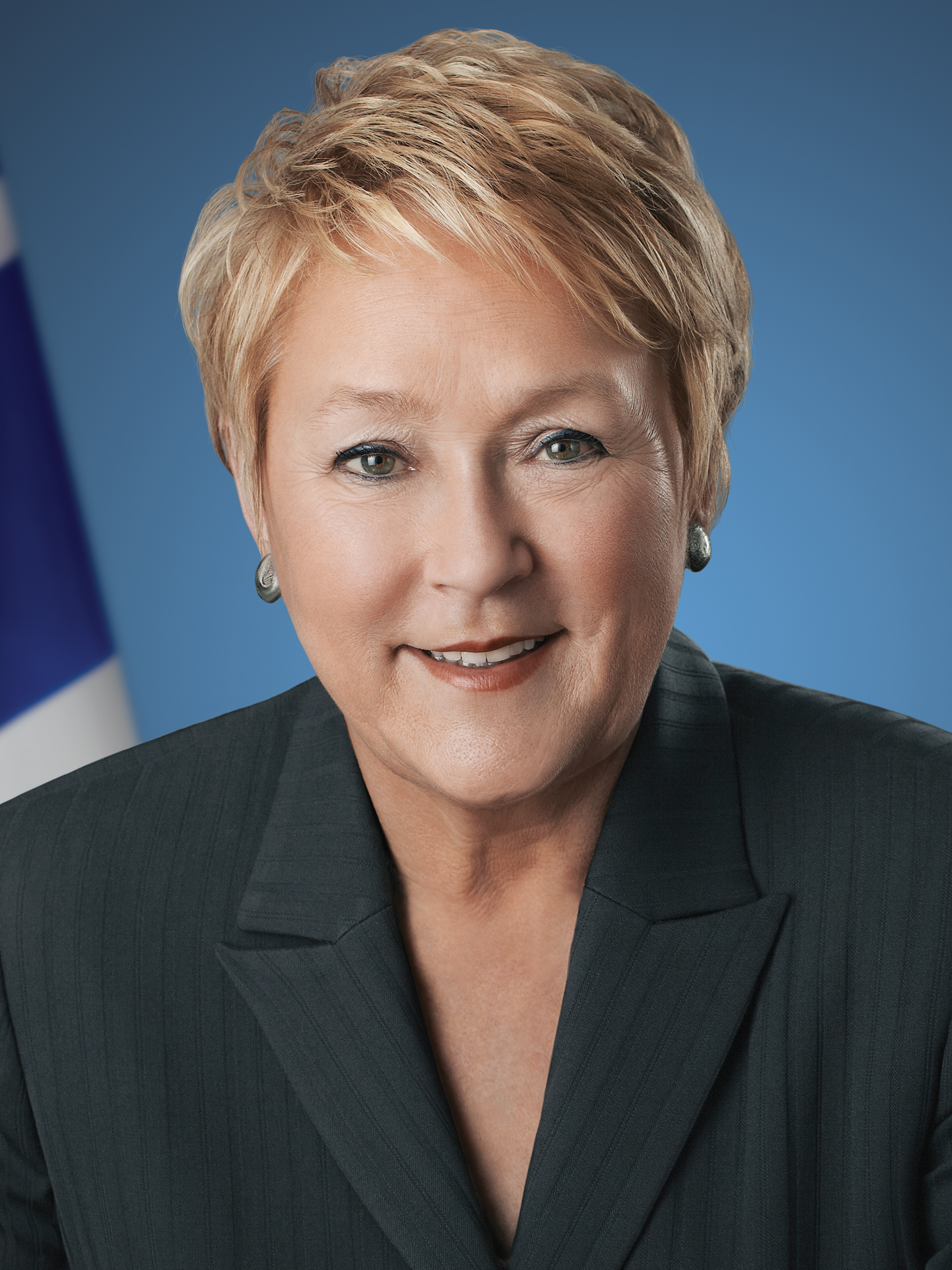

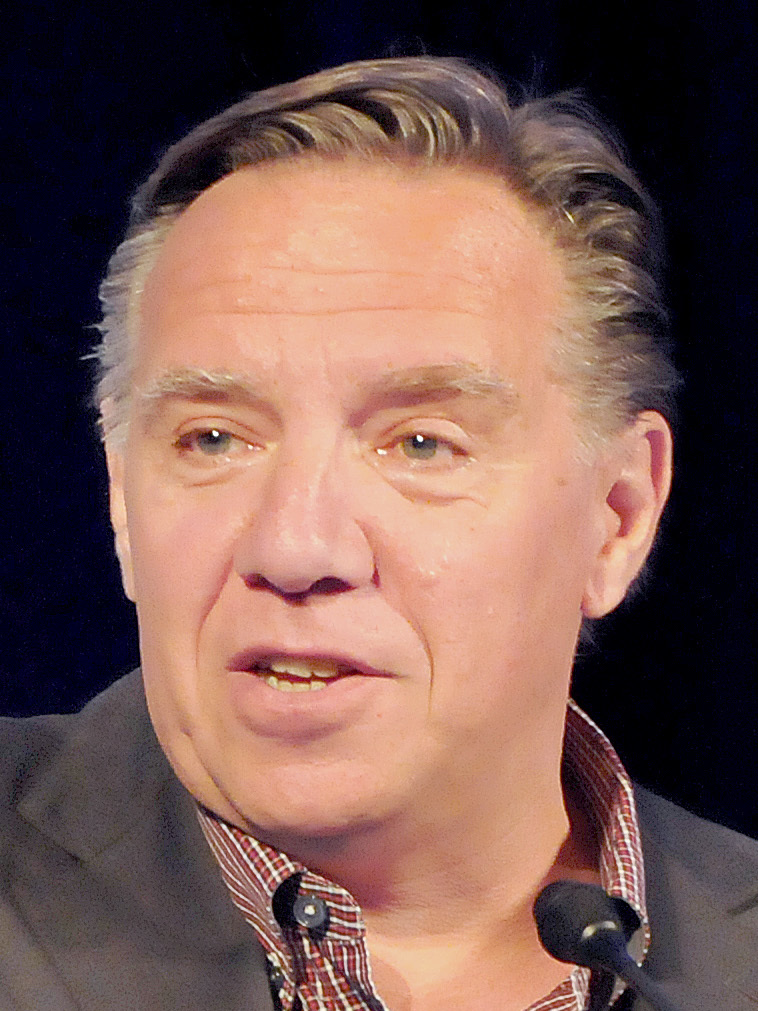

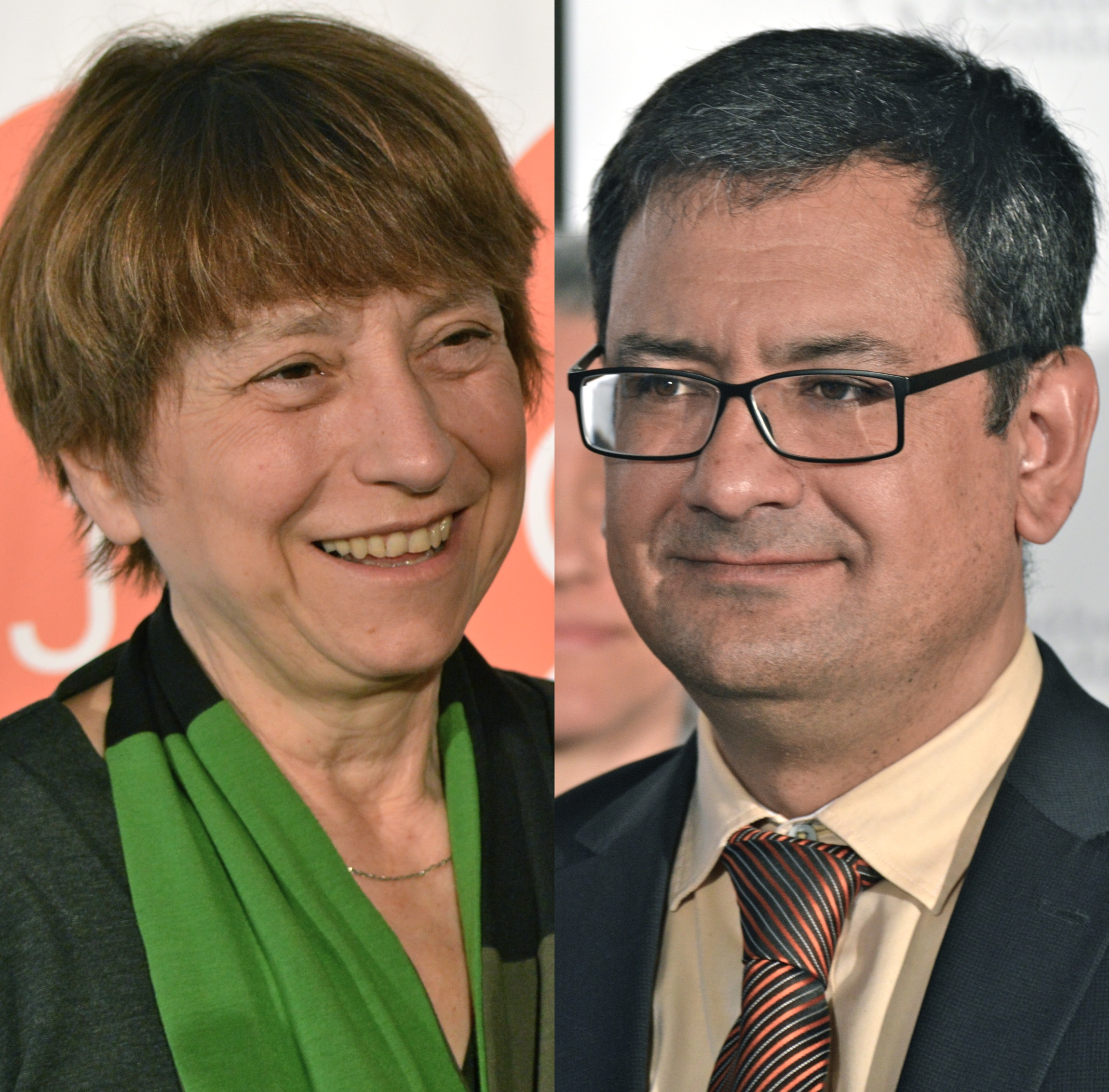
	Majority party	Minority party
Leader	Philippe Couillard	Pauline Marois
Party	Liberal	Parti Québécois
Leader since	March 17, 2013	June 26, 2007
Leader's seat	Roberval	Charlevoix–Côte-de-Beaupré (lost re-election)
Last election	50 seats, 31.20%	54 seats, 31.95%
Seats before	49	54
Seats won	70	30
Seat change	▲21	▼24
Popular vote	1,757,071	1,074,120
Percentage	41.52%	25.38%
Swing	▲10.32pp	▼6.57pp
	Third party	Fourth party
Leader	François Legault	Françoise David & Andrés Fontecilla
Party	Coalition Avenir Québec	Québec solidaire
Leader since	November 4, 2011	February 4, 2006 / May 5, 2013
Leader's seat	L'Assomption	Gouin / Ran in Laurier-Dorion (lost)
Last election	19 seats, 27.05%	2 seats, 6.03%
Seats before	18	2
Seats won	22	3
Seat change	▲4	▲1
Popular vote	975,607	323,124
Percentage	23.05%	7.63%
Swing	▼4.00pp	▲1.60pp
- Popular vote by riding. As this is an FPTP election, seat totals are not determined by popular vote, but instead via results by each riding. Click the map for more details.
Premier before election
Pauline Marois
Parti Québécois
Premier after election
Philippe Couillard
Liberal

The 2014 Quebec general election was held on April 7, 2014 to elect members to the National Assembly of Quebec. The incumbent Parti Québécois which had won a minority government in 2012 was defeated by the Quebec Liberal Party under Philippe Couillard who won a majority government of 70 seats, while the incumbent Parti Québécois finished second with 30 seats, becoming the first single-term government since Jean-Jacques Bertrand's Union Nationale government was defeated in 1970. Pauline Marois electoral defeat marked the shortest stay of any Quebec provincial government since the Canadian Confederation.

It marked the lowest seat total for the Parti Québécois since 1989 and its smallest share of the popular vote since its inaugural run in 1970, as Premier Pauline Marois lost her own riding. The Coalition Avenir Québec under François Legault made minor gains in terms of seats despite receiving a smaller share of the popular vote than in the previous election. Québec solidaire won an additional seat, though co-spokesperson Andrés Fontecilla failed to win his riding. This election saw the return of the Liberals to power 2 years after their defeat in 2012.

As of 2026, this is the last election where the Liberal Party won a majority of seats in the Quebec Assembly.

== Summary ==
Seating plan following the election.

At the outset of the campaign, the Parti Québécois had a modest lead in the polls and appeared to have a realistic prospect of winning a majority government. However, the party's support rapidly collapsed after the party announced Pierre Karl Péladeau, the president and CEO of media conglomerate Quebecor, as a star candidate. Péladeau's conservative and anti-union business background was widely criticized as being at odds with the party's social democratic history; and his outspoken support for a third referendum on Quebec sovereignty quickly sidelined the issues—including the Charter of Quebec Values and the corruption allegations against the Liberals, the latter of which had contributed to the defeat of Jean Charest's government in the 2012 election—which the party had identified as its primary campaign themes, alienating many voters who had little desire to revive the sovereignty issue.

In March 2014, Premier Pauline Marois was accused of antisemitism by The Center for Israel and Jewish Affairs (CIJA) surrounding the statements made by party member Louise Mailloux. Mailloux had written statements equating the Jewish practice of circumcision to rape and claimed that halal and kosher food prices were kept high to fund religious activities abroad. She wrote that the money went to: "For the Jews, to finance Israel's colonization in Palestinian territories? And for Muslims, to fund the Muslim Brotherhood, the Islamists who want to impose Islam worldwide?" Marois defended Mailloux, denying antisemitism within the party and stated that she had "very good relations with the leaders of this community and the leaders of all the different communities in Quebec." CIJA claimed Marois's apology and statements were inadequate and "meaningless excuses" with CIJA Quebec vice-president, Luciano Del Negro, stating: "She alleges a misunderstanding and refuses to basically recognize her views are not only offensive, but anti-Semitic in nature."

== Timeline (2012–2014) ==
=== Seat changes ===
Changes in seats held (2012–2014)
Seat	Before				Change		
Seat	Date	Member	Party	Reason	Date	Member	Party
Blainville	May 21, 2013	Daniel Ratthé	█ CAQ	Suspension			█ Independent
Viau	August 9, 2013	Emmanuel Dubourg	█ Liberal	Resignation	December 9, 2013	David Heurtel	█ Liberal
Outremont	August 26, 2013	Raymond Bachand	█ Liberal	Resignation	December 9, 2013	Philippe Couillard	█ Liberal
La Pinière	January 20, 2014	Fatima Houda-Pepin	█ Liberal	Resignation			█ Independent

=== Changes of party leaders ===
Changes in party leadership (2012–2014)
Party	Leaving			Succeeded by		
Party	Date	Name	Reason	Date	Name	Event
█ Liberal	September 5, 2012	Jean Charest	Resigned after losing election in Sherbrooke	September 12, 2012	Jean-Marc Fournier	Named as interim leader
█ Liberal	September 5, 2012	Jean Charest	Resigned after losing election in Sherbrooke	March 17, 2013	Philippe Couillard	Elected leader
█ QC solidaire	November 4, 2012	Amir Khadir	Stepped down as co-spokesperson due to party rules	December 2, 2012	André Frappier	Named as interim co-spokesperson
█ QC solidaire	November 4, 2012	Amir Khadir	Stepped down as co-spokesperson due to party rules	May 5, 2013	Andrés Fontecilla	Chosen as co-spokesperson
█ Green	February 24, 2013	Claude Sabourin	Resignation	February 24, 2013	Jean Cloutier	Named as interim leader
█ Green	February 24, 2013	Claude Sabourin	Resignation	September 21, 2013	Alex Tyrrell	Elected leader
█ Opt. nationale	June 19, 2013	Jean-Martin Aussant	Resignation	June 19, 2013	Nathaly Dufour	Became interim leader
█ Opt. nationale	June 19, 2013	Jean-Martin Aussant	Resignation	October 26, 2013	Sol Zanetti	Elected as leader

=== Other developments ===
Date	
September 4, 2012	The Parti Québécois wins a minority government in the 40th Quebec general election, and Pauline Marois becomes Quebec's first female premier.
September 19, 2012	Swearing in of the Cabinet members
October 30, 2012	The National Assembly of Quebec sits.
February 21, 2013	The Parti Québécois narrowly win a confidence motion on the budget by 52 members to 51 members.
June 13, 2013	An Act to amend the Election Act for the purpose of establishing fixed-date elections is given royal assent.
February 20, 2014	The Parti Québécois government table a budget before a two-week recess, sparking election speculation.
March 5, 2014	Lieutenant Governor Pierre Duchesne dissolves the National Assembly, on Premier Pauline Marois's request, and calls an election for April 7, 2014.
March 22, 2014	Deadline for nominations.
March 28, 2014	Returning office open for advanced vote 9:00 am to 9:00 pm ET (UTC−4).
March 29, 2014	Returning office open for advanced vote 9:00 am to 5:00 pm ET.
March 30–31, 2014	Advance polls open 9:30 am to 8:00 pm ET.
April 1, 2014	Elections Quebec was criticized as anglophone students have been rejected the right to vote although they have in some cases been Quebec residents for more than four years.
April 1–2, 2014	Returning office open for advanced vote 9:00 am to 9:00 pm ET.
April 3, 2014	Returning office open for advanced vote 9:00 am to 2:00 pm ET.
April 7, 2014	Election Day. Polls open 9:30 am to 8:00 pm ET.

== Incumbent MNAs who did not run for re-election ==
Electoral District	Incumbent at dissolution and subsequent nominee		New MNA
Taillon	Marie Malavoy	Diane Lamarre	Diane Lamarre
Rimouski	Irvin Pelletier	Harold LeBel	Harold LeBel
D'Arcy-McGee	Lawrence Bergman	David Birnbaum	David Birnbaum
Maskinongé	Jean-Paul Diamond	Marc Plante	Marc Plante
Verdun	Henri-François Gautrin	Jacques Daoust	Jacques Daoust
Nelligan	Yolande James	Martin Coiteux	Martin Coiteux
Pontiac	Charlotte L'Écuyer	André Fortin	André Fortin
Vaudreuil	Yvon Marcoux	Marie-Claude Nichols	Marie-Claude Nichols
Robert-Baldwin	Pierre Marsan	Carlos Leitão	Carlos Leitão
Trois-Rivières	Danielle St-Amand	Jean-Denis Girard	Jean-Denis Girard
Groulx	Hélène Daneault	Claude Surprenant	Claude Surprenant
Saint-Jérôme	Jacques Duchesneau	Patrice Charbonneau	Pierre Karl Péladeau
Blainville	Daniel Ratthé	–	Mario Laframboise

== Opinion polls ==
Evolution of voting intentions for the 2014 Quebec general election. Dots are individual poll results and trend lines are local regressions with 95% confidence interval.

Polling firm	Last date of polling	Link	PQ	QLP	CAQ	QS	ON	GPQ	Other
Election results	April 7, 2014	HTML	25.38	41.52	23.05	7.63	0.73	0.55	1.14
Angus Reid^{[1]}	April 4, 2014	PDF	27	39	25	7	1	1	1
Segma Recherche	April 4, 2014	PDF	25.7	41.5	22.0	8.9			1.9
Forum Research	April 3, 2014	PDF	24	44	23	6	0	2	1
Léger Marketing	April 3, 2014	PDF	29	38	23	9		1	1
EKOS^{[1]}	April 3, 2014	PDF	27.0	39.8	21.1	9.4			2.8
Ipsos Reid^{[1]}	April 1, 2014	HTML	28	40	18	12	0		2
Forum Research	March 31, 2014	PDF	29	41	19	7	1	2	1
Léger Marketing	March 23, 2014	PDF	33	40	15	9	1	1	1
Forum Research	March 19, 2014	PDF	32	45	13	7	0	2	1
Ipsos Reid^{[1]}	March 18, 2014	HTML	33	40	14	9	2		2
CROP	March 16, 2014	PDF	36	39	13	10	1		1
Léger Marketing	March 13, 2014	PDF	37	37	14	9	1	1	1
CROP	March 8, 2014	HTML	36	36	17	8	1		2
Forum Research	March 5, 2014	PDF	38	40	12	7	0	2	1
Léger Marketing	March 3, 2014	PDF	37	35	15	8	1	2	1
2012 Election	September 4, 2012	HTML	31.95	31.20	27.05	6.03	1.89	0.99	0.89

^{1} Results among "likely voters"

=== By Language ===
==== French ====
Voting intentions among French speakers

Timeline of opinion polls
Polling organisation	Last date of polling	Source	Sample size	MoE	PQ	PLQ	CAQ	QS	Other	Lead
Angus Reid	April 4, 2014	PDF			31	30	28	10	3 (Note: 1 for Green Party of Quebec, 1 for Option nationale)	1
Segma	April 4, 2014	PDF			31	33	24	10		2
Forum	April 3, 2014	PDF			27	35	28	6	4 (Note: 2 for Green Party of Quebec, 1 for Option nationale)	7
leger	April 3, 2014	PDF			35	29	27	9	1	6
leger	23 March 2014	PDF			40	30	17	10	3 (Note: 1 for Green Party of Quebec, 1 for Option nationale)	10
CROP	March 16, 2014	PDF			43	30	14	11	2 (Note: 1 for Option nationale)	13
leger	March 13, 2014	PDF			44	27	15	10	4 (Note: 1 for Green Party of Quebec, 1 for Option nationale)	17
CROP	March 8, 2014	PDF			42	25	20			17
leger	March 3, 2014	PDF			45	23	18	8	5 (Note: 2 for Green Party of Quebec, 2 for Option nationale)	22
CROP	February 16, 2014	PDF			50	24	17			36
CROP	January 19, 2014	PDF			42	24	19			18
Leger	18 January 2014	PDF			43	25	19	8	5 (Note: 2 for Green Party of Quebec)	18
CROP	December 9, 2013	PDF			40	27	20	10	3 (Note: 2 for Option nationale)	13
Leger	December 5, 2013	PDF			39	28	21	9	3 (Note: 2 for Option nationale)	11
Forum	22 October 2013	PDF			38	35	14	8	5 (Note: 2 for Green Party of Quebec, 2 for Option nationale)	3
CROP	October 21, 2013	PDF			41	29	16	9		12
CROP	June 17, 2013	PDF			30	27	26	12	5	3
CROP	20 May 2013	PDF			29	27	26	12	5	2
Léger	March 28, 2013	PDF			36	24	23	10	8 (Note: 3 for Green Party of Quebec, 4 for Option nationale)	12
Léger	December 13, 2012	PDF			40	17	27	10	5 (Note: 1 for Green Party of Quebec, 3 for Option nationale)	13
Léger	November 22, 2012	PDF			40	20	24	8	7 (Note: 1 for Green Party of Quebec, 5 for Option nationale)	16
Léger	16 October 2012	PDF			38	23	28	7	4 (Note: 1 for Green Party of Quebec, 2 for Option nationale)	10

==== Non French ====
Timeline of opinion polls
Polling organisation	Last date of polling	Source	Sample size	MoE	PQ	PLQ	CAQ	QS	Other	Lead
Angus Reid	April 4, 2014	PDF			1	90	3	2	3 (Note: 2 for Green Party of Quebec, 0 for Option nationale)	
Segma	April 4, 2014	PDF			5	74	14	6	1	
Forum	April 3, 2014	PDF			6	86	2	2	3 (Note: 3 for Green Party of Quebec, 0 for Option nationale)	
Leger	April 3, 2014	PDF			7	71	11	8	3 (Note: 2 for Green Party of Quebec)	
CROP	March 16, 2014	PDF			9	71	10	8	2 (Note: 1 for Option nationale)	
Leger	March 13, 2014	PDF			9	74	10	4	2 (Note: 2 for Green Party of Quebec, 0 for Option nationale)	
Leger	December 5, 2013	PDF			5	71	12	3	9 (Note: 8 for Green Party of Quebec, 0 for Option nationale)	
CROP	June 17, 2013	PDF			1	86	5	5	4 (Note: 3 for Option nationale)	
CROP	20 May 2013	PDF			0	86	8	0	7 (Note: 3 for Option nationale)	
Leger	November 22, 2012	PDF			6	68	12	6	8 (Note: 6 for Green Party of Quebec, 0 for Option nationale)	
Leger	16 October 2012	PDF			11	59	14	10	6 (Note: 5 for Green Party of Quebec, 1 for Option nationale)	

=== Pre-campaign period ===
Pre-campaign period polling (Sep 2012 – Feb 2014)
Polling firm	Last date of polling	Link	PQ	QLP	CAQ	QS	ON	GPQ	Other
CROP	February 16, 2014	HTML	40	34	16	7	2		2
CROP	January 19, 2014	HTML	35	35	16	10	3		2
Léger Marketing	January 18, 2014	PDF	36	33	17	8		3	3
CROP	December 9, 2013	PDF	35	35	18	10	2		1
Léger Marketing	December 5, 2013	PDF	32	37	19	8	1	2	1
CROP	November 17, 2013	PDF	32	37	17	10	2		2
Forum Research	October 22, 2013	PDF	36	38	13	8	2	2	1
CROP	October 21, 2013	HTML	34	38	15	8	4		
Léger Marketing	October 10, 2013	PDF	34	36	17	8		4	1
CROP	September 15, 2013	HTML	30	35	21	11	2		2
Léger Marketing	September 14, 2013	PDF	33	36	18	9		2	2
Forum Research	September 13, 2013	PDF	35	42	12	7	1	2	1
Léger Marketing	August 30, 2013	PDF	32	36	18	6	2	3	3
CROP	August 18, 2013	HTML	29	40	20	7	2		2
Léger Marketing	June 19, 2013	PDF	27	38	19	8	3	3	2
CROP	June 17, 2013	PDF	25	38	22	11	4		1
CROP	May 20, 2013	PDF	24	38	22	10	5		1
Léger Marketing	May 6, 2013	PDF	27	35	19	11	4	2	2
CROP	April 22, 2013	HTML	25	38	22	11	3		1
Léger Marketing	March 28, 2013	PDF	29	33	20	9	3	4	2
CROP	March 18, 2013	PDF	29	31	25	10			5
Léger Marketing	March 10, 2013	PDF	31	30	20	9	4	5	1
CROP	February 18, 2013	HTML	30	30	27	9			3
Léger Marketing	February 6, 2013	PDF	33	31	20	8	3	3	2
CROP	January 21, 2013	PDF	34	29	24	9			4
CROP	January 9, 2013	HTML	31	30	27	8			4
Léger Marketing	December 13, 2012	PDF	33	27	27	9	2	2	1
CROP	December 10, 2012	PDF	36	25	25	10			4
CROP	November 23, 2012	HTML	31	29	25	9			5
Léger Marketing	November 22, 2012	PDF	33	31	22	8	4	2	1
CROP	November 19, 2012	HTML	35	27	29	6			3
CROP	October 22, 2012	HTML	34	29	24	11	1	1	
Léger Marketing	October 16, 2012	PDF	32	30	25	8	2	2	1
2012 Election	September 4, 2012	HTML	31.95	31.20	27.05	6.03	1.89	0.99	0.89

== Media endorsements ==
Parti Québécois

- Le Devoir

Quebec Liberal Party

- La Presse
- Montreal Gazette

== List of candidates ==
=== Bas-Saint-Laurent and Gaspésie–Îles-de-la-Madeleine ===
Electoral district	Candidates						Incumbent
Electoral district	PQ	Liberal	CAQ	QS	ON	Other	Incumbent
Bonaventure	Sylvain Roy 11380 45.70%	Damien Arsenault 10580 42.20%	Jean-Marc Landry 1061 4.26%	Patricia Chartier 1540 6.18%	Louis-Patrick St-Pierre 130 0.52%	Patrick Dubois (Nul) 283 1.14%	Sylvain Roy
Côte-du-Sud	André Simard 6649 19.12%	Norbert Morin 17348 49.88%	Mireille Caron 8093 23.27%	Simon Côté 1910 5.49%	Joël Leblanc-Lavoie 158 0.45%	Renaud Blais (Nul) 347 1.00% Gaétan Mercier (Cons.) 272 0.78%	Norbert Morin
Gaspé	Gaétan Lelièvre 10026 52.03%	Annie St-Onge 6513 33.80%	Yvan Blanchard 1192 6.19%	Daniel Leboeuf 989 5.13%	Frédérick Deroy 194 1.01%	Catherine Beau-Ferron (Nul) 255 1.32% Christian Rioux (Cons.) 99 0.51%	Gaétan Lelièvre
Îles-de-la-Madeleine	Jeannine Richard 3319 40.17%	Germain Chevarie 4137 50.07%	Mario-Michel Jomphe 262 3.17%	Natalia Porowska 499 6.04%	David Boudreau 46 0.56%		Jeannine Richard
Matane-Matapédia	Pascal Bérubé 18025 61.16%	Dave Gravel 6712 22.77%	Yann Gobeil-Nadon 3019 10.24%	Gérald Tremblay 1511 5.13%	Joëlle Vadeboncoeur Harrison 207 0.70%		Pascal Bérubé
Rimouski	Harold LeBel 12028 40.58%	Pierre Huot 8888 29.99%	Steven Fleurent 3186 10.75%	Marie-Neige Besner 4851 16.37%	Pierre Beaudoin 327 1.10%	Tom-Henri Cyr (Pot) 138 0.47% Pier-Luc Gagnon (Nul) 219 0.74%	Irvin Pelletier
Rivière-du-Loup–Témiscouata	Michel Lagacé 8378 23.95%	Jean D'Amour 18086 51.69%	Charles Roy 5794 16.56%	Louis Gagnon 2129 6.09%	Étienne Massé 245 0.70%	Frank Malenfant (PDSP) 354 1.01%	Jean D'Amour

=== Saguenay–Lac-Saint-Jean and Côte-Nord ===
Electoral district	Candidates						Incumbent
Electoral district	PQ	Liberal	CAQ	QS	ON	Other	Incumbent
Chicoutimi	Stéphane Bédard 11245 34.48%	Michel Mallette 9640 29.56%	Jean-François Doyon 5691 17.45%	Réjean Godin 2105 6.46%	Philippe Gosselin 327 1.00%	Marc Pettersen (Ind.) 3601 11.04%	Stéphane Bédard
Dubuc	Jean-Marie Claveau 8919 32.13%	Serge Simard 11386 41.02%	Claudie Emond 5240 18.88%	Marie-Lise Chrétien-Pineault 1494 5.38%	Ariane Belva 285 1.03%	Pascal Tremblay (Ind.) 431 1.55%	Jean-Marie Claveau
Duplessis	Lorraine Richard 8910 39.99%	Laurence Méthot 8513 38.21%	Christine Pinard 2898 13.01%	Jacques Gélineau 1502 6.74%	Yan Rivard 458 2.06%		Lorraine Richard
Jonquière	Sylvain Gaudreault 13487 43.52%	Tommy Pageau 8254 26.63%	Mélanie Boucher 7318 23.61%	Réjean Dumais 1608 5.19%	Nicolas Beaulieu 326 1.05%		Sylvain Gaudreault
Lac-Saint-Jean	Alexandre Cloutier 13159 44.53%	Pascal Gagnon 8331 28.19%	Elise Marchildon 5412 18.32%	Frédérick Plamondon 1872 6.34%	Sabrina Fauteux-Aïmola 222 0.75%	Francis Dubé (Nul) 318 1.08% Yann Lavoie (Cons.) 235 0.80%	Alexandre Cloutier
René-Lévesque	Marjolain Dufour 11029 55.00%	Michel Lévesque 4366 21.77%	Marie-Christine Fortin-Morand 3152 15.72%	Marie-Pierre Clavette 1297 6.47%	Nicolas Boivin Ringuette 207 1.03%		Marjolain Dufour
Roberval	Denis Trottier 10764 33.33%	Philippe Couillard 17816 55.17%	François Truchon 2239 6.93%	Guillaume Néron 1018 3.15%	Luc-Antoine Cauchon 218 0.68%	Julie Boucher (PDSP) 237 0.73%	Denis Trottier

=== Capitale-Nationale ===
Results and statistics

Electoral district	Candidates							Incumbent
Electoral district	PQ	Liberal	CAQ	QS	ON	Conservative	Other	Incumbent
Charlesbourg	Dominique Payette 7215 17.92%	François Blais 16934 42.07%	Denise Trudel 13053 32.43%	Marie Céline Domingue 1936 4.81%	Guillaume Cyr 257 0.64%	Milan Jovanovic 450 1.12%	Sylvain Fiset (Nul) 315 0.78% Normand Fournier (M-L) 40 0.10% Daniel Lachance (UN) 52 0.13%	Denise Trudel
Charlevoix–Côte-de-Beaupré	Pauline Marois 12201 32.87%	Caroline Simard 13083 35.24%	Ian Latrémouille 9682 26.08%	Jean-Yves Bernard 1539 4.15%	François Thériault 287 0.77%	Chantal Melançon 332 0.89%		Pauline Marois
Chauveau	Christian Robitaille 5289 12.22%	Bernard Chartier 12940 29.91%	Gérard Deltell 22679 52.41%	Jean-Claude Bernheim 1617 3.74%	Sophie Leblanc 289 0.67%	Julie Plamondon 455 1.05%		Gérard Deltell
Jean-Lesage	Pierre Châteauvert 6998 22.40%	André Drolet 11645 37.27%	Émilie Foster 7431 23.78%	Sébastien Bouchard 3626 11.60%	Sol Zanetti 782 2.50%	Andrés Garcia 246 0.79%	José Breton (Ind.) 93 0.30% Sébastien Dumais (Nul) 384 1.23% Claude Moreau (M-L) 43 0.14%	André Drolet
Jean-Talon	Clément Laberge 7824 22.48%	Yves Bolduc 15492 44.50%	Hugues Beaulieu 7158 20.56%	Eveline Gueppe 3151 9.05%	Alexandre Lavallée 526 1.51%	Monique Roy Verville 206 0.59%	Maxime Couillard (Nul) 389 1.12% Stéphane Pouleur (Auto.) 66 0.19%	Yves Bolduc
La Peltrie	Paule Desgagnés 4281 10.07%	France Gagnon 14362 33.80%	Éric Caire 21386 50.33%	Alexandre Jobin-Lawler 1444 3.40%	Éric Belleau 274 0.64%	Thomas Pouliot 561 1.32%	Camille Dion-Garneau (Auto.) 185 0.44%	Éric Caire
Louis-Hébert	Patrice Dallaire 6841 18.37%	Sam Hamad 18327 49.22%	Mario Asselin 9650 25.92%	Pascal Minville 1840 4.94%	Patrick Côté 266 0.71%	Dany Bergeron 310 0.83%		Sam Hamad
Montmorency	Michel Guimond 7242 17.11%	Raymond Bernier 17113 40.42%	Michelyne St-Laurent 14323 33.83%	Jean-Pierre Duchesneau 1981 4.68%	Jean Bouchard 255 0.60%	Adrien Pouliot 1015 2.40%	Marielle Parent (Green) 407 0.96%	Michelyne St-Laurent
Portneuf	Hugues Genois 4525 14.67%	Michel Matte 12779 41.42%	Jacques Marcotte 11720 37.99%	Catherine Côté 1209 3.92%	Stéphanie Grimard 227 0.74%	Daniel Beaulieu 391 1.27%		Jacques Marcotte
Taschereau	Agnès Maltais 11376 31.66%	Florent Tanlet 10925 30.40%	Steve Brabant 5865 16.32%	Marie-Ève Duchesne 5495 15.29%	Catherine Dorion 1613 4.21%	Anne Deblois 198 0.55%	Guy Boivin (Auto.) 49 0.14% Sylvain Drolet (PDSP) 127 0.35% Jean-Luc Savard (Nul) 385 1.07%	Agnès Maltais
Vanier-Les Rivières	Marc Dean 6337 15.03%	Patrick Huot 18398 43.64%	Sylvain Lévesque 14535 34.48%	Monique Voisine 1920 4.55%	Mathieu Fillion 400 0.95%	Jean-Alex Martin 564 1.34%		Sylvain Lévesque

=== Mauricie ===
Electoral district	Candidates						Incumbent
Electoral district	PQ	Liberal	CAQ	QS	ON	Other	Incumbent
Champlain	Noëlla Champagne 10481 30.17%	Pierre-Michel Auger 11615 33.44%	Andrew D'Amours 10569 30.43%	Lucie Favreau 1848 5.32%	Nicolas Lavigne-Lefebvre 222 0.64%		Noëlla Champagne
Laviolette	André Beaudoin 5492 23.25%	Julie Boulet 12422 52.58%	Sylvain Gauthier 4432 18.76%	Jean-François Dubois 1104 4.67%	Gabriel Olivier Clavet-Massicotte 124 0.52%	Jean-Paul Bédard (M-L) 52 0.22%	Julie Boulet
Maskinongé	Patrick Lahaie 8739 25.11%	Marc Plante 13658 39.24%	Martin Poisson 9846 28.29%	Linda Delmé 2013 5.78%	Dany Brien 154 0.44%	Laurence J. Requilé (Équit.) 119 0.34% François-Xavier Richmond (MPLQ) 35 0.10% Jimmy Thibodeau (Nul) 238 0.68%	Jean-Paul Diamond
Saint-Maurice	Luc Trudel 7591 30.93%	Pierre Giguère 8244 33.59%	Stéphane Mongeau 6982 28.45%	Marie-Line Audet 1304 5.31%	Jean Guillemette 152 0.62%	Jonathan Lapointe (Cons.) 268 1.09%	Luc Trudel
Trois-Rivières	Alexis Deschênes 8452 28.39%	Jean-Denis Girard 11658 39.16%	Diego Brunelle 6634 22.28%	Jean-Claude Landry 2531 8.50%	André de Repentigny 238 0.80%	Pierre-Louis Bonneau (Cons.) 260 0.87%	Danielle St-Amand

=== Estrie ===
Electoral district	Candidates							Incumbent
Electoral district	PQ	Liberal	CAQ	QS	ON	Conservative	Other	Incumbent
Mégantic	Isabelle Hallé 7879 29.65%	Ghislain Bolduc 10840 40.79%	Pierre-Luc Boulanger 6078 22.87%	Ludovick Nadeau 1541 5.80%	Évelyne Beaudin 236 0.89%			Ghislain Bolduc
Orford	Michel Breton 7767 26.23%	Pierre Reid 13055 44.09%	Marc-Alexandre Bourget 6227 21.03%	Patricia Tremblay 2291 7.74%	Denis Spick 273 0.92%			Pierre Reid
Richmond	Étienne-Alexis Boucher 11521 27.60%	Karine Vallières 17178 41.16%	Alain Dion 9197 22.04%	Colombe Landry 2833 6.79%	Vincent Proulx 236 0.57%	Dave Côté 209 0.50%	Aurélie Dion-Fontaine (Green) 563 1.35%	Karine Vallières
Saint-François	Réjean Hébert 12725 32.91%	Guy Hardy 14899 38.53%	Gaston Stratford 6607 17.09%	André Poulin 3136 8.11%	Étienne Boudou-Laforce 265 0.69%	Marcel Collette 181 0.47%	Vincent J. Carbonneau (Green) 478 1.24% Philippe Lafrance (Pot) 292 0.76% Lionel Lambert (UN) 82 0.21%	Réjean Hébert
Sherbrooke	Serge Cardin 10525 30.98%	Luc Fortin 12380 36.44%	Philippe Girard 5672 16.69%	Hélène Pigot 4393 12.93%	Jean-Simon Campbell 321 0.94%	François Drogue 181 0.53%	Jeremy Andrews (Green) 328 0.97% Hubert Richard (n.d.) 48 0.14% Jossy Roy (Pot) 130 0.38%	Serge Cardin

=== Montréal ===
==== East ====
Electoral district	Candidates							Incumbent
Electoral district	PQ	Liberal	CAQ	QS	ON	Green	Other	Incumbent
Anjou–Louis-Riel	Yasmina Chouakri 7326 23.19%	Lise Thériault 16049 50.81%	Richard Campeau 5315 16.83%	Marlène Lessard 2448 7.75%	Raphael Couture 147 0.47%	Annibal Teclou 303 0.96%		Lise Thériault
Bourassa-Sauvé	Leila Mahiout 5646 19.07%	Rita de Santis 17905 60.48%	Fabrizio Del Fabbro 3624 12.24%	Claude Généreux 1747 5.90%	Félix Luthu 119 0.40%	Adam Aberra 351 1.19%	Jean-François Brunet (Pot) 214 0.72	Rita de Santis
Bourget	Maka Kotto 12525 37.78%	Jean-Pierre Gagnon 9567 28.86%	Sylvain Medza 6510 19.64%	Gaétan Châteauneuf 3714 11.20%	Diego Saavedra Renaud 243 0.73%	Thomas Lapierre 489 1.48%	Claude Brunelle (M-L) 101 0.30%	Maka Kotto
Crémazie	Diane De Courcy 10892 31.60%	Marie Montpetit 13440 39.00%	Sylvain Bessette 4731 13.73%	André Frappier 4726 13.71%	Gabrielle Ladouceur-Despins 227 0.66%	Virginia Leurent-Bonnevie 448 1.30%		Diane De Courcy
Gouin	Louise Mailloux 6438 20.31%	Cheraquie Auguste-Constant 5642 17.80%	Paul Franche 2748 8.67%	Françoise David 16155 50.98%	Olivier Lacelle 358 1.13%		Marc Boulanger (Nul) 351 1.11%	Françoise David
Hochelaga-Maisonneuve	Carole Poirier 9038 34.86%	David Provencher 4675 18.03%	Brendan Walsh 3097 11.95%	Alexandre Leduc 7926 30.57%	Simon Marchand 316 1.22%	Malcolm Lewis-Richmond 352 1.36%	Justin Canning (Nul) 278 1.07% Christine Dandenault (M-L) 61 0.24% Etienne Mallette (Pot) 182 0.70%	Carole Poirier
Jeanne-Mance–Viger	Joanie Harnois 2956 8.60%	Filomena Rotiroti 27007 78.53%	Mario Parent 2820 8.20%	Stéphanie Charpentier 1154 3.36%		Melissa Miscione 379 1.10%	Garnet Colly (M-L) 73 0.21%	Filomena Rotiroti
LaFontaine	Mathieu Pelletier 3327 10.84%	Marc Tanguay 22476 73.26%	Julie Di Battista Manseau 3303 10.77%	Véronique Martineau 1189 3.88%	Geneviève Dao Phan 116 0.38%	Benoit Drouin 233 0.76%	Yves Le Seigle (M-L) 34 0.11%	Marc Tanguay
Laurier-Dorion	Pierre Céré 5369 15.93%	Gerry Sklavounos 15566 46.19%	Valérie Assouline 2431 7.21%	Andrés Fontecilla 9330 27.69%	Miguel Tremblay 263 0.78%	Jeremy Tessier 482 1.43%	Peter Macrisopoulos (M-L) 116 0.34% Hugô St-Onge (Pot) 143 0.42%	Gerry Sklavounos
Mercier	Sylvie Legault 5872 20.50%	Richard Sagala 6593 23.02%	Alain Clavet 2400 8.38%	Amir Khadir 13228 46.19%	Martin Servant 228 0.80%		Hate's Deslandes (Pot) 189 0.66% Roger Hughes (Ind.) 129 0.45%	Amir Khadir
Pointe-aux-Trembles	Nicole Léger 12021 43.22%	Claude Blais 6229 22.40%	Mathieu Binette 6692 24.06%	Natacha Larocque 2165 7.78%	Camille Goyette-Gingras 234 0.84%	David Cox 332 1.19%	Louis Chandonnet (Auto.) 56 0.20% Geneviève Royer (M-L) 82 0.29%	Nicole Léger
Rosemont	Jean-François Lisée 12712 34.27%	Thiery Valade 11114 29.96%	Carl Dubois 5252 14.16%	Jean Trudelle 6930 18.68%	Sophie-Geneviève Labelle 321 0.87%	Ksenia Svetoushkina 488 1.32%	Matthew Babin (Pot) 200 0.54% Stéphane Chénier (M-L) 78 0.21%	Jean-François Lisée
Sainte-Marie–Saint-Jacques	Daniel Breton 7612 27.61%	Anna Klisko 8346 30.27%	Patrick Thauvette 2364 8.57%	Manon Massé 8437 30.60%	Nic Payne 210 0.76%	Stewart Wiseman 393 1.43%	Marc Bissonnette (Pot) 164 0.59% Serge Lachapelle (M-L) 47 0.17	Daniel Breton
Viau	Odette Lavigne 3782 14.71%	David Heurtel 15945 62.02%	Wilner Cayo 2380 9.26	Geneviève Fortier-Moreau 2795 10.87%	Benjamin Michaud 177 0.69%	Marijo Bourgault 304 1.18%	Ana Da Silva (Pot) 145 0.56% Benoit Valiquette (Nul) 181 0.70%	David Heurtel

==== West ====
Electoral district	Candidates							Incumbent
Electoral district	PQ	Liberal	CAQ	QS	ON	Green	Other	Incumbent
Acadie	Évelyne Abitbol	Christine St-Pierre	Serge Pourreaux	Geneviève Dick	Julie Boivin	Alix Nyaburerwa	Yvon Breton (M-L)	Christine St-Pierre
D'Arcy-McGee	Éliane Pion	David Birnbaum	Elizabeth Smart	Suzanne Dufresne		Abraham Weizfeld		Lawrence Bergman
Jacques-Cartier	Laurence Desroches	Geoffrey Kelley	Denis Deguire	Jean-François Belley		James Maynard	Louis-Charles Fortier (Cons.)	Geoffrey Kelley
Marguerite-Bourgeoys	Richard Leboeuf-McGregor	Robert Poëti	Zoubir Bouchaala	Alexandre Émond	Myriam Drouin	Stéphanie Stevenson		Robert Poëti
Marquette	Élisabeth Fortin	François Ouimet	Marc Thériault	Marie-France Raymond-Dufour	Maude Paquette	John Symon	Thierry Bisaillon-Roy (Nul) Pierre Ennio Crespi (Cons.)	François Ouimet
Mont-Royal	Audrey Beauséjour	Pierre Arcand	Jamilla Leboeuf	Roy Semak		Darryl L Giraud	Hélène Floch (Cons.) Diane Johnston (M-L)	Pierre Arcand
Nelligan	Louis-David Bénard	Martin Coiteux	Albert Bitton		François Landry	Charles Bourassa	Trevor Pinto (Cons.)	Yolande James
Notre-Dame-de-Grâce	Olivier Sirard	Kathleen Weil	Noah Sidel	Annick Desjardins		Alex Tyrrell	Rachel Hoffman (M-L)	Kathleen Weil
Outremont	Roxanne Gendron	Hélène David	Rébecca McCann	Édith Laperle	Galia Vaillancourt	Théo Brière	Mathieu Marcil (Nul) Simon Pouliot (Cons.)	Philippe Couillard
Robert-Baldwin	Michaël Comtois-Lussier	Carlos Leitão	Jamie Allen	Ali Faour	Viviane Martinova-Croteau	Mathieu Mireault	Patricia Popert (Cons.)	Pierre Marsan
Saint-Henri–Sainte-Anne	Véronique Fournier	Marguerite Blais	Louis-Philippe Boulanger	Molly Alexander	Étienne Forest	Sharon Sweeney	Anna Kruzynski (Nul) Jairo Gaston Sanchez (Pot)	Marguerite Blais
Saint-Laurent	Rachid Bandou	Jean-Marc Fournier		Hasnaa Kadiri	Jennifer Beaudry	Tidiane Diallo	Fernand Deschamps (M-L) Guy Morissette (Cons.)	Jean-Marc Fournier
Verdun	Lorraine Pintal	Jacques Daoust	Benoit Richer	Rosa Pires	Julien Longchamp	Antonin Bergeron-Bossé	Raynald St-Onge (Pot) Eileen Studd (M-L)	Henri-François Gautrin
Westmount–Saint-Louis	Denise Laroche	Jacques Chagnon		Mélissa Desjardins		Lisa Julie Cahn	David Gerard (Cons.)	Jacques Chagnon

=== Outaouais ===
Electoral district	Candidates						Incumbent
Electoral district	PQ	Liberal	CAQ	QS	ON	Other	Incumbent
Chapleau	Yves Morin	Marc Carrière	Carl Pelletier	Laura Avalos	Philippe Boily	Roger Fleury (Green) Pierre Soublière (M-L)	Marc Carrière
Gatineau	Cédric Sarault	Stéphanie Vallée	André Paradis	Alexis Harvey	Marcel Vaive	Alexandre Deschênes (M-L)	Stéphanie Vallée
Hull	Gilles Aubé	Maryse Gaudreault	Jean Bosco Citegetse	Benoît Renaud	Eid Harb	Gabriel Girard Bernier (M-L)	Maryse Gaudreault
Papineau	Jean-François Primeau	Alexandre Iracà	René Langelier	Marc Sarazin	Jonathan Beauchamp	Christine Gagné (Nul)	Alexandre Iracá
Pontiac	Maryse Vallières-Murray	André Fortin	Michel Mongeon	Charmain Levy		Louis Lang (M-L)	Charlotte L'Écuyer

=== Abitibi-Témiscamingue and Nord-du-Québec ===
Electoral district	Candidates						Incumbent
Electoral district	PQ	Liberal	CAQ	QS	ON	Other	Incumbent
Abitibi-Est	Élizabeth Larouche	Guy Bourgeois	Sylvain Martel	Valérie Dufour	Richard Trudel	Maxym Perron-Tellier (Cons.)	Élizabeth Larouche
Abitibi-Ouest	François Gendron	Serge Bastien	Nadia Racine	Ghislaine Camirand	Grégory Vézeau		François Gendron
Rouyn-Noranda–Témiscamingue	Gilles Chapadeau	Luc Blanchette	Bernard Flébus	Guy Leclerc	Ghislain Dallaire		Gilles Chapadeau
Ungava	Luc Ferland	Jean Boucher	Michael Cameron	André Richer	Zoé Allen-Mercier	Matthew Guillemette (Nul)	Luc Ferland

=== Chaudière-Appalaches and Centre-du-Québec ===
Electoral district	Candidates							Incumbent
Electoral district	PQ	Liberal	CAQ	QS	ON	Conservative	Other	Incumbent
Arthabaska	Gaëtan St-Arnaud	Luc Dastous	Sylvie Roy	Christine Letendre		Jean Landry	François Fillion (Green)	Sylvie Roy
Beauce-Nord	Olivier Pouliot-Audet	José Couture	André Spénard	Mathieu Dumont	Lorenzo Tessier-Moreau	Éric Couture	Benoît Roy (Ind.)	André Spénard
Beauce-Sud	Alex Gagnon Lacroix	Robert Dutil	Samuel Poulin	Diane Vincent	Vanessa Roy	Stéphane Bégin	Robert Genesse (QRD) Jean Paquet (MPLQ)	Robert Dutil
Bellechasse	Linda Goupil	Dominique Vien	Stéphanie Lachance	Benoit Comeau	Mathilde Lefebvre	Patrice Aubin		Dominique Vien
Chutes-de-la-Chaudière	Catherine Paré	Ghyslain Vaillancourt	Marc Picard	Olivier Bolduc	Alexis Lévesque-Morin	Benoit Cloutier	Dave Gagné (PDSP)	Marc Picard
Drummond–Bois-Francs	Daniel Lebel	Isabelle Chabot	Sébastien Schneeberger	Francis Soulard	Alexandre Phénix	François Picard	Frédéric Bélanger (Nul)	Sébastien Schneeberger
Johnson	Yves-François Blanchet	Brigitte Mercier	André Lamontagne	François Desrochers	Magali Doucet	Benoit Lussier	Sébastien Gauthier (Nul)	Yves-François Blanchet
Lévis	Sylvie Girard	Simon Turmel	Christian Dubé	Yv Bonnier Viger	Nicolas Belley	Sébastien Roy	Paul Biron (UN)	Christian Dubé
Lotbinière-Frontenac	Kaven Mathieu	Laurent Lessard	Luc de la Sablonnière	Nadia Blouin	Annie Grégoire-Gauthier	Sylvain Rancourt	Denis Cadieux (MPLQ) Rodrigue Leblanc (Ind.)	Laurent Lessard
Nicolet-Bécancour	Jean-René Dubois	Denis Vallée	Donald Martel	Marc Dion	Marjolaine Lachapelle	Guillaume Laquerre		Donald Martel

=== Laval ===
Electoral district	Candidates						Incumbent
Electoral district	PQ	Liberal	CAQ	QS	ON	Other	Incumbent
Chomedey	Jean Cooke	Guy Ouellette	Carlie Dejoie	Lise-Anne Rheaume	Patrick Simard	Brendan Edge (Green) Emily Gagnon (Pot) Nick Keramarios (Cons.)	Guy Ouellette
Fabre	François-Gycelain Rocque	Gilles Ouimet	Christopher Skeete	Marie-Claire Des Rochers-Lamarche	Bernard Paré		Gilles Ouimet
Laval-des-Rapides	Léo Bureau-Blouin	Saul Polo	Vincent Bolduc	Nicolas Chatel-Launay	David Voyer	Léo McKenna (Green)	Léo Bureau-Blouin
Mille-Îles	Djemila Benhabib	Francine Charbonneau	Sylvain Loranger	Anik Paradis	Maël Rieussec	Bianca Jitaru (Green) David Mirabella (Cons.)	Francine Charbonneau
Sainte-Rose	Suzanne Proulx	Jean Habel	Domenico Cavaliere	André da Silva Pereira	Bruno Forget		Suzanne Proulx
Vimont	Jean Poirier	Jean Rousselle	Joseph Dydzak	Janina Moran	Étienne Boily	Jean-Marc Boyer (Ind.) Andréanne Demers (Green); Alain Robert (Cons.)	Jean Rousselle

=== Lanaudière ===
Electoral district	Candidates							Incumbent
Electoral district	PQ	Liberal	CAQ	QS	ON	Conservative	Other	Incumbent
Berthier	André Villeneuve	Pierre-Luc Bellerose	Elizabeth Leclerc	Louise Beaudry	Francis Lamarre		Pierre Baril (Green) Claude Dupré (MPLQ)	André Villeneuve
Joliette	Véronique Hivon	Robert Corriveau	Denise Larouche	Flavie Trudel	Sylvain Legault	Mikey Colangelo Lauzon		Véronique Hivon
L'Assomption	Pierre Paquette	Jean-Marc Bergevin	François Legault	Sylvain Fournier	Gabriel Gauthier	Charles-Étienne Raynault		François Legault
Masson	Diane Hamelin	Wenet Féné	Mathieu Lemay	Joëlle St-Pierre	Pierre-Alexandre Bugeaud	Éric Giroux		Diane Hamelin
Repentigny	Scott McKay	Robert Nantel	Lise Lavallée	Olivier Huard	Christian Strasbourg	Pierre Lacombe		Scott McKay
Rousseau	Nicolas Marceau	Mario Racette	Claude Charette	François Lépine	Chantal St-Onge			Nicolas Marceau
Terrebonne	Mathieu Traversy	Meriem Glia	Jean-François Jarry	Yan Smith	Jean-François Jacob			Mathieu Traversy

=== Laurentides ===
Electoral district	Candidates						Incumbent
Electoral district	PQ	Liberal	CAQ	QS	ON	Other	Incumbent
Argenteuil	Roland Richer	Yves St-Denis	Nicole Chouinard	Clotilde Bertrand	Samuel Cloutier	Serge Dupré (MPLQ) Rouge Lefebvre (Green)	Roland Richer
Bertrand	Claude Cousineau	Isabelle Leblond	Robert Milot	Lucie Mayer	Diane Massicotte	Patrick Dubé (Nul) Mario Roy (Ind.)	Claude Cousineau
Blainville	Gyslaine Desrosiers	Marie-Claude Collin	Mario Laframboise	Annie Giguère		Jean-Philippe Fournier (Cons.)	Daniel Ratthé
Deux-Montagnes	Daniel Goyer	Luc Leclerc	Benoit Charette	Duncan Hart Cameron	Louis-Félix Cauchon	Alec Ware (Équit.) Delia Fodor (Cons.)	Daniel Goyer
Groulx	Martine Desjardins	Vicki Emard	Claude Surprenant	Sylvie Giguère	Alain Marginean	Jonathan Davis (Nul)	Hélène Daneault
Labelle	Sylvain Pagé	Christian Lacroix	Cédrick Rémy-Quevedo	Gabriel Dagenais	Philippe Richard-Léonard		Sylvain Pagé
Mirabel	Denise Beaudoin	Ismaël Boisvert	Sylvie D'Amours	Mylène Jaccoud	Curtis Jean-Louis	Andre Linskiy (Cons.)	Denise Beaudoin
Saint-Jérôme	Pierre Karl Péladeau	Armand Dubois	Patrice Charbonneau	Vincent Lemay-Thivierge	Mathieu Trottier-Kavanagh	Bruno Morin (Cons.)	Jacques Duchesneau

=== Montérégie ===
==== Eastern ====
Electoral district	Candidates							Incumbent
Electoral district	PQ	Liberal	CAQ	QS	ON	Conservative	Other	Incumbent
Borduas	Pierre Duchesne	Jean Murray	Simon Jolin-Barrette	Jean Falardeau	Marc-Olivier Siouï	Gilbert Gour	Michel Lepage (PI)	Pierre Duchesne
Brome-Missisquoi	René Beauregard	Pierre Paradis	François Lemay	Benoit Van Caloen	Nicolas Pepin			Pierre Paradis
Chambly	Bertrand St-Arnaud	Magdala Ferdinand	Jean-François Roberge	Francis Vigeant	Martin Laramée	Michael Maher	Vincent Dessureault (Nul) Mary Harper (Green)	Bertrand St-Arnaud
Granby	Joanne Lalumière	Pascal Proulx	François Bonnardel	André Beauregard	Jocelyn Beaudoin		Stéphane Deschamps (Nul)	François Bonnardel
Iberville	Marie Bouillé	Chantal Tremblay	Claire Samson	Myriam-Zaa Normandin	Claude Savard			Marie Bouillé
Richelieu	Élaine Zakaïb	Alain Plante	Martin Baller	Marie-Ève Mathieu	Jean-François Tremblay	Marc Gaudet	Claude Bourgault (Green)	Élaine Zakaïb
Saint-Hyacinthe	Émilien Pelletier	Louise Arpin	Chantal Soucy	Danielle Pelland	Éric Pothier	Simon Labbé		Émilien Pelletier
Saint-Jean	Dave Turcotte	Marie-Josée Denis	Serge Tremblay	Carole Lusignan	Jade Bossé Bélanger	Maryse Grenier		Dave Turcotte
Verchères	Stéphane Bergeron	Simon Rocheleau	Yves Renaud	Céline Jarrousse	Mathieu Coulombe			Stéphane Bergeron

==== South Shore ====
Electoral district	Candidates							Incumbent
Electoral district	PQ	Liberal	CAQ	QS	ON	Conservative	Other	Incumbent
Beauharnois	Guy Leclair	Lyse Lemieux	Claude Moreau	Pierre-Paul St-Onge	Florence Rousseau	Julie De Bellefeuille	Yves de Repentigny (Équit.) Victoria Haliburton (Green); Sylvain Larocque (Ind.)	Guy Leclair
Châteauguay	Laurent Pilon	Pierre Moreau	Claudia Cloutier	Xavier P.-Laberge	Vincent Masse	Claude Chalhoub	François Mailly (QCU) Linda Sullivan (M-L)	Pierre Moreau
Huntingdon	Huguette Hébert	Stéphane Billette	Claire IsaBelle	Carmen Labelle	Yann Labrie	Albert De Martin	Louis-Paul Bourdon (PDSP)	Stéphane Billette
La Pinière		Gaétan Barrette	Jin Kim	Johane Beaupré	François Létourneau-Prézeau	Sebastian Fernandez	Fatima Houda-Pepin (Ind.)	Fatima Houda-Pepin
Laporte	Sophie Stanké	Nicole Ménard	Donald LeBlanc	Michèle St-Denis	Linda Dupuis	Christian Godin	Marcel Baril (Green)	Nicole Ménard
La Prairie	Pierre Langlois	Richard Merlini	Stéphane Le Bouyonnec	Marilou André	Jean-Pierre Gouin	Guy L'Heureux	Normand Chouinard (M-L)	Stéphane Le Bouyonnec
Marie-Victorin	Bernard Drainville	Jean-Guy Tremblay	Guillaume Provencher	Carl Lévesque	Fabien Villemaire		Pierre Chénier (M-L) Catherine Lovatt-Smith (Green); Florent Portron (Auto.)	Bernard Drainville
Montarville	Simon Prévost	Jacques Gendron	Nathalie Roy	Jean-Marc Ostiguy	Anthony van Duyse			Nathalie Roy
Sanguinet	Alain Therrien	Jean Paul Pellerin	Denis Leftakis	Christian Laramée	Robert Moreau	Alexandre Dagenais	Hélène Héroux (M-L)	Alain Therrien
Soulanges	Marie-Louise Séguin	Lucie Charlebois		Andrée Bessette	Patrick Marquis		Patricia Domingos (Équit.)	Lucie Charlebois
Taillon	Diane Lamarre	Maxime Tessier	Sébastien Vaillancourt	Manon Blanchard	Éric Gervais-Després			Marie Malavoy
Vachon	Martine Ouellet	Michel Bienvenu	Stéphane Robichaud	Sébastien Robert	Josée Létourneau		Hugo Boutin-Sinotte (Pot)	Martine Ouellet
Vaudreuil	Marcos Archambault	Marie-Claude Nichols	Luc Tison	David Fortin Côté	Jean-Gabriel Cauchon	Michel Paul	Léon Dupré (MPLQ) Julien Leclerc (Équit.); Thomas Radcliffe (Green)	Yvon Marcoux

== Results ==
↓
70	30	22	3
Liberal	PQ	CAQ	QS

=== Summary analysis ===
Popular vote
party	year	votes	change
Liberal	2012	31.20%	+10.32%
Liberal	2014	41.52%	+10.32%
PQ	2012	31.95%	-6.57%
PQ	2014	25.38%	-6.57%
CAQ	2012	27.05%	-4.00%
CAQ	2014	23.05%	-4.00%
QS	2012	6.03%	+1.60%
QS	2014	7.63%	+1.60%
Others	2012	3.77%	-1.35%
Others	2014	2.42%	-1.35%

Elections to the National Assembly of Quebec - seats won/lost by party, 2012-2014
Party	2012	Gain from(loss to)						2014
Party	2012	PQ		Lib	CAQ		QS	2014
Parti Québécois	54			(15)	1	(9)	(1)	30
Liberal	50	15			5			70
Coalition Avenir Québec	19	9	(1)	(5)				22
Québec solidaire	2	1						3
Total	125	25	(1)	(20)	6	(9)	(1)	125

Pairing off the top three parties, swings were calculated to be:

- PQ to Liberal: 8.45%
- CAQ to Liberal: 7.16%
- PQ to CAQ: 1.29%

=== Detailed analysis ===
Summary of the April 7, 2014, National Assembly of Quebec election results
Party	Party leader	Candidates	Seats					Popular vote		
Party	Party leader	Candidates	2012	Dissol.	2014	Change	%	Number	%	Change (pp)
Liberal	Philippe Couillard	125	50	49	70	+21	56.00	1,757,071	41.52	+10.32
Parti Québécois	Pauline Marois	124	54	54	30	-24	24.00	1,074,120	25.38	-6.57
Coalition Avenir Québec	François Legault	122	19	18	22	+4	17.60	975,607	23.05	-4.00
Québec solidaire	Françoise David, Andrés Fontecilla^{†}	124	2	2	3	+1	2.40	323,124	7.63	+1.60
Option nationale	Sol Zanetti	116	—	—	—	—	—	30,697	0.73	-1.16
Green	Alex Tyrrell	44	—	—	—	—	—	23,163	0.55	-0.44
Conservative	Adrien Pouliot	59	—	—	—	—	—	16,429	0.39	+0.21
Independent		11	—	2	—	—	—	15,361	0.36	+0.09
Parti nul	Renaud Blais	24	—	—	—	—	—	7,539	0.18	+0.12
Bloc Pot	Hugô St-Onge	14	—	—	—	—	—	2,690	0.06	+0.05
Marxist–Leninist	Pierre Chénier	24	—	—	—	—	—	2,016	0.05	±0.00
Parti équitable	Patricia Domingos	5	—	—	—	—	—	1,645	0.04	+0.04
Parti des sans Parti	Frank Malenfant	5	—	—	—	—	—	1,291	0.03	-0.09^{††}
Mon pays le Québec	Claude Dupré	6	*	—	—	*	—	521	0.01	*
Équipe Autonomiste	Guy Boivin	5	—	—	—	—	—	400	0.01	-0.04
Unité Nationale	Paul Biron	3	—	—	—	—	—	241	0.01	-0.02
Quebec – Democratic Revolution	Robert Genesse	1	—	—	—	—	—	163	0.00	-0.01
Parti indépendantiste	Michel Lepage	1	—	—	—	—	—	126	0.00	-0.03
Quebec Citizens' Union	Marc-André Lacroix	1	—	—	—	—	—	58	0.00	-0.05
Total		814	125	125	125	0	100.00	4,232,262	100.00	
Valid ballots								4,232,262	98.54	-0.24
Rejected ballots								62,793	1.46	+0.24
Voter turnout								4,295,055	71.44	-3.16
Registered electors								6,012,440		

Notes:

^{†} The party designates David and Fontecilla as co-spokespeople. The party's power is held by the general meetings of the members and a board of 16 directors; the de jure leader recognized by the Chief Electoral Officer of Quebec (DGE) is Pierre-Paul St-Onge.
^{††} Party contested the 2012 election under the name Coalition pour la constituante.
* Party did not nominate candidates in the previous election.

=== Vote and seat summaries ===
Ternary plots – shift of electoral support (2012–2014)
2012

2014
Electoral districts identified by colours of winning parties

Vote share
PLQ	41.52%
PQ	25.38%
CAQ	23.05%
QS	7.63%
Option nationale	0.73%
Green	0.55%
Others	1.15%

Seats
PLQ	56.00%
PQ	24.00%
CAQ	17.60%
QS	2.40%

=== Synopsis of results ===
Results by riding – 2014 Quebec general election
Riding	Winning party								Turnout (Note: including spoilt ballots)	Votes (Note: All parties with more than 1% of the vote are shown individually. Independent candidates and other minor parties are aggregated separately. Parties are presented in the order shown on EQ data.)									
Name	2012	1st place	Votes	Share	Margin #	Margin %	2nd place	3rd place	Turnout	PLQ	PQ	CAQ	QS	ON	PVQ	PCQ	Ind	Other	Total
Abitibi-Est	PQ	PLQ	8,476	41.09%	2,159	10.47%	PQ	CAQ	62.88%	8,476	6,317	3,927	1,469	235	–	202	–	–	20,626
Abitibi-Ouest	PQ	PQ	9,267	42.22%	1,652	7.53%	PLQ	CAQ	63.35%	7,615	9,267	3,084	1,354	627	–	–	–	–	21,947
Acadie	PLQ	PLQ	24,211	70.96%	20,226	59.28%	PQ	CAQ	69.70%	24,211	3,985	3,050	2,241	162	405	–	–	67	34,121
Anjou–Louis-Riel	PLQ	PLQ	16,049	50.81%	8,723	27.61%	PQ	CAQ	73.29%	16,049	7,326	5,315	2,448	147	303	–	–	–	31,588
Argenteuil	PQ	PLQ	11,676	38.25%	1,965	6.44%	PQ	CAQ	68.93%	11,676	9,711	7,212	1,395	112	370	–	–	51	30,527
Arthabaska	CAQ	CAQ	19,393	45.49%	6,512	15.27%	PLQ	PQ	73.27%	12,881	7,278	19,393	2,222	–	385	475	–	–	42,634
Beauce-Nord	CAQ	CAQ	15,761	50.89%	4,226	13.64%	PLQ	PQ	73.98%	11,535	2,128	15,761	887	105	–	432	125	–	30,973
Beauce-Sud	PLQ	PLQ	17,055	50.50%	4,146	12.28%	CAQ	PQ	70.80%	17,055	2,314	12,909	729	220	–	315	–	232	33,774
Beauharnois	PQ	PQ	11,891	38.83%	3,290	10.74%	PLQ	CAQ	67.96%	8,601	11,891	7,035	2,106	183	278	337	111	78	30,620
Bellechasse	PLQ	PLQ	15,843	49.27%	5,175	16.09%	CAQ	PQ	75.23%	15,843	4,283	10,668	865	116	–	378	–	–	32,153
Berthier	PQ	PQ	15,070	39.60%	3,256	8.56%	CAQ	PLQ	68.86%	7,570	15,070	11,814	2,666	261	483	–	–	193	38,057
Bertrand	PQ	PQ	15,232	37.34%	4,247	10.41%	CAQ	PLQ	71.10%	10,892	15,232	10,985	3,070	199	–	–	111	305	40,794
Blainville	CAQ	CAQ	15,075	33.92%	1,957	4.40%	PLQ	PQ	76.85%	13,118	13,046	15,075	2,898	–	–	312	–	–	44,449
Bonaventure	PQ	PQ	11,380	45.70%	872	3.50%	PLQ	QS	69.44%	10,508	11,380	1,061	1,540	130	–	–	–	283	24,902
Borduas	PQ	CAQ	14,331	33.50%	99	0.23%	PQ	PLQ	76.79%	9,944	14,232	14,331	3,678	246	–	225	–	126	42,782
Bourassa-Sauvé	PLQ	PLQ	17,905	60.48%	12,259	41.41%	PQ	CAQ	63.13%	17,905	5,646	3,624	1,747	119	351	–	–	214	29,606
Bourget	PQ	PQ	12,525	37.78%	2,958	8.92%	PLQ	CAQ	68.36%	9,567	12,525	6,510	3,714	243	489	–	–	101	33,149
Brome-Missisquoi	PLQ	PLQ	18,103	44.50%	6,754	16.60%	CAQ	PQ	73.13%	18,103	8,281	11,349	2,751	199	–	–	–	–	40,683
Chambly	PQ	CAQ	12,130	34.24%	408	1.15%	PQ	PLQ	76.62%	7,869	11,722	12,130	2,618	200	392	140	–	353	35,424
Champlain	PQ	PLQ	11,615	33.44%	1,046	3.01%	CAQ	PQ	72.23%	11,615 (Note: Pierre Michel Auger had been previously elected as an adéquiste MNA in 2007.)	10,481	10,569	1,848	222	–	–	–	–	34,735
Chapleau	PLQ	PLQ	19,697	57.83%	13,402	39.35%	PQ	CAQ	62.97%	19,697	6,295	5,022	1,996	256	693	–	–	101	34,060
Charlesbourg	CAQ	PLQ	16,934	42.07%	3,881	9.64%	CAQ	PQ	76.94%	16,934	7,215	13,053	1,936	257	–	450	–	407	40,252
Charlevoix–Côte-de-Beaupré	PQ	PLQ	13,083	35.24%	882	2.38%	PQ	CAQ	73.48%	13,083	12,201	9,682	1,539	287	–	332	–	–	37,124
Châteauguay	PLQ	PLQ	17,876	49.63%	9,619	26.71%	PQ	CAQ	72.56%	17,876	8,257	7,292	2,059	199	–	174	–	162	36,019
Chauveau	CAQ	CAQ	22,679	52.41%	9,739	22.51%	PLQ	PQ	76.02%	12,940	5,289	22,679	1,617	289	–	455	–	–	43,269
Chicoutimi	PQ	PQ	11,245	34.48%	1,605	4.92%	PLQ	CAQ	70.57%	9,640	11,245	5,691	2,105	327	–	–	3,601	–	32,609
Chomedey	PLQ	PLQ	30,604	73.02%	25,788	61.53%	PQ	CAQ	72.29%	30,604	4,816	4,658	1,164	130	347	–	–	191	41,910
Chutes-de-la-Chaudière	CAQ	CAQ	21,288	47.70%	6,779	15.19%	PLQ	PQ	81.06%	14,509	5,758	21,288	1,973	236	–	589	–	272	44,625
Côte-du-Sud	PLQ	PLQ	17,348	49.88%	9,255	26.61%	CAQ	PQ	69.58%	17,348	6,649	8,093	1,910	158	–	272	–	347	34,777
Crémazie	PQ	PLQ	13,440	39.00%	2,548	7.39%	PQ	CAQ	75.00%	13,440	10,892	4,731	4,726	227	448	–	–	–	34,464
D'Arcy-McGee	PLQ	PLQ	26,983	92.15%	26,267	89.71%	CAQ	QS	72.06%	26,983	524	716	604	–	454	–	–	–	29,281
Deux-Montagnes	PQ	CAQ	11,868	34.16%	761	2.19%	PQ	PLQ	74.45%	8,913	11,107	11,868	2,326	233	–	–	–	297	34,744
Drummond–Bois-Francs	CAQ	CAQ	13,600	39.92%	4,642	13.62%	PQ	PLQ	69.23%	8,595	8,958	13,600	2,116	155	–	285	–	361	34,070
Dubuc	PQ	PLQ	11,386	41.02%	2,467	8.89%	PQ	CAQ	70.48%	11,386	8,919	5,240	1,494	285	–	–	431	–	27,755
Duplessis	PQ	PQ	8,910	39.99%	397	1.78%	PLQ	CAQ	58.67%	8,513	8,910	2,898	1,502	458	–	–	–	–	22,281
Fabre	PLQ	PLQ	20,614	55.14%	12,816	34.28%	PQ	CAQ	77.23%	20,614	7,798	6,667	2,122	181	–	–	–	–	37,382
Gaspé	PQ	PQ	10,026	52.03%	3,513	18.23%	PLQ	CAQ	63.14%	6,513	10,026	1,192	989	194	–	99	–	255	19,268
Gatineau	PLQ	PLQ	22,852	61.58%	16,355	44.07%	PQ	CAQ	65.16%	22,852	6,497	5,198	2,255	160	–	–	–	146	37,108
Gouin	QS	QS	16,155	50.98%	9,717	30.66%	PQ	PLQ	73.18%	5,642	6,438	2,748	16,155	358	–	–	–	351	31,692
Granby	CAQ	CAQ	18,441	53.04%	10,811	31.10%	PQ	PLQ	69.51%	6,669	7,630	18,441	1,565	179	–	–	–	281	34,765
Groulx	CAQ	CAQ	12,776	30.85%	256	0.62%	PLQ	PQ	73.48%	12,520	12,424	12,776	2,810	384	–	–	–	493	41,407
Hochelaga-Maisonneuve	PQ	PQ	9,038	34.86%	1,112	4.29%	QS	PLQ	63.69%	4,675	9,038	3,097	7,926	316	352	–	–	521	25,925
Hull	PLQ	PLQ	18,213	55.17%	11,004	33.33%	PQ	QS	63.84%	18,213	7,209	3,609	3,647	189	–	–	–	146	33,013
Huntingdon	PLQ	PLQ	14,115	48.57%	7,240	24.91%	CAQ	PQ	70.12%	14,115	5,893	6,875	1,490	113	–	277	–	301	29,064
Iberville	PQ	CAQ	11,135	34.23%	886	2.72%	PQ	PLQ	71.00%	8,602	10,249	11,135	2,283	265	–	–	–	–	32,534
Îles-de-la-Madeleine	PQ	PLQ	4,137	50.07%	818	9.90%	PQ	QS	77.01%	4,137	3,319	262	499	46	–	–	–	–	8,263
Jacques-Cartier	PLQ	PLQ	30,823	85.42%	28,695	79.52%	CAQ	PQ	81.18%	30,823	1,079	2,128	855	–	966	232	–	–	36,083
Jeanne-Mance-Viger	PLQ	PLQ	27,007	78.53%	24,051	69.94%	PQ	CAQ	71.09%	27,007	2,956	2,820	1,154	–	379	–	–	73	34,389
Jean-Lesage	PLQ	PLQ	11,645	37.27%	4,214	13.49%	CAQ	PQ	67.91%	11,645	6,998	7,431	3,626	782	–	246	93	427	31,248
Jean-Talon	PLQ	PLQ	15,492	44.50%	7,668	22.03%	PQ	CAQ	77.94%	15,492	7,824	7,158	3,151	526	–	206	–	455	34,812
Johnson	PQ	CAQ	13,621	36.06%	1,853	4.91%	PQ	PLQ	67.44%	8,946	11,768	13,621	2,365	304	–	262	–	502	37,768
Joliette	PQ	PQ	17,477	44.33%	6,806	17.26%	CAQ	PLQ	69.85%	7,681	17,477	10,671	2,866	510	–	220	–	–	39,425
Jonquière	PQ	PQ	13,487	43.52%	5,233	16.88%	PLQ	CAQ	69.51%	8,254	13,487	7,318	1,608	326	–	–	–	–	30,993
Labelle	PQ	PQ	13,806	45.16%	6,155	20.13%	PLQ	CAQ	65.35%	7,651	13,806	6,447	2,457	211	–	–	–	–	30,572
Lac-Saint-Jean	PQ	PQ	13,159	44.53%	4,828	16.34%	PLQ	CAQ	69.84%	8,331	13,159	5,412	1,872	222	–	235	–	318	29,549
LaFontaine	PLQ	PLQ	22,476	73.26%	19,149	62.42%	PQ	CAQ	74.38%	22,476	3,327	3,303	1,189	116	233	–	–	34	30,678
La Peltrie	CAQ	CAQ	21,386	50.33%	7,024	16.53%	PLQ	PQ	77.15%	14,362	4,281	21,386	1,444	274	–	561	–	185	42,493
La Pinière	PLQ	PLQ	25,955	58.29%	15,503	34.82%	Ind	CAQ	74.77%	25,955	–	5,600	1,728	534	–	256	10,452	–	44,525
Laporte	PLQ	PLQ	15,804	47.65%	7,803	23.53%	PQ	CAQ	73.04%	15,804	8,001	5,919	2,530	182	573	156	–	–	33,165
La Prairie	CAQ	PLQ	11,110	33.95%	435	1.33%	CAQ	PQ	78.27%	11,110 (Note: Richard Merlini was previously elected as an adéquiste MNA in 2007.)	8,591	10,675	1,938	162	–	162	–	85	32,723
L'Assomption	CAQ	CAQ	18,719	49.38%	7,178	18.93%	PQ	PLQ	73.38%	5,057	11,541	18,719	2,198	226	–	169	–	–	37,910
Laurier-Dorion	PLQ	PLQ	15,566	46.19%	6,236	18.50%	QS	PQ	72.60%	15,566	5,369	2,431	9,330	263	482	–	–	259	33,700
Laval-des-Rapides	PQ	PLQ	16,880	44.20%	4,978	13.04%	PQ	CAQ	70.91%	16,880	11,902	6,552	2,151	188	516	–	–	–	38,189
Laviolette	PLQ	PLQ	12,422	52.58%	6,930	29.33%	PQ	CAQ	67.12%	12,422	5,492	4,432	1,104	124	–	–	–	52	23,626
Lévis	CAQ	CAQ	14,131	40.49%	1,943	5.57%	PLQ	PQ	75.43%	12,188	5,797	14,131	2,147	252	–	274	–	107	34,896
Lotbinière-Frontenac	PLQ	PLQ	19,296	48.96%	7,561	19.18%	CAQ	PQ	73.57%	19,296	6,147	11,735	1,403	193	–	414	143	83	39,414
Louis-Hébert	PLQ	PLQ	18,327	49.22%	8,677	23.30%	CAQ	PQ	83.66%	18,327	6,841	9,650	1,840	266	–	310	–	–	37,234
Marguerite-Bourgeoys	PLQ	PLQ	26,251	70.08%	21,060	56.22%	PQ	CAQ	72.34%	26,251	5,191	3,711	1,508	177	619	–	–	–	37,457
Marie-Victorin	PQ	PQ	11,614	38.17%	3,688	12.12%	PLQ	CAQ	66.32%	7,926	11,614	6,269	3,518	244	707	–	–	151	30,429
Marquette	PLQ	PLQ	20,342	62.51%	15,618	47.99%	PQ	CAQ	71.15%	20,342	4,724	4,358	1,915	151	679	195	–	178	32,542
Maskinongé	PLQ	PLQ	13,658	39.24%	3,812	10.95%	CAQ	PQ	73.82%	13,658	8,739	9,846	2,013	154	–	–	–	392	34,802
Masson	PQ	CAQ	13,235	38.35%	534	1.55%	PQ	PLQ	69.51%	5,869	12,701	13,235	2,168	289	–	249	–	–	34,511
Matane-Matapédia	PQ	PQ	18,025	61.16%	11,313	38.38%	PLQ	CAQ	63.20%	6,712	18,025	3,019	1,511	207	–	–	–	–	29,474
Mégantic	PLQ	PLQ	10,840	40.79%	2,961	11.14%	PQ	CAQ	69.85%	10,840	7,879	6,078	1,541	236	–	–	–	–	26,574
Mercier	QS	QS	13,228	46.19%	6,635	23.17%	PLQ	PQ	72.40%	6,593	5,872	2,400	13,228	228	–	–	129	189	28,639
Mille-Îles	PLQ	PLQ	16,499	50.50%	8,160	24.98%	PQ	CAQ	77.30%	16,499	8,339	5,757	1,545	84	348	98	–	–	32,670
Mirabel	PQ	CAQ	16,359	39.24%	2,069	4.96%	PQ	PLQ	70.48%	8,068	14,290	16,359	2,543	200	–	229	–	–	41,689
Montarville	CAQ	CAQ	14,999	35.04%	1,607	3.75%	PLQ	PQ	83.17%	13,392	11,268	14,999	2,845	301	–	–	–	–	42,805
Montmorency	CAQ	PLQ	17,113	40.42%	2,790	6.59%	CAQ	PQ	76.52%	17,113	7,242	14,323	1,981	255	407	1,015	–	–	42,336
Mont-Royal	PLQ	PLQ	23,297	80.06%	21,277	73.12%	CAQ	PQ	68.03%	23,297	1,603	2,020	1,440	–	526	161	–	51	29,098
Nelligan	PLQ	PLQ	36,494	80.34%	32,191	70.87%	CAQ	PQ	78.61%	36,494	3,153	4,303	–	245	1,060	169	–	–	45,424
Nicolet-Bécancour	CAQ	CAQ	11,168	38.64%	3,130	10.83%	PLQ	PQ	74.20%	8,038	6,433	11,168	2,290	638	–	333	–	–	28,900
Notre-Dame-de-Grâce	PLQ	PLQ	22,336	76.61%	20,172	69.19%	QS	CAQ	72.50%	22,336	1,610	1,649	2,164	–	1,318	–	–	78	29,155
Orford	PLQ	PLQ	13,055	44.09%	5,288	17.86%	PQ	CAQ	72.82%	13,055	7,767	6,227	2,291	273	–	–	–	–	29,613
Outremont	PLQ	PLQ	15,368	56.34%	10,747	39.40%	QS	PQ	69.46%	15,368	3,993	2,252	4,621	154	615	80	–	192	27,275
Papineau	PLQ	PLQ	18,330	50.35%	9,355	25.70%	PQ	CAQ	63.55%	18,330	8,975	5,860	2,432	309	–	–	–	498	36,404
Pointe-aux-Trembles	PQ	PQ	12,021	43.22%	5,329	19.16%	CAQ	PLQ	69.43%	6,229	12,021	6,692	2,165	234	332	–	–	138	27,811
Pontiac	PLQ	PLQ	25,659	75.76%	22,633	66.82%	CAQ	PQ	68.24%	25,659	2,897	3,026	2,157	–	–	–	–	131	33,870
Portneuf	CAQ	PLQ	12,779	41.42%	1,059	3.43%	CAQ	PQ	75.71%	12,779	4,525	11,720	1,209	227	–	391	–	–	30,851
René-Lévesque	PQ	PQ	11,029	55.00%	6,663	33.23%	PLQ	CAQ	59.36%	4,366	11,029	3,152	1,297	207	–	–	–	–	20,051
Repentigny	PQ	CAQ	13,889	36.07%	948	2.46%	PQ	PLQ	76.02%	8,721	12,941	13,889	2,490	260	–	204	–	–	38,505
Richelieu	PQ	PQ	11,695	39.02%	3,659	12.21%	CAQ	PLQ	69.58%	7,687	11,695	8,036	1,589	403	346	215	–	–	29,971
Richmond	PLQ	PLQ	17,178	41.16%	5,657	13.55%	PQ	CAQ	72.61%	17,178	11,521	9,197	2,833	236	563	209	–	–	41,737
Rimouski	PQ	PQ	12,028	40.58%	3,140	10.59%	PLQ	QS	67.27%	8,888	12,028	3,186	4,851	327	–	–	–	357	29,637
Rivière-du-Loup–Témiscouata	PLQ	PLQ	18,086	51.69%	9,708	27.75%	PQ	CAQ	70.00%	18,086	8,378	5,794	2,129	245	–	–	–	354	34,986
Robert-Baldwin	PLQ	PLQ	36,763	87.27%	34,602	82.14%	CAQ	PQ	76.99%	36,763	1,557	2,161	794	96	607	146	–	–	42,124
Roberval	PQ	PLQ	17,816	55.17%	7,052	21.84%	PQ	CAQ	72.29%	17,816	10,764	2,239	1,018	218	–	–	–	237	32,292
Rosemont	PQ	PQ	12,712	34.27%	1,598	4.31%	PLQ	QS	72.67%	11,114	12,712	5,252	6,930	321	488	–	–	278	37,095
Rousseau	PQ	PQ	15,480	38.73%	813	2.03%	CAQ	PLQ	64.47%	6,911	15,480	14,667	2,548	362	–	–	–	–	39,968
Rouyn-Noranda-Témiscamingue	PQ	PLQ	10,644	37.98%	1,610	5.74%	PQ	CAQ	64.25%	10,644	9,034	4,839	3,239	269	–	–	–	–	28,025
Sainte-Marie-Saint-Jacques	PQ	QS	8,437	30.60%	91	0.33%	PLQ	PQ	65.96%	8,346	7,612	2,364	8,437	210	393	–	–	211	27,573
Sainte-Rose	PQ	PLQ	16,520	42.20%	5,839	14.92%	PQ	CAQ	78.23%	16,520	10,681	9,413	2,262	269	–	–	–	–	39,145
Saint-François	PQ	PLQ	14,899	38.53%	2,174	5.62%	PQ	CAQ	70.15%	14,899	12,725	6,607	3,136	265	478	181	–	374	38,665
Saint-Henri-Sainte-Anne	PLQ	PLQ	19,795	52.52%	11,540	30.62%	PQ	CAQ	68.29%	19,795	8,255	4,218	4,029	225	700	–	–	467	37,689
Saint-Hyacinthe	PQ	CAQ	13,245	32.74%	1,222	3.02%	PQ	PLQ	71.58%	11,701	12,023	13,245	2,806	374	–	304	–	–	40,453
Saint-Jean	PQ	PQ	13,486	32.44%	563	1.35%	CAQ	PLQ	71.67%	11,845	13,486	12,923	2,693	386	–	243	–	–	41,576
Saint-Jérôme	CAQ	PQ	13,647	36.81%	1,962	5.29%	CAQ	PLQ	67.25%	7,400	13,647	11,685	3,991	200	–	151	–	–	37,074
Saint-Laurent	PLQ	PLQ	31,454	82.28%	28,348	74.16%	PQ	QS	70.28%	31,454	3,106	–	2,100	236	796	420	–	115	38,227
Saint-Maurice	PQ	PLQ	8,244	33.59%	653	2.66%	PQ	CAQ	68.30%	8,244	7,591	6,982	1,304	152	–	268	–	–	24,541
Sanguinet	PQ	PQ	10,096	35.06%	949	3.30%	CAQ	PLQ	74.15%	7,301	10,096	9,147	1,650	271	–	213	–	116	28,794
Sherbrooke	PQ	PLQ	12,380	36.44%	1,855	5.46%	PQ	CAQ	69.93%	12,380	10,525	5,672	4,393	321	328	181	48	130	33,978
Soulanges	PLQ	PLQ	18,925	54.40%	7,923	22.77%	PQ	QS	74.93%	18,925	11,002	–	3,425	478	–	–	–	961	34,791
Taillon	PQ	PQ	12,148	33.80%	1,372	3.82%	PLQ	CAQ	70.79%	10,776	12,148	8,704	3,994	320	–	–	–	–	35,942
Taschereau	PQ	PQ	11,376	31.66%	451	1.26%	PLQ	CAQ	73.41%	10,925	11,376	5,865	5,495	1,513	–	198	–	561	35,933
Terrebonne	PQ	PQ	14,450	36.22%	743	1.86%	CAQ	PLQ	74.20%	8,780	14,450	13,707	2,543	411	–	–	–	–	39,891
Trois-Rivières	PLQ	PLQ	11,658	39.16%	3,206	10.77%	PQ	CAQ	69.45%	11,658	8,452	6,634	2,531	238	–	260	–	–	29,773
Ungava	PQ	PLQ	4,615	42.34%	1,016	9.32%	PQ	CAQ	41.47%	4,615	3,599	1,800	512	235	–	–	–	140	10,901
Vachon	PQ	PQ	11,983	33.06%	176	0.49%	PLQ	CAQ	74.98%	11,807	11,983	9,164	2,644	280	–	–	–	371	36,249
Vanier-Les Rivières	CAQ	PLQ	18,398	43.64%	3,863	9.16%	CAQ	PQ	75.69%	18,398	6,337	14,535	1,920	400	–	564	–	–	42,154
Vaudreuil	PLQ	PLQ	27,750	61.19%	20,512	45.23%	PQ	CAQ	77.99%	27,750	7,238	7,084	2,101	115	584	196	–	280	45,348
Verchères	PQ	PQ	18,467	42.59%	5,307	12.24%	CAQ	PLQ	76.96%	8,213	18,467	13,160	3,074	450	–	–	–	–	43,364
Verdun	PLQ	PLQ	17,172	50.59%	8,901	26.22%	PQ	CAQ	70.69%	17,172	8,271	4,151	3,277	160	713	–	–	199	33,943
Viau	PLQ	PLQ	15,945	62.02%	12,163	47.31%	PQ	QS	63.33%	15,945	3,782	2,380	2,795	177	304	–	–	326	25,709
Vimont	PLQ	PLQ	17,584	50.48%	9,424	27.05%	PQ	CAQ	78.48%	17,584	8,160	6,632	1,676	192	372	104	117	–	34,837
Westmount-Saint-Louis	PLQ	PLQ	20,297	83.20%	18,703	76.67%	PQ	QS	62.03%	20,297	1,594	–	1,523	–	981	–	–	–	24,395

= open seat
= turnout is above provincial average
= winning candidate was in previous Legislature
= incumbent had switched allegiance
= previously incumbent in another riding
= not incumbent; was previously elected to the Legislature
= incumbency arose from byelection gain
= other incumbents renominated
= previously an MP in the House of Commons of Canada
= multiple candidates

=== Comparative analysis for ridings (2014 vs 2012) ===
Summary of riding results by turnout and vote share for winning candidate (vs 2012)
Riding and winning party			Turnout		Vote share	
Riding and winning party			%	Change (pp)	%	Change (pp)
Abitibi-Est	PLQ	Gain	62.88	−4.50	41.09	6.24
Abitibi-Ouest	PQ	Hold	63.35	−4.44	42.22	−9.16
Acadie	PLQ	Hold	69.70	4.93	70.96	15.30
Anjou–Louis-Riel	PLQ	Hold	73.29	−2.03	50.81	10.69
Argenteuil	PLQ	Gain	68.93	−5.40	38.25	9.20
Arthabaska	CAQ	Hold	73.27	−4.79	45.49	3.07
Beauce-Nord	CAQ	Hold	73.98	−2.60	50.89	−6.45
Beauce-Sud	PLQ	Hold	70.80	−3.21	50.50	8.11
Beauharnois	PQ	Hold	67.96	−7.11	38.83	−6.33
Bellechasse	PLQ	Hold	75.23	−0.88	49.27	8.60
Berthier	PQ	Hold	68.86	−6.83	39.60	−7.34
Bertrand	PQ	Hold	71.10	−6.63	37.34	−4.35
Blainville	CAQ	Hold	76.85	−5.01	33.92	−7.41
Bonaventure	PQ	Hold	69.44	0.13	45.70	−1.85
Borduas	CAQ	Gain	76.79	−7.67	33.50	−0.45
Bourassa-Sauvé	PLQ	Hold	63.13	−1.04	60.48	18.20
Bourget	PQ	Hold	68.36	−5.83	37.78	−7.90
Brome-Missisquoi	PLQ	Hold	73.13	−3.42	44.50	11.47
Chambly	CAQ	Gain	76.62	−6.89	34.24	0.08
Champlain	PLQ	Gain	72.23	−4.91	33.44	11.36
Chapleau	PLQ	Hold	62.97	−2.35	57.83	15.70
Charlesbourg	PLQ	Gain	76.94	−2.97	42.07	7.90
Charlevoix–Côte-de-Beaupré	PLQ	Gain	73.48	−2.47	35.24	8.18
Châteauguay	PLQ	Hold	72.56	−2.87	49.63	11.99
Chauveau	CAQ	Hold	76.02	−2.91	52.41	−0.58
Chicoutimi	PQ	Hold	70.57	−6.19	34.48	−10.02
Chomedey	PLQ	Hold	72.29	4.38	73.02	15.78
Chutes-de-la-Chaudière	CAQ	Hold	81.06	−3.06	47.70	−6.09
Côte-du-Sud	PLQ	Hold	69.58	−2.64	49.88	10.98
Crémazie	PLQ	Gain	75.00	−1.62	39.00	10.16
D'Arcy-McGee	PLQ	Hold	72.06	6.24	92.15	7.43
Deux-Montagnes	CAQ	Gain	74.45	−5.53	34.16	−1.09
Drummond–Bois-Francs	CAQ	Hold	69.23	−6.42	39.92	2.33
Dubuc	PLQ	Gain	70.48	−4.15	41.02	13.41
Duplessis	PQ	Hold	58.67	−2.93	39.99	−13.02
Fabre	PLQ	Hold	77.23	1.27	55.14	17.65
Gaspé	PQ	Hold	63.14	−4.44	52.03	−4.75
Gatineau	PLQ	Hold	65.16	−1.09	61.58	15.91
Gouin	QS	Hold	73.18	−4.75	50.98	4.95
Granby	CAQ	Hold	69.51	−6.63	53.04	0.90
Groulx	CAQ	Hold	73.48	−5.60	30.85	−7.17
Hochelaga-Maisonneuve	PQ	Hold	63.69	−6.38	34.86	−10.24
Hull	PLQ	Hold	63.84	−1.40	55.17	15.69
Huntingdon	PLQ	Hold	70.12	−3.21	48.57	8.96
Iberville	CAQ	Gain	71.00	−6.99	34.23	0.84
Îles-de-la-Madeleine	PLQ	Gain	77.01	−1.07	50.07	11.62
Jacques-Cartier	PLQ	Hold	81.18	4.29	85.42	12.32
Jean-Lesage	PLQ	Hold	67.91	−3.22	37.27	6.66
Jean-Talon	PLQ	Hold	77.94	−2.99	44.50	7.20
Jeanne-Mance-Viger	PLQ	Hold	71.09	3.69	78.53	13.15
Johnson	CAQ	Gain	67.44	−7.52	36.06	0.39
Joliette	PQ	Hold	69.85	−8.48	44.33	−2.79
Jonquière	PQ	Hold	69.51	−6.62	43.52	−4.71
L'Assomption	CAQ	Hold	73.38	−7.04	49.38	7.17
La Peltrie	CAQ	Hold	77.15	−1.91	50.33	−1.55
La Pinière	PLQ	Hold	74.77	2.64	58.29	9.04
La Prairie	PLQ	Gain	78.27	−4.18	33.95	6.48
Labelle	PQ	Hold	65.35	−7.02	45.16	−5.55
Lac-Saint-Jean	PQ	Hold	69.84	−5.69	44.53	−8.57
LaFontaine	PLQ	Hold	74.38	3.07	73.26	14.12
Laporte	PLQ	Hold	73.04	−3.29	47.65	10.46
Laurier-Dorion	PLQ	Hold	72.60	2.38	46.19	12.11
Laval-des-Rapides	PLQ	Gain	70.91	−2.46	44.20	11.93
Laviolette	PLQ	Hold	67.12	−4.73	52.58	9.41
Lévis	CAQ	Hold	75.43	−3.92	40.49	0.62
Lotbinière-Frontenac	PLQ	Hold	73.57	−3.49	48.96	5.64
Louis-Hébert	PLQ	Hold	83.66	−2.91	49.22	10.80
Marguerite-Bourgeoys	PLQ	Hold	72.34	3.29	70.08	13.17
Marie-Victorin	PQ	Hold	66.32	−5.55	38.17	−8.94
Marquette	PLQ	Hold	71.15	0.77	62.51	13.31
Maskinongé	PLQ	Hold	73.82	−4.15	39.24	7.18
Masson	CAQ	Gain	69.51	−8.66	38.35	2.21
Matane-Matapédia	PQ	Hold	63.20	−7.77	61.16	2.16
Mégantic	PLQ	Hold	69.85	−4.59	40.79	5.70
Mercier	QS	Hold	72.40	−3.87	46.19	−0.54
Mille-Îles	PLQ	Hold	77.30	−0.32	50.50	13.11
Mirabel	CAQ	Gain	70.48	−7.91	39.24	2.89
Mont-Royal	PLQ	Hold	68.03	5.83	80.06	13.84
Montarville	CAQ	Hold	83.17	−4.49	35.04	−0.70
Montmorency	PLQ	Gain	76.52	−1.84	40.42	7.20
Nelligan	PLQ	Hold	78.61	5.40	80.34	14.03
Nicolet-Bécancour	CAQ	Hold	74.20	−4.41	38.64	6.64
Notre-Dame-de-Grâce	PLQ	Hold	72.50	4.56	76.61	13.96
Orford	PLQ	Hold	72.82	−5.28	44.09	7.51
Outremont	PLQ	Hold	69.46	1.25	56.34	14.83
Papineau	PLQ	Hold	63.55	−2.98	50.35	15.59
Pointe-aux-Trembles	PQ	Hold	69.43	−6.93	43.22	−7.04
Pontiac	PLQ	Hold	68.24	6.11	75.76	19.13
Portneuf	PLQ	Gain	75.71	−2.10	41.42	7.88
René-Lévesque	PQ	Hold	59.36	−7.31	55.00	−4.67
Repentigny	CAQ	Gain	76.02	−6.45	36.07	−1.63
Richelieu	PQ	Hold	69.58	−8.11	39.02	−4.03
Richmond	PLQ	Hold	72.61	−6.64	41.16	5.65
Rimouski	PQ	Hold	67.27	−8.29	40.58	−7.76
Rivière-du-Loup–Témiscouata	PLQ	Hold	70.00	−4.57	51.69	10.79
Robert-Baldwin	PLQ	Hold	76.99	7.89	87.27	12.06
Roberval	PLQ	Gain	72.29	−0.30	55.17	26.79
Rosemont	PQ	Hold	72.67	−3.44	34.27	−9.40
Rousseau	PQ	Hold	64.47	−8.07	38.73	−2.99
Rouyn-Noranda-Témiscamingue	PLQ	Gain	64.25	−4.77	37.98	11.49
Saint-François	PLQ	Gain	70.15	−7.10	38.53	2.35
Saint-Henri-Sainte-Anne	PLQ	Hold	68.29	0.18	52.52	14.06
Saint-Hyacinthe	CAQ	Gain	71.58	−7.10	32.74	1.21
Saint-Jean	PQ	Hold	71.67	−6.67	32.44	−8.29
Saint-Jérôme	PQ	Gain	67.25	−8.16	36.81	−0.93
Saint-Laurent	PLQ	Hold	70.28	5.77	82.28	16.61
Saint-Maurice	PLQ	Gain	68.30	−5.25	33.59	6.43
Sainte-Marie-Saint-Jacques	QS	Gain	65.96	−2.22	30.60	5.17
Sainte-Rose	PLQ	Gain	78.23	−0.89	42.20	13.67
Sanguinet	PQ	Hold	74.15	−6.24	35.06	−5.62
Sherbrooke	PLQ	Gain	69.93	−8.17	36.44	1.31
Soulanges	PLQ	Hold	74.93	−4.07	54.40	19.35
Taillon	PQ	Hold	70.79	−5.98	33.80	−6.41
Taschereau	PQ	Hold	73.41	−3.95	31.66	−5.40
Terrebonne	PQ	Hold	74.20	−6.00	36.22	−8.31
Trois-Rivières	PLQ	Hold	69.45	−5.76	39.16	4.01
Ungava	PLQ	Gain	41.47	−0.15	42.34	7.63
Vachon	PQ	Hold	74.98	−3.69	33.06	−6.53
Vanier-Les Rivières	PLQ	Gain	75.69	−2.98	43.64	8.81
Vaudreuil	PLQ	Hold	77.99	1.56	61.19	16.13
Verchères	PQ	Hold	76.96	−7.18	42.59	−4.68
Verdun	PLQ	Hold	70.69	−0.68	50.59	15.17
Viau	PLQ	Hold	63.33	0.98	62.02	14.74
Vimont	PLQ	Hold	78.48	−0.86	50.48	13.00
Westmount-Saint-Louis	PLQ	Hold	62.03	2.59	83.20	15.51

=== Analysis of changes in party vote shares ===
Share change analysis by party and riding (2014 vs 2012)
Riding	PLQ		PQ		CAQ		QS	
Riding	%	Change (pp)	%	Change (pp)	%	Change (pp)	%	Change (pp)
Abitibi-Est	41.09	6.24	30.63	−7.77	19.04	0.55	7.12	2.35
Abitibi-Ouest	34.70	15.96	42.22	−9.16	14.05	−6.22	6.17	0.80
Acadie	70.96	15.30	11.68	−5.54	8.94	−8.52	6.57	−1.44
Anjou-Louis-Riel	50.81	10.69	23.19	−7.77	16.83	−2.91	7.75	0.48
Argenteuil	38.25	9.20	31.81	−6.71	23.62	−2.87	4.57	1.92
Arthabaska	30.21	−0.17	17.07	−2.98	45.49	3.07	5.21	1.25
Beauce-Nord	37.24	12.03	6.87	−3.27	50.89	−6.45	2.86	0.66
Beauce-Sud	50.50	8.11	6.85	−4.57	38.22	−2.30	2.16	−0.31
Beauharnois	28.09	7.59	38.83	−6.33	22.98	−2.71	6.88	2.91
Bellechasse	49.27	8.60	13.32	−1.86	33.18	−5.33	2.69	−0.38
Berthier	19.89	6.76	39.60	−7.34	31.04	−1.20	7.01	2.18
Bertrand	26.70	9.39	37.34	−4.35	26.93	−4.97	7.53	2.17
Blainville	29.51	13.66	29.35	−6.17	33.92	−7.41	6.52	2.63
Bonaventure	42.20	7.30	45.70	−1.85	4.26	−6.88	6.18	1.04
Borduas	23.24	6.12	33.27	−6.06	33.50	−0.45	8.60	2.78
Bourassa-Sauvé	60.48	18.20	19.07	−8.26	12.24	−5.20	5.90	−4.38
Bourget	28.86	9.45	37.78	−7.90	19.64	−1.29	11.20	1.77
Brome-Missisquoi	44.50	11.47	20.35	−5.10	27.90	−4.40	6.76	2.12
Chambly	22.21	5.73	33.09	−7.04	34.24	0.08	7.39	2.40
Champlain	33.44	11.36	30.17	−6.56	30.43	−2.52	5.32	1.17
Chapleau	57.83	15.7	18.48	−7.53	14.74	−8.55	5.86	0.94
Charlesbourg	42.07	7.90	17.92	−3.23	32.43	−4.46	4.81	0.92
Charlevoix-Côte-de-Beaupré	35.24	8.18	32.87	−7.78	26.08	−0.72	4.15	0.92
Châteauguay	49.63	11.99	22.92	−8.67	20.24	−3.55	5.72	2.39
Chauveau	29.91	5.26	12.22	−4.15	52.41	−0.58	3.74	0.72
Chicoutimi	29.56	7.19	34.48	−10.02	17.45	−7.56	6.46	1.50
Chomedey	73.02	15.78	11.49	−5.09	11.11	−8.18	2.78	−0.78
Chutes-de-la-Chaudière	32.51	9.56	12.90	−4.12	47.70	−6.09	4.42	0.59
Côte-du-Sud	49.88	10.98	19.12	−6.62	23.27	−6.51	5.49	2.11
Crémazie	39.00	10.16	31.60	−7.01	13.73	−3.38	13.71	2.14
D'Arcy-McGee	92.15	7.43	1.79	−1.13	2.45	−4.92	2.06	−1.69
Deux-Montagnes	25.65	7.66	31.97	−6.83	34.16	−1.09	6.69	2.60
Drummond-Bois-Francs	25.23	2.94	26.29	−4.51	39.92	2.33	6.21	1.86
Dubuc	41.02	13.41	32.13	−10.05	18.88	−4.77	5.38	1.56
Duplessis	38.21	11.94	39.99	−13.02	13.01	1.48	6.74	2.33
Fabre	55.14	17.65	20.86	−7.11	17.83	−9.93	5.68	2.13
Gaspé	33.80	5.69	52.03	−4.75	6.19	−3.28	5.13	1.39
Gatineau	61.58	15.91	17.51	−9.85	14.01	−4.77	6.08	1.61
Gouin	17.80	6.14	20.31	−12.17	8.67	0.61	50.98	4.95
Granby	19.18	3.02	21.95	−0.77	53.04	0.90	4.50	−1.16
Groulx	30.24	10.27	30.00	−4.00	30.85	−7.17	6.79	2.48
Hochelaga-Maisonneuve	18.03	6.50	34.86	−10.24	11.95	−0.66	30.57	6.88
Hull	55.17	15.69	21.84	−10.23	10.93	−5.01	11.05	3.11
Huntingdon	48.57	8.96	20.28	−6.38	23.65	−2.05	5.13	1.41
Iberville	26.44	7.15	31.50	−7.40	34.23	0.84	7.02	2.89
Îles-de-la-Madeleine	50.07	11.62	40.17	−10.84	3.17	−1.65	6.04	1.26
Jacques-Cartier	85.42	12.32	2.99	−0.68	5.90	−9.02	2.37	−0.19
Jean-Lesage	37.27	6.66	22.40	−6.21	23.78	−3.53	11.60	3.63
Jeanne-Mance-Viger	78.53	13.15	8.60	−4.83	8.20	−6.32	3.36	−1.70
Jean-Talon	44.50	7.20	22.48	−5.26	20.56	−3.55	9.05	2.65
Johnson	23.69	3.36	31.16	−5.00	36.06	0.39	6.26	1.71
Joliette	19.48	5.46	44.33	−2.79	27.07	−2.82	7.27	1.64
Jonquière	26.63	6.58	43.52	−4.71	23.61	−1.45	5.19	1.99
La Peltrie	33.80	5.94	10.07	−4.32	50.33	−1.55	3.40	0.86
La Pinière	58.29	9.04	–	−17.85	12.58	−11.92	3.88	−0.51
La Prairie	33.95	6.48	26.25	−6.17	32.62	−0.02	5.92	2.41
Labelle	25.03	8.06	45.16	−5.55	21.09	−2.77	8.04	2.20
Lac-Saint-Jean	28.19	11.70	44.53	−8.57	18.32	−5.79	6.34	2.54
LaFontaine	73.26	14.12	10.84	−5.87	10.77	−5.60	3.88	−0.45
Laporte	47.65	10.46	24.12	−7.05	17.85	−5.42	7.63	1.70
L'Assomption	13.34	1.80	30.44	−9.12	49.38	7.17	5.80	2.20
Laurier-Dorion	46.19	12.11	15.93	−10.51	7.21	−2.57	27.69	3.35
Laval-des-Rapides	44.20	11.93	31.17	−7.17	17.16	−4.64	5.63	1.42
Laviolette	52.58	9.41	23.25	−7.58	18.76	−0.78	4.67	0.91
Lévis	34.93	4.04	16.61	−3.43	40.49	0.62	6.15	0.93
Lotbinière-Frontenac	48.96	5.64	15.60	−5.54	29.77	−1.40	3.56	−0.81
Louis-Hébert	49.22	10.80	18.37	−3.01	25.92	−7.00	4.94	1.37
Marguerite-Bourgeoys	70.08	13.17	13.86	−5.91	9.91	−7.47	4.03	−0.06
Marie-Victorin	26.05	8.51	38.17	−8.94	20.60	−1.02	11.56	3.35
Marquette	62.51	13.31	14.52	−6.91	13.39	−6.17	5.88	0.66
Maskinongé	39.24	7.18	25.11	−4.79	28.29	−1.66	5.78	2.12
Masson	17.01	5.96	36.80	−9.15	38.35	2.21	6.28	3.11
Matane-Matapédia	22.77	4.08	61.16	2.16	10.24	−5.67	5.13	1.46
Mégantic	40.79	5.70	29.65	−1.57	22.87	−2.74	5.80	0.40
Mercier	23.02	9.52	20.50	−3.04	8.38	−2.63	46.19	−0.54
Mille-Îles	50.50	13.11	25.52	−6.24	17.62	−5.75	4.73	–
Mirabel	19.35	6.28	34.28	−9.49	39.24	2.89	6.10	2.31
Montarville	31.29	6.80	26.32	−5.17	35.04	−0.70	6.65	2.18
Montmorency	40.42	7.20	17.11	−3.45	33.83	−4.38	4.68	1.24
Mont-Royal	80.06	13.84	5.51	−3.41	6.94	−6.34	4.95	−1.88
Nelligan	80.34	14.03	6.94	−2.03	9.47	−9.00	–	−2.33
Nicolet-Bécancour	27.81	5.35	22.26	3.72	38.64	6.64	7.92	7.92
Notre-Dame-de-Grâce	76.61	13.96	5.52	−2.76	5.66	−7.96	7.42	−1.14
Orford	44.09	7.51	26.23	−4.32	21.03	−3.12	7.74	2.35
Outremont	56.34	14.83	14.64	−8.56	8.26	−5.74	16.94	−1.07
Papineau	50.35	15.59	24.65	−9.66	16.10	−5.88	6.68	1.43
Pointe-aux-Trembles	22.40	6.96	43.22	−7.04	24.06	−0.16	7.78	1.88
Pontiac	75.76	19.13	8.55	−7.57	8.93	−9.13	6.37	1.15
Portneuf	41.42	7.88	14.67	−3.29	37.99	−2.66	3.92	0.91
René-Lévesque	21.77	3.57	55.00	−4.67	15.72	−0.23	6.47	2.56
Repentigny	22.65	7.55	33.61	−7.09	36.07	−1.63	6.47	2.27
Richelieu	25.65	7.42	39.02	−4.03	26.81	−5.52	5.30	2.08
Richmond	41.16	5.65	27.60	−7.30	22.04	0.35	6.79	2.66
Rimouski	29.99	8.03	40.58	−7.76	10.75	−6.45	16.37	9.08
Rivière-du-Loup-Témiscouata	51.69	10.79	23.95	−10.42	16.56	−2.00	6.09	3.10
Robert-Baldwin	87.27	12.06	3.70	−1.64	5.13	−7.85	1.88	−1.03
Roberval	55.17	26.79	33.33	−13.37	6.93	−12.44	3.15	−0.88
Rosemont	29.96	9.57	34.27	−9.40	14.16	−3.17	18.68	4.20
Rousseau	17.29	5.35	38.73	−2.99	36.70	−2.45	6.38	1.39
Rouyn-Noranda-Témiscamingue	37.98	11.49	32.24	−4.54	17.27	−6.43	11.56	1.80
Saint-François	38.53	2.35	32.91	−3.42	17.09	−0.97	8.11	3.12
Saint-Henri-Sainte-Anne	52.52	14.06	21.90	−10.17	11.19	−4.24	10.69	−0.62
Saint-Hyacinthe	28.92	5.09	29.72	−6.60	32.74	1.21	6.94	1.97
Saint-Jean	28.49	8.56	32.44	−8.29	31.08	−1.09	6.48	2.28
Saint-Jérôme	19.96	7.40	36.81	−0.93	31.52	−8.44	10.76	3.60
Saint-Laurent	82.28	16.61	8.13	−3.20	–	−14.32	5.49	0.48
Saint-Maurice	33.59	6.43	30.93	−4.72	28.45	–	5.31	0.57
Sainte-Marie-Saint-Jacques	30.27	10.88	27.61	−8.15	8.57	−6.21	30.60	5.17
Sainte-Rose	42.20	13.67	27.29	−7.58	24.05	−5.56	5.78	1.42
Sanguinet	25.36	5.41	35.06	−5.62	31.77	−0.61	5.73	2.26
Sherbrooke	36.44	1.31	30.98	−11.15	16.69	4.89	12.93	6.08
Soulanges	54.40	19.35	31.62	0.72	–	−28.03	9.84	6.22
Taillon	29.98	10.61	33.80	−6.41	24.22	−3.71	11.11	3.66
Taschereau	30.40	4.72	31.66	−5.40	16.32	−0.39	15.29	3.60
Terrebonne	22.01	8.83	36.22	−8.31	34.36	−1.66	6.37	3.15
Trois-Rivières	39.16	4.01	28.39	−3.64	22.28	−0.98	8.50	3.46
Ungava	42.34	7.63	33.02	−12.51	16.51	5.48	4.70	−1.45
Vachon	32.57	11.30	33.06	−6.53	25.28	−4.35	7.29	2.25
Vanier-Les Rivières	43.64	8.81	15.03	−3.63	34.48	−3.44	4.55	1.37
Vaudreuil	61.19	16.13	15.96	−4.74	15.62	−9.99	4.63	−0.25
Verchères	18.94	5.18	42.59	−4.68	30.35	−1.12	7.09	3.02
Verdun	50.59	15.17	24.37	−9.43	12.23	−6.71	9.65	2.38
Viau	62.02	14.74	14.71	−8.95	9.26	−3.19	10.87	−0.65
Vimont	50.48	13.00	23.42	−7.10	19.04	−5.65	4.81	0.84
Westmount-Saint-Louis	83.20	15.51	6.53	−0.93	–	−13.11	6.24	−0.16

=== Seats that changed hands ===
Elections to the National Assembly – seats won/lost by party, 2012–2014
Party	2012	Gain from (loss to)								2014
Party	2012	PLQ		PQ		CAQ		QS		2014
Liberal	50			15		5				70
Parti Québécois	54		(15)			1	(9)		(1)	30
Coalition Avenir Québec	19		(5)	9	(1)					22
Québec solidaire	2			1						3
Total	125	–	(20)	25	(1)	6	(9)	–	(1)	125

=== Summary analysis ===
Party candidates in 2nd place
Party in 1st place	Party in 2nd place					Total
Party in 1st place	Lib	PQ	CAQ	QS	Ind	Total
Liberal		45	21	3	1	70
Parti Québécois	18		11	1		30
Coalition Avenir Québec	10	12				22
Québec solidaire	2	1				3
Total	30	58	32	4	1	125

Candidates ranked 1st to 5th place, by party
Parties	1st	2nd	3rd	4th	5th
█ Liberal	70	30	25		
█ Parti Québécois	30	58	34	2	
█ Coalition Avenir Québec	22	32	56	12	
█ Québec solidaire	3	4	10	105	2
█ Independent		1		1	1
█ Green				4	36
█ Parti équitable				1	1
█ Option nationale					47
█ Conservative					22
█ Parti nul					11
█ Parti des sans Parti					3
█ Bloc Pot					1
█ Marxist–Leninist					1

Resulting composition of the National Assembly (2014)
Source		Party				
Source		Lib	PQ	CAQ	QS	Total
Seats retained	Incumbents returned	40	27	11	2	80
Seats retained	Open seats held	9	2	2		13
Seats retained	Ouster of incumbent changing allegiance	1				1
Seats changing hands	Incumbents defeated - new MNAs	14		8	1	23
Seats changing hands	Incumbents defeated - previous MNAs returned	5		1		6
Seats changing hands	Incumbents defeated - taken by incumbent from another riding	1				1
Seats changing hands	Open seats gained		1			1
Total		70	30	22	3	125

== See also ==
- 40th Quebec Legislature
- Politics of Quebec
- List of premiers of Quebec
- List of leaders of the Official Opposition (Quebec)
- National Assembly of Quebec
- Timeline of Quebec history
- Political parties in Quebec
