= Groulx =

Provincial electoral district in Quebec, Canada

Coordinates: 45.6277°N 73.8192°W

Quebec electoral district
- Location in Thérèse-De Blainville

Provincial electoral district
- Legislature: National Assembly of Quebec
MNA
Marie-Claude Sarrazin
Parti Québécois
- District created: 1980
- First contested: 1981
- Last contested: 2026

Demographics
- Population (2011): 74,165
- Electors (2012): 56,154
- Area (km²): 53.9
- Pop. density (per km²): 1,376
- Census division: Thérèse-De Blainville (part)
- Census subdivision(s): Boisbriand, Rosemère, Sainte-Thérèse

Groulx is a provincial electoral district in the Laurentides region of Quebec, Canada, that elects members to the National Assembly of Quebec. It notably includes the city of Boisbriand as well as a few other small cities.

It was created for the 1981 election from a part of the Terrebonne electoral district.

In the change from the 2001 to the 2011 electoral map, it gained a small part of the city of Blainville from the Blainville electoral district; it did not previously include any part of that city.

In the change from the 2011 to 2017 electoral map, the riding lost the Saint-Rédempteur neighbourhood of Blainville to the riding of Blainville.

From its creation in 1981 until 2007, Groulx was a bellwether riding always sending a member from the governing party to the National Assembly. Since the ADQ breakthrough in the suburbs of Montreal in 2007, the riding has been targeted by all major parties and is part of a collection of ridings that determine Quebec elections. The riding is overwhelmingly francophone and white, and has a strong nationalist undercurrent, making it a battleground riding between the Parti Québécois, ADQ/CAQ, and the Quebec Liberals.

In 2014, the PQ nominated Martine Desjardins, a former leader of the FEUQ during the 2012 student strike, and she was seen as a star candidate. Although the PQ began the campaign with a strong lead among francophones and heavily targeted CAQ-held ridings such as Groulx, the party’s decline and the CAQ’s rise during the final two weeks of the campaign kept the riding in CAQ hands, albeit in a tight three-way race in which no candidate received more than 31% of the vote.

== Members of the National Assembly ==
Legislature	Years	Member	Party
Riding created from Terrebonne
32nd	1981–1985	Élie Fallu	Parti Québécois
33rd	1985–1989	Madeleine Bleau	Liberal
34th	1989–1994	Madeleine Bleau	Liberal
35th	1994–1998	Robert Kieffer	Parti Québécois
36th	1998–2003	Robert Kieffer	Parti Québécois
37th	2003–2007	Pierre Descoteaux	Liberal
38th	2007–2008	Linda Lapointe	Action démocratique
39th	2008–2011	René Gauvreau	Parti Québécois
39th	2011–2012	René Gauvreau	Independent
39th	2012–2012	René Gauvreau	Parti Québécois
40th	2012–2014	Hélène Daneault	Coalition Avenir Québec
41st	2014–2017	Claude Surprenant	Coalition Avenir Québec
41st	2017–2018	Claude Surprenant	Independent
42nd	2018–2022	Eric Girard	Coalition Avenir Québec
43rd	2022–2026	Eric Girard	Coalition Avenir Québec
44th	2026–Present	Marie-Claude Sarrazin	Parti Québécois

== Election results ==
2026 Quebec general election
** Preliminary results — Not yet official **
Party	Candidate	Votes	%	±%
Parti Québécois	Marie-Claude Sarrazin	11,742	32.17	+16.86
Liberal	Julie Tourangeau	8,621	23.62	+12.60
Coalition Avenir Québec	Eric Girard	6,474	17.74	–30.01
Conservative	Ariane Desrochers	5,284	14.48	+5.78
Québec solidaire	Marie-Noëlle Aubertin	4,053	11.10	–5.11
Climat Québec	Samuel Beauchamp	330	0.90	N/A
Total valid votes		36,504	98.30	
Total rejected ballots		630	1.70	
Turnout		37,134	68.41	
Electors on the lists		54,278		
Parti Québécois gain from Coalition Avenir Québec		Swing		+2.13
Source: Élections Québec

2022 Quebec general election
Party	Candidate	Votes	%	±%
Coalition Avenir Québec	Eric Girard	17,431	47.75%	+7.14%
Québec solidaire	Marie-Noëlle Aubertin	5,919	16.21%	-1.02%
Parti Québécois	Jeanne Craig-Larouche	5,588	15.31%	-0.49%
Liberal	Audrey Medaino-Tardif	4,024	11.02%	-9.24%
Conservative	Valerie Messore	3,177	8.70%	+7.69%
Green	Victoria Shahsavar-Arshad	368	1.01%	-1.20%
Total valid votes		36,507	–	
Total rejected ballots			–	
Turnout				
Electors on the lists			–	–

2018 Quebec general election
Party	Candidate	Votes	%	±%
Coalition Avenir Québec	Eric Girard	14,771	40.61	+9.76
Liberal	Sabrina Chartrand	7,369	20.26	-9.98
Québec solidaire	Fabien Torres	6,268	17.23	+10.44
Parti Québécois	Jean-Philippe Meloche	5,745	15.8	-14.2
Independent	Claude Surprenant	812	2.23	
Green	Robin Dick	802	2.21	
Conservative	Vincent Aubé	368	1.01	
Citoyens au pouvoir	Chantal Lavoie	235	0.65	
Total valid votes		36,370	98.37	
Total rejected ballots		604	1.63	
Turnout		36,974	70.25	
Eligible voters		52,633		
Coalition Avenir Québec hold		Swing		+9.87
Source(s) "Rapport des résultats officiels du scrutin". Élections Québec.

2014 Quebec general election
Party	Candidate	Votes	%	±%
Coalition Avenir Québec	Claude Surprenant	12,776	30.85	-7.17
Liberal	Vicki Emard	12,520	30.24	+10.27
Parti Québécois	Martine Desjardins	12,424	30.00	-4.00
Québec solidaire	Sylvie Giguère	2,810	6.79	+2.49
Parti nul	Jonathan Davis	493	1.19	–
Option nationale	Alain Marginean	384	0.93	-1.11
Total valid votes		41,407	98.49	–
Total rejected ballots		635	1.51	+0.36
Turnout		42,042	73.48	-5.60
Electors on the lists		57,216	–	–
Coalition Avenir Québec hold		Swing		-8.72

2012 Quebec general election
Party	Candidate	Votes	%	±%
Coalition Avenir Québec	Hélène Daneault	16,711	38.02	+17.57
Parti Québécois	Raymond Archambault	14,948	34.01	-4.05
Liberal	Linda Lapointe	8,776	19.97	-15.70
Québec solidaire	Sylvie Giguère	1,892	4.30	+1.92
Option nationale	Alain Marginean	895	2.04	–
Green	Alec Ware	591	1.34	-1.80
Independent	Alex Munteanu	140	0.32	–
Total valid votes		43,953	98.85	–
Total rejected ballots		511	1.15	–
Turnout		44,464	79.08	
Electors on the lists		56,228	–	–
Coalition Avenir Québec gain from Parti Québécois		Swing		+10.81

^ Change is from redistributed results. CAQ change is from ADQ.

2008 Quebec general election
Party	Candidate	Votes	%	±%
Parti Québécois	René Gauvreau	11,226	37.62	+8.73
Liberal	Monique Laurin	10,823	36.27	+9.07
Action démocratique	Linda Lapointe	6,036	20.23	-17.22
Green	Carmen Brisebois	955	3.20	-0.93
Québec solidaire	Adam Veilleux	701	2.35	+0.01
Parti indépendantiste	Sébastien Hotte	102	0.34	–
Total valid votes		29,843	98.41	–
Total rejected ballots		481	1.59	–
Turnout		30,324	61.33	-14.02
Electors on the lists		49,441	–	–

2007 Quebec general election
Party	Candidate	Votes	%	±%
Action démocratique	Linda Lapointe	13,630	37.45	+18.07
Parti Québécois	Rachel Gagnon	10,513	28.89	-9.78
Liberal	Pierre Descoteaux	9,898	27.20	-12.34
Green	Robert Harenclak	1,503	4.13	–
Québec solidaire	Adam Veilleux	850	2.34	+1.09*
Total valid votes		36,394	99.15	–
Total rejected ballots		311	0.85	–
Turnout		36,705	75.35	+1.83
Electors on the lists		48,715	–	–

* Result compared to UFP

== See also ==
- List of Quebec provincial electoral districts
- Canadian provincial electoral districts
