= René Gauvreau =

Canadian politician

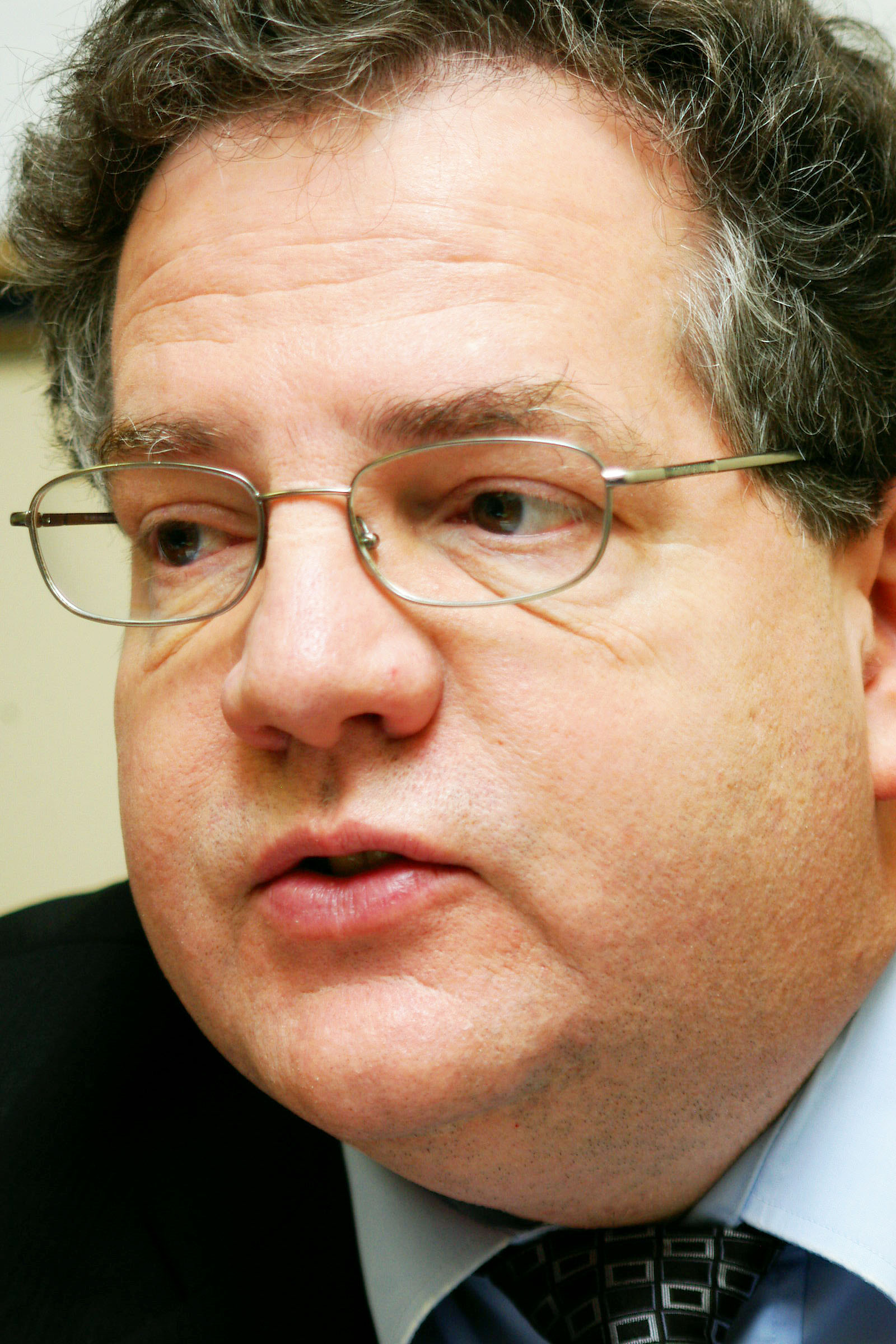

MNA for Groulx
- In office 2008–2012
- Preceded by: Linda Lapointe
- Succeeded by: Hélène Daneault

Personal details
- Born: 1954 (age 71–72) Montreal, Quebec, Canada
- Party: Parti Québécois → Independent → Parti Québécois

René Gauvreau (born 1954) is a Canadian politician in the province of Quebec, who was elected to represent the riding of Groulx in the National Assembly of Quebec in the 2008 provincial election. He is a member of the Parti Québécois, but sat as an independent for nine months until rejoining the PQ caucus in April 2012.

Gauvreau is a graduate of the Université de Montréal, where he obtained a law degree in 1987, and practiced law until his election in 2008. Gauvreau also worked as a member of several non-profit organizations and foundations mostly in the lower Laurentides region.

Gauvreau defeated the ADQ's Linda Lapointe in the Groulx riding in the 2008 elections as the PQ swept most of the Northern Montreal suburbs (north of Laval).

In 2026, Gauvreau announced he would run for National Assembly for Québec solidaire against Parti québécois leader Paul Saint-Pierre Plamondon in the Camille-Laurin riding.
