= Marie-Claude Sarrazin =

Quebec politician

Marie-Claude Sarrazin MNA

Member of the National Assembly for Groulx
- Incumbent
- Assumed office October 5, 2026
- Preceded by: Eric Girard

Personal details
- Party: Parti Québécois

Marie-Claude Sarrazin is a Quebec politician who was the elected to the National Assembly of Quebec for Groulx in the 2026 Quebec general election as a member of the Parti Québécois. She is a graduate of the University of Montreal's law degree and a member of the Quebec Bar since 2002. She is a lawyer by profession.

Sarrazin was appointed Minister of Justice in 2026.
