= Robert Kieffer =

Canadian politician

Member of the National Assembly of Quebec for Groulx
- In office September 12, 1994 – April 14, 2003
- Preceded by: Madeleine Bleau
- Succeeded by: Pierre Descoteaux

Personal details
- Born: January 3, 1946 (age 80) Montreal, Quebec
- Party: Parti Québécois
- Profession: Educator

Robert Kieffer (born January 3, 1946) is a Quebec politician who served as the member for Groulx in the Quebec National Assembly as a member of the Parti Québécois from 1994 until 2003.

== Biography ==
Kieffer was born in Montreal. He obtained a bachelor's degree in pedagogy from the Université de Montréal in 1967. At the Université du Québec à Montréal, he obtained a bachelor's degree in political science, specializing in international relations. He also obtained a master's degree in political science.

Kieffer was a professor of political science at Collège Lionel-Groulx from 1972 to 1994. He was a member of the executive and later the President of the Central Council of the Laurentides-Confederation of National Trade Unions.

== Political career ==
Kieffer served as secretary and then the president of his local PQ riding executive. He later become Chairman of the National Council of the provincial party. He sought the open seat of Groulx in the 1994 Quebec general election and won. He was re-elected without difficulty in 1998. He became the Parliamentary Secretary to Deputy Premier Bernard Landry following the election. When Landry became Premier, Kieffer followed him and became his Parliamentary Secretary.

Kieffer sought re-election in 2003 and lost by 303 votes to Liberal Pierre Descoteaux, in one of the tightest races that year.
