= Pierre Descoteaux =

Canadian lawyer and politician

Member of Parliament
- In office 2003–2007
- Preceded by: Robert Kieffer
- Succeeded by: Linda Lapointe

Personal details
- Born: February 16, 1952
- Died: April 9, 2018 (aged 66)
- Party: Quebec Liberal Party

Pierre Descoteaux (16 February 1952 – 9 April 2018) was a Canadian lawyer and politician from Quebec. From 2003 to 2007 he was Member of Parliament in the National Assembly of Quebec, representing the provincial electoral district of Groulx as a member of the Quebec Liberal Party.

== Life and career ==
Descoteaux earned a Bachelor of Science degree at McGill University, then earned his law degree at University of Montreal. He was admitted to the Bar of Quebec and practised law from 1986 to 2003. He taught law at the Bar school, then at Université du Québec à Montréal and the Université du Québec à Trois-Rivières .

He was elected to the National Assembly for the first time in the 2003 Quebec general election, with a narrow margin of 300 votes ahead of Robert Kieffer of Parti Québécois. He was defeated by Linda Lapointe of the Action Démocratique du Québec in the 2007 Quebec general election.

Descoteaux is a critic of Canadian federalism and has described himself as the most nationalist member of the Liberal caucus. He stated he voted "yes" on the 1995 Quebec referendum. In 2007, the media reported he had discussed joining Parti Québécois, but he ultimately remained with the Quebec Liberal Party.
