= Claude Surprenant =

Canadian politician

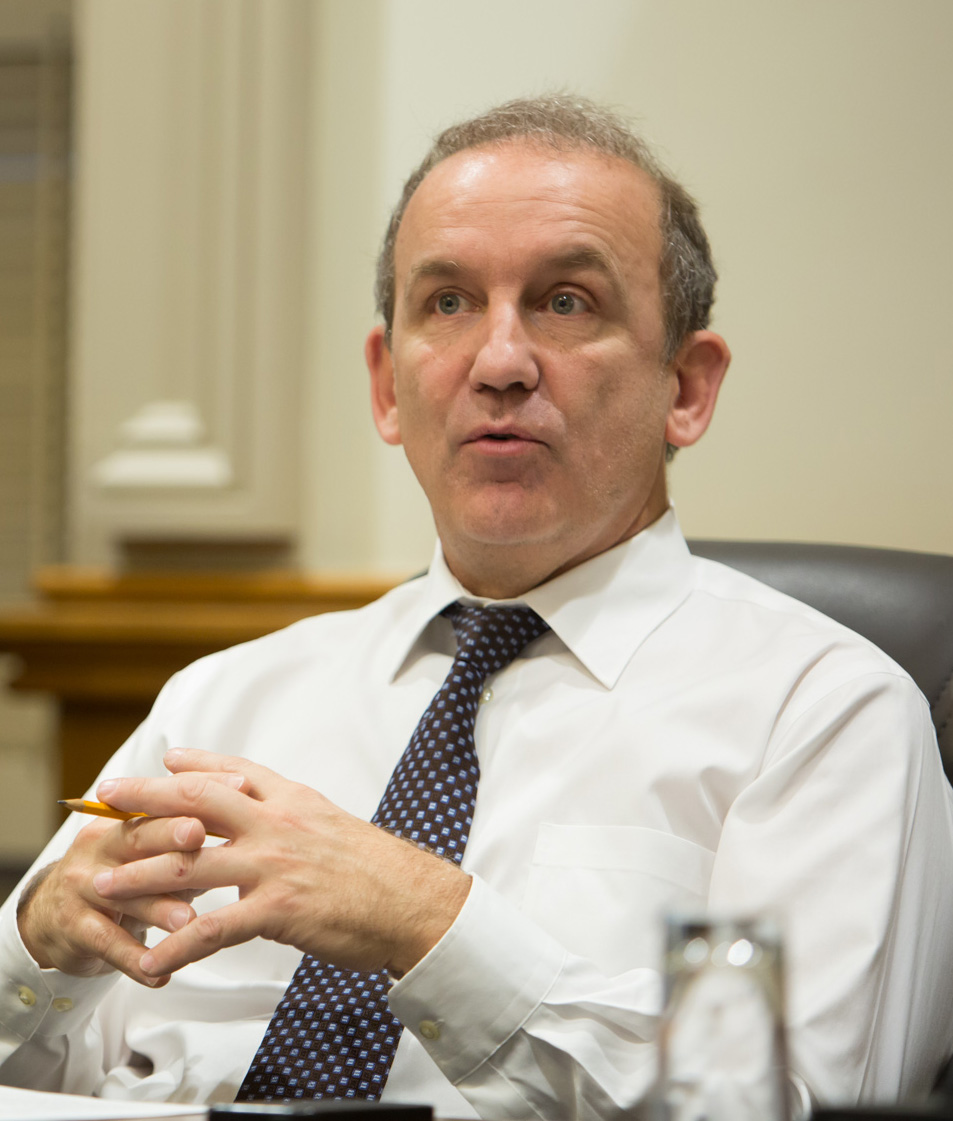

Member of the National Assembly of Quebec for Groulx
- In office April 7, 2014 – August 29, 2018
- Preceded by: Hélène Daneault
- Succeeded by: Eric Girard

Personal details
- Party: Independent (2017-); Coalition Avenir Québec (2014-2017)

Claude Surprenant is a Canadian politician, who was elected to the National Assembly of Quebec in the 2014 election. He represented the electoral district of Groulx as a member of the Coalition Avenir Québec until 2017, when he was removed from the CAQ caucus. He then sat as an independent member of the assembly until 2018, when he was defeated in the 2018 election.

== Career ==
Prior to being elected to the National Assembly, Suprenant was a member of the Investment Industry Association of Canada. In January 2012, he founded the company Ascendi, a financial management company, in Blainville. Suprenant worked for more than 25 years as vice-president and investment advisor. Suprenant is a graduate of Collège Laval.

=== Expense scandal ===
On January 24, 2017, Surprenant was ejected from the CAQ caucus after his former aide revealed information about his overcharging for his car allowance and for billing the National Assembly for a hotel room when the legislature was not sitting.

In a report by an accounting firm hired by the CAQ to look into expenses, it was found out Suprenant had given $9,400 in blank cheques to a riding assistant. It was also revealed he had given a $700 contract to his wife, an architect, to redesign his riding office.

== See also ==
- 41st Quebec Legislature
