= Eric Girard (Groulx MNA) =

Canadian politician

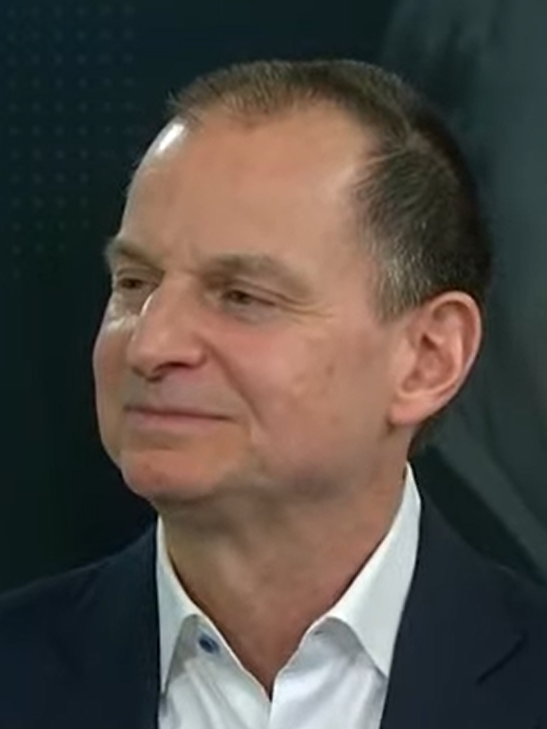
- Eric Girard in 2024

Minister of Finance
- In office October 18, 2018 – October 21, 2026
- Premier: François Legault; Christine Fréchette
- Preceded by: Carlos Leitão
- Succeeded by: Nicolas Marceau

Member of the National Assembly of Quebec for Groulx
- In office October 1, 2018 – October 5, 2026
- Preceded by: Claude Surprenant
- Succeeded by: Marie-Claude Sarrazin

Minister responsible for Relations with English-Speaking Quebecers
- In office October 20, 2022 – October 21, 2026
- Preceded by: François Legault
- Succeeded by: Marie-Claude Sarrazin

Minister of Economy and Innovation
- In office June 2, 2021 – September 1, 2021
- Preceded by: Pierre Fitzgibbon
- Succeeded by: Pierre Fitzgibbon

Personal details
- Born: October 9, 1966 (age 60) Sept-Îles, Quebec, Canada
- Party: Coalition Avenir Québec (provincial); Conservative (federal)
- Occupation: Banker

Eric Girard is a Canadian politician who was first elected to the National Assembly of Quebec in the 2018 provincial election. He represented the electoral district of Groulx as a member of the Coalition Avenir Québec and as served as the Minister of Finance from 2018 to 2026.

He worked as a senior manager with the National Bank of Canada for over 20 years.

Girard was recruited as a star candidate to run for the Conservative Party of Canada in the Montreal riding of Lac-Saint-Louis for the 2015 federal election. He finished a distant second to Liberal incumbent Francis Scarpaleggia.

In 2018, he was elected as the Coalition Avenir Québec MNA in the suburban Montreal riding of Groulx. He was re-elected in 2022.

== Electoral record ==
=== Federal ===
Lac-Saint-Louis

2015 Canadian federal election
Party	Candidate	Votes	%	±%	Expenditures
Liberal	Francis Scarpaleggia	39,965	64.14	+30.03	$119,096.00
Conservative	Eric Girard	10,857	17.42	-11.02	$74,550.48
New Democratic	Ryan Young	7,997	12.83	-17.23	$30,673.16
Green	Bradford Dean	1,812	2.91	-1.36	–
Bloc Québécois	Gabriel Bernier	1,681	2.7	-0.42	$4,317.92
Total valid votes/expense limit		62,312	100.0		$224,522.81
Total rejected ballots		321	0.51	-0.02	
Turnout		62,633	73.06	+6.93	
Eligible voters		85,727			
Liberal hold		Swing		+23.63	
Source: Elections Canada

=== Provincial ===
2022 Quebec general election: Groulx
Party	Candidate	Votes	%	±%
Coalition Avenir Québec	Eric Girard	17,431	47.75%	+7.14%
Québec solidaire	Marie-Noëlle Aubertin	5,919	16.21%	-1.02%
Parti Québécois	Jeanne Craig-Larouche	5,588	15.31%	-0.49%
Liberal	Audrey Medaino-Tardif	4,024	11.02%	-9.24%
Conservative	Valerie Messore	3,177	8.70%	+7.69%
Green	Victoria Shahsavar-Arshad	368	1.01%	-1.20%
Total valid votes		36,507	–	
Total rejected ballots			–	
Turnout				
Electors on the lists			–	–

2018 Quebec general election: Groulx
Party	Candidate	Votes	%	±%
Coalition Avenir Québec	Eric Girard	14,771	40.61	+9.76
Liberal	Sabrina Chartrand	7,369	20.26	-9.98
Québec solidaire	Fabien Torres	6,268	17.23	+10.44
Parti Québécois	Jean-Philippe Meloche	5,745	15.8	-14.2
Independent	Claude Surprenant	812	2.23	
Green	Robin Dick	802	2.21	
Conservative	Vincent Aubé	368	1.01	
Citoyens au pouvoir	Chantal Lavoie	235	0.65	
Total valid votes		36,370	98.37	
Total rejected ballots		604	1.63	
Turnout		36,974	70.25	
Eligible voters		52,633		
Coalition Avenir Québec hold		Swing		+9.87
Source(s) "Rapport des résultats officiels du scrutin". Élections Québec.
