= Hélène Daneault =

Canadian politician

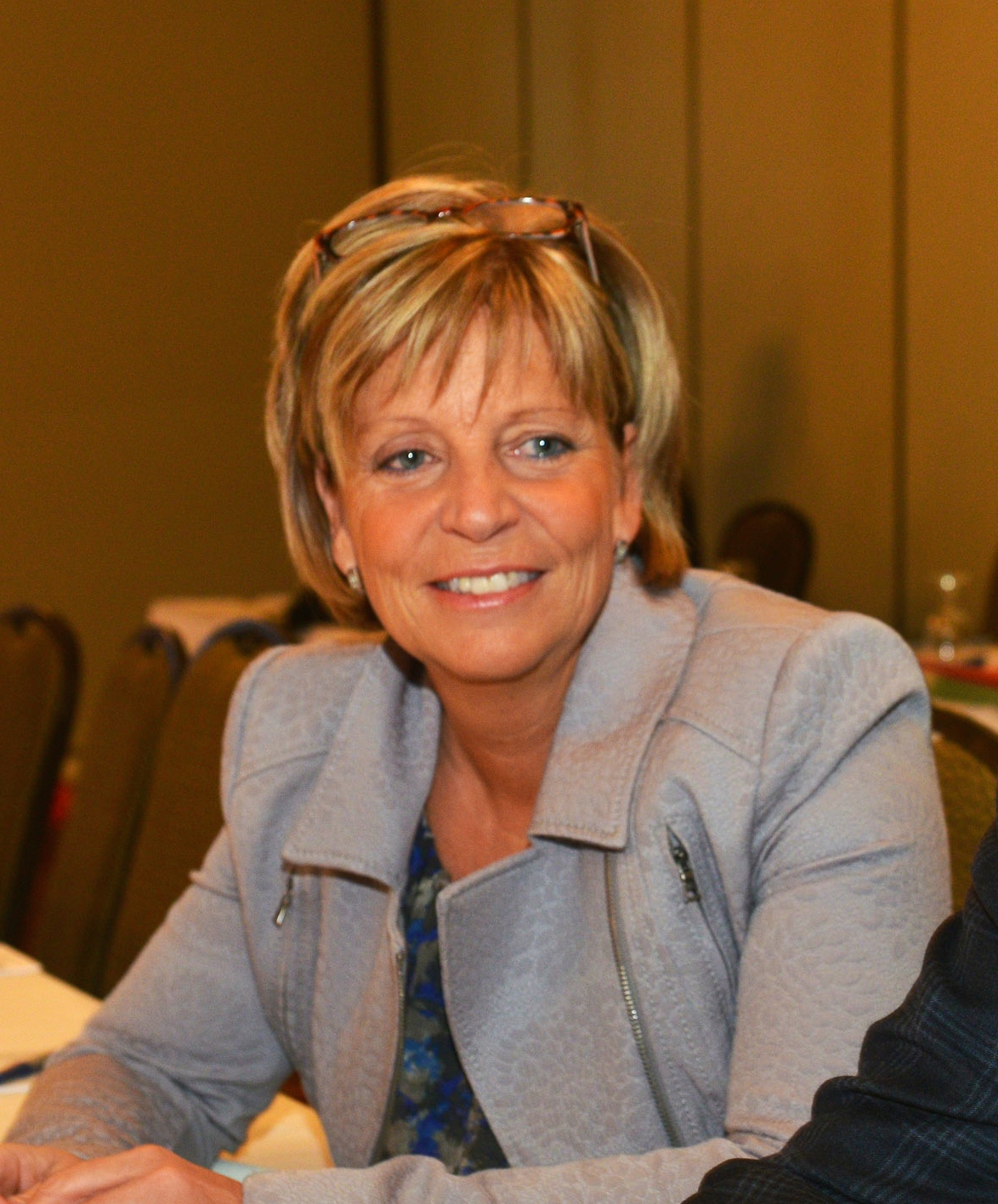

MNA for Groulx
- In office 2012–2014
- Preceded by: René Gauvreau
- Succeeded by: Claude Surprenant

Personal details
- Born: 29 May 1961 (age 65) Salaberry-de-Valleyfield, Quebec
- Party: Coalition Avenir Québec
- Profession: General practitioner

Hélène Daneault (born 29 May 1961) is a Canadian politician. She was a Coalition Avenir Québec member of the National Assembly of Quebec for the riding of Groulx from 2012 to 2014, first elected in the 2012 election.

Prior to her election to the legislature, she served as mayor of Rosemère.
