= 34th Quebec Legislature =

The 34th National Assembly of Quebec was the provincial legislature in Quebec, Canada that was elected in the 1989 Quebec general election and sat from November 28, 1989, to March 18, 1992; from March 19, 1992, to March 10, 1994; and from March 17, 1994, to June 14, 1994. The Quebec Liberal Party government was led by Robert Bourassa throughout most of the mandate except in the final months of the government prior to the 1994 elections, when Daniel Johnson Jr. succeeded Bourassa as Premier of Quebec.

== Seats per political party ==
Affiliation	Members	
Affiliation	After the 1989 elections	At dissolution
Liberal	92	77
Parti Québécois	29	33
Equality	4	1
Action démocratique	–	1
Total members	125	116
Vacant	–	9
Government majority	59	38

== Member list ==
This was the list of members of the National Assembly of Quebec that were elected in the 1989 election:

Name	Party	Riding	First elected / previously elected	No. of terms
Raymond Savoie	Libéral	Abitibi-Est	1985	2nd term
François Gendron	Parti Québécois	Abitibi-Ouest	1976	4th term
Yvan Bordeleau	Libéral	Acadie	1989	1st term
René Serge Larouche	Libéral	Anjou	1988	2nd term
René Serge Larouche	Independent	Anjou	1988	2nd term
Pierre Bélanger (1992)	Parti Québécois	Anjou	1992	1st term
Claude Ryan	Libéral	Argenteuil	1979	4th term
Jacques Baril	Parti Québécois	Arthabaska	1976, 1989	3rd term*
Jean Audet	Libéral	Beauce-Nord	1985	2nd term
Robert Dutil	Libéral	Beauce-Sud	1985	2nd term
André Chenail	Libéral	Beauharnois-Huntingdon	1989	1st term
Louise Bégin	Libéral	Bellechasse	1985	2nd term
Albert Houde	Libéral	Berthier	1981	3rd term
François Beaulne	Parti Québécois	Bertrand	1989	1st term
Gérard D. Levesque	Libéral	Bonaventure	1956	10th term
Marcel Landry (1994)	Parti Québécois	Bonaventure	1994	1st term
Louise Robic	Libéral	Bourassa	1985	2nd term
Huguette Boucher-Bacon	Libéral	Bourget	1989	1st term
Pierre Paradis	Libéral	Brome-Missisquoi	1980	4th term
Lucienne Robillard	Libéral	Chambly	1989	1st term
Pierre A. Brouillette	Libéral	Champlain	1985	2nd term
John J. Kehoe	Libéral	Chapleau	1981	3rd term
Marc-Yvan Côté	Libéral	Charlesbourg	1973, (Note: Matane) 1983	4th term*
Daniel Bradet	Libéral	Charlevoix	1985	2nd term
Pierrette Cardinal	Libéral	Châteauguay	1985	2nd term
Rémy Poulin	Libéral	Chauveau	1985	2nd term
Jeanne L. Blackburn	Parti Québécois	Chicoutimi	1985	2nd term
Lise Bacon	Libéral	Chomedey	1973, (Note: Bourassa) 1981	4th term*
André Vallerand	Libéral	Crémazie	1985	2nd term
Robert Libman	Equality	D'Arcy-McGee	1989	1st term
Robert Libman	Independent	D'Arcy-McGee	1989	1st term
Jean-Guy Bergeron	Libéral	Deux-Montagnes	1989	1st term
Violette Trépanier	Libéral	Dorion	1985	2nd term
Jean-Guy St-Roch	Libéral	Drummond	1985	2nd term
Jean-Guy St-Roch	Independent	Drummond	1985	2nd term
Gérard R. Morin	Parti Québécois	Dubuc	1989	1st term
Denis Perron	Parti Québécois	Duplessis	1976	4th term
Jean A. Joly	Libéral	Fabre	1985	2nd term
Roger Lefebvre	Libéral	Frontenac	1985	2nd term
André Beaudin	Libéral	Gaspé	1985	2nd term
Réjean Lafrenière	Libéral	Gatineau	1989	1st term
André Boisclair	Parti Québécois	Gouin	1989	1st term
Madeleine Bleau	Libéral	Groulx	1985	2nd term
Louise Harel	Parti Québécois	Hochelaga-Maisonneuve	1981	3rd term
Robert Lesage	Libéral	Hull	1989	2nd term
Yvon Lafrance	Libéral	Iberville	1989	1st term
Yvon Lafrance	Independent	Iberville	1989	1st term
Yvon Lafrance	ADQ	Iberville	1989	1st term
Georges Farrah	Libéral	Îles-de-la-Madeleine	1985	2nd term
Neil Cameron	Equality	Jacques-Cartier	1989	1st term
Michel Bissonnet	Libéral	Jeanne-Mance	1981	3rd term
Gil Rémillard	Libéral	Jean-Talon	1985	2nd term
Carmen Juneau	Parti Québécois	Johnson	1981	3rd term
Guy Chevrette	Parti Québécois	Joliette	1976	4th term
Francis Dufour	Parti Québécois	Jonquière	1985	2nd term
France Dionne	Libéral	Kamouraska-Témiscouata	1985	2nd term
Jacques Léonard	Parti Québécois	Labelle	1976, 1989	3rd term*
Jacques Brassard	Parti Québécois	Lac-Saint-Jean	1976	4th term
Jean-Claude Gobé	Libéral	LaFontaine	1985	2nd term
Lawrence Cannon	Libéral	La Peltrie	1985	2nd term
Jean-Pierre Saintonge	Libéral	La Pinière	1981	3rd term
André Bourbeau	Libéral	Laporte	1981	3rd term
Denis Lazure	Parti Québécois	La Prairie	1976, (Note: Chambly) 1989	3rd term*
Jacques Parizeau	Parti Québécois	L'Assomption	1976, 1989	3rd term*
Christos Sirros	Libéral	Laurier	1981	3rd term
Guy Bélanger	Libéral	Laval-des-Rapides	1985	2nd term
Serge Ménard (1993)	Parti Québécois	Laval-des-Rapides	1993	1st term
Jean-Pierre Jolivet	Parti Québécois	Laviolette	1976	4th term
Denise Carrier-Perreault	Parti Québécois	Les Chutes-de-la-Chaudière	1989	1st term
Jean Garon	Parti Québécois	Lévis	1976	4th term
Michel Després	Libéral	Limoilou	1985	2nd term
Lewis Camden	Libéral	Lotbinière	1985	2nd term
Réjean Doyon	Libéral	Louis-Hébert	1982	3rd term
Liza Frulla	Libéral	Marguerite-Bourgeoys	1989	1st term
Cécile Vermette	Parti Québécois	Marie-Victorin	1985	2nd term
Claude Dauphin	Libéral	Marquette	1981	3rd term
Yvon Picotte	Libéral	Maskinongé	1973	5th term
Yves Blais	Parti Québécois	Masson	1981	3rd term
Claire-Hélène Hovington	Libéral	Matane	1985	2nd term
Henri Paradis	Libéral	Matapédia	1985	2nd term
Madeleine Bélanger	Libéral	Mégantic-Compton	1983	3rd term
Gérald Godin	Parti Québécois	Mercier	1976	4th term
Jean-Pierre Belisle	Libéral	Mille-Îles	1985	2nd term
Réal Gauvin	Libéral	Montmagny-L'Islet	1985	2nd term
Yves Séguin	Libéral	Montmorency	1985	2nd term
Jean Filion (1991)	Parti Québécois	Montmorency	1991	1st term
John Ciaccia	Libéral	Mont-Royal	1973	5th term
Russell Williams	Libéral	Nelligan	1989	1st term
Maurice Richard	Libéral	Nicolet-Yamaska	1985	2nd term
Gordon Atkinson	Equality	Notre-Dame-de-Grâce	1989	1st term
Gordon Atkinson	Independent	Notre-Dame-de-Grâce	1989	1st term
Robert Benoit	Libéral	Orford	1989	1st term
Gérald Tremblay	Libéral	Outremont	1989	1st term
Norman MacMillan	Libéral	Papineau	1989	2nd term
Michel Bourdon	Parti Québécois	Pointe-aux-Trembles	1989	1st term
Robert Middlemiss	Libéral	Pontiac	1981	3rd term
Michel Pagé	Libéral	Portneuf	1973	5th term
Roger Bertrand (1993)	Parti Québécois	Portneuf	1993	1st term
Paul-André Forget	Libéral	Prévost	1985	2nd term
Albert Khelfa	Libéral	Richelieu	1985	2nd term
Yvon Vallières	Libéral	Richmond	1973, 1981	4th term*
Michel Tremblay	Libéral	Rimouski	1985	2nd term
Albert Côté	Libéral	Rivière-du-Loup	1985	2nd term
Sam Elkas	Libéral	Robert-Baldwin	1989	1st term
Gaston Blackburn	Libéral	Roberval	1988	2nd term
Guy Rivard	Libéral	Rosemont	1985	2nd term
Robert Thérien	Libéral	Rousseau	1985	2nd term
Rémy Trudel	Parti Québécois	Rouyn-Noranda–Témiscamingue	1989	1st term
Ghislain Maltais	Libéral	Saguenay	1983	3rd term
Normand Cherry	Libéral	Sainte-Anne	1989	1st term
Monique Gagnon-Tremblay	Libéral	Saint-François	1985	2nd term
Nicole Loiselle	Libéral	Saint-Henri	1989	1st term
Charles Messier	Libéral	Saint-Hyacinthe	1985	2nd term
Michel Charbonneau	Libéral	Saint-Jean	1989	1st term
Robert Bourassa	Libéral	Saint-Laurent	1966, (Note: Mercier) 1985, (Note: Bertrand) 1986	6th term*
Jacques Chagnon	Libéral	Saint-Louis	1985	2nd term
André Boulerice	Parti Québécois	Sainte-Marie–Saint-Jacques	1985	2nd term
Yvon Lemire	Libéral	Saint-Maurice	1985	2nd term
Serge Marcil	Libéral	Salaberry-Soulanges	1985	2nd term
Marcel Parent	Libéral	Sauvé	1984	3rd term
Roger Paré	Parti Québécois	Shefford	1981	3rd term
Bernard Brodeur (1994)	Libéral	Shefford	1994	1st term
André J. Hamel	Libéral	Sherbrooke	1985	2nd term
Pauline Marois	Parti Québécois	Taillon	1981, (Note: La Peltrie) 1989	2nd term*
Jean Leclerc	Libéral	Taschereau	1985	2nd term
Jocelyne Caron	Parti Québécois	Terrebonne	1989	1st term
Paul Philibert	Libéral	Trois-Rivières	1985	3rd term
Christian Claveau	Parti Québécois	Ungava	1985	2nd term
Christiane Pelchat	Libéral	Vachon	1985	2nd term
Jean-Guy Lemieux	Libéral	Vanier	1985	2nd term
Daniel Johnson Jr.	Libéral	Vaudreuil	1981	3rd term
Luce Dupuis	Parti Québécois	Verchères	1989	1st term
Henri-François Gautrin	Libéral	Verdun	1989	1st term
William Cusano	Libéral	Viau	1981	3rd term
Cosmo Maciocia	Libéral	Viger	1981	3rd term
Benoît Fradet	Libéral	Vimont	1989	1st term
Richard Holden	Equality	Westmount	1989	1st term
Richard Holden	Independent	Westmount	1989	1st term
Richard Holden	Parti Québécois	Westmount	1989	1st term

== Other elected MNAs ==
Other MNAs were elected in by-elections in this mandate

- Jean Filion, Parti Québécois, Montmorency, August 12, 1991
- Pierre Bélanger, Parti Québécois, Anjou, January 20, 1992
- Roger Bertrand, Parti Québécois, Portneuf, July 5, 1993
- Serge Ménard, Parti Québécois, Laval-des-Rapides, December 13, 1993
- Marcel Landry, Parti Québécois, Bonaventure, February 21, 1994
- Bernard Brodeur, Quebec Liberal Party, Shefford, February 28, 1994

== Cabinet Ministers ==
=== Bourassa Cabinet (1989–1994) ===
- Prime Minister and Executive Council President: Robert Bourassa
- Deputy Premier: Lise Bacon
- Agriculture, Fisheries and Food: Michel Pagé (1989–1992), Yvon Picotte (1992–1994), Robert Middlemiss (Delegate) (1989–1990), Yvon Vallières (1992–1994)
  - Agriculture, Fisheries and Food and Regional Development (Delegate): Yvon Vallières (1990–1992)
- Labor: Yves Séguin (1988–1989), André Bourbeau (1990), Normand Cherry (1990–1994)
- Workforce, Revenue Security and Professional Formation: André Bourbeau
- President of the Treasury Board, Administration and Public Office: Daniel Johnson Jr.
- Provisioning and Services: Robert Dutil
- Cultural Affairs: Lucienne Robillard (1989–1990), Liza Frulla (1990–1993)
- Culture: Liza Frulla (1993–1994)
- Cultural Communities and Immigration: Monique Gagnon-Tremblay
- Cultural Communities (Delegate): Normand Cherry
- Francophonie: Guy Rivard (1989–1992)
- Health and Social Services: Marc-Yvan Côté, Christos Sirros (Delegate) (1989–1990)
- Status of Women : Violette Trépanier
- Education: Claude Ryan (1989–1990), Michel Pagé (1990–1992), Lucienne Robillard (1990–1993)
- Superior Education and Science: Claude Ryan (1989–1990), Lucienne Robillard (1990–1993)
  - Education and Science: Lucienne Robillard (1993–1994)
- Recreation, Hunting and Fishing: Gaston Blackburn
- Mines and Regional Development: Raymond Savoie (1989–1990)
- Indian Affairs: John Ciaccia (1989–1990), Christos Sirros (1990–1994)
- Transportation: Sam Elkas
- Transportation (Delegate): Yvon Vallières (1989–1990), Robert Middlemiss (1990–1994)
- Communications: Liza Frulla (1989–1990), Lawrence Cannon (1990–1994)
- Municipal Affairs: Yvon Picotte (1989–1990), Claude Ryan (1990–1994)
- Regional Affairs: Yvon Picotte (1992–1994)
- Environment: Pierre Paradis
- Energy and Resources: Lise Bacon
- Forests: Albert Côté
- Canadian Intergovernmental Affairs: Gil Rémillard
- International Affairs: John Ciaccia, Guy Rivard (Delegate) (1992–1994)
- Electoral reform: Marc-Yvan Côté
- Tourism: André Vallerand
- Justice: Gil Rémillard
- Public Safety: Sam Elkas (1989–1990), Claude Ryan (1990–1994)
- Finances: Gérard D. Levesque (1989–1993), Monique Gagnon-Tremblay (1993–1994)
- Finances: (Delegate): Louise Robic
- Revenue: Yves Séguin (1989–1990), Gérard D. Levesque (1990), Raymond Savoie (1990–1994)
- Industry, Commerce and Technology: Gérald Tremblay

=== Johnson Jr. Cabinet (1994) ===
- Prime Minister and Executive Council President: Daniel Johnson Jr.
- Vice-President of the Executive Council: Monique Gagnon-Tremblay
- Agriculture, Fisheries and Food: Yvon Picotte
- Revenue Security: Violette Trépanier
- Employment: Serge Marcil
- President of the Treasury Board, Administration and Public Office: Monique Gagnon-Tremblay
- Government Services: Jean Leclerc
- Culture and Communications: Liza Frulla
- International Affairs, Cultural Communities and Immigration: John Ciaccia
- Health and Social Services: Lucienne Robillard
- Status of Women and Family: Violette Trépanier
- Education: Jacques Chagnon
- Indian Affairs: Christos Sirros
- Transportation: Normand Cherry, Gaston Blackburn (Delegate)
- Municipal Affairs:Claude Ryan
- Regional Affairs: Yvon Picotte
- Environment and Wildlife: Pierre Paradis
- Natural Resources: Christos Sirros
- Electoral reform: Roger Lefebvre
- Justice: Roger Lefebvre
- Public Safety: Robert Middlemiss
- Finances: André Bourbeau
- Revenue: André Vallerand
- Industry, Commerce, Science and Technology: Gérald Tremblay, Georges Farrah (Delegate)

== New electoral districts ==
An electoral map reform was made in 1992 and the changes were in effect starting in the 1994 elections.

The following electoral districts were created:

- Bertrand (in the Laurentides region, unrelated to the previous Bertrand in the Montérégie region)
- Blainville
- Borduas
- Laurier-Dorion
- Marguerite-D'Youville
- Saint-Henri–Sainte-Anne
- Westmount–Saint-Louis

The following electoral districts disappeared:

- Bertrand (in the Montérégie region), unrelated to the new Bertrand (in the Laurentides region)
- Dorion
- Laurier
- Saint-Henri
- Saint-Louis
- Sainte-Anne
- Westmount
