= Vice President of the National Assembly of Quebec =

The Vice President of the National Assembly of Quebec (French; Le Vice-président de l'Assemblée nationale) is the deputy speaker of the National Assembly of Quebec, Canada, which is modeled after the Westminster parliamentary system. The President of the National Assembly is fourteenth in the Quebec order of precedence.

== Description ==
The position of Vice President was created in 1909, with a second Vice President being added in 1973 and a third in 1999. Currently, two Vice Presidents are elected from the ruling party (or coalition) and one from the opposition. They are elected by their colleagues at the beginning of a legislature, and serve until a successor is elected. The Vice President assists the President of the Assembly, and can replace the President in the case of their absence. The Vice Presidents generally preside over routine proceedings. They rarely take part in debate, although they can still cast votes. The current Vice Presidents of the Assembly are Liberals Francois Ouimet and Maryse Gaudreault and péquiste Francois Gendron.

== List of vice presidents of the National Assembly of Quebec ==
Dates are derived from the National Assembly's listing of Vice Presidents and their linked profiles.

=== One officeholder (1909–1973) ===
Vice President	Elected	Left office	Party
Cyrille-Fraser Delâge	10 March 1909	8 January 1912	Liberal
Joseph-Adolphe Tessier	18 January 1912	2 March 1915	Liberal
Antonin Galipeault	12 January 1915	22 May 1916	Liberal
Eugène Merrill Desaulniers	8 November 1916	20 November 1919	Liberal
Adrien Beaudry	11 December 1919	26 March 1921	Liberal
Gustave Lemieux	12 January 1922	21 December 1923	Liberal
Hector Laferté	21 December 1923	10 January 1928	Liberal
Télesphore-Damien Bouchard	24 January 1928	7 January 1930	Liberal
Irénée Vautrin	22 January 1930	9 May 1934	Liberal
Hector Authier	17 January 1935	13 March 1936	Liberal
Léon Casgrain	29 April 1936	10 July 1936	Liberal
Marc Trudel	14 October 1936	September 1939	Union Nationale
Valmore Bienvenue	6 March 1940	12 May 1942	Liberal
Cyrille Dumaine	12 May 1942	23 February 1943	Liberal
Charles Delagrave	4 March 1943	22 June 1944	Liberal
Maurice Tellier	13 February 1945	15 December 1955	Union Nationale
Daniel Johnson Sr.	15 December 1955	30 April 1958	Union Nationale
Germain Caron	4 December 1958	21 September 1960	Union Nationale
John Richard Hyde	21 September 1960	9 January 1962	Liberal
Jean-Jacques Bédard	30 January 1962	18 April 1966	Liberal
Gérard Lebel	6 December 1966	22 October 1968	Union Nationale
Raynald Fréchette	22 October 1968	24 February 1970	Union Nationale
Roland Théorêt	24 February 1970	10 June 1970	Union Nationale
Denis Hardy	10 June 1970	28 February 1973	Liberal

=== Two officeholders (1973–1999) ===
Vice President	Elected	Left office	Party
Harry Blank	2 March 1973	14 December 1976	Liberal
Robert Lamontagne	2 March 1973	14 December 1976	Liberal
Jean-Guy Cardinal	14 December 1976	16 March 1979	Parti Québécois
Louise Cuerrier	14 December 1976	19 May 1981	Parti Québécois
Claude Vaillancourt	17 May 1979	11 November 1980	Parti Québécois
Jean-Pierre Jolivet	11 November 1980	20 December 1984	Parti Québécois
Réal Rancourt	19 May 1981	16 December 1985	Parti Québécois
Raymond Brouillet	20 December 1984	16 December 1985	Parti Québécois
Jean-Pierre Saintonge	16 December 1985	28 November 1989	Liberal
Louise Bégin	16 December 1985	28 November 1989	Liberal
Lawrence Cannon	28 November 1989	5 October 1990	Liberal
Michel Bissonnet	28 November 1989	26 September 1994	Liberal
Roger Lefebvre	16 October 1990	11 January 1994	Liberal
Michel Tremblay	8 March 1994	29 November 1994	Liberal
Pierre Bélanger	29 November 1994	29 January 1996	Parti Québécois
Raymond Brouillet	29 November 1994	2 March 1999	Parti Québécois
Claude Pinard	12 March 1996	2 March 1999	Parti Québécois

=== Three officeholders (1999–present) ===
==== Vice presidents for the majority ====
Vice President	Elected	Left office	Party
Claude Pinard	2 March 1999	11 March 2002	Parti Québécois
Raymond Brouillet	2 March 1999	4 June 2003	Parti Québécois
François Beaulne	12 March 2002	3 June 2003	Parti Québécois
Christos Sirros	4 June 2003	17 June 2004	Liberal
Diane Leblanc	4 June 2003	8 May 2007	Liberal
William Cusano	19 October 2004	8 May 2007	Liberal
Jacques Chagnon	8 May 2007	5 April 2011	Liberal
Fatima Houda-Pepin	8 May 2007	30 October 2012	Liberal
François Ouimet	5 April 2011	30 October 2012	Liberal
Carole Poirier	30 October 2012	20 May 2014	Parti Québécois
Claude Cousineau	30 October 2012	20 May 2014	Parti Québécois
François Ouimet	20 May 2014	27 November 2018	Liberal
Maryse Gaudreault	20 May 2014	27 November 2018	Liberal
Marc Picard	27 November 2018	29 November 2022	Coalition Avenir Québec
Chantal Soucy	27 November 2018	present	Coalition Avenir Québec
Sylvain Lévesque	29 November 2022	present	Coalition Avenir Québec

==== Vice president for the opposition ====
Vice President	Elected	Left office	Party
Michel Bissonnet	2 March 1999	4 June 2003	Liberal
François Gendron	4 June 2003	8 May 2007	Parti Québécois
Marc Picard	8 May 2007	13 January 2009	ADQ
François Gendron	13 January 2009	19 September 2012	Parti Québécois
François Ouimet	30 October 2012	20 May 2014	Liberal
François Gendron	20 May 2014	27 November 2018	Parti Québécois
Maryse Gaudreault	27 November 2018	29 November 2022	Liberal
Frantz Benjamin	29 November 2022	present	Liberal
