= Luc Thériault =

Canadian politician

Luc Thériault MP

Member of Parliament for Montcalm
- Incumbent
- Assumed office October 19, 2015
- Preceded by: Manon Perreault

Member of the National Assembly of Québec for Masson
- In office April 14, 2003 – March 26, 2007
- Preceded by: Gilles Labbé
- Succeeded by: Ginette Grandmont

Personal details
- Born: January 31, 1960 (age 66) Montreal, Quebec
- Party: Bloc Québécois
- Other political affiliations: Québec debout (2018); Parti Québécois (provincial)
- Profession: Professor

Luc Thériault MP (born January 31, 1960) is a Canadian academic and politician. As a member of the Parti Québécois, he served as a Member of the National Assembly of Quebec from 2003 to 2007, representing the Masson electoral district. In 2015, he was elected to the Canadian House of Commons representing Montcalm, as a member of the Bloc Québécois. He served as the Bloc Québécois House Leader from 2015 until 2017, and was the party's representative on the Special Committee on Electoral Reform.

Thériault, along with six other Bloc MPs, resigned from the Bloc's caucus to sit as an independent MP on February 28, 2018, citing conflicts with the leadership style of Martine Ouellet. He rejoined the Bloc Québécois caucus on September 17, 2018.

Since 2021 he has served as the critic of health, medical aid in dying and drug licensing in the Bloc Québécois Shadow Cabinet. In 2022, Thériault sponsored the private member's bill An Act to amend the Department of Foreign Affairs, Trade and Development Act (supply management), Bill C-282.

== Life and career ==
Thériault was born in Montreal. He attended Université du Québec à Montréal, earning a bachelor's degree in philosophy in 1984 and a Masters in political philosophy in 1988. He later earned a DESS in bioethics at the Université de Montréal in 2002.

After obtaining his master's degree, he taught philosophy at Collège de Maisonneuve from 1985 to 2003. He also coached water polo from 1979 to 1988.

He served as a member of the Ethics Committee of the Maisonneuve-Rosemont Hospital and Jeanne-Le Ber nursing home from 2000 to 2003. He was a member of the Board of Directors of the Maisonneuve Cooperative School (Coopérative scolaire Maisonneuve) from 2001 to 2003.

He was bureau chief for Parti Québécois in Ville-Marie, Montreal from 1999 to 2003. He was elected in the 2003 Quebec general election, succeeding Gilles Labbé. He was defeated in the 2007 Quebec general election by Ginette Grandmont.

He was elected as the vice-chair of the Canadian House of Commons Standing Committee on Access to Information, Privacy and Ethics and the Canadian House of Commons Standing Committee on Health in the 45th Canadian Parliament.

== Electoral record ==
=== Federal ===
2025 Canadian federal election: Montcalm
Party	Candidate	Votes	%	±%	Expenditures
Bloc Québécois	Luc Thériault	27,268	46.60	−6.62	
Liberal	Fatima Badran	15,769	26.95	+6.97	
Conservative	Jean-Sébastien Lepage	13,589	23.22	+11.54	
New Democratic	Denis Perreault	1,893	3.23	−3.04	
Total valid votes/expense limit		58,519	97.84		
Total rejected ballots		1,291	2.16		
Turnout		59,810	64.10		
Eligible voters		93,303			
Bloc Québécois notional hold		Swing		−6.80	
Source: Elections Canada
Note: number of eligible voters does not include voting day registrations.

2021 Canadian federal election: Montcalm
Party	Candidate	Votes	%	±%	Expenditures
Bloc Québécois	Luc Thériault	27,378	53.2	-4.8	$28,966.29
Liberal	Javeria Qureshi	10,196	19.8	-0.6	$5,445.75
Conservative	Gisèle Desroches	6,011	11.7	+2.7	$6,098.27
New Democratic	Oulai B. Goué	3,218	6.3	-0.1	$287.44
People's	Bruno Beaudry	2,258	4.4	+3.4	$0.00
Green	Mathieu Goyette	1,317	2.6	-1.8	$0.00
Free	Robert Bellerose	1,074	2.1	N/A	$0.00
Total valid votes/expense limit		51,452	97.5	–	$120,692.56
Total rejected ballots		1,337	2.5		
Turnout		52,789	57.0		
Eligible voters		92,547			
Bloc Québécois hold		Swing		+2.1	
Source: Elections Canada

2019 Canadian federal election: Montcalm
Party	Candidate	Votes	%	±%	Expenditures
Bloc Québécois	Luc Thériault	31,791	58.01	+21.40	$43,460.97
Liberal	Isabel Sayegh	11,200	20.44	-6.88	$33,958.89
Conservative	Gisèle DesRoches	4,942	9.02	-0.59	none listed
New Democratic	Julian Bonello-Stauch	3,514	6.41	-17.04	$0.10
Green	Mathieu Goyette	2,416	4.41	+2.57	none listed
People's	Hugo Clenin	524	0.96	–	none listed
Indépendance du Québec	Marc Labelle	419	0.76	–	$0.00
Total valid votes/expense limit		54,806	100.0		
Total rejected ballots		1,311	1.48	-0.72	
Turnout		56,117	63.39	-1.53	
Eligible voters		88,525			
Bloc Québécois hold		Swing		+14.14	
Source: Elections Canada

2015 Canadian federal election: Montcalm
Party	Candidate	Votes	%	±%	Expenditures
Bloc Québécois	Luc Thériault	19,405	36.61	+5.17	$17,567.65
Liberal	Louis-Charles Thouin	14,484	27.32	+22.4	$70,923.39
New Democratic	Martin Leclerc	12,431	23.45	-28.45	$65,982.01
Conservative	Gisèle Desroches	5,093	9.61	+1.66	$6,282.61
Green	Yumi Yow Mei Ang	976	1.84	-1.95	–
Strength in Democracy	Manon Perreault	620	1.17	–51.80	$4,015.36
Total valid votes/expense limit		53,009	100.0		$220,941.63
Total rejected ballots		1,226	2.20	+0.41	
Turnout		54,235	64.92	+3.16	
Eligible voters		83,532			
Bloc Québécois notional gain from Strength in Democracy		Swing		+16.78	
Source: Elections Canada

=== Provincial ===
2007 Quebec general election
Party	Candidate	Votes	%	±%
Action démocratique	Ginette Grandmont	18,808	43.83	+21.66
Parti Québécois	Luc Thériault	15,414	35.92	-8.91
Liberal	Denise Cloutier	6,058	14.12	-18.88
Green	Jean Bonneau	1,569	3.66	–
Québec solidaire	Marco Legrand	1,059	2.47	–
Total valid votes		42,908	98.78	–
Total rejected ballots		529	1.22	–
Turnout		43,437	74.30	+3.44
Electors on the lists		58,459	–	–
Action démocratique gain from Parti Québécois		Swing		+15.29

2003 Quebec general election
Party	Candidate	Votes	%	±%
Parti Québécois	Luc Thériault	15,445	44.83	-19.20
Liberal	Richard Marcotte	11,371	33.00	+16.73
Action démocratique	Nathalie Filion	7,637	22.17	+4.22
Total valid votes		34,453	97.72	–
Total rejected ballots		803	2.28	–
Turnout		35,256	70.86	+10.71
Electors on the lists		49,756	–	–
Parti Québécois hold		Swing		-17.97

=== Municipal ===
2013 Mascouche mayoral election
Party		Mayoral candidate	Vote	%
	Vision démocratique de Mascouche - Équipe Guillaume Tremblay	Guillaume Tremblay	9,438	53.70
	Équipe Luc Thériault	Luc Thériault	6,296	35.82
	Independent	Pierre Nevraumont	1,842	10.48
Total			17,576	100.00
