= Gilles Labbé =

Canadian politician

Member of the National Assembly of Quebec for Masson
- In office December 14, 1998 – April 14, 2003
- Preceded by: Yves Blais
- Succeeded by: Luc Thériault

Personal details
- Born: March 9, 1948 (age 78) Montreal, Quebec
- Party: Parti Québécois
- Profession: Aid officer

Gilles Labbé (born March 9, 1948) is a Quebec politician. He served as the member for Masson as a member of the Parti Québécois from 1998 until 2003.

== Biography ==
Labbé was a team leader and socio-economic aid officer for the City of Montreal for almost 30 years.

== Political career ==
Labbé served as a Le Gardeur municipal councillor from 1982 until 1994 and then became the mayor from 1994 until his election. He also served concurrently as Prefect of L'Assomption Regional County Municipality from 1996 until 1998.

Labbé was named as a replacement candidate for Yves Blais, who died of a heart attack eight days before the 1998 election, for the district of Masson, and won in an election that was postponed until 12 December of that year. He served as a backbench supporter in the Bouchard government and the Landry government, serving as Parliamentary assistant to the Minister of State for Administration and the Public Service and President of the Treasury board in the latter.

He did not seek re-election in 2003.

== Electoral record ==
=== Provincial ===
1998 Quebec general election: Masson
Party	Candidate	Votes	%	±%
Parti Québécois	Gilles Labbé	17,529	64.03	-0.16
Action démocratique	Éric Parent	4,914	17.95	+4.84
Liberal	Marc-André Plante	4,453	16.27	-4.62
Bloc Pot	Philippe Humphreys	295	1.08	–
Socialist Democracy	Marco Legrand	143	0.52	–
Independent	George Butcher	42	0.15	–
Total valid votes		27,376	99.06	–
Total rejected ballots		261	0.94	–
Turnout		27,637	60.15	-22.56
Electors on the lists		45,949	–	–
Note: The 1998 election was postponed to December 14, 1998 in Masson due to the death of a candidate
Parti Québécois hold		Swing		+2.39
