= Masson (electoral district) =

Provincial electoral district in Quebec, Canada

Quebec electoral district

Provincial electoral district
- Legislature: National Assembly of Quebec
MNA
Stéphane Handfield
Parti Québécois
- District created: 1988
- First contested: 1989
- Last contested: 2026

Demographics
- Population (2011): 65,935
- Electors (2012): 48,934
- Area (km²): 147.2
- Pop. density (per km²): 447.9
- Census division: Les Moulins (part)
- Census subdivision(s): Mascouche, Terrebonne (part)

Masson is a provincial electoral district in Quebec, Canada, that elects members to the National Assembly. It includes portions of the city of Mascouche and the La Plaine sector of the city of Terrebonne.

It was created for the 1989 election from parts of the Terrebonne and L'Assomption electoral districts.

In the change from the 2001 to the 2011 electoral map, it lost Charlemagne and the part of Repentigny it formerly had to the L'Assomption electoral district.

In the change from the 2011 to the 2017 electoral map, the riding will lose the La Plaine district of Terrebonne to the new riding of Les Plaines and will gain the part of the Lacheneaie District of Terrebonne east of Montée Dumais from the riding of L'Assomption.

== Members of the National Assembly ==
Legislature	Years	Member	Party
Riding created from Terrebonne and L'Assomption
34th	1989–1994	Yves Blais	Parti Québécois
35th	1994–1998	Yves Blais	Parti Québécois
36th	1998–2003	Gilles Labbé	Parti Québécois
37th	2003–2007	Luc Thériault	Parti Québécois
38th	2007–2008	Ginette Grandmont	Action démocratique
39th	2008–2012	Guillaume Tremblay	Parti Québécois
40th	2012–2014	Diane Hamelin	Parti Québécois
41st	2014–2018	Mathieu Lemay	Coalition Avenir Québec
42nd	2018–2022	Mathieu Lemay	Coalition Avenir Québec
43rd	2022–2026	Mathieu Lemay	Coalition Avenir Québec
44th	2026–Present	Stéphane Handfield	Parti Québécois

== Election results ==
2026 Quebec general election
** Preliminary results — Not yet official **
Party	Candidate	Votes	%	±%
Parti Québécois	Stéphane Handfield	15,609	40.27	
Liberal	Martin Gaulin	7,137	18.41	
Conservative	Benoit Lanoue	6,694	17.27	
Coalition Avenir Québec	Anik Girard	6,034	15.57	
Québec solidaire	Stéphane Durupt	3,283	8.47	
Total valid votes				
Total rejected ballots				
Turnout			71.34	
Electors on the lists			–	–
Source: Élections Québec

2022 Quebec general election
Party	Candidate	Votes	%	±%
Coalition Avenir Québec	Mathieu Lemay	18,195	51.60	–1.45
Parti Québécois	Stéphane Handfield	6,432	18.24	–1.47
Québec solidaire	Émile Bellerose-Simard	4,610	13.07	–0.37
Conservative	François Truchon	2,972	8.43	+7.64
Liberal	Gabriel Bourret	2,723	7.72	–3.17
Green	Marc-André Bélisle	332	0.94	–1.17
Total valid votes		35,264	98.73	+0.39
Total rejected ballots		453	1.27	–0.39
Turnout		35,717	71.16	–1.70
Electors on the lists		50,194	–	–

2018 Quebec general election
Party	Candidate	Votes	%	±%
Coalition Avenir Québec	Mathieu Lemay	17,565	53.05	+14.7
Parti Québécois	Diane Hamelin	6,527	19.71	-17.09
Québec solidaire	Stephane Durupt	4,451	13.44	+7.16
Liberal	Maryanne Beauchamp	3,606	10.89	-6.12
Green	Véronique Dubois	699	2.11	
Conservative	David Morin	263	0.79	+0.07
Total valid votes		33,111	98.34	
Total rejected ballots		560	1.66	
Turnout		33,671	72.86	
Eligible voters		46,214		
Coalition Avenir Québec hold		Swing		+15.895
Source(s) "Rapport des résultats officiels du scrutin". Élections Québec.

2014 Quebec general election
Party	Candidate	Votes	%	±%
Coalition Avenir Québec	Mathieu Lemay	13,235	38.35	+2.21
Parti Québécois	Diane Hamelin	12,701	36.80	-9.15
Liberal	Wenet Féné	5,869	17.01	+5.96
Québec solidaire	Joëlle St-Pierre	2,168	6.28	+3.11
Option nationale	Pierre-Alexandre Bugeaud	289	0.84	-1.06
Conservative	Éric Giroux	249	0.72	–
Total valid votes		34,511	97.66	–
Total rejected ballots		827	2.34	+0.94
Turnout		35,338	69.51	-8.66
Electors on the lists		50,840	–	–
Coalition Avenir Québec gain from Parti Québécois		Swing		+5.68

2012 Quebec general election
Party	Candidate	Votes	%	±%
Parti Québécois	Diane Hamelin	17,377	45.96	-5.31
Coalition Avenir Québec	Christian Gauthier	13,664	36.14	+14.22
Liberal	Suzanne Rathé	4,178	11.05	-10.80
Québec solidaire	Jacinthe Sabourin	1,199	3.17	
Option nationale	Samuel Bergeron	716	1.89	–
Green	Michel Paulette	545	1.44	+1.21
Coalition pour la constituante	Adam Stohl	134	0.35	–
Total valid votes		37,813	98.60	–
Total rejected ballots		536	1.40	–
Turnout		38,349	78.17	
Electors on the lists		49,058	–	–
Parti Québécois hold		Swing		-9.77

^ Change is from redistributed results. CAQ change is from ADQ.

2008 Quebec general election
Party	Candidate	Votes	%	±%
Parti Québécois	Guillaume Tremblay	18,037	50.68	+14.76
Liberal	David Grégoire	8,174	22.97	+8.85
Action démocratique	Ginette Grandmont	7,466	20.98	−22.85
Green	Michel Paulette	948	2.66	−1.00
Québec solidaire	Gabriel Poirier	716	2.01	−0.46
Parti indépendantiste	Bertrand Lefebvre	251	0.71	–
Total valid votes		35,592	97.89	–
Total rejected ballots		767	2.11	–
Turnout		36,359	57.10	−17.20
Electors on the lists		63,675	–	–

2007 Quebec general election
Party	Candidate	Votes	%	±%
Action démocratique	Ginette Grandmont	18,808	43.83	+21.66
Parti Québécois	Luc Thériault	15,414	35.92	-8.91
Liberal	Denise Cloutier	6,058	14.12	-18.88
Green	Jean Bonneau	1,569	3.66	–
Québec solidaire	Marco Legrand	1,059	2.47	–
Total valid votes		42,908	98.78	–
Total rejected ballots		529	1.22	–
Turnout		43,437	74.30	+3.44
Electors on the lists		58,459	–	–

2003 Quebec general election
Party	Candidate	Votes	%	±%
Parti Québécois	Luc Thériault	15,445	44.83	-19.20
Liberal	Richard Marcotte	11,371	33.00	+16.73
Action démocratique	Nathalie Filion	7,637	22.17	+4.22
Total valid votes		34,453	97.72	–
Total rejected ballots		803	2.28	–
Turnout		35,256	70.86	+10.71
Electors on the lists		49,756	–	–

1998 Quebec general election
Party	Candidate	Votes	%	±%
Parti Québécois	Gilles Labbé	17,529	64.03	-0.16
Action démocratique	Éric Parent	4,914	17.95	+4.84
Liberal	Marc-André Plante	4,453	16.27	-4.62
Bloc Pot	Philippe Humphreys	295	1.08	–
Socialist Democracy	Marco Legrand	143	0.52	–
Independent	George Butcher	42	0.15	–
Total valid votes		27,376	99.06	–
Total rejected ballots		261	0.94	–
Turnout		27,637	60.15	-22.56
Electors on the lists		45,949	–	–
Note: The 1998 election was postponed to December 14, 1998 in Masson due to the death of a candidate

1995 Quebec referendum
Side	Votes	%
Oui	28,636	71.02
Non	11,683	28.98

1994 Quebec general election
Party	Candidate	Votes	%	±%
Parti Québécois	Yves Blais	21,481	64.19	+4.77
Liberal	Alain Leclerc	6,991	20.89	−14.40
Action démocratique	André Beaulieu	4,388	13.11	–
Independent	Janine Larose	351	1.05	–
Natural Law	Andria Murray	255	0.76	
Total valid votes		33,466	100.00	
Rejected and declined votes		773		
Turnout		34,239	82.71	+8.92
Electors on the lists		41,397		

1992 Charlottetown Accord referendum
Side	Votes	%
Non	33,818	75.58
Oui	10,924	24.42

1989 Quebec general election
Party	Candidate	Votes	%
Parti Québécois	Yves Blais	19,615	59.42
Liberal	Micheline Croteau-René	11,648	35.29
Green	Janine Larose	1,135	3.44
New Democratic	Richard Morin	611	1.85
Total valid votes		33,009	97.45
Total rejected ballots		864	2.55
Turnout		33,873	73.79
Electors on the lists		45,904	–

== See also ==
- List of Quebec provincial electoral districts
- Canadian provincial electoral districts
