= 2025 Terrebonne provincial by-election =

Provincial by-election in Quebec, Canada

- March 17, 2025

Riding of Terrebonne
- Turnout: 37.28% (▼33.91)
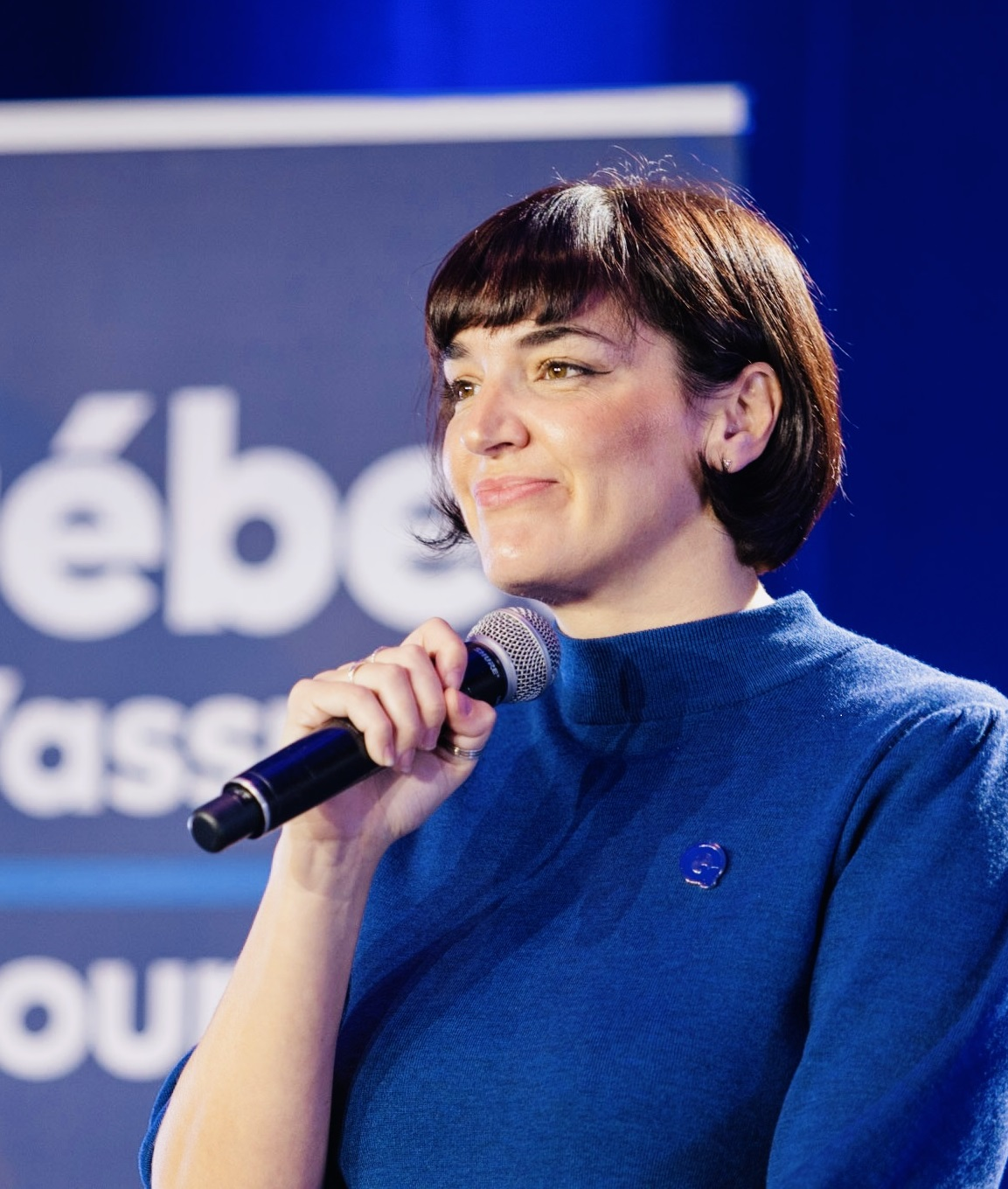
| | First party | Second party | Third party |
|---|---|---|---|
| | | CAQ | PLQ |
| Candidate | Catherine Gentilcore | Alex Gagné | Virginie Bouchard |
| Party | Parti Québécois | Coalition Avenir Québec | Liberal |
| Popular vote | 11,935 | 6,513 | 1,845 |
| Percentage | 52.74% | 28.78% | 8.15% |
| Swing | ▲33.86 | ▼20.66 | ▼2.02 |
MNA before election
Pierre Fitzgibbon
Coalition Avenir Québec
Elected MNA
Catherine Gentilcore
Parti Québécois

The 2025 Terrebonne provincial by-election was held on March 17, 2025. It was triggered after the resignation of Pierre Fitzgibbon from the National Assembly of Quebec.

== Background ==
=== Constituency ===
The main settlement in the seat is the city of Terrebonne, a suburb on the North Shore of Montreal.

Once a stronghold of the Parti Québécois (PQ), Terrebonne was first won by Pierre Fitzgibbon for the Coalition Avenir Québec (CAQ) in the 2018 Quebec general election.

=== Representation ===
The by-election is considered a test of leadership for Premier François Legault. A major issue is the United States trade war with Canada and Mexico.

Advance voting was open from March 9 to March 10.

== Candidates ==
There are nine candidates:

- Benoit Beauchamp (Climat Québec)
- Eric Bernier (Union Nationale)
- Ange Claude Bigilimana (Conservative Party of Quebec)
- Virginie Bouchard (Quebec Liberal Party)
- Alex Gagné (Coalition avenir Québec)
- Catherine Gentilcore (Parti Québécois)
- Shawn Lalande McLean (Parti accès propriété et équité)
- Nadia Poirier (Québec solidaire)
- Jean-Louis Thémis (Parti culinaire du Québec)

== Results ==
Quebec provincial by-election, March 17, 2025: Terrebonne Resignation of Pierre Fitzgibbon
| Party | Candidate | Votes | % | ±% |
|---|---|---|---|---|
| Parti Québécois | Catherine Gentilcore | 11,935 | 52.74 | +33.86 |
| Coalition Avenir Québec | Alex Gagné | 6,513 | 28.78 | -20.66 |
| Liberal | Virginie Bouchard | 1,845 | 8.15 | -2.02 |
| Québec solidaire | Nadia Poirier | 1,029 | 4.55 | -8.11 |
| Conservative | Ange Claude Bigilimana | 845 | 3.73 | -4.20 |
| Climat Québec | Benoit Beauchamp | 175 | 0.77 | – |
| Parti culinaire | Jean-Louis Thémis | 145 | 0.64 | – |
| Union Nationale | Eric Bernier | 95 | 0.42 | – |
| Parti accès propriété et équité | Shawn Lalande McLean | 48 | 0.21 | – |
| Total valid votes | | 22,630 | 98.80 | |
| Total rejected ballots | | 276 | 1.20 | -0.08 |
| Turnout | | 22,906 | 37.28 | -33.91 |
| Electors on the lists | | 61,451 | | |
| Parti Québécois gain from Coalition Avenir Québec | | Swing | | +27.27 |

=== Post-election controversy ===
Nadia Poirier, a second-time QS nominee, complained afterwards about the lack of support she received from the party, noting that none of its 12 MNAs came out to help in her campaign and that the party had solidarity in name only. The party responded that, as Terrebonne had been a péquiste stronghold for 25 years, it allocated its resources based on a serious analysis of its chances of winning. In June 2025, Poirier announced that she was leaving QS to join the PQ.

== See also ==
- Terrebonne in the 2025 Canadian federal election
- 2026 Terrebonne federal by-election
