= Élie Fallu =

Canadian politician (1932–2025)

Mayor of Sainte-Thérèse
- In office 1987–2005

MNA for Groulx
- In office 1981–1985
- Preceded by: District created
- Succeeded by: Madeleine Bleau

MNA for Terrebonne
- In office 1976–1981
- Preceded by: Denis Hardy
- Succeeded by: Yves Blais

Personal details
- Born: March 2, 1932 Nouvelle, Quebec, Canada
- Died: October 14, 2025 (aged 93)
- Party: Parti Québécois Progressive Conservative

Élie Fallu (March 2, 1932 – October 14, 2025) was a Canadian politician in the province of Quebec, who was a two-term member of the National Assembly of Quebec, representing the district of Terrebonne in 1976–1981 and the district of Groulx in 1981–1985. He was a member of the Parti Québécois.

== Early life and education ==
Fallu was born in the Gaspésie area on March 2, 1932, into a farming household. He attended University of Ottawa, Université de Montréal, Université Laval, University of Sorbonne and held a PhD in History.

== Career ==
He was a card-carrying member of the Progressive Conservative Party of Canada in 1957 and 1958.

Fallu ran for a seat in the Parliament of Quebec in 1976, against Liberal incumbent Denis Hardy and won with 51% of the vote. He was re-elected in a two-way race in 1981 with 57% of the vote, but was narrowly defeated in 1985, with 47% of the vote, against Liberal candidate Madeleine Bleau.

He served as a cabinet member in the administrations of Premiers René Lévesque and Pierre-Marc Johnson.

Fallu also was mayor of Sainte-Thérèse, Quebec from 1987 until 2005.

== Death ==
Fallu died on October 14, 2025, at the age of 93.
