= Linda Caron =

Canadian politician

Linda Caron MNA

Member of the National Assembly of Quebec for La Pinière
- Incumbent
- Assumed office October 3, 2022
- Preceded by: Gaétan Barrette

Personal details
- Born: Montreal
- Party: Quebec Liberal Party

Linda Caron is a Canadian politician, who was elected to the National Assembly of Quebec in the 2022 Quebec general election. She represents the riding of La Pinière as a member of the Quebec Liberal Party. As of September 7, 2024, she serves as the critic for Seniors, Informal Caregivers and Homecare as well as the critic for Montérégie.

== Electoral record ==
2022 Quebec general election: La Pinière
Party	Candidate	Votes	%	±%
Liberal	Linda Caron	12,688	38.51	-8.56
Coalition Avenir Québec	Samuel Gatien	10,272	31.17	+2.34
Conservative	Tzarevna Bratkova	3,345	10.15	+8.83
Québec solidaire	Jean-Claude Mugaba	3,301	10.02	-0.02
Parti Québécois	Suzanne Gagnon	2,577	7.82	-1.06
Green	Ryan Akshay Newbergher	396	1.20	-0.58
Canadian	Donna Pinel	371	1.13	–
Total valid votes		32,950	–	
Total rejected ballots		301	–	
Turnout		59.9%		
Electors on the lists		55,509	–	–
