= Denis Hardy (politician) =

Canadian politician

Member of the National Assembly of Quebec for Terrebonne
- In office 1965–1966
- Preceded by: Lionel Bertrand
- Succeeded by: Hubert Murray
- In office 1970–1976
- Preceded by: Hubert Murray
- Succeeded by: Élie Fallu

Vice President of the National Assembly of Quebec
- In office 1970–1973
- Preceded by: Roland Théorêt
- Succeeded by: Harry Blank

Personal details
- Born: 27 January 1936 Saint-Thérèse, Quebec
- Died: 12 May 2016 (aged 80)
- Party: Liberal

Denis Hardy (27 January 1936 – 12 May 2016) was a Canadian Liberal Quebec politician.

He was born in Sainte-Thérèse, Quebec to Hervé Hardy and Jeanne Lafleur. He studied law and political science at the University of Montreal and went on to practice law. He then became a professor of law and political science at Collège Lionel-Groulx.

He was elected as the member of the National Assembly of Quebec for Terrebonne in 1965 and was defeated for re-election the next year. He was then elected to the same position in 1970 and 1973, serving from 1970 until 1976. He was the body's Vice President from 1970 until 1973.

Hardy married Rosemère Caron in 1969. After retiring, he held many civic positions and practiced law with the firm of Duquette and Hardy.
