= Gaétan Barrette =

Canadian politician

Doctor Gaétan Barrette
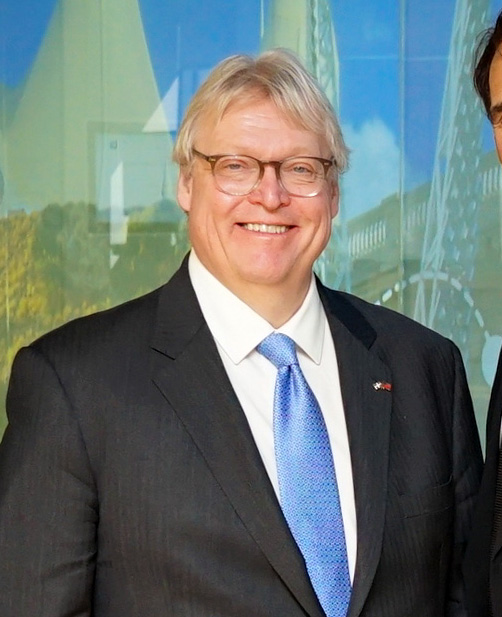

Minister of Health
- In office April 23, 2014 – October 18, 2018
- Premier: Philippe Couillard
- Preceded by: Réjean Hébert
- Succeeded by: Danielle McCann

Member of the National Assembly of Quebec for La Pinière
- In office April 7, 2014 – August 28, 2022
- Preceded by: Fatima Houda-Pepin
- Succeeded by: Linda Caron

Personal details
- Born: July 5, 1956 (age 70) La Tuque, Quebec
- Party: Quebec Liberal Party; Coalition Avenir Québec (formerly)
- Education: Université de Montréal; University of Grenoble; University of California, San Diego
- Profession: Radiologist

Gaétan Barrette (born July 5, 1956) is a Canadian politician in Quebec, who was elected to the National Assembly of Quebec in the 2014 election. He represented the electoral district of La Pinière as a member of the Quebec Liberal Party until retiring from politics at the 2022 Quebec general election.

Prior to his election to the legislature, he was a radiologist at Montreal's Hôpital Maisonneuve-Rosemont. He ran in the 2012 election as a candidate of the Coalition Avenir Québec in Terrebonne, but ran as a Liberal in 2014. He was named Minister of Health and Social Services on April 24, 2014. His tenure as heath minister was considered so controversial that leader Philippe Couillard instead tapped Getrude Bourdon, who resigned from her role as the CEO of the Laval University hospital to run as a candidate in the riding of Jean-Lesage if the party won the 2018 election.

== Indigenous Health ==
As Health Minister of Quebec, in 2018 Dr. Barrette opposed the families and physicians who were fighting against Quebec's practise of not allowing Indigenous families to accompany their critically ill children on flight transportation for urgent care. He was recorded making the comment "I guarantee you that there will be at least one instance in the next six months where someone will not be allowed to get on the plane. Why? Because no one — agitated, drugged, under whatever influence — would get on the plane at any cost. That will not happen. And that happens all the time." Indigenous leaders called for his immediate resignation, and did not accept his delayed, eventual apology. The ministry did later change regulations to allow for caregivers or parents to accompany their ill children on urgent medical air transfers, after years of discussions.

== Electoral record ==
2018 Quebec general election
Party	Candidate	Votes	%	±%
Liberal	Gaétan Barrette	15,476	47.07	-11.22
Coalition Avenir Québec	Sylvia Baronian	9,480	28.83	+16.25
Québec solidaire	Marie Pagès	3,300	10.04	+6.16
Parti Québécois	Suzanne Gagnon	2,921	8.88	-15.6
Green	Aziza Dini	585	1.78	-0.13
Conservative	Anwar El Youbi	435	1.32	+0.66
New Democratic	Djaouida Sellah	354	1.08	New
Independent	Patrick Hayes	168	0.51	-
Independent	Fang Hu	161	0.49	-
Total valid votes		32,869	98.69	-0.16
Total rejected ballots		390	1.31	+0.16
Turnout		33,304	61.07	-13.7
Electors on the lists		54,534	-	-

2014 Quebec general election: La Pinière
Party	Candidate	Votes	%	±%
Liberal	Gaétan Barrette	25,955	58.29	+9.04
Independent	Fatima Houda-Pepin	10,452	23.47	-25.78
Coalition Avenir Québec	Jin Kim	5,600	12.58	-11.91
Québec solidaire	Johane Beaupré	1,728	3.88	-0.51
Option nationale	François Létourneau-Prézeau	534	1.20	+0.16
Conservative	Sebastian Fernandez	256	0.57	-0.07
Total valid votes		44,525	98.85	–
Total rejected ballots		520	1.15	–
Turnout		45,045	74.77	+2.64
Electors on the lists		60,247	–	–

2012 Quebec general election: Terrebonne
Party	Candidate	Votes	%	±%
Parti Québécois	Mathieu Traversy	19,077	44.53	-0.69
Coalition Avenir Québec	Gaétan Barrette	15,429	36.02	+14.45*
Liberal	Josée Gingras	5,646	13.18	-14.33
Québec solidaire	Yan Smith	1,380	3.22	+0.61
Green	Benoit Carignan	635	1.48	-1.61
Option nationale	Marc-André Dénommée	510	1.19	–
Coalition pour la constituante	Patrick Dubé	160	0.37	–
Total valid votes		42,837	98.72	–
Total rejected ballots		554	1.28	–
Turnout		43,391	80.21	+19.74
Electors on the lists		54,100	–	–

* Result compared to Action démocratique

Quebec provincial government of Philippe Couillard
Cabinet post (1)
Predecessor	Office	Successor
Réjean Hébert	Minister of Health and Social Services; April 23, 2014–October 18, 2018	Danielle McCann
