= Marc-André Plante =

Canadian politician

- In office November 5, 2017 – November 15, 2021
- Preceded by: Stéphane Berthe (interim)
- Succeeded by: Mathieu Traversy

Personal details
- Born: Terrebonne
- Party: Alliance démocratique de Terrebonne

Marc-André Plante is a Canadian politician. He was mayor of Terrebonne, Quebec, the 10th largest city in Quebec from 2017 to 2021. He was elected as mayor while the Terrebonne City Council was being investigated by the Unité permanente anticorruption (Permanent Anti-corruption unit).

== Biography ==
After founding the Alliance démocratique de Terrebonne party on January 31, 2017, he announced he launched his campaign for mayor on May 29, 2017 in the 2017 mayoral election. He was elected as mayor on November 5, 2017, succeeding interim mayor Stéphane Berthe, who in November 2016 had replaced previous mayor Jean-Marc Robitaille who was under investigation by the Permanent Anti-corruption unit. Integrity and corruption were among the main themes of the 2017 mayoral election. In the election, Plante received 13,883 votes, or 42.0% of the vote, defeating Berthe, who won 10,371 votes, which amounted for 31.4% of the vote.

During his term as mayor, the permanent anti-corruption unit continued their investigation of members of the previous council. In March 2018, five members of the former municipal administration who were under the leadership of mayor Robitaille were arrested by the permanent anti-corruption unit.

After having been elected as mayor of Terrebonne, Plante also served as a member of the Les Moulins regional council and the Regional conference of elected officers for Lanaudière.

Plante was defeated in the 2021 mayoral election by Mathieu Traversy.

Before entering municipal politics, Plante was director general of the Carrefour Action Municipale et Famille, which was in charge of developing municipal family policies in the province.

In 2006, Plante received a certificate in administration from the University of Quebec at Montreal. When he was elected as mayor, Plante was about to receive a Master's Degree in public administration, specializing in municipal management from the École nationale d'administration publique (National School of Public Administration).
