= Jean-François Therrien =

Canadian politician

MNA for Terrebonne
- In office April 25, 2007 – November 5, 2008
- Preceded by: Jocelyne Caron
- Succeeded by: Mathieu Traversy

Personal details
- Born: 1969 (age 56–57) Quebec City, Quebec, Canada
- Party: Action démocratique du Québec

Jean-François Therrien (born 1969) is a politician from Quebec, Canada. He was an Action démocratique du Québec Member of the National Assembly for the electoral district of Terrebonne from 2007 to 2008.

Therrien has a bachelor's degree in law from the Université Laval and a master's degree in public administration from the École nationale d'administration publique (ENAP).

Therrien was born in Quebec City, Quebec, Canada. He briefly worked at the Casino de Charlevoix before joining the Youth Protection Agency (Direction de la protection de la Jeunesse) and later the Ministry of Public Security as a special constable and later the Quebec Public Servants as an investigator. He was also a volunteer for several years for the Operation Red Nose, a non-profit organization responsible for accompanied party goers at home and preventing drunk driving during the December holidays.

Before his election, he was a public servant employed by the Ministère du Revenu du Québec (revenue department).

Therrien was first elected in the 2007 election with 41% of the vote. Parti Québécois incumbent Jocelyne Caron finished second with 36% of the vote. Therrien took office on April 12, 2007 and was named the critic for labour.
