= La Pinière =

Provincial electoral district in Quebec, Canada

Quebec electoral district
- Location in Longueuil

Provincial electoral district
- Legislature: National Assembly of Quebec
MNA
Linda Caron
Liberal
- District created: 1988
- First contested: 1989
- Last contested: 2026

Demographics
- Population (2021): 81,627
- Electors (2022): 55,509
- Area (km²): 41.97
- Pop. density (per km²): 1,944.9
- Census division: Longueuil (part)
- Census subdivision: Brossard

La Pinière (French pronunciation: [la pinjɛʁ]) is a provincial electoral district in the urban agglomeration of Longueuil, a suburb of Montreal in the Montérégie region of Quebec, Canada, that elects members to the National Assembly of Quebec. Its territory corresponds to the city of Brossard, less its "P" and "V" sectors that are located north of Autoroute 10 and west of Taschereau Boulevard.

It was created for the 1989 election from part of La Prairie electoral district.

In the change from the 2001 to the 2011 electoral map, its territory was unchanged.

In the change from the 2011 to the 2017 electoral map, which first applied in the 2018 election, it lost the area around the Champlain Mall to the riding of Laporte.

== Members of the National Assembly ==
This riding has elected the following members of the National Assembly:

Legislature	Years	Member	Party
Riding created from La Prairie
34th	1989–1994	Jean-Pierre Saintonge	Liberal
35th	1994–1998	Fatima Houda-Pepin	Liberal
36th	1998–2003	Fatima Houda-Pepin	Liberal
37th	2003–2007	Fatima Houda-Pepin	Liberal
38th	2007–2008	Fatima Houda-Pepin	Liberal
39th	2008–2012	Fatima Houda-Pepin	Liberal
40th	2012–2014	Fatima Houda-Pepin	Liberal
40th	2014–2014	Fatima Houda-Pepin	Independent
41st	2014–2018	Gaétan Barrette	Liberal
42nd	2018–2022	Gaétan Barrette	Liberal
43rd	2022–2026	Linda Caron	Liberal
44th	2026–Present	Linda Caron	Liberal

== Election results ==
2026 Quebec general election
** Preliminary results — Not yet official **
Party	Candidate	Votes	%	±%
Liberal	Linda Caron	17,248	50.05	+11.54
Parti Québécois	Sarah Plante	4,969	14.42	+6.60
Conservative	Tzarevna Bratkova	4,234	12.29	+2.14
Québec solidaire	Jacinthe Chapleau	3,848	11.17	+1.15
Coalition Avenir Québec	Clément Mireault	3,371	9.78	–21.39
Green	Tina Jiuru Zhu	544	1.58	+0.38
Canadian	Emilia Farcutiu	246	0.71	–0.42
Total valid votes		34,460	98.90	
Total rejected ballots		382	1.10	
Turnout		34,842	59.15	
Electors on the lists		58,907		
Liberal hold		Swing		+2.47
Source: Élections Québec

2022 Quebec general election
Party	Candidate	Votes	%	±%
Liberal	Linda Caron	12,688	38.51	-8.56
Coalition Avenir Québec	Samuel Gatien	10,272	31.17	+2.34
Conservative	Tzarevna Bratkova	3,345	10.15	+8.83
Québec solidaire	Jean-Claude Mugaba	3,301	10.02	-0.02
Parti Québécois	Suzanne Gagnon	2,577	7.82	-1.06
Green	Ryan Akshay Newbergher	396	1.20	-0.58
Canadian	Donna Pinel	371	1.13	–
Total valid votes		32,950	–	
Total rejected ballots		301	–	
Turnout		59.9%		
Electors on the lists		55,509	–	–

2018 Quebec general election
Party	Candidate	Votes	%	±%
Liberal	Gaétan Barrette	15,476	47.07	-11.22
Coalition Avenir Québec	Sylvia Baronian	9,480	28.83	+16.25
Québec solidaire	Marie Pagès	3,300	10.04	+6.16
Parti Québécois	Suzanne Gagnon	2,921	8.88	-15.6
Green	Aziza Dini	585	1.78	-0.13
Conservative	Anwar El Youbi	435	1.32	+0.66
New Democratic	Djaouida Sellah	354	1.08	
Independent	Patrick Hayes	168	0.51	
Independent	Fang Hu	161	0.49	
Total valid votes		32,880	98.69	
Total rejected ballots		435	1.31	
Turnout		33,315	61.09	
Eligible voters		54,534		
Liberal hold		Swing		-13.735
Source(s) "Rapport des résultats officiels du scrutin". Élections Québec.

2014 Quebec general election
Party	Candidate	Votes	%	±%
Liberal	Gaétan Barrette	25,955	58.29	+9.04
Independent	Fatima Houda-Pepin	10,452	23.47	-25.78
Coalition Avenir Québec	Jin Kim	5,600	12.58	-11.92
Québec solidaire	Johane Beaupré	1,728	3.88	-0.51
Option nationale	François Létourneau-Prézeau	534	1.20	+0.16
Conservative	Sebastian Fernandez	256	0.57	-0.07
Total valid votes		44,525	98.85	–
Total rejected ballots		520	1.15	+0.28
Turnout		45,045	74.77	+2.64
Electors on the lists		60,247	–	–
Liberal hold		Swing		-7.22

2012 Quebec general election
Party	Candidate	Votes	%	±%
Liberal	Fatima Houda-Pepin	20,551	49.25	-12.19
Coalition Avenir Québec	François Lemay	10,220	24.49	+14.57*
Parti Québécois	Pierre O. Thibert	7,448	17.85	-6.92
Québec solidaire	Johane Beaupré	1,832	4.39	+0.98
Green	Marc-André Beauchemin	798	1.91	-8.01
Option nationale	Mylaine Larocque	433	1.04	–
Conservative	Claude Chalhoub	269	0.64	–
Quebec Citizens' Union	Sean Connolly-Boutin	111	0.27	–
Marxist–Leninist	Serge Patenaude	62	0.15	-0.31
Total valid votes		41,724	99.12	–
Total rejected ballots		369	0.88	–
Turnout		42,093	72.13	+19.96
Electors on the lists		58,360	–	–

* Result compared to Action démocratique

2008 Quebec general election
Party	Candidate	Votes	%	±%
Liberal	Fatima Houda-Pepin	17,480	61.44	+11.00
Parti Québécois	Jocelyne Duguay-Varfalvy	7,046	24.77	+6.96
Action démocratique	Marc-André Beauchemin	2,822	9.92	-14.62
Québec solidaire	Nadine Beaudoin	971	3.41	+0.97
Marxist–Leninist	Serge Patenaude	131	0.46	–
Total valid votes		28,450	98.50	–
Total rejected ballots		434	1.50	–
Turnout		28,884	52.17	-14.34
Electors on the lists		55,370	–	–

2007 Quebec general election
Party	Candidate	Votes	%	±%
Liberal	Fatima Houda-Pepin	17,786	50.44	-13.92
Action démocratique	Marc-André Beauchemin	8,654	24.54	+13.01
Parti Québécois	Saloua Hassoun	6,281	17.81	-4.91
Green	Claude Breton	1,684	4.78	–
Québec solidaire	Jean-Claude Bernheim	860	2.44	–
Total valid votes		35,265	99.13	–
Total rejected ballots		311	0.87	–
Turnout		35,576	66.51	-3.45
Electors on the lists		53,488	–	–

2003 Quebec general election
Party	Candidate	Votes	%	±%
Liberal	Fatima Houda-Pepin	22,474	64.36	+3.63
Parti Québécois	Marcel Lussier	7,934	22.72	-6.82
Action démocratique	Gérard Lachance	4,026	11.53	+2.68
Bloc Pot	Inti Ortega	487	1.39	–

1998 Quebec general election
Party	Candidate	Votes	%	±%
Liberal	Fatima Houda-Pepin	22,849	60.73	-1.95
Parti Québécois	Marià Teresa Pérez-Hudon	11,113	29.54	-4.81
Action démocratique	François Hébert	3,330	8.85	–
Democratic Socialist	Gabriel Ste-Marie	125	0.33	–
Independent	Gislaine Langlois	78	0.21	–
Innovateur	Jean Marie Belin	75	0.20	–
Independent	Jason Wabha	52	0.14	–

1995 Quebec referendum
Side	Votes	%
Non	28,261	66.88
Oui	13,996	33.12

1994 Quebec general election
Party	Candidate	Votes	%	±%
Liberal	Fatima Houda-Pepin	22,252	62.68	+4.52
Parti Québécois	André Kahlé	12,195	34.35	-0.13
Natural Law	Jennyfer Leung	597	1.68	–
Sovereignty	Debbie Dutrisac	457	1.29	–

1992 Charlottetown Accord referendum
Side	Votes	%
Oui	20,526	56.87
Non	15,568	43.13

1989 Quebec general election
Party	Candidate	Votes	%
Liberal	Jean-Pierre Saintonge	17,155	58.16
Parti Québécois	Christiane Rouillard Lafontaine	10,170	34.48
New Democratic	Luis Martinez	1,237	4.19
Parti indépendantiste	François Gilbert	935	3.17

== See also ==
- List of Quebec provincial electoral districts
- Canadian provincial electoral districts
