= Mathieu Traversy =

Canadian politician

His Worship Mathieu Traversy
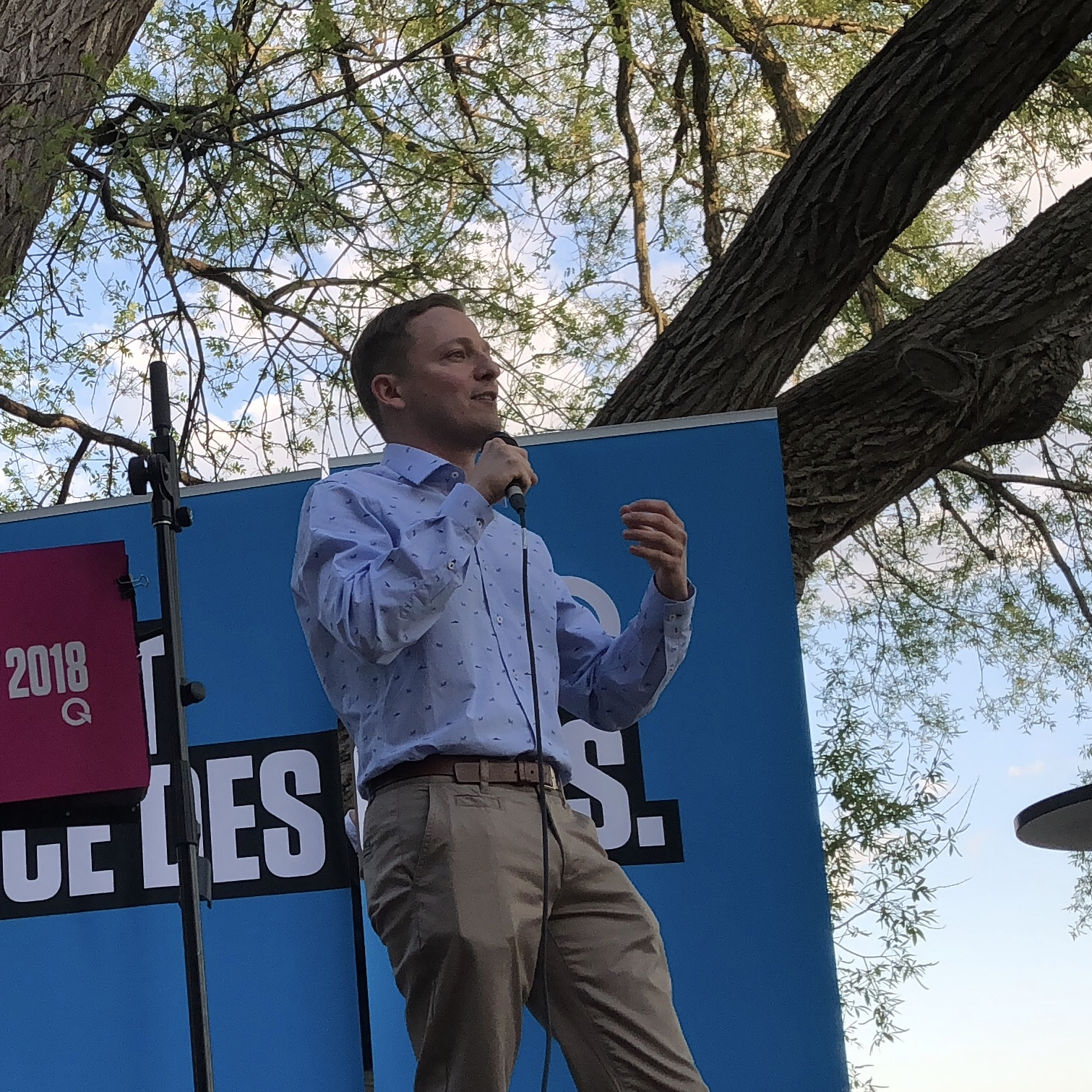
- Mathieu Traversy Investiture 2018.

Mayor of Terrebonne
- Incumbent
- Assumed office November 15, 2021
- Preceded by: Marc-André Plante

Member of the National Assembly of Quebec for Terrebonne
- In office December 8, 2008 – October 1, 2018
- Preceded by: Jean-François Therrien
- Succeeded by: Pierre Fitzgibbon

Personal details
- Born: May 31, 1984 (age 41) Mascouche, Quebec
- Party: Parti Québécois

Mathieu Traversy is a Canadian politician in the province of Quebec. Since 2021, he has been the mayor of Terrebonne. Previously, he represented the riding of Terrebonne in the National Assembly of Quebec from the 2008 provincial election until his defeat in the 2018 provincial election. He was a member of the Parti Québécois.

Traversy attended the Cégep régional de Lanaudière in Terrebonne and later the Université du Québec à Montréal in political science. He previously worked in the department of recreation for the city of Terrebonne.

Traversy defeated Jean-François Therrien of the ADQ in the 2008 elections.

== Electoral record ==
2018 Quebec general election: Terrebonne
Party	Candidate	Votes	%	±%
Coalition Avenir Québec	Pierre Fitzgibbon	17,638	42.97	+8.60
Parti Québécois	Mathieu Traversy	12,106	29.49	-6.73
Québec solidaire	Anne B-Godbout	5,279	12.86	+6.48
Liberal	Margaux Selam	4,976	12.12	-9.89
Green	Carole Dubois	522	1.27	
Conservative	Jules Néron	287	0.70	
Citoyens au pouvoir	Mathieu Goyette	244	0.59	
Total valid votes		41,052	98.23	
Total rejected ballots		741	1.77	-0.26
Turnout		41,793	72.34	-1.86
Eligible voters		57,776		
Coalition Avenir Québec gain from Parti Québécois		Swing		+7.67
Source(s) "Rapport des résultats officiels du scrutin". Élections Québec.

2014 Quebec general election
Party	Candidate	Votes	%	±%
Parti Québécois	Mathieu Traversy	14,450	36.22	-8.31
Coalition Avenir Québec	Jean-François Jarry	13,707	34.36	-1.66
Liberal	Meriem Glia	8,780	22.01	+8.83
Québec solidaire	Yan Smith	2,543	6.37	+3.15
Option nationale	Jean-François Jacob	411	1.03	-0.16
Total valid votes		39,891	97.97	–
Total rejected ballots		826	2.03	–
Turnout		40,717	74.20	-6.01
Electors on the lists		54,874	–	–

2012 Quebec general election
Party	Candidate	Votes	%	±%
Parti Québécois	Mathieu Traversy	19,077	44.53	-0.69
Coalition Avenir Québec	Gaétan Barrette	15,429	36.02	+14.45*
Liberal	Josée Gingras	5,646	13.18	-14.33
Québec solidaire	Yan Smith	1,380	3.22	+0.61
Green	Benoit Carignan	635	1.48	-1.61
Option nationale	Marc-André Dénommée	510	1.19	–
Coalition pour la constituante	Patrick Dubé	160	0.37	–
Total valid votes		42,837	98.72	–
Total rejected ballots		554	1.28	–
Turnout		43,391	80.21	+19.74
Electors on the lists		54,100	–	–

* Result compared to Action démocratique

2008 Quebec general election
Party	Candidate	Votes	%	±%
Parti Québécois	Mathieu Traversy	15,475	45.22	+8.91
Liberal	Chantal Leblanc	9,414	27.51	+11.41
Action démocratique	Jean-François Therrien	7,381	21.57	-19.69
Green	Yoland Gilbert	1,056	3.09	-0.52
Québec solidaire	Sabrina Perreault	892	2.61	-0.11
Total valid votes		34,218	98.05	–
Total rejected ballots		680	1.95	–
Turnout		34,898	60.47	-16.04
Electors on the lists		57,710	–	–
