= Ginette Grandmont =

Canadian politician

MNA for Masson
- In office April 25, 2007 – November 5, 2008
- Preceded by: Luc Thériault
- Succeeded by: Guillaume Tremblay

Personal details
- Party: Action démocratique du Québec
- Profession: real estate broker

Ginette Grandmont is a politician from Quebec, Canada. She was an Action démocratique du Québec Member of the National Assembly for the electoral district of Masson from 2007 to 2008.

== Background ==
She is from Drummondville and relocated to Charlemagne. She holds a degree from the Institut d'hôtellerie du Québec and worked as a real estate broker for nearly 20 years with Re-Max and Royal LePage. She was also the owner of a RE/MAX franchise in Saint-Jean-sur-Richelieu for five years, and a volunteer for Operation Red Nose and Operation Enfant Soleil.

== Member of the Provincial Legislature ==
Grandmont was first elected in the 2007 election with 44% of the vote. Parti Québécois incumbent Luc Thériault finished second with 36% of the vote. Grandmont took office on April 12, 2007. She ran again in the 2008 election but was defeated by PQ candidate Guillaume Tremblay.

== Federal politics ==
She campaigned on behalf of local Conservative candidate Claude Carignan during the federal election of 2008. Carignan finished a distant second against Bloc Québécois candidate Luc Desnoyers in the district of Rivière-des-Mille-Îles.
