= Mathieu Lemay =

Canadian politician from Quebec (born 1979)

Member of the National Assembly of Quebec for Masson
- In office April 7, 2014 – August 27, 2026
- Preceded by: Diane Hamelin
- Succeeded by: Stéphane Handfield

Personal details
- Born: 1979 Montreal
- Party: Coalition Avenir Québec

Mathieu Lemay (born 1979) is a Canadian politician in Quebec, who was elected to the National Assembly of Quebec in the 2014 election. He represented the electoral district of Masson as a member of the Coalition Avenir Québec. He did not seek re-election in the 2026 general election.

== Electoral record ==
2022 Quebec general election: Masson
Party	Candidate	Votes	%	±%
Coalition Avenir Québec	Mathieu Lemay	18,195	51.60	–1.45
Parti Québécois	Stéphane Handfield	6,432	18.24	–1.47
Québec solidaire	Émile Bellerose-Simard	4,610	13.07	–0.37
Conservative	François Truchon	2,972	8.43	+7.64
Liberal	Gabriel Bourret	2,723	7.72	–3.17
Green	Marc-André Bélisle	332	0.94	–1.17
Total valid votes		35,264	98.73	+0.39
Total rejected ballots		453	1.27	–0.39
Turnout		35,717	71.16	–1.70
Electors on the lists		50,194	–	–

2018 Quebec general election: Masson
Party	Candidate	Votes	%	±%
Coalition Avenir Québec	Mathieu Lemay	17,565	53.05	+14.7
Parti Québécois	Diane Hamelin	6,527	19.71	-17.09
Québec solidaire	Stephane Durupt	4,451	13.44	+7.16
Liberal	Maryanne Beauchamp	3,606	10.89	-6.12
Green	Véronique Dubois	699	2.11	
Conservative	David Morin	263	0.79	+0.07
Total valid votes		33,111	98.34	
Total rejected ballots		560	1.66	
Turnout		33,671	72.86	
Eligible voters		46,214		
Coalition Avenir Québec hold		Swing		+15.895
Source(s) "Rapport des résultats officiels du scrutin". Élections Québec.

2014 Quebec general election
Party	Candidate	Votes	%	±%
Coalition Avenir Québec	Mathieu Lemay	13,235	38.35	+2.21
Parti Québécois	Diane Hamelin	12,701	36.80	-9.15
Liberal	Wenet Féné	5,869	17.01	+5.96
Québec solidaire	Joëlle St-Pierre	2,168	6.28	+3.11
Option nationale	Pierre-Alexandre Bugeaud	289	0.84	-1.06
Conservative	Éric Giroux	249	0.72	–
Total valid votes		34,511	97.66	–
Total rejected ballots		827	2.34	+0.94
Turnout		35,338	69.51	-8.66
Electors on the lists		50,840	–	–
Coalition Avenir Québec gain from Parti Québécois		Swing		+5.68
