= Stéphane Handfield =

Stéphane Handfield MNA

Member of the National Assembly for Masson
- Incumbent
- Assumed office October 5, 2026
- Preceded by: Mathieu Lemay

Personal details
- Party: Parti Québécois

Stéphane Handfield is a Canadian politician who is a candidate for the National Assembly of Quebec for Masson in the 2026 Quebec general election as a member of the Parti Québécois.

An immigration lawyer, Handfield was previously the PQ co-spokesperson on immigration.

== Electoral record ==
2026 Quebec general election: Masson
** Preliminary results — Not yet official **
Party	Candidate	Votes	%	±%
Parti Québécois	Stéphane Handfield	15,609	40.27	
Liberal	Martin Gaulin	7,137	18.41	
Conservative	Benoit Lanoue	6,694	17.27	
Coalition Avenir Québec	Anik Girard	6,034	15.57	
Québec solidaire	Stéphane Durupt	3,283	8.47	
Total valid votes				
Total rejected ballots				
Turnout			71.34	
Electors on the lists			–	–
Source: Élections Québec

2022 Quebec general election: Masson
Party	Candidate	Votes	%	±%
Coalition Avenir Québec	Mathieu Lemay	18,195	51.60	–1.45
Parti Québécois	Stéphane Handfield	6,432	18.24	–1.47
Québec solidaire	Émile Bellerose-Simard	4,610	13.07	–0.37
Conservative	François Truchon	2,972	8.43	+7.64
Liberal	Gabriel Bourret	2,723	7.72	–3.17
Green	Marc-André Bélisle	332	0.94	–1.17
Total valid votes		35,264	98.73	+0.39
Total rejected ballots		453	1.27	–0.39
Turnout		35,717	71.16	–1.70
Electors on the lists		50,194	–	–
