= Fatima Houda-Pepin =

Canadian politician

MNA for La Pinière
- In office September 12, 1994 – April 7, 2014
- Preceded by: Jean-Pierre Saintonge
- Succeeded by: Gaétan Barrette

Personal details
- Born: December 26, 1951 (age 74) Meknes, Morocco
- Party: Quebec Liberal Party (1994-2014); Independent (2014-present)
- Cabinet: First Vice-President of the National Assembly of Quebec

Fatima Houda-Pepin (born December 26, 1951) is a Quebec politician and a former member of the National Assembly of Quebec, Canada. She represented the La Pinière electoral district (the city of Brossard) between 1994 and 2014, and was a member from the Quebec Liberal Party until 2014.

She was born in Meknes, Morocco. After doing studies in political sciences at Mohammed V University in Rabat and earning a bachelor's degree in commerce at Lycée Al Khansa in Casablanca, she obtained a bachelor's degree in political sciences at Université Laval, a master's degree in international relations at the University of Ottawa, a doctor's degree in international relations at Université de Montréal and a master's degree in library and information science at McGill University.

She was a researcher in information society issues and has made international trips to study the evolution of information technology. She has worked as a consultant for the federal and provincial governments as well as for the city of Montreal. She was also a lecturer at Université de Montréal and the Université du Québec à Montréal. She received, for her work in the community, the Governor General's Commemorative Medal in 1992 and was honoured during Women's History Month in 1993. She was also a member on the Montérégie development board.

She was first elected in 1994 and served as critic for international affairs, French-language affairs, immigration and cultural communities. Re-elected in 1998, she was the critic for housing, information highway and government services. Re-elected when the Liberals regained power in 2003, she was named the Chair of the Agriculture, Fisheries and Food committee.

During the 2007 election, Houda-Pepin was again the La Pinière candidate for the Quebec Liberal Party and was elected with 50.44% of the votes. She was named the First Vice-President of the National Assembly.

On January 20, 2014, Houda-Pepin was expelled from the Quebec Liberal Party due to disagreement with the party's views. The Liberal party had come out against the Charter of Quebec Values, legislation that would strip people from minority religions such as Jews and Muslims the right to wear "overt" religious symbols in public service. Catholics would be permitted to wear small crucifixes which is already the norm for adherents. The same proposed charter retains prominent Catholic symbols including a crucifix over the chair of the Quebec national assembly. Houda-Pepin argued that state employees employed in a coercive role should not wear religious symbols.

She ran for reelection in the 2014 election as an independent. The Parti Québécois opted not to run a candidate in the riding, instead directing its supporters to vote for Houda-Pepin. On election day, however, she was defeated by new Liberal candidate Gaétan Barrette.

Houda-Pepin lost a defamation lawsuit. A judge ordered her to pay $20,000 in moral damages and $4,000 in punitive damages to the mayor of Brossard, Paul Leduc. Houda-Pepin wrote a letter published by a Rive-Sud newspaper claiming falsely that Leduc delivered a "turnkey election" for Barrette.
