= Jean Prévost (politician) =

Canadian politician

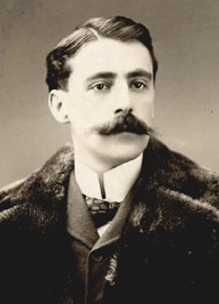
Jean Prévost

Jean Prévost, KC (November 17, 1870 – July 21, 1915) was a Quebec lawyer, journalist and political figure. He represented Terrebonne in the Legislative Assembly of Quebec as a Liberal from 1900 to 1912 and as an Independent Liberal from 1912 to 1915.

He was born in Sainte-Scholastique, Quebec (later Mirabel) in 1870, the son of Wilfrid Prévost, and studied at the Collège Sainte-Marie de Montréal and the Université Laval in Montreal. Prévost graduated with a LLB, was called to the Quebec bar in 1894 and set up practice at Saint-Jérôme. He was managing editor of L'Avenir du Nord from 1902 to 1903. In 1903, he became a King's Counsel. He was named Minister of colonization, mines and fisheries in the provincial cabinet in 1905. He resigned this post in 1907 after he was accused of corruption, so that he could sue his accusers. Prévost came into conflict with the Liberals over his opposition to the creation of a Canadian navy and later ran as an Independent Liberal.

He died of cancer at Montreal in 1915 while still in office and was buried at Saint-Jérôme.

His cousin, Jules-Édouard Prévost, was a member of the Canadian House of Commons.
