= Diane Hamelin =

Canadian politician

MNA for Masson
- In office 2012–2014
- Preceded by: Guillaume Tremblay
- Succeeded by: Mathieu Lemay

Personal details
- Party: Parti Québécois

Diane Gadoury Hamelin is a Canadian politician. She was a Parti Québécois member of the National Assembly of Quebec for the riding of Masson from 2012 to 2014, first elected in the 2012 election.
