= Louise Sauvé-Cuerrier =

Canadian politician

Louise Sauvé-Cuerrier (February 15, 1926 – September 16, 2023) is an educator and former politician in Quebec. She represented Vaudreuil-Soulanges in the Quebec National Assembly from 1976 to 1981 as a Parti Québécois member.

The daughter of Louis-Ovide Sauvé, a tramway conductor, and Germaine Descostes, she was born Louise Sauvé in Montreal. She studied at the École Normale Jacques-Cartier and the Institut pédagogique there and at the Université de Montréal, receiving training in teaching for the physically disabled. She taught for the Catholic school board in Montreal and the Vaudreuil school board. She also established a day-care facility in Pierrefonds. She was a representative for the teachers' union in the Mille-Isles area.

She was a warden for Notre-Dame-de-la-Protection parish.

She ran unsuccessfully as a Parti Québécois candidate in Vaudreuil-Soulanges in 1973. She was elected in 1976 but was defeated when she ran for reelection in 1981. She was deputy speaker for the assembly from December 1976 to May 1981.

She was a member of the Commission municipale du Québec from 1982 to 1992, when she retired. She received a bachelor's degree in law from the Université Laval in 1985.

She married Roger Cuerrier. He died in November 2016.
