= Catherine Gentilcore =

Canadian politician

Catherine Gentilcore MNA
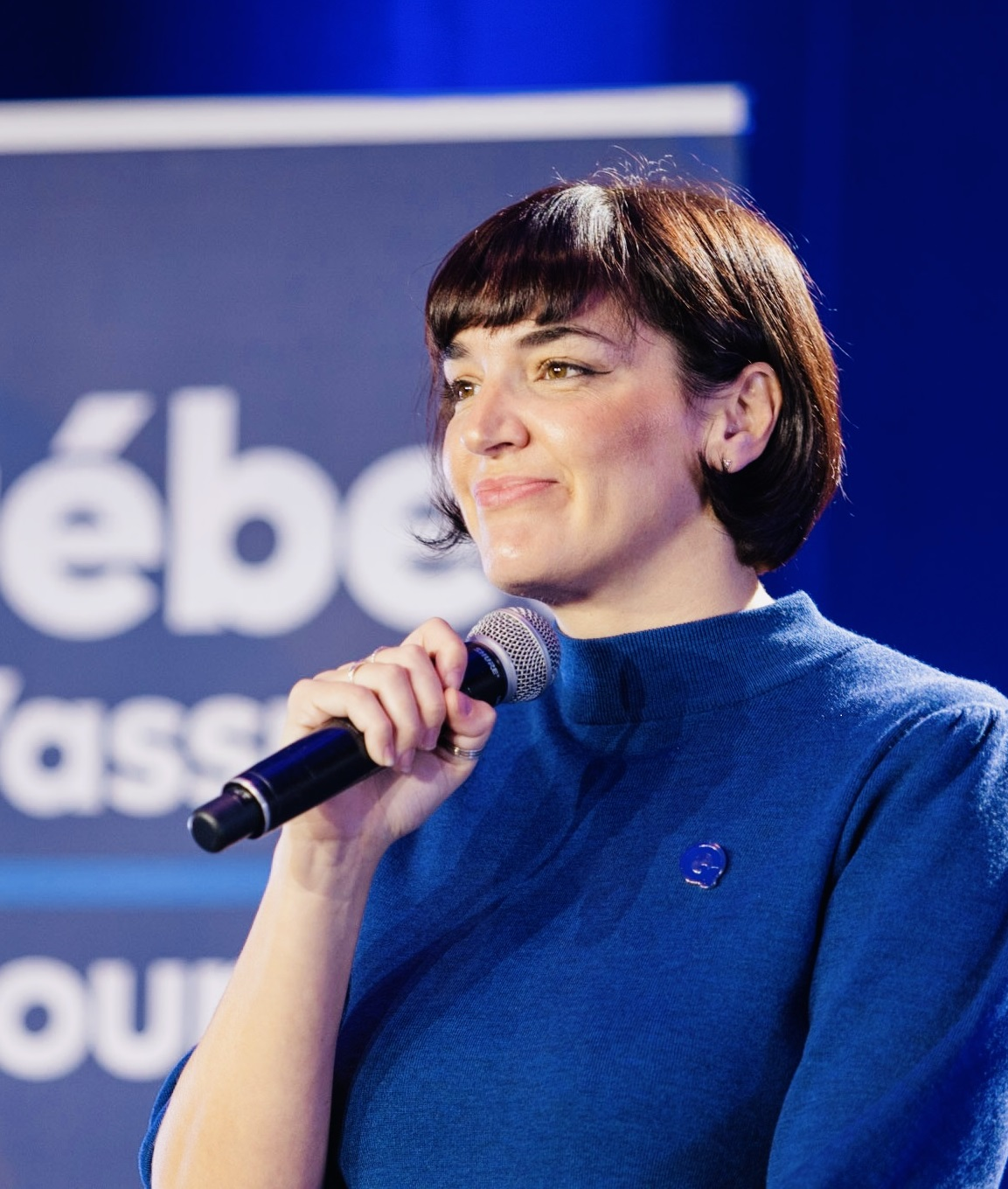
- Catherine Gentilcore in 2023

Deputy Premier of Quebec
- Incumbent
- Assumed office October 21, 2026
- Premier: Paul St-Pierre Plamondon
- Preceded by: Ian Lafrenière

Minister of Immigration and the Accession to the Independence of Quebec
- Incumbent
- Assumed office October 21, 2026
- Premier: Paul St-Pierre Plamondon
- Preceded by: François Bonnardel (Immigration)

President of the Parti Québécois
- In office October 28, 2023 – November 5, 2025
- Preceded by: Jocelyn Caron
- Succeeded by: Jerry Beaudoin

Member of the National Assembly of Quebec for Terrebonne
- Incumbent
- Assumed office March 17, 2025
- Preceded by: Pierre Fitzgibbon

Personal details
- Born: October 19, 1985 (age 41) Repentigny, Quebec, Canada
- Party: Parti Québécois
- Education: University of Montreal

Catherine Gentilcore MNA (born October 19, 1985) is a Canadian politician, activist, and manager, who served as deputy premier of Quebec since 2026. A member of the Parti Québécois (PQ), She was elected to the National Assembly of Quebec in a 2025 provincial by-election representing the electoral district of Terrebonne.

== Biography ==
Catherine Gentilcore holds a bachelor's degree in classical singing. She also pursued graduate studies in journalism at the Université de Montréal and in marketing communications at HEC Montréal. Catherine Gentilcore was marketing director of the Montreal daily newspaper Le Devoir, the Opéra de Montréal and C2 Montréal, before assuming the position of President and CEO of Numana, a company working in the field of digital technologies.

Gentilcore is an advocate for Quebec independence. She promotes engagement with Anglophones for the cause of sovereignty.

She became vice-president of the National Executive Council of the Parti Québécois in December 2021 and was elected president of the political party in October 2023.

On March 20, 2024, Catherine Gentilcore asked the Director General of Élections Québec to investigate the compliance with the law of certain donations from elected officials and municipal administrators to the Coalition avenir Québec, the political party forming the government.

On November 28, 2024, the Parti Québécois announced that Catherine Gentilcore would be the party's candidate in the by-election in the riding of Terrebonne. The main issue in the campaign was the United States trade war with Canada and Mexico. She was the main challenger to the incumbent CAQ which had held the seat since 2018. She won the seat in a gain for the PQ. After her election she became the only PQ woman MNA. She was joined after the 2026 Chicoutimi provincial by-election by Marie-Karlynn Laflamme.

In October 2026, Gentilcore was appointed deputy premier of Quebec and minister of immigration and accession to the independence of Quebec in the 44th Quebec Legislature under the leadership of Paul St-Pierre Plamondon.

As Minister of Immigration and Integration, Gentilcore announced a reduction in Quebec's immigration targets. In November 2026, she confirmed that she intends to maintain a target of 35,000 permanent immigrants per year and to reduce temporary immigration by half. She also called on the federal government to reimburse Quebec for costs associated with receiving asylum seekers.

== Electoral history ==
2026 Quebec general election: Terrebonne
** Preliminary results — Not yet official **
Party	Candidate	Votes	%	±%
Parti Québécois	Catherine Gentilcore	15,336	39.51	
Liberal	Ange Claude Bigilimana	7,703	19.85	
Conservative	Marianne Poirier	6,020	15.51	
Coalition Avenir Québec	Valérie Doyon	5,788	14.91	
Québec solidaire	Ariane Drainville	3,665	9.44	
Climat Québec	Benoit Beauchamp	300	0.77	
Total valid votes				
Total rejected ballots				
Turnout			71.21	
Electors on the lists			–	–
Parti Québécois gain from Coalition Avenir Québec		Swing		+
Source: Élections Québec

Quebec provincial by-election, March 17, 2025: Terrebonne Resignation of Pierre Fitzgibbon
** Preliminary results — Not yet official **
Party	Candidate	Votes	%	±%
Parti Québécois	Catherine Gentilcore	11,935	52.74	+33.86
Coalition Avenir Québec	Alex Gagné	6,513	28.78	-20.66
Liberal	Virginie Bouchard	1,845	8.15	-2.02
Québec solidaire	Nadia Poirier	1,029	4.55	-8.11
Conservative	Ange Claude Bigilimana	845	3.73	-4.20
Climat Québec	Benoit Beauchamp	175	0.77	–
Parti culinaire	Jean-Louis Thémis	145	0.64	–
Union Nationale	Eric Bernier	95	0.42	–
Parti accès propriété et équité	Shawn Lalande McLean	48	0.21	–
Total valid votes		22,630	98.80	
Total rejected ballots		276	1.20	-0.08
Turnout		22,906	37.28	-33.91
Electors on the lists		61,451		
Parti Québécois gain from Coalition Avenir Québec		Swing		+27.27

== See also ==
- Parti québécois
- Le Devoir
- Opéra de Montréal
- C2 Montréal
