= Jocelyne Caron =

Canadian politician from Quebec

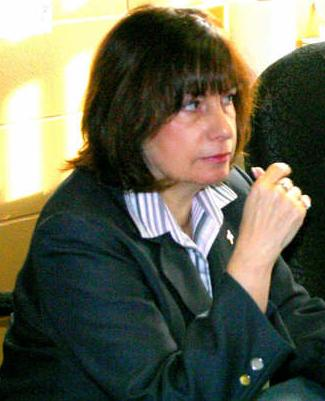

Member of Parliament
- In office 1989–2007
- Preceded by: Yves Blais
- Succeeded by: Jean-François Therrien

Personal details
- Born: May 5, 1951 (age 75)
- Party: Parti québécois
- Relatives: Lucien Caron (uncle)

Jocelyne Caron (born April 23, 1951) is a Canadian politician from Quebec. She was a Parti québécois Member of Parliament in the National Assembly of Quebec representing Terrebonne from 1989 to 2007.

== Life and career ==
Caron obtained a Diploma of College Studies from College Marguerite-Bourgeoys, a music degree from Conservatoire de musique du Québec à Montréal, and a bachelor's degree in secondary education and history of Université du Québec à Montréal. She was a professor from 1973 to 1982. From 1981 to 1989, she worked in the office of the Terrebonne MP, then served as MP for Terrebonne for 4 terms.

Caron is a feminist who often advocated around women's issues. She turned down the vice-president position in the National Assembly to become a leader in Head of Government in the 36th National Assembly of Quebec, the first woman to hold this position. She was the representative of the Opposition officielle during the 37th National Assembly of Quebec. During the race for the leadership of the Parti québécois, Caron was supported by longtime friend and colleague Pauline Marois. Caron founded the Youth Commission of Terrebonne to advocate for youth issues, and cross-cultural outreach. Caron was defeated in the 2007 Quebec general election. She lost to Action démocratique du Québec candidate Jean-François Therrien.
