= Pierre Fitzgibbon =

Canadian politician

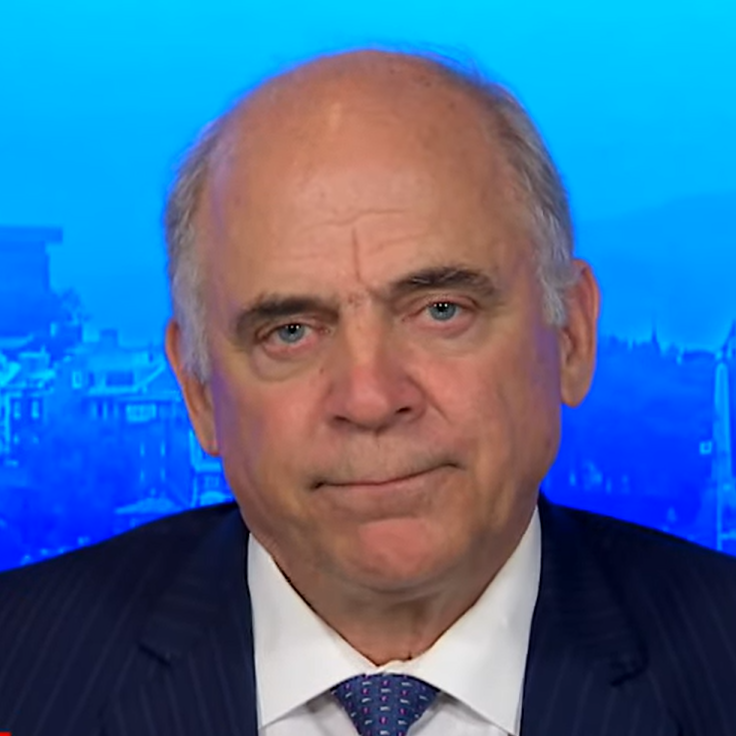
- Fitzgibbon in 2023

Member of the National Assembly of Quebec for Terrebonne
- In office October 1, 2018 – September 4, 2024
- Preceded by: Mathieu Traversy
- Succeeded by: Catherine Gentilcore

Personal details
- Born: 10 November 1954 (age 71) Montreal, Quebec, Canada
- Party: Coalition Avenir Québec

Pierre Fitzgibbon (born November 10, 1954) is a Canadian businessman and former politician who served as Quebec's Minister of the Economy, Innovation and Energy from 2022 to 2024, having previously served as Minister of the Economy and Innovation from 2018 to 2022. A member of the Coalition Avenir Québec (CAQ), he represented the electoral district of Terrebonne in the National Assembly of Quebec from 2018 until 2024.

== Early life and education ==
Born in Montreal, Quebec, Fitzgibbon earned a Bachelor of Business Administration from HEC Montréal before qualifying as a Chartered Professional Accountant (CPA). He later completed an executive management certificate at Harvard Business School.

== Career ==
=== Political career ===
Although long active in Quebec's business community, Fitzgibbon did not seek elected office until 2018, when Coalition Avenir Québec leader François Legault recruited several executives from the private sector to strengthen the party's economic credentials. Running in the riding of Terrebonne during the 2018 Quebec general election, Fitzgibbon was elected to the National Assembly and was immediately appointed Minister of the Economy and Innovation.

Following his election in 2018, Fitzgibbon became one of the central figures in Premier François Legault's economic agenda as Minister of the Economy and Innovation. Following the CAQ's re-election in 2022, his portfolio expanded to include energy, regional economic development, and responsibility for the Montreal region and he oversaw a broad portfolio encompassing industrial development, innovation, critical minerals and energy policy, regional economic development, and the Montréal region.

During the COVID-19 pandemic, he directed a series of economic recovery measures, including liquidity and financing programs administered through Investissement Québec, while promoting initiatives to modernize manufacturing and strengthen the competitiveness of Quebec businesses.

He was instrumental in attracting major investments in Quebec in various sectors and in the creation of some Innovation Zones in areas where Quebec has a competitive hedge such as aerospace, quantum computing, digital technology, energy transition, and mining. He also advocated for faster industrial permitting processes and expanded hydroelectric capacity to accommodate energy-intensive industrial projects, arguing that Quebec's abundant renewable electricity represented a strategic competitive advantage in attracting global investment.

He resigned from the National Assembly and cabinet in September 2024.

=== Business career ===
Before entering politics, Fitzgibbon established a career spanning more than forty years in finance and corporate management. He began at PricewaterhouseCoopers before holding executive positions at Peerless Carpet Corporation, Domtar, Chase Capital Partners Hong Kong, Télésystème Mobiles International, and New World Mobility.

Between 2002 and 2007, he served as Vice Chairman of National Bank Financial and Senior Vice-President and Chief Financial Officer of the National Bank of Canada. From 2007 to 2014, Fitzgibbon served as President and Chief Executive Officer of Atrium Innovations, overseeing the international expansion of the health and nutrition company. He later became a managing partner of Walter Capital in 2015, a Montreal-based private equity firm, before entering provincial politics in 2018. He also served on boards of the Caisse de dépôt et placement du Québec, WSP Global, Héroux-Devtek, Transcontinental, Lumenpulse, Neptune Technologies & Bioressources and Arianne Phosphate.

Following his departure from politics in 2024, he was appointed special advisor at Osler, Hoskin & Harcourt in December 2024.

In 2025, Fitzgibbon joined the Board of Directors of Polykar Inc. (now Invera Flexibles) where he subsequently became chairman.

In 2026, he was appointed Operating Partner at Jolt Capital, a European venture capital firm specializing in deep technology investments.

He now serves as director of the boards of several private companies, and is also on the advisory board of Concordia University's Volt-Age program. He is a director of Fondation HEC Montreal.

== Electoral record ==
2022 Quebec general election: Terrebonne
| Party | Candidate | Votes | % | ±% |
|---|---|---|---|---|
| Coalition Avenir Québec | Pierre Fitzgibbon | 20,911 | 49.44 | +6.48 |
| Parti Québécois | Geneviève Couture | 7,986 | 18.88 | -10.61 |
| Québec solidaire | Nadia Poirier | 5,352 | 12.65 | -0.21 |
| Liberal | Lindsay Jean | 4,301 | 10.17 | -1.95 |
| Conservative | Daniela Andreeva | 3,357 | 7.94 | +7.24 |
| Green | Nazar Tarpinian | 308 | 0.73 | -0.54 |
| Démocratie directe | Marie-France Meloche | 80 | 0.19 | – |
| Total valid votes | | 42,295 | 98.72 | |
| Total rejected ballots | | 549 | 1.28 | -0.49 |
| Turnout | | 42,844 | 71.19 | -1.15 |
| Electors on the lists | | 60,184 | | |
| Coalition Avenir Québec hold | | Swing | | +8.54 |

2018 Quebec general election: Terrebonne
| Party | Candidate | Votes | % | ±% |
|---|---|---|---|---|
| Coalition Avenir Québec | Pierre Fitzgibbon | 17,638 | 42.97 | +8.60 |
| Parti Québécois | Mathieu Traversy | 12,106 | 29.49 | -6.73 |
| Québec solidaire | Anne B-Godbout | 5,279 | 12.86 | +6.48 |
| Liberal | Margaux Selam | 4,976 | 12.12 | -9.89 |
| Green | Carole Dubois | 522 | 1.27 | |
| Conservative | Jules Néron | 287 | 0.70 | |
| Citoyens au pouvoir | Mathieu Goyette | 244 | 0.59 | |
| Total valid votes | | 41,052 | 98.23 | |
| Total rejected ballots | | 741 | 1.77 | -0.26 |
| Turnout | | 41,793 | 72.34 | -1.86 |
| Eligible voters | | 57,776 | | |
| Coalition Avenir Québec gain from Parti Québécois | | Swing | | +7.67 |
Source(s) "Rapport des résultats officiels du scrutin". Élections Québec.

Quebec provincial government of François Legault
Cabinet post (1)
| Predecessor | Office | Successor |
|---|---|---|
| Dominique Anglade | Minister of Economy and Innovation; October 18, 2018–June 2, 2021 | Eric Girard |
