= Guillaume Tremblay =

Canadian politician

His Worship Guillaume Tremblay

Mayor of Mascouche
- Incumbent
- Assumed office 2013
- Preceded by: Denise Paquette

MNA for Masson
- In office 2008–2012
- Preceded by: Ginette Grandmont
- Succeeded by: Diane Hamelin

Personal details
- Born: April 14, 1984 (age 42) Mascouche, Quebec, Canada
- Party: Parti Québécois (provincial); Vision démocratique de Mascouche (municipal)
- Education: Cégep régional de Lanaudière
- Profession: businessman

Guillaume Tremblay (born April 14, 1984) is a Canadian politician. Formerly a Parti Québécois member of the National Assembly of Quebec from 2008 to 2012, he is currently serving as the mayor of Mascouche.

Born in Mascouche, Quebec, Tremblay attended the Cégep régional de Lanaudière in Terrebonne and obtained a degree in administration. He was also elected as an independent city councilor in Mascouche in 2005 and served as the director of a local electronic store in Lachenaie.

He was elected to represent the riding of Masson in the 2008 provincial election, defeating incumbent Ginette Grandmont of the ADQ. He did not run for re-election in the 2012 provincial election.

He announced his intention to run for mayor of Mascouche in the 2013 municipal election. He won the election with 53.6 per cent of the vote.
