= Madeleine Bleau =

Canadian politician

Madeleine Bleau

Madeleine Bleau (October 22, 1928 – July 11, 2014) was a Canadian politician. She represented Groulx in the National Assembly of Quebec from 1985 to 1994 as a Liberal.

The daughter of Charles-Eugène Lavallée and Marie-Anne Lemieux, she was born Madeleine Lavallée in Montreal and was educated at the Collège Viauville de Montréal and the Collège Jésus-Marie de Saint-Barthélémy. From 1947 to 1950, she worked in the office of the newspaper La Presse in Montreal. Bleau founded the parent teacher association for the Bois-des-Filion school board and served as its president from 1967 to 1970. From 1974 to 1977, she served on the municipal council for Bois-des-Filion. She was secretary for the "No" committee in the 1980 Quebec referendum. From 1981 to 1985, she was president of the executive for the Liberal Party in Groulx. She married Jean Bleau.

She was elected to the Quebec assembly in 1985, defeating Parti Québécois incumbent Élie Fallu, and was reelected in 1989; she did not run for reelection in 1994. From 1989 to 1994, she served as deputy whip of the Bourassa government.

After retiring from politics, she served as president of the financing campaign and then as a member of the administrative council for the foundation supporting the Centre hospitalier de soins de longue durée (CHSLD) Drapeau Deschambault in Sainte-Thérèse.

She died in Saint-Eustache at the age of 85.
