= Roger Lefebvre =

Canadian lawyer and politician

Member of the National Assembly of Quebec for Frontenac
- In office December 2, 1985 – November 30, 1998
- Preceded by: Gilles Grégoire
- Succeeded by: Marc Boulianne

Personal details
- Born: June 23, 1943 (age 83) Black Lake, Quebec
- Party: Quebec Liberal Party

Roger Lefebvre (born June 23, 1943) is a lawyer and politician from Quebec, he served in the Daniel Johnson Jr. government.

== Biography ==
Lefebvre was born in Black Lake, Quebec to Arthur Lefebvre, a businessman, and Agathe Beaudoin. He studied at Cégep de Thetford and the Université de Sherbrooke, obtaining his law degree in 1967, he was called to the bar in 1968 and practiced law at Roy, Lefebvre, Gosselin & Ouellet from 1968 to 1985.

== Political career ==
In 1985, he ran for the Liberal party in the open seat of Frontenac, that was vacated by Gilles Grégoire who had been found guilty of child sexual abuse and won. He was easily re-elected in 1989 and 1994.

He served as Deputy House Leader from 1985 until 1990 in the government of Robert Bourassa and was elected as a Vice President of the National Assembly of Quebec, a role he served in until January 11, 1994 when he was named Minister of Justice and Minister for Electoral Reform in the short-lived Daniel Johnson Jr. government.

Lefebvre managed to survive the 1994 election and was named Deputy Opposition House Leader, he did not run for re-election in 1998. Since leaving the legislature he has continued to practice law. He served President of the Commission for the Protection of the Agricultural Territory of Quebec.
