= Terrebonne (provincial electoral district) =

Provincial electoral district in Quebec, Canada

Coordinates: 45.72°N 73.68°W

Quebec electoral district

Provincial electoral district
- Legislature: National Assembly of Quebec
MNA
Catherine Gentilcore
Parti Québécois
- District created: 1867
- First contested: 1867
- Last contested: 2026

Demographics
- Population (2011): 72,295
- Electors (2012): 53,897
- Area (km²): 88.7
- Pop. density (per km²): 815.1
- Census division: Les Moulins (part)
- Census subdivision: Terrebonne (part)

Terrebonne (French pronunciation: [tɛʁbɔn]) is a provincial electoral district in Quebec, Canada. that elects members to the National Assembly of Quebec. It consists of all of the city of Terrebonne except for the former cities of La Plaine and Lachenaie.

It was created for the 1867 election (and an electoral district of that name existed earlier in the Legislative Assembly of the Province of Canada and the Legislative Assembly of Lower Canada).

In the change from the 2001 to the 2011 electoral map, it lost part of the city of Terrebonne to the L'Assomption electoral district.

In 2026, it lost the community of Saint-Louis-de-Terrebonne.

== Members of the Legislative Assembly / National Assembly ==
Legislature	Years	Member	Party
1st	1867–1871	Joseph-Adolphe Chapleau	Conservative
2nd	1871–1875	Joseph-Adolphe Chapleau	Conservative
3rd	1875–1878	Joseph-Adolphe Chapleau	Conservative
4th	1878–1881	Joseph-Adolphe Chapleau	Conservative
5th	1881–1882	Joseph-Adolphe Chapleau	Conservative
5th	1882–1886	Guillaume-Alphonse Nantel	Conservative
6th	1886–1890	Guillaume-Alphonse Nantel	Conservative
7th	1890–1892	Guillaume-Alphonse Nantel	Conservative
8th	1892–1897	Guillaume-Alphonse Nantel	Conservative
9th	1897–1900	Guillaume-Alphonse Nantel	Conservative
10th	1900–1904	Jean Prévost	Liberal
11th	1904–1908	Jean Prévost	Liberal
12th	1908–1912	Jean Prévost	Liberal
13th	1912–1916	Jean Prévost	Liberal
14th	1916–1919	Athanase David	Liberal
15th	1919–1923	Athanase David	Liberal
16th	1923–1927	Athanase David	Liberal
17th	1927–1931	Athanase David	Liberal
18th	1931–1935	Athanase David	Liberal
19th	1935–1936	Athanase David	Liberal
20th	1936–1939	Hermann Barrette	Union Nationale
21st	1939–1940	Athanase David	Liberal
21st	1940–1944	Hector-Joseph-Damase Perrier	Liberal
22nd	1944–1948	Joseph-Léonard Blanchard	Union Nationale
23rd	1948–1952	Joseph-Léonard Blanchard	Union Nationale
24th	1952–1956	Joseph-Léonard Blanchard	Union Nationale
25th	1956–1960	Joseph-Léonard Blanchard	Union Nationale
26th	1960–1962	Lionel Bertrand	Liberal
27th	1962–1964	Lionel Bertrand	Liberal
27th	1965–1966	Denis Hardy	Liberal
28th	1966–1970	Hubert Murray	Union Nationale
29th	1970–1973	Denis Hardy	Liberal
30th	1973–1976	Denis Hardy	Liberal
31st	1976–1981	Élie Fallu	Parti Québécois
32nd	1981–1985	Yves Blais	Parti Québécois
33rd	1985–1989	Yves Blais	Parti Québécois
34th	1989–1994	Jocelyne Caron	Parti Québécois
35th	1994–1998	Jocelyne Caron	Parti Québécois
36th	1998–2003	Jocelyne Caron	Parti Québécois
37th	2003–2007	Jocelyne Caron	Parti Québécois
38th	2007–2008	Jean-François Therrien	Action démocratique
39th	2008–2012	Mathieu Traversy	Parti Québécois
40th	2012–2014	Mathieu Traversy	Parti Québécois
41st	2014–2018	Mathieu Traversy	Parti Québécois
42nd	2018–2022	Pierre Fitzgibbon	Coalition Avenir Québec
43rd	2022–2024	Pierre Fitzgibbon	Coalition Avenir Québec
43rd	2025–2026	Catherine Gentilcore	Parti Québécois
44th	2026–Present	Catherine Gentilcore	Parti Québécois

== Historical controversies ==
In the 1935 provincial election, the election of Athanase David was contested on the ground that the ballot papers were not printed in the form prescribed under the Election Act. At the subsequent hearing, the judge ruled that all cast ballots were thus void. Immediately afterwards, the returning officer announced that, as this resulted in a 0–0 tie, he cast his deciding vote in favour of David. The returning officer's action was considered to have been without precedent anywhere in the world in countries with parliamentary-style legislatures. The Conservatives lodged an appeal, but the result was upheld by the Quebec Court of Appeal in April 1936. David would become the only member of the Assembly in Quebec history to be elected on only one cast vote.

In the March 2025 provincial by-election, while the riding flipped from the CAQ back to the PQ after being held for two elections by Pierre Fitzgibbon, Québec solidaire was also squeezed out of third place by the PLQ, dropping in support by over eight percentage points (while the Liberals had lost two points). Nadia Poirier, a second-time QS nominee, complained afterwards about the lack of support she received from the party, noting that none of its 12 MNAs came out to help in her campaign and that the party had solidarity in name only. QS responded that, as Terrebonne had been a péquiste stronghold for 25 years, it allocated its resources based on a serious analysis of its chances of winning. In June 2025, Poirier announced that she was leaving QS to join the PQ.

== Election results ==
2026 Quebec general election
** Preliminary results — Not yet official **
Party	Candidate	Votes	%	±%
Parti Québécois	Catherine Gentilcore	15,336	39.51	
Liberal	Ange Claude Bigilimana	7,703	19.85	
Conservative	Marianne Poirier	6,020	15.51	
Coalition Avenir Québec	Valérie Doyon	5,788	14.91	
Québec solidaire	Ariane Drainville	3,665	9.44	
Climat Québec	Benoit Beauchamp	300	0.77	
Total valid votes				
Total rejected ballots				
Turnout			71.21	
Electors on the lists			–	–
Parti Québécois gain from Coalition Avenir Québec		Swing		+
Source: Élections Québec

Quebec provincial by-election, March 17, 2025 Resignation of Pierre Fitzgibbon
Party	Candidate	Votes	%	±%
Parti Québécois	Catherine Gentilcore	11,935	52.74	+33.86
Coalition Avenir Québec	Alex Gagné	6,513	28.78	-20.66
Liberal	Virginie Bouchard	1,845	8.15	-2.02
Québec solidaire	Nadia Poirier	1,029	4.55	-8.11
Conservative	Ange Claude Bigilimana	845	3.73	-4.20
Climat Québec	Benoit Beauchamp	175	0.77	–
Parti culinaire	Jean-Louis Thémis	145	0.64	–
Union Nationale	Eric Bernier	95	0.42	–
Parti accès propriété et équité	Shawn Lalande McLean	48	0.21	–
Total valid votes		22,630	98.80	
Total rejected ballots		276	1.20	-0.08
Turnout		22,906	37.28	-33.91
Electors on the lists		61,451		
Parti Québécois gain from Coalition Avenir Québec		Swing		+27.27

2022 Quebec general election redistributed results
Party	Vote	%
Coalition Avenir Québec	18,469	50.36
Parti Québécois	7,013	19.12
Québec solidaire	4,646	12.67
Liberal	3,452	9.41
Conservative	2,758	9.41
Others	334	0.91

2022 Quebec general election
Party	Candidate	Votes	%	±%
Coalition Avenir Québec	Pierre Fitzgibbon	20,911	49.44	+6.48
Parti Québécois	Geneviève Couture	7,986	18.88	-10.61
Québec solidaire	Nadia Poirier	5,352	12.65	-0.21
Liberal	Lindsay Jean	4,301	10.17	-1.95
Conservative	Daniela Andreeva	3,357	7.94	+7.24
Green	Nazar Tarpinian	308	0.73	-0.54
Démocratie directe	Marie-France Meloche	80	0.19	–
Total valid votes		42,295	98.72	
Total rejected ballots		549	1.28	-0.49
Turnout		42,844	71.19	-1.15
Electors on the lists		60,184		
Coalition Avenir Québec hold		Swing		+8.54

2018 Quebec general election
Party	Candidate	Votes	%	±%
Coalition Avenir Québec	Pierre Fitzgibbon	17,638	42.97	+8.60
Parti Québécois	Mathieu Traversy	12,106	29.49	-6.73
Québec solidaire	Anne B-Godbout	5,279	12.86	+6.48
Liberal	Margaux Selam	4,976	12.12	-9.89
Green	Carole Dubois	522	1.27	
Conservative	Jules Néron	287	0.70	
Citoyens au pouvoir	Mathieu Goyette	244	0.59	
Total valid votes		41,052	98.23	
Total rejected ballots		741	1.77	-0.26
Turnout		41,793	72.34	-1.86
Eligible voters		57,776		
Coalition Avenir Québec gain from Parti Québécois		Swing		+7.67
Source(s) "Rapport des résultats officiels du scrutin". Élections Québec.

2014 Quebec general election
Party	Candidate	Votes	%	±%
Parti Québécois	Mathieu Traversy	14,450	36.22	-8.31
Coalition Avenir Québec	Jean-François Jarry	13,707	34.36	-1.66
Liberal	Meriem Glia	8,780	22.01	+8.83
Québec solidaire	Yan Smith	2,543	6.37	+3.15
Option nationale	Jean-François Jacob	411	1.03	-0.16
Total valid votes		39,891	97.97	–
Total rejected ballots		826	2.03	+0.75
Turnout		40,717	74.20	-6.00
Electors on the lists		54,874	–	–
Parti Québécois hold		Swing		–3.33

2012 Quebec general election
Party	Candidate	Votes	%	±%
Parti Québécois	Mathieu Traversy	19,077	44.53	-1.09
Coalition Avenir Québec	Gaétan Barrette	15,429	36.02	+14.57*
Liberal	Josée Gingras	5,646	13.18	-14.02
Québec solidaire	Yan Smith	1,380	3.22	+0.67
Green	Benoit Carignan	635	1.48	-1.70
Option nationale	Marc-André Dénommée	510	1.19	–
Coalition pour la constituante	Patrick Dubé	160	0.37	–
Total valid votes		42,837	98.72	–
Total rejected ballots		554	1.28	–
Turnout		43,391	80.21	+21.12
Electors on the lists		54,100	–	–
Parti Québécois hold		Swing		–7.83

Change is from redistributed results.
* Result compared to Action démocratique

2008 Quebec general election redistributed results
Party	Vote	%
Parti Québécois	13,706	45.62
Liberal	8,173	27.20
Action démocratique	6,444	21.45
Green	955	3.18
Québec solidaire	766	2.55
Total valid votes		30,044
Turnout		59.08
Electors on the lists		50,849

2008 Quebec general election
Party	Candidate	Votes	%	±%
Parti Québécois	Mathieu Traversy	15,475	45.22	+8.91
Liberal	Chantal Leblanc	9,414	27.51	+11.42
Action démocratique	Jean-François Therrien	7,381	21.57	-19.69
Green	Yoland Gilbert	1,056	3.09	-0.53
Québec solidaire	Sabrina Perreault	892	2.61	-0.11
Total valid votes		34,218	98.05	–
Total rejected ballots		680	1.95	+0.69
Turnout		34,898	60.47	-16.04
Electors on the lists		57,710	–	–
Parti Québécois gain from Action démocratique		Swing		+14.30

2007 Quebec general election
Party	Candidate	Votes	%	±%
Action démocratique	Jean-François Therrien	17,224	41.26	+23.09
Parti Québécois	Jocelyne Caron	15,160	36.31	-12.38
Liberal	Chantal Leblanc	6,720	16.10	-15.81
Green	Pierre-Charles De Guise	1,508	3.61	–
Québec solidaire	Jean Baril	1,136	2.72	+1.48*
Total valid votes		41,748	98.74	–
Total rejected ballots		531	1.26	-0.52
Turnout		42,279	76.51	+3.21
Electors on the lists		55,256	–	–
Action démocratique gain from Parti Québécois		Swing		+17.74

* Result compared to UFP

2003 Quebec general election
Party	Candidate	Votes	%	±%
Parti Québécois	Jocelyne Caron	17,327	48.69	-10.78
Liberal	Marcel Théorêt	11,353	31.91	+8.97
Action démocratique	Jean-Pierre Parrot	6,463	18.16	+1.16
Green	Pierre-Charles De Guise	1,508	3.61	–
UFP	Marco Legrand	440	1.24	+0.65
Total valid votes		35,583	98.23	–
Total rejected ballots		642	1.77	+0.50
Turnout		36,225	73.31	-7.72
Electors on the lists		49,415	–	–
Parti Québécois hold		Swing		-9.88

1998 Quebec general election
Party	Candidate	Votes	%	±%
Parti Québécois	Jocelyne Caron	21,252	59.47	-0.92
Liberal	François Duval	8,195	22.93	-2.32
Action démocratique	Serge Cazelais	6,077	17.01	+3.53
Socialist Democracy	Richard Chartier	210	0.59	
Total valid votes		35,734	98.72	–
Total rejected ballots		462	1.28	-0.80
Turnout		36,196	81.03	-2.17
Electors on the lists		44,671	–	–
Parti Québécois hold		Swing		+0.70

1994 Quebec general election
Party	Candidate	Votes	%	±%
Parti Québécois	Jocelyne Caron	19,671	60.39	+8.36
Liberal	Danyelle Byles	8,227	25.26	-17.03
Action démocratique	Jean-Claude Ouellette	4,389	13.47	
Natural Law	Rita Lambert	285	0.87	
Total valid votes		32,572	97.92	–
Total rejected ballots		692	2.08	-0.86
Turnout		33,264	83.20	+7.23
Electors on the lists		39,981	–	–
Parti Québécois hold		Swing		+12.69

1989 Quebec general election
Party	Candidate	Votes	%	±%
Parti Québécois	Jocelyne Caron	15,693	52.03	-4.63
Liberal	Marcel Lorrain	12,753	42.28	+2.96
Green	Françoise Filion	1,714	5.68	
Total valid votes		30,160	97.06	–
Total rejected ballots		915	2.94	+1.00
Turnout		31,075	75.97	+0.60
Electors on the lists		40,905	–	–
Parti Québécois hold		Swing		-3.80

1985 Quebec general election
Party	Candidate	Votes	%	±%
Parti Québécois	Yves Blais	18,555	56.67	-6.58
Liberal	Jocelyn Poirier	12,877	39.33	+5.44
New Democratic	Johanne Morin	810	2.47	
United Social Credit	Jean Louis Poirier	428	1.31	
Christian Socialist	Alain Michaud	74	0.23	
Total valid votes		32,744	98.06	
Total rejected ballots		649	1.94	+0.90
Turnout		33,393	75.37	-8.63
Electors on the lists		44,308		
Parti Québécois hold		Swing		-6.01

1981 Quebec general election
Party	Candidate	Votes	%	±%
Parti Québécois	Yves Blais	19,344	63.25	+12.63
Liberal	Jean-Yves Chartrand	10,363	33.88	+2.04
Union Nationale	Gabriel Desjardins	878	2.87	-10.73
Total valid votes		30,585	98.96	
Total rejected ballots		322	1.04	-0.71
Turnout		30,907	84.00	-5.48
Electors on the lists		36,794		
Parti Québécois hold		Swing		+5.30

1976 Quebec general election
Party	Candidate	Votes	%	±%
Parti Québécois	Élie Fallu	21,298	50.61	+10.22
Liberal	Denis Hardy	13,399	31.84	-20.68
Union Nationale	Marcel Ayotte	5,723	13.60	+12.29
Ralliement créditiste	Guy Meunier	1,661	3.95	
Total valid votes		42,081	99.24	–
Total rejected ballots		749	1.75	+0.27
Turnout		42,830	89.48	+3.78
Electors on the lists		47,867	–	–
Parti Québécois gain from Liberal		Swing		+15.45

1973 Quebec general election
Party	Candidate	Votes	%	±%
Liberal	Denis Hardy	17,255	52.52	+6.98
Parti Québécois	Guy Mercier	13,271	40.39	+13.50
Parti créditiste	Gilles Martin	1,829	5.57	-1.95
Union Nationale	Bernard Bourbonnais	431	1.31	-18.74
Independent	Ginette Da Sylva Poirier	68	0.21	
Total valid votes		32,854	98.52	–
Total rejected ballots		494	1.48	
Turnout		33,348	85.69	
Electors on the lists		38,915	–	–
Liberal hold		Swing		-3.26

1970 Quebec general election
Party	Candidate	Votes	%	±%
Liberal	Denis Hardy	30,452	45.54	+2.68
Parti Québécois	Guy Mercier	17,985	26.90	+25.59
Union Nationale	Eddy Monette	13,406	20.05	-27.66
Ralliement créditiste	Jean-Marc Fontaine	5,028	7.52	
Total valid votes		66,871	100	–
Liberal gain from Union Nationale		Swing		+15.17

^PQ result compared to Ralliement national

1966 Quebec general election
Party	Candidate	Votes	%	±%
Union Nationale	Hubert Murray	24,840	47.71	
Liberal	Denis Hardy	22,315	42.86	-50.26
RIN	Maurice Dumas	4,227	8.12	
Ralliement national	Gilles Parent	681	1.31	
Total valid votes		52,063	100	–
Union Nationale gain from Liberal		Swing		+48.99

Quebec provincial by-election, January 18, 1965 Appointment of Lionel Bertrand to the Legislative Council of Quebec
Party	Candidate	Votes	%	±%
Liberal	Denis Hardy	21,106	93.12	+34.15
Independent	Lucien Dulude	1,559	6.88	
Total valid votes		22,665	100	–
Liberal hold		Swing		+13.63

1962 Quebec general election
Party	Candidate	Votes	%	±%
Liberal	Lionel Bertrand	26,901	58.98	+0.25
Union Nationale	Lucien Thinel	18,713	41.02	+1.29
Total valid votes		45,614	100	–
Liberal hold		Swing		-0.52

1960 Quebec general election
Party	Candidate	Votes	%	±%
Liberal	Lionel Bertrand	25,936	58.72	+16.80
Union Nationale	Guy Blanchard	17,549	39.73	-17.84
Independent Union Nationale	Félix Maillée	681	1.54	
Total valid votes		44,166	100	–
Liberal gain from Union Nationale		Swing		+17.32

1956 Quebec general election
Party	Candidate	Votes	%	±%
Union Nationale	Joseph-Léonard Blanchard	20,984	57.57	+1.66
Liberal	Paul-Émile Prévost	15,280	41.92	-1.49
Social Democratic	Gisèle Couture	107	0.29	
Labor–Progressive	Lucien Richer	77	0.21	
Total valid votes		36,448	100	–
Union Nationale hold		Swing		+1.58

1952 Quebec general election
Party	Candidate	Votes	%	±%
Union Nationale	Joseph-Léonard Blanchard	17,763	55.91	-4.03
Liberal	Claude Prévost	13,793	43.41	+11.69
Independent Liberal	Paul-Émilien Dalpé	215	0.68	
Total valid votes		31,771	100	–
Union Nationale hold		Swing		-7.86

1948 Quebec general election
Party	Candidate	Votes	%	±%
Union Nationale	Joseph-Léonard Blanchard	16,805	59.94	+10.78
Liberal	Raymond Raymond	8,894	31.72	-12.98
Union des électeurs	Edgar Ouimet	2,337	8.34	
Total valid votes		28,036	100	–
Union Nationale hold		Swing		+11.88

1944 Quebec general election
Party	Candidate	Votes	%	±%
Union Nationale	Joseph-Léonard Blanchard	11,471	49.16	+4.95
Liberal	Lionel Bertrand	10,431	44.70	-10.63
Bloc populaire	Joseph-A.-B. Larche	1,432	6.14	
Total valid votes		23,334	100	–
Union Nationale gain from Liberal		Swing		+7.79

Quebec provincial by-election, November 19, 1940 Appointment of Athanase David to the Senate of Canada
Party	Candidate	Votes	%	±%
Liberal	Hector Perrier	4,827	55.33	+21.16
Union Nationale	Joseph-Léonard Blanchard	3,857	44.21	+2.39
Independent Liberal	Henri Grou	21	0.24	
Independent	Albert Duval	19	0.22	
Total valid votes		8,724	100	–
Liberal hold		Swing		-0.12

1939 Quebec general election
Party	Candidate	Votes	%	±%
Liberal	Athanase David	4,891	53.17	+12.86
Union Nationale	Joseph-Léonard Blanchard	3,847	41.82	-16.98
Action libérale nationale	Maurice-Robert Demers	460	5.00	
Total valid votes		9,198	100	–
Liberal gain from Union Nationale		Swing		+14.92

1936 Quebec general election
Party	Candidate	Votes	%
Union Nationale	Hermann Barrette	5,279	58.81
Liberal	Maurice-Robert Demers	3,619	40.31
Labour	Adélard-Emmanuel Lebeau	79	0.88
Total valid votes		8,977	100

1935 Quebec general election
Party	Candidate	Votes	Elected
Liberal	Athanase David	1	✓
Conservative	Hermann Barrette	0	
The election in this constituency was declared void, as the ballots lacked the signature of the returning officer, breaking the rules of the Quebec Election Act. As a result, the returning officer cast a single ballot for David.

1931 Quebec general election
Party	Candidate	Votes	%	±%
Liberal	Athanase David	4,749	65.97	-8.43
Conservative	Joseph-Léonard Blanchard	2,450	34.03	+8.43
Total valid votes		7,199	100	–
Liberal hold		Swing		-8.43

1927 Quebec general election
Party	Candidate	Votes	%	±%
Liberal	Athanase David	3,682	74.40	+10.35
Conservative	Joseph Proulx	1,267	25.60	-10.35
Total valid votes		4,949	100	–
Liberal hold		Swing		+10.35

1923 Quebec general election
Party	Candidate	Votes	%
Liberal	Athanase David	3,098	64.05
Conservative	Hormidas Deschambault	1,739	35.95
Total valid votes		4,837	100

Quebec provincial by-election, September 6, 1919 Called upon the appointment of Athanase David as Secretary of the Province
Party	Candidate	Votes	Elected
Liberal	Athanase David	acclaimed	✓

1919 Quebec general election
Party	Candidate	Votes	Elected
Liberal	Athanase David	acclaimed	✓

1916 Quebec general election
Party	Candidate	Votes	%	±%
Liberal	Athanase David	3,508	69.94	+7.53
Conservative	Joseph-Camille-L. de Martigny	1,508	30.06	-7.53
Total valid votes		5,016	100	
Liberal hold		Swing		+7.53

1912 Quebec general election
Party	Candidate	Votes	%	±%
Independent Liberal	Jean Prévost	2,238	62.41	+7.56
Conservative	Joseph-Camille-L. de Martigny	1,348	37.59	-7.56
Total valid votes		3,586	100	
Liberal hold		Swing		+7.56

1908 Quebec general election
Party	Candidate	Votes	%
Liberal	Jean Prévost	2,632	54.84
Conservative	Guillaume-Alphonse Nantel	2,167	45.16
Total valid votes		4,799	100

Quebec provincial by-election, July 17, 1905 Called upon the appointment of Jean Prévost to the Executive Council of Quebec
Party	Candidate	Votes	Elected
Liberal	Jean Prévost	acclaimed	✓

1904 Quebec general election
Party	Candidate	Votes	%	±%
Liberal	Jean Prévost	2,708	69.28	+19.03
Conservative	Olivar Asselin	1,201	30.72	-19.03
Total valid votes		3,909	100	
Liberal hold		Swing		+19.03

1900 Quebec general election
Party	Candidate	Votes	%	±%
Liberal	Jean Prévost	2,067	50.24	+3.87
Conservative	Guillaume-Alphonse Nantel	2,047	49.76	-3.87
Total valid votes		4,114	100	
Liberal gain from Conservative		Swing		+3.87

1897 Quebec general election
Party	Candidate	Votes	%
Conservative	Guillaume-Alphonse Nantel	2,143	53.63
Liberal	Achille-Ferdinand Carrier	1,853	46.37
Total valid votes		3,996	100

1892 Quebec general election
Party	Candidate	Votes	Elected
Conservative	Guillaume-Alphonse Nantel	acclaimed	✓

1890 Quebec general election
Party	Candidate	Votes	%	±%
Conservative	Guillaume-Alphonse Nantel	1,793	52.17	-3.62
Liberal	Jules-É. Prévost	1,644	47.83	+3.62
Total valid votes		3,437	100	
Conservative hold		Swing		-3.62

1886 Quebec general election
Party	Candidate	Votes	%
Conservative	Guillaume-Alphonse Nantel	1,552	55.79
Liberal	Damase Limoges	1,230	44.21
Total valid votes		2,782	100

Quebec provincial by-election, August 19, 1882 Called upon the resignation of Joseph-Adolphe Chapleau to run in a federal by-election
Party	Candidate	Votes	Elected
Conservative	Guillaume-Alphonse Nantel	acclaimed	✓

1881 Quebec general election
Party	Candidate	Votes	Elected
Conservative	Joseph-Adolphe Chapleau	acclaimed	✓

Quebec provincial by-election, November 13, 1879 Called upon the resignation of Joseph-Adolphe Chapleau upon being called to form a cabinet by the Lieutenant Governor of Quebec
Party	Candidate	Votes	Elected
Conservative	Joseph-Adolphe Chapleau	acclaimed	✓

1878 Quebec general election
Party	Candidate	Votes	%
Conservative	Joseph-Adolphe Chapleau	1,355	54.42
Liberal	Jules-É. Prévost	1,135	45.58
Total valid votes		2,490	100

Quebec provincial by-election, February 10, 1876 Called upon the appointment of Joseph-Adolphe Chapleau to cabinet
Party	Candidate	Votes	Elected
Conservative	Joseph-Adolphe Chapleau	acclaimed	✓

1875 Quebec general election
Party	Candidate	Votes	%
Conservative	Joseph-Adolphe Chapleau	1,316	64.76
Liberal	J. A. Duchesneau	716	35.24
Total valid votes		2,032	100

Quebec provincial by-election, March 12, 1873 Called upon the appointment of Joseph-Adolphe Chapleau as Solicitor General of Quebec
Party	Candidate	Votes	Elected
Conservative	Joseph-Adolphe Chapleau	acclaimed	✓

== See also ==
- List of Quebec provincial electoral districts
- Canadian provincial electoral districts
