= Jean-Pierre Saintonge =

Canadian politician

Jean-Pierre Saintonge (French pronunciation: [ʒɑ̃ pjɛʁ sɛ̃tɔ̃ʒ]; born December 6, 1945) is an educator, lawyer, judge and former political figure in Quebec. He represented La Prairie from 1981 to 1989 and La Pinière from 1989 to 1994 in the Quebec National Assembly as a Liberal.

== Biography ==
He was born in Montreal, Quebec, the son of Bernard Saintonge and Yvette Patry, and was educated at the Université de Montréal. He taught at the Collège Saint-Ignace from 1967 to 1969, at the École Saint-Léon (adult education) from 1969 to 1972 and at the Cégep Ahunstic from 1972 to 1973. Saintonge was called to the Quebec bar in 1973. He served as President of the National Assembly from 1989 to 1994. Saintonge did not run for reelection in 1994. He practiced at Dunton Rainville.

He was named judge in the Court of Quebec in 1995. Saintonge was coordinator for the Court of Quebec in the Montérégie region from 2002 to 2007.
