= Yves Blais =

Canadian politician

Yves Blais (June 5, 1931 – November 22, 1998) was a politician in the province of Quebec, Canada. He served in National Assembly of Quebec from 1981 to 1998 as a member of the Parti Québécois (PQ).

== Early life and career ==
Blais was born in Saint-Placide, Quebec and raised in Rouyn-Noranda, in the Témiscamingue area. He took classical studies at College Mont-Laurier and received a bachelor's degree in literature in 1950.

Blais worked for Hydro-Québec from 1951 to 1966, initially in land surveying and later at the installations department of the company's main office. He also studied in journalism, communications, administration, and social work in Montreal during the 1960s and opened a series of nightclubs and coffee houses, including the Patriote de Montréal, the Théâtre de Saint-Sauveur, and the Comédie nationale.

He became a Quebec nationalist in his youth and joined the Rassemblement pour l'Indépendance Nationale (RIN) on the recommendation of party leader Pierre Bourgault in the 1960s. He also rented space in his Montreal nightclub to René Lévesque, who merged his own Mouvement Souveraineté-Association with the RIN and a third group to create the Parti Québécois in 1969.

== Legislator ==
Government backbencher

Blais was elected to the Quebec legislature for the Terrebonne division in the 1981 provincial election. The Parti Québécois won a majority government in this election, and Blais entered the legislature as a backbench supporter of René Lévesque's government. He served on the party's executive during the mid-1980s.

In 1981, the federal government of Pierre Trudeau reached an agreement with all provincial premiers except Lévesque to patriate the Canadian constitution. Lévesque was not included in the final negotiations (which took place overnight at a constitutional summit in Ottawa) and described the agreement as a betrayal. In a subsequent legislative debate, Blais likened the constitutional agreement to the 1759 battle of the Plains of Abraham and compared Trudeau and the other premiers to General James Wolfe, who "climbed the banks of the Saint Lawrence in the middle of the night to attack Montcalm and his sleeping soldiers."

The PQ faced an extremely divisive internal debate as to its position on Quebec independence in 1984. Some party members favoured a hardline stance, while others sought to win increased autonomy for Quebec within the Canadian federation (a position known as the "beau risque"). Blais was not regarded as a hardliner in this period; he argued that the terms "separatist", "indépendantiste", and "sovereigntist" had different meanings and said that the PQ was "sovereigntist in a Canadian economic whole." The "beau risque" supporters won the debate (in the short term), and several of the more militant Péquistes left the party.

Blais served as parliamentary assistant to the minister of cultural communities and immigration from February 12 to October 23, 1985.

Opposition backbencher

Blais was re-elected in the 1985 provincial election as the PQ was defeated by the Quebec Liberal Party. Fe was appointed as the PQ's environment critic in the official opposition after the election. He criticized the Liberal government's passage of a law guaranteeing English-language health and social services in 1985, on the grounds that it would give Quebec's anglophone population the "hope of becoming once again a dominant minority."

Blais fell out with PQ party leader Pierre-Marc Johnson in 1987, after Johnson attempted to shift him from the environmental portfolio and subsequently dropped him from the shadow cabinet entirely. Blais subsequently became affiliated with a dissident group of legislators who opposed Johnson's leadership, and, after Johnson resigned, he supported hardline indépendantiste Jacques Parizeau's successful bid to lead the party. In the years that followed, Blais himself became more aligned the party's hardline separatist position. He was co-president of the PQ's fundraising efforts in early 1988.

He was elected to a third term in the Quebec legislature in the 1989 provincial election, running in the division of Masson after boundary changes. The Liberals were re-elected with a second consecutive majority government, and Blais was appointed as the PQ's communications critic. In 1990, he unsuccessfully called for the PQ to boycott premier Robert Bourassa's commission on Quebec's constitutional future.

Government backbencher (second time)

Blais was re-elected again in the 1994 provincial election as the PQ returned to power until Parizeau's leadership. Following the election, he was appointed as the government's regional delegate for the Outaouais. This was not a ministerial position, although Parizeau said that it would be almost equal in power.

One day after his appointment, Blais announced that he would make a decision on the location of a promised casino for the Outaouais within ten days and that the PQ government would act on his decision. The ten-day deadline was not kept, although the PQ government later approved a casino for Hull. Blais subsequently indicated that only companies with offices in Quebec would be able to work on the building's construction.

Blais campaigned in favour of Quebec sovereignty in the Outaouais region in the buildup to the 1995 provincial referendum and highlighted the need for the Parizeau government to ensure that federal civil service workers would have job security in a sovereign Quebec. In January 1995, he promised that the PQ would soon provide "irrefutable proof" that all federal civil servants would be hired by the Quebec public service in the event of Quebec sovereignty. (A representative of the Public Service Alliance of Canada responded that a promise would not suffice and demanded a signed legal document. The PSAC and the PQ government reached an agreement in principle in June.) Blais also took part in the Parizeau government's public commission on sovereignty during the same period.

He suffered a heart attack in March 1995, but was back at his desk the following week. Fellow legislator Denis Perron said as Blais, "`For him, it's Quebec before everything else. Before himself, before his health." Blais himself said, "Politics and humor are my two drugs. That's what keeps me alive. That, and the hope of having a new country very soon."

During Quebec's legislative debates on sovereignty in 1995, Blais compared Quebecers to the Jewish people in their search for a homeland, saying "We lost a war in 1760 and have been searching for a country since then." The sovereigntist side was narrowly defeated in the referendum, and Parizeau resigned as premier shortly thereafter.

When Lucien Bouchard succeeded Parizeau as premier in January 1996, one of his first decisions was to eliminate the "regional delegate" positions. He appointed Blais as parliamentary assistant to the minister responsible for regional development on January 29, 1996; Blais held this position for the remainder of his time as a legislator.

== Death ==
Blais died of a heart attack on November 22, 1998. At the time, he was seeking re-election to the Quebec legislature in the 1998 provincial election. Premier Bouchard cancelled some campaign appearances as a tribute to Blais.

== Electoral record ==
1994 Quebec general election: Masson
Party	Candidate	Votes	%	±%
Parti Québécois	Yves Blais	21,481	64.19	+4.77
Liberal	Alain Leclerc	6,991	20.89	−14.40
Action démocratique	André Beaulieu	4,388	13.11	–
Independent	Janine Larose	351	1.05	–
Natural Law	Andria Murray	255	0.76	
Total valid votes		33,466	100.00	
Rejected and declined votes		773		
Turnout		34,239	82.71	+8.92
Electors on the lists		41,397		

1989 Quebec general election: Masson
Party	Candidate	Votes	%
Parti Québécois	Yves Blais	19,615	59.42
Liberal	Micheline Croteau-René	11,648	35.29
Green	Janine Larose	1,135	3.44
New Democratic	Richard Morin	611	1.85
Total valid votes		33,009	97.45
Total rejected ballots		864	2.55
Turnout		33,873	73.79
Electors on the lists		45,904	–

1985 Quebec general election: Terrebonne
Party	Candidate	Votes	%	±%
Parti Québécois	Yves Blais	18,555	56.67	-6.58
Liberal	Jocelyn Poirier	12,877	39.33	+5.44
New Democratic	Johanne Morin	810	2.47	
United Social Credit	Jean Louis Poirier	428	1.31	
Christian Socialist	Alain Michaud	74	0.23	
Total valid votes		32,744	98.06	
Total rejected ballots		649	1.94	+0.90
Turnout		33,393	75.37	-8.63
Electors on the lists		44,308		
Parti Québécois hold		Swing		-6.01

1981 Quebec general election: Terrebonne
Party	Candidate	Votes	%	±%
Parti Québécois	Yves Blais	19,344	63.25	+12.63
Liberal	Jean-Yves Chartrand	10,363	33.88	+2.04
Union Nationale	Gabriel Desjardins	878	2.87	-10.73
Total valid votes		30,585	98.96	
Total rejected ballots		322	1.04	-0.71
Turnout		30,907	84.00	-5.48
Electors on the lists		36,794		
Parti Québécois hold		Swing		+5.30
