= Jean Leclercq =

Jean Leclercq may refer to:

- Jean Leclercq (monk) (1911–1993), Benedictine monk and author
- Jean Leclercq (politician) (1925–1970), Belgian politician and Walloon militant

== See also ==
- Jean Leclerc (disambiguation)
