= Louise Harel =

Canadian politician (born 1946)

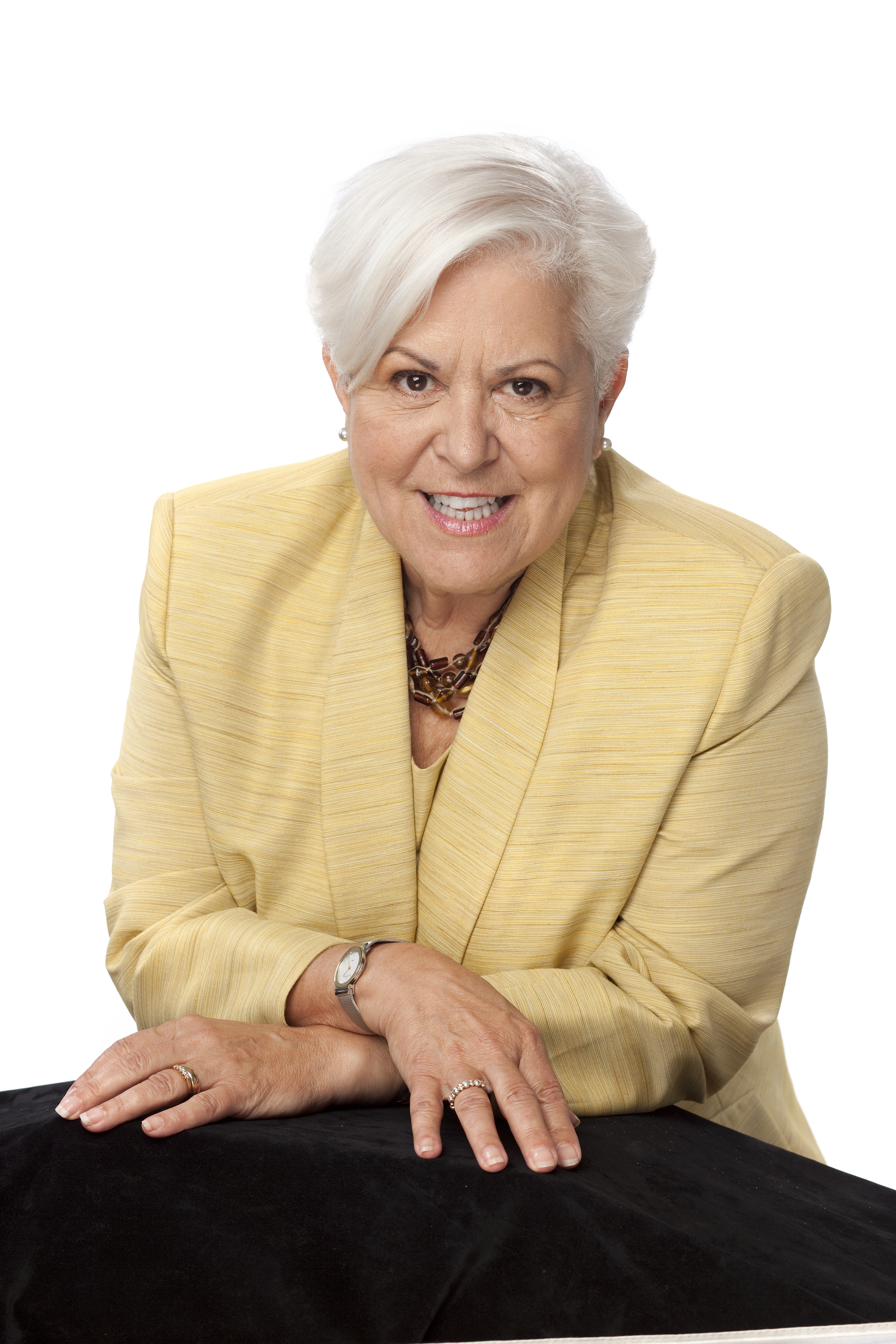

City Councillor for Maisonneuve–Longue-Pointe
- In office 2009–2013
- Preceded by: Claire St-Arnaud
- Succeeded by: Laurence Lavigne Lalonde

Leader of the Opposition of Quebec
- In office June 6, 2005 – August 21, 2006
- Preceded by: Bernard Landry
- Succeeded by: André Boisclair

Interim Leader of the Parti Québécois
- In office June 6, 2005 – November 15, 2005
- Preceded by: Bernard Landry
- Succeeded by: André Boisclair

MNA for Hochelaga-Maisonneuve
- In office September 25, 1989 – November 5, 2008
- Preceded by: First Member
- Succeeded by: Carole Poirier

MNA for Maisonneuve
- In office April 13, 1981 – September 25, 1989
- Preceded by: Georges Lalande
- Succeeded by: Riding Dissolved

Personal details
- Born: April 22, 1946 (age 80) Sainte-Thérèse-de-Blainville, Quebec
- Party: Parti Québécois; Coalition Montréal; Vision Montréal (formerly)

Louise Harel (French: [lwiz aʁɛl] ; born April 22, 1946) is a Quebec politician. In 2005 she served as interim leader of the Parti Québécois following the resignation of Bernard Landry. She was also interim leader of the opposition in the National Assembly of Quebec. She represented the riding of Hochelaga-Maisonneuve in the Montreal region, and its predecessors, from 1981 to 2008. She ran for Mayor of Montreal as the representative of the Vision Montreal municipal political party in the 2009 election, but was defeated by incumbent Gérald Tremblay. In the 2013 Montreal election, Harel supported federalist Marcel Côté for mayor but failed to be elected to her own council seat.

== Life and career ==
Harel was born in Sainte-Thérèse-de-Blainville, Quebec. She graduated in 1977 from the Université de Montréal with a law degree and was admitted to the bar in 1978. She worked at the national secretariat, the Centre des services sociaux de Montréal and the Social Development Council of Metropolitan Montreal as a staff member. She has been a member of the Parti Québécois (PQ) since 1970 and was the president of the party in Montreal-Centre in the 1970s and the vice-president of the party province wide from 1979 to 1981.

She was first elected to the National Assembly in the 1981 election as the Member of the National Assembly (MNA) for Maisonneuve. In 1984, she was appointed Minister of Cultural Communities and Immigration by Quebec Premier René Lévesque, and served until the government's electoral defeat in the 1985 election. She retained her seat that year and in 1989 (when it was renamed Hochelaga-Maisonneuve), however, and served in opposition for the next five years.

When the PQ returned to power in the 1994 election under the leadership of Jacques Parizeau, she returned to cabinet as Minister of Employment and minister responsible for immigration.

After being re-elected in 1998, she later served as Minister of Municipal Affairs. During her tenure as minister, she tabled a bill which forced the merger of several small municipalities into one entity and affected all key cities such as Gatineau, Montreal, Quebec City, Trois-Rivières, Saguenay, Longueuil and Sherbrooke. The project, which was implemented in 2002 was met with mixed reviews and later become a key issue during the 2003 provincial elections.

In 2002, she became the first woman to serve as Speaker of the National Assembly, and remained in that capacity until the 2003 election, after which she joined the PQ on the opposition benches.

Harel served as interim PQ leader and leader of the opposition until a leadership election chose André Boisclair as leader on November 15, 2005. She was not a candidate in the leadership election. She continued to serve as leader of the opposition until PQ leader André Boisclair won his seat in the National Assembly on August 14, 2006.

She was re-elected in the 2007 elections and named the PQ critic in social services and later she was also giving the portfolio of Status of Women. In October 2008, she announced that she would not seek another mandate.

=== Montreal mayoralty campaign 2009 ===
Harel ran for mayor of Montreal for the November 1, 2009 Montreal municipal election on behalf of the municipal Vision Montréal party. To that end, she studied to improve her poor English, a liability in a city where almost 20% the population is Anglophone. She has stated that the rise of "ethnic neighbourhoods" in the city is an undesirable situation, because she believes that Montrealers should feel part of the whole city, not just of their own borough. A central aspect of her campaign has been to centralize municipal government.

She came in second in the mayoralty race, and became city councillor for the district of Maisonneuve–Longue-Pointe. She announced she would remain leader of Vision Montréal and opposition leader at City Hall.

=== Montreal municipal election 2013 ===
In early July 2013, Harel allied Vision Montreal with mayoral hopeful Marcel Côté. She opted against another mayoral run in her own right after recognizing that given her massive unpopularity among anglophones it was impossible for her to become mayor.

After her own district was abolished, Harel ran for councillor in Sainte-Marie, the eastern section of Ville-Marie, but lost to Projet Montreal's Valérie Plante. Côté came a distant fourth in the mayoral race at the head of a new party called Coalition Montréal Marcel Côté.

In January 2014 Harel announced her intention to revive Vision Montreal but not to run for office again herself. She has also begun a weekly broadcast on Radio Ville-Marie.

== Electoral record ==
Sainte-Marie, Ville-Marie borough, 2013
Candidate	Party	Vote	%
Valérie Plante	Projet Montréal	2,526	32.95%
Louise Harel	Coalition Montréal	2,263	29.52%
Pierre Mainville	Independent	1,626	21.21%
Pierre Paiement	Équipe Denis Coderre	898	11.71%
Anne-Marie Gélinas	Parti Integrité Montréal	354	4.62%

2009 Montreal municipal election
Candidate	Party	Vote	%
Gérald Tremblay (incumbent)	Union Montréal	159,020	37.90%
Louise Harel	Vision Montréal	137,301	32.73%
Richard Bergeron	Projet Montréal	106,768	25.45%
Louise O'Sullivan	Parti Montréal - Ville-Marie	8,490	2.02%
Michel Bédard	Parti Fierté Montréal	5,297	1.26%
Michel Prairie	Independent	2,648	0.63%

2007 Quebec general election: Hochelaga-Maisonneuve
Party	Candidate	Votes	%	±%
Parti Québécois	Louise Harel	13,012	52.71	−3.06
Action démocratique	Marie-Chantal Pelletier	3,836	15.54	+5.14
Liberal	Vahid Vidah-Fortin	3,347	13.56	−12.80
Québec solidaire	Gabriel Chevrefils	2,388	9.67	+6.33
Green	Geneviève Guérin	1,749	7.09	+5.53
Bloc Pot	Starbuck Leroidurock	193	0.78	−1.24
Independent	Daniel Laforest	97	0.39	–
Marxist–Leninist	Christine Dandenault	63	0.26	−0.08
Total valid votes		24,685	98.58	
Total rejected ballots		355	1.42	
Turnout		25,040	62.18	+2.09
Electors on the lists		40,272		
Source: Official Results, Le Directeur général des élections du Québec.

2003 Quebec general election: Hochelaga-Maisonneuve
Party	Candidate	Votes	%	±%
Parti Québécois	Louise Harel	13,138	55.77	−4.84
Liberal	Richer Dompierre	6,210	26.36	+0.83
Action démocratique	Louise Blackburn	2,449	10.40	−1.11
UFP	Lise Alarie	788	3.34	–
Bloc Pot	Alex Néron	476	2.02	–
Green	Daniel Breton	367	1.56	–
Marxist–Leninist	Christine Dandenault	79	0.34	−0.28
Christian Democracy	Mario Richard	52	0.22	–
Total valid votes		23,559	98.40	–
Total rejected ballots		383	1.60	–
Turnout		23,942	60.09	−7.92
Electors on the lists		39,843	–	–
Source: Official Results, Le Directeur général des élections du Québec.

1998 Quebec general election: Hochelaga-Maisonneuve
Party	Candidate	Votes	%	±%
Parti Québécois	Louise Harel	12,922	60.61	−4.17
Liberal	Andrée Trudel	5,444	25.53	−0.80
Action démocratique	Jean-Louis Lalonde	2,454	11.51	+6.06
Socialist Democracy	Félix Lapan	292	1.37	−0.34
Marxist–Leninist	Christine Dandenault	133	0.62	+0.26
Communist	Robert Aubin	75	0.35	–
Total valid votes		21,320	98.41	–
Total rejected ballots		345	1.59	–
Turnout		21,665	68.01	−7.53
Electors on the lists		31,855	–	–
Source: Official Results, Le Directeur général des élections du Québec.

1994 Quebec general election: Hochelaga-Maisonneuve
Party	Candidate	Votes	%	±%
Parti Québécois	Louise Harel	14,858	64.78	+1.28
Liberal	Eric Taillefer	6,039	26.33	−2.98
Action démocratique	Michèle Piché	1,249	5.45	–
New Democratic	Hugues Tremblay	392	1.71	+0.30
Natural Law	Richard Lauzon	190	0.83	–
Sovereignty	Marc Boyer	127	0.55	–
Marxist–Leninist	Christine Dandenault	82	0.36	+0.10
Total valid votes		22,937	97.68	–
Total rejected ballots		545	2.32	–
Turnout		23,482	75.54	+6.83
Electors on the lists		31,087	–	–
Source: Official Results, Le Directeur général des élections du Québec.

1989 Quebec general election: Hochelaga-Maisonneuve
Party	Candidate	Votes	%
Parti Québécois	Louise Harel	14,639	63.50
Liberal	Yvon Lewis	6,749	29.28
Green	Jean-Pierre Bonenfant	685	2.97
New Democratic	Jocelyne Dupuis	326	1.41
Workers	Ginette St-Amour	144	0.62
Progressive Conservative	Suzanne Ethier	141	0.61
Parti indépendantiste	Michel Larocque	138	0.60
Independent	Keith Meadowcroft	114	0.49
Marxist–Leninist	Christiane Robidoux	60	0.26
Commonwealth of Canada	Daniel Ricard	56	0.24
Total valid votes		23,052	
Rejected and declined votes		548	
Turnout		23,600	68.71
Electors on the lists		34,349	

1985 Quebec general election: Maisonneuve
Party	Candidate	Votes	%	±%
Parti Québécois	Louise Harel	12,373	51.75	
Liberal	Monelle Saindon	10,285	43.02	
New Democratic	Milan Mirich	495	2.07	
Union Nationale	André Léveillé	322	1.35	–
Progressive Conservative	Morris Tremblay	138	0.58	
Humanist	Victor Riquelme	117	0.49	
Christian Socialist	Carole Dunn	76	0.32	
Communist	Montserrat Escola	52	0.22	
Independent	Nelson Dubé	49	0.20	
Total valid votes		23,907	100.00	
Rejected and declined votes		552		
Turnout		24,459	69.53	
Electors on the lists		35,176		
Source: Official Results, Le Directeur général des élections du Québec.

== See also ==
- Parti Québécois Crisis, 1984

Political offices
Preceded by Jean-Pierre Charbonneau	President of the National Assembly; 2002-03-12 – 2003-06-04	Succeeded by Michel Bissonnet
Preceded by Bernard Landry	Leader of the Parti Québécois; Interim; 2005	Succeeded by André Boisclair
Preceded by Bernard Landry	Leader of the Opposition in Quebec; 2005-06-06 – 2006-08-21	Succeeded by André Boisclair
Preceded by	Minister of Employment; 1994–1998	Succeeded by Diane Lemieux
Preceded by Remy Trudel	Minister of Municipal Affairs; 1998–2003	Succeeded by Andre Boisclair
Preceded by Benoit Labonté	Leader of Vision Montréal; 2009–2014	Succeeded by None
Preceded by Benoit Labonté	Leader the Opposition, Montreal City Council; 2009–2013	Succeeded by Richard Bergeron
Preceded by Claire St-Arnaud	City Councillor, Maisonneuve–Longue-Pointe; 2009–2013	Succeeded by Laurence Lavigne Lalonde
