= Union des forces progressistes candidates in the 2003 Quebec provincial election =

The Union des forces progressistes fielded seventy-four candidates in the 2003 Quebec provincial election, none of whom were elected. Information about these candidates may be found on this page.

== Candidates ==
(n.c.: no candidate)

Riding	Candidate's name	Gender	Votes	%	Rank
Abitibi-Est	n.c.				
Abitibi-Ouest	n.c.				
Acadie	n.c.				
Anjou	n.c.				
Argenteuil	n.c.				
Arthabaska	n.c.				
Beauce-Nord	Richard Fecteau	M	175	0.60	5th
Beauce-Sud	Ginette Lewis	F	216	0.67	4th
Beauharnois	n.c.				
Bellechasse	Mario Ouellette	M	134	0.52	5th
Berthier	Pierre Gravel	M	632	1.83	4th
Bertrand	n.c.				
Blainville	Thérèse Hamel	F	394	1.10	4th
Bonaventure	n.c.				
Borduas	n.c.				
Bourassa-Sauvé	n.c.				
Bourget	Rosanne Labelle	F	418	1.26	5th
Brome-Missisquoi	Simon Gnocchini	M	509	1.53	4th
Chambly	n.c.				
Champlain	Lucie Favreau	F	103	0.39	5th
Chapleau	Jean Marois	M	331	1.10	5th
Notes: Jean Marois received 331 votes (1.10%), finishing fifth against Liberal incumbent Benoît Pelletier.
Charlesbourg	Simon Carreau	M	329	0.85	5th
Charlevoix	Éric Tremblay	M	168	0.72	4th
Châteauguay	Guylaine Sirard	F	222	0.56	5th
Notes: Guylaine Sirard has worked in support of legal abortion rights. She was a candidate for the Parti de la démocratie socialiste in the 1998 provincial election and for the UFP 2003. Electoral record: Election / Division / Party / Votes / % / Place / Winner; 1998 provincial / Mercier / Parti de la démocratie socialiste / 873 / 2.75 / 5/9 / Robert Perreault, Parti Québécois; 2003 provincial / Taschereau / Union des forces progressistes / 222 / 0.56 / 5/6 / Jean-Marc Fournier, Liberal
Chauveau	Marie-Noëlle Béland	F	387	1.05	5th
Chicoutimi	Pierre Dostie	M	670	2.02	4th
Notes: Pierre Dostie was one of the two spokespersons of UFP from 2002 to 2004. He was also a candidate for Québec solidaire in the same riding in the 2012 election.
Chomedey	n.c.				
Chutes-de-la-Chaudière	Jean Bernatchez	M	649	1.71	4th
Crémazie	Jocelyne Desautels	F	686	1.96	4th
Notes: Jocelyne Desautels was also a candidate for the Parti de la démocratie socialiste in Mille-Îles in the 1998 election.
D'Arcy-McGee	n.c.				
Deux-Montagnes	Julien Demers	M	408	1.28	4th
Drummond	Gilles Martineau	M	301	0.81	5th
Dubuc	Marie Francine Bienvenue	F	457	1.82	4th
Duplessis	n.c.				
Fabre	n.c.				
Frontenac	'Marie-Josée Vachon	F	125	0.48	5th
Gaspé	n.c.				
Gatineau	Julie Mercier	F	423	1.56	4th
Gouin	Colette Provost	F	1,397	4.69	4th
Groulx	Denis Letourneux	M	436	1.25	4th
Hochelaga-Maisonneuve	Lise Alarie	F	788	3.34	4th
Notes: Lise Alarie received 788 votes (3.34%), finishing fourth against Parti Québécois incumbent Louise Harel.
Hull	Denise Veilleux	F	677	2.38	4th
Huntingdon	n.c.				
Iberville	Guillaume Tremblay	M	229	0.74	6th
Îles-de-la-Madeleine	n.c.				
Jacques-Cartier	n.c.				
Jean-Lesage	n.c.				
Jeanne-Mance–Viger	n.c.				
Jean-Talon	Sacha Alcide Calixte	M	515	1.52	4th
Johnson	Martin Marois	M	343	1.14	4th
Joliette	Mathieu Lessard	M	1,149	346	4th
Jonquière	Michel Perron	M	330	1.06	5th
Kamouraska-Témiscouata	n.c.				
Labelle	n.c.				
Lac-Saint-Jean	n.c.				
LaFontaine	n.c.				
La Peltrie	Guillaume Boivin	M	515	1.30	5th
Notes: Guillaume Boivin was also the candidate for the Parti de la démocratie socialiste in the same riding in the 1998 election.
La Pinière	n.c.				
Laporte	Christian Montmarquette	M	489	1.45	4th
Laprairie	Danielle Maire	F	229	0.60	5th
L'Assomption	Gilbert Morin	M	356	0.91	5th
Laurier-Dorion	William Sloan	M	922	3.05	4th
Laval-des-Rapides	n.c.				
Laviolette	Yves Demers	M	182	0.75	4th
Lévis	Madeleine Provencher	F	442	1.20	4th
Lotbinière	Étienne Hallé	M	175	0.69	5th
Louis-Hébert	Jean-Philippe Lessard-Beaupré	M	402	1.00	5th
Marguerite-Bourgeoys	n.c.				
Marguerite-D'Youville	Maxime Babeu	M	536	1.36	5th
Marie-Victorin	Marc Lambert	M	452	1.61	5th
Marquette	n.c.				
Maskinongé	n.c.				
Masson	n.c.				
Matane	n.c.				
Matapédia	n.c.				
Mégantic-Compton	Christian Poulin	M	193	0.82	4th
Mercier	Amir Khadir	M	5,278	17.92	3rd
Mille-Îles	n.c.				
Mirabel	n.c.				
Montmagny-L'Islet	Fernand Dorval	M	225	0.97	4th
Montmorency	Magali Paquin	F	517	1.39	4th
Mont-Royal	n.c.				
Nelligan	n.c.				
Nicolet-Yamaska	n.c.				
Notre-Dame-de-Grâce	n.c.				
Orford	Véronique Grenier	F	498	1.42	4th
Notes: Véronique Grenier was a student at the Cégep de Sherbrooke during the election. The UFP was not well-organized in the region, and she did not run an active campaign. She received 498 votes (1.42%), finishing fourth against Liberal candidate Pierre Reid. Grenier later attended the Université de Sherbrooke.
Outremont	Jill Hanley		1,818	6.86	3rd
Papineau	Dominique Marceau		286	0.93	5th
Pointe-aux-Trembles	n.c.				
Pontiac	Serge Tanguay	M	392	1.68	4th
Portneuf	François Paradis-Caron	M	413	1.28	4th
Prévost	n.c.				
René-Lévesque	n.c.				
Richelieu	n.c.				
Richmond	n.c.				
Rimouski	n.c.				
Rivière-du-Loup	n.c.				
Robert-Baldwin	n.c.				
Roberval	Francis Breton	M	453	1.49	4th
Rosemont	Omar Aktouf	M	1,132	3.07	4th
Notes: Omar Aktouf is a professor of management at HEC Montréal. He was born in 1944 near Sétif, in Petite Kabylie, Algeria. His father was exiled from Algeria by the colonial authorities and the family settled in Safi, Morocco. In 1962, after the independence of Algeria, the family resettled in Algiers. In Algiers, Omar Aktouf obtained diplomas in literature, philosophy and economics. He then worked in the Algerian public sector, successively at Sonatrach, at the ministry of hydraulics, at the Société nationale des eaux and at the Société nationale de géophysique. He immigrated to Montréal. In the 1980s he became professor at HEC Montréal. In the 2003 Quebec election, he was candidate for the Union des forces progressistes in Rosemont. He obtained 1,132 votes (3.07%), placing fourth. In the 2004 federal election, he was candidate for the New democratic Party in Outremont. He obtained 5,382 votes (14,06%), placing third. At HEC, he is member of Groupe d'études et de recherche sur le management et l'environnement (GERME) and founding member of Centre humanismes, gestions et mondialisation. He is the author of books, including Le management entre tradition et renouvellement, éd. Gaëtan Morin, 4th edition, 2005; La stratégie de l'autruche; post-mondialisation, management et rationalité économique, Écosociété, 2002; Méthodologie des sciences sociales et approche qualitative des organisations, Presses des H.E.C. et Presses de l'Université du Québec, 1987.
Rousseau	Alex Boisdequin-Lefort	M	324	1.10	4th
Rouyn-Noranda–Témiscamingue	Patrick Rancourt	M	507	1.79	4th
Sainte-Marie–Saint-Jacques	Gaétan Breton	M	1,699	6.48	4th
Notes: Gaétan Breton is professor of accounting at Université du Québec à Montréal. He was born in 1952 in Amos. He obtained a doctorate in accounting at the City University London and a master in French studies at Université de Sherbrooke. He is active in environmental and social groups. He was candidate for the Union des forces progressistes in Sainte-Marie–Saint-Jacques in the 2003 Quebec general election and in Gouin in the 2004 by-election, where he obtained 1,195 votes (7,97%), placing third.
Saint-François	Suzanne Thériault	F	314	0.99	4th
Saint-Henri–Sainte-Anne	Marc-André Payette	M	595	1.97	4th
Saint-Hyacinthe	François Choquette	M	401	1.14	4th
Saint-Jean	Alexandre Boulerice	M	535	1.48	4th
Saint-Laurent	Alain Pérusse	M	325	1.02	4th
Saint-Maurice	Kevin Trudel	M	225	0.88	4th
Shefford	Gilles Dumoulin	M	334	0.94	5th
Sherbrooke	Normand Gilbert	M	496	1.42	4th
Soulanges	n.c.				
Taillon	Gabriel Landry	M	545	1.42	5th
Taschereau	Alain Marcoux	M	1,176	3.54	4th
Notes: Alain Marcoux was a candidate for the Parti de la démocratie socialiste in the 1998 provincial election and for the UFP 2003. In April 2003, he highlighted the UFP's role in mobilizing protests against the American-led invasion of Iraq. Electoral record: Election / Division / Party / Votes / % / Place / Winner; 1998 provincial / Taschereau / Parti de la démocratie socialiste / 521 / 2.16 / 4/7 / Agnès Maltais, Parti Québécois; 2003 provincial / Taschereau / Union des forces progressistes / 1,176 / 3.54 / 4/8 / Agnès Maltais, Parti Québécois
Terrebonne	Marco Legrand	M	440	1.24	4th
Trois-Rivières	David Lanneville	M	214	0.79	5th
Ungava	n.c.				
Vachon	Richard St-Onge	M	279	0.87	5th
Vanier	Sébastien Bouchard	M	573	1.52	4th
Notes: Sébastien Bouchard was also candidate for the Parti de la démocratie socialiste in Jean-Talon in the 1998 general election and candidate for Québec solidaire in Chauveau in the 2012 general election.
Vaudreuil	n.c.				
Verchères	Marc-André Morvan	M	195	0.63	5th
Verdun	Pascal Durand	M	368	1.27	5th
Viau	Jocelyne Dupuis	F	384	1.41	5th
Notes: Jocelyne Dupuis was also candidate for the New Democratic Party of Quebec - Parti de la démocratie socialiste in Hochelaga-Maisonneuve in 1989, in Sainte-Marie–Saint-Jacques in 1994 and in L'Assomption in the 1996 by-election. She led the NDPQ-PDS in 1994-1996.
Vimont	André Pigeon	M	269	0.70	5th
Westmount	David Fennario	M	718	3.14	4th

== See also ==
- For one of the predecessor parties: Category:New Democratic Party of Quebec candidates in Quebec provincial elections
- For the successor party: Category:Québec solidaire candidates in Quebec provincial elections
