= Jean Leclerc =

Jean Leclerc or Le Clerc may refer to:

- Jean Le Clerc (c.1440–1510), French official who wrote two chronicles about the life of his longstanding patron Antoine de Chabannes
- Jean LeClerc (painter) (c.1585–1633), French painter
- Jean Le Clerc (theologian) (1657–1736), biblical scholar and encyclopaedist
- Jean Théophile Victor Leclerc (1771–1796), radical French revolutionist and newspaperman
- Jean LeClerc (actor) (born 1948), Québécois actor best known for appearing in the American soap opera All My Children
- Jean Leclerc (politician) (born 1958), Canadian politician and businessman
- Jean Leclerc (born 1961), Québécois singer better known as Jean Leloup

== See also ==
- Jean Leclercq (disambiguation)
