= Catherine Dorion =

Quebec artist and former politician

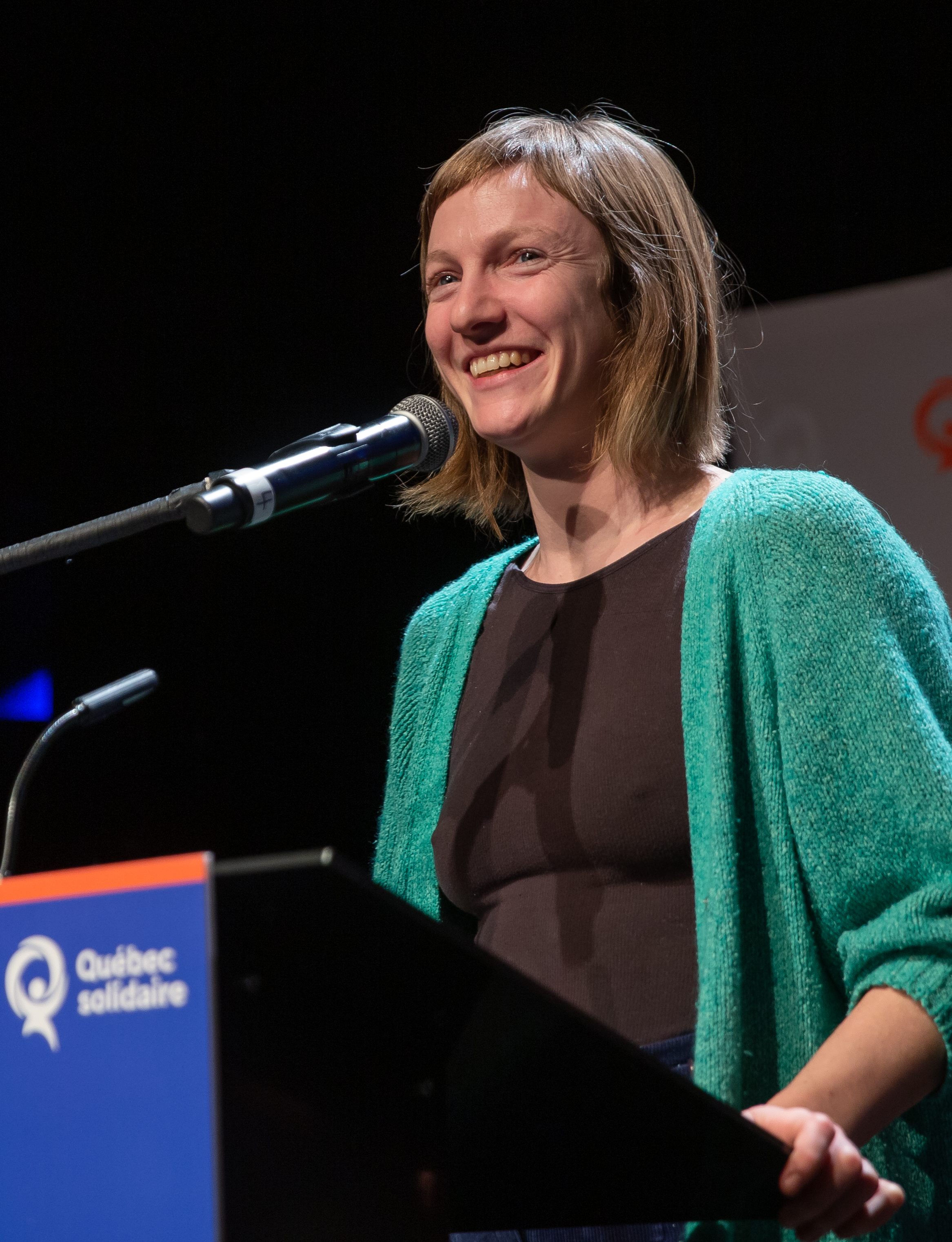
- Catherine Dorion, December 2018

Member of the National Assembly of Quebec for Taschereau
- In office October 1, 2018 – August 28, 2022
- Preceded by: Agnès Maltais
- Succeeded by: Étienne Grandmont

Personal details
- Born: September 30, 1982 (age 43) Quebec City, Quebec, Canada
- Party: Québec solidaire (2018–present)
- Other political affiliations: Option nationale (2011–2017)
- Relations: Noël Dorion (grandfather) Henri Dorion (uncle)
- Children: 3
- Education: King's College London; Université du Québec à Montréal; Conservatoire de musique et d'art dramatique du Québec
- Profession: Politician, actress, comedian, artist, writer

Catherine Dorion is a Canadian artist, author, and former politician from Quebec City. She was elected to the National Assembly of Quebec in the 2018 provincial election., and represented the electoral district of Taschereau as a member of Québec solidaire (QS) from 2018 to 2022.

== Biography ==
Dorion was born in Quebec City in 1982. Her father, Louis Dorion, who died in 1998, was a lawyer from Quebec City; her mother, Claudette Brasseur, was a court reporter. She grew up in the Saint-Jean-Baptiste neighbourhood of Quebec City and was the last of nine children. Her mother raised her by herself; her father having left the family when Dorion was a year old. Her grandfather was Noël Dorion, a Progressive Conservative (PC) Member of Parliament (MP) for Bellechasse riding. Her uncle was the geographer and academic Henri Dorion. She has three daughters.

Dorion is a graduate of the Conservatoire de musique et d'art dramatique du Québec. She also received a bachelor's degree in International Relations and International Law from Université du Québec à Montréal, in 2009, and a master's degree from the Department of War Studies (International Relations) from King's College London, in 2010. She also studied in Chile, Russia and Spain and travelled in more than 30 countries.

She has been living in the Limoilou neighbourhood since 2014.

== Career ==
=== Acting ===
As an actress, Dorion has performed in several television dramas and theatre productions, including L'Auberge du chien noir. Her performance in Amélie Nothomb's Fuels at the Théâtre du Trident, earned her the 2007 Prix Révélation of the Year Award at the Gala des Masques.

She also performs slam poetry and has won several competitions.

She wrote and produced the theater show FUCK TOUTE (2016) and acted in the European tour of The NoShow (2015 and 2017).

In 2025 and 2026 she tours her show "Sciences Po 101", a 90-minute documentary where the artist calls on their audience to resist the repression of power.

=== Writing ===
She was a columnist at the Carrefour de Québec (2012–2016) and at Update - Québec (2016). She also collaborated on a literary show for Radio-Canada (2015) and has written blogs for Le Journal de Montréal and Le Journal de Québec (2016–2018).

In 2014, she publishes the collection of poems Même s'il fait noir comme dans le cul d'un ours (2014).

In 2017, she publishes the essay Les luttes fécondes. Libérer le désir en amour et en politique, where she discusses the revolutionary potential of desire, which, left free, is for her a means of deconstructing institutions.

In 2017, she publishes the youth novel Ce qui se passe dehors, which tells the story of high school students in Quebec who engage in politics.

In 2023, she publishes the memoir "Les têtes brûlées" about her years as a deputy in the National Assembly, the collective crisis of meaning, and the need for community.

=== Politics ===
Dorion was elected as Member of the National Assembly (MNA) for Taschereau, October 1, 2018, as the candidate for Québec Solidaire.

During her four-year term, Dorion is a media-savvy political figure. Her style of dress and her way of expressing herself at the National Assembly are subject to criticism from certain elected officials and commentators, who describe her as a symbol of left-wing populism. Several of her videos have accumulated over a million views on social media, including her first speech in the National Assembly about loneliness and her vlog about the emptiness of the answers given by ministers of the government.

On November 8, 2019, Dorion is pressured out of the Blue Room of the Legislative Assembly of Quebec following complaints over her clothes. Examples of her wardrobe included t-shirts and Doc Martens shoes and an orange hoodie that drew criticism previously. This episode follows the publication, on Halloween day, of a photo where she appears dressed in a suit, presenting herself as costumed as a "member of parliament", a nose thumb to the widespread criticism she had received from the media regarding her appearance since her election.

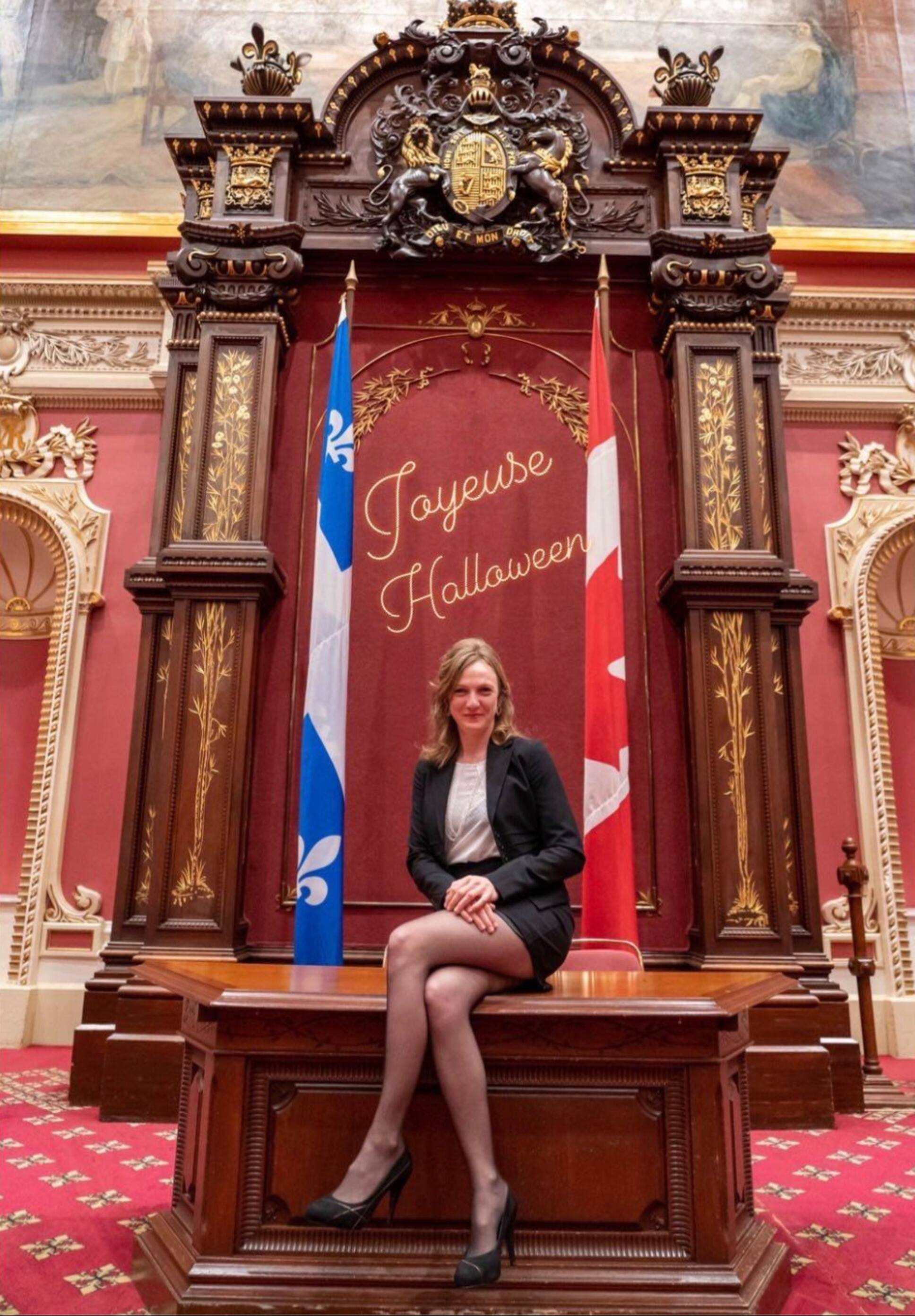
Catherine Dorion's Halloween Photo, MNA disguise, 2019

During her term, she gets involved in several issues: the denunciation of hate speech in certain media, the mobilisation against the project of a highway link between the two sides of the St. Lawrence River, the improvement of working conditions for artists, the independence of news media and support for the Quebec City tramway project.

As part of the initiative mandate on the future of media, she confronts Pierre-Karl Péladeau, CEO of Quebecor in a parliamentary committee regarding media concentration and working conditions in his media companies.

On April 1, 2022, she announced she wasn't running for re-election in the 2022 election.

On November 13, 2023, she released a memoir about her experience as MP, the price she paid for doing politics differently, and internal party tensions, which received extensive media coverage.

=== Books ===
- Dorion, Catherine (2017). Les luttes fécondes : libérer le désir en amour et en politique. Documents (Atelier 10 (Organisme)); 11 [49] (in French). Montréal (Québec): Atelier 10. p. 109. ISBN 9782897592684.
- Dorion, Catherine (2018). Ce qui se passe dehors (in French). Montréal (Québec): Hurtubise. ISBN 9782897811235. OCLC 1033517068.
- Dorion, Catherine (2023). Les Têtes brûlées : carnets d'espoir punk (in French). Montréal (Québec): Lux Editeur. ISBN 9782898330063.
- Dorion, Catherine (2026). Le courage et la joie : Traverser la tempête fasciste sans perdre le Nord (in French). Montréal (Québec): Lux Editeur. ISBN 9782898332715.

== Electoral record ==
2018 Quebec general election: Taschereau
Party	Candidate	Votes	%	±%
Québec solidaire	Catherine Dorion	15,373	42.52	+27.23
Coalition Avenir Québec	Svetlana Solomykina	6,862	18.98	+2.58
Liberal	Florent Tanlet	6,387	17.66	-12.74
Parti Québécois	Diane Lavallée	6,379	17.64	-14.02
Green	Élisabeth Grégoire	534	1.48	
Parti nul	Nicolas Pouliot	201	0.56	-0.51
New Democratic	Roger Duguay	196	0.54	
Citoyens au pouvoir	Christian Lavoie	152	0.42	
Équipe Autonomiste	Guy Boivin	73	0.20	+0.06
Total valid votes		36,157	98.82	
Total rejected ballots		431	1.18	
Turnout		36,588	73.74	
Eligible voters		49,619		
Québec solidaire gain from Parti Québécois		Swing		+12.33
Source(s) "Rapport des résultats officiels du scrutin". Élections Québec.

2014 Quebec general election
Party	Candidate	Votes	%	±%
Parti Québécois	Agnès Maltais	11,376	31.66	-5.40
Liberal	Florent Tanlet	10,925	30.40	+4.72
Coalition Avenir Québec	Steve Brabant	5,865	16.32	-0.39
Québec solidaire	Marie-Ève Duchesne	5,495	15.29	+3.60
Option nationale	Catherine Dorion	1,513	4.21	-3.22
Parti nul	Jean-Luc Savard	385	1.07	+0.12
Conservative	Anne Deblois	198	0.55	–
Parti des sans Parti	Sylvain Drolet	127	0.35	–
Équipe Autonomiste	Guy Boivin	49	0.14	-0.05
Total valid votes		35,933	98.72	–
Total rejected ballots		466	1.28	–
Turnout		36,399	73.41	-3.96
Electors on the lists		49,582	–	–

2012 Quebec general election
Party	Candidate	Votes	%	±%
Parti Québécois	Agnès Maltais	13,994	37.06	-7.16
Liberal	Clément Gignac	9,697	25.68	-3.80
Coalition Avenir Québec	Mario Asselin	6,311	16.71	+3.32*
Québec solidaire	Serge Roy	4,416	11.69	+3.27
Option nationale	Catherine Dorion	2,804	7.43	–
Parti nul	Jean-Luc Savard	358	0.95	–
Coalition pour la constituante	François Tremblay	110	0.29	–
Équipe Autonomiste	Guy Boivin	72	0.19	–
Total valid votes		37,762	98.91	–
Total rejected ballots		418	1.09	–
Turnout		38,180	77.37	+20.41
Electors on the lists		49,350	–	–

* Result compared to Action démocratique du Québec.

== Bibliography ==
- 2008: Quand le sage pointe la lune, le fou regarde le doigt, co-author of the company Soucide collective. Directed by Marc Doré at the Théâtre Périscope (Québec).
- 2009: Viva Pinoshit, directed by Olivier Lépine at Théâtre Premier Acte (Québec).
- 2010: Kounadia, story presented in the play We are made (like rats), by the company of pensive Biches. Directed by Alexia Burger at the Cinémathèque québécoise (Montreal).
- 2011: Kukipik, a clown theater, co-author of the company Soucide collectif. Directed by Marc Doré at Théâtre Premier Acte (Québec).
- 2011: Two texts in J'aurais voté oui mais j'étais trop petit, Editas.
- 2011-function. : several articles in the journals Liberté, Relations, Quebec Journal of International Law, Public Ethics, National Action, Qui vive, as well as in major Quebec dailies.
- 2012: "Le lieu collectif", in "Notre indépendance", Stanké.
- 2012: NOUS?, monologue presented by the Moulin des lyres collective.
- 2014: Même s'il fait noir comme dans le cul d'un ours, poetry, Cornac.
- 2017: Les luttes fécondes. Libérer le désir en amour et en politique, Workshops 10, Canadian Essays category.
- 2018: Ce qui se passe dehors, youth novel, Hurtubise.
