= Alexandre Leduc =

Canadian politician

Alexandre Leduc MNA
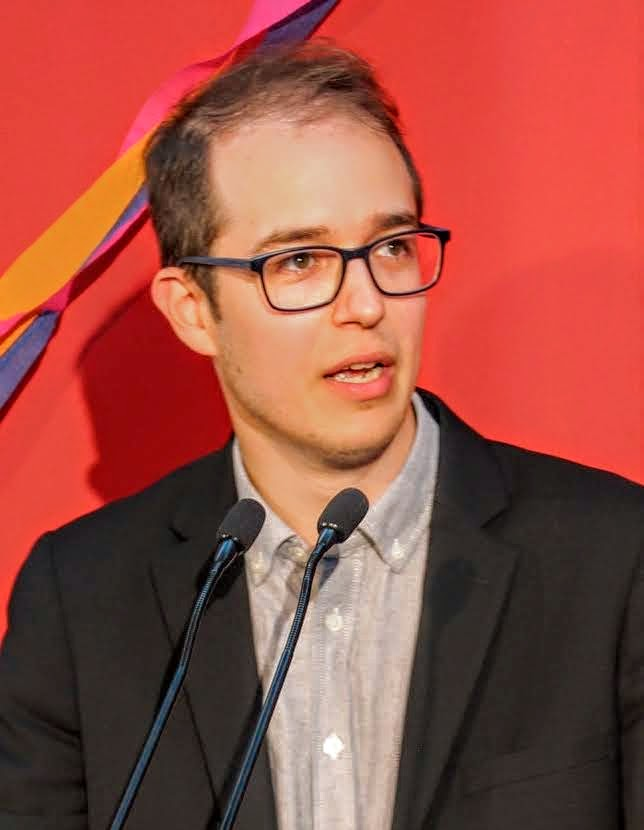
- Alexandre Leduc at the launch of his 2018 campaign

Member of the National Assembly of Quebec for Hochelaga-Maisonneuve
- Incumbent
- Assumed office October 18, 2018
- Preceded by: Carole Poirier

Personal details
- Born: August 15, 1984 (age 42) Longueuil, Quebec, Canada
- Party: Québec solidaire
- Education: Université du Québec à Montréal; Cégep Édouard-Montpetit
- Profession: Union leader

Alexandre Leduc is a Canadian politician, who was elected to the National Assembly of Quebec in the 2018 provincial election. He represents the electoral district of Hochelaga-Maisonneuve as a member of Québec solidaire.

Following the 2022 provincial election, he became parliamentary leader of the solidaire caucus. He was also chosen to lead issues related to Labour, Employment, Higher Education and Secularism.

== Background ==
Leduc worked as a teaching assistant and historian while studying at the Université du Québec à Montréal. Prior to being elected in 2018, Leduc served as an advisor to the Public Service Alliance of Canada, and later the Québec Federation of Labour (FTQ).

== Electoral record ==
2022 Quebec general election: Hochelaga-Maisonneuve
Party	Candidate	Votes	%	±%
Québec solidaire	Alexandre Leduc	12,784	50.84	+0.79
Coalition Avenir Québec	Rebecca McCann	4,728	18.8	+5.91
Parti Québécois	Stephan Fogaing	4,015	15.97	-7.92
Liberal	Line Flore Tchetmi	1,957	7.78	-2.56
Conservative	Louise Poudrier	1,161	4.62	+4.01
Green	Wejden Chouchene	337	1.34	–
Climat Québec	James Strayer	84	0.33	–
Marxist–Leninist	Christine Dandenault	78	0.31	+0.12
Total valid votes		25,144	98,75	
Total rejected ballots		319	1,25	
Turnout		25,436	62.56	
Electors on the lists		40,699		

2018 Quebec general election: Hochelaga-Maisonneuve
Party	Candidate	Votes	%	±%
Québec solidaire	Alexandre Leduc	13,389	50.05	+18.26
Parti Québécois	Carole Poirier	6,310	23.59	-11.27
Coalition Avenir Québec	Sarah Beaumier	3,447	12.89	+0.94
Liberal	Julien Provencher-Proulx	2,766	10.34	-7.69
New Democratic	Eric-Abel Baland	337	1.26	–
Bloc Pot	Etienne Mallette	170	0.64	-0.06
Conservative	Mathieu Beaudoin	164	0.61	–
Citoyens au pouvoir	Gabriel Boily	117	0.44	–
Marxist–Leninist	Christine Dandenault	52	0.19	-0.05
Total valid votes		26,752	98.28	
Total rejected ballots		467	1.72	
Turnout		27,219	63.40	-0.29
Eligible voters		42,934		
Québec solidaire gain from Parti Québécois		Swing		+14.77
Source(s) "Rapport des résultats officiels du scrutin". Élections Québec.

2014 Quebec general election: Hochelaga-Maisonneuve
Party	Candidate	Votes	%	±%
Parti Québécois	Carole Poirier	9,038	34.86	-10.24
Québec solidaire	Alexandre Leduc	7,926	30.57	+6.88
Liberal	David Provencher	4,675	18.03	+6.50
Coalition Avenir Québec	Brendan Walsh	3,097	11.95	-0.65
Green	Malcolm Lewis-Richmond	352	1.36	-0.24
Option nationale	Simon Marchand	316	1.22	-2.73
Parti nul	Justin Canning	278	1.07	+0.50
Bloc Pot	Étienne Mallette	182	0.7	–
Marxist–Leninist	Christine Dandenault	61	0.24	-0.06
Total valid votes		25,925	98.31	–
Total rejected ballots		447	1.69	–
Turnout		26,372	63.69	-6.39
Electors on the lists		41,405	–	–
Parti Québécois hold		Swing		-8.56

2012 Quebec general election: Hochelaga-Maisonneuve
Party	Candidate	Votes	%	±%
Parti Québécois	Carole Poirier	12,754	45.10	-9.21
Québec solidaire	Alexandre Leduc	6,701	23.69	+10.76
Coalition Avenir Québec	David Monette	3,564	12.60	+5.88*
Liberal	Alexandre Farley	3,262	11.53	-9.69
Option nationale	André Lamy	1,116	3.95	–
Green	Nicholas Kulak	453	1.60	-2.61
Parti nul	Denis Poulin	162	0.57	–
Coalition pour la constituante	Jean-François Jetté	145	0.51	–
Marxist–Leninist	Christine Dandenault	84	0.30	-0.30
Parti indépendantiste	Serge Provost	40	0.14	–
Total valid votes		28,281	98.66	–
Total rejected ballots		385	1.34	–
Turnout		28,666	70.08	+22.26
Electors on the lists		40,907	–	–
