= Étienne Grandmont =

Canadian politician

Étienne Grandmont MNA
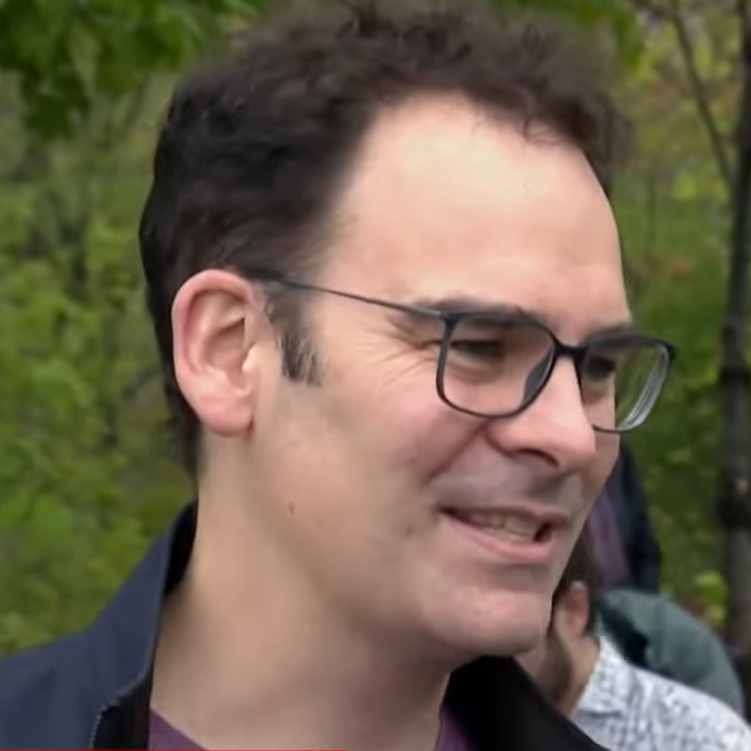
- Grandmont during an interview in 2025

Member of the National Assembly of Quebec for Taschereau
- Incumbent
- Assumed office October 3, 2022
- Preceded by: Catherine Dorion

Personal details
- Born: 1977 Trois-Rivières, Quebec
- Party: Québec solidaire
- Education: Université Laval; Université du Québec à Montréal; Cégep de Sainte-Foy

Étienne Grandmont is a Canadian politician, who was elected to the National Assembly of Quebec in the 2022 Quebec general election. He represents the riding of Taschereau as a member of Québec solidaire.

Following his election to the National Assembly in 2022, he became the opposition critic for Transport and Sustainable Mobility, Infrastructure, Municipal Affairs, Regional Development, and Tourism.

== Electoral record ==
2026 Quebec general election: Taschereau
** Preliminary results — Not yet official **
Party	Candidate	Votes	%	±%
Québec solidaire	Étienne Grandmont	15,020	41.77	
Parti Québécois	Christian Savard	9,081	25.25	
Liberal	Farnell Morisset	5,043	14.02	
Conservative	Eliot Estévez-Verville	4,140	11.51	
Coalition Avenir Québec	Brigitte Martin	2,378	6.61	
Climat Québec	Jean-François Joubert	143	0.40	
Independent	Patrick Kerr	121	0.34	
Équipe Autonomiste	Guy Boivin	36	0.10	
Total valid votes				
Total rejected ballots				
Turnout			74.44	
Electors on the lists			–	–
Québec solidaire hold		Swing		
Source: Élections Québec

2022 Quebec general election: Taschereau
Party	Candidate	Votes	%	±%
Québec solidaire	Étienne Grandmont	13,588	39.53	-2.99
Parti Québécois	Jeanne Robin	7,757	22.57	+4.93
Coalition Avenir Québec	Pascale St-Hilaire	7,537	21.93	+2.95
Conservative	Marie-Josée Hélie	3,012	8.76	–
Liberal	Ahmed Lamine Touré	2,025	5.89	-11.77
Green	Andrew Karim	225	0.65	-0.83
Climat Québec	Jean-François Joubert	102	0.30	–
Independent	Marie-Soleil Fillion	83	0.24	–
Équipe Autonomiste	Guy Boivin	41	0.12	-0.08
Total valid votes		34,570	99.33	–
Total rejected ballots		321	0.67	-0.51
Turnout		34,891	72.28	-1.46
Electors on the lists		47,996	–	–
