= Florence Ievers =

Canadian attorney

- Citizenship: Canadian
- Occupation: Lawyer

Florence Ievers is a Canadian attorney, who has had a career as a public servant. Between 1997 and 2007 she was nominated and affirmed as the Canadian Coordinator of Status of Women each year. The position is not a political appointment but requires nomination by a minister.

== Career ==
In 2002, she was elected as Vice President of the Inter-American Commission of Women and served from 2003 to 2005. Between 11 and 15 July 2002, Ievers and others attended the Global Summit of Women, held in Barcelona, Spain, as part of a delegation to evaluate how governments can better target support and aid to women's business and trade initiatives. She stood for the 1984 elections as a Liberal Candidate for MP of Langelier, Quebec, losing to Michel Coté. Between 1982 and 1984 Ievers worked in the Prime Minister Pierre Trudeau's office and as nominations secretary and later coordinated the government's plan for women. Previously, she had run in the 1981 election for the Taschereau District and was also defeated.
