= Richard Guay (politician) =

Canadian politician

Richard Guay (born November 15, 1943) is a journalist, lawyer and former political figure in Quebec. He represented Taschereau in the Quebec National Assembly from 1976 to 1985 as a member of the Parti Québécois.

== Biography ==
He was born in Montreal, the son of Maurice Guay and Irène Brassard, and was educated at the Collège Stanislas, the Collège Brébeuf and the Université de Montréal. Guay was called to the Quebec bar in 1968. He was a journalist at Radio-Canada from 1966 to 1969 and correspondent for Radio Canada at the United Nations from 1969 to 1971. Guay taught journalism in Africa from 1971 to 1973 for the Canadian International Development Agency. He was employed by the Quebec Department of Communications from 1973 to 1975 and by the Department of Cultural Affairs from 1975 to 1976. Guay served as President of the National Assembly from 1983 to 1985. He was defeated by Jean Leclerc when he ran for reelection in 1985. Guay served as Quebec's delegate-general in London from 1995 to 1999 and in Brussels from 1999 to 2001.
