= Hochelaga-Maisonneuve (provincial electoral district) =

Provincial electoral district in Quebec, Canada

Coordinates: 45.552°N 73.541°W

Quebec electoral district
- Location in Montreal

Provincial electoral district
- Legislature: National Assembly of Quebec
MNA
Alexandre Leduc
Québec solidaire
- District created: 1988
- First contested: 1989
- Last contested: 2026

Demographics
- Population (2016): 58,295
- Electors (2018): 42,934
- Area (km²): 9.9
- Pop. density (per km²): 5,888.4
- Census division: Montreal
- Census subdivision: Montreal

Hochelaga-Maisonneuve (French pronunciation: [ɔʃlaɡa mɛzɔ̃nœv]) is a provincial electoral district in Quebec, Canada, that elects members to the National Assembly of Quebec. The district is located within Montreal, and its territory mostly covers the borough of Mercier–Hochelaga-Maisonneuve, and also parts of Rosemont–La Petite-Patrie, Ville-Marie, and Le Plateau-Mont-Royal boroughs. It is bordered to the east by the Canadian National Railway yard, to the south by the Saint Lawrence River, to the north by Rachel and Sherbrooke Streets and to the west by Frontenac Street.

It was created for the 1989 election from parts of Maisonneuve and Sainte-Marie electoral districts.

In the change from the 2001 to the 2011 electoral map, its territory was unchanged.

== Members of the National Assembly ==
Legislature	Years	Member	Party
Riding created from Maisonneuve and Sainte-Marie
34th	1989–1994	Louise Harel	Parti Québécois
35th	1994–1998	Louise Harel	Parti Québécois
36th	1998–2003	Louise Harel	Parti Québécois
37th	2003–2007	Louise Harel	Parti Québécois
38th	2007–2008	Louise Harel	Parti Québécois
39th	2008–2012	Carole Poirier	Parti Québécois
40th	2012–2014	Carole Poirier	Parti Québécois
41st	2014–2018	Carole Poirier	Parti Québécois
42nd	2018–2022	Alexandre Leduc	Québec solidaire
43rd	2022–2026	Alexandre Leduc	Québec solidaire
44th	2026–Present	Alexandre Leduc	Québec solidaire

== Election results ==
2026 Quebec general election
** Preliminary results — Not yet official **
Party	Candidate	Votes	%	±%
Québec solidaire	Alexandre Leduc	14,033	52.01	+1.17
Parti Québécois	Maude Brossard Sabourin	6,665	24.70	+8.73
Liberal	Janny Gaspard	3,311	12.27	+4.49
Conservative	Elena Perita	1,240	4.60	–0.02
Coalition Avenir Québec	Béatrice Hodonou	1,176	4.36	–14.44
Green	Fajr Al-sayed	246	0.91	–0.43
Parti nul	Raphaëlle Dompierre	139	0.52	N/A
Marxist–Leninist	Christine Dandenault	58	0.21	–0.10
Démocratie directe	Charles Rouillard	57	0.21	N/A
Communist	Igor Sadikov	57	0.21	N/A
Total valid votes		26,982	98.58	–0.17
Total rejected ballots		389	1.42	+0.17
Turnout		27,371	66.77	+4.21
Electors on the lists		40,990		
Québec solidaire hold		Swing		–3.78
Source: Élections Québec

2022 Quebec general election
Party	Candidate	Votes	%	±%
Québec solidaire	Alexandre Leduc	12,784	50.84	+0.79
Coalition Avenir Québec	Rebecca McCann	4,728	18.8	+5.91
Parti Québécois	Stephan Fogaing	4,015	15.97	-7.92
Liberal	Line Flore Tchetmi	1,957	7.78	-2.56
Conservative	Louise Poudrier	1,161	4.62	+4.01
Green	Wejden Chouchene	337	1.34	–
Climat Québec	James Strayer	84	0.33	–
Marxist–Leninist	Christine Dandenault	78	0.31	+0.12
Total valid votes		25,144	98,75	
Total rejected ballots		319	1,25	
Turnout		25,436	62.56	
Electors on the lists		40,699		

2018 Quebec general election
Party	Candidate	Votes	%	±%
Québec solidaire	Alexandre Leduc	13,389	50.05	+18.26
Parti Québécois	Carole Poirier	6,310	23.59	-11.27
Coalition Avenir Québec	Sarah Beaumier	3,447	12.89	+0.94
Liberal	Julien Provencher-Proulx	2,766	10.34	-7.69
New Democratic	Eric-Abel Baland	337	1.26	–
Bloc Pot	Etienne Mallette	170	0.64	-0.06
Conservative	Mathieu Beaudoin	164	0.61	–
Citoyens au pouvoir	Gabriel Boily	117	0.44	–
Marxist–Leninist	Christine Dandenault	52	0.19	-0.05
Total valid votes		26,752	98.28	
Total rejected ballots		467	1.72	
Turnout		27,219	63.40	-0.29
Eligible voters		42,934		
Québec solidaire gain from Parti Québécois		Swing		+14.77
Source(s) "Rapport des résultats officiels du scrutin". Élections Québec.

2014 Quebec general election
Party	Candidate	Votes	%	±%
Parti Québécois	Carole Poirier	9,038	34.86	-10.24
Québec solidaire	Alexandre Leduc	7,926	30.57	+6.88
Liberal	David Provencher	4,675	18.03	+6.50
Coalition Avenir Québec	Brendan Walsh	3,097	11.95	-0.65
Green	Malcolm Lewis-Richmond	352	1.36	-0.24
Option nationale	Simon Marchand	316	1.22	-2.73
Parti nul	Justin Canning	278	1.07	+0.50
Bloc Pot	Étienne Mallette	182	0.7	–
Marxist–Leninist	Christine Dandenault	61	0.24	-0.06
Total valid votes		25,925	98.31	–
Total rejected ballots		447	1.69	–
Turnout		26,372	63.69	-6.39
Electors on the lists		41,405	–	–
Parti Québécois hold		Swing		-8.56

2012 Quebec general election
Party	Candidate	Votes	%	±%
Parti Québécois	Carole Poirier	12,754	45.10	-9.21
Québec solidaire	Alexandre Leduc	6,701	23.69	+10.76
Coalition Avenir Québec	David Monette	3,564	12.60	+5.88*
Liberal	Alexandre Farley	3,262	11.53	-9.69
Option nationale	André Lamy	1,116	3.95	–
Green	Nicholas Kulak	453	1.60	-2.61
Parti nul	Denis Poulin	162	0.57	–
Coalition pour la constituante	Jean-François Jetté	145	0.51	–
Marxist–Leninist	Christine Dandenault	84	0.30	-0.30
Parti indépendantiste	Serge Provost	40	0.14	–
Total valid votes		28,281	98.66	–
Total rejected ballots		385	1.34	–
Turnout		28,666	70.08	+22.26
Electors on the lists		40,907	–	–

* Result compared to Action démocratique

2008 Quebec general election
Party	Candidate	Votes	%	±%
Parti Québécois	Carole Poirier	10,530	54.31	+1.60
Liberal	Julie Tremblay	4,115	21.22	+7.66
Québec solidaire	Serge Mongeau	2,508	12.93	+3.26
Action démocratique	Jean-Levy Champagne	1,303	6.72	−8.82
Green	Sylvie Woods	817	4.21	−2.88
Marxist–Leninist	Christine Dandenault	117	0.60	+0.34
Total valid votes		19,390	98.39	
Total rejected ballots		317	1.61	
Turnout		19,707	47.82	−14.36
Electors on the lists		41,210		
Source: Official Results, Le Directeur général des élections du Québec.

2007 Quebec general election
Party	Candidate	Votes	%	±%
Parti Québécois	Louise Harel	13,012	52.71	−3.06
Action démocratique	Marie-Chantal Pelletier	3,836	15.54	+5.14
Liberal	Vahid Vidah-Fortin	3,347	13.56	−12.80
Québec solidaire	Gabriel Chevrefils	2,388	9.67	+6.33
Green	Geneviève Guérin	1,749	7.09	+5.53
Bloc Pot	Starbuck Leroidurock	193	0.78	−1.24
Independent	Daniel Laforest	97	0.39	–
Marxist–Leninist	Christine Dandenault	63	0.26	−0.08
Total valid votes		24,685	98.58	
Total rejected ballots		355	1.42	
Turnout		25,040	62.18	+2.09
Electors on the lists		40,272		
Source: Official Results, Le Directeur général des élections du Québec.

2003 Quebec general election
Party	Candidate	Votes	%	±%
Parti Québécois	Louise Harel	13,138	55.77	−4.84
Liberal	Richer Dompierre	6,210	26.36	+0.83
Action démocratique	Louise Blackburn	2,449	10.40	−1.11
UFP	Lise Alarie	788	3.34	–
Bloc Pot	Alex Néron	476	2.02	–
Green	Daniel Breton	367	1.56	–
Marxist–Leninist	Christine Dandenault	79	0.34	−0.28
Christian Democracy	Mario Richard	52	0.22	–
Total valid votes		23,559	98.40	–
Total rejected ballots		383	1.60	–
Turnout		23,942	60.09	−7.92
Electors on the lists		39,843	–	–
Source: Official Results, Le Directeur général des élections du Québec.

1998 Quebec general election
Party	Candidate	Votes	%	±%
Parti Québécois	Louise Harel	12,922	60.61	−4.17
Liberal	Andrée Trudel	5,444	25.53	−0.80
Action démocratique	Jean-Louis Lalonde	2,454	11.51	+6.06
Socialist Democracy	Félix Lapan	292	1.37	−0.34
Marxist–Leninist	Christine Dandenault	133	0.62	+0.26
Communist	Robert Aubin	75	0.35	–
Total valid votes		21,320	98.41	–
Total rejected ballots		345	1.59	–
Turnout		21,665	68.01	−7.53
Electors on the lists		31,855	–	–
Source: Official Results, Le Directeur général des élections du Québec.

1995 Quebec referendum
Side	Votes	%
Oui	18,522	65.49
Non	9,759	34.51

1994 Quebec general election
Party	Candidate	Votes	%	±%
Parti Québécois	Louise Harel	14,858	64.78	+1.28
Liberal	Eric Taillefer	6,039	26.33	−2.98
Action démocratique	Michèle Piché	1,249	5.45	–
New Democratic	Hugues Tremblay	392	1.71	+0.30
Natural Law	Richard Lauzon	190	0.83	–
Sovereignty	Marc Boyer	127	0.55	–
Marxist–Leninist	Christine Dandenault	82	0.36	+0.10
Total valid votes		22,937	97.68	–
Total rejected ballots		545	2.32	–
Turnout		23,482	75.54	+6.83
Electors on the lists		31,087	–	–
Source: Official Results, Le Directeur général des élections du Québec.

1992 Charlottetown Accord referendum
Side	Votes	%
Non	17,484	71.10
Oui	7,107	28.90

1989 Quebec general election
Party	Candidate	Votes	%
Parti Québécois	Louise Harel	14,639	63.50
Liberal	Yvon Lewis	6,749	29.28
Green	Jean-Pierre Bonenfant	685	2.97
New Democratic	Jocelyne Dupuis	326	1.41
Workers	Ginette St-Amour	144	0.62
Progressive Conservative	Suzanne Ethier	141	0.61
Parti indépendantiste	Michel Larocque	138	0.60
Independent	Keith Meadowcroft	114	0.49
Marxist–Leninist	Christiane Robidoux	60	0.26
Commonwealth of Canada	Daniel Ricard	56	0.24
Total valid votes		23,052	
Rejected and declined votes		548	
Turnout		23,600	68.71
Electors on the lists		34,349	

== See also ==
- List of Quebec provincial electoral districts
- Canadian provincial electoral districts
