= Carole Poirier =

Canadian politician

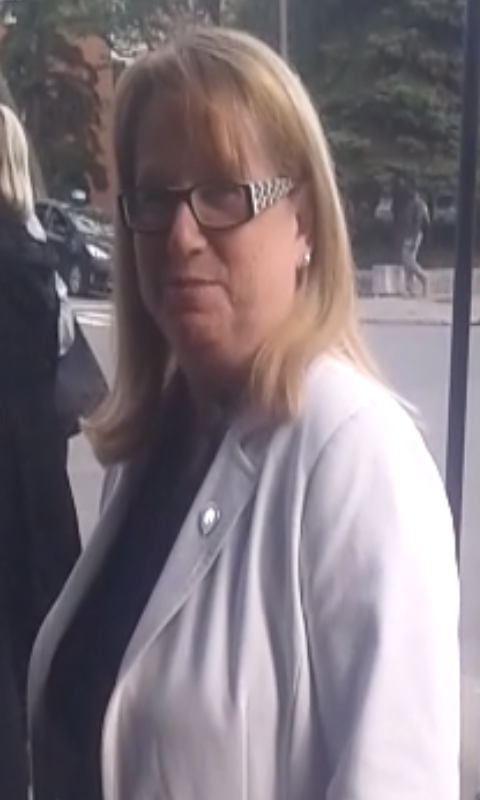

Member of the National Assembly of Quebec for Hochelaga-Maisonneuve
- In office December 8, 2008 – October 18, 2018
- Preceded by: Louise Harel
- Succeeded by: Alexandre Leduc

Personal details
- Born: October 2, 1958 (age 68) Montreal, Quebec
- Party: Parti Québécois
- Education: Université du Québec à Montréal

Carole Poirier (born October 2, 1958) is a Canadian politician. Poirier was elected to represent the Hochelaga-Maisonneuve district in the National Assembly of Quebec in the 2008 provincial election. She is a member of the Parti Québécois (PQ).

Poirier is a graduate from the Université du Québec à Montréal with certificates in administration, municipal services management and public services administration. She also obtained a master's degree in public administration from the École nationale d'administration publique.

From 1997 to 2006, she was the cabinet director for the Minister of employment and social solidarity (1997–1998), the Minister of Municipal Affairs and Metropolitan (1998–2002), the President of the National Assembly of Quebec (2002–2003) and the leader of the official opposition (2005–2006). She was also the treasurer and political organizer for the PQ's Hochelaga-Maisonneuve office.

She was defeated in the 2018 election.

== Electoral record ==
2008 Quebec general election: Hochelaga-Maisonneuve
Party	Candidate	Votes	%	±%
Parti Québécois	Carole Poirier	10,530	54.31	+1.60
Liberal	Julie Tremblay	4,115	21.22	+7.66
Québec solidaire	Serge Mongeau	2,508	12.93	+3.26
Action démocratique	Jean-Levy Champagne	1,303	6.72	−8.82
Green	Sylvie Woods	817	4.21	−2.88
Marxist–Leninist	Christine Dandenault	117	0.60	+0.34
Total valid votes		19,390	98.39	
Total rejected ballots		317	1.61	
Turnout		19,707	47.82	−14.36
Electors on the lists		41,210		
Source: Official Results, Le Directeur général des élections du Québec.
