= Agnès Maltais =

Canadian politician

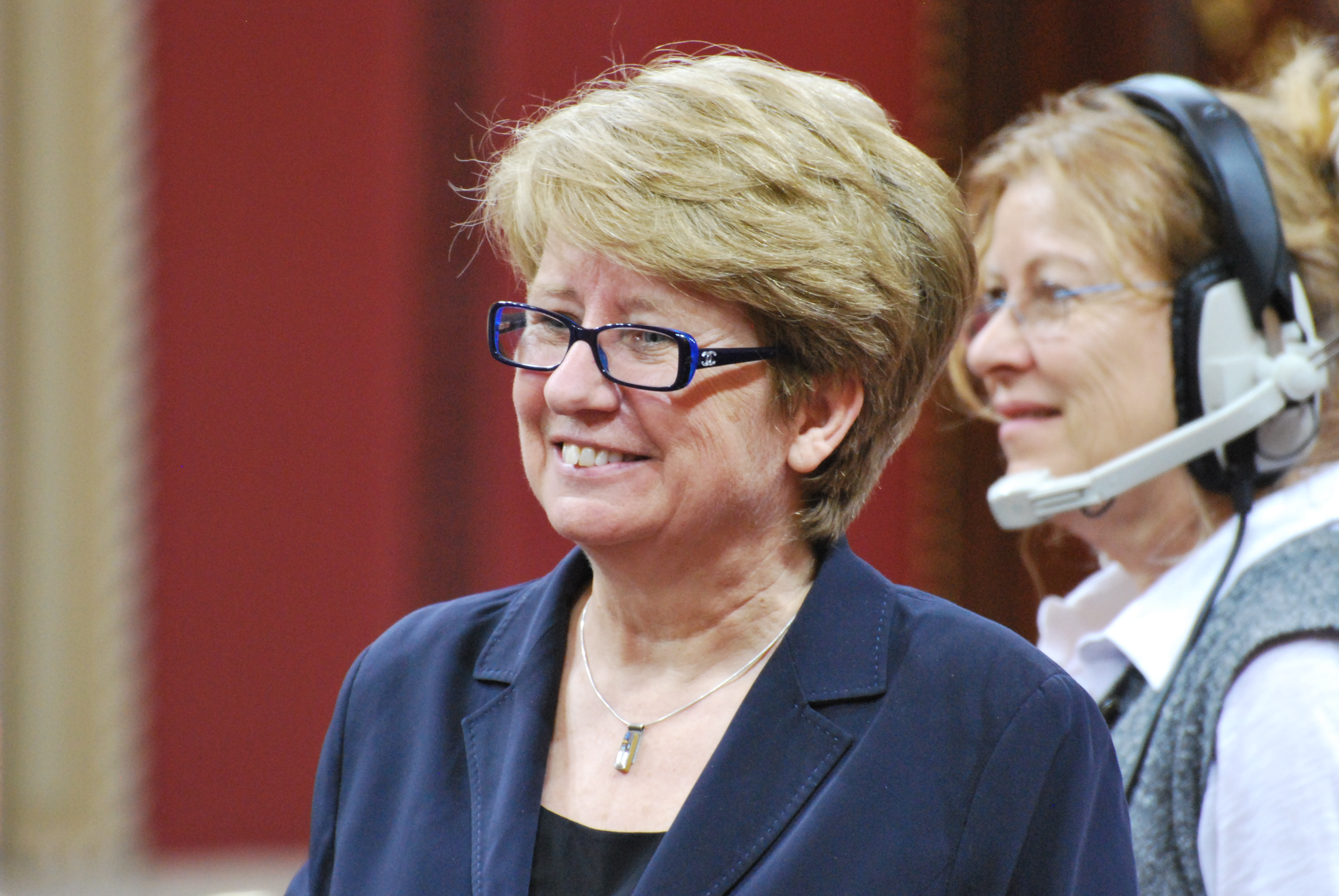
- Agnès Maltais at the National Order of Quebec ceremony in June 2013.

Member of the National Assembly of Quebec for Taschereau
- In office November 30, 1998 – October 1, 2018
- Preceded by: André Gaulin
- Succeeded by: Catherine Dorion

Personal details
- Born: November 7, 1956 (age 69) Sault-au-Mouton, Quebec, Canada
- Party: Parti Québécois
- Portfolio: Capitale-Nationale, public works

Agnès Maltais (born November 7, 1956) is a Canadian politician from Quebec. She was a Member of the National Assembly of Quebec for the riding of Taschereau in the Quebec City region. She represented the Parti Québécois.

Maltais mostly worked in the theatrical sector being a development agent for Video-Femmes and the director of the Periscope and the la Bordée theaters. She was also a member of the Conseil québécois de théâtre. She was a political activist since 1976 when she obtained a diploma at the Cégep de Sainte-Foy. She was a spokesperson for the YES committee in the 1995 referendum and was involved in the organization of the Fête Nationale concerts and shows in 1991 and 1995.

Maltais was first elected in Taschereau in 1998 and became the Minister of Culture and Communications from 1998 to 2001. She was then named the Delegate Minister of Health, Social Services and Youth protection and Delegate Minister of Employment. Re-elected in 2003, she was the President of the Opposition Caucus. After 9 years in Opposition, the PQ formed a slim minority government after the 2012 election. Maltais immediately entered Cabinet as Minister of Labour, Employment, and Social Solidarity and Minister responsible for the status of women. In this portfolio, she presided over controversial changes to the social assistance system in Quebec, that put the PQ government in conflict with some anti-poverty groups. Maltais was also critical of changes to the EI system announced by the federal Conservative government in Ottawa.

Long identified with the left wing of the Parti Quebecois, Maltais has been elected 6 times in the inner-city riding of Taschereau in Quebec City. While the riding had been a safe seat for the PQ, it has become much more marginal in recent years as the PQ has become increasingly less and less competitive in the Capital Region. In 2014, Maltais only held onto the riding by 400 votes over her Liberal challenger and hers was the only PQ held seat in the region. She did not run for re-election in 2018.

In 2003, Ms. Maltais became the first openly lesbian member of the National Assembly, when she came out to an audience at Laval University. In 2006, she participated in the International Conference on LGBT Human Rights.

== Electoral record ==
2003 Quebec general election: Taschereau
Party	Candidate	Votes	%	±%
Parti Québécois	Agnès Maltais	12,930	38.95	
Liberal	Michel Beaudoin	11,240	33.86	
Action démocratique	Jean-Guy Lemieux	6,537	19.69	
UFP	Alain Marcoux	1,176	3.54	
Green	Dominic Lapointe	731	2.20	
Bloc Pot	Benjamin Kasapoglu	389	1.17	
Independent	Patrice Fortin	102	0.31	
Independent	Alain Cyr	95	0.29	
Total valid votes		33,200	100.00	
Rejected and declined votes		456		
Turnout		33,656	69.37	
Electors on the lists		48,515		

1998 Quebec general election: Taschereau
Party	Candidate	Votes	%	±%
Parti Québécois	Agnès Maltais	11,327	47.00	
Liberal	Claude Doré	8,793	36.48	
Action démocratique	Marie-France Lachaîne	3,033	12.58	
Socialist Democracy	Alain Marcoux	521	2.16	
Independent	Denys Duchêne	352	1.46	
Independent	Patrice Fortin	76	0.32	
Total valid votes		24,102	100.00	
Rejected and declined votes		425		
Turnout		24,527	73.84	
Electors on the lists		33,217		

Political offices
Preceded by Louise Beaudoin	Minister of Culture and Communications; 1998–2001	Succeeded by Diane Lemieux
