= Serge Mongeau =

Canadian writer and politician (1937–2025)

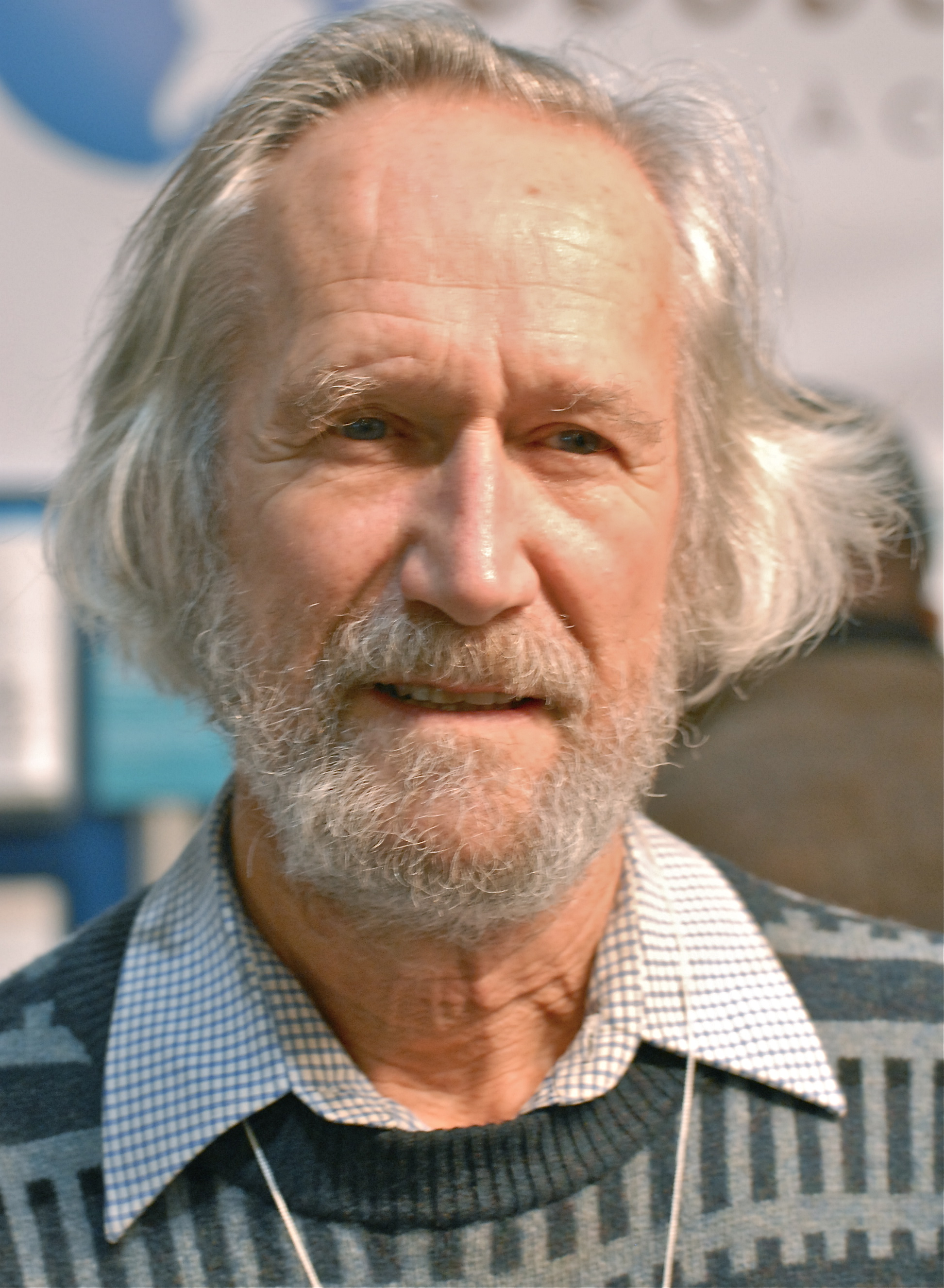
- Mongeau in 2010
- Born: March 24, 1937; Montreal, Quebec, Canada
- Died: May 9, 2025 (aged 88)
- Occupation: Writer
- Known for: Advocate of simple living, political candidate

Serge Mongeau (March 24, 1937 – May 9, 2025) was a Quebec physician, writer, publisher and politician. He was one of the best-known Canadian advocates of simple living.

== Life and career ==
Serge Mongeau studied medicine at Université de Montréal. After practising general medicine for two years, he went back to U. de M. and obtained a master in social work, option community organization. In the early 1960s, Mongeau was one of the few resource persons in sexology in Quebec. In 1965, he became president of the Family Planning Association of Montréal and called on the Catholic church to develop a more modernist approach to contraception. Dr. Mongeau was the director of the Family Planning Centre (Centre de planification familiale du Québec), a multi-disciplinary centre in Montréal. In 1967–1970, he published Cours de sexologie, a five-volume work about sexology written for the general public, which was a best-seller. By 1970, he had published eleven books at Jacques Hébert's Éditions du Jour. He also wrote for the left-leaning weekly newspaper Québec-Presse.

In politics, he became a member of the Parti québécois. During the 1970 Quebec general election, after alleged irregularities in the nomination of the Parti québécois candidate J.-Y. Lefebvre in the riding of Taillon, Mongeau ran as an independent candidate in the riding and obtained 7.6% of the votes. In June 1970 he participated in the founding of the Movement for the defense of political prisoners. During the time of the October Crisis, when the War Measures Act was decreed by the government of Pierre Trudeau, Dr. Mongeau, while on his way to work at the Family Planning Centre on the morning of October 16, 1970, was intercepted by police, thrown in jail without accusation and kept there secretly for ten days without contact with the exterior. He wrote about that experience in his book Kidnappé par la police (Kidnapped by Police).

In the 1970s, he traveled and studied political science at the Facultad latinoamericana de ciencias sociales in Chile. Back in Canada, he became the director of the Centre local de services communautaires of Saint-Hubert.

From 1978, he dedicated himself full-time to writing and publishing. He became the director of the "Heath" collection at the Québec/Amérique publishing house. In 1985, he published the first edition of his book on simple living. He wrote "I try to realise within myself what I think should be the basis of a fair universe for all: I try to be good, tolerant, honest and just." In 1986, he became director of the "Peace" collection at the Libre Expression publishing house. In 1992, with a group of friends, he founded the publishing house Écosociété, specialized in the themes of society, economy and environment. Mongeau lived in l'île d'Orléans for twenty years. He moved back to Montréal in 2008.

In the 2008 Quebec general election, Serge Mongeau was candidate for Québec solidaire in the electoral district of Hochelaga-Maisonneuve. He obtained 12.9% of the votes.

He published a two-part autobiography in 2006 and 2012.

Mongeau died on May 9, 2025, at the age of 88. He requested medically assisted death, saying that he "no longer ha[d] the capacity to pursue the action needed to lead our society towards a simple, ecological, and communitarian life".

== Books ==
- Naissances planifiées. Pourquoi? Comment?, in collaboration with Hubert Charbonneau, Éditions du Jour, Montréal, 1966, 153 pages
- Cours de sexologie, Éditions du Jour, Montréal, 1967–1970, in five volumes:
  1. De la fécondation à l'âge adulte, 1967
  2. Les âges de l'amour et les rapports sexuels, 1968
  3. La grossesse et la planification familiale, 1967
  4. Les difficultés sexuelles de l'individu et du couple, 1968
  5. Sexualité et société. La vieillesse, 1970
- Évolution de l'assistance au Québec. Une étude historique des diverses modalités d'assistance au Québec, des origines de la colonie à nos jours, Éditions du Jour, Montréal, 1967, 123 pages (originally written for the author's master in social work, option community organization)
- L'avortement, in collaboration with Renée Cloutier, Éditions du Jour, Montréal, 1968, 173 pages
- Kidnappé par la police, Éditions du Jour, Montréal, 1970, 128 pages; and, in a reedition enlarged with a preface and an annex, Kidnappé par la police, Éditions Écosociété, Montréal, 2001, 187 pages, ISBN 2-921561-58-1
- Vivre en santé, Éditions Québec/Amérique, Montréal, 1982, 141 pages, ISBN 2-89037-111-5
- Dictionnaire des médicaments de A à Z, in collaboration with Marie-Claude Roy, Éditions Québec/Amérique, Montréal, 1984, 525 pages, ISBN 2-89037-180-8
- Nouveau dictionnaire des médicaments, in collaboration with Marie-Claude Roy, Éditions Québec/Amérique, Montréal, 1988, 860 pages, ISBN 2-89037-375-4
- Le Rêve écrasé : Québec-Chili 1973, Éditions Québec/Amérique, Montréal, 1990, 268 pages, ISBN 978-2-89037-482-9
- La simplicité volontaire, Éditions Québec/Amérique, Montréal, 1985, 151 pages, ISBN 978-2-89037-254-2; and in reedition under the title La simplicité volontaire, plus que jamais..., Éditions Écosociété, 1998, 272 pages, ISBN 2-921561-39-5
- Parce que la paix n'est pas une utopie, Éditions Libre Expression, Montréal, 1990, ISBN 978-2-89111-406-6; and in reedition Parce que la paix n'est pas une utopie, Éditions Écosociété, Montréal, 137 pages, ISBN 2-921561-25-5
- La Belle Vie, ou le bonheur dans l'harmonie, Éditions Libre Expression, Montréal, 1991, 116 pages, ISBN 978-2-89111-508-7; and in reedition La Belle Vie, Éditions Écosociété, Montréal, 2004, 130 pages, ISBN 2-923165-01-2
- Pour un pays sans armée, collective work under the direction of Serge Mongeau, Éditions Écosociété, Montréal, 1993, 186 pages, ISBN 2-921561-00-X
- L'écosophie ou la sagesse de la nature, Éditions Écosociété, Montréal, 1994, 158 pages, ISBN 2-921561-06-9
- Moi, ma santé. De la dépendance à l'autonomie, Éditions Écosociété, Montréal, 1994, 182 pages, ISBN 2-921561-20-4
- Objecteurs de croissance. Pour sortir de l'impasse : la décroissance, collective work under the direction of Serge Mongeau, Éditions Écosociété, Montréal, 144 pages, ISBN 978-2-923165-34-9
- Non, je n'accepte pas. Autobiographie, tome 1 (1937–1979), Éditions Écosociété, Montréal, 2006, 296 pages, ISBN 2-923165-15-2
- Heureux, mais pas content. Autobiographie (1979–2011), Éditions Écosociété, Montréal, 2012, 212 pages, ISBN 978-2-923165-85-1

== Electoral record ==
Electoral record
Election	Division	Party	Votes	%	Place	Winner
1970 Quebec general election	Taillon	Independent	2,998	7.6	4/7	Guy Leduc, Quebec Liberal Party
2008 Quebec general election	Hochelaga-Maisonneuve	Québec solidaire	2,508	12.93	3/6	Carole Poirier, Parti Québécois
