= Jean Leclerc (politician) =

Canadian politician

Member of the National Assembly of Quebec for Taschereau
- In office 1985–1994
- Preceded by: Richard Guay
- Succeeded by: André Gaulin

Personal details
- Born: May 28, 1958 (age 68) Quebec City, Quebec
- Party: Liberal
- Parents: Jean-Robert Leclerc (father); Suzanne Lajeunesse (mother)
- Education: Université Laval
- Occupation: businessman

Jean Leclerc, CQ (French pronunciation: [ʒɑ̃ ləklɛʁ]; born May 28, 1958) is a Canadian businessman and former politician.

== Biography ==
Born in Quebec City, Quebec, the son of Jean-Robert Leclerc and Suzanne Lajeunesse, Leclerc received a Bachelor's degree from Université Laval in 1977. In 1977, he started working at Biscuits Leclerc, a cookie and snack manufacturer founded in 1905 by François Leclerc (Jean Leclerc’s great-grandfather). In 1985, he was elected to the National Assembly of Quebec for Taschereau. A Liberal, he was re-elected in 1989. He did not run in 1994. He was Minister of government services, vice-president of the Treasury Board, and Minister responsible for the Quebec City region.

In 1995, he re-joined his family firm as a Vice-President. In 2003, he was appointed president and CEO. In 2006, he was Chairman of the Quebec City 400th Anniversary Society.

In 2009, he was made a Knight of the National Order of Quebec.
