= Taschereau (electoral district) =

Provincial electoral district in Quebec, Canada

Coordinates: 46.81°N 71.23°W

Quebec electoral district
- Location in Quebec

Provincial electoral district
- Legislature: National Assembly of Quebec
MNA
Étienne Grandmont
Québec solidaire
- District created: 1972
- First contested: 1973
- Last contested: 2026

Demographics
- Population (2011): 62,215
- Electors (2012): 48,691
- Area (km²): 16.5
- Pop. density (per km²): 3,770.6
- Census division: Quebec City (part)
- Census subdivision(s): Quebec City (part), Notre-Dame-des-Anges

Taschereau (French pronunciation: [taʃʁo]) is a provincial electoral district in the Capitale-Nationale region of Quebec, Canada, that elects members to the National Assembly of Quebec. It consists of part of the La Cité-Limoilou borough of Quebec City and the tiny enclave of Notre-Dame-des-Anges.

It was created for the 1973 election from parts of Jean-Talon and Saint-Sauveur electoral districts.

In the change from the 2001 to the 2011 electoral map, it lost territory to Jean-Lesage and Vanier-Les Rivières but gained territory from Jean-Talon.

The district is named after former Quebec Premier Louis-Alexandre Taschereau who served as premier from 1920 to 1936.

== Members of the National Assembly ==
This riding has elected the following members of the National Assembly:

Legislature	Years	Member	Party
Riding created from Jean-Talon and Saint-Sauveur
30th	1973–1976	Irénée Bonnier	Liberal
31st	1976–1981	Richard Guay	Parti Québécois
32nd	1981–1985	Richard Guay	Parti Québécois
33rd	1985–1989	Jean Leclerc	Liberal
34th	1989–1994	Jean Leclerc	Liberal
35th	1994–1998	André Gaulin	Parti Québécois
36th	1998–2003	Agnès Maltais	Parti Québécois
37th	2003–2007	Agnès Maltais	Parti Québécois
38th	2007–2008	Agnès Maltais	Parti Québécois
39th	2008–2012	Agnès Maltais	Parti Québécois
40th	2012–2014	Agnès Maltais	Parti Québécois
41st	2014–2018	Agnès Maltais	Parti Québécois
42nd	2018–2022	Catherine Dorion	Québec solidaire
43rd	2022–2026	Étienne Grandmont	Québec solidaire
44th	2026–Present	Étienne Grandmont	Québec solidaire

== Election results ==
2026 Quebec general election
** Preliminary results — Not yet official **
Party	Candidate	Votes	%	±%
Québec solidaire	Étienne Grandmont	15,020	41.77	
Parti Québécois	Christian Savard	9,081	25.25	
Liberal	Farnell Morisset	5,043	14.02	
Conservative	Eliot Estévez-Verville	4,140	11.51	
Coalition Avenir Québec	Brigitte Martin	2,378	6.61	
Climat Québec	Jean-François Joubert	143	0.40	
Independent	Patrick Kerr	121	0.34	
Équipe Autonomiste	Guy Boivin	36	0.10	
Total valid votes				
Total rejected ballots				
Turnout			74.44	
Electors on the lists			–	–
Québec solidaire hold		Swing		
Source: Élections Québec

2022 Quebec general election
Party	Candidate	Votes	%	±%
Québec solidaire	Étienne Grandmont	13,588	39.53	-2.99
Parti Québécois	Jeanne Robin	7,757	22.57	+4.93
Coalition Avenir Québec	Pascale St-Hilaire	7,537	21.93	+2.95
Conservative	Marie-Josée Hélie	3,012	8.76	–
Liberal	Ahmed Lamine Touré	2,025	5.89	-11.77
Green	Andrew Karim	225	0.65	-0.83
Climat Québec	Jean-François Joubert	102	0.30	–
Independent	Marie-Soleil Fillion	83	0.24	–
Équipe Autonomiste	Guy Boivin	41	0.12	-0.08
Total valid votes		34,570	99.33	–
Total rejected ballots		321	0.67	-0.51
Turnout		34,891	72.28	-1.46
Electors on the lists		47,996	–	–

2018 Quebec general election
Party	Candidate	Votes	%	±%
Québec solidaire	Catherine Dorion	15,373	42.52	+27.23
Coalition Avenir Québec	Svetlana Solomykina	6,862	18.98	+2.58
Liberal	Florent Tanlet	6,387	17.66	-12.74
Parti Québécois	Diane Lavallée	6,379	17.64	-14.02
Green	Élisabeth Grégoire	534	1.48	
Parti nul	Nicolas Pouliot	201	0.56	-0.51
New Democratic	Roger Duguay	196	0.54	
Citoyens au pouvoir	Christian Lavoie	152	0.42	
Équipe Autonomiste	Guy Boivin	73	0.20	+0.06
Total valid votes		36,157	98.82	
Total rejected ballots		431	1.18	
Turnout		36,588	73.74	
Eligible voters		49,619		
Québec solidaire gain from Parti Québécois		Swing		+12.33
Source(s) "Rapport des résultats officiels du scrutin". Élections Québec.

2014 Quebec general election
Party	Candidate	Votes	%	±%
Parti Québécois	Agnès Maltais	11,376	31.66	-5.40
Liberal	Florent Tanlet	10,925	30.40	+4.72
Coalition Avenir Québec	Steve Brabant	5,865	16.32	-0.39
Québec solidaire	Marie-Ève Duchesne	5,495	15.29	+3.60
Option nationale	Catherine Dorion	1,513	4.21	-3.22
Parti nul	Jean-Luc Savard	385	1.07	+0.12
Conservative	Anne Deblois	198	0.55	–
Parti des sans Parti	Sylvain Drolet	127	0.35	–
Équipe Autonomiste	Guy Boivin	49	0.14	-0.05
Total valid votes		35,933	98.72	–
Total rejected ballots		466	1.28	–
Turnout		36,399	73.41	-3.96
Electors on the lists		49,582	–	–

2012 Quebec general election
Party	Candidate	Votes	%	±%
Parti Québécois	Agnès Maltais	13,994	37.06	-7.16
Liberal	Clément Gignac	9,697	25.68	-3.80
Coalition Avenir Québec	Mario Asselin	6,311	16.71	+3.32*
Québec solidaire	Serge Roy	4,416	11.69	+3.27
Option nationale	Catherine Dorion	2,804	7.43	–
Parti nul	Jean-Luc Savard	358	0.95	–
Coalition pour la constituante	François Tremblay	110	0.29	–
Équipe Autonomiste	Guy Boivin	72	0.19	–
Total valid votes		37,762	98.91	–
Total rejected ballots		418	1.09	–
Turnout		38,180	77.37	+20.41
Electors on the lists		49,350	–	–

* Result compared to Action démocratique

2008 Quebec general election
Party	Candidate	Votes	%	±%
Parti Québécois	Agnès Maltais	11,768	44.22	+7.12
Liberal	Hébert Dufour	7,845	29.48	+8.21
Action démocratique	Renée-Claude Lizotte	3,563	13.39	-14.16
Québec solidaire	Serge Roy	2,241	8.42	+0.18
Green	Antonine Yaccarini	1,048	3.94	-1.65
Parti indépendantiste	Mélanie Thériault	149	0.56	–
Total valid votes		26,614	98.56	–
Total rejected ballots		388	1.44	–
Turnout		27,002	56.96	-13.58
Electors on the lists		47,407	–	–

2007 Quebec general election
Party	Candidate	Votes	%
Parti Québécois	Agnès Maltais	12,340	37.10
Action démocratique	Carolyn Pageau	9,612	27.55
Liberal	Philippe Dufour	7,073	21.27
Québec solidaire	Serge Roy	2,741	8.24
Green	Yonnel Bonaventure	1,860	3.94
Independent	Luc Schulz	81	0.24
Total valid votes		33,257	99.00
Total rejected ballots		336	1.00
Turnout		33,593	70.54
Electors on the lists		47,620	–

2003 Quebec general election
Party	Candidate	Votes	%
Parti Québécois	Agnès Maltais	12,930	38.95
Liberal	Michel Beaudoin	11,240	38.86
Action démocratique	Jean-Guy Lemieux	6,537	19.69
UFP	Alain Marcoux	1,176	3.54
Green	Dominic Lapointe	731	2.20
Bloc Pot	Benjamin Kasapoglu	389	1.17
Independent	Patrice Fortin	102	0.31
Independent	Alain Cyr	95	0.29
Total valid votes		33,200	98.65
Total rejected ballots		456	1.35
Turnout		33,656	69.37
Electors on the lists		48,515	–

1998 Quebec general election
Party	Candidate	Votes	%
Parti Québécois	Agnès Maltais	11,327	47.00
Liberal	Claude Doré	8,793	36.48
Action démocratique	Marie-France Lachaîne	3,033	12.58
Socialist Democracy	Alain Marcoux	521	2.16
Independent RAP	Denys Duchêne	352	1.46
Independent	Patrice Fortin	76	0.32
Total valid votes		24,102	98.27
Total rejected ballots		425	1.73
Turnout		24,527	73.84
Electors on the lists		33,217	–

1995 Quebec referendum
Side	Votes	%
Oui	17,358	59.05
Non	12,038	40.95

1994 Quebec general election
Party	Candidate	Votes	%
Parti Québécois	André Gaulin	12,308	51.86
Liberal	Jean-Guy Gilbert	6,525	27.49
Action démocratique	Lyne Tremblay	2,041	8.60
New Democratic	Serge Foisy	705	2.97
Independent PQ	Denys Duchêne	547	2.30
Independent	Nancy Labbé	430	1.81
Independent	André Dorval	386	1.63
Natural Law	Monique Gilbert	332	1.40
Independent	Jocelyn Pelletier	145	0.61
Independent	Daniel Pelletier	109	0.46
Development	Daniel-Roméo Roy	80	0.34
Independent	J.-Gaston Miohaud	79	0.33
Independent	Noël Poirer	45	0.19
Total valid votes		24,102	98.27
Total rejected ballots		425	1.73
Turnout		24,527	73.84
Electors on the lists		33,217	–

1992 Charlottetown Accord referendum
Side	Votes	%
Non	14,423	67.37
Oui	6,987	32.63

1989 Quebec general election
Party	Candidate	Votes	%
Liberal	Jean Leclerc	10,176	50.44
Parti Québécois	François Tremblay	8,741	43.33
New Democratic	Hélène Huard	1,258	6.24
Total valid votes		20,175	96.39
Total rejected ballots		756	3.61
Turnout		20,931	74.20
Electors on the lists		28,209	–

1985 Quebec general election
Party	Candidate	Votes	%
Liberal	Jean Leclerc	11,584	53.81
Parti Québécois	Richard Guay	8,095	37.60
New Democratic	Pierre Rivard	1,217	5.65
Progressive Conservative	Jean-Yves Boulianne	236	1.10
Independent	Jay Laurence Taylor	209	0.97
Independent	Roger Labadie	100	0.46
Christian Socialism	Denis Thériault	87	0.41
Total valid votes		24,528	98.00
Total rejected ballots		439	2.00
Turnout		21,967	72.54
Electors on the lists		30,284	–

1981 Quebec general election
Party	Candidate	Votes	%
Parti Québécois	Richard Guay	13,591	56.98
Liberal	Florence Ievers	9,384	39.35
Union Nationale	Lucien Gauthier	566	2.37
Workers Communist	Denise Beauchesne	236	1.10
Communist	Daniel Paquet	209	0.97
Marxist–Leninist	Serge Tremblay	100	0.46
Total valid votes		23,851	98.41
Total rejected ballots		386	1.59
Turnout		24,237	76.39
Electors on the lists		31,726	–

1980 Quebec referendum
Side	Votes	%
Non	10,677	53.08
Oui	9,438	46.92

1976 Quebec general election
Party	Candidate	Votes	%
Parti Québécois	Richard Guay	9,929	45.14
Liberal	Irénée Bonnier	8,097	36.81
Union Nationale	Marcel Drouin	2,531	11.51
Ralliement créditiste	Simon Brouard	1,179	5.36
Parti national populaire	Jean-Marc Lemoine	151	0.69
Workers	Lorraine Morin	107	0.49
Total valid votes		21,994	96.56
Total rejected ballots		784	3.44
Turnout		22,778	80.05
Electors on the lists		28,453	–

1973 Quebec general election
Party	Candidate	Votes	%
Liberal	Irénée Bonnier	11,714	51.94
Parti Québécois	Lucien Roy	6,964	30.88
Ralliement créditiste	Jean-Marc Gignac	2,334	10.35
Union Nationale	Madame Claude Bureau	1,438	6.38
Marxist–Leninist	Serge Tremblay	102	0.45
Total valid votes		22,552	97.55
Total rejected ballots		566	2.45
Turnout		23,118	73.79
Electors on the lists		31,331	–

== See also ==
- List of Quebec provincial electoral districts
- Canadian provincial electoral districts
