= Parti démocratie chrétienne du Québec candidates in the 2003 Quebec provincial election =

The Parti démocratie chrétienne du Québec fielded twenty-five candidates in the 2003 Quebec provincial election, none of whom were elected.

== Candidates ==
Riding	Candidate's Name	Gender	Residence	Occupation	Votes	%	Rank	Notes
Bourassa-Sauvé	Denis Gagné	M			119	0.36	6th	A candidate named Denis Gagné contested the 2008 Canadian federal election in an Ontario riding; it is not known if this was the same person.
Hochelaga-Maisonneuve	Mario Richard	M			52	0.22	8th	Richard has been active in Quebec's anti-abortion movement.
Richelieu	Florette Villemure Larochelle	F			74	0.26	7th	Villemure Larochelle was sixty-four years old during the 2003 campaign. An active Roman Catholic, she campaigned in support of Catholic social values and an increased birthrate.
