= André Gaulin =

Canadian politician (born 1936)

Member of the National Assembly of Quebec for Taschereau
- In office September 12, 1994 – November 30, 1998
- Preceded by: Jean Leclerc
- Succeeded by: Agnès Maltais

Personal details
- Born: July 5, 1936 (age 90) Quebec City, Quebec
- Party: Parti Québécois
- Profession: Educator

André Gaulin (born July 5, 1936) is a Quebec politician who served as the member for Taschereau in the Quebec National Assembly as a member of the Parti Québécois from 1994 until 1998.

== Biography ==
He obtained a bachelor's degree in pedagogy, a bachelor's degree in catechesis, a bachelor's degree in history and a diploma from the Ecole normale supérieure in Paris. a master's degree in letters from Université Laval and a doctorate from the Université de Sherbrooke. he was known as Brother Marie-Conrad from his religious community Frères des Ecoles Chrétiennes between 1956 and 1966.

Gaulin went on to teach in elementary, high school and college, becoming a professor at Université Laval.

He became President of the professors' union of École normale de Laval from 1968 to 1970 and then became President of le Association québécoise des professeurs de français from 1970 to 1972. He was the founding co-President of the Mouvement Québec français in 1970 and member of its executive committee.

== Political career ==
Gaulin ran in the 1994 Quebec provincial election for the seat of Taschereau and won handily serving as a backbench supporter of the Jacques Parizeau and Lucien Bouchard governments. He did not run again in the 1998 Quebec provincial election.

== Career after politics ==
Gaulin was appointed Professor emeritus at Université Laval in June 2001. Vice-President of the Association of Members of the Ordre des Palmes Académiques, Québec chapter, in 2003, and then became president in 2004.

== Awards ==
He received the honour of Chevalier of le Ordre des Palmes Académiques by France in 1985, promoted to Officer in 1996 and Commander in 2006. In 2000, he was awarded the bronze medal by the Société nationale des québécois de la capital, and the Prix Georges-Émile-Lapalme in 2003.

== Electoral Record ==
=== Provincial ===
1994 Quebec general election
Party	Candidate	Votes	%
Parti Québécois	André Gaulin	12,308	51.86
Liberal	Jean-Guy Gilbert	6,525	27.49
Action démocratique	Lyne Tremblay	2,041	8.60
New Democratic	Serge Foisy	705	2.97
Independent PQ	Denys Duchêne	547	2.30
Independent	Nancy Labbé	430	1.81
Independent	André Dorval	386	1.63
Natural Law	Monique Gilbert	332	1.40
Independent	Jocelyn Pelletier	145	0.61
Independent	Daniel Pelletier	109	0.46
Development	Daniel-Roméo Roy	80	0.34
Independent	J.-Gaston Miohaud	79	0.33
Independent	Noël Poirer	45	0.19
Total valid votes		24,102	98.27
Total rejected ballots		425	1.73
Turnout		24,527	73.84
Electors on the lists		33,217	–
