= Jean Leclercq (politician) =

Jean Leclercq (2 June 1925, in Tournai – 24 December 1970, in Tournai) was a Belgian politician and Walloon militant.

Jean Lerclercq was a member of the Conseil économique wallon when it joined the Walloon Rally in 1968 with the foundation of the local plan. He became a popular voice, and was elected in the elections of 31 March 1968. He was one of the first of the Walloon Rally to be elected to Parliament. He became a member of the Agricultural and Family Commission but he died at Christmas 1970. Paul Van Damme succeeded him.

At the Walloon Rally Congress of 22 and 23 March 1969, he insisted that Mouscron and Comines were 100% French, and for stronger relations between the Walloons and France. At the communal elections of Tournai in October 1970, he opposed others in his party, and founded his own list, named Rénovation tournaisienne. He was elected communal councillor, but died before he could take up his seat.
