= 36th Quebec Legislature =

The 36th National Assembly of Quebec was the provincial legislature in Quebec, Canada that was elected in the 1998 Quebec general election and sat from March 2, 1999, to March 9, 2001, and from March 22, 2001, to March 12, 2003. The Parti Québécois was the governing party with premiers Lucien Bouchard (November 1998 to January 2001) and Bernard Landry (January 2001 to April 2003).

== Seats per political party ==
- After the 1998 elections

Affiliation	Members
Parti Québécois	76
Parti libéral du Québec	48
Action démocratique du Québec	1
Total	125
Government Majority	27

== Member list ==
This was the list of members of the National Assembly of Quebec that were elected in the 1998 election:

Name	Party	Riding	First elected / previously elected	No. of terms
André Pelletier	Parti Québécois	Abitibi-Est	1994	2nd term
François Gendron	Parti Québécois	Abitibi-Ouest	1976	6th term
Yvan Bordeleau	Libéral	Acadie	1989	3rd term
Jean-Sébastien Lamoureux	Libéral	Anjou	1998	1st term
Lise Thériault (2002)	Libéral	Anjou	2002	1st term
David Whissell	Libéral	Argenteuil	1998	2nd term
Jacques Baril	Parti Québécois	Arthabaska	1976, 1989	5th term*
Normand Poulin	Libéral	Beauce-Nord	1994	2nd term
Diane Leblanc	Libéral	Beauce-Sud	1997	2nd term
André Chenail	Libéral	Beauharnois-Huntingdon	1989	3rd term
Claude Lachance	Parti Québécois	Bellechasse	1981, 1994	3rd term*
Gilles Baril	Parti Québécois	Berthier	1981, (Note: Rouyn-Noranda–Témiscamingue) 1994	3rd term*
Marie Grégoire (2002)	ADQ	Berthier	2002	1st term
Claude Cousineau	Parti Québécois	Bertrand	1998	1st term
Céline Signori	Parti Québécois	Blainville	1994	2nd term
Richard Legendre (2001)	Parti Québécois	Blainville	2001	1st term
Nathalie Normandeau	Libéral	Bonaventure	1998	1st term
Jean-Pierre Charbonneau	Parti Québécois	Borduas	1976, (Note: Verchères) 1994	5th term*
Michèle Lamquin-Éthier	Libéral	Bourassa	1997	2nd term
Diane Lemieux	Parti Québécois	Bourget	1998	1st term
Pierre Paradis	Libéral	Brome-Missisquoi	1980	6th term
Louise Beaudoin	Parti Québécois	Chambly	1994	2nd term
Yves Beaumier	Parti Québécois	Champlain	1981, (Note: Nicolet) 1994	3rd term*
Benoît Pelletier	Libéral	Chapleau	1998	1st term
Jean Rochon	Parti Québécois	Charlesbourg	1994	2nd term
Rosaire Bertrand	Parti Québécois	Charlevoix	1994	2nd term
Jean-Marc Fournier	Libéral	Châteauguay	1994	2nd term
Raymond Brouillet	Parti Québécois	Chauveau	1981, 1994	3rd term*
Stéphane Bédard	Parti Québécois	Chicoutimi	1998	1st term
Thomas J. Mulcair	Libéral	Chomedey	1994	2nd term
Denise Carrier-Perreault	Parti Québécois	Chutes-de-la-Chaudière	1989	3rd term
Manon Blanchet	Parti Québécois	Crémazie	1998	1st term
Lawrence Bergman	Libéral	D'Arcy-McGee	1994	2nd term
Hélène Robert	Parti Québécois	Deux-Montagnes	1994	2nd term
Normand Jutras	Parti Québécois	Drummond	1994	2nd term
Jacques Côté	Parti Québécois	Dubuc	1998	1st term
Normand Duguay	Parti Québécois	Duplessis	1997	2nd term
Joseph Facal	Parti Québécois	Fabre	1994	2nd term
Marc Boulianne	Parti Québécois	Frontenac	1998	1st term
Guy Lelièvre	Parti Québécois	Gaspé	1994	2nd term
Réjean Lafrenière	Libéral	Gatineau	1989	3rd term
André Boisclair	Parti Québécois	Gouin	1989	3rd term
Robert Kieffer	Parti Québécois	Groulx	1994	2nd term
Louise Harel	Parti Québécois	Hochelaga-Maisonneuve	1981	5th term
Roch Cholette	Libéral	Hull	1998	1st term
Jean-Paul Bergeron	Parti Québécois	Iberville	1998	1st term
Maxime Arseneau	Parti Québécois	Îles-de-la-Madeleine	1998	1st term
Geoffrey Kelley	Libéral	Jacques-Cartier	1994	2nd term
Michel Bissonnet	Libéral	Jeanne-Mance	1981	5th term
Margaret F. Delisle	Libéral	Jean-Talon	1994	2nd term
Claude Boucher	Parti Québécois	Johnson	1994	2nd term
Guy Chevrette	Parti Québécois	Joliette	1976	6th term
Sylvie Lespérance (2002)	ADQ	Joliette	2002	1st term
Lucien Bouchard	Parti Québécois	Jonquière	1996	2nd term
Françoise Gauthier (2001)	Libéral	Jonquière	2001	1st term
Claude Béchard	Libéral	Kamouraska-Témiscouata	1997	2nd term
Jacques Léonard	Parti Québécois	Labelle	1976, 1989	5th term*
Sylvain Pagé (2001)	Parti Québécois	Labelle	2001	1st term
Jacques Brassard	Parti Québécois	Lac-Saint-Jean	1976	6th term
Stéphan Tremblay (2002)	Parti Québécois	Lac-Saint-Jean	2002	1st term
Jean-Claude Gobé	Libéral	LaFontaine	1985	4th term
Jean-Claude Gobé	Independent	LaFontaine	1985	4th term
Michel Côté	Parti Québécois	La Peltrie	1994	2nd term
Fatima Houda-Pepin	Libéral	La Pinière	1994	2nd term
André Bourbeau	Libéral	Laporte	1981	5th term
Serge Geoffrion	Parti Québécois	La Prairie	1998	1st term
Jean-Claude St-André	Parti Québécois	L'Assomption	1996	2nd term
Christos Sirros	Libéral	Laurier-Dorion	1981	5th term
Serge Ménard	Parti Québécois	Laval-des-Rapides	1993	3rd term
Jean-Pierre Jolivet	Parti Québécois	Laviolette	1976	6th term
Julie Boulet (2001)	Libéral	Laviolette	2001	1st term
Linda Goupil	Parti Québécois	Lévis	1998	1st term
Michel Després	Libéral	Limoilou	1985, 1998	3rd term*
Jean-Guy Paré	Parti Québécois	Lotbinière	1994	2nd term
Paul Bégin	Parti Québécois	Louis-Hébert	1994	2nd term
Paul Bégin	Independent	Louis-Hébert	1994	2nd term
Monique Jérôme-Forget	Libéral	Marguerite-Bourgeoys	1998	1st term
François Beaulne	Parti Québécois	Marguerite-D'Youville	1989	3rd term
Cécile Vermette	Parti Québécois	Marie-Victorin	1985	4th term
François Ouimet	Libéral	Marquette	1994	2nd term
Rémy Désilets	Parti Québécois	Maskinongé	1994	2nd term
Gilles Labbé (elected on December 14, 1998)	Parti Québécois	Masson	1998	1st term
Matthias Rioux	Parti Québécois	Matane	1994	2nd term
Danielle Doyer	Parti Québécois	Matapédia	1994	2nd term
Madeleine Bélanger	Libéral	Mégantic-Compton	1983	5th term
Robert Perreault	Parti Québécois	Mercier	1994	2nd term
Nathalie Rochefort (2001)	Libéral	Mercier	2001	1st term
Lyse Leduc	Parti Québécois	Mille-Îles	1994	2nd term
Réal Gauvin	Libéral	Montmagny-L'Islet	1985	4th term
Jean-François Simard	Parti Québécois	Montmorency	1998	1st term
André Tranchemontagne	Libéral	Mont-Royal	1998	1st term
Russell Williams	Libéral	Nelligan	1989	3rd term
Michel Morin	Parti Québécois	Nicolet-Yamaska	1994	2nd term
Russell Copeman	Libéral	Notre-Dame-de-Grâce	1994	2nd term
Robert Benoit	Libéral	Orford	1989	3rd term
Pierre-Étienne Laporte	Libéral	Outremont	1996	2nd term
Norman MacMillan	Libéral	Papineau	1989	3rd term
Nicole Léger	Parti Québécois	Pointe-aux-Trembles	1996	2nd term
Robert Middlemiss	Libéral	Pontiac	1981	5th term
Roger Bertrand	Parti Québécois	Portneuf	1993	3rd term
Lucie Papineau	Parti Québécois	Prévost	1997	2nd term
Sylvain Simard	Parti Québécois	Richelieu	1994	2nd term
Yvon Vallières	Libéral	Richmond	1973, 1981	6th term*
Solange Charest	Parti Québécois	Rimouski	1994	2nd term
Mario Dumont	ADQ	Rivière-du-Loup	1994	2nd term
Pierre Marsan	Libéral	Robert-Baldwin	1994	2nd term
Benoît Laprise	Parti Québécois	Roberval	1994	2nd term
Rita Dionne-Marsolais	Parti Québécois	Rosemont	1994	2nd term
François Legault	Parti Québécois	Rousseau	1998	1st term
Rémy Trudel	Parti Québécois	Rouyn-Noranda–Témiscamingue	1989	3rd term
Gabriel-Yvan Gagnon	Parti Québécois	Saguenay	1994	2nd term
François Corriveau (2002)	ADQ	Saguenay	2002	1st term
Monique Gagnon-Tremblay	Libéral	Saint-François	1985	4th term
Nicole Loiselle	Libéral	Saint-Henri–Sainte-Anne	1989	3rd term
Léandre Dion	Parti Québécois	Saint-Hyacinthe	1994	2nd term
Roger Paquin	Parti Québécois	Saint-Jean	1994	2nd term
Jacques Dupuis	Libéral	Saint-Laurent	1998	1st term
André Boulerice	Parti Québécois	Sainte-Marie–Saint-Jacques	1985	4th term
Claude Pinard	Parti Québécois	Saint-Maurice	1994	2nd term
Serge Deslières	Parti Québécois	Salaberry-Soulanges	1994	2nd term
Line Beauchamp	Libéral	Sauvé	1998	1st term
Bernard Brodeur	Libéral	Shefford	1994	3rd term
Jean Charest	Libéral	Sherbrooke	1998	1st term
Pauline Marois	Parti Québécois	Taillon	1981, (Note: La Peltrie) 1989	4th term*
Agnès Maltais	Parti Québécois	Taschereau	1998	1st term
Jocelyne Caron	Parti Québécois	Terrebonne	1989	3rd term
Guy Julien	Parti Québécois	Trois-Rivières	1994	2nd term
Michel Létourneau	Parti Québécois	Ungava	1994	2nd term
David Payne	Parti Québécois	Vachon	1981, 1994	3rd term*
Diane Barbeau	Parti Québécois	Vanier	1994	2nd term
Yvon Marcoux	Libéral	Vaudreuil	1998	1st term
Bernard Landry	Parti Québécois	Verchères	1976, (Note: Fabre) 1994	4th term*
Henri-François Gautrin	Libéral	Verdun	1989	3rd term
William Cusano	Libéral	Viau	1981	5th term
Cosmo Maciocia	Libéral	Viger	1981	5th term
Anna Mancuso (2002)	Libéral	Viger	2002	1st term
David Cliche	Parti Québécois	Vimont	1994	2nd term
François Gaudreau (2002)	ADQ	Vimont	2002	1st term
Jacques Chagnon	Libéral	Westmount–Saint-Louis	1985	4th term

== Other elected MNAs ==
Other MNAs were elected in by-elections during this mandate

- Nathalie Rochefort, Quebec Liberal Party, Mercier, April 9, 2001
- Richard Legendre, Parti Québécois, Blainville, October 1, 2001
- Françoise Gauthier, Quebec Liberal Party, Jonquière, October 1, 2001
- Sylvain Pagé, Parti Québécois, Labelle, October 1, 2001
- Julie Boulet, Quebec Liberal Party, Laviolette, October 1, 2001
- Lise Thériault, Quebec Liberal Party, Anjou, April 15, 2002
- François Corriveau, Action démocratique du Québec, Saguenay, April 15, 2002,
- Anna Mancuso, Quebec Liberal Party, Viger, April 15, 2002
- Marie Grégoire, Action démocratique du Québec, Berthier, June 17, 2002
- Sylvie Lespérance, Action démocratique du Québec, Joliette, June 17, 2002
- Stéphan Tremblay, Parti Québécois, Lac-Saint-Jean, June 17, 2002
- François Gaudreau, Action démocratique du Québec, Vimont, June 17, 2002

== Cabinet Ministers ==
=== Bouchard Cabinet (1998–2001) ===
- Prime Minister and Executive Council President: Lucien Bouchard
- Deputy Premier: Bernard Landry
- Agriculture, Fisheries and Food: Rémy Trudel
- Social Solidarity: André Boisclair
- Labor and Employment: Diane Lemieux
- President of the Treasury Board, Administration and Public Office: Jacques Léonard
- Information Highway and Government Services: David Cliche
- Culture and Communications: Agnès Maltais
- International Relations: Louise Beaudoin
- Indian Affairs: Guy Cheverette
- Health and Social Services: Pauline Marois
- Health, Social Services and Youth Protection (Delegate): Gilles Baril
- Education and Youth (State Minister): François Legault
- Education: François Legault
- Family and Children: Pauline Marois, Nicole Léger (Delegate)
- Transportation: Guy Chevrette, Jacques Baril (Delegate)
- Canadian Intergovernmental Affairs: Joseph Facal
- Municipal Affairs and Metropole: Louise Harel
- Relations with the Citizens and Immigration: Robert Perreault (1998–2000), Sylvain Simard (2000–2001)
- Tourism: Maxime Arseneau
- Environment: Paul Bégin
- Natural Resources: Jacques Brassard
- Regions: Jean-Pierre Jolivet
- Justice: Linda Goupil
- Public Safety: Serge Ménard
- Finances: Bernard Landry
- Economy and Finances (State Minister): Bernard Landry
- Revenue: Rita Dionne-Marsolais (1998–1999), Bernard Landry (1999), Paul Bégin (1999–2001)
- Industry and Commerce: Bernard Landry, Guy Julien (Delegate)

=== Landry Cabinet (2001–2003) ===
- Prime Minister and Executive Council President: Bernard Landry
- Deputy Premier: Pauline Marois
- Agriculture, Fisheries and Food: Maxime Arseneau
- Employment and Social Solidarity: Jean Rochon (2001)
- Employment (Delegate): Agnès Maltais (2001)
  - Social Solidarity: Jean Rochon (2001–2002), Linda Goupil (2002–2003)
  - Labor, Employment and Social Solidarity (State Minister): Jean Rochon (2001–2003)
    - Labor and Social Solidarity (State Minister): Jean Rochon (2001)
- Labor: Jean Rochon
- Human Resources and Labour (State Minister): Jean Rochon (2002–2003)
- President of the Treasury Board, Administration and Public Office: Sylvain Simard (2001–2002), Joseph Facal (2002–2003)
- Renewal of the Public Office (Secretary of State): Stéphane Bedard (2002–2003)
- Culture and Communications: Diane Lemieux
- International Relations: Louise Beaudoin
- Indian Affairs: Guy Cheverette (2001–2002), Rémy Trudel (2002), Michel Létourneau (2002–2003)
- Health and Social Services: Rémy Trudel (2001–2002), François Legault (2002–2003), David Levine (Delegate) (2002–2003)
- Health, Social Services and Youth Protection (Delegate): Agnès Maltais (2001–2002)
  - Health, Social Services, Youth Protection and Rehabilitation: Roger Bertrand (2002–2003)
- Housing: Jacques Côté (2002–2003)
- Education and Youth (State Minister): François Legault
- Education and Employment (State Minister): François Legault (2001–2002), Sylvain Simard (2002–2003)
- Education: Francois Legault (2001–2002), Sylvain Simard (2002–2003)
- Family and Children: Linda Goupil
- Social Solidarity, Family and Children (State Minister): Linda Goupil (2002–2003)
- Fight Against Poverty and Discrimination: Nicole Léger
- Status of Women: Jocelyne Caron
- Transportation: Guy Chevrette (2001–2002), Serge Ménard (2002–2003)
- Transportation and Maritime Policies (Delegate): Jacques Baril
- Canadian Intergovernmental Affairs: Joseph Facal (2001–2002), Jean-Pierre Charbonneau (2002–2003)
- Municipal Affairs and Metropole: Louise Harel (2001–2002), André Boisclair (2002–2003)
- Municipal Infrastructures: Claude Boucher
- Capitale-Nationale: Rosaire Bertrand (2001–2003)
- Immigration Initiation and Integration (State Minister): André Boulerice
- Relations with the Citizens and Immigration: Joseph Facal (2001–2002), Rémy Trudel (2002–2003), André Boulerice (Delegate) (2002–2003)
- Democratic Institutions Reform: Jean-Pierre Charbonneau (2002–2003)
- Tourism, Recreation and Sport: Richard Legendre
- Environment: André Boisclair
- Environment and Water: André Boisclair (State Minister) (2001–2002), Jean-François Simard (2002–2003)
- Natural Resources: Jacques Brassard (2001–2002), Gilles Baril (2002), François Gendron (2002–2003), Rita Dionne-Marsolais (Delegate) (2001–2003)
- Natural Resources (State Minister): Gilles Baril (2002–2003)
- Energy: Rita Dionne-Marsolais: (2002–2003)
- Forest Management and Rural Regions: François Gendron (2002–2003)
- Regions: Gilles Baril (2001–2002), Remy Trudel (2002–2003)
- Resource Regions (Secretary of State: Lucie Papineau)
- Population and Indian Affairs:Remy Trudel (2002)
  - Population, Regions and Indian Affairs (State Minister): Remy Trudel (2002–2003)
- Northern Quebec development: Michel Letourneau (2002–2003)
- Justice: Paul Bégin (2001–2002), Normand Jutras (2002–2003)
- Public Safety: Serge Ménard (2001–2002, 2002–2003), Normand Jutras (2002)
- Finances: Pauline Marois (2001–2002)
- Economy and Finances (State Minister): Pauline Marois (2001–2002)
- Industry and Commerce: Gilles Baril (2001–2002), Pauline Marois (2002), Lucie Papineau (Delegate) (2002–2003)
- Research, Science and Technology: Pauline Marois, David Cliche (Delegate), Solange Charest (Secretary of State) (2002–2003)
  - Finances, Economy and Research: Pauline Marois (2002–2003)
- Revenue: Guy Julien

== New electoral districts ==
An electoral map reform was made in 2001 and went into effect for the 2003 election.

The following electoral districts were created:

- Beauharnois
- Bourassa-Sauvé
- Huntingdon
- Jean-Lesage
- Jeanne-Mance–Viger
- Mirabel

The following electoral districts disappeared:

- Beauharnois-Huntingdon
- Bourassa
- Jeanne-Mance
- Limoilou
- Salaberry-Soulanges
- Sauvé

The following electoral district was renamed:

- Saguenay was renamed René-Lévesque; its territory was unchanged.
