= 2002 Quebec provincial by-elections =

Provincial by-elections were held in Quebec in 2002, on the following dates:

== April 15 ==
Elections were held in the Quebec provincial electoral districts of Anjou, Saguenay and Viger. They resulted in the election of two Liberals and one ADQ Member to the National Assembly of Quebec.

The Liberals unsurprisingly won clear victories in two Montreal-based districts:

- Lise Thériault in Anjou;
- Anna Mancuso in Viger.

For the first time ever, an ADQ candidate other than Mario Dumont was sent to the National Assembly of Quebec: François Corriveau won the election in the district of Saguenay, one of the Parti Québécois's traditional strongholds. Corriveau's showing temporarily boosted the ADQ's poll numbers and led to another series of ADQ by-election victories two months later, on June 17, 2002.

== June 17 ==
Elections were held in the Quebec provincial electoral districts of Berthier, Joliette, Lac-Saint-Jean and Vimont. They resulted in the election of three ADQ and one PQ Member to the National Assembly of Quebec.

For the first time ever, the ADQ, which received 45% of the popular vote saw its representation at the provincial legislature increased to five MNAs, with the addition of François Gaudreau (Vimont), Marie Grégoire (Berthier) and Sylvie Lespérance (Joliette) to their delegation.

PQ candidate and BQ MP Stéphan Tremblay won a slight victory over ADQ candidate Jocelyn Fradette in Lac-Saint-Jean.

His colleague Michel Bellehumeur lost the election to Lespérance in Joliette.

The PQ candidates received 29% of the total vote; the Liberals, 24%.

The by-elections took place at a time when the ADQ was enjoying a high level of popularity throughout Quebec.

By 2003, however, the ADQ had sunk in the polls, and none of their three newly elected MNAs were re-elected.
