= François Benjamin =

Canadian politician (born 1962)

MNA for Berthier
- In office April 25, 2007 – November 5, 2008
- Preceded by: Alexandre Bourdeau
- Succeeded by: André Villeneuve

Mayor of Mandeville
- In office 1999–2007
- Preceded by: Roland Rocheleau
- Succeeded by: Francine Bergeron

Personal details
- Born: April 18, 1962 (age 64) Montreal, Quebec, Canada
- Party: CAQ; ADQ
- Spouse: Line Léveillé

François Benjamin (born April 18, 1962) is a Canadian politician in Quebec. He was an Action démocratique du Québec (ADQ) Member of the National Assembly for the electoral district of Berthier from 2007 to 2008.

Benjamin was born in Montreal, Quebec. From 1999 until his election as MNA, he served as mayor of Mandeville and was the prefect for D'Autray Regional County Municipality. He also worked for Arcon Canada as a supervisor, for Canada Post as an entrepreneur and for Cité-Amérique as a supervisor for the technical production for the movie Séraphin: Heart of Stone (Séraphin: un homme et son péché) that was filmed in Mandeville in 2002.

Benjamin was first elected to the National Assembly in the 2007 election with 42% of the vote. Parti Québécois (PQ) incumbent Alexandre Bourdeau finished second with 35% of the vote. He took office on April 12, 2007 and became the Official Opposition's Shadow Minister for Culture and Communications on April 19, 2007.

Before joining the ADQ and CAQ, Benjamin supported the PQ.

In the 2012 election, he ran unsuccessfully for the CAQ in Berthier.

== Footnotes ==
Political offices
Preceded by Daniel Turp (PQ)	Official Opposition's Shadow Minister for Culture and Communications; 2007–Current	Succeeded by Incumbent
