= René-Lévesque =

Provincial electoral district in Quebec, Canada

Coordinates: 50.03°N 68.74°W

Quebec electoral district

Provincial electoral district
- Legislature: National Assembly of Quebec
MNA
Odette Lavigne
Parti Québécois
- District created: 1945
- First contested: 1948
- Last contested: 2026

Demographics
- Population (2006): 45,355
- Electors (2014): 34,459
- Area (km²): 57,755.3
- Pop. density (per km²): 0.79
- Census division(s): La Haute-Côte-Nord, Manicouagan
- Census subdivision(s): Baie-Comeau, Baie-Trinité, Chute-aux-Outardes, Colombier, Forestville, Franquelin, Godbout, Les Bergeronnes, Les Escoumins, Longue-Rive, Pointe-aux-Outardes, Pointe-Lebel, Portneuf-sur-Mer, Ragueneau, Sacré-Coeur, Tadoussac; Essipit, Pessamit; Lac-au-Brochet, Rivière-aux-Outardes

René-Lévesque is a provincial electoral district in the Côte-Nord region of Quebec, Canada, which elects members to the National Assembly of Quebec. It notably includes the municipalities of Baie-Comeau, Forestville and Pointe-Lebel as well as the reserve of Pessamit.

It was created for the 1948 election under the name Saguenay from part of the former Charlevoix–Saguenay electoral district. The predecessor to Charlevoix-Saguenay (before 1912) was Chicoutimi-Saguenay. Despite its former name, the district has not included the Saguenay–Lac-Saint-Jean region since at least the 1994 election.

It was renamed René-Lévesque for the 2003 election, after former Quebec Premier René Lévesque, although its territory was unchanged. It remained unchanged after the change from the 2001 to the 2011 electoral map.

== Members of the National Assembly ==
Legislature	Years	Member	Party
Saguenay; Riding created from Charlevoix—Saguenay
23rd	1948–1952	Pierre Ouellet	Union Nationale
24th	1952–1956	Pierre Ouellet	Union Nationale
25th	1956–1960	Pierre Ouellet	Union Nationale
26th	1960–1962	Lucien Belanger	Liberal
27th	1962–1963	Rodrigue Thibault	Liberal
27th	1964–1966	Pierre-Willie Maltais	Liberal
28th	1966–1970	Pierre-Willie Maltais	Liberal
29th	1970–1973	Lucien Lessard	Parti Québécois
30th	1973–1976	Lucien Lessard	Parti Québécois
31st	1976–1981	Lucien Lessard	Parti Québécois
32nd	1981–1982	Lucien Lessard	Parti Québécois
32nd	1983–1985	Ghislain Maltais	Liberal
33rd	1985–1989	Ghislain Maltais	Liberal
34th	1989–1994	Ghislain Maltais	Liberal
35th	1994–1998	Gabriel-Yvan Gagnon	Parti Québécois
36th	1998–2001	Gabriel-Yvan Gagnon	Parti Québécois
36th	2002–2003	François Corriveau	Action démocratique
René-Lévesque
37th	2003–2007	Marjolain Dufour	Parti Québécois
38th	2007–2008	Marjolain Dufour	Parti Québécois
39th	2008–2012	Marjolain Dufour	Parti Québécois
40th	2012–2014	Marjolain Dufour	Parti Québécois
41st	2014–2015	Marjolain Dufour	Parti Québécois
41st	2015–2018	Martin Ouellet	Parti Québécois
42nd	2018–2022	Martin Ouellet	Parti Québécois
43rd	2022–2026	Yves Montigny	Coalition Avenir Québec
44th	2026–Present	Odette Lavigne	Parti Québécois

== Election results ==
=== René-Lévesque, 2001 - present ===
2026 Quebec general election
** Preliminary results — Not yet official **
Party	Candidate	Votes	%	±%
Parti Québécois	Odette Lavigne	9,415	50.72	+29.56
Coalition Avenir Québec	Yves Montigny	3,213	17.31	-41.61
Conservative	Esther Besrest	2,541	13.69	+3.56
Québec solidaire	Philippe C.-Boudreau	1,365	7.35	-0.20
Démocratie directe	Kevin Grenier	1,130	6.09	
Liberal	William Huynh-Jan	898	4.84	+3.25
Total valid votes		18,562	98.36	
Total rejected ballots		309	1.65	+0.65
Turnout		18,871	58.91	-1.02
Electors on the lists		32,035		
Parti Québécois gain from Coalition Avenir Québec		Swing		+35.58
Source: Élections Québec

2022 Quebec general election
Party	Candidate	Votes	%	±%
Coalition Avenir Québec	Yves Montigny	11,377	58.92	+25.21
Parti Québécois	Jeff Dufour Tremblay	4,087	21.17	–21.05
Conservative	Marie-Renée Raymond	1,955	10.12	+9.06
Québec solidaire	Audrey Givern-Héroux	1,459	7.56	–2.65
Liberal	Marc Duperron	307	1.59	–11.20
Climat Québec	Richard Delisle	82	0.42	New
Independent	(Philippe) Gilles Babin	42	0.22	New
Total valid votes		19,309	99.02	
Total rejected ballots		192	0.98	–0.45
Turnout		19,501	59.93	+1.18
Electors on the lists		32,540		
Coalition Avenir Québec gain from Parti Québécois		Swing		+23.13
Source: Élections Québec

2018 Quebec general election
Party	Candidate	Votes	%	±%
Parti Québécois	Martin Ouellet	8,055	42.22	-6.77
Coalition Avenir Québec	André Desrosiers	6,432	33.71	+28.14
Liberal	Jonathan Lapointe	2,440	12.79	-26.22
Québec solidaire	Sandrine Bourque	1,948	10.21	+5.33
Conservative	Eric Barnabé	204	1.07	+0.19
Total valid votes		19,079	98.57	
Total rejected ballots		277	1.43	
Turnout		19,356	58.75	+19.16
Eligible voters		32,944		
Parti Québécois hold		Swing		-17.45
Source(s) "Rapport des résultats officiels du scrutin". Élections Québec.

Quebec provincial by-election, 9 November 2015
Party	Candidate	Votes	%	±%
Parti Québécois	Martin Ouellet	6,546	48.99	-6.01
Liberal	Karine Otis	5,213	39.01	+17.24
Coalition Avenir Québec	Dave Savard	744	5.57	-10.15
Québec solidaire	Claire Du Sablon	652	4.88	-1.59
Conservative	Eric Sirois	118	0.88	–
Option nationale	Yan Rivard	90	0.67	-0.36
Total valid votes		13,363	99.24	–
Total rejected ballots		102	0.76	-1.22
Turnout		13,465	39.59	-19.77
Eligible voters		34,008		
Parti Québécois hold		Swing		-11.63

By-election required due to the resignation of Marjolain Dufour, for health reasons.

2014 Quebec general election
Party	Candidate	Votes	%
Parti Québécois	Marjolain Dufour	11,029	55.00
Liberal	Michel Levesque	4,366	21.77
Coalition Avenir Québec	Marie-Christine Fortin-Morand	3,152	15.72
Québec solidaire	Marie-Pierre Clavette	1,297	6.47
Option nationale	Nicolas Boivin Ringuette	207	1.03
Total valid votes		20,051	98.02
Total rejected ballots		404	1.98
Turnout		20,455	59.36
Electors on the lists		34,459	–

2012 Quebec general election
Party	Candidate	Votes	%	±%
Parti Québécois	Marjolain Dufour	13,634	59.68	+1.25
Liberal	Pascal Chouinard	4,160	18.21	-8.33
Coalition Avenir Québec	Dereck Blouin-Perry	3,643	15.95	+3.72*
Québec solidaire	Julie Gonthier-Brazeau	892	3.90	+1.10
Option nationale	Maxime Cantin	517	2.26	–
Total valid votes		22,846	99.11	–
Total rejected ballots		204	0.89	–
Turnout		23,050	66.67	+12.24
Electors on the lists		34,575	–	–

* Result compared to Action démocratique

2008 Quebec general election
Party	Candidate	Votes	%	±%
Parti Québécois	Marjolain Dufour	10,748	58.43	+6.65
Liberal	Patrick Sullivan	4,882	26.54	+10.69
Action démocratique	Louis-Olivier Minville	2,250	12.23	-16.05
Québec solidaire	Stéphane Lessard	516	2.80	+0.99
Total valid votes		18,396	98.79	–
Total rejected ballots		225	1.21	–
Turnout		18,621	54.43	-14.18
Electors on the lists		34,213	–	–

2007 Quebec general election
Party	Candidate	Votes	%	±%
Parti Québécois	Marjolain Dufour	12,160	51.78	+10.92
Action démocratique	André Desrosiers	6,642	28.28	-5.13
Liberal	François Désy	3,723	15.85	-7.84
Green	Styves Griffith	533	2.27	–
Québec solidaire	Mylène Lapierre	426	1.81	–
Total valid votes		23,484	99.27	–
Total rejected ballots		173	0.73	–
Turnout		23,657	68.61	+5.54
Electors on the lists		34,480	–	–

2003 Quebec general election
Party	Candidate	Votes	%	±%
Parti Québécois	Marjolain Dufour	8,997	40.86	+16.91
Action démocratique	François Corriveau	7,356	33.41	-14.43
Liberal	François Désy	5,215	23.69	-4.52
Independent	Jean-Pierre Brisson	449	2.04	–
Total valid votes		22,017	99.15	–
Total rejected ballots		189	0.85	–
Turnout		22,206	63.07	+2.66
Electors on the lists		35,210	–	–

=== Saguenay, 1945 - 2001 ===
Quebec provincial by-election, April 15, 2002
Party	Candidate	Votes	%	±%
Action démocratique	François Corriveau	10,129	47.84	+31.44
Liberal	Isabelle Melançon	5,973	28.21	+7.89
Parti Québécois	Louise Levasseur	5,070	23.95	-38.69
Total valid votes		21,172	99.07	–
Total rejected ballots		199	0.93	–
Turnout		21,371	60.41	-8.06
Electors on the lists		35,378	–	–

1998 Quebec general election
Party	Candidate	Votes	%
Parti Québécois	Gabriel-Yvan Gagnon	15,419	62.64
Liberal	Paul Fournier	5,001	20.32
Action démocratique	Armand Maltais	4,036	16.40
Socialist Democracy	Hélène Lévesque	159	0.65
Total valid votes		24,615	99.17
Total rejected ballots		206	0.83
Turnout		24,821	69.47
Electors on the lists		35,727	–

1995 Quebec referendum
Side	Votes	%
Oui	23,067	73.33
Non	8,389	26.67

1994 Quebec general election
Party	Candidate	Votes	%
Parti Québécois	Gabriel-Yvan Gagnon	14,439	57.44
Liberal	Georges-Henri Gagné	7,435	29.58
Action démocratique	Armand Maltais	3,264	12.98
Total valid votes		25,138	98.14
Total rejected ballots		476	1.86
Turnout		25,614	72.47
Electors on the lists		35,344	–

1992 Charlottetown Accord referendum
Side	Votes	%
Non	18,861	71.60
Oui	7,482	28.40

1989 Quebec general election
Party	Candidate	Votes	%
Liberal	Ghislain Maltais	9,273	43.45
Parti Québécois	Carol Guay	8,771	41.10
Green	Denis Hubert	3,296	15.45
Total valid votes		21,340	97.51
Total rejected ballots		545	2.49
Turnout		21,885	64.83
Electors on the lists		33,756	–

1985 Quebec general election
Party	Candidate	Votes	%
Liberal	Ghislain Maltais	11,270	48.36
Parti Québécois	Pierre Michaud	11,109	47.67
New Democratic	Jocelyn Toulouse	516	2.21
Parti indépendantiste	Carol Fiset	277	1.19
Christian Socialist	Patricia Dufour	134	0.57
Total valid votes		23,306	98.76
Total rejected ballots		293	1.24
Turnout		23,599	66.48
Electors on the lists		35,500	–

Quebec provincial by-election, 1983
Party	Candidate	Votes	%
Liberal	Ghislain Maltais	9,375	43.33
Parti Québécois	Johanne Isabel	6,130	28.33
Independent	Pierre-Willie Maltais	5,844	27.01
United Social Credit	J. Émilien Martel	287	1.33
Total valid votes		21,636	98.59
Total rejected ballots		309	1.41
Turnout		21,945	62.05
Electors on the lists		35,366	–

1981 Quebec general election
Party	Candidate	Votes	%
Parti Québécois	Lucien Lessard	17,069	66.56
Liberal	Ghislain Maltais	8,139	31.74
Union Nationale	Albert N. Martin	436	1.70
Total valid votes		25,644	99.18
Total rejected ballots		212	0.82
Turnout		25,856	75.43
Electors on the lists		34,277	–

1980 Quebec referendum
Side	Votes	%
Oui	14,032	61.91
Non	8,634	38.09

1976 Quebec general election
Party	Candidate	Votes	%
Parti Québécois	Lucien Lessard	15,491	69.16
Liberal	Jean-Guy Tremblay	4,279	19.10
Union Nationale	Réal St-Laurent	2,074	9.17
Ralliement créditiste	Camille Hélie	575	2.57
Total valid votes		22,399	97.49
Total rejected ballots		576	2.51
Turnout		22,975	78.48
Electors on the lists		29,276	–

1973 Quebec general election
Party	Candidate	Votes	%
Parti Québécois	Lucien Lessard	10,226	51.14
Liberal	Claude Perrault	7,933	39.67
Ralliement créditiste	André Fortier	1,404	7.02
Union Nationale	Gérard Vallée	327	1.64
Independent	Gaston Michaud	105	0.52
Total valid votes		19,995	98.76
Total rejected ballots		252	1.24
Turnout		20,247	72.20
Electors on the lists		28,044	–

1970 Quebec general election
Party	Candidate	Votes	%
Parti Québécois	Lucien Lessard	12,392	44.77
Liberal	Pierre-Willie Maltais	10,144	36.65
Union Nationale	Paul-André Tremblay	4,007	14.48
Ralliement créditiste	Jean-Nil Jean	1,138	4.11
Total valid votes		27,681	98.61
Total rejected ballots		391	1.39
Turnout		28,072	82.19
Electors on the lists		28,044	–

1966 Quebec general election
Party	Candidate	Votes	%
Liberal	Pierre-Willie Maltais	10,737	46.43
Union Nationale	J.-Ernest Bruyére	9,505	41.11
Ralliement national	Lucien Lessard	2,444	10.57
Independent	Odias Mimeault	437	1.89
Total valid votes		23,123	98.20
Total rejected ballots		423	1.80
Turnout		23,546	64.33
Electors on the lists		36,600	–

Quebec provincial by-election, 1964
Party	Candidate	Votes	%
Liberal	Pierre-Willie Maltais	11,919	59.45
Union Nationale	J.-Ernest Bruyére	8,130	40.55
Total valid votes		20,049	97.59
Total rejected ballots		495	2.41
Turnout		20,544	60.00
Electors on the lists		34,240	–

1962 Quebec general election
Party	Candidate	Votes	%
Liberal	Rodrigue Thibault	12,116	57.35
Union Nationale	Roland Verreault	9,010	42.65
Total valid votes		21,126	98.42
Total rejected ballots		340	1.58
Turnout		21,466	78.97
Electors on the lists		27,181	–

1960 Quebec general election
Party	Candidate	Votes	%
Liberal	Lucien Bélanger	10,475	59.14
Union Nationale	Léopold-Jean Cormier	7,238	40.86
Total valid votes		17,713	97.55
Total rejected ballots		444	2.45
Turnout		18,457	75.91
Electors on the lists		22,672	–

1956 Quebec general election
Party	Candidate	Votes	%
Union Nationale	Pierre Ouellet	10,899	58.60
Liberal	Gérard Lefrançois	7,701	41.40
Total valid votes		18,600	98.76
Total rejected ballots		233	1.24
Turnout		18,833	75.91
Electors on the lists		24,811	–

1952 Quebec general election
Party	Candidate	Votes	%
Union Nationale	Pierre Ouellet	8,977	62.55
Liberal	Rodrigue Thibault	4,923	34.30
Independent	Ange Paradis	452	3.15
Total valid votes		14,352	98.63
Total rejected ballots		199	1.37
Turnout		14,551	75.34
Electors on the lists		19,315	–

1948 Quebec general election
Party	Candidate	Votes	%
Union Nationale	Pierre Ouellet	4,726	41.11
Independent UN	Laurent Brisson	2,713	23.60
Liberal	Joseph Gauthier	2,519	21.91
Union des électeurs	Ovide Gagnon	1,274	11.08
Independent	Paul-Émile Therrien	264	2.30
Total valid votes		11,496	98.63
Total rejected ballots		160	1.37
Turnout		11,656	75.15
Electors on the lists		15,511	–

== See also ==
- List of Quebec provincial electoral districts
- Canadian provincial electoral districts
