= Odette Lavigne =

Odette Lavigne MNA

Member of the National Assembly for René-Lévesque
- Incumbent
- Assumed office October 5, 2026
- Preceded by: Yves Montigny

Personal details
- Party: Parti Québécois

Odette Lavigne is a Quebec politician who was the elected to the National Assembly of Quebec for René-Lévesque in the 2026 Quebec general election as a member of the Parti Québécois (PQ).

== Biography ==
Lavigne is originally from Laval. She was the PQ candidate in Viau in 2014, then in Fabre in 2018. She had previously been the coordinator of the Côte-Nord Higher Education Hub since 2024.

== Electoral record ==
=== Provincial ===
2026 Quebec general election: René-Lévesque
** Preliminary results — Not yet official **
Party	Candidate	Votes	%	±%
Parti Québécois	Odette Lavigne	9,415	50.72	+29.56
Coalition Avenir Québec	Yves Montigny	3,213	17.31	-41.61
Conservative	Esther Besrest	2,541	13.69	+3.56
Québec solidaire	Philippe C.-Boudreau	1,365	7.35	-0.20
Démocratie directe	Kevin Grenier	1,130	6.09	
Liberal	William Huynh-Jan	898	4.84	+3.25
Total valid votes		18,562	98.36	
Total rejected ballots		309	1.65	+0.65
Turnout		18,871	58.91	-1.02
Electors on the lists		32,035		
Parti Québécois gain from Coalition Avenir Québec		Swing		+35.58
Source: Élections Québec
