= Yves Montigny =

Canadian politician

Yves Montigny MNA

Member of the National Assembly of Quebec for René-Lévesque
- In office October 18, 2022 – October 5, 2026
- Preceded by: Martin Ouellet
- Succeeded by: Odette Lavigne

Personal details
- Born: 1971 (age 54–55) Baie-Comeau, Quebec, Canada
- Party: Coalition Avenir Québec

Yves Montigny is a Canadian politician, who was elected to the National Assembly of Quebec in the 2022 Quebec general election. He represented the riding of René-Lévesque as a member of the Coalition Avenir Québec until 2026.

Prior to his election to the legislature, Montigny was the mayor of Baie-Comeau.

== Electoral record ==
=== Provincial ===
2026 Quebec general election: René-Lévesque
** Preliminary results — Not yet official **
Party	Candidate	Votes	%	±%
Parti Québécois	Odette Lavigne	9,415	50.72	+29.56
Coalition Avenir Québec	Yves Montigny	3,213	17.31	-41.61
Conservative	Esther Besrest	2,541	13.69	+3.56
Québec solidaire	Philippe C.-Boudreau	1,365	7.35	-0.20
Démocratie directe	Kevin Grenier	1,130	6.09	
Liberal	William Huynh-Jan	898	4.84	+3.25
Total valid votes		18,562	98.36	
Total rejected ballots		309	1.65	+0.65
Turnout		18,871	58.91	-1.02
Electors on the lists		32,035		
Parti Québécois gain from Coalition Avenir Québec		Swing		+35.58
Source: Élections Québec

2022 Quebec general election: René-Lévesque
Party	Candidate	Votes	%	±%
Coalition Avenir Québec	Yves Montigny	11,377	58.92	+25.21
Parti Québécois	Jeff Dufour Tremblay	4,087	21.17	–21.05
Conservative	Marie-Renée Raymond	1,955	10.12	+9.06
Québec solidaire	Audrey Givern-Héroux	1,459	7.56	–2.65
Liberal	Marc Duperron	307	1.59	–11.20
Climat Québec	Richard Delisle	82	0.42	New
Independent	(Philippe) Gilles Babin	42	0.22	New
Total valid votes		19,309	99.02	
Total rejected ballots		192	0.98	–0.45
Turnout		19,501	59.93	+1.18
Electors on the lists		32,540		
Coalition Avenir Québec gain from Parti Québécois		Swing		+23.13
Source: Élections Québec
