= Marjolain Dufour =

Canadian politician

MNA for René-Lévesque
- In office April 14, 2003 – September 3, 2015
- Preceded by: François Corriveau
- Succeeded by: Martin Ouellet

Personal details
- Born: November 28, 1958 (age 67) Baie-Comeau, Quebec
- Party: Parti Québécois
- Portfolio: Labour

Marjolain Dufour (born November 28, 1958, in Baie-Comeau, Quebec) is a former politician in Canada, who was a Parti Québécois member of the National Assembly of Quebec, representing the electoral district of René-Lévesque in the Côte-Nord region, from 2003 to 2015.

== Career ==
Dufour worked from 1977 to 1998 at Alcoa in Baie-Comeau and was the regional president of the trade union group the Confédération des syndicats nationaux (CSN) for six years and the vice-president of the aluminum union group of Baie-Comeau.

Dufour was elected in the 2003 election in the riding of René-Lévesque and was named the opposition critic for labour.

=== Resignation ===
He announced his resignation from the legislature, citing health reasons, in September 2015.
