= Alexandre Bourdeau =

Canadian politician and public administrator

Alexandre Bourdeau (born March 15, 1978) Canadian politician and public administrator in Quebec. He served in the 37th National Assembly of Quebec.

== Life and career ==
Bourdeau was born in Le Gardeur, Quebec. Bourdeau earned a bachelor's degree in political science from the University of Montreal in 2003, after obtaining a diploma of collegial studies in the natural sciences at CEGEP of L'Assomption and Collège Montmorency. He later pursued a Master of Public Administration concentration in Public Management at ENAP.

In the 2003 Quebec general election, he was elected a Member of Parliament to the National Assembly of Quebec in Berthier under the banner of the Parti Québécois. His predecessor was Marie Grégoire. He was the third youngest elected member in the history of the National Assembly of Quebec. He served as spokesperson for the official opposition and as president of youth caucus of the Lanaudière region. Bourdeau lost to ADQ candidate François Benjamin in the 2007 Quebec general election.

From August 2007 to September 2009, he was Deputy Director at the regional CEGEP of Lanaudière in Joliette. In February 2010, he was appointed Director of the regional grouping of Montreal's Association of health facilities and social services.

He married Véronique Poulin, and they have one son.
