= Gabriel-Yvan Gagnon =

Canadian politician

Member of the National Assembly of Quebec for Saguenay
- In office September 12, 1994 – September 16, 2001
- Preceded by: Ghislain Maltais
- Succeeded by: François Corriveau

Personal details
- Born: October 27, 1951 (age 74) Forestville, Quebec
- Party: Parti Québécois
- Profession: Lawyer

Gabriel-Yvan Gagnon (born October 27, 1951) is a Quebec politician who served as the member for Saguenay in the Parti Québécois from 1994 until 2001

== Biography ==
Gagnon earned a law degree from Université Laval in 1975 and was admitted to the bar in 1976. He worked as a private secretary to then Minister of Transport Lucien Lessard in the René Lévesque government and then served as the clerk and general counsel for the City of Baie-Comeau.

== Political career ==
Gagnon ran in the riding of Saguenay in 1994 and won. He served as a backbench supporter in the Parizeau government.

Gagnon was re-elected in 1998 and went on to serve as Parliamentary assistant to the minister responsible for the North Shore region in 1998 for the Lucien Bouchard government. He then became Parliamentary assistant to the Minister of the Environment serving in both the Bouchard and Bernard Landry governments until resigning on September 16, 2001, to become the industrial commissioner for the City of Baie-Comeau. Since 2008, he has worked as an air liaison for an airline.

== Electoral record ==
=== Provincial ===
1998 Quebec general election
Party	Candidate	Votes	%
Parti Québécois	Gabriel-Yvan Gagnon	15,419	62.64
Liberal	Paul Fournier	5,001	20.32
Action démocratique	Armand Maltais	4,036	16.40
Socialist Democracy	Hélène Lévesque	159	0.65
Total valid votes		24,615	99.17
Total rejected ballots		206	0.83
Turnout		24,821	69.47
Electors on the lists		35,727	–

1994 Quebec general election
Party	Candidate	Votes	%
Parti Québécois	Gabriel-Yvan Gagnon	14,439	57.44
Liberal	Georges-Henri Gagné	7,435	29.58
Action démocratique	Armand Maltais	3,264	12.98
Total valid votes		25,138	98.14
Total rejected ballots		476	1.86
Turnout		25,614	72.47
Electors on the lists		35,344	–
