= Martin Ouellet =

Canadian politician

Martin Ouellet MNA

Member of the National Assembly of Quebec for René-Lévesque
- In office November 9, 2015 – August 28, 2022
- Preceded by: Marjolain Dufour
- Succeeded by: Yves Montigny

Personal details
- Party: Parti Québécois

Martin Ouellet is a Canadian politician. He was elected to the National Assembly of Quebec in a by-election on November 9, 2015. He represented the electoral district of René-Lévesque as a member of the Parti Québécois.
