= Ghislain Maltais =

Canadian politician

The Honourable Ghislain Maltais
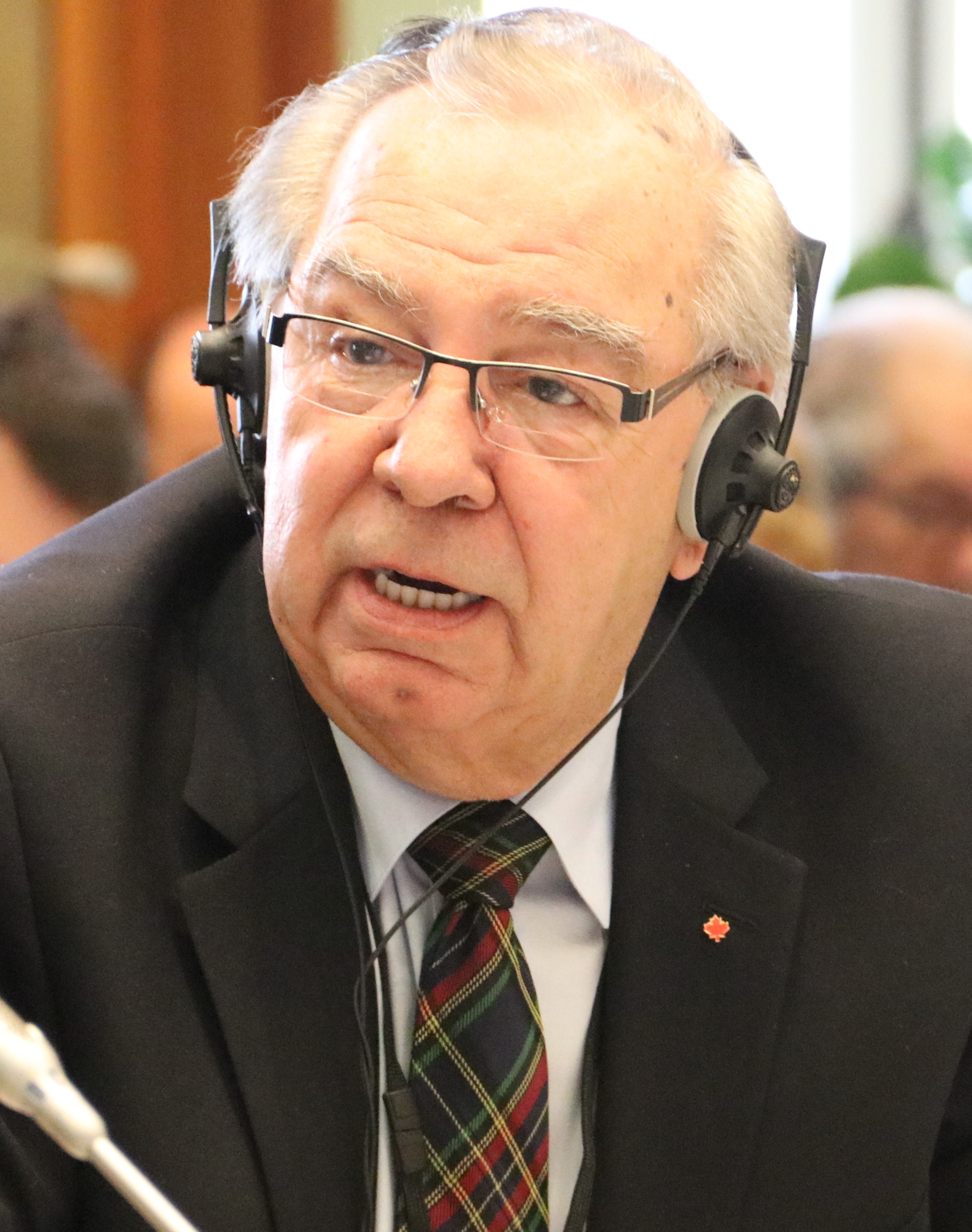
- Maltais in 2017

Canadian Senator from Quebec (Shawinegan)
- In office January 6, 2012 – April 22, 2019
- Nominated by: Stephen Harper
- Appointed by: David Johnston
- Preceded by: Lucie Pépin (2011)
- Succeeded by: Tony Loffreda

Member of the National Assembly of Quebec for Saguenay
- In office June 20, 1983 – September 12, 1994
- Preceded by: Lucien Lessard (1982)
- Succeeded by: Gabriel-Yvan Gagnon

Personal details
- Born: April 22, 1944 (age 81) Sacré-Coeur, Quebec, Canada
- Party: Conservative (federal); Quebec Liberal (provincial)

Ghislain Maltais (born April 22, 1944) is a Canadian politician. He served in the Senate of Canada from January 6, 2012 to April 22, 2019 as a Conservative representing the Senate division of Shawinegan (Quebec).

== Early life and education ==
He was born in Sacré-Coeur, Quebec and studied at the Université du Québec à Rimouski.

== Political career ==
Maltais was an unsuccessful Liberal candidate in the 1981 Quebec election, but won a by-election on June 20, 1983. He was a member of the Quebec National Assembly representing Saguenay from 1983 until 1994, when he did not run for re-election. He was an unsuccessful Liberal candidate in the 1997 federal election in Charlevoix.

Prior to being appointed to the Senate by Stephen Harper, Maltais was a political organizer for the Conservative Party of Canada. He worked on contract for the Conservative Party from 2006 to 2007, and has been the director of the Conservative Party in Quebec since 2009.
