= Marie Grégoire =

Canadian politician

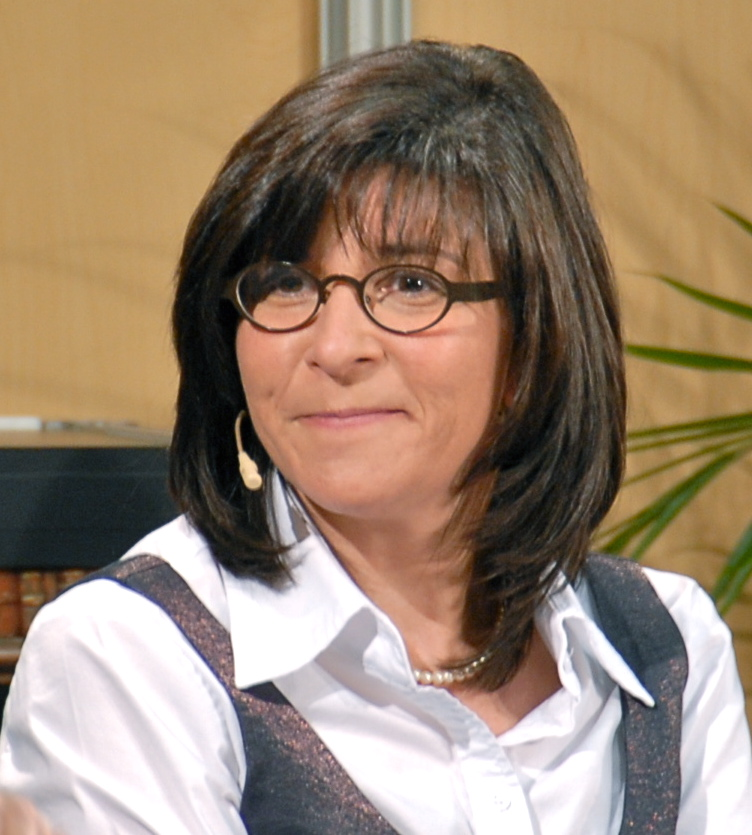
Marie Grégoire

Marie Grégoire (born August 15, 1965) was the Action démocratique du Québec Member of the National Assembly of Quebec, Canada, for the electoral district of Berthier from 2002 to 2003.

Grégoire was first elected to the National Assembly in a by-election held on June 17, 2002 with 51% of the vote. Parti Québécois (PQ) star candidate David Levine finished second with 28% of the vote.

In the 2003 election, Grégoire finished second with 32% of the vote, behind PQ candidate Alexandre Bourdeau (35%).

During the 2007 campaign and since then, Grégoire has been a regular panelist on the Réseau de l'Information's news program Le Club des Ex, along with former political opponents Liza Frulla of the Liberal Party and Jean-Pierre Charbonneau of the PQ.

In April 2007, she signed a manifesto that urges Quebec to choose an electoral system in which a significant number of seats would be determined by proportional representation instead of plurality.

== Footnotes ==
National Assembly of Quebec
Preceded by Gilles Baril	MNA, District of Berthier; 2002–2003	Succeeded by Alexandre Bourdeau (PQ)
