= Lucien Lessard =

Canadian politician

Lucien Lessard (February 22, 1938 – February 28, 2024) was a politician in Quebec, Canada.

== Background ==
He was born on February 22, 1938, in Grandes-Bergeronnes. He had a Master degree from Université Laval and was an educator and a union activist.

== Member of the legislature ==
Lessard unsuccessfully ran as a Ralliement national candidate to the National Assembly of Quebec in the district of Saguenay in 1966, finishing third with 11% of the vote.

He ran as a Parti Québécois candidate and defeated Liberal incumbent Pierre-Willie Maltais in 1970. He was re-elected in 1973, 1976 and 1981.

== Cabinet Member ==
In 1976, Lessard was appointed to Premier René Lévesque's Cabinet. He served as Minister of Public Works until 1977, Minister of Transportation until 1979 and Minister of Recreation, Hunting and Fishing from 1979 to 1982, during which he helped trigger a series of controversial police raids on the Mi'gmaq community of Restigouche, a role he discussed with Alanis Obomsawin in her 1984 film Incident at Restigouche. Lessard resigned his seat and retired from politics in 1982.

== Retirement ==
He was the general manager of the Forestville, Quebec CLSC (health unit) from 1983 to 2000.

== Footnotes ==
National Assembly of Quebec
Preceded by Pierre-Willie Maltais (Liberal)	MNA for Saguenay; 1970–1982	Succeeded by Ghislain Maltais (Liberal)
