= Bernard Brodeur =

Canadian politician

Bernard Brodeur (born 1956 in Granby, Quebec) is a Canadian former member of the National Assembly of Quebec for Shefford.

Brodeur is a notary. He holds a bachelor's degree in Law and Notarial Law from the Université Laval. He is also the owner of a Limousin cattle breeding operation since 1985. He was chair of the Import-Export Committee of the Canadian Limousin Association from 1986 to 1987 and President of the Québec Limousin Breeders Association from 1989 to 1991.

Elected as Member for Shefford in the by-election held on February 28, 1994, Brodeur was reelected in the 1994, 1998 and 2003 general elections. He was the Official Opposition Critic for Transport. In 2004, Quebec Premier Jean Charest made him Chair of the Committee on Culture.

Brodeur was defeated in his re-election bid in the 2007 general election by ADQ candidate François Bonnardel. Bonnardel received 16,648 votes versus Brodeur's 10,897 votes.

== Electoral record ==
1998 Quebec general election: Shefford
Party	Candidate	Votes	%	±%
Liberal	Bernard Brodeur	15,503	37.28	
Parti Québécois	René Marois	15,430	37.10	
Action démocratique	Serge Nadeau	10,220	24.57	
Marxist–Leninist	Jean-Paul Bédard	173	0.42	
Natural Law	Jean Paul Lapointe	171	0.41	
Independent	José Breton	90	0.22	
Total valid votes		41,587	100.00	
Rejected and declined votes		659		
Turnout		42,246	80.62	
Electors on the lists		52,403		
Source: Official Results, Government of Quebec
