= 2003 Quebec general election =

Canadian provincial election

- April 14, 2003

125 seats in the 37th Quebec Legislature 63 seats needed for a majority
- Turnout: 70.42% (▼7.9%)
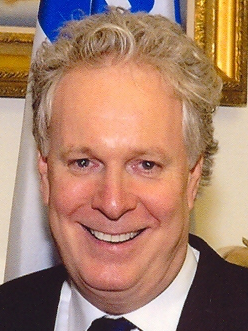

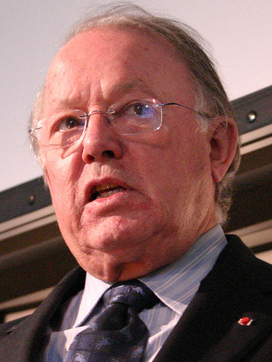

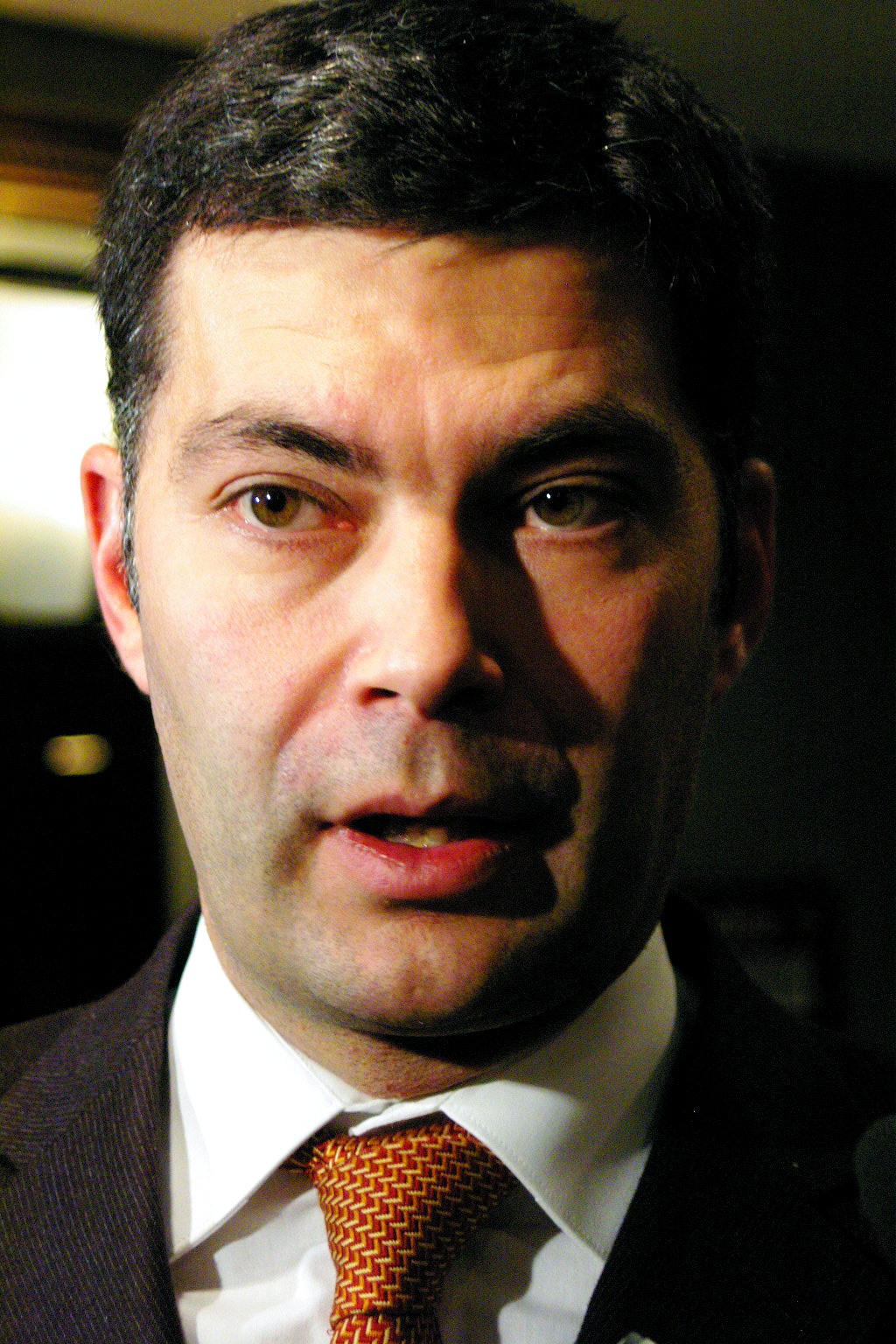
	First party	Second party	Third party
Leader	Jean Charest	Bernard Landry	Mario Dumont
Party	Liberal	Parti Québécois	Action démocratique
Leader since	April 30, 1998	March 2, 2001	May 11, 1994
Leader's seat	Sherbrooke	Verchères	Rivière-du-Loup
Last election	48 seats, 43.55%	76 seats, 42.87%	1 seat, 11.81%
Seats won	76	45	4
Seat change	▲28	▼31	▲3
Popular vote	1,755,863	1,269,183	694,122
Percentage	45.99%	33.24%	18.18%
Swing	▲2.44%	▼9.63%	▲6.37%
- Popular vote by riding. As this is an FPTP election, seat totals are not determined by popular vote, but instead via results by each riding. Click the map for more details.
Premier before election
Bernard Landry
Parti Québécois
Premier after election
Jean Charest
Liberal

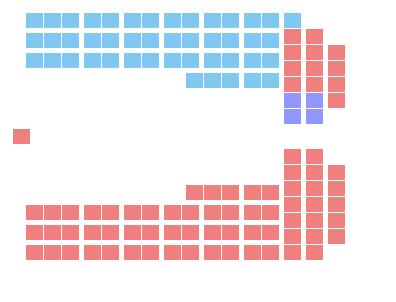

The 2003 Quebec general election was held on April 14, 2003, to elect members of the National Assembly of Quebec (Canada). The Quebec Liberal Party (PLQ), led by Jean Charest, defeated the incumbent Parti Québécois, led by Premier Bernard Landry, in a landslide.

In Champlain there was a tie between PQ candidate Noëlla Champagne and Liberal candidate Pierre-A. Brouillette; although the initial tally was 11,867 to 11,859, a judicial recount produced a tally of 11,852 each. A new election was held on May 20 and was won by Champagne by a margin of 642 votes.

== Unfolding ==
In January 2001, Lucien Bouchard announced that he would resign from public life, citing that the results of his work were not very convincing. In March 2001, the Parti Québécois selected Bernard Landry as leader by acclamation, thus becoming premier of Quebec. In 2002, the Parti Québécois (PQ) government had been in power for two mandates. It was seen as worn-out by some, and its poll numbers fell sharply. It placed third at its lowest point. An important part of its support was going to the Action Démocratique du Québec (ADQ) and its young leader, Mario Dumont. Some PQ supporters had left for the Liberal party.

Landry, leader of the PQ, undertook a revitalization of the party and its image. As the ideas of the conservative nature of ADQ's platform became more apparent, that party's popularity declined. Social democratic measures taken by the PQ government, like the passing of the "Law against poverty" helped improve the PQ's standing in the public opinion polls. PLQ leader Jean Charest initially continued to be unpopular with voters.

The 2003 election happened against the backdrop of the war in Iraq. The battles of that war took place during the first half of the campaign, diverting the attention of the media and the population. Landry became known for his custom of wearing the white ribbon (which in 2003 was worn by people in favour of peace). This custom was shortly followed by the two other main party leaders, Charest and Dumont. Landry was the most outspoken critic of the war. The other two were more discreet on the matter. Charest once stated that it was an opportunity to reaffirm his "belief in peace". Dumont acted in a similar way, while also addressing criticism to Landry, saying that Quebecers should refrain from criticizing Americans too harshly since Americans were historical friends of Quebecers.

The desire for change was considered an important factor of the campaign. However, while reminding voters that the fundamental change was at the core of its primary ideal, sovereignty, the PQ focused its message and publicity not on change, but on stability. Its campaign slogan emphasized this. Landry also tried to portray the vote as being a choice between the left wing PQ and two parties of the right. The PLQ portrayed itself as centrist. The PLQ produced dynamic ads and material, and released a new, younger logo. The ADQ put forward its young, underdog leader, and denied being too much to the right. It first broadcast a negative advertisement (a bleak television spot speaking of deaths in the hospitals) that backfired substantially, with criticism from opponents and citizens. It shortly released a brighter, more positive advertising.

Despite the PQ's recovery of support, Charest appeared as a viable alternative for people in desire of change, especially during the Leaders' Debate. Also, the Parizeau Affair sparked by Charest is said to have harmed Landry's campaign up to election day. The PQ lead in the public opinion polls vanished by mid-campaign.

The Parti Libéral won the election, while Parti Québécois won a respectable number of seats. The ADQ won four seats, which was a considerable improvement from previous general elections. It was nonetheless a disappointment for the party since it had five sitting members as a result of by-election victories in the previous year. It had also had a high standing in the polls of that same year. This was the first general election for the new left-wing Union des forces progressistes.

A documentary about Bernard Landry's point of view of the campaign was released in 2003 called À Hauteur d'homme. It was directed by Jean-Claude Labrecque.

== Issues ==
=== Health care ===
Jean Charest and the PLQ focused their campaign upon the issue of health care and reducing waiting lists. The other major parties criticized Charest for planning to invest only in health care and education, while freezing other budgets. Landry argued that money for health care would be available when the fiscal imbalance was solved by sovereignty. He vowed to fight for money from Ottawa until then, as he had done earlier that year (see the "Fiscal Imbalance", below). Charest portrayed Landry as putting sovereignty ahead of health care, and presented his party as the one that would make health care its first priority. He also accused Landry's government of using waiting lists as an administration procedure for hospitals.

=== Change ===
The desire for change was considered by the media to be a major deciding factor of the vote. The media were criticized by the PQ and some citizens as "wanting change for the sake of change", since the government had ended its term with an economy doing well and high satisfaction polls for an outgoing administration. Landry reminded voters that, while voting for his party did not change the government right away, the first ideal of the PQ, sovereignty, was "the greatest of changes". At the Leaders' Debate, Charest told viewers that those wanting change should vote for the PLQ since "A vote for the ADQ is a vote for the PQ". At the time, the ADQ was considered to be too low in the polls to be a potential victor. Charest's reminder of the spoiler effect is said to have been partly responsible for his victory on election day. The results on election day appear to have demonstrated the voters' desire for change.

=== Income tax ===
Charest presented a plan of major reduction of income tax, which Landry opposed. Quebec's income taxes are the highest in North America, but its social programs are also relatively generous, and the gap between rich and poor is the lowest of the North American continent. The ADQ presented a flat tax plan in 2002. This proved to be highly unpopular, and contributed to the image of the party as being too conservative. This plan, in its pure form, was dropped in the beginning of 2003. The ADQ claimed that, after further examination, the Quebec government did not have the resources to implement it. This, again, hurt the party further by giving it the image of flip flopping.

=== State size and intervention ===
The PQ government was criticized by the two other major parties for being too interventionist, maintaining an overly large government, and for practising statism. Dumont spoke of Landry and the PQ's "Social bureaucracy", a pun on the Social democracy the PQ defends. Landry responded to Charest and Dumont that "Quebecers do not want less state, they want better state". Dumont had previously proposed a drastic reduction in the size of the civil service, but this was also softened before the campaign.

=== Family-work conciliation ===
The conciliation famille-travail became an important issue of the campaign as a result of Landry's "Four day work-week" plan. This proposal would have required Quebec employers to offer the option of a four-day work week to parents. This was presented by the PQ as a way to enhance family life, lower the stress on parents, and of counteracting the fall in Quebec's birthrate since the Quiet Revolution. The plan was attacked by the PLQ and ADQ as being "improvised" since it was only presented near the beginning of the election. It attracted some interest and support from voters, enough for Charest to declare, days before voting day, that he could consider implementing a four-day week, although the PLQ has not mentioned this since the election.

=== Fiscal imbalance ===
The theory of a fiscal imbalance between Ottawa and Quebec City was maintained and denounced by all major parties. Charest argued that the co-operative approach of a federalist party like the PLQ would be more effective solving the problem. As proof that the PQ would be able to solve the fiscal imbalance, Landry pointed to his success of early 2003, when he, along with the English Canadian Premiers, managed to come to an agreement with Prime Minister of Canada Jean Chrétien for more money to finance health care. He promised to continue the "battle" to solve the imbalance until independence is achieved.

=== City mergers ===
The PQ government, during the premiership of Landry's predecessor Lucien Bouchard, had merged the major cities of Quebec. The government argued that the mergers would allow a better division of the wealth and responsibilities between richer suburban communities and poorer parts of the main cities. The mergers occurred despite widespread opposition in some municipalities. Many Quebecers were still disgruntled, especially in wealthier and anglophone communities. The PLQ proposed to allow referendums on de-amalgamation in communities where there was sufficient support. The PQ and the ADQ strongly opposed the idea.

=== Sovereignty and autonomy ===
While the PQ continued to promote sovereignty for Quebec with its usual arguments (dignity, culture, globalization, etc.), it was also presented by the PQ as a way to solve the fiscal imbalance problem. The ADQ made great efforts to avoid taking a position on the subject of independence in order to attract both sides of the National Question spectrum. The ADQ positioned itself as a "third way" to Quebecers between what Dumont called "radical separation" and "knelt down federalism". The ADQ had worked in favour of sovereignty during the 1995 Quebec referendum, but had been equivocal on the subject since then.

The PLQ criticized the PQ for using the politics of confrontation because of its sovereignty position, and argued that a PLQ government would restore Quebec's "leadership role" in the federation. Landry promised a third referendum on independence "in 1000 days", confirming the plan he had set out in the Declaration of Gatineau, with support for independence running very low and support for a referendum running even lower in opinion polls; this did not prove to be a popular position. An argument of Landry for this timetable was that he wanted Quebec to be present at the Summit of the Americas in Buenos Aires in 2005. Representation for Quebec had been denied by Ottawa at the previous summit held in Quebec City, an act that angered many Quebecers. At the same time, Landry kept the door opened to federalist support for the PQ and stated that he would only hold a referendum if he had the "moral assurance" of winning it. This lead Charest to accuse him of having a "hidden agenda", during the Leaders' Debate.

=== Parizeau Affair ===
On the day of the leaders' debate, Charest's advisors gave him an article from the website of the Trois-Rivières newspaper Le Nouvelliste that spoke of past PQ leader Jacques Parizeau restating his controversial remarks about "money and the ethnic vote" which he had made in his 1995 referendum concession speech. The truth of the article was later disputed, yet despite the uncertainty surrounding this article, Charest surprised Landry with it during the leaders' debate on live television by presenting the article and questioning whether the PQ leader shared his predecessor's views. This resulted in a controversy that continued to receive attention in the days and weeks following the debate.

This created a new controversy that ran for some days following the debate, and was said to have hurt Landry's campaign. The PQ denounced Charest for launching an "immoral attack" on Parizeau's reputation and dignity, saying that the article was incorrect in concluding that he had repeated his comments, but this method of response was not enough to defuse the controversy. The aftermath of the leaders' debate is thoroughly treated in the À Hauteur d'homme documentary, and became known as the Parizeau Affair.

On April 2, 2003, in an effort to distance his scandal from the party, Parizeau announced that he would no longer be campaigning for the Parti Québécois. The Parizeau Affair is thoroughly covered in the documentary À Hauteur d'homme.

=== Day care ===
The "five dollar-a-day child care" program implemented by the PQ government of Lucien Bouchard was one of the most appreciated achievements of the recent PQ administration. Some parents still did not have access to it, however, because of a lack of sufficient places. Landry, who had been Minister of Finance when the plan was implemented, vowed to continue creating more spaces. Charest presented his team as the most capable for this task. He also vowed to keep the price at $5 a day. He broke this promise later that year. See Opposition to the Charest government.

=== Public debt ===
The Action Démocratique insisted that the Government of Quebec should pay down the public debt. The other major leaders did not see it as a priority.

== Campaign slogans ==
- Action démocratique du Québec: L'avenir autrement (The future differently)
- Quebec Liberal Party: Nous sommes prêts (We are ready)
- Parti Québécois: Restons forts (Let us stay strong)

== Polling ==
Polling during the election campaign

Polling from 1998-2003

== Incumbent MNAs not running for re-election ==
=== Péquistes ===
- Diane Barbeau, Vanier
- Jacques Baril, Arthabaska
- Yves Beaumier, Champlain
- Manon Blanchet, Crémazie
- Raymond Brouillet, Chauveau
- Denise Carrier-Perreault, Chutes-de-la-Chaudière
- Michel Côté, La Peltrie
- Normand Duguay, Duplessis
- Joseph Facal, Fabre
- Gilles Labbé, Masson
- Benoît Laprise, Roberval
- Lyse Leduc, Mille-Îles
- David Payne, Vachon
- André Pelletier, Abitibi-Est
- Jean Rochon, Charlesbourg

=== Liberals ===
- Madeleine Bélanger, Mégantic-Compton
- Robert Benoit, Orford
- André Bourbeau, Laporte
- Réal Gauvin, Montmagny-L'Islet
- Pierre-Étienne Laporte, Outremont
- Anna Mancuso, Viger
- Robert Middlemiss, Pontiac
- André Tranchemontagne, Mont-Royal

=== Independents ===
- Paul Bégin, Louis-Hébert
- Jean-Claude Gobé, LaFontaine

== Redistribution of ridings ==
The Commission de la représentation électorale performed a redistribution in 2001, which maintained the number of seats in the National Assembly at 125 for the next general election, making the following alterations:

Abolished ridings	New ridings
Renaming of districts
Limoilou	Jean-Lesage
Saguenay	Réne-Lévesque
Drawn from other districts
	Mirabel (Note: Parts from Argenteuil and Deux-Montagnes.)
Merger of districts
Bourassa; Sauvé	Bourassa-Sauvé
Jeanne-Mance; Viger	Jeanne-Mance–Viger
Reorganization of districts
Salaberry-Soulanges; Beauharnois-Huntingdon	Beauharnois; Huntingdon; Soulanges

== Candidates ==
=== Bas-Saint-Laurent and Gaspésie–Îles-de-la-Madeleine ===
Electoral district	Candidates				Incumbent
Electoral district	Liberal	PQ	ADQ	Other	Incumbent
Bonaventure	Nathalie Normandeau 11,975	Marc Tétreault 6,313	Maurice Anglehart 1,101	Michel Goudreau (Green) 542	Nathalie Normandeau
Gaspé	Johnny Gérard 8,052	Guy Lelièvre 9,033	Denis Paradis 1,743	Luc-Reno Fournier (Green) 227	Guy Lelièvre
Îles-de-la-Madeleine	Simone LeBlanc 3,150	Maxime Arseneau 4,606	Évé Longuépée 92		Maxime Arseneau
Kamouraska-Témiscouata	Claude Béchard 11,266	Harold LeBel 6,326	Pierre Lévesque 6,504	Guy Duguay (Green) 293; Robert Raymond (Ind.) 238	Claude Béchard
Matane	Nancy Charest 7,602	Pascal Bérubé 7,569	Raynald Bernier 3,005	Nelson Gauthier (Ind.) 178; Nestor Turcotte (Ind.) 135; David Lejeune (Green) 124	Vacant
Matapédia	Gaston Pelletier 6,339	Danielle Doyer 9,197	Claude Fortin 4,686		Danielle Doyer
Rimouski	Éric Forest 10,817	Solange Charest 14,177	Stéphane Laforest 4,719		Solange Charest
Rivière-du-Loup	Jacques Morin 5,585	Carol Gilbert 4,155	Mario Dumont 13,452	Julie Morin (Green) 312	Mario Dumont

=== Saguenay-Lac-St-Jean, Côte-Nord and Nord-du-Québec ===
Electoral district	Candidates				Incumbent
Electoral district	Liberal	PQ	ADQ	Other	Incumbent
Chicoutimi	Jean-Guy Maltais 11,814	Stéphane Bédard 14,471	Carl Savard 5,841	Pierre Dostie (UFP) 670; Dominic Tremblay (BP) 314	Stéphane Bédard
Dubuc	Johnny Simard 9,723	Jacques Côté 9,767	Claude Gauthier 5,162	Marie Francine Bienvenue (UFP) 457	Jacques Côté
Duplessis	Marc Proulx 8,018	Lorraine Richard 10,926	Steeve Trudel 2,530	André Forbes (Ind.) 1,334	Normand Duguay
Jonquière	Françoise Gauthier 13,826	Myrtha Laflamme 11,386	Réjean Laforest 5,216	Batiste Foisy (BP) 368; Michel Perron (UFP) 330	Françoise Gauthier
Lac-Saint-Jean	Benoît Harvey 7,405	Stéphan Tremblay 15,200	Roger Filion 5,694		Stéphan Tremblay
Réne-Lévesque	François Désy 5,215	Marjolain Dufour 8,997	François Corriveau 7,356	Jean-Pierre Brison (Ind.) 449	François Corriveau; Saguenay
Roberval	Karl Blackburn 11,930	Réjean Lalancette 11,686	Bernard Généreaux 6,388	Francis Breton (UFP) 453	Benoît Laprise
Ungava	Don Bubar 4,258	Michel Létourneau 5,744	Gloria Trudeau 1,460		Michel Létourneau

=== Capitale-Nationale ===
Electoral district	Candidates				Incumbent
Electoral district	Liberal	PQ	ADQ	Other	Incumbent
Charlesbourg	Éric Mercier 17,169	Sylvie Tremblay 9,741	Jonatan Julien 10,936	Yonnel Bonaventure (Green) 438; Simon Carreau (UFP) 329	Jean Rochon
Charlevoix	Denis Lavoie 8,758	Rosaire Bertrand 10,131	Daniel Bouchard 3,998	Éric Tremblay (UFP) 168; Gabriel Tremblay (Ind.) 105; Phillippe Thivierge (DCQ) 62	Rosaire Bertrand
Chauveau	Sarah Perreault 14,774	Nathalie Samson 8,506	Hélène Napert 12,555	Christian Légaré (Ind.) 624; Marie-Noëlle Béland (UFP) 387	Raymond Brouillet
Jean-Lesage	Michel Després 15,547	Robert Caron 9,408	Aurel Bélanger 8,912	Jean-Yves Desgagnés (Ind.) 714; Nicolas Frichot (BP) 390; Jean Bédard (M-L) 185	Michel Després; Limoilou
Jean-Talon	Margaret Delisle 15,475	Daniel-Mercier Gouin 11,999	Simon Lauzon 5,149	Sacha Calixte (UFP) 515; Antonine Yaccarini (Green) 477; Sabrina Falardeau (BP) 197; Robert Bonenfant (Ind.) 126	Margaret Delisle
La Peltrie	France Hamel 16,462	Claude Gendreau 8,711	Éric Caire 13,421	Dany Hamel (Ind.) 586; Guillaume Boivin (UFP) 515	Michel Côté
Louis-Hébert	Sam Hamad 17,938	Line-Sylvie Perron 11,688	Guy Laforest 9,505	Jean-Pierre Guay (Green) 493; Jean-Phillipe Lessard-Beaupré (UFP) 402; Pierre Laliberté (BP) 281	Paul Bégin
Montmorency	Raymond Bernier 13,708	Jean-François Simard 11,226	Jean-François Paquet 11,821	Magali Paquin (UFP) 517	Jean-François Simard
Portneuf	Jean-Pierre Soucy 12,729	Roger Bertrand 8,352	Deny Lépine 10,781	François Paradis-Caron (UFP) 413	Roger Bertrand
Taschereau	Michel Beaudoin 11,240	Agnès Maltais 12,930	Jean-Guy Lemieux 6,537	Alain Marcoux (UFP) 1,136; Dominic Lapointe (Green) 731; Benjamin Kasapoglu (BP) 389; Patrice Fortin (Ind.) 102; Alain Cyr (Ind.) 95	Agnès Maltais
Vanier	Marc Bellemare 16,182	Nicole Madore 9,385	Normand Morin 11,646	Sébastien Bouchard (UFP) 573	Diane Barbeau

=== Mauricie ===
Electoral district	Candidates				Incumbent
Electoral district	Liberal	PQ	ADQ	Other	Incumbent
Champlain (May 20, 2003)	Pierre Brouillette 9,431	Noëlla Champagne 10,073	Rock Laviolette 6,459	Lucie Favreau (UFP) 103; Gilles Noel (DCQ) 73	Yves Beaumier
Laviolette	Julie Boulet 12,806	Patrick Lahaie 7,730	Sébastien Proulx 3,453	Yves Demers (UFP) 182 Josée Lafontaine (DCQ) 144	Julie Boulet
Maskinongé	Francine Gaudet 13,240	Rémy Désilets 12,334	Louise-Andrée Garant 9,118		Rémy Désilets
Saint-Maurice	Bob Vallières 8,232	Claude Pinard 8,860	Luc Arvisais 8,201	Kevin Trudel (UFP) 225	Claude Pinard
Trois-Rivières	André Gabias 11,034	Guy Julien 10,154	Jean-Claude Ayotte 5,181	Rachel Sauvageau (BP) 274; David Lanneville (UFP) 214; Marcel Fugère (Ind.) 110; Stéphane Robert (DCQ) 76	Guy Julien

=== Chaudière-Appalaches and Centre-du-Québec ===
Electoral district	Candidates				Incumbent
Electoral district	Liberal	PQ	ADQ	Other	Incumbent
Arthabaska	Claude Bachand 12,663	Danièle Caron 9,657	Alain Rayes 11,389	François Houle (Green) 379; Katrine Cyr (BP) 353	Jacques Baril
Beauce-Nord	Normand Poulin 11,104	Aline Carrier 4,160	Janvier Grondin 13,275	Julie Roy (BP) 223; Richard Fecteau (UFP) 175	Normand Poulin
Beauce-Sud	Diane Leblanc 14,170	Stéphane Pouliot 5,115	Claude Lemieux 12,852	Ginette Lewis (UFP) 216	Diane Leblanc
Bellechasse	Dominique Vien 9,658	Claude Lachance 7,084	Serge Carbonneau 8,507	Sylvain Castonguay (Green) 314 Mario Ouellette (UFP) 134	Claude Lachance
Chutes-de-la-Chaudière	Pauline Houde-Landry 12,601	Antoine Dubé 10,007	Marc Picard 14,759	Jean Bernatchez (UFP) 649	Denise Carrier-Perreault
Drummond	Jean Courchesne 13,479	Normand Jutras 15,200	Patrick Leblanc 7,577	Pascal Allard (Ind.) 393; Gilles Martineau (UFP) 301; Robert Dufour (DCQ) 199	Normand Jutras
Frontenac	Laurent Lessard 11,251	Marc Boulianne 7,281	Daniel Lamouth 6,888	Bruno Vézina (Green) 231; Marie-Josée Vachon (UFP) 145	Marc Bouliane
Johnson	Nicole Brouillette 10,700	Claude Boucher 12,232	Isabelle Marquis 6,612	Martin Marois (UFP) 343; Michel Bélanger (DCQ) 224	Claude Boucher
Lévis	Carole Théberge 12,891	Linda Goupil 12,485	Joël Bernier 10,670	Madeleine Provencher (UFP) 442 Richard Larivée (Ind.) 220	Linda Goupil
Lotbinière	Monique Drolet-Glazier 8,773	Jean-Guy Paré 6,502	Sylvie Roy 9,522	Marc Allard (Green) 306; Étienne Hallé (UFP) 175; Paul Biron (DCQ) 150	Jean-Guy Paré
Montmagny-L'Islet	Norbert Morin 9,518	Louise Soucy 4,683	Mario Dolan 8,513	Fernand Dorval (UFP) 225	Réal Gauvin
Nicolet-Yamaska	Jean Rousseau 8,927	Michel Morin 10,783	Lise Blanchette 5,899	Blak D. Blackburn (BP) 417 Simonne Lizotte (Ind.) 141	Michel Morin

=== Estrie (Eastern Townships) ===
Electoral district	Candidates				Incumbent
Electoral district	Liberal	PQ	ADQ	Other	Incumbent
Mégantic-Compton	Daniel Bouchard 11,135	Suzanne Durivage 7,347	Alain Boisvert 4,901	Christian Poulin (UFP) 193; Frank Moller (Equ.) 71	Madeleine Bélanger
Orford	Pierre Reid 17,314	Yvon Bélair 11,037	Steve Bourassa 6,145	Véronique Grenier (UFP) 498	Robert Benoît
Richmond	Yvon Vallières 14,767	André Blais 6,149	Pierre Hébert 4,899		Yvon Vallières
Saint-François	Monique Gagnon-Tremblay 16,562	Guillaume Breault-Duncan 9,926	Michel-André Samson 4,541	Suzanne Thériault (UFP) 314; François Boudreau (BP) 310	Monique Gagnon-Tremblay
Sherbrooke	Jean Charest 16,403	Marie Malavoy 13,806	Peter Downey 4,169	Normand Gilbert (UFP) 496; Serge Lachapelle (M-L) 64	Jean Charest

=== Montérégie ===
Electoral district	Candidates				Incumbent
Electoral district	Liberal	PQ	ADQ	Other	Incumbent
Beauharnois	Mario Faubert 13,265	Serge Deslières 13,904	Michael Betts 3,338	Rémi Pelletier (Green) 506	Serge Deslières; Salaberry-Soulanges
Borduas	Daniel Doucet 9,981	Jean-Pierre Charbonneau 13,840	Patricia St-Jacques 5,282	Raynald St-Onge (BP) 459	Jean-Pierre Charbonneau
Brome-Missisquoi	Pierre Paradis 18,546	Lina Le Blanc 8,093	Pierre Plante 6,018	Simon Gnocchini (UFP) 509; Lionel Albert (Equ.) 167	Pierre Paradis
Chambly	Diane Legault 17,656	Louise Beaudoin 16,857	Denis Lavoie 6,935	Sébastien Duclos (BP) 744	Louise Beaudoin
Châteauguay	Jean-Marc Fournier 20,434	Éric Cardinal 13,751	Daniel Lapointe 4,399	Gilles Lalumière (BP) 547; Guylaine Sirard (UFP) 222; Robert Jason Morgan (Equ.) 93	Jean-Marc Fournier
Huntingdon	André Chenail 15,512	François Boileau 8,302	Michel Lavoie 5,261	Kenneth Rimmer (BP) 452	André Chenail; Beauharnois-Huntingdon
Iberville	Jean Rioux 12,106	Jean-Paul Bergeron 11,185	Lucille Méthé 6,731	Michel Thiffeault (BP) 376; Benoit Lapointe (Green) 298; Guillaume Tremblay (UFP) 229	Jean-Paul Bergeron
La Pinière	Fatima Houda-Pepin 22,474	Marcel Lussier 7,934	Gérard Lachance 4,026	Inti Ortega (BP) 487	Fatima Houda-Pepin
Laporte	Michel Audet 18,673	Clément Arcand 10,178	Judy Fay 3,885	Christian Montmarquette (UFP) 489; Patrick Fiset (BP) 487; Mary Bevan-Ouellette (Equ.) 106	André Bourbeau
La Prairie	Jean Dubuc 15,805	Serge Geoffrion 14,868	Yves-André Ferland 6,478	Marc Bissonnette (BP) 547; Danielle Maire (UFP) 229; Sylvain Lesage (DCQ) 84	Serge Geoffrion
Marguerite-D'Youville	Pierre Moreau 16,368	François Beaulne 15,501	Luc Pommainville 6,596	Yan Lacombe (BP) 550; Maxime Babeu (UFP) 536	François Beaulne
Marie-Victorin	Jean-Marc Pelletier 9,799	Cécile Vermette 12,736	Michel Lalonde 4,374	Pierre Losier-Côté (BP) 462; Marc Lambert (UFP) 452; Daniel Tavéra (Ind.) 134	Cécile Vermette
Richelieu	Benoît Lefebvre 10,927	Sylvain Simard 13,286	Micheline Ulrich 3,756	Marie-Hélène Charbonneau (BP) 407; Nidal Joad (Ind.) 109; Steve Ritter (Ind.) 100; Florette Villemure-Larochelle (DCQ) 74	Sylvain Simard
Saint-Jean	Jean-Pierre Paquin 14,758	Roger Paquin 13,423	Marc-André Legault 6,856	Alexandre Boulerice (UFP) 535; Eric Bédard (BP) 462; Jean Robert (Ind.) 112; Raymond Martin (Ind.) 73	Roger Paquin
Saint-Hyacinthe	Pierre Solis 13,137	Léandre Dion 13,870	Bernard Barré 7,855	François Choquette (UFP) 401	Léandre Dion
Shefford	Bernard Brodeur 16,391	Jean-François de la Chevrotière 10,073	Sylvain Barré 8,114	Dominic Thibeault (BP) 502; Gilles Dumoulin (UFP) 334	Bernard Brodeur
Soulanges	Lucie Charlebois 13,473	Gaëtane Legault 8,753	Pierre Éloi Talbot 3,549	Gloria Sawyer (BP) 327; Sandra Stephenson (Green) 320	new district
Taillon	Annie Evrard 13,120	Pauline Marois 17,603	Katrine Simard 6,353	David Fiset (BP) 556; Gabriel Landry (UFP) 545; Xavier Rochon (Ind.) 216	Pauline Marois
Vachon	Brigitte Mercier 12,741	Camil Bouchard 12,960	Joëlle Lescop 5,540	Denis Durand (BP) 519; Richard St-Onge (UFP) 279	David Payne
Vaudreuil	Yvon Marcoux 18,490	Carole Cardinal 9,474	Luc Tison 3,487	Kathleen Mary Mangin (BP) 488; Ernest Semple (Equ.) 120	Yvon Marcoux
Verchères	Mario Lebrun 8,720	Bernard Landry 16,963	François Pratte 4,585	Sébastien Drouin (BP) 505; Marc-André Morvan (UFP) 195	Bernard Landry

=== Montreal ===
==== East ====
Electoral district	Candidates				Incumbent
Electoral district	Liberal	PQ	ADQ	Other	Incumbent
Anjou	Lise Thériault 17,572	France Bachand 10,573	Martin Janson 4,319	Hélène Héroux (M-L) 266	Lise Thériault
Bourassa-Sauvé	Line Beauchamp 20,175	Kettly Beauregard 8,243	Michelle Allaire 3,771	Francis Mallette (Green) 327; Sylvain Archambault (Ind.) 261; Denis Gagné (DCQ) 119; Claude Brunelle (M-L) 94; Boris Mospan (Equ.) 44	Michèle Lamquin-Éthier; Bourassa
Bourassa-Sauvé	Line Beauchamp 20,175	Kettly Beauregard 8,243	Michelle Allaire 3,771	Francis Mallette (Green) 327; Sylvain Archambault (Ind.) 261; Denis Gagné (DCQ) 119; Claude Brunelle (M-L) 94; Boris Mospan (Equ.) 44	merged district
Bourassa-Sauvé	Line Beauchamp 20,175	Kettly Beauregard 8,243	Michelle Allaire 3,771	Francis Mallette (Green) 327; Sylvain Archambault (Ind.) 261; Denis Gagné (DCQ) 119; Claude Brunelle (M-L) 94; Boris Mospan (Equ.) 44	Line Beauchamp; Sauvé
Bourget	Claude Paquette 11,290	Diane Lemieux 15,074	Pierre Bourque 5,747	Steve Boudrias (BP) 469; Rosanne Labelle (UFP) 418; Claudette Deschamps (DCQ) 193	Diane Lemieux
Crémazie	Michèle Lamquin-Éthier 15,498	Hugues Cormier 13,979	Manon St-Louis 4,057	Jocelyne Desautels (UFP) 686; Claude Trudel (Green) 399; Phillippe Beauvais (BP) 306; Marsha Fine (M-L) 90	Manon Blanchet
Gouin	William Aguilar 8,996	André Boisclair 15,890	Stéphane Deschênes 2,456	Colette Provost (UFP) 1,397; Pierrette Chevalier (Green) 584; Hugô St-Onge (BP) 465	André Boisclair
Hochelaga-Maisonneuve	Richer Dompierre 6,210	Louise Harel 13,138	Louise Blackburn 2,449	Lise Alarie (UFP) 788; Alex Néron (BP) 476; Daniel Breton (Green) 367; Christine Dandenault (M-L) 79; Mario Richard (DCQ) 52	Louise Harel
Jeanne-Mance–Viger	Michel Bissonnet 26,801	Robert La Rose 4,303	Carole Giroux 2,080	Eddy Guarino (BP) 365	Michel Bissonnet; Jeanne-Mance
Jeanne-Mance–Viger	Michel Bissonnet 26,801	Robert La Rose 4,303	Carole Giroux 2,080	Eddy Guarino (BP) 365	merged district
Jeanne-Mance–Viger	Michel Bissonnet 26,801	Robert La Rose 4,303	Carole Giroux 2,080	Eddy Guarino (BP) 365	Anna Mancuso; Viger
LaFontaine	Tony Tomassi 18,164	Line Pelletier 4,939	Josée Anello 2,697	Patrick Forcier (BP) 323	Jean-Claude Gobé
Laurier-Dorion	Christos Sirros 16,052	Tomas Arbieto 9,775	Mario Spina 1,996	William Sloan (UFP) 922; Phillippe Morlighem (Green) 595; Sylvain Mainville (BP) 375; Peter Macrisopoulos (M-L) 165; Charles Robidoux (Ind.) 131; Sylvie Charbin (Ind.) 117; Yang Zhang (Equ.) 78	Christos Sirros
Mercier	Nathalie Rochefort 8,414	Daniel Turp 13,334	Vivian Goulder 1,855	Amir Khadir (UFP) 5,278; Lyne Rivard (BP) 579	Nathalie Rochefort
Pointe-aux-Trembles	Daniel Fournier 9,427	Nicole Léger 14,261	André Cordeau 4,050	Xavier Daxhelet (Green) 457; Julien Ferron (DCQ) 137; Geneviève Royer (M-L) 80	Nicole Léger
Rosemont	Marylin Thomas 14,721	Rita Dionne-Marsolais 16,143	Denise Larouche 4,248	Omar Aktouf (UFP) 1,132; Huguette Plourde (BP) 493; Suzelle Gill (DCQ) 147	Rita Dionne-Marsolais
Sainte-Marie–Saint-Jacques	Richard Brosseau 7,989	André Boulerice 13,066	Annick Brousseau 2,183	Gaétan Breton (UFP) 1,699; Robert Ruffo (Green) 690; Antoine Théorêt-Poupart (BP) 444; Ginette Boutet (M-L) 87; Maria da Luz dos Santos Inacio (DCQ) 59	André Boulerice
Viau	William Cusano 17,703	Maka Kotto 6,142	Paolo Tamburello 2,406	Guillaume Blouin-Beaudoin (BP) 426; Jocelyne Dupuis (UFP) 324; Yannick Duguay (Ind.) 121	William Cusano

==== West ====
Electoral district	Candidates				Incumbent
Electoral district	Liberal	PQ	ADQ	Other	Incumbent
Acadie	Yvan Bordeleau 23,211	Maria Mourani 6,702	Jean-Pierre Chamoun 2,253	Johnathan Bérubé (BP) 440; André Parizeau (Ind.) 161; Linda Sullivan (M-L) 111; Marina Paümann (Equ.) 95	Yvan Bordeleau
D'Arcy-McGee	Lawrence Bergman 23,968	Mathieu Breault 1,087	Sylvain James Bowes 520	William Shaw (Equ.) 406; Blair Longley (BP) 274	Lawrence Bergman
Jacques-Cartier	Geoffrey Kelley 30,035	Guy Amyot 1,894	Jeffrey Penney 1,253	Ryan Young (Green) 727; Keith Henderson (Equ.) 650; Daniel Cormier-Roach (Ind.) 49	Geoffrey Kelley
Marguerite-Bourgeoys	Monique Jérôme-Forget 22,807	Suzanne Groulx 6,327	Brigitte De Laroche 2,524	Adam Jastrzebski (Green) 415; Paul Domagala (Equ.) 142; Marc Veilleux (DCQ) 94; Yves le Seigle (M-L) 68	Monique Jérôme-Forget
Marquette	François Ouimet 21,232	Yves Beauregard 7,672	Denise Décoste 3,260	Bruce Hulley (Equ.) 289; Garnet Colly (M-L) 179	François Ouimet
Mont-Royal	Philippe Couillard 21,021	Vincent Gagnon 3,465	Nour-Eddine Hajibi 1,240	Frank Kiss (Equ.) 256	André Tranchemontagne
Nelligan	Russell Williams 27,934	Micaël Poirier 4,611	Sabrina Duguay 2,680	Peter Graham (Green) 541; Giuliana Pendenza (Equ.) 233	Russell Williams
Notre-Dame-de-Grâce	Russell Copeman 18,911	Laurent Malépart 3,460	Allan Patrick 1,225	Jessica Gal (Green) 1,084; Helene Jutras (BP) 261; Peter Sauvé (Equ.) 246; Thomas Kernan (DCQ) 96; Rachel Hoffman (M-L) 71	Russell Copeman
Outremont	Yves Séguin 14,278	Marilyse Lapierre 8,218	Christian de Serres 1,712	Jill Hanley (UFP) 1,818; Maryève Daigle (BP) 345; Louise Charron (M-L) 119	Pierre-Étienne Laporte
Robert-Baldwin	Pierre Marsan 28,892	Alphonse Boisrond 2,637	Alladin Abou Sharbin 1,705	Jimmy Kalafatidis (Equ.) 411	Pierre Marsan
Saint-Henri–Sainte-Anne	Nicole Loiselle 16,004	Raymond Munger 9,830	Claudette Marullo 2,645	Marc-André Payette (UFP) 595; Suzanne Moussette (Green) 439; Nicky Tanguay (BP) 424; Andrzej Jastrzebski (DCQ) 142; Jean-Paul Bédard (M-L) 116; Larry Vitas (Equ.) 52	Nicole Loiselle
Saint-Laurent	Jacques Dupuis 24,745	William Fayad 4,556	Sophie Theoharopoulos 1,834	Alain Pérusse (UFP) 325; Fernand Deschamps (M-L) 206; Louis Ottoni (Equ.) 199	Jacques Dupuis
Verdun	Henri-François Gautrin 15,185	Denis Martel 8,782	Sébastien Guérin 3,269	Claude Genest (Green) 658; Pascal Durand (UFP) 368; Vincent Aubry (BP) 357; Gilles Noël (DCQ) 104; Normand Chouinard (M-L) 71; Bernard King (Equ.) 63; Robert Lindblad (Ind.) 54	Henri-François Gautrin
Westmount–Saint-Louis	Jacques Chagnon 18,330	Denise Laroche 2,372	Nathalie Beaupré 959	David Fennario (UFP) 718; David John Proctor (BP) 223; Don Donderi (Equ.) 182; Diane Johnston (M-L) 64	Jacques Chagnon

=== Laval ===
Electoral district	Candidates				Incumbent
Electoral district	Liberal	PQ	ADQ	Other	Incumbent
Chomedey	Thomas Mulcair 25,363	Coline Chhay 6,568	Vicken Darakdijian 3,384	Polyvios Tsakanikas (M-L) 210; Robert Tamilia (Equ.) 148	Thomas Mulcair
Fabre	Michelle Courchesne 18,689	Nathalie Saint-Pierre 14,428	Claude Dugas 6,370	Pierre Bibeau (Ind.) 402	Joseph Facal
Laval-des-Rapides	Alain Paquet 15,190	Serge Ménard 13,209	Philippe Laurin 4,693	Louis-Philippe Verenka (Green) 366; Vincent Pelletier (BP) 339; Michelle Marleau (DCQ) 162	Serge Ménard
Mille-Îles	Maurice Clermont 19,924	Maude Delangis 14,333	Gerry La Rocca 5,093	Christian Lajoie (Ind.) 244; Régent Millette (DCQ) 113	Lyse Leduc
Vimont	Vincent Auclair 17,908	Normand Dupont 12,865	François Gaudreau 7,227	Serge Légaré (Green) 403; André Pigeon (UFP) 269	François Gaudreau

=== Laurentides ===
Electoral district	Candidates				Incumbent
Electoral district	Liberal	PQ	ADQ	Other	Incumbent
Argenteuil	David Whissell 12,645	Georges Lapointe 5,906	Sylvain Demers 4,372	Claude Sabourin (Green) 496; Yannick Charpentier (BP) 292	David Whissell
Bertrand	Michelle Montpetit 13,502	Claude Cousineau 14,704	Danielle Tremblay 4,834	Richard Savignac (Green) 664; Serge Haroun (DCQ) 490; David Rovins (Ind.) 41	Claude Cousineau
Blainville	Jocelyne Roch 12,689	Richard Legendre 15,288	Diane Bellemare 7,407	Thérèse Hamel (UFP) 394	Richard Legendre
Deux-Montagnes	Marc Lauzon 12,099	Hélène Robert 12,432	Éric Duhaime 6,907	Julien Demers (UFP) 408	Hélène Robert
Groulx	Pierre Descoteaux 13,763	Robert Kieffer 13,460	Sophie Cardinal 6,746	Denis Letourneux (UFP) 436; Julien Boisvert (BP) 402	Robert Kieffer
Labelle	Jean-Pierre Miljours 10,501	Sylvain Pagé 13,530	Pascal De Bellefeuille 4,283	Anne Léger (Green) 468; André Haché (BP) 274	Sylvain Pagé
Mirabel	Réal Proulx 7,529	Denise Beaudoin 10,577	Hubert Meilleur 9,486		new district
Prévost	Marie-Josée Gouin 11,855	Lucie Papineau 16,159	Martin Camirand 7,087	Alexandre Émond (BP) 499; Reine Dubeau (DCQ) 179	Lucie Papineau

=== Lanaudière ===
Electoral district	Candidates				Incumbent
Electoral district	Liberal	PQ	ADQ	Other	Incumbent
Berthier	Carole Majeau 10,828	Alexandre Bourdeau 12,101	Marie Grégoire 11,014	Pierre Gravel (UFP) 632	Marie Grégoire
Joliette	Robert Groulx 11,161	Jonathan Valois 13,103	Sylvie Lespérance 7,114	Mathieu Lessard (UFP) 1,149 Marco Geoffroy (BP) 667	Sylvie Lespérance
L'Assomption	Sylvie Thouin 14,111	Jean-Claude St-André 16,965	Daniel Labrecque 7,053	Bob Aubin (Green) 602 Gilbert Morin (UFP) 356	Jean-Claude St-André
Masson	Richard Marcotte 11,371	Luc Thériault 15,445	Nathalie Filion 7,637		Gilles Labbé
Rousseau	Michel F. Brunet 9,127	François Legault 14,079	François Girouard 5,645	Alex Boisdequin-Lefort (UFP) 324; Gérard Gauthier (DCQ) 249	François Legault
Terrebonne	Marcel Théorêt 11,353	Jocelyne Caron 17,327	Jean-Pierre Parrot 6,463	Marco Legrand (UFP) 440	Jocelyne Caron

=== Outaouais and Abitibi-Témiscamingue ===
Electoral district	Candidates				Incumbent
Electoral district	Liberal	PQ	ADQ	Other	Incumbent
Abitibi-Est	Pierre Corbeil 9,056	Lorraine Morissette 7,110	Serge Allard 4,477	Guy Cloutier (BP) 286; Samuel Dupras-Doroftei (Ind.) 202	André Pelletier
Abitibi-Ouest	Jean-Louis Carignan 7,960	François Gendron 9,677	Claude Morin 3,661		François Gendron
Rouyn-Noranda–Témiscamingue	Daniel Bernard 10,347	Rémy Trudel 9,673	Pierre Brien 7,849	Patrick Rancourt (UFP) 507	Rémy Trudel
Chapleau	Benoît Pelletier 18,774	Sylvie Simard 6,512	Berthe Miron 3,949	Daniel Leblanc-Poirier (BP) 402; Jean Marois (UFP) 331; Gabriel Girard-Bernier (M-L) 122	Benoît Pelletier
Gatineau	Réjean Lafrenière 16,481	Dominique Bedwell 6,663	Brian Gibb 3,494	Julie Mercier (UFP) 423; Françoise Roy (M-L) 95	Réjean Lafrenière
Hull	Roch Cholette 16,262	Raphaël Déry 7,234	Jean-François LaRue 3,663	Denise Veilleux (UFP) 677; Stéphane Salko (BP) 305; Maxime Gauld (Ind.) 155; Benoit Legros (M-L) 72; Gheorghe Irimia (Ind.) 37	Roch Cholette
Papineau	Norman MacMillan 17,933	Gilles Hébert 8,279	Serge Charette 3,833	Nathalie Gratton (Green) 576; Dominique Marceau (UFP) 286	Norman MacMillan
Pontiac	Charlotte L'Écuyer 17,885	Luc Côté 3,133	Victor Bilodeau 1,830	Serge Tanguay (UFP) 392; Louis Lang (M-L) 132	Robert Middlemiss

== Results ==
Summary of the April 14, 2003 National Assembly of Quebec election results
Party	Leader	Candidates	Votes				Seats		
Party	Leader	Candidates	#	±	%	Change (pp)	1998	2003	±
Liberal	Jean Charest	125	1,755,863	15,995▼	45.99	2.44	48	76 / 125	28▲
Parti Québécois	Bernard Landry	125	1,269,183	475,057▼	33.24%	-9.63	76	45 / 125	31▼
Action démocratique	Mario Dumont	125	694,122	213,486▲	18.18	6.37	1	4 / 125	3▲
UFP (Note: Compared to 1998 PDS total.)	(leading council)	74	40,422	16,325▲	1.06	0.47			
Bloc Pot	Hugô St-Onge	56	22,904	12,960▲	0.60	0.36			
Green	Richard Savignac	37	16,975	16,975▲	0.44	New			
Independent		35	8,269	4,172▼	0.22	-0.09			
Equality	Keith Henderson	21	4,051	8,492▼	0.11	-0.20			
Christian Democracy	Gilles Noël	25	3,226	3,226▲	0.08	New			
Marxist–Leninist	Claude Brunelle	23	2,749	2▲	0.07	–			
Total		646	3,817,764		100.00%				
Rejected ballots			48,484	1,493▲					
Turnout			3,866,248	248,915▼	70.42%	7.90▼			
Registered voters			5,490,551	236,069▲					

=== Vote and seat summaries ===
Ternary plots - shift of electoral support (1998-2003)
1998

2003
Electoral districts identified by colours of winning parties

=== Synopsis of results ===
Results by riding - 2003 Quebec general election
Riding	Winning party								Turnout (Note: including spoilt ballots)	Votes (Note: All parties with more than 1% of the vote, or which had a candidate that polled at least 1,000 votes, are shown individually. Independent candidates and other minor parties are aggregated separately.)							
Name	1998	1st place	Votes	Share	Margin #	Margin %	2nd place	3rd place	Turnout	Lib	PQ	ADQ	UFP	Grn	Ind	Oth	Total
Abitibi-Est	PQ	Lib	9,056	42.86%	1,946	9.21%	PQ	ADQ	66.41%	9,056	7,110	4,477	–	–	202	286	21,131
Abitibi-Ouest	PQ	PQ	9,677	45.44%	1,717	8.06%	Lib	ADQ	66.77%	7,960	9,677	3,661	–	–	–	–	21,298
Acadie	Lib	Lib	23,211	70.39%	16,509	50.07%	PQ	ADQ	65.66%	23,211	6,702	2,253	–	–	161	646	32,973
Anjou	Lib	Lib	17,572	53.69%	6,999	21.38%	PQ	ADQ	73.30%	17,572	10,573	4,319	–	–	–	266	32,730
Argenteuil	Lib	Lib	12,645	53.33%	6,739	28.42%	PQ	ADQ	66.46%	12,645	5,906	4,372	–	496	–	292	23,711
Arthabaska	PQ	Lib	12,663	36.77%	1,274	3.70%	ADQ	PQ	73.62%	12,663	9,657	11,389	–	379	–	353	34,441
Beauce-Nord	Lib	ADQ	13,275	45.88%	2,171	7.50%	Lib	PQ	75.96%	11,104	4,160	13,275	175	–	–	223	28,937
Beauce-Sud	Lib	Lib	14,170	43.80%	1,318	4.07%	ADQ	PQ	72.45%	14,170	5,115	12,852	216	–	–	–	32,353
Beauharnois	New	PQ	13,904	44.83%	639	2.06%	Lib	ADQ	74.32%	13,265	13,904	3,338	–	506	–	–	31,013
Bellechasse	PQ	Lib	9,658	37.58%	1,151	4.48%	ADQ	PQ	76.10%	9,658	7,084	8,507	134	314	–	–	25,697
Berthier	PQ	PQ	12,101	35.00%	1,087	3.14%	ADQ	Lib	69.37%	10,828	12,101	11,014	632	–	–	–	34,575
Bertrand	PQ	PQ	14,704	43.33%	1,202	3.54%	Lib	ADQ	70.37%	13,502	14,704	4,834	–	664	41	190	33,935
Blainville	PQ	PQ	15,288	42.73%	2,599	7.26%	Lib	ADQ	74.72%	12,689	15,288	7,407	394	–	–	–	35,778
Bonaventure	Lib	Lib	11,975	60.08%	5,662	28.41%	PQ	ADQ	70.40%	11,975	6,313	1,101	–	542	–	–	19,931
Borduas	PQ	PQ	13,840	46.82%	3,859	13.05%	Lib	ADQ	77.84%	9,981	13,840	5,282	–	–	–	459	29,562
Bourassa-Sauvé	New	Lib	20,175	61.07%	11,932	36.12%	PQ	ADQ	64.22%	20,175	8,243	3,771	–	327	261	257	33,034
Bourget	PQ	PQ	15,074	45.42%	3,784	11.40%	Lib	ADQ	71.33%	11,290	15,074	5,747	418	–	–	662	33,191
Brome-Missisquoi	Lib	Lib	18,546	55.64%	10,453	31.36%	PQ	ADQ	70.44%	18,546	8,093	6,018	509	–	–	167	33,333
Chambly	PQ	Lib	17,656	41.85%	799	1.89%	PQ	ADQ	78.45%	17,656	16,857	6,935	–	–	–	744	42,192
Champlain (Note: Election resulted in a tie for first place. It was held again on May 20, 2003.)	PQ	PQ	10,073	38.35%	642	2.44%	Lib	ADQ	57.70%	9,431	10,073	6,459	103	126	–	73	26,265
Chapleau	Lib	Lib	18,774	62.39%	12,262	40.75%	PQ	ADQ	58.70%	18,774	6,512	3,949	331	–	–	524	30,090
Charlesbourg	PQ	Lib	17,169	44.46%	6,233	16.14%	ADQ	PQ	79.06%	17,169	9,741	10,936	329	438	–	–	38,613
Charlevoix	PQ	PQ	10,131	43.63%	1,373	5.91%	Lib	ADQ	71.69%	8,758	10,131	3,998	168	–	105	62	23,222
Châteauguay	Lib	Lib	20,434	51.80%	6,683	16.94%	PQ	ADQ	74.33%	20,434	13,751	4,399	222	–	–	640	39,446
Chauveau	PQ	Lib	14,774	40.10%	2,219	6.02%	ADQ	PQ	76.87%	14,774	8,506	12,555	387	–	624	–	36,846
Chicoutimi	PQ	PQ	14,471	43.71%	2,657	8.02%	Lib	ADQ	71.89%	11,814	14,471	5,841	670	–	–	314	33,110
Chomedey	Lib	Lib	25,363	71.10%	18,795	52.69%	PQ	ADQ	66.86%	25,363	6,568	3,384	–	–	–	358	35,673
Chutes-de-la-Chaudière	PQ	ADQ	14,759	38.82%	2,158	5.68%	Lib	PQ	80.39%	12,601	10,007	14,759	649	–	–	–	38,016
Crémazie	PQ	Lib	15,498	44.26%	1,519	4.34%	PQ	ADQ	73.43%	15,498	13,979	4,057	686	399	–	396	35,015
D'Arcy-McGee	Lib	Lib	23,968	91.29%	22,881	87.15%	PQ	ADQ	61.64%	23,968	1,087	520	–	–	–	680 (Note: William Shaw was previously elected as a Union Nationale MPP in 1976. He campaigned in this election for the Equality Party and received 406 votes.)	26,255
Deux-Montagnes	PQ	PQ	12,432	39.04%	333	1.05%	Lib	ADQ	74.37%	12,099	12,432	6,907	408	–	–	–	31,846
Drummond	PQ	PQ	15,200	40.92%	1,721	4.63%	Lib	ADQ	70.49%	13,479	15,200	7,577	301	–	393	199	37,149
Dubuc	PQ	PQ	9,767	38.90%	44	0.18%	Lib	ADQ	68.07%	9,723	9,767	5,162	457	–	–	–	25,109
Duplessis	PQ	PQ	10,926	47.90%	2,908	12.75%	Lib	ADQ	63.46%	8,018	10,926	2,530	–	–	1,334	–	22,808
Fabre	PQ	Lib	18,689	46.85%	4,261	10.68%	PQ	ADQ	75.49%	18,689	14,428	6,370	–	–	402	–	39,889
Frontenac	PQ	Lib	11,251	43.65%	3,970	15.40%	PQ	ADQ	77.77%	11,251	7,281	6,888	125	231	–	–	25,776
Gaspé	PQ	PQ	9,033	47.40%	981	5.15%	Lib	ADQ	68.72%	8,052	9,033	1,743	–	227	–	–	19,055
Gatineau	Lib	Lib	16,481	60.69%	9,818	36.15%	PQ	ADQ	60.58%	16,481	6,663	3,494	423	–	–	95	27,156
Gouin	PQ	PQ	15,890	53.34%	6,894	23.14%	Lib	ADQ	68.02%	8,996	15,890	2,456	1,397	584	–	465	29,788
Groulx	PQ	Lib	13,763	39.54%	303	0.87%	PQ	ADQ	73.52%	13,763	13,460	6,746	436	–	–	402	34,807
Hochelaga-Maisonneuve	PQ	PQ	13,138	55.77%	6,928	29.41%	Lib	ADQ	60.09%	6,210	13,138	2,449	788	367	–	607	23,559
Hull	Lib	Lib	16,262	57.25%	9,028	31.78%	PQ	ADQ	58.46%	16,262	7,234	3,663	677	–	192	377	28,405
Huntingdon	New	Lib	15,512	52.53%	7,210	24.42%	PQ	ADQ	72.35%	15,512	8,302	5,261	–	–	–	452	29,527
Iberville	PQ	Lib	12,106	39.15%	921	2.98%	PQ	ADQ	73.75%	12,106	11,185	6,731	229	298	–	376	30,925
Îles-de-la-Madeleine	PQ	PQ	4,606	58.69%	1,456	18.55%	Lib	ADQ	77.43%	3,150	4,606	92	–	–	–	–	7,848
Jacques-Cartier	Lib	Lib	30,035	86.79%	28,141	81.31%	PQ	ADQ	70.24%	30,035	1,894	1,253	–	727	49	650	34,608
Jean-Lesage	Lib	Lib	15,547	44.22%	6,139	17.46%	PQ	ADQ	72.24%	15,547	9,408	8,912	–	–	714	575	35,156
Jeanne-Mance–Viger	New	Lib	26,801	79.89%	22,498	67.06%	PQ	ADQ	67.70%	26,801	4,303	2,080	–	–	–	365	33,549
Jean-Talon	Lib	Lib	15,475	45.60%	3,476	10.24%	PQ	ADQ	80.45%	15,475	11,999	5,149	515	477	126	197	33,938
Johnson	PQ	PQ	12,232	40.62%	1,532	5.09%	Lib	ADQ	72.74%	10,700	12,232	6,612	343	–	–	224	30,111
Joliette	PQ	PQ	13,104	39.48%	1,943	5.85%	Lib	ADQ	71.43%	11,161	13,104	7,114	1,149	–	–	667	33,195
Jonquière	PQ	Lib	13,826	44.42%	2,440	7.84%	PQ	ADQ	70.68%	13,826	11,386	5,216	330	–	–	368	31,126
Kamouraska-Témiscouata	Lib	Lib	11,266	45.75%	4,762	19.34%	ADQ	PQ	70.90%	11,266	6,326	6,504	–	293	238	–	24,627
Labelle	PQ	PQ	13,530	46.57%	3,029	10.42%	Lib	ADQ	68.68%	10,501	13,530	4,283	–	468	–	274	29,056
Lac-Saint-Jean	PQ	PQ	15,200	53.71%	7,795	27.55%	Lib	ADQ	69.58%	7,405	15,200	5,694	–	–	–	–	28,299
LaFontaine	Lib	Lib	18,164	69.53%	13,225	50.63%	PQ	ADQ	70.82%	18,164	4,939	2,697	–	–	–	323	26,123
La Peltrie	PQ	Lib	16,462	41.47%	3,041	7.66%	ADQ	PQ	79.01%	16,462	8,711	13,421	515	–	586	–	39,695
La Pinière	Lib	Lib	22,474	64.36%	14,540	41.64%	PQ	ADQ	69.96%	22,474	7,934	4,026	–	–	–	487	34,921
Laporte	Lib	Lib	18,673	55.22%	8,495	25.12%	PQ	ADQ	71.80%	18,673	10,178	3,885	489	–	–	593	33,818
La Prairie	PQ	Lib	15,805	41.58%	937	2.47%	PQ	ADQ	75.91%	15,805	14,868	6,478	229	–	–	631	38,011
L'Assomption	PQ	PQ	16,965	43.40%	2,854	7.30%	Lib	ADQ	75.16%	14,111	16,965	7,053	356	602	–	–	39,087
Laurier-Dorion	Lib	Lib	16,052	53.14%	6,277	20.78%	PQ	ADQ	64.36%	16,052	9,775	1,996	922	595	248	621	30,209
Laval-des-Rapides	PQ	Lib	15,190	44.73%	1,981	5.83%	PQ	ADQ	69.82%	15,190	13,209	4,693	–	366	–	501	33,959
Laviolette	PQ	Lib	12,806	52.67%	5,076	20.88%	PQ	ADQ	72.18%	12,806	7,730	3,453	182	–	–	144	24,315
Lévis	PQ	Lib	12,891	35.12%	406	1.11%	PQ	ADQ	77.56%	12,891	12,485	10,670	442	–	220	–	36,708
Lotbinière	PQ	ADQ	9,522	37.45%	749	2.95%	Lib	PQ	77.57%	8,773	6,502	9,522	175	306	–	150	25,428
Louis-Hébert	PQ	Lib	17,938	44.53%	6,270	15.56%	PQ	ADQ	81.12%	17,938	11,668	9,505	402	493	–	281	40,287
Marguerite-Bourgeoys	Lib	Lib	22,807	70.44%	16,480	50.90%	PQ	ADQ	68.14%	22,807	6,327	2,524	–	415	–	304	32,377
Marguerite-D'Youville	PQ	Lib	16,368	41.38%	867	2.19%	PQ	ADQ	81.93%	16,368	15,501	6,596	536	–	–	550	39,551
Marie-Victorin	PQ	PQ	12,736	45.39%	2,937	10.47%	Lib	ADQ	67.05%	9,799	12,736	4,374	452	–	134	566	28,061
Marquette	Lib	Lib	21,232	65.06%	13,560	41.55%	PQ	ADQ	66.11%	21,232	7,672	3,260	–	–	–	468	32,632
Maskinongé	PQ	Lib	13,240	38.16%	906	2.61%	PQ	ADQ	74.62%	13,240	12,334	9,118	–	–	–	–	34,692
Masson	PQ	PQ	15,445	44.83%	4,074	11.82%	Lib	ADQ	70.86%	11,371	15,445	7,637	–	–	–	–	34,453
Matane	PQ	Lib	7,602	40.84%	33	0.18%	PQ	ADQ	67.56%	7,602	7,569	3,005	–	124	313	–	18,613
Matapédia	PQ	PQ	9,197	45.48%	2,858	14.13%	Lib	ADQ	68.97%	6,339	9,197	4,686	–	–	–	–	20,222
Mégantic-Compton	Lib	Lib	11,135	47.09%	3,788	16.02%	PQ	ADQ	72.38%	11,135	7,347	4,901	193	–	–	71	23,647
Mercier	PQ	PQ	13,334	45.26%	4,920	16.70%	Lib	UFP	69.56%	8,414	13,334	1,855	5,278	–	–	579	29,460
Mille-Îles	PQ	Lib	19,924	50.18%	5,591	14.08%	PQ	ADQ	76.14%	19,924	14,333	5,093	–	–	244	113	39,707
Mirabel	New	PQ	10,577	38.33%	1,091	3.95%	ADQ	Lib	72.02%	7,529	10,577	9,486	–	–	–	–	27,592
Montmagny-L'Islet	Lib	Lib	9,518	41.17%	1,005	4.35%	ADQ	PQ	72.34%	9,518	4,863	8,513	225	–	–	–	23,119
Montmorency	PQ	Lib	13,708	36.78%	1,887	5.06%	ADQ	PQ	77.09%	13,708	11,226	11,821	517	–	–	–	37,272
Mont-Royal	Lib	Lib	21,021	80.91%	17,556	67.57%	PQ	ADQ	59.60%	21,021	3,465	1,240	–	–	–	256	25,982
Nelligan	Lib	Lib	27,934	77.60%	23,323	64.79%	PQ	ADQ	69.65%	27,934	4,611	2,680	–	541	–	233	35,999
Nicolet-Yamaska	PQ	PQ	10,783	41.21%	1,856	7.09%	Lib	ADQ	77.82%	8,927	10,783	5,899	–	–	141	417	26,167
Notre-Dame-de-Grâce	Lib	Lib	18,911	74.59%	15,451	60.94%	PQ	ADQ	61.80%	18,911	3,460	1,225	–	1,084	–	674	25,354
Orford	Lib	Lib	17,314	49.48%	6,277	17.94%	PQ	ADQ	71.42%	17,314	11,037	6,145	498	–	–	–	34,994
Outremont	Lib	Lib	14,278	53.90%	6,060	22.88%	PQ	UFP	62.81%	14,278	8,218	1,712	1,818	–	–	464	26,490
Papineau	Lib	Lib	17,933	58.02%	9,654	31.24%	PQ	ADQ	61.03%	17,933	8,279	3,833	286	576	–	–	30,907
Pointe-aux-Trembles	PQ	PQ	14,261	50.19%	4,834	17.01%	Lib	ADQ	72.30%	9,427	14,261	4,050	–	457	–	217	28,412
Pontiac	Lib	Lib	17,885	76.52%	14,752	63.12%	PQ	ADQ	55.44%	17,885	3,133	1,830	392	–	–	132	23,372
Portneuf	PQ	Lib	12,729	39.44%	1,948	6.04%	ADQ	PQ	77.07%	12,729	8,352	10,781	413	–	–	–	32,275
Prévost	PQ	PQ	16,159	45.16%	4,304	12.03%	Lib	ADQ	69.30%	11,855	16,159	7,087	–	–	–	678	35,779
Réne-Lévesque	PQ	PQ	8,997	40.86%	1,641	7.45%	ADQ	Lib	63.07%	5,215	8,997	7,356	–	–	449	–	22,017
Richelieu	PQ	PQ	13,286	46.36%	2,359	8.23%	Lib	ADQ	72.93%	10,927	13,286	3,756	–	–	209	481	28,659
Richmond	Lib	Lib	14,767	57.20%	8,618	33.38%	PQ	ADQ	73.80%	14,767	6,149	4,899	–	–	–	–	25,815
Rimouski	PQ	PQ	14,177	47.71%	3,360	11.31%	Lib	ADQ	71.07%	10,817	14,177	4,719	–	–	–	–	29,713
Rivière-du-Loup	ADQ	ADQ	13,452	57.23%	7,867	33.47%	Lib	PQ	72.66%	5,585	4,155	13,452	–	312	–	–	23,504
Robert-Baldwin	Lib	Lib	28,892	85.87%	26,255	78.04%	PQ	ADQ	65.26%	28,892	2,637	1,705	–	–	–	411	33,645
Roberval	PQ	Lib	11,930	39.17%	244	0.80%	PQ	ADQ	68.45%	11,930	11,686	6,388	453	–	–	–	30,457
Rosemont	PQ	PQ	16,143	43.77%	1,422	3.86%	Lib	ADQ	71.32%	14,721	16,143	4,248	1,132	–	–	640	36,884
Rousseau	PQ	PQ	14,079	47.85%	4,952	16.83%	Lib	ADQ	64.97%	9,127	14,079	5,645	324	–	–	249	29,424
Rouyn-Noranda–Témiscamingue	PQ	Lib	10,347	36.46%	674	2.38%	PQ	ADQ	67.42%	10,347	9,673	7,849	507	–	–	–	28,376
Sainte-Marie–Saint-Jacques	PQ	PQ	13,066	49.84%	5,077	19.37%	Lib	ADQ	61.51%	7,989	13,066	2,183	1,699	690	–	590	26,217
Saint-François	Lib	Lib	16,562	52.32%	6,636	20.96%	PQ	ADQ	71.67%	16,562	9,926	4,541	314	–	–	310	31,653
Saint-Henri-Sainte-Anne	Lib	Lib	16,004	52.91%	6,174	20.41%	PQ	ADQ	61.04%	16,004	9,830	2,645	595	439	–	734	30,247
Saint-Hyacinthe	PQ	PQ	13,870	39.33%	733	2.08%	Lib	ADQ	74.72%	13,137	13,870	7,855	401	–	–	–	35,263
Saint-Jean	PQ	Lib	14,758	40.75%	1,335	3.69%	PQ	ADQ	72.34%	14,758	13,423	6,856	535	–	185	462	36,219
Saint-Laurent	Lib	Lib	24,745	77.66%	20,189	63.36%	PQ	ADQ	63.61%	24,745	4,556	1,834	325	–	–	405	31,865
Saint-Maurice	PQ	PQ	8,860	34.72%	628	2.46%	Lib	ADQ	72.67%	8,232	8,860	8,201	225	–	–	–	25,518
Shefford	Lib	Lib	16,391	46.28%	6,318	17.84%	PQ	ADQ	69.91%	16,391	10,073	8,114	334	–	–	502	35,414
Sherbrooke	Lib	Lib	16,403	46.95%	2,597	7.43%	PQ	ADQ	73.49%	16,403	13,806	4,169	496	–	–	64	34,938
Soulanges	New	Lib	13,473	50.99%	4,720	17.86%	PQ	ADQ	74.19%	13,473	8,753	3,549	–	320	–	327	26,422
Taillon	PQ	PQ	17,603	45.85%	4,483	11.68%	Lib	ADQ	71.02%	13,120	17,603	6,353	545	–	216	556	38,393
Taschereau	PQ	PQ	12,930	38.95%	1,690	5.09%	Lib	ADQ	69.37%	11,240	12,930	6,537	1,176	731	197	389	33,200
Terrebonne	PQ	PQ	17,327	48.69%	5,974	16.79%	Lib	ADQ	73.31%	11,353	17,327	6,463	440	–	–	–	35,583
Trois-Rivières	PQ	Lib	11,034	40.80%	880	3.25%	PQ	ADQ	72.51%	11,034	10,154	5,181	214	–	110	350	27,043
Ungava	PQ	PQ	5,744	50.11%	1,486	12.96%	Lib	ADQ	50.52%	4,258	5,744	1,460	–	–	–	–	11,462
Vachon	PQ	PQ	12,960	40.45%	219	0.68%	Lib	ADQ	73.91%	12,741	12,960	5,540	279	–	–	519	32,039
Vanier	PQ	Lib	16,182	42.83%	4,536	12.00%	ADQ	PQ	76.75%	16,182	9,385	11,646	573	–	–	–	37,786
Vaudreuil	Lib	Lib	18,490	57.67%	9,016	28.12%	PQ	ADQ	74.03%	18,490	9,474	3,487	–	–	–	608	32,059
Verchères	PQ	PQ	16,963	54.78%	8,243	26.62%	Lib	ADQ	77.70%	8,720	16,963	4,585	195	–	–	505	30,968
Verdun	Lib	Lib	15,185	52.52%	6,403	22.15%	PQ	ADQ	63.01%	15,185	8,782	3,269	368	658	54	595	28,911
Viau	Lib	Lib	17,703	65.13%	11,561	42.53%	PQ	ADQ	62.81%	17,703	6,142	2,406	384	–	121	426	27,182
Vimont	PQ	Lib	17,908	46.31%	5,043	13.04%	PQ	ADQ	76.04%	17,908	12,865	7,227	269	403	–	–	38,672
Westmount-Saint-Louis	Lib	Lib	18,330	80.23%	15,958	69.84%	PQ	ADQ	52.86%	18,330	2,372	959	718	–	–	469	22,848

= open seat
= turnout is above provincial average
= winning candidate was in previous Legislature
= incumbent had switched allegiance
= previously incumbent in another riding
= not incumbent; was previously elected to the Legislature
= incumbency arose from byelection gain
= other incumbents renominated
= previously an MP in the House of Commons of Canada
= multiple candidates

=== Comparative analysis for ridings (2003 vs 1998) ===
Summary of riding results by turnout and vote share for winning candidate (vs 1998)
Riding and winning party			Turnout		Vote share	
Riding and winning party			%	Change (pp)	%	Change (pp)
Abitibi-Est	PLQ	Gain	66.41	-7.86	42.86	5.69
Abitibi-Ouest	PQ	Hold	66.77	-7.62	45.44	-14.04
Acadie	PLQ	Hold	65.66	-12.39	70.39	-4.79
Anjou	PLQ	Hold	73.30	-9.01	53.69	9.18
Argenteuil	PLQ	Hold	66.46	-11.84	53.33	10.86
Arthabaska	PLQ	Gain	73.62	-7.44	36.77	3.13
Beauce-Nord	ADQ	Gain	75.96	-4.01	45.88	31.46
Beauce-Sud	PLQ	Hold	72.45	-3.63	43.80	-4.97
Beauharnois	PQ	New	74.32	New	44.83	New
Bellechasse	PLQ	Gain	76.10	-3.08	37.58	-0.84
Berthier	PQ	Hold	69.37	-10.14	35.00	-18.59
Bertrand	PQ	Hold	70.37	-7.02	43.33	-3.30
Blainville	PQ	Hold	74.72	-8.10	42.73	-8.26
Bonaventure	PLQ	Hold	70.40	-5.23	60.08	12.85
Borduas	PQ	Hold	77.84	-5.67	46.82	-8.60
Bourassa-Sauvé	PLQ	New	64.22	New	61.07	New
Bourget	PQ	Hold	71.33	-8.21	45.42	-2.31
Brome-Missisquoi	PLQ	Hold	70.44	-10.12	55.64	-1.53
Chambly	PLQ	Gain	78.45	-6.18	41.85	6.40
Champlain	PQ	Hold	57.70	-24.73	38.35	-8.93
Chapleau	PLQ	Hold	58.70	-12.56	62.39	3.17
Charlesbourg	PLQ	Gain	79.06	-3.13	44.46	3.55
Charlevoix	PQ	Hold	71.69	-4.80	43.63	-12.98
Châteauguay	PLQ	Hold	74.33	-9.84	51.80	4.88
Chauveau	PLQ	Gain	76.87	-1.72	40.10	2.76
Chicoutimi	PQ	Hold	71.89	-2.93	43.71	-13.56
Chomedey	PLQ	Hold	66.86	-12.38	71.10	1.23
Chutes-de-la-Chaudière	ADQ	Gain	80.39	-1.57	38.82	20.17
Crémazie	PLQ	Gain	73.43	-7.90	44.26	-0.08
D'Arcy-McGee	PLQ	Hold	61.64	-14.53	91.29	0.68
Deux-Montagnes	PQ	Hold	74.37	-6.71	39.04	-7.99
Drummond	PQ	Hold	70.49	-9.23	40.92	-11.43
Dubuc	PQ	Hold	68.07	-6.62	38.90	-20.91
Duplessis	PQ	Hold	63.46	-5.98	47.90	-11.42
Fabre	PLQ	Gain	75.49	-8.69	46.85	6.34
Frontenac	PLQ	Gain	77.77	-4.35	43.65	2.24
Gaspé	PQ	Hold	68.72	-5.89	47.40	-3.01
Gatineau	PLQ	Hold	60.58	-12.84	60.69	-0.84
Gouin	PQ	Hold	68.02	-6.38	53.34	0.66
Groulx	PLQ	Gain	73.52	-6.98	39.54	4.06
Hochelaga-Maisonneuve	PQ	Hold	60.09	-7.92	55.77	-4.84
Hull	PLQ	Hold	58.46	-12.41	57.25	-2.05
Huntingdon	PLQ	New	72.35	New	52.53	New
Iberville	PLQ	Gain	73.75	-7.53	39.15	3.86
Îles-de-la-Madeleine	PQ	Hold	77.43	-10.14	58.69	6.15
Jacques-Cartier	PLQ	Hold	70.24	-9.38	86.79	3.12
Jean-Lesage	PLQ	Hold	72.24	-2.97	44.22	1.88
Jeanne-Mance–Viger	PLQ	New	67.70	New	79.89	New
Jean-Talon	PLQ	Hold	80.45	-4.60	45.60	0.26
Johnson	PQ	Hold	72.74	-8.22	40.62	-7.71
Joliette	PQ	Hold	71.43	-9.26	39.48	-16.67
Jonquière	PLQ	Gain	70.68	-6.23	44.42	25.07
Kamouraska-Témiscouata	PLQ	Hold	70.90	-3.82	45.75	2.26
La Prairie	PLQ	Gain	75.91	-6.87	41.58	10.61
Labelle	PQ	Hold	68.68	-7.33	46.57	-12.04
Lac-Saint-Jean	PQ	Hold	69.58	-7.20	53.71	-16.85
LaFontaine	PLQ	Hold	70.82	-9.24	69.53	11.95
La Peltrie	PLQ	Gain	79.01	-5.36	41.47	5.78
La Pinière	PLQ	Hold	69.96	-10.74	64.36	3.62
Laporte	PLQ	Hold	71.80	-8.48	55.22	2.37
L'Assomption	PQ	Hold	75.16	-6.63	43.40	-8.09
Laurier-Dorion	PLQ	Hold	64.36	-11.85	53.14	-3.57
Laval-des-Rapides	PLQ	Gain	69.82	-9.03	44.73	3.95
Laviolette	PLQ	Gain	72.18	-6.90	52.67	17.77
Lévis	PLQ	Gain	77.56	-2.36	35.12	-0.05
Lotbinière	ADQ	Gain	77.57	-3.89	37.45	23.00
Louis-Hébert	PLQ	Gain	81.12	0.25	44.53	4.12
Marguerite-Bourgeoys	PLQ	Hold	68.14	-11.78	70.44	2.29
Marguerite-D'Youville	PLQ	Gain	81.93	-4.74	41.38	10.85
Marie-Victorin	PQ	Hold	67.05	-8.19	45.39	-6.30
Marquette	PLQ	Hold	66.11	-11.71	65.06	8.62
Maskinongé	PLQ	Gain	74.62	-6.00	38.16	1.60
Masson	PQ	Hold	70.86	10.71	44.83	-19.20
Matane	PLQ	Gain	67.56	-5.41	40.84	6.82
Matapédia	PQ	Hold	68.97	-5.43	45.48	-11.99
Mégantic-Compton	PLQ	Hold	72.38	-7.51	47.09	-3.40
Mercier	PQ	Hold	69.56	-5.71	45.26	-10.12
Mille-Îles	PLQ	Gain	76.14	-8.25	50.18	8.73
Mirabel	PQ	New	72.02	New	38.33	New
Montmagny-L'Islet	PLQ	Hold	72.34	-2.98	41.17	-4.83
Montmorency	PLQ	Gain	77.09	-3.64	36.78	3.23
Mont-Royal	PLQ	Hold	59.60	-13.16	80.91	0.67
Nelligan	PLQ	Hold	69.65	-10.26	77.60	1.92
Nicolet-Yamaska	PQ	Hold	77.82	-6.77	41.21	-9.02
Notre-Dame-de-Grâce	PLQ	Hold	61.80	-12.12	74.59	-3.03
Orford	PLQ	Hold	71.42	-9.90	49.48	-1.48
Outremont	PLQ	Hold	62.81	-10.98	53.90	-4.41
Papineau	PLQ	Hold	61.03	-13.90	58.02	3.25
Pointe-aux-Trembles	PQ	Hold	72.30	-6.49	50.19	-3.63
Pontiac	PLQ	Hold	55.44	-19.15	76.52	1.25
Portneuf	PLQ	Gain	77.07	-3.63	39.44	1.54
Prévost	PQ	Hold	69.30	-8.59	45.16	-8.27
Réne-Lévesque	PQ	Hold	63.07	-6.41	40.86	-21.78
Richelieu	PQ	Hold	72.93	-8.06	46.36	-9.95
Richmond	PLQ	Hold	73.80	-8.10	57.20	4.14
Rimouski	PQ	Hold	71.07	-4.37	47.71	-8.65
Rivière-du-Loup	ADQ	Hold	72.66	-4.14	57.23	10.89
Robert-Baldwin	PLQ	Hold	65.26	-12.80	85.87	1.80
Roberval	PLQ	Gain	68.45	-4.67	39.17	14.38
Rosemont	PQ	Hold	71.32	-6.03	43.77	-4.18
Rousseau	PQ	Hold	64.97	-10.98	47.85	-7.50
Rouyn-Noranda–Témiscamingue	PLQ	Gain	67.42	-8.83	36.46	-1.90
Saint-François	PLQ	Hold	71.67	-7.93	52.32	1.33
Saint-Henri-Sainte-Anne	PLQ	Hold	61.04	-12.72	52.91	4.56
Saint-Hyacinthe	PQ	Hold	74.72	-7.02	39.33	-10.27
Saint-Jean	PLQ	Gain	72.34	-8.89	40.75	2.74
Saint-Laurent	PLQ	Hold	63.61	-13.17	77.66	-0.37
Saint-Maurice	PQ	Hold	72.67	-8.01	34.72	-14.80
Sainte-Marie–Saint-Jacques	PQ	Hold	61.51	-6.00	49.84	-3.10
Shefford	PLQ	Hold	69.91	-10.71	46.28	9.01
Sherbrooke	PLQ	Hold	73.49	-6.25	46.95	-0.46
Soulanges	PLQ	New	74.19	New	50.99	New
Taillon	PQ	Hold	71.02	-6.93	45.85	-7.17
Taschereau	PQ	Hold	69.37	-4.47	38.95	-8.05
Terrebonne	PQ	Hold	73.31	-7.72	48.69	-10.78
Trois-Rivières	PLQ	Gain	72.51	-6.40	40.80	-0.28
Ungava	PQ	Hold	50.52	-11.40	50.11	1.89
Vachon	PQ	Hold	73.91	-7.94	40.45	-9.30
Vanier	PLQ	Gain	76.75	-1.05	42.83	5.64
Vaudreuil	PLQ	Hold	74.03	-7.75	57.67	5.76
Verchères	PQ	Hold	77.70	-5.52	54.78	-5.86
Verdun	PLQ	Hold	63.01	-12.69	52.52	-0.23
Viau	PLQ	Hold	62.81	-10.74	65.13	-4.95
Vimont	PLQ	Gain	76.04	-8.66	46.31	4.94
Westmount-Saint-Louis	PLQ	Hold	52.86	-13.39	80.23	1.06

=== Summary analysis ===
Party candidates in 2nd place
Party in 1st place	Party in 2nd place			Total
Party in 1st place	Lib	PQ	ADQ	Total
Liberal		65	11	76
Parti Québécois	42		3	45
Action démocratique	4			4
Total	46	65	14	125

Candidates ranked 1st to 5th place, by party
Parties	1st	2nd	3rd	4th	5th
█ Liberal	76	46	3		
█ Parti Québécois	45	65	15		
█ Action démocratique	4	14	105	2	
█ UFP			2	44	27
█ Bloc Pot				28	19
█ Green				26	9
█ Independent				9	9
█ Equality				4	7
█ Marxist–Leninist				2	5
█ Christian Democracy					7

Resulting composition of the National Assembly (2003)
Source		Party			
Source		Lib	PQ	ADQ	Total
Seats retained	Incumbents returned	33	35	1	69
Seats retained	Open seats held	8	4		12
Seats retained	Byelection losses reversed		4		4
Seats changing hands	Incumbents defeated	15		2	17
Seats changing hands	Open seats gained	11		1	12
Seats changing hands	Open - taken by previous incumbent from another riding	1			1
Seats changing hands	Byelection gains held	2			2
New seats	Previously incumbent in another riding	3	1		4
New seats	New MNAs	1	1		2
Total		76	45	4	125

== See also ==
- Liste de sondages sur les élections générales québécoises de 2003 Opinion polling for the 2003 Quebec general election
- Politics of Quebec
- List of premiers of Quebec
- List of leaders of the Official Opposition (Quebec)
- National Assembly of Quebec
- 2007 Quebec general election
- Timeline of Quebec history
- Political parties in Quebec
- 37th National Assembly of Quebec
