= Anna Mancuso =

Canadian politician, lawyer, and businessperson

Member of the National Assembly of Quebec for Viger
- In office 2002–2003
- Preceded by: Cosmo Maciocia
- Succeeded by: District was dissolved.

Personal details
- Born: May 18, 1971 (age 55) Montreal, Quebec
- Party: Liberal

Anna Mancuso (born May 18, 1971) is a former Canadian politician, lawyer, and businessperson.

Born in Montreal, Quebec, Mancuso graduated from Marianopolis College in 1990 before studying at the University for Foreigners Perugia. In 1993, she received a bachelor's degree from Concordia University. She also studied at the University of Ottawa and at the University of Lyon. She was called to the Quebec Bar in 1997.

In 2002, she was elected to the National Assembly of Quebec in a by-election held in Viger. A Liberal, she did not run in the 2003 election. From 2003 to 2005, she was a political advisor in the Office of the Premier of Quebec. From 2005 to 2006, she was the Chief of Staff in the Ministry of Immigration and Cultural Communities. Since 2006, she has been the CEO of MaCo Architectural Millwork, a custom-built furniture and architectural millwork.
