= François Corriveau =

Canadian politician (born 1969)

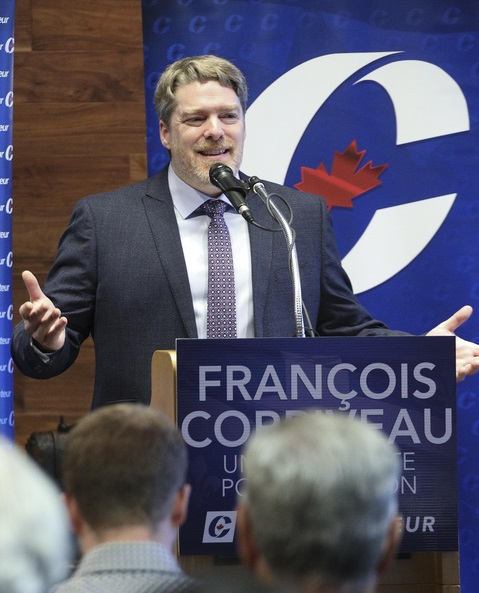

Member of the National Assembly of Quebec for René-Lévesque
- In office 2002–2003
- Preceded by: Gabriel-Yvan Gagnon
- Succeeded by: Marjolain Dufour

Personal details
- Born: Baie-Comeau, Quebec, Canada
- Party: Conservative (federal); ADQ/CAQ (provincial)

François Corriveau (born November 7, 1969) is a politician in Quebec, Canada, and was the Action démocratique du Québec (ADQ) Member of the National Assembly for the electoral district of Saguenay (now known as René-Lévesque), in the Côte-Nord region, from 2002 to 2003.

== Background ==
He was born in Baie-Comeau and is the son of a judge. He graduated from the Université Laval in 1992 with a B.A. in Law and was admitted to the Bar of Quebec in 1993. He served as Baie-Comeau's deputy clerk from 1994 to 2002 and from 2003 to 2008.

== Member of the Provincial Legislature ==
Corriveau was first elected to the National Assembly in a by-election held on April 15, 2002 with 48% of the vote. Liberal candidate Isabelle Melançon finished second with 28% of the vote.

Corriveau was only the second ADQ member ever to be elected to the National Assembly. His victory surprised most observers and temporarily boosted the ADQ's exposure in the media.

In the 2003 election, Corriveau finished second with 33% of the vote, behind Parti Québécois (PQ) candidate Marjolain Dufour (41%).

== Federal politics ==
In December 2006, Corriveau clinched the Conservative nomination for a seat in the riding of Manicouagan in the 2008 federal election. However, he declared in August 2008 that he was renouncing his candidacy in order to become clerk of the city of Baie-Comeau. He is still in good terms with the Conservative Party. Corriveau's replacement as Manicouagan's Conservative nominee was pharmacist Pierre Breton.

Corriveau was named the Conservative candidate for the riding of Manicouagan again for the 2019 federal election, finishing third.

== Electoral record ==
=== Federal ===
2019 Canadian federal election: Manicouagan
Party	Candidate	Votes	%	±%	Expenditures
Bloc Québécois	Marilène Gill	21,768	53.90	+12.65	$18,875.24
Liberal	Dave Savard	7,793	19.29	-10.08	$36,651.32
Conservative	François Corriveau	7,771	19.24	+8.97	$30,489.35
New Democratic	Colleen McCool	1,482	3.67	-13.84	$0.33
Green	Jacques Gélineau	1,293	3.20	+1.6	none listed
People's	Gabriel Côté	283	0.70		none listed
Total valid votes/expense limit		40,390	100.0		
Total rejected ballots		712			
Turnout		41,102	56.9		
Eligible voters		72,256			
Bloc Québécois hold		Swing		+11.37	
Source: Elections Canada

=== Provincial ===
2003 Quebec general election
Party	Candidate	Votes	%	±%
Parti Québécois	Marjolain Dufour	8,997	40.86	+16.91
Action démocratique	François Corriveau	7,356	33.41	-14.43
Liberal	François Désy	5,215	23.69	-4.52
Independent	Jean-Pierre Brisson	449	2.04	–
Total valid votes		22,017	99.15	–
Total rejected ballots		189	0.85	–
Turnout		22,206	63.07	+2.66
Electors on the lists		35,210	–	–

Quebec provincial by-election, April 15, 2002
Party	Candidate	Votes	%	±%
Action démocratique	François Corriveau	10,129	47.84	+31.44
Liberal	Isabelle Melançon	5,973	28.21	+7.89
Parti Québécois	Louise Levasseur	5,070	23.95	-38.69
Total valid votes		21,172	99.07	–
Total rejected ballots		199	0.93	–
Turnout		21,371	60.41	-8.06
Electors on the lists		35,378	–	–

== Footnotes ==
National Assembly of Quebec
Preceded by Gabriel-Yvan Gagnon (PQ)	MNA, District of Saguenay; 2002–2003	Succeeded by Marjolain Dufour (PQ)
Legal offices
Preceded by Sylvain Ouellet	Clerk of Baie-Comeau; 2008–Current	Succeeded by Incumbent
