= François Gaudreau =

Canadian politician

François Gaudreau (born February 17, 1957, in Montreal, Quebec) is a Canadian politician and was the Action démocratique du Québec Member of the National Assembly for the electoral district of Vimont from 2002 to 2003.

Gaudreau was first elected to the National Assembly in a by-election, held on June 17, 2002, with 50% of the vote. Liberal candidate Vincent Auclair finished second with 33% of the vote.

In the 2003 election, Gaudreau finished third with 19% of the vote. Auclair won, with 46% of the vote.

In the 2007 election, Gaudreau attempted to win the seat back from Auclair. He finished second with 31% of the vote. Auclair won with 36% of the vote.

He was the candidate for the CAQ in Sainte-Rose in the 2012 election.

== Electoral record (partial) ==
Quebec provincial by-election, June 17, 2002: Vimont
Party	Candidate	Votes	%	±%
Action démocratique	François Gaudreau	15,236	50.00	
Liberal	Vincent Auclair	10,109	33.17	
Parti Québécois	Manon Sauvé	4,918	16.14	
Independent	Régent Millette	212	0.70	
Total valid votes		30,475	100.00	
Rejected and declined votes		304		
Turnout		30,779	53.10	
Electors on the lists		57,961		

National Assembly of Quebec
Preceded by David Cliche (PQ)	MNA, District of Vimont; 2002–2003	Succeeded by Vincent Auclair (Liberal)
