= André Tranchemontagne =

Canadian politician

Member of the Quebec National Assembly for Mont-Royal
- In office 1998–2003
- Preceded by: John Ciaccia
- Succeeded by: Philippe Couillard

Personal details
- Born: October 15, 1939 Montreal, Quebec, Canada
- Died: November 28, 2016 (aged 77)
- Party: Liberal
- Occupation: businessman

André Tranchemontagne (October 15, 1939 – November 28, 2016) was a Canadian politician. He was a one-term Member of the National Assembly of Quebec.

== Early life ==
Tranchemontagne was born in Montreal, Quebec in 1939 to Willie Tranchemontagne, a local bricklayer, and Jeanne Beaubien. He received a Bachelor of Arts degree from Université de Montréal in 1961 and a Bachelor of Commerce degree from HEC Montréal in 1964.

While he started his career with National Railways, most of his professional life was with Molson Brewery, where he served in a variety of different research and marketing positions.

During this time, he also served on a variety of local boards. Tranchemontagne was president of the 1977 Quebec Winter Carnival, and was the head of the launch committee for the Montreal Manic soccer team between 1980 and 1981.

== Political life ==
Tranchemontagne was elected in the 1998 election as a MNA for Mont-Royal. As the Parti Québécois formed a majority government in that election, Tranchemontagne, as a Liberal, was part of the official opposition.

Tranchemontagne decided not to run in the 2003 election. In his post-political career, he served on the board for TVA Group. He died on November 28, 2016.
