= Danielle Doyer =

Canadian politician and teacher

MNA for Matapédia
- In office September 12, 1994 – 2012
- Preceded by: Henri Paradis
- Succeeded by: riding dissolved

Personal details
- Born: December 17, 1951 (age 74) Mont-Joli, Quebec
- Party: Parti Québécois
- Profession: teacher
- Portfolio: health care and service accessibility, regions and rurality

Danielle Doyer (born December 17, 1951, in Mont-Joli, Quebec) is a Quebec politician and teacher. She is the current Member of National Assembly of Quebec for the riding of Matapédia in the Gaspésie region. She is a member of the Parti Québécois and MNA since 1994.

Doyer studied at the Université du Québec à Rimouski and obtained a bachelor's degree in sociology and a master's degree in regional development. From 1972 to 1984 she was the co-owner of an agricultural business and was a research agent for several councils and centers in health, social services and human resources. She would also teach at Collège de la Gaspésie et des Iles de la Madeleine and the CEGEP de Rimouski from 1989 to 1994 before joining the Parti Québécois in 1994 after being elected in Matapedia. Prior to that, she was a candidate in Gaspé in the 1989 elections and the president of the party for the region and the Gaspé riding. She was also named the Personality of the Year for the Mont-Joli region in 1999.

After being elected in 1994, she was a backbencher member for the full mandate. She was re-elected in 1998 and named the Parliamentary Secretary for the Minister of Regions. She was later re-elected for new mandates in 2003 and 2007 and served as critic for mines, forest, wildlife and regions.
