= Pierre-Étienne Laporte =

Canadian politician (1934–2020)

MNA for Outremont
- In office 1996–2003
- Preceded by: Gérald Tremblay
- Succeeded by: Yves Séguin

Personal details
- Born: September 23, 1934 Joliette, Quebec, Canada
- Died: January 30, 2020 (aged 85) Montreal, Quebec, Canada
- Party: Liberal

Pierre-Étienne Laporte (French pronunciation: [pjɛʁ etjɛn lapɔʁt]; September 23, 1934 – January 30, 2020) was a Canadian politician, who represented the electoral district of Outremont in the National Assembly of Quebec from 1996 to 2003. He was a member of the Quebec Liberal Party.
