= Parti marxiste–léniniste du Québec candidates in the 2008 Quebec provincial election =

The Parti marxiste–léniniste du Québec fielded twenty-three candidates in the 2008 provincial election, none of whom were elected. Information about these candidates may be found on this page.

== Candidates ==
=== Chapleau: Pierre Soublière ===
Pierre Soublière, a teacher, has been a Marxist-Leninist party candidate in four federal and four provincial elections. He has also contributed articles to the party's paper, TML Daily. He is a member of NOWAR-PAIX; during the 2008 election, he called for an anti-war government and for people from the workplace to be elected to parliament.

Electoral record
Election	Division	Party	Votes	%	Place	Winner
1979 federal	Hull	Marxist-Leninist	106	0.24	7/7	Gaston Isabelle, Liberal
1980 federal	Hull	Marxist-Leninist	70	0.17	6/6	Gaston Isabelle, Liberal
1981 provincial	Hull	Marxist-Leninist	35	0.11	7/7	Gilles Rocheleau, Liberal
1989 provincial	Hull	Marxist-Leninist	72	0.28	6/6	Robert LeSage, Liberal
1997 federal	Hull—Aylmer	Marxist-Leninist	151	0.32	9/9	Marcel Massé, Liberal
2007 provincial	Chapleau	Marxist-Leninist	65	0.20	6/6	Benoît Pelletier, Liberal
2008 federal	Ottawa Centre	Marxist-Leninist	95	0.15	6/6	Paul Dewar, New Democratic Party
2008 provincial	Chapleau	Marxist-Leninist	51	0.20	7/7	Marc Carrière, Liberal

=== Châteauguay: Hélène Héroux ===
Hélène Héroux has been a Marxist-Leninist candidate in six federal and six provincial elections. In 2006, she identified as a cashier.

Electoral record
Election	Division	Party	Votes	%	Place	Winner
1988 federal	Laurier—Sainte-Marie	N/A (Marxist-Leninist)	130	0.32	7/8	Jean-Claude Malepart, Liberal
1989 provincial	Saint-Louis	Marxist-Leninist	114	0.51	8/9	Jacques Chagnon, Liberal
1993 federal	Rosemont	Marxist-Leninist	189	0.40	6/7	Benoît Tremblay, Bloc Québécois
1994 provincial	Mercier	Marxist-Leninist	102	0.33	9/9	Robert Perreault, Parti Québécois
1997 federal	Mercier	Marxist-Leninist	297	0.62	5/5	Francine Lalonde, Bloc Québécois
1998 provincial	Bourget	Marxist-Leninist	89	0.33	6/7	Diane Lemieux, Parti Québécois
2000 federal	Anjou—Rivière-des-Prairies	Marxist-Leninist	151	0.31	7/7	Yvon Charbonneau, Liberal
2003 provincial	Anjou	Marxist-Leninist	266	0.81	4/4	Lise Thériault, Liberal
2004 federal	Honoré-Mercier	Marxist-Leninist	164	0.34	7/7	Pablo Rodríguez, Liberal
2006 federal	Honoré-Mercier	Marxist-Leninist	183	0.36	6/6	Pablo Rodríguez, Liberal
2007 provincial	Anjou	Marxist-Leninist	99	0.31	6/6	Lise Thériault, Liberal
2008 provincial	Châteauguay	Marxist-Leninist	114	0.35	7/7	Pierre Moreau, Liberal

=== Hull: Gabriel Girard-Bernier ===
Gabriel Girard-Bernier is a political activist in the Outaouais region. He was the student association president at Cégep de l'Outaouais and has been active in the Canadian anti-war movement. A 2006 article listed him as a twenty-two-year-old journalism student. He has been a Marxist-Leninist candidate in three federal elections and three provincial elections and has written for TML Daily, the party's paper. In 2008, Girard-Bernier wrote a piece condemning the New Democratic Party's support for "asymmetrical federalism" and supporting Quebec's right to self-determination up to and including the right of succession.

Electoral record
Election	Division	Party	Votes	%	Place	Winner
2003 provincial	Chapleau	Marxist-Leninist	122	0.41	6/6	Benoît Pelletier, Liberal
2004 federal	Gatineau	Marxist-Leninist	125	0.27	7/7	Françoise Boivin, Liberal
2006 federal	Hull—Aylmer	Marxist-Leninist	125	0.23	6/6	Marcel Proulx, Liberal
2007 provincial	Hull	Marxist-Leninist	67	0.23	6/6	Roch Cholette, Liberal
2008 federal	Hull—Aylmer	Marxist-Leninist	121	0.23	6/6	Marcel Proulx, Liberal
2008 provincial	Hull	Marxist-Leninist	97	0.43	6/6	Maryse Gaudreault, Liberal

=== Notre-Dame-de-Grâce: Linda Sullivan ===
Linda Sullivan has run as a Marxist-Leninist candidate in three federal and three provincial elections. She identified as a student in 2006 and as an events coordinator in 2008.

Electoral record
Election	Division	Party	Votes	%	Place	Winner
2003 provincial	Acadie	Marxist-Leninist	111	0.34	6/7	Yvan Bordeleau, Liberal
2004 federal	Outremont	Marxist-Leninist	120	0.31	7/7	Jean Lapierre, Liberal
2006 federal	Outremont	Marxist-Leninist	88	0.22	8/11	Jean Lapierre, Liberal
2007 provincial	Notre-Dame-de-Grâce	Marxist-Leninist	69	0.30	6/6	Russell Copeman, Liberal
2008 federal	Westmount—Ville-Marie	Marxist-Leninist	49	0.13	7/9	Marc Garneau, Liberal
2008 provincial	Notre-Dame-de-Grâce	Marxist-Leninist	124	0.73	5/6	Kathleen Weil, Liberal
