= 2008 Quebec provincial by-elections =

Provincial by-elections were held in Quebec on 12 May 2008 to fill three vacancies in the National Assembly. The by-elections were called on 9 April 2008.

All three seats were held by their incumbent parties.

== Bourget ==
The district of Bourget was vacated by Parti Québécois MNA Diane Lemieux on 17 October 2007. Federal Bloc Québécois MP Maka Kotto resigned from the House of Commons of Canada to contest the by-election, which in turn resulted in the federal Saint-Lambert by-election of September 8, 2008.

Bourget by-election, 12 May 2008 resignation of Diane Lemieux
Party	Candidate	Votes	%	±%
Parti Québécois	Maka Kotto	6575	40.66	-0.60
Liberal Party	Lyn Thériault	5161	31.92	+9.07
Green	Scott McKay	1839	11.37	+3.28
Action démocratique	Denis Mondor	1520	9.40	-13.61
Québec solidaire	Gaétan Legault	700	4.33	+0.14
Parti indépendantiste	Richard Gervais	376	2.33	–

== Hull ==
The riding of Hull was vacated by Liberal MNA Roch Cholette on 9 April 2008.

Hull by-election, 12 May 2008 resignation of Roch Cholette
Party	Candidate	Votes	%	±%
Liberal Party	Maryse Gaudreault	7403	45.21	+2.68
Parti Québécois	Gilles Aubé	5559	33.95	+10.02
Québec solidaire	Bill Clennett	1589	9.70	+1.77
Green	Brian Gibb	1185	7.24	-1.09
Action démocratique	Jean-Philip Ruel	529	3.23	-13.83
Parti indépendantiste	Jean-Roch Villemaire	111	0.68	–

== Pointe-aux-Trembles ==
Pointe-aux-Trembles was vacated by PQ MNA André Boisclair on 15 November 2007. The by-election was won by Nicole Léger, Boisclair's predecessor as MNA for the riding.

Pointe-aux-Trembles by-election, 12 May 2008 resignation of André Boisclair
Party	Candidate	Votes	%	±%
Parti Québécois	Nicole Léger	7657	55.99	+8.69
Liberal Party	Mélissa Dumais	2987	21.84	+3.60
Action démocratique	Diane Bellemare	1882	13.76	-12.69
Green	Xavier Daxhelet	661	4.83	+0.52
Québec solidaire	Marie Josèphe Pigeon	226	1.65	-0.97
Parti indépendantiste	Colette Provost	153	1.12	–
Independent	Gérald Briand	78	0.57	–
Independent	Régent Millette	31	0.23	–
