= Robert LeSage =

Canadian politician (born 1937)

Robert LeSage (born February 15, 1937) is a retired Canadian politician and civil servant. He served in the National Assembly of Quebec from 1989 to 1998 as a member of the Liberal Party. His name is sometimes given as Lesage.

== Early life and career ==
LeSage was born in Hull (Gatineau), Quebec, and studied legislation and administration at the École des hautes études commerciales at Carleton University in Ottawa. He became a civil servant in Hull in 1961 and served for nineteen years as the city's clerk. He was president of the Liberal Party association in Hull from 1979 to 1981.

== Legislator ==
LeSage entered political life in 1989, winning the Liberal nomination for a provincial by-election in Hull. While seeking the nomination, he championed a four-lane highway extension from Hull to Aylmer through the southern end of Gatineau Park and dismissed concerns from environmentalists that it would jeopardize the area's wildlife. He was elected without difficulty in the by-election and was returned again in the 1989 general election a few months later. The Liberal Party had a majority government in this period, and LeSage served as a backbench supporter of Robert Bourassa's administration. He supported Bourassa's compromise language legislation, which required that outdoor commercial signs be in the French language while indoor signs were allowed to be bilingual. He was also a supporter of the Meech Lake Accord, which was designed to recognize Quebec as a "distinct society" within the Canadian constitution.

The Meech Lake Accord was rejected in June 1990. LeSage was critical of Queen Elizabeth II's visit to Hull shortly thereafter, saying "Perhaps the queen wants to celebrate the grand Canadian unity, but it doesn't exist."

A Canadian federalist, LeSage was appointed to a legislative committee to study the costs of Quebec sovereigntism in 1991. In 1993, he suggested that the Outaouais region would separate from Quebec (and remain a part of Canada) if Quebec ever chose to separate from Canada. He was quoted as saying, "it's almost criminal to promote Quebec sovereignty in the Outaouais because the federal government is so important to the area's survival.

As a backbencher, LeSage was a vocal proponent of building the Casino du Hull. The casino was eventually constructed in 1996, two years after its approval by the Liberal government.

LeSage was re-elected in the 1994 provincial election, defeating former mayor Michel Légère. The Liberals lost power to the Parti Québécois, and LeSage served as his party's critic for Revenue in the official opposition. He campaigned for the "Non" side in the 1995 Quebec referendum on sovereignty.

LeSage offered to resign his seat in 1998 to allow Jean Charest to enter the National Assembly (he made this offer when Charest was being encouraged to seek the leadership of the Quebec Liberal Party, but before he had decided to leave federal politics). Charest ultimately did not take up LeSage's offer and instead ran in Sherbrooke in the 1998 provincial election. LeSage did not seek re-election in this campaign.

== Electoral record ==
1994 Quebec general election: Hull
Party	Candidate	Votes	%
Liberal	Robert LeSage	19,184	56.56
Parti Québécois	Michel Légère	13,947	41.12
Lemon	Denis Patenaude	452	1.33
Natural Law	Michel Dubois	231	0.68
Commonwealth of Canada	Harold Quesnel	56	0.17
Marxist–Leninist	Françoise Roy	46	0.14
Total valid votes		33,916	
Rejected and declined votes		291	
Turnout		34,207	78.33
Electors on the lists		43,670	

1989 Quebec general election: Hull
Party	Candidate	Votes	%
Liberal	Robert LeSage	13,980	55.25
Parti Québécois	Marcel Villeneuve	9,434	37.29
Unity	Glen E.P. Kealey	751	2.97
New Democratic	Charles Rheault	673	2.66
Lemon	Denis Patenaude	391	1.55
Marxist–Leninist	Pierre Soublière	72	0.28
Total valid votes		25,301	100.00
Rejected and declined votes		279	
Turnout		25,580	62.23
Electors on the lists		41,107	

Quebec provincial by-election, May 29, 1989: Hull
Party	Candidate	Votes	%	±%
Liberal	Robert LeSage	9,223	67.16	
Parti Québécois	Paul Lemaire	4,510	32.84	
Total valid votes		13,733	100.00	
Rejected and declined votes		291		
Turnout		14,024	35.46	
Electors on the lists		39,544		
Source: Official Results, Government of Quebec
