= Joseph Caron (politician) =

Canadian politician

Member of the Legislative Assembly of Quebec for Ottawa
- In office 1917–1919
- Preceded by: Ferdinand-Ambroise Gendron
- Succeeded by: District was abolished in 1919

Member of the Legislative Assembly of Quebec for Hull
- In office 1919–1923
- Preceded by: District was created in 1919
- Succeeded by: Joseph-Roméo Lafond

Personal details
- Born: March 9, 1868 Saint-Barthélémi, Quebec
- Died: June 28, 1954 (aged 86) Ottawa, Ontario
- Party: Liberal
- Relations: Alexis Caron, nephew

Joseph Caron (March 9, 1868 – July 28, 1954) was a Quebec merchant and political figure. He represented the Ottawa electoral district from 1917 to 1919, and its successor electoral district Hull from 1919 to 1923, in the Legislative Assembly of Quebec as a Liberal.

He was born in Saint-Barthélemy, Quebec, the son of Norbert Caron and Herméline Mercure, and was educated at the Collège de Hull. In 1896, Caron married Margaret Theresa Burns. From 1906 to 1917, he was a school commissioner for Hull and also served three terms as president of the school commission. From 1907 to 1911, Caron was an alderman for Hull. Caron was first elected to the provincial assembly in a 1917 by-election held following the death of Ferdinand-Ambroise Gendron. He was reelected in 1919 but did not run for reelection in 1923. Caron died in Ottawa at the age of 86.

His nephew Alexis Caron later represented Hull in the Quebec assembly.
