= Parti marxiste–léniniste du Québec candidates in the 2012 Quebec provincial election =

The Parti marxiste–léniniste du Québec fielded twenty-five candidates in the 2012 provincial election, none of whom were elected.

== Candidates ==
Riding	Candidate's Name	Notes	Gender	Residence	Occupation	Votes	%	Rank
Anjou–Louis-Riel	Linda Sullivan					99	0.31	7/7
Bourget	Claude Brunelle	Brunelle is a perennial candidate. The 2012 Quebec election was the thirteenth that he contested for the Marxist-Leninist Party.			Teacher	68	0.19	9/10
Chapleau	Pierre Soublière					86	0.24	7/7
Charlesbourg	Pierre Chénier					53	0.13	10/10
Gatineau	Yvon Breton					87	0.24	7/7
Hochelaga-Maisonneuve	Christine Dandenault	Dandenault is a perennial candidate. The 2012 Quebec election was the nineteenth that she contested for the Marxist-Leninist Party.			Secretary	84	0.30	9/10
Hull	Gabriel Girard Bernier					72	0.22	9/9
Jeanne-Mance–Viger	Claude Moreau					64	0.20	9/10
Jean-Lesage	Garnet Colly					104	0.33	6/6
La Pinière	Serge Patenaude					62	0.15	9/9
La Prairie	Normand Chouinard	Chouinard is a perennial candidate. The 2012 Quebec election was the thirteenth that he contested for the Marxist-Leninist Party.			Truck driver	48	0.14	9/9
Laurier-Dorion	Peter Macrisopoulos					100	0.31	8/10
Laviolette	Jean-Paul Bédard					67	0.27	7/7
Marguerite-Bourgeoys	Yves Le Seigle					113	0.32	6/6
Mont-Royal	Diane Johnston					71	0.28	8/8
Notre-Dame-de-Grâce	Rachel Hoffman					74	0.28	7/7
Papineau	Alexandre Deschênes					115	0.31	8/8
Pointe-aux-Trembles	Geneviève Royer					73	0.24	8/8
Pontiac	Louis Lang					61	0.20	7/7
Rosemont	Stéphane Chénier	Chénier is a perennial candidate. The 2012 Quebec election was the ninth that he contested for the Marxist-Leninist Party.			Social worker	127	0.33	8/8
Sanguinet	Hélène Héroux					67	0.22	8/8
Sainte-Marie–Saint-Jacques	Serge Lachapelle					60	0.21	9/10
Saint-Laurent	Fernand Deschamps					91	0.27	8/8
Taillon	Normand Fournier					65	0.17	9/9
Verdun	Eileen Studd					58	0.17	8/8

Source: Résultats, Élections générales (2012, 4 septembre), Le Directeur général des élections du Québec, accessed 14 November 2012.
