= Clennett =

Clennett is a surname. Notable people with the surname include:

- Bill Clennett (fl. 1996–2008), Canadian anti-poverty protester
- John Clennett (born 1950), Australian rules footballer
