= PMLQ =

PMLQ may refer to:

- Pakistan Muslim League (Q)
- Parti marxiste-léniniste du Québec
