= 1994 Quebec general election =

Canadian provincial election

- September 12, 1994

125 seats in the 35th National Assembly of Quebec 63 seats were needed for a majority
- Turnout: 81.58% (▲6.56%)
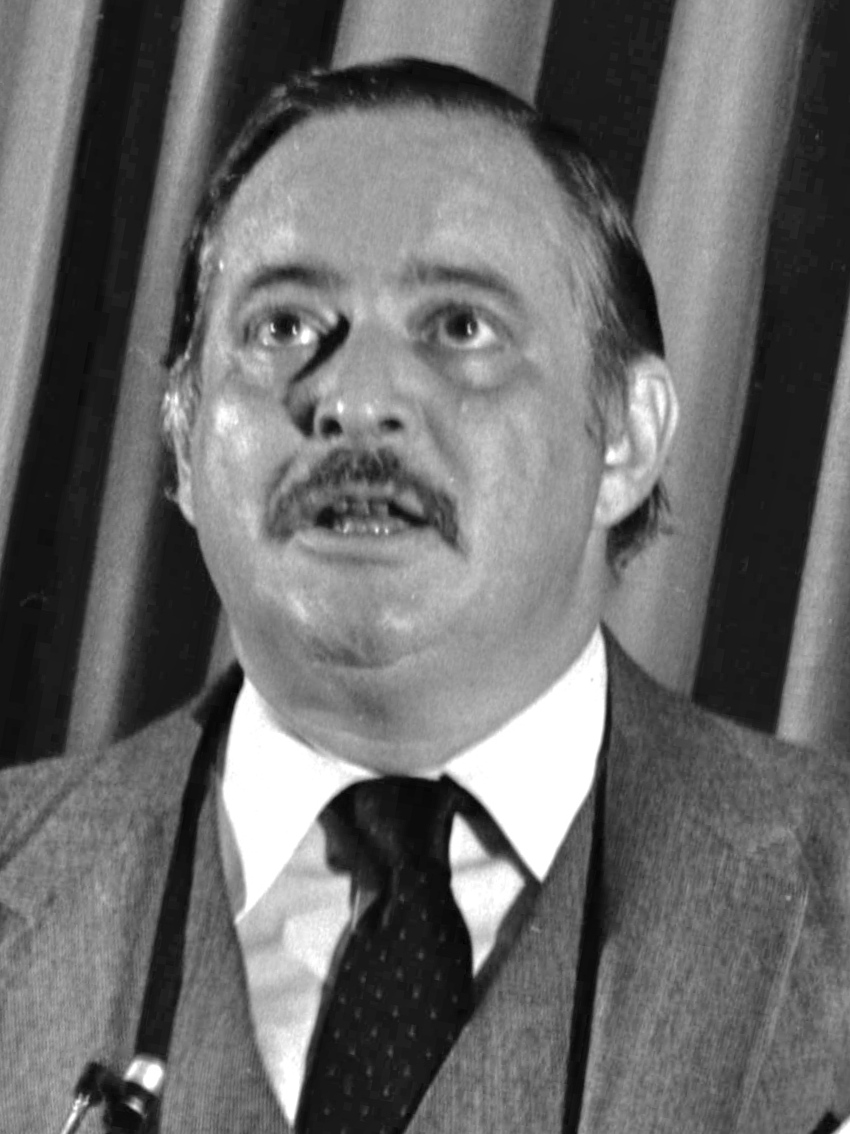

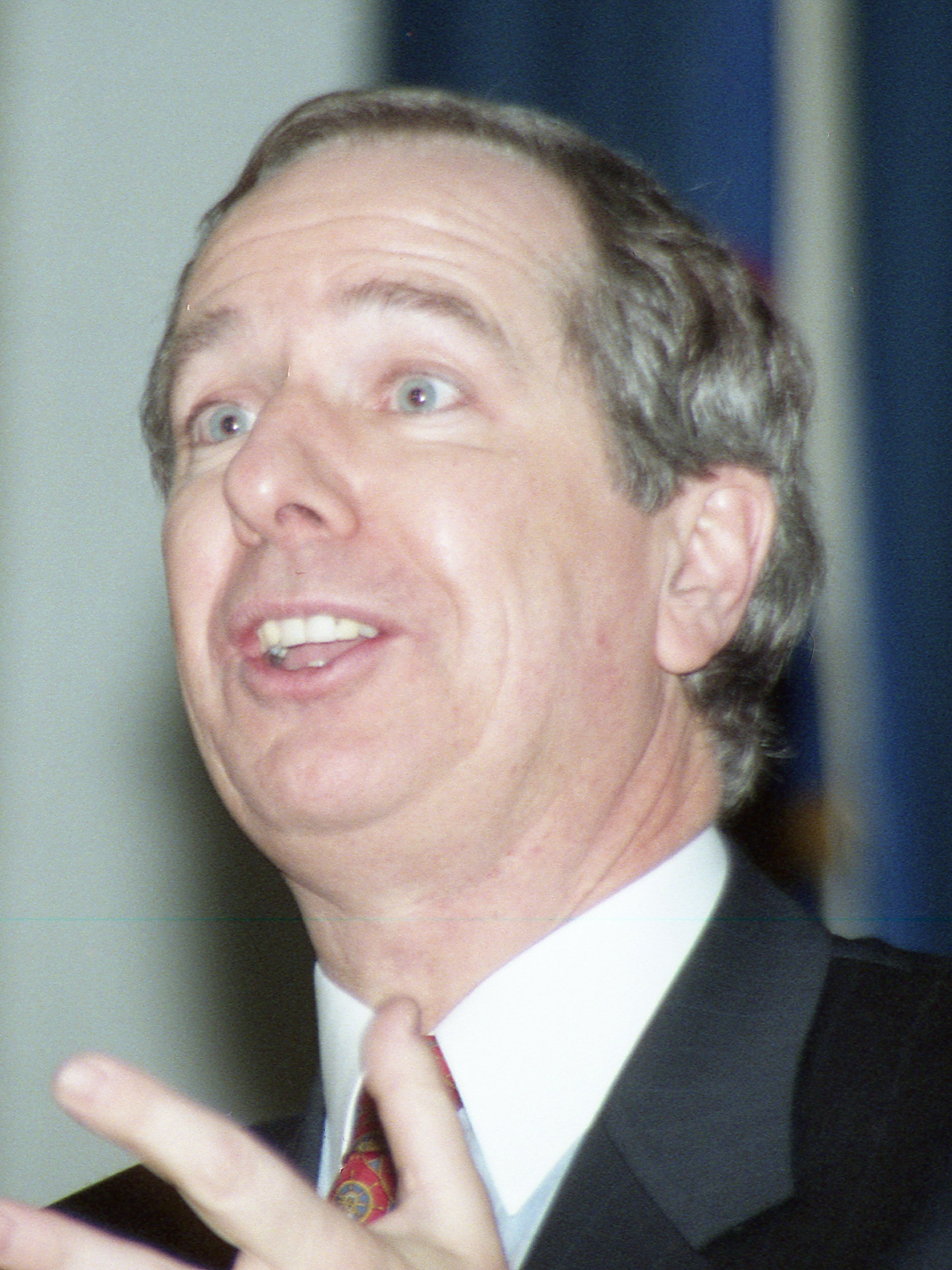

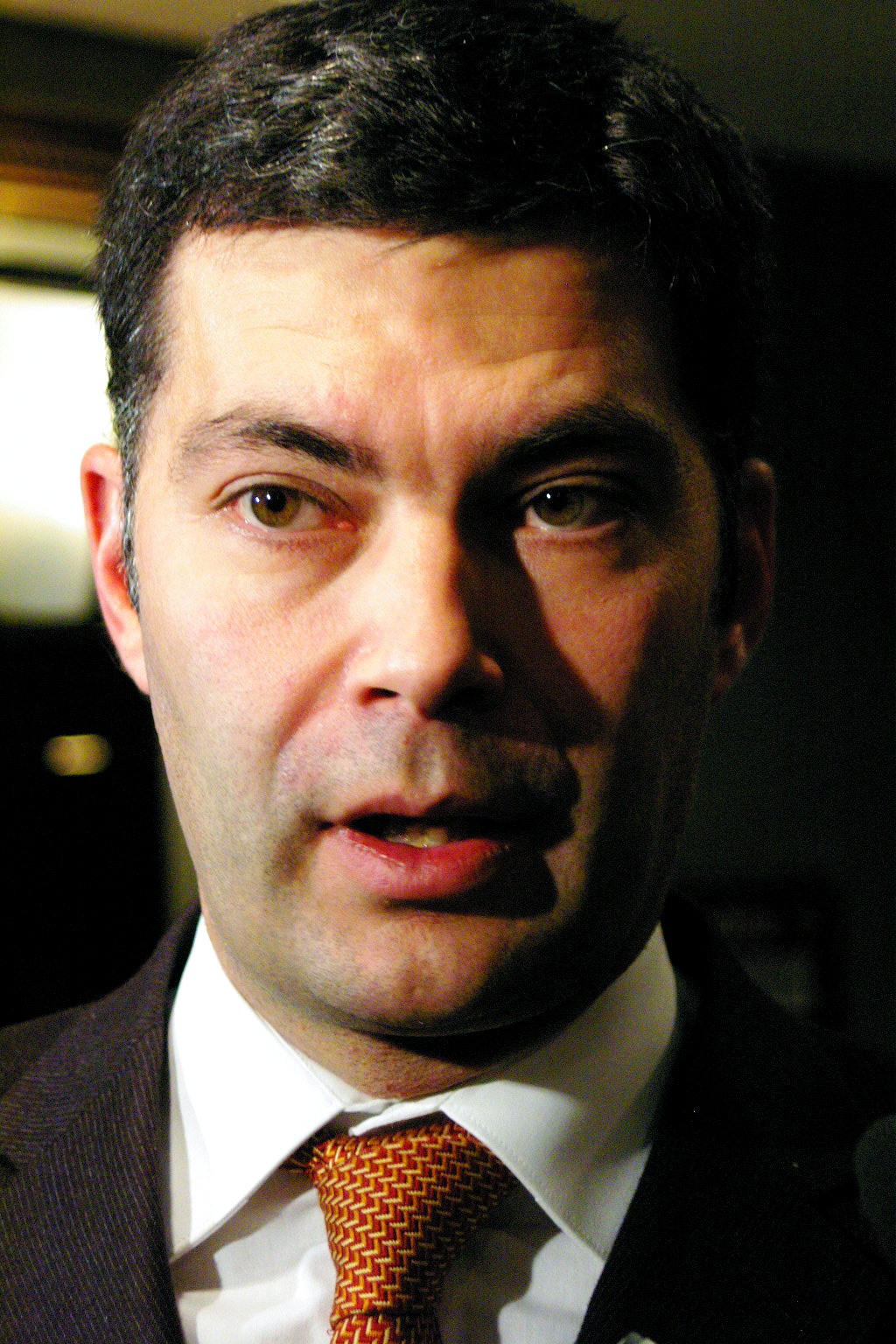
	First party	Second party	Third party
Leader	Jacques Parizeau	Daniel Johnson Jr.	Mario Dumont
Party	Parti Québécois	Liberal	Action démocratique
Leader since	March 18, 1988	December 14, 1993	May 11, 1994
Leader's seat	L'Assomption	Vaudreuil	Rivière-du-Loup
Last election	29 seats, 40.16%	92 seats, 49.95%	pre-creation
Seats won	77	47	1
Seat change	▲48	▼45	▲1
Popular vote	1,751,442	1,737,698	252,721
Percentage	44.75%	44.40%	6.46%
Swing	▲4.59%	▼5.55%	▲6.46%
- Popular vote by riding. As this is an FPTP election, seat totals are not determined by popular vote, but instead via results by each riding. Click the map for more details.
Premier before election
Daniel Johnson Jr.
Liberal
Premier after election
Jacques Parizeau
Parti Québécois

The 1994 Quebec general election was held on September 12, 1994, to elect members to the National Assembly of Quebec in the province of Quebec, Canada. The Parti Québécois, led by hard soverignist Jacques Parizeau, defeated the incumbent Quebec Liberal Party, led by Premier Daniel Johnson Jr.

Johnson had succeeded Robert Bourassa as Liberal leader and Premier. Both his father, Daniel Sr., and brother, Pierre-Marc, had previously served as premiers of Quebec as leaders of different parties.

The election set the stage for the 1995 Quebec referendum on independence for Quebec from Canada. The referendum would see the PQ government's proposals for sovereignty very narrowly defeated.

Mario Dumont, a former president of the Liberal party's youth wing, and then leader of the newly formed Action démocratique du Québec, won his own seat, but no other members of his party were elected.

In Saint-Jean, there was a tie between incumbent Liberal candidate Michel Charbonneau and PQ candidate Roger Paquin. A new election was held on October 24 and was won by Paquin by a margin of 532 votes.

== 1992 redistribution of ridings ==
The Commission de la représentation électorale performed a redistribution in 1992, which maintained the number of seats in the National Assembly at 125 for the next general election, making the following alterations:

Abolished ridings	New ridings
Drawn from parts of other ridings
	Bertrand (Note: drawn from parts of Labelle, Prévost and Rousseau)
	Blainville (Note: drawn from parts of Groulx and Terrebonne)
	Borduas (Note: drawn from parts of Verchères and Iberville)
Merger of ridings
Dorion; Laurier	Laurier-Dorion
Sainte-Anne; Saint-Henri	Saint-Henri–Sainte-Anne
Saint-Louis; Westmount	Westmount–Saint-Louis
Renaming of ridings
Bertrand	Marguerite-D'Youville
Les Chutes-de-la-Chaudière	Chutes-de-la-Chaudière

== Candidates ==
=== Party for the Commonwealth of Canada ===
The Party for the Commonwealth of Canada (also known as the Party for the Republic of Canada) fielded eighteen candidates, none of whom were elected.

==== Mercier ====
Julie Laliberté received 173 votes (0.56%), finishing seventh against Parti Québécois candidate Robert Perreault.

==== Rosemont ====
Normand Bélanger ran for the Commonwealth Party in two federal and two provincial elections. In addition to supporting Lyndon LaRouche's theories, he also called for classical music to be taught starting at the primary grades in the Quebec public school system.

Electoral record
Election	Division	Party	Votes	%	Place	Winner
1988 federal	Papineau	Commonwealth	174	0.44	9/9	André Ouellet, Liberal
1989 provincial	Rosemont	Commonwealth	134	0.48	7/10	Guy Rivard, Liberal
1993 federal	Saint-Henri—Westmount	Commonwealth	131	0.31	8/12	David Berger, Liberal
1994 provincial	Rosemont	Commonwealth	149	0.50	6/6	Rita Dionne-Marsolais, Parti Québécois

== Results ==
Elections to the National Assembly of Quebec (1994)
Political party	Party leader	MNAs				Votes			
Political party	Party leader	Candidates	1989	1994	±	#	±	%	± (pp)
Parti Québécois	Jacques Parizeau	125	29	77	48▲	1,751,442	382,375▲	44.75%	4.59▲
Liberal	Daniel Johnson Jr.	125	92	47	45▼	1,737,698	34,890▲	44.40%	5.55▼
Action démocratique	Mario Dumont	80	–	1	1▲	252,721	252,721▲	6.46%	New
Equality (Note: Results of Unity Party included in 1989 for comparative purposes.)	Keith Henderson	17	4	–	4▼	11,526	148,062▼	0.29%	4.39▼
Independent		68	–	–	–	66,221	42,470▲	1.69%	0.99▲
New Democratic	Jean-François Sirois	41	–	–	–	33,269	8,235▼	0.85%	0.37▼
Natural Law	Allen Faguy	102	–	–	–	33,206	33,206▲	0.85%	New
Parti de la souveraineté du Québec		19	–	–	–	5,566	5,566	0.14%	New
Green		11	–	–	–	5,499	62,176▼	0.14%	1.85▼
Lemon		10	–	–	–	4,087	3,463▼	0.10%	0.12▼
CANADA!	Tony Kondaks	10	–	–	–	2,567	2,567▲	0.07%	New
Republic of Canada		18	–	–	–	2,258	459▲	0.06%	0.01▲
Développement Québec		11	–	–	–	1,876	1,876▲	0.05%	New
Parti innovateur du Québec		11	–	–	–	1,861	1,861▲	0.05%	New
Parti économique du Québec		9	–	–	–	1,759	1,759▲	0.04%	New
Marxist–Leninist		13	–	–	–	1,171	3,074▼	0.03%	0.09▼
Communist		10	–	–	–	1,062	254▲	0.03%	0.01▲
Total		680	125	125		3,913,789		100.00%	
Rejected ballots						78,239	13,920▼		
Voter turnout						3,992,028	490,960▲	81.58	5.89▲
Registered electors						4,893,465	202,775▲		

=== Vote and seat summaries ===
Ternary plots - shift of electoral support (1989-1994)
1989

1994
Electoral districts identified by colours of winning parties

Seats and popular vote by party
Party	Seats	Votes	Change (pp)
█ Parti Québécois	77 / 125	44.75%	4.79
█ Liberal	47 / 125	44.40%	-5.55
█ Action démocratique	1 / 125	6.46%	6.46
█ New Democratic	0 / 125	0.85%	-0.37
█ Equality	0 / 125	0.29%	-4.39
█ Green	0 / 125	0.14%	-1.85
█ Independent	0 / 125	1.69%	0.99
█ Other	0 / 125	1.42%	-0.08

=== Synopsis of results ===
Results by riding - 1994 Quebec general election
Riding	Winning party						Turnout (Note: including spoilt ballots)	Votes							
Name	1989	Party	Votes	Share	Margin #	Margin %	Turnout	PQ	Lib	ADQ	NDP	NLP	Ind	Oth	Total
Abitibi-Est	Lib	PQ	12,314	54.50%	3,917	17.33%	75.70%	12,314	8,397	1,885	–	–	–	–	22,596
Abitibi-Ouest	PQ	PQ	17,391	74.37%	11,398	48.74%	73.83%	17,391	5,993	–	–	–	–	–	23,384
Acadie	Lib	Lib	24,796	73.71%	18,060	53.68%	84.33%	6,736	24,796	1,591	–	268	–	251	33,642
Anjou	Lib	PQ	12,453	46.60%	756	2.83%	85.53%	12,453	11,697	1,753	537	188	–	98	26,726
Argenteuil	Lib	Lib	15,272	42.59%	1,802	5.03%	81.75%	13,470	15,272	6,622	–	224	–	270	35,858
Arthabaska	PQ	PQ	20,577	61.55%	9,126	27.30%	81.23%	20,577	11,451	–	–	369	905	130	33,432
Beauce-Nord	Lib	Lib	10,752	45.81%	61	0.26%	78.16%	10,691	10,752	–	1,434	592	–	–	23,469
Beauce-Sud	Lib	Lib	13,122	45.18%	164	0.56%	75.85%	12,958	13,122	–	856	–	1,543	567	29,046
Beauharnois-Huntingdon	Lib	Lib	16,355	51.76%	3,042	9.63%	82.43%	13,313	16,355	–	–	242	1,085	603	31,598
Bellechasse	Lib	PQ	10,570	46.58%	2,312	10.19%	78.10%	10,570	8,258	3,865	–	–	–	–	22,693
Berthier	Lib	PQ	19,206	53.66%	6,216	17.37%	82.02%	19,206	12,990	2,984	–	253	–	356	35,789
Bertrand	New	Lib	14,558	45.61%	146	0.46%	83.37%	14,412	14,558	2,486	–	238	221	–	31,915
Blainville	New	PQ	15,273	51.40%	5,813	19.56%	83.38%	15,273	9,460	4,188	–	322	–	470	29,713
Bonaventure	Lib	PQ	12,411	52.54%	2,306	9.76%	80.37%	12,411	10,105	925	–	180	–	–	23,621
Borduas	New	PQ	15,461	55.84%	4,810	17.37%	86.00%	15,461	10,651	–	–	–	1,037	537	27,686
Bourassa	Lib	Lib	12,963	49.91%	2,540	9.78%	83.29%	10,423	12,963	2,210	–	246	–	132	25,974
Bourget	Lib	PQ	12,669	45.41%	982	3.52%	84.45%	12,669	11,687	3,176	–	273	–	96	27,901
Brome-Missisquoi	Lib	Lib	18,402	61.12%	9,430	31.32%	84.07%	8,972	18,402	2,037	–	274	–	423	30,108
Chambly	Lib	PQ	19,800	48.86%	407	1.00%	87.47%	19,800	19,393	–	–	519	–	810	40,522
Champlain	Lib	PQ	14,929	42.26%	3,986	11.28%	83.64%	14,929	10,943	8,953	–	274	–	229	35,328
Chapleau	Lib	Lib	25,181	63.29%	12,618	31.71%	74.63%	12,563	25,181	–	984	222	219	618	39,787
Charlesbourg	Lib	PQ	17,908	47.01%	7,495	19.68%	84.72%	17,908	10,413	6,022	811	375	2,561	–	38,090
Charlevoix	Lib	PQ	12,091	52.59%	3,105	13.50%	76.34%	12,091	8,986	–	–	–	1,915	–	22,992
Châteauguay	Lib	Lib	17,426	51.29%	1,922	5.66%	87.02%	15,504	17,426	–	–	623	–	424	33,977
Chauveau	Lib	PQ	20,106	46.54%	6,319	14.63%	81.15%	20,106	13,787	5,427	–	596	3,281	–	43,197
Chicoutimi	PQ	PQ	22,025	63.55%	13,004	37.52%	78.27%	22,025	9,021	2,619	706	285	–	–	34,656
Chomedey	Lib	Lib	25,885	67.70%	16,646	43.54%	82.18%	9,239	25,885	1,997	–	150	–	962	38,233
Chutes-de-la-Chaudière	PQ	PQ	21,091	51.80%	11,871	29.16%	82.88%	21,091	9,220	7,263	834	279	2,027	–	40,714
Crémazie	Lib	PQ	14,482	46.79%	429	1.39%	86.02%	14,482	14,053	1,703	337	193	–	180	30,948
D'Arcy-McGee	Eq	Lib	21,325	65.37%	11,269	34.54%	84.46%	1,084	21,325	–	–	157	10,056	–	32,622
Deux-Montagnes	Lib	PQ	20,742	48.34%	5,689	13.26%	83.28%	20,742	15,053	6,523	–	286	–	305	42,909
Drummond	Lib	PQ	16,625	46.54%	4,766	13.34%	80.42%	16,625	11,859	3,585	–	296	3,355	–	35,720
Dubuc	PQ	PQ	16,759	63.50%	9,617	36.44%	77.74%	16,759	7,142	2,162	–	328	–	–	26,391
Duplessis	PQ	PQ	15,788	60.00%	5,263	20.00%	73.51%	15,788	10,525	–	–	–	–	–	26,313
Fabre	Lib	PQ	17,679	44.30%	1,109	2.78%	86.55%	17,679	16,570	5,043	–	259	–	359	39,910
Frontenac	Lib	Lib	14,916	52.69%	2,336	8.25%	84.02%	12,580	14,916	–	–	813	–	–	28,309
Gaspé	Lib	PQ	11,410	53.39%	3,377	15.80%	73.51%	11,410	8,033	1,774	–	156	–	–	21,373
Gatineau	Lib	Lib	19,046	65.05%	9,683	33.07%	77.96%	9,363	19,046	–	–	259	–	609	29,277
Gouin	PQ	PQ	17,305	56.42%	6,361	20.74%	80.04%	17,305	10,944	–	1,428	263	458	274	30,672
Groulx	Lib	PQ	15,027	46.11%	2,637	8.09%	83.08%	15,027	12,390	4,328	–	185	152	508	32,590
Hochelaga-Maisonneuve	PQ	PQ	14,858	64.78%	8,819	38.45%	75.54%	14,858	6,039	1,249	392	190	–	209	22,937
Hull	Lib	Lib	19,184	56.56%	5,237	15.44%	78.33%	13,947	19,184	–	–	231	–	554	33,916
Iberville	Lib	PQ	15,604	43.41%	1,464	4.07%	82.96%	15,604	14,140	4,122	645	–	1,004	428	35,943
Îles-de-la-Madeleine	Lib	Lib	5,455	59.98%	1,816	19.97%	86.41%	3,639	5,455	–	–	–	–	–	9,094
Jacques-Cartier	Eq	Lib	32,839	83.65%	29,398	74.89%	88.12%	3,441	32,839	–	–	206	–	2,771 (Note: The incumbent Neil Cameron (Equality Party) received 2,415 votes)	39,257
Jeanne-Mance	Lib	Lib	21,294	74.22%	14,760	51.45%	81.52%	6,534	21,294	–	–	322	–	540	28,690
Jean-Talon	Lib	Lib	12,229	43.90%	25	0.09%	88.95%	12,204	12,229	2,082	313	130	816	83	27,857
Johnson	PQ	PQ	13,247	49.78%	1,246	4.68%	81.13%	13,247	12,001	–	–	630	–	732	26,610
Joliette	PQ	PQ	21,903	64.71%	13,191	38.97%	83.84%	21,903	8,712	2,651	–	581	–	–	33,847
Jonquière	PQ	PQ	22,598	69.43%	13,895	42.69%	80.03%	22,598	8,703	–	–	1,248	–	–	32,549
Kamouraska-Témiscouata	Lib	Lib	10,373	42.69%	386	1.59%	73.30%	9,987	10,373	3,223	717	–	–	–	24,300
Labelle	PQ	PQ	17,638	65.78%	9,144	34.10%	78.27%	17,638	8,494	–	–	340	–	342	26,814
Lac-Saint-Jean	PQ	PQ	20,743	71.67%	13,474	46.55%	78.58%	20,743	7,269	–	–	931	–	–	28,943
LaFontaine	Lib	Lib	20,698	55.67%	7,836	21.08%	82.87%	12,862	20,698	2,971	–	316	–	334	37,181
La Peltrie	Lib	PQ	20,475	49.27%	8,569	20.62%	85.51%	20,475	11,906	6,003	–	475	2,701	–	41,560
La Pinière	Lib	Lib	22,252	62.68%	10,057	28.33%	85.84%	12,195	22,252	–	–	597	–	457	35,501
Laporte	Lib	Lib	21,162	57.79%	7,094	19.37%	85.17%	14,068	21,162	–	–	382	–	1,006	36,618
La Prairie	PQ	PQ	23,164	55.35%	8,444	20.18%	85.22%	23,164	14,720	3,103	–	371	–	493	41,851
L'Assomption	PQ	PQ	21,809	56.04%	10,992	28.24%	85.60%	21,809	10,817	5,925	–	366	–	–	38,917
Laurier-Dorion	New	Lib	18,522	55.53%	6,930	20.78%	81.65%	11,592	18,522	1,723	409	274	–	832	33,352
Laval-des-Rapides	Lib	PQ	14,179	46.85%	1,733	5.73%	82.68%	14,179	12,446	2,738	669	232	–	–	30,264
Laviolette	PQ	PQ	16,670	63.54%	9,212	35.11%	78.66%	16,670	7,458	1,880	–	226	–	–	26,234
Lévis	PQ	PQ	20,998	72.26%	12,937	44.52%	82.11%	20,998	8,061	–	–	–	–	–	29,059
Limoilou	Lib	PQ	15,092	44.42%	4,484	13.20%	79.16%	15,092	10,608	4,066	938	–	2,738	537	33,979
Lotbinière	Lib	PQ	10,398	45.56%	283	1.24%	80.88%	10,398	10,115	–	–	–	2,308	–	22,821
Louis-Hébert	Lib	PQ	12,905	39.37%	3,441	10.50%	85.86%	12,905	7,833	1,868	415	124	9,633 (Note: André Arthur came in second, with 9,464 votes)	–	32,778
Marguerite-Bourgeoys	Lib	Lib	24,046	70.34%	16,196	47.38%	86.07%	7,850	24,046	1,200	392	226	–	472	34,186
Marguerite-D'Youville	PQ	PQ	19,995	58.02%	6,906	20.04%	87.16%	19,995	13,089	–	–	554	–	822	34,460
Marie-Victorin	PQ	PQ	17,611	56.19%	7,390	23.58%	80.34%	17,611	10,221	2,749	–	376	383	–	31,340
Marquette	Lib	Lib	16,774	55.06%	5,728	18.80%	83.57%	11,046	16,774	1,449	–	164	573	460	30,466
Maskinongé	Lib	PQ	16,047	47.56%	2,919	8.65%	81.72%	16,047	13,128	4,261	–	307	–	–	33,743
Masson	PQ	PQ	21,481	64.19%	14,490	43.30%	82.71%	21,481	6,991	4,388	–	255	351	–	33,466
Matane	Lib	PQ	11,625	54.60%	4,230	19.87%	76.95%	11,625	7,395	2,270	–	–	–	–	21,290
Matapédia	Lib	PQ	12,826	58.48%	3,719	16.96%	76.20%	12,826	9,107	–	–	–	–	–	21,933
Mégantic-Compton	Lib	Lib	12,799	53.95%	2,748	11.58%	81.03%	10,051	12,799	–	–	444	–	431	23,725
Mercier	PQ	PQ	17,523	56.48%	8,044	25.93%	80.33%	17,523	9,479	1,681	815	259	–	1,269	31,026
Mille-Îles	Lib	PQ	17,337	45.68%	1,371	3.61%	86.87%	17,337	15,966	4,182	–	295	–	177	37,957
Montmagny-L'Islet	Lib	Lib	10,339	44.36%	855	3.67%	75.02%	9,484	10,339	–	881	–	2,605	–	23,309
Montmorency	Lib	PQ	22,734	55.74%	13,068	32.04%	80.74%	22,734	9,666	–	2,875	534	4,827	150	40,786
Mont-Royal	Lib	Lib	22,827	80.41%	19,100	67.28%	80.07%	3,727	22,827	605	143	144	–	943	28,389
Nelligan	Lib	Lib	33,804	77.16%	25,794	58.88%	86.24%	8,010	33,804	–	–	276	–	1,721	43,811
Nicolet-Yamaska	Lib	PQ	13,427	50.13%	907	3.39%	84.85%	13,427	12,520	–	–	840	–	–	26,787
Notre-Dame-de-Grâce	Eq	Lib	21,716	73.08%	17,961	60.44%	83.19%	3,755	21,716	–	406	112	1,752 (Note: The incumbent Gordon Atkinson (formerly of the Equality Party) received 1,628 votes)	1,975	29,716
Orford	Lib	Lib	19,082	51.07%	3,787	10.13%	82.79%	15,295	19,082	2,454	–	293	–	242	37,366
Outremont	Lib	Lib	19,346	62.11%	9,528	30.59%	82.11%	9,818	19,346	1,049	453	263	–	220	31,149
Papineau	Lib	Lib	15,084	53.67%	3,381	12.03%	80.97%	11,703	15,084	836	–	178	–	303	28,104
Pointe-aux-Trembles	PQ	PQ	15,999	53.77%	6,034	20.28%	82.46%	15,999	9,965	3,466	–	324	–	–	29,754
Pontiac	Lib	Lib	23,066	80.18%	18,883	65.64%	80.90%	4,183	23,066	–	–	131	–	1,387	28,767
Portneuf	Lib	PQ	14,256	47.88%	3,776	12.68%	79.80%	14,256	10,480	4,501	–	537	–	–	29,774
Prévost	Lib	PQ	17,425	50.52%	4,110	11.92%	81.31%	17,425	13,315	2,499	1,033	219	–	–	34,491
Richelieu	Lib	PQ	17,186	55.09%	4,745	15.21%	83.23%	17,186	12,441	–	–	–	1,570	–	31,197
Richmond	Lib	Lib	14,106	54.28%	4,061	15.63%	84.11%	10,045	14,106	1,486	–	197	–	154	25,988
Rimouski	Lib	PQ	14,926	51.45%	2,627	9.06%	78.33%	14,926	12,299	–	1,556	227	–	–	29,008
Rivière-du-Loup	Lib	ADQ	13,307	54.77%	6,699	27.57%	83.65%	6,608	4,226	13,307	–	55	99	–	24,295
Robert-Baldwin	Lib	Lib	29,865	82.98%	26,324	73.14%	85.17%	3,541	29,865	909	–	123	–	1,552	35,990
Roberval	Lib	PQ	18,281	60.08%	7,055	23.18%	75.15%	18,281	11,226	–	–	923	–	–	30,430
Rosemont	Lib	PQ	14,736	49.25%	2,500	8.36%	83.71%	14,736	12,236	1,946	626	226	–	149	29,919
Rousseau	Lib	PQ	16,532	53.86%	6,699	21.82%	77.66%	16,532	9,833	3,595	631	–	–	106	30,697
Rouyn-Noranda–Témiscamingue	PQ	PQ	18,160	58.62%	7,372	23.80%	77.75%	18,160	10,788	2,030	–	–	–	–	30,978
Saguenay	Lib	PQ	14,439	57.44%	7,004	27.86%	72.47%	14,439	7,435	3,264	–	–	–	–	25,138
Sainte-Marie–Saint-Jacques	PQ	PQ	16,723	54.73%	6,662	21.80%	75.07%	16,723	10,061	1,691	621	246	647	567	30,556
Saint-François	Lib	Lib	15,861	49.48%	2,616	8.16%	82.20%	13,245	15,861	2,422	–	294	–	236	32,058
Saint-Henri-Sainte-Anne	New	Lib	14,940	47.96%	641	2.06%	81.21%	14,299	14,940	998	344	112	–	457	31,150
Saint-Hyacinthe	Lib	PQ	15,988	44.94%	1,092	3.07%	82.53%	15,988	14,896	3,398	1,292	–	–	–	35,574
Saint-Jean (Note: Results for byelection held on October 24, 1994. Initial vote ended in a tie, which was declared void.)	Lib	PQ	15,680	43.79%	532	1.49%	76.53%	15,680	15,148	4,693	204	–	–	82	35,807
Saint-Laurent	Lib	Lib	25,711	76.73%	20,109	60.01%	81.83%	5,602	25,711	1,061	–	154	72	907	33,507
Saint-Maurice	Lib	PQ	13,202	47.38%	2,137	7.67%	84.25%	13,202	11,065	3,106	–	238	254	–	27,865
Salaberry-Soulanges	Lib	PQ	19,448	48.28%	1,009	2.51%	85.37%	19,448	18,439	–	1,644	322	–	425	40,278
Sauvé	Lib	Lib	13,447	53.85%	4,183	16.75%	80.26%	9,264	13,447	1,562	453	129	43	72	24,970
Shefford	PQ	Lib	17,282	45.71%	1,323	3.50%	81.22%	15,959	17,282	4,028	–	360	–	177	37,806
Sherbrooke	Lib	PQ	14,733	47.31%	1,391	4.47%	82.27%	14,733	13,342	2,564	–	326	–	176	31,141
Taillon	PQ	PQ	23,315	60.99%	9,994	26.14%	81.79%	23,315	13,321	–	–	844	–	746	38,226
Taschereau	Lib	PQ	12,308	51.86%	5,783	24.37%	78.78%	12,308	6,525	2,041	705	332	1,741	80	23,732
Terrebonne	PQ	PQ	19,671	60.39%	11,444	35.13%	83.20%	19,671	8,227	4,389	–	285	–	–	32,572
Trois-Rivières	Lib	PQ	12,607	43.24%	609	2.09%	81.94%	12,607	11,998	4,267	–	281	–	–	29,153
Ungava	PQ	PQ	7,276	54.19%	1,905	14.19%	51.81%	7,276	5,371	–	–	372	–	407	13,426
Vachon	Lib	PQ	15,685	48.86%	3,531	11.00%	84.38%	15,685	12,154	3,536	–	300	–	424	32,099
Vanier	Lib	PQ	18,257	49.50%	8,799	23.85%	80.39%	18,257	9,458	4,906	1,054	–	3,008	203	36,886
Vaudreuil	Lib	Lib	24,849	59.50%	9,107	21.81%	87.19%	15,742	24,849	–	–	324	–	846	41,761
Verchères	PQ	PQ	16,308	57.77%	8,131	28.81%	83.11%	16,308	8,177	3,356	–	386	–	–	28,227
Verdun	Lib	Lib	18,392	54.57%	6,429	19.07%	81.89%	11,963 (Note: Richard Holden was previously elected under the Equality Party banner in Westmount, before becoming a péquiste in 1992.)	18,392	2,327	368	167	–	489	33,706
Viau	Lib	Lib	17,946	63.19%	9,483	33.39%	79.73%	8,463	17,946	–	1,482	291	–	218	28,400
Viger	Lib	Lib	18,743	64.27%	10,214	35.02%	84.12%	8,529	18,743	–	1,485	223	–	185	29,165
Vimont	Lib	PQ	18,985	44.88%	128	0.30%	86.44%	18,985	18,857	2,783	1,142	279	257	–	42,303
Westmount-Saint-Louis	New	Lib	26,478	79.20%	22,100	66.10%	77.87%	4,378	26,478	741	239	100	24	1,473	33,433

= open seat
= turnout is above provincial average
= winning candidate was in previous Legislature
= incumbent had switched allegiance
= previously incumbent in another riding
= not incumbent; was previously elected to the Legislature
= incumbency arose from byelection gain
= other incumbents renominated
= previously an MP in the House of Commons of Canada
= multiple candidates

=== Comparative analysis for ridings (1994 vs 1989) ===
Summary of riding results by turnout and vote share for winning candidate (vs 1989)
Riding and winning party			Turnout		Vote share	
Riding and winning party			%	Change (pp)	%	Change (pp)
Abitibi-Est	PQ	Gain	75.70	2.23	54.50	10.17
Abitibi-Ouest	PQ	Hold	73.83	0.86	74.37	6.98
Acadie	PLQ	Hold	84.33	9.68	73.71	8.09
Anjou	PQ	Gain	85.53	8.26	46.60	3.42
Argenteuil	PLQ	Hold	81.75	8.32	42.59	-9.32
Arthabaska	PQ	Hold	81.23	-0.40	61.55	10.07
Beauce-Nord	PLQ	Hold	78.16	2.22	45.81	-15.31
Beauce-Sud	PLQ	Hold	75.85	2.61	45.18	-24.60
Beauharnois-Huntingdon	PLQ	Hold	82.43	6.20	51.76	3.53
Bellechasse	PQ	Gain	78.10	1.67	46.58	-2.99
Berthier	PQ	Gain	82.02	5.70	53.66	15.29
Bertrand	PLQ	New	83.37	New	45.61	New
Blainville	PQ	New	83.38	New	51.40	New
Bonaventure	PQ	Gain	80.37	6.43	52.54	25.23
Borduas	PQ	New	86.00	New	55.84	New
Bourassa	PLQ	Hold	83.29	9.79	49.91	-6.62
Bourget	PQ	Gain	84.45	7.68	45.41	-1.48
Brome-Missisquoi	PLQ	Hold	84.07	8.36	61.12	6.94
Chambly	PQ	Gain	87.47	7.12	48.86	8.10
Champlain	PQ	Gain	83.64	5.77	42.26	7.12
Chapleau	PLQ	Hold	74.63	10.83	63.29	8.05
Charlesbourg	PQ	Gain	84.72	4.51	47.01	15.10
Charlevoix	PQ	Gain	76.34	2.52	52.59	6.72
Châteauguay	PLQ	Hold	87.02	8.08	51.29	7.65
Chauveau	PQ	Gain	81.15	7.10	46.54	8.67
Chicoutimi	PQ	Hold	78.27	2.79	63.55	7.74
Chomedey	PLQ	Hold	82.18	9.62	67.70	14.31
Chutes-de-la-Chaudière	PQ	Hold	82.88	4.03	51.80	2.87
Crémazie	PQ	Gain	86.02	6.96	46.79	4.45
D'Arcy-McGee	PLQ	Gain	84.46	8.11	65.37	29.82
Deux-Montagnes	PQ	Gain	83.28	7.33	48.34	3.39
Drummond	PQ	Gain	80.42	3.21	46.54	6.33
Dubuc	PQ	Hold	77.74	4.71	63.50	8.59
Duplessis	PQ	Hold	73.51	1.81	60.00	10.14
Fabre	PQ	Gain	86.55	7.28	44.30	0.80
Frontenac	PLQ	Hold	84.02	3.12	52.69	-11.07
Gaspé	PQ	Gain	73.51	2.13	53.39	11.14
Gatineau	PLQ	Hold	77.96	12.42	65.05	9.06
Gouin	PQ	Hold	80.04	6.66	56.42	5.39
Groulx	PQ	Gain	83.08	8.09	46.11	1.67
Hochelaga-Maisonneuve	PQ	Hold	75.54	6.98	64.78	1.27
Hull	PLQ	Hold	78.33	16.16	56.56	1.31
Iberville	PQ	Gain	82.96	6.56	43.41	2.31
Îles-de-la-Madeleine	PLQ	Hold	86.41	2.64	59.98	8.50
Jacques-Cartier	PLQ	Gain	88.12	8.29	83.65	42.13
Jeanne-Mance	PLQ	Hold	81.52	10.71	74.22	9.16
Jean-Talon	PLQ	Hold	88.95	5.08	43.90	-10.50
Johnson	PQ	Hold	81.13	2.65	49.78	0.56
Joliette	PQ	Hold	83.84	5.92	64.71	4.03
Jonquière	PQ	Hold	80.03	3.93	69.43	13.38
Kamouraska-Témiscouata	PLQ	Hold	73.30	6.61	42.69	-12.98
La Peltrie	PQ	Gain	85.51	5.39	49.27	7.96
Labelle	PQ	Hold	78.27	4.28	65.78	10.98
Lac-Saint-Jean	PQ	Hold	78.58	1.03	71.67	16.62
LaFontaine	PLQ	Hold	82.87	12.14	55.67	-2.16
La Pinière	PLQ	Hold	85.84	9.56	62.68	4.52
Laporte	PLQ	Hold	85.17	6.46	57.79	18.21
La Prairie	PQ	Hold	85.22	7.92	55.35	8.06
L'Assomption	PQ	Hold	85.60	5.36	56.04	0.52
Laurier-Dorion	PLQ	New	81.65	New	55.53	New
Laval-des-Rapides	PQ	Gain	82.68	7.05	46.85	2.98
Laviolette	PQ	Hold	78.66	2.90	63.54	-2.64
Lévis	PQ	Hold	82.11	3.21	72.26	5.59
Limoilou	PQ	Gain	79.16	4.74	44.42	9.73
Lotbinière	PQ	Gain	80.88	2.65	45.56	10.82
Louis-Hébert	PQ	Gain	85.86	5.29	39.37	-5.45
Marguerite-Bourgeoys	PLQ	Hold	86.07	10.97	70.34	20.46
Marguerite-D'Youville	PQ	Hold	87.16	5.57	58.02	4.27
Marie-Victorin	PQ	Hold	80.34	5.49	56.19	2.51
Marquette	PLQ	Hold	83.57	9.00	55.06	6.18
Maskinongé	PQ	Gain	81.72	5.15	47.56	11.19
Masson	PQ	Hold	82.71	8.95	64.19	4.76
Matane	PQ	Gain	76.95	4.70	54.60	12.12
Matapédia	PQ	Gain	76.20	3.01	58.48	18.62
Mégantic-Compton	PLQ	Hold	81.03	4.34	53.95	-6.44
Mercier	PQ	Hold	80.33	8.53	56.48	-0.67
Mille-Îles	PQ	Gain	86.87	7.50	45.68	2.34
Montmagny-L'Islet	PLQ	Hold	75.02	3.81	44.36	-13.40
Montmorency	PQ	Gain	80.74	5.20	55.74	23.00
Mont-Royal	PLQ	Hold	80.07	9.71	80.41	26.83
Nelligan	PLQ	Hold	86.24	11.81	77.16	30.13
Nicolet-Yamaska	PQ	Gain	84.85	3.87	50.13	14.67
Notre-Dame-de-Grâce	PLQ	Gain	83.19	7.84	73.08	37.78
Orford	PLQ	Hold	82.79	8.61	51.07	-6.41
Outremont	PLQ	Hold	82.11	5.93	62.11	12.21
Papineau	PLQ	Hold	80.97	8.66	53.67	3.00
Pointe-aux-Trembles	PQ	Hold	82.46	7.90	53.77	3.36
Pontiac	PLQ	Hold	80.90	16.89	80.18	33.62
Portneuf	PQ	Gain	79.80	1.63	47.88	18.59
Prévost	PQ	Gain	81.31	6.21	50.52	5.88
Richelieu	PQ	Gain	83.23	3.47	55.09	12.84
Richmond	PLQ	Hold	84.11	4.35	54.28	-14.49
Rimouski	PQ	Gain	78.33	5.40	51.45	7.74
Rivière-du-Loup	ADQ	Gain	83.65	9.09	54.77	Did not campaign in 1989
Robert-Baldwin	PLQ	Hold	85.17	10.54	82.98	36.93
Roberval	PQ	Gain	75.15	3.24	60.08	15.71
Rosemont	PQ	Gain	83.71	8.14	49.25	2.76
Rousseau	PQ	Gain	77.66	6.10	53.86	14.10
Rouyn-Noranda–Témiscamingue	PQ	Hold	77.75	5.37	58.62	8.50
Saguenay	PQ	Gain	72.47	7.69	57.44	16.34
Saint-François	PLQ	Hold	82.20	7.28	49.48	-2.50
Saint-Henri-Sainte-Anne	PLQ	New	81.21	New	47.96	New
Saint-Hyacinthe	PQ	Gain	82.53	4.80	44.94	2.19
Saint-Jean	PQ	Gain	76.53	-1.58	43.79	4.50
Saint-Laurent	PLQ	Hold	81.83	7.77	76.73	24.60
Saint-Maurice	PQ	Gain	84.25	7.64	47.38	5.84
Sainte-Marie–Saint-Jacques	PQ	Hold	75.07	4.82	54.73	-0.56
Salaberry-Soulanges	PQ	Gain	85.37	6.25	48.28	5.33
Sauvé	PLQ	Hold	80.26	9.29	53.85	-4.59
Shefford	PLQ	Gain	81.22	1.70	45.71	5.70
Sherbrooke	PQ	Gain	82.27	5.96	47.31	7.58
Taillon	PQ	Hold	81.79	6.96	60.99	5.08
Taschereau	PQ	Gain	78.78	4.73	51.86	8.54
Terrebonne	PQ	Hold	83.20	7.36	60.39	8.36
Trois-Rivières	PQ	Gain	81.94	6.54	43.24	1.51
Ungava	PQ	Hold	51.81	0.13	54.19	3.23
Vachon	PQ	Gain	84.38	10.62	48.86	3.70
Vanier	PQ	Gain	80.39	6.29	49.50	11.00
Vaudreuil	PLQ	Hold	87.19	10.44	59.50	8.10
Verchères	PQ	Hold	83.11	4.13	57.77	10.01
Verdun	PLQ	Hold	81.89	6.68	54.57	15.99
Viau	PLQ	Hold	79.73	10.66	63.19	1.71
Viger	PLQ	Hold	84.12	7.91	64.27	3.54
Vimont	PQ	Gain	86.44	8.42	44.88	-2.00
Westmount-Saint-Louis	PLQ	New	77.87	New	79.20	New

=== Analysis ===
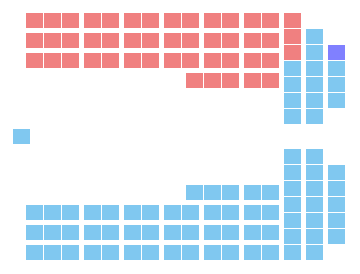
Seating arrangement in the 35th National Assembly

Party candidates in 2nd place
Party in 1st place	Party in 2nd place			Total
Party in 1st place	PQ	Lib	Ind	Total
Parti Québécois		76	1	77
Liberal	46		1	47
Action démocratique	1			1
Total	47	76	2	125

Candidates ranked 1st to 5th place, by party
Parties	1st	2nd	3rd	4th	5th
█ Parti Québécois	77	47	1		
█ Liberal	47	76	2		
█ Action démocratique	1		76	2	
█ Independent		2	9	14	8
█ Natural Law			10	42	6
█ New Democratic			8	22	9
█ Equality			5	8	4
█ Green			4	4	1
█ Lemon			3	4	2
█ Parti innovateur du Québec			1	1	4
█ Parti de la souveraineté du Québec				7	4
█ Développement Québec				2	1
█ CANADA!				1	6
█ Parti économique du Québec					6
█ Republic of Canada					5
█ Marxist–Leninist					1
█ Communist					1

Resulting composition of the 35th Quebec Legislative Assembly
Source		Party			
Source		PQ	Lib	ADQ	Total
Seats retained	Incumbents returned	24	27		51
Seats retained	Open seats held	4	12		16
Seats changing hands	Incumbents defeated	18	3		21
Seats changing hands	Open seats gained	24		1	25
Seats changing hands	Byelection gains held	5	1		6
New seats	New MNAs	2			2
New seats	Previously incumbent in another riding		4		4
Total		77	47	1	125

== See also ==
- Liste de sondages sur les élections générales québécoises de 1994 Opinion polling for the 1994 Quebec general election
- List of Quebec premiers
- Politics of Quebec
- Timeline of Quebec history
- 35th National Assembly of Quebec
