= Roch Cholette =

Canadian politician and accountant (born 1963)

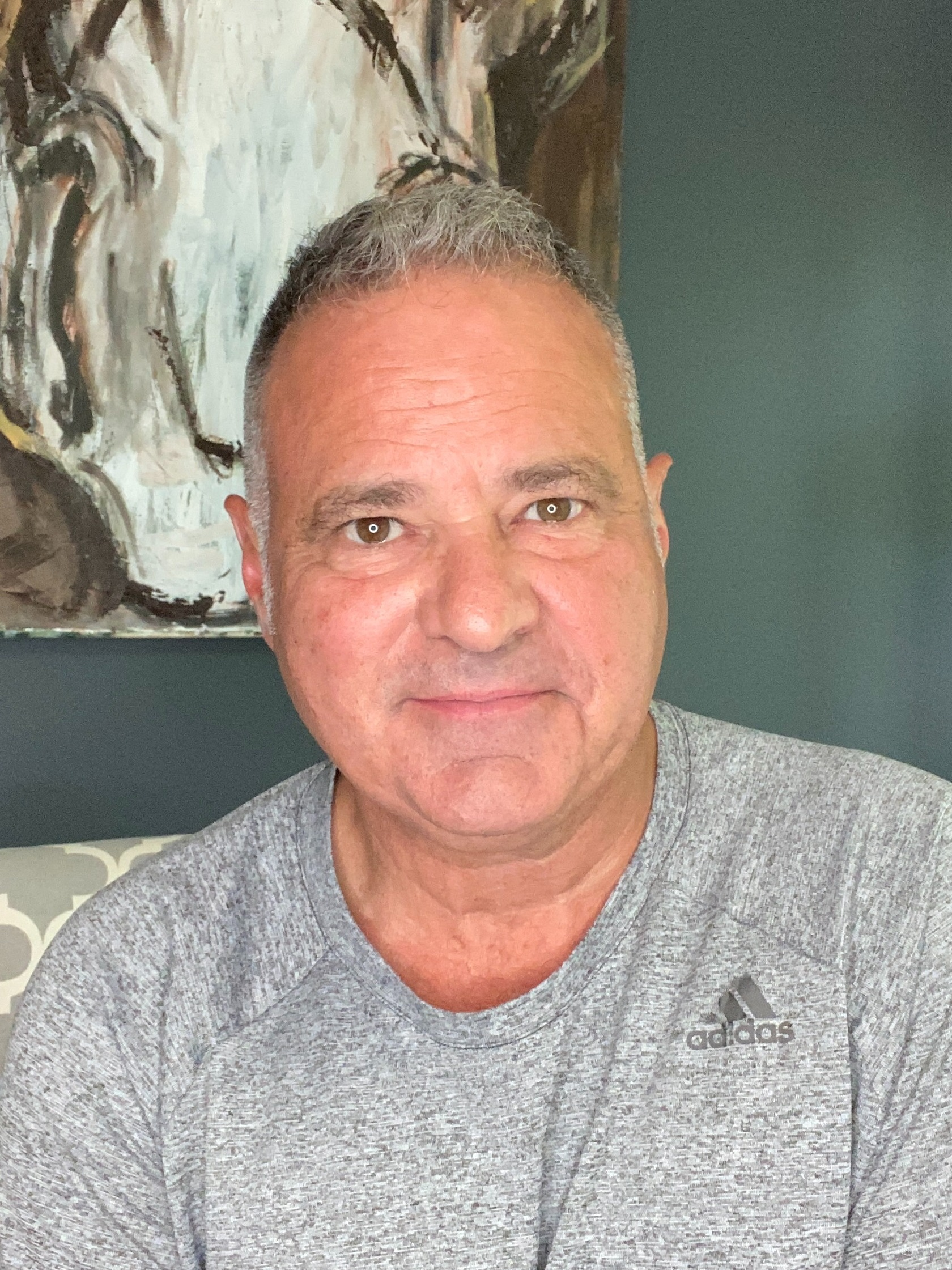
- Cholette in 2021

MNA for Hull
- In office November 30, 1998 – December 8, 2008
- Preceded by: Robert Lesage
- Succeeded by: Maryse Gaudreault

Personal details
- Born: May 16, 1963 (age 62) Lachine, Quebec, Canada
- Party: Quebec Liberal Party
- Profession: Accountant

Roch Cholette (born May 16, 1963 in Lachine, Quebec) is a Canadian public accountant and a former municipal and provincial politician in Quebec, Canada.

== Early life and education ==
Cholette studied at the Université du Québec en Outaouais (Université du Québec à Hull at that time) and completed a bachelor's degree in business administration in 1987.

He served as the Member of the National Assembly of Quebec (MNA) for the provincial riding of Hull from 1998 until 2008, as a member of the Quebec Liberal Party caucus.

He was a member of the Ordre des comptables generaux licenciés du Québec (Certified General Accountants of Quebec) for over 10 years and also worked at the Office of the Auditor-General of Canada.

== Political career ==
Cholette started his political career in 1992 when he was elected as a councillor for the former city of Hull. He remained at that position until the 1998 provincial election when he ran as a candidate in the riding of Hull. He was elected in 1998 and the opposition critic in immigration then in municipal affairs. During his first mandate, the Liberals were the opposition party and the Parti Québécois (PQ) under Lucien Bouchard and later Bernard Landry were in power. Cholette was the Liberal Party's municipal affairs critic and had heavily criticized the party's municipal reorganization project, known as Bill 170.

After being re-elected and the Liberals won a majority government in the 2003 election, Cholette remained a backbencher MNA, and was named the Parliamentary Secretary of Premier Jean Charest in 2005.

In the 2007 elections, Cholette defeated PQ candidate and well-known teacher Marcel Painchaud and social activist Bill Clennett from Québec Solidaire. However, Cholette's majority was reduced significantly during the 2007 election because of the strong performance of the Action démocratique du Québec's candidate Francois Lizotte and the Green Party's Melanie Perrault. He was later named the Parliamentary Secretary to the Minister of Finances and President of the Treasury Board, portfolios that are occupied by Monique Jérôme-Forget.

On April 9, 2008, Cholette announced his resignation as Hull MNA and was replaced by his constituency assistant Maryse Gaudreault in the resulting by-election.

Cholette has shown interest in running for mayor of the city of Gatineau in the 2009 municipal elections.

== Electoral record (partial) ==
2007 Quebec general election: Hull
Party	Candidate	Votes	%	±%
Liberal	Roch Cholette	12,643	42.53	
Parti Québécois	Marcel Painchaud	7,115	23.93	
Action démocratique	François Lizotte	5,071	17.06	
Green	Mélanie Perreault	2,476	8.33	–
Québec solidaire	Bill Clennett	2,358	7.93	
Marxist–Leninist	Gabriel Girard-Bernier	67	0.23	
Total valid votes		29,730	100.00	
Rejected and declined votes		237		
Turnout		29,967	61.26	
Electors on the lists		48,915		
