= Maryse Gaudreault =

Canadian politician

Member of the National Assembly of Quebec for Hull
- In office May 12, 2008 – August 28, 2022
- Preceded by: Roch Cholette
- Succeeded by: Suzanne Tremblay

Personal details
- Born: July 6, 1959 (age 66) Quebec City, Quebec
- Party: Quebec Liberal Party
- Profession: political councillor

Maryse Gaudreault (born July 6, 1959) is a Canadian politician, who was a member of the National Assembly of Quebec for the riding of Hull from 2008 to 2022.

Gaudreault was elected for the Quebec Liberal Party on May 12, 2008, in Hull during a by-election. She replaced former MNA Roch Cholette, with whom Gaudreault worked as a political assistant from 2000 until his resignation on April 9, 2008. Gaudreault also previously worked as director of the Hull's CHSLD Foundation as well as for organisations linked to women and sport development. She also holds a diploma in computer sciences from the Institut de data processing de Québec.

Gaudreault was elected with 45% of the vote defeating local doctor Gilles Aubé from the Parti Québécois and community activist Bill Clennett of Québec solidaire as well as Brian Gibb, the director of the Quebec Green Party.

She was named on June 3, 2008, the Parliamentary Assistant for the Minister of Culture, Communications and Status of Women, Christine St-Pierre.

Gaudreault retained the seat in the general election held a few months later and in the 2014 general election.

She was defeated by Suzanne Tremblay of the Coalition Avenir Québec in the 2022 Quebec general election.

== Electoral record ==
2022 Quebec general election: Hull
Party	Candidate	Votes	%	±%
Coalition Avenir Québec	Suzanne Tremblay	11,060	34.64	+8.20
Liberal	Maryse Gaudreault	8,276	25.92	-7.84
Québec solidaire	Mathieu Perron-Dufour	6,623	20.75	+2.25
Parti Québécois	Camille Pellerin-Forget	3,122	9.78	-3.82
Conservative	Lise Couture	2,189	6.86	+5.40
Green	Rachid Jemmah	655	2.05	-1.48
Total valid votes		31,925	98.84	
Total rejected ballots		375	1.16	-0.14
Turnout		32,300	57.94	+0.31
Electors on the lists		55,751		
Coalition Avenir Québec gain from Liberal		Swing		+8.02

2018 Quebec general election: Hull
Party	Candidate	Votes	%	±%
Liberal	Maryse Gaudreault	10,519	33.76	-21.41
Coalition Avenir Québec	Rachel Bourdon	8,238	26.44	+15.51
Québec solidaire	Benoit Renaud	5,764	18.50	+7.45
Parti Québécois	Marysa Nadeau	4,238	13.6 0	-8.24
Green	Patricia Pilon	1,099	3.53	
New Democratic	Nichola St-Jean	721	2.31	
Conservative	Jean-Philippe Chaussé	454	1.46	
Citoyens au pouvoir	Marco Jetté	69	0.22	
Marxist–Leninist	Pierre Soublière	56	0.18	-0.26
Total valid votes		31,158	98.70	
Total rejected ballots		411	1.30	-0.28
Turnout		31,569	57.62	-6.22
Eligible voters		54,787		
Liberal hold		Swing		-18.46
Source(s) "Rapport des résultats officiels du scrutin". Élections Québec.

2014 Quebec general election
Party	Candidate	Votes	%	±%
Liberal	Maryse Gaudreault	18,213	55.17	+15.69
Parti Québécois	Gilles Aubé	7,209	21.84	–10.24
Québec solidaire	Benoit Renaud	3,647	11.05	+3.11
Coalition Avenir Québec	Jean Bosco Citegetse	3,609	10.93	–5.02
Option nationale	Eid Harb	189	0.57	–0.29
Marxist–Leninist	Gabriel Girard Bernier	146	0.44	+0.22
Total valid votes		33,013		
Liberal hold		Swing		+12.96

2012 Quebec general election
Party	Candidate	Votes	%	±%
Liberal	Maryse Gaudreault	13,179	39.48	-11.79
Parti Québécois	Gilles Aubé	10,708	32.08	-1.10
Coalition Avenir Québec	Étienne Boulrice	5,323	15.95	+15.95
Québec solidaire	Bill Clennett	2,651	7.94	-0.83
Green	Jozyam Ilsa Fontaine	781	2.34	+2.34
Option nationale	Mikaël St-Louis	287	0.86	+0.86
Parti nul	Marc Fiset	260	0.78	+0.78
Quebec Citizens' Union	Kamal Maghri	119	0.36	+0.36
Marxist–Leninist	Gabriel Girard Bernier	72	0.22	-0.21
Total valid votes			33,380	–
Total rejected ballots			320	–
Turnout			65.23	
Electors on the lists			51,663	–

2008 Quebec general election: Hull
Party	Candidate	Votes	%
Liberal	Maryse Gaudreault	11,651	51.27
Parti Québécois	Gilles Aubé	7,541	33.18
Québec solidaire	Bill Clennett	1,994	8.77
Action démocratique	Renée Gagné	1,309	5.76
Parti indépendantiste	Jean-Roch Villemaire	134	0.59
Marxist–Leninist	Gabriel Girard-Bernier	97	0.43
Total valid votes		22,726	100.00
Rejected and declined votes		317	
Turnout		23,043	47.72
Electors on the lists		48,290	
Source: Official Results, Government of Quebec

Hull by-election, May 12, 2008
Party	Candidate	Votes	%	±%
Liberal	Maryse Gaudreault	7,403	45.21	+2.68
Parti Québécois	Gilles Aubé	5,559	33.95	+10.02
Québec solidaire	Bill Clennett	1,589	9.70	+1.77
Green	Brian Gibb	1,185	7.24	-1.09
Action démocratique	Jean-Philip Ruel	529	3.23	-13.83
Parti indépendantiste	Jean-Roch Villemaire	111	0.68	–
