= Hull (provincial electoral district) =

Provincial electoral district in Quebec, Canada

Quebec electoral district
- Location in Gatineau
- Coordinates: 45.442°N 75.752°W

Provincial electoral district
- Legislature: National Assembly of Quebec
MNA
Sacha Cannon
Liberal
- District created: 1919
- First contested: 1919
- Last contested: 2026

Demographics
- Population (2006): 68,374
- Electors (2012): 51,226
- Area (km²): 53.8
- Pop. density (per km²): 1,270.9
- Census division: Gatineau (part)
- Census subdivision: Gatineau (part)

Hull is provincial electoral district located in the Outaouais region of Quebec, Canada. It includes the entire Hull sector of the city of Gatineau, as well as some additional territory.

It was created for the 1919 election from part of the Ottawa electoral district.

In the change from the 2001 to the 2011 electoral map, it gained some territory from Pontiac and also a very small amount of territory from Gatineau electoral district.

In 2026, it gained the Côte-d'Azur neighbourhood from Gatineau.

== Members of the Legislative Assembly / National Assembly ==
Legislature	Years	Member	Party
Riding created from Ottawa
15th	1919–1923	Joseph Caron	Liberal
16th	1923–1927	Joseph-Roméo Lafond	Liberal
17th	1927–1931	Aimé Guertin	Conservative
18th	1931–1935	Aimé Guertin	Conservative
19th	1935–1936	Alexis Caron	Liberal
20th	1936–1939	Alexandre Taché	Union Nationale
21st	1939–1944	Alexis Caron	Liberal
22nd	1944–1948	Alexandre Taché	Union Nationale
23rd	1948–1952	Alexandre Taché	Union Nationale
24th	1952–1956	Alexandre Taché	Union Nationale
25th	1956–1960	Oswald Parent	Liberal
26th	1960–1962	Oswald Parent	Liberal
27th	1962–1966	Oswald Parent	Liberal
28th	1966–1970	Oswald Parent	Liberal
29th	1970–1973	Oswald Parent	Liberal
30th	1973–1976	Oswald Parent	Liberal
31st	1976–1981	Jocelyne Ouellette	Parti Québécois
32nd	1981–1985	Gilles Rocheleau	Liberal
33rd	1985–1988	Gilles Rocheleau	Liberal
34th	1989–1994	Robert LeSage	Liberal
35th	1994–1998	Robert LeSage	Liberal
36th	1998–2003	Roch Cholette	Liberal
37th	2003–2007	Roch Cholette	Liberal
38th	2007–2008	Roch Cholette	Liberal
39th	2008–2012	Maryse Gaudreault	Liberal
40th	2012–2014	Maryse Gaudreault	Liberal
41st	2014–2018	Maryse Gaudreault	Liberal
42nd	2018–2022	Maryse Gaudreault	Liberal
43rd	2022–2026	Suzanne Tremblay	Coalition Avenir Québec
44th	2026–Present	Sacha Cannon	Liberal

== Election results ==
2026 Quebec general election
** Preliminary results — Not yet official **
Party	Candidate	Votes	%	±%
Liberal	Sacha Cannon	14,582	42.50	+16.93
Québec solidaire	Mariève Forest	6,032	17.58	–2.67
Parti Québécois	Paul Fauteux	5,798	16.90	+6.89
Coalition Avenir Québec	Suzanne Tremblay	4,072	11.87	–23.58
Conservative	Anne-Marie Couturier	3,639	10.61	+3.85
Canadian	Danilo Velasquez	185	0.54	N/A
Total valid votes		34,308	98.65	–0.19
Total rejected ballots		468	1.35	+0.19
Turnout		34,776	56.96	–0.98
Electors on the lists		61,050		
Liberal notional gain from Coalition Avenir Québec		Swing		+9.80
Source: Élections Québec

2022 Quebec general election redistributed results
Party	Vote	%
Coalition Avenir Québec	12,199	35.45
Liberal	8,800	25.57
Québec solidaire	6,968	20.25
Parti Québécois	3,443	10.01
Conservative	2,327	6.76
Others	673	1.96

2022 Quebec general election
Party	Candidate	Votes	%	±%
Coalition Avenir Québec	Suzanne Tremblay	11,060	34.64	+8.20
Liberal	Maryse Gaudreault	8,276	25.92	-7.84
Québec solidaire	Mathieu Perron-Dufour	6,623	20.75	+2.25
Parti Québécois	Camille Pellerin-Forget	3,122	9.78	-3.82
Conservative	Lise Couture	2,189	6.86	+5.40
Green	Rachid Jemmah	655	2.05	-1.48
Total valid votes		31,925	98.84	
Total rejected ballots		375	1.16	-0.14
Turnout		32,300	57.94	+0.31
Electors on the lists		55,751		
Coalition Avenir Québec gain from Liberal		Swing		+8.02

2018 Quebec general election
Party	Candidate	Votes	%	±%
Liberal	Maryse Gaudreault	10,519	33.76	-21.41
Coalition Avenir Québec	Rachel Bourdon	8,238	26.44	+15.51
Québec solidaire	Benoit Renaud	5,764	18.50	+7.45
Parti Québécois	Marysa Nadeau	4,238	13.60	-8.24
Green	Patricia Pilon	1,099	3.53	
New Democratic	Nichola St-Jean	721	2.31	
Conservative	Jean-Philippe Chaussé	454	1.46	
Citoyens au pouvoir	Marco Jetté	69	0.22	
Marxist–Leninist	Pierre Soublière	56	0.18	-0.26
Total valid votes		31,158	98.70	
Total rejected ballots		411	1.30	-0.28
Turnout		31,569	57.62	-6.22
Eligible voters		54,787		
Liberal hold		Swing		-18.46
Source(s) "Rapport des résultats officiels du scrutin". Élections Québec.

2014 Quebec general election
Party	Candidate	Votes	%	±%
Liberal	Maryse Gaudreault	18,213	55.17	+15.69
Parti Québécois	Gilles Aubé	7,209	21.84	–10.24
Québec solidaire	Benoit Renaud	3,647	11.05	+3.11
Coalition Avenir Québec	Jean Bosco Citegetse	3,609	10.93	–5.02
Option nationale	Eid Harb	189	0.57	–0.29
Marxist–Leninist	Gabriel Girard Bernier	146	0.44	+0.22
Total valid votes		33,013		
Liberal hold		Swing		+12.96

2012 Quebec general election
Party	Candidate	Votes	%	±%
Liberal	Maryse Gaudreault	13,179	39.48	-11.79
Parti Québécois	Gilles Aubé	10,708	32.08	-1.10
Coalition Avenir Québec	Étienne Boulrice	5,323	15.95	+15.95
Québec solidaire	Bill Clennett	2,651	7.94	-0.83
Green	Jozyam Ilsa Fontaine	781	2.34	+2.34
Option nationale	Mikaël St-Louis	287	0.86	+0.86
Parti nul	Marc Fiset	260	0.78	+0.78
Quebec Citizens' Union	Kamal Maghri	119	0.36	+0.36
Marxist–Leninist	Gabriel Girard Bernier	72	0.22	-0.21
Total valid votes			33,380	–
Total rejected ballots			320	–
Turnout			65.23	
Electors on the lists			51,663	–

2008 Quebec general election
Party	Candidate	Votes	%
Liberal	Maryse Gaudreault	11,651	51.27
Parti Québécois	Gilles Aubé	7,541	33.18
Québec solidaire	Bill Clennett	1,994	8.77
Action démocratique	Renée Gagné	1,309	5.76
Parti indépendantiste	Jean-Roch Villemaire	134	0.59
Marxist–Leninist	Gabriel Girard-Bernier	97	0.43
Total valid votes		22,726	100.00
Rejected and declined votes		317	
Turnout		23,043	47.72
Electors on the lists		48,290	
Source: Official Results, Government of Quebec

Hull by-election, May 12, 2008
Party	Candidate	Votes	%	±%
Liberal	Maryse Gaudreault	7,403	45.21	+2.68
Parti Québécois	Gilles Aubé	5,559	33.95	+10.02
Québec solidaire	Bill Clennett	1,589	9.70	+1.77
Green	Brian Gibb	1,185	7.24	-1.09
Action démocratique	Jean-Philip Ruel	529	3.23	-13.83
Parti indépendantiste	Jean-Roch Villemaire	111	0.68	–

2007 Quebec general election
Party	Candidate	Votes	%	±%
Liberal	Roch Cholette	12,643	42.53	
Parti Québécois	Marcel Painchaud	7,115	23.93	
Action démocratique	François Lizotte	5,071	17.06	
Green	Mélanie Perreault	2,476	8.33	–
Québec solidaire	Bill Clennett	2,358	7.93	
Marxist–Leninist	Gabriel Girard-Bernier	67	0.23	
Total valid votes		29,730	100.00	
Rejected and declined votes		237		
Turnout		29,967	61.26	
Electors on the lists		48,915		

2003 Quebec general election
Party	Candidate	Votes	%	±%
Liberal	Roch Cholette	16262	57.25	-2.05
Parti Québécois	Raphael J. Dery	7,234	25.47	-6.55
Action démocratique	Jean-Francois Larue	3,663	12.90	+6.22
UFP	Denise Veilleux	677	2.38	-
Bloc Pot	Stephane Salko	305	1.07	-
Independent	Maxime Gauld	155	0.55	-
Marxist–Leninist	Benoit Legros	72	0.25	0.00
Independent	Gheorghe Irimia	37	0.13	-

1998 Quebec general election
Party	Candidate	Votes	%	±%
Liberal	Roch Cholette	18,873	59.30	+2.74
Parti Québécois	Jacques Dupont	10,191	32.02	-9.10
Action démocratique	Mark Buzan	2,126	6.68	-
Socialist Democracy	Marc Bonhomme	291	0.91	-
Natural Law	Rita Bouchard	266	0.84	-
Marxist–Leninist	Mathieu-Henri Jetté	78	0.25	-0.02
Independent	Gheorghe Irimia	37	0.13	-

1995 Quebec referendum
Side	Votes	%
Non	28,553	69.73
Oui	12,394	30.27

1994 Quebec general election
Party	Candidate	Votes	%
Liberal	Robert LeSage	19,184	56.56
Parti Québécois	Michel Légère	13,947	41.12
Lemon	Denis Patenaude	452	1.33
Natural Law	Michel Dubois	231	0.68
Commonwealth of Canada	Harold Quesnel	56	0.17
Marxist–Leninist	Françoise Roy	46	0.14
Total valid votes		33,916	
Rejected and declined votes		291	
Turnout		34,207	78.33
Electors on the lists		43,670	

1992 Charlottetown Accord referendum
Side	Votes	%
Oui	18,979	56.44
Non	14,649	43.56

1989 Quebec general election
Party	Candidate	Votes	%
Liberal	Robert LeSage	13,980	55.25
Parti Québécois	Marcel Villeneuve	9,434	37.29
Unity	Glen E.P. Kealey	751	2.97
New Democratic	Charles Rheault	673	2.66
Lemon	Denis Patenaude	391	1.55
Marxist–Leninist	Pierre Soublière	72	0.28
Total valid votes		25,301	100.00
Rejected and declined votes		279	
Turnout		25,580	62.23
Electors on the lists		41,107	

Quebec provincial by-election, May 29, 1989
Party	Candidate	Votes	%	±%
Liberal	Robert LeSage	9,223	67.16	
Parti Québécois	Paul Lemaire	4,510	32.84	
Total valid votes		13,733	100.00	
Rejected and declined votes		291		
Turnout		14,024	35.46	
Electors on the lists		39,544		
Source: Official Results, Government of Quebec

1981 Quebec general election
Party	Candidate	Votes	%	±%
Liberal	Gilles Rocheleau	15,572	49.76	
Parti Québécois	Jocelyne Ouellette	15,116	48.30	
Union Nationale	Joe McGovern	263	0.84	–
Workers	Gilles Bourque	153	0.49	
Independent	Gilles Bégin	96	0.31	
Communist	Marc Bonhomme	59	0.19	
Marxist–Leninist	Pierre Soublière	35	0.11	
Total valid votes		31,294	100.00	
Rejected and declined votes		530		
Turnout		31,824	80.19	
Electors on the lists		39,686		

== See also ==
- List of Quebec provincial electoral districts
- Canadian provincial electoral districts
