= Suzanne Tremblay (Gatineau politician) =

Canadian politician

Member of the National Assembly of Quebec for Hull
- In office October 3, 2022 – October 5, 2026
- Preceded by: Maryse Gaudreault
- Succeeded by: Sacha Cannon

Personal details
- Born: 1977 (age 48–49) Chicoutimi-Nord, Quebec
- Party: Coalition Avenir Québec

Suzanne Tremblay is a Canadian politician, who was elected to the National Assembly of Quebec in the 2022 Quebec general election. She represented the riding of Hull as a member of the Coalition Avenir Québec until 2026.

== Electoral record ==
2022 Quebec general election: Hull
Party	Candidate	Votes	%	±%
Coalition Avenir Québec	Suzanne Tremblay	11,060	34.64	+8.20
Liberal	Maryse Gaudreault	8,276	25.92	-7.84
Québec solidaire	Mathieu Perron-Dufour	6,623	20.75	+2.25
Parti Québécois	Camille Pellerin-Forget	3,122	9.78	-3.82
Conservative	Lise Couture	2,189	6.86	+5.40
Green	Rachid Jemmah	655	2.05	-1.48
Total valid votes		31,925	98.84	
Total rejected ballots		375	1.16	-0.14
Turnout		32,300	57.94	+0.31
Electors on the lists		55,751		
Coalition Avenir Québec gain from Liberal		Swing		+8.02
