= Results breakdown of the 1988 Canadian federal election =

1988 Canadian federal election
- All 295 seats in the House of Commons of Canada; 148 seats needed for a majority
Party	Leader	Vote %	Seats	+/–
Progressive Conservative	Brian Mulroney	43.02	169	−42
Liberal	John Turner	31.92	83	+43
New Democratic	Ed Broadbent	20.38	43	+13
This lists parties that won seats. See the complete results below.
Prime Minister before	Prime Minister after election
Brian Mulroney; Progressive Conservative	Brian Mulroney; Progressive Conservative

== Results by Province and Territory ==
=== Alberta ===
Results in Alberta
Party	Seats	Second	Third	Fourth	Fifth	Sixth	Seventh	Eighth	Ninth	Tenth	Votes	%	+/-
Progressive Conservative	25	1									602,848	51.75	
NDP	1	11	9	5							202,802	17.41	
Reform		9	6	11							178,843	15.35	
Liberals		5	11	10							159,807	13.72	
Christian Heritage					9						12,305	1.06	
Confederation of Regions Western Party					3	8	3	2	1	1	1,868	0.16	
No affiliation to a recognised party					2	2	5	3	1		1,345	0.12	
Independent					2	1	1				1,188	0.1	
Libertarian					3	1					1,158	0.1	
Rhinoceros					2	2					1,067	0.09	
Green					2	1					1,013	0.09	
Commonwealth of Canada					1		3		1		376	0.03	
Communist						2		1			289	0.02	
Total	26										1,164,909	100.0	

=== British Columbia ===
Results in British Columbia
Party	Seats	Second	Third	Fourth	Fifth	Sixth	Seventh	Eighth	Ninth	Tenth	Eleventh	Twelfth	Votes	%	+/-
NDP	19	9	4										566,582	36.96	
Progressive Conservative	12	19	1										541,172	35.3	
Liberals	1	4	26	1									312,803	20.4	
Reform			1	24	5								75,308	4.91	
Christian Heritage				5	6	1							15,106	0.99	
Green				2	11	5	1	1					8,933	0.58	
Libertarian					3	8	5						4,723	0.31	
Rhinoceros					3	5	3						3,310	0.22	
Communist						2	3	5	2				1,304	0.09	
Independent					1	3	2	3					1,222	0.08	
No affiliation to a recognised party					1	1	3	3	4	1		1	1,213	0.08	
Social Credit					1	1							1,169	0.08	
Confederation of Regions Western Party						1		1		1			158	0.01	
Commonwealth of Canada											1		23	0	
Total	32												1,533,026	100.0	

=== Manitoba ===
Results in Manitoba
Party	Seats	Second	Third	Fourth	Fifth	Sixth	Seventh	Eighth	Votes	%	+/-
Progressive Conservative	7	3	4						200,100	36.85	
Liberals	5	7	2						198,408	36.54	
NDP	2	4	7	1					115,638	21.3	
Reform			1	10	1				17,759	3.27	
Christian Heritage				1	2				4,297	0.79	
Confederation of Regions Western Party					2	3			1,943	0.36	
Libertarian					5				1,385	0.26	
Independent				1	2	2	1		1,218	0.22	
No affiliation to a recognised party					1	3	2	2	1,002	0.18	
Rhinoceros							2		770	0.14	
Communist						2	1		421	0.08	
Total	14								542,941	100.0	

=== New Brunswick ===
Results in New Brunswick
Party	Seats	Second	Third	Fourth	Fifth	Sixth	Votes	%	+/-
Liberals	5	5					173,967	45.35	
Progressive Conservative	5	5					155,056	40.42	
NDP			9	1			35,790	9.33	
Confederation of Regions Western Party			1	6			16,654	4.34	
Christian Heritage					1		909	0.24	
Independent						2	415	0.11	
Rhinoceros					1		316	0.08	
Libertarian					1		289	0.08	
No affiliation to a recognised party						1	175	0.05	
Total	10						383,571	100.0	

=== Newfoundland and Labrador ===
Results in Newfoundland and Labrador
Party	Seats	Second	Third	Fourth	Votes	%	+/-
Liberals	5	1	1		115,588	45.02	
Progressive Conservative	2	5			108,349	42.2	
NDP		1	6		31,769	12.37	
Christian Heritage				1	739	0.29	
Independent				1	286	0.11	
Total	7				256,731	100.0	

=== Northwest Territories ===
Results in Northwest Territories
Party	Seats	Second	Third	Fourth	Fifth	Votes	%	+/-
Liberals	2					8,771	41.41	
NDP		1	1			5,993	28.29	
Progressive Conservative		1	1			5,585	26.37	
Independent				2	1	833	3.93	
Total	2					21,182	100.0	

=== Nova Scotia ===
Results in Nova Scotia
Party	Seats	Second	Third	Fourth	Fifth	Sixth	Seventh	Votes	%	+/-
Liberals	6	5						223,175	46.51	
Progressive Conservative	5	6						196,390	40.93	
NDP			11					54,515	11.36	
Christian Heritage				3				3,578	0.75	
Libertarian				3				1,068	0.22	
Independent					1	1		344	0.07	
Commonwealth of Canada				1			1	311	0.06	
No affiliation to a recognised party					2			309	0.06	
Communist					1			151	0.03	
Total	11							479,841	100.0	

=== Ontario ===
Results in Ontario
Party	Seats	Second	Third	Fourth	Fifth	Sixth	Seventh	Eighth	Ninth	Tenth	Votes	%	+/-
Liberals	43	51	4								1,819,095	38.87	
Progressive Conservative	46	35	18								1,787,271	38.19	
NDP	10	13	76								939,928	20.08	
Christian Heritage				31							64,707	1.38	
Libertarian			1	31	18	3		1			23,427	0.5	
Confederation of Regions Western Party				7	4		1				18,626	0.4	
No affiliation to a recognised party				7	6	6	2	3	1		7,020	0.15	
Rhinoceros				4	9	3	1				5,548	0.12	
Green				5	8	2					4,964	0.11	
Independent				1	8	7	4	1			4,186	0.09	
Communist				3	6	9	2				2,720	0.06	
Commonwealth of Canada				1	7	4	6	1	1		2,320	0.05	
Social Credit					1						168	0	
CCF										1	30	0	
Total	99										4,680,010	100.0	

=== Prince Edward Island ===
Results in Prince Edward Island
Party	Seats	Second	Third	Fourth	Fifth	Votes	%	+/-
Liberals	4					37,761	49.92	
Progressive Conservative		4				31,372	41.47	
NDP			4			5,661	7.48	
Independent				1		569	0.75	
Christian Heritage					1	281	0.37	
Total	4					75,644	100.0	

=== Quebec ===
Results in Quebec
Party	Seats	Second	Third	Fourth	Fifth	Sixth	Seventh	Eighth	Ninth	Tenth	Eleventh	Votes	%	+/-
Progressive Conservative	63	12										1,844,279	52.68	
Liberals	12	56	7									1,058,952	30.25	
NDP		7	67	1								488,633	13.96	
Rhinoceros				28	11							41,162	1.18	
Green				20	8	1						32,096	0.92	
No affiliation to a recognised party				4	12	8	5	4	2	1		13,313	0.38	
Independent			1	1	2	2						12,721	0.36	
Commonwealth of Canada				2	7	7	5	3	4		1	4,386	0.13	
Communist					2	4	3	2				2,105	0.06	
Social Credit				3		1	1	1				2,070	0.06	
Libertarian					1	1	1	1				1,020	0.03	
Christian Heritage						1						356	0.01	
Total	75											3,501,093	100.0	

=== Saskatchewan ===
Results in Saskatchewan
Party	Seats	Second	Third	Fourth	Fifth	Votes	%	+/-
NDP	10	4				231,358	44.17	
Progressive Conservative	4	10				190,597	36.39	
Liberals			14			95,295	18.19	
Reform				4		3,857	0.74	
Confederation of Regions Western Party				4	2	2,093	0.4	
Green				1		222	0.04	
No affiliation to a recognised party				1		139	0.03	
Communist				1		76	0.01	
Libertarian					1	65	0.01	
Commonwealth of Canada					1	51	0.01	
Total	14					523,753	100.0	

=== Yukon ===
Results in Yukon
Party	Seats	Second	Third	Fourth	Votes	%	+/-
NDP	1				6,594	51.42	
Progressive Conservative		1			4,524	35.28	
Liberals			1		1,450	11.31	
Christian Heritage				1	255	1.99	
Total	1				12,823	100.0	
