= Joseph-Roméo Lafond =

Canadian politician

Joseph-Roméo Lafond (March 9, 1879 – January 13, 1931) was a Canadian retail merchant, farmer and politician in Quebec. He represented Hull in the Legislative Assembly of Quebec from 1923 to 1927 as a Liberal.

The son of Gédéon Lafond, a merchant, and Alvina Grondin, he was born in Hull and was educated at the University of Ottawa and the Université Laval. He succeeded his father as head of the family business. Lafond was president of the West Quebec section of the Association des marchands détaillants.

He was elected to the Quebec assembly in 1923 but was defeated by Aimé Guertin when he ran for reelection as an independent Liberal in 1927.

In 1904, he married Laurence Leduc.

His brother-in-law Arthur Trahan served in the Quebec assembly and the Canadian House of Commons.

Lafond died in Hull at the age of 51.
