= Sacha Cannon =

Canadian politician

Sacha Cannon MNA

Member of the National Assembly for Hull
- Incumbent
- Assumed office October 5, 2026
- Preceded by: Suzanne Tremblay

Personal details
- Party: Liberal
- Parent: Lawrence Cannon (father)

Sacha Cannon is a Canadian politician who is a candidate for the National Assembly of Quebec for Hull in the 2026 Quebec general election as a member of the Quebec Liberal Party. He is also the son of Lawrence Cannon, the former federal Conservative and provincial Liberal cabinet minister.
