= Ferdinand-Ambroise Gendron =

Canadian politician

Ferdinand-Ambroise Gendron (February 10, 1856 – August 9, 1917) was a lumber merchant and political figure in Quebec. He represented Ottawa electoral district in the Legislative Assembly of Quebec from 1904 to 1917 as a Liberal.

He was born in Beauport, Canada East, the son of Ambroise Gendron and Esther Chamberland, and moved to Hull in 1876. Gendron was employed by the E. B. Eddy Company as a wood inspector and then general superintendent of lumber yards. He married Corrine Lapierre in 1881. In 1890, in partnership with Adrien Chevrier, he went into business on his own in the lumber trade. Gendron was president of the Hurricanaw Lumber Company and the Raven Lake Mining Company. He was also crown lands agent for Ottawa and Labelle and Pontiac districts from 1898 to 1905. Gendron served on the town council for Hull from 1902 to 1903 and was mayor from 1903 to 1904. He died in office in Amos at the age of 61 and was buried in Hull.

His sister Clara married Simon-Napoléon Parent, who later served as premier of Quebec. His brother, Romuald Montézuma Gendron, also served as an MP in the 1920s

In 1915, a covered bridge was built across the Gatineau River near the town of Wakefield and named the Gendron Bridge in his honour. The original bridge was destroyed after being set on fire by an arsonist in 1984 but was later rebuilt.
