= 1989 Quebec general election =

Canadian provincial election

- September 25, 1989

125 seats in the 34th National Assembly of Quebec 63 seats were needed for a majority
- Turnout: 75.02% (▼0.67%)
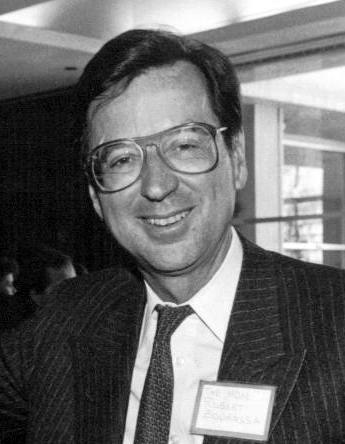

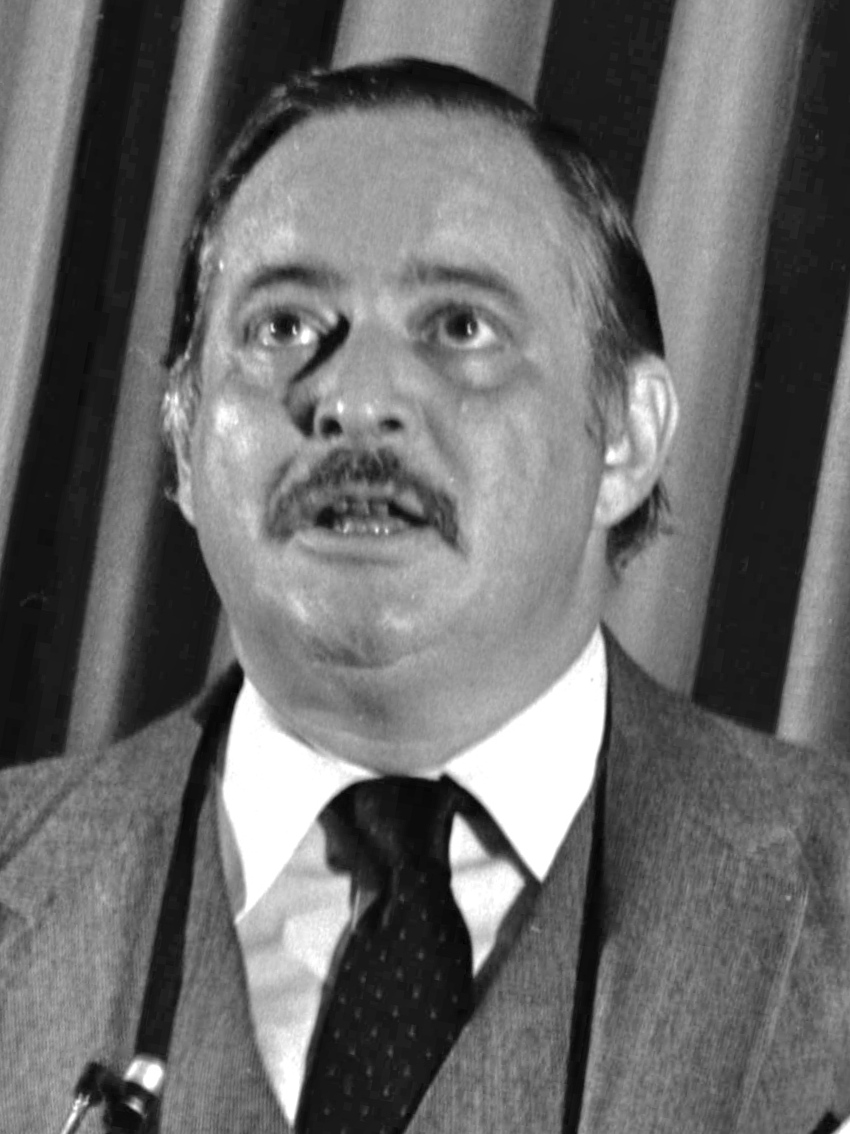
	First party	Second party	Third party
			EP
Leader	Robert Bourassa	Jacques Parizeau	Robert Libman
Party	Liberal	Parti Québécois	Equality
Leader since	October 15, 1983	March 18, 1988	1989
Leader's seat	Saint-Laurent	L'Assomption	D'Arcy-McGee
Last election	99 seats, 55.99%	23 seats, 38.69%	pre-creation
Seats won	92	29	4
Seat change	▼7	▲6	▲4
Popular vote	1,702,808	1,369,067	125,726
Percentage	49.95%	40.16%	3.69%
Swing	▼6.04%	▲1.47%
- Popular vote by riding. As this is an FPTP election, seat totals are not determined by popular vote, but instead via results by each riding. Click the map for more details.
Premier before election
Robert Bourassa
Liberal
Premier after election
Robert Bourassa
Liberal

The 1989 Quebec general election was held on September 25, 1989, to elect members of the National Assembly of the Province of Quebec, Canada. The incumbent Quebec Liberal Party, led by Premier Robert Bourassa, won re-election, defeating the Parti Québécois, led by Jacques Parizeau.

This election was notable for the arrival of the Equality Party, which advocated English-speaking minority rights. It won four seats, but never had any success in any subsequent election.

== 1988 redistribution of ridings ==
The Commission de la représentation électorale performed a redistribution in 1988, which increased the number of seats in the National Assembly from 122 to 125 for the next general election:

Abolished ridings	New ridings
Drawn from parts of other ridings
	Les Chutes-de-la-Chaudière (Note: drawn from parts of Beauce-Nord and Lévis)
	Masson (Note: drawn from parts of L'Assomption and Terrebonne)
	Pointe-aux-Trembles (Note: drawn from parts of Anjou, Bourget and LaFontaine)
Reorganization of ridings
Beauharnois; Huntingdon; Vaudreuil-Soulanges	Beauharnois-Huntingdon; Salaberry-Soulanges; Vaudreuil
Merger of ridings
Saint-Jacques; Sainte-Marie	Sainte-Marie–Saint-Jacques
Division of ridings
Laprairie	La Prairie; La Pinière
Renaming of ridings
L'Acadie	Acadie
Maisonneuve	Hochelaga-Maisonneuve
Nicolet	Nicolet-Yamaska

== Opinion polls ==
Voting intentions (1985-1989) Liberal Parti Québécois Equality Party NDP

Evolution of voting intentions at provincial level
Polling firm	Last day of survey	Source	QLP	PQ	EQP	Other	ME	Sample
Election 1989	September 25, 1989		49.95	40.16	3.69	6.20		
Sorecom	August 29, 1989		48	38	5	—N/a	—N/a	506
Sorecom	August 26, 1989		44	37	7	—N/a	—N/a	1,000
Sorecom	June 1989		53	35	—N/a	—N/a	—N/a	—N/a
Election 1985	December 2, 1985		55.99	38.69	-	5.32		

=== Polling by Language ===
Date(s)	Firm	Sample	Quebec Liberal Party			Parti Québécois			Other	Ref.
Date(s)	Firm	Sample	Francophones	Non Francophones	Francophones	Non Francophones	Francophones	Non Francophones		Ref.
September 17, 1989	CROP		49%	55%	44%		0	30% (Note: 30 for Equality Party)	HTML	
August 29, 1989	Sorecom		46%	47%	44%	3%	0	28% (Note: 28 for Equality Party)	HTML	
August 26, 1989	Sorecom		43%	34%	44%	9%	0	47% (Note: Equality Party)	HTML	
May 18, 1988	CROP		57%	92%	33%	4%	10%	4%	HTML	
September 30, 1987	Sorecom		48%	77%	32%		18%	20%	HTML	
September 26, 1986	Sorecom		55%		39%				HTML	
May 25, 1986	Sorecom		45%		47%				HTML	

== Results ==
Elections to the National Assembly of Quebec (1989)
Political party	Party leader	MNAs				Votes			
Political party	Party leader	Candidates	1981	1985	±	#	±	%	± (pp)
Liberal	Robert Bourassa	125	99	92	7▼	1,702,808	207,499▼	49.95%	6.04▼
Parti Québécois	Jacques Parizeau	125	23	29	6▲	1,369,067	49,059▲	40.16%	1.47▲
Equality	Robert Libman	19	–	4	4▲	125,726	125,726▲	3.69%	New
Unity	James Atkinson	16	–	–	–	33,862	33,862▲	0.99%	New
Green	Jean Ouimet	46	–	–	–	67,675	63,062▲	1.99%	1.85▲
New Democratic	Gaétan Nadeau	55	–	–	–	41,504	41,084▼	1.22%	1.20▼
Independent		32	–	–	–	23,751	15,896▲	0.70%	0.47▲
Lemon	Denis Patenaude	11	–	–	–	7,550	7,550▲	0.22%	New
Independent PQ		1	–	–	–	6,046	6,046▲	0.18%	New
Workers	Gérard Lachance	19	–	–	–	5,497	5,110▲	0.16%	0.15▲
Progressive Conservative	Robert Coppenrath	12	–	–	–	4,750	30,460▼	0.14%	0.89▼
Parti indépendantiste	Gilles Rhéaume	12	–	–	–	4,607	10,816▼	0.14%	0.31▼
Marxist–Leninist	Christine Robidoux	30	–	–	–	4,245	4,245▲	0.12%	New
Parti 51	André Perron	11	–	–	–	3,846	3,846▲	0.11%	New
United Social Credit	Jean-Paul Poulin	11	–	–	–	2,973	1,323▲	0.09%	0.04▲
Socialist Movement		10	–	–	–	2,203	394▲	0.06%	0.01▲
Commonwealth of Canada		11	–	–	–	1,799	441▼	0.05%	0.02▼
Communist	Marianne Roy	10	–	–	–	808	26▼	0.02%	–
Libertarian		1	–	–	–	192	192▲	0.01%	New
Total		557	122	125		3,408,909		100.00%	
Rejected ballots						92,159	39,534▲		
Voter turnout						3,501,068	36,836▲	75.69	0.73▼
Registered electors						4690,690	94,090▲		

=== Vote and seat summaries ===
Ternary plots - shift of electoral support (1985-1989)
1985

1989
Electoral districts identified by colours of winning parties

Seats and popular vote by party
Party	Seats	Votes	Change (pp)
█ Liberal	92 / 125	49.95%	-6.04
█ Parti Québécois	29 / 125	40.16%	1.47
█ Equality/Unity	4 / 125	4.68%	4.68
█ Green	0 / 125	1.99%	1.85
█ New Democratic	0 / 125	1.22%	-1.20
█ Progressive Conservative	0 / 125	0.14%	-0.89
█ Independent	0 / 125	0.70%	0.47
█ Other	0 / 125	1.17%	-0.34

=== Synopsis of results ===
Results by riding - 1989 Quebec general election
Riding	Winning party						Turnout (Note: including spoilt ballots)	Votes								
Name	1985	Party	Votes	Share	Margin #	Margin %	Turnout	Lib	PQ	Eq/Un	Green	NDP	I-PQ	Ind	Oth	Total
Abitibi-Est	Lib	Lib	12,099	55.67%	2,465	11.34%	73.47%	12,099	9,634	–	–	–	–	–	–	21,733
Abitibi-Ouest	PQ	PQ	15,588	67.40%	8,047	34.79%	72.97%	7,541	15,588	–	–	–	–	–	–	23,129
Acadie	Lib	Lib	19,077	65.62%	11,651	40.07%	74.64%	19,077	7,426	–	–	1,083	–	–	1,488	29,074
Anjou	PQ	Lib	12,554	51.89%	2,109	8.72%	77.26%	12,554	10,445	–	–	688	–	–	506	24,193
Argenteuil	Lib	Lib	14,187	51.91%	5,098	18.65%	73.43%	14,187	9,089	4,052	–	–	–	–	–	27,328
Arthabaska	Lib	PQ	16,569	51.48%	2,692	8.36%	81.63%	13,877	16,569	–	–	–	–	1,741	–	32,187
Beauce-Nord	Lib	Lib	13,660	61.13%	6,094	27.27%	75.94%	13,660	7,566	–	–	672	–	–	449	22,347
Beauce-Sud	Lib	Lib	18,623	69.78%	13,301	49.84%	73.25%	18,623	5,322	–	2,745	–	–	–	–	26,690
Beauharnois-Huntingdon	New	Lib	12,348	48.23%	3,064	11.97%	76.23%	12,348	9,284	3,969	–	–	–	–	–	25,601
Bellechasse	Lib	Lib	11,114	50.43%	191	0.87%	76.43%	11,114	10,923	–	–	–	–	–	–	22,037
Berthier	Lib	Lib	17,630	61.63%	6,652	23.25%	76.32%	17,630	10,978	–	–	–	–	–	–	28,608
Bertrand	PQ	PQ	20,188	53.75%	2,819	7.51%	81.58%	17,369	20,188	–	–	–	–	–	–	37,557
Bonaventure	Lib	Lib	11,778	59.65%	6,386	32.34%	73.94%	11,778	5,392	1,266	1,062	–	–	–	246	19,744
Bourassa	Lib	Lib	13,747	56.52%	4,879	20.06%	73.49%	13,747	8,868	–	–	–	–	645	1,061	24,321
Bourget	Lib	Lib	12,417	47.50%	159	0.61%	76.77%	12,417	12,258	–	–	–	–	428	1,039	26,142
Brome-Missisquoi	Lib	Lib	13,502	54.18%	7,264	29.15%	75.72%	13,502	6,238	2,756	–	–	–	2,073	353	24,922
Chambly	Lib	Lib	15,435	48.62%	2,496	7.86%	80.35%	15,435	12,939	–	2,797	–	–	–	572	31,743
Champlain	Lib	Lib	14,325	45.61%	3,290	10.48%	77.87%	14,325	11,035	–	–	–	6,046	–	–	31,406
Chapleau	Lib	Lib	15,569	55.24%	2,954	10.48%	63.80%	15,569	12,615	–	–	–	–	–	–	28,184
Charlesbourg	Lib	Lib	20,818	59.76%	9,699	27.84%	80.22%	20,818	11,119	–	–	1,140	–	–	1,761	34,838
Charlevoix	Lib	Lib	11,816	54.13%	1,804	8.26%	73.82%	11,816	10,012	–	–	–	–	–	–	21,828
Châteauguay	Lib	Lib	12,528	43.64%	2,053	7.15%	78.94%	12,528	10,475	5,007	–	–	–	–	697	28,707
Chauveau	Lib	Lib	19,021	53.76%	5,622	15.89%	74.05%	19,021	13,399	–	2,961	–	–	–	–	35,381
Chicoutimi	PQ	PQ	18,047	55.81%	4,933	15.26%	75.48%	13,114	18,047	–	–	914	–	–	260	32,335
Chomedey	Lib	Lib	16,895	53.39%	9,112	28.80%	72.56%	16,895	7,783	5,889	–	501	–	476	98	31,642
Crémazie	Lib	Lib	15,100	50.20%	2,364	7.86%	79.06%	15,100	12,736	–	1,385	496	–	–	361	30,078
D'Arcy-McGee	Lib	Eq	15,746	57.85%	6,069	22.30%	76.34%	9,677	829	15,746	532	173	–	262	–	27,219
Deux-Montagnes	Lib	Lib	15,656	46.48%	515	1.53%	75.95%	15,656	15,141	2,449	–	–	–	–	435	33,681
Dorion	Lib	Lib	11,632	51.00%	2,207	9.68%	75.95%	11,632	9,425	–	878	437	–	–	434	22,806
Drummond	Lib	Lib	17,506	56.26%	4,994	16.05%	77.21%	17,506	12,512	–	–	–	–	–	1,100	31,118
Dubuc	PQ	PQ	12,589	54.91%	2,252	9.82%	73.04%	10,337	12,589	–	–	–	–	–	–	22,926
Duplessis	PQ	PQ	12,066	49.86%	610	2.52%	71.70%	11,456	12,066	–	–	–	–	678	–	24,200
Fabre	Lib	Lib	16,283	51.68%	2,579	8.19%	79.27%	16,283	13,704	–	–	–	–	–	1,520	31,507
Frontenac	Lib	Lib	17,078	63.76%	9,183	34.28%	80.90%	17,078	7,895	–	1,813	–	–	–	–	26,786
Gaspé	Lib	Lib	11,287	51.00%	1,937	8.75%	71.38%	11,287	9,350	1,160	–	–	–	334	–	22,131
Gatineau	Lib	Lib	12,179	56.00%	5,054	23.24%	65.54%	12,179	7,125	2,446	–	–	–	–	–	21,750
Gouin	PQ	PQ	10,568	51.03%	2,185	10.55%	73.38%	8,383	10,568	–	929	482	–	–	347	20,709
Groulx	Lib	Lib	17,184	48.10%	1,305	3.65%	74.99%	17,184	15,879	1,589	–	–	–	–	1,077	35,729
Hochelaga-Maisonneuve (Note: formerly Maisonneuve)	PQ	PQ	14,639	63.50%	7,890	34.23%	68.55%	6,749	14,639	–	685	326	–	114	539	23,052
Hull	Lib	Lib	13,980	55.25%	4,546	17.97%	62.17%	13,980	9,434	751	–	673	–	–	463	25,301
Iberville	Lib	Lib	16,617	51.07%	3,245	9.97%	76.40%	16,617	13,372	–	1,576	971	–	–	–	32,536
Îles-de-la-Madeleine	Lib	Lib	4,373	51.49%	253	2.98%	83.77%	4,373	4,120	–	–	–	–	–	–	8,493
Jacques-Cartier	Lib	Eq	14,821	43.90%	802	2.38%	79.84%	14,019	3,035	14,821	1,419	228	–	50	192	33,764
Jean-Talon	Lib	Lib	16,530	54.40%	4,258	14.01%	83.87%	16,530	12,272	–	–	977	–	606	–	30,385
Jeanne-Mance	Lib	Lib	17,296	65.06%	10,337	38.88%	70.80%	17,296	6,959	1,930	–	–	–	–	399	26,584
Johnson	PQ	PQ	12,731	49.22%	1,141	4.41%	78.47%	11,590	12,731	401	461	185	–	238	257	25,863
Joliette	PQ	PQ	18,582	60.68%	9,537	31.14%	77.92%	9,045	18,582	–	2,854	–	–	–	142	30,623
Jonquière	PQ	PQ	17,294	56.05%	5,505	17.84%	76.11%	11,789	17,294	–	–	1,774	–	–	–	30,857
Kamouraska-Témiscouata	Lib	Lib	12,354	55.67%	4,121	18.57%	66.68%	12,354	8,233	–	1,605	–	–	–	–	22,192
L'Assomption	Lib	PQ	18,590	55.52%	5,134	15.33%	80.24%	13,456	18,590	–	1,439	–	–	–	–	33,485
La Peltrie	Lib	Lib	20,528	52.17%	4,278	10.87%	80.12%	20,528	16,250	–	–	2,567	–	–	–	39,345
Labelle	Lib	PQ	16,897	54.80%	2,959	9.60%	73.99%	13,938	16,897	–	–	–	–	–	–	30,835
Lac-Saint-Jean	PQ	PQ	15,370	55.04%	3,623	12.97%	77.55%	11,747	15,370	–	–	–	–	356	450	27,923
LaFontaine	Lib	Lib	15,328	57.83%	5,757	21.72%	70.73%	15,328	9,571	–	–	763	–	–	843	26,505
La Pinière	New	Lib	17,155	58.16%	6,985	23.68%	76.28%	17,155	10,170	–	–	1,237	–	–	935	29,497
Laporte	Lib	Lib	11,720	39.58%	2,907	9.82%	78.70%	11,720	8,813	–	1,265	377	–	7,436	–	29,611
La Prairie	New	PQ	14,320	47.28%	790	2.61%	77.29%	13,530	14,320	–	1,906	–	–	–	529	30,285
Laurier	Lib	Lib	11,027	54.98%	5,371	26.78%	67.17%	11,027	5,656	–	1,170	777	–	721	704	20,055
Laval-des-Rapides	Lib	Lib	14,821	51.52%	2,199	7.64%	75.63%	14,821	12,622	–	–	–	–	972	354	28,769
Laviolette	PQ	PQ	17,021	66.18%	8,324	32.37%	75.76%	8,697	17,021	–	–	–	–	–	–	25,718
Les Chutes-de-la-Chaudière	New	PQ	15,889	48.94%	1,084	3.34%	78.85%	14,805	15,889	–	–	1,505	–	–	270	32,469
Lévis	PQ	PQ	17,968	66.67%	9,501	35.25%	78.90%	8,467	17,968	–	–	–	–	–	517	26,952
Limoilou	Lib	Lib	15,671	55.50%	5,876	20.81%	74.42%	15,671	9,795	–	1,436	645	–	–	689	28,236
Lotbinière	Lib	Lib	13,335	59.85%	5,593	25.10%	78.23%	13,335	7,742	–	–	616	–	–	589	22,282
Louis-Hébert	Lib	Lib	14,822	47.67%	885	2.85%	80.57%	14,822	13,937	–	1,657	584	–	–	96	31,096
Marguerite-Bourgeoys	Lib	Lib	12,722	49.88%	6,647	26.06%	75.09%	12,722	6,075	6,171	–	–	–	–	538	25,506
Marie-Victorin	PQ	PQ	13,582	53.68%	3,546	14.02%	74.85%	10,036	13,582	–	1,360	–	–	–	322	25,300
Marquette	Lib	Lib	13,457	48.88%	4,980	18.09%	74.57%	13,457	8,477	4,762	–	569	–	–	267	27,532
Maskinongé	Lib	Lib	18,191	63.63%	7,795	27.27%	76.56%	18,191	10,396	–	–	–	–	–	–	28,587
Masson	New	PQ	19,615	59.42%	7,967	24.14%	73.76%	11,648	19,615	–	1,135	611	–	–	–	33,009
Matane	Lib	Lib	11,061	57.52%	2,891	15.03%	72.26%	11,061	8,170	–	–	–	–	–	–	19,231
Matapédia	Lib	Lib	11,085	60.15%	3,740	20.29%	73.19%	11,085	7,345	–	–	–	–	–	–	18,430
Mégantic-Compton	Lib	Lib	12,608	60.39%	6,362	30.47%	76.69%	12,608	6,246	1,039	740	–	–	–	245	20,878
Mercier	PQ	PQ	13,371	57.15%	6,254	26.73%	71.80%	7,117	13,371	–	1,961	567	–	–	382	23,398
Mille-Îles	Lib	Lib	16,436	56.67%	3,867	13.33%	79.37%	16,436	12,569	–	–	–	–	–	–	29,005
Mont-Royal	Lib	Lib	10,846	53.57%	8,390	41.44%	70.36%	10,846	2,456	5,681	941	229	–	–	92	20,245
Montmagny-L'Islet	Lib	Lib	12,688	57.75%	4,814	21.91%	71.21%	12,688	7,874	–	1,407	–	–	–	–	21,969
Montmorency	Lib	Lib	20,653	59.95%	9,373	27.21%	75.54%	20,653	11,280	–	–	1,726	–	524	266	34,449
Nelligan	Lib	Lib	16,284	47.03%	9,221	26.63%	74.44%	16,284	7,063	10,249	–	664	–	367	–	34,627
Nicolet-Yamaska (Note: formerly Nicolet)	Lib	Lib	15,164	60.14%	6,223	24.68%	80.99%	15,164	8,941	–	1,111	–	–	–	–	25,216
Notre-Dame-de-Grâce	Lib	Eq	11,638	43.03%	2,090	7.73%	75.34%	9,548	3,017	11,638	2,024	388	–	234	198	27,047
Orford	Lib	Lib	17,236	57.48%	7,635	25.46%	74.18%	17,236	9,601	1,696	–	861	–	–	594	29,988
Outremont	Lib	Lib	11,774	49.90%	2,964	12.56%	76.19%	11,774	8,810	–	1,893	649	–	–	468	23,594
Papineau	Lib	Lib	11,313	50.68%	612	2.74%	72.31%	11,313	10,701	–	–	–	–	–	310	22,324
Pointe-aux-Trembles	New	PQ	13,725	50.41%	1,757	6.45%	74.56%	11,968	13,725	–	–	–	–	–	1,535	27,228
Pontiac	Lib	Lib	9,514	46.56%	5,890	28.82%	64.01%	9,514	3,624	6,259	–	956	–	–	81	20,434
Portneuf	Lib	Lib	17,768	70.70%	10,406	41.41%	78.17%	17,768	7,362	–	–	–	–	–	–	25,130
Prévost	Lib	Lib	17,676	55.36%	3,423	10.72%	75.11%	17,676	14,253	–	–	–	–	–	–	31,929
Richelieu	Lib	Lib	15,790	53.37%	3,288	11.11%	79.76%	15,790	12,502	–	–	–	–	1,296	–	29,588
Richmond	Lib	Lib	16,578	68.77%	10,319	42.80%	79.76%	16,578	6,259	506	555	–	–	–	210	24,108
Rimouski	Lib	Lib	16,019	56.29%	3,578	12.57%	72.93%	16,019	12,441	–	–	–	–	–	–	28,460
Rivière-du-Loup	Lib	Lib	11,317	54.48%	2,581	12.42%	74.55%	11,317	8,736	–	–	–	–	–	720	20,773
Robert-Baldwin	Lib	Lib	12,671	46.05%	9,114	33.12%	74.63%	12,671	3,557	11,287	–	–	–	–	–	27,515
Roberval	PQ	Lib	14,931	53.31%	2,507	8.95%	71.91%	14,931	12,424	–	–	–	–	–	651	28,006
Rosemont	Lib	Lib	13,121	46.97%	133	0.48%	75.57%	13,121	12,988	–	–	620	–	–	1,204	27,933
Rousseau	Lib	Lib	17,292	60.25%	5,882	20.49%	71.56%	17,292	11,410	–	–	–	–	–	–	28,702
Rouyn-Noranda–Témiscamingue	Lib	PQ	13,775	50.12%	66	0.24%	72.38%	13,709	13,775	–	–	–	–	–	–	27,484
Saguenay	Lib	Lib	9,273	43.45%	502	2.35%	64.78%	9,273	8,771	–	3,296	–	–	–	–	21,340
Saint-François	Lib	Lib	14,961	51.97%	4,469	15.52%	74.92%	14,961	10,492	1,881	–	884	–	–	568	28,786
Saint-Henri	Lib	Lib	10,765	47.07%	479	2.09%	70.50%	10,765	10,286	–	978	530	–	–	312	22,871
Saint-Hyacinthe	Lib	Lib	17,306	53.02%	3,350	10.26%	77.73%	17,306	13,956	–	–	1,381	–	–	–	32,643
Saint-Jean	Lib	Lib	19,412	53.63%	5,190	14.34%	78.11%	19,412	14,222	782	–	1,463	–	–	319	36,198
Saint-Laurent	Lib	Lib	15,493	52.13%	9,934	33.43%	74.06%	15,493	5,559	7,101	864	248	–	158	297	29,720
Saint-Louis	Lib	Lib	9,034	40.58%	2,375	10.67%	65.37%	9,034	6,659	3,815	1,804	457	–	133	358	22,260
Saint-Maurice	Lib	Lib	12,853	51.26%	2,439	9.73%	76.61%	12,853	10,414	–	1,805	–	–	–	–	25,072
Sainte-Anne	Lib	Lib	9,089	41.18%	1,112	5.04%	67.20%	9,089	7,977	3,057	941	218	–	347	443	22,072
Sainte-Marie–Saint-Jacques	New	PQ	15,489	55.29%	5,450	19.45%	70.25%	10,039	15,489	–	1,488	332	–	109	557	28,014
Salaberry-Soulanges	New	Lib	19,285	57.04%	4,763	14.09%	79.11%	19,285	14,522	–	–	–	–	–	–	33,807
Sauvé	Lib	Lib	14,091	58.44%	5,007	20.77%	70.97%	14,091	9,084	–	–	–	–	–	936	24,111
Shefford	PQ	PQ	19,984	56.88%	5,925	16.86%	79.52%	14,059	19,984	1,091	–	–	–	–	–	35,134
Sherbrooke	Lib	Lib	14,604	51.39%	3,314	11.66%	76.31%	14,604	11,290	–	1,578	521	–	–	424	28,417
Taillon	PQ	PQ	18,983	55.92%	6,421	18.91%	74.83%	12,562	18,983	–	1,362	508	–	–	534	33,949
Taschereau	Lib	Lib	10,176	50.44%	1,435	7.11%	74.05%	10,176	8,741	–	–	1,258	–	–	–	20,175
Terrebonne	PQ	PQ	15,693	52.03%	2,940	9.75%	75.84%	12,753	15,693	–	1,714	–	–	–	–	30,160
Trois-Rivières	Lib	Lib	15,181	54.53%	3,562	12.79%	75.41%	15,181	11,619	–	–	413	–	412	216	27,841
Ungava	PQ	PQ	6,442	50.96%	243	1.92%	51.68%	6,199	6,442	–	–	–	–	–	–	12,641
Vachon	Lib	Lib	15,468	45.50%	114	0.34%	73.76%	15,468	15,354	–	1,216	620	–	979	361	33,998
Vanier	Lib	Lib	16,650	54.15%	4,814	15.66%	74.10%	16,650	11,836	–	–	1,131	–	962	169	30,748
Vaudreuil	New	Lib	16,146	51.40%	5,671	18.05%	76.75%	16,146	10,475	2,852	1,766	–	–	–	171	31,410
Verchères	PQ	PQ	16,651	47.76%	699	2.01%	78.98%	15,952	16,651	–	–	–	–	1,100	1,158	34,861
Verdun	Lib	Lib	8,295	38.58%	1,367	6.36%	75.20%	8,295	6,928	4,857	664	387	–	–	372	21,503
Viau	Lib	Lib	13,965	61.48%	6,781	29.85%	69.07%	13,965	7,184	–	–	954	–	–	613	22,716
Viger	Lib	Lib	16,847	60.73%	8,772	31.62%	76.21%	16,847	8,075	1,831	877	–	–	–	111	27,741
Vimont	Lib	Lib	17,650	48.48%	583	1.60%	78.02%	17,650	17,067	–	–	1,138	–	–	553	36,408
Westmount	Lib	Eq	8,801	40.64%	513	2.37%	73.41%	8,288	2,376	8,801	1,620	430	–	–	143	21,658

= open seat
= turnout is above provincial average
= winning candidate was in previous Legislature
= incumbent had switched allegiance
= previously incumbent in another riding
= not incumbent; was previously elected to the Legislature
= incumbency arose from byelection gain
= other incumbents renominated
= previously an MP in the House of Commons of Canada
= Unity Party candidates
= multiple candidates

=== Analysis ===
Party candidates in 2nd place
Party in 1st place	Party in 2nd place				Total
Party in 1st place	Lib	PQ	Eq	Un	Total
Liberal		86	5	1	92
Parti Québécois	29				29
Equality	4				4
Total	33	86	5	1	125

Candidates ranked 1st to 5th place, by party
Parties	1st	2nd	3rd	4th	5th
█ Liberal	92	33			
█ Parti Québécois	29	86	10		
█ Equality	4	5	10		
█ Unity		1	12	3	
█ Green			32	14	
█ New Democratic			20	23	10
█ Independent			6	10	3
█ Green			4	22	11
█ Lemon			3	3	4
█ Workers			3	2	7
█ Independent			2	7	6
█ Socialist Movement			2	2	1
█ Marxist–Leninist			2	1	9
█ Progressive Conservative			1	5	2
█ United Social Credit			1	2	4
█ Ind-PQ			1		
█ Parti indépendantiste				6	3
█ Parti 51				2	8
█ Commonwealth of Canada				1	2
█ Communist					1

Resulting composition of the 31st Quebec Legislative Assembly
Source		Party			
Source		Lib	PQ	Eq	Total
Seats retained	Incumbents returned	70	14		84
Seats retained	Open seats held	16	6		22
Seats changing hands	Incumbents defeated		4	2	6
Seats changing hands	Open seats gained			2	2
Seats changing hands	Byelection gains held	2			2
New seats	New MNAs	1	3		4
New seats	Previously incumbent in another riding	3	2		
Total		92	29	4	125

== See also ==
- List of Quebec premiers
- Politics of Quebec
- Timeline of Quebec history
- 34th National Assembly of Quebec
