= John Clennett =

Australian rules footballer

Personal information
- Born: 25 January 1950 (age 76)
- Original team: Hutchins Old Boys
- Height: 194 cm (6 ft 4 in)
- Weight: 85.5 kg (188 lb)
- Position: Ruck

Playing career^{1}
Years	Club	Games (Goals)
1972–74	Melbourne	39 (22)
- ^{1} Playing statistics correct to the end of 1974.

John Clennett (born 25 January 1950) is a former Australian rules footballer who played with Melbourne in the Victorian Football League (VFL).
