= NOWAR-PAIX =

Network to Oppose War and Racism
- Abbreviation: NOWAR
- Formation: 2002
- Type: Peace organization based in Canada
- Legal status: active
- Purpose: advocate and public voice, educator and network
- Headquarters: Ottawa, Ontario, Canada
- Region served: Canada
- Official language: English, French
- Website: www.nowar-paix.ca

NOWAR-PAIX is an anti-war and anti-racist organization based in Ottawa, Ontario, Canada. The group's full name is "Network to Oppose War and Racism – Pacte contre l'Agression, l'Intolérance et la Xénophobie", which form the acronyms "no war" and "paix," which is French for "peace".

The group was formed in response to the terrorist attacks of September 11, 2001, and the subsequent military actions of the United States of America and its allies. NOWAR-PAIX's website indicates that it opposes Canada's current military presence in Afghanistan, government attacks on civil liberties, and ongoing racist and xenophobic attacks across North America.

== History ==
NOWAR-PAIX emerged in 2002, during the buildup to the 2003 American-led invasion of Iraq. Its website featured news updates on rallies and petitions during the war itself, and the Ottawa Citizen described it as one of the two main sites of the Canadian peace movement in this period.

In 2004, NOWAR-PAIX attracted attention for its role in organizing anti-war demonstrations at the Republican National Convention in New York City. Later in the same year, the group protested against an Ottawa visit by United States president George W. Bush. In March 2007, NOWAR-PAIX took part in a global protest against the continuing war in Iraq.

The Canadian Security Intelligence Service (CSIS) issued an internal report entitled The Creation of a New Peace Movement? in January 2005, hypothesizing that the emergence of NOWAR-PAIX and related groups marked a shift in Canadian protest culture from anti-capitalism to a new anti-war movement. Parts of this document were issued to the Canadian Press in March 2005, following an access to information request.

In 2007, NOWAR-PAIX argued that undercover police officers had been used as agents provocateurs to discredit protestors at the North American Leaders' Summit in Montebello, Quebec. NOWAR-PAIX leaders have called for their demonstrations to be peaceful and have condemned acts of violence by attendees.
