= Aimé Guertin =

Canadian politician (1898–1970)

Aimé Guertin (June 7, 1898 – June 8, 1970) was a Canadian business owner and politician in Quebec. He represented Hull in the Legislative Assembly of Quebec from 1927 to 1934 as a Conservative.

The son of Thimoté Guertin, a merchant, and Lina Bélanger, he was born in Aylmer, Quebec and was educated there. In 1915, Guertin travelled in northwestern Canada. In the following year, he began work as a telegraph operator for the Canadian Pacific Railway. He later was an insurance broker and operated his own travel agency and furniture store. Guertin was founding president of the Union des chambres de commerce de l'Ouest du Québec from 1940 to 1949. He was vice-president of the Quebec Association des courtiers d'assurances from 1941 to 1956 and was also president of the industrial commission for Hull. Guertin was executive vice-president for the National Capital Commission from 1959 to 1964.

He was elected to the Quebec assembly in 1927 and was reelected in 1931. Guertin served as party whip from 1928 to 1931. He was expelled from the party caucus in December 1934 and sat as an independent. He resigned his seat in October 1935 to run unsuccessfully for the Hull seat in the Canadian House of Commons as a Reconstruction Party of Canada candidate.

In 1921, he married Aline Tremblay.

Guertin died in Hull at the age of 72 and was buried in Aylmer.

Rue Aimé in Gatineau was named in his honour.
