= Commission de la représentation électorale =

The Commission de la représentation électorale du Québec (English: Electoral Representation Commission) is the permanent and independent agency in Quebec with decision-making authority to periodically revise the electoral map, usually as a consequence of population shifts, in order to ensure equitable representation.

The commission consists of three persons, with the Chief Electoral Officer of Quebec as its president.
