= Lemon Party =

Lemon Party of Canada Parti Citron du Canada
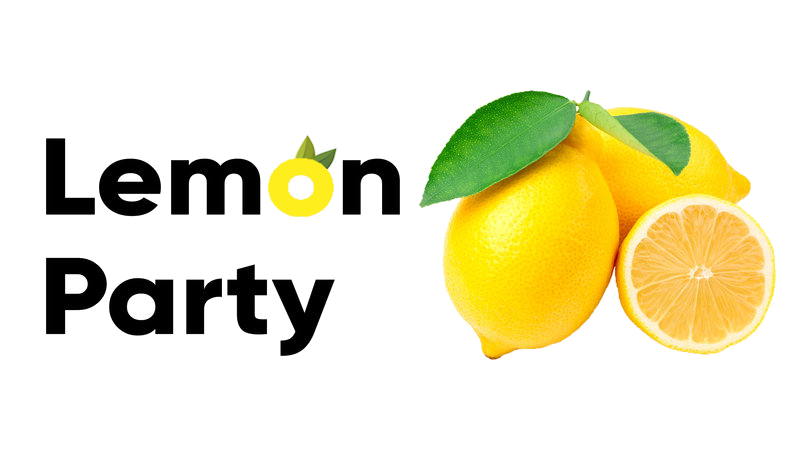
- Leader: Pope Terence I
- Spokesperson: Mary-Gabrielle Blay II
- Founder: Denis R. Patenaude
- Founded: January 8, 1987
- Ideology: Political satire
- Colours: Yellow
- Slogan: "For a bitter Canada"

The Lemon Party of Canada (French: Parti Citron du Canada) was a frivolous political party in Canada that ran candidates at the federal level, as well as provincially in Quebec. The party was registered on January 8, 1987, by then-leader Denis R. Patenaude, and deregistered on November 14, 1998 for failing to have at least ten candidates stand for election. The party was headed by "Pope Terence the First", whose existence is unconfirmed. According to Jean-Simon Poirier, Terence is "sort of a mystical, mythical person" who doesn't spend much time in Canada. "The interesting thing about him is he's never in the country. He's always touring around other countries," he said, adding that at present Terence was visiting southwestern Siberia. Their official agent was Mary-Gabrielle Blay II.

Its 2004 national convention produced a platform of policies which were "Placed in small green plastic boxes and sold to industrial pig farms in Mexico", according to a large party spokeswoman. The subsequent electoral campaign, under the slogan "For a bitter Canada", received minor, but sympathetic, media coverage. Its last press release was published online five days prior to the 2006 Canadian elections, ridiculing both Liberal Paul Martin and Conservative Stephen Harper. The Lemon Party prided itself on its record on fiscal discipline and in pushing for economic growth. Its economic plan was allegedly authored by Montreal economist Ianik Marcil. Members of the Lemon Party refer to themselves as "lemonistas" and "lemons".

The Lemon Party has not been registered as a political party since the early 1990s, when it was registered only in Quebec. They were going to be re-registered in 2004 although they missed the deadline by two days. A member of the party (Jean-Simon Poirier) admitted that the party had only itself to blame for the predicament. "We're not very organized. We're like Liberals," he said.

== Policies and platforms ==
The Lemon Party pledged to:

- Restructure Canada's economy to be centred on lemon production
- Support global warming (so lemons can be grown in Canada)
- Abolish Toronto (to "capitalize on the prejudices of voters outside the city")
- Repeal the law of gravity (to avoid lemons being bruised when falling from trees)
- Merge the Great Lakes (so that water is provided to more land, some of which could potentially be lemon farms)

== Slogans and quotes from party members ==
- "For a bitter Canada"
- "We think there should be more zest in Canadian politics"
- "The growth of lemon consumption and lemon importation over the last 40 years is absolutely staggering"
- "Climate change is an important part of the Lemon Party platform...We think Canada ought to be warm enough to grow lemon trees."
- "I don't believe that the federal government has any business interfering in the laws of physics or thermodynamics. It's not a federal jurisdiction"
- "A lot of silly people vote for the Conservatives and a lot of silly people vote for us. And if we just joined together, we could keep the silly vote together and win"

== Election results ==
General election	# of candidates	# of seats won	% of popular vote
1989	11	0	0.22%
1994	10	0	0.10%

== See also ==
- Novelty candidate
- List of frivolous political parties
- Politics of Quebec
- Political parties in Quebec
- List of political parties in Canada
