= Parti Indépendantiste =

Political party in Quebec, Canada

The Parti indépendantiste (French pronunciation: [paʁti ɛ̃depɑ̃dɑ̃tist], PI; English: Independence Party) was a political party promoting the independence of Quebec from Canada.

== History ==
The party was founded in 2007 by Éric Tremblay and Richard Gervais, in the aftermath of the Parti Québécois's defeat in the 2007 Quebec election. It was registered as an official political party by the Chief Electoral Officer of Quebec on October 18, 2007. Candidates ran in three by-elections in Bourget, Hull, and Pointe-aux-Trembles held on May 12, 2008. Party founder Richard Gervais, running in Bourget, received 376 votes (2.33%), finishing sixth out of six candidates.

In the December 2008 provincial election, the party nominated 19 candidates, who won a total of 4,227 votes, or 0.13% of the provincial total.

On November 24, 2011 at Université du Québec à Montréal, a debate between independentist parties included the Parti Québécois, Quebec solidaire and Option nationale, but excluded PI.

In the 2012 provincial election, the party nominated ten candidates, who won a total of 1,244 votes, or 0.03% of the provincial total.

In the 2014 provincial election, the party nominated one candidate, party leader Michel Lepage, who won 126 votes in Borduas riding.

In 2017, The party ran in the Gouin provincial by-election with Alexandre Cormier-Denis as its candidate. During that by election The party had a poster campaign poster where it had two women, one with a toque and another one with a niqab and asks people to “choose their Quebec.” Some people called the poster racist. Alexandre Cormier-Denis was 7th placed out of 13 in the by election.

== Beliefs ==
According to former leader Éric Tremblay, the Parti Québécois has given up the will to actively seek the sovereignty of Quebec. Tremblay considers that, if given a majority of seats at the National Assembly of Quebec, the Parti indépendantiste would have clear mandate to achieve sovereignty, even if it receives less than 50% of the popular vote. Tremblay did not hide his intention to put an end to all public financing of English-language schools and hospitals come his election, even though he would offer unilingual English-speakers health care in their language. The party suggests a reduction of more than half of the number of immigrants admitted, which would be reduced to 20,000, and the selection of immigrants based on the knowledge of French.

== Leadership and support ==
Éric Tremblay was the leader from 2008 to 2011, and the leader since 2011 has been Michel Lepage. According to the Chief Electoral Officer of Quebec, donations were $33792 in 2008 and then fell sharply in 2009 and 2010. Prominent supporters have included:

- Author Victor-Lévy Beaulieu, a disillusioned Parti Québécois supporter, voted for the Action démocratique du Québec (ADQ) in protest in the 2007 Quebec election, but has become disappointed with the party. He announced on April 15, 2008 his intention to run for the Parti Indépendantiste in the district of Rivière-du-Loup against ADQ leader Mario Dumont.
- Former Bloc Québécois Member of Parliament Ghislain Lebel announced on April 30, 2008 that he would be a Parti indépendantiste candidate.
- Comedian Ghislain Taschereau left the party and became a member of the defunct Option nationale (ON) party.
- Alexandre Cormier-Denis, candidate for the party in the 2017 Gouin provincial by-election and the founding President of Horizon Québec Actuel.

=== Links to neo-Nazis ===
The Parti indépendantiste has been criticised for having links with neo-Nazis. For example, a neo-Nazi skinhead was the president of the executive committee for the region of Quebec and a member of the neo-Nazi group Blood & Honour is the treasurer. The Parti Indépendantiste was present at a racist protest organized at Montreal in November 2011 with other well-known neo-Nazi groups. The party has been compared to the French National Front because it recruited a fascist. An article published in the newspaper Le Soleil accused the Parti Indépendantiste of being "authentic reactionary racist", and another article by the same newspaper reported that a neo-Nazi was in the hierarchy of the party.

== Election results ==
Election	Leader	Seats contested	Seats won	+/-	Votes	%	Rank	Status/Gov.
2008	Éric Tremblay	19 / 125	0 / 125	Steady	4,227	0.13%	6th out of 9	Extra-parliamentary
2012	Michel Lepage	10 / 125	0 / 125	Steady	1,244	0.03	14th out of 18	Extra-parliamentary
2014	Michel Lepage	1 / 125	0 / 125	Steady	126	0.00%	17th out of 18	Extra-parliamentary

== See also ==
- Politics of Quebec
- List of Quebec general elections
- List of Quebec premiers
- List of Quebec leaders of the Opposition
- National Assembly of Quebec
- Timeline of Quebec history
- Political parties in Quebec
- Secessionist movements of Canada
