= Unity Party (Quebec) =

Former Canadian political party

The Unity Party (in French, Parti unité) was a political party in Quebec, Canada.

The party was formed as a reaction to then-Premier Robert Bourassa invoking the notwithstanding clause of the Canadian constitution to override a Supreme Court ruling overturning parts of the Charter of the French Language (commonly known as "Bill 101").

The party platform called for equality of both languages (French and English) in Quebec, opposing Bill 101 which made French the sole official language of Quebec and imposed restrictions on the use of English on public signs. The Unity Party drew virtually all of its support from elements of Quebec's anglophone minority, and only ran candidates in electoral districts with very high anglophone populations outside the Montreal Island and Laval, while its twin party, the Equality Party, ran candidates exclusively on the Montreal Island and Laval. The Equality Party won four seats in the National Assembly in the 1989 general election.

The Unity Party merged with the Equality Party in September 1990.

== Election results ==
General election	# of candidates	# of elected candidates	% of popular vote
1989	16	0	0.99%

== See also ==
- Politics of Quebec
- List of Quebec general elections
- List of Quebec premiers
- List of Quebec leaders of the Opposition
- National Assembly of Quebec
- Timeline of Quebec history
- Political parties in Quebec
