= Shawinigan Handshake =

Chokehold made by the Canadian prime minister

Chrétien grasping Clennett with the Shawinigan Handshake

Shawinigan Handshake is the epithet given to a chokehold executed on February 15, 1996, by Jean Chrétien, then–Prime Minister of Canada, on anti-poverty protester Bill Clennett. The phrase comes from Chrétien's birthplace of Shawinigan, Quebec, as he often styled himself the "little guy from Shawinigan".

== Incident ==
Jean Chrétien was in Hull, Quebec, to commemorate the first National Flag of Canada Day. As Chrétien addressed the assembled crowd, anti-poverty activists heckled the Prime Minister over proposed changes to Canada's unemployment insurance program, and, as he made his way to his limousine at the cessation of the ceremonies, Chrétien was confronted by Bill Clennett. At that moment, Chrétien grabbed Clennett by the back of the neck and chin, forcing Clennett to the ground and breaking one of his teeth. Another protester who then blocked Chrétien's passage had his megaphone knocked away by the Prime Minister, and was promptly pushed to the ground by Royal Canadian Mounted Police (RCMP) officers.

Chrétien later defended these actions, stating: "some people came my way ... and I had to go, so if you're in my way ..." He also blamed the RCMP for allowing Clennett to obtain such close proximity to the Prime Minister, though the RCMP said they saw no breach of security.

Reform Party Member of Parliament Deborah Grey subsequently nicknamed Chrétien "The Shawinigan Strangler". This sobriquet was later used by other opposition MPs as well; in a member's statement on February 12, 1997, Chuck Strahl sarcastically nominated Chrétien for a "Parliamentary Oscar" for his "performance" in The Shawinigan Strangler.

While Clennett did not press charges against the Prime Minister, another person, Kenneth Russell, did accuse Chrétien of assault on March 28, and the Prime Minister was formally charged by a judge in the Quebec Superior Court. These charges, however, were rejected by the Attorney General of Quebec.

== Aftermath and legacy ==
In his 2007 autobiography, Chrétien described his reaction to Clennett's approach as stemming in part from the trauma of the November 5, 1995 assassination attempt by André Dallaire: "my reaction was instinctive and probably angrier than it would have been otherwise".

Bill Clennett later stood as a Québec solidaire candidate for the National Assembly of Quebec in the riding of Hull, but ended his political career after 4 unsuccessful attempts.

The epithet and incident remain enduring popular local lore in Shawinigan, decades after the incident. Following the incident, popular Canadian TV sports personality Don Cherry commented that he liked politicians being direct in this manner, and the performance of Chrétien in particular. Shawinigan microbrewery Trou du Diable has released an award-winning beer named "Shawinigan Handshake" with Prime Minister Jean Chrétien strangling Cherry on its label, in honour of the local lore. Since the incident, many celebrities and politicians have been jokingly held by Chrétien in the famous chokehold, when visiting him in Shawinigan. These include Cherry, politician Michael Ignatieff, comedian Rick Mercer, and Prime Minister Justin Trudeau.
