= Marxist–Leninist Party of Quebec =

Provincial political party in Canada

Marxist–Leninist Party of Quebec Parti marxiste–léniniste du Québec
- Abbreviation: PMLQ
- Leader: Christine Dandenault (interim)
- Headquarters: 1360, rue Ontario Est, Montreal, Quebec; H2L 1S1
- Ideology: Communism; Marxism–Leninism; Anti-revisionism; Quebec sovereigntism
- Political position: Far-left
- National affiliation: Communist Party of Canada (Marxist–Leninist)
- Colours: Green, white, red
- Seats in the National Assembly: 0 / 127

Website
- www.pmlq.qc.ca

The Marxist–Leninist Party of Quebec (French: Parti marxiste–léniniste du Québec, PMLQ) is a Marxist–Leninist and sovereigntist communist party in Quebec, Canada. The PMLQ is the Quebec branch of the anti-revisionist Communist Party of Canada (Marxist–Leninist). It has run candidates in Quebec general elections in 1973, 1981 and since 1989 under various names: Parti communiste du Québec (marxiste-léniniste), Parti marxiste-léniniste (Québec) and Parti marxiste-léniniste du Québec.

== Election results ==
General election results of the PMLQ
Election	Candidates	Votes	%	Ref.
1973 (Note: As Parti communiste du Québec (marxiste-léniniste).)	15	1,395	0.05	
1976	No candidates nominated			
1981 (Note: As Parti marxiste-léniniste (Québec).)	40	3,178	0.09	
1985	No candidates nominated			
1989	30	4,245	0.12	
1994	13	1,171	0.03	
1998	24	2,747	0.07	
2003	23	2,749	0.07	
2007	24	2,091	0.05	
2008	23	2,727	0.08	
2012	25	1,969	0.05	
2014	24	2,016	0.05	
2018	25	1,708	0.04	
2022	12	675	0.02	
2026	12	729	0.02	
