= 35th Quebec Legislature =

Legislature in Quebec, Canada from 1994 to 1998

The 35th National Assembly of Quebec was the provincial legislature in Quebec, Canada that was elected in the 1994 Quebec general election and sat from November 29, 1994, to March 13, 1996, and from March 25, 1996, to October 21, 1998. The Parti Québécois led by Jacques Parizeau and Lucien Bouchard were in power during this mandate. Jacques Parizeau resigned after the 1995 Quebec sovereignty referendum which resulted in a narrow victory for the "no" side, and Bouchard succeeded him as PQ leader and Premier in 1996.

== Seats per political party ==
- After the 1994 elections

Affiliation	Members
Parti Québécois	77
Parti libéral du Québec	47
Action démocratique du Québec	1
Total	125
Government Majority	29

== Member list ==
This was the list of members of the National Assembly of Quebec that were elected in the 1994 election:

Name	Party	Riding	First elected / previously elected	No. of terms
André Pelletier	Parti Québécois	Abitibi-Est	1994	1st term
François Gendron	Parti Québécois	Abitibi-Ouest	1976	5th term
Yvan Bordeleau	Libéral	Acadie	1989	2nd term
Pierre Bélanger	Parti Québécois	Anjou	1992	2nd term
Régent L. Beaudet	Libéral	Argenteuil	1994	1st term
David Whissell (1998)	Libéral	Argenteuil	1998	1st term
Jacques Baril	Parti Québécois	Arthabaska	1976, 1989	4th term*
Normand Poulin	Libéral	Beauce-Nord	1994	1st term
Paul-Eugène Quirion	Libéral	Beauce-Sud	1994	1st term
Diane Leblanc (1997)	Libéral	Beauce-Sud	1997	1st term
André Chenail	Libéral	Beauharnois-Huntingdon	1989	2nd term
Claude Lachance	Parti Québécois	Bellechasse	1981, 1994	2nd term*
Gilles Baril	Parti Québécois	Berthier	1981, (Note: Rouyn-Noranda–Témiscamingue) 1994	2nd term*
Robert Therien	Libéral	Bertrand	1985	3rd term
Denis Chalifoux (1997)	Libéral	Bertrand	1997	1st term
Céline Signori	Parti Québécois	Blainville	1994	1st term
Marcel Landry	Parti Québécois	Bonaventure	1994	2nd term
Jean-Pierre Charbonneau	Parti Québécois	Borduas	1976, (Note: Verchères) 1994	4th term*
Yvon Charbonneau	Libéral	Bourassa	1994	1st term
Michèle Lamquin-Éthier (1997)	Libéral	Bourassa	1997	1st term
Camille Laurin	Parti Québécois	Bourget	1970, 1976, 1994	4th term*
Pierre Paradis	Libéral	Brome-Missisquoi	1980	5th term
Louise Beaudoin	Parti Québécois	Chambly	1994	1st term
Yves Beaumier	Parti Québécois	Champlain	1981, (Note: Nicolet) 1994	2nd term*
Claire Vaive	Libéral	Chapleau	1994	1st term
Jean Rochon	Parti Québécois	Charlesbourg	1994	1st term
Rosaire Bertrand	Parti Québécois	Charlevoix	1994	1st term
Jean-Marc Fournier	Libéral	Châteauguay	1994	1st term
Raymond Brouillet	Parti Québécois	Chauveau	1981, 1994	2nd term*
Jeanne L. Blackburn	Parti Québécois	Chicoutimi	1985	3rd term
Thomas J. Mulcair	Libéral	Chomedey	1994	1st term
Denise Carrier-Perreault	Parti Québécois	Chutes-de-la-Chaudière	1989	2nd term
Jean Campeau	Parti Québécois	Crémazie	1994	1st term
Lawrence Bergman	Libéral	D'Arcy-McGee	1994	1st term
Hélène Robert	Parti Québécois	Deux-Montagnes	1994	1st term
Normand Jutras	Parti Québécois	Drummond	1994	1st term
Gérard-Raymond Morin	Parti Québécois	Dubuc	1989	2nd term
Denis Perron	Parti Québécois	Duplessis	1976	5th term
Normand Duguay (1997)	Parti Québécois	Duplessis	1997	1st term
Joseph Facal	Parti Québécois	Fabre	1994	1st term
Roger Lefebvre	Libéral	Frontenac	1985	3rd term
Guy Lelièvre	Parti Québécois	Gaspé	1994	1st term
Réjean Lafrenière	Libéral	Gatineau	1989	2nd term
André Boisclair	Parti Québécois	Gouin	1989	2nd term
Robert Kieffer	Parti Québécois	Groulx	1994	1st term
Louise Harel	Parti Québécois	Hochelaga-Maisonneuve	1981	4th term
Robert Lesage	Libéral	Hull	1989	2nd term
Richard Le Hir	Parti Québécois	Iberville	1994	1st term
Richard Le Hir	Independent	Iberville	1994	1st term
Georges Farrah	Libéral	Îles-de-la-Madeleine	1985	3rd term
Geoffrey Kelley	Libéral	Jacques-Cartier	1994	1st term
Michel Bissonnet	Libéral	Jeanne-Mance	1981	4th term
Margaret F. Delisle	Libéral	Jean-Talon	1994	1st term
Claude Boucher	Parti Québécois	Johnson	1994	1st term
Guy Chevrette	Parti Québécois	Joliette	1976	5th term
Francis Dufour	Parti Québécois	Jonquière	1985	3rd term
Lucien Bouchard (1996)	Parti Québécois	Jonquière	1996	1st term
France Dionne	Libéral	Kamouraska-Témiscouata	1985	3rd term
Claude Béchard (1997)	Libéral	Kamouraska-Témiscouata	1997	1st term
Jacques Léonard	Parti Québécois	Labelle	1976, 1989	4th term*
Jacques Brassard	Parti Québécois	Lac-Saint-Jean	1976	5th term
Jean-Claude Gobé	Libéral	LaFontaine	1985	3rd term
Michel Côté	Parti Québécois	La Peltrie	1994	1st term
Fatima Houda-Pepin	Libéral	La Pinière	1994	1st term
André Bourbeau	Libéral	Laporte	1981	4th term
Denis Lazure	Parti Québécois	La Prairie	1976, (Note: Chambly) 1989	4th term*
Monique Simard (1996)	Parti Québécois	La Prairie	1996	1st term
Monique Simard (1996)	Independent	La Prairie	1996	1st term
Monique Simard (1996)	Parti Québécois	La Prairie	1996	1st term
Jacques Parizeau	Parti Québécois	L'Assomption	1976, 1989	4th term*
Jean-Claude St-André (1996)	Parti Québécois	L'Assomption	1996	1st term
Christos Sirros	Libéral	Laurier-Dorion	1981	4th term
Serge Ménard	Parti Québécois	Laval-des-Rapides	1993	2nd term
Jean-Pierre Jolivet	Parti Québécois	Laviolette	1976	5th term
Jean Garon	Parti Québécois	Lévis	1976	5th term
Michel Rivard	Parti Québécois	Limoilou	1994	1st term
Jean-Guy Paré	Parti Québécois	Lotbinière	1994	1st term
Paul Bégin	Parti Québécois	Louis-Hébert	1994	1st term
Liza Frulla	Libéral	Marguerite-Bourgeoys	1989	2nd term
François Beaulne	Parti Québécois	Marguerite-D'Youville	1989	2nd term
Cécile Vermette	Parti Québécois	Marie-Victorin	1985	3rd term
François Ouimet	Libéral	Marquette	1994	1st term
Rémy Désilets	Parti Québécois	Maskinongé	1994	1st term
Yves Blais	Parti Québécois	Masson	1981	4th term
Matthias Rioux	Parti Québécois	Matane	1994	1st term
Danielle Doyer	Parti Québécois	Matapédia	1994	1st term
Madeleine Bélanger	Libéral	Mégantic-Compton	1983	4th term
Robert Perreault	Parti Québécois	Mercier	1994	1st term
Lyse Leduc	Parti Québécois	Mille-Îles	1994	1st term
Réal Gauvin	Libéral	Montmagny-L'Islet	1985	3rd term
Jean Filion	Parti Québécois	Montmorency	1991	2nd term
Jean Filion	Independent	Montmorency	1991	2nd term
John Ciaccia	Libéral	Mont-Royal	1973	6th term
Russell Williams	Libéral	Nelligan	1989	2nd term
Michel Morin	Parti Québécois	Nicolet-Yamaska	1994	1st term
Russell Copeman	Libéral	Notre-Dame-de-Grâce	1994	1st term
Robert Benoit	Libéral	Orford	1989	2nd term
Gérald Tremblay	Libéral	Outremont	1989	2nd term
Pierre-Étienne Laporte (1996)	Libéral	Outremont	1996	1st term
Norman MacMillan	Libéral	Papineau	1989	2nd term
Michel Bourdon	Parti Québécois	Pointe-aux-Trembles	1989	2nd term
Nicole Léger (1996)	Parti Québécois	Pointe-aux-Trembles	1996	1st term
Robert Middlemiss	Libéral	Pontiac	1981	4th term
Roger Bertrand	Parti Québécois	Portneuf	1993	2nd term
Daniel Paillé	Parti Québécois	Prévost	1994	1st term
Lucie Papineau (1997)	Parti Québécois	Prévost	1997	1st term
Sylvain Simard	Parti Québécois	Richelieu	1994	1st term
Yvon Vallières	Libéral	Richmond	1973, 1981	5th term*
Solange Charest	Parti Québécois	Rimouski	1994	1st term
Mario Dumont	ADQ	Rivière-du-Loup	1994	1st term
Pierre Marsan	Libéral	Robert-Baldwin	1994	1st term
Benoît Laprise	Parti Québécois	Roberval	1994	1st term
Rita Dionne-Marsolais	Parti Québécois	Rosemont	1994	1st term
Lévis Brien	Parti Québécois	Rousseau	1994	1st term
Rémy Trudel	Parti Québécois	Rouyn-Noranda–Témiscamingue	1989	2nd term
Gabriel-Yvan Gagnon	Parti Québécois	Saguenay	1994	1st term
Monique Gagnon-Tremblay	Libéral	Saint-François	1985	3rd term
Nicole Loiselle	Libéral	Saint-Henri–Sainte-Anne	1989	2nd term
Léandre Dion	Parti Québécois	Saint-Hyacinthe	1994	1st term
Roger Paquin (elected on October 24, 1994)	Parti Québécois	Saint-Jean	1994	1st term
Normand Cherry	Libéral	Saint-Laurent	1989	2nd term
André Boulerice	Parti Québécois	Sainte-Marie–Saint-Jacques	1985	3rd term
Claude Pinard	Parti Québécois	Saint-Maurice	1994	1st term
Serge Deslières	Parti Québécois	Salaberry-Soulanges	1994	1st term
Marcel Parent	Libéral	Sauvé	1984	4th term
Bernard Brodeur	Libéral	Shefford	1994	2nd term
Marie Malavoy	Parti Québécois	Sherbrooke	1994	1st term
Pauline Marois	Parti Québécois	Taillon	1981, (Note: La Peltrie) 1989	3rd term*
André Gaulin	Parti Québécois	Taschereau	1994	1st term
Jocelyne Caron	Parti Québécois	Terrebonne	1989	2nd term
Guy Julien	Parti Québécois	Trois-Rivières	1994	1st term
Michel Létourneau	Parti Québécois	Ungava	1994	1st term
David Payne	Parti Québécois	Vachon	1981, 1994	2nd term*
Diane Barbeau	Parti Québécois	Vanier	1994	1st term
Daniel Johnson Jr.	Libéral	Vaudreuil	1981	4th term
Bernard Landry	Parti Québécois	Verchères	1976, (Note: Fabre) 1994	4th term*
Henri-François Gautrin	Libéral	Verdun	1989	2nd term
William Cusano	Libéral	Viau	1981	4th term
Cosmo Maciocia	Libéral	Viger	1981	4th term
David Cliche	Parti Québécois	Vimont	1994	1st term
Jacques Chagnon	Libéral	Westmount–Saint-Louis	1985	3rd term

== Other elected MNAs ==
Other MNAs were elected in by-elections during this mandate

- Lucien Bouchard, Parti Québécois, Jonquière, February 19, 1996
- Monique Simard, Parti Québécois, La Prairie, February 19, 1996
- Jean-Claude St-André, Parti Québécois, L'Assomption, June 10, 1996
- Pierre-Étienne Laporte, Quebec Liberal Party, June 10, 1996
- Nicole Léger, Parti Québécois, Pointe-aux-Trembles, December 9, 1996
- Diane Leblanc, Quebec Liberal Party, Beauce-Sud, April 28, 1997
- Lucie Papineau, Parti Québécois, Prévost, April 28, 1997
- Denis Chalifoux, Quebec Liberal Party, Bertrand, October 6, 1997
- Michèle Lamquin-Éthier, Quebec Liberal Party, Bourassa, October 6, 1997
- Normand Duguay, Parti Québécois, Duplessis, October 6, 1997
- Claude Béchard, Quebec Liberal Party, Kamouraska-Témiscouata, October 6, 1997
- David Whissell, Quebec Liberal Party, Argenteuil, June 1, 1998

== Cabinet Ministers ==
=== Parizeau Cabinet (1994–1996) ===
- Prime Minister and Executive Council President: Jacques Parizeau
- Deputy Premier: Bernard Landry
- Agriculture, Fisheries and Food: Marcel Landry
- Income Security: Jeanne Blackburn
- Concerted Action and Employment: Louise Harel
- President of the Treasury Board, Administration and Public Office: Pauline Marois (1994–1995), Jacques Léonard (1995–1996)
- Culture and Communications: Marie Malavoy (1994), Rita Dionne-Marsolais (1994–1995), Jacques Parizeau (1995), Louise Beaudoin (1995–1996)
- International Affairs, Cultural Communities and Immigration: Bernard Landry (1994–1995)
  - Cultural Communities and Immigration: Louise Harel (1995–1996)
  - International Affairs: Bernard Landry (1995–1996)
- Health and Social Services: Jean Rochon
- Education: Jean Garon
- Transportation: Jacques Léonard (1994–1995), Jean Campeau (1995–1996)
- Canadian Intergovernmental Affairs: Louise Beaudoin
- Municipal Affairs & Region Development: Guy Chevrette
- Tourism: Rita Dionne-Marsolais
- Environment and Wildlife: Jacques Brassard
- Natural Resources: François Gendron
- Justice: Paul Bégin
- Public Safety: Serge Ménard
- Finances and Revenue: Jean Campeau (1994–1995), Pauline Marois (1995–1996)
- Industry, Commerce, Science and Technology: Daniel Paillé
- Restructuration: Richard Le Hir (1994–1995)

=== Bouchard Cabinet (1996–1998) ===
- Prime Minister and Executive Council President: Lucien Bouchard
- Deputy Premier and Vice-President of the Executive Council: Bernard Landry
- Agriculture, Fisheries and Food: Guy Julien
- Income Security: Louise Harel (1996)
  - Employment and Solidarity: Louise Harel (1996–1998)
- Labor: Mathias Rioux
- President of the Treasury Board, Administration and Public Office: Jacques Léonard
- Culture and Communications: Louise Beaudoin
- International Relations: Sylvain Simard
- Indian Affairs: Guy Cheverette
- Health and Social Services: Jean Rochon
- Education: Pauline Marois
- Family and Children: Pauline Marois (1997–1998), Nicole Léger (1998)
- Transportation: Jacques Brassard
- Canadian Intergovernmental Affairs: Jacques Brassard (1996–1998), Joseph Facal (1998)
- Municipal Affairs: Rémy Trudel
- Relations with the Citizens: André Boisclair (1996)
  - Relations with the Citizens and Immigration: André Boisclair (1996–1998)
- Metropole: Serge Ménard (1996–1997), Robert Perreault (1997–1998)
- Tourism: David Cliche (1997–1998)
- Environment and Wildlife: David Cliche (1996–1997), Paul Bégin (1997–1998)
- Natural Resources: Guy Chevrette
- Mines, Lands and Forest: Denise Carrier-Perreault (1996–1998)
  - Mines and Lands: Denis Carrier-Perreault (1998)
  - Regional Development and Forests: Jean-Pierre Jolivet (1998)
- Regions: Guy Chevrette (1998), Jean-Pierre Jolivet (1998)
- Electoral and Parliamentary reform: Pierre Bélanger (1996–1997), Jean-Pierre Jolivet (1997–1998)
- Justice: Paul Begin (1996–1997), Serge Ménard (1997–1998)
- Public Safety: Robert Perreault (1996–1997), Pierre Bélanger (1997–1998)
- Finances and Revenue: Bernard Landry
- Finances (Delegate): Roger Bertrand (1996–1997), Rita Dionne-Marsolais (1997–1998)
- Economy and Finances (State Minister): Bernard Landry
- Industry, Commerce, Science and Technology: Bernard Landry (1996–1998), François Legault (1998)
- Industry and Commerce (Delegate): Rita Dionne-Marsolais (1996–1997), Roger Bertrand (1997–1998)
