= Yves Michaud (politician) =

Canadian politician (1930–2024)

- Born: February 13, 1930; Saint-Hyacinthe, Quebec, Canada
- Died: March 19, 2024 (aged 94); Montreal, Quebec, Canada
- Occupation: Politician

Yves Michaud (French: [iv miʃo]; February 13, 1930 – March 19, 2024) was a Canadian politician in Quebec who was a sovereigntist and pur et dur supporter of the Parti Québécois.

== Background ==
Yves Michaud was born in Saint-Hyacinthe, Quebec, Canada on February 13, 1930. In 1959, he received a Canada Council grant to study journalism in France at the Université de Strasbourg. He then began a career as a journalist for the Clairon in Saint-Hyacinthe. He was later chief editor of La Patrie and also had a chronicle for the magazine 7 jours.

Michaud died in Montreal on March 19, 2024, at the age of 94. No official cause of death was given, but it was reported in 2022 that he had Alzheimer's disease.

== Member of the legislature ==
Michaud joined the ranks of the Liberal Party of Quebec and was elected in the Gouin riding in the 1966 provincial election, which the Liberals lost. He became friends with fellow Liberals René Lévesque and Robert Bourassa, who would both later become Premiers of Quebec.

In 1969, Michaud left the Liberal Party and sat as an Independent to protest against the passage of Bill 63, a controversial language legislation. He ran for re-election as a Liberal candidate in the 1970 election, but was defeated by 12 votes by Parti Québécois candidate Guy Joron.

== Parti Québécois supporter ==
Michaud joined the Parti Québécois in the subsequent years and ran as a candidate of this party in the district of Bourassa in the 1973 Quebec general election. He lost against Liberal candidate Lise Bacon.

Michaud then founded Le Jour, the first daily newspaper promoting Quebec independence. In 1979, he was in charge of the Quebec Government House of Paris.

Michaud called the English language a scar and disfigurement on the face of Montreal. He also described the language situation in Quebec as a cancer that occasionally goes into remission.

== Robin Hood of the banks ==
Often called Robin des banques (Robin Hood of the banks), Yves Michaud is known by the people of Quebec for his crusade against the practices of large corporations. In 1993, he founded the Association des petits épargnants et investisseurs du Québec (Association of small savers and investors), and won a number of victories in court.

== The Michaud Affair ==
In December 2000 Yves Michaud announced that he would seek the Parti Québécois nomination for a by-election in the district of Mercier. However, his candidacy was plagued with controversy, after he made sensitive comments about the Jewish community in a radio interview.

One recollection of his comments, amongst other things, was that he stated that the Jewish people had suffered, but that other peoples had also endured great tragedies. ("The Jews weren't the only people to have suffered.") However, as the affair went along, due notably to Michaud's open defence of Quebecker nationalism, he was increasingly portrayed by some as an anti-semite and denier of the Shoah, which he always categorically said he was not.

It culminated in a motion of censure from the National Assembly of Quebec. Lucien Bouchard is also said to have been influenced by the weight of the affair (which received extremely negative coverage in the international press) to resign as Premier of Quebec in 2001 (although he did not admit it). Michaud fought to the end for recognition of the motion of censure as an "anti-democratic mistake".

Also, Bouchard announced that he would block Michaud's candidacy. Claudel Toussaint received the nomination. Michaud's faction ran its own candidate: Paul Cliche. Both sovereigntist candidates lost the by-election against Liberal nominee Nathalie Rochefort.

== See also ==
- Sovereigntist events and strategies
- Quebec sovereigntism

National Assembly of Quebec
Preceded by District created in 1965	MNA for Gouin; 1966–1970	Succeeded by Guy Joron (PQ)
