= Lyse Leduc =

Canadian politician

Member of the National Assembly of Quebec for Mille-Îles
- In office September 12, 1994 – April 14, 2003
- Preceded by: Jean-Pierre Bélisle
- Succeeded by: Maurice Clermont

Personal details
- Born: September 17, 1938 (age 87) Montreal, Quebec
- Party: Parti Québécois
- Profession: Educator

Lyse Leduc (born September 17, 1938) is a Quebec politician, she previously served as the member for Mille-Îles in the Quebec National Assembly as a member of the Parti Québécois from 1994 until 2003.

== Biography ==
Leduc was born in Montreal, the daughter of two teachers. She earned her certificate in art history and a certificate in andragogy from the Université de Montréal.

Leduc taught at the Montreal Catholic School Commission for twenty five years. She also served as Director General of the Intervention Council for Women's Access to Work.

== Political career ==
Leduc ran in the 1989 Quebec provincial election for the seat of Mille-Îles and lost to the incumbent Jean-Pierre Bélisle, she ran again in 1994 Quebec provincial election, with Bélisle having chosen not to run again and the PQ winning the election, she won in a very tight contest.

During her time in office, Leduc founded and was president of the Network of Women Parliamentarians of the Americas.

Leduc was re-elected in 1998 Quebec provincial election by a reduced margin in another tight race. She did not seek re-election in 2003.

== Electoral record ==
=== Provincial ===
1998 Quebec general election: Mille-Îles
Party	Candidate	Votes	%	±%
Parti Québécois	Lyse Leduc	17,465	43.61	-2.07
Liberal	Sylvain Lefebvre	16,600	41.45	-0.61
Action démocratique	André Beaulieu	5,440	13.58	+2.56
Bloc Pot	Christian Lajoie	322	0.80	–
Socialist Democracy	Jocelyne Desaultels	156	0.39	–
Innovator	Benoît Raymond	68	0.17	-0.30
Total valid votes		40,051	99.02	
Total rejected ballots		395	0.98	-0.94
Turnout		40,446	84.39	-2.28
Electors on the lists		47,928		
Parti Québécois hold		Swing		-1.34

1994 Quebec general election: Mille-Îles
Party	Candidate	Votes	%	±%
Parti Québécois	Lyse Leduc	17,337	45.68	+2.35
Liberal	Chantal Tremblay	15,966	42.06	-14.61
Action démocratique	Michel Ayotte	4,182	11.02	–
Natural Law	Claire Viau	295	0.78	–
Innovator	Léonard Huard	177	0.47	–
Total valid votes		37,957	98.08	
Total rejected ballots		742	1.92	-1.66
Turnout		38,699	86.87	+6.91
Electors on the lists		44,549		
Parti Québécois gain from Liberal		Swing		+8.46

1989 Quebec general election: Mille-Îles
Party	Candidate	Votes	%	±%
Liberal	Jean-Pierre Bélisle	16,436	56.67	+2.47
Parti Québécois	Lyse Leduc	12,569	43.33	+1.00
Total valid votes		29,005	96.42	
Total rejected ballots		1,078	3.58	+2.11
Turnout		30,083	79.66	-1.20
Electors on the lists		37,763		
Liberal hold		Swing		+1.74
