= Line Beauchamp =

Canadian politician (born 1963)

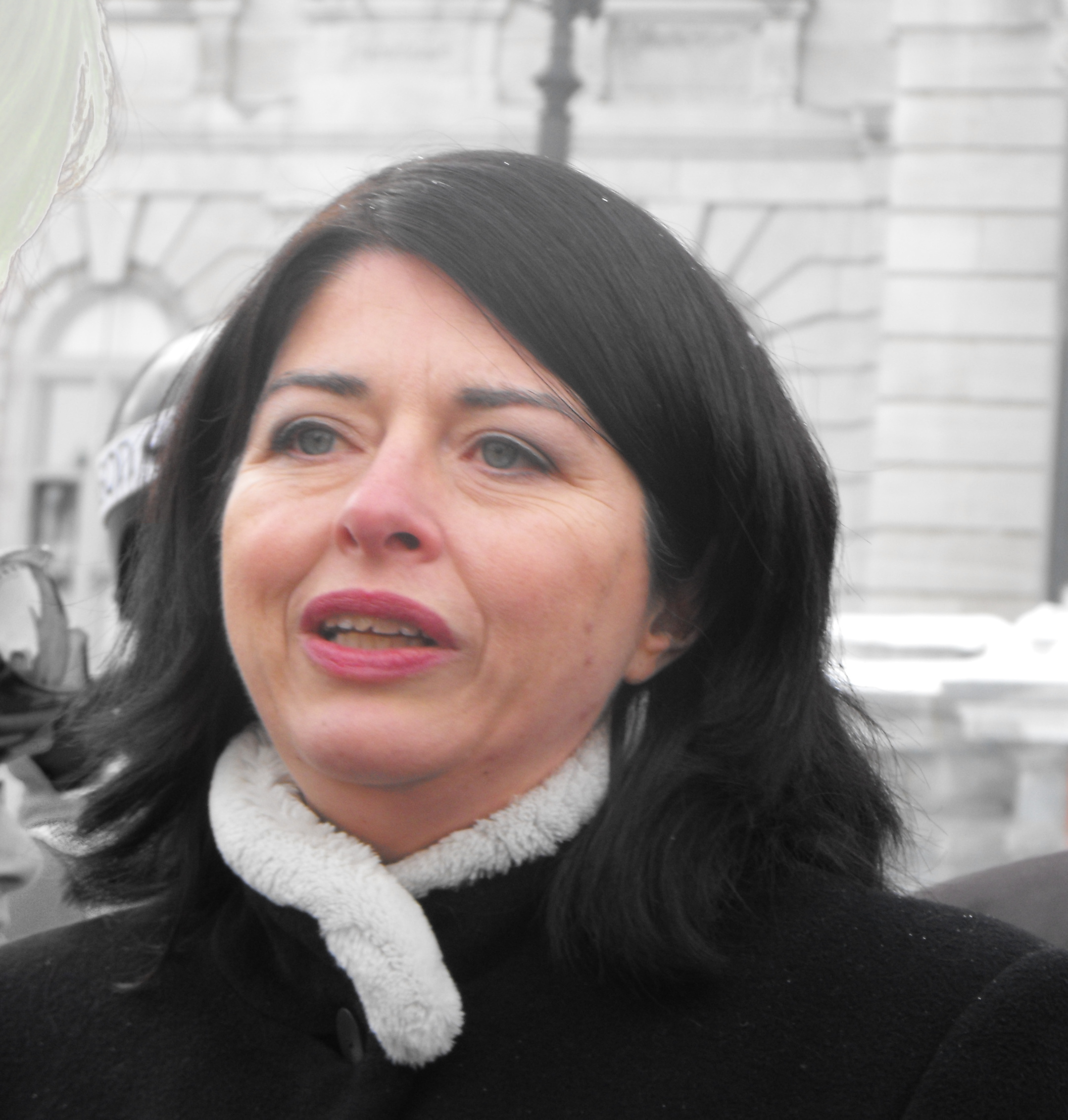

Deputy Premier of Quebec
- In office September 7, 2011 – May 14, 2012
- Premier: Jean Charest
- Preceded by: Nathalie Normandeau
- Succeeded by: Michelle Courchesne

Minister of Culture and Communications
- In office April 29, 2003 – April 18, 2007

Minister of Sustainable Development, Environment and Parks
- In office April 18, 2007 – August 10, 2010

Minister of Education, Recreation and Sports
- In office August 11, 2010 – May 14, 2012
- Preceded by: Michelle Courchesne
- Succeeded by: Michelle Courchesne

Member of the National Assembly of Quebec for Bourassa-Sauvé Sauvé (1998-2003)
- In office November 30, 1998 – May 14, 2012
- Preceded by: Marcel Parent
- Succeeded by: Rita de Santis

Personal details
- Born: February 24, 1963 (age 63) Salaberry-de-Valleyfield, Québec
- Party: Quebec Liberal Party

Line Beauchamp (born February 24, 1963) is a Canadian politician. She served as the Liberal Member of the National Assembly (MNA) for the Sauvé riding, and for Bourassa-Sauvé at the Quebec National Assembly from November 30, 1998 to May 14, 2012. She also served as Minister of Culture and Communications from April 29, 2003 to April 18, 2007, Minister of Sustainable Development, Environment and Parks from April 18, 2007 to August 10, 2010, and served as Minister of Education, Recreation, and Sports from August 11, 2010, and as Deputy Premier of Quebec from September 7, 2011, until she resigned on May 14, 2012 as a result of the 2012 Quebec student protests.

In January 2013, she founded her strategic consulting company and took on a variety of contracts with clients from an array of sectors including culture, education, real estate, and professional services. She is also a guest columnist for Le Journal de Montréal.

Born in Valleyfield, Line Beauchamp earned a BAC in psychology from Université de Montréal in 1985. From 1984 to 1985, she worked as a teaching assistant in that same institution and in 1987 became the Director of Info-croissance, a consumer protection association dealing with psychotherapy, self-help, and cults. From 1991-1993 Line Beauchamp worked as Executive Director for the 101,5 CIBL-FM radio station. In 1993, she became the Executive Director for Pro-Est, the society for the promotion and socio-economic partnerships of Montreal East, until 1998. Between 1989 and 1998, Line Beauchamp was a member of several executive committees, including the l'Association coopérative d'économie familiale du Centre de Montréal (ACEF) from 1989 to 1993, the Corporation de développement de l'Est (CDEST) from 1993-1997, Collège de Maisonneuve from 1995 to 1998, and the Régie des installations olympiques (RIO) from 1996-1998, in addition to being a member of the Réseau des gens d'affaires de l'Est from 1993 to 1998.

In 2013 and 2014 she was a member of the Executive Committee for Maisonneuve-Rosemont Hospital, Rivière-des-Prairies Hospital's Fondation les Petits Trésors, Fondation Père-Ménard, Zoofest and Mondial des jeux.

== Political career ==
During the 1998 Quebec general election, Line Beauchamp won the Sauvé riding. Elected under the banner of the Quebec Liberal Party, she thus became a member of the official opposition, with the Parti Québécois in power (the Lucien Bouchard and Bernard Landry government). She was the Official Opposition Critic in matters of culture and communications. She was also one of the ministers tasked with leading diplomatic missions in Belgium, Catalonia and Europe.

Re-elected during the 2003 elections, Line Beauchamp became the Minister of Culture and Communications on April 29, 2003, following the election of the Quebec Liberal Party. As of February 18, 2005, she also became the minister responsible for the Montreal region.

In the weeks before the 2007 election, Line Beauchamp was named Director of the Quebec Liberal Party electoral campaign. The day of the election, she took home a third victory in her riding. A little over three weeks later, she was named Minister of Sustainable Development, Environment, and Parks.

During the August 2010 cabinet shuffle, she became the Minister of Education, Recreation, and Sports, replacing Michelle Courchesne, who joined Treasury Board. On September 7, 2011, following the resignation of Nathalie Normandeau, Line Beauchamp became the 15th Deputy Premier of Quebec.

During the spring of 2012, she was at the heart of the student strike against raising tuition fees. This strike was the longest student strike in the history of Quebec. On May 14, 2012, After 13 weeks of protests, Beauchamp resigned from cabinet and also as an MNA. During a press conference she stated that she was "no longer part of the solution", and that the gesture was her "ultimate compromise" to resolve the crisis.

== Electoral record (incomplete) ==
2008 Quebec general election: Bourassa-Sauvé
Party	Candidate	Votes	%	±%
Liberal	Line Beauchamp (incumbent)	13,950	61.33	+11.25
Parti Québécois	Roland Carrier	6,111	26.87	+4.10
Action démocratique	Guy Mailloux	1,947	8.56	-11.88
Québec solidaire	Enrico Gambardella	738	3.24	-0.10
Total valid votes		22,746	100.00	
Total rejected ballots		471		
Turnout		23,217	47.68	-15.43
Electors		48,694		
Source: Official Results, Le Directeur général des élections du Québec.

2007 Quebec general election: Bourassa-Sauvé
Party	Candidate	Votes	%	±%
Liberal	Line Beauchamp (incumbent)	15,631	50.08	-10.99
Parti Québécois	Roland Carrier	7,105	22.77	-2.18
Action démocratique	Guy Mailloux	6,379	20.44	+9.02
Québec solidaire	Marie-Noëlle Doucet-Paquin	1,043	3.34	
Green	Marie-Ange Germain	891	2.85	+1.86
Independent	Charles-Antoine Gabriel	160	0.51	
Total valid votes		31,209	100.00	
Total rejected ballots		550		
Turnout		31,759	63.11	-1.11
Electors		50,323		
Source: Official Results, Le Directeur général des élections du Québec.

2003 Quebec general election: Bourassa-Sauvé
Party	Candidate	Votes	%	±%
Liberal	Line Beauchamp (incumbent)	20,175	61.07	
Parti Québécois	Kettly Beauregard	8,243	24.95	
Action démocratique	Michelle Allaire	3,771	11.42	
Green	Francis Mallette	327	0.99	
Communist	Sylvain Archambault	261	0.79	
Christian Democracy	Denis Gagné	119	0.36	
Marxist–Leninist	Claude Brunelle	94	0.28	
Equality	Boris Mospan	44	0.13	
Total valid votes		33,034	100.00	
Total rejected ballots		573		
Turnout		33,607	64.22	
Electors		52,332		
Source: Official Results, Le Directeur général des élections du Québec.

1998 Quebec general election: Sauvé
Party	Candidate	Votes	%
Liberal	Line Beauchamp	14,125	58.45
Parti Québécois	Umberto di Genova	7,413	30.68
Action démocratique	Eric Sigouin	2,084	8.62
Communist	Sylvain Archambault	192	0.79
Socialist Democracy	Eric Fontaine	172	0.71
Innovator	Nicole Corbeil	123	0.51
Natural Law	Franklin Valois	57	0.24
Total valid votes		24,166	100.00
Total rejected ballots		332	
Turnout		24,498	76.27
Electors		32,122	
Source: Official Results, Le Directeur général des élections du Québec.

Political offices
Preceded by Nathalie Normandeau	Deputy Premier of Quebec; 2011–2012	Succeeded by Michelle Courchesne
Preceded by Michelle Courchesne	Minister of Education, Sports and Leisure; 2010–2012	Succeeded by Michelle Courchesne
Preceded by Claude Bechard	Minister of Sustainable Development, Environment and Parks; 2007–2010	Succeeded by Pierre Arcand
Preceded by Diane Lemieux	Minister of Culture and Communications; 2003–2007	Succeeded by Christine St-Pierre
