= Patrice Laplante =

Canadian politician

Member of the National Assembly of Quebec for Bourassa
- In office November 15, 1976 – December 2, 1985
- Preceded by: Lise Bacon
- Succeeded by: Louise Robic

Personal details
- Born: February 17, 1929 Cabano, Quebec, Canada
- Died: August 6, 2020 (aged 91) Laval, Quebec, Canada
- Party: Parti Québécois
- Spouse: Denise Lafleur (m. 1952)
- Profession: Mechanic

Patrice Laplante (February 17, 1929 – August 6, 2020) was a Canadian politician who represented the riding of Bourassa in the National Assembly of Quebec from 1976 to 1985 as a member of the Parti Québécois.

== Early life ==
Patrice Laplante was born on February 17, 1929, in Cabano, Quebec, to Élude Laplante and Éva Leblanc. He later moved to Montreal, where he worked as a mechanic and later as a businessman in the north end of the city for sixteen years. In 1952, he married Denise Lafleur, a stenographer.

From 1971 to 1973, Laplante served as president of the École secondaire Calixa-Lavallée committee. He also served as a commissioner on the Montreal Catholic School Commission from 1970 to 1977. From 1973 to 1976, Laplante was a member of the executive board of the Fédération des commissions scolaires catholiques du Québec.

== Political career ==
Laplante ran as the Parti Québécois candidate for the riding of Bourassa in the 1976 Quebec general election. He won the election, defeating Liberal incumbent Lise Bacon. He was re-elected in 1981 and served as deputy government whip from September 1, 1983, to October 23, 1985. He did not run again in 1985.

== Later life ==
After leaving provincial politics, Laplante served as a commissioner on the workers' compensation appeals board from 1985 to 1987.

He died on August 6, 2020, in Laval, Quebec at the age of 91.

== Electoral history ==
1981 Quebec general election: Bourassa
Party	Candidate	Votes	%	±%
Parti Québécois	Patrice Laplante	15,597	50.37	+5.43
Liberal	Augustin Roy	14,674	47.39	+9.16
Union Nationale	Charles E. Laforest	571	1.84	-12.01
United Social Credit	Rolland Boudreau	124	0.40	–

1976 Quebec general election: Bourassa
Party	Candidate	Votes	%	±%
Parti Québécois	Patrice Laplante	14,465	44.94	+4.35
Liberal	Lise Bacon	12,303	38.23	-15.58
Union Nationale	Robert Brisson	4,457	13.85	+12.04
Ralliement créditiste	Paulette Danis St-Onge	601	1.87	-2.09
Parti national populaire	Carmine Ciccarelli	249	0.77	–
Communist	Vittorina Rizotto Bronzati	109	0.34	–
