= Mille-Îles =

Provincial electoral district in Quebec, Canada

Quebec electoral district
- Location in Laval

Provincial electoral district
- Legislature: National Assembly of Quebec
MNA
Virginie Dufour
Liberal
- District created: 1972
- First contested: 1973
- Last contested: 2026

Demographics
- Electors (2012): 41,384
- Area (km²): 86.8
- Census division: Laval (part)
- Census subdivision: Laval (part)

Mille-Îles (French pronunciation: [mil il], lit. 'Thousand Islands') is a provincial electoral district in Quebec, Canada, that elects members to the National Assembly of Quebec. The district is located in Laval and includes the eastern portion of the island of Laval (Île Jésus).

It was created for the 1973 election from a part of Fabre.

In the change from the 2001 to the 2011 electoral map, it lost some territory to Vimont electoral district.

In 2026, the riding added the remainder of Duvernay from Laval-des-Rapides.

== Members of the National Assembly ==
Legislature	Years	Member	Party
Riding created from Fabre
30th	1973–1976	Bernard Lachance	Liberal
31st	1976–1981	Guy Joron	Parti Québécois
32nd	1981–1985	Jean-Paul Champagne	Parti Québécois
33rd	1985–1989	Jean-Pierre Bélisle	Liberal
34th	1989–1994	Jean-Pierre Bélisle	Liberal
35th	1994–1998	Lyse Leduc	Parti Québécois
36th	1998–2003	Lyse Leduc	Parti Québécois
37th	2003–2007	Maurice Clermont	Liberal
38th	2007–2008	Maurice Clermont	Liberal
39th	2008–2012	Francine Charbonneau	Liberal
40th	2012–2014	Francine Charbonneau	Liberal
41st	2014–2018	Francine Charbonneau	Liberal
42nd	2018–2022	Francine Charbonneau	Liberal
43rd	2022–2026	Virginie Dufour	Liberal
44th	2026–Present	Virginie Dufour	Liberal

== Election results ==
2026 Quebec general election
** Preliminary results — Not yet official **
Party	Candidate	Votes	%	±%
Liberal	Virginie Dufour	14,512	44.32	
Parti Québécois	Mathieu Trottier-Kavanagh	7,104	21.69	
Conservative	Nare Stepanyan	4,139	12.64	
Québec solidaire	Zachary Robert	3,768	11.51	
Coalition Avenir Québec	Sonia Amedome	3,111	9.50	
Osons Québec	Ludovic Mbany	112	0.34	
Total valid votes				
Total rejected ballots				
Turnout			66.33	
Electors on the lists			–	–
Source: Élections Québec

2022 Quebec general election redistributed results
Party	Vote	%
Coalition Avenir Québec	10,188	31.98
Liberal	10,093	31.68
Québec solidaire	4,093	12.85
Parti Québécois	3,927	12.33
Conservative	3,209	10.07
Green	347	1.09

2022 Quebec general election
Party	Candidate	Votes	%	±%
Liberal	Virginie Dufour	9,522	32.38	-3.44
Coalition Avenir Québec	Julie Séide	9,097	30,93	-0.74
Québec solidaire	Guillaume Lajoie	3,789	12.88	+0.11
Parti Québécois	Michel Lachance	3,551	12.07	-3.00
Conservative	Ange Claude Bigilimana	3,105	10.56	+10.56
Green	Bianca Jitaru	346	1.18	-1.65
Total valid votes		29,410	98.78	–
Total rejected ballots		3.63	1.22	–
Turnout		29,773	66.98	+0.51
Electors on the lists		44,453	–	–
Liberal hold		Swing		-1.35

Source:.

2018 Quebec general election
Party	Candidate	Votes	%	±%
Liberal	Francine Charbonneau	10,408	35.82	-14.68
Coalition Avenir Québec	Mauro Barone	9,202	31.67	+14.05
Parti Québécois	Michel Lachance	4,378	15.07	-10.46
Québec solidaire	Jean Trudelle	3,711	12.77	+8.04
Green	Alain Joseph	822	2.83	+1.76
Parti libre	Dwayne Cappelletti	403	1.39	
Bloc Pot	Jason D'Aoust	134	0.46	
Total valid votes		29,058	98.51	
Total rejected ballots		439	1.49	+0.23
Turnout		29,497	66.47	-10.83
Eligible voters		44,374		
Liberal hold		Swing		-14.36
Source(s) "Rapport des résultats officiels du scrutin". Élections Québec.

2014 Quebec general election
Party	Candidate	Votes	%	±%
Liberal	Francine Charbonneau	16,499	50.50	
Parti Québécois	Djemila Benhabib	8,339	25.52	
Coalition Avenir Québec	Sylvain Loranger	5,757	17.62	
Québec solidaire	Anik Paradis	1,545	4.73	
Green	Bianca Jitaru	348	1.07	
Conservative	David Mirabella	98	0.30	
Option nationale	Maël Rieussec	84	0.26	
Total valid votes		32,670	98.74	–
Total rejected ballots		417	1.26	–
Turnout		33,087	77.30	
Electors on the lists		42,804	–	–

Source: Official Results, Le Directeur général des élections du Québec.

2012 Quebec general election
Party	Candidate	Votes	%	±%
Liberal	Francine Charbonneau	11,908	37.36	-9.40
Parti Québécois	Robert Carrier	10,138	31.81	-4.61
Coalition Avenir Québec	Jean Prud'homme	7,420	23.28	
Québec solidaire	Nicole Bellerose	1,508	4.73	+2.03
Green	Henrico Negro	376	1.18	-1.53
Option nationale	Alain Sénécal	352	1.10	–
Independent	Régent Millette	121	0.38	
Quebec Citizens' Union	Carlos Silva	52	0.16	–
Total valid votes				–
Total rejected ballots				–
Turnout				
Electors on the lists			–	–

2008 Quebec general election: Mille-Îles
Party	Candidate	Votes	%	±%
Liberal	Francine Charbonneau	15,628	46.76	+8.02
Parti Québécois	Donato Centomo	12,172	36.42	+9.36
Action démocratique	Pierre Tremblay	3,585	10.73	−16.74
Green	Maude Delangis	905	2.71	−0.95
Québec solidaire	Nicole Bellerose	901	2.70	−0.13
Independent	Isabelle Gérin-Lajoie	186	0.56	–
Independent	Régent Millette	44	0.13	−0.10
Total valid votes		33,421	98.46	
Rejected and declined votes		523	1.54	
Turnout		33,944	60.66	−15.27
Electors on the lists		55,956		

Source: Official Results, Le Directeur général des élections du Québec.

2007 Quebec general election: Mille-Îles
Party	Candidate	Votes	%	±%
Liberal	Maurice Clermont	15,978	38.74	−11.44
Action démocratique	Pierre Tremblay	11,330	27.47	+14.64
Parti Québécois	Maude Delangis	11,159	27.06	−9.04
Green	Christian Lajoie	1,511	3.66	–
Québec solidaire	Nicole Bellerose	1,169	2.83	–
Independent	Régent Millette	96	0.23	−0.05
Total valid votes		41,243	99.03	
Rejected and declined votes		402	0.97	
Turnout		41,645	75.93	−0.21
Electors on the lists		54,848		

Source: Official Results, Le Directeur général des élections du Québec.

2003 Quebec general election: Mille-Îles
Party	Candidate	Votes	%	±%
Liberal	Maurice Clermont	19,924	50.18	
Parti Québécois	Maude Delangis	14,333	36.10	
Action démocratique	Gerry La Rocca	5,093	12.83	
Independent	Christian Lajoie	244	0.61	
Christian Democracy	Régent Millette	113	0.28	
Total valid votes		39,707	98.56	
Rejected and declined votes		581	1.44	
Turnout		40,288	76.14	-8.25
Electors on the lists		52,915		

Source: Official Results, Le Directeur général des élections du Québec.

1998 Quebec general election
Party	Candidate	Votes	%	±%
Parti Québécois	Lyse Leduc	17,465	43.61	-2.07
Liberal	Sylvain Lefebvre	16,600	41.45	-0.61
Action démocratique	André Beaulieu	5,440	13.58	+2.56
Bloc Pot	Christian Lajoie	322	0.80	–
Socialist Democracy	Jocelyne Desaultels	156	0.39	–
Innovator	Benoît Raymond	68	0.17	-0.30
Total valid votes		40,051	99.02	
Total rejected ballots		395	0.98	-0.94
Turnout		40,446	84.39	-2.28
Electors on the lists		47,928		
Parti Québécois hold		Swing		-1.34

1994 Quebec general election
Party	Candidate	Votes	%	±%
Parti Québécois	Lyse Leduc	17,337	45.68	+2.35
Liberal	Chantal Tremblay	15,966	42.06	-14.61
Action démocratique	Michel Ayotte	4,182	11.02	–
Natural Law	Claire Viau	295	0.78	–
Innovator	Léonard Huard	177	0.47	–
Total valid votes		37,957	98.08	
Total rejected ballots		742	1.92	-1.66
Turnout		38,699	86.87	+6.91
Electors on the lists		44,549		
Parti Québécois gain from Liberal		Swing		+8.46

1989 Quebec general election
Party	Candidate	Votes	%	±%
Liberal	Jean-Pierre Bélisle	16,436	56.67	+2.47
Parti Québécois	Lyse Leduc	12,569	43.33	+1.00
Total valid votes		29,005	96.42	
Total rejected ballots		1,078	3.58	+2.11
Turnout		30,083	79.66	-1.20
Electors on the lists		37,763		
Liberal hold		Swing		+1.74

== See also ==
- List of Quebec provincial electoral districts
- Canadian provincial electoral districts
