= Maurice-Richard =

Provincial electoral district in Quebec, Canada

Coordinates: 45.548°N 73.656°W

Quebec electoral district
- Location in Montreal

Provincial electoral district
- Legislature: National Assembly of Quebec
MNA
Nada Boumeftah
Liberal
- District created: 1972
- First contested: 1973
- Last contested: 2026

Demographics
- Population (2011): 65,930
- Electors (2014): 46,596
- Area (km²): 11.7
- Pop. density (per km²): 5,635
- Census division: Montreal (part)
- Census subdivision: Montreal (part)

Maurice-Richard (French pronunciation: [mɔʁis ʁiʃaʁ]) is a provincial electoral district in the Montreal region of Quebec, Canada, which elects a member to the National Assembly of Quebec. It comprises parts of the Ahuntsic-Cartierville and Montréal-Nord boroughs of the city of Montreal. The riding was known from 1972 to 2018 as Crémazie.

It was created for the 1973 election from parts of Ahuntsic and Bourassa electoral districts.

In the change from the 2001 to the 2011 electoral map, its territory was unchanged.

== Members of the National Assembly ==
Legislature	Years	Member	Party
Riding created from Ahuntsic and Bourassa
30th	1973–1976	Jean Bienvenue	Liberal
31st	1976–1981	Guy Tardif	Parti Québécois
32nd	1981–1985	Guy Tardif	Parti Québécois
33rd	1985–1989	André Vallerand	Liberal
34th	1989–1994	André Vallerand	Liberal
35th	1994–1998	Jean Campeau	Parti Québécois
36th	1998–2003	Manon Blanchet	Parti Québécois
37th	2003–2007	Michèle Lamquin-Éthier	Liberal
38th	2007–2008	Lisette Lapointe	Parti Québécois
39th	2008–2011	Lisette Lapointe	Parti Québécois
39th	2011–2012	Lisette Lapointe	Independent
40th	2012–2014	Diane De Courcy	Parti Québécois
41st	2014–2018	Marie Montpetit	Liberal
42nd	2018–2021	Marie Montpetit	Liberal
42nd	2021–2022	Marie Montpetit	Independent
43rd	2022–2026	Haroun Bouazzi	Québec solidaire
44th	2026–Present	Nada Boumeftah	Liberal

== Election results ==
=== Maurice-Richard ===
2026 Quebec general election
** Preliminary results — Not yet official **
Party	Candidate	Votes	%	±%
Liberal	Nada Boumeftah	9,771	31.07	
Québec solidaire	Anne Latendresse	9,462	30.09	
Parti Québécois	Aisha Issa	7,763	24.69	
Coalition Avenir Québec	Georges Chartier	2,550	8.11	
Conservative	Mercidieu Doréus	1,703	5.42	
Parti nul	Isaac Varin	199	0.63	
Total valid votes				
Total rejected ballots				
Turnout			69.32	
Electors on the lists			–	–
Source: Élections Québec

2022 Quebec general election
Party	Candidate	Votes	%	±%
Québec solidaire	Haroun Bouazzi	10,903	34.67	+6.81
Coalition Avenir Québec	Audrey Murray	8,542	27.16	+7.41
Liberal	Jonathan Marleau	5,414	17.22	-12.30
Parti Québécois	Chantal Jorg	4,612	14.67	-4.46
Conservative	Louise Sexton	1,322	4.20	–
Green	Gilles Fournelle	311	0.99	-0.89
Bloc Montreal	Andrea Di Stefano	145	0.46	–
Independent	Kassandre Chéry Théodat	115	0.37	–
Climat Québec	Patrick Bouchardy	83	0.26	–
Total valid votes		31,447	98.69	–
Total rejected ballots		419	1.31	-0.18
Turnout		31,866	68.36	-0.27
Electors on the lists		46,618	–	–
Québec solidaire gain from Liberal		Swing		+9.55

2018 Quebec general election
Party	Candidate	Votes	%	±%
Liberal	Marie Montpetit	9,459	29.52	-9.48
Québec solidaire	Raphaël Rebelo	8,929	27.86	+14.15
Coalition Avenir Québec	Manon Gauthier	6,330	19.75	+6.02
Parti Québécois	Frédéric Lapointe	6,131	19.13	-12.47
Green	Gilles Fournelle	602	1.88	+0.58
New Democratic	Jean Rémillard	216	0.67	
Parti nul	Manon Dupuis	214	0.67	
Bloc Pot	Morgan Ali	90	0.28	
Citoyens au pouvoir	Daniel St-Hilaire	77	0.24	
Total valid votes		32,048	98.51	
Total rejected ballots		486	1.49	+0.11
Turnout		32,534	68.63	-6.38
Eligible voters		47,407		
Liberal hold		Swing		-11.82
Source(s) "Rapport des résultats officiels du scrutin". Élections Québec.

=== Crémazie ===
2014 Quebec general election
Party	Candidate	Votes	%	±%
Liberal	Marie Montpetit	13,440	39.00	+10.16
Parti Québécois	Diane De Courcy	10,892	31.60	-7.01
Coalition Avenir Québec	Sylvain Bessette	4,731	13.73	-3.37
Québec solidaire	André Frappier	4,726	13.71	+2.14
Green	Virginia Leurent-Bonnevie	448	1.30	-0.19
Option nationale	Gabrielle Ladouceur-Despins	227	0.66	-1.72
Total valid votes		34,464	98.61	–
Total rejected ballots		485	1.39	–
Turnout		34,949	75.00	-1.63
Electors on the lists		46,596	–	–
Liberal gain		Swing		+8.59

2012 Quebec general election
Party	Candidate	Votes	%	±%
Parti Québécois	Diane De Courcy	13,392	38.61	-6.52
Liberal	Eleni Bakopanos	10,004	28.84	-11.38
Coalition Avenir Québec	Carla El-Ghandour	5,933	17.10	+10.81
Québec solidaire	André Frappier	4,014	11.57	+5.91
Option nationale	Yanek Lauzière-Fillion	825	2.38	–
Green	Yves Laporte	518	1.49	-1.21
Total valid votes		34,686	98.65	–
Total rejected ballots		475	1.35	–
Turnout		35,161	76.63	+14.34
Electors on the lists		45,887	–	–
Parti Québécois hold		Swing		+2.43

^ CAQ Result compared to Action démocratique

2008 Quebec general election
Party	Candidate	Votes	%	±%
Parti Québécois	Lisette Lapointe	12,972	45.13	+9.13
Liberal	Martin Cossette	11,560	40.22	+4.71
Action démocratique	Diane Charbonneau	1,808	6.29	-9.81
Québec solidaire	André Frappier	1,627	5.66	-0.79
Green	Daniel Hémond	776	2.70	-2.92
Total valid votes		28,743	98.54	–
Total rejected ballots		425	1.46	–
Turnout		29,168	62.29	-11.55
Electors on the lists		46,823	–	–
Parti Québécois hold		Swing		+2.21

2007 Quebec general election
Party	Candidate	Votes	%	±%
Parti Québécois	Lisette Lapointe	12,388	36.00	-3.92
Liberal	Michèle Lamquin-Éthier	12,218	35.51	-8.75
Action démocratique	Geneviève Tousignant	5,540	16.10	+4.51
Québec solidaire	André Frappier	2,218	6.45	+4.49*
Green	Nathalie Gingras	1,934	5.62	+4.48
Marxist–Leninist	Marsha Fine	112	0.33	+0.07
Total valid votes		34,410	99.00	–
Total rejected ballots		349	1.00	–
Turnout		34,759	73.84	+0.41
Electors on the lists		47,076	–	–
Parti Québécois gain		Swing		+2.42

* Result compared to UFP

2003 Quebec general election
Party	Candidate	Votes	%	±%
Liberal	Michèle Lamquin-Éthier	15,498	44.26	-0.08
Parti Québécois	Hugues Cormier	13,979	39.92	-5.43
Action démocratique	Manon St-Louis	4,057	11.59	+3.21
UFP	Jocelyne Desautels	686	1.96	–
Green	Claude Trudel	399	1.14	–
Bloc Pot	Philippe Beauvais	306	0.87	+0.17
Marxist–Leninist	Marsha Fine	90	0.26	–
Total valid votes		35,015	98.63	–
Total rejected ballots		485	1.37	–
Turnout		35,500	73.43	–
Electors on the lists		48,344	–	–
Liberal gain		Swing		+2.68

1998 Quebec general election
Party	Candidate	Votes	%	±%
Parti Québécois	Manon Blanchet	13,953	45.35	-1.44
Liberal	Roch Carrier	13,644	44.34	-1.07
Action démocratique	Éric Jolander	2,579	8.38	+2.88
Socialist Democracy	Martine Lauzon	218	0.71	-0.38
Bloc Pot	Étienne Saint-Amour	214	0.70	–
Natural Law	Denis Cauchon	88	0.29	-0.33
Innovator	André Giguère	39	0.13	0.00
Communist	Ulises Nitor	33	0.11	-0.12
Total valid votes		30,768	99.09	–
Total rejected ballots		282	0.91	–
Turnout		31,050	81.34	–
Electors on the lists		38,175	–	–
Parti Québécois hold		Swing		-0.19

1995 Quebec referendum
Side	Votes	%
Non	18,141	51.45
Oui	17,120	48.55

1994 Quebec general election
Party	Candidate	Votes	%	±%
Parti Québécois	Jean Campeau	14,482	46.79	+4.45
Liberal	Michel Décary	14,053	45.41	-4.79
Action démocratique	Robert Robitaille	1,750	5.50	–
New Democratic	Ginette St-Amour	337	1.09	-0.56
Natural Law	Carmel Bernard	193	0.62	–
Communist	Serge Linnikoff	72	0.23	–
Republic of Canada	Normand Normandeau	68	0.22	-0.26
Innovator	Jean Yves Thorne	40	0.13	–

1992 Charlottetown Accord referendum
Side	Votes	%
Non	17,656	55.47
Oui	14,173	44.53

1989 Quebec general election: Crémazie
Party	Candidate	Votes	%	±%
Liberal	André Vallerand	15,100	50.20	+1.31
Parti Québécois	Lise Dagenais	12,736	42.34	-2.74
Green	Hélène Deschênes	1,385	4.60	–
New Democratic	Jean Denis	496	1.65	-0.72
Commonwealth of Canada	Christiane Deland-Gervais	143	0.48	+0.24
Workers	Claudya Kutowsky	115	0.38	–
Marxist–Leninist	Christine Dandenault	103	0.34	–
Total valid votes		30,078	97.69	–
Total rejected ballots		710	2.31	–
Turnout		30,788	79.13	-0.90
Eligible voters		38,910	–	–
Liberal hold		Swing		+2.04
Source: Official Results, Le Directeur général des élections du Québec.

1985 Quebec general election
Party	Candidate	Votes	%	±%
Liberal	André Vallerand	16,115	48.89	+3.24
Parti Québécois	Guy Tardif	14,560	45.08	-6.37
New Democratic	Pierre Leduc	765	2.37	–
Parti indépendantiste	Louise Crépel	276	0.86	–
Progressive Conservative	Laurence Lemyre	233	0.72	–
Independent	Carole Caron	211	0.65	–
Commonwealth of Canada	Christiane Deland	78	0.24	–
Christian Socialist	Yvan Lauzon	62	0.19	–

1981 Quebec general election
Party	Candidate	Votes	%	±%
Parti Québécois	Guy Tardif	16,938	51.45	+1.05
Liberal	Gilles Perron	15,355	46.65	+10.37
Union Nationale	Richer M. Francoeur	545	1.66	-8.90
Marxist–Leninist	Carolyn Zapf	80	0.24	–

1980 Quebec referendum
Side	Votes	%
Non	18,112	56.15
Oui	14,147	43.85

1976 Quebec general election
Party	Candidate	Votes	%	±%
Parti Québécois	Guy Tardif	16,463	50.40	+4.60
Liberal	Jean Bienvenue	11,851	36.28	-13.90
Union Nationale	Maurice L'Écuyer	3,449	10.56	+9.15
Ralliement créditiste	Léopold Mercier	461	1.41	-1.04
Parti national populaire	Gilles Legault	277	0.85	–
Communist	Claire Da Sylva Demers	83	0.25	–
NDP – RMS coalition	André Lavallée	80	0.25	–

1973 Quebec general election
Party	Candidate	Votes	%
Liberal	Jean Bienvenue	15,993	50.18
Parti Québécois	Jacques Parizeau	14,597	45.80
Parti créditiste	Jacques Desjardins	783	2.45
Union Nationale	Daniel Rock	450	1.41
Marxist–Leninist	Marc Blouin	50	0.16

== See also ==
- List of Quebec provincial electoral districts
- Canadian provincial electoral districts
