= Nada Boumeftah =

Canadian politician

Nada Boumeftah MNA

Member of the National Assembly for Maurice-Richard
- Incumbent
- Assumed office October 5, 2026
- Preceded by: Haroun Bouazzi

Personal details
- Party: Liberal Party
- Profession: Lawyer

Nada Boumeftah MNA is a Canadian lawyer and politician who serves as a member of the National Assembly of Quebec representing the Maurice-Richard district since 2026. She is a member of the Liberal Party. A lawyer specializing in criminal law, penal law, and youth protection, Nada Boumeftah founded her own law firm in 2016. She is involved with the pro bono legal clinics at Saint-Michel and HocheLéga, and is also an ambassador for Big Brothers Big Sisters of Montreal. She is fluent in English, French and Arabic and of Moroccan origin.

On the night of the 2026 election, a Radio-Canada interview given by Bomeftah went viral for her enthusiasm. Bomeftah was also a contestant in the Quebec edition of the reality television show The Traitors.

== Electoral record ==
2026 Quebec general election: Maurice-Richard
** Preliminary results — Not yet official **
Party	Candidate	Votes	%	±%
Liberal	Nada Boumeftah	9,771	31.07	
Québec solidaire	Anne Latendresse	9,462	30.09	
Parti Québécois	Aisha Issa	7,763	24.69	
Coalition Avenir Québec	Georges Chartier	2,550	8.11	
Conservative	Mercidieu Doréus	1,703	5.42	
Parti nul	Isaac Varin	199	0.63	
Total valid votes				
Total rejected ballots				
Turnout			69.32	
Electors on the lists			–	–
Source: Élections Québec
