= Djemila Benhabib =

Canadian journalist, writer, and politician

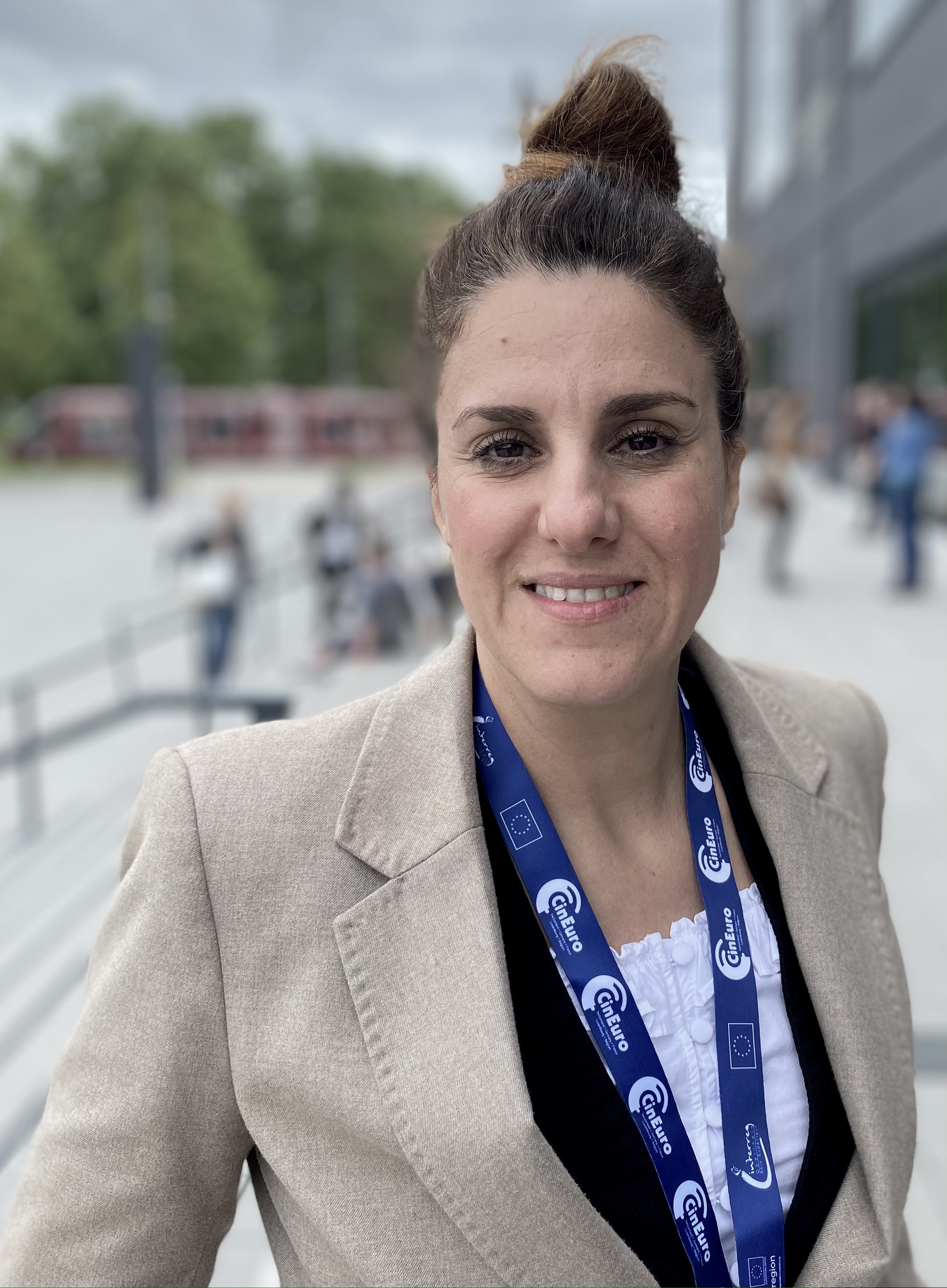
- Djemila Benhabib in Strasbourg (2021)
- Born: 1972 (age 53–54); Ukraine
- Occupations: journalist, writer, and politician
- Notable work: Ma vie à contre-Coran: une femme témoigne sur les islamistes

Djemila Benhabib (Arabic: جميلة بن حبيب) (born 1972) is a Canadian journalist, writer, and politician who lives in Bruxelles, Belgium. She is of Algerian and Greek-Cypriot descent, and is known for her opposition to Islam.

== Biography ==
She was born in Ukraine in 1972, but grew up in Algeria. Her father is Algerian and her mother Greek Cypriot.

She was a finalist for the 2009 Governor General's Literary Awards for her non-fiction book Ma vie à contre-Coran: une femme témoigne sur les islamistes. Her second book is Les soldats d'Allah à l'assaut de l'Occident.

In 2010, she appeared on the Jean-Marie Colombani invite show on Public Sénat, the television channel of the French Senate.

In 2012, she received Le Prix international de la laïcité.

She was the Parti Québécois candidate for Trois-Rivières in the 2012 Quebec general election, but narrowly failed to defeat the sitting member, Danielle St-Amand.

She was again candidate in 2014, this time in Mille-Îles, but was defeated by Liberal candidate Francine Charbonneau.
