= Michèle Lamquin-Éthier =

Canadian politician and lawyer

Member of the National Assembly of Quebec for Crémazie
- In office 2003–2007
- Preceded by: Manon Blanchet
- Succeeded by: Lisette Lapointe

Member of the National Assembly of Quebec for Bourassa
- In office 1997–2003
- Preceded by: Yvon Charbonneau
- Succeeded by: Riding abolished

Personal details
- Born: December 12, 1946 (age 79) Montreal, Quebec, Canada
- Party: Quebec Liberal Party
- Children: 3
- Profession: Lawyer

Michèle Lamquin-Étheir (born December 12, 1946) is a Canadian lawyer and former politician who served as a member of the National Assembly of Quebec from 1997 to 2007. She was a member of the Quebec Liberal Party caucus.

== Early life ==
Lamquin-Éthier was born December 12, 1946, in Montreal, Quebec, to Roland Lamquin, a physician, and Simone Richer LaFlèche, a nurse. She graduated with a law degree from the Université de Montréal in 1976 and was admitted to the Bar of Quebec in 1978.

Lamquin-Étheir worked as a lawyer in private practice from 1978 to 1986. She was a member of the complaints examination committee of the Montreal Police Department from 1978 to 1982 and the General Manager of the Provincial Healthcare Users Committee from 1986 to 1997.

== Political career ==
Lamquin-Étheir was elected to the constituency of Bourassa in a by-election in 1997 as a member of the Quebec Liberal Party. She represented the riding until 2003, when it ceased to exist as a result of redistribution. In that year's provincial election, she was re-elected in the constituency of Crémazie. Following the Quebec Liberal Party's victory in the 2003 election, she served as deputy government house leader from April 2003 to October 2005 and again from December 2005 to February 2007.

She was defeated by Lisette Lapointe of the Parti Québécois in the 2007 election.

== Personal life ==
Lamquin-Étheir is married and has three sons.

== Electoral record ==
2007 Quebec general election
Party	Candidate	Votes	%	±%
Parti Québécois	Lisette Lapointe	12,388	36.00	-3.92
Liberal	Michèle Lamquin-Éthier	12,218	35.51	-8.75
Action démocratique	Geneviève Tousignant	5,540	16.10	+4.51
Québec solidaire	André Frappier	2,218	6.45	+4.49*
Green	Nathalie Gingras	1,934	5.62	+4.48
Marxist–Leninist	Marsha Fine	112	0.33	+0.07
Total valid votes		34,410	99.00	–
Total rejected ballots		349	1.00	–
Turnout		34,759	73.84	+0.41
Electors on the lists		47,076	–	–

2003 Quebec general election
Party	Candidate	Votes	%	±%
Liberal	Michèle Lamquin-Éthier	15,498	44.26	-0.08
Parti Québécois	Hugues Cormier	13,979	39.92	-5.43
Action démocratique	Manon St-Louis	4,057	11.59	+3.21
UFP	Jocelyne Desautels	686	1.96	–
Green	Claude Trudel	399	1.14	–
Bloc Pot	Philippe Beauvais	306	0.87	+0.17
Marxist–Leninist	Marsha Fine	90	0.26	–
Total valid votes		35,015	98.63	–
Total rejected ballots		485	1.37	–
Turnout		35,500	73.43	–
Electors on the lists		48,344	–	–

1998 Quebec general election: Bourassa
Party	Candidate	Votes	%
Liberal	Michèle Lamquin-Éthier (incumbent)	13,434	53.92
Parti Québécois	Claudel Toussaint	8,358	33.55
Action démocratique	Éric Morasse	2,734	10.97
Socialist Democracy	Marc Lajeunesse	189	0.76
Communist	George Manolis	121	0.49
Innovator	Raymond Robitaille	78	0.31
Total valid votes		24,914	100.00
Total rejected ballots		355	
Turnout		25,269	78.46
Electors		32,205	
Source: Official Results, Le Directeur général des élections du Québec.

1997 Bourassa By-election
Party	Candidate	Votes	%	±%
Liberal	Michèle Lamquin-Éthier	8652	59.72	+9.81
Parti Québécois	Claudel Toussaint	4070	28.81	-11.32
Action démocratique	Éric Morasse	1456	10.08	+1.57
CANADA!	Deepak Massand	145	1.01	–
Parti innovateur du Québec	Raymond Robitaille	98	0.68	+0.17
Socialist Democracy	Dimitri Sampanidis	48	0.33	–
