= Diane De Courcy =

Canadian politician

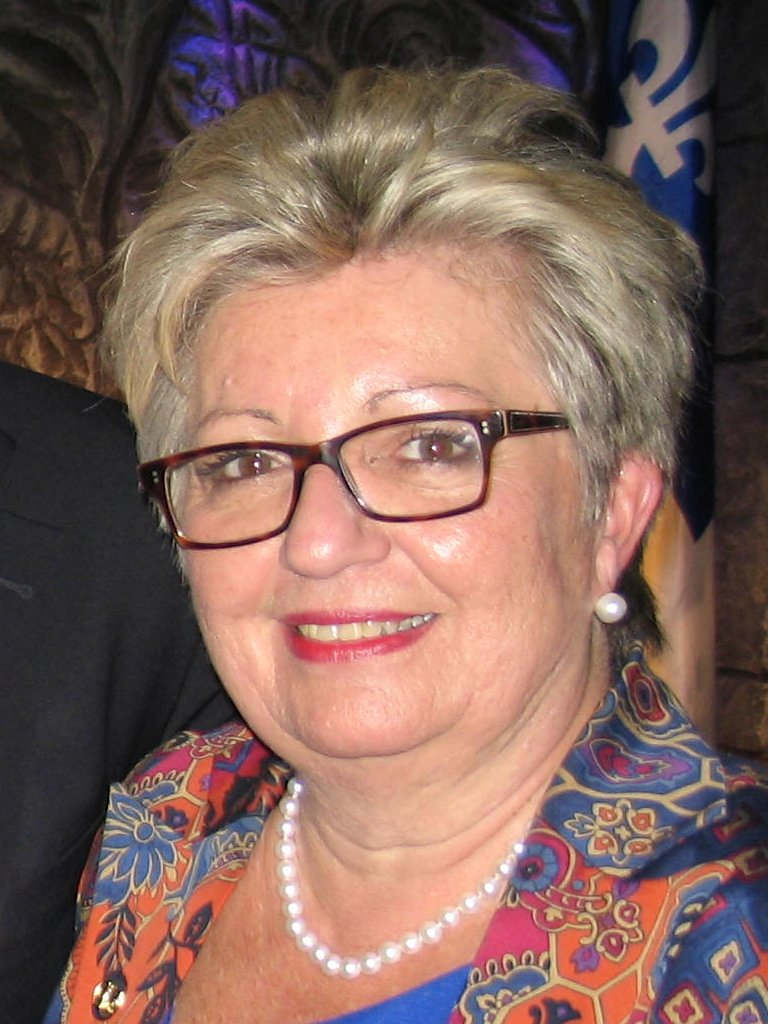

Member of the National Assembly of Quebec for Crémazie
- In office September 4, 2012 – April 7, 2014
- Preceded by: Lisette Lapointe
- Succeeded by: Marie Montpetit

Personal details
- Party: Parti Québécois

Diane De Courcy (French pronunciation: [djan d(ə) kuʁsi]) is a Canadian politician who served as the member of the National Assembly of Quebec for the riding of Crémazie from 2012 to 2014 as a member of the Parti Québécois.

== Career ==
Prior to entering politics, De Courcy served as president of the Commission scolaire de Montreal from 1998 to 2012.

De Courcy was elected as a member of the National Assembly of Quebec (MNA) for the riding of Crémazie in the 2012 Quebec election as a member of the Parti Québécois. She succeeded independent MNA Lisette Lapointe, who had retired from politics.

De Courcy served as Minister of Immigration and Cultural Communities and as Minister responsible for the Charter of the French Language. While in office, she was a central figure in the debate surrounding Bill 14, a proposed piece of legislation that would have amended the Charter of the French Language.

She was defeated by Liberal candidate Marie Montpetit in the 2014 Quebec election.
