= Maurice Clermont =

Canadian politician

MNA for Mille-Iles
- In office April 14, 2003 – December 8, 2008
- Preceded by: Lyse Leduc
- Succeeded by: Francine Charbonneau

Personal details
- Born: March 11, 1944 Laval, Quebec
- Died: February 10, 2022 (aged 77) Sainte-Adèle, Quebec
- Party: Quebec Liberal Party
- Spouse: Monique Lortie

Maurice Clermont (March 11, 1944 in Laval, Quebec - February 10, 2022 in Sainte-Adèle, Quebec) was a former Quebec politician. He was the Member of National Assembly of Quebec for the riding of Mille-Iles in the Laval region. He was a member of the Quebec Liberal Party.

Graduating from the Food Trade School, Clermont was for 23 years the owner of a local supermarket as well as a butcher. In 1986, he became an investment manager. He was also a city councillor for the Laval City Council for 20 years prior to his jump to provincial politics. He was the Leader of the Opposition for that city for 16 years. In addition, Clermont was a member of the Knights of Columbus and the Canadian Cancer Society.

Clermont was elected in 2003 in Mille-Iles and re-elected for a second term in 2007. Clermont was a backbench member for the Liberals.

== Electoral record ==
2007 Quebec general election: Mille-Îles
Party	Candidate	Votes	%	±%
Liberal	Maurice Clermont	15,978	38.74	−11.44
Action démocratique	Pierre Tremblay	11,330	27.47	+14.64
Parti Québécois	Maude Delangis	11,159	27.06	−9.04
Green	Christian Lajoie	1,511	3.66	–
Québec solidaire	Nicole Bellerose	1,169	2.83	–
Independent	Régent Millette	96	0.23	−0.05
Total valid votes		41,243	99.03	
Rejected and declined votes		402	0.97	
Turnout		41,645	75.93	−0.21
Electors on the lists		54,848		

Source: Official Results, Le Directeur général des élections du Québec.

2003 Quebec general election: Mille-Îles
Party	Candidate	Votes	%	±%
Liberal	Maurice Clermont	19,924	50.18	
Parti Québécois	Maude Delangis	14,333	36.10	
Action démocratique	Gerry La Rocca	5,093	12.83	
Independent	Christian Lajoie	244	0.61	
Christian Democracy	Régent Millette	113	0.28	
Total valid votes		39,707	98.56	
Rejected and declined votes		581	1.44	
Turnout		40,288	76.14	-8.25
Electors on the lists		52,915		

Source: Official Results, Le Directeur général des élections du Québec.
