= Manon Blanchet =

Canadian politician (born 1968)

Member of the National Assembly of Quebec for Crémazie
- In office 1998–2003
- Preceded by: Jean Campeau
- Succeeded by: Michèle Lamquin-Éthier

Personal details
- Born: May 10, 1968 (age 58) Montreal, Quebec, Canada
- Party: Parti Québécois
- Occupation: Banker

Manon Blanchet (French pronunciation: [manɔ̃ blɑ̃ʃɛ]; born May 10, 1968) is a Canadian politician who served in the National Assembly of Quebec for Crémazie from 1998 to 2003. She is a member of the Parti Québécois (PQ).

== Early life ==
Blanchet was born in Montreal, Quebec in 1968. She received her bachelor's degree in political science and public administration from Université de Montreal in 1990, and later worked for the Ministry of Municipal Affairs and in the finance department of Universite de Montreal.

During this time, she also served as a bank teller with Caisse Desjardins at their branch in Saint-André-Apôtre.

== Member of the National Assembly ==
As an aide to Crémazie MNA Jean Campeau, Blanchet was easily elected in Crémazie when he retired in 1998. With the Parti Québécois forming the government, Blanchet became parliamentary assistant for the Minister of Labour. She served in that position until 2001, when she became assistant whip of the party.

She decided not to run again in the 2003 election, and the riding was won by Michèle Lamquin-Éthier of the Liberals.

== Post-National Assembly ==
After her time in the National Assembly, Blanchet returned to banking, serving as a teller at the Caisse Desjardins in Saint-Eustache Deux-Montagnes from 2005 to 2013. She would later return to politics in the background. When Lucie Papineau resigned her position as chief of staff for Nicole Leger, the Ministry of Families as a result of the Charbonneau Commission, Blanchet stepped in to take her place. Blanchet worked for Minister Leger until 2013, and in 2015 became chief of staff for Harold LeBel, the chief opposition whip.

She supported Pierre Karl Péladeau in the 2015 Parti Québécois leadership election.
