= Yvon Charbonneau =

Canadian politician

The Honourable Yvon Charbonneau PC

Member of Parliament for Anjou—Rivière-des-Prairies
- In office 1997–2004
- Preceded by: Roger Pomerleau
- Succeeded by: Riding abolished

Member of the National Assembly of Quebec for Bourassa
- In office 1994–1997
- Preceded by: Louise Robic
- Succeeded by: Michèle Lamquin-Éthier

Personal details
- Born: July 11, 1940 Mont-Saint-Michel, Quebec, Canada
- Died: April 22, 2016 (aged 75) Plantation, Florida, U.S.
- Party: Liberal
- Spouse: Raja Hammoud
- Children: 3
- Profession: Ambassador, consultant, professor, unionist

Yvon Charbonneau (July 11, 1940 – April 22, 2016) was a Canadian trade unionist and politician who served as the member of Parliament for the riding of Anjou—Rivière-des-Prairies from 1997 to 2004 as a member of the Liberal Party of Canada. Charbonneau also served as a member of the National Assembly of Quebec for the riding of Bourassa from 1994 to 1997 as a member of the Quebec Liberal Party.

Before entering politics, Charbonneau served as president of the Centrale de l'enseignement du Québec (CEQ) for most of the 1970s and 1980s. In 1972, he was jailed for defying a back-to-work order during a strike of Quebec's public service employees.

== Early life and career ==
Yvon Charbonneau was born July 11, 1940, in Mont-Saint-Michel, Quebec, to Léopold Charbonneau, a carpenter, and Yvonne Beauchamp. The family later moved to Mont-Laurier, where he attended the Séminaire de Mont-Laurier.

Charbonneau earned a bachelor's degree in education from the University of Montreal in 1961 and taught French from 1961 to 1969. He earned his master's degree in literature from the University of Montreal in 1968. He obtained a second master's degree in political science from Laval University in 1980 and he completed doctoral coursework at the Université du Québec à Montréal in 1981.

Charbonneau served as president of the Centrale de l'enseignement du Québec (CEQ) from 1970 to 1978 and again from 1982 to 1988. In 1972, Charbonneau, along with Louis Laberge, president of the Fédération des travailleurs du Québec, and Marcel Pepin, president of the Confédération des syndicats nationaux, called for a general strike of public service employees. After the Bourassa government passed a back-to-work order, Charbonneau and his counterparts encouraged their members to ignore the order and continue the strike. On May 8, the three men were sentenced to a year in prison for contempt of court, though they were released on May 25 pending an appeal. On February 4, 1973, the Supreme Court of Canada upheld the sentence and the three men served an additional four-and-a-half months before being released on parole.

After leaving the CEQ, Charbonneau served as president of the Commission of Inquiry on Hazardous Waste from 1989 to 1990. From 1990 to 1992, he served as vice president of public relations for SNC-Lavalin. In 1992, he became president of Premier et Consult Enjeu, a public relations firm. He also served as vice-president of planning and development at the Société québécoise de développement de la main-d'œuvre from 1993 to 1994.

Charbonneau and his wife, Raja Hammoud, had three children.

== Political career ==
=== Provincial politics ===
In the 1994 Quebec election, Charbonneau was elected to represent the riding of Bourassa as a member of the Quebec Liberal Party. He served as vice-chair of the Committee on Education from December 1, 1994, to April 8, 1997. He resigned on May 2, 1997, to run in the federal election.

=== Federal politics ===
In the 1997 federal election, Charbonneau was elected to represent the riding of Anjou—Rivière-des-Prairies as a member of the Liberal Party of Canada, defeating Bloc Québécois incumbent Roger Pomerleau. He was re-elected in the 2000 election. In Parliament, he was Parliamentary Secretary to the Deputy Prime Minister and Minister of Public Safety and Emergency Preparedness with special emphasis on Emergency Preparedness, and Parliamentary Secretary to the Minister of Health.

He did not run in the 2004 election.

== Later life ==
Following his departure from politics, Charbonneau was appointed Canada's ambassador to UNESCO in 2004. His appointment drew criticism from the Canadian Jewish Congress, who noted he had been critical of the Israeli government. He was removed from the position in September 2006 after the Conservative Party took power earlier that year.

Charbonneau died in Plantation, Florida on April 22, 2016, following a stroke he suffered on April 7. He had finished writing his memoirs shortly before his death. They were published posthumously as Cartes sur table : syndicalisme, politique, diplomatie in September 2016.

== Published works ==
- Cartes sur table – Charbonneau, Yvon (2016). Cartes sur table : Syndicalisme, politique, diplomatie. Montreal: M Editeur. ISBN 978-2924327524.

== Electoral record ==
2000 Canadian federal election: Anjou–Rivière-des-Prairies
Party	Candidate	Votes	%
Liberal	Yvon Charbonneau	28,134	57.86
Bloc Québécois	Jacques Dagenais	14,755	30.35
Progressive Conservative	Michel Tanguay	2,034	4.18
Alliance	Gianni Chiazzese	2,005	4.12
Marijuana	Normand Néron	918	1.89
New Democratic	Bruce Whelan	624	1.28
Marxist–Leninist	Hélène Héroux	151	0.31
Total valid votes		48,621	100
Total rejected ballots		1,134	
Turnout		49,755	66.61
Electors on the lists		74,695	
Sources: Official Results, Elections Canada and Financial Returns, Elections Canada.

1997 Canadian federal election
Party	Candidate	Votes	%	±%
Liberal	Yvon Charbonneau	24,189	47.31	+5.09
Bloc Québécois	Roger Pomerleau	16,558	32.38	-10.72
Progressive Conservative	Jean Corbeil	9,405	18.39	+6.75
New Democratic	Elizabeth Lemay Amabili	752	1.47	-0.11
Marxist–Leninist	Yves Le Seigle	227	0.44	–
Total valid votes		51,131	100.00	

1994 Quebec general election: Bourassa
Party	Candidate	Votes	%	±%
Liberal	Yvon Charbonneau	12,963	49.91	-6.61
Parti Québécois	Pierre Séguin	10,423	40.13	+3.67
Action démocratique	Gilles Guibord	2210	8.51	–
Natural Law	Miville Couture	246	0.95	–
Parti innovateur du Québec	Raymond Robitaille	132	0.51	–
