= Madwa-Nika Cadet =

Canadian politician

Madwa-Nika Cadet MNA

Member of the National Assembly of Quebec for Bourassa-Sauvé
- Incumbent
- Assumed office October 3, 2022
- Preceded by: Paule Robitaille

Personal details
- Born: 1990 Montreal
- Party: Quebec Liberal Party

Madwa-Nika Phanord-Cadet, better known as Madwa-Nika Cadet, is a Canadian politician, who was elected to the National Assembly of Quebec in the 2022 Quebec general election. She represents the riding of Bourassa-Sauvé as a member of the Quebec Liberal Party.

As of September 7, 2024, she serves as the critic for Employment, Labour, Youth, and French Language.

== Electoral record ==
2022 Quebec general election: Bourassa-Sauvé
Party	Candidate	Votes	%	±%
Liberal	Madwa-Nika Cadet	9,704	40.13	-6.03
Coalition Avenir Québec	Absa Diallo	6,049	25.01	+1.53
Québec solidaire	Ricardo Gustave	3,737	15.45	+1.47
Conservative	Carmel-Antoine Bessard	2,161	8.94	+7.48
Parti Québécois	Zacharie Robitaille	2,101	8.69	-1.95
Green	Omar Ahmed	266	1.10	-0.64
Independent	Smaille Toussaint	94	0.39	–
Parti accès propriété et équité	Shawn Lalande McLean	70	0.29	–
Total valid votes		24,182	97.79	–
Total rejected ballots		547	2.21	–
Turnout		24,729	53,46	
Electors on the lists		46,257	–	–

2012 Quebec general election: Rosemont
Party	Candidate	Votes	%	±%
Parti Québécois	Jean-François Lisée	16,780	43.67	−6.99
Liberal	Madwa-Nika Phanord-Cadet	7,836	20.39	−11.42
Coalition Avenir Québec	Léo Fradette	6,657	17.33	+11.03
Québec solidaire	François Saillant	5,564	14.48	+6.26
Option nationale	Johanne Lavoie	1,079	2.81	–
Bloc Pot	Raynald St-Onge	220	0.57	–
Coalition pour la constituante	Daniel Guersan	160	0.42	–
Marxist–Leninist	Stéphane Chénier	127	0.33	+0.04
Total valid votes		38,423	98.85	–
Total rejected ballots		446	1.15	–
Turnout		38,869	76.10	+17.43
Electors		51,073	–	–
Parti Québécois hold		Swing		−9.21
Source: Official Results, Le Directeur général des élections du Québec. The CAQ percentage change totals are compared to the Action démocratique du Québec results from 2008.
