= Marie Montpetit =

Canadian politician (born 1979)

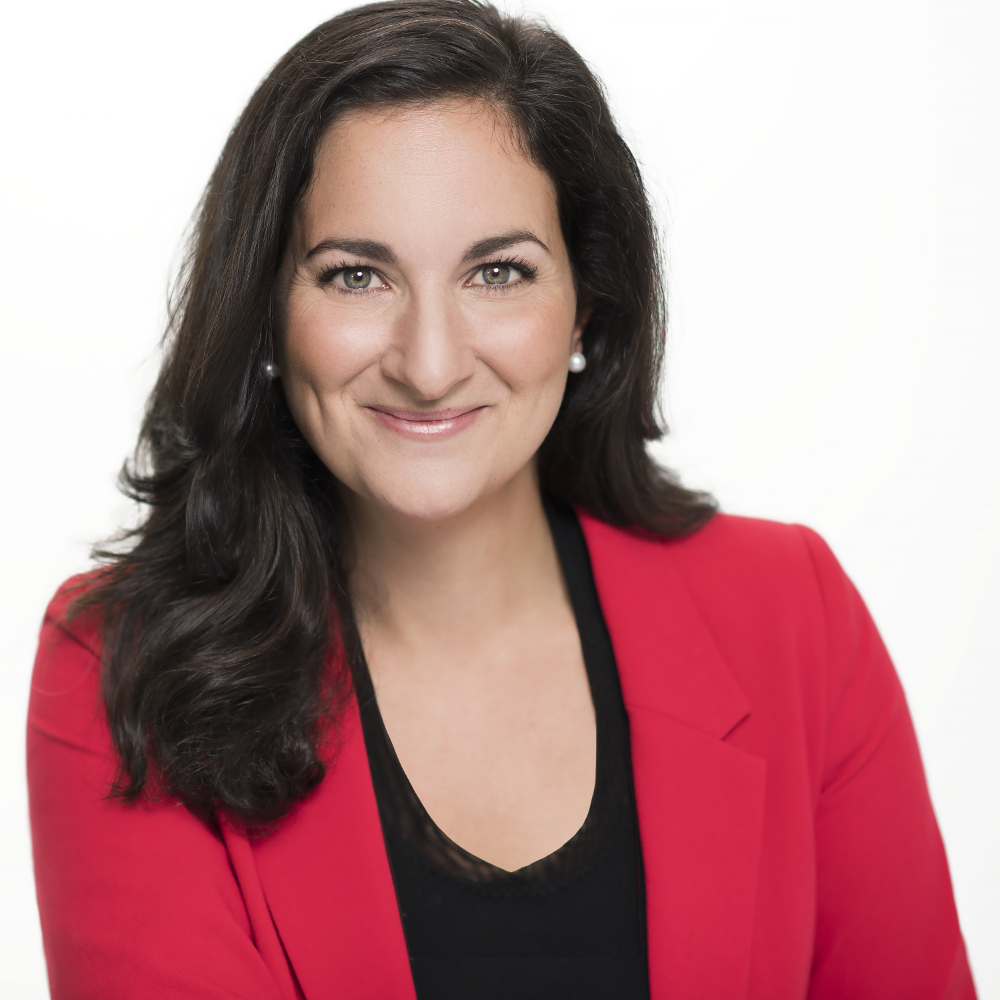

Member of the National Assembly of Quebec for Maurice-Richard Crémazie (2014–2018)
- In office April 7, 2014 – August 28, 2022
- Preceded by: Diane De Courcy
- Succeeded by: Haroun Bouazzi

Quebec Minister of Culture and Communications
- In office October 11, 2017 – October 18, 2018
- Premier: Philippe Couillard
- Preceded by: Luc Fortin
- Succeeded by: Nathalie Roy

Quebec Minister for the French language
- In office October 11, 2017 – October 18, 2018
- Premier: Philippe Couillard
- Preceded by: Luc Fortin
- Succeeded by: Nathalie Roy

Personal details
- Born: August 6, 1979 (age 47) Montreal, Quebec, Canada
- Party: Quebec Liberal Party (2014–2021); Independent (2021–present)

Marie Montpetit (French pronunciation: [maʁi mɔ̃p(ə)ti]; born August 6, 1979) is a Canadian politician who represented the riding of Maurice-Richard (formerly known as Crémazie) National Assembly of Quebec from 2014 to 2022. First elected as a member of the Quebec Liberal Party in the 2014 election, she became an independent in 2021. During her time in office, she served as both Minister of Culture and Communications and as Minister for the French language.

== Career ==
Prior to her election to the legislature, Montpetit worked for the provincial Ministry of Health and Social Services and the World Health Organization.

Montpetit was elected as the member of the National Assembly of Quebec for Crémazie in the 2014 election as a member of the Quebec Liberal Party.

From October 2017 to October 2018, she was Minister of culture and communications and Minister responsible for the protection and promotion of the French Language.

She was re-elected by a slim margin in the 2018 Quebec election. On November 1, 2021, Montpetit was expelled from the Liberal caucus following anonymous allegations of harassment. However, the National Assembly confirmed that there were no complaints against Montpetit.

On May 24, 2022, Montpetit announced that she would not be seeking a third term in the 2022 election.

On May 30, 2024, she was appointed as the head of the Fédération des Cégeps, which regroups 48 colleges throughout the province.

== Electoral history ==
2018 Quebec general election: Maurice-Richard
Party	Candidate	Votes	%	±%
Liberal	Marie Montpetit	9,459	29.52	-9.48
Québec solidaire	Raphaël Rebelo	8,929	27.86	+14.15
Coalition Avenir Québec	Manon Gauthier	6,330	19.75	+6.02
Parti Québécois	Frédéric Lapointe	6,131	19.13	-12.47
Green	Gilles Fournelle	602	1.88	+0.58
New Democratic	Jean Rémillard	216	0.67	
Parti nul	Manon Dupuis	214	0.67	
Bloc Pot	Morgan Ali	90	0.28	
Citoyens au pouvoir	Daniel St-Hilaire	77	0.24	
Total valid votes		32,048	98.51	
Total rejected ballots		486	1.49	+0.11
Turnout		32,534	68.63	-6.38
Eligible voters		47,407		
Liberal hold		Swing		-11.82
Source(s) "Rapport des résultats officiels du scrutin". Élections Québec.

2014 Quebec general election
Party	Candidate	Votes	%	±%
Liberal	Marie Montpetit	13,440	39.00	+10.16
Parti Québécois	Diane De Courcy	10,892	31.60	-7.01
Coalition Avenir Québec	Sylvain Bessette	4,731	13.73	-3.37
Québec solidaire	André Frappier	4,726	13.71	+2.14
Green	Virginia Leurent-Bonnevie	448	1.30	-0.19
Option nationale	Gabrielle Ladouceur-Despins	227	0.66	-1.72
Total valid votes		34,464	98.61	–
Total rejected ballots		485	1.39	–
Turnout		34,949	75.00	-1.63
Electors on the lists		46,596	–	–
Liberal gain		Swing		+8.59

Quebec provincial government of Philippe Couillard
Cabinet post (1)
Predecessor	Office	Successor
Luc Fortin	Minister of Culture and Communications; October 11, 2017–October 18, 2018	Nathalie Roy
