= Sauvé (provincial electoral district) =

Coordinates: 45.61°N 73.62°W

Quebec electoral district

Defunct provincial electoral district
- Legislature: National Assembly of Quebec
- District created: 1972
- District abolished: 2001
- First contested: 1973
- Last contested: 1998

Demographics
- Census division(s): Montreal (part)
- Census subdivision(s): Montreal (part)

Sauvé (French pronunciation: [sove]) was a former provincial electoral district in the Canadian province of Quebec.

It included part of the city and later borough of Montréal-Nord.

It was created for the 1973 election from part of Bourassa electoral district. Its final election was in 1998. In the 2003 election, part of Bourassa and all of Sauvé were combined again to create Bourassa-Sauvé.

It was named after former Quebec Premier Paul Sauvé, who led the province for 100 days in 1959 after the death of Maurice Duplessis, until his own death.

== Members of the National Assembly ==
Legislature	Years	Member	Party
Riding created from Bourassa
30th	1973–1976	Jacques-Yvan Morin	Parti Québécois
31st	1976–1981	Jacques-Yvan Morin	Parti Québécois
32nd	1981–1984	Jacques-Yvan Morin	Parti Québécois
32nd	1984–1985	Marcel Parent	Liberal
33rd	1985–1989	Marcel Parent	Liberal
34th	1989–1994	Marcel Parent	Liberal
35th	1994–1998	Marcel Parent	Liberal
36th	1998–2003	Line Beauchamp	Liberal
Dissolved into Bourassa-Sauvé
