= Paule Robitaille =

Canadian politician

Member of the National Assembly of Quebec for Bourassa-Sauvé
- In office October 1, 2018 – August 28, 2022
- Preceded by: Rita de Santis
- Succeeded by: Madwa-Nika Cadet

Personal details
- Born: Quebec City, Quebec, Canada
- Party: Quebec Liberal Party

Paule Robitaille is a Canadian politician, who was elected to the National Assembly of Quebec in the 2018 provincial election. She represented the electoral district of Bourassa-Sauvé as a member of the Quebec Liberal Party until 2022.
