= Haroun Bouazzi =

Canadian politician

Member of the National Assembly of Quebec for Maurice-Richard
- In office October 3, 2022 – August 27, 2026
- Preceded by: Marie Montpetit
- Succeeded by: Nada Boumeftah

Personal details
- Born: 1979 (age 46–47) Tunis, Tunisia
- Party: Québec solidaire
- Education: Polytechnique Montréal

Haroun Bouazzi is a Canadian politician who served as the member National Assembly of Quebec for the riding of Maurice-Richard from 2022 to 2026. He was a member of Québec solidaire.

Bouazzi was elected in the 2022 Quebec general election. Following his election, he became the critic responsible for Finance, Economy and Innovation, Energy, Cybersecurity and Digital Affairs, and International Relations and Francophonie. He received criticism for his remarks on alleged acts of racism by fellow MNAs in 2024. He did not seek re-election in the 2026 general election.

== Electoral record ==
2022 Quebec general election: Maurice-Richard
Party	Candidate	Votes	%	±%
Québec solidaire	Haroun Bouazzi	10,903	34.67	+6.81
Coalition Avenir Québec	Audrey Murray	8,542	27.16	+7.41
Liberal	Jonathan Marleau	5,414	17.22	-12.30
Parti Québécois	Chantal Jorg	4,612	14.67	-4.46
Conservative	Louise Sexton	1,322	4.20	–
Green	Gilles Fournelle	311	0.99	-0.89
Bloc Montreal	Andrea Di Stefano	145	0.46	–
Independent	Kassandre Chéry Théodat	115	0.37	–
Climat Québec	Patrick Bouchardy	83	0.26	–
Total valid votes		31,447	98.69	–
Total rejected ballots		419	1.31	-0.18
Turnout		31,866	68.36	-0.27
Electors on the lists		46,618	–	–
Québec solidaire gain from Liberal		Swing		+9.55
