= Lisette Lapointe =

Canadian politician (born 1943)

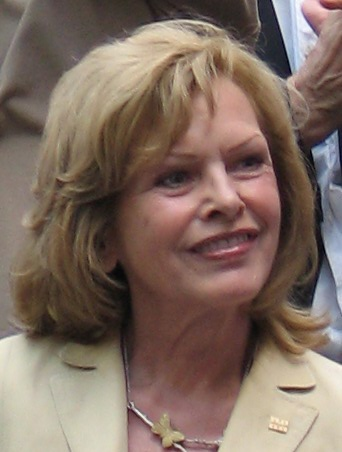

MNA for Crémazie
- In office April 25, 2007 – 2012
- Preceded by: Michèle Lamquin-Éthier
- Succeeded by: Diane De Courcy

Personal details
- Born: September 13, 1943 (age 83) Montreal, Quebec
- Party: Parti Québécois (2007-2011); Independent (2011-present)
- Spouse: Jacques Parizeau
- Profession: journalist, teacher
- Portfolio: Employment, Social Solidarity, Professional formation

Lisette Lapointe (born September 13, 1943 in Montreal, Quebec) is a Quebec politician, journalist and teacher, who sat in the Quebec National Assembly first as a Parti Québécois MNA and then as an Independent. She is the widow of Jacques Parizeau, former Premier of Quebec, Canada. She was first elected to the National Assembly of Quebec as a candidate for the Parti Québécois in the provincial riding of Crémazie in the 2007 general election.

Prior to her entry into politics, following in the footsteps of her husband, Lapointe worked as a teacher at the secondary level. She was also the director of a health and safety organization in the automobile industry, a journalist at a Mascouche newspaper and was the political aide for the Minister of Social Development and the former MNA of L'Assomption.

After the 2007 elections, she was named on April 25, 2007 the PQ's critic in employment and social solidarity.

On June 6, 2011, Lapointe and caucus mates Louise Beaudoin and Pierre Curzi resigned from the Parti Québécois to sit as independents over the PQ's acceptance of a bill changing the law to permit an agreement between the City of Québec and Quebecor Inc. concerning the construction of an arena in Quebec City. In November 2011, several media outlets reported that she joined the new sovereigntist party Option nationale, led by fellow former PQ caucus member Jean-Martin Aussant. However, while she has bought a membership card from the party, she also retained her membership in the Parti Québécois, and continued to sit as an independent.

On March 4, 2012 she announced that she would not run for re-election and left the National Assembly at the September 2012 provincial election. She subsequently served as mayor of Saint-Adolphe-d'Howard from 2013 to 2017.
