= Francine Charbonneau =

Canadian politician (born 1962)

Member of the National Assembly of Quebec for Mille-Îles
- In office December 8, 2008 – August 28, 2022
- Preceded by: Maurice Clermont
- Succeeded by: Virginie Dufour

Personal details
- Born: March 22, 1962 (age 64) Montreal, Quebec, Canada
- Party: Liberal
- Spouse: Christian Simard
- Occupation: education administrator

Francine Charbonneau (born 22 March 1962) is a Canadian politician. Charbonneau was elected to represent the riding of Mille-Îles in the National Assembly of Quebec in the 2008 provincial election, and was then re-elected in 2012 and 2014. She is a member of the Quebec Liberal Party.

Prior to her election, Charbonneau was the president of the Laval School Board but was first elected to the board as commissioner in 1998 for the Sainte-Rose ward. She was a board member of various Laval associations including the regional development commission, Histoire Laval, the Regional Television and the Club des Petits dejeuners de Laval.

== Electoral record ==
2018 Quebec general election
Party	Candidate	Votes	%	±%
Liberal	Francine Charbonneau	10,408	35.82	
Coalition Avenir Québec	Mauro Barone	9,202	31.67	
Parti Québécois	Michel Lachance	4,378	15.07	
Québec solidaire	Jean Trudelle	3,711	12.77	
Green	Alain Joseph	822	2.83	
Parti libre	Dwayne Cappelletti	403	1.39	
Bloc Pot	Jason D'Aoust	134	0.46	
Total valid votes		29,058	100.0	
Total rejected ballots		439		
Turnout		66.47%		
Eligible voters		44,374		

2014 Quebec general election
Party	Candidate	Votes	%	±%
Liberal	Francine Charbonneau	16,499	50.50	
Parti Québécois	Djemila Benhabib	8,339	25.52	
Coalition Avenir Québec	Sylvain Loranger	5,757	17.62	
Québec solidaire	Anik Paradis	1,545	4.73	-
Green	Bianca Jitaru	348	1.07	
Conservative	David Mirabella	98	0.30	
Option nationale	Maël Rieussec	84	0.26	
Total valid votes		32,670		–
Total rejected ballots		417	1.26%	–
Turnout		33,087	77.30%	
Electors on the lists		42,804	–	–

Source: Official Results, Le Directeur général des élections du Québec.

2012 Quebec general election
Party	Candidate	Votes	%	±%
Liberal	Francine Charbonneau	11,908	37.36	-9.40
Parti Québécois	Robert Carrier	10,138	31.81	-4.61
Coalition Avenir Québec	Jean Prud'homme	7,420	23.28	
Québec solidaire	Nicole Bellerose	1,508	4.73	+2.03
Green	Henrico Negro	376	1.18	-1.53
Option nationale	Alain Sénécal	352	1.10	
Independent	Régent Millette	121	0.38	
Union citoyenne	Carlos Silva	52	0.16	
Total valid votes				–
Total rejected ballots				–
Turnout				
Electors on the lists			–	–

2008 Quebec general election: Mille-Îles
Party	Candidate	Votes	%	±%
Liberal	Francine Charbonneau	15,628	46.76	+8.02
Parti Québécois	Donato Centomo	12,172	36.42	+9.36
Action démocratique	Pierre Tremblay	3,585	10.73	−16.74
Green	Maude Delangis	905	2.71	−0.95
Québec solidaire	Nicole Bellerose	901	2.70	−0.13
Independent	Isabelle Gérin-Lajoie	186	0.56	–
Independent	Régent Millette	44	0.13	−0.10
Total valid votes		33,421	98.46	
Rejected and declined votes		523	1.54	
Turnout		33,944	60.66	−15.27
Electors on the lists		55,956		

Source: Official Results, Le Directeur général des élections du Québec.
