= Guy Joron =

Canadian politician (1940–2017)

- Born: June 2, 1940; Montreal, Quebec
- Died: December 28, 2017 (aged 77)
- Education: Université de Montréal
- Occupation: Politician

Guy Joron (June 2, 1940 – December 28, 2017) was a politician in Quebec, Canada.

== Background ==
He was born on June 2, 1940, in Montreal. He had a B.A. in political science from Université de Montréal.

== Member of the legislature ==
Joron successfully ran as a Parti Québécois candidate to the National Assembly of Quebec in the district of Gouin in 1970, defeating Liberal incumbent Yves Michaud. He was defeated in 1973.

He was returned to the legislature in 1976, representing the district of Mille-Îles.

Alongside caucus colleague Claude Charron, he was one of the first two known gay members of the National Assembly. Neither man was out to the general public during his time in politics, although both were out among their colleagues in the assembly.

== Cabinet Member ==
In 1976, Joron was appointed to Premier René Lévesque's Cabinet. He served as Minister responsible for Energy until 1979 and Minister of Cooperatives and Financial Institutions from 1979 to 1980. Joron resigned his seat and retired from politics in 1981.

== Footnotes ==
National Assembly of Quebec
Preceded by Yves Michaud (Liberal)	MNA for Gouin; 1970–1973	Succeeded by Jean-Marie Beauregard (Liberal)
Preceded by Bernard Lachance (Liberal)	MNA for Mille-Îles; 1976–1981	Succeeded by Jean-Paul Champagne (Parti Québécois)
