= Bourassa-Sauvé =

Provincial electoral district in Quebec, Canada

Coordinates: 45.6145°N 73.6163°W

Quebec electoral district
- Location in Montreal

Provincial electoral district
- Legislature: National Assembly of Quebec
MNA
Madwa-Nika Cadet
Liberal
- District created: 2001
- First contested: 2003
- Last contested: 2026

Demographics
- Population (2006): 77,497
- Electors (2014): 47,769
- Area (km²): 11.3
- Pop. density (per km²): 6,858.1
- Census division: Montreal (part)
- Census subdivision: Montreal (part)

Bourassa-Sauvé (French pronunciation: [buʁasa sove]) is a provincial electoral district in Quebec, Canada, that elects members to the National Assembly of Quebec. It is located within Montreal and consists of most of the borough of Montréal-Nord.

It was created for the 2003 election from parts of Bourassa and Sauvé.

In the change from the 2001 to the 2011 electoral map, its territory was unchanged.

== Members of the National Assembly ==
Legislature	Years	Member	Party
Riding created from Bourassa and Sauvé
37th	2003–2007	Line Beauchamp	Liberal
38th	2007–2008	Line Beauchamp	Liberal
39th	2008–2012	Line Beauchamp	Liberal
40th	2012–2014	Rita de Santis	Liberal
41st	2014–2018	Rita de Santis	Liberal
42nd	2018–2022	Paule Robitaille	Liberal
43rd	2022–2026	Madwa-Nika Cadet	Liberal
44th	2026–Present	Madwa-Nika Cadet	Liberal

== Election results ==
2026 Quebec general election
** Preliminary results — Not yet official **
Party	Candidate	Votes	%	±%
Liberal	Madwa-Nika Cadet	10,428	47.39	+7.26
Québec solidaire	Mara Hermione Pierre	3,718	16.90	+1.45
Parti Québécois	Edline Henri	3,596	16.34	+7.40
Conservative	Ismaila Marega	2,074	9.43	+0.49
Coalition Avenir Québec	Isabelle Lamy	2,064	9.38	–15.63
Independent	Joseph Wa Ngoie Ngoie	125	0.57	N/A
Total valid votes		22,005	97.46	+0.33
Total rejected ballots		574	2.54	–0.33
Turnout		22,579	50.98	–2.48
Electors on the lists		44,289		
Liberal hold		Swing		+2.91
Source: Élections Québec

2022 Quebec general election
Party	Candidate	Votes	%	±%
Liberal	Madwa-Nika Cadet	9,704	40.13	-6.03
Coalition Avenir Québec	Absa Diallo	6,049	25.01	+1.53
Québec solidaire	Ricardo Gustave	3,737	15.45	+1.47
Conservative	Carmel-Antoine Bessard	2,161	8.94	+7.48
Parti Québécois	Zacharie Robitaille	2,101	8.69	-1.95
Green	Omar Ahmed	266	1.10	-0.64
Independent	Smaille Toussaint	94	0.39	–
Parti accès propriété et équité	Shawn Lalande McLean	70	0.29	–
Total valid votes		24,182	97.79	–
Total rejected ballots		547	2.21	–
Turnout		24,729	53,46	
Electors on the lists		46,257	–	–

2018 Quebec general election
Party	Candidate	Votes	%	±%
Liberal	Paule Robitaille	11,456	46.16	-14.32
Coalition Avenir Québec	Julie Séide	5,826	23.48	+11.24
Québec solidaire	Alejandra Zaga Mendez	3,469	13.98	+8.08
Parti Québécois	Karine Gauvin	2,640	10.64	-8.43
Green	Karina Barros	433	1.74	+0.55
Conservative	Michel Boissonneault	363	1.46	–
New Democratic	Abed Louis	219	0.88	–
Bloc Pot	Jean-François Brunet	177	0.71	-0.01
CINQ	Sabrinel Laouadi	142	0.57	–
Independent	Jean Marie Floriant Ndzana	92	0.37	–
Total valid votes		24,817	97.39	
Total rejected ballots		666	2.61	
Turnout		25,483	52.44	-10.69
Eligible voters		48,592		
Liberal hold		Swing		-12.78
Source(s) "Rapport des résultats officiels du scrutin". Élections Québec.

2014 Quebec general election
Party	Candidate	Votes	%	±%
Liberal	Rita de Santis	17,905	60.48	+18.20
Parti Québécois	Leila Mahiout	5,646	19.07	-8.26
Coalition Avenir Québec	Fabrizio Del Fabbro	3,624	12.24	-5.20
Québec solidaire	Claude Généreux	1,747	5.90	-4.38
Green	Adam Aberra	351	1.19	-0.38
Bloc Pot	Jean-François Brunet	214	0.72	–
Option nationale	Félix Luthu	119	0.40	-0.69
Total valid votes		29,606	98.17	–
Total rejected ballots		552	1.83	–
Turnout		30,158	63.13	-1.04
Electors on the lists		47,769	–	–

2012 Quebec general election
Party	Candidate	Votes	%	±%
Liberal	Rita de Santis	12,518	42.28	-19.05
Parti Québécois	Marianne Dessureault	8,092	27.33	+0.46
Coalition Avenir Québec	Louis Pelletier	5,165	17.44	+8.88
Québec solidaire	Will Prosper	3,045	10.28	+7.04
Green	Eric Guerra-Grenier Jr.	465	1.57	
Option nationale	Nancy Lavallée	324	1.09	–
Total valid votes		29,609	98.10	–
Total rejected ballots		575	1.90	–
Turnout		30,184	64.17	+16.49
Electors on the lists		47,036	–	–

^ CAQ change is from ADQ

2008 Quebec general election
Party	Candidate	Votes	%	±%
Liberal	Line Beauchamp	13,950	61.33	+11.25
Parti Québécois	Roland Carrier	6,111	26.87	+4.10
Action démocratique	Guy Mailloux	1,947	8.56	-11.88
Québec solidaire	Enrico Gambardella	738	3.24	-0.10
Total valid votes		22,746	97.97	–
Total rejected ballots		471	2.03	–
Turnout		23,217	47.68	-15.43
Electors on the lists		48,694	–	–

2007 Quebec general election
Party	Candidate	Votes	%	±%
Liberal	Line Beauchamp	15,631	50.08	-10.99
Parti Québécois	Roland Carrier	7,105	22.77	-2.18
Action démocratique	Guy Mailloux	6,379	20.44	+9.02
Québec solidaire	Marie-Noëlle Doucet-Paquin	1,043	3.34	-
Green	Marie-Ange Germain	891	2.85	+1.86
Independent	Charles-Antoine Gabriel	160	0.51	-
Total valid votes		31,209	98.27	–
Total rejected ballots		550	1.73	–
Turnout		31,759	63.11	-1.11
Electors on the lists		50,323	–	–

2003 Quebec general election
Party	Candidate	Votes	%
Liberal	Line Beauchamp	20,175	61.07
Parti Québécois	Kettly Beauregard	8,243	24.95
Action démocratique	Michelle Allaire	3,771	11.42
Green	Francis Mallette	327	0.99
Independent	Sylvain Archambault	261	0.79
Christian Democracy	Denis Gagné	119	0.36
Marxist–Leninist	Claude Brunelle	94	0.28
Equality	Boris Mospan	44	0.13
Total valid votes		33,034	98.29
Total rejected ballots		573	1.71
Turnout		33,607	64.22
Electors on the lists		52,332	–

== See also ==
- List of Quebec provincial electoral districts
- Canadian provincial electoral districts
