= Rita de Santis =

Canadian politician

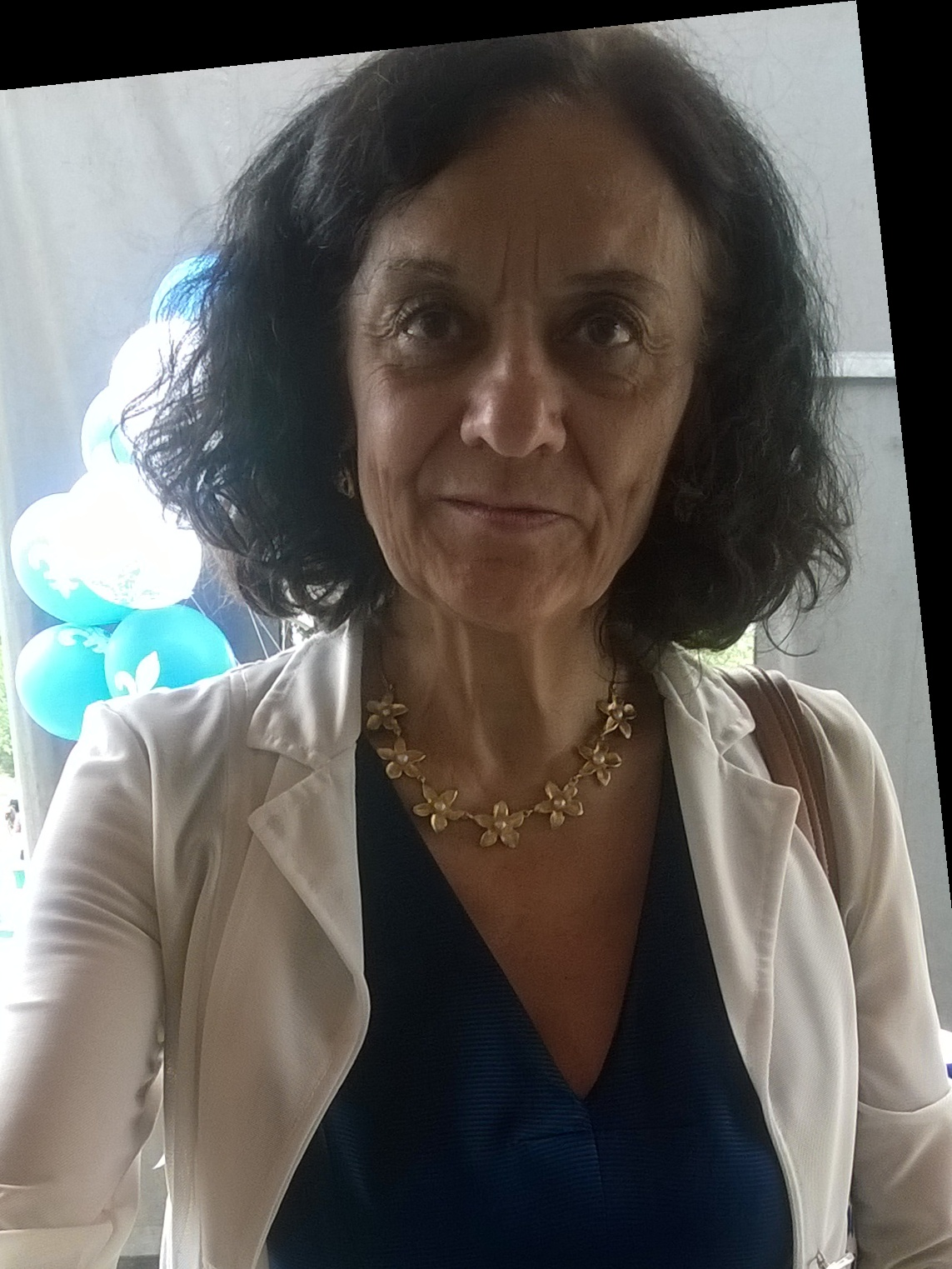
- de Santis in 2018

Member of the National Assembly of Quebec for Bourassa-Sauvé
- In office September 4, 2012 – August 29, 2018
- Preceded by: Line Beauchamp
- Succeeded by: Paule Robitaille

Personal details
- Born: May 29, 1954 (age 72) Palmoli, Italy
- Party: Liberal

Rita de Santis is a Canadian politician, who was a member of the National Assembly of Quebec for the riding of Bourassa-Sauvé from 2012 to 2018. She was first elected in the 2012 election as a member of the Quebec Liberal Party caucus.

== Biography ==
From April 23, 2014 to January 28, 2016, she was the Parliamentary Assistant to the Minister responsible for Government Administration and Ongoing Program Review (open and transparent government).

On January 28, 2016, she was appointed to the cabinet as Minister Responsible for Access to Information and Reform of Democratic Institutions.

She retired from politics in 2018.
