= Louise Robic =

Canadian politician (1935–2020)

Member of the National Assembly of Quebec for Bourassa
- In office 1985–1994
- Preceded by: Patrice Laplante
- Succeeded by: Yvon Charbonneau

Personal details
- Born: January 25, 1935 Montreal, Quebec, Canada
- Died: March 13, 2020 (aged 85)
- Party: Quebec Liberal Party
- Spouse: Jean-Marc Robic
- Children: 3

Louise Robic (January 25, 1935 – March 13, 2020) was a Canadian politician who represented Bourassa in the Quebec National Assembly from 1985 to 1994 as a member of the Quebec Liberal Party.

== Early life ==
Robic was born on January 25, 1935, in Montreal, Quebec, the daughter of Jean-Baptiste Goyer and Berthe Trudeau. She was educated at the Notre-Dame-des-Anges convent and then took a commercial course at the Alexander Business College and a course in human relations at the Université du Québec à Montréal. She also took courses in real estate and various management courses and studied at McGill University. She worked for Air Canada, Royal Trust and the Caisse populaire.

Robic was the founding president of the Fondation pour le Refuge des femmes de l'Ouest-de-l'Île de Montréal from 1982 to 1984.

== Political career ==
Robic was an organizer for the NO campaign during the 1980 Quebec referendum and helped organize the "Yvette" gathering at the Montreal forum. From 1982 to 1985, she was president of the Quebec Liberal Party. She was elected to the Quebec assembly in 1985 and was reelected in 1989. She served in the Quebec cabinet as Minister of Cultural Communities and Immigration. She was Minister responsible for Health and Social Services and Minister responsible for financial institutions. She resigned her seat in the assembly in April 1994.

== Later life ==
From 1997 to 2007, Robic served as commissioner of the Immigration and Refugee Board of Canada.

Robic died on March 13, 2020.

== Awards and recognition ==
In 1993, Robic was named a Dame Commander of Merit in the Sovereign Military Order of Malta. In 2002, she was awarded the Queen Elizabeth II Golden Jubilee Medal.
