= Bourassa (provincial electoral district) =

Coordinates: 45.6145°N 73.6163°W

Quebec electoral district

Defunct provincial electoral district
- Legislature: National Assembly of Quebec
- District created: 1965
- District abolished: 2001
- First contested: 1966
- Last contested: 1998

Demographics
- Census division: Montreal (part)
- Census subdivision: Montreal (part)

Bourassa (French pronunciation: [buʁasa]) is a former provincial electoral district in Quebec, Canada.

It included part of the city and later borough of Montréal-Nord.

It was created for the 1966 election from part of Bourget electoral district. Its last election was in 1998. It disappeared in the 2003 election. Its successor electoral districts were Bourassa-Sauvé (formed by merging part of Bourassa with all of Sauvé electoral district) and Crémazie.

It was named after nationalist politician Henri Bourassa, who was a member of the Legislative Assembly of Quebec from 1907 to 1912 and also served in the House of Commons of Canada.

== Members of the Legislative Assembly / National Assembly ==
Legislature	Years	Member	Party
Riding created from Bourget
28th	1966–1970	Georges-Émery Tremblay	Liberal
29th	1970–1973	Georges-Émery Tremblay	Liberal
30th	1973–1976	Lise Bacon	Liberal
31st	1976–1981	Patrice Laplante	Parti Québécois
32nd	1981–1985	Patrice Laplante	Parti Québécois
33rd	1985–1989	Louise Robic	Liberal
34th	1989–1994	Louise Robic	Liberal
35th	1994–1997	Yvon Charbonneau	Liberal
35th	1997–1998	Michèle Lamquin-Éthier	Liberal
36th	1998–2003	Michèle Lamquin-Éthier	Liberal
Dissolved into Bourassa-Sauvé

== Electoral history ==
1998 Quebec general election
Party	Candidate	Votes	%	±%
Liberal	Michèle Lamquin-Éthier	13,343	53.92	-5.80
Parti Québécois	Claudel Toussaint	8358	33.55	+4.74
Action démocratique	Éric Morasse	2734	10.91	+0.83
Socialist Democracy	Marc Lajeunesse	189	0.76	+0.43
Communist	George Manolis	121	0.49	–
Parti innovateur du Québec	Raymond Robitaille	78	0.31	-0.37

1997 Bourassa By-election
Party	Candidate	Votes	%	±%
Liberal	Michèle Lamquin-Éthier	8652	59.72	+9.81
Parti Québécois	Claudel Toussaint	4070	28.81	-11.32
Action démocratique	Éric Morasse	1456	10.08	+1.57
CANADA!	Deepak Massand	145	1.01	–
Parti innovateur du Québec	Raymond Robitaille	98	0.68	+0.17
Socialist Democracy	Dimitri Sampanidis	48	0.33	–

1995 Quebec referendum
Side	Votes	%
No	17,084	56.67
Yes	13,063	43.33

1994 Quebec general election
Party	Candidate	Votes	%	±%
Liberal	Yvon Charbonneau	12,963	49.91	-6.61
Parti Québécois	Pierre Séguin	10,423	40.13	+3.67
Action démocratique	Gilles Guibord	2210	8.51	–
Natural Law	Miville Couture	246	0.95	–
Parti innovateur du Québec	Raymond Robitaille	132	0.51	–

1989 Quebec general election
Party	Candidate	Votes	%	±%
Liberal	Louise Robic	13,747	56.52	-2.57
Parti Québécois	Muriel Martin Di Battista	8868	36.46	+1.68
Independent	Rolland Gosselin	645	2.65	–
Workers	Louise Bachand	459	1.89	–
Lemon	Claude Chalifoux	406	1.67	–
Republic of Canada	François Lépine	133	0.55	+0.19
Marxist–Leninist	Jean-Pierre Ginchereau	63	0.26	–

1985 Quebec general election
Party	Candidate	Votes	%	±%
Liberal	Louise Robic	15,727	59.09	+11.70
Parti Québécois	Michel Trozzo	9258	34.78	-15.59
New Democratic	Robert Desfossés	651	2.45	–
Progressive Conservative	Pietro Marabella	533	2.00	–
Parti indépendantiste	Jean Saint-Amour	286	1.07	–
Commonwealth of Canada	Ghislain Côté	96	0.36	–
Christian Socialist	Richard Thériault	65	0.25	–

1981 Quebec general election
Party	Candidate	Votes	%	±%
Parti Québécois	Patrice Laplante	15,597	50.37	+5.43
Liberal	Augustin Roy	14,674	47.39	+9.16
Union Nationale	Charles E. Laforest	571	1.84	-12.01
United Social Credit	Rolland Boudreau	124	0.40	–

1980 Quebec referendum
Side	Votes	%
No	21,468	63.91
Yes	12,125	36.09

1976 Quebec general election
Party	Candidate	Votes	%	±%
Parti Québécois	Patrice Laplante	14,465	44.94	+4.35
Liberal	Lise Bacon	12,303	38.23	-15.58
Union Nationale	Robert Brisson	4457	13.85	+12.04
Ralliement créditiste	Paulette Danis St-Onge	601	1.87	-2.09
Parti national populaire	Carmine Ciccarelli	249	0.77	–
Communist	Vittorina Rizotto Bronzati	109	0.34	–

1973 Quebec general election
Party	Candidate	Votes	%	±%
Liberal	Lise Bacon	15,822	53.81	+8.22
Parti Québécois	Yves Michaud	11,933	40.59	-2.18
Ralliement créditiste	Réal Meloche	1,195	4.06	+1.18
Union Nationale	Serge Robert	453	1.54	-7.22

1970 Quebec general election
Party	Candidate	Votes	%	±%
Liberal	Georges-Émery Tremblay (incumbent)	22,197	45.59	
Parti Québécois	Jacques-Yvan Morin	20,826	42.77	
Union Nationale	Réal Gibeau	4,265	8.76	
Ralliement créditiste	Even Provencher	1,401	2.88	
Total valid votes		48,689	100.0	
Source: Les résultats électoraux depuis 1867, Borduas à Brome-Missisquoi, National Assembly of Quebec, accessed 22 November 2017.

1966 Quebec general election
Party	Candidate	Votes	%	±%
Liberal	Georges-Émery Tremblay	14,653	48.79	
Union Nationale	François Coron	9563	31.84	
RIN	Yves Michaud	4420	14.72	
Independent	Roland Dupont	761	2.53	
Ralliement national	Gérard Ledoux	634	2.11	
