= Lise Bacon =

Canadian politician (1934–2025)

The Honourable Lise Bacon CM GOQ

Deputy Premier of Quebec
- In office 1985–1994
- Premier: Robert Bourassa
- Preceded by: Marc-André Bédard
- Succeeded by: Monique Gagnon-Tremblay

Senator for De la Durantaye senate division
- In office September 14, 1994 – August 25, 2009
- Appointed by: Jean Chrétien
- Preceded by: Mario Beaulieu
- Succeeded by: Judith Seidman

Member of the National Assembly of Quebec for Bourassa
- In office 1973–1976
- Preceded by: Georges-Émery Tremblay
- Succeeded by: Patrice Laplante

Member of the National Assembly of Quebec for Chomedey
- In office 1981–1994
- Preceded by: District established
- Succeeded by: Thomas Mulcair

Minister of the Environment
- In office 1988–1989
- Succeeded by: Pierre Paradis

Personal details
- Born: August 25, 1934 Salaberry-de-Valleyfield, Quebec, Canada
- Died: October 29, 2025 (aged 91) Montreal, Quebec, Canada
- Party: Liberal
- Relatives: Guy Bacon (brother)
- Profession: Administrator

Lise Bacon CM GOQ (August 25, 1934 – October 29, 2025) was a Canadian politician who served as Deputy Premier of Quebec from 1985 to 1994. A member of the Quebec Liberal Party, she served as a Member of the National Assembly of Quebec (MNA) for the riding of Bourassa from 1973 to 1976 and again for the riding of Chomedey from 1981 to 1994. She was the second woman elected to the National Assembly after Marie-Claire Kirkland. She served as president of the Quebec Liberal Party from 1970 to 1973, making her the first woman elected president of a political party in Canada.

After leaving provincial politics, she served as a Senator from 1994 to 2009.

== Early life and education ==
Bacon was born in Salaberry-de-Valleyfield, Quebec, on August 25, 1934, to Joseph D. Bacon and Yvonne Jetté. Bacon attended Collège Marie-de-l'Incarnation and Académie Saint-Louis-de-Gonzague in Trois-Rivières and went on to study political science, psychology, and sociology at the Institut Albert-Thomas in Chicoutimi.

== Early career ==
Bacon worked as an Office Manager at the Prudential Insurance Company of America from 1951 to 1971.

During this time, she was active with the Quebec Liberal Party. Among other roles, she served as Treasurer of the Association des femmes libérales Louis Saint-Laurent in Trois-Rivières from 1952 to 1956, executive director of the Fédération des jeunes libéraux du Québec from 1954 to 1956, and vice-president for the Mauricie region of the Fédération des femmes libérales du Québec from 1965 to 1967. She became Secretary of the Quebec Liberal Party in 1968. From 1970 to 1973, she served as President of the Quebec Liberal Party, making her the first woman elected president of a political party in Canada.

== Political career ==
Bacon was elected as an MNA for the riding of Bourassa in the 1973 Quebec general election, becoming the second woman elected to the National Assembly of Quebec after Marie-Claire Kirkland. While in office, she served as Secretary of State for Social Affairs from 1973 to 1975, as Minister of Consumers, Co-operatives and Financial Institutions from 1975 to 1976, and as Minister of Immigration in 1976.

Bacon was defeated in the 1976 election, losing to the Parti Québécois candidate, Patrice Laplante.

Bacon worked as a citizenship judge from 1977 to 1979, then as vice-president of the Canadian Life and Health Insurance Association for Quebec from 1979 to 1981.

In the 1981 election, Bacon was elected to the riding of Chomedey and served as vice-chair of the Commission de l'aménagement et des équipements from 1984 to 1985.

She was re-elected in the 1985 election and was appointed Deputy Premier of Quebec, a post she would hold until 1994. She served as Minister of Cultural Affairs from 1985 to 1989, Minister responsible for the Charter of the French Language from 1985 to 1988, and Minister of the Environment from 1988 to 1989.

Re-elected in 1989, she served as Minister of Energy and Resources from 1989 to 1994, as well as Minister of Regional Development and Chair of the Standing Cabinet Committee on Regional Development and the Environment.

== Post-political career and appointment to Senate ==
After leaving politics in 1994, Bacon served as Governor of the Canada Post Learning Institute and as a member of the National Round Table on the Environment and the Economy.

She was appointed Senator, representing the area of De la Durantaye, Quebec, by Governor General Ray Hnatyshyn, acting on the advice of Prime Minister Jean Chrétien, on September 14, 1994. Her term ended when she took mandatory retirement on her 75th birthday, August 25, 2009.

== Death ==
Bacon died on October 29, 2025, at the age of 91.

== Honours ==
In 2003, she was made Officer of the Legion of Honour of France. In 2004, she was made a Grand Officer of the National Order of Quebec. In 2010, she was appointed a Member of the Order of Canada. In 2010, she received a Doctorate Honoris Causa from the Université de Montréal.

National Assembly of Quebec
Preceded by Marc-André Bédard	Deputy Premier of Quebec; 1985–1994	Succeeded by Monique Gagnon-Tremblay
