= Jean Campeau =

Canadian politician (1931–2025)

Jean Campeau GOQ

Member of the National Assembly of Quebec for Crémazie
- In office 1994–1998
- Preceded by: André Vallerand
- Succeeded by: Manon Blanchet

Minister of Transport of Quebec
- In office November 3, 1995 – January 25, 1996
- Premier: Jacques Parizeau
- Preceded by: Jacques Brassard
- Succeeded by: Jacques Brassard

Minister of Finance of Quebec
- In office September 26, 1994 – November 3, 1995
- Premier: Jacques Parizeau
- Preceded by: André Bourbeau
- Succeeded by: Pauline Marois

Personal details
- Born: July 6, 1931 Montreal, Quebec, Canada
- Died: February 26, 2025 (aged 93) Montreal, Quebec, Canada
- Party: Parti Québécois
- Education: Collège Sainte-Marie, HEC Montréal
- Occupation: Businessman, Politician, Economist
- Awards: Grand Officer of the National Order of Quebec (1990)

Jean Campeau, GOQ (French: [ʒɑ̃ kɑ̃po]; July 6, 1931 – February 26, 2025) was a Canadian politician, economist, and business executive. He served as the minister of finance and minister of revenue of Quebec from 1994 to 1995 and later as Minister of Transport (Quebec) from 1995 to 1996. Prior to his political career, he was the president and CEO of the Caisse de dépôt et placement du Québec and held key positions in the financial sector.

== Early life and education ==
Born in Montreal on July 6, 1931, Jean Campeau was the son of Elmira Campeau, a salesman, and Lucienne Leduc, a professor. He attended Collège Saint-Ignace and later earned a Bachelor of Arts degree from Collège Sainte-Marie de Montréal in 1952. In 1955, he obtained a licence in commercial sciences and pursued administrative studies at the École des hautes études commerciales de Paris. He also attended courses at the Association of Securities Brokers.

== Career ==
=== Finance and business ===
From 1955 to 1963, Jean Campeau worked as a securities broker for René T. Leclerc. He then served as president and CEO of Canada Flooring from 1963 to 1970. He joined the Ministry of Finance (Quebec) in 1971, where he was director of public debt management until 1977, and then served as assistant deputy minister of finance from 1977 to 1979.

In 1980, he was appointed chairman of the board and CEO of the Caisse de dépôt et placement du Québec, a position he held until 1990. During his tenure, he played a key role in managing Quebec’s public funds and investments.

He later served as chairman of the board of Domtar (1990–1993) and Banque Nationale de Paris (Canada) (1991–1994). Additionally, he was a board member of several major companies, including Ouimet-Cordon Bleu, Fonds de solidarité des travailleurs du Québec, Groupe Transcontinental GTC, Provigo, and HEC Montréal.

== Politics ==
In 1990, Jean Campeau co-chaired the Commission on the Political and Constitutional Future of Quebec (the Bélanger-Campeau Commission), which explored Quebec’s political status within Canada.

He entered politics in 1994, being elected as a Member of the National Assembly of Quebec for the Parti Québécois in the riding of Crémazie. That same year, he was appointed Minister of Finance and Minister of Revenue in the government of Premier Jacques Parizeau, serving until November 3, 1995. Following a cabinet reshuffle, he was named Minister of Transport (Quebec), a role he held until January 25, 1996, when he resigned from his ministerial position. He did not seek re-election in 1998.

== Later years ==
From 2001 to 2007, Jean Campeau represented the Quebec government on the Board of Directors of the Port of Montreal.

== Death ==
Campeau died in February 2025 at the age of 93.

== Honours and legacy ==
In 1985, he was named honorary president of the 75th-anniversary celebrations of HEC Montreal. In 1990, he was awarded the title of Grand Officer of the National Order of Quebec one of the province’s highest honours.

In 1991 he was granted the Ordre du mérite by the Association des diplômés de l'Université de Montréal to honour a Université de Montréal graduate whose career has been particularly remarkable.
