= Jean-Pierre Bélisle =

Canadian lawyer, professor, executive and politician

Jean-Pierre Bélisle, (born January 14, 1948) is a Canadian lawyer, professor, executive and politician. From 1985 to 1994, Bélisle served as a Member of the National Assembly for Mille-Îles.

== Biography ==
=== Early life ===
Jean-Pierre Bélisle was born January 14, 1948, in Montreal to Jean Bélisle and Madeleine O'Reilley. In 1965, the Bélisle family moved to Saint-Claude, a parish in the former city of Laval-des-Rapides. (Note: All the municipalities on Île Jésus merged in 1965 to form modern-day Laval.) In 1968, Bélisle received his Bachelor of Arts in economics from Collège Sainte-Marie de Montréal, followed in 1971, with a degree in civil law from McGill University and his master's degree in economics, public finance and economic development from McGill in 1972. While at McGill, Bélisle served as the director of the McGill Law Journal and President of the Faculty of Law at the university. He was admitted to the Bar of Quebec in 1973.

From June 1972 to April 1973, Bélisle worked as an executive assistant to the Deputy Minister of Finance of Quebec. By the end of May 1973, Bélisle began practicing law in Laval. From 1974 to 1976, Bélisle was a member of the Laval Chamber of Commerce. (Note: Originally called the Businessman's Association of Laval, in 1980, the two associations merged to create the Laval Chamber of Commerce and Industry.),.

=== Political career ===
Bélisle ran in the riding of Mille-Îles as a candidate for the Quebec Liberal Party in the 1981 Quebec general election, but lost to Jean-Paul Champagne of the Parti Québécois. In the 1985 elections, he defeated Champagne and became MNA for Mille-Îles., He was reelected in the 1989 Quebec general election. He served as parliamentary assistant to Finance Minister Gérard D. Levesque from November 29, 1989, to October 16, 1990. Following that position, Bélisle served as assistant parliamentary leader. In 1992, Bélisle published his book Savoir pour choisir (Know your choice), which gave his opinions on Quebec sovereignty. Bélisle resigned from his position as MNA on March 10, 1994, citing disagreements with Liberal Leader Premier Robert Bourassa. In August 1994, Bélisle donated numerous documents to the Bibliothèque et Archives nationales du Québec to create the Fonds Jean-Pierre Bélisle.

During the 2008 Canadian federal election, Bélisle ran as a candidate for the Conservative Party in Laval, losing to Nicole Demers of the Bloc Québécois. In 2010, he served as a political advisor and lawyer for the Action démocratique du Québec. He was encouraged by many Conservative members including MP Lawrence Cannon, to run as their candidate in Laval for the 2011 federal election, but declined the offer. When François Legault and Charles Sirois founded the Coalition Avenir Québec in 2011, Bélisle became a lawyer for the party.

=== Post-political life ===
Since 1996, Bélisle has owned the vineyard and restaurant La Roche des brises, in Saint-Joseph-du-Lac. Bélisle has served as a member of the board of directors for the Quebec Winegrowers Association since 2004. Bélisle is married to Gina Pratt, with whom he has three children.

== Publications ==
- Jean-Pierre Bélisle (1992). Savoir pour choisir (in French). Montréal: SERDEV. ISBN 9782980286308..

== See also ==
- 33rd legislature du Québec
- 34th legislature du Québec

== Notes and references ==
=== Bibliography ===
- Deschênes, Gaston (1993). Dictionnaire des parlementaires du Québec (in French). Quebec City: Presses de l'Université Laval. p. 859. ISBN 2-7637-7304-4.
- Normandin, P. G. (1992). The Canadian Parliamentary Guide. Gale Canada.
- "Les résultats électoraux depuis 1867, Matapédia à Montcalm" (in French). National Assembly of Quebec. 19 June 2009.
- Cournoyer, Jean (6 January 2022). "Bélisle (Jean-Pierre)". La Mémoire du Québec (in French).
