= Parti innovateur du Québec =

Innovator Party of Quebec Parti innovateur du Québec
- Leader: Raymond Robataille
- Founded: January 4, 1994
- Dissolved: March 29, 2003
- Ideology: Quebec nationalism
- Political position: Left-wing

The Parti innovateur du Québec (French pronunciation: [paʁti inɔvatœʁ dy kebɛk]) was a political party in the Canadian province of Quebec. The party, led by Raymond Robataille, ran in the 1994 and 1998, but was deregistered by Quebec's Chief Electoral Officer in 2003 after failing to present sufficient candidates in the 2003 general election.

== Ideology ==
The ideology of the party was on the left of the political spectrum, due largely to the party's call for a universal public pension system.

According to a Q&A interview with Radio-Canada in the leadup to the 2003 election, Robataille shared his position on a variety of different issues, including:

- Support for a First-past-the-post electoral system rather than a proportional representation system.
- A monthly $500 credit per child aged 0–18, in order to reverse "the death of the Franco-Québécois nation" due to demographic decline.
- Funding health care through the sales tax
- Independence for Quebec
- Creating a pension plan that allows workers to take an early retirement.
