= History of the provincial electoral map of Quebec =

The province of Quebec, in Canada, elects members of Parliament at the federal level and members of the National Assembly at the provincial level. Electoral districts (known as "electoral divisions" or circonscriptions) at the provincial level have evolved over the years.

== 1867 ==
The Legislative Assembly of Quebec was created, with 65 seats. The electoral districts for Quebec in 1867 were the same for the Legislative Assembly of Quebec and the federal House of Commons; they were the districts already in place for the pre-Confederation Legislative Assembly of the Province of Canada. (s. 40.2 and 80 of the Constitution Act 1867) It would be renamed the National Assembly on December 31, 1968.

- Argenteuil (#)
- Bagot
- Beauce
- Beauharnois
- Bellechasse
- Berthier
- Bonaventure
- Brome (#)
- Chambly
- Champlain
- Charlevoix
- Châteauguay
- Chicoutimi et Saguenay
- Compton (#)
- Deux-Montagnes
- Dorchester
- Drummond et Arthabaska
- Gaspé
- Hochelaga
- Huntingdon (#)
- Iberville
- Islet
- Jacques Cartier
- Joliette
- Kamouraska
- Laprairie
- L'Assomption
- Laval
- Lévis
- Lotbinière
- Maskinongé
- Mégantic (#)
- Missisquoi (#)
- Montcalm
- Montmagny
- Montmorency
- Montréal Centre
- Montréal Est
- Montreal Ouest
- Napierville
- Nicolet
- Ottawa (#)
- Pontiac (#)
- Portneuf
- Québec-Comté
- Québec-Centre
- Québec-Est
- Québec-Ouest
- Richelieu
- Richmond-Wolfe (#)
- Rimouski
- Rouville
- St. Hyacinthe
- St. Jean
- St. Maurice
- Shefford (#)
- Sherbrooke (#)
- Soulanges
- Stanstead (#)
- Témiscouata
- Terrebonne
- Trois-Rivières
- Vaudreuil
- Verchères
- Yamaska

(#) These twelve districts were entrenched because they could only be redistricted by the Legislative Assembly of Quebec with the consent of the MPs elected in those 12 districts (s. 80 + schedule 2 Constitution Act 1867)

This set of electoral districts was used in the following elections: 1867, 1871, 1875, 1878, 1881, 1886, and by-elections until 1890.

== 1890 ==
The number of seats increased from 65 to 73.

This set of electoral districts was used in the following elections: 1890, 1892, and by-elections until 1897.

== 1895 ==
The number of seats increased from 73 to 74.

This set of electoral districts was used in the following elections: 1897, 1900, 1904, 1908, and by-elections until 1912.

== 1912 ==
The number of seats increased from 74 to 81.

This set of electoral districts was used in the following elections: 1912, 1916, 1919, and by-elections until 1923.

== 1922 ==
The number of seats remained at 81.

This set of electoral districts was used in the following elections: 1923, 1927, and by-elections until 1931.

== 1930 ==
The number of seats increased from 81 to 90.

This set of electoral districts was used in the following elections: 1931, 1935, 1936, and by-elections until 1939.

== 1939 ==
The number of seats decreased from 90 to 86.

This set of electoral districts was used in the following elections: 1939, and by-elections until 1944.

== 1944 ==
The number of seats increased from 86 to 91.

This set of electoral districts was used in the following elections: 1944, and by-elections until 1948.

== 1945 ==
The number of seats increased from 91 to 92.

This set of electoral districts was used in the following elections: 1948, 1952, and by-elections until 1956.

== 1954 ==
The number of seats increased from 92 to 93.

This set of electoral districts was used in the following elections: 1956, and by-elections until 1960.

== 1960 ==
The number of seats remained at 93.

This set of electoral districts was used in the following elections: 1960, 1962, and by-elections until 1966.

== 1965 ==
The number of seats increased from 93 to 108.

This set of electoral districts was used in the following elections: 1966, 1970, and by-elections until 1973.

== 1972 ==
The number of seats increased from 108 to 110.

This set of electoral districts was used in the following elections: 1973, 1976, and by-elections until 1981.

== 1980 ==
For the first time, the reform of the electoral map was carried out by the independent Commission de la représentation électorale, created the previous year. The number of seats increased from 110 to 122.

- Bertrand was created from parts of Chambly and Verchères.
- Chapleau was created from parts of Papineau.
- Chomedey was created from parts of Fabre and Laval.
- Groulx was created from parts of Terrebonne.
- Joliette was re-created from part of Joliette-Montcalm.
- La Peltrie was created from part of Chauveau
- Laval-des-Rapides was created from parts of Laval, Mille-Îles, and Fabre
- Marie-Victorin was created from parts of Taillon and Laporte
- Marquette was created from parts of Notre-Dame-de-Grâce, Marguerite-Bourgeoys and Jacques-Cartier
- Nelligan was created from parts of Pointe-Claire et de Robert-Baldwin)
- Nicolet was created from part of Nicolet-Yamaska
- Pontiac was re-created from part of Pontiac-Témiscamingue
- Rousseau was created from part of L'Assomption, Joliette-Montcalm, and Prévost
- Rouyn-Noranda–Témiscamingue was created from part of Rouyn-Noranda, Gatineau, and Pontiac-Témiscamingue
- Ungava was created from parts of Abitibi-Est, Abitibi-Ouest, and from places in the Nouveau-Québec territory
- Vachon was created from part of Taillon
- Viger was created from parts of Viau and Jeanne-Mance
- Vimont was created from parts of Fabre and Mille-Îles
- Joliette-Montcalm ceased to exist; its successors were Joliette and Rousseau
- Laurentides-Labelle ceased to exist; its successor was Labelle
- Laval ceased to exist; its successors were Laval-des-Rapides and Chomedey
- Pointe-Claire ceased to exist; its successor was Nelligan
- Pontiac-Témiscamingue ceased to exist; its successors were Pontiac and Rouyn-Noranda–Témiscamingue
- Rouyn-Noranda ceased to exist; its successor was Rouyn-Noranda–Témiscamingue

This set of electoral districts was used in the following elections: 1981, and by-elections until 1985.

== 1985 ==
The number of seats remained at 122.

This set of electoral districts was used in the following elections: 1985, and by-elections until 1989.

== 1988 ==
The number of seats increased from 122 to 125.

This set of electoral districts was used in the following elections: 1989, and by-elections until 1994.

== 1992 ==
The number of seats remained at 125.

- A new Bertrand electoral district was created in the Laurentides region from parts of Labelle, Prévost and Rousseau.
- Blainville was created from parts of Groulx and Terrebonne.
- Borduas was created from parts of Verchères and Iberville.
- Laurier-Dorion was created from parts of Dorion and Laurier.
- Marguerite-D'Youville was created from part of the old Bertrand electoral district (in the Montérégie region).
- Saint-Henri–Sainte-Anne was created from all of Saint-Henri and part of Sainte-Anne.
- Westmount–Saint-Louis was created from parts of Sainte-Anne, Saint-Louis, and Westmount.
- The old Bertrand electoral district (in the Montérégie region) ceased to exist, and its successor was Marguerite-D'Youville.
- Dorion ceased to exist, and its successor was Laurier-Dorion.
- Laurier ceased to exist, and its successor was Laurier-Dorion.
- Saint-Henri ceased to exist, and its successor was Saint-Henri–Sainte-Anne.
- Saint-Louis ceased to exist, and its successor was Westmount–Saint-Louis.
- Sainte-Anne ceased to exist, and its successors were Saint-Henri–Sainte-Anne and Westmount–Saint-Louis.
- Westmount ceased to exist, and its successor was Westmount–Saint-Louis.

This set of electoral districts was used in the following elections: 1994, 1998, and by-elections until 2003.

== 2001 ==
The number of seats remained at 125.

- Beauharnois was created from parts of the former Beauharnois-Huntingdon and Salaberry-Soulanges electoral districts.
- Bourassa-Sauvé was created from part of Bourassa and all of Sauvé.
- Huntingdon was created from part of the former Beauharnois-Huntingdon.
- Jean-Lesage was created from most of the former Limoilou and a part of Montmorency electoral districts.
- Jeanne-Mance–Viger was created from almost all of Jeanne-Mance and part of Viger.
- Mirabel was created from parts of Deux-Montagnes and Argenteuil.
- Beauharnois-Huntingdon ceased to exist; its territory was divided between the new Beauharnois and Huntingdon electoral districts.
- Bourassa ceased to exist; its territory was divided between Crémazie and the new Bourassa-Sauvé electoral district.
- Jeanne-Mance ceased to exist; almost all of its territory went into the new Jeanne-Mance–Viger electoral district.
- Limoilou ceased to exist; most of its territory went to the new Jean-Lesage electoral district.
- Salaberry-Soulanges ceased to exist; its territory was divided between Soulanges and Beauharnois.
- Sauvé ceased to exist; all of its territory went into the new Bourassa-Sauvé electoral district.
- Saguenay was renamed René-Lévesque; its territory was unchanged.

This set of electoral districts was used in the following elections: 2003, 2007, 2008, and by-elections until 2012.

See also: Quebec electoral map, 2001

== 2011 ==
The number of seats remained at 125.

- Charlevoix–Côte-de-Beaupré was created from all of (former) Charlevoix, and parts of Montmorency, and of Chauveau.
- Côte-du-Sud was created from part of the former Kamouraska-Témiscouata and all of the former Montmagny-L'Islet.
- Drummond–Bois-Francs was created from parts of Arthabaska, of (former) Drummond, of (former) Nicolet-Yamaska, and of Richmond.
- Granby was created from part of the former Shefford.
- Lotbinière-Frontenac was created from parts of (former) Lotbinière, of (former) Frontenac, and of Richmond.
- Matane-Matapédia was created from part of the former Matane and all of the former Matapédia.
- Mégantic was created from parts of (former) Frontenac, of Johnson, of (former) Mégantic-Compton, and of Richmond.
- Montarville was created from parts of (former) Marguerite-D'Youville and of Chambly.
- Nicolet-Bécancour was created from parts of (former) Nicolet-Yamaska and of (former) Lotbinière.
- Repentigny was created from part of L'Assomption.
- Rivière-du-Loup–Témiscouata was created from all of (former) Rivière-du-Loup, and parts of (former) Kamouraska-Témiscouata, and of Rimouski.
- Sainte-Rose was created from parts of Fabre and Vimont.
- Saint-Jérôme was created from part of the former Prévost.
- Sanguinet was created from parts of Châteauguay, La Prairie, and Huntingdon.
- Vanier-Les Rivières was created from most of (former) Vanier, and bits of Jean-Talon, and of Taschereau.
- Charlevoix ceased to exist; all of its territory went into the new Charlevoix–Côte-de-Beaupré.
- Drummond ceased to exist; its territory was divided between the new Drummond–Bois-Francs and the existing Johnson.
- Frontenac ceased to exist; its territory was divided between the new Lotbinière-Frontenac and the new Mégantic.
- Kamouraska-Témiscouata ceased to exist; its territory was divided between the new Côte-du-Sud and the new Rivière-du-Loup–Témiscouata.
- Lotbinière ceased to exist; its territory was divided between the new Lotbinière-Frontenac, the new Nicolet-Bécancour, and the existing Arthabaska.
- Marguerite-D'Youville ceased to exist; its territory was divided between the new Montarville and the existing Verchères.
- Matane ceased to exist; its territory was divided between the new Matane-Matapédia and the existing Gaspé.
- Matapédia ceased to exist; all of its territory went into the new Matane-Matapédia.
- Mégantic-Compton ceased to exist; its territory was divided between the new Mégantic and the existing Saint-François.
- Montmagny-L'Islet ceased to exist; all of its territory went into the new Côte-du-Sud.
- Nicolet-Yamaska ceased to exist; its territory was divided between the new Nicolet-Bécancour, the new Drummond–Bois-Francs, and the existing Richelieu.
- Prévost ceased to exist; its territory was divided between the new Saint-Jérôme and the existing Bertrand.
- Rivière-du-Loup ceased to exist; all of its territory went into the new Rivière-du-Loup–Témiscouata.
- Shefford ceased to exist; its territory was divided between the new Granby and the existing Brome-Missisquoi.
- Vanier ceased to exist; its territory mostly went into the new Vanier-Les Rivières, with pieces going to the existing Chauveau, and the existing La Peltrie.
- Anjou was renamed Anjou–Louis-Riel; its territory was unchanged.

This set of electoral districts will be used in the following elections: 2012.

See also: Quebec electoral map, 2011
