= Antonio Barrette =

Premier of Quebec in 1960

Antonio J. Barrette
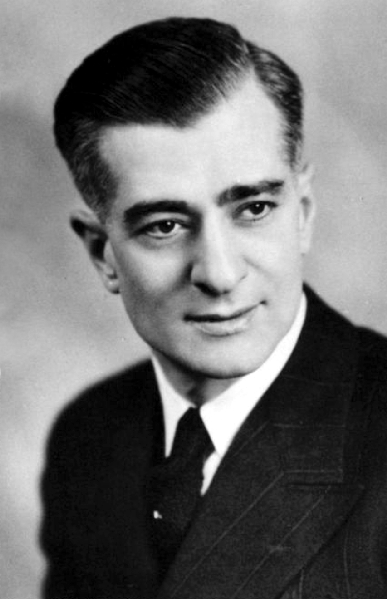

18th Premier of Quebec
- In office January 8, 1960 – July 5, 1960
- Monarch: Elizabeth II
- Lieutenant Governor: Onésime Gagnon
- Preceded by: Paul Sauvé
- Succeeded by: Jean Lesage

MNA for Joliette
- In office August 17, 1936 – September 15, 1960
- Preceded by: Lucien Dugas
- Succeeded by: Gaston Lambert

Personal details
- Born: May 26, 1899 Joliette, Quebec, Canada
- Died: December 15, 1968 (aged 69) Montreal, Quebec, Canada
- Party: Union Nationale
- Spouse: Marie-Estelle Guilbault (m. 1924)
- Profession: Machinist, Insurance broker

Antonio J. Barrette (May 26, 1899 – December 15, 1968) was a Canadian politician born in Joliette, Quebec, Canada, who served as the 18th premier of Quebec.

== Member of the legislature ==
Barrette ran as a Conservative candidate in the provincial district of Joliette in the 1935 election but lost. He was elected as a Union Nationale candidate in the 1936 election and was re-elected in the 1939, 1944, 1948, 1952 against Liberal Leader Georges-Émile Lapalme, 1956 and 1960 elections.

== Cabinet Member ==
Barrette served as Minister of Labour in the Cabinets of Maurice Duplessis and Paul Sauvé from August 30, 1944, to January 8, 1960.

== Premier of Quebec ==
After Sauvé's death, Barrette succeeded him as leader of the Union Nationale and as Premier of Quebec on January 8, 1960. He was the 18th premier of Quebec, but he held office for only six months. At the June 1960 election, he lost to Jean Lesage's Quebec Liberal Party.

== Retirement ==
He resigned as both Leader of the Union Nationale and member of the National Assembly on September 15, 1960, and later served as Canadian ambassador to Greece from April 4, 1963, to July 12, 1966. He died in 1968 in Montreal.

== See also ==
- Politics of Quebec
- List of Quebec general elections

Party political offices
Preceded by Paul Sauvé	Leader of the Union Nationale; 1960	Succeeded by Yves Prévost
Diplomatic posts
Preceded by Edgar D'Arcy McGreer	Canadian Ambassador to Greece; 1963–1966	Succeeded by Arthur Edward Blanchette
