= Paul Sauvé =

Premier of Quebec from 1959 to 1960

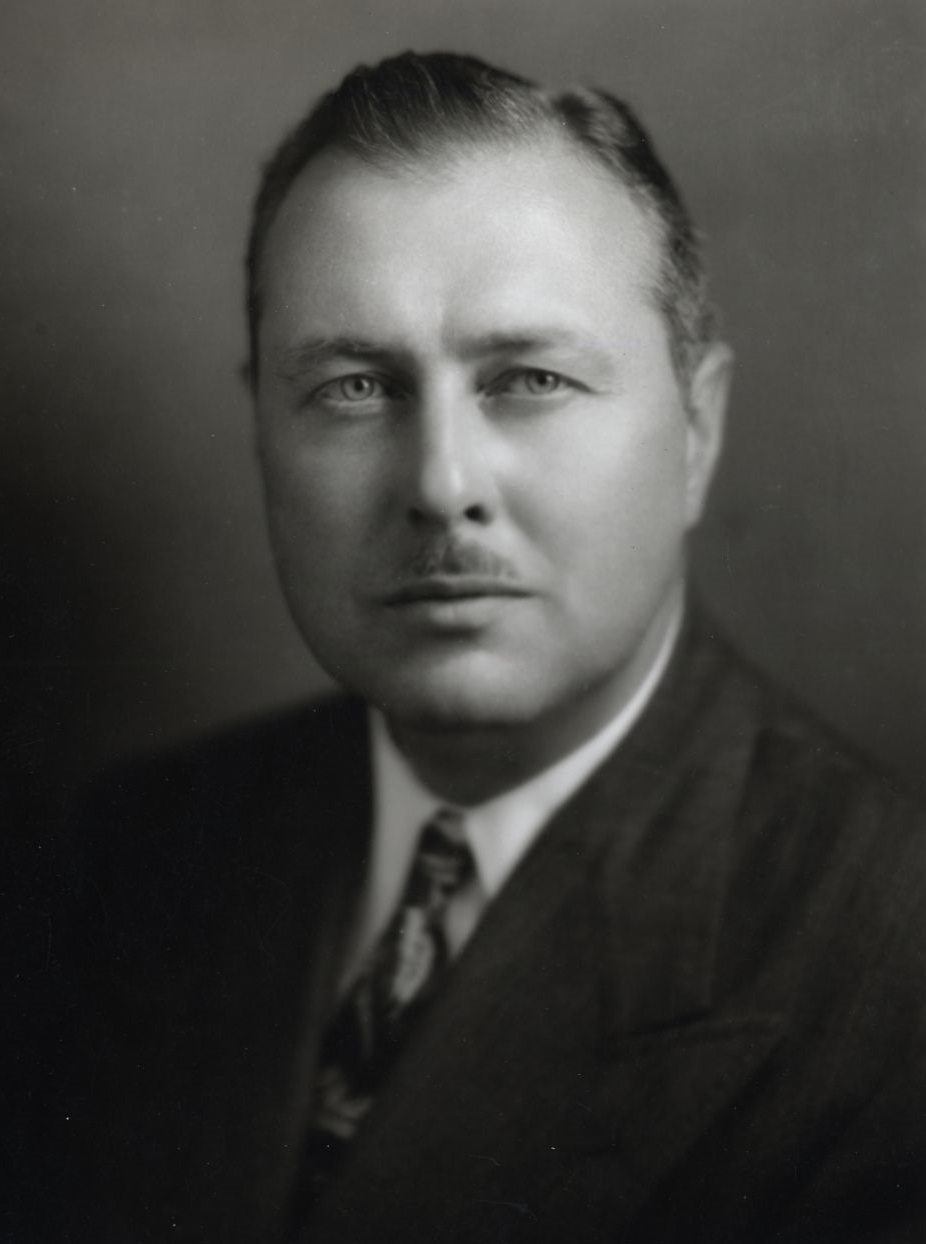
- Paul Sauvé, 1950

17th Premier of Quebec
- In office September 7, 1959 – January 2, 1960
- Monarch: Elizabeth II
- Lieutenant Governor: Onésime Gagnon
- Preceded by: Maurice Duplessis
- Succeeded by: Antonio Barrette

MNA for Deux-Montagnes
- In office August 17, 1936 – January 2, 1960
- Preceded by: Jean-Léo Rochon
- Succeeded by: Gaston Binette
- In office November 4, 1930 – November 25, 1935
- Preceded by: Arthur Sauvé
- Succeeded by: Jean-Léo Rochon

Personal details
- Born: Joseph-Mignault-Paul Sauvé; March 24, 1907 Saint-Benoît, Quebec, Canada
- Died: January 2, 1960 (aged 52) Saint-Eustache, Quebec, Canada
- Party: Conservative (1930–1936); Union Nationale (1936–1960)
- Spouse: Luce Pelland (m. 1936)
- Children: 3
- Parent: Arthur Sauvé (father)
- Profession: Lawyer

Military service
- Branch/service: Canadian Army
- Battles/wars: World War II
- Awards: Croix de guerre

Joseph-Mignault-Paul Sauvé (French pronunciation: [ʒozɛf miɲo pɔl sove]; March 24, 1907 – January 2, 1960) was a Canadian lawyer, World War II veteran, and politician. He was the 17th premier of Quebec in 1959 and 1960.

== Life ==
Paul Sauvé was born in Saint-Benoit, Quebec, Canada to journalist and parliamentarian Arthur Sauvé and Marie-Louise Lachaîne. By 1923, his family moved to Saint-Eustache and he began his studies at the Séminaire de Ste-Thérèse and transferred to the Collège Sainte-Marie de Montréal where he graduated in 1927. Sauvé would go on to study law at the Université de Montréal, being called to the bar on July 8, 1930. In 1936, he married Luce Pelland, with whom he had three children: Luce-Paule (1937), Pierre (1938) and Ginette (1944).

== Political career ==
Arthur Sauvé, his father, had been leader of the Conservative Party during the Premiership of Liberal Louis-Alexandre Taschereau. He transferred to federal politics in 1930 and became Postmaster General in the R. B. Bennett government. Paul Sauvé then ran as a Conservative for his father's former riding of the comté des Deux-Montagnes in the Quebec legislature in 1930, to become to the youngest elected member at the age of 23. He would be defeated in the 1935 election but re-elected in 1936 as a member of the newly formed Union Nationale, formed from a merger of his Conservatives with the bulk of the Action libérale nationale. He was then elected as Speaker to become, at the age of 29, the youngest person elected to that position.

When Canada entered the Second World War in 1939, Paul Sauvé reported to Les Fusiliers Mont-Royal, the regiment to which he belonged as a reserve officer, and served overseas in the Canadian military for the duration of the Second World War, taking part in the Battle of Normandy and in the South Beveland Campaign. In 1945, he returned from Europe and resumed his official duties with the Quebec legislature. In 1946, he became Quebec's first Minister of Social Welfare and Youth.

Sauvé is viewed as having upheld his convictions and had not succumbed to fear of demotion by "The Chief" (Duplessis). Some say that he stood alone in a cabinet of "yes men".

Sauvé succeeded Maurice Duplessis as leader of the Union Nationale and Premier of Quebec following Duplessis's death on September 7, 1959; he continued to serve as his own Social Welfare and Youth Minister.

By the time he became Premier, Sauvé was well aware that he had, at most, two years before the next election. Realizing the need to modernize one of the most conservative provincial governments in Canada, he announced radical changes in the ways Quebec would be run. His resolve was conveyed in the motto he adopted: "Désormais" (from now on). During those "100 Days Of Change," Sauvé undertook a wide-ranging review of issues facing the Quebec government, including many that had been ignored during the Duplessis era. For this reason, he was regarded by many as the actual 'founder' of the Quiet Revolution.

As educational reform was seen as a means to social change and national development, Sauvé begun negotiations to recover the money Ottawa set aside for higher education, while government grants would increase towards educational institutions, no longer distributed at the government's discretion.

Regarding Canadian federalism, the Sauvé provincial government considered that federal grants to universities encroached an area reserved exclusively for the provinces under the British North America Act, 1867 (since renamed the Constitution Act, 1867). Demands were also made in respect that the provincial university education tax be deductible.

The Sauvé government also wanted to undertake an in depth study of the federal legislation regarding the federal hospital insurance system and the means for adapting it for Québec.

However, Sauvé's tenure was short-lived, as he himself shortly died in office on January 2, 1960, in Saint-Eustache of a heart attack. His 117-day tenure as premier is the shortest non-interim stint in the province's history. His death left the Union Nationale government in disarray. Less than a year later, the Union Nationale was defeated under his successor, Antonio Barrette.

== Legacy ==
Paul Sauvé Arena in Montreal was named after him, and was used by the Parti Québécois for their election night rally in 1976 where they celebrated victory in the provincial election.

Elementary school École Sauve in the city of Deux-Montagnes was named after him.

National Assembly of Quebec
Preceded by Lucien Dugas (Liberal)	Speaker of the Legislative Assembly of Quebec; 7 October 1936 – 19 February 1940	Succeeded by Bernard Bissonnette (Liberal)
Party political offices
Preceded by Maurice Duplessis	Leader of the Union Nationale; 1959–1960	Succeeded by Yves Prévost
