= Véronique Hivon =

Canadian politician

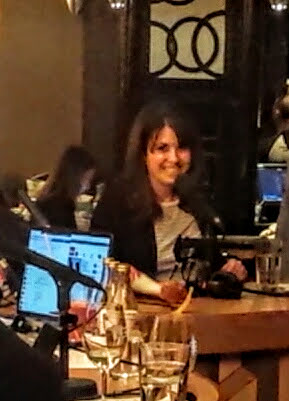
- Hivon in 2018

Member of the National Assembly of Quebec for Joliette
- In office December 8, 2008 – August 28, 2022
- Preceded by: Pascal Beaupré
- Succeeded by: François St-Louis

Personal details
- Born: 1970 (age 55–56) Joliette, Quebec, Canada
- Party: Parti Québécois
- Children: 1
- Education: London School of Economics; University of Ottawa; McGill University

Véronique Hivon (born 1970) is a Canadian politician in the province of Quebec. Hivon was elected to represent the riding of Joliette in the National Assembly of Quebec in the 2014 provincial election. She is a member of the Parti Québécois.

== Education and early career ==
Hivon graduated from McGill University with a degree in common law and a degree in civil law (1994) after brief studies at the University of Ottawa in political science. She also has a master's degree in planning and analysis of social politics from the London School of Economics and Political Science.

She worked as a researcher and law intern in 1994 but started to work as a lawyer starting in 2002 though she was admitted to the Quebec Bar in 1996. She also worked as a press secretary and Assistant Director to the Cabinet of the Minister of Justice and was also an assistant director of McGill's Law Faculty.

== Political career ==
Hivon was first candidate for the PQ in 2007 but lost to then-health minister Philippe Couillard in the riding of Jean-Talon. Hivon defeated the ADQ's Pascal Beaupré in Joliette in 2008.

Hivon was re-elected in Joliette in 2012. The premier at the time, Pauline Marois, named her Minister of Social Services and Youth Protection. Hivon served concurrently as the Minister of the Lanaudière region and Minister responsible for the "Die in Dignity" commission, a commission about the right for a terminally-ill patient to end their own life. The Quebec legislature adopted the law (The Act Respecting End-of-Life Care) unanimously demonstrating a strong consensus on the project in Quebec.

In the 2014 Quebec general election, Hivon was again re-elected to the National Assembly but as a member in the opposition rather than in the government.

On December 1, 2015, the Quebec Superior Court suspended the Act Respecting End-of-Life Care, declaring it unconstitutional. The ruling was appealed by the Liberal government.

Following the resignation of Pierre Karl Péladeau as leader of the Parti Québécois, Hivon said that she was interested in running for leadership of the party.

Hivon announced in April 2022 that she would not run for another term in the 2022 Quebec general election.

== Electoral history ==
2018 Quebec general election: Joliette
| Party | Candidate | Votes | % | ±% |
|---|---|---|---|---|
| Parti Québécois | Véronique Hivon | 17,685 | 46.23 | +1.9 |
| Coalition Avenir Québec | François St-Louis | 13,254 | 34.65 | +7.58 |
| Québec solidaire | Judith Sicard | 3,881 | 10.15 | +2.88 |
| Liberal | Emilie Imbeault | 2,620 | 6.85 | -12.63 |
| Green | Étienne St-Jean | 528 | 1.38 | |
| Citoyens au pouvoir | Sébastien Dupuis | 283 | 0.74 | |
| Total valid votes | | 38,251 | 98.38 | |
| Total rejected ballots | | 630 | 1.62 | |
| Turnout | | 38,881 | 71.93 | |
| Eligible voters | | 54,057 | | |
| Parti Québécois hold | | Swing | | -2.84 |
Source(s) "Rapport des résultats officiels du scrutin". Élections Québec.

2014 Quebec general election: Joliette
| Party | Candidate | Votes | % | ±% |
|---|---|---|---|---|
| Parti Québécois | Véronique Hivon | 17,477 | 44.33 | -2.79 |
| Coalition Avenir Québec | Denise Larouche | 10,671 | 27.07 | -2.82 |
| Liberal | Robert Corriveau | 7,681 | 19.48 | +5.46 |
| Québec solidaire | Flavie Trudel | 2,866 | 7.27 | +1.64 |
| Option nationale | Sylvain Legault | 510 | 1.29 | -0.20 |
| Conservative | Mikey Colangelo Lauzon | 220 | 0.56 | +0.09 |
| Total valid votes | | 39,425 | 98.00 | |
| Total rejected ballots | | 804 | 2.00 | +0.62 |
| Turnout | | 40,229 | 69.85 | -8.48 |
| Electors on the lists | | 57,591 | – | |
| Parti Québécois hold | | Swing | | +0.02 |

- 2014 source:

2012 Quebec general election: Joliette
| Party | Candidate | Votes | % | ±% |
|---|---|---|---|---|
| Parti Québécois | Véronique Hivon | 20,509 | 47.12 | +1.03 |
| Coalition Avenir Québec | Normand Masse | 13,009 | 29.89 | |
| Liberal | Pascal Beaupré | 6,102 | 14.02 | -14.81 |
| Québec solidaire | Flavie Trudel | 2,449 | 5.63 | +0.76 |
| Option nationale | Amélie Dolbec | 649 | 1.49 | |
| Independent | Jean-Mathieu Desmarais | 513 | 1.18 | |
| Conservative | Mikey Colangelo Lauzon | 202 | 0.46 | |
| Quebec Citizens' Union | Michel Thouin | 92 | 0.21 | |
| Total valid votes | | 43,525 | 98.62 | |
| Total rejected ballots | | 610 | 1.38 | |
| Turnout | | 44,135 | 78.34 | |
| Electors on the lists | | 56,340 | – | |

- 2012 source:

2008 Quebec general election: Joliette
| Party | Candidate | Votes | % | ±% |
|---|---|---|---|---|
| Parti Québécois | Véronique Hivon | 14,666 | 46.09 | +11.02 |
| Liberal | Christian Trudel | 9,175 | 28.83 | +8.61 |
| Action démocratique | Pascal Beaupré | 6,185 | 19.44 | -17.64 |
| Québec solidaire | Flavie Trudel | 1,549 | 4.87 | +0.32 |
| Independent | Pablo Lugo-Herrera | 246 | 0.77 | - |

2007 Quebec general election: Jean-Talon
| Party | Candidate | Votes | % | ±% |
|---|---|---|---|---|
| Liberal | Philippe Couillard | 13,732 | 41.96 | -3.63 |
| Parti Québécois | Véronique Hivon | 9,859 | 30.13 | -5.23 |
| Action démocratique | Luc de la Sablonnière | 6,056 | 18.51 | +3.34 |
| Green | Ali Dahan | 1,518 | 4.64 | +3.23 |
| Québec solidaire | Bill Clennett | 1,463 | 4.47 | +2.95* |
| Christian Democracy | Francis Denis | 95 | 0.29 | - |
| Total valid votes | | 32,723 | 99.29 | – |
| Total rejected ballots | | 235 | 0.71 | +0.06 |
| Turnout | | 32,958 | 79.98 | -0.47 |
| Electors on the lists | | 41,208 | – | – |
| Liberal hold | | Swing | | +0.80 |

* Increase is from Union des forces progressistes (UFP)
