= Joseph-Mathias Tellier =

Canadian politician and judge

The Honourable Sir Joseph-Mathias Tellier
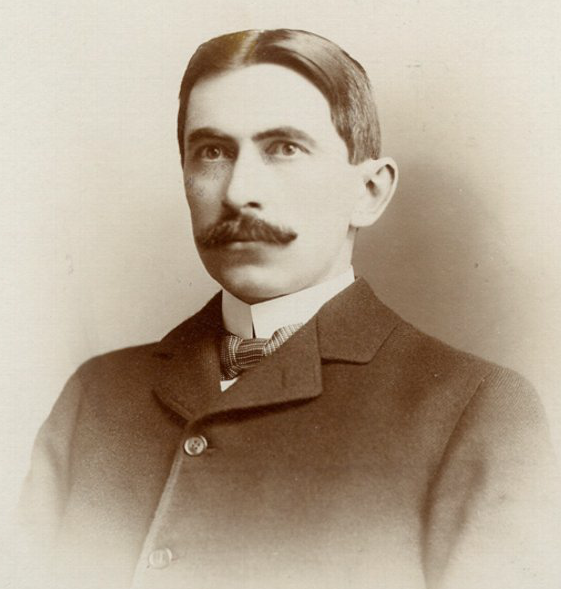

Member of the Legislative Assembly of Quebec for Joliette
- In office 1892–1916
- Preceded by: Louis Basinet
- Succeeded by: Ernest Hébert

Leader of the Official Opposition of Quebec
- In office 1909–1915
- Preceded by: Pierre-Évariste Leblanc
- Succeeded by: Philémon Cousineau

Chief Justice of Quebec
- In office 1932–1942
- Preceded by: Pierre-Eugène Lafontaine
- Succeeded by: Séverin Létourneau

Personal details
- Born: January 15, 1861 Sainte-Mélanie, Canada East
- Died: October 18, 1952 (aged 91) Joliette, Quebec, Canada
- Party: Conservative
- Relations: Louis Tellier, brother
- Children: Maurice Tellier

Sir Joseph-Mathias Tellier (French pronunciation: [ʒozɛf matjas tɛlje]; January 15, 1861 – October 18, 1952) was a Canadian politician and judge, born in Sainte-Mélanie, Canada East.

== Biography ==
He was a Quebec Conservative Party leader, but never Premier (his party lost the 1912 election, and Lomer Gouin became Premier of Quebec). He was in the Legislative Assembly of Quebec from 1892 to 1916, as a Member for the riding of Joliette.

After his studies at Université Laval, he was admitted to the Barreau du Quebec and he practiced law for over 15 years.

He was mayor of Joliette from 1903 to 1910, and, in 1916, he became a Quebec Superior Court judge. He was Chief Justice of Quebec from 1932 to 1942.

He was made a Knight of the Order of Pius IX in 1906. He was Knighted by King George V in 1934.

Sir Joseph-Mathias Tellier is the brother of Louis Tellier, the father of Maurice Tellier, the grandfather of Paul Tellier, and a first cousin of Raymond Tellier, who is the grandfather of Luc-Normand Tellier.

== Elections as party leader ==
He lost the 1912 election against Sir Lomer Gouin.

== See also ==
- List of Quebec leaders of the Opposition
