= Louis Basinet =

Canadian politician

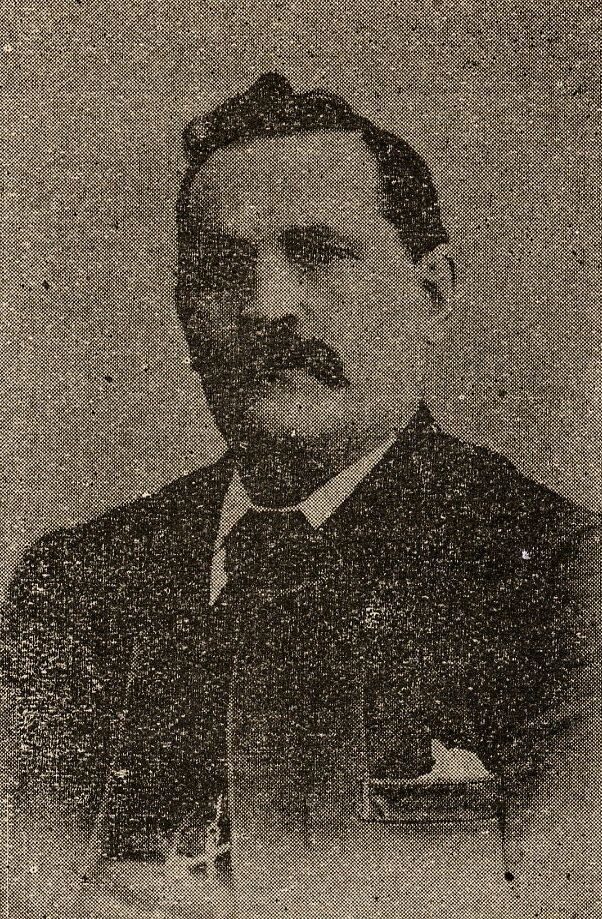
Louis Basinet, mayor of Saint-Charles-Borromée (cropped)

Louis Basinet (November 30, 1846 – May 8, 1918) was a farmer and political figure in Quebec. He represented Joliette in the Legislative Assembly of Quebec from 1886 to 1892 as a Liberal.

He was born in Joliette, Canada East, the son of Joseph Basinet and Louise Trudeau, and was educated at the Collège de Joliette. In 1868, he married Malvina Deblois. Basinet was mayor of Saint-Charles-Borromée from 1878 to 1917. He ran unsuccessfully for a seat in the Quebec assembly in 1885, losing to Joseph-Norbert-Alfred McConville. His election in 1886 was overturned in 1889 but he won the subsequent by-election held later that year. He was reelected in 1890 but lost to Joseph-Mathias Tellier when he ran for reelection in 1892. Basinet died in Joliette at the age of 71.

His brother Charles served as a member of the Canadian House of Commons.
