= Lévis Brien =

Canadian politician

Member of the National Assembly of Quebec for Rousseau
- In office September 12, 1994 – November 30, 1998
- Preceded by: Robert Thérien
- Succeeded by: François Legault

Personal details
- Born: March 21, 1955 (age 71) Joliette, Quebec
- Party: Parti Québécois
- Other political affiliations: Liberal Party (federal)
- Spouse: Nicole Perreault (m. 1978)
- Profession: Politician

Joseph Paul Benoit Lévis Brien (born March 21, 1955) is a Quebec politician. He served as the member for Rousseau in the Quebec National Assembly as a member of the Parti Québécois from 1994 until 1998.

== Biography ==
Brien earned his bachelor's degree in Consumer Applied Science from Université Laval in 1978.

He worked as an information officer at Cooprix Lanaudière, Joliette, and the Local Consumer Information Center, Saint-Félix-de-Valois, from 1978 to 1984. He was a public relations officer at Statistics Canada from 1984 to 1989.

He was appointed commissioner for the Quebec Agricultural Markets and Foods Authority on February 5, 1999, and worked as a professor of English at the Commission scolaire des Samares and the Commission scolaire des Affluents.

== Political career ==
Brien was a municipal councilor from 1987 to 1989 for Saint-Gérard-Majella. He worked in the office of Joliette MP René Laurin before he ran in Rousseau in 1994 as the Parti Québécois formed the government.

He was a backbench supporter in the Bouchard government.

Brien did not seek re-election in 1998. He ran for the Liberal Party of Canada in Repentigny in 2004 and lost.

== Electoral record ==
=== Federal ===
2004 Canadian federal election
Party	Candidate	Votes	%	±%	Expenditures
Bloc Québécois	Benoît Sauvageau	35,907	70.06	+12.26	
Liberal	Lévis Brien	9,353	18.25	-8.63	$76,485
Conservative	Allen F. Mackenzie	2,447	4.77	-5.69	$5,725
New Democratic	André Cardinal	1,526	2.98	+1.55	
Green	Jean-François Lévêque	1,482	2.89	n/a	$0
Marijuana	François Boudreau	539	1.05	-2.38	
Total valid votes/expense limit		51,254	100.00	$79,823	

=== Provincial ===
1994 Quebec general election: Rousseau
Party	Candidate	Votes	%	±%
Parti Québécois	Lévis Brien	16,532	53.86	+14.11
Liberal	Roger Beausoleil	9,833	32.03	-28.22
Action démocratique	Guy Cloutier	3,595	11.71	–
New Democratic	Gilles Garneau	631	2.06	–
Republic of Canada	Christiane Deland-Gervais	106	0.35	–
Total valid votes		30,697	98.04	
Rejected and declined votes		613	1.96	-2.11
Turnout		31,310	77.66	+6.03
Electors on the lists		40,316		
Source: Results, Government of Quebec
Parti Québécois gain from Liberal		Swing		+21.17
