= François St-Louis =

Canadian politician

Member of the National Assembly of Quebec for Joliette
- In office October 3, 2022 – August 27, 2026
- Preceded by: Véronique Hivon
- Succeeded by: Véronique Venne

Personal details
- Born: 1967 Quebec City
- Party: Coalition Avenir Québec

François St-Louis is a Canadian politician, who was elected to the National Assembly of Quebec in the 2022 Quebec general election. He represented the riding of Joliette as a member of the Coalition Avenir Québec. He did not seek re-election in the 2026 general election.

== Electoral record ==
2022 Quebec general election: Joliette
Party	Candidate	Votes	%	±%
Coalition Avenir Québec	François St-Louis	17,925	45.58	+10.93
Parti Québécois	Véronique Venne	12,281	31.23	-15.01
Québec solidaire	Flavie Trudel	4,476	11.38	+1.23
Conservative	Pascal Laurin	3,470	8.82	–
Liberal	Diana Mélissa Crispin	1,178	3.00	-3.85
Total valid votes		39,330	98.30	–
Total rejected ballots		680	1.70	+0.08
Turnout		40,010	69.76	-2.16
Electors on the lists		57,352	–	–
Coalition Avenir Québec gain from Parti Québécois		Swing		+12.97
