= Véronique Venne =

Véronique Venne MNA

Member of the National Assembly for Joliette
- Incumbent
- Assumed office October 5, 2026
- Preceded by: François St-Louis

Mayor of Sainte-Marie-Salomé
- In office November 3, 2013 – 2026
- Preceded by: Maurice Richard

Personal details
- Party: Parti Québécois

Véronique Venne is a Canadian politician who is a candidate for the National Assembly of Quebec for Joliette in the 2026 Quebec general election as a member of the Parti Québécois.

She ran in the same riding in the 2022 Quebec general election and came in 2nd place, losing to François St-Louis.

== Electoral record ==
2026 Quebec general election: Joliette
** Preliminary results — Not yet official **
Party	Candidate	Votes	%	±%
Parti Québécois	Véronique Venne	18,368	45.04	+13.81
Coalition Avenir Québec	Clodine Desrochers	7,227	17.72	–27.86
Conservative	Rémi Lafrenière	7,138	17.50	+8.68
Liberal	Sana Arfaoui	3,775	9.26	+6.26
Québec solidaire	Flavie Trudel	3,541	8.68	–2.70
Parti nul	David Chouinard	268	0.66	N/A
Green	Boris Geynet	235	0.58	N/A
Présence	Xavie Jean-Bourgeault	118	0.29	N/A
Climat Québec	Sophie Sarrazin	113	0.28	N/A
Total valid votes		40,783	98.10	–0.20
Total rejected ballots		792	1.90	+0.20
Turnout		41,575	69.99	+0.23
Electors on the lists		59,404		
Parti Québécois gain from Coalition Avenir Québec		Swing		+20.84
Source: Élections Québec

2022 Quebec general election: Joliette
Party	Candidate	Votes	%	±%
Coalition Avenir Québec	François St-Louis	17,925	45.58	+10.93
Parti Québécois	Véronique Venne	12,281	31.23	-15.01
Québec solidaire	Flavie Trudel	4,476	11.38	+1.23
Conservative	Pascal Laurin	3,470	8.82	–
Liberal	Diana Mélissa Crispin	1,178	3.00	-3.85
Total valid votes		39,330	98.30	–
Total rejected ballots		680	1.70	+0.08
Turnout		40,010	69.76	-2.16
Electors on the lists		57,352	–	–
Coalition Avenir Québec gain from Parti Québécois		Swing		+12.97
