= Saint-Calixte =

- Municipality
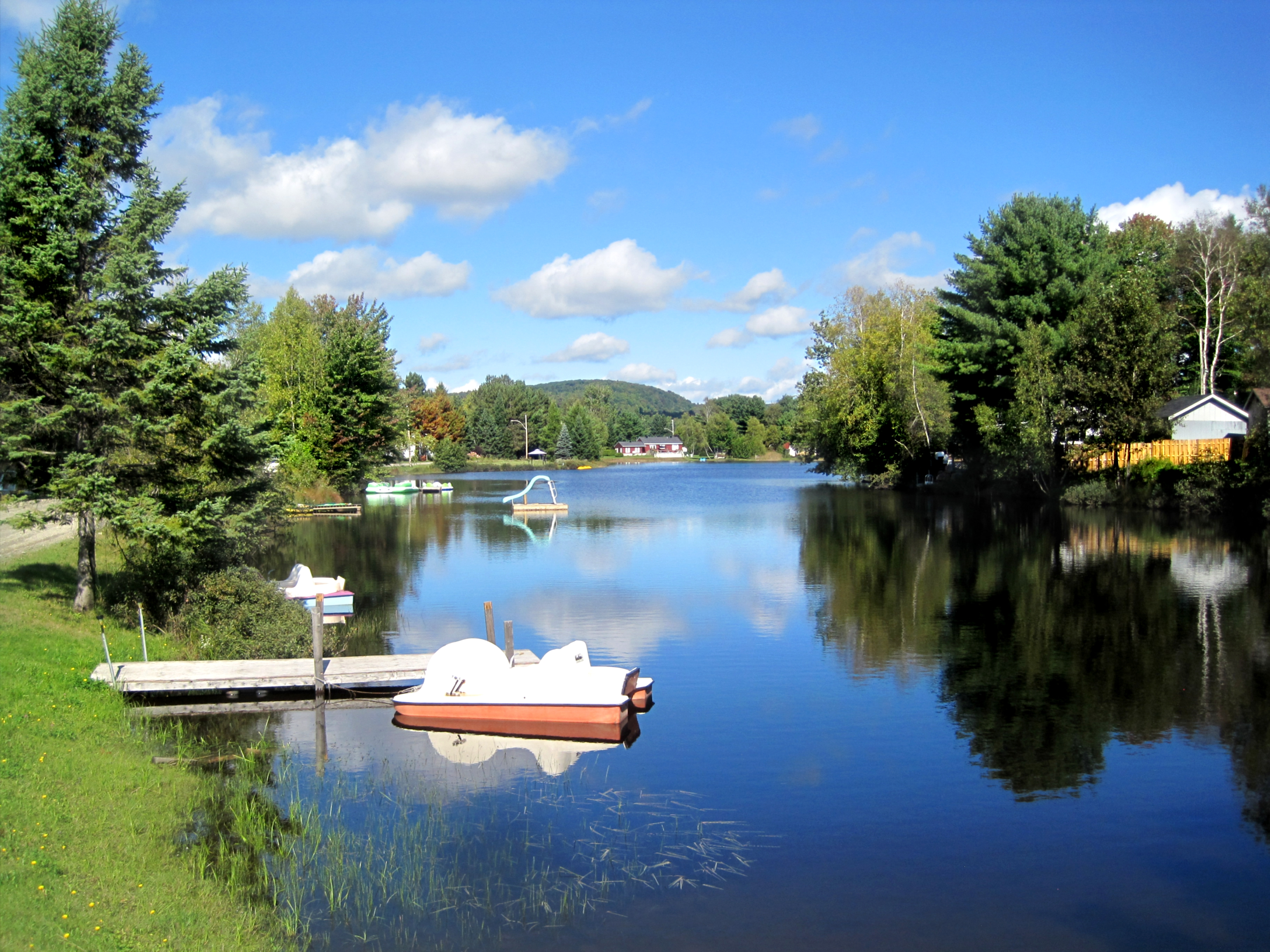
- Lac des Artistes

- Coat of arms

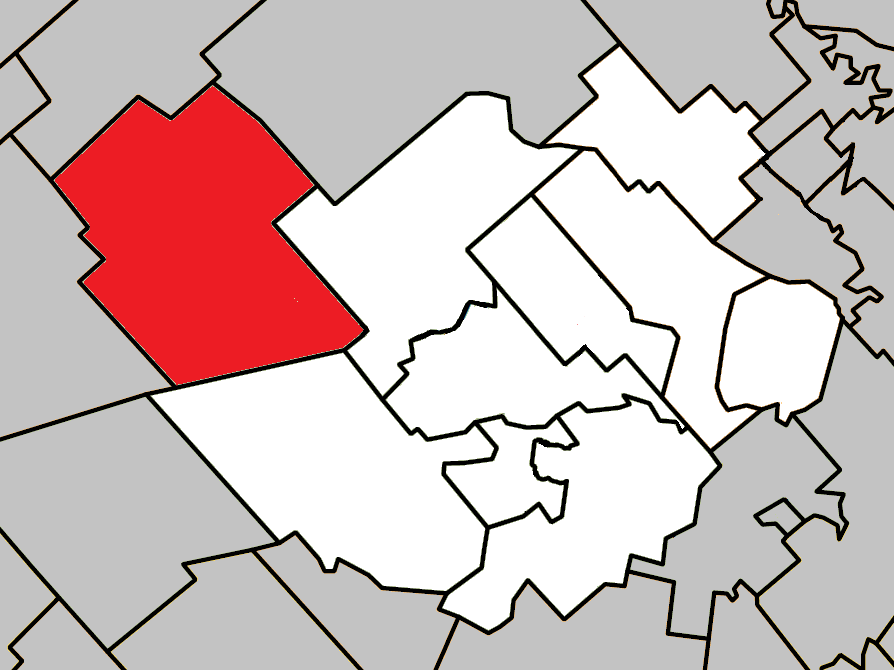
- Location within Montcalm RCM

- Location in central Quebec
- Coordinates: 45°57′N 73°51′W
- Country: Canada
- Province: Quebec
- Region: Lanaudière
- RCM: Montcalm
- Constituted: July 1, 1855

Government
  - Mayor: Michel Jasmin
  - Fed. riding: Les Pays-d'en-Haut
  - Prov. riding: Rousseau

Area
  - Total: 146.72 km^{2} (56.65 sq mi)
  - Land: 142.63 km^{2} (55.07 sq mi)

Population (2021)
  - Total: 6,792
  - Density: 47.6/km^{2} (123/sq mi)
  - 2016-2021: ▲12.3%
  - Dwellings: 3,791
- Time zone: UTC−5 (EST)
  - Summer (DST): UTC−4 (EDT)
- Postal code(s): J0K 1Z0
- Area codes: 450, 579
- Highways: R-335
- Website: www.saint-calixte.ca

Saint-Calixte (French pronunciation: [sɛ̃ kalikst]) is a municipality and town in the Lanaudière region of Quebec, Canada, part of the Montcalm Regional County Municipality. Its proximity to the city of Montreal, and its natural environment, make Saint-Calixte a destination for camping in the summertime. There are also many cottages that surround the many lakes in the region. In 2013, Quebec's largest amusement/camping site, Camping et parc d'amusement Atlantide, a 10 million dollar investment, opened its doors in the municipality.

== History ==
Before its creation the territory of Saint-Calixte was part of an area known as Saint-Lin (now Saint-Lin-Laurentides) In 1851, the Saint-Calixte Mission was formed, named after Pope Callixtus I.

In 1855, the municipality was officially founded as the Township Municipality of Kilkenny, taking the name of the geographic township in which it is located (the township was formed in 1832 and named after a city and county in Ireland). A year later in 1856, the post office opened, bearing the name Saint-Calixte-de-Kilkenny since 1877.

Designed by architect Adolphe Lévesque, the stone church with its Gothic interior was inaugurated in 1885. The first parish priest of Saint-Calixte was Louis-Joseph-Isaac Martel, from 1853 to 1855, preceded by Jean-Romuald Paré, a missionary, from 1851 to 1853. The current parish priest is Wilson Ramirez-Angel. Raymond Gravel was parish priest at Saint-Calixte from 1994 to 1997 and is known for his commitment to the police and fire services.

In 1954, Kilkenny was renamed to the current name of Saint-Calixte. The coat of arms of the municipality of Saint-Calixte was created in the 1960s by the Canadian College of Arms. The municipality's motto is Firmamentum est Dominus timentibus eum, which means ‘God is a support to those who fear him.’

The Lac Dodon meteorite was found near the town in 1993. In 1994, the Beaulac sector, which was part of the municipality of Saint-Calixte, was annexed to the municipality of Chertsey. Founded in 1997, the Montcalm Police Board was abolished in 2001 and replaced by the Sûreté du Québec.

== Demographics ==
In the 2021 Census of Population conducted by Statistics Canada, Saint-Calixte had a population of 6,792 living in 3,149 of its 3,791 total private dwellings, a change of 12.3% from its 2016 population of 6,046. The average household size is 2.2 people. With a land area of 142.63 km^{2} (55.07 sq mi), it had a population density of 47.6/km^{2} (123.3/sq mi) in 2021. As of 2021, the average age of the population is 44.5 years.

Historical census populations – Saint-Calixte

| Year | Pop. | ±% |
|---|---|---|
| 1861 | 1,520 | — |
| 1871 | 1,297 | −14.7% |
| 1881 | 1,234 | −4.9% |
| 1891 | 1,002 | −18.8% |
| 1901 | 925 | −7.7% |
| 1911 | 827 | −10.6% |
| 1921 | 859 | +3.9% |
| 1931 | 790 | −8.0% |

| Year | Pop. | ±% |
|---|---|---|
| 1941 | 835 | +5.7% |
| 1951 | 970 | +16.2% |
| 1956 | 974 | +0.4% |
| 1961 | 1,045 | +7.3% |
| 1966 | 1,087 | +4.0% |
| 1971 | 1,488 | +36.9% |
| 1976 | 1,704 | +14.5% |
| 1981 | 2,592 | +52.1% |

| Year | Pop. | ±% |
|---|---|---|
| 1986 | 3,183 | +22.8% |
| 1991 | 3,869 | +21.6% |
| 1996 | 4,681 | +21.0% |
| 2001 | 4,912 | +4.9% |
| 2006 | 5,687 | +15.8% |
| 2011 | 5,934 | +4.3% |
| 2016 | 6,046 | +1.9% |
| 2021 | 6,792 | +12.3% |

Source: Statistics Canada

Private dwellings occupied by usual residents (2021): 3149 (total dwellings: 3791)

Mother tongue (2021):

- English as first language: 2.6%
- French as first language: 93.2%
- English and French as first languages: 1.4%
- Other as first language: 2.4%

== Attractions ==
=== Camping et parc d'amusement Atlantide ===
In 2011, two investors from Terrebonne, Quebec decided to invest 10 million dollars to build a theme park, and camping site in the province of Quebec. After a number of years of planning, they chose Saint-Calixte as the location of the park, and purchased a 5 million square feet property in the municipality. After more than a year of construction, the first phase of the park opened in summer 2013, with over 300 camping spaces available, and a water park, as well as playgrounds. Two other expansion phases are planned for 2014 and 2015, which are planned to increase the capacity of the park and camping ground to 2000 spaces, with an artificial lake and beach, as well as a convenience store.

== Government ==
List of former mayors:

- Clément Charest (1994–2002)
- Jacques Ouellette (2002–2005)
- Martin St-Pierre (2005–2009)
- Louis-Charles Thouin (2009–2017)
- Michel Jasmin (2017–present)

== Education ==
Commission scolaire des Samares operates Francophone public schools:

- École Louis-Joseph-Martel — de la Gentiane
  - pavillon de la Gentiane
  - pavillon Louis-Joseph-Martel

Sir Wilfrid Laurier School Board operates Anglophone public schools:

- Rawdon Elementary School in Rawdon serves St. Calixte Village
- Joliette Elementary School in Saint-Charles-Borromée serves the township
- Joliette High School in Joliette serves all of Saint-Calixte
