= Guy Chevrette =

Canadian politician

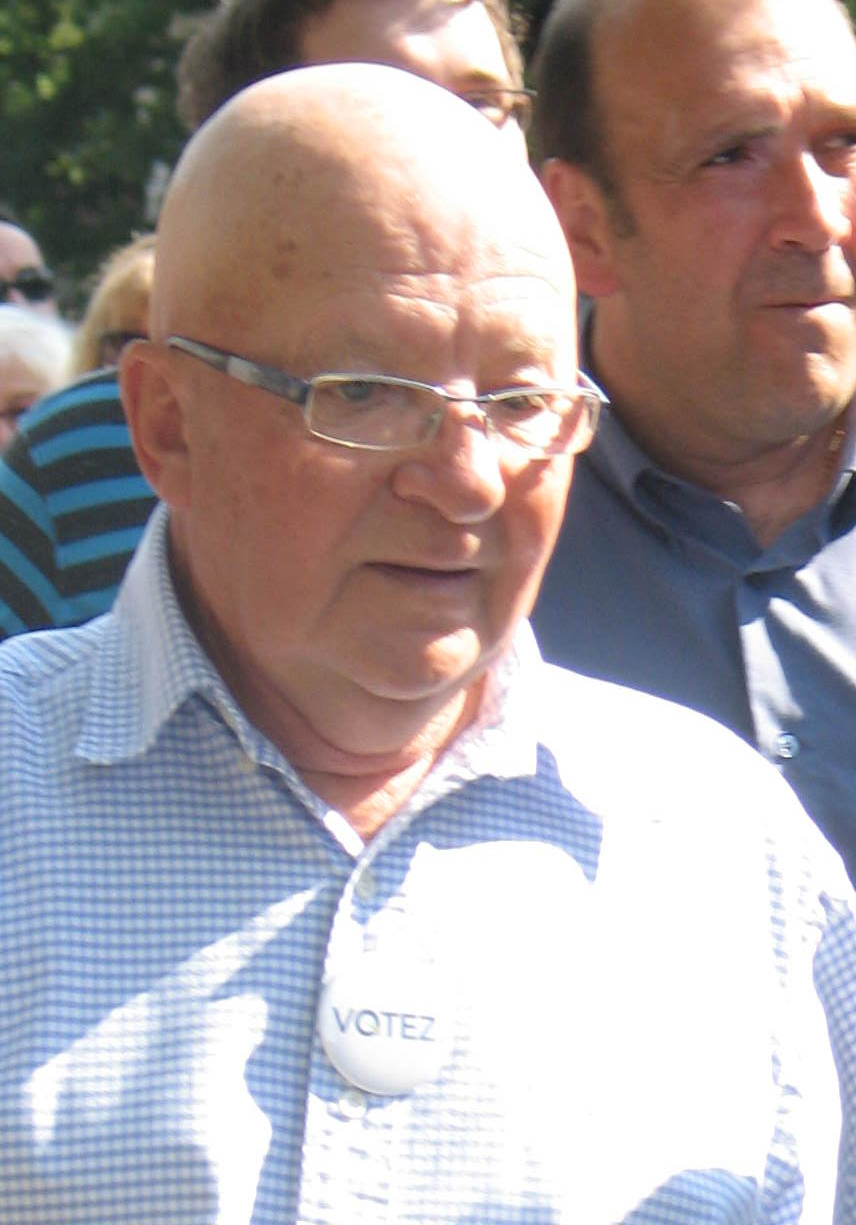

Leader of the Opposition (Quebec)
- In office November 12, 1987 – August 9, 1989
- Preceded by: Pierre-Marc Johnson
- Succeeded by: Jacques Parizeau

Interim Leader of the Parti Québécois
- In office November 12, 1987 – March 18, 1988
- Preceded by: Pierre-Marc Johnson
- Succeeded by: Jacques Parizeau

Personal details
- Born: January 10, 1940 (age 86) Saint-Come, Quebec
- Party: Parti Québécois

Guy Chevrette (born January 10, 1940, in Saint-Come, Quebec) served as Parti Québécois leader of the Opposition in the National Assembly of Quebec, Canada, from 1987 to 1989. He was the MNA for the riding of Joliette-Montcalm from 1976 to 1981 and Joliette from 1981 to 2002.

== Biography ==
When former premier Pierre-Marc Johnson quit politics in 1987 after losing the 1985 election, Chevrette became Leader of the Opposition. In 1988, the PQ elected a new leader, Jacques Parizeau, however Parizeau was not sitting in the National Assembly since he had resigned in 1984.

In the 1989 election, Parizeau won a seat and replaced Chevrette as Leader of the Opposition.

After the PQ won the 1994 election, Chevrette served in various ministerial posts in the cabinet in the governments of Parizeau, Lucien Bouchard and Bernard Landry. He resigned and quit politics in 2002.

In 2003, he founded a lobbying firm with longtime chief of staff Pierre Chateauvert. In 2005, he was appointed executive officer of the Quebec Forest Council, a private association defending the forestry industry.

== See also ==
- Politics of Quebec
- List of Quebec general elections
- List of Quebec leaders of the Opposition
- Timeline of Quebec history

Preceded by Robert Quenneville (Liberal)	MNA, District of Joliette; 1976–2002	Succeeded by Sylvie Lespérance (ADQ)
Preceded by Gérard D. Lervesque (Liberal)	Official Opposition House Leader; 1985–1987	Succeeded by François Gendron (PQ)
Preceded by Pierre-Marc Johnson (PQ)	Leader of the Opposition in Quebec; 1987–1989	Succeeded by Jacques Parizeau (PQ)
Preceded by François Gendron (PQ)	Official Opposition House Leader; 1989–1994	Succeeded by Pierre Paradis (Liberal)
