= Pascal Beaupré =

Canadian politician (born 1983)

MNA for Joliette
- In office April 25, 2007 – November 5, 2008
- Preceded by: Jonathan Valois
- Succeeded by: Véronique Hivon

Personal details
- Born: March 20, 1983 (age 43) Joliette, Quebec, Canada
- Party: Action démocratique du Québec
- Profession: Lawyer

Pascal Beaupré (born March 20, 1983) is a Canadian politician from Quebec. He was an Action démocratique du Québec member of the National Assembly for the district of Joliette from 2007 to 2008.

Born in Joliette, Quebec, Beaupré graduated with a bachelor's degree in law from the Université de Montréal and was admitted to the bar in 2005. He practised law for the next two years. Prior to being a member of the ADQ, he was a president of the federal Liberal Party of Canada riding association in Joliette.

Beaupré was first elected in 2007 with 37% of the vote. Parti Québécois star candidate Claude Duceppe, the brother of Bloc Québécois leader Gilles Duceppe, finished second with 35% of the vote. He took office on April 12, 2007.

In the 2008 election, Beaupré lost re-election against PQ candidate Véronique Hivon. He was a candidate for the Quebec Liberal Party in the 2012 election.
