= Mathieu Lebrun =

Canadian politician

Mathieu Lebrun MNA

Member of the National Assembly for Rousseau
- Incumbent
- Assumed office October 5, 2026
- Preceded by: Louis-Charles Thouin

Personal details
- Party: Parti Québécois

Mathieu Lebrun is a Canadian politician who is a candidate for the National Assembly of Quebec for Rousseau in the 2026 Quebec general election as a member of the Parti Québécois.

Lebrun is a graduate of the University of Montreal and the University of Sherbrooke. From 2021 to his election, he served as the mediator-conciliator at the Ministry of Labour. Lebrun was appointed Minister of Labour, Employment and Social Solidarity in 2026.

== Electoral record ==
2026 Quebec general election: Rousseau
** Preliminary results — Not yet official **
Party	Candidate	Votes	%	±%
Parti Québécois	Mathieu Lebrun	13,634	44.07	
Conservative	Marie-Ève Boucher	8,645	27.95	
Coalition Avenir Québec	Louis-Charles Thouin	3,932	12.71	
Liberal	Sashmir Sidney	2,513	8.12	
Québec solidaire	Hind Rihani	2,211	7.15	
Total valid votes				
Total rejected ballots				
Turnout			64.06	
Parti Québécois gain from Coalition Avenir Québec		Swing		+
Source: Élections Québec
