= Jonathan Valois =

Canadian politician

MNA for Joliette
- In office 2003–2007
- Preceded by: Sylvie Lespérance
- Succeeded by: Pascal Beaupré

Personal details
- Born: February 7, 1971 (age 55) Sorel-Tracy, Quebec
- Party: Parti Québécois

Jonathan Valois (French pronunciation: [ʒɔnatɑ̃ valwa]; born February 7, 1971, in Sorel-Tracy, Quebec) is a politician from Quebec, Canada, and the former Member of the National Assembly for the electoral district of Joliette.

He was elected in the 2003 Quebec general election but declined to run for re-election in 2007.

He was a former participant in the Quebec student's parliament and leader of the youth organization of the Parti Québécois.

He served as president of the Parti Québécois from February 22, 2009, until 2011.
