= Louis-Charles Thouin =

Canadian politician

Member of the National Assembly of Quebec for Rousseau
- In office October 1, 2018 – August 27, 2026
- Preceded by: Nicolas Marceau
- Succeeded by: Mathieu Lebrun

Personal details
- Party: Coalition Avenir Québec

Louis-Charles Thouin is a Canadian politician, who was elected to the National Assembly of Quebec in the 2018 provincial election. On March 30, 2021, he withdrew from the CAQ caucus amid an ethics probe. He represented the electoral district of Rousseau as a member of the Coalition Avenir Québec after being elected in the 2022 Quebec general election.

He was the mayor of Saint-Calixte, Quebec from 2009 to 2017 and served as the Warden for the Montcalm Regional County Municipality from 2017 to 2018.

== Electoral record ==
2026 Quebec general election: Rousseau
** Preliminary results — Not yet official **
| Party | Candidate | Votes | % | ±% |
|---|---|---|---|---|
| Parti Québécois | Mathieu Lebrun | 13,634 | 44.07 | |
| Conservative | Marie-Ève Boucher | 8,645 | 27.95 | |
| Coalition Avenir Québec | Louis-Charles Thouin | 3,932 | 12.71 | |
| Liberal | Sashmir Sidney | 2,513 | 8.12 | |
| Québec solidaire | Hind Rihani | 2,211 | 7.15 | |
| Total valid votes | | | | |
| Total rejected ballots | | | | |
| Turnout | | | 64.06 | |
| Parti Québécois gain from Coalition Avenir Québec | | Swing | | + |
Source: Élections Québec

2022 Quebec general election: Rousseau
| Party | Candidate | Votes | % | ±% |
|---|---|---|---|---|
| Coalition Avenir Québec | Louis-Charles Thouin | 14,117 | 50.58 | -2.66 |
| Parti Québécois | Pierre Vanier | 4,985 | 17.86 | -8.49 |
| Conservative | Gisèle DesRoches | 4,180 | 14.98 | +13.98 |
| Québec solidaire | Ernesto Castro Roch | 3,667 | 13.14 | +0.14 |
| Liberal | Estelle Regina Lokrou | 963 | 3.45 | -1.77 |
| Total valid votes | | 27,912 | 97.96 | – |
| Total rejected ballots | | 580 | 2.04 | -0.05 |
| Turnout | | 28,492 | 61.49 | -4.67 |
| Electors on the lists | | 46,339 | – | – |
| Coalition Avenir Québec hold | | Swing | | +2.92 |

2018 Quebec general election: Rousseau
| Party | Candidate | Votes | % | ±% |
|---|---|---|---|---|
| Coalition Avenir Québec | Louis-Charles Thouin | 14,464 | 53.24 | +16.54 |
| Parti Québécois | Nicolas Marceau | 7,160 | 26.35 | -12.38 |
| Québec solidaire | Hélène Dubé | 3,531 | 13.00 | +6.62 |
| Liberal | Patrick Watson | 1,419 | 5.22 | -12.07 |
| Citoyens au pouvoir | Michel Lacasse | 323 | 1.19 | |
| Conservative | Richard Evanko | 271 | 1.00 | |
| Total valid votes | | 27,168 | 97.91 | |
| Total rejected ballots | | 580 | 2.09 | |
| Turnout | | 27,748 | 66.15 | |
| Eligible voters | | 41,944 | | |
| Coalition Avenir Québec gain from Parti Québécois | | Swing | | +14.46 |
Source(s) "Rapport des résultats officiels du scrutin". Élections Québec.
