= Rousseau (electoral district) =

Provincial electoral district in Quebec, Canada

Coordinates: 45.98°N 73.81°W

Quebec electoral district

Provincial electoral district
- Legislature: National Assembly of Quebec
MNA
Mathieu Lebrun
Parti Québécois
- District created: 1980
- First contested: 1981
- Last contested: 2026

Demographics
- Population (2011): 77,610
- Electors (2012): 60,677
- Area (km²): 1,298.6
- Pop. density (per km²): 59.8
- Census division: Montcalm
- Census subdivision(s): Saint-Alexis, Saint-Calixte, Saint-Esprit, Saint-Hippolyte, Sainte-Julienne, Saint-Lin–Laurentides, Saint-Roch-de-l'Achigan, Saint-Roch-Ouest, Sainte-Sophie

Rousseau is a provincial electoral district in the Lanaudière and Laurentides regions of Quebec, Canada, that elects members to the National Assembly of Quebec. It notably includes the municipalities of Saint-Lin–Laurentides and Sainte-Julienne.

It was created for the 1981 election from parts of the Prévost, Joliette-Montcalm and L'Assomption electoral districts.

In the change from the 2001 to the 2011 electoral map, it gained Chertsey and Saint-Hippolyte from Bertrand, but lost L'Épiphanie (town), L'Épiphanie (parish), and the part of the city of L'Assomption that it formerly had to the L'Assomption electoral district.

In the change from the 2011 to the 2017 electoral map, it will gain Saint-Jacques, Saint-Liguori and Sainte-Marie-Salomé from Joliette and will lose Chertsey and Rawdon to Bertrand and Sainte-Sophie and Saint-Hippolyte to the new riding of Prévost.

It was named after botany professor Jacques Rousseau.

== Members of the National Assembly ==
Legislature	Years	Member	Party
Riding created from Prévost, Joliette-Montcalm and L'Assomption
32nd	1981–1985	René Blouin	Parti Québécois
33rd	1985–1989	Robert Thérien	Liberal
34th	1989–1994	Robert Thérien	Liberal
35th	1994–1998	Lévis Brien	Parti Québécois
36th	1998–2003	François Legault	Parti Québécois
37th	2003–2007	François Legault	Parti Québécois
38th	2007–2008	François Legault	Parti Québécois
39th	2008–2009	François Legault	Parti Québécois
39th	2009–2012	Nicolas Marceau	Parti Québécois
40th	2012–2014	Nicolas Marceau	Parti Québécois
41st	2014–2018	Nicolas Marceau	Parti Québécois
42nd	2018–2021	Louis-Charles Thouin	Coalition Avenir Québec
42nd	2021–2021	Louis-Charles Thouin	Independent
42nd	2021–2022	Louis-Charles Thouin	Coalition Avenir Québec
43rd	2022–2026	Louis-Charles Thouin	Coalition Avenir Québec
44th	2026–Present	Mathieu Lebrun	Parti Québécois

== Election results ==
2026 Quebec general election
** Preliminary results — Not yet official **
Party	Candidate	Votes	%	±%
Parti Québécois	Ariane Boyer	12,745	35.29	
Conservative	Louise Moreault	8,306	23.00	
Coalition Avenir Québec	Amélie Dionne	7,110	19.69	
Liberal	Karine Malenfant	5,189	14.37	
Québec solidaire	Pierre-Erik Isabelle	2,434	6.74	
Climat Québec	Carole Sierpien	330	0.91	
Total valid votes				
Total rejected ballots				
Turnout			70.23	
Electors on the lists			–	–
Parti Québécois gain from Coalition Avenir Québec		Swing		+20.43
Source: Élections Québec

2022 Quebec general election
Party	Candidate	Votes	%	±%
Coalition Avenir Québec	Louis-Charles Thouin	14,117	50.58	-2.66
Parti Québécois	Pierre Vanier	4,985	17.86	-8.49
Conservative	Gisèle DesRoches	4,180	14.98	+13.98
Québec solidaire	Ernesto Castro Roch	3,667	13.14	+0.14
Liberal	Estelle Regina Lokrou	963	3.45	-1.77
Total valid votes		27,912	97.96	–
Total rejected ballots		580	2.04	-0.05
Turnout		28,492	61.49	-4.67
Electors on the lists		46,339	–	–
Coalition Avenir Québec hold		Swing		+2.92

2018 Quebec general election
Party	Candidate	Votes	%	±%
Coalition Avenir Québec	Louis-Charles Thouin	14,464	53.24	+16.54
Parti Québécois	Nicolas Marceau	7,160	26.35	-12.38
Québec solidaire	Hélène Dubé	3,531	13.00	+6.62
Liberal	Patrick Watson	1,419	5.22	-12.07
Citoyens au pouvoir	Michel Lacasse	323	1.19	
Conservative	Richard Evanko	271	1.00	
Total valid votes		27,168	97.91	
Total rejected ballots		580	2.09	
Turnout		27,748	66.15	
Eligible voters		41,944		
Coalition Avenir Québec gain from Parti Québécois		Swing		+14.46
Source(s) "Rapport des résultats officiels du scrutin". Élections Québec.

2014 Quebec general election
Party	Candidate	Votes	%	±%
Parti Québécois	Nicolas Marceau	15,480	38.73	-2.99
Coalition Avenir Québec	Claude Charette	14,667	36.70	-2.45
Liberal	Mario Racette	6,911	17.29	+5.35
Québec solidaire	François Lépine	2,548	6.38	+1.39
Option nationale	Chantal St-Onge	362	0.91	-0.33
Total valid votes		39,968	98.13	–
Total rejected ballots		762	1.87	–
Turnout		40,730	64.47	-8.07
Electors on the lists		63,181	–	–
Parti Québécois hold		Swing		-0.27

2012 Quebec general election
Party	Candidate	Votes	%	±%
Parti Québécois	Nicolas Marceau	18,112	41.72	-13.29
Coalition Avenir Québec	Laurence R. Fortin	16,996	39.15	+31.27
Liberal	Mario Racette	5,186	11.95	-18.20
Québec solidaire	François Lépine	2,163	4.98	+1.06
Option nationale	Gilles Chapdelaine	536	1.24	–
Independent	Robert Boucher	232	0.53	–
Parti indépendantiste	André Matteau	189	0.44	–
Total valid votes		43,414	98.44	–
Total rejected ballots		686	1.56	–
Turnout		44,100	72.54	
Electors on the lists		60,795	–	–
Parti Québécois hold		Swing		-22.28

^ Change is from redistributed results. CAQ change is from ADQ.

Quebec provincial by-election, September 21, 2009
Party	Candidate	Votes	%	±%
Parti Québécois	Nicolas Marceau	9,529	57.03	+0.26
Liberal	Michel Fafard	5,148	30.81	+8.48
Action démocratique	Jean-Pierre Parrot	782	4.68	-11.73
Québec solidaire	Francois Lépine	735	4.40	+1.96
Green	Guy Rainville	514	3.08	+1.03
Total valid votes		16,708	98.72	–
Total rejected ballots		216	1.28	–
Turnout		16,924	30.23	-23.79
Electors on the lists		55,979	–	–

2008 Quebec general election
Party	Candidate	Votes	%	±%
Parti Québécois	François Legault	16,513	56.77	+14.99
Liberal	Michel Fafard	6,494	22.33	+6.95
Action démocratique	Jean-Pierre Parrot	4,774	16.41	-21.35
Québec solidaire	Francois Lépine	709	2.44	+0.19
Green	J. Michel Popik	595	2.05	-0.78
Total valid votes		29,085	98.44	–
Total rejected ballots		461	1.56	–
Turnout		29,546	54.02	-15.01
Electors on the lists		54,695	–	–

2007 Quebec general election
Party	Candidate	Votes	%	±%
Parti Québécois	François Legault	14,670	41.78	-6.07
Action démocratique	Jean-Pierre Parrot	13,260	37.76	+18.57
Liberal	Yves Prud'Homme	5,402	15.38	-15.64
Green	Richard Chatagneau	992	2.83	–
Québec solidaire	Alex Boisdequin-Lefort	789	2.25	+1.15
Total valid votes		35,113	98.78	–
Total rejected ballots		435	1.22	–
Turnout		35,548	69.03	+4.06
Electors on the lists		51,494	–	–

2003 Quebec general election
Party	Candidate	Votes	%	±%
Parti Québécois	François Legault	14,079	47.85	-7.50
Liberal	Michel F. Brunet	9,127	31.02	+1.83
Action démocratique	François Girouard	5,645	19.19	+4.48
UFP	Alex Boisdequin-Lefort	324	1.10	–
Christian Democracy	Gérard Gauthier	249	0.85	–

1998 Quebec general election
Party	Candidate	Votes	%	±%
Parti Québécois	François Legault	18,076	55.35	+1.49
Liberal	John A. Redmond	9,533	29.19	-2.84
Action démocratique	Clément Lévesque	4,805	14.71	+3.00
Socialist Democracy	Francis Martin	243	0.74	-1.32

1995 Quebec referendum
Side	Votes	%
Oui	24,237	63.92
Non	13,679	36.08

1994 Quebec general election
Party	Candidate	Votes	%	±%
Parti Québécois	Lévis Brien	16,532	53.86	+14.11
Liberal	Roger Beausoleil	9,833	32.03	-28.22
Action démocratique	Guy Cloutier	3,595	11.71	–
New Democratic	Gilles Garneau	631	2.06	–
Republic of Canada	Christiane Deland-Gervais	106	0.35	–
Total valid votes		30,697	98.04	
Rejected and declined votes		613	1.96	-2.11
Turnout		31,310	77.66	+6.03
Electors on the lists		40,316		
Source: Results, Government of Quebec
Parti Québécois gain from Liberal		Swing		+21.17

1992 Charlottetown Accord referendum
Side	Votes	%
Non	24,147	65.10
Oui	12,944	34.90

1989 Quebec general election
Party	Candidate	Votes	%	±%
Liberal	Robert Thérien	17,292	60.25	+5.11
Parti Québécois	Murielle Angers-Turpin	11,410	39.75	-2.29

== See also ==
- List of Quebec provincial electoral districts
- Canadian provincial electoral districts
