= Sylvie Lespérance =

Canadian politician (1954–2006)

MNA for Joliette
- In office 2002–2003
- Preceded by: Guy Chevrette
- Succeeded by: Jonathan Valois

Personal details
- Born: December 21, 1954 Jonquière, Quebec, Canada
- Died: September 22, 2006 (aged 51) Saint-Alphonse-Rodriguez, Quebec, Canada
- Party: Action démocratique du Québec

Sylvie Lespérance (December 21, 1954 – September 22, 2006) was a politician in Quebec who served as the Action démocratique du Québec member of the National Assembly for the electoral district of Joliette from 2002 to 2003.

Lespérance, who was born in Jonquière, had been a lifelong Liberal supporter months before she first was elected to the National Assembly.

She ran unsuccessfully against Parti Québécois cabinet member Guy Chevrette in the 1989 and 1998 elections.

She was elected to the National Assembly in a by-election held on June 17, 2002 with 38% of the vote. Parti Québécois star candidate and Bloc Québécois Member of Parliament Michel Bellehumeur finished second with 32% of the vote.

In 2003 election, Lespérance finished third with 21% of the vote.

Lespérance died on September 22, 2006, in Saint-Alphonse-Rodriguez at the age of 51.
