= Joliette (provincial electoral district) =

Provincial electoral district in Quebec, Canada

Coordinates: 46.016°N 73.497°W

Quebec electoral district

Provincial electoral district
- Legislature: National Assembly of Quebec
MNA
Véronique Venne
Parti Québécois
- District created: 1867
- District abolished: 1972
- District re-created: 1980
- First contested: 1981
- Last contested: 2026

Demographics
- Population (2001): 59,464
- Electors (2012): 56,246
- Area (km²): 575.6
- Pop. density (per km²): 103.3
- Census division(s): Joliette (all), Montcalm (part)
- Census subdivision(s): Crabtree, Joliette, Notre-Dame-de-Lourdes, Notre-Dame-des-Prairies, Saint-Ambroise-de-Kildare, Saint-Charles-Borromée, Saint-Jacques, Saint-Liguori, Sainte-Marie-Salomé, Sainte-Mélanie, Saint-Paul, Saint-Pierre, Saint-Thomas

Joliette (French pronunciation: [ʒɔljɛt]) is a provincial electoral district in the Lanaudière region of Quebec, Canada, that elects members to the National Assembly of Quebec. It notably includes the cities of Joliette and Saint-Charles-Borromée.

It was created for the 1867 election (and an electoral district of that name existed earlier in the Legislative Assembly of the Province of Canada). Its final election was in 1970. It disappeared in the 1973 election and its successor electoral district was Joliette-Montcalm.

However, Joliette-Montcalm disappeared in the 1981 election and Joliette was recreated from parts of Joliette-Montcalm and Berthier electoral districts.

In the change from the 2001 to the 2011 electoral map, it lost Sainte-Marcelline-de-Kildare to Berthier electoral district but gained Sainte-Mélanie from that same electoral district.

In the change from the 2011 to the 2017 electoral map, the riding will lose Saint-Jacques, Saint-Liguori and Sainte-Marie-Salomé to the riding of Rousseau.

== Members of the Legislative Assembly / National Assembly ==
Legislature	Years	Member	Party
1st	1867–1871	Vincent-Paul Lavallée	Conservative
2nd	1871–1875	Vincent-Paul Lavallée	Conservative
3rd	1875–1878	Vincent-Paul Lavallée	Conservative
4th	1878–1881	Vincent-Paul Lavallée	Conservative
5th	1881–1885	Vincent-Paul Lavallée	Conservative
5th	1885–1886	Joseph-Norbert-Alfred McConville	Conservative
6th	1886–1890	Louis Basinet	Liberal
7th	1890–1892	Louis Basinet	Liberal
8th	1892–1897	Joseph-Mathias Tellier	Conservative
9th	1897–1900	Joseph-Mathias Tellier	Conservative
10th	1900–1904	Joseph-Mathias Tellier	Conservative
11th	1904–1908	Joseph-Mathias Tellier	Conservative
12th	1908–1912	Joseph-Mathias Tellier	Conservative
13th	1912–1916	Joseph-Mathias Tellier	Conservative
14th	1916–1919	Ernest Hébert	Liberal
15th	1919–1923	Pierre-Joseph Dufresne	Conservative
16th	1923–1927	Pierre-Joseph Dufresne	Conservative
17th	1927–1931	Lucien Dugas	Liberal
18th	1931–1935	Lucien Dugas	Liberal
19th	1935–1936	Lucien Dugas	Liberal
20th	1936–1939	Antonio Barrette	Union Nationale
21st	1939–1944	Antonio Barrette	Union Nationale
22nd	1944–1948	Antonio Barrette	Union Nationale
23rd	1948–1952	Antonio Barrette	Union Nationale
24th	1952–1956	Antonio Barrette	Union Nationale
25th	1956–1960	Antonio Barrette	Union Nationale
26th	1960–1962	Gaston Lambert	Liberal
27th	1962–1966	Maurice Majeau	Union Nationale
28th	1966–1970	Pierre Roy	Union Nationale
29th	1970–1973	Robert Quenneville	Liberal
Riding dissolved into Joliette-Montcalm
Riding re-created from Joliette-Montcalm and Berthier
32nd	1981–1985	Guy Chevrette	Parti Québécois
33rd	1985–1989	Guy Chevrette	Parti Québécois
34th	1989–1994	Guy Chevrette	Parti Québécois
35th	1994–1998	Guy Chevrette	Parti Québécois
36th	1998–2002	Guy Chevrette	Parti Québécois
36th	2002–2003	Sylvie Lespérance	Action démocratique
37th	2003–2007	Jonathan Valois	Parti Québécois
38th	2007–2008	Pascal Beaupré	Action démocratique
39th	2008–2012	Véronique Hivon	Parti Québécois
40th	2012–2014	Véronique Hivon	Parti Québécois
41st	2014–2018	Véronique Hivon	Parti Québécois
42nd	2018–2022	Véronique Hivon	Parti Québécois
43rd	2022–2026	François St-Louis	Coalition Avenir Québec
44th	2026–Present	Véronique Venne	Parti Québécois

== Election results ==
2026 Quebec general election
** Preliminary results — Not yet official **
Party	Candidate	Votes	%	±%
Parti Québécois	Véronique Venne	18,368	45.04	+13.81
Coalition Avenir Québec	Clodine Desrochers	7,227	17.72	–27.86
Conservative	Rémi Lafrenière	7,138	17.50	+8.68
Liberal	Sana Arfaoui	3,775	9.26	+6.26
Québec solidaire	Flavie Trudel	3,541	8.68	–2.70
Parti nul	David Chouinard	268	0.66	N/A
Green	Boris Geynet	235	0.58	N/A
Présence	Xavie Jean-Bourgeault	118	0.29	N/A
Climat Québec	Sophie Sarrazin	113	0.28	N/A
Total valid votes		40,783	98.10	–0.20
Total rejected ballots		792	1.90	+0.20
Turnout		41,575	69.99	+0.23
Electors on the lists		59,404		
Parti Québécois gain from Coalition Avenir Québec		Swing		+20.84
Source: Élections Québec

2022 Quebec general election
Party	Candidate	Votes	%	±%
Coalition Avenir Québec	François St-Louis	17,925	45.58	+10.93
Parti Québécois	Véronique Venne	12,281	31.23	-15.01
Québec solidaire	Flavie Trudel	4,476	11.38	+1.23
Conservative	Pascal Laurin	3,470	8.82	–
Liberal	Diana Mélissa Crispin	1,178	3.00	-3.85
Total valid votes		39,330	98.30	–
Total rejected ballots		680	1.70	+0.08
Turnout		40,010	69.76	-2.16
Electors on the lists		57,352	–	–
Coalition Avenir Québec gain from Parti Québécois		Swing		+12.97

2018 Quebec general election
Party	Candidate	Votes	%	±%
Parti Québécois	Véronique Hivon	17,685	46.23	+1.9
Coalition Avenir Québec	François St-Louis	13,254	34.65	+7.58
Québec solidaire	Judith Sicard	3,881	10.15	+2.88
Liberal	Emilie Imbeault	2,620	6.85	-12.63
Green	Étienne St-Jean	528	1.38	
Citoyens au pouvoir	Sébastien Dupuis	283	0.74	
Total valid votes		38,251	98.38	
Total rejected ballots		630	1.62	
Turnout		38,881	71.93	
Eligible voters		54,057		
Parti Québécois hold		Swing		-2.84
Source(s) "Rapport des résultats officiels du scrutin". Élections Québec.

2014 Quebec general election
Party	Candidate	Votes	%	±%
Parti Québécois	Véronique Hivon	17,477	44.33	-2.79
Coalition Avenir Québec	Denise Larouche	10,671	27.07	-2.82
Liberal	Robert Corriveau	7,681	19.48	+5.46
Québec solidaire	Flavie Trudel	2,866	7.27	+1.64
Option nationale	Sylvain Legault	510	1.29	-0.20
Conservative	Mikey Colangelo Lauzon	220	0.56	+0.09
Total valid votes		39,425	98.00	
Total rejected ballots		804	2.00	+0.62
Turnout		40,229	69.85	-8.48
Electors on the lists		57,591	–	
Parti Québécois hold		Swing		+0.02

- 2014 source:

2012 Quebec general election
Party	Candidate	Votes	%	±%
Parti Québécois	Véronique Hivon	20,509	47.12	+1.03
Coalition Avenir Québec	Normand Masse	13,009	29.89	
Liberal	Pascal Beaupré	6,102	14.02	-14.81
Québec solidaire	Flavie Trudel	2,449	5.63	+0.76
Option nationale	Amélie Dolbec	649	1.49	
Independent	Jean-Mathieu Desmarais	513	1.18	
Conservative	Mikey Colangelo Lauzon	202	0.46	
Quebec Citizens' Union	Michel Thouin	92	0.21	
Total valid votes		43,525	98.62	
Total rejected ballots		610	1.38	
Turnout		44,135	78.34	
Electors on the lists		56,340	–	

- 2012 source:

2008 Quebec general election
Party	Candidate	Votes	%	±%
Parti Québécois	Véronique Hivon	14,666	46.09	+11.02
Liberal	Christian Trudel	9,175	28.83	+8.61
Action démocratique	Pascal Beaupré	6,185	19.44	-17.64
Québec solidaire	Flavie Trudel	1,549	4.87	+0.32
Independent	Pablo Lugo-Herrera	246	0.77	-

2007 Quebec general election
Party	Candidate	Votes	%	±%
Action démocratique	Pascal Beaupré	13,805	37.08	+15.65
Parti Québécois	Claude Duceppe	13,055	35.07	-4.41
Liberal	Céline Beaulieu	7,527	20.22	-13.40
Québec solidaire	Flavie Trudel	1,693	4.55	+1.09*
Green	Johanne Edsell	1,149	3.09	-

* Increase is from UFP

2003 Quebec general election
Party	Candidate	Votes	%	±%
Parti Québécois	Jonathan Valois	13,104	39.48	+7.58
Liberal	Robert Groulx	11,161	33.62	+8.89
Action démocratique	Sylvie Lespérance	7,114	21.43	-16.97
UFP	Mathieu Lessard	1,149	3.46	-1.51
Bloc Pot	Marco Geoffroy	667	2.01	-

Joliette by-election, June 17, 2002
Party	Candidate	Votes	%	±%
Action démocratique	Sylvie Lespérance	10,970	38.40	+23.33
Parti Québécois	Michel Bellehumeur	9,115	31.90	-24.25
Liberal	Pierre Delangis	7,064	24.73	-2.62
Independent (UFP)	Mathieu Lessard	1,421	4.97	-

1998 Quebec general election
Party	Candidate	Votes	%	±%
Parti Québécois	Guy Chevrette	19,784	56.15	-8.56
Liberal	Sylvie Lespérance	9,636	27.35	+1.61
Action démocratique	Olivier Hamel	5,310	15.07	+7.24
Socialist Democracy	Alexandre Martel	504	1.43	-

1995 Quebec referendum
Side	Votes	%
Oui	25,099	63.88
Non	14,190	36.12

1994 Quebec general election
Party	Candidate	Votes	%	±%
Parti Québécois	Guy Chevrette	21,903	64.71	+4.03
Liberal	Pierre Delangis	8,712	25.74	-3.80
Action démocratique	Clément Lévesque	2,651	7.83	-
Natural Law	Gilles Roy	581	1.72	-

1992 Charlottetown Accord referendum
Side	Votes	%
Non	23,892	70.32
Oui	10,086	29.68

1989 Quebec general election
Party	Candidate	Votes	%	±%
Parti Québécois	Guy Chevrette	18,582	60.68	+10.15
Liberal	Sylvie Lespérance	9,045	29.54	-13.80
Green	Gaétan Riopel-Savignac	2,854	9.32	+6.25
Marxist–Leninist	Jean-François Desroches	91	0.30	-
Communist	Montserrat Escola	51	0.17	-0.02

1985 Quebec general election
Party	Candidate	Votes	%	±%
Parti Québécois	Guy Chevrette	15,288	50.53	-1.42
Liberal	Donatien Corriveau	13,113	43.34	+7.92
Green	Gaétan Riopel-Savignac	929	3.07	-
Progressive Conservative	Michel Carignan	659	2.18	-
Socialist Movement	Denise Lacombe	152	0.50	–
Communist	Robert Aubin	59	0.19	-
Christian Socialist	Marlène Labelle	58	0.19	-

1981 Quebec general election
Party	Candidate	Votes	%	±%
Parti Québécois	Guy Chevrette	16,343	51.95	+9.54
Liberal	André Asselin	11,143	35.42	+7.26
Union Nationale	Michel Carignan	3,971	12.63	-13.16

1970 Quebec general election
Party	Candidate	Votes	%	±%
Liberal	Robert Quenneville	10,929	40.32	-0.62
Union Nationale	Pierre Roy	7,694	28.39	-22.57
Parti Québécois	Bernard Landry	7,376	27.21	-
Ralliement créditiste	Aurélien Neveu	1,107	4.08	-

1966 Quebec general election
Party	Candidate	Votes	%	±%
Union Nationale	Pierre Roy	11,372	50.96	-2.00
Liberal	Maurice Desrochers	9,136	40.94	+14.04
RIN	Laurent Mailhot	1,423	6.38	-
Ralliement national	René Bonin	386	1.73	-

1962 Quebec general election
Party		Candidate	Votes	%
	Union Nationale	Maurice Majeau	10,236	52.96
	Liberal	Gaston Lambert	5,199	26.90
}	Independent Lib.	Maurice Desrochers	3,891	20.13

Joliette by-election, November 23, 1960
Party	Candidate	Votes	%
Liberal	Gaston Lambert	10,361	62.72
Union Nationale	Claude-Édouard Hétu	5,148	31.16
Independent	J.-Marcel Ostiguy	1,011	6.12

1960 Quebec general election
Party	Candidate	Votes	%
Union Nationale	Antonio Barrette	12,479	64.75
Liberal	Joseph-Aimé-Conrad Boisvert	6,794	35.25

1956 Quebec general election
Party	Candidate	Votes	%
Union Nationale	Antonio Barrette	11,500	64.88
Liberal	Joseph-Aimé-Conrad Boisvert	6,225	35.12

1952 Quebec general election
Party	Candidate	Votes	%
Union Nationale	Antonio Barrette	10,281	57.88
Liberal	Georges-Émile Lapalme	7,482	42.12

1948 Quebec general election
Party	Candidate	Votes	%
Union Nationale	Antonio Barrette	10,482	64.99
Liberal	Maurice Breton	5,452	33.80
Union of Electors	A.-Émile Ducharme	195	1.21

1944 Quebec general election
Party	Candidate	Votes	%
Union Nationale	Antonio Barrette	8,652	61.83
Liberal	Victor Masse	4,997	35.71
Bloc populaire	Yvon Ricard	344	2.46

1939 Quebec general election
Party	Candidate	Votes	%
Union Nationale	Antonio Barrette	3,466	51.82
Liberal	Lucien Dugas	3,223	48.18

1936 Quebec general election
Party	Candidate	Votes	%
Union Nationale	Antonio Barrette	3,595	53.97
Liberal	Lucien Dugas	3,066	46.03

1935 Quebec general election
Party	Candidate	Votes	%
Liberal	Lucien Dugas	3,484	53.32
Conservative	Antonio Barrette	3,050	46.68

1931 Quebec general election
Party	Candidate	Votes	%
Liberal	Lucien Dugas	3,089	54.70
Conservative	Robert Tellier	2,558	45.30

1927 Quebec general election
Party	Candidate	Votes	%
Liberal	Lucien Dugas	3,170	59.04
Conservative	Pierre-Joseph Dufresne	2,199	40.96

1923 Quebec general election
Party	Candidate	Votes	%
Conservative	Pierre-Joseph Dufresne	2,857	55.80
Liberal	Lucien Dugas	2,263	44.20

1919 Quebec general election
Party	Candidate	Votes	%
Conservative	Pierre-Joseph Dufresne	2,174	51.49
Liberal	Ernest Hébert	2,048	48.51

1916 Quebec general election
Party	Candidate	Votes	%
Liberal	Ernest Hébert	2,484	52.67
Conservative	Joseph-Pierre Laporte	2,232	47.33

1912 Quebec general election
Party	Candidate	Votes	%
Conservative	Joseph-Mathias Tellier	2,408	50.43
Liberal	Joseph Gadoury	2,367	49.57

1908 Quebec general election
Party	Candidate	Votes	%
Conservative	Joseph-Mathias Tellier	2,065	50.33
Liberal	Joseph Gadoury	2,038	49.67

1904 Quebec general election
Party	Candidate	Votes	%
Conservative	Joseph-Mathias Tellier	2,030	54.00
Liberal	Gédéon Desrosiers	1,729	46.00

1900 Quebec general election
Party	Candidate	Votes	%
Conservative	Joseph-Mathias Tellier	1,868	52.09
Liberal	Joseph Gadoury	1,718	47.91

1897 Quebec general election
Party	Candidate	Votes	%
Conservative	Joseph-Mathias Tellier	1,747	50.40
Liberal	François-Octave Dugas	1,733	49.80

1892 Quebec general election
Party	Candidate	Votes	%
Conservative	Joseph-Mathias Tellier	1,678	51.02
Liberal	Louis Basinet	1,611	48.98

1890 Quebec general election
Party	Candidate	Votes	%
Liberal	Louis Basinet	acclaimed	

Joliette by-election, October 24, 1889
Party	Candidate	Votes	%
Liberal	Louis Basinet	1,496	53.54
Conservative	Onésime Perreault	1,298	46.46

1886 Quebec general election
Party	Candidate	Votes	%
Liberal	Louis Basinet	1,414	51.44
Conservative	Joseph-Norbert-Alfred McConville	1,335	48.56

Joliette by-election, September 25, 1885
Party	Candidate	Votes	%
Conservative	Joseph-Norbert-Alfred McConville	1,304	50.27
Liberal	Louis Basinet	1,290	49.73

1881 Quebec general election
Party		Candidate	Votes	%
	Conservative	Vincent-Paul Lavallée	797	39.40
	Liberal	Auguste Guilbaut	709	35.05
}	Independent Cons.	Édouard Guilbaut	517	25.56

1878 Quebec general election
Party	Candidate	Votes	%
Conservative	Vincent-Paul Lavallée	1,156	54.94
Liberal	Auguste Guilbaut	948	45.06

1875 Quebec general election
Party	Candidate	Votes	%
Conservative	Vincent-Paul Lavallée	acclaimed	

1871 Quebec general election
Party	Candidate	Votes	%
Conservative	Vincent-Paul Lavallée	1,068	70.08
Liberal	François-Benjamin Godin	456	29.92

1867 Quebec general election
Party	Candidate	Votes	%
Conservative	Vincent-Paul Lavallée	930	52.04
Liberal	Cornellier dit Grand-Champ, H.	857	47.96

== See also ==
- List of Quebec provincial electoral districts
- Canadian provincial electoral districts
