= 1912 Quebec general election =

Canadian provincial election

| ← 1908 | May 15, 1912 | 1916 → |

81 seats in the 13th Legislative Assembly of Quebec 41 seats were needed for a majority
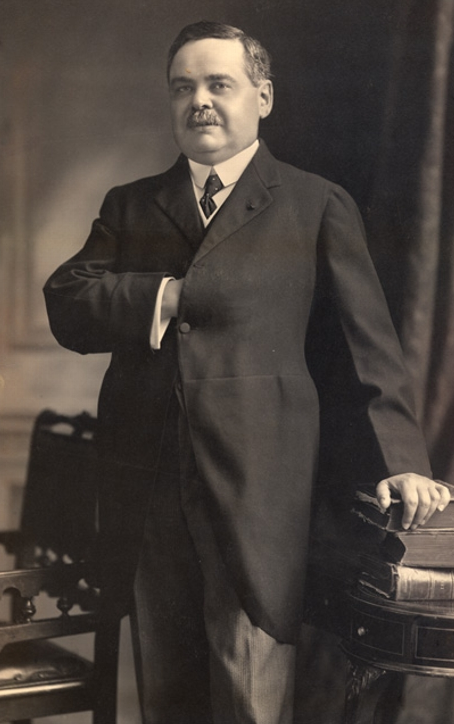

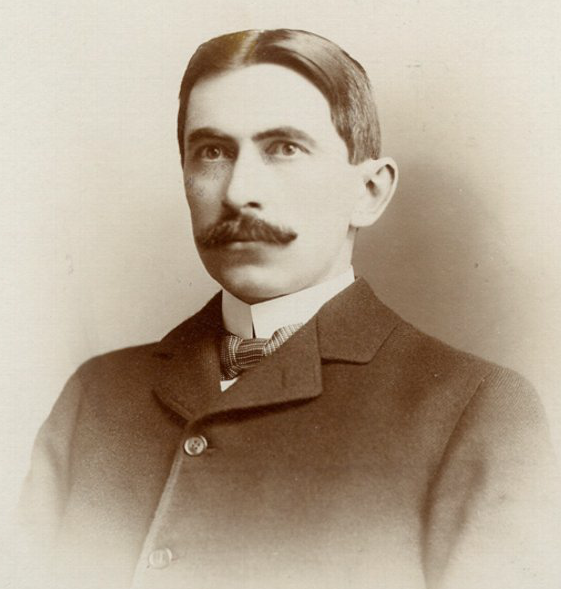
| | First party | Second party |
|---|---|---|
| Leader | Lomer Gouin | Joseph-Mathias Tellier |
| Party | Liberal | Conservative |
| Leader since | 1905 | 1909 |
| Leader's seat | Portneuf | Joliette |
| Last election | 57 seats, 53.53% | 14 seats, 39.92% |
| Seats won | 62 | 16 |
| Seat change | ▲5 | ▲2 |
| Popular vote | 155,958 | 125,277 |
| Percentage | 53.54% | 43.01% |
| Swing | ▲0.01pp | ▲3.09pp |
Premier before election
Lomer Gouin
Liberal
Premier after election
Lomer Gouin
Liberal

The 1912 Quebec general election was held on May 15, 1912, to elect members of the 13th Legislative Assembly of the Province of Quebec, Canada. The incumbent Quebec Liberal Party, led by Lomer Gouin, was re-elected, defeating the Quebec Conservative Party, led by Joseph-Mathias Tellier.

== Redistribution of ridings ==
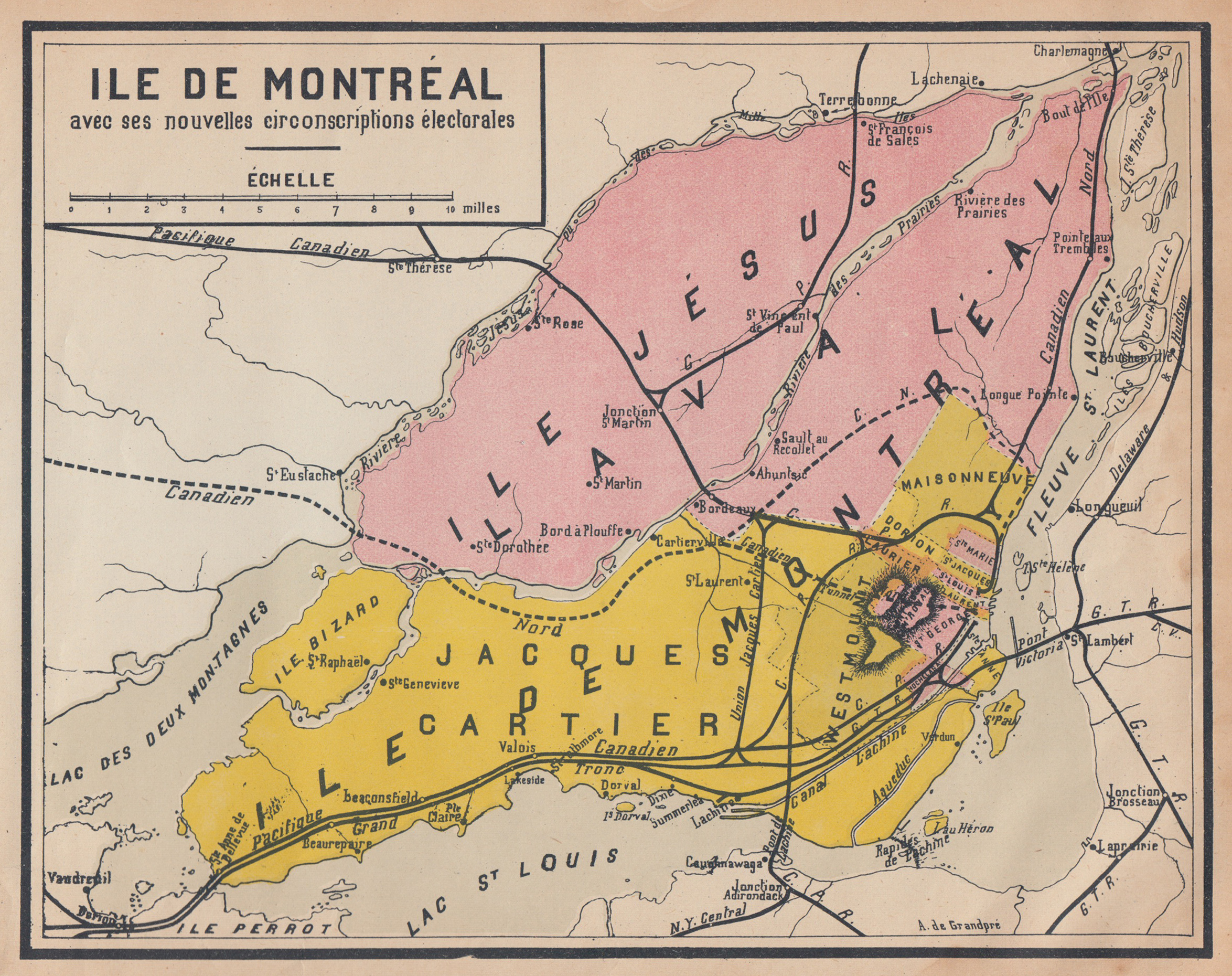
New ridings on the Island of Montreal

An Act passed prior to the election increased the number of MLAs from 74 to 81 through the following changes:

| Abolished ridings | New ridings |
Divisions of ridings
| Ottawa (Note: Protected seat under British North America Act 1867, s. 80. Successor seats had same status.) | Labelle; Ottawa |
| Pontiac | Pontiac; Témiscaming |
Creation of riding from parts of others
| | Frontenac (Note: formed from parts of Beauce and Compton) |
Reorganization of ridings
| Hochelaga; Montréal division no. 1; Montréal division no. 2; Montréal division no. 3; Montréal division no. 4; Montréal division no. 5; Montréal division no. 6 | Maisonneuve; Montréal-Dorion; Montréal-Hochelaga; Montréal-Laurier; Montréal–Sainte-Anne; Montréal–Sainte-Marie; Montréal–Saint-Georges; Montréal–Saint-Jacques; Montréal–Saint-Laurent; Montréal–Saint-Louis; Westmount |
| Charlevoix; Chicoutimi-Saguenay | Charlevoix—Saguenay; Chicoutimi |

== Results ==
| Party | Party leader | # of candidates | Seats | | | Popular Vote | | |
| Party | Party leader | # of candidates | 1908 | Elected | % Change | # | % | % Change |
|---|---|---|---|---|---|---|---|---|
| Liberal | Lomer Gouin | 80 | 57 | 62 | +10.5% | 155,958 | 53.54% | +0.01% |
| Conservative | Joseph-Mathias Tellier | 75 | 14 | 16 | +14.3% | 125,277 | 43.01% | +3.09% |
| Ligue nationaliste | Armand Lavergne | 2 | 3 | 1 | -66.7% | 2,703 | 0,93% | |
| Labour | Joseph-Alphonse Langlois | 3 | 0 | 1 | +100.0% | 3,751 | 1.29% | +1.29% |
| Independent Liberal | | 5 | - | 0 | | 2,864 | 1.00% | -0.63% |
| Other | | 3 | - | 1 | +100.0 | 739 | 0.30% | -2.11% |
| Total | | 169 | 74 | 81 | +9.5% | 291,292 | 100% | |

Popular vote
| PLQ | 53.54% |
| PCQ | 43.01% |
| Labour | 1.29% |
| LN | 0.93% |
| Others | 1.23% |

Popular vote
| PLQ | 76.54% |
| PCQ | 19.75% |
| Labour | 1.23% |
| LN | 1.23% |
| Others | 1.23% |

== See also ==
- List of Quebec premiers
- Politics of Quebec
- Timeline of Quebec history
- List of Quebec political parties
- 13th Legislative Assembly of Quebec
