= Joliette-Montcalm =

Quebec electoral district

Defunct provincial electoral district
- Legislature: National Assembly of Quebec
- District created: 1972
- District abolished: 1980
- First contested: 1973
- Last contested: 1976

Joliette-Montcalm was a former provincial electoral district in the Lanaudière region of Quebec, Canada that elected members to the National Assembly of Quebec.

It was created for the 1973 election, from parts of the existing Joliette and Montcalm electoral districts. Its final election was in 1976. It disappeared in the 1981 election and its successor electoral district was the re-created Joliette.

== Members of the National Assembly ==
Legislature	Years	Member	Party
Riding created from Joliette and Montcalm
30th	1973–1970	Robert Quenneville	Liberal
31st	1976–1981	Guy Chevrette	Parti Québécois
Riding dissolved into Joliette

=== Electoral results ===
1980 Quebec referendum
Side	Votes	%
Non	22,911	56.91
Oui	17,346	43.09

1976 Quebec general election
Party	Candidate	Votes	%	±%
Parti Québécois	Guy Chevrette	15,807	42.41	+5.36
Liberal	Robert Quenneville	10,496	28.16	-27.45
Union Nationale	André Asselin	9,612	25.79	+23.73
Ralliement créditiste	Jean-Pierre Gagné	1,172	3.14	-2.14
Workers	Jacques Trudeau	97	0.26	-
No designation	Isabelle Geoffroy	89	0.24	-

1973 Quebec general election
Party	Candidate	Votes	%	±%
Liberal	Robert Quenneville	18,010	55.61	+15.29
Parti Québécois	Bernard Landry	12,000	37.05	+9.84
Parti créditiste	André Bourbonnière	1,712	5.28	+1.20
Union Nationale	Lucien Marcoux	666	2.06	-26.33
