= Lucien Dugas =

Canadian politician, educator, and lawyer

Lucien Dugas (December 31, 1897 – October 29, 1985) was an educator, lawyer and political figure in Quebec. He represented Joliette in the Legislative Assembly of Quebec from 1927 to 1936 as a Liberal. Dugas was Speaker of the Legislative Assembly in 1936.

He was born in Joliette, Quebec, the son of François Octave Dugas and Alix Godin who was the daughter of François Benjamin Godin, and was educated at the Séminaire de Joliette and the Université de Montréal. He was admitted to the Quebec bar in 1921 and practised law in Joliette. He taught at the Séminaire de Joliette. Dugas was named King's Counsel in 1931.

He ran unsuccessfully for a seat in the Quebec assembly in the 1923 Quebec general election in Joliette. He was elected in 1927, and was re-elected in 1931 and 1935. However, he was defeated when he ran for reelection in 1936, and then again in 1939.

He was bâtonnier for the Laurentian district of the Quebec bar in 1953 and 1954. Dugas was also a director of the Joliette telephone company.

In 1926, Dugas married Simone Guimond. He died in Montreal at the age of 87 and was buried in Joliette.
